= Russell Morris discography =

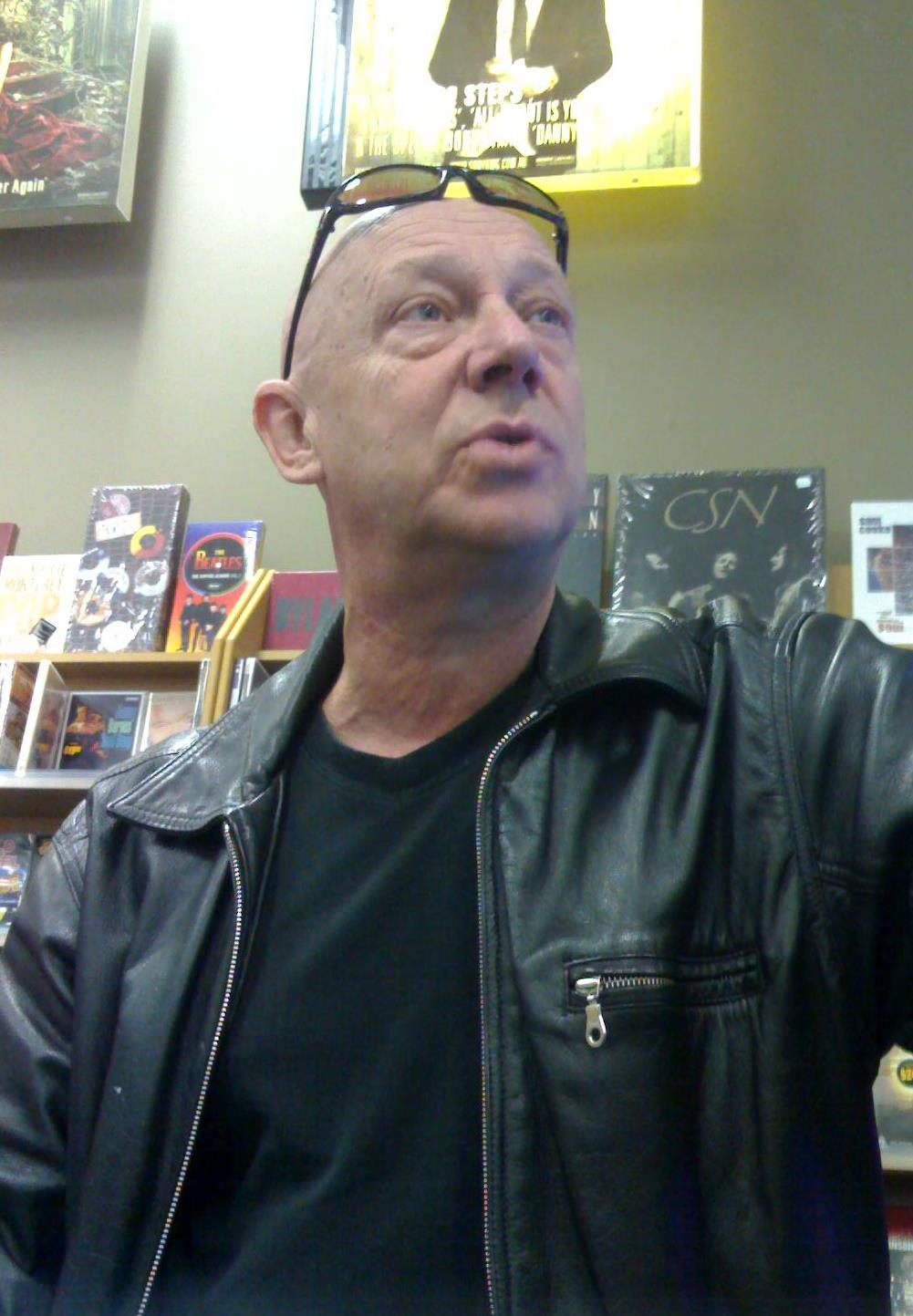
- Russell Morris in September 2006
- Studio albums: 15
- EPs: 1
- Live albums: 2
- Compilation albums: 5

This is the discography of Russell Morris, an Australian singer-songwriter who had five Australian top-10 singles during the late 1960s and early 1970s. On 1 July 2008, the Australian Recording Industry Association (ARIA) recognised Morris' status when he was inducted into the ARIA Hall of Fame.

Morris' highest charting album is Van Diemen's Land, which was released in 2014 and peaked at number 4 on the Australian ARIA Chart.

See also Somebody's Image, Burns Cotton & Morris, Cotton Keays & Morris and the Morris Springfield Project.

== Albums ==
=== Studio albums ===
List of studio albums, with selected chart positions
Title	Album details	Peak chart positions	Certifications (sales thresholds)
Title	Album details	AUS	Certifications (sales thresholds)
Bloodstone	Released: September 1971; Label: EMI; Format: Vinyl, cassette	12	
Russell Morris	Released: November 1975; Label: Wizard, RCA; Format: Vinyl, cassette	14	
Turn It On in America, the album was called 2	Released: August 1976; Label: Wizard, RCA; Format: Vinyl, cassette	—	
Foot in the Door (credited to The Russell Morris Band)	Released: 1979; Label: Mushroom; Format: Vinyl, cassette	38	
Almost Frantic (credited to Russell Morris & The Rubes)	Released: February 1981; Label: Mushroom; Format: Vinyl, cassette	28	
A Thousand Suns	Released: November 1991; Label: Mushroom; Format: Vinyl, cassette, CD	98	
Off the Shelf	Released: 2002; Label: Independent; Format: CD, digital download	—	
Fundamentalist	Released: May 2007; Label: Liberation; Format: CD, digital download	178	
Jumpstart Diary	Released: November 2008; Label: Russell Morris; Format: CD	—	
Wild Bulls and Horses (credited to Brian Cadd And Russell Morris)	Released: June 2011; Label: Caddman Enterprise; Format: CD, digital download	—	
Sharkmouth	Released: 12 October 2012; Label: FanFare/Ambition Entertainment; Format: CD, digital download	6	ARIA: Platinum
Van Diemens Land	Released: 11 April 2014; Label: FanFare/Ambition Entertainment; Format: CD, digital download	4	ARIA: Gold
Red Dirt – Red Heart	Released: 23 October 2015; Label: Roseabout, Chugg; Format: CD, digital download	21	
Black and Blue Heart	Released: 5 April 2019; Label: Bloodlines; Format: CD, digital download, LP, streaming	12	
The Dreams of Jack Chrome	Released: 5 August 2022; Label: Ambition Records; Format: CD, digital download, streaming	156	

=== Live albums ===
List of live albums, with selected details and chart positions
Title	Album details	Peak chart positions
Title	Album details	AUS
Live at the Con (credited to Brian Cadd And Russell Morris)	Released: November 2007; Label: Caddman Enterprise; Format: CD, digital download	—
Live at the Palladium 1982 (credited to Russell Morris and the Rubes)	Released: 1 March 2021; Label: Russell Morris, Australian RoadCrew; Format: Digital download, streaming	—
The Real Thing: Symphonic Concert	Released: 6 October 2023; Label: Ambition; Format: 2×CD, 2×LP, digital download, streaming	5

=== Compilation albums ===
List of compilation albums, with selected chart positions
Title	Album details	Peak chart positions
Title	Album details	AUS
Wings of an Eagle and Other Great Hits	Released: 1973; Label: His Master's Voice, EMI; Format: Vinyl, cassette	12
Retrospective	Released: 1978; Label: EMI; Format: Vinyl, cassette	162
The Real Thing	Released: August 2002; Label: Roustabout; Format: CD, digital download	—
The Greatest Hits	Released: 28 June 2008; Label: EMI; Format: CD, digital download	—
The Very Best of Russell Morris	Released: 4 October 2013; Label: EMI; Format: CD, digital download	198
Ghost Legends	Released: 13 May 2023; Label: Fanfare (FANFARE298); Format: 3CD+DVD, CD	185

== Extended plays ==
List of extended plays
Title	EP details
Mr America	Released: March 1972; Label: Columbia; Format: Vinyl, cassette

== Singles ==
List of singles, with selected chart positions
Title	Year	Peak chart positions		Album
Title	Year	AUS	NZ Listener	Album
"The Real Thing" b/w "It's Only a Matter of Time"	1969	1	—	non album singles
"Part Three into Paper Walls" / "The Girl That I Love"	1969	1	—	non album singles
"Rachel" b/w "Slow Joey"	1970	23	1	non album singles
"Mr. America" / "Stand Together"	1970	8	8	non album singles
"Sweet, Sweet Love" b/w "Jail Jonah's Daughter"	1971	7	5	Bloodstone
"Live with Friends" b/w "Alcohol Farm"	1972	13	—	Wings of an Eagle and Other Great Hits
"Wings of an Eagle" b/w "Satisfy You"	1972	9	14	Wings of an Eagle and Other Great Hits
"Let's Do It" b/w "Don't Rock the Boat"	1975	30	—	Russell Morris
"Sail with Me" b/w "Hard Road"	1976	—	—	Russell Morris
"R.J.S.S." b/w "Cloudy Day"	1976	95	—	Turn It On
"Wolves in White" b/w "Two Wheeled Flyer"	1976	—	—	Turn It On
"Thunder Ground" b/w "Two Minute Warning"	1979	49	—	Non-album single
"Hot Love" b/w "Love Stealer" (As The Russell Morris Band)	1979	48	—	Foot in the Door
"Surprise Surprise" b/w "I'm Just a Writer" (As The Russell Morris Band)	1979	—	—	Foot in the Door
"Hush" b/w "In the Heat of the Night" (Russell Morris & The Rubes)	1980	35	—	Almost Frantic
"The Roar of the Wild Torpedoes" b/w "Just Another Night" (Russell Morris & The Rubes)	1981	—	—	Almost Frantic
"So Tough" b/w "Walk Don't Run" (Russell Morris & The Rubes)	1981	—	—	Almost Frantic
"Get It Right" b/w "You Wanted Fame" (Russell Morris & The Rubes)	1982	—	—	Non-album singles
"I'll Stay with You" b/w "Turn to Stone"	1983	—	—	Non-album singles
"The Real Thing (1990 mix)"	1990	124	—	A Thousand Suns
"Tartan Lines" b/w "Over Excited"	1991	100	—	A Thousand Suns
"A Thousand Suns" b/w "This Bird Has Flown"	1991	118	—	A Thousand Suns
"Stay with You" b/w "She Is Leaving"	1991	—	—	A Thousand Suns
"Lonesome Road"	2015	—	—	Red Dirt – Red Heart
"Come My Children" (live - with Mike Brady)	2017	—	—	Non-album single
"Black and Blue Heart"	2019	—	—	Black and Blue Heart
"Call a Friend" (Kevin Borich featuring Russell Morris)	2020	—	—	Duets
"Hey Brother"	2024	—	—	Guitars 4 Vets Second Tour
"End of the Beginning"	2025	—	—	Non-album single
"—" denotes items which were not released in that country or failed to chart.
