= The Greatest Hits (Russell Morris album) =

Greatest hits album by Russell Morris
- Released: 28 June 2008
- Recorded: 1968–1972
- Genre: Pop rock
- Label: EMI Music
- Producer: Ian Meldrum, Howard Gable, Peter Dawkins

Russell Morris chronology
Jumpstart Diary (2008)	The Greatest Hits (2008)	Wild Bulls and Horses (2011)

The Greatest Hits is the fourth greatest hits compilation by Australian singer songwriter Russell Morris. The album was released in June 2008.

It was released to coincide with the announcement of Morris' induction into the ARIA Hall of Fame in 2008. The track listing is exactly the same as his 1978 compilation, Retrospective.

== Track listing ==
CD/ DD (2286952)

1. "Hide & Seek" credited to Somebody's Image (Doug Trevor, Martin Van Wyk) - 1:58
2. "The Real Thing" (Johnny Young) - 6:12
3. "Part Three into Paper Walls" (Russell Morris, Johnny Young) - 7:00
4. "It's Only a Matter of Time" (Hans Poulsen) - 2:58
5. "The Girl That I Love" (Johnny Young) - 4:36
6. "You On My Mind" - (Hans Poulsen) - 2:28
7. "Boom Town" (Russell Morris) - 3:18
8. "Rachel" (Raymond Froggatt) - 4:27
9. "Mr America" (Russell Morris) - 3:43
10. "Sweet, Sweet Love" (Russell Morris) - 4:19
11. "Live With Friends" (Russell Morris, Brian Cadd) - 3:39
12. "O Helly" - (Russell Morris) - 2:41
13. Jail Jonah's Daughter" - (Russell Morris) - 3:03
14. "Alcohol Farm" (Russell Morris) - 3:20
15. "Wings of an Eagle" (Russell Morris) - 3:57
