= Retrospective (Russell Morris album) =

Greatest hits album by Russell Morris
- Released: 1978
- Recorded: 1968–1972
- Genre: Pop rock
- Label: EMI Music
- Producer: Ian Meldrum, Howard Gable, Peter Dawkins

Russell Morris chronology
| Turn It On (1976) | Retrospective (1978) | Foot in the Door (1979) |

Alternative cover
- Compact Disc cover

Retrospective (also known as Retrospective 1968-1972) is the second greatest hits compilation by Australian singer-songwriter Russell Morris. The album was released in 1978. The album contains tracks from his Columbia Records, His Master's Voice and EMI Music years. The track listing is similar to his 1973 compilation, Wings of an Eagle and Other Great Hits.

The album was later released on Compact Disc and music download.

== Track listing ==
Side one
| No. | Title | Writer(s) | Length |
|---|---|---|---|
| 1. | "Hide & Seek" (credited to Somebody's Image) | Doug Trevor, Martin Van Wyk | 1:58 |
| 2. | "The Real Thing" | Johnny Young | 6:12 |
| 3. | "Part Three into Paper Walls" | Russell Morris, Young | 7:00 |
| 4. | "It's Only A Matter Of Time" | Hans Poulsen | 2:58 |
| 5. | "The Girl That I Love" | Young | 4:36 |
| 6. | "You On My Mind" | Poulsen | 2:28 |
| 7. | "Boom Town" | Morris | 3:18 |

Side two
| No. | Title | Writer(s) | Length |
|---|---|---|---|
| 1. | "Rachel" | Raymond Froggatt | 4:27 |
| 2. | "Mr America" | Russell Morris | 3:43 |
| 3. | "Sweet, Sweet Love" | Morris | 4:19 |
| 4. | "Live With Friends" | Morris, Brian Cadd | 3:39 |
| 5. | "O Helly" | Morris | 2:41 |
| 6. | "Jail Jonah's Daughter" | Morris | 3:03 |
| 7. | "Alcohol Farm" | Morris | 3:20 |
| 8. | "Wings of an Eagle" | Johnny Young | 3:57 |

== Charts ==
Chart performance for Retrospective
| Chart (1991) | Peak position |
|---|---|
| Australian Albums (ARIA) | 162 |
