= Wings of an Eagle and Other Great Hits =

Greatest hits album by Russell Morris
- Released: March 1973
- Recorded: 1969–1972
- Genre: Pop rock, rock, pop
- Label: His Master's Voice, EMI Music
- Producer: Ian Meldrum (tracks: A1 to A4), Howard Gable (tracks: A5 to B4), Peter Dawkins (tracks: B5, B6)

Russell Morris chronology
| Mr America (EP) (1972) | Wings of an Eagle and Other Great Hits (1973) | Russell Morris (1975) |

"Wings of an Eagle and Other Great Hits" is the first greatest hits compilation by Australian singer songwriter Russell Morris. The album peaked at number 12 on the Go-Set chart in March 1973.

In October 2010, Wings of an Eagle was listed in the book 100 Best Australian Albums at number 59.

== Track listing ==
Side one
| No. | Title | Writer(s) | Length |
|---|---|---|---|
| 1. | "The Real Thing" | Johnny Young | 6:12 |
| 2. | "It's Only A Matter Of Time" | Hans Poulsen | 2:58 |
| 3. | "The Girl That I Love" | Johnny Young | 4:36 |
| 4. | "Part Three into Paper Walls" | Russell Morris, Johnny Young | 7:00 |
| 5. | "Rachel" | Raymond Froggatt | 4:27 |

Side two
| No. | Title | Writer(s) | Length |
|---|---|---|---|
| 1. | "Mr America" | Russell Morris | 3:43 |
| 2. | "Sweet, Sweet Love" | Russell Morris | 4:19 |
| 3. | "Alcohol Farm" | Russell Morris | 3:20 |
| 4. | "Live With Friends" | Russell Morris, Brian Cadd | 3:39 |
| 5. | "Wings of an Eagle" | Russell Morris | 3:57 |
| 6. | "Satisfy You" | Russell Morris | 2:16 |
