= Burns Cotton & Morris =

Australian rock band

- Genres: Pop, rock
- Years active: 1996–2000
- Past members: Ronnie Burns; Darryl Cotton; Russell Morris

Burns Cotton & Morris was an Australian rock band formed in 1996 consisting of singer-songwriters Ronnie Burns, Darryl Cotton and Russell Morris. Each wrote and recorded numerous hit singles in the 1960s and 70s in Australia. The band toured Australia and released a self-titled album in 1996, which was a compilation of their individual hits as well as three new tracks. Two additional albums were released by the trio, Hear and Now in 1997 and Three in 1998.

== 1996–2000: History ==
Burns Cotton & Morris was formed in 1996. In 2000, Burns decided to leave the group and was replaced with Jim Keays and the group was disbanded and renamed Cotton Keays & Morris.

== Members ==
=== Ronnie Burns ===
Ronnie Burns (8 September 1946) was the lead singer of band The Flies in the early 1960s. This was followed by a solo career. On 10 June 2013 Burns was awarded a Member of the Order of Australia with the citation "For significant service to the community, particularly to children recovering from illness and trauma, and to the entertainment industry".

=== Darryl Cotton ===
Darryl Cotton (4 September 1949 – 27 July 2012) was a founding member of rock band Zoot along with Beeb Birtles (Mississippi and Little River Band). Following the break-up of Zoot, Cotton worked overseas for several years before returning to Australia to pursue a solo career. He also enjoyed success as the lead in the Australian production of Joseph and the Amazing Technicolor Dreamcoat, appeared in television programs including The Young Doctors and hosted The Early Bird Show.

Cotton's contributions to the setlist include Zoot hits "1x2x3x4" and a hard rock version of "Eleanor Rigby", the Mississippi single "Will I?" (co-written with Birtles), and his solo songs "Don't Let It Get to You" and the award-winning "Same Old Girl".

Cotton died from liver cancer on 27 July 2012.

=== Russell Morris ===
Russell Morris (born 31 July 1948) first enjoyed success in 1966 when his band Somebody's Image achieved a hit with a cover of the song "Hush". Breaking out as a solo musician, Morris achieved instant stardom with his classic song "The Real Thing". Between 1969 and 1972 Morris released seven charting singles, with five reaching the Top 10. "The Real Thing" was featured on a 1998 Australian postage stamp. Morris was inducted into the ARIA Hall of Fame in 2008.

Morris rounds out the band's repertoire with his hits: "Hush", "Rachel", "Mr America", "Wings of an Eagle", "It's All Over Now, Baby Blue", "Sweet, Sweet Love" and "The Real Thing".

== Discography ==
=== Albums ===
List of albums, with details
Title	Album details
Burns, Cotton & Morris	Released: 1996; Format: CD; Label: Burns Cotton & Morris (BCM1)
Here and Now	Released: 1997; Format: CD; Label: Burns Cotton & Morris (BCM2)
Three	Released: 1998; Format: CD; Label: Burns Cotton & Morris (BCM3)
