= John Sayers =

Australian audio engineer and record producer (1945–2021)

- Born: John Linacre Sayers; 27 June 1945; New Zealand
- Died: 14 September 2021 (aged 76); Bonalbo, New South Wales, Australia
- Occupations: Record producer; Audio engineer; Studio designer
- Years active: 1968–2000s
- Website: johnlsayers.com

John Linacre Sayers (27 June 1945 – September 2021) was an Australian audio engineer, record producer, and studio designer. Initially associated with Armstrong's Studios in Melbourne, he was later the owner of John Sayers Productions. He also designed recording studios, both in Australia and abroad.

== Early life ==
John Linacre Sayers was born on 27 June 1945 in New Zealand. As a television productions assistant, he arrived in Sydney on 25 May 1966. The "L" was included in his official website name as johnsayers.com was taken, but he did not use that initial for accredited works.

== Career ==
=== Music production ===
Sayers moved to Australia in 1966, first living in Sydney. After being interviewed in Sydney by Bill Armstrong, he moved to Melbourne in 1968 to work at Armstrong's Studios. He met British-born sound engineer Roger Savage there.

Sayers became one of a number of producer-engineers associated with the Melbourne popular music scene of the 1960s and 1970s and in particular with Armstrong's Studios, where many of the most successful Australian pop/rock recordings of the period were recorded.

Among his many recording credits, he recorded and mixed "The Real Thing" by Russell Morris.

=== Studio design ===
Sayers designed many recording studios, including Enmore Audio in Sydney as well as Music Farm Studio and Mix Artist Studio near Byron Bay in New South Wales.

Other studios in Australia designed by him include the Music School Recording Studio for Australian National University in Canberra; the Beyond 2000 and Charles Sturt University facilities; Apocalypse Audio Post Studio; Hello Testing; Cloud Studios; Flying Fox Studios; Wasteland Studio for Eskimo Joe in Fremantle, WA; Heliport Studios at Buderim on the Sunshine Coast, Queensland; Shockone in Perth; and WEFO Studio in Melbourne.

Overseas, he was responsible for the designs of Bloom Road Recording Studio at Eagle River, Wisconsin, US; Nu Faith Studios in Cape Town, South Africa; Studio al Watan in Dubai; Rose Lane in Carpinteria, California; and ff studio (for classical music) and Heart Music, both in Taiwan; and BlueJay Recording Studios in Mount Dora, Florida.

== Other activities ==
Sayers created the studio acoustics forum Recording Studio Design.

== Personal life and death ==
Sayers was a resident of Bonalbo from 2008. He died on 14 September 2021, aged 76.

== Recording credits ==
Sayers' recording credits as either engineer or producer or both include:

=== 1960s ===
- Liv Maessen - "Snowbird", "Knock Knock Who's There?"
- Matt Flinders - "Picking up Pebbles", "Butterfly"
- John Farnham - "One"
- Max Merritt and the Meteors - Western Union Man album :
- John Williamson - "Old Man Emu"
- Russell Morris - "The Real Thing", "Part Three into Paper Walls", "The Girl That I Love", "Sweet, Sweet Love", Bloodstone (album)
- The Masters Apprentices - "Turn up Your Radio", "5:10 Man"
- Ross D. Wyllie - "The Star", "Funny Man"
- Lionel Rose - "I Thank You".
- The Groop - "Such a Lovely Way".
- Axiom - "Arkansas Grass", "A Little Ray of Sunshine".
- Robin Jolley - "Marshall's Portable Music Machine".
- Ronnie Burns - "Smiley"
- Spectrum - "I'll Be Gone", Milesago album
- Indelible Murtceps - Warts up your Nose (album)
- Ted Mulry - "Julia"
- Zoot - Just Zoot (album), "Strange Things", "1 x 2 x 3 x 4"
- Fraternity - "Seasons of Change"
- The Valentines - "Nick Nack Paddy Wack"

=== 1970s ===
- Brian Cadd - Gingerman (album)
- Ted Mulry - Marcia
- Chain - Towards the Blues (album)
- Chain - "Grab A Snatch & Hold It"
- Chain - Judgement
- John Farnham Sings the Shows, Together (with Alison Durbin)
- Matt Taylor - Straight as a Die (album) - I Remember when I was Young
- Wendy Saddington - Looking Through a Window
- Rick Springfield - Speak to the Sky
- Kerry Biddell - You've got a Friend (album)
- Max Merritt And The Meteors - Stray Cats (Album)
- Billy Thorpe/Warren Morgan - Thumping Pig And Puffing Billy (album)
- Lobby Loyde and the Coloured Balls - Ball Power (album)
- MacKenzie Theory - Out of the Blue (album)
- Jimmy Little - Baby Blue
- Ted Mulry Gang - Jump in my Car (album), My Little Girl, Dark Town Strutters Ball
- Jackie Orszaczky - Morning in Beramiada (album)
- Sherbet - Life (album) - Child's Play
- Hush - Boney Moroney, Glad all Over
- Jon English and Renee Geyer - Every Beat Of My Heart
- Marcia Hines - Marcia Shines (album) - Fire and Rain/You, From The Inside (album).
- Chariot - (album)
- Southern Cross - Southern Cross (album)
- Pantha - Dway Do Dway Do (album)
- Greg Quill - The Outlaws Reply (album)
- Benjamin Hugg - What's Been Happening (album)
- Jeff St John - So Far So Good (album)
- Australia - Maiden Australia (album)
- Ray Burton - Dreamers and Nightflyers (album)
- The Coolangatta Gold - film soundtrack.
- Radio Birdman - Burn My Eye (EP)
- Radio Birdman - Radios Appear (album)
- Mi-Sex - Space Race (album)
- Mark Gillespie - Only Human (album)

=== 1980s ===
- Australian Crawl - Phalanx - Live album
- Goanna - Oceania (album) - Common Ground
- DD Smash - The Optimist
- The Motivators - The Motivators (album)
- Jim Keays - "Lucifer Street" - Red on the Meter (album)
- Mark Gillespie - Sweet Nothing (album)
- Mondo Rock - "Come Said the Boy" - The Modern Bop (album)
- Mi-Sex - Shanghaied! (album) - Falling In And Out, Shanghaied

=== 1990s ===
- Troy Cassar Daley - Beyond The Dancing (ARIA winner)
- Cam Fletcher - Kickin Up Dirt
- Jimmy Little - Yorta Yorta Man
- Jade Hurley - Life - Wouldn't Be Dead For Quids
- Tracey Fogarty - Playing to Win
- Kerry McInerney - Fools Game
- Spot The Dog - Drunk On The Moon
- Olivia Newton-John - Ghia
- The Spencer Band - This is Now
- Rough Red - Living in Australia

=== 2000s ===
- Kerry Leigh & Expresso Lane
- Dave Cavanagh & Cavo
