= Cotton Keays & Morris =

Australian rock band

- Also known as: CKM
- Genres: Pop, rock
- Years active: 2000–2012
- Past members: Darryl Cotton; Jim Keays; Russell Morris
- Website: mastersapprentices.com/ckmnews.htm

Cotton Keays & Morris (shortened to CKM by fans) was an Australian rock band formed in 2000 consisting of singer-songwriters Darryl Cotton, Jim Keays and Russell Morris. Each wrote and recorded numerous hit songs since the 1960s. The band toured Australia regularly, their stage show featuring the hits of each member and their previous groups.

== 2000-2012: History ==
Cotton Keays & Morris was formed in 2000. During the previous decade, Cotton and Morris had toured with another 1960s pop star Ronnie Burns as Burns Cotton, & Morris. When Burns decided to leave the group, The Masters Apprentices frontman Jim Keays was invited to join Cotton and Morris in a similar band, bringing with him a sizeable catalogue of hits to add to the on-stage repertoire. The group toured throughout 2000s until Cotton and Keays died in 2012 and 2014. They released 2 studio albums of their individual greatest hits as well as an acoustic album in 2003 and a live album in 2004, which was recorded in The Basement, Sydney in 2004.

== Members ==
=== Darryl Cotton ===
Daryl Cotton (4 September 1949 – 27 July 2012) was a founding member of rock band Zoot along with Beeb Birtles (Mississippi and Little River Band). Following the break-up of Zoot, Cotton worked overseas for several years before returning to Australia to pursue a solo career. He also enjoyed success as the lead in the Australian production of Joseph and the Amazing Technicolor Dreamcoat, appeared in television programs including The Young Doctors and hosted The Early Bird Show.

Cotton's contributions to the setlist include Zoot hits "1x2x3x4" and a hard rock version of "Eleanor Rigby", Mississippi single "Will I?" (co-written with Birtles), and his solo songs "Don't Let It Get to You" and the award-winning "Same Old Girl".

Cotton died from liver cancer on 27 July 2012.

=== Jim Keays ===
Jim Keays (9 September 1946 – 13 June 2014) was the lead singer for Australian rock band The Masters Apprentices from 1965 to 1971. The band has re-formed occasionally for nostalgia and benefit concerts. Keays went on to forge a successful solo career. Keays, together with The Masters Apprentices, was inducted into the ARIA Hall of Fame in 1998. In 2007 Keays was diagnosed with myeloma, which caused his kidneys to fail, but the cancer went into remission.

Keays contributions include The Masters Apprentices hits "Living in a Child's Dream", "Elevator Driver", "5:10 Man", "Think About Tomorrow Today", "Because I Love You" and "Turn Up Your Radio" (the song featured on a 1998 Australian postage stamp). His solo hit "The Boy from the Stars" is also featured.

Keays died from pneumonia related to multiple myeloma on 13 June 2014.

=== Russell Morris ===
Russell Morris (born 31 July 1948) first enjoyed success in 1966 when his band Somebody's Image achieved a hit with a cover of the song "Hush". Breaking out as a solo musician, Morris achieved instant stardom with his classic song "The Real Thing". Between 1969 and 1972 Morris released seven charting singles, with five reaching the Top 10. "The Real Thing" was featured on a 1998 Australian postage stamp. Morris was inducted into the ARIA Hall of Fame in 2008.

Morris rounds out the band's repertoire with his hits: "Hush", "Rachel", "Mr America", "Wings of an Eagle", "It's All Over Now, Baby Blue", "Sweet, Sweet Love" and "The Real Thing".

== Concert reviews ==
- February 2001, Capers

"In an evening littered with rich memories and moments, it's difficult to pick out the finest contributions." (See complete review)

- September 2003, Canterbury-Hurlstone Park RSL

"This was one of the most enjoyable concerts I have been to in a long while." (See complete review)

- September 2004, The Entrance Leagues Club

"This night, on stage, surpasses them all." (See complete review)

- March 2005, Melbourne Town Hall

"I can remember being 18 and thinking, if I make it to 25, I'll be happy and all these years later, here we are." (See complete review)

== Discography ==
=== Albums ===
List of albums, with details
Title	Album details
Maximum Hits	Released: 2002; Format: CD; Label: Cotton Keays & Morris (CKM 001)
Maximum Hits (Volume 2)	Released: 2002; Format: CD; Label: Cotton Keays & Morris (CKM 002)
Live & Acoustic	Released: 2003; Format: CD; Label: Cotton Keays & Morris (CKM 003)
Live at The Basement	Released: August 2004; Format: CD; Label: Cotton Keays & Morris (CKM 004)
One With The Lot	Released: 2008; Format: CD; Label: Amcos; Note: Compilation
