= Mr America (EP) =

EP by Russell Morris
- Released: 2 March 1972
- Recorded: Melbourne, 1969-1970
- Genre: Pop
- Label: EMI/Columbia (Australia)

Russell Morris chronology
Bloodstone (1971)	Mr America (1972)	Wings of an Eagle and Other Great Hits (1973)

Mr. America is a 4-track EP by Australian singer Russell Morris, released on 2 March 1972. It includes two singles and two B-sides that were not included on his debut studio album, Bloodstone in 1971.

== Track listing ==
Side one
No.	Title	Writer(s)	Length
1.	"The Girl That I Love" (B-side to "Part Three into Paper Walls")	Johnny Young	4:36
2.	"Slow Joey" (B-side to "Rachel")	Russell Morris	2:26

Side two
No.	Title	Writer(s)	Length
1.	"Rachel"	Raymond Froggatt	4:27
2.	"Mr. America"	Russell Morris	3:43
