= Fundamentalist (album) =

Album by Russell Morris

Studio album by Russell Morris
- Released: 19 May 2007
- Recorded: Peter Robinson's
- Genres: Acoustic, Blues music
- Length: 61:03
- Label: Liberation Blue

Russell Morris chronology
The Real Thing (2002)	Fundamentalist (2007)	Live at the Con (2007)

Fundamentalist is a studio album by Russell Morris released in May 2007. It captures a collection of material performed solo/acoustic by Russell Morris, including his two no.1 singles, "The Real Thing" and "Part Three into Paper Walls". As of 2013, the album has sold around 8,000 copies in Australia.

== Review ==
Bruce Elder of Sydney Morning Herald said this album has "impressive acoustic version[s]" of "Wings of an Eagle", "Sweet, Sweet Love", "The Real Thing" and "Part Three into Paper Walls" and complimented the "remarkably intense and personal reading of Bob Dylan's 'It's All Over Now, Baby Blue' and a suitably chugging reading of Lennon-McCartney's 'I Am The Walrus'". Elder concluded the review with: "He has been constantly touring for the past 11 years and the experience of the road produces versions of the songs that, in some instances, are little short of amazing. 'The Real Thing', when backed by little more than an acoustic guitar, sounds as good as the original piece of pop psychedelia."

== Track listing ==
1. "1000 Suns" – 4:43
2. "Wings of an Eagle" – 4:02
3. "Sweet, Sweet Love" – 4:20
4. "Mr America" – 3:19
5. "It's All Over Now, Baby Blue" – 3:53
6. "Keeping My Distance" – 3:46
7. "As Long As It Takes" – 2:38
8. "The Girl That I Love" – 3:45
9. "Over You" – 3:32
10. "Hush" – 4:45
11. "As Far As I Can Remember" – 3:42
12. "I am the Walrus" – 3:44
13. "The Real Thing" – 4:34
14. "Part Three into Paper Walls" – 6:08
15. "Morning Song" 4:01 (silent track)

== Credits ==
- Drums – Kevin Murphy
- Guitar, Vocals, Bass, Keyboards – Peter Robinson
- Harmonica – Jim Keays

== Charts ==
Chart performance for Fundamentalist
Chart (2007)	Peak position
Australian Albums (ARIA)	178

== Release history ==
Region	Date	Format	Edition(s)	Label	Catalogue
Australia	19 May 2007	CD; digital download	Standard	Liberation Blue	BLUE1452
