= Live at the Con =

Live album by Brian Cadd and Russell Morris
- Released: 3 November 2007
- Recorded: Queensland Conservatorium Griffith University, Queensland, 9–10 March 2007
- Label: Caddmann Enterprises / MGM

Brian Cadd chronology
Quietly Rusting (2005)	Live at the Con (2007)	Wild Bulls and Horses (2011)

Russell Morris chronology
Fundamentalist (2007)	Live at the Con (2007)	Jumpstart Diary (2008)

Live at the Con is a collaborative live album by ARIA Award winning artists, Brian Cadd and Russell Morris. The album was released on 3 November 2007, following Cadd's induction in the ARIA Hall of Fame a month earlier.

The album was recorded on 9th and 10 March 2007, with the Queensland Conservatorium Orchestra, where Cadd and Morris performed tracks from their 40-year careers.

== Track listing ==
Standard edition
No.	Title	Writer(s)	Length
1.	"Don't You Know It's Magic"	Brian Cadd	5:29
2.	"Rachel"	Raymond Froggatt	4:02
3.	"Let Go"	Cadd	5:04
4.	"Nights in White Satin"	Justin Hayward	4:18
5.	"Out of Time"		5:36
6.	"What I Want the Most"		3:22
7.	"Wings of an Eagle"	Russell Morris	4:30
8.	"Arkansas Grass"	Cadd, Don Mudie	4:18
9.	"A Little Ray of Sunshine"	Cadd, Don Mudie	4:11
10.	"Sweet, Sweet Love"	Morris	4:52
11.	"Ginger Man"	Cadd	4:33
12.	"The Real Thing"	Johnny Young	8:34
13.	"Mama Don't Dance"	Kenny Loggins, Jim Messina	4:08

== Release history ==
Region	Date	Format	Edition(s)	Label	Catalogue
Australia	3 November 2007	CD	Standard	Caddmann Enterprises / MGM	CDMN0711
