= Russell Morris (album) =

Studio album by Russell Morris
- Released: November 1975
- Recorded: The Hit Factory, New York City
- Genre: Pop, rock, Soft rock
- Length: 38:22
- Label: Wizard Records (Australia); RCA Records (USA)
- Producer: Edward Germano

Russell Morris chronology
Wings of an Eagle and Other Great Hits (1973)	Russell Morris (1975)	Turn It On (1976)

Singles from Russell Morris
- 1. "Let's Do It / Don't Rock the Boat" Released: October 1975; 2. "Sail with Me / Hard Road" Released: May 1976

Russell Morris is the second studio album by Australian singer songwriter Russell Morris and first on label Wizard Records and was released in November 1975. It features re-recording of two of Morris' previous hits; "Wings of an Eagle" and "Sweet, Sweet Love" as well as 8 new tracks penned by Morris. The lead single "Let's Do It"/"Don't Rock the Boat" peaked at number 30, whilst the album peaked at number 14 on the Kent Music Report chart in November 1975.

== Track listing ==
Side one
No.	Title	Writer(s)	Length
1.	"Wings of an Eagle" (re-recording)	Russell Morris	3:43
2.	"Sweet, Sweet Love" (re-recording)	Russell Morris	4:04
3.	"Blue Eyed Girl"	Russell Morris	3:31
4.	"Hard Road"	Russell Morris	3:21
5.	"Miss Rock 'N' Roll"	Russell Morris	4:15

Side two
No.	Title	Writer(s)	Length
1.	"Sail With Me"	Russell Morris	3:35
2.	"Let's Do It"	Russell Morris	3:50
3.	"Don't Rock The Boat"	Russell Morris	3:03
4.	"When The Mockingbird Sings"	Russell Morris	3:53
5.	"I Remember When"	Russell Morris	3:07

== Credits ==
- Arranged By [Strings], Conductor [Strings] – Jimmy Wisner
- Art Direction – Acy R. Lehman
- Artwork – Olive Alpert, Carl Dellacroce
- Backing Vocals – Barbara Massey, Carl Hall, Tasha Thomas
- Bass – Will Lee
- Drums – Rick Marotta
- Engineer – Harry Maslin
- Engineer [Assistant] – Howie Lindeman, Kevin Herron, Ted Spencer
- Guitar – David Spinozza, Don Thomas, Hugh McCracken, Russell Morris, Vinnie Bell
- Horns – George Opalsky, Michael Brecker, Randy Brecker
- Keyboards – Jim Wisner, Ken Archer
- Percussion – Arthur Jenkins
- Strings – The Al Brown String Section

== Charts ==
Chart (1975/76)	Peak position
Australian (Kent Music Report)	14
