= The Morris Springfield Project =

Australian duo

- Origin: Melbourne, Victoria, Australia
- Years active: 2021
- Labels: Morris Springfield; Ambition Records
- Members: Russell Morris; Rick Springfield

The Morris Springfield Project are an Australian musical duo consisting of Russell Morris and Rick Springfield. They released Jack Chrome and the Darkness Waltz in October 2021, which debuted at number 34 on the ARIA Albums Chart.

== History ==
Russell Morris and Rick Springfield have known each other for over 50 years with Springfield playing instruments on Morris' 1971 debut album, Bloodstone. The duo performed together as part of Zoot and in 2014, Springfield played on Morris' album, Van Diemen's Land also.

In July 2021, Morris took to social media to announce that he and Springfield had been working together and announced the duo and the duo's album, Jack Chrome and the Darkness Waltz. The album focuses on Mexico's Day of the Dead (Día de los Muertos) festival. Morris said "We have always loved the Mexican 'Day of Dead' festival. It is a beautiful concept, whereby every year at the end of October, they invite their departed loved ones spirits, to come back and live amongst them for three weeks. It is three weeks of celebrations, and embracing the ones who have departed this world. We both love the album and we hope you will also."

The album was released on 15 October 2021 and debuted at number 34 on the ARIA Charts. In an album review, Jeff Jenkins from Stack Magazine said called it "a killer combination" saying "Morris inhabits the character of Jack Chrome, bringing a menacing presence, while Springfield adds some Spanish to the saga, with a ragged vocal that reminds of Steve Earle's finest work... The record is an unforgettable tale of death and darkness, life and loss, sin and celebration."

== Discography ==
=== Studio albums ===
List of studio albums, with selected details
Title	Details	Peak chart positions
Title	Details	AUS
Jack Chrome and the Darkness Waltz	Released: 15 October 2021; Label: Morris Springfield / Ambition Records (AMBITION130); Format: Digital download, streaming, CD, LP	34
