= Roger Savage =

Australian sound engineer

- Born: United Kingdom
- Occupation: Sound engineer
- Years active: 1971-present
- Known for: Moulin Rouge!

Roger Savage is an English born, Australian sound engineer of music and film. He engineered Australian popular music recordings in the 1960s, and worked on films from the 1980s onwards. He was nominated for an Oscar for his work on Moulin Rouge! in 2002.

== Career ==
Roger Savage worked at Olympic Studios in London, where he had recorded demos with Mick Jagger and Dusty Springfield.

Roger met Australian woman Carol Harrington while she was travelling in England, they married and he migrated to Australia with her in 1963. In January 1964, he recorded a song at Telefil Studios (on the site of what became Memo Music Hall), "I Belong With You", by Bobby Bright and Laurie Allen, which topped the Melbourne music charts for two weeks.

Savage worked with Bill Armstrong at Armstrong's Studios in Melbourne, eventually becoming a partner. There he met New Zealand-born sound engineer John Sayers, who arrived from Sydney in 1968. Bill Armstrong said that Savage helped to train many engineers and producers at his studios, including engineers Allan Pay, Ernie Rose, John Sayers and Graeme Owens, and producers Molly Meldrum, Howard Gable, Robie Porter and Ron Tudor.

Savage engineered some of the most important Australian popular music recordings of the 1960s, including classic tracks by The Twilights, MPD Ltd, The Masters Apprentices, and Spectrum, as well as innumerable radio and TV commercials. He also started working on films in the 1970s. One of his earliest film credits was as an audio engineer on Getting Back to Nothing, Tim Burstall's documentary of the 1970 World Surfing Championships staged at Bells Beach, Victoria.

After Armstrong's transitioned into Armstrong Audio Visual (AAV), which was bought by The Age newspaper group, Savage stayed at AAV for some time, but wanted to establish his own studio focused solely on music. With this in mind, he and a business partner bought a vacant block of land in Bank Street, but owing to poor economic circumstances in the 1980s a new studio did not materialize. Savage left AAV in the early 1980s to do freelance work in film production, and was hired to work on Return of the Jedi, released in 1983.

== Recognition and awards ==
Savage was co-winner of the AFI Award for Best Achievement in Sound in 1979 (Mad Max), 1982 (Mad Max 2), 1984 (Street Hero), 1986 (Malcolm), 1987 (Ground Zero), 1989 (Dead Calm), 1990 (Blood Oath), 1994 (Muriel's Wedding), 1996 (Shine), and 2001 (Moulin Rouge!).

In 1984, Savage was awarded the Byron Kennedy Award (an AACTA) "for his innovative and pioneering work in film and television sound".

Also in 1984, he won the Australian Film Institute Jury Prize.

Savage won a BAFTA Award for Best Sound in 1996 (for Shine) and 2001 (Moulin Rouge!). He was also nominated for the award in 1992 (JFK), 1997 (Romeo + Juliet), and 2004 (House of Flying Daggers).

In 2001 he was awarded the Centenary Medal, "For service to Australian society and Australian film production".

In 2002, he was nominated for an Academy Award in the category Best Sound for the film Moulin Rouge!.

In 2013, he was awarded the John Howie Award for Outstanding Leadership, Achievement and Service to the Victorian Screen Industry, by Film Victoria.

== Selected filmography ==
- Moulin Rouge! (2001)
- Shine (1996)
- Babe (1995)
- Return of the Jedi (1983)
- The Pirate Movie (1982)
- Mad Max (1979)
