= List of number-one singles in 1970 (New Zealand) =

This is a list of Number 1 hit singles in 1970 in New Zealand, starting with the first chart dated, 16 January 1970.

== Chart ==
Key
‡ – Single of New Zealand origin

Week	Artist	Title
2 January 1970	Summer break - no chart	Summer break - no chart
9 January 1970	Summer break - no chart	Summer break - no chart
16 January 1970	Blood, Sweat & Tears	"And When I Die"
23 January 1970	Blood, Sweat & Tears	"And When I Die"
30 January 1970	Blood, Sweat & Tears	"And When I Die"
6 February 1970	The Fourmyula	"Nature"^{‡}
13 February 1970	The Fourmyula	"Nature"^{‡}
20 February 1970	Badfinger	"Come & Get It"
27 February 1970	Badfinger	"Come & Get It"
6 March 1970	The Fourmyula	"Nature"^{‡}
13 March 1970	The Fourmyula	"Nature"^{‡}
20 March 1970	Shocking Blue	"Venus"
27 March 1970	Shocking Blue	"Venus"
3 April 1970	Edison Lighthouse	"Love Grows (Where My Rosemary Goes)"
10 April 1970	Edison Lighthouse	"Love Grows (Where My Rosemary Goes)"
17 April 1970	The Beatles	"Let It Be"
24 April 1970	The Beatles	"Let It Be"
1 May 1970	The Beatles	"Let It Be"
8 May 1970	John Rowles	"Cheryl Moana Marie"^{‡}
15 May 1970	Simon & Garfunkel	"Bridge over Troubled Water"
22 May 1970	The Peddlers	"Girlie"
29 May 1970	Simon & Garfunkel	"Bridge over Troubled Water"
5 June 1970	Mary Hopkin	"Knock Knock, Who's There?"
12 June 1970	Craig Scott	"Star Crossed Lovers"^{‡}
20 June 1970	Craig Scott	"Star Crossed Lovers"^{‡}
27 June 1970	Craig Scott	"Star Crossed Lovers"^{‡}
3 July 1970	The Pipkins	"Gimme Dat Ding"
10 July 1970	The Pipkins	"Gimme Dat Ding"
17 July 1970	Craig Scott	"Star Crossed Lovers"^{‡}
24 July 1970	Russell Morris	"Rachel"
31 July 1970	Mungo Jerry	"In The Summertime"
7 August 1970	Hogsnort Rupert	"Pretty Girl"^{‡}
14 August 1970	Hogsnort Rupert	"Pretty Girl"^{‡}
21 August 1970	Hogsnort Rupert	"Pretty Girl"^{‡}
28 August 1970	Maria Dallas	"Pinocchio"^{‡}
4 September 1970	Maria Dallas	"Pinocchio"^{‡}
11 September 1970	Maria Dallas	"Pinocchio"^{‡}
18 September 1970	Maria Dallas	"Pinocchio"^{‡}
25 September 1970	Maria Dallas	"Pinocchio"^{‡}
2 October 1970	Maria Dallas	"Pinocchio"^{‡}
9 October 1970	The Kinks	"Lola"
16 October 1970	The Kinks	"Lola"
23 October 1970	The Kinks	"Lola"
30 October 1970	The Kinks	"Lola"
6 November 1970	The Kinks	"Lola"
13 November 1970	The Kinks	"Lola"
20 November 1970	Neil Diamond	'Cracklin' Rosie"
27 November 1970	Neil Diamond	'Cracklin' Rosie"
4 December 1970	Neil Diamond	'Cracklin' Rosie"
11 December 1970	Neil Diamond	'Cracklin' Rosie"
18 December 1970	Neil Diamond	'Cracklin' Rosie"
25 December 1970	Michael Nesmith & the First National Band	"Joanne"
