= Fundamentalism (disambiguation) =

Fundamentalism refers to a variety of religious, political and ideological philosophies or movements.

Fundamentalism or Fundamentalist may also refer to:

== Religious positions ==
- Atheistic fundamentalism
- Christian fundamentalism
  - Mormon fundamentalism
- Hindu fundamentalism
- Islamic fundamentalism
- Jewish fundamentalism

== Other uses ==
- Fundamentalism (sculpture), a 2011 sculpture by Jens Galschiot
- Fundamentalist (album), a 2007 album by Russell Morris
- Market fundamentalism, an economic ideology
- Reasons fundamentalism, a philosophical theory
