= Armstrong Studios =

Australian recording studio

Coordinates: 37°50′1″S 144°57′42″E

Armstrong Studios, also known as Bill Armstrong's Studio, Metropolis Studios, and later renamed Armstrong Audio Video (AAV), is a former Australian commercial recording studio and video post-production facility located in South Melbourne, Victoria. From its founding in 1965 by producer Bill Armstrong until around 1975, the outfit was arguably the top independent recording studio in Australasia. Known for producing a great number of hit records, Armstrong's earned labels such as "the Hit Factory" and "Australia's Abbey Road". After a change of premises to the Melbourne Butter Supply building at 180 Bank Street in 1972, several changes of hands, and the eventual demise of Metropolis in 2005, sound engineer Doug Brady took over the studios, reverting to its original name as Armstrong's, until around 2010.

== History ==
Founder Bill Armstrong (June 1929 – 7 August 2026), then an electrical engineering student at Caulfield Tech (later part of Monash University), started by building his own machine for cutting records, and aged 19 recorded jazz artists such as Smacka Fitzgibbon from his parents' house in East Malvern. He became a music producer and was known as a "pioneer of pop". His friend, audio technician, Neil McCrae, helped to build an amplifier.

In 1965, Armstrong opened his own studio in a small terrace house in Albert Rd, South Melbourne. British-born sound engineer Roger Savage was employed, and later became a partner in the business. One of the first pop recordings made there was the backing track for The Easybeats' 1965 breakthrough hit "She's So Fine", soon after Savage had arrived from the UK as an assisted migrant. Reflecting on Savage's subsequent importance to the Australian music industry in a 2013 ABC Radio National interview, Armstrong quipped that Savage's assisted passage to Australia represented "probably the best £20 the Australian government ever spent". Among other artists who recorded at the studio, were John Farnham, with his first hit "Sadie" in 1967, and Ian "Molly" Meldrum, who produced the Russell Morris song "The Real Thing" in 1969. Other producers at the studio in the early days included Howard Gable, Robie Porter, and Ron Tudor. Engineers included Allan Pay, Ernie Rose, John Sayers, and Graeme Owens.

As the popularity of the studios grew, Armstrong rented additional houses on the street, until the business occupied five townhouses as well as a custom-built studio in the laneway at the back. They ran (illegal) multiple telephone lines over the fences of properties to connect the different premises. In 1968 Armstrong installed the first 8-track recorder in Australia, and the studios always kept up with the latest in technology, later upgrading to 16- and 24-track recorders.

Armstrong's also became the leading studio for recording national advertising commercials, and a team of music jingle writers occupied offices in the facility, including Bruce Smeaton, Bruce Woodley, and John Farrar. Interviewed in 2013, Armstrong recalled that John Farnham was often hired to record vocals for commercial jingles, and it was there that he was discovered by producer David Mackay, who subsequently signed the singer to a recording contract with EMI, and produced his breakthrough hit single "Sadie".

In 1972, having run out of space in Albert Road, the studios moved to a converted butter factory ("Melbourne Butter Supply Ltd") warehouse, which had been used most recently as a supermarket, at 180 Bank Street, South Melbourne. In this space, the multiple studios could be housed under one roof. Gary Tippet wrote in The Age in 2006 that it was here that 8 out of 10 Australian chart hits were recorded, including Daddy Cool's 1971 hit "Eagle Rock" and "Up There Cazaly" (1979), and it was there that the Neighbours theme song was born. Little River Band, INXS, The Seekers, Kylie Minogue, Nick Cave, Masters Apprentices, Max Merritt and the Meteors, Normie Rowe, and Split Enz recorded there, as well as visiting international artists such as Paul McCartney, U2, Madonna, Bob Dylan, Mick Jagger, Deep Purple and the Foo Fighters. Many of the most popular and successful Australian recordings from the mid-1960s to the mid-1980s were made there, including hit albums and singles by The Twilights, The Groove, The Groop, Zoot, The Aztecs, Brian Cadd, Franciscus Henri, Hans Poulsen, Spectrum, Skyhooks, The Sports, Models and many others. Many famous overseas artists also recorded there while visiting Australia, including Earl Hines, Cleo Laine and John Dankworth, and Stephane Grapelli. Engineer Doug Brady joined the staff.

In the early to mid 1970s, in anticipation of the introduction of colour television in Australia, The Age bought Armstrong's share of the business, and the company was renamed Armstrong Audio Video (AAV). Armstrong remained as a company director until 1974, and Roger Savage also remained at AAV until the early 1980s. The soundtracks for the films Stork (1971), Alvin Purple (1972), and Mad Max (1978) were produced by AAV.

After the studios were acquired by Ernie Rose, producer-engineer and former employee of Armstrong's before moving to Flagstaff Studios (formerly W&G Records), the company's name was changed to Metropolis (Studios), under Rose and Ian McKenzie. AAV later acquired Flagstaff Studios, which moved into the Bank Street location. Doug Brady also joined AAV from Flagstaff, going on to produce many award-winning albums including John Farnham's hugely successful "comeback" album Whispering Jack in 1986. The music department of AAV was sold off in the mid-1990s, and Brady opened his own studio, Furstock.

Post-production and mastering technician Martin Pullen later occupied the old Armstrong Studio 1 in Bank Street.

In 2005, a controlling share was acquired by Celtex, a software, property development, and music education company. This company got into financial difficulties within a year, and Metropolis was abruptly closed down by the building's owners in 2006. Ernie Rose owned shares in the company, but was a freelancer.

After Metropolis closed in late 2006, Doug Brady returned as a partner in the business, and returned it to its original name, as Armstrong's. During this period, Brady recorded or mixed for artists including David Campbell, David Hobson, Guy Sebastian, Shannon Noll, Deep Purple, Ross Wilson, Ian Gillan, and others. The studios underwent a significant upgrade, including the installation of a vintage Neve console in 2009.

== Building ==
The building at 180 Bank Street, which is on a site covering 2,580 m^{2} (27,800 sq ft), later became home to DDP Studios, owned by Deluxe Australia, which closed in September 2016. In April 2019 the building was put up for sale, and expected to sell for around $30 million.

In August 2023, by which time the building was heritage-listed, it was being converted to office space, while retaining the Art Deco-style signage "Melbourne Butter Supply" on the outside.

== Significance ==
Owing to its having produced so many hit records, Armstrong's earned monikers such as "the Hit Factory" and "Australia's Abbey Road". Music journalist Ed Nimmervoll, commenting on the studio's closure in 2006, wrote "Anywhere else in the world, they'd be looking after it for posterity... It's our Abbey Road or Sun Studios".

In 2015, The Sydney Morning Herald described Bill Armstrong, as "the most prolific music recorder you've never heard of".

In July 2025, Mixdown Magazine listed Armstrong's as one of "The 10 most important Australian recording studios of the 20th century".

A book authored by Brendan Watkins about Armstrong's, working title Australia's Abbey Road, is due to be published in late 2027.
