= GTK (TV series) =

- Genre: Music, Arts
- Opening theme: GTK theme (composed by Hans Poulsen)
- Country of origin: Australia
- Original language: English
- No. of episodes: 1,000+

Production
- Running time: 10 minutes (Monday to Thursday at 6.30 pm)

Original release
- Network: ABC
- Release: 4 August 1969 – 1975

Related
- Funky Road

GTK (standing for "Get to Know") is an Australian music television series of ten minute episodes, produced and broadcast by ABC Television from 1969 to 1975.

== History ==
The series title was an initialism of the phrase "Get To Know". Officially, it was said that GTK was created by the ABC to address the perception that the Australian youth audience was being poorly served by commercial radio and TV, and that international music and especially Australian popular music was being ignored by commercial television and radio at that time.

Ken Watts, ABC's Director of Television, had a problem at 6:30 pm time slot. Because ABC-TV was non-commercial, 30-minute American programs only ran 24'30" without ad breaks, which created a programming problem when the commercial networks started their news broadcasts. ABC TV had been running an American sitcom across the 6:30 pm to 6:40 pm timeslot, after which Bellbird, a soap opera about an Australian country town, began. Bellbird finished at 6:55 pm and across Australia, each state would then insert local Regional news into the schedule from 6.55 until 7:00 pm when the ABC's iconic national news started, followed by a current affairs show, This Day Tonight. Watts understood that if ABC TV started a program at 6:30 pm, leaving a 5 minute gap to fill for Metro audiences. Viewers would have an alternative to watching the commercial news broadcasts and it would of course lead them to watch Bellbird, then ABC News and This Day Tonight. Watts needed to come up with a program only ten minutes long that would run Monday to Thursday before Bellbird. Ric Birch, aged 24, at that time the ABC-TV network's youngest ever television director, devised a program that would attract teenage viewers, and in less than six weeks, made four pilot shows. He was given the go-ahead to start production and continue until the end of November, when the network went into summer break programming.

Writer Stephen MacLean, who also worked at the surf/music magazine Go-Set, worked on the show. GTK premiered on 4 August 1969 and achieved higher ratings than Bellbird within three weeks. Watts authorised the show to continue throughout the following year. Birch produced and directed GTK until the end of 1970, when he moved to the United States and then to the United Kingdom, from where he conducted interviews and sent the filmed material back to GTK in Australia.

GTK ran until 1975, after which it was superseded by Funky Road. GTK and its successor Funky Road co-existed with the weekly show Countdown for a brief period. Funky Road had the same producer, Bernie Cannon, in addition to Stephen MacLean and Albie Thoms. Its duration was 30 minutes instead of the previous 10 minutes and moved to a 10:30 pm slot.

== Description ==
GTK's magazine-style format included interviews, reports, music film-clips (music videos) and occasional footage of local and visiting international acts in concert.

== Production and broadcast ==
A feature of every episode was the daily live-in-the-studio performance segment, especially recorded by GTK. These segments featured notable and lesser-known Australian acts of the period. The band chosen as featured group for the week would often record their own 'cover' version of the GTK theme (composed by Hans Poulsen), which was played at the start of each of the programs.

These live performance segments were recorded to videotape in Studio 21 at the ABC's Gore Hill, Sydney complex, which had originally been used for drama during the early days of live-to-air production. Groups were called in early on Monday mornings, and four songs/pieces were recorded, with one segment broadcast each day. Another aspect that makes this GTK footage important is that many of the bands were asked to play material from their live repertoire—including cover versions—rather than their current or recent hit song/s, since it was felt that the groups would perform these better, and because it would show off other facets of their music. Because these live performances were videotaped and later transferred to film for broadcast, many of these performances were preserved, despite the fact that all of the broadcast master tapes were later erased.

Because full-time colour television transmissions were not introduced in Australia until early 1975, most of GTK was shot on black-and-white film or videotape, although some segments of programs in c. 1974 are known to have been shot in colour.

It was thought for many years that most of the videotapes of the program had been erased during an ABC economy drive in the late 1970s. It was discovered during and after the closure of the old Gore Hill studio complex that much of the series had been preserved on "telerecordings", which were film recordings transferred from videotape. Estimates from the ABC have indicated that almost 100% of the series has been saved, which included interviews with Pete Townshend and Marc Bolan and colour footage of Lou Reed's 1974 Sydney concert (including one of the earliest known films of Reed performing "Walk on the Wild Side") and his disengaged Sydney press conference, which features noted Australian television journalist Ian Leslie.
