= A Thousand Suns (Russell Morris album) =

Studio album by Russell Morris
- Released: November 1991
- Genre: Blues rock
- Length: 52:03
- Label: Festival
- Producer: Mark Moffatt

Russell Morris chronology
Almost Frantic (1981)	A Thousand Suns (1991)	Off the Shelf (2002)

Singles from Russell Morris
- 1. "The Real Thing (1990 mix)" Released: December 1990; 2. "Tartan Lines" Released: March 1991; 3. "A Thousand Suns" Released: July 1991; 4. "Stay With You" Released: 1991

A Thousand Suns is a studio album by Australian singer songwriter Russell Morris. It was released in November 1991 and is his first album on the ARIA Chart, at number 98. Four singles were released from the album, including a remix of Morris' 1969 number-one single, "The Real Thing".

== Reception ==
Bevan Hannan of The Canberra Times described A Thousand Suns, "[he is] writing prodigiously with aim of launching a revival... [it] is in the damage control category – you can slip it into your stereo and play in the background without offending any tastes." Australian musicologist Ian McFarlane observed, "During the early 1990s there was something of a [Morris] revival... [he] issued a new album... [which] boasted a contemporary studio sheen and featured guest musicians."

== Track listing ==
1. "A Thousand Suns" (Russell Morris, Chong Lim) – 5:00
2. "Tartan Lines" (Morris, Lim) – 4:19
3. "Stay with You" (Morris) – 4:20
4. "Child Inside" (Lim, Morris) – 5:00
5. "New Dawn"(Lim, Morris) – 5:03
6. "Jungle at Night" (Tibor Jopiosh, Morris) – 4:29
7. "Between the Waves" (Lim, Morris) – 4:14
8. "The Bigger They Come" (Lim, Morris) – 4:59
9. "Steal You Away" (David Briggs, Morris, Marshall Parker) – 3:52
10. "Over Excited" (Lim, Morris) – 4:27
11. "The Real Thing" (1990 Mix) (John B Young) – 6:28
12. "Stay with You" (Morris) (A-Side Single) (bonus track)
13. "Turn to Stone" (Morris) (B-Side Single) (bonus track)
14. "This Bird Has Flown" (demo version) (bonus track)

== Credits ==
- Russell Morris – guitar, vocals
- Chong Lim – keyboards
- Graham Thompson, Ian Belton, Jim Landers – bass guitar
- Mark Punch, Mark Moffatt, Ben Butler, Rex Goh – guitar
- Ricky Fataar – drums, percussion
- Andrew Thompson – saxophone
- Venetta Fields, Mark Williams, Mark Punch, Shauna Jensen, Kevin Bennett, Taya Francis – backing vocals

== Charts ==
Chart performance for A Thousand Suns
Chart (1991)	Peak position
Australian Albums (ARIA)	98
