= Darryl Cotton =

Australian pop singer-songwriter, television presenter and actor (1949–2012)

- Cotton in 1997

Background information
- Born: Darryl Grant Cotton; 4 September 1949; Adelaide, South Australia, Australia
- Died: 27 July 2012 (aged 62) Melbourne, Victoria, Australia
- Genres: Rock, pop
- Occupations: Singer-songwriter; actor; television presenter
- Instruments: Vocals, guitar
- Years active: 1965–2012
- Labels: EMI; Sparmac; Oz; Hammard; Warner Bros.; MGM; 20th Century; CBS
- Formerly of: The Murmen; Down the Line; Zoot, Darryl and Bee; Frieze; Friends; Cotton, Lloyd & Christian; Darryl Cotton Band; Darryl Cotton & the Charts; Darryl Cotton & the Divers; Burns Cotton & Morris; Cotton Keays & Morris

Darryl Grant Cotton (4 September 1949 – 27 July 2012) was an Australian pop, rock singer-songwriter, television presenter and actor. He was a founding member of Australian rock group Zoot in 1965, with Beeb Birtles, and were later joined by Rick Brewer and Rick Springfield. As a solo artist Cotton released the albums Best Seat in the House (1980), It's Rock 'n' Good Fun (1984) and Let the Children Sing (1994). In April 1980 his biggest solo hit, "Same Old Girl", which was co-written by Cotton, peaked at No. 6 on the Australian Kent Music Report Singles Chart. He acted in the TV soap opera The Young Doctors (1979), and on stage as Joseph in the theatre production of Joseph and the Amazing Technicolour Dreamcoat (1983).

He presented TV shows Summer Rock (1979 and 1980) and The Early Bird Show (1985 to 1989). In 1996 he formed Burns Cotton & Morris with fellow 1960s pop singers, Ronnie Burns and Russell Morris. In 2000 Burns retired from the trio and, with Jim Keays, they became Cotton Keays & Morris. In May 2012, Cotton was diagnosed with liver cancer and died on 27 July 2012, aged 62.

== Early life ==
Darryl Grant Cotton was born on 4 September 1949 in Adelaide to mother Gloria, and grew up in the suburb of Christies Beach.

== Music career ==
=== 1965–1971: Zoot ===
In 1965 Cotton was the lead vocalist for The Murmen, when he formed a pop rock covers band, Down the Line, with local rivals, Times Unlimited's Gerard Bertelkamp (later known as Beeb Birtles) on vocals and bass guitar, John D'Arcy on guitar and vocals, and Ted Higgins on drums. In mid-1967 the group changed their name to Zoot and increased the original content played. They entered the South Australian heats of Hoadley's Battle of the Sounds, finishing second in a tense contest to The Masters Apprentices. In mid-1968, Zoot relocated to Melbourne, where their management promoted them under the slogan "Think Pink – Think Zoot"—all band members wore pink costumes; Cotton's car was repainted pink; his pet dog, Monty, had its fur dyed pink; and the venue, Birties Disco, was pink-themed throughout. In September Rick Brewer, Cotton's bandmate from The Murmen, joined on drums.

Cotton and Birtles co-wrote "Little Roland Lost" which was issued as the B-side on Zoot's June 1969 single, "Monty & Me". The A-side was produced by Go-Set writer Ian Meldrum (later hosted TV pop music series, Countdown), while the B-side was produced by Terry Britten. "Monty & Me"—referenced Cotton's dog—which reached the Go-Set Top 40. Zoot were voted Top Australian Group in Go-Set's pop poll published in June 1969. In July 1969 they undertook a tour through the eastern Australian states with Ronnie Burns, The Sect and Jon Blanchfield on the bill. In September Rick Springfield (ex-Wickedy Wak) joined on lead guitar and vocals. For Zoot, national tour brought increased media ridicule, peer envy and scorn from detractors—much of the criticism was homophobic, for their continuing use of pink outfits, where they were described as "pretty pink pansies". In December when the tour reached Brisbane, Cotton was injured in an assault by street toughs.

Early in 1970 Zoot finally discarded their pink outfits and attempted to shift their image and music towards heavier rock from the earlier teeny-bopper pop. In December 1970, they released their most successful single, "Eleanor Rigby", which was a hard rock cover version of the Beatles' ballad and by March 1971 it had peaked in the top five. On Go-Set's Top Records for the Year of 1971 it finished at No. 12. In May 1971 despite the top-30 charting of their next single, "Freak", the group disbanded.

=== 1971–1972: Frieze ===
Cotton and Birtles formed Darryl and Beeb as a pop, soft rock duo but soon changed their name to Frieze when they were sponsored by Frieze Brothers (a clothing company). In September 1971 they released a cover version of the Mann–Weil track, "Feelings", on Sparmac Records.

In March 1972, the Cotton-penned single, "Try Yourself", was released under the name, Darryl and Beeb Frieze. In May they followed with their debut album, 1972 B. C., on Warner Bros. Records, using session musicians. By June 1972 Frieze had disbanded and Cotton issued "Why Do Little Kids Have to Die", from 1972 B. C. as his debut solo single. In July 1972 Cotton travelled to the United Kingdom while Birtles joined Mississippi which, in 1975, evolved into Little River Band.

=== 1973-1977: Friends & Cotton, Lloyd and Christian ===
Early in 1973 Cotton joined United States-based group, Friends, with Michael Lloyd and Australian-raised singer-songwriter Steve Kipner (ex-Steve and the Board, Tin Tin). They released a single, "Gonna Have a Good Time" (a cover of The Easybeats's song "Good Times") backed by "Would You Laugh" which was co-written by Cotton with Lloyd and Kipner. Friends followed with a self-titled album before Cotton and Lloyd left to form a vocal trio, Cotton, Lloyd and Christian with Chris Christian and released two studio albums between 1975 and 1976.

Cotton based himself in Los Angeles where he also worked as a singer and songwriter and performed with Olivia Newton-John, The Osmonds, Shaun Cassidy and Cliff Richard. His songwriting credits include work for Donny Osmond and Marie Osmond, Engelbert Humperdinck and The New Seekers.

=== 1978-1984: Best Seat in the House & It's Rock 'n' Good Fun ===
In early 1978 Cotton returned to Australia and signed with Oz Records. In August 1978, he released a solo single, "Don't Let It Get to You". From January 1979 Cotton hosted a TV music series, Summer Rock, on Adelaide's Nine Network. Other solo singles followed, "I Don't Want to Lose You" in February 1979 and "Glamour Girl" in July 1979. At about that time Cotton acted on the Australian soap opera The Young Doctors for one season and followed with another series of Summer Rock in early 1980.

In February 1980, Cotton released his most successful solo single, "Same Old Girl", which reached top ten on the Kent Music Report Singles Chart. "Same Old Girl" was co-written with former bandmate Christian. Cotton's work in 1980 earned him an award for Best Solo Male Performance, 10 years after Zoot had won a similar award for a group. Best Seat in the House was released on EMI Records in April 1980 and was produced by Christian. Cotton formed a backing band, The Charts, with Joey Amenta on lead guitar (ex-Taste, Redhouse, Russell Morris Band), Andy Buchanan on drums, Randy Bulpin on guitar (Mondo Rock), Terry Davidson on keyboards and Simon Gyllies on bass guitar (Mondo Rock). In 1983 Cotton appeared in the lead role of the Australian stage production of Andrew Lloyd Webber and Tim Rice's Joseph and the Amazing Technicolor Dreamcoat. In 1984 he released his second solo album, It's Rock 'n' Good Fun on Hammard Records.

=== 1985-2011: Continued success ===
From 1985 to 1989 Cotton was a co-host, with Marie Van Maaren, on Network Ten's The Early Bird Show, a Saturday morning children's TV variety show, where he worked alongside Marty the Monster.

In 1989, Cotton was awarded the Advance Australia Award for his services to the community, acknowledging his support and assistance to numerous charities and public organisations. He also sang the lyrics to the song "Surfin" from the TV program Pugwall's Summer.

In 1994 Cotton released a children's album, Just for Kids, on DC Records.

In 1996 he formed Burns Cotton & Morris with fellow 1960s pop singers, Ronnie Burns and Russell Morris, which issued a self-titled album. The album included three tracks from each artist's earlier career and three new songs. In 2000 Burns retired from the trio and, with Jim Keays (ex-The Masters Apprentices), they became Cotton Keays & Morris, which also released a self-titled album.

Since 1987 Cotton performed with the Australian Youth Choir and released numerous albums in the early 2000s. Cotton was the patron of the associated National Institute of Youth Performing Arts Australia. His solo performances were backed by the Darryl Cotton Band, which, in 2005, consisted of Ashley Robinson on guitar and backing vocals, Peter Valentine on keyboards and backing vocals, Alejandro Vega on drums and percussion, Tim Wilson on saxophone, flute and backing vocals; and were sometimes augmented by Lisa Edwards and Wendy Stapleton on vocals. Darry Cotton Band performed at corporate functions with a repertoire that included music from 1960s pop to 1990s and early 2000s work.

In 2011 Zoot reunited for a short performance cruise out from Miami with the line-up of Cotton joined by Birtles, Brewer and Springfield.

=== 2012: Death ===
In May 2012, Cotton was diagnosed with liver cancer, his manager Jeff Joseph announced that Cotton was receiving chemotherapy "[h]e is resting comfortably and letting the treatment take its course". On 27 July 2012 Cotton died. On 12 May he had performed his last gig, with Cotton Keays & Morris, at a Sydney RSL club. In July Keays recalled, "[a]bout six weeks ago... we were up in Sydney, he's an asthmatic and used to cough a lot, [...] we were driving back from the gig and he was just coughing so badly, and Russell was driving, and said 'Do you want us to drive you to the hospital?'".

== Personal life ==
On 16 July 1977 Darryl Cotton married Cheryl Forehead; the couple had two children. Darryl Cotton fathered two other children from previous relationships before his marriage to Cheryl Forehead. Cotton died on 27 July 2012, eleven days after the couple's 35th anniversary, aged 62.

== Non-music Associations ==
Darryl Cotton played Australian rules football as a youth for the Christies Beach Football Club, captaining the Senior Colts in 1965.

== Discography ==
- For additional albums and singles, see Zoot discography, Cotton, Lloyd and Christian, Burns Cotton & Morris & Cotton Keays & Morris

=== Albums ===
List of albums with Australian chart positions
Title	Album details	Peak chart positions
Title	Album details	AUS
1972 B. C. (as Frieze)	Released: May 1972; Format: LP; Label: Warner Bros. Records WS 20006	40
Cotton, Lloyd & Christian (as Cotton, Lloyd & Christian)	Released: 1975; Format: LP; Label: 20th Century Records (L 35664)	–
Number Two (as Cotton, Lloyd & Christian)	Released: 1976; Format: LP; Label: 20th Century Records (L 36055)	–
Best Seat in the House	Released: April 1980; Format: LP; Label: EMI Records EMX.101	56
It's Rock 'n' Good Fun	Released: 1984; Format: LP; Label: Hammard Records HAM 107	–
Just for Kids	Released: 1988; Format: LP, Cass; Label: Hammard Records HAM 183	–
Let the Children Sing	Released: 1994; Format: CD; Label: DC Records	–
Songs of Australia for Christmas (with The Australian Youth Choir and Victoria State Children's Choir)	Released: 2000; Format: CD; Label: AYC (AYC1)	–
Absolute 80s (with The Australian Youth Choir)	Released: 2001; Format: CD; Label: AYC	–
Songs from Land Down Under (with The Australian Youth Choir)	Released: 2002; Format: CD; Label: National Institute Of Youth Performing Arts	–
The Bright Side of Life (with The Australian Youth Choir)	Released: 2003; Format: CD; Label: National Institute Of Youth Performing Arts	–
Happy Together (with The Australian Youth Choir)	Released: 2004; Format: CD; Label: National Institute Of Youth Performing Arts	–

=== Singles ===
List of singles with Australian chart positions
Title	Year	Peak chart positions	Album
Title	Year	AUS	Album
"Feelings" (as Frieze)	1971	81	non-album single
"Try Yourself" (as Darryl and Beeb Frieze)	1972	–	1972 B. C.
"Why Do Little Kids Have to Die?" (Note: Ian McFarlane has "Why Do Little Kids Have to Die?" as Cotton's debut solo single. In Kent Music Report, the song is credited to Cotton. Duncan Kimball has it as a Frieze single.)	1972	58	1972 B. C.
"Don't Play with the One Who Loves You" (as Cotton, Lloyd and Christian)	1975	–	Cotton, Lloyd & Christian
"I Can Sing, I Can Dance" (as Cotton, Lloyd and Christian)	1975	–	Cotton, Lloyd & Christian
"I Go to Pieces" (as Cotton, Lloyd and Christian)	1975	62	Cotton, Lloyd & Christian
"Crying in the Rain" (as Cotton, Lloyd and Christian)	1976	90	Number Two
"Don't Let It Get to You"	1978	44	Best Seat in the House
"I Don't Want to Lose You"	1979	74	non-album singles
"Glamour Girl"	1979	–	non-album singles
"Same Old Girl"	1980	6	Best Seat in the House
"Here Comes Another Heartache"	1980	89	Best Seat in the House
"Little Red Book"	1981	48	non-album singles
"Nice Girls"	1981	–	non-album singles
"Baby You're Changing" (with Heather Favell)	1983	–	non-album singles
"Swinging School	1984	–	It's Rock 'n' Good Fun

== Awards and nominations ==
Award	Year	Recipient(s) and nominee(s)	Category	Result	Ref.
ARIA Music Awards	1989	Just For Kids	Best Children's Album	Nominated	
