= Jumpstart Diary =

Studio album by Russell Morris
- Released: 1 June 2008
- Genre: Pop, rock
- Length: 50:48
- Label: Russell Morris, One Stop Entertainment
- Producer: Russell Morris, Peter Robinson

Russell Morris chronology
Live at the Con (2007)	Jumpstart Diary (2008)	The Greatest Hits (2008)

Jumpstart Diary is a studio album by Australian singer songwriter Russell Morris. The album was released on 1 June 2008, just prior to his induction into the ARIA Hall of Fame.

The album is a collaboration between Morris and Australian guitarist, Peter Robinson, who co-wrote numerous tracks and was the co-producer and designer of the sleeve. Robinson plays multiple instruments, including: guitar, bass, piano and strings and provided backing vocals.

In an interview with The Music AU in 2013, Morris said the album had “been received with a collective yawn”.

== Critical reception ==
Natalie Salvo from The Dwarf said; "The thirteen songs are a little rough n' ready as Morris' vocals cannot always hit the high notes of his youth, however, judging by the slick production, the songs have the makings of being Triple M favourites. In all, it is commercial rock that is often quite easy on the ear and presented either in its finery or blandness, depending on which side of the fence you sit on." she added "The album does overstay its welcome and could have possibly been improved with a few less songs. And while it is no "The Real Thing", it does serve to prove that we do not need this song to be re-done or rehashed. Instead Jumpstart Diary is about expressing mature emotions in a new format."

In 2008, Songland Records owner Brian 'Frog' Harris said; "Russell's new album is the strongest record of his career."

== Track listing ==
1. "Get Your Mind Right" (Russell Morris) - 4:44
2. "Coming On Strong" (Russell Morris) - 3:57
3. "Keeping My Distance" (Russell Morris) - 3:55
4. "Do it for Me" (Russell Morris) - 3:19
5. "Blown Away" (Russell Morris) - 3:45
6. "All Over You" (Russell Morris) - 4:01
7. "I Want You" (Russell Morris) - 3:45
8. "It is What it is" (Russell Morris) - 4:14
9. "Welcome to the Real World" (Russell Morris) - 3:41
10. "Rise" (Russell Morris) - 3:52
11. "I Will Wait for You" (Russell Morris) - 3:45
12. "As Far as I Remember" (Russell Morris) - 4:06
13. "What's Gone is Gone" (Russell Morris) - 3:44

== Charts ==
Jumpstart Diary debuted at Number 13 on the NSW/ACT Independent Chart for the week commencing 10 June 2008. This result is based on one record store's sales, Songland Records in Canberra, where Morris had done an in-store appearance.
