= Black and Blue Heart =

Studio album by Russell Morris
- Released: 5 April 2019
- Genre: Rock
- Label: Liberation Records
- Producer: Bernard Fanning and Nick DiDia

Russell Morris chronology
Red Dirt – Red Heart (2015)	Black and Blue Heart (2019)

Singles from Black and Blue Heart
- 1. "Black and Blue Heart" Released: March 2019

Black and Blue Heart is a studio album by Australian singer–songwriter Russell Morris. It was released on 5 April 2019 by Liberation Records. Upon release Morris said "The band, the producers, the studio… it all fell into place beautifully but the songs came from where I came from. I went back to the well and I drank from the fountainhead, and this is the result."

The album was promoted by an Australian tour starting in Darwin on 12 April and concluding in Bentleigh East on 28 June 2019.

== Reception ==
Zoë Radas from Stack Magazine said the album was produced by Bernard Fanning and Nick DiDia and called it "an unlikely partnership" but added "they have helped Morris craft perhaps his finest album. As producers, they're not afraid to allow the songs to breathe. Less is more on this record, where the songs slowly get under your skin." adding "Morris' voice sounds as fresh as when he was starting out, though seared with decades of wisdom."

== Track listing ==
Standard edition
No.	Title	Writer(s)	Length
1.	"Ain't No Angel"	Russell Morris / Gary Paige	3:26
2.	"Is There Anybody Out There?"	Russell Morris / Eddie Rayner	4:18
3.	"Sitting Pretty"	Russell Morris / Peter Robinson	3:42
4.	"Black and Blue Heart"	Russell Morris / Gary Hammond / Paul O'Gorman	5:03
5.	"See You Go"	Russell Morris / Mitchell Cairns	3:26
6.	"Full Moon"	Russell Morris	3:15
7.	"Not My Lucky Day"	Russell Morris	3:42
8.	"Fat Man and the Priest"	Russell Morris	3:52
9.	"Asleep at the Wheel"	Russell Morris	4:39
10.	"Witness Protection"	Russell Morris	4:08
11.	"Forever Remember"	Russell Morris	4:12

== Charts ==
Chart (2019)	Peak position
Australian Albums (ARIA)	12

== Release history ==
Region	Date	Format	Edition(s)	Label	Catalogue
Various	5 April 2019	CD; digital download; streaming	Standard	Liberation	BLOOD52
Australia	3 May 2019	LP	Limited edition purple vinyl	Liberation	BLOODLP52
