= Ronnie Burns (singer) =

Australian rock singer-songwriter and musician (born 1946)

Ronnie Burns AM
- Born: Ronald Leslie Burns; 8 September 1946 (age 80); Melbourne, Victoria, Australia
- Genres: Folk, pop
- Occupations: Musician; singer; rhythm guitarist; composer
- Instrument: Vocals
- Years active: 1963–2000
- Labels: Spin, RCA, Festival

Ronald Leslie Burns (born 8 September 1946) is an Australian retired rock singer-songwriter and musician.

He fronted the Melbourne band "The Flies" in the early 1960s, followed by a solo career into the 1970s and was a member of Burns Cotton & Morris in the 1990s.

His solo hit single, "Smiley" wriitten bu Johnny Young peaked at number two on the Go-Set National Top 40 chart in 1970.

Burns retired from performing in 2000, however he was awarded a Member of the Order of Australia on 10 June 2023 with the citation "For significant service to the community, particularly to children recovering from illness and trauma, and to the entertainment industry".

== Early years and The Flies ==
Burns was born on 8 September 1946, and was raised in Elwood, Victoria. His father was a butcher, his mother Edna was a fan of vaudeville and his brother Frank, who is five years older, was a drummer. To buy his first guitar for 10 shillings, Burns had part-time jobs selling newspapers, working in a milk bar and in a fruit shop. He joined his brother's folk music band as lead vocalist and was working in a clothes store. He transferred to the Myers Store' display window but was fired for having long hair.

However he had already joined the Mod band The Flies in early 1964., They won a Moomba band competition for a group most like The Beatles.

The line-up consisted of lead singer Burns (also played rhythm guitar) with Themi Adams (aka Themistocles Adamopoulo, bass guitar), John Thomas (lead guitar) and Hank Wallace (drums).

Concert promoter Garry Spry was looking for a resident band for his new rock club, Pinocchios, which opened in March. The Flies were reputedly the first long-haired band in Australia and drew heavily on The Beatles for their musical and fashion influences and soon acquired a large local following. Their repertoire included covers of The Searchers, The Hollies and Herman's Hermits. Spry became their manager and secured a recording deal with RCA Records – they started recording their first single, "Tell Her That", in Sydney, with EMI producer-engineer David Mackay, it was released in June 1964 and was a local hit in Melbourne.

Burns befriended Ian Meldrum, who was then a university law student looking for somewhere to stay, whose two-week visit became nine years of boarding at his parents' home. Meldrum later had a career as a pop music commentator, TV personality and record producer. The two were famously ejected from The Beatles' June 1964 Melbourne concert, because Meldrum was screaming too loudly. Meldrum later promoted Burns solo career in his writing for the weekly teen newspaper, Go-Set, which became a pop music "bible" by the late 1960s. After August, The Flies started appearing on television pop music The Go!! Show on ATV-0 – initially broadcast only in Melbourne but later extended to Sydney on TEN-10.

After six months residency at Pinocchios, Spry started booking The Flies into Sydney where they were arrested for vagrancy for having hair over their shoulders, but it was great publicity making all the papers. Back in Melbourne, Spry employed Carole West to organise a publicity shoot for TV and press to display his band having their long hair done at a women's hair salon in South Yarra. During the shoot, Burns sang with his guitar and was joined by apprentice hairdresser Lynne Randell – who was promptly signed by Spry and managed by West. In January 1965, they supported The Rolling Stones and Roy Orbison on their first Australian tour.

In May 1965, The Flies embarked on their own six-week tour of Victoria, New South Wales, South Australia and Tasmania, becoming one of the first Australian beat groups to mount an extensive national tour. The Flies recorded their second single "Doing the Mod", in Sydney, which was released in June and was a hit in both there and Melbourne and became their signature song. Aside from The Go!! Show the band also appeared on the related ATV-0 offering, Kommotion. This show also included local artists miming to international hits. One of the dancers / mimers on Kommotion was Maggie Stewart, she also danced on ABC TV's Dig We Must where Burns introduced himself, the couple married in 1970. Another mimer on Kommotion was Burns's friend Meldrum. During The Flies national tour a third single "Can't You Feel" – composed by Burns and Thomas – became a minor national hit. By this time The Flies, alongside Billy Thorpe & the Aztecs, had become one of the most popular bands in the country.

In September 1965, Burns decided to leave The Flies to go solo – his place was taken by Peter Nicoll from The Wild Colonials. Promoter Jeff Joseph who ran Pinocchios Promotions – the booking agency for Spry's artists – left and took over as Burns's manager. An extended play was released by RCA consisting of four tracks from their singles, but was attributed to The Flies, vocal by Ronnie Burns.

== Solo years ==
As a solo artist, Burns became one of Australia's most popular male pop singers from the mid-1960s to the early 1970s. His first single, "Very Last Day" was released in June 1966 on Spin Records and peaked at No. 12 on Melbourne's Top 40 singles chart. His second single, "True True Lovin" followed in August and reached No. 15. Go-Set published their inaugural pop poll on 5 October, Normie Rowe won 'Australian Male Vocal' of the year – he was later called 'King of Pop' – with Burns second and Johnny Young third. Also in October, Go-Set published Australia's first National Top 40 singles chart, Burns's third single, "Coalman", which was released in January 1967, peaked at No. 6. Another Top 20 single was "Exit, Stage Right" in June. In August, Burns topped the Go-Set pop poll for 'Top Male Singer' and ABC-TV broadcast a documentary, The Life of Ronnie Burns. Over the next four years, he consistently finished third on the Go-Set pop poll.

Burns had several minor national hits – "We Had a Good Thing Going" (October 1967), "When I Was Six Years Old" (March 1968), written for him by Brian Cadd and Max Ross of The Groop, and "Age of Consent" (January 1969), written by Terry Britten of The Twilights. Most of Burns's 1967 material was written by The Bee Gees, the tracks appeared on his first solo album Ronnie (Spin, July 1967). The Bee Gees had written and recorded them in Sydney in late 1966, which included their breakthrough hit "Spicks and Specks". Shortly afterward the group left Australia to return to the UK. The tracks were intended for a planned album which was not released, so they were sent to Burns who shared the same recording management. Burns provided his own vocals over The Bee Gees' backing tracks. The original versions were eventually issued by Festival Records on The Bee Gees compilation albums, including a 2-CD set Brilliant from Birth (2000).

In 1968, Burns appeared on Once Upon a Twilight, the pilot for a projected TV series starring The Twilights, he performed the Barry Gibb song 'In The Morning' with the group and comedian Mary Hardy, but plans for the series were scrapped after the sponsor withdrew support. Late that year, former pop star Johnny Young was writing "The Real Thing" as a ballad and intended to offer it to Burns. Young was practising it in a dressing room while TV pop show Uptight was being recorded. Meldrum happened to walk by and wanted it for his newly managed artist, Russell Morris (ex-Somebody's Image). Morris recorded it as his debut solo single with Meldrum's production turning it into a six-minute long psychedelic pop song – it became a national No. 1 hit in May 1969.

"Smiley", Burns's biggest hit, reached number two on the Go-Set National Top 40 in February 1970. It was also written by Young, who was later involved in television production (see Young Talent Time). Young revealed that the song was inspired by the experiences of fellow pop star, Rowe, whose music career ended in late 1967 when he was drafted into the Australian Army and he was sent to fight in the Vietnam War. It is one of the first Australian pop singles released in stereo and features a lavish orchestral and vocal arrangement by John Farrar (ex The Strangers) who went on to write and/or produce many hits for Olivia Newton-John.

In the early 1970s, Burns had moved from pop to more adult contemporary music, he toured the club and cabaret circuit. Further Young-penned singles were "The Prophet" in January 1971 and "If I Die" in 1972. He appeared on variety TV shows including as a judge on Young Talent Time, where Maggie Burns was a choreographer. Burns's last single, "Brand New Number One" was released in 1980 on the Fable Records label.

== Burns, Cotton & Morris ==
Burns later supported touring artists such as Peter, Paul & Mary, and The Bee Gees. In 1996 he formed a trio with fellow Australian 1960's pop singers Morris and Darryl Cotton (ex Zoot) called Burns, Cotton & Morris which toured for several years and released a self-titled album. He retired from performing in 2000 – his place was taken by former Masters Apprentices lead singer Jim Keays with the trio renamed as Cotton Keays & Morris.

== Meeting with Barry Gibb ==
Burns went to England to visit his friend Barry Gibb. Gibb, with his male assistant, picked up Burns at the airport. Burns recalled, "Barry always impressed me. I'm into fashion, I like nice clothes, and Barry looked sensational at the airport. Beautiful high collared white shirt".

On Burns's arrival at Gibb's flat, he gave his host a gift replica gun, as Burns was aware of his fondness for them. Gibb then took his guest downstairs to show him his gun collection. Handing Burns a German Luger pistol, Gibb uttered the words, "Careful, it has a hair trig—". Before Gibb could finish what he was saying, the gun went off and its bullet parted his hair, missing his head by millimetres. According to Burns, "Barry just went white".

Burns later returned to his home in Australia with a demo version of Gibb's song "One Bad Thing" in his suitcase.

== Personal life ==
Burns married Maggie Stewart, a dancer he met on Kommotion. They had a daughter, Lauren Burns, on 8 June 1974 and a son Michael seven years later. Lauren is a Taekwondo competitor and won a gold medal at the 2000 Olympics in Sydney.

The Burns family lives in Tasmania. He tours on the motivational speaking circuit. In 1998, the couple founded Appin Hall Children's Foundation, a refuge for orphans of war and children with chronic illness.

Ronnie and Maggie appeared on the cover of the 2012/13 Burnie White and Yellow Pages under the theme 'A Helping Hand, The Aussie Way'. The pair are photographed at Appin Hall and were selected for their work with children through the establishment of Appin Hall Children's Foundation. On 10 June 2013 Burns was awarded a Member of the Order of Australia with the citation "For significant service to the community, particularly to children recovering from illness and trauma, and to the entertainment industry".

== Discography ==
=== Studio albums ===
Title	Album details	Peak chart positions
Title	Album details	AUS
Ronnie	Released: 1967; Label: Spin (EL-32,439)	—N/a
Smiley	Released: 1969; Label: Spin (EL-33,727)	—N/a
Virgo	Released: August 1971; Label: Spin (SEL-934060)	26
We've Only Just Begun	Released: 1972; Label: Festival Records (FL 34682)	-
Listen to the Band (Volume 2) (with The Kinderplay Rockettes)	Released: 1977; Label: John Bye Productions (JBP 7709)	-

=== Compilation albums ===
Title	Album details	Peak chart positions
Title	Album details	AUS
Best of Ronnie Burns	Released: 1972; Label: Spin (SEL 934359)	-
For You	Released: 1974; Label: Summit (SRA 250087)	-
Enter Stage Left	Released: 1994; Label: Festival Records (D 19557)	-
This Is Ronnie Burns	Released: 2019; Label: Warner Music Australia (5419705614_	-

=== Singles ===
Year	Single	Chart Positions	Notes
Year	Single	AUS	Notes
1966	"Very Last Day"	45	#12 Melbourne
1966	"True True Lovin'"	50	#15 Melbourne
1967	"Coalman"^{[A]}	6	#5 Melbourne, No. 5 Sydney, No. 8 Brisbane, No. 8 Adelaide
1967	"Exit, Stage Right"	23	#12 Melbourne, No. 15 Sydney, No. 15 Brisbane
1967	"We Had a Good Thing Going"	33	
1967	"When I Was Six Years Old"	30	
1968	"Age of Consent"	18	
1969	"How'd We Ever Get This Way"	82	
1969	"Smiley"	2	#3 Melbourne, No. 1 Sydney, No. 3 Brisbane, No. 10 Adelaide
1970	"Prophet"	30	
1970	"One Bad Thing"	76	

- A B-side "All The King's Horses" charted as a flipside in Sydney.

== Awards and nominations ==
=== Go-Set Pop Poll ===
The Go-Set Pop Poll was coordinated by teen-oriented pop music newspaper, Go-Set and was established in February 1966 and conducted an annual poll during 1966 to 1972 of its readers to determine the most popular personalities.

Year	Nominee / work	Award	Result
1966	himself	Australian Acts: Male Vocal	2nd
1967	himself	Australian Acts: Male Singer	1st
1968	himself	Australian Acts: Top Male Singer	3rd
1969	himself	Australian Acts: Top Male Singer	3rd
1970	himself	Australian Acts: Male	3rd
1971	himself	Australian Acts: Male	3rd
1971	Virgo	Best Album	3rd

=== Mo Awards ===
The Australian Entertainment Mo Awards (commonly known informally as the Mo Awards), were annual Australian entertainment industry awards. They recognise achievements in live entertainment in Australia from 1975 to 2016. Ronnie Burns won one award in that time.

Year	Nominee / work	Award	Result (wins only)
2011	Ronnie Burns	John Campbell Fellowship Award	Won
