= Turn It On (Russell Morris album) =

Studio album by Russell Morris
- Released: August 1976
- Recorded: The Hit Factory, New York City
- Genre: Pop, rock, Progressive Rock
- Length: 36:07
- Label: Wizard Records (Australia); RCA Records (USA)
- Producer: Edward Germano

Russell Morris chronology
Russell Morris (1975)	Turn It On (1976)	Retrospective (1978)

Singles from Russell Morris
- 1. "Cloudy Day" / "R.J.S.S." Released: July 1976; 2. "Wolves in White" / "Two Wheeled Flyer" Released: November 1976

Alternative cover
- American edition

Turn It On is the third studio album by Australian singer songwriter Russell Morris and second on label Wizard Records/RCA and was released in August 1976. The album was released in the United States of America under the title 2.

== Track listing ==
Side one
No.	Title	Writer(s)	Length
1.	"Broken Egg Shells"	Russell Morris	4:26
2.	"R.J.S.S." (Running, Jumping, Standing Still)	Russell Morris	3:27
3.	"Superman"	Russell Morris	3:19
4.	"Cloudy Day"	Russell Morris	3:04
5.	"So Good to See It"	Russell Morris	5:32

Side two
No.	Title	Writer(s)	Length
1.	"Wolves In White"	Russell Morris	4:11
2.	"Get You Where You Want"	Russell Morris	3:18
3.	"Ever Lovin' Woman"	Russell Morris	3:33
4.	"Two-Wheeled Flyer"	Russell Morris	2:53
5.	"Winter Song"	Russell Morris	2:24

== Credits ==
- Bass – Anthony Jackson
- Composed By – Russell Morris
- Drums – Rick Marotta, Steve Gadd
- Guitar – Gene Barkin, Hugh McCracken, Russell Morris
- Keyboards – Roy Bitten
- Percussion – Ralph McDonald
- Synthesizer – Jean-Yves Labat
