= Red Dirt – Red Heart =

Red Dirt - Red Heart

Studio album by Russell Morris
- Released: 23 October 2015
- Recorded: 2015
- Genres: Rock, blues, folk
- Length: 48:01
- Labels: Roustabout Records, Chugg Records
- Producer: Mitch Cairns

Russell Morris chronology
Van Diemen's Land (2014)	Red Dirt - Red Heart (2015)	Black and Blue Heart (2019)

Red Dirt – Red Heart is a studio album by Australian singer–songwriter Russell Morris. It was released on 23 October 2015 by Roustabout Records/ Chugg Records and peaked at number 21 on the ARIA Charts.

At the ARIA Music Awards of 2016, the album won Best Blues and Roots Album.

== Background ==
Red Dirt - Red Heart is the third release in Morris' Australian blues 'n' roots trilogy. It follows Sharkmouth which focusses on back blocks of 1920s and 30s inner-city Melbourne while Van Diemen's Land focussed on larger events, such as the 1894 Australian shearers' strike and the 1850s Bendigo gold rush. Red Dirt - Red Heart focuses on the Australian interior; indigenous inhabitants, bushrangers, swagmen and The Nullarbor.

Red Dirt - Red Heart has an underlining story about the indigenous people with songs about life in central Australia such as "Alice Springs" but there are also some biographical songs such as "God Loves a Sinner" and "Tiger Snake" written by Morris about himself.

Morris said "Before I wrapped up these albums I had to include songs about the people who've been here for 40,000 to 50,00 years and their Aboriginal heroes like Bennelong and Pemulwuy. I got permission to do a song about the Kadaitcha Man by contacting the people from Skinnyfish Records and Gurrumul because I didn't want to offend anyone".

As Morris explains, the three-album project didn't begin as a trilogy; "I started off in 2012 wanting to do a blues album. Then I saw a photo of scam-artist Thomas 'Shark Jaws' Archer that inspired me to write a song about him". adding "Once I got through the first album I realised there was so many stories that I wanted to tell. Our tapestry of characters and places are so interesting. I have a passion for history"

In an interview on 6PR in December 2015, Morris said he believes Red Dirt - Red Heart is the best of the trilogy.

He promoted the album with a video clip and live performances of "Lonesome Road" on television and radio.

== Reception ==
Professional ratings
Review scores
Source	Rating
News.com.au	3.5/5 stars
The Music Au	4/5 stars
100% Rock Magazine	8/10 stars
The Australian	4/5 stars

Noel Mengel from News.com.au said; " Most of the album sticks to the blues template but "Nullarbor Sand" is a gentle folk-country reflection that suggests a musical direction worth exploring next time around. Bob Dylan and Leonard Cohen have kept the creative juices flowing into their 70s and 80s: Morris is intent on doing the same."

Andrew McDonald from the Music AU said; "The album's themes make for a worthy close to his trilogy, and deal with Australian history in a unique way, examining Indigenous culture in the face of perverse whiteness. Australiana is in full force on tunes like the harmonica-driven "Bennelong", and the honestly danceable "Lonesome Road". Morris knows his audience on this album, and plays to them without concern; this is not an experiment or a new side of him, and the album does feel overly long in its continued examination of Australiana, but for fans of the man, this will more than satisfy." adding "The album is an engrossing listen for a blues fan."

Shane Pinnegar from 100% Rock Magazine said; "The climax to Russell Morris's enormously successful Australiana trilogy is perhaps the most 'true blue', 'dinky-di Aussie' of the lot mining a folky blues seam as he sings of bushrangers and the wide open spaces of our great southern land".

Steeve Creedy from The Australian said; "Morris was deluged with accolades for Sharkmouth and Van Diemen’s Land. His friend and promoter Michael Chugg describes this as "a wonderful conclusion to an amazing trilogy". He would say that, but that doesn't mean it isn't true."

== Track listing ==
Standard edition
No.	Title	Length
1.	"Cut You Loose"	3:03
2.	"I Go Around"	3:58
3.	"Bennelong"	3:53
4.	"Goanna Man"	3:35
5.	"Lonesome Road"	2:31
6.	"Alice"	4:02
7.	"Kadaitcha Man"	4:48
8.	"God Loves a Sinner"	3:55
9.	"Moondyne Joe"	4:21
10.	"Tiger Snake"	3:47
11.	"Ben Hall"	4:15
12.	"Pemulwuy"	3:49
13.	"Nullarbor Sand"	2:04

== Tour ==
Morris toured the album throughout January and February 2016 .

== Charts ==
=== Weekly charts ===
Chart (2015)	Peak position
Australian Albums (ARIA)	21
Australian Jazz and Blues Albums Chart (ARIA)	1

=== Year-end charts ===
Chart (2015)	Position
Australian Jazz & Blues Albums Chart	5
Chart (2016)	Position
Australian Jazz & Blues Albums Chart	2
Chart (2017)	Position
Australian Jazz & Blues Albums Chart	32

== Release history ==
Region	Date	Format	Edition(s)	Label	Catalogue
Australia	23 October 2015	CD; digital download	Standard	Roustabout Records / Chugg Records	CHG008
