= Van Diemen's Land (album) =

Studio album by Russell Morris
- Released: 11 April 2014
- Recorded: 2013–14
- Genre: Rock, blues, folk
- Label: Fanfare, Ambition Records
- Producer: Mitch Cairns

Russell Morris chronology
The Very Best of Russell Morris (2013)	Van Diemen's Land (2014)	Red Dirt - Red Heart (2015)

Van Diemen's Land is a studio album by Australian singer–songwriter Russell Morris. It was released on 11 April 2014 by Fanfare, Ambition Records. The album peaked at number 4 on the ARIA Charts, becoming Morris' highest chart album in his career.

Van Diemen's Land covers great Australian characters and stories including Breaker Morant, Sandakan and Eureka Rebellion and features a host of special guest artists including Joe Camilleri, Rick Springfield, Rob Hirst (Midnight Oil), Scott Owen (The Living End), Ross Hannaford (Daddy Cool), Vika and Linda Bull, Phil Manning (Chain) and Joe Robinson.

Morris said; “Van Diemen’s Land is an album that has been an amazing experience to make. With the success of Sharkmouth, it really let me off my leash so to speak. It showed me that people want music that tells them a story and moves them.”

A music video for the song "Van Diemen's Land" was released on 11 August 2014. It was directed by Lucas Thyer and filmed in Blue Lake in the Central Highlands of Tasmania.

== Reception ==
Professional ratings
Review scores
Source	Rating
Renowned for Sound	3/5 stars
The Music Au	3/5 stars
Reverb Online	8/10 stars
Rolling Stone Australia	3.5/5 stars

Angus Fitz-Burden from Renowned for Sound said; "Other than the minimalist mid-album blues dirges "Breaker Morant" and "Loch and Gorge" and the telephone-filtered "Sandakan", the vast majority of the album doesn't really stray from the stock standard, no frills Aussie pub-band sound of the early ‘80s that you still seem to hear in seedy pubs throughout the land however virtually doesn’t exist anymore on the vast spectrum of modern music. While it’s definitely nice to hear some attention paid to intriguing, textured lyrical content nowadays, they kind of read like that dusty old book of bush poetry that sits unread to this day on the bookshelf in your dad’s home-office."

Liz Giuffre from The Music AU said; "Clearly yearning for an old Australia, or at least wanting to have fun with some old myths and styles of old music, Russell Morris has delivered a mellow collection with Van Diemen's Land. Morris mixes international influences with local references from over time for his latest release. [It's] a good collection of folk/blues and national myths delivered by a man who knows his way around the local biz."

Courtney Laura of Reverb Online said; "It is evident through the detailed lyrics that he has spent quality time researching wonderful Australian stories and national myths, and constructing them into a collection of stunning folk and blues tracks. Throughout the whole album, Morris’s voice doesn’t waver as he adapts his vocals to each individual song and admirably clearly enunciates the stories through the lyrics. As each track is an unfolding story, they too have their own identity within the musicianship accompanying Morris." adding "Showcasing the spirit and history of our country, this is yet another of Morris’s projects to go out and add to your collection."

Michael Dwyer of Rolling Stone Australia said; "Like its predecessor, Van Diemen’s Land is all-true Aussie histories strung up on wiry blues arrangements like so many pages cut from yellowing broadsheets. The panorama spans colonial horrors to WW2 bombers and Japanese labour camps; dramas on river and sea and character portraits from Birdsville to Kings Cross. Morris’s voice is never less than totally engaged and engaging.”

== Accolades ==
At the ARIA Music Awards of 2014, the album was nominated for ARIA Award for Best Blues and Roots Album, losing out to Flesh & Blood by John Butler Trio

== Track listing ==
Standard edition
No.	Title	Writer(s)	Length
1.	"Dexter's Big Tin Can"	Russell Morris, Mitch Cairns	3:07
2.	"Van Diemen's Land"	Morris, Shannon Bourne	4:36
3.	"Sweetest Thing" (featuring Vika and Linda Bull)	Morris, Bourne	2:59
4.	"Birdsville" (featuring Vika and Linda Bull)	Morris, Peter Robinson	3:28
5.	"Breaker Morant"	Morris, Bourne	3:46
6.	"Loch Ard Gorge"	Morris, Robinson	4:43
7.	"Burning Rodney"	Morris, Robinson	2:42
8.	"Witch of Kings X"	Morris, Garry Paige	4:47
9.	"Eureka"	Morris, Ed Nimmervoll	3:53
10.	"Sandakan"	Morris	4:06
11.	"Slide on the River"	Morris	3:37
12.	"Lucy McBride"	Morris	3:57
13.	"Bendigo Rock"	Morris	5:06

== Personnel ==
- Artwork – Ian Phillips
- Bass, Percussion, Keyboards – Mitch Cairns
- Cello - Anita Quayle
- Double Bass - Scott Owen
- Drums, Percussion – Adrian Violi, Rob Hirst
- Guitar – Shannon Bourne, Joe Robinson, Ross Hannaford, Phil Manning
- Guitar [slide] - Rick Springfield, Peter Robinson
- Mastered By – Joe Carra
- Mixed By – Michael Carpenter, Mitch Cairns
- Producer - Mitch Cairns
- Saxophone - Joe Camilleri
- Tambone - Dave Palmer

== Charts ==
=== Weekly charts ===
Chart (2014)	Peak position
Australian Albums (ARIA)	4
Australian Jazz and Blues Albums Chart (ARIA)	1

=== Year-end charts ===
Chart (2014)	Position
Australian Albums Chart	76
Australian Artist Albums Chart	26
Australian Jazz & Blues Albums Chart	2
Chart (2015)	Position
Australian Jazz & Blues Albums Chart	9
Chart (2016)	Position
Australian Jazz & Blues Albums Chart	23
Chart (2017)	Position
Australian Jazz & Blues Albums Chart	35

== Certifications ==
Region	Certification	Certified units/sales
Australia (ARIA)	Gold	35,000^{‡}
^{‡} Sales+streaming figures based on certification alone.

== Release history ==
Region	Date	Format	Edition(s)	Label	Catalogue
Australia	11 April 2014	CD; digital download	Standard	FanFare, Ambition Records	FANFARE142
Australia	30 October 2015	Vinyl	Standard	FanFare, Ambition Records	FANFARE142V
