= Bloodstone (Russell Morris album) =

Studio album by Russell Morris
- Released: September 1971
- Genre: Pop, rock
- Label: His Master's Voice, EMI Music
- Producer: Howard Gable

Russell Morris chronology
Bloodstone (1971)	Mr America (EP) (1972)

Singles from Bloodstone
- 1. "Sweet, Sweet Love" Released: July 1971

Bloodstone is the first studio album by the Australian singer-songwriter Russell Morris. It was released in September 1971 and peaked at number 12 on the Australian Go-Set chart.

The album won the Best Album award at the 1971 King of Pop Awards.

== Critical reception ==
The Australian music journalist Ian McFarlane wrote, "Bloodstone featured singer-song writer rock mixed with folk and US West Coast country-rock influences and with Morris having written every track..... It featured an all-star cast of session players from the upper echelons of the then current Aussie rock fraternity..... The front cover presented a design by artist Geoff Pendelbury, one of those impressionistic art pieces that were fashionable back in the day but seem to be too esoteric and oblique to have any real significance or impact now..... Bloodstone is somewhat more down-home and modest without losing sight of certain lofty intentions. Song titles such as 'Saints and Sinners', 'Our Hero is Dead', 'Heaven Shines', 'The Cell' and 'Ride Your Chariot' bear the brush of an earnest and serious young artist finding his way in an already established world of adult contemporary pop-rock. At least Morris was willing to take up the challenge and his efforts did result in one of the best local albums of the year..... There are some basic themes running throughout the album with the original Side One of the vinyl being the uptempo side while Side Two was the big ballad side."

The Australian said, ""Sweet, Sweet Love" dragged Bloodstone into the charts towards the end of 1971, but its tales of humanity’s lost ("O Helley", "The Gambler’s Lament") and found ("The Cell", "Heaven Shines") show how fully formed Morris's song craft was at just age 23."

== Track listing ==
Side one
No.	Title	Writer(s)	Length
1.	"O Helley"	Russell Morris
2.	"Jail Jonah's Daughter"	Russell Morris
3.	"Saints and Sinners"	Russell Morris
4.	"Our Hero is Dead"	Russell Morris
5.	"Heaven Shines"	Russell Morris

Side two
No.	Title	Writer(s)	Length
1.	"The Cell"
2.	"The Gambler's Lament"	Russell Morris
3.	"Goodbye"	Russell Morris
4.	"Ride Your Chariot"	Russell Morris
5.	"Lay in the Graveyard"	Russell Morris
6.	"Sweet, Sweet Love"	Russell Morris

== Charts ==
Bloodstone debuted at number 19, before peaking at number 12 in its third week on 25 September 1971.

Chart (1971)	Peak position
Australian Go-Set Chart	12

== Credits ==
- Guitar – Phil Manning, Rick Springfield
- Harmonica – Matt Taylor
- Piano – Brian Cadd, Warren Morgan
