= Hans Poulsen =

Australian musician (1945–2023)

- Also known as: Hans Sven Poulsen
- Born: Bruce Gordon Poulsen; 7 March 1945; Melbourne, Victoria, Australia
- Died: 17 February 2023 (aged 77)
- Genres: Soft rock; pop; folk; country; bluegrass
- Occupations: Musician; singer; composer
- Instruments: Mandolin; autoharp; bouzouki; balalaika; guitar; piano; vocals
- Years active: 1961–1993
- Labels: Go!! Records; Fable Records; EMI/Parlophone; Hans Poulsen

Hans Sven Poulsen (born Bruce Gordon Poulsen, 7 March 1945 – 17 February 2023) was an Australian singer-songwriter and musician of Danish descent who was popular in the late 1960s and early 1970s, and known for his eccentric hippie style. Poulsen had hits with "Boom Sha La La Lo" and "There's a Light Across the Valley" (both in 1970) and had success as a songwriter with "Jamie/Rose Coloured Glasses" for Johnny Farnham and "Monty and Me" for Zoot.

== Life and career ==
Poulsen was born in Melbourne, Australia on 7 March 1945. His parents, Vic and Nellie Poulsen, played two instruments, lap-steel guitar and ukulele with their styles of Hawaiian music, as well as bush ballads, country and western music and folk.

Poulsen has in error often been stated to be born in Denmark, although his descent is Danish, his paternal grandfather had migrated to Victoria, from Denmark during the early 20th century and being proud of his heritage, Poulsen took the first names of "Hans Sven" while still a teenager. It is possible that he took the name as a stage-name when he started his school band in 1961 called the Rimfires; at this time he played around the Frankston area, an outer suburb of Melbourne, and around the Mornington Peninsula region on the coast. It was here that he learnt his craft and became known for his interpretation of the music and songs of Buddy Holly.

In 1965, Poulsen formed the first version of a Melbourne group called 18th Century Quartet, which played original material (mostly by Poulsen) and performed in a style that later came to be known as world music; the group also differed from most of its contemporaries with its use of diverse acoustic instruments including mandolin, autoharp and bouzouki. The second incarnation would be a more pop orientated sound.

After embarking on a solo career in 1967, Poulsen had two Australian pop hits with the songs "Boom Sha La La Lo" (1970) and "There's a Light Across the Valley". He also had success as a songwriter with hits written for other artists, including "Rose Coloured Glasses" for John Farnham, "Lady Scorpio" for The Strangers and "Monty and Me" for Zoot, co-written with Bruce Woodley (The Seekers). One of his best-known and most successful compositions, "It's Only a Matter of Time", was the much-played B-side of the single "The Real Thing" by Russell Morris, which was an Australian No. 1 hit in May 1969.

In 1972, Poulsen relocated to the Findhorn Foundation spiritual community in north east Scotland, where he recorded three albums, What a Way to Look at Life: Findhorn Foundation Sing-Along, It Can't Be Described in Words and Universal Hands (all 1975, all released on cassette only by the Findhorn Foundation). These featured many of Poulsen's own songs, plus some by other community singers. Short clips of Poulsen performing several songs are included in the documentary Findhorn, produced in 1974 and reissued on DVD by Earthworks Films in 2006. Poulsen left Findhorn in 1976. Poulsen's career was cut short in the late 1970s when he suffered first cancer and then a stroke, and spent several years in hospital. On his recovery he went on to become a music therapist.

Poulsen died on 17 February 2023, at the age of 77.

== Publication ==
A booklet, Hans Poulsen – Troubadour, was written by Australian music journalist Paul McHenry and published by Moonlight Publications in 1996.

== Discography ==
=== Albums ===
Title	Album details
Natural High	Released: 1971; Label: Fable (FBSA 004)
Getting Back to Nothing (with Bruce Woodley, Billy Green)	Released: 1971; Label: Fable (FBSA 005); Note: Soundtrack to the film Getting Back to Nothing
Lost and Found	Released: 1972; Label: Fable (FBSA 014)
Sacred Games	Released: 1989; Label: Hans Poulsen
Carry You in My Heart	Released: 1993; Label: Hans Poulsen
Wonderchild's in Town	Released: 1997; Label: Hans Poulsen
Franco & Silverina	Released: 2001; Label: Hans Poulsen
Rock N' Roll Mystics	Released: 2002; Label: Hans Poulsen
The Best of the Early Years 1964-72	Released: 2002; Label: Hans Poulsen; Compilation album

=== Extended plays ===
Title	EP details
Boom Sha La La Lo	Released: 1973; Label: Fable (FBEP-161)

=== Singles ===
List of singles, with selected chart positions
Year	Title	Peak chart positions
Year	Title	AUS
1968	"Coming Home Late Again"	—
1970	"Boom-Sha-La-La-Lo"	5
1970	"There's a Light Across the Valley"	39
1971	"Stick of Incense"	—
1971	"Sweetest Girl I've Ever Seen (Is Always Crying)"	—
1971	"Stork's Song"	—
1972	"Meet Me in the Valley"	—
1972	"Sleepy Town Girls"/"The Wanderer's Song"	—

== Awards and nominations ==
=== Go-Set Pop Poll ===
The Go-Set Pop Poll was coordinated by teen-oriented pop music newspaper, Go-Set and was established in February 1966 and conducted an annual poll during 1966 to 1972 of its readers to determine the most popular personalities.

Year	Nominee / work	Award	Result
1970	himself	Best Composer	3rd
1971	himself	Best Male Vocal	5th
1971	himself	Best Songwriter / Composer	3rd
1971	Best Album	Natural High	2rd

== See also ==
- GTK (TV series))
