= Raymond Froggatt =

English singer-songwriter (1941–2023)

- Born: 13 November 1941; Bordesley Green, Birmingham, England
- Died: 23 July 2023 (aged 81); Shrewsbury, Shropshire, England

Raymond William Froggatt (13 November 1941 – 23 July 2023) was an English songwriter and singer.

== Biography ==
Froggatt (otherwise known as "Froggy") was born in Bordesley Green, Birmingham on 13 November 1941. He began performing rock and roll in the early 1960s before moving on to focus on Country and Western. His band, initially known as the Buccaneers, later Monopoly and ultimately The Raymond Froggatt Band with guitarist Hartley Cain (H Cain), drummer Len Ablethorpe and whose bassist was Louis Clark of Electric Light Orchestra and Hooked on Classics fame, were signed by Polydor in 1964. However chart success eluded them, although the Dave Clark Five had a No. 7 hit in the UK Singles Chart with Froggatt's "The Red Balloon" in 1968. His own original version of the song, under the title "Callow-la-vita", reached No. 3 in the Netherlands.

Another Froggatt song, "Big Ship", was a No. 8 UK Singles Chart hit for Cliff Richard in 1969, and in the same year Froggatt's composition "Rachel" became a popular song in Australia and New Zealand, when it was released by the Australian artist Russell Morris.

In the 1970s, the band was managed by Don Arden, hoping to break into the United States music scene, but the experience led to the collapse of the band.

Froggatt later became an internationally recognised country music performer, releasing Here's to Everyone (1993) on his Red Balloon record label. Froggatt's autobiography, Raymond Who, followed in 1995.

Froggatt's wife, Louise, died in a car crash. Raymond Froggatt died at Royal Shrewsbury Hospital on 23 July 2023, at the age of 81.

== Discography ==
- 1969 – The Voice And Writings of Raymond Froggatt
- 1972 – Bleach
- 1974 – Rogues And Thieves
- 1978 – Southern Fried Frog
- 1979 – Songs From A Minstral
- 1980 – Stay With Me
- 1982 – Sooner Or Later
- 1984 – Why?
- 1988 – Is It Rollin' Bob
- 1991 – Here's To Everyone
- 1993 – At The London Palladium
- 1995 – Someday
- 1996 – The Collection
- 1997 – Moonshine
- 1980 – Runaway
- 1998 – Southern Fried Frog & Rogues And Thieves
- 1998 – In Concert at the Birmingham Town Hall
- 1998 – There Goes That Song Again
- 1999 – Now And Then
- 2002 – Milestones
- 2003 – Cold As A Landlord's Heart
- 2003 – Coast To Coast
- 2003 – Shantytown
- 2004 – The Voice And Writing of Raymond Froggatt
- 2004 – Songland 40
- 2004 – Adaos
- 2004 – Just One Night in Concert Symphony Hall Birmingham
- 2006 – Dream of You
- 2007 – Songwriter
- 2007 – The Lights of Amsterdam
- 2010 – Songs With Reasons
- 2010 – Warm Days Summer Nights
- 2011 – Blue And Gold
- 2011 – America
- 2011 – Fields of Rock And Roll
- 2012 – Movin' On
- 2013 – Birmingham Rain
- 2014 – Closer To You
- 2015 – The Classic Collection Vol 2
- 2018 – In Concert (Hunstanton & Birmingham)
