= Russell Morris =

Australian singer-songwriter (born 1948)

Russell Morris AM
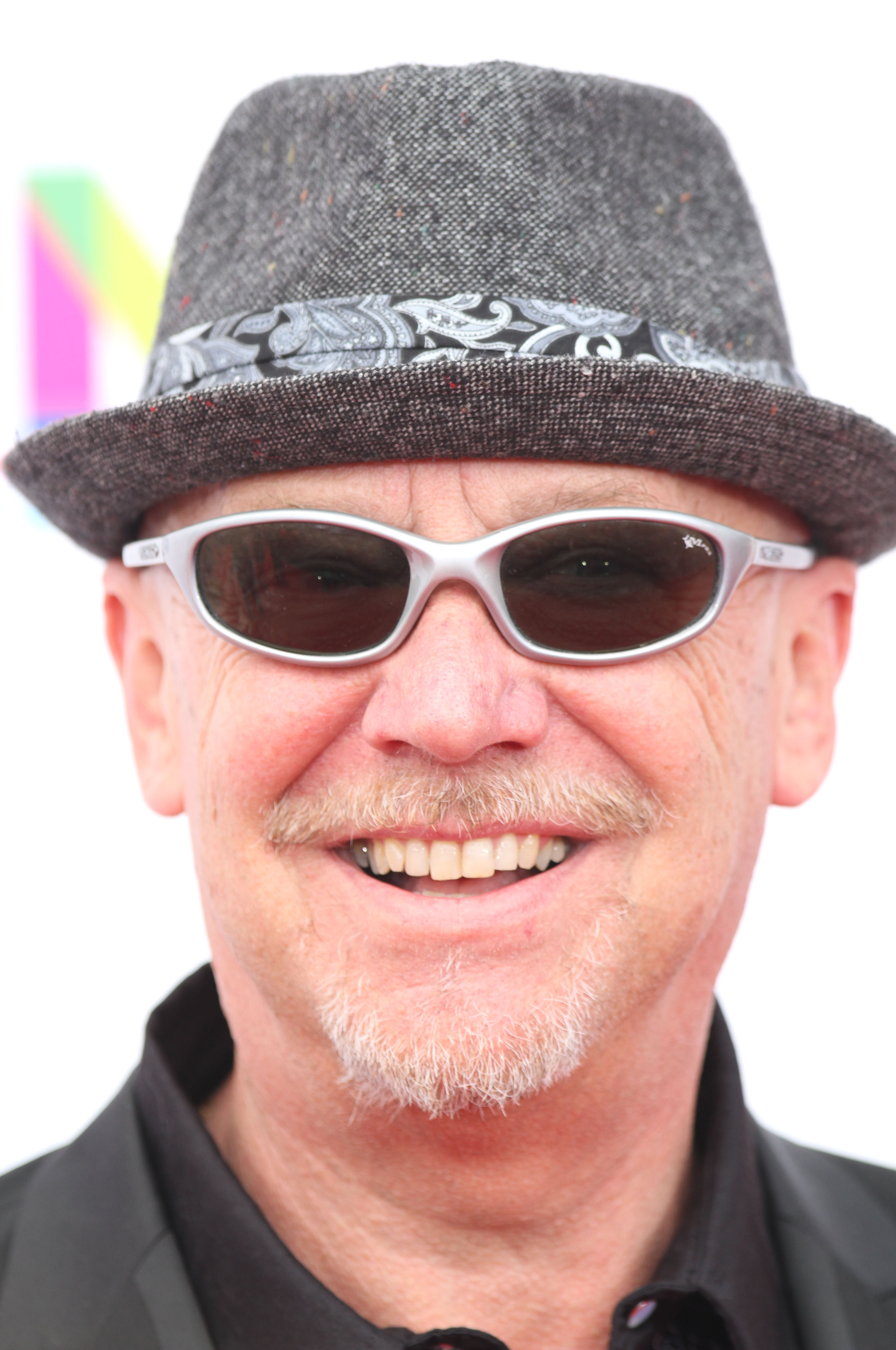
- Morris at the 2014 ARIA Music Awards; Sydney, 26 November 2014

Background information
- Born: Russell Norman Morris; 31 July 1948 (age 78); Richmond, Victoria, Australia
- Genre: Rock
- Occupations: Musician; singer; songwriter; guitarist; bassist
- Instruments: Vocals, guitar
- Years active: 1966–present
- Labels: EMI; Wizard; Festival Records; Mushroom Records
- Formerly of: Somebody's Image; Russell Morris Band; Russell Morris & the Rubes; Burns Cotton & Morris; Cotton Keays & Morris; The Morris Springfield Project
- Website: russellmorris.com.au

Russell Norman Morris AM (born 31 July 1948) is an Australian singer-songwriter and guitarist who had five Australian Top 10 singles during the late 1960s and early 1970s. On 1 July 2008, the Australian Recording Industry Association (ARIA) recognised Morris's status when he was inducted into the ARIA Hall of Fame.

"The Real Thing" was added to the National Film and Sound Archive's Sounds of Australia registry in 2013.

== Career ==
=== 1966–1968: Beginnings and Somebody's Image ===
Morris's career started in September 1966, when he was 18 years old, with the formation of the Melbourne group Somebody's Image with Morris as the lead singer together with Kevin Thomas (rhythm guitar), Phillip Raphael (lead guitar), Eric Cairns (drums) and Les Allan (also known as "Les Gough") (bass guitar). Somebody's Image quickly developed a strong following at Melbourne's premier venues. It was not long before the band came to the notice of Go-Set staff writer Ian Meldrum and the group had a local hit version of the Joe South song "Hush", which peaked at number 15 on the national chart. The song reached No. 2 on the local Melbourne charts.

Meldrum's support and hard work promoting the band helped them to secure a firmer recording deal with EMI Records. The result was their third single, "Hide And Seek", which peaked at No. 32 in Melbourne. It was their last release with Morris who left Somebody's Image in September 1968.

=== 1969–1971: Solo career and "The Real Thing" ===
Morris's debut solo single was a near seven-minute production extravaganza around a song called "The Real Thing", released in March 1969. "The Real Thing" was written by Johnny Young, produced by Molly Meldrum and engineered by John L Sayers. The backing track was performed by members of Melbourne soul band the Groop, which included Brian Cadd, Richard Wright (drums) and Don Mudie (bass) as well as Zoot guitarist Roger Hicks (who composed and performed the acoustic guitar hook) and backing vocalists Ronnie Charles (The Groop), the Chiffons (including Maureen Elkner) and Marcie and The Cookies' Sue Brady and Judy Condon.

"The Real Thing" is one of the classic psychedelic singles of the 1960s. The release unsettled radio programmers, who had never been asked to play such a long Australian single before. A shortened version, which omitted the extended coda, was often played instead. At around six minutes and thirty seconds, it was the longest pop single recorded in Australia at that time (although the Beatles' "Hey Jude" at nearly seven minutes had appeared the year before). The single reached Australia's No. 1 spot in June 1969. It was also No. 1 in Chicago, Houston and New York City despite international distribution difficulties. It was the biggest selling Australian single of 1969.

The song was followed by "Part Three into Paper Walls" released in July 1969. The track was co-written by Johnny Young and Morris and arranged by John Farrar. The single received extensive airplay making it a double number one recording, the first time an Australian artist had scored consecutive number ones with their first two singles. Many radio stations also began flipping the single over and playing the lush B-side ballad "The Girl That I Love", thereby lengthening the single's shelf life—and revealing to radio listeners another facet of Russell's singing talents. "Morris Mania" was in full swing, with a demanding schedule of live appearances and the continued support from Uptight and Go-Set.

Morris travelled to the United Kingdom to help promote "The Real Thing", but the song did not perform well. He returned to Australia in December 1969 and performed a concert in Brisbane which was attended by 5,000 people, of which more than 100 were taken away by ambulance due to "advanced hysteria". Morris began recording new tracks with Howard Gable. He recorded English songwriter Raymond Froggatt's "Rachel" which peaked at No. 23 in May 1970. The song became a big hit in New Zealand, where it reached No. 1 in July 1970. "Mr America" followed, which was a riff-heavy, gospel-flavoured number with a soaring female choral backing. Coupled with the equally strong self-penned B-side, "Stand Together", the single returned Morris to the charts, hitting the national Top 10 in January 1971. "Mr America" also won Morris the TV Week's Music Awards accolade for Composer of the Year.

=== 1971–1973: Bloodstone and Wings of an Eagle and Other Great Hits ===
Morris concentrated on his own songwriting and with the cream of Australian musicians including Brian Cadd, Rick Springfield, Beeb Birtles and Marcie Jones, spent almost a year painstakingly recording and re-recording what became the Bloodstone album. The album was recorded at Channel 9's TCS Studios and produced by Howard Gable. "Sweet, Sweet Love", backed with the funky, Band-ish album cut "Jail Jonah's Daughter" was released in June and peaked at No. 7 in July 1971, while the album made the national Top 20, peaking at No. 12 soon after its release in September and earning great praise from critics as well. "Live with Friends" and "Wings of an Eagle" were also released peaking within the top 20. In March 1973, EMI Records released the first hits compilation called, Wings of an Eagle and Other Great Hits which peaked at number 12 in Australia.

=== 1973–1977: New York and Russell Morris and Turn it On ===
In 1973, Morris moved to London to record an album, only to discover there was no record contract waiting for him. He relocated to New York City and worked on an album there. He released Russell Morris in 1975 on Robie Porter's Wizard label in Australia and on RCA for US release. "Let's Do It" / "Don't Rock the Boat" peaked at number 30 in Australia. A second American album was released in 1976, called Turn it On. It was two more years before Morris was granted his green card, enabling him to tour America. But by then, any chance of an American career had remained unfulfilled. Instead, Morris returned to Australia

=== 1978–1996: Australia, Russell Morris bands and A Thousand Suns ===
Once Morris had returned to Australia, he formed the Russell Morris Band. The band signed with Mushroom Records and commenced live performances, writing songs designed to be played live rather than chasing radio airplay, but scoring a couple of minor hits on the way. Eventually, the band played and recorded as Russell Morris & the Rubes.

The Rubes achieved critical acclaim but mainstream radio refused to play their tracks. By 1983 the five Rubes made a decision, if their single "Get It Right", which they rated highly, was not picked up by radio, they would call it quits, which they did.

Morris also fronted the Lonely Boys throughout the 1980s and branched out onto the musical stage, appearing as "Riff Raff" in a Melbourne production of The Rocky Horror Show and a few years later taking on the role of Simon Zealotes in the 1992 arena production of Jesus Christ Superstar alongside John Farnham, Kate Ceberano, Angry Anderson and Jon Stevens. In November 1991, Morris released another solo album, A Thousand Suns, which peaked at number 98.

=== 1996–2006: Bands with Ronnie Burns, Darryl Cotton and Jim Keays ===
In 1996, Morris joined fellow 1960s singers Ronnie Burns and Darryl Cotton and began touring under the name Burns Cotton & Morris. The group released three albums. In 2000, Jim Keays replaced Burns and the group called themselves Cotton Keays & Morris. They released five albums over the next 5 years. The trio toured until Darryl Cotton's death in 2012.

Also in 2000, Morris's "The Real Thing" and "Wings of an Eagle" featured prominently in the Australian-made movie The Dish, and Midnight Oil released a cover version of "The Real Thing" as a single and as the title track of their live acoustic album The Real Thing. At the Gimme Ted benefit concert on 9 March 2001 Morris performed two songs. In 2002 he took a place of honour among his peers as part of the hugely successful Long Way to the Top concert tour. Rouseabout Records released the definitive 2CD Russell Morris anthology, called The Real Thing, covering his entire career.

=== 2007–2011: Fundamentalist, Brian Cadd and ARIA Hall of Fame ===
In May 2007, Morris recorded Fundamentalist an acoustic album of his earlier hits. The album was released on Liberation Blue and as of September 2013, has sold around 8,000 copies.

In 2007, Morris teamed up with longtime friend Brian Cadd and released a live album titled Live at the Con. The duo performed irregularly for the next three years and released a studio album in 2011 titled Wild Bulls and Horses.

On 1 July 2008, Morris was inducted into the ARIA Hall of Fame. He was joined on-stage by guest musicians Steve Kilbey, Tim Powles, Jak Housden, Clayton Doley and Lachlan Doley to perform "The Real Thing". According to Andrew Murfett of The Age, "Russell Morris, whose classic "The Real Thing" was performed with a supergroup comprising members of The Church, The Whitlams and Powderfinger, was inducted with a tribute from Midnight Oil drummer Rob Hirst. Morris proved to be a revelation on the night, stirring the crowd with a terrific performance."

In October 2010, Morris's 1973 album, Wings of an Eagle and Other Great Hits, was listed in the book 100 Best Australian Albums.

=== 2012–2018: Blues trilogy: Sharkmouth, Van Diemen's Land and Red Dirt – Red Heart ===
In October 2012 Morris released the first of his trilogy of Australian story albums. Sharkmouth is a collection of tracks about the Australian of the 1920s and 30s and includes songs about Phar Lap, Les Darcy and The Great Depression. The album features appearances by Mark Lizotte, Troy Cassar-Daley and Renee Geyer. The album reached No. 6 on the ARIA charts and was certified platinum.

In April 2014, Morris released Van Diemen's Land which focused on larger events rather than individuals, from the prison ships that began Australia as a penal settlement to the union strikes, the First and Second World Wars as well as paddle steamers on the Murray River. Van Diemen's Land was nominated for Best Blues and Roots at the 2014 ARIA Awards, certified Gold sales and was the highest-charting album of Russell's 50-year career to date debuting at No.4 on the overall ARIA Charts.

In 2015, Morris released Red Dirt – Red Heart, the third and final album in the trilogy. Red Dirt – Red Heart is about the Australian Interior. Stories of two bushrangers, a song about a beautiful town, a song about a loner, a recluse, and an escape artist, a snake and the Nullarbor Plain. The album peaked at number 21 on the ARIA Charts. At the ARIA Music Awards of 2016, Red Dirt – Red Heart won ARIA Award for Best Blues and Roots Album.

=== 2019–present: Black and Blue Heart and the Morris Springfield Project ===
In February 2019, Morris confirmed the release of his next studio album Black and Blue Heart on 5 April 2019. The album, produced by Powderfinger's Bernard Fanning and Nick DiDia, has been described as a rock album.

In 2021, Morris joined Rick Springfield and formed The Morris Springfield Project. The Morris Springfield Project released Jack Chrome and the Darkness Waltz in October 2021 which debuted at number 34 on the ARIA Charts.

== Discography ==
=== Studio albums ===
- Bloodstone (1971)
- Russell Morris (1975)
- Turn it On (1976)
- Foot in the Door as the Russell Morris Band (1979)
- Almost Frantic as Russell Morris & the Rubes (1981)
- A Thousand Suns (1991)
- Off the Shelf (2002)
- Fundamentalist (2007)
- Jumpstart Diary (2008)
- Wild Bulls and Horses with Brian Cadd (2011)
- Sharkmouth (2012)
- Van Diemen's Land (2014)
- Red Dirt – Red Heart (2015)
- Black and Blue Heart (2019)
- The Dreams of Jack Chrome (2022)

=== See also ===
- Somebody's Image
- Burns Cotton & Morris
- Cotton Keays & Morris
- The Morris Springfield Project

== Awards and nominations ==
=== AIR Awards ===
The Australian Independent Record Awards (commonly known informally as AIR Awards) is an annual awards night to recognise, promote and celebrate the success of Australia's Independent Music sector. The commenced in 2006.

Year	Nominee / work	Award	Result	Ref.
2017	Red Dirt – Red Heart	Best Independent Blues and Roots Album	Nominated	
2024	The Real Thing: Symphonic Concert	Best Independent Classical Album or EP	Nominated	

=== APRA Awards ===
The APRA Awards are presented annually from 1982 by the Australasian Performing Right Association (APRA), "honouring composers and songwriters". They commenced in 1982.

Year	Nominee / work	Award	Result	Ref.
2013	"Black Blues Dog" (James Keays & Russell Morris)	Blues & Roots Work of the Year	Nominated	
2015	"Van Diemens Land" (Shannon Bourne & Russell Morris)	Song of the Year	Shortlisted	

=== ARIA Music Awards ===
The ARIA Music Awards is an annual awards ceremony that recognises excellence, innovation, and achievement across all genres of Australian music. They commenced in 1987

Year	Nominee / work	Award	Result
2008	himself	ARIA Hall of Fame	inductee
2013	Sharkmouth	Best Blues and Roots Album	Won
2014	Van Diemens Land	Best Blues and Roots Album	Nominated
2016	Red Dirt – Red Heart	Best Blues and Roots Album	Won

=== Australian Songwriter's Hall of Fame ===
The Australian Songwriters Hall of Fame was established in 2004 to honour the lifetime achievements of some of Australia's greatest songwriters.

Year	Nominee / work	Award	Result
2005	himself	Australian Songwriter's Hall of Fame	inducted

=== Go-Set Pop Poll ===
The Go-Set Pop Poll was coordinated by teen-oriented pop music newspaper, Go-Set and was established in February 1966 and conducted an annual poll during 1966 to 1972 of its readers to determine the most popular personalities.

Year	Nominee / work	Award	Result
1969	himself	Male Vocal	1st
1970	himself	Male Vocal	2nd
1970	himself	Composer	4th
1971	himself	Male Vocal	2nd
1971	himself	Composer / Song Writer	1st
1971	"Mr. America"	Best Single	4th
1972	himself	Male Vocal	2nd
1972	himself	Composer / Song Writer	3rd
1972	Bloodstone	Best Album	4th

=== King and Queen of Pop Awards ===
The King and Queen of Pop Awards were voted by the readers of TV Week. The King of Pop award started in 1967 and ran through to 1978.

Year	Nominee / work	Award	Result
1971	Bloodstone	Best Album	Won
1971	himself for "Mr America"	Composer / Song Writer	Won

=== Mo Awards ===
The Australian Entertainment Mo Awards, commonly known informally as the Mo Awards, were annual Australian entertainment industry awards. They recognised achievements in live entertainment in Australia from 1975 to 2016. Morris won an award in 2011.

Year	Nominee / work	Award	Result (wins only)
2011	Russell Morris	Hall of Fame	inductee

=== Music Victoria Awards ===
The Music Victoria Awards are an annual awards night celebrating Victorian music. They commenced in 2006.

Year	Nominee / work	Award	Result
2013	Sharkmouth	Best Blues Albums	Nominated

=== Tamworth Songwriters Association ===
The Tamworth Songwriters Association holds an annual songwriting contest for original country songs in January at the Tamworth Country Music Festival. They commenced in 1986. Morris won an award in 1992.

Year	Nominee / work	Award	Result (wins only)
1992	"Out of the Blue" by Russell Morris	Contemporary Song of the Year	Won

== Sources ==
- Encyclopedia of Australian Rock and Pop by Ian McFarlane (Allen & Unwin, Sydney, 1999, ISBN 1-86508-072-1)
- Australian Encyclopedia of Rock & Pop by Noel McGrath (Rigby Publishers, 1978)
- The Who's Who of Australian Rock by Chris Spencer (Moonlight Publishing, 1993)
