= Rachel (song) =

Single by Russell Morris
- B-side: "Slow Joey"
- Released: April 1970
- Recorded: Armstrong Studios, Melbourne
- Genre: Pop rock
- Length: 4:27
- Label: EMI/Columbia (Australia), Decca Records (United Kingdom)
- Songwriter: Raymond Froggatt
- Producer: Howard Gable

Russell Morris singles chronology
"Part Three into Paper Walls" (1969)	"Rachel" (1970)	"Mr America" (1970)

"Rachel" is a song by Australian singer Russell Morris. The song was written by English singer-songwriter Raymond Froggatt and produced by Howard Gable.

It was released as a single in April 1970 and peaked at number 23 on the Australian Go-Set chart in May 1970. The track peaked at number 1 in New Zealand.

Composer Froggatt did not release the song himself until 1972 on a Bell UK single.

== Background and recording ==
In 1969, Morris travelled to London to promote his track "The Real Thing" with UK label Decca Records. The song was a commercial failure and failed to chart. Whilst there, Russell recorded two numbers with expatriate Aussie guitarist and former Bee Gee Vince Melouney, one being Melouney’s "Little Lady", the other "Rachel". These cuts remain unreleased, the perfectionist singer being very unhappy with the producer's mix.

Morris returned to Melbourne in December 1969 and immediately set about fresh recording sessions with EMI and re-recorded "Rachel". It was released as a single in April 1970, peaking at number 23. The single's fate was in part determined, as that of many other single releases at the time, by the controversial 1970 radio ban which resulted in major United Kingdom and Australian pop songs being refused airplay, including Morris' EMI.

== Dave Justin version ==
The original release of "Rachel" was in November 1968 by British singer Dave Justin on an unsuccessful Polydor UK single. This was some 17 months before Russell Morris's release.

== Track listing (Russell Morris) ==
7" Single

- Side A "Rachel" - 4:27
- Side B "Slow Joey" - 2:26

== Charts ==
=== Weekly charts ===
Chart (1970)	Peak position
Australian Go-Set Chart	23
New Zealand (Recorded Music NZ)	1

=== Year-end charts ===
Chart (1970)	Position
Australian Go-Set Chart	86
Australian Artist Go-Set Chart	13

== See also ==
- List of number-one singles in 1970 (New Zealand)
