= Somebody's Image =

Australian band (1966–1969)

- Origin: Melbourne, Victoria, Australia
- Genres: Pop rock, rock, R&B
- Years active: 1966–1969
- Labels: In/W&G, EMI
- Past members: Les Allan a.k.a. Les Gough; Eric Cairns; Russell Morris; Phillip Raphael; Kevin Thomas; Ronnie Charles; Brian Holloway

Somebody's Image were an Australian pop and R&B band formed in 1966, which included Russell Morris on lead vocals. Their highest charting single is a cover version of Joe South's "Hush", which peaked at number 14 on the Go-Set National Top 40. Morris left in 1968 to start his solo career and the group disbanded in the following year.

== History ==
Somebody's Image formed in Melbourne in 1966 as a pop and R&B band by Les Allan a.k.a. Les Gough on bass guitar, Eric Cairns on drums, Russell Morris on lead vocals, Phillip Raphael on lead guitar and Kevin Thomas on rhythm guitar. The fledgling band were hanging around gigs by the Groop, who were a favourite of Melbourne pop fans during that year. They played their first live gig supporting the Groop with keyboardist Brian Cadd and lead singer Ronnie Charles. Somebody's Image developed a following at Melbourne's venues and were noticed by Go-Set staff writer Ian "Molly" Meldrum, who had championed the Groop relentlessly in his columns. Meldrum took over as their talent manager. Charles would occasionally provide vocals for the new group.

Somebody's Image began their recording career with the single "Heat Wave" (September 1967) a cover version of Martha and the Vandellas' song, but it failed to chart. Their second single was their rendition of Joe South's "Hush" which peaked at No. 14 on Go-Set National Top 40. Both these singles were produced by Meldrum for W&G Records' label In Records. With Meldrum's support they secured a recording deal with EMI Records. The band issued their third single, "Hide and Seek" in April 1968, which peaked at number No. 32. Australian musicologist Ian McFarlane declared "despite its moderate chart placing, it was the band's best release." In September 1968 Morris left the band to pursue a solo career with Meldrum as his manager. The rest of the group recruited new singer, guitarist Brian Holloway (ex-the Dream), but Somebody's Image disbanded in 1969.

== Members ==
- Les Allan a.k.a. Les Gough – bass guitar
- Eric Cairns – drums
- Russell Morris – lead vocals
- Phillip Raphael – guitar
- Kevin Thomas – guitar
- Ronnie Charles – occasional vocals
- Brian Holloway – lead vocals, guitar

== Discography ==
=== Singles ===
- "Heat Wave" (1967)
- "Hush" (1967) AUS Go-Set: No. 14
- "Hide and Seek" (1968) Australia No. 32

== Awards and nominations ==
=== Go-Set Pop Poll ===
The Go-Set Pop Poll was coordinated by teen-oriented pop music newspaper, Go-Set and was established in February 1966 and conducted an annual poll during 1966 to 1972 of its readers to determine the most popular personalities.

| Year | Nominee / work | Award | Result |
|---|---|---|---|
| 1968 | themselves | Best Australian Group | 4th |
