= Part Three into Paper Walls =

Single by Russell Morris
- B-side: "The Girl That I Love"
- Released: July 1969
- Studio: Armstrong Studios, Melbourne
- Genre: Psychedelic rock, pop rock
- Length: 7:00
- Label: EMI/Columbia
- Songwriters: Johnny Young; Russell Morris
- Producer: Ian "Molly" Meldrum

Russell Morris singles chronology
"The Real Thing" (1969)	"Part Three into Paper Walls" (1969)	"Rachel" (1970)

"Part Three into Paper Walls" is a song by Australian pop singer Russell Morris. It was co-written by Morris and Johnny Young and produced by Ian "Molly" Meldrum. It was released as a double A-sided single, with "The Girl That I Love", in July 1969 and peaked at number one on the Australian Go-Set chart for four weeks. Morris became the first Australian artist to achieve consecutive number-ones with their first two singles. The single was certified Gold in Australia and was the 12th highest selling single of 1969.

== Background ==
Russell Morris had released his debut solo single, "The Real Thing" in March 1969. It was written as "The Real Thing – Parts 1 and 2" by Johnny Young and the recording was produced by Ian "Molly" Meldrum. The single peaked at number one on the Go-Set National Top 40.

To write the follow-up single, "Part Three into Paper Walls"/"The Girl That I Love", Morris again worked with Young. They co-wrote the first track and Young wrote the second track. Meldrum also produced this single, which appeared in July. According to Australian music journalist, Ed Nimmervoll, "Part Three into Paper Walls" was "The Real Thing" revisited, while "The Girl That I Love" was a pop ballad, which Young had offered to Morris before he had recorded "Real Thing". The single reached number one on 18 October 1969 and remained in the top spot for four weeks.

== Track listing ==
7" Single

- Side A "Part Three into Paper Walls" (Johnny Young, Russell Morris) – 7:00
- Side B "The Girl that I Love" (Young) – 4:36

== Charts ==
=== Weekly charts ===
Chart (1969)	Position
Australian Go-Set Chart	1

=== Year-end charts ===
Chart (1969)	Position
Australian Go-Set Chart	12

== See also ==
- List of Top 25 singles for 1969 in Australia
