= Mr America (song) =

Single by Russell Morris
- B-side: "Stand Together"
- Released: December 1970
- Genre: Pop rock
- Length: 3:43
- Label: EMI/Columbia (Australia)
- Songwriter: Russell Morris
- Producer: Howard Gable

Russell Morris singles chronology
"Rachel" (1970)	"Mr America" (1970)	"Sweet, Sweet Love" (1971)

"Mr America" is a song written and recorded by Australian singer Russell Morris and produced by Howard Gable. It was released as a single in December 1970 and peaked at number 8 on the Australian Go-Set chart on 6 February 1971; thus becoming Morris' third top-ten single.

"Mr America" also won Morris the 1971 TV Week's Music Awards accolade for Composer of the Year. The song came third in Best Single behind "Eleanor Rigby" by Zoot and "Eagle Rock" by Daddy Cool.

== Track listing ==
7" Single

- Side A "Mr. America" - 3:43
- Side B "Stand Together" - 4:04

== Charts ==
"Mr America" peaking at number 9 in its seventh week on the chart, on 6 February 1971.

Chart (1970/71)	Peak position
Australian Go-Set Chart	9
New Zealand (Listener)	8
