= Wings of an Eagle =

Single by Russell Morris

from the album Wings of an Eagle and Other Great Hits
- B-side: "Satisfy You"
- Released: November 1972
- Studio: Channel 9's TCS Studios
- Genre: Pop rock
- Length: 3:51
- Label: His Master's Voice (Australia)
- Songwriter: Russell Morris
- Producer: Peter Dawkins

Russell Morris singles chronology
"Live with Friends" (1972)	"Wings of an Eagle" (1972)	"Let's Do It" (1975)

"Wings of an Eagle" (or "The Wings of an Eagle") is a song written and recorded by Australian singer Russell Morris, produced by Peter Dawkins. It was released in November 1972 and peaked at number 9 on the Australian Go-Set chart in January 1973, becoming Morris's sixth top-twenty single. It was Morris's final release on the His Master's Voice label, before signing with Wizard Records.

Australian music journalist Ian McFarlane called the song "brilliant".

The song was inspired by Morris's love for ancient mythology, and how First Australians, Native Americans and early Romans believed an eagle took the spirits of the dead to the heavens.

== Track listing ==
7" Single

- Side A "Wings of an Eagle" - 3:51
- Side B "Satisfy You" - 2:16

== Charts ==
=== Weekly charts ===
Chart (1972/73)	Peak position
Australian Artist Go-Set Chart	9
New Zealand (Listener)	14

=== Year-end charts ===
Chart (1973)	Peak position
Australian Artist Go-Set Chart	15
