= Sweet, Sweet Love =

Single by Russell Morris

from the album Bloodstone
- B-side: "Jail Jonah's Daughter"
- Released: June 1971
- Recorded: Channel 9's TCS Studios
- Genre: Pop rock
- Length: 4:19
- Label: His Master's Voice (Australia); Columbia Records (New Zealand)
- Songwriter(s): Russell Morris
- Producer(s): Howard Gable

Russell Morris singles chronology
"Mr America" (1970)	"Sweet, Sweet Love" (1971)	"Live with Friends" (1972)

"Sweet, Sweet Love" is a song written and recorded by Australian singer Russell Morris and produced by Howard Gable. It was released as the lead single from his debut album Bloodstone. It peaked at number 7 on the Australian Go-Set chart in July 1971; this becoming Morris' fourth top ten single.

In a performance of the song in 2007, Morris said he originally wrote the song for John Farnham who turned the song down saying 'it takes too long to get to the chorus'.

"Sweet Sweet Love" is made up of two songs, inspired by a photo of his then-wife which he stuck up on the wall in bedsit in London while trying for UK success.

== Music and review ==
The song is set in the key of Dm

Australian music journalist Ian McFarlane said; ""Sweet, Sweet Love" is just a great pop ballad with a terrific arrangement. It starts out in a gentle, minor key way and then about halfway through the pay off comes when Morris changes key, ups the tempo and the whole thing just takes off – as good a pop song as any in 1971."

== Track listing ==
7" Single

- Side A "Sweet, Sweet Love" - 4:19
- Side B "Jail Jonah's Daughter" - 2:56

== Charts ==
"Sweet, Sweet Love" was released in June 1971, before peaking at number 9 for the week commencing 14 August 1971.

=== Weekly charts ===
Chart (1971)	Peak position
Australian Artist Go-Set Chart	9
Australia (Kent Music Report)	7
New Zealand (Listener)	5

=== Year-end charts ===
Chart (1971)	Position
Australian Go-Set Chart	33
Australian Artist Go-Set Chart	9
Australia (Kent Music Report)	41
