= Howard Gable =

New Zealand-born Australian record producer

Howard Gable is a New Zealand-born Australian record producer who is best known for his work as an A&R manager and house producer for EMI's Columbia pop label in Australia in the late 1960s and early 1970. He was also for some years married to New Zealand born pop/country singer and former Australian 'Queen of Pop' Allison Durbin.

Gable began his career with EMI's His Master's Voice label in New Zealand before relocating to Australia ca. 1968. He worked with Durbin from the late 1960s to the mid-1970s and produced most of her successful recordings of the early 1970s. He is best known for his work with John Farnham, producing five studio albums with the Australian singer as well as the Charlie Girl soundtrack of which Farnham was the lead. Other notable productions for EMI Australia in this period include the hit singles "5:10 Man" and "Turn Up Your Radio" by The Masters Apprentices; and "I'll Be Gone", the debut single by progressive rock group Spectrum, which was a number one hit in Australia in 1970.
