= The Real Thing (Russell Morris song) =

Single by Russell Morris
- Released: March 1969
- Recorded: early 1969 at Armstrong Studios, Melbourne
- Genre: Psychedelic folk; psychedelic pop
- Length: 6:20
- Label: EMI/Columbia (Australia); Decca (UK); Diamond (US)
- Songwriter: Johnny Young
- Producer: Ian "Molly" Meldrum

Russell Morris singles chronology
"The Real Thing" (1969)	"Part Three into Paper Walls" (1969)

"The Real Thing" is the debut single by Australian singer Russell Morris, released in 1969. Written by Johnny Young and produced by Ian "Molly" Meldrum, it was a huge hit in Australia and has become an Australian rock classic. It also achieved success in the United States, reaching the top of the charts in Chicago, Houston and New York City.

In January 2018, as part of Triple M's "Ozzest 100", the 'most Australian' songs of all time, "The Real Thing" was ranked number 34.

== Conception and recording ==
Johnny Young wrote the song for his and one of Meldrum's friends, singer Ronnie Burns. Young originally envisaged it as a slow acoustic ballad in the style of The Beatles' "Strawberry Fields Forever", but when Meldrum heard Young playing it backstage during a taping of the TV pop show Uptight, he was determined to secure the song for Morris, reportedly going to Young's home that night with a tape recorder and refusing to leave until Young had taped a demo version of the song for him.

In collaboration with studio engineer John Sayers, Meldrum radically transformed "The Real Thing" from Young's original vision of a simple acoustic ballad into a heavily produced studio masterpiece, extending it to an unheard-of six minutes and forty seconds in length and overdubbing the basic track with many additional instruments, vocals and sound effects. According to Sayers, the song's innovative arrangement and production developed fortuitously during the recording of the backing track at Armstrong's Studios. The track used the services of The Groop as backing band, with vocal contributions from Danny Robinson (Wild Cherries), The Chiffons, Maureen Elkner, Sue Brady and Judy Condon. Guitarist Roger Hicks from Zoot composed and played the song's distinctive acoustic guitar intro, and Billy Green (now known as Wil Greenstreet) played electric lead guitar and sitar.

"The Real Thing" was originally only intended to be the standard duration for a pop single at that time—around three minutes—but once that point had been reached in the recording session, the backing band continued to play. Impressed by what they heard, Meldrum and Sayers kept the tape rolling until the band eventually 'broke down', thereby capturing an extended ten-minute 'jam' based around the chord changes of the chorus. This inspired Sayers and Meldrum to create an entirely new arrangement; and, during additional sessions, they created an extended outro for the song by editing various sections of the studio 'jam' together and combining them with additional voices, instruments and sound effects.

The final product was a swirling psychedelic collage of music and sound effects which included deliberate edits and instrument drop-outs of the backing track (anticipating the Jamaican dub experiments of the 1970s) and an ominous spoken-word "buyer beware" message (suggestive of the LSD trip experience) which was Meldrum's heavily filtered voice reading aloud from the product disclaimer on an Ampex recording tape box. The final edit was further processed by applying the then-novel studio effect known as flanging, in which two identical copies of the recording were played together but slightly out-of-phase with each other, producing a rich 'swooshing' sound effect around the music. The children's choir singing toward the end was sourced from an archive recording of a WWII Hitler Youth choir singing "Die Jugend Marschiert" (Youth on the March) and the song concludes dramatically with the children's choir shouting "Sieg Heil!" immediately followed by the cataclysmic sound of an atomic bomb explosion.

The single is reported to have cost A$10,000, a typical budget for an entire album at the time, making it the most expensive single then recorded in Australia. "The Real Thing" became a national number-one hit for Morris in mid-1969 and is widely considered to be one of the finest Australian pop-rock recordings of the era.

"The Real Thing" was added to the National Film and Sound Archive's Sounds of Australia registry in 2013.

== Track listing ==
7" Single

1. "The Real Thing (Parts I and II)" (Johnny Young) – 6:12
2. "It's Only a Matter of Time" (Hans Poulsen) – 2:58

== Personnel ==
- Russell Morris – vocals
- Brian Cadd – Hammond organ, piano, megaphone voice track
- Richard Wright – drums
- Don Mudie – bass
- Roger Hicks – acoustic guitar
- Billy Green – electric guitar, sitar
- The Chiffons – Maureen Elkner, Sue Brady and Judy Condon
- Ian Meldrum – producer
- John L Sayers – engineer

== Charts ==
=== Weekly charts ===
Chart (1969)	Position
Australian Go-Set Chart	1
Billboard Hot 100	107

=== Year-end charts ===
Chart (1969)	Position
Australian Go-Set Chart	1

== In popular culture ==
In 1998, Australia Post issued a special-edition set of twelve stamps celebrating the early years of Australian Rock 'n' Roll, featuring Australian hit songs of the late 1950s, the 1960s and the early 1970s.

"Each of them said something about us, and told the rest of the world this is what popular culture sounds like, and it has an Australian accent."

Morris's version of "The Real Thing" was featured on the soundtrack of the 2000 Australian movie The Dish. The AFL also used a new recording of the song for its television advertisement campaign for the 2000 season, declaring Aussie Rules as "The Real Thing" as opposed to Rugby league.

In May 2001, the Australasian Performing Right Association (APRA), as part of its 75th Anniversary celebrations, named "The Real Thing" as one of the Top 30 Australian songs of all time.

Between 2004 and 2008, the song was used extensively in an advertising campaign by Western Australian Tourism Commission (Tourism WA) promoting the state both nationally and internationally.

In 2005 and 2006, while South Sydney's NRL team was sponsored by Real Insurance, this song was used as the theme song when they ran on the field.

This song was used by the Seven Network for its AFL coverage in 2007.

More recently, in 2018, Australian public television broadcaster ABC has used part of "The Real Thing" to promote its television news services.

In 2013, this song was used in Subaru BRZ, Subaru XV and Subaru Forester commercials.

== Covers ==
The Australian psychedelic/electronic/trance band Third Eye (a project of Ollie Olsen, who had previously been in Max Q with Michael Hutchence of INXS fame) released a version of the song that charted at #76 in October 1990 in Australia.

Midnight Oil covered and released a version of the song from their album The Real Thing in 2000.

Kylie Minogue released a cover in 2000 for the film Sample People.

Stoner rock band Shellfin covered "The Real Thing" on their 2015 album Cities Without Names.
