= Psychedelic rock in Australia and New Zealand =

Psychedelic rock is a notable music genre in Australia and New Zealand.

== 1960s ==
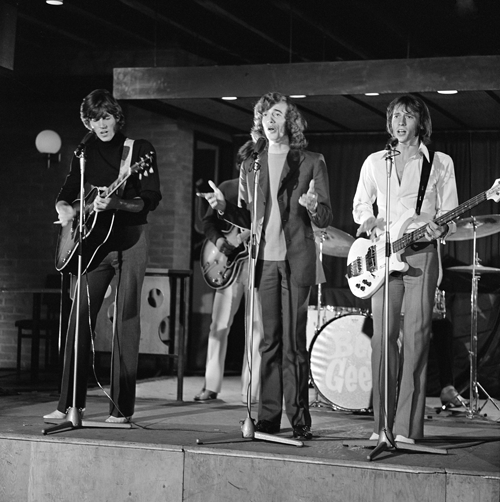
The Bee Gees, one of the most commercially successful survivors of the psychedelic era, performing on Dutch television in 1968

Although select singles gained recognition outside of the region, music from the Australian and New Zealand rock scenes formed in the wake of Beatlemania produced a large quantity of original psychedelic pop and rock music. Much of this was influenced by British psychedelia, since many bands included first-generation British and European immigrants, such as the Twilights, whose members were British immigrants.

These immigrants kept up to date on current musical developments via "care packages" of the latest singles and albums, tapes and cassettes of radio broadcasts, and the latest mod fashions, sent to them by family and friends back in the UK. After gaining local success, a number of these groups returned to the UK to further their musical careers.

The most internationally successful Australian pop-rock band of this period were the Easybeats, formed in Sydney in 1964 by a group of English, Scottish and Dutch immigrants, who scored multiple local hits in Australia before travelling to the UK. They recorded their international hit "Friday on My Mind" (1966) in London and remained there until they disbanded in 1970. A similar path was pursued by the Bee Gees, formed in Brisbane, but whose first album Bee Gees' 1st (1967), was recorded in London, and gave them three major hit singles and contained folk, rock and psychedelic elements influenced by the Beatles.

The Masters Apprentices started out as an R&B band in the style of the early Rolling Stones and Pretty Things, but they also absorbed changes in music spearheaded by the Beatles. In 1967, they released several acclaimed psychedelic singles. "Wars or Hands of Time" (the B-side of their 1966 debut single "Undecided") is generally regarded as the first Australian pop single to address the Vietnam War. Their second single "Buried and Dead" (1967), was influenced by the nascent "raga rock" genre. Their third single, the psych-pop classic "Living in a Child's Dream", became a major national hit and was voted "Single of the Year" by the readers of the Australian pop magazine Go-Set. The group also performed at one of the first psychedelic "happenings" in Australia, the "Living In A Child's Dream Ball", staged on 14 October 1967 at the University of New South Wales in Sydney. The show featured a full psychedelic light-show with liquid slide projections, smoke machines and mirror balls, and the band was wheeled onto the stage inside a specially-constructed giant die. All the groups' early singles tracks were penned by rhythm guitarist Mick Bower, who quit the music scene for health reasons soon after "Living In A Child's Dream" was released. After a period of upheaval, the band was able to continue with new members, scoring another Australian psych-pop hit in late 1967 with the Brian Cadd song "Elevator Driver".

The Twilights, formed in Adelaide, became nationwide pop stars in the mid-1960s before making the trip to London. In London, they recorded a series of minor hits and participated in the psychedelic scene before returning home in mid-1967, where they performed the entire Sgt Pepper's album live on stage some weeks before its official release in Australia. This performance was followed by the release of their psychedelic 1968 concept album Once upon a Twilight.

Although the Easybeats were the only Australian band working in the psychedelic style to score a major international hit, other Australian bands also scored local or national hits with singles that were strongly influenced by psychedelic trends. This included the cult Brisbane-based group the Wild Cherries, led by guitarist Lobby Loyde, whose 1967 single "Krome Plated Yabby"/That's Life" combined influences from R&B, soul and psychedelia, and the single's driving B-side, "That's Life" is believed to be the first Australian pop single to employ phasing in its production. The most successful New Zealand band of the period, the La De Das, produced the psychedelic pop concept album The Happy Prince (1968), based on the Oscar Wilde children's tale, but failed to break through in Britain and the wider world.

Though British influences were predominant in Australian and New Zealand bands, a number of progressive Sydney-based groups such as Tamam Shud and Tully produced music that combined influences from Eastern mystical philosophy, avant-garde jazz and American psychedelic groups such as the Grateful Dead and Jefferson Airplane. Both bands also regularly collaborated with the experimental Sydney film and light-show collective Ubu, and Tully were also notable for being the first Australian group to buy and use a Moog synthesiser, as well as performing as the house band in the original Australian stage production of Hair, which premiered in Sydney in 1969. Australian psychedelic music in the late 1960s peaked in popularity with the two singles by Melbourne singer Russell Morris. His 1969 solo debut "The Real Thing", penned by mid-Sixties pop star Johnny Young, broke new ground in Australian popular music for its lavish production by Ian Meldrum and John L Sayers and for its running time of almost seven minutes. It was reputedly the most expensive Australian single ever produced up to that time. It became a number one hit in Australia, where it charted for 23 weeks, and also went to number one on local charts in New York City, Houston, and Chicago. It was followed by "Part Three into Paper Walls", co-written by Young and Morris, which was deliberately crafted as a virtual sequel to "The Real Thing". It was also just over seven minutes long, and gave Morris his second consecutive number one hit in Australia.

== Later 20th century ==
Other Australian classic rock bands later had moderate success within the genre. The Little River Band's 1979 hit "Cool Change" combined psychedelia with elements of pop, jazz, soft rock, and progressive rock. Midnight Oil began their career in the forays of new wave and post-punk, utilising a style akin to Sgt. Pepper's Lonely Hearts Club Band and Diamond Dogs to create their 1981 record 10, 9, 8, 7, 6, 5, 4, 3, 2, 1. Hoodoo Gurus incorporated science-fiction into their college rock concept albums and, to an extent, the droning distorted guitars utilised by AC/DC to incorporate and develop upon psychedelic themes. Through to the 1990s, Australian acts such as the Vines presented a new era of music, a fusion between the psychedelic pop of the 1960s and the more modern rock stylings of 1990s-era bands such as Nirvana and Pearl Jam.

== 21st century ==
The neo-psychedelic rock scene has been primarily pioneered by Australian psychedelic and garage rock acts. One-man act Tame Impala, real name Kevin Parker, led the charge with the 2012 breakthrough hit "Elephant", which reached number 8 on Billboard's Alternative and received widespread radio play. This led to large demand of the act as a music festival headliner. Hiatus Kaiyote, led by singer Nai Palm, emerged around the same time, as did Perth native psych-rock Pond, with each offering a psychedelic sound influenced by R&B and hip-hop, creating music laced with reverb and complicated by distinct rhythmic syncopation.

King Gizzard & the Lizard Wizard has also been notable on the Melbourne psychedelic scene, releasing 26 studio albums and creating the label Flightless Records. Their sound draws from genres such as garage rock, hard rock and heavy metal, thrash metal (on Infest the Rats' Nest), Indian classical music, acoustic music, microtonal music (Flying Microtonal Banana, K.G., L.W.), boogie rock (demonstrated on Fishing for Fishies), dream pop (Butterfly 3000), indie rock, raga rock, blues rock, surf rock, jazz fusion, progressive rock, art rock and punk rock. The success of King Gizzard and the appeal of their live concerts helped launch the careers of other Flightless recording acts including the Murlocs, Stonefield, and Tropical Fuck Storm. Other important and emerging acts in the scene include Courtney Barnett, who developed a record label and a significant following, Psychedelic Porn Crumpets, Rolling Blackouts Coastal Fever, Bananagun, GUM, and Wolfmother.

== See also ==
- Rock music in Australia
- Aboriginal rock
- Australian indie rock
