= Mick Bower =

Michael "Mick" Bower
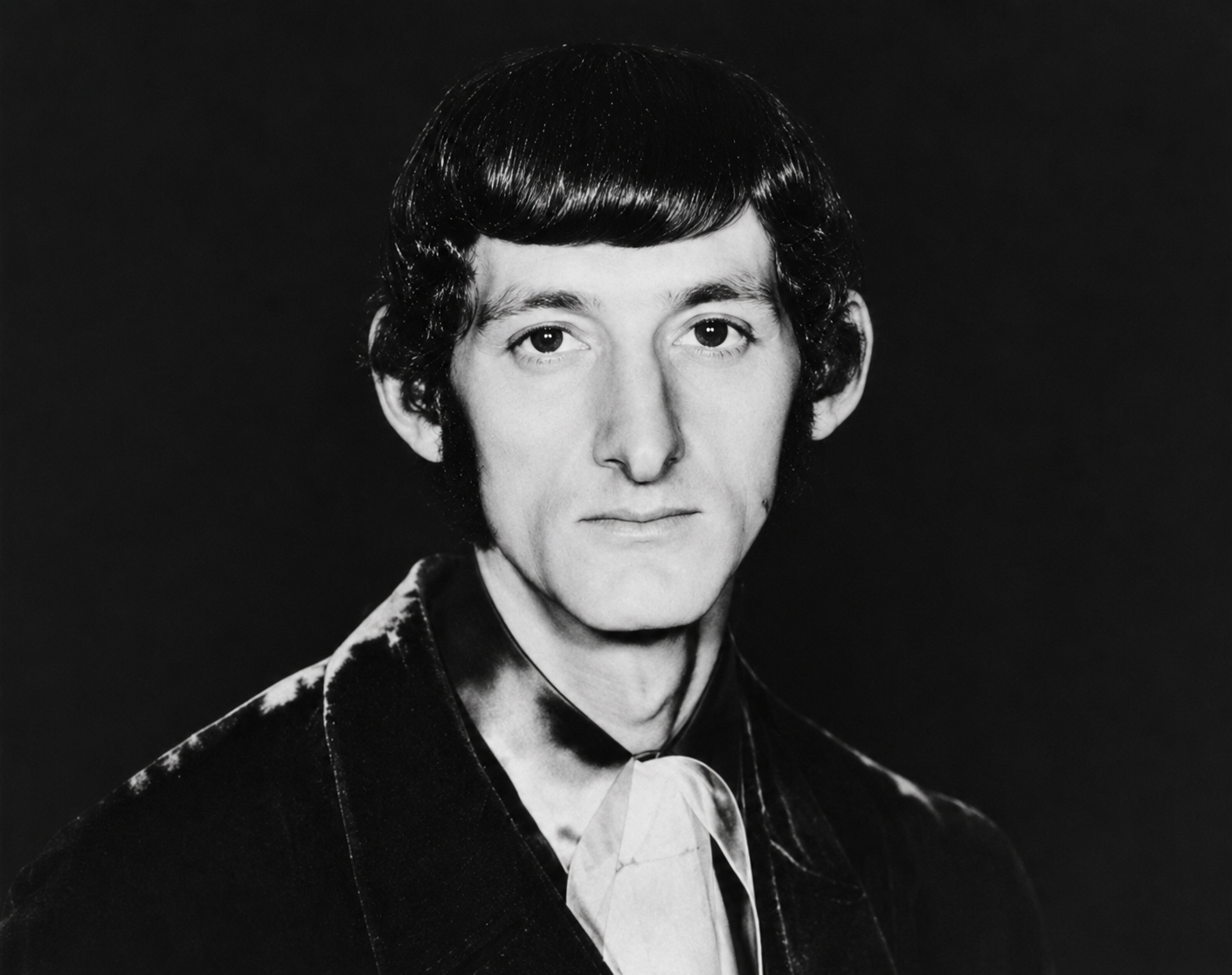

Background information
- Born: July 15, 1947 (age 79); Adelaide, South Australia, Australia
- Genres: Rock; Blues
- Instrument: Guitar
- Years active: 1964–present
- Label: Astor, The Grape Organisation
- Member of: The Masters Apprentices
- Formerly of: The Mustangs, The Others
- Award: 1967 – Australian Song of the Year – Living in A Child's Dream: 1998 – ARIA Hall of Fame – The Masters Apprentices; 2014 – South Australian Music Hall of Fame
- Website: themastersapprentices.com

Michael Joseph Bower (born 15th July 1947) is an Australian guitarist, songwriter and founding member of the rock band the Masters Apprentices. He founded the group in Adelaide in 1964, named the band, and served as its principal songwriter during its formative years. Between 1965 and 1967, Bower wrote or co-wrote virtually all of the band's original recorded material, including "Living in a Child's Dream", "Undecided", "Wars or Hands of Time", "Buried and Dead", "Hot Gully Wind", "But One Day" and "Tired of Just Wandering". His compositions helped shift Australian beat music away from reliance on overseas cover versions towards original songwriting and helped establish the Masters Apprentices as one of Australia's leading rock bands of the 1960s and have continued to influence later generations of musicians. His songs helped establish the Masters Apprentices as one of Australia's leading rock bands of the 1960s and have continued to influence later generations of musicians. His work has been recognised through the inclusion of the band's debut album in 100 Best Australian Albums and through recordings of his compositions by later artists including Silverchair and Radio Birdman.

== Early life ==
Bower grew up in Adelaide, South Australia, where he developed an interest in guitar and rhythm and blues music during the early 1960s. Influenced by British beat groups and American rock and roll, he formed the instrumental group The Mustangs in 1964 with drummer Brian Vaughton, guitarist Rick Morrison and bassist Gavin Webb. The band initially performed instrumental repertoire before recruiting Scottish-born singer Jim Keays as lead vocalist.

== The Masters Apprentices ==
Following Keays' arrival, Bower conceived the name the Masters Apprentices, inspired by hearing Ian Nancarrow of Adelaide group, The Others refer to songs by the Rolling Stones as being by "the masters' apprentices" because of the Stones' admiration for American blues pioneers. Under Bower's musical direction, the band developed a repertoire of original material at a time when many Australian beat groups relied heavily on overseas covers.

Bower wrote or co-wrote all of the band's original material recorded during its first three years, including the national hit singles "Undecided", "Buried and Dead", "Living in a Child's Dream" and "Wars or Hands of Time". His compositions combined rhythm and blues, beat music, psychedelia and social commentary, helping establish the Masters Apprentices as one of Australia's pioneering original rock bands. The band's 1967 debut album consisted almost entirely of Bower originals and is regarded as an important early Australian rock recording.

In late September 1967, while touring Tasmania, Bower suffered a severe nervous breakdown and was forced to leave the band on medical advice by October 1967. Bower's final gig from his original tenure with the band was at the 5KA Big Beat Spectacular in Adelaide. His departure marked the end of the founding era of the Masters Apprentices. Jim Keays later wrote that Bower had been "the spiritual leader, originator and true genius" of the group and described it as "whose band it really was".

Bower also established many of the band's early working methods and musical direction. During the group's formative years, he introduced a disciplined rehearsal process in which performances were regularly recorded and critically reviewed to improve arrangements and musicianship. He later recalled insisting that rehearsals were to involve "no girls and no booze", believing that distractions would hinder the band's progress. The approach helped the Masters Apprentices develop a polished repertoire of original material at a time when many Australian beat groups still relied primarily on overseas cover versions.

== Songwriting ==
Alongside figures such as Billy Thorpe, Harry Vanda and George Young, Bower belonged to the first generation of Australian rock musicians whose original songwriting helped establish a distinct local rock identity during the 1960s.

Bower's songwriting has been recognised as among the most influential of Australia's beat era. His composition "Living in a Child's Dream" was voted Australian Song of the Year in the 1967 Go-Set Pop Poll and is frequently cited as one of Australia's earliest psychedelic rock recordings. Music historian Ian D. Marks described "Living in a Child's Dream" as "Australia's first ever flower-pop record" and praised it as "a wondrous pop-song", highlighting its importance in the development of Australian psychedelic pop. Whilst other Bower penned songs "Undecided", "Buried and Dead" and "Wars or Hands of Time" became enduring staples of Australian rock.

His work has continued to reach new audiences through later recordings and performances. Silverchair recorded "Undecided" for the 1997 EP Garage Days Revisited, while "Living in a Child's Dream" has been recorded by the Reels and Agro. Contemporary Australian band Civic has also recorded "Wars or Hands of Time". In a 2024 interview, Radio Birdman co-founder Deniz Tek described Bower as "Australian rock's unsung hero" and named "Buried and Dead" among his favourite Australian songs.

After initially leaving the Masters Apprentices in 1967, Bower returned to Adelaide to recover from a nervous breakdown. He later completed his university entrance qualifications and attended university. Although he withdrew from the music industry, he continued writing songs, including "I Can't Help Thinking of You" for Adelaide group The Bucket in 1968 and "Angeline" for The Coachmen. His composition "I Can't Help Thinking Of You" was released by The Bucket on Festival Records in 1969. Reviewing the recording in Shindig! magazine, Jon "Mojo" Mills described it as a psychedelic recording "laced with masses of wah-wah and tricky, awkwardly navigated time signature changes", highlighting Bower's continued development as a songwriter following his departure from the Masters Apprentices. During the early 1970s he performed with the cover band the Amber Phase alongside former Masters Apprentices drummer Brian Vaughton, and later reunited with Vaughton in a reformed version of the Others. Outside music, Bower studied dentistry before pursuing a long career working with people with intellectual disabilities, later qualifying as a nurse and working in aged care while continuing to write music. His professional experience in disability services and healthcare influenced his longstanding commitment to community service. Throughout his later life, Bower has supported mental health and disability charities and, with the Masters Apprentices, has regularly volunteered his time for fundraising and benefit concerts, including Fire Aid bushfire relief events. Bower and Vaughton participated in a number of one off the Masters Apprentices reunions in the late 1980s, especially when the band would visit Adelaide, whilst Gavin Webb rejoined the band full time.

Music historians have also recognised the significance of Bower's compositions. In the liner notes to the 2009 Aztec Music reissue of The Master's Apprentices, Ian D. Marks described "Living in a Child's Dream" as "Australia's first ever flower-pop record", praising its evocative lyrics, melodic sophistication and counterpoint guitar lines, which he said elevated the song into "perfect pop-song territory". Marks also identified "Wars or Hands of Time" as one of the first Australian popular songs to address the Vietnam War, highlighting its place in the development of socially conscious Australian rock music.

Year	Song	Writer(s)	Highest Charting Position	Notes
1966	Poor Boy	Mick Bower		1966 Demo - Released in 2009
1966	Bye Bye Baby	Mick Bower/Rick Morrison		1966 Demo - Released in 2009
1966	Wild Wild Party	Mick Bower		1966 Demo - Released in 2009
1966	Undecided	Mick Bower/Rick Morrison	#13	
1966	Wars or Hands of Time	Mick Bower		B-side of Undecided
1967	Buried and Dead	Mick Bower	#26	
1967	She's My Girl	Mick Bower		B-side of Buried and Dead
1967	Hot Gully Wind	Mick Bower		EP track
1967	Living In A Child's Dream	Mick Bower	#9	
1967	Tired Of Just Wandering	Mick Bower		B-side of Living in a Child's Dream
1968	But One Day	Mick Bower		Astor released it after Bower had left the band, and the group publicly urged fans not to buy it.
1968	Theme For A Social Climber	Mick Bower		B-side of "Elevator Driver" (which reached #30)

== Reunion and later career ==
In 2014, Bower reunited with fellow founding members Brian Vaughton, Rick Morrison and Gavin Webb, for The Masters Apprentices' induction into the South Australian Music Hall of Fame. The reunion, held shortly after the death of original lead singer Jim Keays (and was meant to include him), marked the first performance by the band's founding line-up in decades and led to the re-establishment of the Masters Apprentices as an active touring band.

Following the reunion, Bower, Vaughton and Webb continued to lead the group, joined by vocalist Craig Holden (2014- Present) and a succession of musicians including Bill Harrod (2020-Present), Rick Harrison (2017-2023), Glenn Wheatley (2018), Dan Matejcic (2023-Present) and, for selected performances from 2026, former guitarist Doug Ford. Since reforming, the band has toured extensively throughout Australia, including national 60th anniversary tours in 2024 and 2025, and has appeared at major concerts and festivals celebrating Australian rock music. Combined with their original tenures with the Masters Apprentices, Mick Bower, Brian Vaughton and Gavin Webb are the longest serving members of the band.

Under the management of The Grape Organisation, the reformed Masters Apprentices have continued to receive public recognition. In 2018, it was announced by Adelaide City Council, the Masters Apprentices were to receive a dedicated music laneway as part of Adelaide's UNESCO City of Music designation, to date the laneway is still in discussion with the council. In 2021, readers of The Advertiser voted the group South Australia's favourite band, while in 2025 three of the band's recordings; "Turn Up Your Radio", "Because I Love You" and "Undecided" were voted among the top 20 South Australian songs in an ABC Radio Adelaide audience poll. These honours reflect the continuing popularity and cultural significance of the band more than fifty years after its formation.

== Legacy ==
Bower is regarded as one of the pioneers of Australian rock songwriting. Through his work with the Masters Apprentices, he helped establish the importance of original songwriting within Australian popular music during the 1960s. His compositions have remained influential for more than six decades and continue to be performed, reissued and recorded by later artists.

Bower's songwriting has continued to receive critical recognition long after its original release. In 2010, The Master's Apprentices, the band's self-titled 1967 debut album comprising predominantly original songs written by Bower, was ranked No. 35 in 100 Best Australian Albums, compiled by John O'Donnell, Toby Creswell and Craig Mathieson. In the accompanying book, Radio Birdman co-founder Deniz Tek described the album as "a revelation", praising its eclecticism and the band's remarkable musical versatility. Bower's anti-war composition "Wars or Hands of Time" was also selected to represent the album on the companion compilation Songs from the 100 Best Australian Albums.

Bower's compositions have remained influential for more than six decades and continue to be performed, reissued and recorded by later artists. His songs have been covered by artists including Silverchair, Radio Birdman, the Reels, Gore Gore Girls,The Not Quite, and The Gruesomes, while recordings of his work have appeared on numerous Australian and international compilation albums, including Nuggets II (Original Artyfacts from the British Empire and Beyond 1964–1969). His recordings have been sampled by the likes of Gnarls Barkley and The Libertines. The enduring appeal of his songwriting was reflected by Jim Keays, who later described Bower as "an inspired writer" and credited his songwriting as a major factor in the band's distinctive sound.

=== Awards ===
Year	Nominee/Work	Award	Result
1966	The Masters Apprentices	Best South Australian Group	Winner
1966	The Masters Apprentices	Hoadley's Battle of the Sounds – South Australian Final	Third Place
1967	The Masters Apprentices	Most Popular South Australian Group	Winner
1967	"Undecided" (Mick Bower, Rick Morrison)	5KA Top Talent Award – Listeners' Award	Winner
1967	"Living in a Child's Dream" (Mick Bower)	Best South Australian Record	Winner
1967	"Living in a Child's Dream" (Mick Bower)	Go-Set Australian Song of the Year	Winner
1967	The Masters Apprentices	Hoadley's Battle of the Sounds – National Final	Runner-up
1998	The Masters Apprentices	ARIA Hall of Fame	Recipient
2014	The Masters Apprentices	South Australian Music Hall of Fame	Recipient
2014	Michael Bower	South Australian Music Hall of Fame	Recipient

== See also ==
- The Masters Apprentices
