= A Toast to Panama Red =

A Toast To Panama Red

Studio album by The Masters Apprentices
- Released: January 1972
- Recorded: September–October 1971
- Studio: Abbey Road Studios, London; Air Studios, London
- Genre: Hard rock, psychedelic rock, progressive rock
- Length: 38:38
- Label: Columbia (Australia), Regal Zonophone (UK)
- Producer: Jeff Jarratt

The Masters Apprentices chronology
Nicklelodeon (1971)	A Toast To Panama Red (1972)	Do What You Wanna Do (1988)

Singles from A Toast To Panama Red
- 1. "Love Is" / "Southern Cross" Released: February 1972 (Australia)

A Toast To Panama Red is the fourth studio album by The Masters Apprentices, released in January 1972 on Regal Zonophone. It would be the group's final studio album until 1988's reunion album Do What You Wanna Do.

== Background and recording ==
In April 1971, Choice Cuts was released in Australia to widespread acclaim, reaching #11 on the Go-Set Top 20 Album Charts. They made numerous TV appearances, including a three-song live set for the ABC's GTK which included a live-in-the-studio performance of "Future of Our Nation".

When Choice Cuts was released in the UK it was well received by critics. EMI's John Halsall called from London to inform them that Choice Cuts was receiving glowing notices in the English music press, including a rave review in Melody Maker. Halsall urged them to return to London as soon as possible and that they would be able to record a new album there.

By the time they arrived in the UK in July, interest was waning. At this point a new UK label Bronze—who had just signed Slade and Uriah Heep—made an approach to the band. Although the group was hesitant, being still signed to EMI, they decided to use the offer as leverage in hopes of getting a better deal out of EMI. Wheatley delivered an ultimatum to EMI Australia, demanding that they either release the band from their contract or match Bronze's offer of £90,000 (or $180,000 in Australia). EMI did neither, responding with an advance of $1,000. Fearing legal repercussions, the band ruefully declined Bronze's offer, Keays' later opined that the best course of action would have been to "sign with Bronze and let the lawyers work it all out later."

Returning to Abbey Road in September 1971, the band were reunited with Jarratt and Brown, plus engineer (and Sgt. Pepper's Lonely Hearts Club Band veteran) Richard Lush. According to Wheatley, one of The Masters Apprentices' tracks, "Games We Play", was recorded at George Martin's Air Studios, with Martin himself conducting the children's choir which features on the second part of the track. The new album was titled A Toast to Panama Red, in homage to the Central American variety of marijuana.

Although Keays' recollections are more positive, Wheatley's own account of the album sessions is that they were an unhappy experience for him. He had a bad LSD trip the night before they went into the studio and began the recording in a negative frame of mind. Tensions mounted steadily during the recording and Wheatley did not play on some of the tracks, with his parts covered by Ford. According to Keays, Wheatley had been working part-time at a management agency over the previous few months and had insufficient time to rehearse because of his day job.

== Reception ==
The LP was lauded as one of the best Australian progressive releases, but it was largely ignored at the time. Sales were hindered by the lurid cover, which even Keays later admitted was not an ideal choice, being as garish as Choice Cuts was tasteful. Designed and painted by Keays, it was evidently a dig at the UK, and featured a grotesque psychedelic caricature of a bulldog's head wearing a Union Jack eye patch, its ears are skewered by an arrow from which dangles a tag, emblazoned with the album's title.

== Track listing ==
All songs written by Doug Ford and Jim Keays, except where noted.

Side A
No.	Title	Length
1.	"Answer Lies Beyond"	3:37
2.	"Beneath the Sun" (Doug Ford)	6:12
3.	"Games We Play - Part I"	7:00
4.	"Games We Play - Part II"	4:58

Side B
No.	Title	Length
1.	"The Lesson So Listen"	3:09
2.	"Love Is"	4:15
3.	"Melodies Of St. Kilda"	2:44
4.	"Southern Cross"	5:10
5.	"Thyme To Rhyme"	2:45

== Personnel ==
The Masters Apprentices

- Jim Keays – lead vocals, effects
- Doug Ford – electric and acoustic guitars, backing vocals
- Glenn Wheatley – bass, backing vocals
- Colin Burgess – drums, backing vocals, percussion

Other musicians

- Andrew Jackman – Arrangements: Choir, Brass (tracks: Games We Play - Part I & II, Love Is)
- Cahil Gibram – Poetry Excerpt From - The Prophet
- The Crikey Choir – Choir

Production team

- Producer – Jeff Jarratt
- Engineers – Nicky Webb, Peter Bown, Richard Lush

Artwork

- Jim Kayes – Artwork
- Peter Vernon – Photography
- Vicky Keays – Typography (Insert Lettering)
