= Do What You Wanna Do (album) =

Studio album by The Masters Apprentices
- Released: November 1988
- Genre: Rock
- Length: 38:00
- Label: Virgin Records
- Producer: Peter Blyton

The Masters Apprentices chronology
A Toast To Panama Red (1971)	Do What You Wanna Do (1988)

Singles from Do What You Wanna Do
- 1. "Because I Love You" / "I'm Your Satisfier" Released: October 1988; 2. "Birth of the Beat" Released: December 1988

Do What You Wanna Do is the fifth studio album by the Masters Apprentices, released in November 1988 on Virgin Records. It was the group's first album in 17 years since A Toast To Panama Red.

== Background ==
In the early 1980s there was a revival of interest in the Masters Apprentices due partly to rock historian Glenn A. Baker, who featured the band for his Rock & Roll Trivia Show on Sydney radio's Triple J, which in turn led to the release of a definitive compilation LP, Hands of Time by Baker's Raven Records in 1981. The classic Burgess, Ford, Keays and Wheatley line-up reformed in August 1987 for a "Back to the 1960s" special on the popular TV variety show Hey Hey It's Saturday. It marked the first time all four had played together since Wheatley had left in late 1971. They undertook a reunion tour during 1988 and released an album, Do What You Wanna Do, featuring new material and new versions of their earlier songs.

== Content ==
The album's first side contains new recordings of original material and two re-recordings of "Turn Up Your Radio" and "Because I Love You" (the band's most popular songs). "Because I Love You" also gained new prominence around that time via its use in a series of advertisements for a well-known brand of jeans; the revamped version of "Because I Love You" peaked at No. 30 on the ARIA Charts. Its Side B is live recordings taken from the 1988 reunion tour.

== Track listing ==
All songs written by Doug Ford and Jim Keays, except where noted.

Side A
No.	Title	Length
1.	"Howlin' At The Moon"	2:53
2.	"Turn Up Your Radio (1988 re-recording)"	3:23
3.	"Bedtime Girl"	3:45
4.	"Birth Of The Beat" (Doug Ford, Jim Kayes, Roger Faynes)	3:55
5.	"Because I Love You (1988 re-recording)"	4:50

Side B
No.	Title	Length
1.	"Blues Medley: Spoonful/Tobacco Road/I'm A Man/Crossroads (live)" (Willie Dixon/John D. Loudermilk/Ellas McDaniel/Robert Johnson)	10:49
2.	"Highway 61 Revisited (live)" (Bob Dylan)	3:45
3.	"Future Of Our Nation (live)" (Doug Ford)	5:23

== Personnel ==
The Masters Apprentices

- Doug Ford - acoustic guitar, electric guitar, vocals
- Jim Keays - vocals, harmonica
- Colin Burgess - drums, percussion
- Glenn Wheatley - bass
- Roger Faynes - Studio Bass and Keys
- Gavin Webb - bass on live recordings

Other musicians

- Massive Appendages - backing vocals
- Adrian McNeil - sarod
- Joe Camilleri - saxophone

Production team

- Producer - Peter Blyton
- Engineers (studio) - Adam Quaife, Angus Davidson
- Engineers (live) - Ernie Rose
- Assistant engineer - Tony Salter
- Mastering energineer - Alan Parsons

Artwork

- Millennium - artwork
