= Nickelodeon (album) =

Live album by The Masters Apprentices
- Released: November 1971
- Recorded: January 1971
- Venue: The Nickelodeon, Perth
- Genre: Hard rock, psychedelic rock
- Label: Columbia
- Producer: Howard Gable

The Masters Apprentices chronology
Master's Apprentices (Choice Cuts) (1971)	Nickelodeon (1971)	A Toast To Panama Red (1972)

Singles from Nickelodeon
- 1. "Future of Our Nation" / "New Day" Released: June 1971

Nickelodeon is the first live album by The Masters Apprentices, released in November 1971 on Columbia Records.

== Background ==
The Masters Apprentices began their 1971 national tour of Australia in Perth. They enlisted producer Howard Gable to recorded their first show at the Nickelodeon Theatre using portable four-track equipment. The band was tired and under-rehearsed, and were not satisfied with the results, these recordings became the live LP Nickelodeon, believed to be the second live rock album recorded in Australia. Two of its tracks—the brooding "Future of Our Nation" and the non-album cut "New Day"—were released as a single in June 1971.

== Reception ==
The lead single "Future of Our Nation" would reach #51 on the Go-Set National Top 60 Charts.

== Track listing ==
All songs written by Doug Ford and Jim Keays, except where noted.

Side A
No.	Title	Length
1.	"Future of Our Nation"	5:20
2.	"Evil Woman" (Larry Weiss)	19:19

Side B
No.	Title	Length
1.	"Because I Love You"	6:11
2.	"Light A Fire Within Yourself" (Doug Ford)	4:08
3.	"When I´ve Got Your Soul"	5:30
4.	"Fresh Air By the Ton"	9:21

== Personnel ==
The Masters Apprentices

- Doug Ford
- Jim Keays
- Colin Burgess
- Glenn Wheatley

Production team

- Producer – Howard Gable
