= The Masters Apprentices (1967 album) =

Studio album by The Masters Apprentices
- Released: June 1967
- Recorded: 1966–1967
- Studio: Max Pepper Studios, Adelaide
- Genres: Garage rock, psychedelic rock
- Length: 33:00
- Label: Astor
- Producer: Max Pepper

The Masters Apprentices chronology
The Masters Apprentices (EP) (1967)	The Masters Apprentices (1967)	Masterpiece (1970)

Singles from The Masters Apprentices
- 1. "Undecided" / "Wars Or Hands Of Time" Released: October 1966; 2. "Buried and Dead" / "She's My Girl" Released: May 1967; 3. "But One Day" / "My Girl" Released: August 1968

The Masters Apprentices is the self titled debut studio album by the Masters Apprentices, released in June 1967 on Astor Records. It featured two hit singles; "Undecided" and "Buried and Dead", both of which has been released on The Masters Apprentices EP in February 1967.

== Background ==
In mid-1966 Adelaide-based rock group, the Masters Apprentices, shared a gig with pop star, Bobby Bright (of Melbourne duo, Bobby & Laurie), who was impressed and recommended them to his label, Astor Records. A few weeks later, they were contacted by Astor's Max Pepper, who requested a four-track demo. The band went to Pepper's local two-track studio to record it, : "Hot Gully Wind", "Buried and Dead", "She's My Girl" and "Undecided". The demo became their debut extended play, The Masters Apprentices (February 1967).

"Undecided" was released as the group's debut single, "Undecided" backed by "Wars or Hands of Time", was released in October 1966 and gradually climbed the Adelaide charts, due to support from local DJs, peaking at No. 4. The B-side, "Wars or Hands of Time", written solely by Bower, is the first Australian pop song to directly address the issue of the Vietnam War, which was then affecting the lives of many young Australians because of the controversial introduction of conscription in 1965. Teen pop newspaper, Go-Set, started publishing their national singles charts in October 1966. By February of the following year the group had relocated to Melbourne and issued their four-track EP (which was self-titled) on Astor. "Undecided" peaked at No. 13 on the Go-Set National Top 40 in June 1967, spending sixteen weeks in the charts.

Due to the success of "Undecided" and the EP, Astor requested additional tracks to be recorded for a full-length album. The album itself is a compilation of the four tracks featured on the EP, five cover songs ("Dancing Girl", "I Feel Fine", "My Girl", "Don't Fight It" and "Johnny B Goode") and two new originals ("But One Day" and "Theme For A Social Climber") written by then chief songwriter and guitarist Mick Bower.

The album was released by Astor Records in June, 1967. It was later reissued on the budget Summit Records label in 1971. In 2009 a 2 CD special edition was released by reissue label Aztec Music.

== Reception ==
Professional ratings
Review scores
Source	Rating
Allmusic	link

In a retrospective review Allmusic was mixed on the album saying that the "Debut mixes sloppy covers of popular '60s rock and soul tunes with some fine originals".

== Track listing ==
All songs written by Mick Bower except as noted.

Side A
No.	Title	Length
1.	"But One Day"	2:39
2.	"Wars or Hands of Time"	2:52
3.	"Dancing Girl" (Bo Diddley)	3:13
4.	"I Feel Fine" (Lennon-McCartney)	3:23
5.	"My Girl" (Otis Redding)	2:23
6.	"Undecided"	2:29

Side B
No.	Title	Length
1.	"Hot Gully Wind"	2:51
2.	"Theme for a Social Climber"	1:54
3.	"Don't Fight It" (Steve Cropper, Wilson Pickett)	3:05
4.	"She's My Girl"	2:24
5.	"Johnny B. Goode" (Chuck Berry)	2:47
6.	"Buried and Dead"	2:41

2009 Aztec Music CD reissue bonus tracks - CD Disc 1
No.	Title	Writer(s)	Length
13.	"Living in a Child's Dream" (single)	Mick Bower	2:28
14.	"Tired of Just Wandering" (B-side to "Living In A Child's Dream" single)	Mick Bower	3:38
15.	"Elevator Driver" (single)	Brian Cadd, Max Ross	2:35
16.	"Brigette" (single)	Doug Ford, Jim Keays	2:30
17.	"Four Years of Five" (B-side to "Brigette" single)	Jim Keays, Peter Tilbrook	3:20
18.	"I Feel Fine (Alternate Version)" (Alternative song take)	Lennon-McCartney	3:06

2009 Aztec Music CD reissue bonus tracks - CD Disc 2 (Demos and rehearsals 1966)
No.	Title	Length
1.	"Blast Off"
2.	"Inside Looking Out" (Max Pepper Demo)
3.	"Black Girl (In the Pines)" (Max Pepper Demo)
4.	"Bye Bye Johnny" (Max Pepper Demo)
5.	"Dear Dad" (Max Pepper Demo)
6.	"Poor Boy" (Max Pepper Demo)
7.	"Bye Bye Baby" (Rehearsals in the Garage)
8.	"Wild Wild Party" (Rehearsals in the Garage)
9.	"Got My Mojo Working" (Rehearsals in the Garage)
10.	"Not Fade Away" (Rehearsals in the Garage)
11.	"Bright Lights, Big City" (Rehearsals in the Garage)
12.	"Little Girl" (Rehearsals in the Garage)
13.	"Around And Around" (Rehearsals in the Garage)
14.	"It's Gonna Work Out Fine" (Rehearsals in the Garage)
15.	"Cops and Robbers" (Rehearsals in the Garage)
16.	"Dimples" (Rehearsals in the Garage)
17.	"Just a Little Bit" (Rehearsals in the Garage)
18.	"Mama, Keep Your Big Mouth Shut" (Rehearsals in the Garage)
19.	"Don't Bring Me Down" (Rehearsals in the Garage)
20.	"Hey Bo Diddley" (Rehearsals in the Garage)
21.	"Road Runner" (Rehearsals in the Garage)

== Personnel ==
The Masters Apprentices

- Mick Bower – rhythm guitar
- Jim Keays – lead vocals
- Rick Morrison – lead guitar
- Brian Vaughton – drums
- Gavin Webb – bass guitar

Production team

- Producer – Max Pepper
