= Masterpiece (The Master's Apprentices album) =

1970 album

Studio album by The Masters Apprentices
- Released: February 1970
- Recorded: Early 1969 – early 1970
- Studios: EMI Studios, Sydney; Armstrong Studios, Melbourne
- Genres: Rock, psychedelic rock, psychedelic pop
- Length: 35:28
- Label: Columbia
- Producer: Howard Gable

The Masters Apprentices chronology
The Masters Apprentices (1967)	Masterpiece (1970)	Master's Apprentices (Choice Cuts) (1971)

Singles from Masterpiece
- 1. "Linda, Linda" / "Merry Go Round" Released: March 1969; 2. "5:10 Man" / "How I Love You" Released: July 1969

Masterpiece is the second studio album by The Masters Apprentices, released in February 1970 on Columbia Records.

== Background ==
The Masters Apprentices had been stockpiling tracks since they signed with EMI in 1969. 1969 began with The Masters Apprentices, settling their new line-up and the Ford/Keays writing team, and the band moved to its most successful phase. Their first EMI single, released in March 1969 was "Linda Linda"(A-side) / "Merry-Go-Round"(B-Side) and was the beginning of a short but successful collaboration with New Zealand-born producer Howard Gable.

The second single, the rocky "5:10 Man", released in July, which peaked at No. 16 on the Go-Set Singles Chart and initiated a string of Top 20 hits. It was a deliberate move towards a heavier sound, as the band were keen to move away from the current bubblegum craze that their manager and producer wanted.

During this period, Ford/Keays struggled to write new material due to the band's hectic live performance schedule. In February 1970, the second LP Masterpiece was finally released. Although something of a hodgepodge—as Keays freely admits—it showed the band developing a much broader range. It included the singles "Linda Linda" and "5:10 Man". The title track, a live recording, provides a vivid aural snapshot of their live show during 1968, complete with the deafening screams of fans. The album also includes their own version of "St John's Wood", a track Ford and Keays wrote for Brisbane band The Sect, who had released it as a single on Columbia during the year.

== Reception ==
Professional ratings
Review scores
Source	Rating
Allmusic	link

The album's retrospective reviews have been mixed. Allmusic's Richie Unterberger said "It's a respectable but oddly schizophrenic effort, finding them searching for an identity with competent forays into hard rock, early progressive rock, and poppy folk-rock, with orchestral instrumental links between many of the tracks adding to the confusion (as there's no concept driving the LP)."

When writing about the album in Freedom Train, Australian rock journalist Ian McFarlane was complimentary of several of the album's tracks, but said that "Linda, Linda" and "Piece Of Me" were "just plain bad". "Part of the problem lays in the fact that the band are concerned with making the obligatory profound musical statement (the first side had all the tracks segued into one another in the manner of the Beatles' Sgt. Pepper's, each linked by a short orchestral piece). As a result the album comes over as all solemn and self consciously arty, and is totally overblown. "

== Track listing ==
All songs written by Doug Ford and Jim Keays.

Side A
No.	Title	Length
1.	"Masterpiece"	4:02
2.	"Who Do You Think You Are"	3:07
3.	"Barefoot When I Saw Her"	3:58
4.	"St. John's Wood"	2:00
5.	"5:10 Man"	2:34
6.	"A Dog, A Siren & Memories"	3:11

Side B
No.	Title	Length
1.	"Linda Linda"	2:43
2.	"Isabella"	2:35
3.	"Captivating Voice"	2:03
4.	"Piece Of Me"	2:15
5.	"Titanic"	3:32
6.	"How I Love You"	3:07

== Personnel ==
The Masters Apprentices

- Doug Ford – lead guitar, acoustic guitar, banjo, vocal
- Jim Keays – vocal, percussion
- Colin Burgess – drums, percussion, vocal
- Glenn Wheatley – bass, tambourine, marraccas, vocals

Other musicians

- The Chiffons – backing vocals on "5:10 Man"
- Gavin Webb – bass guitar
- Peter Tilbrook – guitars, bass

Production team

- Producer – Howard Gable
- Engineers – John Sayers, Roger Savage

Artwork

- Photography – Allan Kleinman
- Cover Design – Whaite & Emery
