= His Majesty (band) =

Australian hard rock band

- Also known as: Good Time Charlie
- Genres: Hard rock
- Years active: 1983–1987, 1992–1998
- Labels: Regal, MCA
- Past members: Colin Burgess; Denny Burgess; Yukiko Davis; Mitch Smith; Colin Williams; John Botica; Claude Woodward

His Majesty were an Australian hard rock group which formed in 1983 by two brothers, Colin (ex-AC/DC) on drums and Denny Burgess (ex-The Throb) on bass guitar. Both were former members of the Masters Apprentices. His Majesty also included Yukiko Davis on lead vocals, Mitch Smith on keyboards and Colin Williams on guitar.

== History ==
The band recorded a string of unsuccessful singles. One track, "C me comin'" (February 1985), was used throughout Australia as the opener for the United States feature film, Ghostbusters, a historical first for an Australian group. The group disbanded in 1987. They reformed in 1992 with a new line-up, they changed their name to Good Time Charlie by 1998 but disbanded late that year.

In 1986 and again in 1992-93 His Majesty were the Australian backing band for Tiny Tim, with whom they recorded two albums, Tiny Tim - Rock (1992) and Tiny Tim's Christmas Album (1993). The 1992 line-up includes two new members, American keyboardist Claude Woodward formerly of Perth band, Visitor, and a new lead guitarist in John Botica formerly of the United Kingdom post punk band, The Labrats.

The band went through a number of line-up changes throughout the mid-1990s eventually changing its name to Good Time Charlie. This band released an album, Adults Only, in October 1998, which they had begun recording in the late 1980s at Alberts Studios in Sydney with original guitar tracks performed by John Robinson (ex-Blackfeather). Robinson was the producer for those original tracks, although later tracks were added by guitarist John Botica and were produced and engineered by Tom Kazas (ex- The Moffs). The Burgess brothers were both seriously injured in a car accident in November 1998; Denny's wife, Clare, described their condition in December, "We're certainly off the road for a while now ... We're just so glad they're kicking and should recover fully. It will be a long hard haul for them. Denny and Colin are both pretty smashed up."
