= Cybotron =

"Cybotron" can refer to:

- Cybotron (American band), an American electro band
- Cybotron (Australian band), an electronic/experimental group
- Cybotron, an album and alter-ego of Dillinja

== See also ==
- Cybertron
