= Daisy Clover =

Australian rock band

- Origin: Melbourne, Victoria, Australia
- Genres: Rock, Pop Rock, Soul
- Years active: 1967–1973
- Label: Festival
- Past members: Greg Hunt; Alf Giarrusso; Nick Kenos; John Taylor; Jimmy Maxwell; Bernadette O'Neil

Daisy Clover were an Australian rock band formed in 1967. They named themselves "Daisy Clover", inspired by the 1965 film Inside Daisy Clover. By 1969, their line up was Greg Hunt on the vocals, Nick Kenos on lead guitar, Alf Giarrusso (Alfie Red) on the drums, Jimmy Maxwell on the organ and John Taylor (formerly of the Town Criers) on the bass.

In July 1969, they released their first single "Tell Me" published by Festival Records. The B side to that single featured their song "Butterflies". They subsequently released their second single "Penny Brown Girl" in November 1969. Their song "Barbara" was featured on the B side.

Their single "Butterflies" reached #27 and "Penny Brown Girl" reached #38 in the Melbourne Charts While nationally they only made it to No.67 (Butterflies peaked late June of 1969) and No.79 (Penny Brown Girl, peaked in early February of 1970). In 2014, their song "Butterflies" was featured in the compilation CD, Upside Down: Volume 3, track 14.

In 1969, Daisy Clover appeared on numerous TV programs in Australia, this included performances on the ABC program Hit Scene.

By early 1970, in an attempt to change their image, they recruited a female singer, Bernadette O'Neil, to perform alongside Greg. It was around this time The Masters Apprentices booking agency, Drum, assisted Daisy Clover with promoting some of their gigs.

By 1971 the band broke up, however, Greg Hunt continued the band for a few years later with new members. Their new line up was Wayne Finschi on the drums, George Kurtis on the organ, Billy Tomasini on lead guitar, Doug Warren on bass. Chrissy Amphlett joined the band in 1973 when she was 14 years of age. In her autobiography 'Pleasure and Pain: My Life' she briefly describes her experiences with the band, with their new members.

== Discography ==
=== Singles ===
- Tell Me (1969) Festival Records FK- 2993 #67 (June 1969).
- Penny Brown Girl (1969) Festival Records FK- 3368 #79 (peaked early February 1970).

== See also ==
- Town Criers
- Chrissy Amphlett
- Rock music in Australia
