= Living in a Child's Dream =

Single by The Masters Apprentices

from the album The Masters Apprentices Vol. 2
- B-side: "Tired of Just Wandering"
- Released: August 1967
- Recorded: 1967
- Studio: Armstrong Studios, South Melbourne
- Genre: Psychedelic pop
- Length: 2:28
- Label: Astor
- Songwriter(s): Michael Bower
- Producer(s): Dick Heming; Roger Savage; Ian Meldrum

The Masters Apprentices singles chronology
"Buried and Dead" (1967)	"Living in a Child's Dream" (1967)	"Elevator Driver" (1968)

"Living in a Child's Dream" is a song by Australian rock group, the Masters Apprentices. It was released in August 1967 on Astor Records as the lead single from the band's second extended play, The Masters Apprentices Vol. 2. The track was written by the group's guitarist, Mick Bower. It peaked at No. 9 on the Go-Set national singles charts.

== Background ==
In February 1967 the Masters Apprentices relocated to Melbourne from Adelaide, and in June they issued their debut self-titled album on Astor Records. It was recorded at the newly opened Armstrong Studios in South Melbourne and was nominally produced by staff producer, Dick Heming. According to lead singer, Jim Keays, Heming's input was limited and most of the production was by audio engineer, Roger Savage, with considerable input from Ian Meldrum.

In August 1967 the band released "Living in a Child's Dream" which reached the top ten in most state capitals and peaked at No. 9 on Go-Set's National Top 40.

The track was written by the group's guitarist, Mick Bower. Australian musicologist, Ian McFarlane, described it as "blissful psychedelic pop." Fellow music journalist, Ed Nimmervoll, opined that it "saw the first dramatic shift in direction for the [band], this time offering a melodic pop piece with psychedelic lyrics. With a national top ten hit on their hands [they] were now one of the most popular groups in the country." It was voted Australian Song of the Year by Go-Set readers.

== Track listing ==
No.	Title	Writer(s)	Length
1.	"Living in a Child's Dream"	Michael Bower	2:28
2.	"Tired of Just Wandering"	Bower	2:17

== Personnel ==
The Masters Apprentices

- Mick Bower – rhythm guitar
- Steve Hopgood – drums
- Jim Keays – lead vocals, harmonica
- Tony Summers – lead guitar
- Gavin Webb – bass guitar

Recording

- Producer – Dick Heming, Roger Savage, Ian Meldrum
- Engineer – Roger Savage
