= Master's Apprentices (1971 album) =

Studio album by The Masters Apprentices
- Released: March 1971
- Recorded: September 1970
- Studio: Abbey Road Studios, London
- Genres: Hard rock, psychedelic rock, progressive rock
- Length: 35:28
- Labels: Columbia (Australia), Regal Zonophone (UK)
- Producer: Jeff Jarratt

The Masters Apprentices chronology
Masterpiece (1970)	Master's Apprentices (1971)	Nicklelodeon (1971)

Singles from Master's Apprentices
- 1. "Because I Love You" / "I'm Your Satisfier" Released: January 1971

Master's Apprentices (re-titled Choice Cuts in Australia) is the third studio album by The Masters Apprentices, released in March 1971 on Regal Zonophone.

== Background ==
In mid-1969, The Masters Apprentices won a boat trip to England in Hoadley's "Battle of the Sounds". With this the group were set on breaking into the UK market. They worked to save money for the effort with a national farewell tour in April–May. On 25 May, they boarded the Fairsky for the UK, leaving their agency business in the hands of Adrian Barker. The six-week ocean voyage provided a break after years of constant gigging. Without the pressure and distraction of touring, they wrote and rehearsed new material. They had a stopover in Panama, where they were 'ripped off' while they bought some local marijuana. Arriving at the height of an English summer in July, the band entered a productive period. They moved into a hotel in Bayswater, but it was too expensive, so they moved to a house in North Harrow, London, where they continued to write and rehearse, and made contact with other Aussie expatriates. Freed from constant performing, they immersed themselves in the cultural life of London, going on shopping sprees for clothes in Kings Road, Chelsea, ploughing through scores of new records and doing the rounds of clubs and concerts, seeing the best music on offer.

Having only been advanced $500 by EMI Australia, bassist Glenn Wheatley started knocking on doors in hopes of getting the band established in London and possibly securing a record deal. Wheatley contacted EMI in London, and met Trudy Green, secretary to staff producer Jeff Jarratt. Green was later an artist manager for Heart, Janet Jackson and Mick Jagger. She liked the Australian band and got Jarratt interested, he agreed to produce them. EMI Australia agreed to pay for the album's recording, with EMI UK providing the artwork; the group were thrilled to record at the legendary Abbey Road Studios with Jarratt and engineer Peter Bown. Jarratt had worked on some of The Beatles' later recordings, and Brown's credits included Pink Floyd's A Saucerful of Secrets, Ummagumma and Atom Heart Mother.

Just before the start of recording, Keays made a trip to mainland Europe, and was in Copenhagen when he heard of the death of Jimi Hendrix, one of his idols. Back in London, Ford and Keays penned "Song for a Lost Gypsy", which they added to their songlist. The band entered the studio in September to record the new album. The staff and facilities were superior to those in Australia, which allowed a greater range of expression. The songs they brought to the sessions—many written during the voyage—were original and distinctive, distilling their recent musical influences. This included the heavier sounds of Hendrix, King Crimson and Free, as well as the acoustic styles of Donovan, the Small Faces and Van Morrison (whose Astral Weeks LP was on constant rotation at their North Harrow house). They brought in outside musicians to augment some tracks, and made use of Paul McCartney's white grand piano on a few cuts, including "Because I Love You". During sessions they bumped into a Who's Who of UK music: The Moody Blues, Pink Floyd, Barclay James Harvest, Ringo Starr and Roy Harper. Towards the end of recording, they found themselves one song short of the optimum LP length, so at Jarratt's suggestion they wrote a new song, built up from a Latin-flavoured instrumental shuffle that Ford had been playing with. Keays wrote lyrics for the piece overnight, they cut it the next day and it became the album's opening track "Rio de Camero".

The entire LP was recorded, mixed and mastered within a month, and the band were thrilled with the results. The choice of the first single was, "Because I Love You", a song of love, separation and independence, and became a popular and enduring recording. To promote it, they used Australian film-maker Timothy Fisher to make a music video. The simple but effective clip was filmed on a chilly autumn morning on Hampstead Heath. Black-and-white prints were shown many times on Australian TV, where colour was not introduced until 1975, but it was shot in colour, as were several other clips for tracks from the LP, most were not screened.

The album's cover depicts an elegant, overstuffed chair in a panelled room, with a mysterious disembodied hand holding a cigarette floating above it. It was from the English design group Hipgnosis, who were responsible for covers by Pink Floyd, 10cc and Led Zeppelin. Despite the prospects for their new LP, the band were caught by surprise after its completion when Wheatley revealed they were almost broke. They were determined to stay in London but desperately needed funds. A phone call to EMI Australia for financial assistance proved futile, so they planned an Australian tour. Wheatley headed home to organise it and secured a local soft drink company as a sponsor. The band returned to Australia at the end of December, just as "Because I Love You" was released. It was their fourth consecutive Top 20 hit, reaching No. 12 nationally, and became one of the key songs of the new era of Australian rock. The album's title internationally was Master's Apprentices, however since their debut album already bore that name in Australia, it was re-titled Choice Cuts. This alternate title only featured on the label the original vinyl record's label, while the front cover still featured the same title and artwork as the self-titled album.

== Reception ==
Complementary reviews of the album were positive. Melody Maker's Ray Hollingworth praised the album's original sounding material, particularly "Because I Love You"; "Maybe it's the strong use of acoustic guitar, maybe it's the blowing energetic scores and vocals 'Because I Love You' is one of those splendid shifting things.". However, despite positive reviews, the album failed to make any impact on the UK charts.

In Australia, the lead single "Because I Love You" would reach #12 on the Go-Set National Top 60 Charts. When the album was released in Australia in April 1971 as Choice Cuts, initial sales were slow. Eventually, by July, the album would climb to #11 on the Go-Set Top 20 Albums Charts.

== Track listing ==
All songs written by Doug Ford and Jim Keays, except where noted.

Side A
No.	Title	Length
1.	"Rio De Camero"	4:02
2.	"Michael" (Doug Ford)	3:07
3.	"Easy To Lie"	3:58
4.	"Because I Love You"	4:30
5.	"Catty" (Doug Ford)	2:34

Side B
No.	Title	Length
1.	"Our Friend Owsley Stanley 3"	2:43
2.	"Death Of A King" (Doug Ford)	2:35
3.	"Song For A Lost Gypsy"	2:03
4.	"I'm Your Satisfier"	2:15
5.	"Song For Joey - Part 2" (Colin Burgess, Doug Ford, Glenn Wheatley, Jim Keays)	3:32

== Personnel ==
The Masters Apprentices

- Doug Ford
- Jim Keays
- Colin Burgess
- Glenn Wheatley

Other musicians

- Larry Steel – Congas (tracks: Rio De Camero)
- Claude Lintott – Jew's Harp (tracks: I'm Your Satisfier)

Production team

- Producer – Jeff Jarratt
- Engineers – John Kurlander, Peter Bown

Artwork

- Photography and Cover Design – Hipgnosis

== Charts ==
Chart	Peak Position
Australia (Go-Set Top 20 Album)	11
