= Colin Burgess (musician) =

Australian drummer (1945–2023)

- Drumming on "Turn Up Your Radio" by the Masters Apprentices c. 1970

Background information
- Born: Colin John Burgess; 16 November 1946; Sydney, Australia
- Died: 16 December 2023 (aged 77) Sydney, Australia
- Genres: Rock
- Instrument: Drums
- Years active: 1967–2023
- Formerly of: The Masters Apprentices; AC/DC; His Majesty

Colin John Burgess (16 November 1946 – 16 December 2023) was an Australian rock musician who was the drummer in the Masters Apprentices from 1968 to 1972. He was later the original drummer with hard rock band AC/DC from November 1973 to February 1974. The Masters Apprentices had top 20 singles chart success with "5:10 Man", "Think about Tomorrow Today", "Turn Up Your Radio" and "Because I Love You".

In 1998, the Masters Apprentices, with Burgess, were inducted into the ARIA Hall of Fame. He performed in various bands with his brother, Denny Burgess, on bass guitar and vocals, including His Majesty.

== Life and career ==
=== Early career ===
Colin John Burgess was born on 16 November 1946 in Sydney and grew up with his brother Denny. He was the drummer for the band the Untamed, with Joe Travers on guitar, in Sydney. In 1965, Denny Burgess was an early bass guitarist and vocalist of surf-instrumental band the Throb. In 1967, Burgess and Denny formed psychedelic group Honeybunch with Travers and Bill Verbaan on bass guitar (ex-Morloch). Later that year, the band was renamed "The Haze".

=== The Masters Apprentices ===
Late in 1965, the Masters Apprentices had formed in Adelaide as a pop and rock band. In early 1967 they relocated to Melbourne and by late that year their career had reached a critical juncture. Both their drummer Steve Hopgood and lead guitarist Tony Sommers were disenchanted with the band's erratic fortunes, so founding member Jim Keays decided to replace them. In Sydney, the Burgess brothers met Keays when the Haze supported the Masters Apprentices at a gig in suburban Ashfield.

In January 1968, Keays reorganised the Masters Apprentices with Summers and Hopgood departing. Burgess was flown to Melbourne as the new drummer. Keays then approached Doug Ford, an electric guitarist from the Missing Links and its offshoot Running Jumping Standing Still. In May 1970 the group with, Glenn Wheatley on bass guitar, relocated to London but had little commercial success there. Wheatley left in late 1971 and by early 1972 Keays announced his own departure and his intention to return to Australia immediately.

Ford and Burgess decided to keep going and they sent for Burgess' brother Denny, who took over on bass guitar and lead vocals. The final trio line-up soldiered on for a few months and made one recording, "Freedom Seekers"—appearing on Jam It Up! in 1987—before finally splitting in mid-1972. During Burgess' tenure, the Masters Apprentices had top 20 singles chart success on the Go-Set National Top 40 with "5:10 Man", "Think about Tomorrow Today", "Turn Up Your Radio" and "Because I Love You".

=== AC/DC ===
Burgess returned to Australia and, in November 1973, was recruited for the formation of hard rockers AC/DC. He joined Malcolm Young on rhythm guitar, his brother Angus on lead guitar, Dave Evans on lead vocals and Larry Van Kriedt on bass guitar. Burgess was fired in February 1974 for being drunk on stage. He later said that someone had spiked his drink.

Burgess was replaced by a succession of drummers before Phil Rudd joined in February–March 1975. When Rudd injured his hand in a fight in Melbourne in September 1975, Burgess was recalled as his replacement for a few weeks.

In a twist of fate, Burgess was at the Music Factory in London on the evening of 18 February 1980. There, Burgess was one of the last people to speak with Bon Scott before Scott left the club. Bon Scott died that night.

=== Later career and death ===
In 1983, Burgess and his brother Denny formed the hard rock band His Majesty with Japanese singer Yukiko Davis and Spike Williams on guitar. Though the band folded in 1988, in 1992 a new lineup which included lead guitarist John Botica and keyboardist Claude Woodward was invited by Regular Records to cut an album with Tiny Tim. Released in November, the album, Rock, included an unlikely cover of AC/DC's Highway To Hell. By 1998, His Majesty had transformed into Good Time Charlie. Good Time Charlie toured Southeast Asia and recorded an album, Adults Only, which was produced by John Robinson formerly of Australian band Blackfeather.

In October 1998 the Masters Apprentices were inducted into the ARIA Hall of Fame as the classic line-up of Burgess, Ford, Keays and Wheatley. One month later both Burgess brothers were in a vehicle collision while travelling to a CD launch party for Good Time Charlie, "Both were severely injured. Colin suffered multiple fractures and internal injuries and as a result could not be moved from the wreck for some time... Both made a recovery." In 2005, a documentary of the brothers, The Comeback Kings, filmed by Joel Peterson was issued. Colin and Denny Burgess performed and recorded as the Burgess Brothers Band and later as Burgess Burgess.

Burgess also played with a project pulled together by a guitar teacher named Steve Flack called Guitar Heroes, which showcases some of Australia's finest veteran guitarists in a blues/hard rock context outside the one in which they are usually perceived. This saw him play with, among others, Chain's Phil Manning, Phil Emmanuel, Kahvas Jute's Dennis Wilson, the Angels' Bob Spencer, Choirboys' Brad Carr, the Radiators' Fess Parker, the Backsliders' Dom Turner and the Atlantics' Martin Cilia. The Atlantics' bass player from 2006 to 2012, Michael Smith, has been the project's regular live bassist since its inception in 2004.

Burgess was later part of Dead Singer Band, a tribute band. He performed around Australia in the Dead Singer Band Lost Legends Showcase, a show dedicated to Australian singers who have died.

Colin John Burgess died on 16 December 2023, which was announced by AC/DC's official social media, he died at the age of 77.

== Awards and nominations ==
=== Go-Set Pop Poll ===
The Go-Set Pop Poll was coordinated by teen-oriented pop music newspaper Go-Set. It was established in February 1966 and conducted an annual poll from 1966 to 1972 of its readers to determine the most popular personalities.

Year	Nominee / work	Award	Result
1970	himself	Best drummer	1st
1971	himself	Best drummer	1st
