= Cybotron (Australian band) =

Australian band

- Left to right: Steve Maxwell Von Braund and Geoff Green, 1978

Background information
- Origin: Melbourne, Victoria, Australia
- Genres: Electronic, progressive rock
- Years active: 1975–1981
- Labels: Clear Light of Jupiter, Champagne, Cleopatra
- Past members: Steve Maxwell Von Braund; Geoff Green; Gil Matthews; Henry Vyhnal; Jim Keays; Colin Butcher; Chris Guice; Mark Jones

Cybotron were an Australian electronic, experimental music band formed in 1975 by Steve Maxwell Von Braund on synthesiser, electronic percussion, and alto saxophone; and Geoff Green on keyboard, organ, and synthesiser. The group issued three studio albums, Cybotron (1976), Colossus (1978) and Implosion (1980) and disbanded by 1981. Australian musicologist, Ian McFarlane, noted that they were "a bona fide experimental outfit, and the band's eponymous debut album featured a mix of heavy synthesiser kinetics, organ drones and pulsating electronic beats".

== History ==
Cybotron were formed in 1975 in Melbourne as an electronic, experimental music band by Steve Maxwell Von Braund on synthesiser, electronic percussion, and alto saxophone; and Geoff Green on keyboard, organ, and synthesiser. In 1975 Braund had issued his debut solo album, Monster Planet, with contributions from Green, Gil Matthews on drums (ex-Billy Thorpe and the Aztecs), Henry Vyhnal on electric violin and Jim Keays on lead vocals (ex-The Masters Apprentices). Australian musicologist, Ian McFarlane, described Cybotron as "a bona fide experimental outfit".

Cybotron released a self-titled album in 1976 on the Clear Light of Jupiter label which contained mainly synthesisers and saxophone. It was recorded at Armstrong Studios with Braund and Green producing, they used the same personnel as for Braund's solo album. McFarlane noted that Cybotron "featured a mix of heavy synthesiser kinetics, organ drones and pulsating electronic beats". The group were influenced by Ash Ra Tempel, Hawkwind and Tangerine Dream. They created minimalist, repetitive electronica similar to Kraftwerk's Autobahn (November 1974). Cybotron were pioneers of Australian electronic music with their version of Kraut rock while the local music scene was dominated by pub rock.

Clear Light of Jupiter was owned by Jeremy Fiebiger (also owner of a record store, Pipe Imports) and two business partners, Daniel and Charlie O'Halloran. Fiebiger also managed Cybotron. Australian music journalist, Andrew Feyne, described the group as "Absolutely brilliant, keyboard dominated, late progressive band with a massive symphonic sound". A live album, Saturday Night Live, was issued in 1977 from an on-air radio broadcast on 3ZZ in Melbourne. It was followed in 1978 by their second studio album, Colossus, with Colin Butcher joining to provide drums, percussion, and synthesiser. McFarlane felt it had a "more progressive edge backed by a massive symphonic sound". Allmusic's Richard Foss noted they had "hit a peak with Colossus, which benefited from the presence of drummer and synth player Colin Butcher. This album sold better in Europe and the U.S.A. as an import than it did in Australia, and for a few milliseconds it looked like the band might break internationally".

By 1980 Braund and Green had split, with Braund recording Cybotron's third studio album, Implosion, which was issued on Cleopatra Records that year and included Mark Jones on bass guitar, guitar, and keyboards; and Matthews returning on drums and keyboards. McFarlane described it as having "followed the symphonic route, but with a pop tinge to a couple of tracks". "Eureka", from Implosion, was played on United States college radio stations. By 1981 Cybotron had disbanded.

From September 2002 Mark Woods remastered their albums for CD. Also that year Green announced that Cybotron was in the process of recording new material. As of January 2009, this material was not released. In January 2006 Cybotron's Implosion was re-released by Aztec Music in an expanded CD version with five of its bonus tracks from an incomplete and unreleased fourth studio album, Abbey Moor, planned for 1981.

In August 2020, Braund released Return to Monster Planet. In December 2022, Green released Exodus to Genesis.

== Members ==
- Steve Maxwell Von Braund – synthesiser, electronic percussion, alto saxophone (1975–1981)
- Geoff Green – keyboard, organ, synthesiser (1975–1980)
- Gil Matthews – drums, keyboards, recording engineer (1975–1977, 1980)
- Henry Vyhnal – electric violin (1976)
- Jim Keays – vocals (1976)
- Colin Butcher – drums, percussion, synthesiser (1977–1978)
- Chris Guice -Drums (1979-1980)
- Mark Jones – bass guitar, guitar, keyboards (1980)

== Discography ==
=== Albums ===
- Cybotron (1976)
- Saturday Night Live (1977)
- Colossus (1978)
- Implosion (Oct 1980)

=== Singles ===
- "Colossus" (1978)
- "Encounter" (1980)
- "Ride to Infinity" (1980)
