= Howard Lindley =

Howard Lindley (died 1972) was an Australian freelance journalist, film maker, and music writer for POL and Go-Set magazines. In the late 1960s he edited a trade journal, Lumiere, on the film and TV industry, where he supervised its section on avant-garde and experimental film. Lindley committed suicide in 1972 after starting work on a film about the Australian rock band, The Masters Apprentices.
