= Undecided (Masters Apprentices song) =

Single by The Masters Apprentices

from the album The Masters Apprentices (EP) & The Masters Apprentices
- B-side: "Wars or Hands of Time"
- Released: October 1966
- Recorded: 1966
- Studio: Adelaide
- Genre: Rock
- Length: 2:22
- Label: Astor
- Songwriters: Michael Bower, Richard Morrison
- Producer: Max Pepper

The Masters Apprentices singles chronology
"Undecided" (1966)	"Buried and Dead" (1967)

"Undecided" is the debut single by Australian rock group, the Masters Apprentices, which was issued in October 1966 on Astor Records. It peaked at No. 13 on the Go-Set national singles charts. It was included on The Masters Apprentices debut EP and The Masters Apprentices debut studio album, both released in 1967.

== Background ==
In mid-1966 Adelaide-based rock group, the Masters Apprentices, shared a gig with pop star, Bobby Bright (of Melbourne duo, Bobby & Laurie), who was impressed and recommended them to his label, Astor Records. A few weeks later, they were contacted by Astor's Max Pepper, who requested a four-track demo. The band went to a local two-track studio to record it, but realised that they had only three suitable songs: "Hot Gully Wind", "Buried and Dead" and "She's My Girl". The demo became their debut extend play, The Masters Apprentices (February 1967).

Needing a fourth track, the group's guitarists Mick Bower and Rick Morrison wrote a new song, "Undecided", in about 15 minutes; the instrumental backing was cut in about the same time. The title came from the fact that they were undecided about a name for the song when quizzed by studio owner and producer, Pepper. The biting fuzz-tone of Bower's guitar on the track was a fortunate accident; it was caused by a malfunctioning valve in his amplifier, but the group liked the sound and kept the faulty valve in until after the session.

Their debut single, "Undecided" backed by "Wars or Hands of Time", was released in October 1966 and gradually climbed the Adelaide charts, due to support from local DJs, peaking at No. 4. The B-side, "Wars or Hands of Time", written solely by Bower, is the first Australian pop song to directly address the issue of the Vietnam War, which was then affecting the lives of many young Australians because of the controversial introduction of conscription in 1965. Teen pop newspaper, Go-Set, started publishing their national singles charts in October 1966. By February of the following year the group had relocated to Melbourne and issued their four-track EP on Astor. "Undecided" peaked at No. 13 on the Go-Set National Top 40 in June 1967, spending sixteen weeks in the charts.

ABC-TV series, Long Way to the Top, was broadcast in August 2001. Lead singer Jim Keays featured in "Episode 2: Ten Pound Rocker 1963–1968" where he discussed the UK migrant influence on the Masters Apprentices early work and how "Undecided" was issued. He recalled "I was at the drive-in with my girlfriend and in between the two movies I switched off the drive-in speaker and put on the car radio and 'Undecided' came on, one of the songs we'd recorded as a demo. And I couldn't believe it, it was just a shock. There it was and sure enough we were the last ones to know that it was released."

== Track listing ==
No.	Title	Writer(s)	Length
1.	"Undecided"	Michael Bower, Richard Morrison	2:22
2.	"Wars or Hands of Time"	Bower	2:50

== Personnel ==
The Masters Apprentices

- Mick Bower – rhythm guitar
- Jim Keays – lead vocals
- Rick Morrison – lead guitar
- Brian Vaughton – drums
- Gavin Webb – bass guitar

Recording and artwork

- Graphic artist, art director – Darrin Crosgrove
- Producer – Max Pepper

== Cover versions ==
"Undecided" (December 1975) was re-recorded and issued as a single by Jim Keays as lead singer of Jim Keays' Southern Cross with Peter Laffy (ex-Fox) on guitar, Ron Robinson on bass guitar and John Swan (ex-Fraternity) on drums. From 2000, he performed "Undecided" as a member of Cotton Keays & Morris alongside other former 1960s artists, Darryl Cotton and Russell Morris.
