= Buried and Dead =

Single by The Masters Apprentices

from the album The Masters Apprentices (EP) & The Masters Apprentices
- B-side: "She's My Girl"
- Released: May 1967
- Recorded: 1966
- Studio: Adelaide
- Genre: Rock
- Length: 2:37
- Label: Astor
- Songwriter(s): Michael Bower
- Producer(s): Max Pepper

The Masters Apprentices singles chronology
"Undecided" (1966)	"Buried and Dead" (1967)	"Living in a Child's Dream" (1967)

"Buried and Dead" is a song by Australian rock group, the Masters Apprentices, released in May 1967 on Astor Records as the second single from the band's debut self-titled extended play. It peaked at No. 26 on the Go-Set national singles charts.

== Background ==
In mid-1966 Adelaide-based rock group, the Masters Apprentices, shared a gig with pop star, Bobby Bright (of Melbourne duo, Bobby & Laurie), who was impressed and recommended them to his label, Astor Records. A few weeks later, they were contacted by Astor's Max Pepper, who requested a four-track demo. The band went to a local two-track studio to record it, but realised that they had only three suitable songs: "Hot Gully Wind", "Buried and Dead" and "She's My Girl".

The group relocated to Melbourne and the demo, including the newly written, "Undecided", became their debut extend play, The Masters Apprentices (February 1967).

"Buried and Dead" and "She's My Girl" were lifted from the EP and released as its second single in May, which peaked at No. 26 on the Go-Set Top 40 national singles chart and spent eight weeks in the top forty. The single also peaked in the top ten charts in most Australian capital cities. Both sides were written by the group's rhythm guitarist, Mick Bower. The band made a promotional film clip for "Buried and Dead" for TV (at their own expense), which their lead singer, Jim Keays, believed was one of the first music videos made in Australia.

== Track listing ==
No.	Title	Writer(s)	Length
1.	"Buried and Dead"	Michael Bower	2:37
2.	"She's My Girl"	Bower	2:50

== Personnel ==
The Masters Apprentices

- Mick Bower – rhythm guitar
- Jim Keays – lead vocals
- Rick Morrison – lead guitar
- Brian Vaughton – drums
- Gavin Webb – bass guitar

Recording and artwork

- Graphic artist, art director – Darrin Crosgrove
- Producer – Max Pepper
