= Doug Ford (musician) =

Australian musician

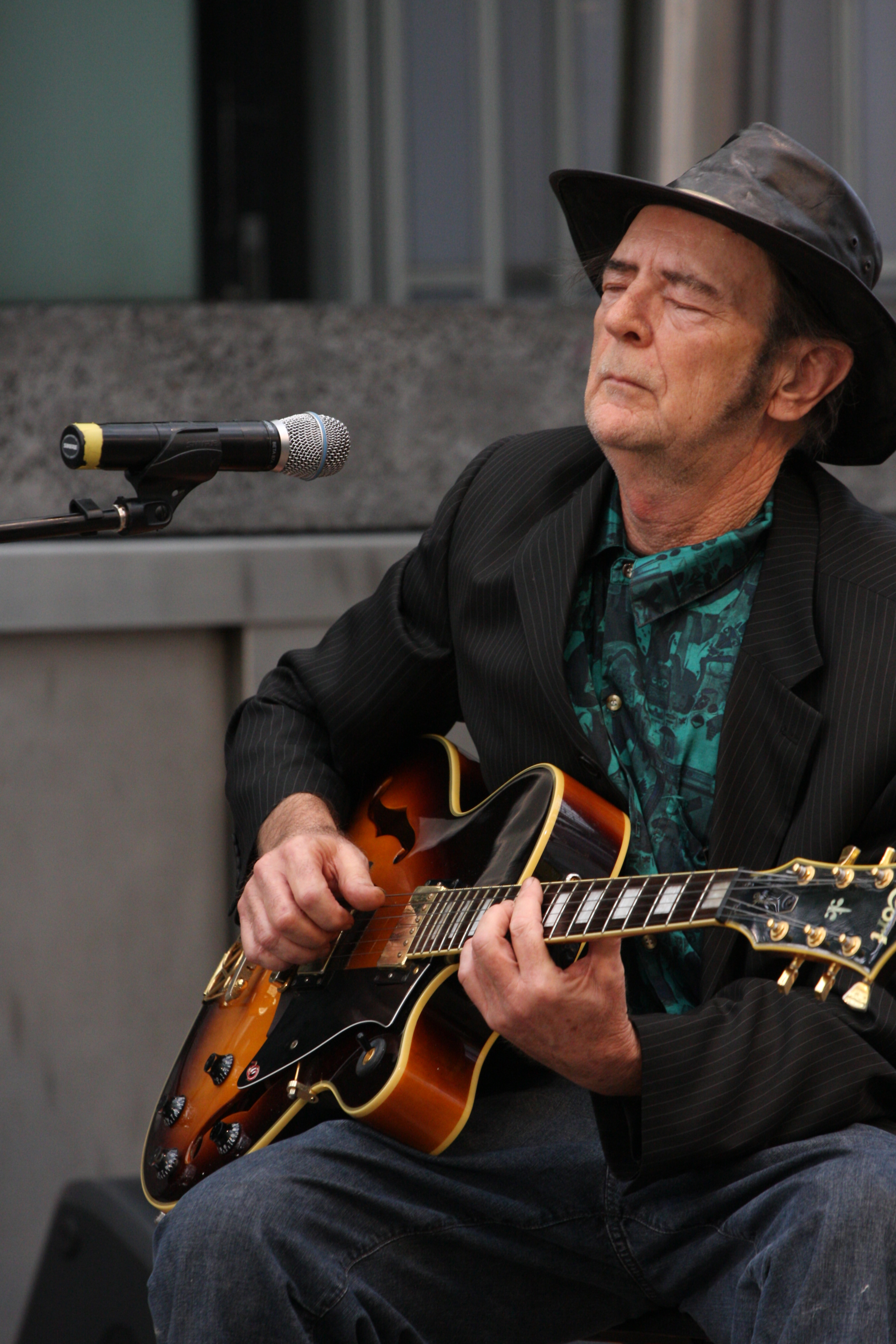
- Ford performing at the Fête de la Musique, Brisbane in June 2010

Background information
- Born: Douglas John Ford; 26 January 1945 (age 81); Casino, New South Wales, Australia
- Origin: Sydney, New South Wales, Australia
- Genres: Rock and roll; pop
- Occupations: Musician, songwriter
- Instruments: Guitar, vocals
- Years active: 1965–present
- Labels: Astor; EMI; Virgin; Gemstone; Liberation Blue
- Website: facebook.com/dougfordmusic/

Douglas John Ford (born 26 January 1945) is an Australian rock guitarist and songwriter since the mid-1960s. He was lead guitarist of rock n roll group, the Missing Links (1965–66); during 1968–72, he joined the pop-rock band, the Masters Apprentices. He established a writing partnership with that group's lead singer, Jim Keays. Ford participated in some of the reunions of the Masters Apprentices from 1988–1991, in 1997, and again briefly in 2026; the band's August 2026 concert will mark Ford's first ever performance alongside founding member Mick Bower. At the ARIA Music Awards of 1998 the group were inducted into the ARIA Hall of Fame.

== Biography ==
Douglas John Ford was born in Casino, New South Wales on 26 January 1945. In Sydney in late July 1965 Ford became the guitarist and vocalist of the second incarnation of freakbeat group the Missing Links. Fellow members were Andy Anderson on lead vocals, John Jones on guitar, Dave Longmore on vocals and guitar, Frank Kennington on vocals and Col Risby on guitar. Ford wrote "Hobo Man" for the group.

When the Missing Links disbanded in August 1966 Ford and Anderson formed the Running, Jumping, Standing Still (a.k.a. RJSS) as an R&B group in Melbourne with Rick Dalton on bass guitar (ex-The Pink Finks) and Ian Robinson on drums. According to Australian musicologist, Ian McFarlane, they "made a name for themselves as the feedback kings of the Melbourne scene, and alongside The Purple Hearts, the RJSS was one of the most exciting live acts of the day."

In March 1967 RJSS issued a cover version of Bo Diddley's "Diddy Wah Diddy" as a single on the Sunshine label. By that time the line-up was Ford with Doug Lavery on drums, Peter Newing on lead vocals and John Phillips on bass guitar. Their second single, "She's So Good to Me", appeared in August with the line-up of Ford, Burgess and Ian Ferguson on bass guitar and Mick Elliott on drums. By the end of that year the group had disbanded.

In February 1968 Ford, as lead guitarist, backing singer and songwriter, joined pop-rock band, the Masters Apprentices, which had formed in Adelaide in 1965; they relocated to Melbourne in February 1967. He established a writing partnership with the group's lead singer and founding (post-Mustangs) mainstay, Jim Keays.

Alongside Ford and Keays in the Masters Apprentices were Colin Burgess on drums and Glenn Wheatley on bass guitar. This line-up issued three top 20 singles, which were co-written by Ford and Keays: "5:10 Man" (July 1969), "Turn Up Your Radio" (April 1970) and "Because I Love You" (1971). With Ford they released three studio albums, Masterpiece (February 1970), Choice Cuts (April 1971) and A Toast to Panama Red (January 1972) before disbanding in London.

Ford and Keays co-wrote, "Quicksand" (June 1970), which was a single for Sydney-based blues, pop band, the Expression. McFarlane observed "this record ranks as one of the most astonishing hard guitar/psychedelic singles of the period." Ford wrote "Midnight Witch" (1971) for the Ash, which McFarlane noticed "combined Led Zeppelin and Jethro Tull elements" for a group that was "one of the first local bands to embrace an English-flavoured hard rock sound." Ford and Keays co-wrote, "St John's Wood" (1971), for Melbourne-based pop group, The Sect.

Ford stayed in the United Kingdom after the Masters split. He wrote and performed with various UK musicians before relocating to Spain and then Portugal for a short while. He returned to Australia in the 1980s and rejoined the Masters Apprentices for reunions from 1988 to 1991 and in 1997. At the ARIA Music Awards of 1998 the group, including Ford, were inducted into the ARIA Hall of Fame.

The group were featured on ABC-TV's six-part series, Long Way to the Top, in episode two, "Ten Pound Rocker 1963–1968", and three, "Billy Killed the Fish 1968–1973" (August 2001). They reformed for the related Long Way to the Top Tour in August–September 2002 and appeared on its associated DVD album, Long Way to the Top – Live in Concert. The classic line-up of Burgess, Ford, Keays and Wheatley reformed although Wheatley only performed for a couple of the concerts and was subbed by his son, Tim Wheatley.

"Because I Love You" has been used in a number of advertising campaigns. In the early 2000s he worked with former RJSS bandmate, Ian Ferguson (ex-Carson), as a covers duo, Ford and Ferg. They played "'Seasons of Change', 'Golden Miles', along with Masters Apprentices and Carson songs." Ford formed the Doug Ford Trio by April 2004 and started performing in Queensland.

== Awards and nominations ==
=== Go-Set Pop Poll ===
The Go-Set Pop Poll was coordinated by teen-oriented pop music newspaper, Go-Set and was established in February 1966 and conducted an annual poll during 1966 to 1972 of its readers to determine the most popular personalities.

| Year | Nominee / work | Award | Result |
|---|---|---|---|
| 1970 | himself | Best Guitarist | 1st |
| 1970 | himself | Best Composer | 2nd |
| 1971 | himself | Best Guitarist | 2nd |
| 1971 | himself | Best Songwriter / Composer | 5th |
