= The Masters Apprentices =

Australian rock band

- Also known as: The Masters, The Mustangs
- Origin: Adelaide, South Australia, Australia
- Genres: Hard rock; psychedelic rock; garage rock
- Years active: 1964–1972, 1987–1991, 1994–1995, 1997, 2001–2002, 2014–present
- Labels: Astor, Columbia, EMI, Raven, Virgin
- Members: Mick Bower; Brian Vaughton; Craig Holden; Bill Harrod; Dan Matejčić
- Past members: Jim Keays; Doug Ford; Gavin Webb; Rick Morrison; Steve Hopgood; Tony Sommers; Peter Tilbrook; Colin Burgess; Glenn Wheatley; Denny Burgess; Tim Wheatley; Rick Harrison
- Website: themastersapprentices.com

The Masters Apprentices (or The Masters to fans) are an Australian rock band originally formed as The Mustangs in 1964 in Adelaide, South Australia by Mick Bower, Brian Vaughton, Rick Morrison and Gavin Webb. They recruited singer Jim Keays and later relocated to Melbourne, Victoria, in February 1967. The band attempted to break into the United Kingdom market from 1970 before disbanding in 1972. Their popular Australian singles are "Undecided", "Living in a Child's Dream", "5:10 Man", "Think About Tomorrow Today", "Turn Up Your Radio" and "Because I Love You". The band launched the career of bass guitarist Glenn Wheatley, who later became a music industry entrepreneur and an artist talent manager for both Little River Band and John Farnham.

The band reformed periodically, including in 1987–1988 and again subsequently; they were inducted into the ARIA Hall of Fame at the ARIA Music Awards of 1998. Both Jim Keays, with His Master's Voice and Wheatley, with Paper Paradise, wrote memoirs in 1999 which included their experiences with the band. Onetime guitarist Peter Tilbrook also released the biography A Masters Apprentice, Living In The Sixties in 2015. Keays died from pneumonia related to his multiple myeloma on 13 June 2014. Wheatley died from complications of COVID-19 on 1 February 2022. As from 2020 original members Mick Bower, Brian Vaughton, Gavin Webb and Rick Harrison performed as the Masters Apprentices with Bill Harrod on bass guitar and Craig Holden (the brother of Mark Holden) on lead vocals. Bassist and founding member Gavin Webb died due to cancer on 16 April 2024, at the age of 77. Dan Matejčić replaced Rick Harrison on guitar in December 2023. In 2026, Doug Ford temporarily rejoined the Masters Apprentices for select tour dates.

== History ==
=== 1964–1965: Formation and the Mustangs ===
The Mustangs were a surf music instrumental/dance band formed in Adelaide in 1964 with Mick Bower on rhythm guitar, Rick Morrison on lead guitar, Brian Vaughton on drums and Gavin Webb on bass guitar. Initially they played covers of the Shadows and the Ventures songs. The band's output was profoundly influenced by the Australian tour of the Beatles in June 1964, which had a particular impact in Adelaide due to recent migrants from the United Kingdom. When the Beatles arrived in Adelaide they were greeted by the largest crowd ever seen in their touring career—estimates as high as 300,000 while Adelaide's population being about 668,000 nearly half of the city had turned out to greet them (see The Beatles' influence on popular culture). Following the Beatles' chart breakthrough and tour, the Mustangs changed style and took on a lead singer, Scottish immigrant, Jim Keays. The Mustangs rehearsed regularly in a shed behind the King’s Head hotel owned by Vaughton's family. Their original manager, Graham Longley, made a tape recording of a rehearsal; it was rediscovered and released on CD in 2004 as Mustangs to Masters ... First Year Apprentices. After Keays joined on lead vocals, the band produced more original songs in the beat style.

The Mustangs established themselves on the thriving Adelaide dance circuit by playing in suburban halls and migrant hostels. They built a following with local teenagers, including migrants from the UK, which were an early influence on the band as they were directly in touch with current mod fashions, not as widely known in Australia.

=== 1965–1967: Adelaide years ===
In late 1965, the Mustangs renamed themselves as "The Masters Apprentices" (deliberately omitting the apostrophe). Bower supplied the name because "we are apprentices to the masters of the blues—Chuck Berry, Bo Diddley, Jimmy Reed, Elmore James and Robert Johnson". By early 1966 they were one of the most popular beat bands in Adelaide, regularly selling out concerts in the city, as well as making visits to outlying towns of Murray Bridge, Mount Gambier and Whyalla. Their first TV appearance, on Good Friday, was on a Channel 7 telethon hosted by Adelaide TV celebrity Ernie Sigley. They entered the South Australian heat of Hoadley's Battle of the Sounds and finished third behind the Twilights (eventual national winners).

Later in 1966, the Masters Apprentices shared a gig with pop star Bobby Bright of Melbourne duo Bobby & Laurie, who was impressed and recommended them to his label, Astor Records. A few weeks later, they were contacted by Astor, which requested a four-track demo. The band went to a local two-track studio to record it, but realised that they had only three suitable songs to record. Needing a fourth track, guitarists Bower and Morrison wrote a new song, "Undecided", in about 15 minutes; the backing track was cut in about the same time. The title came from the fact that they were undecided about a name for the song when quizzed by the studio owner, Max Pepper. The biting fuzz-tone of Bower's guitar on the track was a fortunate accident; it was caused by a malfunctioning valve in his amplifier, but the group liked the sound and kept the faulty valve in until after the session.

In August 1966, the band made their first visit to Melbourne. They made a strong impression with showcase performances at the city's leading discotheques. Their debut single, "Undecided" / "Wars or Hands of Time", was released in October and gradually climbed the Adelaide charts thanks to strong support from local DJs.

"Wars or Hands of Time", written by Bower, is the first Australian pop song to directly address the issue of the Vietnam War, which was now affecting the lives of many young Australians because of the controversial introduction of conscription in 1965. 20-year-old Keays was one of hundreds of potential conscripts whose birthday (9 September) was picked in a 1966 ballot. He was able to legally avoid the draft by signing with the Citizens Military Force (CMF, later renamed the Army Reserve) and eluded a "short back and sides" haircut with the aid of his girlfriend, who pinned his long hair up under his slouch hat whenever he attended CMF sessions.

During their second trip to Melbourne in late 1966, local radio DJ, Stan Rofe, had picked up "Undecided" and was playing it regularly, their raw sound and wild stage act led him to state:

The Masters are to Australia what the Rolling Stones are to England, and The Doors are to America

— Stan Rofe, quoted in Molly Meldrum presents 50 years of rock in Australia.

Rofe, also a columnist with pop magazine, Go-Set, championed many Australian acts during the 1950s, 1960s and 1970s. The band promoted "Undecided" on Melbourne TV series, Kommotion, where members met Ian Meldrum who mimed to "Winchester Cathedral", Meldrum was also a staff writer for Go-Set and was later a record producer, host of the influential TV pop show Countdown and a music commentator.

Returning to Adelaide, the band recorded more original songs, including Bower's "Buried and Dead", which became their second single, plus other tracks which were later on their debut LP album. The success of the second trip made it obvious that they should turn professional and relocate to Melbourne. This led to the departure of original manager Longley and drummer Vaughton, both deciding to remain in Adelaide.

=== 1967: Melbourne and debut album ===
The Masters Apprentices relocated to Melbourne in February 1967. Vaughton, who remained in Adelaide, was replaced on drums by Steve Hopgood. "Undecided" raced up the Melbourne charts to peak at No. 9 locally. Go-Set had published national singles charts since October 1966, and "Undecided" peaked at No. 13 in April. The group became established as one of Melbourne's top attractions, performing regularly at discos like Catcher, Sebastians, the Thumpin' Tum and the Biting Eye and at a multitude of suburban dances. Despite such popularity, they led a hand-to-mouth existence for the first year or so in Melbourne, often relying on the hospitality of fans and friends.

In May 1967, "Buried and Dead" was released as their second single, and the band made a promotional film clip for TV (at their own expense), which is believed to be one of the first pop music videos made in Australia. They also undertook their first trip to Sydney, where they made a live appearance on the TCN-9 pop show Saturday Date, where they were chased by fans on their way to the studio and had their clothes partly ripped before appearing.

In June 1967, Astor released the group's self-titled debut LP, The Masters Apprentices (also styled as The Master's Apprentices), featuring earlier singles, several originals written by Bower, a cover of Bo Diddley's "Dancing Girl" and the Beatles' "I Feel Fine".

By 1967, the group assimilated influences from the burgeoning psychedelic scene; Keays maintains that it wasn't until some time after that they began to experiment with the drug LSD. Nevertheless, their next single, Bower's "Living in a Child's Dream", is regarded as an early example of Australian psychedelic rock and one of their greatest pop songs. It was recorded at the newly opened Armstrong's Studios in South Melbourne and like all their Astor cuts it was nominally produced by staff producer Dick Heming. According to Keays, Heming's input was limited and most of the production was by engineer Roger Savage with considerable input from Ian Meldrum. Released in August 1967, at the peak of the Summer of Love, it reached Top Ten in most Australian capitals and peaked at No. 9 on Go-Set's Top 40. Both "Living in a Child's Dream" and "Undecided" ranked in the Top 5 Australian singles of 1967, and "Living in a Child's Dream" was voted Australian Song of the Year by Go-Set readers.

The success of the new single elevated the band as teen idols, but as pressures mounted lead guitarist Rick Morrison was forced to quit after passing out on stage during a concert in June 1967, suffering a collapsed lung. He was ordered to give up performing and was replaced by Tony Summers (ex-Johnny Young's Kompany). Meanwhile concerts and tours continued, with the group playing up to fifteen shows per week. A tour of New South Wales in July included some of the last pop shows staged at the Sydney Stadium on 30 July, and at Sydney Trocadero ballroom (both later demolished). Also in July, they made it to the national finals of Hoadley's Battle of the Sounds, representing South Australia, finishing second to Melbourne's The Groop.

In September 1967, while touring Tasmania, the shy and sensitive Bower was found in his room in extreme distress, the promoter insisting they had to perform; faced with the prospect of going unpaid and being stranded in Hobart, they complied. Bower was dressed, taken to the concert and pushed on stage with his guitar around his neck; he stood motionless through the gig, arms hanging limp, and was hospitalised immediately after, suffering a severe nervous breakdown, and was ordered to give up performing. He was sent home to Adelaide to recuperate, and only returned to live performance in the late 1970s.

The loss of Bower was a blow for the band. Bower was central to their success, having written (or co-written) all their singles and all original tracks on their debut album. His forced departure left the group floundering, and they continued with de facto leadership passing to Keays. At the end of September, Keays and Webb chose Bower's replacement, guitarist Rick Harrison (ex-The Others) from Adelaide.

On 14 October 1967, the band played a free concert in Sydney's Hyde Park, as part of the Waratah Spring Festival. An estimated 50,000 fans packed into the park, but after only a few songs the concert degenerated into a riot. When the crowd surge threatened to crush audience members and topple the makeshift stage, police were forced to close the concert. Escaping band members were pursued by fans towards Kings Cross. That same evening, still dazed by the afternoon's events, they headlined the Living in a Child's Dream Ball, organised by University of NSW students. Keays later described the event:

The ball itself was a psychedelic experience of the highest order. Because of its theme, everyone was dressed as a schoolgirl or boy, some licking lollipops and others playing with yo-yos. There were people frolicking in huge cages filled with Minties and Jaffas and everyone seemed suitably spaced. The band was taken backstage, whereupon we climbed into a giant die which had been specially constructed. The die was then wheeled out on a cue from the stage manager and pushed through the audience up to the stage. At this point the lid of the die flew open and up we popped. Someone from the university then presented me with the key, to thunderous applause by the vast crowd, and we jumped out, slung on our guitars and blasted into the most acid-inspired sounds we could muster. The audience went out of their minds – probably because most of them already were – and pandemonium broke out when we ended the set with "Living in a Child's Dream". The psychedelic light show was as magnificent as had been seen anywhere in the country, with 'trippy' oil lights, the first mirror balls I'd ever seen, smoke machines and the full range of state-of-the-art psychedelia.

— Jim Keays, 1999, His Master's Voice

Newest member, Harrison quit immediately after these concerts and upon returning to Melbourne they recruited another lead guitarist, Peter Tilbrook from Adelaide band, The Bentbeaks. That band had released a single "Caught Red Handed", which had been banned by Melbourne radio in March for alleged obscenity. Not long after, Keays tried LSD for the first time. With Astor pressing for a new single, the band turned to their friend Brian Cadd of The Groop, who had already written a number of songs for his own band and for other artists, including Johnny Farnham. Cadd presented them with "Silver People", co-written with The Groop's Max Ross, which was re-titled as "Elevator Driver" and released in February 1968 as their fourth single.

As 1967 ended the band's career reached a critical juncture. They still had no songwriter, and both drummer Steve Hopgood and lead guitarist Tony Sommers were becoming disenchanted with the band's erratic fortunes. Keays decided to replace them and also their second manager, Tony Dickstein. In Sydney, Keays met two brothers, bass guitarist and singer Denny Burgess (ex-The Throb), and drummer Colin Burgess, both had played in a support band, The Haze, at a gig in suburban Ashfield. Keays was impressed and considered them for possible new members.

=== 1968: Choice Cuts line-up forms ===
In January 1968, Keays reorganised the band with Summers and Hopgood departing, and Colin Burgess being flown to Melbourne as the new drummer. Keays then approached Doug Ford, an innovative electric guitarist from the second line-up of Sydney garage rock band The Missing Links and its offshoot Running Jumping Standing Still. The new recruits revitalised the band's career. Ford was a strong songwriter, a good singer and an accomplished electric guitarist who brought a new depth to the band's sound. He and Keays began working as a writing team. Ford's arrival filled the gap left by Bowers' departure and made possible their transition from pop band to rock group. "Elevator Driver"—written for them by Brian Cadd of The Groop—was released in February, accompanied by another film clip and a full-colour promotional poster. The band had to pay for these as Astor Records refused to pay for 'extravagant' promotional items. "Elevator Driver" provided them with a Top 30 hit, and kept the momentum going as they rebuilt the band. In March 1968, Webb married Suzette Belle, President of the Beatles Australian Fan Club.

In April 1968, bassist Gavin Webb—last of original line-up of The Mustangs—was forced to quit, suffering from stomach ulcers. Keays first choice for bass guitar was Beeb Birtles of Adelaide band Zoot and later of Little River Band but Birtles declined. On the flight home, Keays found himself seated next to artist manager Darryl Sambell, who was then enjoying the success of his protégé Johnny Farnham with his No. 1 hit single, "Sadie (The Cleaning Lady)". Keays and the flamboyant Sambell hit it off, and Sambell took over the band's management, which was a mixed blessing: he was a master networker and had a flair for getting publicity; he was also a partner in the newly formed AMBO booking agency, which proved helpful for concert bookings; but in the long run Sambell was more interested in Farnham's career and the day-to-day management duties gradually fell to band members. Sambell's pop tastes were also at odds with the developing progressive direction of the band's music.

Glenn Wheatley (from Brisbane's blues group Bay City Union) joined on guitar just after Webb had left and Tilbrook switched to bass guitar. Upon Sambell's advice, they decided not to renew their contract with Astor and negotiated a new contract with EMI. Their next single, "Brigette"—released in June 1968 was their last recording for Astor—marked the debut of the Ford/Keays writing partnership. It was inspired by Donovan's "Mellow Yellow" and bears a resemblance to some of The Move's earlier singles. The quasi-baroque arrangement included a string section scored by The Strangers' John Farrar, and also took them into the Top 40.

In 1968, they topped the annual Go-Set Pop Poll as 'Most Original Group', and they came second to The Twilights as 'Most Popular Australian Group'. They entered the South Australian heats of the 1968 Hoadley's Battle of the Sounds, beating local rivals Zoot in a tense contest. They were runners-up in the national final, held in Melbourne in July, with The Groove winning and Doug Parkinson in Focus coming third. After the Hoadleys final, the manager of co-sponsor Sitmar cruise line, who had voted for them, offered the band a working trip to UK, with free passage in exchange for performances.

Keays was interviewed by Go-Set staff reporter, Lily Brett and the 'expose' was printed on 17 July 1968, headlined "Sex is thrust upon us", the article and its follow-up, "Whose breasts are best?", revealed aspects of the bacchanalian groupie scene:

many girls are potential band molls [...] About 20 girls a day come to our house. On Sunday, it averages 50. I'll give you a typical example of what happens. Last week a girl walked in and said, 'Right, boys who's going to make love to me first?' She used a rather more obscene expression than 'make love' [...] And only recently we were in a Victorian country town when five girls aged between 15 and 18 somehow got into our hotel room. They didn't say a word. They took their clothes off and said: 'Will you judge and see which one of us has got the best breasts?'

— Jim Keays, July 1968, Go-Set interviews by Lily Brett, quoted in Molly Meldrum presents 50 years of rock in Australia

The 'bad-boy' publicity also frustrated Sambell's plans to market them as a wholesome teen combo. Keays stated that there was a backlash from the interview, the roadway outside Keays' flat in East St Kilda was daubed with the slogan "Band Moll's Paradise" in 3-foot-high (0.91 m) letters, threats of physical beatings from male audience members and the press claiming they were "sex maniacs".

Live performances continued and in the second half of 1968 they went back into Armstrong's Studios to record their first single for EMI, although this was not released until early 1969. Meanwhile, Astor released "But One Day", an old track from their debut LP, as a single in August 1968, but the band urged fans not to buy it and it failed to chart. The band played hundreds of concerts during the year, touring around country Australia, visiting interstate capitals and dashing between dance venues around greater Melbourne. By this stage, Wheatley had taken on much of their day-to-day management. Their schedule was punishing—typically they would play three shows a night on Fridays and Saturdays at an average of about 45 minutes per gig, and often went to the Channel 0 TV studios on Saturday mornings for appearances on the leading pop show of the day, Uptight!.

In December 1968, Tilbrook left the band, so Wheatley moved to bass guitar. Soon after, Wheatley found a message from the cruise line Sitmar and returned the call, only to be roundly abused by Sitmar's furious entertainment manager; he then discovered that Sitmar had offered the band work on a London-bound cruise liner, which had left the previous week, while the band had been in Brisbane. Unable to locate them, the liner had been delayed for an entire day while Sitmar found a group to replace them. The band confronted Sambell, who denied any knowledge, but a further check with Sitmar confirmed that the deal had been arranged, but that Sambell had been caught up with Farnham's affairs and had forgotten to tell them about it.

By the end of the year, finances and morale were low; despite constant performing, they were heavily in debt, and tensions within the group were nearing breaking point. By the end of the year, friction between the group and Sambell had become intolerable. Their final show of the year was on New Year's Eve, and between sets the band members talked through their problems, patched up their differences, and agreed that Sambell had to go. Wheatley offered to take on their day-to-day bookings and promotion work, leaving Ford and Keays free to concentrate on writing.

=== 1969: From pop to rock ===
1969 began with The Masters Apprentices settling their new line-up and the Ford/Keays writing team finding its stride, the band moved to its most remembered and successful phase. The long-awaited first EMI single was moderately successful, and even though it was something of a false start artistically, "Linda Linda" / "Merry-Go-Round", released in March 1969 marked the beginning of a short collaboration with New Zealand-born producer Howard Gable. The bubblegum pop A-side, "Linda Linda" fell into the faux-music hall category; but the rocky B-side showed hints of how the group was developing. The single gained radio airplay and helped to revive their waning popularity.

The band continued to tour across the country which helped weld them into a close-knit unit. Meanwhile articles, profiles, pinups and TV appearances proliferated; indeed they were overexposed, Keays claims, so they began to turn down TV appearances for fear of becoming too familiar. When they played at the annual Moomba concert in March at the Myer Music Bowl, they drew a crowd of just under 200,000 people, second only to The Seekers' record-breaking appearance there two years earlier. Their next single, the rocky "5:10 Man", released in July 1969, which peaked at No. 16 on the Go-Set Singles Chart and initiated a string of Top 20 hits. It was a deliberate move towards a heavier sound, as the band were keen to move away from the current bubblegum craze that their manager and producer wanted.

Also in July, with "5:10 Man" climbing the charts, they had their next attempt at the Hoadley's Battle of the Sounds, and once again they were runners-up—although this time they ran such a close second to Doug Parkinson in Focus that they were also offered the same prize, a trip to UK with the Sitmar line. According to Keays, his band won on points but the judges felt their 'bad boy' image did not make them suitable for first.

In August 1969, the band headed off on the Operation Starlift Tour, an all-Australian concert series, which featured: The Masters Apprentices, Johnny Farnham, Ronnie Burns, Russell Morris, Johnny Young, Zoot, and The Valentines. Although the tour was apparently a financial disaster, it was a promotional success for the band. The Brisbane Festival Hall concert was a highpoint of the tour and they drew a record crowd there, breaking The Beatles' 1964 attendance record. Wheatley was dragged offstage by the audience and had his pants and coat literally torn to shreds, with the result that one of the police on hand threatened to arrest him for indecent exposure if they did not finish playing immediately.

After the Brisbane show, Wheatley calculated that the crowd had paid $5 per ticket—so box-office gross must have been at least $30,000–$35,000—yet his band, like all other acts, were on a fixed fee. They received $200 for the concert, and the top-billed act, Farnham, was paid about $1,000. Wheatley realised that the promoters had pocketed the lion's share of the takings. As a result, the group decided to manage and book themselves and over the closing months of 1969 Wheatley became more involved in choosing venues, booking shows and promoting the group with care to avoid over-exposure, cutting down on appearances and increasing their fee. They closed the year with the bluesy single "Think About Tomorrow Today", which provided another Top 20 hit nationally and went to No. 11 in Melbourne. It was later used by the Bank of New South Wales in its youth-oriented TV ads. According to the Australian music website MILESAGO,

According to the Australian music website MILESAGO, in the late 1960s, the band "switched to wearing leather stage outfits. This nicely enhanced the 'bad-boy' image, of course, but as they discovered, it had a much more practical side-effect. The cost of buying expensive stage clothes which were being shredded on a nightly basis was sending them broke, and of course leather—which didn't tear—provided then with their longest-wearing outfits in years. Jim Keays reckons it saved them thousands of dollars."

=== 1970: Masterpiece and United Kingdom first year ===
Early in 1970, the band officially parted with Sambell and set up their own booking agency, Drum. Based in a terrace house office in Drummond St Carlton, Drum began by handling the band's own management but within a few months it was also booking and promoting gigs for The Sect, Ash, Lovers Dream, Big Daddies, Thursday's Children, Looking Glass, Daisy Clover, Nova Express, Company Caine, Plastic Tears, Little Stevie, Tamam Shud, Jeff St John, The Flying Circus and fourteen other acts, as well as promoting tours by overseas acts The Four Tops and Paul Jones (ex-Manfred Mann).

The Masters Apprentices had been stockpiling tracks since they signed with EMI, in February their long delayed second LP Masterpiece was released. Although something of a hodgepodge—as Keays freely admits—it showed the band developing a much broader range. It included the singles "Linda Linda" and "5:10 Man" and album tracks, "A Dog, a Siren & Memories", and "How I Love You", although it omitted the song "Merry-Go-Round". By then they were coming to grips with the album format and emulated the current fad for concept albums by linking the songs with a short guitar-and-string arrangement, crossfaded between tracks. The title track, a live recording, provides a vivid aural snapshot of their live show during 1968, complete with the deafening screams of fans. The album also includes their own version of "St John's Wood", a track Ford and Keays wrote for Brisbane band The Sect, who had released it as a single on Columbia during the year.

In April 1970, EMI released, "Turn Up Your Radio", produced by Gable, and engineered by John Sayers. It was recorded at a late-night session and Keays later recounted that he was so drunk when he recorded his vocals that he had to be held up to the microphone. The song was deliberately designed to be loud and offensive, and was intended as the final nail in the coffin to their ill-conceived teenybopper image. It was released just before the start of the 1970 radio ban—a major dispute between commercial radio stations and record companies—which resulted in the banning of many major-label releases. Despite little commercial radio airplay, the song raced up the charts and peaked at No. 7 nationally.

Since receiving their prize in the Hoadley's Battle of the Sounds in mid-1969, The Masters Apprentices were set on breaking into the UK market. They worked to save money for the effort with a national farewell tour in April–May. On 25 May 1970, they boarded the Fairsky for UK, their agency business was left in the hands of Adrian Barker. They were given a send-off by a crowd of fans and friends including Rofe, Sambell, Meldrum, Ross D. Wyllie, Johnny Young and Ronnie Burns. The six-week ocean voyage provided a break after years of constant gigging. Without the pressure and distraction of touring, they wrote and rehearsed new material. Arriving in English in July, the band entered a productive period, where they continued to write and rehearse, and made contact with other Aussie expatriates. Freed from constant performing, they immersed themselves in the cultural life of London, going on shopping sprees for clothes in Kings Road, Chelsea, ploughing through scores of new records and doing the rounds of clubs and concerts, seeing the best music on offer. Wheatley continued work on a manuscript he had begun on the ocean voyage, "Who the Hell is Judy in Sydney?", which recounted his experiences with the group. His memoirs were too hot for publishers at the time and were not printed until decades later when they became the basis for his autobiography Paper Paradise.

Wheatley contacted EMI in London and met with Trudy Green, secretary to staff producer Jeff Jarratt. She liked the Australian band and got Jarratt interested, he agreed to produce them. EMI Australia agreed to pay for the album's recording, with EMI UK providing the artwork; the group were thrilled to record at the legendary Abbey Road Studios with Jarratt and engineer Peter Brown.

Just before the start of recording, Keays made a trip to mainland Europe, and was in Copenhagen when he heard of the death of Jimi Hendrix, one of his idols. Back in London, Ford and Keays penned "Song for a Lost Gypsy", which they added to their songlist. The band entered the studio in September to record Choice Cuts. The staff and facilities were superior to those in Australia, which allowed a greater range of expression. The songs they brought to the sessions—many written during the voyage—were original and distinctive, distilling their recent musical influences. This included the heavier sounds of Hendrix, King Crimson and Free, as well as the acoustic styles of Donovan, the Small Faces and Van Morrison. They brought in outside musicians to augment some tracks, and made use of Paul McCartney's white grand piano on a few cuts, including "Because I Love You". Towards the end of recording, they found themselves one song short of the optimum LP length, so at Jarratt's suggestion they wrote a new song, built up from a Latin-flavoured instrumental shuffle that Ford had been playing with. Keays wrote lyrics for the piece overnight, they cut it the next day and it became the album's opening track "Rio de Camero".

The entire LP was recorded, mixed and mastered within a month. The choice of the first single was, "Because I Love You", a song of love, separation and independence, and became a popular and enduring recording. To promote it, they used Australian film-maker Timothy Fisher to make a music video. The simple but effective clip was filmed on a chilly autumn morning on Hampstead Heath. Black-and-white prints were shown many times on Australian TV, where colour was not introduced until 1975, but it was shot in colour, as were several other clips for tracks from the LP.

The album's cover depicts an elegant, overstuffed chair in a panelled room, with a mysterious disembodied hand holding a cigarette floating above it. It was from the English design group Hipgnosis, who were responsible for covers for Pink Floyd, 10cc and Led Zeppelin. Despite the prospects for their new LP, the band were caught by surprise after its completion when Wheatley revealed they were almost broke. They were determined to stay in London but desperately needed funds. A phone call to EMI Australia for financial assistance proved futile, so they planned an Australian tour. Wheatley headed home to organise it and secured a local soft drink company as a sponsor. The band returned to Australia at the end of December, just as "Because I Love You" was released. It was their fourth consecutive Top 20 hit, reaching No. 12 nationally, and became one of the key songs of the new era of Australian rock.

=== 1971: Choice Cuts, Australian tour and Nickelodeon ===
The Masters Apprentices began their national tour in Perth in January 1971. Howard Gable joined them with portable four-track equipment and recorded their first show at the Nickelodeon Theatre. The band was tired and under-rehearsed, and were not satisfied with the results, these recordings became the live LP Nickelodeon, believed to be the second live rock album recorded in Australia. Two of its tracks were released as singles in June 1971.

In their absence the band had been voted top group in the 1970 Go-Set Pop Poll, and both their 1970 singles had been hits. Nevertheless, the band and the music scene had changed by 1971, at first they struggled to regain their previous popularity. A breakthrough gig at Chequers in Sydney allowed the tour to gain momentum, helped by a lengthy profile in the magazine POL, written by freelance journalist Howard Lindley. Lindley became an ardent supporter and started work on a film about the band: he shot several performances in the weeks before they returned to UK, but the project foundered when Lindley committed suicide, only fragments of his material survived.

While touring Australia in February 1971, the group released "I'm Your Satisfier". In April 1971, Choice Cuts was released in Australia to widespread acclaim, reaching #11 on the Go-Set Top 20 Album Charts. They made numerous TV appearances, including a three-song live set for the ABC's GTK which included a live-in-the-studio performance of "Future of Our Nation". In Melbourne they played a concert at the Town Hall, supported by Billy Thorpe & The Aztecs. Choice Cuts was released in the UK it was well received by critics. In May 1971, John Halsall called from London to inform them that Choice Cuts was receiving glowing notices in the English music press, including a rave review in Melody Maker. He told them it was selling well in UK and starting to make an impression in Europe—the track "I'm Your Satisfier" had been released in France and had gone into the Top 10 there. Halsall urged them to return to London as soon as possible and that they would be able to record a new album there, so they organised their return and EMI agreed to finance another LP when they got to London.

By the time they arrived in the UK, almost three months had passed since Halsall's phone call and interest was waning. At this point a new UK label Bronze—who had just signed Slade and Uriah Heep—made an approach to the band. Although the group was hesitant, being still signed to EMI, they decided to use the offer as leverage in hopes of getting a better deal out of EMI. Wheatley delivered an ultimatum to EMI Australia, demanding that they either release the band from their contract or match Bronze's offer of £90,000 (or $180,000 in Australia). EMI did neither, responding with an advance of $1,000. Fearing legal repercussions, the band declined Bronze's offer. Keays' later opined that the best course of action would have been to "sign with Bronze and let the lawyers work it all out later."

=== 1971–1972: A Toast to Panama Red ===
Returning to Abbey Road in September 1971, the band were reunited with Jarratt and Brown plus engineer (and Sgt. Pepper's Lonely Hearts Club Band veteran) Richard Lush. Most of the new album was recorded in Studio Two at the same time that John Lennon was making his John Lennon/Plastic Ono Band album in Studio One.

According to Wheatley, one of the Masters Apprentices' tracks, "Games We Play", was recorded at George Martin's Air Studios, with Martin himself conducting the children's choir which features on the second part of the track. The album was titled A Toast to Panama Red, in homage to the Central American variety of marijuana. The album was lauded as one of the best Australian progressive releases, but it was largely ignored at the time. Sales were hindered by the lurid cover, which even Keays later admitted was not an ideal choice, being as garish as Choice Cuts was tasteful. Designed and painted by Keays, it was evidently a dig at the UK and featured a grotesque psychedelic caricature of a bulldog's head wearing a Union Jack eye patch, its ears are skewered by an arrow from which dangles a tag emblazoned with the album's title.

The band played sporadic shows to support the album, which was well-reviewed in UK, but EMI Australia did little to promote them. Although Keays' recollections are more positive, Wheatley's own account of the album sessions is that they were an unhappy experience for him. He had a bad LSD trip the night before they went into the studio and began the recording in a negative frame of mind. Tensions mounted steadily during the recording and Wheatley did not play on some of the tracks, with his parts covered by Ford. According to Keays, Wheatley had been working part-time at a management agency over the previous few months and had insufficient time to rehearse because of his day job.

In January 1972, EMI released A Toast to Panama Red and in February they released the single "Love Is", which had been recorded using a twelve-string acoustic specially loaned to Ford for the occasion by one of his heroes, The Shadows' Hank B. Marvin. The classic line-up's last recording was the album's delicate and poignant closing track, "Thyme To Rhyme". According to Ian McFarlane in his Encyclopedia of Australian Rock and Pop the album, A Toast to Panama Red is "one of the great lost treasures of the Australian progressive rock era".

Wheatley tried to convince the rest of the band that they should break up but they disagreed, so he announced he was leaving to work full-time for the management agency. Soon after, Keays announced his own departure and intention to return to Australia immediately. Ford and Burgess decided to keep going and they sent for Burgess' brother Denny, who took over on bass guitar. The final trio line-up soldiered on for a few months, and made one recording, "Freedom Seekers" before finally splitting in mid-1972.

Returning to Australia, Keays undertook some final promotional duties for the "Love Is" single, including a TV appearance in which he performed alone, playing 12-string guitar. He then set about establishing himself as a solo artist, began composing songs, and also wrote for Go-Set magazine.

=== 1973–1986: Post-breakup ===
In March 1973, Keays played the role of 'The Lover' in the Australian version of The Who's rock opera, Tommy. In 1974, he compiled tracks from the band's latter career and designed the cover for the collection, entitled Now That's It's Over, with liner notes written by Howard Lindley. EMI released "Rio de Camero" / "Thyme to Rhyme" as a single in August 1974, the A-side garnered reasonable airplay but did not chart. In late 1974 Keays embarked on his ambitious concept LP, Boy from the Stars, which was premiered at the final Sunbury Pop Festival in January 1975, where his all-star backing group was joined by Wheatley, recently returned from the UK, in their last performance together for over ten years. Keays continued his solo musical career, fronting Southern Cross, and from 2000 he has toured as a member of Cotton Keays & Morris with 1960s artists Darryl Cotton from Adelaide's Zoot and Russell Morris from Melbourne's Somebody's Image.

Wheatley moved into a career in management, applying lessons learned and contacts made with his band to managing other bands. He spent several years in UK and America, on the eve of his return to Australia at the end of 1974, he was invited to manage the reformed version of Australian harmony-rock band Mississippi, after a name change to Little River Band they set about cracking the American market and Wheatley was instrumental guiding them to their historic American commercial breakthrough in 1976–1977. From 1980 Wheatley also managed John Farnham and oversaw his career revival, initially as a solo artist and then as a member of Little River Band, eventually mortgaging his own house to finance Farnham's hugely successful solo album Whispering Jack in 1986. Under Wheatley's guidance, Farnham staged a spectacular comeback as an adult pop artist when Whispering Jack became the biggest-selling locally produced album in Australian recording history.

In the early 1980s, there was a revival of interest in The Masters Apprentices due partly to rock historian Glenn A. Baker, who featured the band for his Rock & Roll Trivia Show on Sydney radio's Triple J, which in turn led to the release of a definitive compilation LP, Hands of Time, by Baker's Raven Records in 1981.

=== 1987–present: Reunions and halls of fame ===
The classic Burgess, Ford, Keays and Wheatley line-up reunited in August 1987 for a "Back to the 1960s" special on the popular TV variety show Hey Hey It's Saturday. It marked the first time all four had played together since Wheatley had left in late 1971. They undertook a reunion tour during 1988 and released an album, Do What You Wanna Do, featuring new material and new versions of their earlier songs. "Because I Love You" also gained new prominence around that time via its use in a series of advertisements for a well-known brand of jeans; the revamped version of "Because I Love You" peaked at No. 30 on the ARIA Charts.

The group minus Wheatley (who only participated in the TV reunion and a few early gigs) undertook occasional reunion concerts and in September 1995 released a new version of "Turn Up Your Radio" recorded with Hoodoo Gurus.

At the ARIA Music Awards of 1998, the Masters Apprentices received formal recognition for their achievements when they were inducted into the ARIA Hall of Fame. The same year they were also honoured in Australia Post's "Rock & Roll" series with a stamp commemorating "Turn Up Your Radio".

In November 1998, Colin and Denny Burgess narrowly escaped death after the car in which they were travelling was struck by a semi-trailer. Both were severely injured—Colin suffered multiple fractures and internal injuries and as a result could not be moved from the wreck for some time. Denny also received serious injuries and had to undergo plastic surgery. Both made a recovery and were the subject of a critically acclaimed documentary.

In 1999, Ford, Keays and Wheatley reunited in Melbourne to perform 'unplugged' at the launch of Keays' memoirs, His Master's Voice: The Masters Apprentices: The bad boys of sixties rock 'n' roll, in which he stated that he would not initiate any further reunions. Wheatley's own memoirs, Paper paradise: confessions of a rock 'n' roll survivor, was released later in the year. At the same times, all of The Masters Apprentices' original albums were re-released and remastered on CD.

In June 2000, ABC-TV screened an edited version of the documentary Turn Up Your Video, which was accompanied by the release of the full-length home video.

Despite Keays' earlier announcement, the band reunited on subsequent occasions including the Gimme Ted benefit concert on 9 March 2001, and the Long Way to the Top national concert tour during August–September 2002, which featured a host of the best Australian acts of the 1950s, 1960s and 1970s. The tour was inspired by the ABC-TV series Long Way to the Top broadcast in August 2001. Keays featured on "Episode 2: Ten Pound Rocker 1963–1968" where he discussed the UK migrant influence on their early work and "Undecided"; and in "Episode 3:Billy Killed the Fish 1968–1973" where he described pioneering pub rock and the band's groupies. The classic line-up of Burgess, Ford, Keays and Wheatley reformed although Wheatley only performed for a couple of the concerts and was subbed by his son, Tim Wheatley. Performances of "Because I Love You" and "Turn Up Your Radio" at the final Sydney concert, as well as an interview with promoter Amanda Pelman, feature on the associated DVD, Long Way to the Top: Live in Concert, released in 2002. They also appeared at the 9 October 2005 benefit concert in Melbourne for former Rose Tattoo guitarist Lobby Loyde. Another performance was at the 2005 clipsal 500, along with Hoodoo Gurus.

In October 2010, their 1967 debut album, Master's Apprentices, was listed in the top 40 in the book, 100 Best Australian Albums.

Keays died from pneumonia related to multiple myeloma on 13 June 2014.

The original line-up reunited in 2014 for the band's induction into the South Australian Music Hall of Fame. Founding members Mick Bower, Brian Vaughton, Rick Morrison and Gavin Webb returned to the stage, with Craig Holden stepping in on vocals following Jim Keays' death just weeks earlier. Performing songs from across the band's career, the reunion marked the beginning of a new chapter in the history of The Masters Apprentices.

Following the reunion, the band resumed regular live performances with founding members Mick Bower, Brian Vaughton and Gavin Webb, joined by vocalist Craig Holden, bassist Bill Harrod and guitarist Dan Matejcic. 1960s member Rick Harrison also joined the group from 2017 till 2023. The continuing success of the reformed group saw sold-out concerts, appearances at the Adelaide Fringe, major theatre performances and festival appearances across Australia, introducing the band's music to new generations while reconnecting with longtime fans.

Founding bassist Gavin Webb died on 16 April 2024 after living with cancer for six years. The band continued under the leadership of founding members Mick Bower and Brian Vaughton and, in 2026, announced that former guitarist Doug Ford would rejoin for select performances, bringing together musicians from both the founding and later line-ups. More than sixty years after its formation in Adelaide, The Masters Apprentices remains active, with Bower and Vaughton continuing to perform as the band's longest-serving members and preserving the legacy of one of Australia's pioneering rock groups.

== Legacy ==
The Masters Apprentices continued under various line-ups from 1965 until 1972, reforming briefly in 1987 and on several subsequent occasions. Following the reunion of the original line-up in June 2014, the band entered a new chapter, continuing to perform with founding members Mick Bower, Brian Vaughton and Gavin Webb until Webb's death in 2024. The continuation of the band made Bower, Vaughton and Webb the longest-serving members in its history, with their involvement spanning six decades from the group's formation in 1964. As of 2026, founding members Mick Bower and Brian Vaughton continue to lead the band, joined by Craig Holden, Bill Harrod and Dan Matejcic, while former member Doug Ford rejoined for select performances, bringing together musicians from both the original and classic line-ups. Like their contemporaries the Easybeats and the Twilights, the Masters Apprentices attempted to establish themselves in the United Kingdom, while later member Glenn Wheatley drew on his experiences with the band to become one of Australia's most successful artist managers, guiding the careers of Little River Band and John Farnham.

The Masters Apprentices were among Australia's most acclaimed rock bands of the 1960s and early 1970s, scoring a succession of Top 20 singles and earning a reputation as one of the country's leading live acts. Their music evolved from instrumental surf and rhythm and blues through beat music, psychedelia and progressive rock, reflecting the changing direction of Australian popular music during the era. Throughout their history the band underwent numerous line-up changes, with each era contributing to its musical evolution. Reflecting on the band's history in his 1999 autobiography His Master's Voice, Jim Keays paid particular tribute to the original line-up, writing that Mick Bower was "whose band it really was" and "the spiritual leader, originator and true genius" whose "early recordings of his songs will live on forever". Keays also praised founding drummer Brian Vaughton, writing that "Brian's drumming style was as unique as his character", while recognising the contributions of fellow founders Rick Morrison and Gavin Webb before acknowledging the musicians who later joined the group.

The group was notable in the Australian context for performing predominantly original material at a time when many Australian beat groups relied heavily on overseas repertoire. The early songwriting of founding guitarist Mick Bower played a defining role in establishing the band's identity, with compositions including "Undecided", "Wars or Hands of Time", "Buried and Dead", "Living in a Child's Dream", "Hot Gully Wind" and "Tired of Just Wandering". Bower's songs have continued to influence later generations of musicians. "Undecided" was recorded by Silverchair for the 1997 EP Garage Days Revisited, while "Living in a Child's Dream" has been covered by the Reels and Agro. Contemporary Australian band Civic recorded "Wars or Hands of Time", while in a 2024 interview Radio Birdman's Deniz Tek named "Buried and Dead" among his favourite Australian songs and described Mick Bower as "Australian rock's unsung hero". Bower's songwriting has also been sampled and reinterpreted by later artists, demonstrating the continuing influence of the band's early catalogue.

The Masters Apprentices are widely regarded as pioneers of Australian rock, helping shape the development of the country's original music scene during the 1960s and early 1970s. Their catalogue remains a significant part of Australian popular music history, while songs such as "Living in a Child's Dream", "Undecided", "Turn Up Your Radio" and "Because I Love You" continue to receive airplay, appear on retrospective compilations and inspire new generations of musicians. Swedish progressive metal band Opeth named the track "Master's Apprentices" from its 2002 album Deliverance in honour of the band.

== Personnel ==
Current members

- Mick Bower – guitar (1964–1967, 2014–present)
- Brian Vaughton – drums (1964–1967, 2014–present)
- Craig Holden – vocals (2014–present)
- Bill Harrod – bass guitar (2020–present)
- Dan Matejčić – guitar (2023–present)
Former members
- Doug Ford – guitar (1968–1972, 1987–1991, 1997, 2001–2002, 2026)
- Rick Morrison – guitar (1964–1967, 2014–2017)
- Gavin Webb – bass guitar (1964–1968, 2014–2024; died 2024)
- Jim Keays – vocals, harmonica, guitar (1965–1972, 1987–1991, 1994–1995; 1997, 2001–2002; died 2014)
- Rick Harrison – guitar (1967, 2017–2023)
- Steve Hopgood – drums (1967–1968)
- Tony Sommers – guitar (1967–1968)
- Peter Tilbrook – guitar, bass guitar (1967–1968)
- Colin Burgess – drums (1968–1972, 1987–1991, 2001–2002; died 2023)
- Glenn Wheatley – guitar, bass guitar (1968–1972, 1987–1988, 2002; died 2022)
- Denny Burgess – vocals, bass guitar (1972)
- Tim Wheatley – bass guitar (2001–2002)

== Discography ==
=== Studio albums ===
List of albums, with Australian chart positions
| Title | Album details | Peak chart positions |
| Title | Album details | AUS |
|---|---|---|
| The Masters Apprentices | Released: June 1967; Format: LP; Label: Astor (ALP-1025) | —N/a |
| Masterpiece | Released: February 1970; Format: LP; Label: Columbia (SCXO-7915) | —N/a |
| Master's Apprentices/Choice Cuts | Released: April 1971; Format: LP; Label: Columbia (SCXO 7983) | 10 |
| A Toast To Panama Red | Released: January 1972; Format: LP; Label: Columbia (SCXO 7998) | — |
| Do What You Wanna Do | Released: November 1988; Format: LP, CD, cassette; Label: Virgin (VOZ2022) | — |

=== Live albums ===
List of albums, with details
| Title | Album details |
|---|---|
| Nicklelodeon | Released: November 1971; Format: LP; Label: Columbia (SCXO 7992) |
| Live In Adelaide 2021 | Released: 2022; Format: CD; Label: The Grape Organisation |

=== Compilation albums ===
List of albums, with Australian chart positions
| Title | Album details | Peak chart positions |
| Title | Album details | AUS |
|---|---|---|
| Now That Its Over (Best Of) | Released: 1974; Format: LP; Label: EMI (EMC 2517) | — |
| Hands of Time | Released: 1981; Format: LP; Label: Raven (RVLP 01) | 78 |
| Jam It Up (Rarities 1965–1973) | Released: 1986; Format: LP, Cassette, CD; Label: Raven (RVLP-27) | — |
| The Very Best of Masters Apprentices | Released: March 1988; Format: LP, Cassette, CD; Label: Virgin (VOZ 2008) | 46 |
| Greatest Hits: 30th Anniversary | Released: 1995; Format: CD; Label: EMI (8146362) | — |
| Complete Recordings 1965–1968 | Released: 2000; Format: CD; Label: Ascension (ANCD 010); Note: Compiles recordings from the Astor label | — |
| From Mustangs to Masters – First Year Apprentices | Released: 2004; Format: CD; Label: Nickoff (NCD-1); Note: Unreleased tracks from April 1966 | — |
| From Mustangs to Masters – First Year Apprentices Vol. 2 | Released: 2004; Format: CD; Label: Nickoff (NCD-2); Note: Unreleased tracks from April 1966 | — |
| Fully Qualified: The Choicest Cuts | Released: 2006; Format: CD, digital; Label: EMI (0946 3 69574 2 5) | — |

=== EPs ===
List of EPs, with details
| Title | EP details |
|---|---|
| The Masters Apprentices | Released: February 1967; Format: 7"; Label: Astor (AEP-4012) |
| The Masters Apprentices Vol. 2 | Released: 1968; Format: 7"; Label: Astor (AEP-4059) |
| Turn Up Your Radio | Released: 1970; Format: 7"; Label: Columbia (SEGO-70190) |

=== Singles ===
| Year | Title | Peak chart positions | Album |
| Year | Title | AUS | Album |
|---|---|---|---|
| 1966 | "Undecided" | 13 | The Masters Apprentices (EP) & The Masters Apprentices |
| 1967 | "Buried and Dead" | 26 | The Masters Apprentices (EP) & The Masters Apprentices |
| 1967 | "Living in a Child's Dream" | 9 | The Masters Apprentices Vol. 2 (EP) |
| 1968 | "Elevator Driver" | 30 | The Masters Apprentices Vol. 2 (EP) |
| 1968 | "Brigette" | 32 | non-album single |
| 1968 | "But One Day" | — | The Master's Apprentices |
| 1969 | "Linda Linda" | — | Masterpiece |
| 1969 | "5:10 Man" | 16 | Masterpiece |
| 1969 | "Think about Tomorrow Today" | 12 | Turn Up Your Radio (EP) |
| 1970 | "Turn Up Your Radio" | 7 | Turn Up Your Radio (EP) |
| 1971 | "Because I Love You" | 12 | Choice Cuts |
| 1971 | "Future of Our Nation" (live) | 51 | Nickelodeon |
| 1972 | "Love Is" | — | A Toast to Panama Red |
| 1974 | "Rio de Camero" | — | non-album single |
| 1988 | "Because I Love You" (1988 version) | 30 | Do What You Wanna Do |
| 1988 | "Birth of the Beat" | 132 | Do What You Wanna Do |
| 1995 | "Turn Up Your Radio" (with Hoodoo Gurus) | — | Greatest Hits (30th Anniversary) |
"—" denotes a recording that did not chart or was not released in that territory.

== Awards and nominations ==
=== 5KA Awards ===
Adelaide radio station 5KA presented annual music awards during the 1960s recognising leading South Australian recording artists. The Masters Apprentices received several honours during their formative years, reflecting their status as one of Adelaide's most popular beat groups before achieving national success.

| Year | Nominee/Work | Award | Result |
|---|---|---|---|
| 1966 | The Masters Apprentices | Best SA Group | Winner |
| 1967 | The Masters Apprentices | Most Popular SA Group | Winner |
| 1967 | Undecided - Mick Bower and Rick Morrison | 5KA Top Talent Award - Listeners' Award | Winner |
| 1967 | Living in A Child's Dream - Mick Bower | Best SA Record | Winner |

=== ARIA Music Awards ===
The ARIA Music Awards is an annual awards ceremony that recognises excellence, innovation, and achievement across all genres of Australian music. They commenced in 1987. The Masters Apprentices were inducted into the Hall of Fame in 1998.

| Year | Nominee / work | Award | Result |
|---|---|---|---|
| 1998 | The Masters Apprentices | ARIA Hall of Fame | inductee |

=== Battle of the Sounds ===
The Hoadley's Battle of the Sounds was an annual national rock/pop band competition held in Australia from 1966 to 1972.

| Year | Nominee / work | Award | Result |
|---|---|---|---|
| 1968 | themselves | Battle of the Sounds National Final | 2nd |

=== Go-Set Pop Poll ===
The Go-Set Pop Poll was coordinated by teen-oriented pop music newspaper, Go-Set and was established in February 1966 and conducted an annual poll during 1966 to 1972 of its readers to determine the most popular personalities.

| Year | Nominee / work | Award | Result |
|---|---|---|---|
| 1967 | themselves | Top Australian Group | 5th |
| 1968 | themselves | Best Australian Group | 2nd |
| 1969 | themselves | Best Australian Group | 2nd |
| 1970 | themselves | Best Australian Group | 1st |
| 1970 | Jim Keays, Doug Ford | Best Australian Composer | 2nd |
| 1970 | Colin Burgess | Best Australian Drummer | 1st |
| 1970 | Doug Ford | Best Australian Guitarist | 1st |
| 1970 | Glenn Wheatley | Best Australian Guitarist | 5th |
| 1971 | themselves | Best Australian Group | 2nd |
| 1971 | Choice Cuts | Best Australian Album | 1st |
| 1971 | Jim Keays | Best Australian Male Vocal | 7th |
| 1971 | Doug Ford | Best Australian Guitarist | 2nd |
| 1971 | Colin Burgess | Best Australian Drummer | 1st |
| 1971 | Jim Keays, Doug Ford | Best Australian Songwriter/Composer | 5th |
| 1971 | "Because I Love You" | Best Australian Single | 6th |
| 1971 | Glenn Wheatley | Best Australian Bass Guitarist | 1st |

=== South Australian Music Awards ===
The South Australian Music Awards (also known as SA Music Awards, commonly SAM Awards) are annual awards that exist to recognise, promote and celebrate excellence in the South Australian contemporary music industry. They commenced in 2012. The lineup of: Mick Bower, Brian Vaughton, Gavin Webb, Rick Morrison and Jim Keays was inducted.

| Year | Nominee / work | Award | Result |
|---|---|---|---|
| 2014 | The Masters Apprentices | South Australian Music Awards Hall of Fame | inductee |
