= Jim Keays =

Scottish-Australian singer-songwriter, guitarist and harmonica-player (1946–2014)

- Born: 9 September 1946; Glasgow, Scotland, United Kingdom
- Origin: Adelaide, South Australia, Australia
- Died: 13 June 2014 (aged 67) Melbourne, Victoria, Australia
- Genres: Rock and roll, pop
- Occupations: Singer-songwriter; musician; producer; DJ; journalist
- Instruments: Vocals, guitar, harmonica
- Years active: 1964–2014
- Labels: Astor; EMI; Virgin; Gemstone; Possum; Liberation Blue; Universal Records; Ambition
- Formerly of: The Mustangs; the Masters Apprentices; Jim Keays Band; Jim Keays' Southern Cross; Manning/Keays Band; Keays; Cotton Keays & Morris
- Website: themastersapprentices.com jimkeays.com

James Keays Jr. (9 September 1946 – 13 June 2014) was a Scottish-born Australian musician who fronted the rock band The Masters Apprentices as singer-songwriter, guitarist and harmonica-player from 1965 to 1972 and subsequently had a solo career. He also wrote for a music newspaper, Go-Set, as its Adelaide correspondent in 1970 and its London correspondent in 1973.

The Masters Apprentices had Top 20 hits on the Go-Set National Singles Charts with "Undecided", "Living in a Child's Dream", "5:10 Man", "Think about Tomorrow Today", "Turn Up Your Radio" and "Because I Love You". The band reformed periodically, including in 1987 to 1988 and again subsequently. Keays, as a member of the Masters Apprentices, was inducted into the ARIA Hall of Fame in 1998. As a solo artist he issued the albums The Boy from the Stars (December 1974), Red on the Meter (October 1983), Pressure Makes Diamonds (1993), Resonator (2006) and Dirty, Dirty (2012).

He published his memoirs, His Master's Voice: The Masters Apprentices: The Bad Boys of Sixties Rock 'n' Roll, in 1999. From 2000, he performed in Cotton Keays & Morris alongside other former 1960s artists Darryl Cotton and Russell Morris. In July 2007, Keays was diagnosed with myeloma, which caused his kidneys to fail. By 2009 the cancer was in remission after chemotherapy and stem-cell transplants. However, he died in 2014 from pneumonia due to complications resulting from his cancer at age 67.

== Early years ==
Keays was born on 9 September 1946 in Glasgow, Scotland, where his unwed mother put him up for adoption at six months old. He was adopted by James Keays Sr. (born 7 November 1916) and Jessie Cameron (née Caldwell) Keays (born 16 February 1915), a childless couple from Clydebank. They migrated to Australia on RMS Asturias, leaving Southampton on 5 September 1951, four days before he turned five. They settled in Beaumont, a suburb of Adelaide.

He attended Burnside Primary School and then Norwood High School. Keays played Australian rules football up to under-17s and golf—a passion shared with his father. His interest in rock music began when he heard "Rip It Up" by Little Richard and "Great Balls of Fire" by Jerry Lee Lewis on a school friend's turntable when he was 11.

== Career ==
=== 1964: The Mustangs ===
The Mustangs were a surf music instrumental dance band formed in Adelaide in 1964 by guitarist Mick Bower, lead guitarist Rick Morrison, drummer Brian Vaughton and bassist Gavin Webb. Managed by Graham Longley, the group initially performed instrumental music inspired by the Shadows and the Ventures. Following the Beatles' tour of Australia, the band decided to recruit a lead singer and advertised for a vocalist. Jim Keays was the successful applicant. His arrival completed the line-up that would soon become the Masters Apprentices. During this period the band performed an instrumental set followed by a second set featuring original beat music written primarily by Bower, with Keays as vocalist.

=== 1965–1972: The Masters Apprentices ===
In late 1965, the Mustangs renamed themselves the Masters Apprentices (deliberately omitting the apostrophe). The name was conceived by Bower, who explained that the group regarded themselves as "apprentices to the masters of the blues—Chuck Berry, Bo Diddley, Jimmy Reed, Elmore James and Robert Johnson". Under Bower's musical direction, the band developed a repertoire of original material at a time when many Australian beat groups relied largely on overseas covers. Bower wrote or co-wrote the band's early recordings, including the national hit singles "Undecided" and "Living in a Child's Dream", helping establish the Masters Apprentices as one of Australia's leading original rock groups. Go-Set writer Ian "Molly" Meldrum declared that the band had "made the grade".

Whilst a member of the Masters Apprentices, Keays was one of hundreds of potential national service conscripts whose 20th birthday, 9 September, was picked in a 1966 ballot. He was able to legally avoid the draft by signing with the Citizens Military Force (CMF, later renamed the Army Reserve) and eluded a "short back and sides" haircut with the aid of a girlfriend, who pinned his long hair up under his slouch hat whenever he attended CMF sessions. By February 1967 the band had relocated to Melbourne. Late that year he began taking the illegal psychedelic drug, LSD. After Bower left the group in September 1967, because of a severe nervous breakdown, Keays became the de facto leader, while various line-up changes followed. Keays chose their "velvet, satin and floral-print psychedelic gear", which they wore on stage and for photo shoots.

In January 1968, Colin Burgess (ex-the Haze) joined on drums, followed by Doug Ford (ex-the Missing Links, Running Jumping Standing Still) on lead guitar. Keays and Ford began working as a song writing team, beginning with "Brigette", released as a single in June, which peaked into the Top 40. Glenn Wheatley (from Brisbane's blues group Bay City Union) had joined on rhythm guitar by May and later took over bass guitar.

The Masters Apprentices became the "bad-boys of rock", Keays was interviewed for Go-Set by staff reporter, Lily Brett, and the 'expose' was printed on 17 July 1968, headlined "Sex is Thrust upon Us", the article and its follow-up, "Whose Breasts Are Best?", revealed aspects of the bacchanalian scene where female groupies were called band molls:

many girls are potential band molls ... About 20 girls a day come to our house. On Sunday, it averages 50. I'll give you a typical example of what happens. Last week a girl walked in and said, 'Right, boys who's going to make love to me first?' She used a rather more obscene expression than 'make love' [...] And only recently we were in a Victorian country town when five girls aged between 15 and 18 somehow got into our hotel room. They didn't say a word. They took their clothes off and said: 'Will you judge and see which one of us has got the best breasts?'

— Jim Keays, July 1968, Go-Set interviews by Lily Brett, quoted in Molly Meldrum presents 50 years of rock in Australia

The "bad-boy" publicity also frustrated their manager, Darryl Sambell, who had planned to market them as a wholesome teen combo. Keays stated that there was a backlash from the interview: the roadway outside his flat in East St Kilda was daubed with the slogan "Band Moll's Paradise" in one-metre high letters, threats of physical beatings were made by male audience members and press claims that they were "sex maniacs" were regularly printed. During 1969 the band switched to wearing leather stage outfits—it was routine for the band to have their clothes and hair literally torn off by frantic fans, and the cost of buying expensive stage clothes which were being shredded nightly was sending them broke. But the leather gear—which resisted even the most ardent fans—provided them with their longest-wearing outfits in years, and Keays maintained that it saved them thousands of dollars.

In April 1970, EMI released the group's most popular single, "Turn Up Your Radio", co-written by Keays and Ford, produced by Howard Gable, and engineered by Ern Rose. It was recorded at a late-night session and Keays later recounted that he was so drunk when he recorded his vocals that he had to be held up to the microphone. The song was deliberately designed to be loud and offensive, and was intended as the final nail in the coffin to their ill-conceived teenybopper image. It was released just before the start of the 1970 radio ban—a major dispute between commercial radio stations and record companies—which resulted in the banning of many major-label releases. Despite little commercial radio airplay, the song raced up the charts and peaked at No. 7 nationally. During that year Keays was the Adelaide-based correspondent for Go-Set.

Keays and Ford co-wrote four of the band's Top 20 hits with "5:10 Man" (No. 16 on the Go-Set National Top 40 Charts, 1969), "Think About Tomorrow Today" (No. 12, 1969), "Turn Up Your Radio" (No. 7, 1970) and "Because I Love You" (No. 12, 1971). Keays and Ford also co-wrote "Quicksand" which was issued as a single by Adelaide-based blues group, The Expression, in June 1970. Australian musicologist, Ian McFarlane, declared that the track "ranks as one of the most astonishing hard guitar/psychedelic singles of the period". Keays and Ford co-wrote "St John's Wood" (mid-1970) for Brisbane-formed group, the Sect, which had relocated to Melbourne in late 1969 and signed with the same booking agency. From July 1970 the Masters Apprentices had relocated to the United Kingdom where they tried to break into the local market but they disbanded in 1972 without achieving any UK charting.

=== 1972-2014: Solo and with Southern Cross ===
After leaving the Masters Apprentices in early 1972, Keays returned to Australia and completed promotional duties for their just released single, "Love Is", which did not chart. He established a talent brokerage, Rock on Agency. Keays compèred the Meadows Technicolor Fair in Adelaide in January that year. He wrote an article about the festival for Go-Set, which was printed to coincide with its first day. He followed by compèring the Mulwala Festival in April. According to Daily Planet's Dean Moriarty the latter festival's promoters had shown "little respect for artists and audience", Keays and his wife "spent a night ... on the ground in the rain".

From late March 1973 he played the role of "The Lover" in the Australian version of the Who's rock opera, Tommy. The Melbourne performance was broadcast in early April on TV station HSV-7. Also during that year Keays wrote for Go-Set as their London correspondent, providing "News and gossip from within the music industry". In January 1974, Keays compèred the fourth annual Sunbury Pop Festival. He then oversaw the Masters Apprentices' compilation album Now That It's Over (October 1974), drawing on their later career. He designed its cover, with liner notes written by Howard Lindley, a freelance journalist and film maker. Lindley had been working on a film about the group before he committed suicide in 1972. EMI released a track from the compilation as single by The Masters Apprentices, "Rio de Camero", in August 1974, which garnered radio airplay but it did not chart.

In December 1974, Keays released his debut solo album, Boy from the Stars, also on EMI. It was an ambitious concept LP with the science fiction theme of an alien arriving on Earth to warn of the misuse of power sources. For the album, which was produced by Ian Miller, Keays wrote all the lyrics and most of the music. Session musicians included: David Allardice on piano, James Black on guitar, Geoff Bridgeford on drums, Joe Creighton on bass guitar, Mick Elliot on guitar, Dennis Garcia on keyboard, Billy Green on guitar, Marcia Hines on backing vocals and Lobby Loyde on guitar. The Canberra Times' Tony Catterall felt the "main concept ... has been done to death" while musically it showed a "lack of expertise ... while striving for effect succeeds only in producing a sea of mud that obscures Keays's lyrics and drowns the individual instruments in a swirl of uninteresting sound". Whereas McFarlane declared it was "put together with a great deal of skill and attention to detail".

His first single, "Kid's Blues", was also released in December. Some tracks from Boy from the Stars were performed at the final Sunbury Pop Festival in January 1975, by his all-star backing group, Jim Keays Band. They were joined on-stage by Wheatley, recently returned from the UK, in their last performance together for over ten years. As a member of The Masters Apprentices, Keays had endured rip-offs, where promoters had made considerable profits while they had received little payment. At Sunbury 1975 Keays and his band were one of few Australian groups to be paid for appearing—Keays had wisely arranged an outside sponsor—low attendance and the huge $60,000 fee paid to head-lining group, Deep Purple, meant that few of the other Australian acts were paid, and the festival organisers went into liquidation soon after. His second single, "The Boy from the Stars", was released in February.

Keays provided lead vocals for Cybotron's Steve Maxwell Von Braund's debut solo album, Monster Planet (1975). He followed with a single-only release, "Give It Up", an anti-drug song, and subsequently toured with the line-up of Allardice, Bridgeford, Creighton, Elliot and Garcia in his backing band. Late that year he formed Jim Keays' Southern Cross with Elliot and Rick Brewer (ex-Zoot) on drums, Rex Bullen (Bakery) on keyboards, George Cross (Clydehouse) on bass guitar. They reworked, "Undecided" which was issued as a single for CBS Records in December 1975, by then the line-up had changed to Peter Laffy (Fox) on guitar, Ron Robinson on bass guitar and John Swan (Fraternity) on drums.

Keays co-produced an album, Riding High (February 1976), by Melbourne-based hard rock group Freeway, which Catterall opined had "a serious identity problem ... not knowing if it's the Allman Brothers Band, Grinderswitch or Lynard Skynard [sic], it also has tendencies toward sounding like Bad Company and the Doobie Brothers"; while Keays work is criticised as he "does tend to overuse" synthesisers. In July 1977, he teamed up with Phil Manning (ex-Bay City Union, Chain) on guitar to form Manning/Keays Band. The line-up included Peter Cuddily on bass guitar (ex-Space Waltz); John Grant on keyboards (ex-Freeway); Andrew Kay on violin and keyboards; and Robert Ross on drums. The band started recording an album but Keays left the project, which continued as Manning. Also that year Keays relocated to the United States' West Coast, where he lived for almost two years.

By 1978 he formed another version of Jim Keays Band with Black, Robinson, and David Rowe on drums. Black was replaced by John Moon (Buster Brown) on guitar and Geoff Spooner on guitar. Renamed as The Keays in 1979, his band was Moon, Peter Marshall on bass guitar, Nigel Rough on drums (Loose Trousers) and Bruce Stewart on guitar (Loose Trousers). This line-up released the single, "Lucifer Street" in 1980. Stewart became seriously ill and the album, Red on the Meter, was delayed until October 1983. It was produced by John L Sayers (Radio Birdman, Jimmy Little, Mi-Sex). Keays worked as a radio DJ from 1983 to 1987, and was also a producer of Melbourne music program, Performance which was renamed as Night Life, during 1984 to 1985. Keays and Moon joined as guest musicians with The Incredible Penguins (containing future band mate Wayne Mathews) in 1985, for a cover of "Happy Xmas (War Is Over)", in a charity project for research on Fairy penguins, which peaked at No. 10 on the Australian Kent Music Report in December.

In 1987 he signed with Virgin Records in UK and recorded another version of "Undecided" with Andy Scott (Sweet) on guitar and produced by Craig Leon. The single was released in July, followed by a cover of Count Five's "Psychotic Reaction" in October. Keays participated in various reunions of The Masters Apprentices from later 1987. He released his next solo album, Pressure Makes Diamonds, co-produced with producer, composer and guitarist, Frank Sablotny (a.k.a. Frank Tayla) in 1993 on Gemstone Records. It included the track, "Waiting for the Big One", co-written by Keays and Sablotny. In 1998, Australian Recording Industry Association (ARIA) inducted The Masters Apprentices into the Hall of Fame. Keays wrote his memoirs, His Master's Voice: The Masters Apprentices: The Bad Boys of Sixties Rock 'n' Roll, in 1999. Wheatley also published his memoirs, Paper Paradise: Confessions of a Rock 'n' Roll Survivor, later that year.

From 2000, he toured periodically as a member of Cotton Keays & Morris with 1960s artists Darryl Cotton from Adelaide's Zoot and Russell Morris from Melbourne's Somebody's Image.

The ABC-TV series, Long Way to the Top, was broadcast in August 2001. Keays featured in "Episode 2: Ten Pound Rocker 1963–1968" where he discussed the UK migrant influence on The Masters Apprentices early work and "Undecided"; and in "Episode 3: Billy Killed the Fish 1968–1973" where he described pioneering pub rock and the band's groupies.

The TV series inspired the Long Way to the Top national concert tour during August–September 2002, which included a range of Australian acts of the 1950s, 1960s and 1970s. The classic line-up of Burgess, Ford, Keays and Wheatley reformed The Masters Apprentices although Wheatley only performed for a couple of the concerts and was substituted on bass guitar by his son, Tim Wheatley. Performances of "Because I Love You" and "Turn Up Your Radio" at the final Sydney concert, as well as an interview with promoter, Amanda Pelman, feature on the associated DVD, Long Way to the Top: Live in Concert released in 2002.

Keays continued with Cotton Keays & Morris tours and reunions of The Masters Apprentices. His next solo album, Resonator, was released in 2006 on the Liberation Blue label. In 2007 he reflected on his longevity as a performer "I guess I'm a bit of a Peter Pan ... If you've still got the passion and can still do it. Age is no barrier". His next solo album, Dirty, Dirty, appeared in 2012. In May 2014 he performed at Crown Casino in Melbourne. Keays was due to reunite in July 2014 with the original Masters Apprentices line-up of Mick Bower, Brian Vaughton, Rick Morrison and Gavin Webb, for the band's induction into the South Australian Music Hall of Fame. However, he died on 13 June 2014, three months short of his 68th birthday. At the induction ceremony, Keays was inducted posthumously alongside his fellow original band members. His ex-wife Karin Tonkin and daughters Holly and Bonnie accepted the award on his behalf, while the surviving original members reunited on stage. Joined by vocalist Craig Holden and Keays' daughters, they performed a tribute celebrating the band's legacy, with Bower's original guitar work once again featuring prominently in songs including "Living in a Child's Dream" and "Undecided". The reunion marked the beginning of a new chapter for The Masters Apprentices, who continued performing and touring with Craig Holden on vocals following the ceremony. Jim Keays died on 13 June 2014, 3 months short of his 68th birthday. Keays had been working on his next album, Age Against the Machine, prior to his death.

== Personal life ==
Early in 1970, Keays married his pregnant girlfriend Vicki in Plympton, South Australia. They had a son. In 1981, the couple separated; Keays is grandfather to James' son, Will. Keays' adoptive parents, James and Jessie Keays, both died in 1975. His biological mother, Nancy (born 13 June), re-established contact with him in 1984. Keays and his second wife, Karin, were parents of two daughters and a son who was born on 1 November 2003, but only survived for six hours. Karin had previously ceased to be a director of Jim's company, and by 2012 had resumed using her maiden name, Tonkin. In a contemporaneous Sydney Morning Herald report published shortly before Jim Keays' death, she was identified as his ex-wife and referred to as Karin Tonkin.

=== Declining health and death ===
In July 2007 Jim Keays was diagnosed with myeloma, which caused his kidneys to fail. He was put on dialysis and chemotherapy, then he had stem-cell transplants and returned to performing with Cotton Keays & Morris. As of February 2009, he had been in remission. However, he died on 13 June 2014 – his mother's birthday – from pneumonia due to complications resulting from his cancer, at a Melbourne hospital.

== Discography ==
The Masters Apprentices

=== Studio albums ===
List of albums, with selected chart positions
Title	Album details	Peak chart positions
Title	Album details	AUS
The Boy from the Stars	Released: 1974; Format: LP; Label: EMI (106335)	27
Red on the Meter	Released: 1983; Format: LP; Label: Rumur Records (RUM 001)	-
Pressure Makes Diamonds	Released: 1993; Format: CD; Label: Possum (PDCD116)	-
Resonator	Released: 2006; Format: CD; Label: Liberation Music (BLUE079.2)	-
Dirty, Dirty	Released: 2012; Format: CD, Download; Label: Shock (JK001)	-
Age Against The Machine	Released: 2015; Format: CD, Download; Label: TLP Productions (L2-5)	-
Caledonia	Released: November 2024; Format: CD, Download; Label: Masters Apprentices	-

=== Singles ===
List of singles, with selected chart positions
Year	Title	Peak chart positions	Album
Year	Title	AUS	Album
1974	"Kid's Blues"	-	The Boy from he Stars
1975	"The Boy from the Stars"	57	The Boy from he Stars
1975	"Give It Up"	-	non album single
1975	"Undecided" (as Jim Keays Southern Cross)	74	non album single
1976	"Queen of Rock 'n' Roll"	-	non album single
1980	"Lucifer Street"	-	Red On the Meter
1987	"Undecided"	-	non album single
1987	"Psychotic Reaction"	-	non album single
1994	"Waiting for the Big One"	-	Pressure Makes Diamonds
1994	"This Song"	-	Pressure Makes Diamonds

Cotton Keays & Morris

== Awards and nominations ==
=== EG Awards / Music Victoria Awards ===
The EG Awards (known as Music Victoria Awards since 2013) are an annual awards night celebrating Victorian music. They commenced in 2006.

Year	Nominee / work	Award	Result
2012	Dirty, Dirty	Best Album	Nominated

=== Go-Set Pop Poll ===
The Go-Set Pop Poll was coordinated by teen-oriented pop music newspaper, Go-Set and was established in February 1966 and conducted an annual poll during 1966 to 1972 of its readers to determine the most popular personalities.

Year	Nominee / work	Award	Result
1970	himself	Best Composer	2nd
1971	himself	Best Composer	5th

== Bibliography ==
- Keays, Jim (1999). His Master's Voice: The Masters Apprentices: The Bad Boys of Sixties Rock 'n' Roll. St Leonards, NSW: Allen & Unwin. ISBN 1-86508-185-X. Note: limited preview for on-line version.
