= Brian Cadd discography =

- Studio albums: 13
- EPs: 1
- Live albums: 2
- Compilation albums: 6

The discography of Brian Cadd, an Australian singer-songwriter, who had four Australian top-20 singles and three top-20 albums in the early 1970s. Cadd was also the lead singer of bands such as The Groop, Axiom, The Flying Burrito Brothers and The Blazing Salads. On 18 July 2007, the Australian Recording Industry Association (ARIA) recognised Cadd's iconic status when he was inducted into the ARIA Hall of Fame.

== Albums ==
=== Studio and live albums ===
List of studio and live albums, with selected chart positions
Title	Album details	Peak chart positions	Certifications (sales thresholds)
Title	Album details	AUS	Certifications (sales thresholds)
Brian Cadd	Released: November 1972; Label: Bootleg / Chelsea (BLA-023); Format: Vinyl, cassette	3	
Parabrahm	Released: October 1973; Label: Bootleg / Chelsea (BLA 034); Format: Vinyl, cassette	5	
Moonshine	Released: August 1974; Label: Bootleg / Chelsea (BLA 044); Format: Vinyl, cassette	11	AUS: Gold
White on White	Released: September 1976; Label: Interfusion (L 36074)/ Capitol (ST-11573); Format: Vinyl, cassette	93	
Yesterdaydreams	Released: 1978; Label: Interfusion (L 36733)/ Capitol (SW-11681); Format: Vinyl, cassette	—	
No Stone Unturned	Released: 1985; Label: Graffiti (824668-1); Format: Vinyl, cassette, CD	—	
Live at Crown	Released: November 1998; Label: Warner Music (9300002 980111); Format: CD, cassette	—	
Cleanskin	Released: 2003; Label: MGM Distribution (CDE001); Format: CD	—	
Quietly Rusting	Released: October 2005; Label: MGM Distribution (CDMN0502); Format: CD	—	
Live at the Con (credited to Brian Cadd and Russell Morris)	Released: November 2007; Label: Caddman Enterprise (CDMN0711); Format: CD, digital download	—	
Wild Bulls and Horses (credited to Brian Cadd and Russell Morris)	Released: June 2011; Label: Caddman Enterprise (CDMN004); Format: CD, digital download	—	
The Story of Sharky and the Caddman (credited to Glenn Shorrock and Brian Cadd)	Released: October 2013; Label: Fanfare; Format: CD, digital download	148	
Bulletproof (credited to Brian Cadd and The Bootleg Family Band)	Released: 11 November 2016; Label: Caddman Enterprise / MGM Music; Format: CD, digital download	—	
Silver City	Released: 1 February 2019; Label: FanFare (FANFARE323); Format: CD, digital download, Streaming	—	
Dream Train	Released: 5 April 2024; Label: Ambition (AMBITION226); Format: CD, digital download, Streaming	40	

=== Compilation albums ===
List of live albums, with selected chart positions
Title	Album details	Peak chart positions
Title	Album details	Kent Music Report
The Magic of Brian Cadd	Released: April 1975; Label: Bootleg (BLA 047); Format: Vinyl, cassette	34
Keep on Rockin'	Released: 1976; Label: J&B (J&B 180); Format: Vinyl, cassette	54
The Best of Brian Cadd	Released: 1979; Label: Summitt (SRA295291); Format: Vinyl, cassette; Re-release of 1972 album Brian Cadd	—
The Great Brian Cadd	Released: August 2002; Label: Mana Music Productions; Format: CD, digital download; 3 CD set	—
From This Side of Things	Released: 2010; Label: Caddman Enterprises; Format: CD	—
The Ultimate Collection (The Bootleg Years)	Released: October 2019; Label: Fanfare; Format: CD	—

== Extended plays ==
List of extended plays
Title	Details
Brian Cadd	Released: August 1973; Label: Bootleg (BLEP 188); Format: Vinyl, cassette

== Singles ==
Year	Title	Peak chart positions	Album
Year	Title	AUS	Album
1971	"Show Me the Way"	15	Non-album single
1972	"Ginger Man"	16	Brian Cadd
1973	"Every Mother's Son"	44	Brian Cadd (EP)
1973	"Handy Man"	77	Parabrahm
1973	"Alvin Purple"	49	Alvin Purple
1974	"A Little Ray of Sunshine"	—	Non-album single
1974	"Class of '74"	54	Non-album single
1974	"Let Go"	10	Moonshine
1974	"Boogie Queen"	87	Moonshine
1975	"Gimme Gimme Good Lovin'"	93	Non-album single
1976	"White on White El Dorado"	84	White on White
1978	"Yesterday Dreams"	—	Yesterdaydreams
1979	"Skating on Thin Ice"	—	Yesterdaydreams
1980	"Very Very Very Long Time"	—	Non-album single
1982	"My Baby (Loves to Hurt Me)"	54	Non-album single
1985	"Land of the Video"	—	No Stone Unturned
1985	"Still Hurting Me"	—	No Stone Unturned
2000	"Orchestra of Grunt" (with Glenn Shorrock )	—	Non-album single
2003	"To Love Somebody" (with Marcia Hines, Max Merritt and Doug Parkinson)	96	Non-album single
2008	"Simple Ben" (with Lior, Mike Rudd and Old Man River)	—	Non-album single
2024	"You Know What to Say"	—	Dream Train
2026	"Believe" (with friends)	—	
