= Bulletproof (disambiguation) =

To be bulletproof is to embody a bulletproofing technology.

Bullet proof or bulletproof may also refer to:

== Films and television ==
- Bullet Proof (1920 film), starring Harry Carey
- Bulletproof (1988 film), directed by Steve Carver and starring Gary Busey
- Bulletproof (1996 film), directed by Ernest R. Dickerson and starring Adam Sandler and Damon Wayans
- Bulletproof (2020 film), a documentary film
- Bulletproof (TV series), a 2018 British television drama series, created by and starring Noel Clarke and Ashley Walters

== Music ==
=== Albums ===
- Bulletproof (soundtrack), a 2005 soundtrack album by rapper 50 Cent from the game 50 Cent: Bulletproof
- Bulletproof (Julian Austin album), 2002
- Bulletproof (Brian Cadd and the Bootleg Family Band album), 2016
- Bulletproof (Hush album), 2005
- Bulletproof (Reckless Kelly album), 2008
- Bulletproof (Hard Stuff album), 1972
- Bulletproof (1996 soundtrack)
- Bulletproof (Young Dolph album), 2017

=== Songs ===
- "Bulletproof" (Dotter song), 2020
- "Bulletproof" (Godsmack song), 2018
- "Bulletproof" (La Roux song), 2009
- "Bulletproof" (Raheem DeVaughn song), 2009
- "Bulletproof" (Stan Walker song), 2013
- "Bulletproof", by Accept from their 1993 album Objection Overruled
- "Bulletproof", by Attila from their 2016 album Chaos
- "Bullet Proof", by Blue Rodeo from their 2002 album, Palace of Gold
- "Bulletproof", by Paul Stanley from his 2006 album, Live to Win
- "Bulletproof", by Blue Stahli from their 2009 album Antisleep Vol. 01
- "Bulletproof", by Five Finger Death Punch from their 2009 album War Is the Answer
- "Bullet Proof", by George Clinton from his 1985 album, Some of My Best Jokes Are Friends
- "Bulletproof", by Kerli from her 2008 album Love Is Dead
- "Bullet Proof", by Morcheeba from their 1998 album, Big Calm
- "Bulletproof!", by Pop Will Eat Itself from their 1992 album, The Looks or the Lifestyle?
- "Bulletproof", by Queensrÿche from their 2015 album Condition Hüman
- "Bulletproof", by Rilo Kiley from their 2001 album Take Offs and Landings
- "Bulletproof", by the Afghan Whigs from their 1996 album Black Love
- "Bullet Proof", by the Goo Goo Dolls from their 1998 album, Dizzy Up the Girl
- "Bullet Proof.. I Wish I Was", by Radiohead from their 1995 album The Bends
- "Bullet Proof", by This Is the Kit from their 2017 album, Moonshine Freeze

== Other uses ==
- 50 Cent: Bulletproof, a 2005 video game starring various hip-hop artists
- Baldwin P. "Bulletproof" Vess, a character from the animated television series, C.O.P.S.
- Bullet-Proof (G.I. Joe), a fictional character in the G.I. Joe universe
- Bulletproof Coffee, a brand of coffee drink
- Bulletproof, type of non-interactive zero-knowledge proof

== See also ==
- Bulletproof hosting, a euphemism for Internet hosting services that permit users to send spam e-mail and host illicit materials
- Bullet Proof Software, a video game developer now known as Blue Planet Software
- Bulletproof Heart (disambiguation)
