= Max Merritt =

New Zealand-born singer-songwriter (1941–2020)

- Born: Maxwell James Merritt; 30 April 1941; Christchurch, New Zealand
- Died: 24 September 2020 (aged 79) Los Angeles, California, U.S.
- Genres: Soul, R&B, rock
- Occupations: Singer-songwriter, guitarist
- Years active: 1956–2012
- Labels: His Master's Voice; Zodiac; Viking; RCA; Parlophone; Arista; Polydor; Raven
- Formerly of: Max Merritt & the Meteors, Ray Columbus & the Invaders, Billy Thorpe and the Aztecs

Maxwell James Merritt (30 April 1941 – 24 September 2020) was an Australian-New Zealand singer-songwriter and guitarist who was renowned as an interpreter of soul music and R&B. As leader of Max Merritt & the Meteors, his best known hits are "Slippin' Away" (1975), which reached No. 2 on the Australian singles charts, and "Hey, Western Union Man" (1969) which reached No. 13. Merritt rose to prominence in his native New Zealand from 1958 and relocated to Sydney, Australia, in December 1964. Merritt was acknowledged as one of the best local performers of the 1960s and 1970s and his influence did much to popularise soul, R&B and rock in New Zealand and Australia.

Merritt was considered a pioneer of rock in Australasia who produced crowd-pleasing shows for over 50 years. He engendered respect and affection over generations of performers. This was demonstrated at the 2007 Concert for Max, which was organised to provide financial support after it was announced he had Goodpasture's syndrome, a rare autoimmune disease. The Australian Recording Industry Association (ARIA) recognised Merritt's iconic status on 1 July 2008 when he was inducted into the ARIA Hall of Fame. In 2020, Merritt was inducted into the New Zealand Music Hall of Fame. Maxwell Merritt died in 2020, aged 79.

== Biography ==
=== 1956–1962: Early career in Christchurch ===
Born in Christchurch, New Zealand, Merritt was interested in music from an early age and started guitar lessons at 12. By 1955 he encountered the rock and roll of Bill Haley and Elvis Presley. After leaving school in 1956, aged 15, Merritt formed the Meteors with friends Ross Clancy (sax), Peter Patonai (piano), Ian Glass (bass) and Pete Sowden (drums). Initially a part-time group, they played dances and local charity concerts, Merritt continuing his day job as an apprentice bricklayer in his father's business. When his parents, together with local Odeon theatre manager Trevor King, developed the Christchurch Railway Hall into a music venue, The Teenage Club, they hired Merritt and the Meteors. The Teenage Club drew hundreds of locals and increased their popularity in the city when most businesses and public venues closed until late on Sunday afternoon.

Clancy was replaced by Willi Schneider during 1958, the band released their debut single, "Get a Haircut", in June on His Master's Voice. By 1959, the Meteors had become a top youth attraction, regularly pulling crowds of 500 or more. Merritt borrowed players from other bands if a Meteors' member was unavailable, one such band was Ray Columbus & the Invaders fronted by vocalist Columbus. From this band Merritt recruited guitarist Dave Russell and bass guitarist / keyboardist Billy Karaitiana (a.k.a. Billy Kristian). In January 1959, New Zealand's top rocker, Johnny Devlin, played in Christchurch. Devlin later saw Merritt at a "Rock'n'Roll Jamboree" charity concert where Devlin's manager Graham Dent was impressed enough to praise their performance to Auckland promoter Harry M. Miller. Miller added the Meteors to Australian rocker Johnny O'Keefe's 1959 tour of New Zealand.

Christchurch had been chosen as the site for a United States paramilitary base to access Antarctica. Code-named "Operation Deep Freeze", it had the only airfield large enough to handle the huge transport planes. The US presence provided a greater influence of rock and roll music – young servicemen discovered The Teenage Club and the gravel-voiced young Kiwi singer, Merritt. More rock and roll and R&B records entered local jukeboxes and were on radio. From their US connections, both the Meteors and the Invaders were able to equip themselves with Fender guitars and basses, which were still rare in Australia and the UK due to import restrictions. By 1959 the line-up for the Meteors had become Rod Gibson (saxophone), Ian Glass (bass guitar), Bernie Jones (drums) and Billy Kristian (piano). Early in 1960, His Master's Voice released their debut album, C'mon Let's Go. Follow up singles were "Kiss Curl" and "C'Mon Let's Go" in 1960 and "Mr Loneliness" in 1961. They had local support but were almost unknown beyond the South Island. In an effort to break into the more lucrative North Island market, both Max Merritt & the Meteors and Ray Columbus & the Invaders relocated to Auckland in November 1962.

=== 1963–1964: Auckland and Invaders & Max Merritt's Meteors ===
After reaching Auckland, Merritt's band became the second most popular band in New Zealand behind the Invaders which played a beat pop style while the Meteors tackled rock and roll, soul and R&B. Max Merritt & the Meteors backed Dinah Lee on recordings. Her best known single, "Reet Petite", from September 1964 reached No. 1 on the New Zealand charts and No. 6 in Melbourne, Australia. The Meteors' line-up of Merritt, Peter Williams (guitar), Teddy Toi (bass) and Johnny Dick (drums) recorded material for their second album, Max Merritt's Meteors. They relocated to Sydney in December 1964.

=== 1965–1967: Sydney and Shake ===
In Sydney, the Meteors made their first Australian television appearance on Johnny O'Keefe's Sing Sing Sing. By April 1965, the second Meteors' album was finally released on RCA Records and contained a range of styles, including the single "So Long Babe". Other singles followed but Toi and Dick left to join Billy Thorpe and the Aztecs and were eventually replaced by former member Kristian on bass and Bruno Lawrence on drums. During February 1966, visiting UK acts the Rolling Stones and the Searchers were supported on tour by Max Merritt and the Meteors. After a cruise ship gig to New Zealand (during which Lawrence abruptly left the group), Merritt heard Otis Redding's version of "Try a Little Tenderness" and recorded his own cover in 1967. Turmoil within the Meteors saw a rapid turnover of members and by May, Merritt with Bob Bertles on saxophone, Stewart "Stewie" Speer on drums and John "Yuk" Harrison on bass guitar, decided to relocate to Melbourne.

=== 1967–1971: Melbourne and Max Merritt and the Meteors ===
In Melbourne, Merritt and his band initially found it difficult obtaining regular gigs and so travelled widely through the state. On 24 June 1967 the van they were travelling in to Morwell collided head-on with a car near Bunyip, Bertles suffered a broken leg, Speer had both legs crushed, broke both arms and lost the tops off several fingers. Merritt lost his right eye and had his face scarred. It took the band nearly a year to recover. By July 1968 they competed in Hoadley's Battle of the Sounds, finishing behind winners the Groove, the Masters Apprentices and Doug Parkinson.

In 1969 the group were re-signed by RCA and they released their first single for over two years, a cover of Jerry Butler's "Hey, Western Union Man", which reached No. 13 on the Go-Set National Top 40, and No. 15 on Kent Music Report's top 100 singles chart. In early 1970 their third album, Max Merritt and the Meteors, was released with six original tracks and five covers. It reached No. 8 on the national albums chart. Dave Russell (ex-Ray Columbus & the Invaders) replaced Harrison on bass and Merritt's band were asked by the Australian Broadcasting Corporation (ABC) to provide a four-part TV series called Max Merritt and the Meteors in Concert. In late 1970 they released Stray Cats and followed with the singles "Good Feelin'" and "Hello LA, Bye Bye Birmingham" in 1971 and "Let it Slide" in 1972. Neither the album nor the singles charted well. By that time, Merritt had relocated again – this time to England.

=== 1971–1976: United Kingdom ===
In London from early 1971, the group played the UK pub circuit, initially with little success but their popularity slowly grew and they supported Slade and the Moody Blues on their tours. In 1974, however, the Meteors fell apart again, leaving Merritt and Speer to recruit John Gourd on guitar, slide guitar and piano; Howard Deniz on bass and Barry Duggan on sax and flute. This line-up were signed by US-based Arista Records for their newly established UK label and released A Little Easier with the title single "A Little Easier" in 1975. "Slippin' Away" was their second single from the album and captured the attention of radio listeners in both Australia and New Zealand, reaching No. 2 in Australia and No. 5 in New Zealand. Their best performed single drove the sales of A Little Easier which reached No. 4 on the Australian album charts. Another album, Out of the Blue (No. 13, 1976), was released with a renewed version of "Let it Slide" (No. 29) as a single in Australia. During this time the group played regular gigs at the White Hart in Willesden Green, the Nashville Rooms in West Kensington, the Windsor Castle on the Harrow Road and in 1976 played a memorable gig at Alexandra Palace where Merritt got to the gig on the day after travelling back from New Zealand to visit his dying mother, who died while he was en route. By 1977, with the advent of punk rock the band's popularity on the UK pub circuit had declined and they effectively disbanded. Merritt then relocated to the US.

=== 1977–1999: Based in United States ===
Merritt relocated to Nashville, Tennessee, in 1977 and signed as a solo artist with Polydor Records, which released Keeping in Touch in 1979. He then moved to Los Angeles, where he continued to reside. He toured Australia in 1979 and 1980. On the second tour he put together a band with Stewie Speer on drums, Paul Grant on guitar, John Williams on keyboards, Martin Jenner on guitar and Phil Lawson on bass. This was Merritt and Speer's last major tour together: Speer died of a heart attack on 16 September 1986. Merritt released singles "Growing Pains" in 1982 and "Mean Green Fighting Machine" in 1986, the second was a promotional single for the Canberra Raiders Rugby League team. He toured Australia in 1991 with Brian Cadd (ex-The Groop, Axiom, solo) in the Brian Cadd and Max Merritt Band, which comprised Merritt, Cadd (vocals, piano), John Dallimore (guitar; ex-Redhouse, Dallimore, Jon English Band), Craig Reeves (keyboards), Des Scott (bass) and Dave Stewart (drums; ex-Daniel). In late 1996, Merritt returned to Australia to tour the club and pub circuit.

=== 2000–2020: Resurgence and death ===
Merritt toured Australia on a short club circuit in April 2001 along with Doug Parkinson, a fellow veteran rocker from the 1960s. This marked a resurgence of interest for Merritt and April and May were spent touring Australia under the banner "The Heart & Soul of Rock & Roll" with Parkinson; August and September 2002 was the Long Way to the Top concert tour. After that, whenever Merritt returned to Australia, a reformed Max Merritt & the Meteors were in demand for special events and music festivals such as the Melbourne Music & Blues Festival, the Perth Moonlight Festival, the Veterans Games in Alice Springs, the Queenscliff Festival and the Toyota Muster in Gympie. In April 2006, the group appeared at the Byron Bay Blues Festival and the Gladstone Harbour Festival.

In mid-April 2007, Merritt was admitted to a Los Angeles hospital with symptoms of kidney failure. He was diagnosed with Goodpasture syndrome, a rare autoimmune disorder that affects the kidneys and lungs. Merritt was struggling with his health and finances, so his manager Wal Bishop and Australian music industry friends, organised a Concert for Max benefit held at the Palais Theatre, St Kilda, Victoria, on 21 October 2007 which raised $200,000. On 1 July 2008, Merritt was inducted by Glenn A. Baker into the ARIA Hall of Fame. Merritt was joined on stage by Kasey Chambers and Bill Chambers to perform "Slipping Away".

The lively appearance of New Zealand-born veteran Max Merritt, who has been struggling with illness at his home in Los Angeles, was another highlight ... He sounded terrific last night, aided by the Australian country star Kasey Chambers and her father, Bill, on "Slipping Away". Merritt was moved to tears by the tribute and his speech was high on emotion.

— Andrew Murfett, 2 July 2008

Merritt died in a hospital in Los Angeles, California, on 24 September 2020, at age 79, 13-years after being diagnosed with Goodpasture's syndrome. He was survived by his children and grandchildren.

Prior to his death, Merritt had recorded a new album, titled I Can Dream. The album was released on 27 November 2020.

== Discography ==
=== Studio albums ===
List of albums, with Australian chart positions
Title	Album details	Peak chart positions
Title	Album details	AUS
C'mon Let's Go (as Max Merritt & the Meteors)	Released: 1960; Format: LP; Label: His Master's Voice (MCLP 6079)	-
Max Merritt's Meteors (as Max Merritt & the Meteors)	Released: 1965; Format: LP; Label: RCA (RPL-3400)	-
Max Merritt and the Meteors (as Max Merritt & the Meteors)	Released: May 1970; Format: LP; Label: RCA (SL-101891)	7
Stray Cats (as Max Merritt & the Meteors)	Released: 1971; Format: LP; Label: RCA (SL-101906)	-
A Little Easier (as Max Merritt & the Meteors)	Released: October 1975; Format: LP, Cassette; Label: Arista (ARTY 108)	10
Out of the Blue	Released: July 1976; Format: LP, Cassette; Label: Arista (ARTY 134)	17
Keeping in Touch	Released: March 1979; Format: LP, Cassette; Label: Polydor (2383 514)	70
Black Plastic Max	Released: 1980; Format: LP, Cassette; Label: Polydor (2383 558)	-
I Can Dream	Released: 27 November 2020; Format: CD, Download, streaming; Label: FanFare (FANFARE388)	

=== Live albums ===
Title	Details
Back Home Live	Released: 1977; Format: LP, Cassette; Label: Arista (ARTY 149); Note: Recorded in Melbourne, 1976
Been Away Too Long (as Max Merritt & the Meteors)	Released: April 2012; Format: CD, Digital download; Label: LosTraxx (LTR001); Note: Recorded in 1969

=== Compilation albums ===
Title	Details
The Early Years (as Max Merritt & the Meteors)	Released: 1985 (New Zealand); Format: LP, Cassette; Label: Hughes Leisure Group (RNR-5637)
17 Trax of Max (as Max Merritt & the Meteors)	Released: 1986; Format: LP, Cassette; Label: Raven Records (RVLP24)
23 Trax of Max (1965-1982)	Released: 2000; Format: CD; Label: Raven Records (RVCD15)
The Very Best of Max Merritt & the Meteors (as Max Merritt & the Meteors)	Released: 2001; Format: CD; Label: EMI (534711 2)
The Essential Max Merritt & the Meteors (as Max Merritt & the Meteors)	Released: 2007; Format: 2xCD; Label: Sony BMG (88697177952)

=== Extended plays ===
Title	Details
Don't You Know .. Dinah Lee (As Dinah Lee and Max Merritt and His Meteors)	Released: 1964; Format: LP; Label: Viking (VE-148)
Yeah, Yeah, We Love.. Dinah Lee (As Dinah Lee and Max Merritt and His Meteors)	Released: 1964 (New Zealand); Format: LP; Label: Viking (VE-150)
Good Golly Max Merritt	Released: July 1964 (New Zealand); Format: LP; Label: Viking (VE-151)
Shake (As Max Merritt and His Meteors)	Released: 1966; Format: LP; Label: Parlophone (GEPO-70033)

=== Singles ===
Year	Single	Chart Positions		Album
Year	Single	AUS	NZ	Album
1959	"Get a Haircut"	—N/a	-	
1959	"Kiss Curl"	—N/a	-	
1962	"Mister Loneliness"	—N/a	-	
1962	"Weekend"	—N/a	-	
1963	"The Slow One"	—N/a	-	
1963	"Soft Surfie"	—N/a	-	
1963	"Laughing Girl"	—N/a	-	
1964	"Many Things"	-	-	
1964	"Valley of the Souix"	-	-	
1964	"Giddy Up a Ding Dong!"	-	-	
1964	"I Just Don't Understand" (with Tommy Adderley)	-	-	
1964	"Reet Petite" (with Dinah Lee)	-	-	Don't You Know .. Dinah Lee
1965	"So Long Baby"	-	-	Max Merritt's Meteors
1965	"Zip-a-Dee-Doo-Dah"	94	-	Shake
1965	"You Deserve What You've Got"	-	-	Shake
1966	"Shake" / "I Can't Help Myself"	58	-	Shake
1966	"Fannie Mae"	88	-	Max Merritt and the Meteors
1969	"Hey, Western Union Man"	15	-	Max Merritt and the Meteors
1971	"Good Feelin'"	67	-	Stray Cats
1971	"Hello L.A., Bye-Bye Birmingham"	-	-	Stray Cats
1975	"A Little Easier"	-	-	A Little Easier
1975	"Slipping Away"	2	5	A Little Easier
1976	"Let It Slide"	32	-	Out of the Blue
1976	"Take Part of Me"	-	-	Out of the Blue
1976	"Whisper in My Ear"	-	-	Out of the Blue
1978	"Wish You'd Never Come Into My Life"	-	-	Keeping in Touch
1979	"Dirty Work"	57	-	Keeping in Touch
1979	"It's Over"	-	-	Keeping in Touch
1982	"Growing Pains"	-	-	
1986	"Mean Green Fighting Machine"	-	-	
2003	"To Love Somebody" (with Marcia Hines, Doug Parkinson and Brian Cadd)	96	-	
2020	"I Can Dream Can't I?	-	-	I Can Dream

== Awards and halls of fame ==
=== ARIA Awards ===
The ARIA Music Awards is an annual awards ceremony that recognises excellence, innovation, and achievement across all genres of Australian music. They commenced in 1987. In 2008, Max Merritt was inducted into the ARIA Hall of Fame.

Year	Nominee / work	Award	Result
2008	Max Merritt	ARIA Hall of Fame	inductee

=== Aotearoa Music Awards ===
The Aotearoa Music Awards (previously known as New Zealand Music Awards (NZMA)) are an annual awards night celebrating excellence in New Zealand music and have been presented annually since 1965. The New Zealand Music Hall of Fame is a figurative hall of fame dedicated to noteworthy New Zealand musicians. It was established in 2007. In 2020, Max Merritt was inducted into it.

Year	Nominee / work	Award	Result
2020	Max Merritt	New Zealand Music Hall of Fame	inductee

== Band members ==
Members of Max Merritt & the Meteors, Max Merritt's Meteors or the Meteors; arranged chronologically:

- Max Merritt (1956–2020) — guitar, vocals, drums
- Ross Clancy (1956–1958) — saxophone
- Ian Glass (1956–1960) — bass
- Peter Patonai (1956–1959) — piano
- Pete Sowden (1956–1959, 1960–1963) — drums
- Willi Schneider (1958–1959) — saxophone
- Rod Gibson (1959–1960) — saxophone
- Bernie Jones (1959–1960) — drums
- Billy Kristian (Billy Karaitiana) (1959–1963, 1965–1967) — bass guitar, piano, keyboards
- Maurice Cook (1960) — guitar
- Geoff Cox (1961–1962) — guitar
- Peter Williams (1962–1967) — lead guitar, rhythm guitar, vocals
- Mike Angland (1963–1964) — bass
- Johnny Dick (1963, 1965) — drums
- Teddy Toi (1964–65) — bass
- John Blake (1965) — bass
- Jimmy Hill (1965) — drums
- Bill Flemming (1965–1966) — drums
- David "Bruno" Lawrence (1966–1967) — drums
- John Charles (1967) — keyboards
- Mike Gibbs (1967) — brass instruments
- Bob Bertles (1967–1974) — tenor saxophone
- Stewie Speer (1967–1976, 1980) — drums
- John "Yuk" Harrison (1967–69) — bass
- Dave Russell (1969–1974) — bass
- Howard "Fuzz" Deniz (1974–1977) — bass
- Barry Duggan (1974–1975) — sax, flute
- John Gourd (1974–1977) — guitar, slide guitar, piano
- Lance Dixon (1975–1977) — keyboards, saxophone
- Paul Grant (1980) — guitar
- Martin Jenner (1980) — guitar
- Phil Lawson (1980) — bass
- John Williams (1980) — keyboards
