= The Magic of Brian Cadd =

Greatest hits album by Brian Cadd
- Released: April 1975
- Genre: Pop/Rock, Classic rock
- Label: Bootleg Records
- Producer: Brian Cadd

Brian Cadd chronology
Moonshine (1974)	The Magic of Brian Cadd (1975)	White On White (1976)

The Magic of Brian Cadd is the first greatest hits album by Australian singer-songwriter Brian Cadd. It was released in Australia in April 1975 by Bootleg Records. The album includes tracks from his three studio albums to date; Brian Cadd, Parabrahm and Moonshine as well as his debut single "Show Me the Way" on an album for the first time. The album was the Cadd's final release on this label.

The Magic of Brian Cadd peaked at number 34 in the Australian Kent Music Report album charts.

== Track listing ==
All tracks written by Brian Cadd, except where noted

Side A

1. "Show Me The Way" (Don Mudie) - 4:02
2. "Silver City Celebration Day" - 3:59
3. "Class of '74" - 2:49
4. "Sometime Man" - 2:23
5. "Spring Hill Country Breakdown" - 3:12
6. "Every Mothers Son" - 3:40
7. "Handyman" - 5:03
8. "Josie Mc Ginty" - 2:11

Side B

1. "Keep On Rockin'" - 4:39
2. "Ginger Man" - 4:03
3. "Kingston River Travellin' Man" - 3:08
4. "All in the Way" - 4:03
5. "Alvin Purple" - 2:23
6. "Let Go" - 4:18
7. "Think It Over" - 3:42

== Charts ==
Chart (1975)	Peak position
Australian Kent Music Report Albums Chart	34
