= The Groove (band) =

Australian musical group (1967–1971)

- Also known as: Eureka Stockade
- Origin: Melbourne, Victoria, Australia
- Genres: R&B, pop
- Years active: 1967–1971
- Labels: EMI, Columbia
- Past members: Geoff Bridgford; Jamie Byrne; Tweed Harris; Rod Stone; Peter Williams

The Groove was an Australian R&B, pop group which formed in early 1967 with the lineup of Geoff Bridgford on drums, Jamie Byrne on bass guitar, Tweed Harris on keyboards, Rod Stone on guitar and Peter Williams on lead vocals and guitar. In December 1967 their single, "Simon Says", peaked at No. 17 on the Go-Set National Top 40 Singles Chart. They followed with "Soothe Me", which peaked at No. 14 in April 1968. Also in April they released their self-titled debut album. In July that year they won the national final of the Hoadley's Battle of the Sounds competition with the prize including a trip to London. They relocated there in March 1969, and early the following year they changed their name to Eureka Stockade, they disbanded in 1971. On 13 October 2004 Tweed Harris died of throat cancer, aged 63.

== History ==
The Groove was an R&B pop group formed in Melbourne in early 1967 – all members had some experience in other bands. The original line-up was Geoff Bridgford (ex-Steve & the Board) on drums, Jamie Byrne (Black Pearls, Running Jumping Standing Still) on bass guitar, Tweed Harris (Levi Smith Clefs) on keyboards, Rod Stone (The Librettos, Normie Rowe & The Playboys) on guitar and Peter Williams (Max Merritt & The Meteors) on lead vocals and guitar. They were gathered together by artist manager and booking agent, Garry Spry (The Twilights). The Groove played Stax Soul and 1960s R&B in the style of Otis Redding, Wilson Pickett, Sam & Dave, Arthur Conley and The Isley Brothers. The Groove's repertoire was tailored to the vocal style of Williams, who had gained experience in this genre when with Max Merritt & The Meteors, one of its earliest exponents in Australasia.

The Groove scored early national chart breakthrough with their second single "Simon Says" – previously recorded by both The Isley Brothers and The Platters. The Groove's version was a Top 10 hit in Sydney and Melbourne and peaked at No. 17 on the Go-Set National Top 40 Singles Chart in December 1967. The group undertook a national tour in February 1968 and in April their most successful single and second national Top 20 hit – a cover version of Sam Cooke's "Soothe Me" – peaked at No. 14. That same month they issued their debut self-titled album, The Groove, on EMI and Columbia Records. In July they won the grand final of a national band competition, Hoadley's Battle of the Sounds – their prize was a trip to London.

Their next single, "What Is Soul?", was a cover of Ben E. King's song, it was a No. 13 hit in Melbourne, reached the Top 40 in Brisbane, and peaked at No. 36 on the national Top 40. They released a further single, "You Are the One I Love", which made the lower reaches of the Melbourne and Brisbane charts but did not reach the national Top 40. In March 1969, using their Hoadley's competition prize, the band relocated to the United Kingdom. Later that month their single, "Relax Me", reached the Go-Set Top 40. In the UK they worked and recorded for two years. In June 1969 they released a last single, "The Wind", as The Groove – it did not chart. In early 1970 the group changed their name to Eureka Stockade and issued another single, "Sing No Love Songs", in February. The group recorded an album for Decca Records which was not released, then, early in 1971, they disbanded.

== After disbandment ==
After the breakup of The Groove, Harris and Stone toured the UK and the rest of Europe backing Cliff Richard and playing with The Echoes behind John Rowles. Stone also toured in the backing band for comedians Eric Morecambe and Ernie Wise, which he considers one of the enjoyable moments of his career. Bridgford joined the Bee Gees (replacing Colin Petersen) while Williams teamed up with female vocal trio, The Cookies (also managed by Spry) to become The Spirit of Progress and toured the UK. Later on he joined The Mixtures and toured Europe and Australia.

Harris became an arranger and producer in Australia from the mid-1970s. His credits include Sherbet (he orchestrated their single "Cassandra" and its parent album), Daryl Braithwaite, production for Renee Geyer, Bobby Bright, Kush, and folk artist Lionel Long. He performed as second keyboardist with the reformed version of The Groop for its 1988–89 reformation tour, and undertook TV soundtrack commissions. In later years he had a career writing music for TV and advertising both in Australia and Singapore. Harris was diagnosed with throat cancer in the late 1990s and underwent surgery, he died on 13 October 2004, aged 63.

== Discography ==
=== Studio albums ===
Title	Details
The Groove	Released: April 1968; Label: EMI Columbia OSX 7869

=== Extended plays ===
Title	Details
Soothe Me	Released: July 1969; Label: EMI Columbia SEGO 70166

=== Singles ===
Year	Single	Chart Positions	Album
Year	Single	AU	Album
1967	"Simon Says"	16	The Groove
1968	"Soothe Me"	10	The Groove
1968	"What Is Soul"	35	The Groove
1968	"You Are The One That I Love"	39	Non-album Single
1969	"Relax Me"	34	Non-album Single
1969	"The Wind"	82	Non-album Single
1970	"Sing No Love Songs"	-	Non-album Single

== Awards and nominations ==
=== Go-Set Pop Poll ===
The Go-Set Pop Poll was coordinated by teen-oriented pop music newspaper, Go-Set and was established in February 1966 and conducted an annual poll during 1966 to 1972 of its readers to determine the most popular personalities.

Year	Nominee / work	Award	Result
1968	themselves	Best Australian Group	3rd
