= The Very Best of Russell Morris =

Greatest hits album by Russell Morris
- Released: 4 October 2013
- Recorded: 1968–1972, 2008
- Genre: Pop rock
- Label: EMI Music
- Producer: Ian Meldrum, Howard Gable, Peter Dawkins

Russell Morris chronology
| Sharkmouth (2012) | The Very Best of Russell Morris (2013) | Van Diemen's Land (2014) |

The Very Best of Russell Morris is the fifth greatest hits compilation by Australian singer songwriter and ARIA Hall of Fame recipient, Russell Morris. The album was released in October 2013 following the unexpected success of Sharkmouth.

The first fifteen tracks are the same as his 2008 compilation, The Greatest Hits. The three last tracks are from his 2008 album, Jumpstart Diary. According to Noise11, the album continues to sell 'decent numbers' each week; some two years since its release. The album peaked in April 2014 at 198 on the ARIA charts.

== Track listing ==
CD (3753643)

1. "Hide & Seek" credited to Somebody's Image (Doug Trevor, Martin Van Wyk) - 2:00
2. "The Real Thing" (Johnny Young) - 6:22
3. "Part Three into Paper Walls" (Russell Morris, Johnny Young) - 7:02
4. "It's Only a Matter of Time" (Hans Poulsen) - 3:01
5. "The Girl That I Love" (Johnny Young) - 4:37
6. "You On My Mind" (Hans Poulsen) - 2:28
7. "Boom Town" (Russell Morris) - 3:18
8. "Rachel" (Raymond Froggatt) - 4:22
9. "Mr America" (Russell Morris) - 3:53
10. "Sweet, Sweet Love" (Russell Morris) - 4:28
11. "Live With Friends" (Russell Morris, Brian Cadd) - 3:41
12. "O Helly" - (Russell Morris) - 2:41
13. "Jail Jonah's Daughter" - (Russell Morris) - 3:03
14. "Alcohol Farm" (Russell Morris) - 3:22
15. "Wings of an Eagle" (Russell Morris) - 3:57
16. "Blown Away" (Russell Morris) - 3:46
17. "As Far as I Remember" (Russell Morris) - 4:07
18. "I Will Wait for You" (Russell Morris) - 3:44

== Charts ==
Chart performance for The Very Best of Russell Morris
| Chart (2013–2014) | Peak position |
|---|---|
| Australian Albums (ARIA) | 198 |
