= Pastoral Symphony (Australian band) =

- Origin: Melbourne, Victoria, Australia
- Genres: Pop; rock
- Years active: 1968
- Label: Festival
- Past members: Peter Brideoake; Terry Britten; John Bywaters; Ronnie Charles; Johnny Hawker; Clem McCartney; Laurie Pryor; Glenn Shorrock; Terry Walker

Pastoral Symphony were an Australian studio-based pop, rock super group, which formed in 1968. Their sole release was a single, "Love Machine" (May 1968), which is a cover version of American group, the Roosters' track from earlier in that year. The band included members of the Twilights supplemented by additional musicians.

"Love Machine" reached No. 10 on the Go-Set National Top 40. The performers were Peter Brideoake and Terry Britten on guitars, John Bywaters on bass guitar, Laurie Pryor on drums, and Clem "Paddy" McCartney and Glenn Shorrock on backing vocals (all from the Twilights); others were vocalists, Terry Walker (the Hi Five, Ray Hoff & the Offbeats, the Strangers) and Ronnie Charles (the Groop), with orchestral backing arranged and performed by the Johnny Hawker Orchestra with Hawker also providing harmony vocals. The single was produced by English-born, Jimmy Stewart, and Australian entrepreneur, Geoffrey Edelsten via Festival Records.

Stewart and Edelsten wanted to form a touring version of Pastoral Symphony, however, an unrelated group had already registered the name. That group also released a single, "Sunshine Is My Sorrow", in 1968. Legal disputes between the two groups resulted in neither band continuing. In 1977 Edelsten, then based in Los Angeles, produced new versions, "Love Machine 1968" backed with "Love Machine 1977", on a single, for Festival Records.

== Discography ==
- "Love Machine" (Jimmy Griffin, Michael Z. Gordon) / "Spread a Little Love Around" (Jimmy Stewart, Johnny Hawker) (May 1968) – Festival Records (MX27095/MX27096, FK-2343)
