= Parabrahm =

Parabrahm may refer to:

- Para Brahman, a term often used by Vedantic philosophers as to the "attainment of the ultimate goal"
- Parabrahm (album), an album by Australian singer, Brian Cadd
