= Brideoake =

Brideoake is a surname. Notable people with the surname include:

- Peter Brideoake (1945–2022), Australian musician, composer, singer, songwriter, and lecturer
- Ralph Brideoake (1612/1613–1678), English clergyman
