= Bootleg Family Band =

Australian Pop/Rock band

- Also known as: The Bootleg Band; Avalanche
- Origin: Melbourne, Victoria, Australia
- Genres: Folk; rock; R&B
- Years active: 1973–1978; 2015–2016
- Label: Bootleg
- Past members: Brian Cadd; Geoff Cox; Tony Naylor; Penny Dyer; Gus Fenwick; Brian Fitzgerald; Angela Labrandi (nee Jones); Louise Lincoln; Russell Smith; Clive Harrison; Ian Mason; John Grant

Bootleg Family Band were an Australian folk, R&B and rock band formed in 1973 by Brian Cadd on lead vocals with Geoff Cox on drums, Tony Naylor on lead guitar, Penny Dyer on backing vocals, Gus Fenwick on bass guitar, Brian Fitzgerald on keyboards, Angela Jones on lead and backing vocals, Louise Lincoln on backing vocals and Russell Smith on trumpet. The group became the in-house band for Cadd's label, Bootleg Records. They also released their own material and had chart success with cover versions of "Your Mama Don't Dance" (February 1973) and "The Shoop Shoop Song (It's in His Kiss)" (July 1974), which both reached the top 10 on Australian singles charts. The group toured the United States and performed on the TV shows, The Midnight Special and Don Kirshner's Rock Concert in 1974. Early in the following year they trimmed back to a five-piece line-up as The Bootleg Band. Late that year, Cadd left to work in the US and the remaining members renamed themselves as Avalanche. That group issued a self-titled album in September 1976 and had a further name change to Front Page disbanded in 1978. Cadd reassembled the Bootleg Family Band in 2015 to release a studio album, Bulletproof (November 2016), which was supported by a short tour.

== History ==
The Bootleg Family Band were formed in 1973 in Melbourne by Brian Cadd on lead vocals (ex-the Castaways, the Beale Street Band, the Groop, Axiom) with Geoff Cox on drums (ex-Cycle), Penny Dyer on backing vocals, Gus Fenwick on bass guitar (ex-Healing Force), Brian Fitzgerald on keyboards, Angela Jones on lead and backing vocals, Louise Lincoln on backing vocals, Tony Naylor on lead guitar (ex-Ida May Mack, Band of Talabene) and Russell Smith on trumpet (ex-Ram Jam Big Band, Levi Smith's Clefs). Fable Records owner and producer, Ron Tudor, and Cadd had established a sub-label, Bootleg Records, in late 1971. Initially the label had used session musicians for recordings, "[who] would back [Cadd] and all the other artists on the label - singer songwriter Stephen Foster, jazz singer Kerrie Biddell, and the harmony group Mississippi."

Australian musicologist, Ian McFarlane, described why Cadd formed the Bootleg Family Band: it was "drawn along similar lines to that employed by American singer/producer Leon Russell" for Shelter Records. Their debut single was a cover version of Loggins and Messina's "Your Mama Don't Dance" in February 1973. It peaked at number 4 on the Go-Set Top 40 Singles Chart. The second single, "Wake Up Australia", released in June failed to reach the top 40. The band's third single, a cover version of "The Shoop Shoop Song (It's in His Kiss)", was released in July 1974, which peaked at number 10 on the Kent Music Report. Also in that year the band provided a cameo in a nightclub scene of the Australian feature film, Alvin Rides Again. The group toured the United States and performed on the TV shows, The Midnight Special and Don Kirshner's Rock Concert in 1974.

In February 1975 the group issued a self-titled extended play (a four-track compilation of their singles' A-sides) via the Bootleg label, which was produced by Cadd. A trimmed line-up in May 1975 with Cadd, Cox and Naylor joined by Clive Harrison on bass guitar (ex-Kush) and Ian Mason on keyboards (ex-Mason's Cure), was renamed, the Bootleg Band. After Cadd left the group to return to the US, in November 1975, they were renamed Avalanche, with Cox, Harrison and Naylor joined by Adrian Campbell on lead vocals (ex-Raw Glory). That group issued a self-titled album in September 1976. Early in the following year Cox and Harrison left and were replaced by John Barnes and Graham Thompson, respectively. Barnes was soon replaced by Barry Cram on drums (ex-Pantha), while Gerard McCabe joined on keyboards. Avalanche issued a final single, which was a cover version of the Beatles' "Got to Get You into My Life", in November 1978 before disbanding.

Cadd re-assembled the Bootleg Family Band in 2015, with Cox, Fenwick, Jones (as Angela Labrandi), Lincoln and Naylor joined by additional musicians. The group issued a studio album, Bulletproof (November 2016). A tour supported its release, including opening for The Beach Boys in 2016.

== Discography ==
=== Albums ===
- Avalanche (by Avalanche) (September 1976) Bootleg Records
- Bulletproof (by Brian Cadd and the Bootleg Family Band) (11 November 2016) – Caddmann Enterprises / MGM Distribution (CDMN006)

=== Extended plays ===
- The Bootleg Family Band (February 1975) Bootleg Records

=== Singles ===
The Bootleg Family Band

- 1973 "Your Mama Don't Dance" / "Honky Tonk Woman" AUS Go-Set: No. 4
- 1973 "Wake Up Australia" / "Ballad of Billy Clover"
- 1974 "The Shoop Shoop Song (It's in His Kiss)" / "Walking Home in the Morning" AUS KMR: No. 10
- 1975 "Green Door" / "Kenny" AUS KMR: No. 98

The Bootleg Band

- 1975 "How Do I Try?" / "Rockin' Hollywood" AUS KMR: No. 60

Avalanche

- 1976 "Wizard of Love"
- 1976 "Sweet Baby Brown Eyes"
- 1976 "Landslide"
- 1977 "Good for Me Good for You"
- 1978 "Got to Get You into My Life"
