= Hey, Western Union Man =

Single by Jerry Butler

from the album The Ice Man Cometh
- B-side: "Just Can't Forget About You"
- Released: 1968
- Recorded: 1968
- Studio: Sigma Sound, Philadelphia, Pennsylvania
- Genre: Soul
- Length: 2:37
- Label: Mercury
- Songwriters: Jerry Butler; Kenny Gamble; Leon Huff

Jerry Butler singles chronology
"Never Give You Up" (1968)	"Hey, Western Union Man" (1968)	"Are You Happy" (1968)

"Hey, Western Union Man" is a 1968 soul single by Jerry Butler written by Butler with Kenny Gamble, and Leon Huff. It was Jerry Butler's second number one R&B hit on the Billboard chart, where it stayed for a week. "Hey, Western Union Man" was also part of a string of Top 40 crossover hits that Jerry Butler had during the late 1960s.

== Chart positions ==
Chart (1968)	Peak position
CAN RPM	15
U.S. Billboard Hot 100	16
U.S. Billboard Hot Black Singles	1

== Cover versions ==
- Al Kooper – on his 1968 album I Stand Alone.
- Diana Ross and The Supremes – on their Let the Sunshine In album (1969).
- Max Merritt & the Meteors - on their third album Max Merritt and the Meteors (1969), which was issued as a single and reached No. 15 on Australia's Kent Music Report
- In 1970, Grant Green – on the live album Alive!, recorded at the Cliche Lounge in Newark, New Jersey.
- Bruce Springsteen – for his 2022 album, Only the Strong Survive.
