= A Little Ray of Sunshine =

Single by Axiom

from the album Fool's Gold
- B-side: "Ford's Bridge"
- Released: March 1970
- Recorded: 1970
- Genre: Pop
- Length: 3:25
- Label: EMI; Parlophone
- Songwriters: Brian Cadd; Don Mudie
- Producers: Axiom; June Productions

Axiom singles chronology
"Arkansas Grass" (1969)	"A Little Ray of Sunshine" (1970)	"My Baby's Gone" (1971)

"A Little Ray of Sunshine" is a song by Australian country rock band Axiom. The track was co-written by band members Brian Cadd and Don Mudie. It was released as a single in March 1970 and peaked at number 5 on the Go-Set National Top 40 in May 1970. The song was celebrated with its own stamp in Australia Post's 1998 Australian Rock stamp series.

== Background ==
Axiom formed in late 1969 in Melbourne as a country rock group by Brian Cadd on co-lead vocals, organ and piano, Doug Lavery on drums, Don Mudie on bass guitar, Glenn Shorrock on co-lead vocals and rhythm guitar, and Chris Stockley on lead guitar. "A Little Ray of Sunshine" was co-written by Cadd and Mudie.

According to Australian music journalist Ed Nimmervoll, "[it was] inspired by the birth of Don Mudie's first child." However, according to Cadd, the song was written about his niece. The song is written to celebrate her arrival.

Axiom travelled to London in May 1970 to attempt to break into the English music market. Meanwhile, the Australian music market was embroiled in the 1970 radio ban, with major labels and radio networks involved in a "pay for play" dispute. Christobel Munson of The Canberra Times described, on 16 May 1970, how, "commercial radio stations throughout Australia ceased to play most British and Australian-made records from midnight last night" and cited a local disc jockey, Terry Malcolm, who predicted, "the average listener would not notice the difference in programmes. 'The main ones which will be dropped after Friday night will be the Beatles' 'Let It Be', the Axiom (an Australian pop group) record 'A Little Ray of Sunshine'..." Axiom's single peaked at number 5 on the Go-Set National Top 40.

== Track listing ==
7" single (7XAPA1869)

All tracks written by Brian Cadd and Don Mudie.

- Side A "A Little Ray of Sunshine" - 3:25
- Side B "Ford's Bridge" - 3:40

== Charts ==
=== Weekly charts ===
Chart (1970)	Position
Australian Go-Set Chart	5

=== Year-end charts ===
Chart (1970)	Position
Australian Go-Set Chart	47
Australian Artist Go-Set Chart	11

== Cover versions ==
- In 1974, Brian Cadd released a solo version.
- In 2011, Denis Walter recorded a version for his album Songs from a Southern Land
- In 2013, Glenn Shorrock recorded a version for his album 45 Years of Song
