= The Twilights =

Australian rock band (1964–1969)

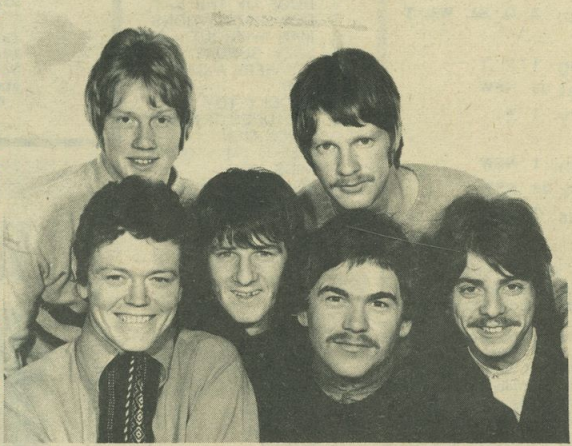
- The Twilights c.1968. Top row: Peter Brideoake, Laurie Pryor. Bottom row: Clem "Paddy" McCartney, John Bywaters, Glenn Shorrock Terry Britten.

Background information
- Origin: Adelaide, South Australia, Australia
- Genres: Rock, beat pop
- Works: Discography
- Years active: 1964–1969
- Labels: EMI, Columbia, His Master's Voice
- Spinoffs: Pastoral Symphony; Axiom; Quartet
- Spinoff of: The Hurricanes; the Checkmates
- Past members: Frank Barnard; Peter Brideoake; John Bywaters; Clem "Paddy" McCartney; Kevin Peek; Glenn Shorrock; Terry Britten; Laurie Pryor

The Twilights were an Australian rock band, which formed in Adelaide in 1964 by Peter Brideoake on rhythm guitar, John Bywaters on bass guitar, Clem "Paddy" McCartney and Glenn Shorrock both on lead vocals. They were joined by Terry Britten on lead guitar and Laurie Pryor on drums within a year. Heavily influenced by the British Invasion, they became a significant Australian band during the mid-1960s. They were noted for their musicianship, on-stage humour and adoption of overseas sounds and trends. Their most popular single is a cover version of "Needle in a Haystack" (originally by the Velvelettes), which topped the Go-Set singles chart in 1966. Also in that year, they won the Hoadley's Battle of the Sounds competition and were awarded a trip to London.

The group's attempts to establish themselves in England were unsuccessful. Upon return to Australia they had a No. 3 hit with "What's Wrong with the Way I Live?" (1967), written by the Hollies members. Their other top 5 hits were "Young Girl" and "Cathy Come Home" (both 1967). The Twilights' later sound was influenced by the psychedelic movement. In 1968 they filmed a pilot for a Monkees-style sitcom for Seven Network, however sponsorship was withdrawn and it was not broadcast. Following a decline in their chart success and the departure of long-term manager Gary Spry, the Twilights disbanded early in 1969. Shorrock formed Axiom in 1969 and fronted Little River Band from 1975. Britten became an internationally successful songwriter, working for Cliff Richard and Tina Turner.

== History ==
=== 1964–1965 ===
The Twilights were formed as a beat pop group in Elizabeth, then an outer-suburb of Adelaide, South Australia in mid-1964. Elizabeth's population, at that time, largely consisted of British immigrants and their descendants. Founding members were Frank Barnard on drums, Peter Brideoake on rhythm guitar, John Bywaters on bass guitar and Kevin Peek on lead guitar (all ex-the Hurricanes) as well as Clem "Paddy" McCartney on co-lead vocals and Glenn Shorrock on co-lead vocals (both ex-the Checkmates). According to James Cockington, their motivation was to become pop stars and so avoid being factory workers like their parents.

The beat pop six-piece were influenced by the Beatles (who had toured Australia in mid-year), the Hollies, the Who and the Small Faces, and they were informed of music trends by relatives and contacts back in Britain. The Hurricanes had started as a Shadows-style instrumental act but, after the Beatles became popular, many Australian bands recruited lead singers. The Checkmates had been an a capella trio and two of their vocalists merged with four of the Hurricanes to form the fully electric-and-vocal group, the Twilights. Peek soon left and was replaced on lead guitar by Terry Britten. Late in 1964, they were signed by Melbourne-based manager Gary Spry.

The group issued their debut single, "I'll Be Where You Are" / "I Don't Know Where the Wind Will Blow Me", on EMI's Columbia Records in June 1965. The former track was written by Britten and Shorrock, while the latter was penned by Brideoake and Shorrock. It appeared in the top 100 of the Kent Music Report (non-contemporaneous back-calculated chart).

The Twilights gained a reputation for dynamic live shows. Cockington observed that Adelaide later created more musically adept bands – James Taylor Move and early Zoot – but Spry provided "overly-enthusiastic" management and touted his group as the "next big thing." Early in 1965, Barnard left after Spry enforced a "no girlfriends on tour" policy – Barnard was married. He was replaced on drums by Laurie Pryor (ex-John E. Broome & the Handels). Spry convinced the group to relocate to Melbourne in late 1965, where they took up a three-month residency at his discotheque, Pinocchio's. Their reputation spread, with Ed Nimmervoll noting that their "ability to be human jukeboxes for the music of the day made them the sensations of Melbourne."

=== 1966 ===
The Twilights competed in the Hoadley's Battle of the Sounds from April 1966, winning the South Australian state final at Thebarton Town Hall over the Masters Apprentices. At Festival Hall, Melbourne in July the Twilights won the national final. They were awarded bonus points for sound, originality, presentation and audience reaction. A competition rule, which set maximum group membership at five, meant that McCartney sat out their winning performance – he returned for their encore. The competition's first prize was a trip to the United Kingdom – they embarked for London on 26 September 1966 via passenger liner Castel Felice.

The Twilights highest national chart success came with their cover version of the Velvelettes' "Needle in a Haystack" (August 1966). The group were still in London as it peaked at No. 1 on Go-Set's National Top 40 in October and displaced the Beatles' "Yellow Submarine". Their next single, "You Got Soul" (December), reached No. 24 nationally. In absentia, they released a self-titled album in December 1966, produced by David Mackay, via EMI/Columbia. It included originals, works written by Barry Gibb or by Hans Poulsen, as well as mod-rock cover renditions of concert favourites.

While in London they adopted the latest Mod hairstyles, Carnaby Street clothes and grew moustaches, emulating trends set by the Beatles. They had high hopes of success, but were dismayed by the quality of British groups. Shorrock observed: "Our biggest shock was the high standard of so many groups who are not even known. It was hard for us to get jobs with good money." They played a week's residency at Liverpool's Cavern club with a positive response. Due to their EMI contract, the group recorded three tracks at Abbey Road Studios, with producer-engineer Norman Smith. Smith had worked with the Beatles, who were recording "Penny Lane" and allowed the Twilights to observe some sessions. Nevertheless, the Australian group's attempts to break through in the UK were unsuccessful.

=== 1967 ===
Upon return to Australia in February 1967, the Twilights issued their rendition of the Hollies' "What's Wrong with the Way I Live?", which peaked at No. 3. It was written for the Twilights by the Hollies' members Allan Clarke, Tony Hicks and Graham Nash and had been recorded at Abbey Road. It exhibited a sophisticated sound with its banjo motif and tight block harmonies. Its B-side, "9.50", composed by Britten is a psychedelic rocker and was covered by Divinyls in the early 1980s.

A third track recorded at Abbey Road provided their next single "Young Girl" (May), which was a melancholy and evocative tune written by Pryor, and features Britten's use of a variable volume pedal. It peaked at No. 4. Britten embraced Eastern philosophy and introduced exotic instruments including a sitar on its B-side "Time and Motion Study Man", a social observation. Contemporary music reporter Garry Raffaele reflected on the mediocrity of Australian bands, "[who] had the temerity to introduce instruments like the sitar into their work... better if they had learned to play their guitars first." However, "a few groups like the Twilights realised what was happening and tried to make it happen here."

Their next single "Cathy Come Home" / "The Way They Play" (November 1967), also used the sitar. The A-side is inspired by the 1966 BBC-TV play of the same name. A promotional music clip was made. The single reached No. 4, but it was the last top 10 from the group. "Cathy Come Home" is the first of Britten's songs inspired by movies or TV shows, which he continued in his later career. The group performed Sgt. Pepper's Lonely Hearts Club Band (June 1967) and the Small Faces' Ogdens' Nut Gone Flake (May 1968) "with exacting perfection," weeks before their respective official releases in Australia.

=== 1968 ===
The group were invited by Seven Network to develop a weekly TV sitcom based on The Monkees TV series and the Beatles' A Hard Day's Night film. The project was sponsored by Ford Motor Company. Go-Set reporters documented the making of the pilot, Once Upon a Twilight, including photos of the group around Melbourne with co-stars, comedian Mary Hardy (band's secretary) and Ronnie Burns. However, Ford withdrew their support and Spry was unable to find another sponsor – the project was shelved. Meanwhile all members of the Twilights joined a one-off studio group, Pastoral Symphony, to release a cover version of "Love Machine" (May 1968); additional vocalists were Ronnie Charles (of the Groop), Johnny Hawker and Terry Walker (of the Strangers). The single, written by Americans Michael Z. Gordon and James Griffin, reached No. 10.

Music intended for the TV series' soundtrack became the Twilights' second studio album, Once Upon a Twilight (June 1968). According to Australian musicologist Ian McFarlane, "[their] singles fared poorly, as did their second album." Nimmervoll felt "[they] had lost their momentum, replaced in people's hearts by the new crop of artists. Not one song from the album was released as a single." The group's eleventh single, "Always", recorded during the same sessions had appeared in May and reached No. 40. Spry quit as manager in mid-year due to their dissatisfaction with his other competing business interests. The six-piece's declining chart positions, signalled a downturn in their fortunes.

Nevertheless, 1968 was the band's peak year as a performing unit. They were one of the first Australian bands to utilise British-made Marshall amplifiers (as used by Jimi Hendrix), which delivered a powerful sound together with their impeccable presentation and tight musicianship. On the 1968 Go-Set pop poll they were listed as Australia's Top Group. The Twilights' shows included comedy and slapstick elements: Shorrock adopted an alter-ego, "Superdroop", dressing in a shabby super-hero jumpsuit (as in the "Cathy Come Home" film clip). Alongside original material they provided popular Motown and soul tunes and performed cover versions of recent chart hits. Their next single, "Tell Me Goodbye" / "Comin' on Down" (August 1968), was recorded at Armstrong's Studios in Melbourne – it was their last with MacKay producing – but was largely ignored by radio and the public and did not reach the top 40.

By late 1968 internal frictions were growing—the members were tired of continual live performances; sometimes five in a night. Their final single, "Sand in the Sandwiches" (November 1968), which was produced by New Zealander, Howard Gable, attempted to deliver a jaunty "let's all head off for the beach" theme but failed to achieve the interest of their audiences. Glenn A. Baker later described it as "abysmal". By contrast, its B-side, "Lotus", showcased the band's strengths, but gained little airplay.

=== 1969: Breakup ===
The final break occurred early in 1969: a second UK trip was abandoned as Pryor was unable to participate and resigned. The rest of the members decided to disband, announcing in Go-Set on 22 January that they would undertake final appearances in Sydney and Melbourne. Their last NSW concert was at Sydney Trocadero alongside a line-up of the Groove, Johnny Farnham, the Dave Miller Set, the La De Da's and the Executives, with compères Ward Austin and Dal Myles. Five thousand fans attended, with thousands turned away. Their last Melbourne concert was at Bertie's Discotheque.

McFarlane summarised, "In terms of style, musicianship and songwriting ability (if not success), Adelaide's favourite sons the Twilights were the closest thing Australia had to overseas role models." AllMusic's Richie Unterberger observed, "[they] were not especially innovative, but played competent, harmony-driven British Invasion-styled rock, strongly recalling both the 'beat' and pseudo-psychedelic era Hollies." While Nimmervoll concluded, "[they] represent an important and spectacular turning point in Australian music, the bridge between that time when Australian music was happy to reflect international moods and tends, and the point where, more and more, Australian music was beginning to take on a distinct character of its own."

=== Post break-up ===
Their two studio albums were re-released on EMI's budget label Music for Pleasure. A live album, Twilight Time Live, appeared in 1983, which was followed by Raven Records' CD anthology The Way They Played (1989), compiled and annotated by Baker. In 2006, Aztec Music released a remastered CD version of Once Upon a Twilight, comprising both mono and stereo mixes of the original LP. After Spry left the Twilights he concentrated on managing the Groove and his booking agency, AMBO (Australian Musicians Booking Organisation), which had been established in 1967 with fellow managers Darryl Sambell, Bill Joseph, Jeff Joseph and Don La Roche. Shorrock briefly worked as a manager for Brisbane teen-pop group the Avengers and at AMBO. In late 1969, following the split of the Groop, Brian Cadd and Don Mudie invited Shorrock to join them as lead singer of Axiom; they recorded two albums and several hit singles before splitting in 1971. Shorrock was a founding member of Little River Band during 1975–1982 and 1987–1996; he also had a successful solo career.

Britten became a freelance songwriter and producer, working for Australian acts including Zoot and Ronnie Burns. He returned to England to form Quartet in 1969 with Peek, Alan Tarney and Trevor Spencer (ex-James Taylor Move). They released a single, "Now" on Decca before disbanding. He later wrote hits for Cliff Richard, Tina Turner, Michael Jackson and Australian singer Christie Allen. Pryor was the drummer for a progressive rock band Healing Force with Charlie Tumahai in early 1971 before joining Chain during 1971 to 1972; he then undertook various studio sessions. Laurence Keith Pryor died on 19 May 2010, aged 63, after an illness. Brideoake returned to Adelaide in 1969 and began studying composition with Richard Meale at the Elder Conservatorium of Music, University of Adelaide. He began teaching at the conservatorium in 1975.

=== Reunions ===
Aside from Pryor, who was too ill, the final line-up of Brideoake, Britten, Bywaters, McCartney and Shorrock reunited for two Beatles tribute concerts, All You Need Is... the Beatles, in Adelaide in November 2000. The Twilights were joined on stage by Adelaide Symphony Orchestra, Doc Neeson and Ross Wilson. The band reformed again for the Long Way to the Top national concert tour in 2002 after having appeared on the TV documentary series of the same name for "Episode 2: Ten Pound Rocker 1963–1968", which was broadcast on Australian Broadcasting Corporation on 15 August 2001.

On 28 March 2014 Bywaters was the first inductee of the South Australian Music Hall of Fame. On 10 October 2014 Shorrock was inducted, while McCartney, Brideoake and Britten followed in April 2015. The surviving Twilights reunited for an all-star Rock of Ages concert promoted by Aztec Music at the Palais Theatre, Melbourne in 2011. Peter Arthur Brideoake (born 1945) died on 4 February 2022, aged 76.

== Personnel ==
Credits:

- Frank Barnard – drums (1964–1965)
- Peter Brideoake – rhythm guitar, backing vocals (1964–1969, died 2022)
- John Bywaters – bass guitar (1964–1969)
- Clem "Paddy" McCartney – lead vocals (1964–1969)
- Kevin Peek – lead guitar (1964, died 2013)
- Glenn Shorrock – lead vocals (1964–1969)
- Terry Britten – lead guitar, vocals (1964–1969)
- Laurie Pryor – drums (1965–1969, died 2010)

== Discography ==
=== Albums ===
- The Twilights (December 1966) – EMI/Columbia Records (33OSX-7779) [1968 reissue by Music for Pleasure, (MFP-8129)], [1996 CD reissue by EMI (8 55272 2)]
- Once Upon a Twilight (June 1968) – EMI/Columbia Records (OSX-7870 mono, SECO 7870 stereo)
- Best of The Twilights (compilation 1969) – His Master's Voice (OELP-9777)
- The Twilights: The Way They Played (compilation 1978) – EMI [1989 Raven reissue, 1996 Raven CD reissue (RVCD-03)]
- Twilight Time live (live album, 1983) – Raven RVLP-08

=== Extended plays ===
- Bad Boy (1966) – Columbia Records (SEGO-70129)
- Needle in a Haystack (1967) – Columbia Records (SEGO-70139)
- Always (1968) – Columbia Records (SEGO-70161)

=== Singles ===
- "I'll Be Where You Are" / "I Don't Know Where The Wind Will Blow Me" (June 1965) – Columbia (DO 4582) AUS KMR: No. 66
- "Come on Home" (October 1965) – Columbia (DO 4610) AUS KMR: No. 95
- "If She Finds Out" / "John Hardy" (February 1966) – Columbia (DO 4658) AUS KMR: No. 24
- "Baby Let Me Take You Home" (May 1966) – Columbia (DO 4685) AUS KMR: No. 75
- "Bad Boy" (June 1966) – Columbia (DO 4698)
- "Needle in a Haystack" (August 1966) – Columbia (DO 4717) AUS Go-Set: No. 1, AUS KMR: No. 2
- "You Got Soul" (December 1966) – Columbia (DO 4742) AUS Go-Set: No. 24, AUS KMR: No. 24
- "What's Wrong with the Way I Live" (February 1967) – Columbia (DO 4764) AUS Go-Set: No. 3, AUS KMR: No. 7
- "Young Girl" (May 1967) – Columbia (DO 4787) AUS Go-Set: No. 4, AUS KMR: No. 11
- "Bowling Brings out the Swinger in You" / "Bowling Brings out the Swinger in You" (instrumental version) – EMI Custom PRS 1736 (promotional single) 1967
- "Cathy Come Home" / "The Way They Play" (November 1967) Columbia (DO 5030) AUS Go-Set: No. 4, AUS KMR: No. 8
- "Always" (May 1968) – Columbia (DO 8361) AUS Go-Set: No. 40, AUS KMR: No. 36
- "Tell Me Goodbye" / "Comin' on Down" (August 1968) – Columbia (DO 8448) AUS KMR: No. 44
- "Sand in the Sandwiches" ( November 1968) – Columbia DO 8602)

== Awards and nominations ==
=== Go-Set Pop Poll ===
The Go-Set Pop Poll was coordinated by teen-oriented pop music newspaper, Go-Set and was established in February 1966 and conducted an annual poll during 1966 to 1972 of its readers to determine the most popular personalities.

Year	Nominee / work	Award	Result
1966	themselves	Best Australian Group	2nd
1967	themselves	Top Australian Group	2nd
1968	themselves	Best Australian Group	1st

=== South Australian Music Awards ===
The South Australian Music Awards have been presented by SA Music since 2012. The same organization is responsible for the South Australian Music Hall of Fame.

Year	Nominee / work	Award	Result	Ref.
2018	The Twilights	Hall of Fame	inductee	
