= Timeline of trends in Australian music =

The trend of Australian music have often mirrored those of the United States and United Kingdom. Australian Aboriginal music during the prehistory of Australia is not well documented.

== 1800s ==
Aboriginal music continued to be created and performed during this period.. There is evidence that Aboriginal music may have been influenced by contact with seafaring nations before European settlement.

Some Aboriginal music was documented by scientists and explorers like Lesesur and Freycinet. Surveyor Philip Chauncy transcribed examples of Aboriginal song possibly influenced by a generation of European settlement.

Rosendo Salvado and Isaac Nathan published music with Aboriginal titles which resembles their culture of origin, consequently transcriptions are regarded as 'filtered' by ear and notation.

The majority of populations in colonial settlements were born abroad or in transit. Consequently the music was mostly imported. Australians were initially in awe of European music training. It was not long before music was being written and composed by residents of the colonies. A generation after settlement, there were printing presses and pipe organs being installed. but British habits of publishing in London and printing in Leipzig were followed. We do well to remember that the recently united kingdom of Britain was allied and intermarried across Europe, especially Prussia. German composers like Hugo Alpen, Raimund Pechotsch, Karl Linger, Julius Herz, Augustus Juncker found welcome.

Staples of colonial composition included Waltz, Quadrille, Polka, Galop, Gavotte. British culture at the time favoured minimalist salon music, and this is reflected in Australian fondness for piano accompanied vocal Ballads.

== 1910s ==
The year 1900 deserves a special mention for several reasons. The silver Jubilee of Queen Victoria, celebrating the safe return of South Africa to the empire and Australian troops from the Boer war. Most importantly Edmund Barton, supported by crown representative Lord Brassey, formed the federation of the colonies into a single nation. Until this time, New South wales housed the colonial censorship office and all published material carried the mark 'Entered at Stationers Hall'. The Commonwealth of Australia formed a single archive.

The newly formed states no longer imposed tax on each other. Unfortunately, once independent the nation was no longer sovereign British territory for copyright purposes. This became important as Australia reached populations attractive as a return leg of performing arts on [English speaking] 'world' tours. Entrepreneurs began operating regular chains of theatres and performances. The Fuller Brothers represented UK companies. American J.C.Williamson managed USA contracts. Others like Rickards, Musgrove, Nicholson etc blended these with their own material.

Australia followed a worldwide trend for serious art music to separate away from more affordable and accessible forms of entertainment. Variety theatre or 'Tivoli' became a Household Australian term, equivalent to British Vaudeville Music-Hall and American Broadway musical. This was an expansive period, a golden age of live entertainment which came under threat from changes in technology - radio, phonograph and talkies all caused a drastic fall in demand in domestic music production by the end of the decade.

During this period the ubiquitous waltz began losing its primacy as the leading rhythm in dance halls The fox-trot, barn dance, tango, mazurka were found.

== 1960s ==
Still strongly reflecting American culture, in 1962 Australia experienced the Twist fad, soon followed by the Stomp fad (reflecting surf culture, which came to Australia through the Americans a few years before). In 1964, one of the biggest bands of this genre, the Beach Boys toured Australia. Other American acts also toured - rock and roll was still quite popular there - but very few American acts were just as successful.

More and more Australians were buying television sets, which gave the four television networks - Seven, Nine, Ten and ABC - an opportunity to air its own music show. In music shows of the 1950s and 1960s, every single song on the show was performed live in a small studio in front of an audience of 300 at the most, and they were nearly always teenagers.

Rick Springfield's success began in 1962 and peaked in 1981 to 1983.

The British invasion, which started with The Beatles, swept through Australia with many British acts being considered alternatives to the American ones. When the Beatles toured Australia in 1964, there were fans running to meet them everywhere. They performed to sell-out crowds in Sydney, Melbourne, Brisbane, Adelaide and Perth. The Rolling Stones also toured Australia in 1965, again to sellout crowds. But American singers still came to Australia for tours - Bob Dylan in 1966. The mid-1960s saw the 'mod' fad, which had been popular in Britain, come and go.

Most of the Australian acts of the 1960s were influenced by the British acts, which were more common and thus more exposable, than the American acts and so most of the Australian songs of the decade were recorded in British styles of music. However, there were some Australians who were willing to stay Americanized and record surf rock, or rock and roll songs (although for the latter genre, the Rolling Stones and the Beatles would have been bigger influences than the US acts of the 1950s).

Because of its small population at the time, not every Australian singer could be signed to an Australian label the traditional way (via a demo). So to pursue their dreams of becoming music stars, they had to enter talent shows. The winner of each talent show would get the chance to travel to Los Angeles, New York or London and be signed to a major British or American recording label. Olivia Newton-John and Helen Reddy were two of these singers, with Newton-John moving to London and performing songs with fellow Australian singer Pat Carroll. The Bee Gees, influenced by the big bands of the 1940s and 1950s also had to go on a talent show before they could start their recording careers. They became extremely successful in this style of music.

A cover of The Coasters' "Poison Ivy" (also covered by the Rolling Stones) gave Billy Thorpe & the Aztecs, a surf rock band, their first #1 hit, keeping even the Beatles at bay. (Creswell & Fabinyi, 1999) 1964 also saw Jimmy Little have a hit with "Royal Telephone" - he was the first indigenous Australian to do so. (Creswell & Fabinyi, 1999)

The Seekers had two Hot 100 top 5 hits, the #4 hit "I'll Never Find Another You" in May 1965 and the #2 hit "Georgy Girl" in February 1967, plus several smaller hits.

In 1966, Australia's prestigious (but quite Anglicized) annual rock band competition, Hoadley's Battle of the Sounds began, and this ran until 1972.

By 1966, the Loved Ones (through "The Loved One") and the Easybeats (through "Friday on my Mind")had both seen success. Johnny Young was host of Young Talent Time and the Seekers became the first Australian band to sell over a million records internationally. (Creswell & Fabinyi, 1999) Their best known songs were "Georgy Girl" and "The Carnival is Over". The last three mentioned bands all list British bands as their influences (to some extent).

Pop paper Go-Set was also launched this year (1966), hosting their own televised pop awards (the Pop Poll).

== 1980s ==
The late 1970s and early 1980s saw the dominance of the hugely popular pub rock, typified by Mental As Anything, Matt Finish, Midnight Oil, The Angels, Cold Chisel and Icehouse. (See Australian Rock.)

Air Supply's huge success spanned 1980 to 1983.

In 1981, Men at Work's "Down Under" was hugely popular both domestically and in the U.S., with the single staying at #1 on the Billboard charts for 4 weeks in January to February 1983. INXS also experienced big success with "What You Need" reaching the U.S. top 5, and the band selling over 1.3 million copies of their Listen Like Thieves album. (Creswell & Fabinyi, 1999)

The launch of MTV in America in 1981 ensured that Australians were exposed to the new generation of musical acts - and video clips - produced in the Northern Hemisphere. By 1983 Australian musical acts were making the transition from regular live performances to making promotional video clips - some acts for all of their singles.

In 1984, Midnight Oil's charismatic lead singer Peter Garrett ran for parliament with the Nuclear Disarmament Party. In the end Garrett narrowly missed out on winning a senate seat. In the mid-1980s, politics and music were increasingly entwined - the 1985 Live Aid concert was huge. Midnight Oil's Diesel and Dust album, featuring the "Beds Are Burning" single, broke the band in the US.

The mid 1980s also saw the arrival of dance music and the synthesiser, for example Rockmelons and Pseudo Echo who topped the Australian charts for 7 weeks with 'Funky Town'.

There was a sudden burst of interest in female singer/songwriters in the late 1980s, with Kate Ceberano, Wendy Matthews and Jenny Morris (actually a New Zealander) being popular. In 1987, Kylie Minogue hit the pop charts with a bang, "Locomotion" becoming the biggest selling Australian single of the decade and #2 in the UK, #3 in the US.

Split Enz split up and Neil Finn formed Crowded House. In 1987 "Don't Dream It's Over" peaked at #2 in the US.

Alternative music was well represented during the 1980s, with the formation of bands such as, The Birthday Party, the Hoodoo Gurus, The Cruel Sea and TISM.

It has been said that Madonna and Michael Jackson, American singers who were both quite popular in Australia during this time, are major influences for Australian music from the 1980s onwards: in terms of the topics of the songs (nearly every song recorded since 1990 are related to love), the video clips, and the actual styles of music.

== 1990s ==
The 1990s saw the continued expansion and then popularity of alternative music. It also saw a renaissance in music festivals, with some dozen or more being established and holding their own. Several expanded to cover multiple cities (Homebake, Big Day Out, Livid). The trend was kicked off by the establishment of the Big Day Out in 1992 in Sydney. Grunge had become huge in Australia after the death of Nirvana's Kurt Cobain in 1994, and Silverchair were the chief beneficiaries, with huge success both locally and within the US (1996).

Alternative going mainstream was confirmed in 1994, when the Cruel Sea dominated the ARIA Music Awards with their album The Honeymoon Is Over. Nick Cave experienced wider commercial success, and You Am I had three successive albums debut at #1. Other stalwarts of the 1990s have been Regurgitator, Magic Dirt and Spiderbait.

The baby boomer's rock scene, by the 1990s, translated into adult contemporary, with Wendy Matthews, Daryl Braithwaite and the Screaming Jets finding success.

In the late 1990s, pop broke out all over. Savage Garden hit the US#1 with their single "Truly Madly Deeply" and their debut album sold over 8 million copies. (Creswell & Fabinyi, 1999) Tina Arena and Natalie Imbruglia also had big chart success.

The 1990s also saw a rise in popular Australian music and videos for young children, particularly The Wiggles and Hi-5.

Triple J's influence in possible success for a band was clearer than ever, with the station breaking Grinspoon, Missy Higgins and largely responsible for promoting the Whitlams, who after winning Triple J's Hottest 100 poll in 1997 with their "No Aphrodisiac", went on to win Song of the Year at the 1998 ARIA music awards.
