= Max Merritt and the Meteors (album) =

Studio album by Max Merritt and the Meteors
- Released: 1969
- Recorded: 1969
- Genre: Pop/Rock
- Label: RCA Records
- Producer: Ron Wills

Max Merritt and the Meteors chronology
Max Merritt's Meteors (1965)	Max Merritt and the Meteors (1969)	Take It Greasy (1970)

Max Merritt and the Meteors is the third album from the band of the same name, which had moved to Australia from New Zealand in the mid-1960s. The band worked the live pub circuit in Melbourne in the late 1960s and this album was recorded in 1969 at Armstrong Studios with Ron Wills producing.

The best charting single from the LP, released in late 1969, was "Western Union Man", which peaked nationally at number 13. The album itself reached number 8 on the Australian album charts in 1970.

== Track listing ==
1. "Western Union Man" (Gamble-Huff-Butler)
2. "Fannie Mae" (Glascoe-Lewis-Levy)
3. "To Be a Lover"
4. "Louisiana Ana"
5. "You Touch Me"
6. "Been Away too Long" (Merritt)
7. "Home Is Where the Heart Is" (Merritt)
8. "I'm Just Wasting Time"
9. "Turkish Bath" (Bertles)
10. "Lay a Little Love on Me"
11. "Can't Come Back"

== Charts ==
=== Weekly charts ===
Chart (1970)	Peak position
Australia (Kent Music Report)	8

=== Year-end charts ===
Chart (1970)	Peak position
Australia (Kent Music Report)	24
