= Sharkmouth =

Studio album by Russell Morris
- Released: 12 October 2012
- Recorded: 2011–2012
- Genre: Rock, blues
- Length: 44:07
- Label: Fanfare, Ambition Records
- Producer: Mitch Cairns

Russell Morris chronology
Wild Bulls and Horses (2011)	Sharkmouth (2012)	The Very Best of Russell Morris (2013)

Sharkmouth is a studio album by Australian singer–songwriter Russell Morris. It was released on 12 October 2012 by Fanfare, Ambition Records. The album was presented to all the major labels who declined to release it. It peaked at No. 6 on the ARIA Albums Chart to become Morris' first top ten album and the highest selling album of his career.

Sharkmouth is based on stories from Australia's Depression years and some of their colourful characters, like boxer Les Darcy, gangsters of the 1920s and 1930s like Squizzy Taylor and, from the 1940s, Arthur Stace and horse Phar Lap. A Making of Sharkmouth DVD was released on 15 November 2013.

== Background ==
In an August 2013 interview with Michael Smith of TheMusic.com.au, Morris recalled: "I originally did four tracks, 'Blackdog Blues', 'Ballad of Les Darcy', 'Big Red' and 'Sharkmouth' – and I thought I'd see if anyone was interested. We did the rounds and went to all the record companies, and all of them said no." Morris continued with the recording, "I went back offering not only the album but also the publishing on the album and my old publishing, on songs like 'Wings of an Eagle' and 'Sweet, Sweet Love', but they still declined to release it." Morris pressed 500 copies of the album and began performing it at gigs when Robert Rigby from Ambition Entertainment said he'd release it under the FanFare label.

The project was created after Morris had read about a 1920s gangster from Sydney, Shark Jaws. This was the driving force behind a desire to create an album including Australian characters from the 1920s and 1930s era. Mitch Cairns explains: "To our knowledge, most 'Australiana' characters have been portrayed in a traditional colonial folk sense, so we wanted to find a way to deliver the stories in a more mainstream vein whilst still placing them in a 'vintage era'. A blues style seemed to be the perfect fit!! We tried to keep the vibe of the album raw and honest with lots of textural instruments and sounds, but above all, it had to be simple and spacious. We are also very honoured to have some very special guests on the album, including Troy Cassar-Daley, Mark Lizotte and Renée Geyer." The album Sharkmouth has stories about Australian characters which are all moulded together in a melting pot of swinging shuffles and delta grooves.

== Accolades ==
At the ARIA Music Awards of 2013, the album was nominated for and won ARIA Award for Best Blues and Roots Album.

== Track listing ==
Standard edition
No.	Title	Writer(s)	Length
1.	"Black Dog Blues"	Morris, Jim Keays	3:33
2.	"The Big House"	Morris	2:44
3.	"The Ballard of Les Darcy"	Morris, Garry Paige	3:57
4.	"'Bout to Break"	Morris, Mitch Cairns	4:13
5.	"Sharkmouth"	Morris, Paige	4:00
6.	"Walk My Blues"	Morris, Paige	2:43
7.	"The Drifter" (featuring Renée Geyer)	Morris, Paige	4:14
8.	"Squizzy"	Morris	3:51
9.	"The Bridge"	Morris, Alan Howe	3:06
10.	"Money Dont Grow on Trees"	Morris	3:54
11.	"Big Red"	Morris, Paige	3:33
12.	"Mr Eternity"	Morris, Cairns	4:24
Total length:			44:07

== Personnel ==
- Acoustic Guitar, Electric Guitar, Resonator Guitar [Dobro] – Shannon Bourne
- Artwork By – Adam Miller
- Backing Vocals – Jerson Trinidad (tracks: 10), Steve Romig (tracks: 2, 4, 9, 10, 12)
- Banjo, Cello – Mark Lizotte (tracks: 8)
- Bass – Mitch Cairns
- Drums – Adrian Violi
- Electric Guitar [Solo] – Troy Cassar-Daley (tracks: 10)
- Harmonica – Chris Wilson (tracks: 7, 10, 12)
- Mastered by – John Ruberto
- Mixed by – David Carr
- Piano, Organ – James Black (tracks: 2, 9)
- Producer – Mitch Cairns
- Recorded By, Engineer – Mitch Cairns
- Vocals – Renée Geyer (tracks: 7), Russell Morris

== Charts ==
=== Weekly charts ===
Chart (2012–14)	Peak position
Australian Albums (ARIA)	6
Australian Artist Albums Chart (ARIA)	1

=== Year-end charts ===
Chart (2013)	Position
Australian Albums Chart	33
Australian Artist Albums Chart	10
Australian Jazz & Blues Albums Chart	1
Chart (2014)	Position
Australian Jazz & Blues Albums Chart	3
Chart (2015)	Position
Australian Jazz & Blues Albums Chart	7
Chart (2016)	Position
Australian Jazz & Blues Albums Chart	14
Chart (2017)	Position
Australian Jazz & Blues Albums Chart	27

== Certifications ==
Region	Certification	Certified units/sales
Australia (ARIA)	Platinum	70,000^{^}
^{^} Shipments figures based on certification alone.

== Release history ==
Region	Date	Format	Edition(s)	Label	Catalogue
Australia	12 October 2012	CD; digital download	Standard	FanFare, Ambition Records	FANFARE085
Australia	30 October 2012	Vinyl	Standard	FanFare, Ambition Records	FANFARE085V
Australia	15 November 2013	Compact Disc + DVD	Collectors Edition	FanFare, Ambition Records	FANFARE085S
