= Yesterdaydreams =

Studio album by Brian Cadd
- Released: December 1978
- Genre: Pop rock
- Label: Festival/Interfusion; Capitol
- Producer: Michael Stewart

Brian Cadd chronology
| Keep on Rockin' (1976) | Yesterdaydreams (1978) | Best of Brian Cadd (1979) |

Singles from Yesterdaydreams
- 1. "Yesterdaysdreams" Released: October 1978; 2. "Skating on Thin Ice" Released: April 1979

Yesterdaydreams is the fifth studio album by Australian singer-songwriter Brian Cadd. It was released in December 1978 by Festival Records/Interfusion Records in Australia and Capitol Records in North America.

== Background ==
Brian Cadd had relocated to Los Angeles in 1975 and signed with Capitol Records shortly after. He released White on White in 1976 with little success. He began working on his second Capitol album, Yesterdaydreams, shortly after. It appeared in December 1978 on Festival Records/Interfusion Records in Australia and Capitol Records in North America. Two singles were released from the album, "Yesterdaysdreams" (October 1978) and "Skating on Thin Ice" (April 1979).

In his 2010 autobiography, From This Side of Things, he said that the music for this album did not fit the production: the songs were written with a rock and roll flavour but were mixed to have more of a pop sound. He described it as "pop music on acid".

== Track listing ==
All tracks written by Brian Cadd except where noted.

Side A

1. "Yesterdaydreams" – 3:52
2. "Ol' 55" (Tom Waits) – 4:14
3. "Skating on Thin Ice" – 3:19
4. "Thousand Different Ways" – 3:36
5. "Pale Fire" – 3:30

Side B

1. "Next Time I See You" – 2:59
2. "Send in the Violins" – 3:37
3. "Long Time Till The First Time" – 4:06
4. "Crazy Lady of the Silver Spoon" – 3:26
5. "Lonely is the Roadrunner" – 4:16

== Personnel ==
- David Winteur, Mike Porcaro, Reggie McBride – Bass
- Alvin Taylor, Doug Lavery, Jeff Porcaro, Richie Hayward – Drums
- David Kalish, John Beland, Richard Bennett, Stephen Beckmeier – Guitar
- Brian Cadd, Larry Knechtel, Mark T. Jordan, Mike Finnigan, Mike Moran – Keyboards
- Davey Johnstone – Mandolin
- J.D.Mannis – Pedal Steel Guitar
- Oliver C. Brown – Percussion
- Jay Graydon – Synthesizer
