= Keep On Rockin' (Brian Cadd album) =

Greatest hits album by Brian Cadd
- Released: 1976
- Genre: Pop/Rock, Classic rock
- Label: J&B Records

Brian Cadd chronology
White On White (1976)	Keep On Rockin' (1976)	Yesterdaydreams (1978)

Keep On Rockin' is the second greatest hits album by Australian singer-songwriter Brian Cadd. It was released in Australia in 1976 by J&B records. The album peaked at number 54 in the Australian Kent Music Report album charts in 1984.

== Track listing ==
Vinyl/Cassette (JB 180)

Side A

1. "Keep On Rockin'"
2. "Ginger Man"
3. "Every Mother's Son"
4. "Let Go"
5. "Show Me The Way"
6. "Silver City Birthday Celebration Day"
7. "Class Of '74"
8. "Moonshine"

Side B

1. "Alvin Purple"
2. "Gimme Gimme Good Lovin'"
3. "Boogie Queen"
4. "Heroes"
5. "Sweet Rock 'N' Roll"
6. "Spring Hill County Breakdown"
7. "Riverboat Lady"
8. "Fairweather Friend"

== Charts ==
Chart (1984)	Peak position
Australian Kent Music Report Albums Chart	54
