= Peter Brideoake =

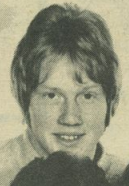
- Brideoake as a member of the Twilights circa 1968.

Background information
- Born: Peter Arthur Brideoake; 23 April 1945; Adelaide, South Australia
- Died: 4 February 2022 (aged 76) Adelaide, Australia
- Genres: Pop, classical, orchestral
- Occupations: Musician; composer; lecturer; songwriter
- Instruments: Guitar; harmonica; Chinese zither; vocals
- Years active: 1964–2022
- Labels: Columbia Records, EMI, Festival Records
- Formerly of: The Twilights; Australian Chamber Orchestra; Sydney String Quartet; The Seymour Group; Victorian String Quartet; Ryszard Pusz
- Website: www.australianmusiccentre.com.au/artist/brideoake-peter

Peter Arthur Brideoake (23 April 1945 - 4 February 2022) was an Australian musician, composer, singer, songwriter and lecturer. He gained national success in the 1960s as a member of the Twilights, for which he played guitar and wrote songs. The Twilights had eight consecutive national hit singles including "Needle in a Haystack" and "What's Wrong with the Way I Live". After the Twilights, Brideoake formally studied music and established himself as a multi-talented musician, composer and university lecturer.

Brideoake, as a member of the Twilights, was inducted into the South Australian Music Hall of Fame on 10 April 2015.

== Career ==
Peter Brideoake was born and educated in Adelaide, South Australia, on 23 April 1945. His musical career began as a rhythm guitarist and vocalist in popular Australian pop group the Twilights (1964 - 1969). At times, Brideoake co-wrote with Terry Britten and Glenn Shorrock. The Twilights officially broke up in 1969, but have played reunion or special concerts in 2000, 2002, 2011 and 2015.

In 1969, Brideoake commenced studies in music composition at the University of Adelaide. Following his graduation with a Bachelor of Music (Hons) he began teaching harmony and modern composition techniques. From 1975, he was a career lecturer at the Elder Conservatorium of Music in Adelaide.

After several periods of study in China, Brideoake became a proficient performer on the ancient Chinese zither (ch'in or guqin) instrument. In 1978, he was awarded the John Bishop Memorial Commission; other commissioned works have been composed for the Sydney String Quartet, the Australian Chamber Orchestra, the Seymour Group, the Victorian String Quartet and, more recently, by percussionist Ryszard Pusz.

== The Twilights ==
The musical career of Brideoake began in Adelaide, South Australia, as a rhythm guitarist and vocalist in the popular Australian pop group the Twilights (1964 - 1969) which reached the peak of their success in 1966. The Twilights consisted of Frank Barnard (drums 1964–65), Brideoake (rhythm guitar, vocals), Terry Britten (lead guitar, vocals), John Bywaters (bass, vocals), Clem "Paddy" McCartney (lead vocals), Laurie Pryor (drums 1965–69) and Glenn Shorrock (lead vocals). The Twilights earned acclaim for their body of recorded work, coupled with their status as arguably the most polished and accomplished Australian live act of the era.

=== Twilight' discography ===
- June 1965* "I'll Be Where You Are" / *"I Don't Know Where The Wind Will Blow Me" (Columbia Records DO-4582)
- Oct 1965* "Come On Home" / *"Wanted To Sell" (Columbia DO-4610)
- Feb 1966* "If She Finds Out" / *"John Hardy" (Columbia DO-4658)
- May 1966 "Baby Let Me Take You Home" / "You've Really Got A Hold On Me" (Columbia DO-4685)
- June 1966 "Bad Boy" / "It's Dark" (Columbia DO-4698)
- Aug. 1966 "Needle in a Haystack" / "I Won't Be The Same Without Her" (Columbia DO-4717)
- Dec. 1966 "You Got Soul" / "Yes I Will" (Columbia DO-4742)
- Feb 1967** "What's Wrong With The Way I Live" / "**9.50" (Columbia DO-4764)
- May 1967** "Young Girl" / "Time & Motion Study Man" (Columbia DO-4787)
- 1967 "Bowling Brings Out The Swinger In You" / "instr. version" (EMI Custom PRS 1736 – promo only)
- Nov 1967 "Cathy Come Home" / "The Way They Play" (Columbia DO-5030)
- May 1968 "Always" / "What A Silly Thing To Do" (Columbia DO-8361)
- Aug 1968 "Tell Me Goodbye" / "Comin' On Down" (Columbia DO 8448)
- Nov 1968 "Sand In The Sandwiches" *** / "Lotus" *** (Columbia DO-8602)

Singles produced by: David Mackay (producer)
Engineers: Roger Savage and David Page
Studios: Armstrong's Melbourne; AWA and EMI Sydney except:
First three singles self-produced in Adelaide *
Produced by Norman Smith at Abbey Road Studios London **
Produced by Howard Gable at Armstrong's Studios Melbourne ***

== Supergroup project ==
Pastoral Symphony, a "supergroup" project, issued a one-time studio release which was executive-produced by Jimmy Stewart and produced by Geoffrey Edelsten. A substantial hit upon its initial release, it was re-released in a barely noticeable US remix form in 1977. Pastoral Symphony comprised the full Twilights lineup augmented by Terry Walker (The Strangers) on lead vocals, Ronnie Charles (The Groop) doing backup vocals; and the Johnny Hawker Orchestra.

After the Twilights peak period (1964-1969), which included many recordings and performances (stage and television) around Australia, in New Zealand and the United Kingdom, the group disbanded and Brideoake returned to Adelaide in 1969.

== Beatles tribute concert ==
The Twilights reunited for a special Beatles tribute concert in Adelaide in 2000.

== "Long Way To The Top" concert tour ==
The Twilights reformed again for the hugely successful "Long Way To The Top" Australian concert tour in 2002.

== "Rock of Ages" concert ==
The surviving Twilights reunited for the all-star "Rock of Ages" concert promoted by Aztec Music at the Palais Theatre in St Kilda, Melbourne, in 2011.

== "Yesterday's Heroes" show ==
Brideoake and two other original members of the Twilights (John Bywaters and Paddy McCartney) were joined by guest singer / guitarist Peter Tilbrook (Masters Apprentices) to perform "Needle In A Haystack" at "Yesterday's Heroes", a various artists' show promoted by the Adelaide Music Collective in the Mortlock Chamber of the State Library on 9 February 2015 to coincide with a collection of Adelaide music memorabilia at the library.

== Education ==
=== Elder Conservatorium ===
After the Twilights main period (1964-1969), the band broke up and Brideoake returned to Adelaide. In 1969, he began studies in composition with Richard Meale at the Elder Conservatorium of Music at the University of Adelaide. Following his graduation with a Bachelor of Music (Hons) he began teaching harmony and modern composition techniques at the conservatorium.

== Academia ==
From 1975, Brideoake was a career lecturer at the Elder Conservatorium of Music in Adelaide for the next 27 years. As well as teaching in composition studies, he introduced a course in Chinese music as the result of an interest in the music, theatre and language of China. A special interest in an ancient Chinese zither (ch'in or guqin) meant that after several periods of study in China, he became a proficient performer on this instrument. In 1978, he was awarded the John Bishop Memorial Commission; other commissioned works have been composed for the Sydney String Quartet, the Australian Chamber Orchestra, the Seymour Group, the Victorian String Quartet and, more recently, by percussionist Ryszard Pusz.

== Music compositions ==
- Sonata for Flute and Piano (1969)
- Solo for 'Cello (1970)
- Music for Orchestra (1970)
- Composition for winds (1971)
- Gedatsu - solo guitar (1972)
- Music for Flute and Two Percussionists (1972)
- Chiaroscuro (1978)
- String Quartet No. 1 (1980)
- Interplay - two clarinets and harp (1981)
- Imager - string orchestra (1981)
- Shifting Reflections - chamber ensemble (1982)
- String Quartet No.2 (1986)
- Canto for Clarinet Alone (1987)
- Dialogue for Two - clarinet and percussion (1987)
- A Poet's Lament - soprano and piano (1988)

== Songwriting ==
Brideoake co-wrote some songs with Terry Britten and Glenn Shorrock during the Twilights era. In 2015, Peter Brideoake co-wrote " Situation Not Normal", a song based on the kidnap for ransom of fellow Australian Warren Rodwell.

== Personal life ==
Brideoake lived in Chengdu, Sichuan Province, in south west China from 2002 to 2009 before returning to his hometown of Adelaide. His memorial tributes show him as having two sisters and two sons.
