= Bulletproof (Dotter song) =

2020 single by Dotter

Single by Dotter
- Released: 22 February 2020
- Genre: Pop
- Length: 3:06
- Label: Warner Music Sweden
- Songwriter(s): Dino Medanhodzic; Johanna Jansson; Erik Dahlqvist

Dotter singles chronology
"I Do" (2019)	"Bulletproof" (2020)	"Backfire" (2020)

"Bulletproof" is a song by Swedish singer Dotter. The song was performed for the first time in Melodifestivalen 2020, where it finished in second place, one point below the winner. It peaked at number 2 on the Swedish Singles Chart.

== Charts ==
=== Weekly charts ===
Chart (2020)	Peak position
Sweden (Sverigetopplistan)	2

=== Year-end charts ===
Chart (2020)	Position
Sweden (Sverigetopplistan)	45

== Certifications ==
Region	Certification	Certified units/sales
Sweden (GLF)	Platinum	8,000,000^{†}
^{†} Streaming-only figures based on certification alone.
