= Moonshine (Brian Cadd album) =

Studio album by Brian Cadd
- Released: August 1974
- Recorded: Bill Armstrong Studios, Melbourne
- Genre: Pop, rock
- Label: Bootleg Records
- Producer: Brian Cadd

Brian Cadd chronology
Parabrahm (1973)	Moonshine (1974)	The Magic of Brian Cadd (1975)

Singles from Moonshine
- 1. "Let Go / Think It Over" Released: August 1974; 2. "All in the Way / Boogie Queen" Released: December 1974; 3. "Gimme Gimme Good Lovin' / Fire at Shepherd's Flat" Released: May 1975

Alternative cover
- International version

Moonshine is the third studio album by Australian singer-songwriter Brian Cadd. It was released in Australia in August 1974 by Bootleg Records and on Chelsea Records internationally.

The album peaked at number 11 in the Australian Kent Music Report album charts. It was certified gold in Australia in November 1974.

At the 1974 Australian Radio Records Awards, the album won Best Male Vocal Album. This was the third consecutive year Cadd won the award.

Professional ratings
Review scores
Source	Rating
AllMusic	3/5 stars

== Track listing ==
All tracks written by Brian Cadd

Side A

1. "Think It Over" - 3:42
2. "Let Go" - 4:18
3. "Moonshine" - 2:54
4. "Sweet Rock 'N' Roll" - 4:47
5. "Fire At Shepards Flat" - 4:00

Side B

1. "All In The Way (They Use My Face)" - 4:03
2. "Mr. Music" - 4:05
3. "Song For Wendy" - 2:16
4. "Spring Hill County Breakdown" - 3:12
5. "I Need Love" - 4:15
6. "Rich Man (Poor Man, Beggar Man)" - 5:12

== Charts ==
Chart (1974/75)	Peak position
Australian (Kent Music Report)	11

== Certifications ==
Region	Certification	Certified units/sales
Australia (ARIA)	Gold	20,000^{^}
^{^} Shipments figures based on certification alone.
