= Wild Bulls and Horses =

Studio album by Brian Cadd and Russell Morris
- Released: 27 June 2011
- Recorded: Point Blank Studio, Sydney, 2011
- Genre: Country rock
- Label: Caddmann Enterprises / MGM
- Producer: Brian Cadd

Brian Cadd chronology
Live at the Con (2007)	Wild Bulls and Horses (2011)	The Story of Sharky and the Caddman (2013)

Russell Morris chronology
The Greatest Hits (2008)	Wild Bulls and Horses (2011)	Sharkmouth (2012)

Wild Bulls and Horses is a collaborative studio album by ARIA Award winning artists and ARIA Hall of Fame inductees, Brian Cadd and Russell Morris. The album was released on 27 June 2011.

The songs were written and intended to go to Nashville for other performers to record but Cadd and Morris decided to record them themselves. The album was met with high acclaim.

== Track listing ==
Standard edition
No.	Title	Writer(s)	Length
1.	"I'm in Love Again"	Brian Cadd, John Beland, Russell Morris	3:54
2.	"Rodeo Girls"	Cadd, Morris	3:09
3.	"Big Red Sunset"	Cadd, Morris	3:15
4.	"Last to Know"	Cadd, Morris	4:05
5.	"Wild Bulls and Horses"	Cadd, Morris	3:42
6.	"All the Young Ladies"	Cadd, Morris	4:12
7.	"She Left Too Soon"	Cadd, Morris	3:43
8.	"Camels Back"	Cadd, Morris	3:36
9.	"The Man Who Wasn't There"	Cadd, Morris	3:16
10.	"Way With Me"	Cadd, Morris	3:34
11.	"Heart Highway"	Cadd	3:51
12.	"One More Night"	Cadd, Morris	4:07
13.	"The Wheel"	Cadd, Morris	3:26

== Release history ==
Region	Date	Format	Edition(s)	Label	Catalogue
Australia	1 July 2011	CD	Standard	Caddmann Enterprises / MGM	CDMN004

== Credits ==
- Acoustic Guitar, Electric Guitar, Mandolin, Harmonica – John Beland
- Bass – James Gillard
- Drums, Percussion – Mick Skelton
- Mastered By – Rupert Coffey
- Mixed By – Jack Guy (tracks: 1, 2, 4, 11, 12), Sam Hannan (tracks: 3, 5 to 10, 13)
- Piano, Keyboards – Brian Cadd
- Recorded By [Drums And Bass] – Daniel Denholm
