= Bulletproof (2020 film) =

- Poster
- Directed by: Todd Chandler
- Produced by: Todd Chandler; Danielle Varga
- Cinematography: Emily Topper
- Edited by: Todd Chandler, Shannon Kennedy
- Music by: Troy Herion
- Release date: 2020
- Country: United States

Bulletproof is a 2020 American documentary film directed by Todd Chandler, produced by Danielle Varga, and edited by Todd Chandler and Shannon Kennedy. The film explores the culture of fear that has developed at schools as a response to the perceived threat of school shootings and the industry that has developed to market products to secure schools. Filmed in High Ridge, MO, Texas City, TX, La Marque, TX, East Palo Alto, CA, Commerce City, CO, Chicago, IL, Pittsburgh, PA, Washington DC, New York, NY, Los Angeles, CA, it was released June 21, 2020 in the United States.

== Awards and nominations ==
Award	Year	Category	Recipient	Result	Ref.
Cinema Eye Honors Awards, US	2021	Outstanding Achievement in Original Music Score	Troy Herion	Nominated	
Docville	2021	Best International Documentary	Todd Chandler	Nominated	
Dokufest International Documentary and Short Film Festival	2020	International Dox Award	Todd Chandler	Nominated	
Gimli Film Festival	2020	Grand Jury Prize	Todd Chandler	Nominated	
Hot Docs Canadian International Documentary Festival	2020	Emerging International	Todd Chandler	Won	
Hot Docs Canadian International Documentary Festival	2020	Filmmaker Award	Todd Chandler	Won	
Hot Docs Canadian International Documentary Festival	2020	Best International Documentary	Todd Chandler	Nominated	
Philadelphia Film Festival	2020	Best Documentary Feature	Todd Chandler	Nominated	
SXSW Film Festival	2020	SXSW Grand Jury Award	Todd Chandler	Nominated	
