= Bulletproof Heart =

Bulletproof Heart may refer to:

- Bulletproof Heart (album), 1989 album by Grace Jones
- Bulletproof Heart (film), 1995 Canadian-American film
- "Bulletproof Heart" (song), 2011 song by My Chemical Romance
