= Axiom (band) =

Australian rock band

- Origin: Melbourne, Victoria, Australia
- Genres: Country rock, rock
- Works: Discography
- Years active: 1969–1971
- Labels: Parlophone/EMI; Warner
- Spinoff of: The Twilights; The Groop; Cam-Pact; The Valentines
- Past members: Brian Cadd; Doug Lavery; Don Mudie; Glenn Shorrock; Chris Stockley; Don Lebler

Axiom were an Australian country rock band formed in May 1969. Founding mainstays were Brian Cadd on lead vocals and piano, Don Mudie on bass guitar (both ex-The Groop), Glenn Shorrock on lead vocals (ex-The Twilights) and Chris Stockley on lead guitar (ex-Cam-Pact). Don Lebler on drums (ex-the Avengers) replaced Doug Lavery (ex-The Valentines) in the following year. They released two studio albums, Fool's Gold (June 1970) and If Only... (September 1971), but had disbanded before the latter appeared. Their top 10 singles are "Arkansas Grass" (1969), "A Little Ray of Sunshine" (1970) and "My Baby's Gone" (1971). Fool's Gold was listed in the book 100 Best Australian Albums (October 2010).

== History ==
Axiom formed in May 1969, as a consequence of the annual Hoadley's Battle of the Sounds, for which Australian artists performed for the prize of a trip to London. The Twilights were the inaugural winners in 1967, followed by the Groop in the following year. Both bands had difficulties upon return to the Australian music scene. The Groop broke up in May 1969, while the Twilights had split-up in January. The Twillights' lead singer Glenn Shorrock had become a manager for Brisbane group, the Avengers.

In Melbourne Brian Cadd of the Groop began canvassing fellow musicians to join a new country rock outfit. Initially, the Twilights' songwriter and guitarist Terry Britten was approached, who declined and returned to England. To form Axiom Cadd, on piano, lead vocals and songwriting, recruited his band mate Don Mudie on bass guitar and songwriting, and then Shorrock on lead vocals. The line-up was completed by Cam-Pact guitarist and singer Chris Stockley and the Valentines drummer Doug Lavery. Cited as a supergroup by Australian media, the members asked fans to suggest a name and chose Axiom.

After signing with EMI's Parlophone label, Axiom began recording. In Australia the group were signed to Ron Tudor's independent production company. In October 1969 they released their debut single, "Arkansas Grass", written by Cadd and Mudie, it is heavily influenced by the Band's album Music from Big Pink (1968). "Arkansas Grass" reached No. 7 on Go-Set's National Top 40 and No. 9 on the Kent Music Report singles chart. In the following January, Christobel Munson of The Canberra Times chose it as the best single of 1969 on the Australian scene. The title, together with its setting in the American Civil War, appealed to United States and international markets. According to Shorrock listeners thought the "grass" referred to marijuana, while Cadd described the song as a metaphor for the uselessness of Australian involvement in the Vietnam War.

Part-way through recording their debut album, Fool's Gold (June 1970), Lavery was replaced on drums by Don Lebler (ex-the Avengers). Axiom left Australia, with Tudor's approval, for United Kingdom in April 1970 after signing a publishing deal with Leeds Music – Australian press reported that they had received offers from Apple and Decca. The group had issued their second single, "A Little Ray of Sunshine" (March) – inspired by the birth of a divorcing couple's newborn child – which reached No. 5 on Go-Set's chart in May. Its charting was adversely affected by the 1970 radio ban, a "pay for play" dispute, which prevented commercial radio stations from playing certain British and Australian singles (during May to October) and due to Axiom's absence.

Notwithstanding the inclusion of "Arkansas Grass", Fool's Gold contained tracks detailing local scenes and issues. It was self-produced by the band's members, with engineering by Roger Savage and John Sayers. Tracks included early use of didgeridoo in popular music. Fool's Gold reached No. 18 on the Go-Set Top 20 Albums chart and No. 11 on the Kent Music Report in June, despite Axiom's absence. A third single failed to chart. Cadd later revealed that an album track "Ford's Bridge" had been re-written from "We Can Reach Georgia by Morning" as a compromise due to pressure initiated by radio DJ and Go-Set writer Stan Rofe:

"[Rofe] said that it was absolutely unconscionable for us to use Georgia and why couldn't we use an Australian name? So I succumbed to the browbeating of everybody, and we found in the atlas a place in Northern Queensland called Ford's Bridge... I never really got over that. It really hurt me... I just got very annoyed with the parochialism. When it reached out and touched me and made me change a word in a song." Brian Cadd quoted in Songwriters Speak: Conversations About Creating Music (2005).

In England, Axiom signed a three-year recording contract with Warners, which issued their next single, "My Baby's Gone" (January 1971), produced by Shel Talmy (Who, Kinks, the Easybeats), which peaked at No. 8 on the Go-Set National Top 60. The band's second album, If Only... (September), was recorded at Olympic Studios in London with Talmy and Glyn Johns producing. Australian musicologist Ian McFarlane found "[it's] a more polished album than Fool's Gold but it received little attention." Axiom had already broken up by the time it appeared. In an interview with Richie Unterberger in 2000, Talmy recalled:

"Super-duper band. It was a super album. Two weeks before the album was to be released on Warner, they decided to break up. And they did, and Warners said, 'Bye!! If you think we're promoting this album, you're out of your fucking minds!' I was real pleased with that album. It was fun to do, they were talented, the songs were great."

Shorrock remained in England and joined Esperanto as lead vocalist; he returned to Australia in late 1974 and joined a group, which became Little River Band in the following year. Cadd and Mudie formed a duo upon their return to Australia, which issued single, "Show Me the Way" (December 1971), which peaked at No. 17 on the Go-Set top 40 and No. 15 on the Kent Music Report. Cadd then undertook a solo career and also became a producer and songwriter for other artists. Don Lebler remained in the UK and joined the Mixtures. Stockley founded the Dingoes in 1973 in Melbourne. In October 2010 Fool's Gold was listed in the book 100 Best Australian Albums.

== Members ==
- Brian Cadd – vocals, piano
- Don Mudie – bass guitar
- Glenn Shorrock – vocals, guitar
- Chris Stockley – guitar
- Doug Lavery – drums
- Don Lebler – drums

== Discography ==
=== Albums ===
List of albums, with Australian chart positions
| Year | Album details | Peak chart positions |
| Year | Album details | AUS |
|---|---|---|
| 1970 | Fools Gold: Released: June 1970; Format: LP; Label: Parlophone Records (PCSO.7561) | 11 |
| 1971 | If Only...: Released: September 1971; Format: LP; Label: Warner Bros. Records (WS-3009) | 45 |
| 2004 | The Axiom Archive 1969-1971: Released: 15 July 2004; Format:CD (compilation album); Label: Raven Records/EMI (RVCD-137) | - |
"—" denotes the album failed to chart or was not released.

=== Extended plays ===
| Year | Album details |
|---|---|
| 1971 | The Axiom Hits: Released: 1971; Format: 7"; Label: Warner Bros. Records (EPW 201) |

=== Singles ===
| Title | Year | Peak chart positions | | Album |
| Title | Year | AUS Go-Set | AUS KMR | Album |
|---|---|---|---|---|
| "Arkansas Grass" | 1969 | 7 | 9 | Fool's Gold |
| "A Little Ray of Sunshine" | 1970 | 5 | 5 | Fool's Gold |
| "Father Confessor" | 1970 | – | 90 | If Only... |
| "My Baby's Gone" | 1971 | 8 | 8 | If Only... |
| "Fool's Gold" | 1971 | – | 71 | Fool's Gold |

== Awards and nominations ==
=== Go-Set Pop Poll ===
The Go-Set Pop Poll was coordinated by teen-oriented pop music newspaper Go-Set, and was established in February 1966 and conducted an annual poll during 1966 to 1972 of its readers to determine the most popular personalities.

| Year | Nominee / work | Award | Result |
|---|---|---|---|
| 1970 | themselves | Best Australian Group | 2nd |
| 1970 | Don Lebler | Best Australian Drummer | 9th |
| 1970 | Don Mudie & Brian Cadd | Best Australian Composer | 10th |
