= White on White (album) =

Studio album by Brian Cadd
- Released: September 1976
- Genre: Pop/rock
- Length: 43:20
- Label: Capitol
- Producer: Robert Appère

Brian Cadd chronology
'The Magic of Brian Cadd (1975)	White on White (1976)	Keep on Rockin' (1976)

Singles from Moonshine
- 1. "White on White Eldorado / Longest Night" Released: December 1976

White on White is the fourth studio album by Australian pop/rock singer-songwriter, Brian Cadd. It was released in September 1976 via Capitol Records with Robert Appère producing. White on White peaked at number 93 in the Australian Kent Music Report album charts in 1977.

== Background ==
Cadd arrived in Los Angeles in 1975 and began working on an album with Chelsea Records, but the company was forced into redundancy and Cadd lost his record deal. He signed with Capitol Records shortly after. This was his first major label signing. The album's cover contains the words written on a white background with toothpaste.

== Reception ==
Professional ratings
Review scores
Source	Rating
AllMusic	2.5/5 stars

Cash Box magazine said "Brian Cadd is a transplanted Australian who had gold records down there, but has just been matched with producer Robert Appere for his first album in the U.S. Drummer Nigel Olsson and bassist Dee Murray helped lay down the basic tracks with Brian on piano. The result is a superb debut album!"

Alex Henderson from AllMusic rated the album at two-and-a-half stars out-of five; he explained, "Favoring an approach that is somewhere between Elton John and Billy Joel, Cadd delivers an album that is generally decent but not mind-blowing. 'All in the Way (That They Use My Face),' 'White on White Eldorado,' and 'W.C. I See' are pleasant, catchy numbers, although one senses that Cadd was capable of more. In 1976, Capitol hoped that people who were into Elton John, Randy Newman and Billy Joel would get into Cadd as well. But White on White wasn't the hit that Cadd was hoping for."

== Track listing ==
All tracks written by Brian Cadd.

Side A

1. "Little White Lies" - 3:19
2. "No Answer" - 3:24
3. "Heavenly Night in September" - 3:31
4. "Good Night Princess" - 4:15
5. "Pass on the Road" - 4:34
6. "All in the Way (That They Use My Face)" - 3:09

Side B

1. "White on White Eldorado" - 3:17
2. "Ginger Man" - 3:26
3. "W.C. I See" - 4:20
4. "Dance, Dance, Dance" - 4:19
5. "Longest Night" - 5:46

== Charts ==
Chart (1977)	Peak position
Australian Kent Music Report Albums Chart	93

== Personnel ==
- Brian Cadd – vocals, piano
- Buzz Clifford, Carmen Twillie, Danny Moore, Kathy Collier, Mathew Moore, Peter Beckett, Steve Kipner, Jennette Gloud – backing vocals
- Dee Murray – bass guitar
- Nigel Olsson – drums
- Richie Zito, Steve Cropper, Ben Benay – guitar, banjo, Jew's harp
- Chuck Findley, Dick Hyde, Jackie Kelso, Jim Horn – horns
- Billy Payne, William Smith – keyboards
- Sneaky Pete – pedal steel guitar
- Gary Coleman – percussion
