= Brian Cadd (album) =

Studio album by Brian Cadd
- Released: November 1972
- Studio: Bill Armstrong's Studio, Melbourne
- Genre: Rock, pop
- Label: Bootleg Records
- Producer: Brian Cadd, John Sayers

Brian Cadd chronology
Brian Cadd (1972)	Parabrahm (1973)

Brian Cadd albums chronology
Yesterdaydreams (1978)	Best of Brian Cadd (1979)	No Stone Unturned (1985)

Alternate cover
- Best of Brian Cadd (1979)

Brian Cadd is the debut self-titled album by Australian musician Brian Cadd. It was released on the Bootleg Records label in 1972 and peaked at number 3 for three weeks on the Australian Go-Set chart. It contained the hit single "Ginger Man".

At the Federation of Australia Commercial Broadcasters awards of 1972, the album won Best Male Vocal Album.

The album was re-released in 1979 by Summit Records until the title Best of Brian Cadd.

== Track listing ==
All tracks composed by Brian Cadd

Side A

1. "Fairweather Friend" - 3:12
2. "Tell the World to Go Away" - 6:03
3. "Where the Music's Playing" - 4:12
4. "Josie McGinty" - 2:11
5. "Tell Me About Freedom Again" - 5:03

Side B

1. "Ginger Man" - 4:00
2. "Pappy's Got the Blues" - 4:00
3. "Silver City Birthday Celebration Day" - 3:59
4. "Suite for Life" - 5:20
5. "Every Mother's Son" (bonus track) - 3:47

== Charts ==
=== Weekly charts ===
Chart (1972/73)	Peak position
Australian Kent Music Report Albums Chart	3

=== Year-end charts ===
Chart (1973)	Peak position
Australia (Kent Music Report)	22
