= Bulletproof (Brian Cadd and the Bootleg Family Band album) =

Studio album by Brian Cadd and The Bootleg Family Band
- Released: 11 November 2016
- Recorded: 2014–2016
- Studio: Furstock Studio, Melbourne
- Genre: Rock music
- Label: Caddmann Enterprises / MGM
- Producer: Brian Cadd

Brian Cadd chronology
The Story of Sharky and the Caddman (2013)	Bulletproof (2016)

The Bootleg Family Band chronology
The Bootleg Family Band Extended Play (1976)	Bulletproof (2016)

Bulletproof is a collaborative studio album by Brian Cadd and Australian 1970s rock band The Bootleg Family Band. It was released in November 2016.

The album was promoted with a tour in November 2016.

== Background ==
In 1972, Australian songwriting Brian Cadd and Ron Tudor created a band of Melbourne's most seasoned musicians and anointed them The Bootleg Family Band. The group scored a couple of Top 10 hits in Australia with covers of Loggins and Messina’s "Your Mama Don't Dance" and Betty Everett’s "The Shoop Shoop Song". The band was renamed when Brian Cadd left for the United States in 1975 to pursue his solo career.

The idea to record an album first began in 2013, but it took three years to record. "It was mostly about getting back together with the actual Bootleg Family Band again, we decided to go into the studio for a few days and see what happened. The original vibe returned almost immediately and it was just like 40 years ago, Coxy still telling the same jokes he told back in 1973. It was funny and lovely." Brian said on the decision to reunite, record and tour.

The album celebrates a collection of previously unreleased songs Cadd had stored away, some that he had penned for and were previously recorded by other performers, and songs which were crafted in a studio. Cadd said "Most songwriters have a couple of songs that they’ve written for other artists that they’ve always felt they would have loved to have a go at themselves. As a solo artist I have always been expected to do ballads and story songs. Deep down where I live, it’s all rock n roll." The album is described as "a powerful, rollicking, rock n roll album that will transport listeners back to the live show sounds of Brian Cadd with his famous Bootleg Family Band."

In 2016, Cadd also celebrated his 50th year in the music business and 70th birthday.

== Reception ==
Jeff Jenkins from Stack Magazine said; "Cadd reclaims some songs originally recorded by other artists, including "Love Is Like a Rolling Stone" (The Pointer Sisters), "I Still Can't Believe It's True" (Joe Cocker) and "Yesterday Dreams" (Bonnie Tyler), and uncovers some new gems, including the beautifully boisterous "Long Time 'Till The First Time"... Bulletproof shows there's a lot of life left in Brian Cadd. In fact, I don't think he's made a better album; these songs have a spirit that can't be denied. Not bad for a bloke who's just turned 70. Bulletproof, indeed."

== Track listing ==
1. "Bulletproof" – 4:27
2. "I Still Can't Believe It's True" – 3:38
3. "Slow Walk" – 2:46
4. "Love Is Like a Rolling Stone" – 3:19
5. "Black Queen" – 5:02
6. "Long Time 'Till the First Time" – 4:07
7. "Yesterday Dreams" – 3:46
8. "The One That Got Away" – 3:58
9. "Catching It All On the Straightway" – 4:28
10. "Something Good's Gotta Turnaround" – 4:14
11. "Hell Outta Dodge" – 3:14
12. "On the Edge" – 3:33

== Release history ==
Region	Date	Format	Edition(s)	Label	Catalogue
Australia	11 November 2016	CD; DD	Standard	Caddmann Enterprises / MGM	CDMN006
