= Parabrahm (album) =

Studio album by Brian Cadd
- Released: October 1973
- Studio: Bill Armstrong's Studio, Melbourne
- Genre: Pop/Rock
- Label: Bootleg Records
- Producer: Brian Cadd

Brian Cadd chronology
Brian Cadd (1972)	Parabrahm (1973)	Moonshine (1974)

Singles from Parabrahm
- 1. "Keep on Rockin'" Released: October 1973

Parabrahm is the second studio album by Australian singer-songwriter Brian Cadd. It followed the success of his debut self-titled album. It was released in Australia in October 1973 by Bootleg Records and in the United States on Chelsea Records.

Parabrahm peaked at number 5 in the Australian album charts on 10 November 1973.

At the 1973 Australian Radio Records Awards, the album won Best Male Vocal Album.

== Track listing ==
All tracks written by Brian Cadd .

1. "Heroes" – 4:18
2. "Handyman" – 5:04
3. "Give Me a Present" – 2:41
4. "Matilda" – 4:36
5. "Keep on Rockin'" – 4:39
6. "Sweet Little Country Lady" – 4:13
7. "Too Young" – 2:50
8. "Kingston River Travellin' Man" – 3:10
9. "Riverboat Lady" – 3:35
10. "Little Old Country Lady" – 2:38

== Charts ==
Chart (1973/74)	Peak position
Australian Kent Music Report Albums Chart	6
