= Hoadley's Battle of the Sounds =

Australian music competition

Hoadley's Battle of the Sounds was an annual national rock/pop band competition held in Australia from 1966 to 1972. The winners of the national finals were the Twilights (1966), the Groop (1967), the Groove (1968), Doug Parkinson in Focus (main, 1969) and the Affair (vocal group, 1969), the Flying Circus (1970), Fraternity (1971) and Sherbet (1972).

== History ==
Australia's Battle of the Sounds was originally established by Australian tabloid magazine Everybody's in 1965 as a talent quest for new unsigned bands in Sydney, Melbourne, and Brisbane.

The National Battle of the Sounds gained significant credibility and attracted many of Australia's top pop outfits when, in 1966, confectioner Hoadley's assumed sponsorship and it took the full name of "Hoadley's Battle of the Sounds" for the first time. Go-Set magazine took over the co-ordination role and local radio stations all over Australia organised local heats. This turned it into a truly national competition. Heats were held in the capital cities and country towns and bands worked their way up through semi-finals to one penultimate grand-final, held in either Melbourne or Sydney. The South Australian finals were held at the Thebarton Theatre in the Adelaide suburb of Thebarton.

The valuable first prize was a full return passage to England on Sitmar Cruises, two booked concerts in London and $1000 prize money, later upped to $2000 and return flights to Los Angeles (early winners did not get the concerts).

1969 was the peak year of the battle with over 1000 bands entering and two Grand Finals, one for full bands and one for groups and singing groups that specialised in harmony vocals. Over the years the battle would see such quality acts as The Groove and Sherbet taking out the major prize. Many other prominent outfits that would go on to greater success competed in the Battle until its conclusion in 1972.

=== Reception ===
In July 1966 Canberra-based group the Roadrunners won the New South Wales final for country groups. The judges were radio and TV representatives and the audience cheering was so loud that they had to call back the band to perform again. The prizes for winning the national final were $1000, a trip to England and a recording contract. Another ACT group, Rain, won their heat in July 1968 and flew to the national final in Melbourne – they were farewelled at the airport by two fans. The national final winner, the Twilights, performed a medley: "Bad Boy", "Satisfaction", "Yesterday", "If she finds out" and "I'm not talkin", at Melbourne's Festival Hall. The tracks were later included on their album, Twilight Time (1983), via Raven Records.

Garry Raffaele of The Canberra Times noticed that three of the better local bands did not enter the competition in June 1969. He concluded that "Much of the criticism levelled against pop music generally is that it produces groups whose main ambition is to stir up audiences made up mainly of young teenage girls. If competitions like this one tend to perpetuate these values who can blame the musicians for throwing it all up and leaving it to the bubble-gum bands?"

In June 1971 Salty Dog, which had relocated to Sydney, won the Canberra heat as they "knew how to play to a seated audience; it knew it had to wake up our interest and it made us participate. It nearly had us out of our seats. The volume was up full, lively Les [Catterall] couldn't keep still, Digger beat tempestuously at the drums, Chris Willing played bass better than before heading for Sydney and Gunther and Scotty, both on lead guitars, couldn't help but join in and show how a group plays when it is enjoying itself." One of the judges was Raffaele. The national winners, Fraternity, had their set recorded – it appeared on Complete Sessions 1971–72 (1996) on Raven Records.

== Winners ==
=== National Battle of the Sounds: National Finalists: 1965 ===
Year	Winner	Region/State	Other Finalists	Venue
1965	The Crickets	Melbourne; Victoria	* Jimmy Crockett & The Shanes * The Pink Finks * The Showmen * The Rising Sons * Embers	Festival Hall; Melbourne

Note: The first Australian battle of the bands was in 1964. It was called the Everybody’s Magazine’s ‘Big New Sound of 1964’. It was unrelated to Hoadley's Battle of the Sounds, which was a rock band contest, that commenced under the name Hoadley's Battle of the Sounds in 1966.

The winners of Everybody’s Magazine’s ‘Big New Sound of 1964’ were the Green Hill Singers, from Melbourne, with their self-penned song "The Big Land." The first prize was 250 pounds, plus an EMI recording contract.

The members of the Green Hill Singers were John McMillan (acoustic guitar and vocals), Alex McMillan (acoustic guitar and vocals), Chris Bonett (upright bass and vocals) and Graeme Williams (organ). Jimmy Hannan was one of the judges, and the TV show final was televised nationally.

The Green Hill Singers worked in clubs and concerts in Sydney for a year or so before breaking up.

Sources: Chris Bonett, Warren Faheys Australian Folklore Unit Website, Everybody's Magazine 1964 (Mitchell Library, Sydney)

=== Hoadley's National Finalists: 1966-1972 ===
Year	Winner	Region/State	Second place	Third place	Other Place Getters	Venue
1966	The Twilights	Adelaide; South Australia	The Other Ends (Sydney N S W)	Chaos & Co (Tasmania)	* The Road Runners * The Breed * The Chosen Few * Trolls * The Modes * The Clique	Festival Hall; Melbourne
1967	The Groop	Melbourne; Victoria	The Questions (NSW)	The Flamingoes (Queensland)	* The Valentines * The Mystics * The Wanderers * Gus & The Nomads * James Taylor Move * J A Madison * Mickey Finn * J B J & The Originals	Festival Hall; Melbourne
1968	The Groove	Melbourne; Victoria	Masters Apprentices (South Australia)	Doug Parkinson In Focus (NSW)	* The Marksmen * Rain * Tol Puddle Martyrs * Shades of Blue * Beat 'n Tracks * Sect * Abstract Image * Black Orchids * J A Madison	Festival Hall; Melbourne
1969 (Main Grand Final)	Doug Parkinson in Focus	Melbourne; Victoria	Aesops Fables (NSW)	The Valentines (Victoria)	* The Avengers * Chain * Tin Pan Alley * Pepper Adams * Spice of Life * Sect * Limit * Proclamation * Clockwork Oringe * Chapter Three	Festival Hall; Melbourne
1969 (Vocal Group Grand Final)	The Affair	Sydney; NSW	Mark IV (Western Australia)	Travis Wellington Hedge (South Australia)	* The Chiffons * 1812 * New Edition	Festival Hall; Melbourne
1970	The Flying Circus	Sydney; NSW	Zoot (Victoria)	Autumn (NSW)	* Nova Express * Axis * Sweaty Betty * Ssarb * Musick Express * Maya * Chapter III * Jug Band * Sons of Bacchus * Noddys Crew	Capitol Theatre; Sydney
1971	Fraternity	Adelaide; South Australia	Sherbet (NSW)	Jeff St John and Copperwine (NSW)	* Bacchus * October * Langford Lever * Pendulum * Nutmeg * Jelly Roll Big Band * Impulse * Barrelhouse	Festival Hall; Melbourne
1972	Sherbet	Sydney; NSW	Jeff St John and Copperwine (NSW)	Headband (South Australia)	* Headband * Brandy * Jody	Capitol Theatre; Sydney

== See also ==
- Australian rock
- Timeline of trends in Australian music
- Abel Hoadley – founder of Hoadley's Confectionery Company and inventor of the famous Violet Crumble chocolate bar.
