= Brian Cadd =

Australian musician (born 1946)

- Born: Brian George Cadd; 29 November 1946 (age 79); Perth, Western Australia, Australia
- Genres: Country rock,rock; folk rock; folk
- Occupations: Singer; producer; songwriter; keyboardist; record label founder
- Years active: 1965–present
- Labels: Bootleg; Festival; Warner; Mushroom; Stallion
- Formerly of: The Groop; Axiom; the Bootleg Family Band; the Flying Burrito Brothers
- Website: briancadd.com

Brian George Cadd AM (born 29 November 1946) is an Australian singer-songwriter, musician, record producer and label founder. As well as working internationally throughout Europe and the United States, he has performed as a member of numerous bands the Groop, Axiom, the Bootleg Family Band and in America with the Flying Burrito Brothers before carving out a solo career since 1972.

Cadd produced fellow Australian acts Ronnie Burns, Broderick Smith, Tina Arena and Glenn Shorrock. He established his own record label, Bootleg. Cadd composed or performed music for films, Morning of the Earth (1972), Alvin Purple (1973), Alvin Purple Rides Again (1974), Fatal Vision (1983), The Return of the Living Dead (1985) and The Heartbreak Kid (1993) and for television Class of 74 (1974), The Midnight Special and Don Kirshner's Rock Concert. He wrote songs for other acts, Burns, the Masters Apprentices, the Bootleg Family Band, the Pointer Sisters, Little River Band and John Farnham.

In 2007, Cadd was inducted into the Australian Recording Industry Association (ARIA) Hall of Fame. He was installed as a Member of the Order of Australia in the Queens Birthday Honours in June 2018 for "significant service to the music industry as a singer, songwriter, performer, mentor and producer, and to professional associations."

== Early years ==
Brian George Cadd, was born and raised in Perth, Western Australia, and was a child prodigy: winning a TV talent quest when 12 and being offered his first professional job as a pianist for a children's TV program. His family relocated to Tasmania and then Melbourne, where Cadd became involved in jazz music of the early 1960s, playing with the Beale Street Jazz Band (Rick Mabin on trumpet, Frank Turner on drums) and then the Castaways. He was also recognised for his zany hats. By 1965, The Castaways became The Jackson Kings playing R&B, with Cadd on piano and Ronnie Charles on vocals they recorded two singles "Watch Your Step" and "Watermelon Man" by April 1966.

== Career ==
=== 1966–1969: The Groop ===
The Groop formed in Melbourne in 1964 and had recorded singles, an EP and an LP, before Cadd and Charles were asked to join in October 1966 along with guitarist Don Mudie. On advice from pop magazine Go-Set writer Ian "Molly" Meldrum, Cadd briefly changed his name to Brian Caine, before changing it back after his family protested. The new line-up was: Cadd, Charles, Mudie and Max Ross on bass and Richard Wright on drums.

The first single for this line-up was "Woman You're Breaking Me" (written by Cadd and Wright) which reached No. 6 in Melbourne and No. 12 in Sydney in July 1967.It was also a hit in parts of the US. Melbourne singer Ronnie Burns had a local hit with "When I Was Six Years Old" written by Cadd (who also produced) and Ross. The band won a trip to UK from the 1967 Hoadley's National Battle of the Sounds; publishers sent "When I Was Six Years Old" to England where it was recorded by Manfred Mann's lead vocalist Paul Jones.

The Groop arrived in UK as the single was released and managed to get a deal with CBS, then they toured there and in Germany. Band members had written most of their hits in Australia, but CBS decided they would cover an Italian ballad, "What's the Good of Goodbye", which failed to chart. The Groop returned to Australia by October 1968 and Ross left, they released two more singles, including "Such A Lovely Way" before disbanding in May 1969. Their last recorded work was an uncredited appearance as instrumental support on Russell Morris' No. 1 single "The Real Thing".

=== 1969–1971: Axiom ===
Following the break-up of The Groop, Cadd and Mudie formed Axiom in May 1969 with Glenn Shorrock (ex-The Twilights) on vocals, Doug Lavery (ex-The Valentines) on drums and Chris Stockley (ex-Cam-Pact) on guitar. Cadd and Mudie were the primary songwriters for Axiom including their three hit singles. They signed with EMI and released their debut single "Arkansas Grass" which reached No. 7 in December 1969, followed by "A Little Ray of Sunshine" at No. 5 in April 1970. Axiom travelled to England and attempted to enter the UK market but had no chart success. Then, relocating to the US, they released their single "My Baby's Gone" in January 1971, this was followed by their second album If Only... in September. However, Axiom had already disbanded by March and Cadd returned to Australia. Shorrock later became the lead singer for Little River Band and Stockley joined The Dingoes.

=== 1972–1975: The Bootleg Family Band, Brian Cadd, Parabrahm and Moonshine albums ===
Cadd and Mudie, as a duet, released "Show Me the Way" which reached No. 15 in early 1972. Cadd turned to producing other acts and recording solo material on his own Bootleg Records label which was set up under Ron Tudor's Fable Records. "Ginger Man" was the first single from Cadd's self-titled debut album, released in November 1972 on Bootleg Records. Bootleg was based along similar lines to US pianist Leon Russell's Shelter Records – signed artists recorded and toured together as a The Bootleg Family Band. Studio musicians used by Cadd became the Bootleg Family Band and had their own hit single by covering Loggins and Messina's "Your Mama Don't Dance", where Cadd provided lead vocals. Cadd also won the composer's section of Hoadley's Battle of the Sounds for 1972 with his song, "Don't You Know It's Magic", this became a top 20 hit for John Farnham (known then as "Johnny" Farnham). The song also won the 'Most Outstanding Composition' award at the Tokyo World Popular Song Festival, with Cadd performing there live. Cadd released a second album, Parabrahm, in 1973, and followed with the theme song and score for the 1973 movie Alvin Purple (Australia's first R-rated comedy) and its sequel Alvin Purple Rides Again in 1975. After releasing his third solo album, Moonshine, in 1974, Cadd left Australia for the US. Moonshine was certified gold in Australia by November 1974.

=== 1975–1979: United States ===
Cadd arrived in Los Angeles in 1975 and began working on a record with Chelsea Records. The label was forced into bankruptcy and ultimately ceased. Cadd then signed with Capitol Records and released his fourth studio album, White On White, in 1976. The album was mixed and produced to have a "pop sound" along the lines of Elton John and Billy Joel, but performed poorly in the US. In 1978, Cadd released Yesterdaydreams which also performed poorly and his contract with Capitol Records ceased. The track "Yesterdaydreams" was covered by Bonnie Tyler.

=== 1980–1993: The Flying Burrito Brothers and Graffiti Records ===
Early in 1980, Cadd toured France with the "French Elvis", Johnny Hallyday. He recorded solo albums for Interfusion, his songs were also recorded by Gene Pitney, Glen Campbell, Dobie Gray, Cilla Black, Wayne Newton, Bonnie Tyler, Joe Cocker and Ringo Starr. His biggest success occurred when The Pointer Sisters covered "Love is Like a Rolling Stone" as a B-side for their version of "Fire" which reached No. 2 on the US pop singles charts. In the mid-1980s, Cadd ran a small label called Graffiti Records and worked with Daryl Somers and was the first person to sign Tina Arena.

He released a 1985 album titled No Stone Unturned. The Charlie Daniels Band covered his song "Still Hurting Me" from that album on their October 1985 album, Me and the Boys.

Cadd travelled to Nashville in 1989, joined The Flying Burrito Brothers in 1991 and toured with them for two years, returning to Australia in 1993.

=== 1993–2015: Return to Australia, The Blazing Salads, ARIA Hall of Fame and autobiography ===
In 1993, Cadd teamed up with fellow Axiom member, Shorrock and released an album under the title The Blazing Salads and completed a two-year tour. The Blazing Salads peaked at number 130 in May 1993, while lead single "When It All Comes Down" peaked at number 135.

In 1997, Cadd built a recording studio Ginger Man Sound. In March 1998 he took over as CEO of The Streetwise Music Group in Brisbane, eventually becoming a co-owner. The company, which is distributed through Warner Music, now has some 20 acts spread over three labels (Streetwise, Stallion and Belly Laugh).

Cadd is the chairman of the Music Industry Advisory Council (Australia), President of the Australian Music Foundation and on the board of the musicians' benevolent organisation, Support Act. Cadd lectures at universities as well as continuing to record and perform, he independently released an album of new material Quietly Rusting in 2005 featuring musicians like Mark Meyer, Tony Naylor, Wilbur Wilde and Ross Hannaford together with some of Australia's hottest new players including Paul White, Damien Steele-Scott and James Meston.

In 2007, Cadd was inducted into the ARIA Hall of Fame, his acceptance speech included:

"I've had forty incredible years in this world of music. During that time I have had the honour to write and record with many fabulous creative people and to perform in front of many wonderful audiences. I can't really imagine how it could have been much better or any more fun. Now being inducted into the ARIA Hall of Fame absolutely puts the icing on the cake for me. I truly appreciate this honour so very much".

— Brian Cadd, 2007

Also in 2007, Cadd was inducted into the Australian Songwriters Association (ASA) Songwriters Hall of Fame in recognition of his lifetime of songwriting achievements.

In November 2010, Cadd released his autobiography, From This Side of Things. In the book Cadd tells the stories of his upbringing in Western Australia where he won a TV talent quest at the age of 12 and worked on a children's TV program as a pianist, about his time in Tasmania and Melbourne where he played jazz with The Beale Street Jazz Band and The Castaways who would become The Jackson Kings. Having success with both the Groop and Axiom as well as his solo success in Australia, working in the United States and Europe for over 20 years and being inducted into the ARIA Hall of Fame in 2007 by Jimmy Barnes.

In 2011, Cadd released a country album, Wild Bulls and Horses, with his longtime friend Russell Morris.

=== 2016–present: Bulletproof and Silver City ===
In November 2016, Cadd released a new studio album with the Bootleg Family Band, Bulletproof, which was credited to Cadd and The Bootleg Family Band. Cadd issued a solo studio album, Silver City (January 2019). He followed in April 2024, with a country music album, Dream Train.

== Personal life ==
Cadd, his then partner, and her daughter, were caught in the flash flood of the Mudgeeraba River (Gold Coast, Queensland) in February 1999, when their car was washed off a causeway. All three escaped the sinking car through its windows, but Cadd and his wife were swept away before they could get ashore. They were subsequently rescued by a local resident.

During the 2002 Long Way to the Top Tour, Cadd developed a relationship with one of the promoters, Amanda Pelman. Pelman was a judge on It Takes Two between 2006 and 2008, and is a producer, director and TV personality.

In April 2025, Cadd was hospitalised after a stroke, which left him unable to sing.

== Discography ==
=== Albums ===
- Brian Cadd (1972)
- Parabrahm (1973)
- Moonshine (1974)
- The Magic of Brian Cadd (1975)
- White on White (1976)
- Yesterdaydreams – (1978)
- No Stone Unturned (1985)
- Cleanskin (2003)
- Quietly Rusting (2005)
- Wild Bulls and Horses (with Russell Morris) (2011)
- The Story of Sharky and the Caddman (with Glenn Shorrock) (2013)
- Bulletproof (with The Bootleg Family Band) (2016)
- Silver City (2019)
- Dream Train (2024)

=== See also ===
- The Groop
- Axiom (Australian band)
- The Bootleg Family Band
- The Flying Burrito Brothers

== Awards and nominations ==
=== ARIA Music Awards ===
The ARIA Music Awards is an annual awards ceremony that recognises excellence, innovation, and achievement across all genres of Australian music. They commenced in 1987.

Year	Nominee / work	Award	Result	Ref.
2007	Himself	ARIA Hall of Fame	Inducted	
2014	The Story of Sharky and The Caddman (with Glenn Shorrock)	Best Original Soundtrack, Cast or Show Album	Nominated	

=== Australian Radio Records Awards ===
Cadd won Best Male Vocal Album three years in a row between 1972 and 1974.

Year	Nominee / work	Award	Result
1972	Brian Cadd	Best Male Vocal Album	Won
1973	Parabrahm	Best Male Vocal Album	Won
1974	Moonshine	Best Male Vocal Album	Won

=== Australian Songwriter's Hall of Fame ===
The Australian Songwriters Hall of Fame was established in 2004 to honour the lifetime achievements of some of Australia's greatest songwriters.

Year	Nominee / work	Award	Result
2007	Himself	Australian Songwriter's Hall of Fame	Inducted

=== Go-Set Pop Poll ===
The Go-Set Pop Poll was coordinated by teen-oriented pop music newspaper, Go-Set and was established in February 1966 and conducted an annual poll during 1966 to 1972 of its readers to determine the most popular personalities.

Year	Nominee / work	Award	Result
1972	Himself	Songwriter	1st

=== King and Queen of Pop Awards ===
The King and Queen of Pop Awards were voted by the readers of TV Week. The King of Pop award started in 1967 and ran through to 1978.

Year	Nominee / work	Award	Result
1973	Himself	Best Songwriter	Won
1973	Himself	Most Popular Australian Musician	Won
1973	Himself	Contribution to Australian Pop Industry	Won
1974	Himself	Most Popular Australian Musician	Won
1974	Himself	Contribution to Australian Pop Industry	Won

=== Mo Awards ===
The Australian Entertainment Mo Awards (commonly known informally as the Mo Awards), were annual Australian entertainment industry awards. They recognise achievements in live entertainment in Australia from 1975 to 2016. Brian Cadd won one award in that time.

Year	Nominee / work	Award	Result (wins only)
2009	Brian Cadd	Rock Performer of the Year	Won
