= The Groop =

Australian folk, R&B and rock band

The Groop (Australian band)
- Also known as: The Wesley Three
- Origin: Melbourne, Victoria, Australia
- Genres: Folk, rock, R&B
- Years active: 1964–1969, 1989
- Label: CBS
- Past members: Peter Bruce; Peter McKeddie; Max Ross; Richard Wright; Don Mudie; Brian Cadd; Ronnie Charles

The Groop were an Australian folk, rock and R&B band formed in 1964 in Melbourne, Victoria and had their greatest chart success with their second line-up of Max Ross on bass, Richard Wright on drums and vocals, Don Mudie on lead guitar, Brian Cadd on keyboards and vocals, and Ronnie Charles on vocals. The Wesley Trio formed early in 1964 with Ross, Wright and Peter McKeddie on vocals; they were renamed The Groop at the end of the year.

The Groop's best known hit single "Woman You're Breaking Me" was released in 1967; the band won a trip to United Kingdom but had little success there. Cadd later admitted that their style of music would have suited the US rather than the UK. Other singles included "Ol' Hound Dog", "Best in Africa", "I'm Satisfied", "Sorry", "Seems More Important to Me" and "Such a Lovely Way".

When The Groop disbanded in 1969, Cadd and Mudie formed Axiom with Glenn Shorrock (later in Little River Band). Cadd was inducted into the Australian Recording Industry Association (ARIA) Hall of Fame in 2007, for his work with The Groop, Axiom and as a solo artist.

== History ==
=== 1964–1966: The Groop mark I ===
The Wesley Trio was formed as a folk music group in 1964 with Peter McKeddie on vocals, Max Ross on bass guitar and Richard Wright on drums; all three were students from Wesley College, a private school in Melbourne. The trio signed with CBS Records Melbourne, which released a single, an EP and an album.

They decided to become more R&B orientated and placed an ad for a guitarist, and, with Peter Bruce joining, they were renamed The Groop in late 1964. At the time, Bruce (originally from England) claimed that he had been a member of UK pop group Dave Clark Five in their early years as Dave Clark Quintet in 1957. In a 2002 interview, Bruce admitted that he had only been in a support act, The Hill City Skiffle Group and never actually in Dave Clark's band. The Groop had success on the Melbourne singles chart with "Ol' Hound Dog" reaching No. 13, "Best in Africa" No. 10 and "I'm Satisfied" No. 21 in 1966. They were assisted by positive reviews from Ian "Molly" Meldrum writer for national pop magazine Go-Set who had earlier been their roadie. This version of The Groop also recorded two albums, The Groop (1965) and I'm Satisfied (1966) both on CBS Records. In August 1966, founders McKeddie and Bruce left, but instead of disbanding the Rhythm section of Ross and Wright invited Don Mudie (ex–Sherwood Green) to join on guitars. At McKeddie's farewell party – he was travelling to UK – The Groop were supported by another R&B outfit The Jackson Kings. The Groop invited their keyboardist Brian Cadd to join, Cadd insisted on bringing along bandmate Ronnie Charles (Ron Boromeo) as vocalist.

=== 1966–1969: The Groop mark II ===
The Groop were searching for a more Blues / Rock sound, and when Cadd joined in October 1966 he used a pseudonym, Brian Caine, after advice from Meldrum that Cadd didn't sound good as a rock artist's name. Cadd soon changed his name back after family protests. The new line-up of Cadd, Charles, Mudie, Ross and Wright, released "Sorry" which reached No. 12 on the Melbourne charts in January 1967. Their next single, released in May 1967, "Woman You're Breaking Me" (written by Cadd and Wright) reached No. 4 in Melbourne, No. 12 in Sydney, and was their only national top ten hit.

The band won a trip to UK from the 1967 Hoadley's National Battle of the Sounds in July, with "When I Was Six Years Old" written by Cadd and Ross. Meldrum, writing for Go-Set reported:

"It was The Groop's day. Their performance was brilliant and they left no doubts in anyone's mind that they will be great ambassadors overseas, both with their music and their personalities."

— Ian "Molly" Meldrum, July 1967

Publishers sent the song to England where it was recorded by Manfred Mann's lead vocalist Paul Jones. Melbourne singer Ronnie Burns (close friend of Meldrum) had a local No. 22 hit with "When I Was Six Years Old" in 1968. Leaving the single "Seems More Important to Me" behind in Melbourne to reach No. 30 in early 1968, The Groop travelled to UK on the Sitmar line cruiser "Castel Felice". They gave several onboard performances during the voyage.

The Groop arrived in the UK as Paul Jones' cover of "When I Was Six Years Old" was released and they secured a deal with CBS in England, then toured there and in Germany. Band members had written most of their hits in Australia, but CBS decided they would cover an Italian ballad, "What's The Good of Goodbye", which failed to chart. The Groop returned to Australia by October 1968 and Ross left the band. They released two more singles, but only "Such A Lovely Way" reached the national top 20 before they disbanded in May 1969. Their last recorded work was an uncredited appearance as instrumental support on Russell Morris' No. 1 single "The Real Thing". Cadd and Mudie were eager to explore a more rock sound and so disbanded The Groop to form Axiom. The second version of The Groop had recorded the studio album Woman You're Breaking Me (1967), whilst the compilation Great Hits from The Groop (1968) was released while they were in UK.

=== After The Groop ===
Following the break-up of The Groop, Cadd and Mudie formed Axiom in May 1969 with Glenn Shorrock (ex-The Twilights) on vocals, Doug Lavery (ex-The Valentines) on drums and Chris Stockley (ex-Cam-Pact) on guitar. Cadd and Mudie were the primary songwriters for Axiom including their three hit singles, "Arkansas Grass", "A Little Ray of Sunshine" and "My Baby's Gone". After Axiom disbanded in 1971, Cadd and Mudie had a No. 15 single in early 1972 with "Show Me the Way". Cadd then pursued a solo career as a performer, songwriter, record producer, label owner and film and TV score composer. In 2007 Cadd was inducted into the ARIA Hall of Fame, which acknowledged his iconic status including his work for The Groop.

=== 1988–1989: Brief reformation ===
The Groop reformed for a national tour from late 1988 to early 1989, with members from both versions: Bruce, Charles, McKeddie, Mudie and Wright; plus Rob Glover on bass (ex-Sports) and Tweed Harris on keyboards (ex-Groove). A CD compilation was released by CBS in 1989, The Best and The Rest.

== Discography ==
=== Albums ===
- The Groop – CBS (1965)
- I'm Satisfied – CBS (1966)
- Woman You're Breaking Me – CBS (1967)
- Great Hits from the Groop - Music for Pleasure (1977)
- Best of the Rest - CBS (1989)

=== Extended plays ===
- Woman You're Breaking Me (CBS) (1966)
- Such a Lovely Way (CBS) (1968)
- Raven RV07 (1974)

=== Singles ===
Year	Single	Chart Positions	Label
Year	Single	AU	Label
1965	"Mojo"	-	W&G
1965	"Ol' Hound Dog"	30	CBS
1966	"The Best in Africa"	32	CBS
1966	"I'm Satisfied"	53	CBS
1966	"Empty Words"	99	CBS
1967	"Sorry" / "Who Do You Love"	34	CBS
1967	"Woman You're Breaking Me" / "Mad Over You"	6	CBS
1967	"Annabelle Lee" / "Seems More Important To Me"	40	CBS
1968	"Lovin' Tree" / "Nite Life"	65	CBS
1969	"Such a Lovely Way" / "We Can Talk"	13	CBS
1969	"You Gotta Live Love" / "Sally's Mine"	92	CBS

== Awards and nominations ==
=== Go-Set Pop Poll ===
The Go-Set Pop Poll was coordinated by teen-oriented pop music newspaper, Go-Set and was established in February 1966 and conducted an annual poll during 1966 to 1972 of its readers to determine the most popular personalities.

Year	Nominee / work	Award	Result
1967	themselves	Top Australian Group	3rd
