= '79-'85 =

'79–'85

Greatest hits album by Mi-Sex
- Released: October 1985
- Label: CBS Records

Mi-Sex chronology
Where Do They Go? (1983)	'79–'85 (1985)	The Essential Mi-Sex (2007)

'79–'85 is the first greatest hits album by New Zealand new wave band Mi-Sex, released in October 1985. The album included tracks from the band's four studio albums and some previously released non-album singles. A limited released of 5000 copies included a bonus 12" medley.

'79–'85 peaked at number 46 on the Australian Kent Music Report.

== Track listing ==
Vinyl / Cassette (CBS – SBP 8117)

side A
No.	Title	Writer(s)	Album	Length
1.	"Graffiti Crimes"	Kevin Stanton	Graffiti Crimes	4:16
2.	"But You Don't Care"	Stanton; Murray Burns	Graffiti Crimes	4:33
3.	"Castaway" (US version)	Burns; Steve Gilpin; Paul Dunningham	non-album single	3:27
4.	"Down the Line (Making Love On the Telephone)"	Stanton; Burns	non-album single	3:55
5.	"Falling In and Out"	Stanton; Burns	Shanghaied!	3:19
6.	"People"	Stanton; Burns; Giplin	Space Race	3:50

side B
No.	Title	Writer(s)	Album	Length
1.	"Computer Games"	Stanton; Burns; Giplin	Graffiti Crimes	4:00
2.	"It Only Hurts When I'm Laughing"	Stanton; Burns; Giplin	Space Race	4:00
3.	"Space Race"	Stanton; Burns	Space Race	3:42
4.	"Only Thinking"	Burns; Colin Bayley; Stanton; Dunningham	Where Do They Go?	4:03
5.	"Lost Time"	Stanton; Burns; Giplin; Dunningham; Ted Yanni	non-album single	3:34
6.	"Blue Day"	Burns; Bayley	Where Do They Go?	4:14

Limited Edition Bonus 12"

side 1
No.	Title	Length
1.	"Non-Stop Sex" (medley of "Castaway", "But You Don't Care", "It Only Hurts When I'm Laughing", "Space Race", "Computer Games", "Falling In and Out", "Blue Day", "People")	9:50

side B
No.	Title	Length
1.	"Son of Non Stop Sex" (medley of "Falling In and Out", "Castaway", "But You Don't Care", "Space Race", "Computer Games")	5:37
2.	"Shanghaied!"	3:24

== Charts ==
Chart (1985)	Peak position
Australian Kent Music Report	46
