= Space race (disambiguation) =

The Space Race was a competition between the United States and the Soviet Union to explore outer space.

Space race, Space Racer, and their derivations may also refer to:

== Competitions and rivalries ==
- Billionaire space race, the intense rivalry between billionaire entrants into NewSpace
- Mars race, the competitive environment between various national space agencies, "New Space" and aerospace manufacturers involving crewed missions to Mars, land on Mars, or set a crewed base there
- Space competition, an offer of a prize for the first competitor who demonstrates a space vehicle

== Arts, entertainment, and media ==
=== Games ===
- Space Race (video game), a 1973 arcade game by Atari
- Space Race, a minigame featured in the Space Jam video game
- Looney Tunes: Space Race, a 2000 video game featuring the Looney Tunes
- The Great Space Race, a 1984 computer game by Legend Software
- Surviving Mars: Space Race, 2018 DLC for Surviving Mars

=== Music ===
- Space Race (album), a 1980 album by New Zealand rock band Mi-Sex
- "Space Race" (Mi-Sex song), the titular song by Mi-Sex on their eponymous 1980 album
- "Space Race" (Billy Preston song) (instrumental), a song by Billy Preston
- "Space Race", a 1984 song by The Sugarhill Gang from Livin' in the Fast Lane

=== Television ===
==== Series ====
- Space Race (TV series), a BBC docu-drama series first shown on BBC2
- Space Racers, a 2014 animated children's TV show
- Yogi's Space Race, a 1978 animated series by Hanna-Barbera Productions

==== Episodes ====
- "Space Race" (Archer), the two-part third season finale of Archer
- "Space Race" (Stargate SG-1), an episode of the show Stargate SG-1
- "Space Race" (Steven Universe), a 2014 first season episode of Steven Universe
- "The Space Race", a 2016 eighth season episode of Regular Show

== See also ==
- List of space races
- Race (disambiguation)
- Space (disambiguation)
- The Race for Space (disambiguation)
