= Extended Play (Mi-Sex EP) =

EP by Mi-Sex
- Released: 19 February 2016
- Recorded: 2015
- Genre: Electro-rock
- Label: Golden Robot Records

Mi-Sex chronology
The Essential Mi-Sex (2007)	Extended Play (2016)	Not from Here (2016)

Singles from Extended Play
- 1. "Somebody " Released: 2 February 2016

Extended Play is the debut extended play (EP) by New Zealand new wave band Mi-Sex. The EP includes "Somebody", the band's first new single in 25 years as well as three re-recorded hits. The EP was released on 19 February 2016 to coincide with the first show in the Clash of the Titans Tour which Mi-Sex co-headlined with Dragon and Angels.

Murray Burns Discussed re-recording the band's earlier hits with the 13th Floor, "We just went and played them like we do live on stage and had a little play around with them afterwards. Yeah, it was pretty interesting 23 or 24 years on."

== Background and release ==
Mi-Sex formed in 1977 and released four studio albums between 1979-1983 before splitting in 1986. The band’s original singer Steve Gilpin died from a car crash in 1992. The continuing band members of Don Martin, Murray Burns, Paul Dunningham and Colin Bayley reformed on stage to fundraise for the 2011 Christchurch Earthquake, before resuming on an ongoing basis with singer Steve Balbi and guitarist Travis New.

The group signed with Sydney rock label Golden Robot Records and released "Somebody" on 2 February 2016.

== Track listing ==
No.	Title	Writer(s)	Length
1.	"Somebody"	Colin Bayley, Murray Burns, Steve Balbi	3:49
2.	"Computer Games"	Kevin Stanton, Burns, Steve Giplin	4:15
3.	"People"	Stanton, Burns, Giplin	3:53
4.	"Falling In and Out"	Stanton, Burns	3:36

== Tour ==
=== Clash of the Titans Tour ===
- Auckland Town Hall - 19 February 2016
- Hamilton, Claudelands Arena - 20 February 2016
- Havelock North, Blackburn Vineyards - 21 February 2016
- Wellington, Shed 6–23 February 2016
- Christchurch, The Bedford Big Top - 26 February 2016
- Dunedin Town Hall - 27 February 2016
- Invercargill, Civic Theatre - 28 February 2016

=== Extended Play Tour ===
- The Bridge Hotel, Drummoyne - 1 April 2016
- Memo Music Hall, St Kilda - 2 April 2016

== Release history ==
Region	Date	Format(s)	Label	Catalogue
Australia/New Zealand	19 February 2016	Digital download, Compact Disc	Golden Robot Records	GOLDRR002
