= Just Zoot =

Studio album by Zoot
- Released: July 1970
- Recorded: 1969–1970
- Genre: Pop rock
- Label: Columbia
- Producer: Howard Gable; Ian Meldrum on "Monty and Me"

Zoot chronology
Just Zoot (1970)	Zoot Out (1971)

Just Zoot is the debut and only studio album by Australian rock/pop band Zoot. The album was released in July 1970 and peaked at number 12 on the Kent Music Report.

The title is a correction to the reference of people often calling the band "The Zoot".

== Track listing ==
LP/Cassette

Side A
No.	Title	Writer(s)	Length
1.	"One Times, Two Times, Three Times Four"	Terry Britten
2.	"Hey Mr. Songwriter"	Rick Springfield
3.	"Flying"	Springfield
4.	"Yes I'm Glad"	Britten
5.	"Who's Afraid of You"	Springfield
6.	"About Time"	Brian Cadd; Don Mudie

Side B
No.	Title	Writer(s)	Length
1.	"Monty and Me"	Bruce Woodley; Hans Poulsen
2.	"Sailing"	Britten
3.	"Feelings"	Cadd; Mudie
4.	"Sha La La"	Springfield
5.	"She's Alright"	Britten
6.	"Shake Your Feathers"	Springfield

== Personnel ==
Zoot

- Darryl Cotton - vocals
- Rick Springfield - guitar
- Beeb Birtles - bass
- Rick Brewer - drums

== Charts ==
Chart (1970)	Peak position
Australian Kent Music Report Albums Chart	12

== Release history ==
Region	Date	Format	Edition(s)	Label	Catalogue
Australia	July 1970	LP	Standard	Columbia Records	SCXO7916
Australia	12 April 2019	LP	Limited Edition Baby Pink	EMI Music	7728576
