= Don't Fall in Love =

Single by The Ferrets

from the album Dreams of a Love
- B-side: "Lies"
- Released: June 1977
- Recorded: 1977
- Label: Mushroom
- Songwriters: Kenneth Firth, Ian Davis
- Producers: Willie Everfinish; the Ferrets

The Ferrets singles chronology
| "Robin Hood" (1977) | "Don't Fall in Love" (1977) | "Janie May" (1977) |

"Don't Fall in Love" is a song by Australian pop band The Ferrets. Released in June 1977 as the lead single from their debut studio album Dreams of a Love, the song peaked a number 2 on the Australian Kent Music Report.

The song was recorded in three to eight hours with the intention of being the B-side for "Lies" but producer Ian Molly Meldrum (under the pseudo Willie Everfinish) realised "it was too good to be B-side".

== Recording ==
Engineer Tony Cohen said, "There's no snare because [drummer] Rick Brewer forgot to bring it. Everyone dropped a trip. It was midnight by the time we arrived at Rick's, so we threw one down his throat and were back at AAV within the hour. By nine o'clock that morning, "Don't Fall in Love" was done. We played it to Molly. He said, 'Yeah, that great.'"

== Track listing ==
Australian 7-inch (K-6825)

1. "Don't Fall in Love"
2. Lies"

== Charts ==
=== Weekly charts ===
| Chart (1977) | Peak position |
|---|---|
| Australia (Kent Music Report) | 2 |

=== Year-end charts ===
| Chart (1977) | Position |
|---|---|
| Australia (Kent Music Report) | 16 |
