= The Incredible Penguins =

- Origin: Melbourne, Australia
- Genre: pop
- Years active: 1985
- Label: Mushroom

The Incredible Penguins were an Australian supergroup formed in 1985, which reached the top ten on the Australian Kent Music Report Singles Chart with their cover of "Happy Xmas (War Is Over)" in December. Contributors included Colin Hay (Men at Work), Angry Anderson (Rose Tattoo), Bob Geldof, Brian Mannix (Uncanny X-Men), Scott Carne (Kids in the Kitchen), Colleen Hewett, and John Farnham. The charity project, for research on little penguins, was organized and produced by Countdown host, Ian “Molly” Meldrum.

== History ==
After hosting Oz for Africa—the Australian leg of Live Aid—in mid-1985, Ian Meldrum decided to create a charity project for a local issue. Meldrum was talent coordinator and compere of national pop music show, Countdown. Late in 1985, he used his industry contacts to organise a charity single for research on fairy penguins. He produced the recording of a cover of John Lennon, Yoko Ono and Plastic Ono Band's 1971 hit, "Happy Xmas (War Is Over)".

The Incredible Penguins were a briefly existing covers band, with members: Steve Donald (Wendy & the Rocketts) on percussion, Craig Johnston (ex-Mother Goose) on vocals, Wayne Matthews (ex-The Masters Apprentices) on bass guitar, John Moon (ex-Keays, W.H.Y.) on guitar, Pat Polo on guitar, and Marcel Rodeka (ex-Mother Goose) on drums.

In late October 1985, The Incredible Penguins entered the Flagstaff Studios in Melbourne with Meldrum and guest musicians: Angry Anderson (Rose Tattoo), Brian Canham (Pseudo Echo), Scott Carne (Kids in the Kitchen), John Farnham, Venetta Fields, Bob Geldof, Steve Gilpin (ex-Mi-Sex), Hare Krishna Chorus, Colin Hay (Men at Work), Colleen Hewett, Jim Keays (ex-The Masters Apprentices), Brian Mannix (Uncanny X-Men), Wendy Stapleton (Wendy & the Rocketts) and Chris Stockley (ex-Axiom, The Dingoes).

A three-track single, "Happy Xmas (War Is Over)" was released by Mushroom Records and peaked at #10 on the Australian Kent Music Report Singles Chart in December.

== Discography ==
- "Happy Xmas (War Is Over)" (December 1985, Mushroom Records X13232) AUS: #10 (Dec 1985)
  - "Happy Xmas (War Is Over) Extended Version" (John Lennon, Yoko Ono) – 5:42
  - "Happy Xmas (War Is Over) Radio Mix" (Lennon, Ono) – 3:44
  - "Happy Xmas (War Is Over) Penguin Instrumental Mix" (Lennon, Ono) – 5:11
