= Dreams of Love =

Dreams of Love or Dream of Love may refer to:

== Film and television ==
- Dream of Love, a 1928 American biopic about Maurice de Saxe
- Dreams of Love (1935 German film), an Austrian-German film
- Dreams of Love (1935 Mexican film), a Mexican biopic about Franz Liszt
- Dream Love (film), a 1935 Hungarian film
- Dreams of Love (1947 film), a French biopic about Franz Liszt
- Dreams of Love – Liszt, a 1970 Hungarian-Soviet biopic about Franz Liszt
- Pyar Ka Sapna (lit. 'Dream of Love'), a 1968 Indian Hindi-language film
- "Dream of Love" (Adventure Time), a television episode

== Music ==
- Liebesträume (Dreams of Love), a set of three solo piano works by Franz Liszt

== See also ==
- Dreams of a Love, a 1977 album by The Ferrets
