= Only Thinking =

- Australian / New Zealand art work

Single by Mi-Sex

from the album Where Do They Go?
- B-side: "The Name Game"
- Released: October 1983
- Studio: Rhinoceros Studio, Sydney, Australia
- Genre: Pop, electronic, new wave
- Label: CBS
- Songwriter(s): Murray Burns, Kevin Stanton, Steve Gilpin, Colin Bayley, Paul Dunningham
- Producer(s): Bob Clearmountain

Mi-Sex singles chronology
"Lost Time" (1982)	"Only Thinking" (1983)	"Blue Day" (1984)

"Only Thinking" is a song by New Zealand group Mi-Sex, released in October 1983 as the lead single from their fourth studio album, Where Do They Go? (1983). The song peaked at number 48 in Australia.

== Track listings ==
Australia/New Zealand 7" (BA 223106)

1. "Only Thinking"
2. "The Name Game"

North America 7" (Epic AS 1852)

1. "Only Thinking" - 4:01
2. "Where Do They Go?" - 4:18

== Charts ==
Chart (1983–1984)	Peak position
Australian Kent Music Report	48
