= Where Do They Go? =

Studio album by Mi-Sex
- Released: November 1983
- Recorded: 1983
- Studio: Rhinoceros Studio, Sydney Australia
- Genre: Pop music, Synthpop
- Label: CBS
- Producer: Bob Clearmountain, John Sayers, Mi-Sex

Mi-Sex chronology
Shanghaied! (1981)	Where Do They Go? (1983)	'79-'85 (1985)

Singles from Where Do They Go?
- 1. "Only Thinking" Released: October 1983; 2. "Blue Day" Released: February 1984; 3. "5 O'Clock (In the Morning)" Released: May 1984

Where Do They Go? is the fourth studio album by New Zealand new wave band Mi-Sex, released in November 1983. The album peaked at number 80 on the Australian Kent Music Report. It would be the band's last studio album until Not from Here in 2016.

Professional ratings
Review scores
Source	Rating
AllMusic	3/5 stars

== Track listing ==
Vinyl/cassette (237954) Side one
No.	Title	Writer(s)	Length
1.	"Only Thinking"	Kevin Stanton, Murray Burns, Colin Bayley, Paul Dunningham	4:01
2.	"Where Do They Go"	Stanton, Burns, Dunningham, Steve Gilpin	4:18
3.	"Antipodes Army"	Stanton, Burns, Dunningham	3:25
4.	"Blue Day"	Bayley, Burns	4:17
5.	"I Lose Control"	Stanton	4:07

Side two
No.	Title	Writer(s)	Length
1.	"Don't Look Back in Anger"	Bayley, Burns	3:16
2.	"5 O'Clock (In the Morning)"	Stanton, Bayley, Burns	3:09
3.	"Why Did You Leave"	Stanton, Burns, Giplin
4.	"The Stanger in You"	Stanton, Burns	4:14
5.	"Delinquent Daddy"	Stanton, Burns
6.	"Lady Janice"	Stanton

== Charts ==
Chart (1983/84)	Peak position
Australian Kent Music Report	80
