= Molly Meldrum =

Australian music journalist and media personality (1943–2026)

Molly Meldrum AM
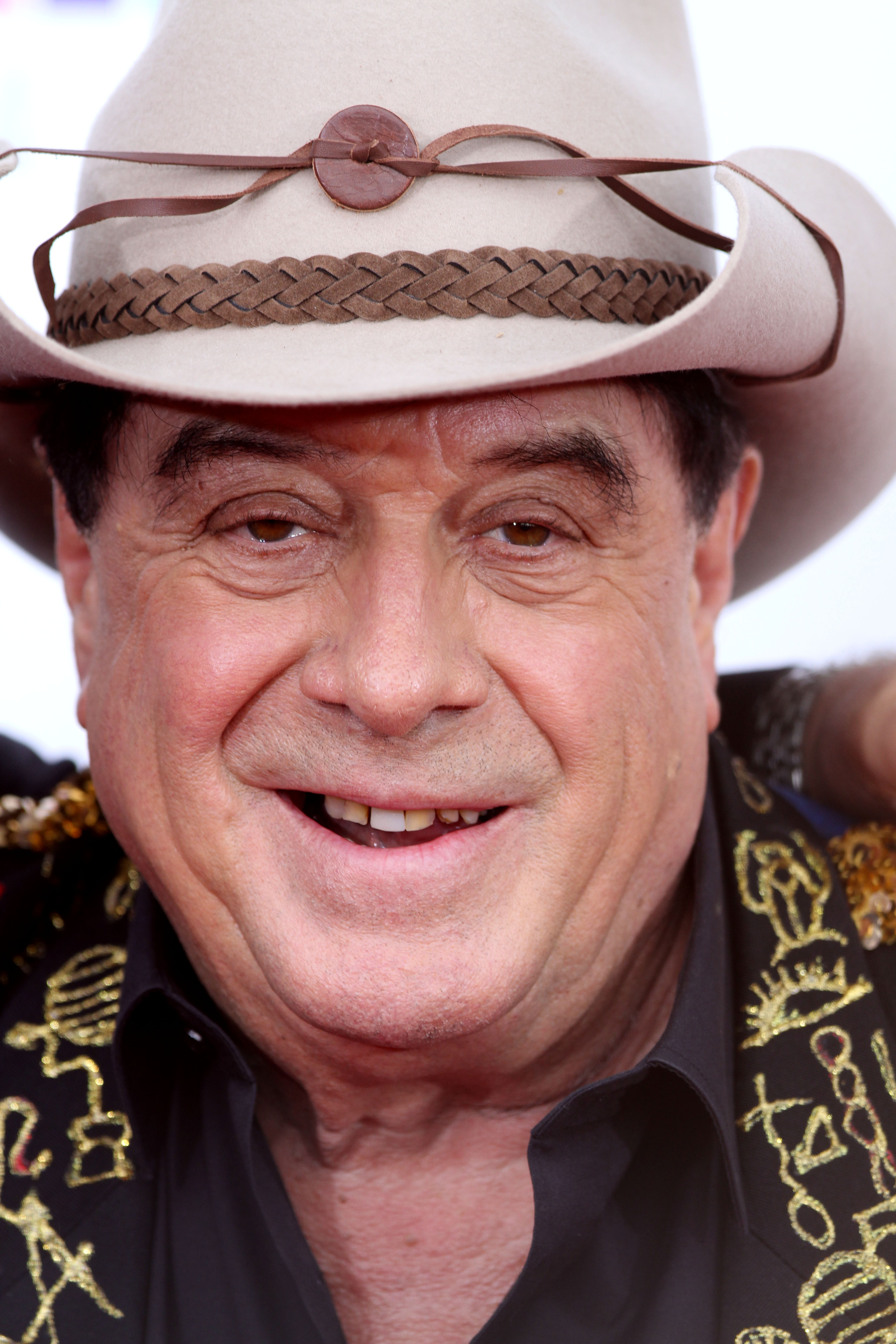
- Meldrum in 2014
- Born: Ian Alexander Meldrum; 29 January 1943; Victoria, Australia
- Died: 23 November 2026 (aged 83); Richmond, Melbourne, Victoria, Australia
- Occupations: Music critic; journalist; record producer; musical entrepreneur; television personality; author
- Years active: 1966–2026
- Known for: Countdown; Hey Hey It's Saturday

Ian Alexander "Molly" Meldrum (29 January 1943 – 23 November 2026) was an Australian music critic, journalist, record producer and musical entrepreneur. He was the talent coordinator, on-air interviewer, and music news presenter on the former popular music program Countdown (1974–87) and was widely recognised for his trademark Stetson hat, which he had regularly worn in public since the 1980s (it is commonly mistaken for an Akubra).

Meldrum featured on the Australian music scene from the mid-1960s, first with his writing for Go-Set (1966–74), a weekly teen newspaper, then during his tenure with Countdown and subsequent media contributions. As a record producer he worked on top ten hits for Russell Morris ("The Real Thing", "Part Three into Paper Walls", both 1969), Ronnie Burns ("Smiley", 1970), Colleen Hewett ("Day by Day", 1971), Supernaut ("I Like It Both Ways", 1976) and the Ferrets ("Don't Fall in Love", 1977).

Meldrum hosted Oz for Africa in July 1985, the Australian leg of Live Aid. In January of the following year he was appointed a Member of the Order of Australia, with the citation for "service to the fostering of international relief and to youth". Meldrum earned a reputation as a champion of Australian popular music both in Australia and internationally; his contributions have been acknowledged with an Australian Recording Industry Association (ARIA) Award for Special Achievement in 1993, and the "Ted Albert Award" in 1994 at the Australasian Performing Right Association (APRA) Awards. Music journalists, Toby Creswell and Samantha Chenoweth describe him as "the single most important person in the Australian pop industry for forty years" in their 2006 book, 1001 Australians You Should Know. In 2014, Meldrum was inducted into the ARIA Hall of Fame, together with his TV show Countdown; he became the first non-artist to receive the accolade. Earlier that year he published his autobiography, The Never, Um... Ever Ending Story: Life, Countdown and Everything in Between.

On 15 December 2011, Meldrum had a life-threatening fall from a ladder in the backyard of his Melbourne home. He was placed under intensive care in a critical condition at the Alfred Hospital and had surgery for his head and spinal injuries. By April 2012 he had recovered enough to give interviews and resume work duties.

== Early life ==
Ian Alexander Meldrum was born in rural eastern Victoria on 29 January 1943. (Note: For name as Ian Alexander Meldrum, date of birth, place of birth and parents' names, see "Births". For name as Ian Molly Meldrum and birth date, see Cashmere. For name as Ian "Molly" Meldrum, for Orbost as place of birth, see Eliezer. (Note: this source incorrectly cites year of birth as 1946 and places Orbost in Victoria's Mallee).) His father was Robert Meldrum (7 April 1907 – 29 September 1978), a farmer from Caniambo near Shepparton) and then a World War II army sergeant—who served with the AIF. in Port Moresby—and his mother was Isobel Elizabeth (née Geer, 1912–1969) from Orbost. The couple married on 17 August 1940, two months after Robert's enlistment. Meldrum's younger brothers are Brian (born 1946, Mildura) and Robert (born 1950, Kerang).

Meldrum moved around during childhood and grew up largely with one of his grandmothers in Quambatook, where he attended the local primary school alongside future country music artist John Williamson. He also stayed with a number of aunts and was raised in the traditions of the Church of England. He developed a musical interest in Gilbert & Sullivan and Verdi. Meldrum's father later ran a hardware store in Kyabram. His mother had periodic hospitalisations for mental illness including some years at Larundel Mental Asylum, Bundoora in the mid-1960s. In the early 1960s Meldrum arrived in Melbourne where he briefly attended Taylors College. Initially intending to become a disc jockey he studied at a radio school. He would go to University of Melbourne without formally enrolling, carrying law books, to eat lunch with the law students: "I hung around, I wouldn't even say I got into a course."

Soon after, he had moved in with the family of his close friend, Ronnie Burns, who became a pop star: first as a member of The Flies (1964–65) and then as a solo artist. Meldrum had followed Burns to the latter's home and asked, "Is there any chance I could come and live with you and your family?" What had started as a two-week stay with the Burns family became nine years. During The Beatles' tour of Australia in June 1964, Meldrum was captured by TV cameras climbing atop the bonnet of their car shortly after arrival at Melbourne airport. Later, he and Burns were ejected from The Beatles' Melbourne concert for being "too enthusiastic".

While on a surfing holiday at a Victorian coastal resort in Lorne in 1964, Meldrum befriended Lynne Randell, who became a pop star in the mid-1960s and later worked as Meldrum's personal assistant in the 1980s. Also in 1964, Meldrum began his music career as a roadie for his friends' band, The Groop, which had early performances in Anglesea.

== Go-Set years: 1966–1974 ==
Go-Set was a weekly pop music newspaper started in February 1966 by Phillip Frazer, Tony Schauble, and their Monash University friends. Meldrum started writing for the paper in July that year after befriending its editor, Frazer. Frazer said "As I recall it, Ian was sweeping the floor... I said to [Schauble], 'Who's this guy? Where'd he come from?' and Tony said, 'I dunno, he just came in and wanted to do something.'" Meldrum's first story was on Burns, "Ronnie Meets the Barrett Brothers". His first printed interview was with Johnny Young, a singer-songwriter from Perth. Soon Meldrum was writing a weekly gossip column and regular feature stories. He continued until the paper folded in August 1974. By social networking and building a list of industry contacts, Meldrum was able to cover many facets of the local scene; his gossip columns informed not only general readers but also other musicians and, according to Frazer, they were the major reason people continued reading Go-Set.

Meldrum's writing style was "freeform ramblings, always in the first person, and nearly always concerning aspects of the music scene with which he had been involved." It was during this period that Meldrum was given his nickname, Molly, by his friend and fellow Go-Set writer Stan Rofe, a Melbourne radio DJ. Rofe's writing style was more analytical; he "praised or criticised an aspect of the music industry, and press[ed] Australian musicians to perform better. [He] was also critical of Meldrum's performance as a 'journalist', often questioning his integrity and music values." The nickname, Molly, first appeared in print in 1968 in Rofe's column. While working for Go-Set, Meldrum became editor and compiler of its monthly offshoot, Gas, which was aimed at younger teen girls. It was first published in October 1968 (with a feature on The Monkees) and its last issue was in March 1971.

The Groop had landed a recording deal with CBS Records. Meldrum followed them to Melbourne's Armstrong Studios, in late 1966, to observe the recording process. He learned record producer and engineering techniques from studio owner, Bill Armstrong, and in house engineer-producer, Roger Savage. Meldrum became involved with a number of artists' releases, including The Masters Apprentices' August 1967 single, "Living in a Child's Dream". Their lead singer, Jim Keays, recalled that Meldrum "had quite an influence on the eventual outcome" as the unlisted assistant engineer. He produced Somebody's Image's first three singles, "Heat Wave" (September), "Hush" (November) and "Hide and Seek" (April 1968). Their best performed single, "Hush", which peaked at No. 14 on the Go-Set National Top 40, was a cover version of Billy Joe Royal's track from earlier in 1967. Besides producing, he was also Somebody's Image's manager from early 1967 and formed a friendship with lead singer, Russell Morris.

Kommotion was a teen-oriented daily TV pop music show, which had premiered in December 1964 on ATV-0, later Channel Ten. It included local performers miming to the latest overseas hits and artists showcasing their own material. In August 1966 its then-producer, David Joseph, was fired and most of the cast walked out in support. Al Maricic replaced Joseph and Meldrum reported the change-over for Go-Set. Maricic asked Meldrum to join the show: originally he declined but was convinced otherwise by Frazer, who reasoned that it would be good for their circulation. Episodes of Kommotion were directed by Rob Weekes.

Meldrum's repertoire included miming to Peter and Gordon's "Lady Godiva", The New Vaudeville Band's "Winchester Cathedral" and George Formby's "Why Don't Women Like Me?". Fellow mimers included Grant Rule, Denise Drysdale and Maggie Stewart—who later married Burns. Meldrum's stint with Kommotion ended in January 1967 after Actors Equity banned the practice of miming other artists' work. He moved on to another ATV-0 music show, Uptight, hosted by Ross D. Wyllie, which was broadcast for four hours on Saturday mornings with live bands and acts miming their own material.

From January 1968, Meldrum relocated to London, reporting in Go-Set on The Groop's efforts to break into the United Kingdom market; he also wrote about the English rock music scene. While there, Meldrum extended his networking to international contacts, including meeting Apple Records executive, Terry Doran, who introduced him to his idols, Paul McCartney and John Lennon. His writing style in Go-Set developed a camp form. Meldrum returned to Australia to attend his mother's funeral in May.

In September, he became the manager and producer of Russell Morris after both had quit Somebody's Image. Meldrum produced Morris' first solo single, a Johnny Young-composed song, "The Real Thing". Young had written the song for Meldrum's friend Burns, but when Meldrum heard Young playing it backstage during a taping of the TV pop show Uptight, he determined to secure it for Morris, reportedly going to Young's home that night with a tape recorder and refusing to leave until Young had taped a demo version. In collaboration with Armstrong's house engineer John Sayers, Meldrum radically transformed "The Real Thing" from Young's original vision of a simple acoustic chamber ballad backed by strings, into a heavily produced studio masterpiece, extending it to an unheard-of six minutes in length (with encouragement from Rofe) and overdubbing the basic track with many additional instruments, vocals and sound effects. To achieve this, they used the services of his friends from The Groop as the backing band, with contributions from vocalist Maureen Elkner, The Groop's lead singer Ronnie Charles, guitarist Roger Hicks from Zoot, who played the song's distinctive acoustic guitar intro, and arranger John Farrar.

The single reputedly cost A$10,000—the most expensive ever made in Australia up to that time—and features one of the earliest uses of phasing on an Australian recording. "The Real Thing", which was released in March 1969, became a national number-one hit for Morris in mid-year. It is widely acknowledged as one of the finest Australian pop-rock recordings. In May 2001, the Australasian Performing Right Association (APRA), as part of its 75th Anniversary celebrations, named "The Real Thing" as one of their Top 30 Australian songs of all time. Morris followed with a second number-one hit, "Part Three into Paper Walls", with Meldrum producing again. He now encouraged Morris to promote "The Real Thing" with a tour in the United States but Morris disagreed and they separated in late 1969.

Meldrum also produced several other hits, including Burns' top ten single, "Smiley", in December 1969, while continuing to write for Go-Set and a variety of magazines. Meldrum made his first of many visits to Egypt and by December had travelled on to UK. Through Terry Doran he began working for Apple Corps as a publicist, which enabled him to score a scoop interview with Lennon and Yoko Ono, in which Lennon first revealed publicly that The Beatles were breaking up. Meldrum left the UK in 1970 to travel to the USA, reporting on the Los Angeles and New York music scenes and further establishing his contacts.

After returning to Australia in late 1970, Meldrum continued writing for the music press, including Go-Set as well as venturing back onto TV as a music reporter on Happening '70 (previously titled, Uptight), hosted by Wyllie, on ATV-0; then a short-lived TV children's show, Do It; followed by Anything Can Happen on Channel Seven where he met producer, Michael Shrimpton and reunited with Weekes from his Kommotion days. In October and November 1971, Elton John toured Australia for the first time and all concerts were exclusively reviewed by Go-Set—Meldrum had briefly met John in London and they formed an enduring friendship by the end of that tour. By September 1972 Meldrum was assistant editor for Go-Set working with its national editor, Ed Nimmervoll, who had started at the paper in 1967:

Meldrum [was] a socialite whose weekly column was a diary of his social life. Musicians reading the 'Meldrum' column would know whom he had seen, and what their status as a musician was.

— Ed Nimmervoll, 1998, quoted in Kent, David Martin (September 2002), p. 141.

In 1972, Meldrum produced the soundtrack for Godspell – Original Australian Cast (see Godspell for original Broadway 1971 version) including the hit single, "Day by Day" for Colleen Hewett. He remained with Go-Set until its last issue on 24 August 1974. Most of his work was typed up by his then-secretary, Glenys Long, with Meldrum pacing the office as he dictated—sometimes typewriters were thrown or a person was shoved inside a filing cabinet. After Go-Set, Meldrum wrote columns for Listener-In TV and then TV Week as their rock music reporter.

== Countdown years: 1974–1987 ==
In 1974, Shrimpton and Weekes were meeting at the Botanical Hotel in South Yarra, formulating the concept for a new weekly TV pop music show aimed at the teenage market and decided they needed a talent scout; Meldrum walked in (to go to the bottle shop for a Scotch whisky) and was given the job. The trio approached the Australian Broadcasting Corporation (ABC), with their idea based on the British show Top of the Pops and on Kommotion. Countdown premiered on 8 November, with Meldrum as the show's talent coordinator. He did not originally appear in the series, which had a different guest host each week.

Shrimpton decided an editorial was needed, so Meldrum provided a weekly Rock Report from mid-1975 which was renamed "Humdrum" by guest host John Paul Young, and by year's end he had become the face of the series. "Humdrum" saw Meldrum provide a visual form to his Go-Set gossip column, he would interview celebrities, detail events and new releases for the week. Joining Shrimpton and Weekes as a producer was Rule, also from Kommotion. Australian musicologist Ian McFarlane described Meldrum's "Humdrum" as "a riot of non-sequiturs and unjustified hyperbole. In between all the 'ums' and 'ahs', occasionally Molly managed to tell the viewers about a good album he had just heard".

Countdown was originally broadcast weekly, at 6:30 pm on Friday evenings for 25 minutes. Contributing to its success was the move in January 1975 to a 6 pm Sunday time-slot and its extension to 60 minutes. Its reach was improved by a mid-afternoon Saturday time-slot to repeat the previous week's show. Countdown soon became the most successful and popular TV music program ever made in Australia, and it exerted a dramatic influence on the local music scene over the next decade. The advent of colour TV in March 1975 coincided with a major shift in the direction of local popular music, and was vital in the national success for artists such as Skyhooks and Sherbet. Countdown benefited from the emergence of the music video genre: it popularised promotional videos, which had previously been a minor part of pop shows. Its use of film-clips, by both established and developing overseas acts (which rarely toured Australia), made Countdown an important venue for breaking new songs and new artists.

Meldrum produced the debut self-titled album for Supernaut in May 1976 and its related hit single, "I Like It Both Ways". He also promoted The Ferrets; he had them signed to Mushroom Records and started producing their debut album, Dreams of a Love, on 19 July 1976. After nearly a year, production was incomplete, so The Ferrets took over (assisted by audio engineers Tony Cohen and Ian MacKenzie) and finalised it on 15 August 1977. Meldrum was attributed as Willie Everfinish (a play on "will he ever finish") For its lead single, he wanted the A-side as "Lies", taking weeks to produce it, and his preferred B-side, "Don't Fall in Love", was rushed in three hours. When The Ferrets premiered on Countdown, they used "Don't Fall in Love" instead, which reached No. 2 on the Australian Kent Music Report Singles Chart. Many customers wanted a copy of The Ferrets' album; however, there was concern at Mushroom, as Meldrum had not yet organised the cover. A white, hand-stamped cardboard sleeve was issued with a promise of the artwork to follow.

Countdown gave early exposure to, and generated breakthrough Australian hits for, many international artists, including ABBA, Meat Loaf, Blondie, Boz Scaggs, Cyndi Lauper, Madonna, and Michael Jackson; sometimes this occurred years before they became international stars. Meldrum made overseas trips and formed friendships with many artists, enabling Countdown to gain international exclusives. His on-screen performances were sometimes criticised for rambling and incomprehensible commentaries or interview questions. When providing an album review he would often hold the album awkwardly in front of the cameras with lights glaring off its surface making it difficult to see. In an early "Humdrum" segment, Meldrum told viewers to "Go out and buy it" when reviewing an album. Shrimpton was furious, since ABC policy prohibited direct endorsements, so "do yourself a favour" became Meldrum's standard recommendation. Other catchphrases that he added to the vernacular are "So watch out for that one", "So there you go!" and "A good mate of mine".

In October 1977, Rod Stewart started his Foot Loose & Fancy Free Tour through the US. In New York the press corps were waiting for comments, Stewart was granting very few interviews—he recognised Meldrum and called him over for a "ten-minute grab [which] turned into an hour and a bit." After Meldrum had run out he was "being fed questions to ask Rod by the rest of the world's music press." In July 1978 Michelle Morris of The Canberra Times described Meldrum as "sometimes outrageous, accident-prone and stumbling ... [who] has become an authority in the industry and often a promotional clip has only to be played on Countdown for a record to take off in the charts."

Lynne Randell, a friend of Meldrum's since her teenage years, and a local singing star of the 1960s, had returned to Australia from the UK in 1980 after her marriage had failed, and she became Meldrum's personal assistant until 1986. On 13 April 1980, the TV Week-Countdown Rock Music Awards for 1979 were broadcast as a revamped version of the previously existing TV Week King of Pop Awards with the 'King of Pop' title replaced by 'Most Popular Male' and 'Queen of Pop' replaced by 'Most Popular Female'. Countdown, with Meldrum organising the ceremonies, presented music awards during 1980 to 1987. Initially they were held in conjunction with TV Week, they were a combination of popular-voted and peer-voted awards.

In August 1980, Gregg Flynn of The Australian Women's Weekly was on set during the taping of an episode which featured INXS, Doc Neeson (The Angels), Daryl Braithwaite (ex-Sherbet) and Toy Love. Flynn felt that Meldrum "appeared decidedly more healthy than some of his guest bands who looked as if anorexia nervosa was one of the side effects of guitar strumming." His appointment to the show had had "TV critics whipping themselves into a lather of hysterical accusations that the coiffured host was at best a cruel joke and at worst a danger ... [with his] mangled monologues as being detrimental to young people's vocabulary."

The following year, on 16 March 1981, Meldrum co-hosted the 1980 awards ceremony with international guests Suzi Quatro and Jermaine Jackson. Big winners were Cold Chisel with seven awards, which were not collected; the group performed the last live number, "My Turn to Cry", to close the show and then trashed their instruments and the set. The performance was seen as being directed at TV Week, Countdown, and Meldrum as being hangers-on. McFarlane felt the set trashing was a "protest against the show's vacuous nature". Sponsors TV Week withdrew their support for the awards and Countdown held its own ceremonies thereafter.

In February 1985, after Meldrum was announced as King of Moomba, he quipped: "I was at the cricket the other day and the boys in Bay 13 at the Melbourne Cricket Ground were all yelling out 'Moomba' and 'hail the king'... not to mention a few 'hail the queen'". On 13 July Meldrum compèred the 1985 Oz for Africa concert—the Australian leg of the global Live Aid program running for four hours—which was broadcast in Australia on both the Seven Network and Nine Network and on MTV in the US. During December he used his industry contacts to organise a charity single for research on fairy penguins, he produced the recording of a cover of Lennon, Ono & Plastic Ono Band's "Happy Xmas (War Is Over)" by The Incredible Penguins with Angry Anderson (Rose Tattoo), Brian Canham (Pseudo Echo), Scott Carne (Kids in the Kitchen), John Farnham, Venetta Fields, Bob Geldof, Steve Gilpin (ex-Mi-Sex), Colin Hay (Men at Work), Hewett, Keays (ex-The Masters Apprentices), Brian Mannix (Uncanny X-Men), Wendy Stapleton (Wendy & the Rocketts) and Chris Stockley (ex-Axiom, The Dingoes).

In 1986, Shrimpton, Rule and Meldrum created another series, The Meldrum Tapes, for ABC with an international or local artist interviewed in depth for 55 minutes—eventually, 24 shows were made—which were later broadcast by MTV. Meldrum was noted for several on-screen gaffes, although the most "famous" of all was not originally broadcast. In a much-retold incident, a clearly anxious Meldrum gushed during an interview on 13 November 1977, with Prince Charles, "I saw your mum in London in a carriage!" to which the Prince replied, "Are you referring to Her Majesty the Queen?" Although this incident is often related by Meldrum in interviews, it was not broadcast until later, as an out-take.

Despite some episodes of ineptitude, Meldrum became a major star in his own right and was a champion of local talent and regularly used the show to pressure radio stations to play more Australian music. McFarlane noted that alongside his bumbling, "Molly was a music fanatic, totally committed to, and passionate about, his work. Ultimately it was his drive that helped make Countdown so popular". As a result of his efforts, the show was able to make overnight hits of songs and performers it featured, and through the late 1970s and early 1980s it was a key factor in determining the direction of Australian popular music. By the mid-1980s its influence was waning, in part due to numerous other music video shows on commercial TV.

The final episode of Countdown aired on 19 July 1987, followed by the 1986 Countdown Awards. Meldrum appeared at the end of the show wearing his cowboy hat. He saluted the music industry and fans, then bared his shaved head in imitation of Midnight Oil's Peter Garrett and expressed regret that they had never appeared on the show. Dave Warner, musician and writer, described Meldrum's impact "[he] was loved, loathed, reviled, respected, but above all, watched... You simply couldn't ignore [him] nor could the Australian music industry."

In November 1998, Brian Mannix (ex-Uncanny X-Men) wrote and directed a stage play, Countdown: The Musical Comedy, with Meldrum portrayed by Michael Veitch. McFarlane observed "[it] was a loving and funny tribute to the Countdown era. It may have been shameless nostalgia, but with Veitch perfectly cast as Molly it was a hell of a lot of fun". It toured Australia through 1998 to 1999 and, in 2009, was revamped as Can't Believe It's not Countdown – It's a Musical Comedy. Meldrum also appeared on the tribute show, Countdown: Do Yourself a Favour, celebrating its 40th anniversary, which was broadcast by ABC in November 2014.

== After Countdown ==
In 1986, Meldrum and Amanda Pelman, Mushroom Records executive, had formed the Body Beat label and, two years later, Melodian Records, both under the Mushroom umbrella. Body Beat issued electronic and disco music locally for various international artists, including Joyce Sims, Hanson & Davis, Joy Peters, and Mozzart (aka Paul Lander). Melodian signed Indecent Obsession (1988–93), which issued their debut single, "Say Goodbye" in May 1989—it peaked at No. 6 on the ARIA Singles Chart. Other Melodian artists were Roxus (1989–91), Jo Beth Taylor (1990–93) and Peter Andre (1990–97). Andre had been a contestant on New Faces in July 1990 when Meldrum was judging the TV talent show; Meldrum told TV Week that "Peter impressed us all and he has a unique voice that can be developed". Andre's highest-charting single with Melodian was "Gimme Little Sign" (December 1992)—a cover version of Brenton Wood's 1967 original—which peaked at No. 3 in April of the following year.

From 1988, Meldrum presented a regular music segment, "Molly's Melodrama", on the TV variety show Hey Hey It's Saturday—it was the successor to his earlier "Humdrum" editorials on Countdown. He travelled extensively, conducting interviews for his segment; including a set of one-on-one interviews with each member of The Rolling Stones.

Meldrum made a cameo appearance in Neighbours that year.

In March at the ARIA Music Awards of 1988 Meldrum was a presenter. A fracas developed between band manager, Gary Morris, accepting awards for Midnight Oil, and Meldrum. Morris felt that foreign artists such as Bryan Ferry should not present awards to local artists and made fun of Ferry's deliberately crumpled suit. Meldrum objected to Morris' disrespect to Ferry and he and Morris became embroiled. At the 1991 ceremony Morris provided a 20-minute acceptance speech on behalf of Midnight Oil: Meldrum disapproved of its length in the media. However, in 1993, when Meldrum received his ARIA Special Achievement Award for services to the music industry he provided one of the longest acceptance speeches in the ceremony's history.

A televised roast, in 2003, for the openly gay Meldrum, Molly: Toasted and Roasted, was characterised by the recipient as a "gay bashing" due to its excessive homophobic slurs. Footy Show star Sam Newman received boos from the audience during his speech. Meldrum became a judge on 2004's Popstars Live, a reality talent quest program on Channel Seven, alongside fellow judges, Christine Anu and John Paul Young.

Meldrum's trademark cowboy hat headwear, enthusiasm for popular music, and sometimes incoherent interviewing style remain well known. By visiting Egypt over 30 times since 1969, he became an amateur Egyptologist and collector. That his extensive general knowledge extended beyond popular music was less well known until, as a contestant on a celebrity edition Who Wants to Be a Millionaire?, he won $500,000 for a charity, which was the equal-biggest win on the Australian version of the program until October 2005), by using his phone a friend to ring Red Symons of Skyhooks fame (who also performed well on the show when he was in the hot seat, also reaching the $500,000 mark but failing the question). Meldrum appeared on the fourth season of the Australian version of Dancing with the Stars in 2006, where he dressed as a pharaoh to dance to "Walk Like an Egyptian" by The Bangles; he was voted off after the first round. He was also on an episode of Deal or No Deal (Dancing with the Deals) on 13 February 2006.

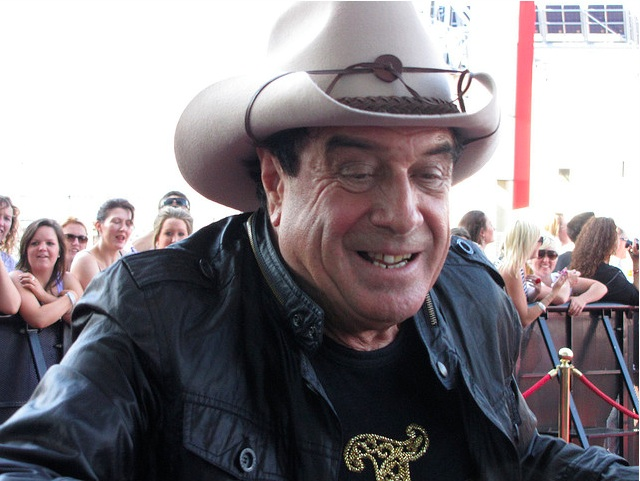
Meldrum at Acer Arena, ARIA Awards, 2009

In September 2006, Meldrum's interview with Prince Charles on Countdown was listed at No. 41 in TV Week's "Top 50 most memorable moments on Australian television" list. He made cameo appearances in Remembering Nigel (2007) and Ricky! The Movie (2010). Meldrum is listed as co-author of Jeff Jenkins' 2007 book, Molly Meldrum Presents 50 Years of Rock in Australia, where he provided comments on various Australian rock acts from 1958 to 2007. During September and October 2009, Meldrum appeared in Hey Hey It's Saturday reunion specials on the Nine Network despite working for the rival Seven Network.

In early December 2009, Meldrum interviewed UK singer and series 3 Britain's Got Talent runner-up, Susan Boyle. After signing with Seven to continue on Sunrise, Weekend Sunrise and Sunday Night, he was unavailable for the 2010 season of Hey Hey It's Saturday. In February 2010, Meldrum was appointed King of Moomba—his second appointment—with Kate Ceberano as Queen of Moomba. Since 2010 Meldrum was a regular guest on Steve Vizard's daily radio show, commenting on sport, music, travel and current affairs.

In late November 2011, at the ARIA Awards, Meldrum introduced Prime Minister of Australia, Julia Gillard, who inducted pop singer Kylie Minogue into the ARIA Hall of Fame. After the induction, Meldrum interviewed Minogue for MTV Australia.

On 15 April 2012, at the annual Logie Awards, Meldrum was inducted into the Logie Hall of Fame. In a recorded segment, Elton John described him as having done more for the Australian music industry than anyone else. On 26 November 2014, Meldrum was inducted into the ARIA Hall of Fame, together with Countdown, by Marcia Hines and John Paul Young—Meldrum became the first non-artist to receive the accolade. He also became the second person to be inducted in both the Logie and ARIA Halls of Fame.

On 7 February 2016, the first part of a television biopic miniseries called Molly aired on Australian television, with Meldrum played by Samuel Johnson. It featured flashbacks of Meldrum's life and some actual footage of videos seen on Countdown. Unaired footage from his interview with Prince Charles showed Johnson as Meldrum but actual footage of Prince Charles as himself. Part two of the miniseries aired on 14 February 2016, with its final scene a moving salute to Meldrum as he returns to public life after a lengthy hospital stay. Actual footage of Meldrum himself receiving a standing ovation as he walks out with the aid of a walking stick ends the series. Johnson would win both an AACTA Award and a Logie Award for his portrayal of Meldrum; however, Meldrum's hijacking of Johnson's speech at the 2017 Logie Awards would lead to a rift between the two.

In November 2018, Meldrum was inducted into the Music Victoria Hall of Fame.

== Personal life ==
Meldrum had an adult adopted son who lives overseas with his wife, Crystal Scholes, and the couple's son, Meldrum's grandson. Although Meldrum was one of the first openly gay TV stars in Australia, he said, "I had girlfriends. I was engaged a few times." He subsequently asserted that he is bisexual, although he used the term "gay" interchangeably.

On 6 September 1976, his home in South Yarra was broken into; the thieves "stole sound equipment valued at $14,000". Shortly before 8 pm on 11 October 1984, while Meldrum was in London to tape interviews with David Bowie, Boy George and Billy Idol, a fire broke out in a hallway closet at his Richmond residence. The fire spread to the sitting-room, kitchen and bedroom, with the 'Egyptian room' suffering moderate water and smoke damage. Meldrum's manager, Ray Evans, said that his personal record collection and an autographed photo of the Beatles were lucky to have survived the fire.

Since 1986, he lived in the Melbourne suburb of Richmond in an Egyptian-themed house called "Luxor". According to The Age's Nick Miller, the Nine Network's 2003 celebrity roast, Molly: Toasted and Roasted, was unnecessarily focused on his sexuality. Meldrum was sorry when his family and friends were embarrassed by the poor taste of some comments. However, he replied, "Like a lot of people, I am proud to be gay ... I'm not upset. If Channel Nine want to do gay bashing, so be it." As of December 2011, Meldrum's partner of six years was Yan Wongngam who runs a courier business in Thailand.

Meldrum was a prominent supporter of the St Kilda Football Club in the Australian Football League (AFL) and the Melbourne Storm in the National Rugby League (NRL). Storm players continued their 2009 NRL Grand Final victory celebrations at his house in October that year. In 2000, Meldrum co-wrote an autobiography, Some of My Best Friends Aren't: The Molly Meldrum Story, with journalist Jeff Jenkins, which was published by Random House Australia. However, The Age reported on 4 June 2007 that the book had still not appeared. In 2014 he published an autobiography, The Never, Um... Ever Ending Story: Life, Countdown and Everything in Between, co-written with Jeff Jenkins. This was followed by a second book in 2016 titled Ah Well, Nobody's Perfect: The Untold Stories also co-written by Jenkins.

=== 2011 accident ===
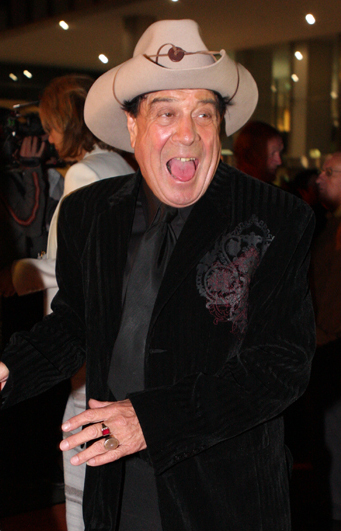
Meldrum just after his accident, looking rather excited

On 15 December 2011, Meldrum was taken to the Alfred Hospital in a critical condition after being found unconscious in the backyard of his home in Richmond. He had fallen off a ladder from a height of around three metres. He was placed under intensive care in a sedated state and had surgery for his head injuries. As well as the head injuries, Meldrum had a broken shoulder, broken ribs, a punctured lung and cracked vertebrae. Meldrum had been with Steve Vizard on radio discussing the importance of health on the morning of the accident. By 27 December, further surgery to his chest injuries had occurred and his sedation levels were reduced. His brother Brian said that Meldrum had "spoken some words but they have no context".

On 8 January 2012, Brian said Meldrum was breathing on his own and having conversations, but added that his recovery would be slow. On 19 January, Meldrum was taken out of hospital and moved into a rehabilitation centre. In April he gave his first public interview since the accident.

On 13 January 2023, a visibly intoxicated Meldrum climbed onstage from the audience at an Elton John concert in Australia and attempted to briefly involve himself in the performance. After sharing a quick embrace with John and kissing him on the lips, Meldrum stood by the piano as John performed and attempted to involve himself in an impromptu duet with the singer. After a few seconds of loitering by the piano, Meldrum dropped his pants and presented his buttocks to the audience. Shortly afterwards Meldrum was escorted offstage by security guards. The incident received significant media attention, resulted in the sacking of the security guards who allowed Meldrum onstage, and reignited conversations surrounding the state of Meldrum's mental health. Meldrum later apologised for the incident, blaming his public exposure on an ostensibly faulty belt buckle while conceding that he was "a naughty boy, who needs a new belt".

Samuel Johnson, in an emotionally charged interview on The Morning Show, when asked to comment on the incident, expressed strong disappointment, frustration and concern with repeated patterns in Meldrum's behaviour. Johnson asserted that Meldrum "shouldn't be allowed out in the PM [as] he's sozzled by that time" due to "[having] two shots of vodka in his coffee in the morning" and passionately implored Meldrum to "stop". Johnson questioned the whereabouts and effectiveness of Meldrum's "minders" and advised Meldrum that it may be time for him to "hang up [his] hat".

On 19 January 2023, new video footage emerged showing that Meldrum had previously lowered his trousers to moon an audience while onstage at the ChillOut Festival in Daylesford, Victoria, in March 2022. On 21 March 2023, it was reported that further new footage had emerged showing that Meldrum had once again exposed himself in public to urinate on the floor of Rod Laver Arena while attending a Rod Stewart concert on 15 March 2023. Meldrum remained seated while relieving himself.

Meldrum died in a Melbourne hospital on the morning of 23 November 2026.

== Recognition and awards ==
On Australia Day (26 January) 1986, Meldrum was made a Member of the Order of Australia, with a citation for "service to the fostering of international relief and to youth". At the ARIA Music Awards of 1993, he received a Special Achievement Award to acknowledge his contributions to popular music. In 1994 at the Australasian Performing Right Association (APRA) Awards he received the Ted Albert Award (named in honour of Ted Albert).

Music journalists Toby Creswell and Samantha Chenoweth describe Meldrum as "The single most important person in the Australian pop industry for forty years" in their 2006 book, 1001 Australians You Should Know.

In November 2014, he was inducted into the ARIA Hall of Fame, together with his TV show Countdown; he became the first non-artist to receive the accolade. At the Music Victoria Awards of 2018, Meldrum was inducted into the Music Victoria Hall of Fame.

=== Film ===
In 2016, a documentary film entitled Molly: The Real Thing, premiered on Seven Network television. The film documents Meldrum's life and career, featuring interviews and personal stories from many famous friends and music industry figures, including Kylie Minogue, Hugh Jackman, and Delta Goodrem.

=== Accolades ===
| Year | Award | Category | Recipient | Result |
|---|---|---|---|---|
| 1985 | Moomba Festival | King of Moomba | Ian "Molly" Meldrum | awarded |
| 1986 | Queen's Birthday Honours | Member of the Order of Australia | Ian "Molly" Meldrum | awarded |
| 1993 | ARIA Music Awards | Special Achievement Award | Ian "Molly" Meldrum | awarded |
| 1994 | APRA Awards (Australia) | Ted Albert Award for Outstanding Services to Australian Music | Ian "Molly" Meldrum | awarded |
| 2010 | Moomba Festival | King of Moomba (2) | Ian "Molly" Meldrum | awarded |
| 2012 | Logie Awards | Logie Hall of Fame | Ian "Molly" Meldrum | inducted |
| 2014 | ARIA Music Awards | ARIA Hall of Fame | Ian "Molly" Meldrum & Countdown | inducted |
| 2018 | Music Victoria Awards | Music Victoria Hall of Fame | Ian "Molly" Meldrum | inducted |

== Bibliography ==
- Meldrum, Ian (1981). Molly Meldrum's Rock Blast. Sydney, NSW: Summit Books. ISBN 978-0-7271-0522-6.
- Meldrum, Ian; Jenkins, Jeff (2000). Some of My Best Friends Aren't: The Molly Meldrum Story. Random House. ISBN 978-0-09-183997-0. Note: As of 4 June 2007, the existence of this book is disputed.
- Meldrum, Ian; Jenkins, Jeff (2006). Classic hits music trivia challenge (Book + DVD). North Melbourne, Vic: Force Entertainment. ISBN 978-1-921203-01-5.
- Jenkins, Jeff; Meldrum, Ian (2007). Molly Meldrum presents 50 years of rock in Australia. Melbourne, Vic: Wilkinson Publishing. ISBN 978-1-921332-11-1.
- Meldrum, Ian; Jenkins, Jeff (2014). The never, um, ever ending story: life, countdown and everything in between. Farnham, John (preface); Gudinski, Michael (introduction); Masterson, Lawrie (afterword). Crows Nest NSW Allen & Unwin. ISBN 978-1-76011-205-9.

== Discography ==
Meldrum's production work:

- The Masters Apprentices ("Living in a Child's Dream", 1967) (audio engineer)
- Somebody's Image ("Heat Wave", September 1967; "Hush", November; "Hide and Seek", April 1968)
- Russell Morris ("The Real Thing", "Part Three into Paper Walls", both 1969)
- Ronnie Burns ("Smiley", 1970)
- Colleen Hewett ("Day by Day", 1972)
- Various Artists (Godspell – Original Australian Cast, 1972)
- Supernaut ("I Like It Both Ways", 1976)
- The Ferrets ("Don't Fall in Love", Dreams of a Love, 1977) Meldrum is listed as Willie Everfinish.
- Cheetah ("Walking in the Rain", 1978)
- The Incredible Penguins and various artists ("Happy Xmas (War Is Over)", 1985)

== See also ==
- Molly: Do Yourself a Favour (2015)
