= Spaniards (band) =

- Origin: Melbourne, Victoria, Australia
- Genres: Pop music
- Years active: 1983-1986
- Label: EMI
- Past members: (Australian musician)Billy Miller (Vocals & Guitar), Mick Pealing (Vocals), Russell Brown (Bass & Vocals), Mark Mannock (Keyboards),John Annas (Drums), Kevin Purcell (Keyboards), Chris Ziros (Guitar & Vocals), Anthony Ziros (Drums), Christopher Smith (bass & vocals), Wayne Young (Drums).

Spaniards were a short-lived Australian musical group, which formed in 1983. Their 1986 debut mini-album, Locked in a Dance peaked at number 55 on the Australian charts. It was produced by Mark Opitz. Members included Russell Hellyer-Brown on bass guitar, Mark Mannock on keyboards, Billy Miller on guitars and vocals (ex-The Ferrets), and Mick Pealing on vocals (ex-Stars, Ideals).

== Discography ==
=== Studio albums ===
Title	Album details	Peak chart positions
Title	Album details	AUS
Locked in a Dance	Released: March 1986; Format: LP, Cassette; Label: EMI Music (EMM-430038)	55

=== Singles ===
List of singles, with Australian chart positions
Year	Title	Peak chart positions	Album
Year	Title	AUS	Album
1984	"God Is a Shield"	54	Locked in a Dance
1985	"Angel"	59	Locked in a Dance
1986	"What Can I Do"	99	Locked in a Dance

Second Lineup 1986 - 1989 Mick Pealing Vocals, Russell Brown Bass Vocals, Chris Ziros Guitar Vocals, Antony Ziros Drums, Mark Mannock Keyboards,
