= Shanghaied! =

Studio album by Mi-Sex
- Released: October 1981
- Studio: Studios 301, Music Farms Studios, Sydney
- Genre: New wave, synth-pop
- Length: 35:01
- Label: CBS
- Producer: John L Sayers and Misex

Mi-Sex chronology
Space Race (1980)	Shanghaied! (1981)	Where Do They Go? (1983)

Singles from Shanghaied!
- 1. "Falling In and Out" Released: April 1981; 2. "Missing Person" Released: September 1981; 3. "Shanghaied!" Released: November 1981

Shanghaied! is the third studio album by New Zealand new wave band Mi-Sex, released in October 1981. The album peaked at number 28 on the Australian Kent Music Report.

== Reception ==
Professional ratings
Review scores
Source	Rating
AllMusic	2.5/5 stars

Ian McFarlane described the album as "arguably the band's best album... [which] failed to impress the record-buying public."

== Track listing ==
Vinyl/cassette (237701) Side one
No.	Title	Writer(s)	Length
1.	"The Jungle"	Kevin Stanton, Murray Burns	3:23
2.	"Be Quiet"	Stanton, Burns, Steve Gilpin	3:37
3.	"Mystery"	Stanton	2:13
4.	"Water"	Stanton, Don Martin	3:20
5.	"Talking to Myself"	Stanton	3:39

Side two
No.	Title	Writer(s)	Length
1.	"Missing Person"	Richard Hodgkinson	2:44
2.	"Tears in Her Wine"	Stanton, Burns	3:19
3.	"Caught in the Act"	Hodgkinson	2:47
4.	"Shanghaied!"	Stanton, Burns	3:24
5.	"Falling In and Out"	Stanton, Burns	3:19
6.	"Young Maniacs"	Stanton	3:15

== Charts ==
Chart (1981–1982)	Peak position
Australian Kent Music Report	28
