= The Ferrets (band) =

Australian pop band

- Origin: Australia
- Genre: Pop
- Years active: 1975–1979
- Labels: Mushroom, Charisma
- Past members: see Members list below

The Ferrets were an Australian pop band. They are best known for their song "Don't Fall in Love" and album, Dreams of a Love which were both released in 1977.

== History ==
=== 1975: Formation ===
Ken Firth, Phil Eizenberg and William "Billy" Miller had been involved with the Australian stage production of Jesus Christ Superstar (1972–1974) which also included singer-actors Jon English, John Paul Young and Rory O'Donoghue.

Firth (bass guitar, backing vocals), Miller (vocals, guitar) and Dave Springfield (guitar, backing vocals) were all members of hard rockers Buster Brown (which also featured vocalist Angry Anderson later of Rose Tattoo). In November 1975 the trio left Buster Brown to join guitarist Eizenberg and formed The Ferrets. Drummer Rick Brewer (ex-Zoot) joined in April 1976 followed by Miller's sisters Jane Miller (backing vocals, keyboard) and Pam Miller (backing vocals) in July—they were now a seven-piece band.

=== 1976-1977: "Don't Fall in Love" and Dreams of a Love ===
After favourable reactions from audiences in Melbourne and Sydney, The Ferrets produced a demo tape that caught the attention of Ian "Molly" Meldrum talent coordinator for Australian Broadcasting Corporation (ABC) TV series Countdown. Meldrum got them signed to Mushroom Records and started producing their debut album, Dreams of a Love, in July 1976.

In April 1977 they released their debut single, "Robin Hood", which did not chart. After nearly a year, production of the album was still incomplete, so The Ferrets took over—assisted by recording engineers Tony Cohen and Ian MacKenzie—Meldrum was attributed as "Willie Everfinish".

In June 1977, The Ferrets released the single "Don't Fall in Love". It was recorded in three hours. The Ferrets premiered on Countdown in an episode compered by Jon English performing "Don't Fall in Love", which peaked at No. 2 Nationally. They were awarded with 'Best Australian TV Performer' at the 1977 King of Pop Awards for their Countdown appearances.

In October 1977, The Ferrets released "Janie May" which reached No. 25 nationally and was televised on Countdown on 13 November 1977, an episode which also featured an interview between Meldrum and Prince Charles which would go on to become infamous. Their debut album Dreams of a Love was released in October 1977 and achieved Gold record status. The album cover depicted a model (Wendy Bannister) holding a snarling ferret on her shoulder.

=== 1978-1979: Fame at Any Price and disbandment ===
By the end of 1977, guitarist Eizenberg and backing vocalist Pam Miller had left. After another single, "Are You Looking at Me?" was released in April 1978. Jane Miller also left. The Ferrets continued to tour and recorded their second studio album Fame at Any Price which was produced by Cohen and released in October 1978. There were disappointing sales for the related singles "This Night" (written by Frank Howson, Firth, Miller) and "Tripsville" and for the album itself. Firth also left to be replaced successively by George Cross (previously in Jim Keays Southern Cross with Brewer) and Ric Petropolis. The Ferrets had no further chart success and disbanded in March 1979.

=== Subsequent careers ===
- Philip Eizenberg: Played bass guitar in Mighty Guys (1980s) with Mick Hamilton and Leon Isackson. He studied martial arts from 1984 (at age 34) and was registered with the Australian Hapkido Association as a 4th Degree instructor. He played bass on Night of the Gale with Phill Raymond in 2006.
- Kenneth "Ken" David Firth: Rejoined Miller in Billy Miller and the Great Blokes (1979–1982), then temporarily with Divinyls (1982) while they replaced out-going bassist Jeremy Paul with Rick Grossman. Firth was in Interchange Bench (1993–1998) with Miller again. He was a session musician on Miller's CDs Victoria (1998) and Elsternwick '69 (2000).
- William "Billy/Bill" Harris Miller: Produced Frank Howson's cover version of The Ferrets' song "Killing Ourselves" (co-written by Howson and Springfield). Wrote the song "Moon and Stars" for the ABC TV series Sweet and Sour in 1984. Session musician on Howson's The Boy Who Dared To Dream LP, member of various bands including: Billy Miller and The Great Blokes (1979–1982), The Spaniards (1983–1986), Interchange Bench (1993–1998), The Dave Graney Show (1998–2004) and Dave Graney ‘n’ The Lurid Yellow Mist (2004–?). Some of these have included Firth or Springfield.

In 2018 Miller started working on a project with former Sports vocalist, Stephen Cummings

- Dave Springfield (aka David John Schofield): Rejoined Miller, briefly, in The Spaniards. Released a country music CD Rev J D Love as Rev J D Love aka David J Schofield.
- Rick Brewer: Later joined The Motivators (1980–1982) and Greg Baker's Blues Party.
- George Cross: Performed in Jim Keays Band during 1999.
- Rick Petropolis: Also in the Motivators (with Brewer) and later in Rattlesnake (1991).

=== 2006: Countdown Spectacular ===
Billy Miller performed "Don't Fall in Love" for the first Countdown Spectacular Tour of Australia from June to August 2006 and can be seen on the associated DVD (disc 1 track 16). Also on this tour were Jon English and John Paul Young from his Jesus Christ Superstar days.

== Members ==
- Philip Eizenberg – guitar (1975–1977)
- Kenneth Firth – bass guitar (1975–1978)
- William Miller – vocals, guitar (1975–1979)
- David Springfield – guitar (1975–1979)
- Rick Brewer – drums (1976–1979)
- Jane Miller – backing vocals, keyboards (1976–1978)
- Pam Miller – backing vocals (1976–1977)
- George Cross – bass guitar (1978)
- Ric Petropolis – bass guitar (1978–1979)

== Discography ==
=== Studio albums ===
List of albums, with selected chart positions and certifications
Title	Album details	Peak chart positions	Certifications
Title	Album details	AUS	Certifications
Dreams of a Love	Released: October 1977; Format: LP; Label: Mushroom Records (L 36437)	20	AUS: Gold
Fame at Any Price	Released: October 1978; Format: LP; Label: Mushroom Records (L 36718)	-	

=== Singles ===
List of singles, with selected chart positions
Year	Title	Peak chart positions	Album
Year	Title	AUS	Album
1977	"Robin Hood"	-	non-album single
1977	"Don't Fall in Love"	2	Dreams of a Love
1977	"Janie May"	25	Dreams of a Love
1978	"Are You Looking At Me?"	-	non-album single
1978	"This Night"	-	Fame at Any Price
1979	"Tripsville"	-	Fame at Any Price

== Awards and nominations ==
=== King of Pop Awards ===
The King of Pop Awards were voted by the readers of TV Week. The King of Pop award started in 1967 and ran through to 1978.

Year	Nominee / work	Award	Result
1977	themselves (on Countdown)	Best Australian TV Performer	Won
