= Zoot (band) =

- Also known as: Down the Line
- Origin: Adelaide, South Australia, Australia
- Genres: Pop rock
- Years active: 1964–1971; 2011; 2018–2022
- Labels: Columbia; EMI; Fanfare Classic
- Spinoffs: Little River Band
- Website: zootlive.com

Zoot were an Australian pop rock band formed in Adelaide, South Australia, in 1964 as Down the Line. They changed their name to Zoot in 1967 and by 1968 had relocated to Melbourne. They had a top-five hit on the Go-Set national singles chart with a heavy rock cover of the Beatles' ballad "Eleanor Rigby" released in 1970, but they disbanded in May 1971.

Mainstay members were Beeb Birtles on bass guitar, later a founder of Little River Band in 1975, and Darryl Cotton on lead vocals, later a solo artist and then a television presenter. Their guitarist and singer-songwriter, Rick Springfield, from 1969 to 1971, moved to the United States in 1972 and achieved international fame as a solo artist, songwriter and actor. Zoot reunited for the Rick Springfield and Friends cruise in November 2011. Darryl Cotton was diagnosed with liver cancer in May 2012 and died in July 2012.

== Career ==
=== 1964–1968: Early years ===
In 1964, Plympton High School friends John D'Arcy, Gordon Rawson and Gerard Bertlekamp (later known as Beeb Birtles) began to learn and play popular songs of the day. Ted Higgins was added and the band was named Times Unlimited. They were joined by Darryl Cotton, lead vocalist from local rivals the Murmen and were renamed Down the Line from The Hollies' version of Roy Orbison's song "Go Go Go (Down the Line)". Down the Line performed covers of English Mod groups such as the Hollies, the Move, the Who and the Small Faces in many clubs and discos around Adelaide, gradually gathering a following.

In May 1967, Darryl Sambell, who also managed rising singer Johnny Farnham, used Down the Line as session musicians on demo recordings which secured Farnham a contract with EMI Records. After recording with Farnham, Down the Line were approached by Adelaide-based promoters Alan Hale and Doc Neeson who were interested in band management and suggested to change their name to "Zoot".

Zoot were playing some original material in their set and by early 1968 decided to move to Melbourne. D'Arcy did not want to go and was replaced on guitar by Steve Stone.

=== 1968–1969: Think Pink ===
In August 1968, Zoot arrived in Melbourne and were co-managed by Wayne de Gruchy and Tony Knight. The group were signed with Columbia Records/EMI Music and recorded their first single, "You'd Better Get Goin' Now", a Jackie Lomax cover with David Mackay producing. Both Higgins and Stone returned to Adelaide and were replaced in September by Rick Brewer on drums (ex-Third Party) and Roger Hicks on lead guitar. It was de Gruchy's idea to create a publicity gimmick, "Think Pink – Think Zoot". On 3 September 1968, de Gruchy invited the music media to Berties discothèque—co-owned by him and Knight—to promote Zoot's debut single. Continuing the "Think Pink" theme, band members were dressed head-to-toe in pink satin and arrived at venues in Cotton's pink painted car. The gimmick brought attention to the group and attracted teenage female fans, however it caused problems in establishing their credibility as serious rock musicians and a backlash from male fans.

By December, management by de Gruchy was dropped in favour of Sambell and Jeff Joseph who also managed Farnham and the Masters Apprentices. The "Think Pink" theme continued. Zoot's second single, "1 × 2 × 3 × 4", recorded by the Birtles, Brewer, Cotton and Hicks line-up, was released in January 1969 and reached No. 32 on the Go-Set National Top 40 singles chart. Besides radio airplay, the band appeared regularly on local pop music TV show Uptight!. The band's third single, "Monty and Me", continued the "Think Pink" theme with Cotton's dog, Monty, dyed pink. The track was produced by Go-Set's writer, Ian Meldrum and reached No. 33 June.

In June 1969, Zoot were voted Top Australian Group in Go-Set's pop poll. In July they undertook a tour through the eastern states with Ronnie Burns, the Sect and Jon Blanchfield on the bill. In September 1969, Hicks left for the Avengers, and was replaced by Rick Springfield (ex-Icy Blues, Moppa Blues Band, Wickedy Wak). Also in that month, Zoot joined other Australian bands on the national Operation Starlift tour, which was generally a publicity success but a financial failure. For Zoot, it also brought about increased media ridicule, peer envy and scorn from detractors, much of the criticism was homophobia such as "pretty pink pansies" taunts. In October 1969 they issued another single, "About Time"/"Sha La La". In December they made headlines when they were assaulted by street toughs in Brisbane.

=== 1970–1971: New image, Just Zoot and break up ===
By early 1970, band members had tired of the garish pink outfits and associated harassment and physical abuse. To rid themselves of the bubblegum/teen idol image, they burnt their outfits on TV music show Happening '70. In April 1970, Zoot promoted their single "Hey Pinky" with an advertisement in Go-Set which featured a nude picture of their buttocks. "Hey Pinky" was a hard charging guitar-oriented song but it failed to chart. The song was rebellious in nature and openly mocked the pink outfits as well as their previous management and their detractors.

The group's debut studio album, Just Zoot, was released in July 1970 and reached number 12 on the Australian Kent Music Report. In August 1970, Zoot finished second to the Flying Circus at the Hoadley's Battle of the Sounds competition.

In December 1970, Zoot released a hard rock cover of the Beatles' song "Eleanor Rigby". It became their most popular single when it peaked at No. 4 in March 1971. It remained in the Top 40 for twenty weeks and reached No. 12 on the Top Records for the Year of 1971. Their next single, "The Freak" / "Evil Child", another hard rock song, was released in April 1971 and peaked in the top 30.

With the chart success of "Eleanor Rigby", RCA expressed interest in bringing them to the United States to record, but they encountered problems with visa work permits and Springfield was being scouted for a solo career. Along with other disappointments and frustrations this led to the band breaking up in May 1971. Go-Set published its 1971 pop poll results in July, with Zoot in third place behind Daddy Cool for Best Group, while "Eleanor Rigby" won Best Single ahead of Daddy Cool's "Eagle Rock". EMI/Columbia released a compilation, Zoot Out late in 1971.

=== 1971–present: After break-up ===
After Zoot, Birtles and Cotton almost immediately formed a duo called Darryl and Beeb, which became Frieze when they were sponsored by Frieze Brothers (a clothing company). The band released a single, "Feelings", in September 1971 on Sparmac Records and an album, BC 1972, on Warner Brothers in June 1972 using session musicians. Frieze disbanded in May and Cotton travelled to America while Birtles joined Mississippi (previously known as Allison Gros and then as Drummond). Mississippi evolved into Little River Band in 1975.

Springfield also signed with Sparmac and released "Speak to the Sky" in October 1971, which peaked at No. 6 on the Kent Music Report. Sparmac's label owner, Robie Porter, was also producer and manager for Springfield. After recording his debut album, Beginnings, in London, Springfield moved to the United States in mid-1972 where he achieved international fame as a solo artist, songwriter and actor and continues to record.

Brewer drummed for a succession of bands including, Cashbox, Bootleg, Whole Man and I'Tambu before joining the Ferrets in 1976, which had a No. 2 hit with "Don't Fall in Love" on the Australian Kent Music Report Singles Chart. He has also drummed for Jim Keays (ex-the Masters Apprentices) in his band Southern Cross and subsequently for the Motivators and Greg Baker's Blues Party.

=== 2011–present: Reunion and Archaeology ===
Zoot reformed for the Rick Springfield and Friends cruise in November 2011. The cruise took place from 5–10 November 2011 on the Carnival Destiny out of Miami. The band consisted of Springfield, Birtles, Cotton and Brewer.

Darryl Cotton died on 27 July 2012 from liver cancer.

In 2018, the band released an anthology entitled Archaeology, including a new recording of "Life in a Northern Town".

In late 2020, Zoot were scheduled to reform for four Australian shows, with a line-up consisting of band friend and contemporary Russell Morris joining Springfield, Birtles and Brewer; however, owing to COVID-19, the tour was postponed to 2022. In April 2022, it was announced that the tour had been cancelled.

On 24 June 2022, Zoot released "That Was Then".

== Members ==
- Beeb Birtles – bass guitar, guitar, backing vocals (1964–1971, 2011)
- Darryl Cotton – lead vocals, guitar (1964–1971, 2011; died 2012)
- Teddy Higgins – drums (1964–1968)
- John D'Arcy – lead guitar, backing vocals (1964–1968)
- Steve Stone – lead guitar (1968)
- Rick Brewer – drums (1968–1971, 2011)
- Roger Hicks – lead guitar (1968–1969)
- Rick Springfield – lead guitar, backing vocals (1969–1971, 2011)

== Discography ==
=== Studio albums ===
List of studio albums, with Australian chart positions
Title	Album details	Peak chart positions
Title	Album details	AUS
Just Zoot	Released: July 1970; Label: Columbia (SCXO 7916); Format: Vinyl	12

=== Compilation and live albums ===
List of compilation and live albums
Title	Album details
Zoot Out	Released: 1971; Label: Columbia (SCXO 9842); Format: Vinyl
Zoot Locker	Released: 1971; Label: EMI (EMY-502); Format: 2xCD + DVD
Live - The Reunion	Released: 2013; Label: Fanfare Records (FANFARE117); Format: 2xCD + DVD
Archaeology	Released: 23 November 2018; Label: EMI (7720473); Format: CD, digital download, streaming

=== Extended plays ===
List of Extended Plays
Title	Album details
4 Shades of Pink	Released: 1970; Label: EMI; Format: Vinyl

=== Singles ===
Year	Title	Peak chart positions		Album
Year	Title	Go-Set	KMR	Album
1968	"You'd Better Get Goin' Now"	—	87	Just Zoot
1968	"1 × 2 × 3 × 4"	32	25	Just Zoot
1969	"Monty and Me"	33	36	Just Zoot
1969	"About Time" / "Sha La La"	—	73	Just Zoot
1970	"Hey Pinky" / "Strange Things"	—	61	Zoot Out
1970	"Eleanor Rigby"	4	4	Zoot Out
1971	"Evil Child" / "The Freak"	27	27	Zoot Out
2022	"That Was Then"	-	-	non album single
"—" denotes a recording that did not chart or was not released in that territory.

== Awards and nominations ==
=== Battle of the Sounds ===
The Hoadley's Battle of the Sounds was an annual national rock/pop band competition held in Australia from 1966 to 1972.

Year	Nominee / work	Award	Result
1970	themselves	Battle of the Sounds National Final	2nd

=== Go-Set Pop Poll ===
The Go-Set Pop Poll was coordinated by teen-oriented pop music newspaper, Go-Set and was established in February 1966 and conducted an annual poll during 1966 to 1972 of its readers to determine the most popular personalities.

Year	Nominee / work	Award	Result
1969	themselves	Best Australian Group	1st
1970	themselves	Best Australian Group	5th
1970	Ricky Springfield	Best Australian Guitarist	2nd
1970	Rick Brewer	Best Australian Drummer	3rd
1970	Ricky Springfield	Best Australian Composer	5th
1971	themselves	Best Australian Group	3rd
1971	Darryl Cotton	Best Australian Male Vocal	6th
1971	Ricky Springfield	Best Australian Guitarist	1st
1971	Rick Brewer	Best Australian Drummer	2nd
1971	Ricky Springfield	Best Australian Songwriter/Composer	4th
1971	"Eleanor Rigby"	Best Australian Single	1st
1971	Beeb Birtles	Best Australian Bass Guitarist	2nd

=== South Australian Music Awards ===
The South Australian Music Awards are annual awards that exist to recognise, promote and celebrate excellence in the South Australian contemporary music industry. They commenced in 2012. The South Australian Music Hall of Fame celebrates the careers of successful music industry personalities.

Year	Nominee / work	Award	Result	Ref.
2017	Zoot	Hall of Fame	inductee	
