= List of space races =

The following is a list of space races, meaning competitions or rivalries between states or companies involving the development of space travel.

== List ==
=== Rivalries and political competitions ===
- Space Race, the Cold War geopolitical rivalry between the United States and the Soviet Union in space primacy
  - Moon Race, the race to have the first human landing on the Moon
- Mars race, the rivalry between teams to put the first humans on or about the planet Mars
- Billionaire space race, the entrepreneurial rivalry for private spaceflight dominance mainly between Jeff Bezos, Richard Branson, and Elon Musk.
- New Space Race, the renewed 21st-century competition in space exploration.

=== Prize competitions ===
- Ansari X Prize, the first X Prize Foundation prize for achieving repeated suborbital spaceflights using a space tourism capable vehicle, which was won by the SpaceShipOne team of Mojave Aerospace Ventures composed of Scaled Composites, Burt Rutan, Paul Allen and Vulcan Inc.
- Google Lunar X Prize, the X Prize Foundation prize sponsored by Google to put a robotic rover onto the Moon, currently ongoing
- America's Space Prize, the Bigelow Aerospace sponsored prize to create an American orbital space tourism capable vehicle, won by no team

== See also ==
- Space competition
- NASA Centennial Challenges
- List of vehicle speed records — for literal speed records of space vessels
- List of spaceflight records — for literal speed records of spacecraft
