= The Race for Space =

The Race for Space may refer to:

- Space Race, Cold War geopolitical powered race for space primacy
- The Race for Space (film), a 1959 American documentary film
- Black Sky: The Race for Space (2004), a Discovery Channel documentary about the Ansari X-Prize and SpaceShipOne
- The Race for Space (album), a 2015 album by the band Public Service Broadcasting

== See also ==
- Race to Space, 2001 drama film set in the 1960s Space Race
- "Race to Space" (Masters of Sex), season 1 episode 2 aired 6 October 2013
- Buzz Aldrin's Race Into Space, 1993 space simulation computer game
- Space Race (disambiguation)
