= Dreams of a Love =

Studio album by the Ferrets
- Released: October 1977
- Recorded: 19 July 1976 – 15 August 1977
- Studios: Armstrong Studios, South Melbourne
- Genres: Pop; pop-rock
- Labels: Mushroom; Festival
- Producers: Willie Everfinish; the Ferrets

The Ferrets chronology
Dreams of a Love (1977)	Fame at Any Price (1978)

Singles from Dreams of a Love
- 1. "Don't Fall in Love" Released: June 1977; 2. "Janie May" Released: October 1977

Dreams of a Love is the debut studio album by Australian pop-rock band, the Ferrets. Released in October 1977, it peaked at number 20 on the Australian Kent Music Report albums chart. Its production was started by Ian "Molly" Meldrum under the pseudonym, Willie Everfinish – after almost a year the group, assisted by audio engineers Tony Cohen and Ian MacKenzie, finalised the work.

== Background ==
The Ferrets had formed in 1975 and early in the following year they recorded a demo tape, which they sent to Ian "Molly" Meldrum, talent coordinator for Australian Broadcasting Corporation (ABC) pop music TV series, Countdown. Meldrum had them signed to Mushroom Records and started producing their debut album, Dreams of a Love, in July 1976.

After nearly a year, production of the album was still incomplete, so the Ferrets took over — assisted by recording engineers, Tony Cohen and Ian MacKenzie — Meldrum was attributed as "Willie Everfinish". In June 1977 they released "Don't Fall in Love" as a single, which they performed on Countdown, it peaked at No. 2 on the Kent Music Report singles chart. Dreams of a Love followed in October and achieved gold record status. The album cover depicted a model, Wendy Bannister, holding a snarling ferret at her shoulder.

== Reception ==
The Australian said, "A grand debut, overseen by Ian Meldrum. "Just Like the Stars" is akin to the Beatles at their best. Billy Miller's mum sat knitting in the studio: 'Mmm, yes that sounds very good.'"

== Track listing ==
LP/Cassette

Side A
No.	Title	Writer(s)	Length
1.	"Prelude"	The Ferrets	0:45
2.	"You Belong with Me"	Martin Falls, William Miller, David Springfield (a.k.a. David Schofield)	3:43
3.	"Bye Bye Baby"	Springfield	2:37
4.	"Lies"	Kenneth Firth, Ian Davis	4:25
5.	"Killing Ourselves"	Frank Howson, Schofield	3:40
6.	"Janie May"	Falls, Miller	4:23
7.	"Dreams of a Love" (featuring The National Boys Choir)	Falls, Miller	6:03

Side B
No.	Title	Writer(s)	Length
1.	"My Old Dog"	Firth	3:31
2.	"El Quicko"	Firth	4:04
3.	"Don't Fall in Love"	Firth, Davis	3:13
4.	"The Children Play" (featuring The National Boys Choir)	Falls, Miller	3:28
5.	"Just Like the Star" (featuring The National Boys Choir)	Falls, Miller, Schofield	5:37
6.	"Magic in the Sand"	Miller	3:08

== Personnel ==
The Ferrets

- Philip Eizenberg – guitar
- Kenneth Firth – bass guitar, backing vocals
- William "Billy" Miller – lead vocals, guitar, strings (arranger)
- David Springfield – guitar
- Rick Brewer – drums, percussion
- Jane Miller – backing vocals, keyboards
- Pam Miller – backing vocals

Additional musicians

- Kevin Kasey – choir conductor
- David Springfield – guitar, backing vocals
- Dave Clarke – flute (track 13)
- Brian Godden – banjo (track 6)
- Chris Harold – synthesiser (tracks 7, 12)
- Nicky Hopkins – piano, voice (track 3)
- Peter Jones – strings arranger (tracks 1, 7, 9, 12–13)
- Bobby Keys – saxophone (track 2)
- Ian Mason – synthesiser (track 7)
- Ian Mawson – piano (tracks 2, 5, 7, 9, 11), organ (track 12)
- National Boys Choir – choir vocals (tracks 7, 11–12)
- Manny Paterakis – percussion (track 7)
- Peter Whitford – percussion (tracks 5, 9, 11)

Recording details

- Audio engineer – Tony Cohen, Ian McKenzie
- Producer – Willie Everfinish, the Ferrets

Art works

- Artwork – Bill Burrows, Mushroom Art, Steve Malpass
- Illustration – George Lazerides
- Photograph, cover – Derek Hughes

== Charts ==
Chart (1977)	Peak position
Australian (Kent Music Report)	20
