= Not from Here =

Studio album by Mi-Sex
- Released: 9 September 2016
- Genre: Electro-rock, rock
- Label: Golden Robot Records
- Producer: Mi-Sex

Mi-Sex chronology
Extended Play (2016)	Not from Here (2016)

Singles from Not from Here
- 1. "My Sex Your Sex " Released: 3 June 2016

Not from Here is the fifth studio album by New Zealand band Mi-Sex. It is the first studio album by the band since Where Do They Go? in 1983. The album features lead vocals by Steve Balbi. Balbi joined Travis New on guitar, alongside original Mi-Sex members Don Martin, Murray Burns, Paul Dunningham and Colin Bayley.

The album was released in September 2016 and peaked at number 93 on the Australian ARIA Charts.

== Background and release ==
Mi-Sex formed in 1977 and released four studio albums between 1979-1983. The band split in 1986. The band’s original singer Steve Gilpin died from a car crash in 1992.

In 2011, the band reunited for a fundraiser following the 2011 Christchurch earthquake with original members Don Martin, Murray Burns, Paul Dunningham and Colin Bayley joining with singer Steve Balbi and guitarist Travis New. The band continued to write new material 'for pleasure' with keyboardist Murray Burns saying "We just didn't want to go out and feel like a band playing our old repertoire. We'd never expect a crowd to want to hear a whole lot of new songs, but we'd like to think we could play a few in a show. And we also thought it would be great to see what Mi-Sex writing and recording in 2016 would sound like – as opposed to 1984."

Ill health forced Burns' usual Mi-Sex songwriting collaborator Kevin Stanton out of the band. Burns turned to Colin Bailey who had joined the line-up when Stanton had earlier taken a break in 1982. The pair were joined in their writing endeavours by one Mi-Sex's most recent acquisitions, Steve Balbi.

== Track listing ==
1. "Surrender" - 5:24
2. "Apart" - 4:02
3. "My Sex Your Sex" - 3:28
4. "Your Life" - 3:59
5. "Running at the Speed of Sound" - 3:27
6. "The Real Life" - 4:22
7. "Somebody" - 3:48
8. "Makes No Sense" - 3:54
9. "Animal" - 3:50
10. "I'm a Fool" - 5:09
- all tracks written by Colin Bayley, Murray Burns and Steve Balbi, except track 3, with Bruce Butler.

== Charts ==
Chart (2016)	Peak position
Australian ARIA Charts	93

== Release history ==
Country	Date	Format	Label	Catalogue
Australia	9 September 2016	CD, digital download	Mi-Sex/ Golden Robot Records	GOLDRR008
