= Computer Games (song) =

Single by Mi-Sex

from the album Graffiti Crimes
- Released: September 1979 (Australia/NZ)
- Recorded: 1979
- Genre: Synth-pop
- Length: 3:54
- Label: CBS
- Songwriters: Murray Burns; Steve Gilpin; Kevin Stanton; Phillip Deppeler
- Producer: Peter Dawkins

Mi-Sex singles chronology
"But You Don't Care" (1979)	"Computer Games" (1979)	"People" (1980)

"Computer Games" is a song by New Zealand band Mi-Sex, released in September 1979 in Australia and New Zealand as the second single from their debut studio album, Graffiti Crimes (1979). The song peaked at number 1 in Australia and 5 in New Zealand. The music video was filmed on location at what was at the time Control Data Corporation's North Sydney centre and included gameplay from the 1979 arcade games Speed Freak, Basketball and Star Fire. The single won the award for Best Australian Single at the 1979 TV Week/Countdown Music Awards.

The single was also released in Europe and North America, as well as South Africa where the band's name was altered to MS to satisfy censorship.

The song was also re-recorded as the final track for the band's 1983 album Where Do They Go?, a dub version was the 12" B-side of their 1983 single "Lost Time" and again on the 2016 EP Extended Play.

== Reception ==
Musicologist Ian McFarlane opined that it was an "electro-pop anthem... with its simplistic, brain-teasing riff and Gilpin's mannered vocal yelps, "Computer Games" boasted little substance but was constructed for maximum effect. It came to epitomise the one word which has plagued the memory of Mi-Sex: 'contrived'."

Stewart Mason from AllMusic said "Steve Gilpin's theatrical vocals, full of Brian Connolly-style hiccups and leaps into falsetto, are an interesting counterpoint to the unvarying electronic rhythm, particularly on the memorable stuttering chorus." Cash Box said, "This avant-pop band has taken the sound first pioneered by Eno and Ultravox and molded it into more of a hard rock sound. The band employs witty future-orientated lyrics to augment the swirling synthesized sounds."

== Track listings ==
Australia/New Zealand 7" (BA 222563)

1. "Computer Games" – 3:54
2. "Wot Do You Want?" – 2:55

Australian 12"

1. "Computer Games" (Disco Version) – 4:41
2. "Graffiti Crimes" – 3:49

Spanish version

1. "Juego De Computadoras (Computer Games)" – 3:54
2. "Que Queres? (Wot Do You Want?)" – 2:55

United Kingdom dance version

1. "Computer Games" (Special Dance Mix) – 6:17
2. "Wot Do You Want?" – 2:55

== Charts ==
=== Weekly charts ===
Weekly chart performance for "Computer Games"
Chart (1979–1981)	Peak position
Australia (Kent Music Report)	1
Austria (Ö3 Austria Top 40)	16
Netherlands (Single Top 100)	44
New Zealand (Recorded Music NZ)	5
US Hot Dance Club Songs	61

=== Year-end charts ===
1979 year-end chart performance for "Computer Games"
Chart (1979)	Rank
Australia (Kent Music Report)	19

1980 year-end chart performance for "Computer Games"
Chart (1980)	Rank
Australia (Kent Music Report)	68

== Certifications ==
Certifications for "Computer Games"
Region	Certification	Certified units/sales
New Zealand (RMNZ)	Gold	15,000^{‡}
^{‡} Sales+streaming figures based on certification alone.

== See also ==
- List of number-one singles in Australia during the 1970s
