= Blue Day (Mi-Sex song) =

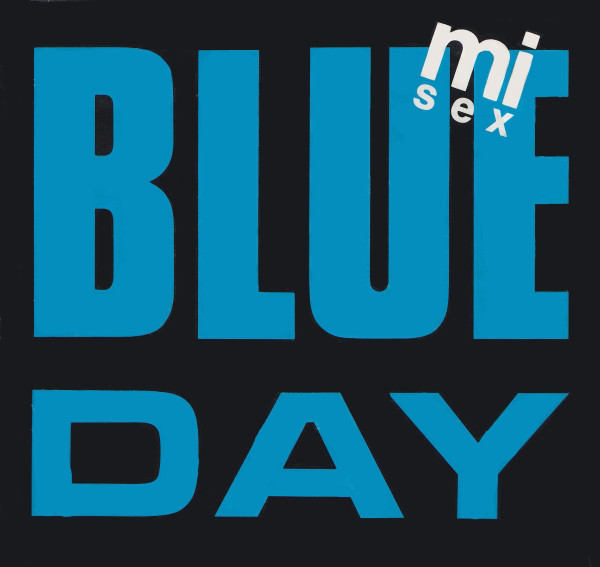
- Australian 7" art work

Single by Mi-Sex

from the album Where Do They Go?
- B-side: "Lady Janice"
- Released: February 1984
- Studio: Rhinoceros Studio, Sydney Australia
- Genre: Pop, electronic, new wave, Pop rock
- Label: CBS
- Songwriter(s): Murray Burns, Colin Bayley
- Producer(s): Bob Clearmountain

Mi-Sex singles chronology
"Only Thinking" (1983)	"Blue Day" (1984)	"5 O'Clock (In the Morning)" (1984)

"Blue Day" is a song by New Zealand group Mi-Sex, released in February 1984 as the second single from their fourth studio album, Where Do They Go? (1983). The song peaked at number 24 in Australia.

== Track listings ==
Australia/New Zealand 7" (BA 223149)

1. "Blue Day"
2. "Lady Janice"

Australia 12" (BA 12069)

- Side A1 "Blue Day"
- Side B1 "Castaway" (U.S. Version)
- Side B2 "Delinquent Daddy" (Extended Version)

United Kingdom 7" (CBS – A4302)

1. "Blue Day"
2. "Don't Look Back in Anger"

== Charts ==
Chart (1984)	Peak position
Australian Kent Music Report	24

== Cover versions ==
In 1999, New Zealand artist Nicolette recorded an "upbeat dance version" the song, which peaked at number 20 on the New Zealand charts, much to the delight of Mi-Sex's member Colin Bayley, whom Nicolette has been busy writing songs with in Sydney.

In 2014, Australian band FreedomBLUE recorded a version of the song which aired that year on Channel Seven's annual Telethon weekend; a 24-hour annual televised fundraiser for children's hospitals.

Chart (1999)	Peak position
New Zealand (Recorded Music NZ)	20
