= Graffiti Crimes =

Studio album by Mi-Sex
- Released: July 1979
- Recorded: April & May 1979
- Studios: Studios 301, Sydney, Australia
- Genre: New wave
- Length: 41:26
- Label: CBS
- Producer: Peter Dawkins

Mi-Sex chronology
Graffiti Crimes (1979)	Space Race (1980)

Singles from Graffiti Crimes
- 1. "But You Don't Care" Released: May 1979; 2. "Computer Games" Released: 1 October 1979

Computer Games cover
- International edition

Graffiti Crimes was the debut studio album by New Zealand new wave music group Mi-Sex, released in July 1979. The album peaked at number six on the New Zealand albums chart and number 16 on the Australian Kent Music Report. The album was certified gold in New Zealand.

The album was re-released in January 1980 following the success of the single "Computer Games," which peaked at number one in Australia in November 1979. "Computer Games" was added to the track listing on track 1, Side Two.

The album was titled Computer Games for the international release.

Kevin Stanton said it was his hand holding the policeman's notebook on the cover of the album and his girlfriend posing by the wall.

== Reception ==
Professional ratings
Review scores
Source	Rating
AllMusic	4.5/5 stars

Luis Feliu of The Canberra Times felt, "The songs are all well rounded with a beginning, middle and end, and pulsating rhythms for the colourful lyrics to bounce off. Hardly any time wasted between cuts too, straight into the next song. Naturally, this sort of music has to be played at a gutsy volume level."

== Track listing ==
Vinyl/cassette (237329) Side one
No.	Title	Writer(s)	Length
1.	"Graffiti Crimes"	Kevin Stanton	3:52
2.	"Wot Do You Want?"	Stanton, Don Martin, Murray Burns, Richard Hodgkinson, Steve Gilpin	2:58
3.	"But You Don't Care"	Stanton, Burns	4:06
4.	"Not Such a Bad Boy"	Stanton, Burns, Gilpin	2:45
5.	"Stills"	Stanton, Gilpin	5:56

Side two
No.	Title	Writer(s)	Length
1.	"Computer Games" (not included on the original pressing)	Stanton, Burns, Gilpin	4:00
2.	"21-20"	Stanton, Gilpin	3:15
3.	"I Wanna Be with You"	Colin Bayley	2:43
4.	"Camera Kazi"	Winch	5:28
5.	"A Loser"	Martin, Stanton, Hodgkinson, Gilpin	2:58
6.	"Inside You"	Stanton	3:18

== Charts ==
=== Weekly charts ===
Chart (1979–80)	Peak position
Australian (Kent Music Report)	16
New Zealand Albums (RMNZ)	6
Canada Top Albums/CDs (RPM)	87

=== Year-end charts ===
Chart (1980)	Rank
New Zealand	18

== Certifications ==
Region	Certification	Certified units/sales
Australia (ARIA)	Platinum	50,000^{^}
^{^} Shipments figures based on certification alone.
