= Castaway (Mi-Sex song) =

- Australian/New Zealand art work

Single by Mi-Sex
- B-side: "Young Maniacs"
- Released: May 1982
- Studio: Studios 301, Sydney, Australia
- Genre: Synth-pop, electronic
- Length: 3:25
- Label: CBS
- Songwriters: Murray Burns, Kevin Stanton, Paul Dunningham, Steve Gilpin
- Producer: Peter McIan

Mi-Sex singles chronology
"Shanghaied!" (1981)	"Castaway" (1982)	"Down the Line (Makin' Love on the Telephone)" (1982)

"Castaway" is a song by New Zealand group Mi-Sex, released in May 1982. The song peaked at number 23 in Australia.

== Track listings ==
Australia/New Zealand 7" (BA 222930)

1. "Castaway"
2. "Young Maniacs"

North America 7" (Epic – 34–04419)

1. "Castaway" - 3:25
2. "Don't Look Back in Anger" - 3:16

== Charts ==
Chart (1981)	Peak position
Australian Kent Music Report	23
