= But You Don't Care =

Single by Mi-Sex

from the album Graffiti Crimes
- B-side: "Burning Up"
- Released: May 1979
- Recorded: April & May 1979
- Studio: Studios 301, Sydney, Australia
- Genre: Synth-pop, electronic
- Length: 3:58
- Label: CBS
- Songwriter(s): Murray Burns, Kevin Stanton
- Producer(s): Peter Dawkins

Mi-Sex singles chronology
"Straight Laddie" (1978)	"But You Don't Care" (1979)	"Computer Games" (1979)

"But You Don't Care" is a song by New Zealand group Mi-Sex, released in June 1979 as the lead single from their debut studio album, Graffiti Crimes (1979). The song was the band's first on CBS records and became the band's first charting single, peaking at number 33 in New Zealand and 25 in Australia.

== Music video ==
The video places the band members amongst oversized pieces on a giant chess board.

== Track listings ==
Australia/New Zealand 7" (BA 222542)

1. "But You Don't Care" - 3:58
2. "Burning Up" - 3:02

== Charts ==
Chart (1979)	Peak position
Australian Kent Music Report	25
New Zealand (Recorded Music NZ)	33
