= Falling In and Out =

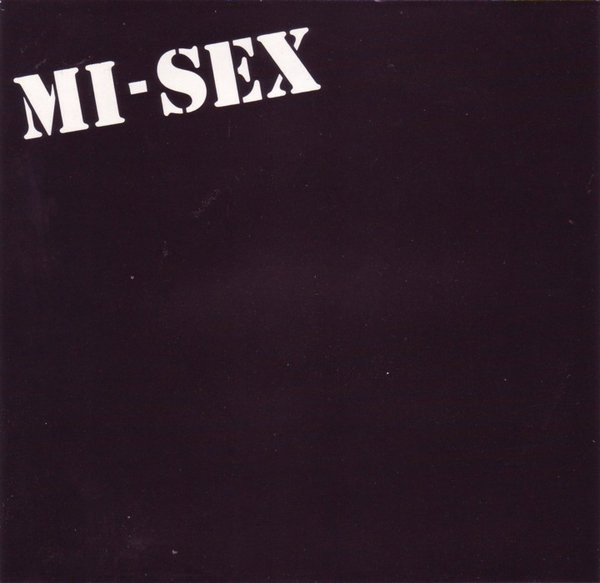
- Australian art work

Single by Mi-Sex

from the album Shanghaied!
- Released: April 1981
- Studio: Music Farm Studios, Byron Bay, Australia
- Genre: Synth-pop, electronic, new wave
- Label: CBS
- Songwriter(s): Murray Burns, Kevin Stanton
- Producer(s): John Sayers, Mi-Sex

Mi-Sex singles chronology
"It Only Hurts When I'm Laughing" (1980)	"Falling In and Out" (1981)	"Missing Person" (1981)

"Falling In and Out" is a song by New Zealand group Mi-Sex, released in April 1981 as the lead single from their third studio album, Shanghaied! (1981). The song peaked at number 48 in New Zealand and 20 in Australia.

== Track listings ==
Australia/New Zealand 7" (BA 222809)

1. "Falling In and Out"
2. "Round and Round"

== Charts ==
Chart (1981)	Peak position
Australian Kent Music Report	20
New Zealand (Recorded Music NZ)	48
