= People (Mi-Sex song) =

- International art work

Single by Mi-Sex

from the album Space Race
- B-side: "Pages and Matches"
- Released: March 1980
- Recorded: January 1980
- Studio: Music Farm Studios, Byron Bay, Australia
- Genre: Synth-pop, electronic
- Length: 3:49
- Label: CBS
- Songwriter(s): Murray Burns, Kevin Stanton, Steve Gilpin
- Producer(s): Peter Dawkins

Mi-Sex singles chronology
"Computer Games" (1979)	"People" (1980)	"Space Race" (1980)

"People" is a song by New Zealand group Mi-Sex, released in March 1980 as the lead single from their second studio album, Space Race (1980). The song peaked at number 3 in New Zealand and 6 in Australia.

== Music video ==
The video includes some visual special effects in the spoken segment.

== Track listings ==
Australia/New Zealand 7" (BA 222652)

1. "People" - 3:49
2. "Pages and Matches" - 2:29

== Charts ==
Weekly chart performance for "People"
Chart (1980)	Peak position
Australia (Kent Music Report)	6
New Zealand (Recorded Music NZ)	3

=== Year-end charts ===
Year-end chart performance for "People"
Chart (1980)	Position
Australia (Kent Music Report)	37
New Zealand (RIANZ)	26
