= Roger Glanville-Hicks =

Australian musician

- Born: Roger Anthony Glanville-Hicks; 10 September 1950 (age 75); Melbourne, Australia
- Genres: Pop, rock, classical
- Occupation: Musician
- Instruments: Acoustic guitar; electric guitar; theorbo; lute
- Years active: 1968–2013
- Formerly of: Zoot, Russell Morris Band

Roger Anthony Glanville-Hicks (born 10 September 1950) is an Australian former rock and classical musician. As Roger Hicks, he was the lead guitarist in the pop group Zoot from 1968 to 1969 before relocating to Brisbane, where he joined another group, the Avengers. Hicks provided acoustic guitar for Russell Morris's first two singles, "The Real Thing" and "Part Three into Paper Walls" (both 1969) – both reached No. 1 on the Go-Set National Top 40 singles chart. Under his full name, he returned to his classical music origins, during the 1970s. He subsequently provided classical guitar for theatre productions, theorbo for ensemble performances and lute for films.

== Biography ==
Roger Anthony Glanville-Hicks was born in Melbourne on 10 September 1950 to Patricia (née Daley, c. 1921–1988) and Beric Glanville-Hicks (1917–2004), a medical doctor and former World War 2 army captain. He is the nephew of Australian composer Peggy Glanville-Hicks (1912–1990). Glanville-Hicks was raised in Toorak with two siblings and trained as a classical guitarist.

Australian pop rock group, Zoot had relocated from Adelaide to Melbourne in mid-1968 with the line-up of Beeb Birtles on vocals and bass guitar, Daryl Cotton on lead vocals and guitar, Ted Higgins on drums and Steve Stone on guitar. After they recorded their first single, "You Better Get Going Now", Higgins and Stone both returned to Adelaide. Glanville-Hicks replaced Stone and Rick Brewer replaced Higgins in September 1968. Their talent manager Wayne de Gruchy designed a publicity campaign, "Think Pink – Think Zoot", whereby all members wore pink. The guitarist was hospitalised in November 1968 after a traffic collision while he was travelling in Zoot's van. He was recorded on Zoot's next two singles, "One Times, Two Times, Three Times, Four" (January 1969) and "Monty and Me" (June) and the related extended play, 4 Shades of Pink (1969). Glanville-Hicks left Zoot in September 1969 due to his dissatisfaction with the ongoing "Think Pink" publicity campaign and was replaced on guitar by Rick Springfield.

Earlier in 1969, as a session musician, Glanville-Hicks performed the acoustic guitar introduction to Russell Morris's "The Real Thing" (1969), which became the most recognisable "hook" to the song. He also played all the acoustic guitar parts in Morris's follow up single, "Part Three into Paper Walls" (1969), which ends with a reprise of the opening statement from "The Real Thing". Both "The Real Thing" and "Part Three into Paper Walls" reached No. 1 on the Go-Set National Top 40 singles chart in Australia. He relocated to Brisbane where he joined the Avengers (sometimes referred to as Brisbane Avangers) alongside Julian Jones on vocals (ex-Breed), Keith Kerwin on guitar, Don Lebler on drums and Andy Tait on bass guitar.

He had worked on El Cimarrón, in 1976 at music festivals in Adelaide and Sydney. In October 1980 Glanville-Hicks provided classical guitar for the musical theatre production of El Cimarrón at Universal Theatre, North Fitzroy. In 1985 he was heard on Australian Broadcasting Corporation (ABC) radio's ABC-FM; he provided lute and chittarone (large lute-like instrument) for visiting tenor Gerald English. Glanville-Hicks also performed in ensembles providing theorbo, a Baroque musical instrument. The musician played theorbo for The 43rd Intervarsity Choral Festival, Hobart as a member of a chamber orchestra in 1992 and for "A Purcell Celebration" at Xavier College Chapel, Kew in 1995. He provided lute for Paul Cox's feature film Innocence (2000). The musician had met the director when both lived in the same village in southern France, "Cox thought a lute might add variety and interest to the score." Glanville-Hicks took the minor role of "Lute Player" in the director's film Human Touch (2004) and Antwan in Cox's short film To Music (2013).
