= Mars race =

Attempts by various countries to land a human on Mars

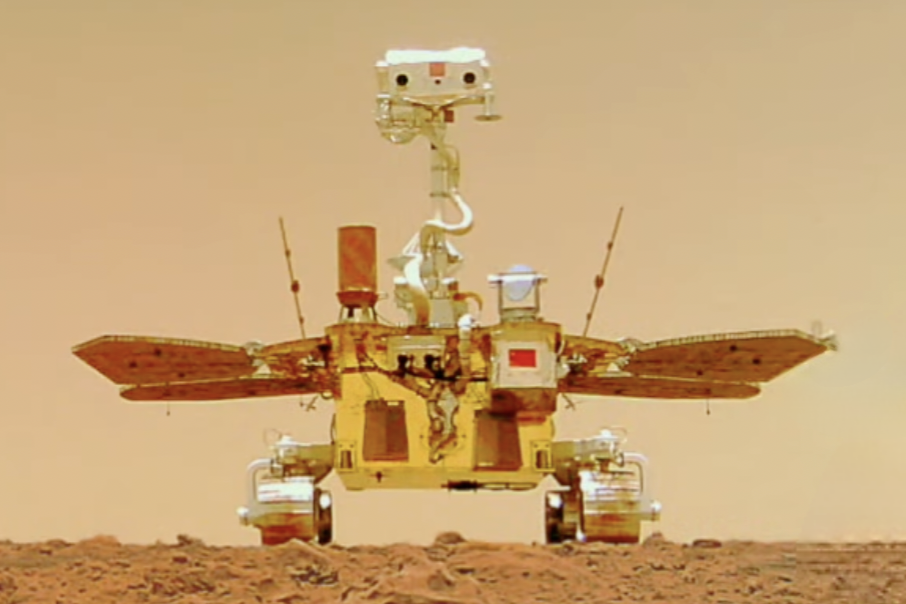
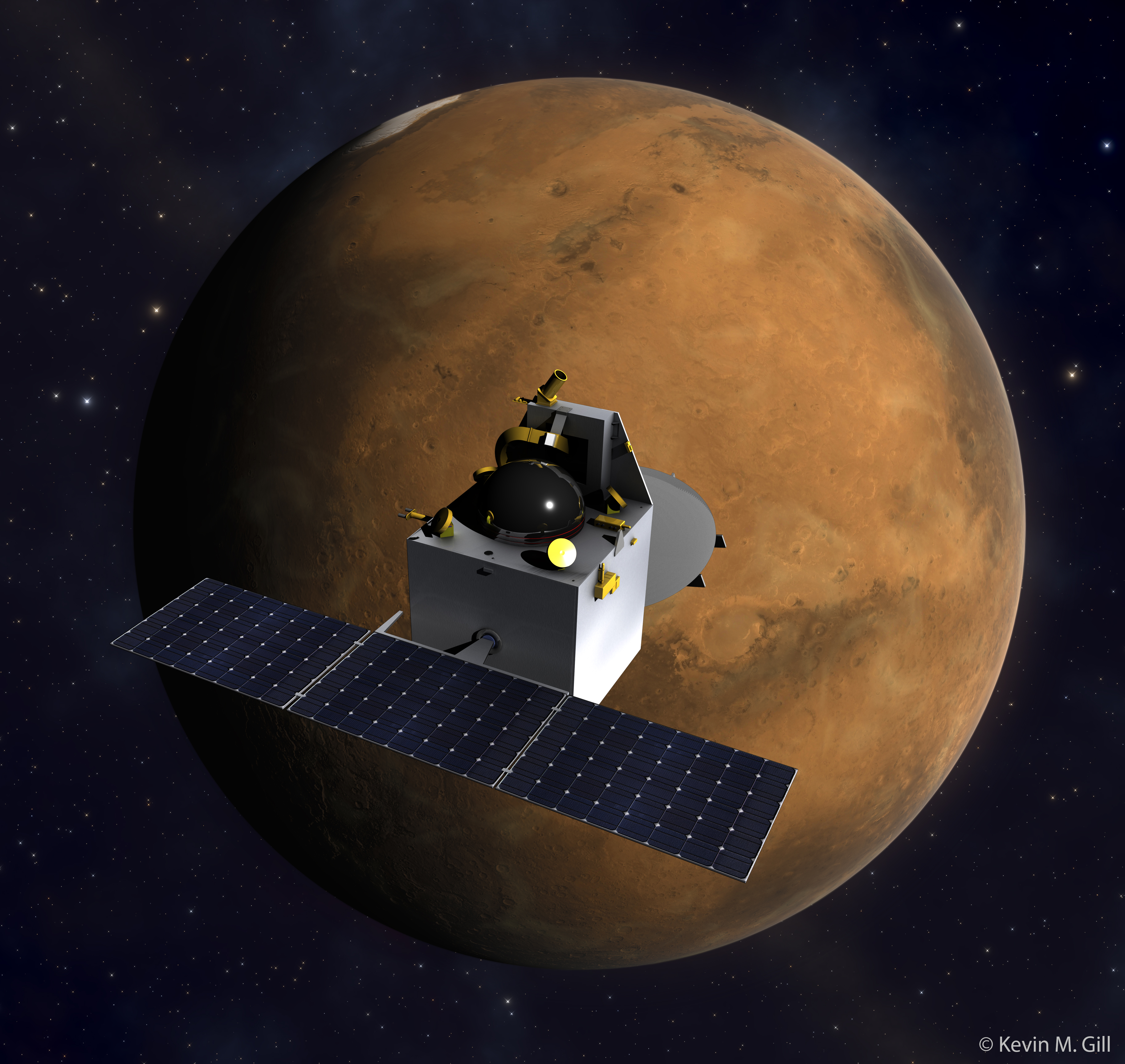
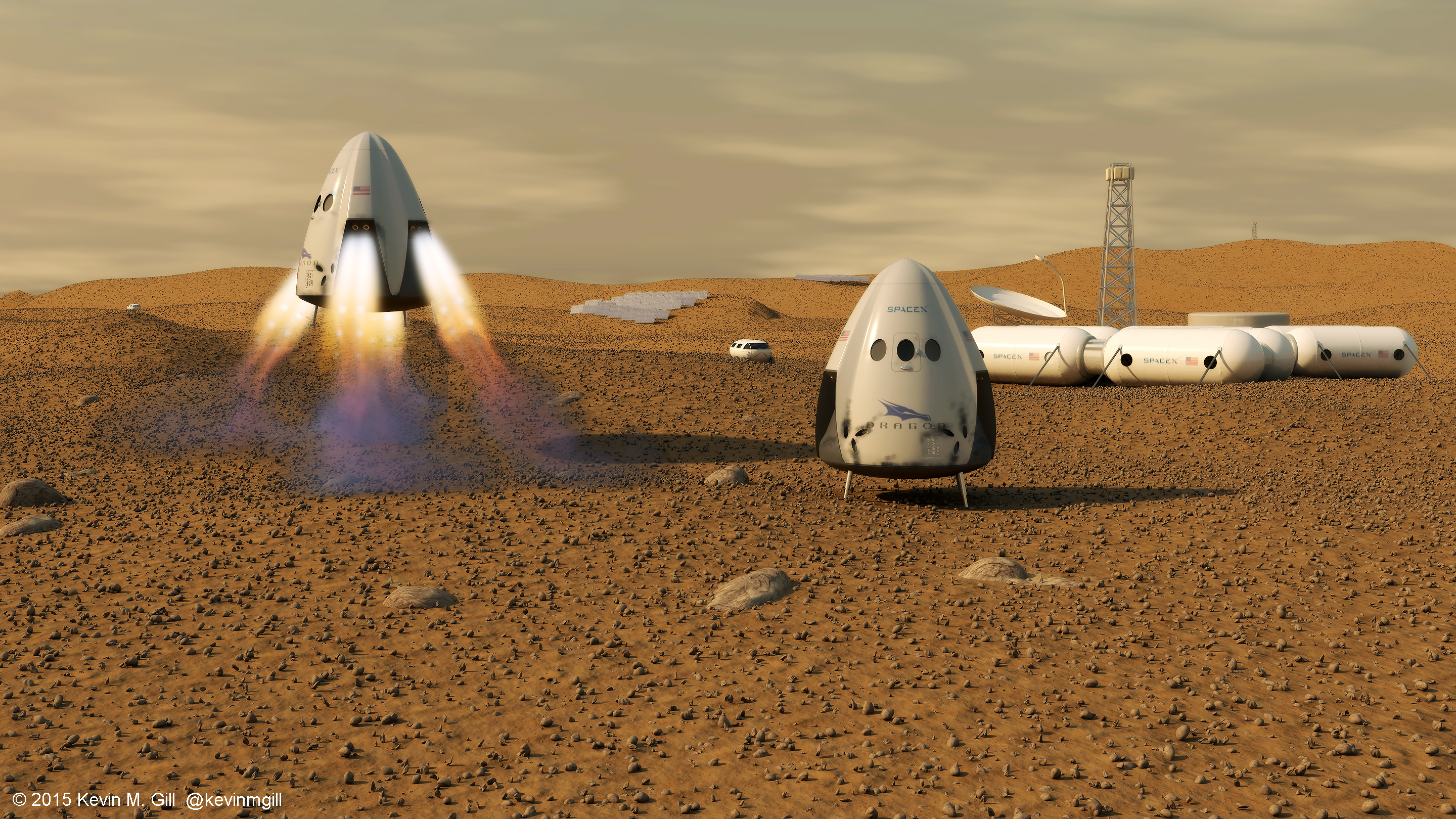
Self-portrait by Perseverance in September 2021 at Rochette, a rock and the site of the first core samples of the Mars 2020 mission.; Zhurong selfie with lander, taken by the deployable Tianwen-1 remote camera.; Mars Orbiter Mission spacecraft around Mars; Artist's conception of two SpaceX Red Dragon capsules on Mars, next to an outpost

The Mars race, race to Mars or race for Mars is the competitive environment between various national space agencies, "New Space" and aerospace manufacturers involving crewed missions to Mars, land on Mars, or set a crewed base there. Some of these efforts are part of a greater Mars colonization vision, while others are for glory (being first), or scientific endeavours. Some of this competitiveness is part of the New Space Race.

== Rivalries ==
=== United States ===
==== Government Agency ====
===== NASA =====
The race to Mars involves competition between manufacturers and nations. NASA has demurred in a potential rivalry with SpaceX or other manufacturers in any possible race to be first to Mars. It instead sees synergies in possible cooperation with such entities. However, politicians may push NASA into competition with private entities such as Boeing and SpaceX in getting humans to Mars. President Donald Trump has planned for NASA to reach Mars in the 2030s.

==== Private companies ====
===== Boeing =====
Boeing has stated that one of its rockets will lead to the first crewed expedition to Mars, before SpaceX or others will land a crewed mission. Boeing is the primary contractor on the U.S. Space Launch System (SLS) NASA rocket program that has the ultimate goal of a crewed Mars mission. SpaceX has declined to state that it is a race, or that it needs to race Boeing.

===== SpaceX =====
In 2019, SpaceX started to develop their own hardware, the Starship with initial launches planned for the early 2020s, followed by a cargo mission to Mars planned for 2027 and a crewed Mars mission in 2029 with the goal of setting up a propellant depot and the beginnings of a Mars base.

===== Blue Origin =====
Blue Origin has stated that with its New Armstrong and New Glenn rockets, it may be attempting missions to Mars, head-to-head with the SpaceX Starship. This may result in commercial competition going to Mars.

===== Virgin Galactic =====
Virgin Galactic has expressed interest in future service to/on Mars.

===== Inspiration Mars =====
Inspiration Mars planned a crewed flyby of Mars using third party hardware but has been inactive since 2015.

=== China ===
It is widely thought that NASA and the China National Space Administration (CNSA) are in a tacit race to put humans on Mars. China is projected to have a crewed follow-up to 2020s robotic exploration project sometime after that; while NASA has a timeline of getting there in the 2030s.

=== India ===
The Mars Orbiter Mission (MOM), also known as Mangalyaan, is a space probe launched by the Indian Space Research Organisation (ISRO) on 5 November 2013 that entered Mars orbit on 24 September 2014. It was India’s first interplanetary mission and made ISRO the fourth space agency to reach Mars orbit, after the Soviet space program, NASA, and the European Space Agency. The mission demonstrated India’s ability to conduct complex deep-space missions at a relatively low cost, as it was developed primarily as a technology demonstrator rather than part of a competitive space race, and it made India the first Asian nation to reach Mars orbit on its first attempt with a comparatively modest budget. Within 2031-32, through the Mars Lander Mission, ISRO will send a lander, rover and helicopter, making India a major player in this new space race.

=== Russia ===
Russia has a long history of attempting missions to Mars, starting in the 1960s during the space race. The Soviet program launched several probes such as Mars 2 and Mars 3 in 1971; Mars 3 became the first spacecraft to land on Mars, though it transmitted data for only about 20 seconds. Later missions, including Phobos-Grunt in 2011, aimed to study Mars’ moon Phobos but failed to leave Earth orbit. Despite setbacks, Russia continues to plan future Mars exploration missions.

=== Europe ===
The European Space Agency studies Mars through missions like the ExoMars Programme. It launched the ExoMars Trace Gas Orbiter in 2016 to analyze gases in the Martian atmosphere, especially methane. Although the lander crashed, engineering data on the first five minutes of entry was successfully retrieved.

=== United Arab Emirates ===
The United Arab Emirates sent its first mission to Mars with the Emirates Mars Mission. Its spacecraft, the Hope Probe, entered Mars’ orbit in 2021.

== Moon as stepping stone ==
In the 2020s, both the US and China are engaged in an effort to establish a permanent presence on the Moon, with an emphasis on the Lunar south pole, as a proving ground and stepping stone to Mars. The US uses its Artemis program and China uses its Chinese Lunar Exploration Program.

In this regard, India has already made significant progress with missions such as Chandrayaan-3, which successfully landed near the lunar south polar region on 23 August 2023, making it one of the few nations to achieve a soft landing on the Moon and the first to land near the lunar south pole.

== See also ==
- Space Race
- Moon landing
- Exploration of Mars
- List of missions to Mars
- SpaceX Mars Colonization Program
