= Space Race (Mi-Sex song) =

- Australian art work

Single by Mi-Sex

from the album Space Race
- B-side: "Living in September"
- Released: June 1980
- Recorded: January–February 1980
- Studio: Music Farm Studios, Byron Bay, Australia
- Genre: Synth-pop, electronic, new wave
- Length: 3:44
- Label: CBS
- Songwriter(s): Murray Burns, Kevin Stanton
- Producer(s): Peter Dawkins

Mi-Sex singles chronology
"People" (1980)	"Space Race" (1980)	"It Only Hurts When I'm Laughing" (1980)

"Space Race" is a song by New Zealand group Mi-Sex, released in June 1980 as the second single from their second studio album, Space Race (1980). The song peaked at number 19 in New Zealand and 28 in Australia.

== Track listings ==
Australia/New Zealand 7" (BA 222672)

1. "Space Race" - 3:44
2. "Living in September" - 2:41

== Charts ==
Chart (1980)	Peak position
Australian Kent Music Report	28
New Zealand (Recorded Music NZ)	19
