= Space Race (album) =

Studio album by Mi-Sex
- Released: May 1980
- Studio: Studios 301, Music Farms Studios, Sydney
- Genre: New wave
- Length: 37:23
- Label: CBS
- Producer: Peter Dawkins

Mi-Sex chronology
| Graffiti Crimes (1979) | Space Race (1980) | Shanghaied! (1981) |

Singles from Space Race
- 1. "People" Released: March 1980; 2. "Space Race" Released: June 1980; 3. "It Only Hurts When I'm Laughing" Released: August 1980

Professional ratings
Review scores
| Source | Rating |
|---|---|
| AllMusic | 3/5 stars |

Space Race is the second studio album by New Zealand New Wave music group Mi-Sex, released in May 1980.The album peaked at number one on the New Zealand albums chart and was certified platinum.

The record label launched a promotional campaign with the slogan 'Are you a clone? . . . No, I'm in the Space Race'. Little rubber alien mannequins as featured on the front cover popped up all over the place." Ed Nimmervoll of Howlspace website felt that the album was "talking about overpopulation, environmental issues, genetic engineering and other issues of great importance for the future."

== Track listing ==
Vinyl/cassette (237442) Side one
| No. | Title | Writer(s) | Length |
|---|---|---|---|
| 1. | "Space Race" | Kevin Stanton, Murray Burns | 3:44 |
| 2. | "Pages and Matches" | Stanton, Burns | 2:30 |
| 3. | "Living in September" | Stanton | 2:41 |
| 4. | "I Don't Know" | Stanton, Burns | 2:27 |
| 5. | "Slippin' Out" | Stanton, Gilpin | 3:08 |
| 6. | "It Only Hurts When I'm Laughing" | Stanton, Burns, Steve Gilpin | 4:18 |

Side two
| No. | Title | Writer(s) | Length |
|---|---|---|---|
| 1. | "People" | Stanton, Burns, Gilpin | 3:49 |
| 2. | "Good Guys Always Win (Satire)" | Stanton, Burns | 3:17 |
| 3. | "Ghosts" | Stanton, Burns | 3:42 |
| 4. | "Burning Up" | Stanton, Burns, Gilpin, Richard Hodgkinson | 3:35 |
| 5. | "Ice Cold Dead" | Stanton, Burns | 4:16 |

== Charts ==
=== Weekly charts ===
| Chart (1980) | Peak position |
|---|---|
| Australian Kent Music Report | 5 |
| New Zealand Albums (RMNZ) | 1 |

=== Year-end charts ===
| Chart (1980) | Peak position |
|---|---|
| New Zealand | 9 |

== Certifications ==
| Region | Certification | Certified units/sales |
|---|---|---|
| Australia (ARIA) | Platinum | 50,000^{^} |
^{^} Shipments figures based on certification alone.
