= Mi-Sex =

New Zealand new wave band

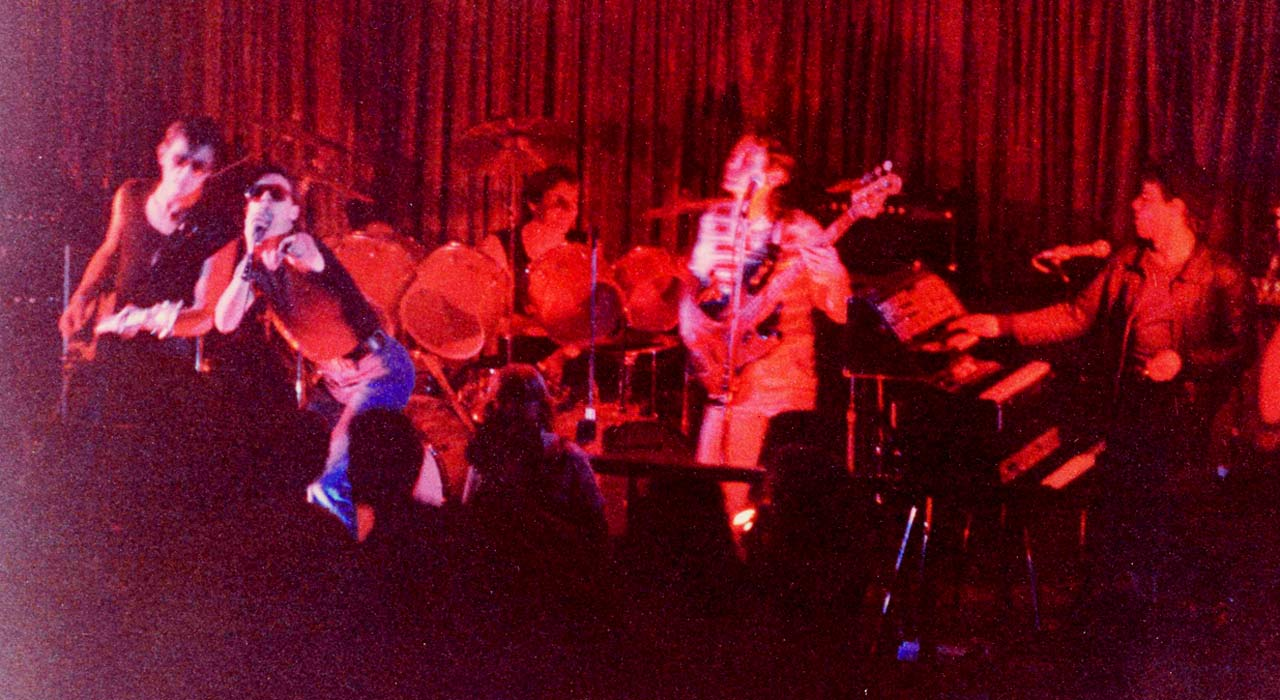
- Mi-Sex at the Lady Hamilton Nightclub in 1978

Background information
- Origin: Wellington, New Zealand
- Genre: New wave
- Years active: 1978–1986, 2011, 2014–present
- Label: Columbia
- Members: Murray Burns; James Van Cooper; Steve Balbi; Jordan McDonald; Bobby Poulton
- Past members: Steve Gilpin (deceased); Kevin Stanton (deceased); Phil Smart; Steve Osborne; Richard Hodgkinson; Paul Dunningham; Colin Bayley; Don Martin (deceased); Travis New

Mi-Sex (also styled as MiSex) is a New Zealand new wave band originally active from 1978 to 1986, and led for much of its existence by Steve Gilpin as vocalist, Kevin Stanton as guitarist and songwriter, Murray Burns as keyboardist and songwriter, and Don Martin as bassist. The group's manager for much of its career was Bob Yates. Mi-Sex achieved two top 10 hit singles in 1979-80: "Computer Games" in October 1979 (No. 1 in Australia, No. 5 in New Zealand) and "People" in 1980 (No. 6 and No. 3, respectively). Their first two albums both reached the New Zealand top 10, Graffiti Crimes (July 1979) and Space Race (No. 1, June 1980). They were known for their cutting edge production and dynamic live shows. Gilpin died in January 1992, two months after a serious car accident from which he never recovered. Mi-Sex have periodically reformed, including in 2011 with Steve Balbi (ex-Noiseworks) on lead vocals. Stanton died on 17 May 2017, Martin on 10 August 2020.

== History ==
=== 1978: Formation and "Straight Laddie" ===
Mi-Sex was formed in 1978 in New Zealand when Murray Burns on keyboards, Steve Gilpin on lead vocals, Don Martin on bass guitar and Kevin Stanton on lead guitar and backing vocals (all ex-Fragments of Time) and were joined by Richard Hodgkinson on drums. The band name is adapted from an Ultravox track, "My Sex", from that group's debut album, Ultravox! (February 1977).

Gilpin had earlier performed as a solo artist in New Zealand, following his winning a TV talent quest, New Faces, in 1972 (second place in the same show was Shona Laing). Invercargill-born Burns was influenced by progressive rock bands such as Yes, whereas Stanton's influences veered towards heavy metal. During 1977 Gilpin met Martin and they set about forming their own band; Martin brought Stanton on board and together with former Father Time members Alan Moon and Phil "Smarty" Smart, they formed Fragments of Time.

Fragments of Time were influenced by British new wave and pub rock bands; they received a commission from EMI New Zealand's Peter Dawkins, who wanted a punk-new wave record to introduce the label's new roster. Their line-up changed, with Moon replaced by Burns and Smart leaving, replaced briefly by Steve Osborne and then by Hodgkinson. Fragments of Time developed a quirky, futurist, paranoia-themed blend of new wave, punk, and pub rock, amalgamating some of the textures common to Britain's Ultravox with those more associated with The Stranglers. They blended this with a liberal dose of on stage theatrics. At around the same time, they changed their name – urgently needed for their demo. In a meeting in a room at the back of the Aranui hotel which they were playing in, they accepted the name Stanton had proposed.

Mi-Sex released their first single for EMI New Zealand, "Straight Laddie" (originally intended as a demo), early in 1978. Early performances include the Wellington Institute of Technology and Dr Johns (Ray Johns), on the same day with demo recording at Dellbrook studios in Tawa, and the bus breaking a gearbox on the Ngauranga Gorge section of motorway.

=== 1979–1980: Graffiti Crimes, Space Race and "Computer Games" ===
In August 1978 the band relocated to Sydney, where they became the city's "fourth biggest drawcard" within six months. They were signed to the Australian division of CBS Records by the label's A&R manager and house producer, Dawkins, who had produced "Straight Laddie". Their first single for CBS, "But You Don't Care", was released in Australia in May 1979, which peaked at No. 25 on the local Kent Music Report Singles Chart and No. 33 on their native Official New Zealand Music Chart.

Their debut album, Graffiti Crimes was issued in July 1979 to coincide with their national tour supporting Talking Heads. They also headlined their own tour of Australia. It reached No. 6 in New Zealand and the top 20 in Australia. It was also produced by Dawkins at Studios 301, during April and May 1979.

Added to later versions of the LP is their biggest hit, the synthesiser-driven single, "Computer Games", which was co-written by Burns, Gilpin and Stanton. It was released in Australia on 1 October 1979. Dawkins had first heard the track at the album launch, in July, he asked Stanton, "'Why didn't you play me "Computer Games" when we were doing the demos for the album?'. Kevin answered in the most succinct way possible, 'Because I hadn't written it yet!" The single went to No. 1 in Australia, made the top 5 in New Zealand; and reached the top 10 in Austria, Canada, France, Italy, South Africa and West Germany.

In October 1979 Mi-Sex supported Cheap Trick, The Canberra Times' Jonathon Green caught their gig at Bruce Stadium, "The New Zealanders played one of the best sets I have ever heard from them. It was crystal clear and as tight as could be in a live performance... [They] managed to deliver an uncluttered sound which throbbed with energy and power." In the following month they appeared at the Concert of the Decade at the Sydney Opera House – an edited hour of concert footage was broadcast by the Nine Network under the same name and a double-LP was issued on Mushroom Records later that month.

In January 1980, the band began recording their second album. In April and May 1980 they toured the United States and Canada for five weeks. Space Race was released in May 1980. In New Zealand it peaked at No. 1 and in Australia it reached No. 6. Space Race provided another top 10 single, "People", which reached No. 3 in New Zealand and No. 6 in Australia. The title track was the next single and peaked in the top 20 in New Zealand and top 30 in Australia. Although Mi-Sex toured Australia and New Zealand through 1981 – performing 366 gigs in that year – the group "found its popularity in slow decline."

Burns told The Australian Women's Weekly's Susan Moore that "When we arrived new wave was very full-on and we had pretty much a street image. Then when we did Space Race, which we felt was an extension of what we were doing, I guess some people didn't like the idea of a concept album ... we copped a lot of flack."

=== 1981–1985: Shanghaied! and Where Do They Go? ===
Their third album, Shanghaied! (October 1981), was co-produced by the band's members, mostly by Burns and Stanton, together with John L Sayers and Dave Marett. McFarlane described it as "arguably the band's best album... [which] failed to impress the record-buying public." Moore declared it "should bring the band back on an even keel. It's more down to earth and heart-felt." In October 1981 Hodgkinson was replaced on drums by Paul Dunningham (ex-Coup D'État).

Late in 1982 Stanton temporarily left the band due to ill-health, he was replaced on guitar by Ted Yanni. After four months, Stanton returned and Yanni remained until he was replaced in turn by Colin Bayley (ex-Silent Movies) on guitar. The group continued as a six-piece. For their fourth album, Where Do They Go? (November 1983), they worked with US producer, Bob Clearmountain. Nimmervoll described the group as "searching for more low key lyrical subjects and simpler music." Three singles were released from the album including "Blue Day" which peaked within the top 40 in New Zealand and Australia in 1984. A greatest hits album was released in 1985, titled '79-'85.

=== 1986–2010: Hiatus ===
Mi-Sex took a hiatus from February 1986; Stanton moved to London in April to work with Fairlight and produce feature film sound tracks. Gilpin remained in Australia, working with his cover band Under Rapz. In November 1991, while returning to his home after a gig, he was seriously injured in a major car accident, and lapsed into a coma from which he never recovered. He died in Southport Hospital on 6 January 1992. Two large benefit concerts were held in February 1992 for Steve's family. His partner Margaret and their children Sarah and Nick. One concert at Sydney's 'Hordern Pavilion' and one at Melbourne's 'Palais Theatre'. Many well known Australian and New Zealand artists performed. Jon Stevens, Marc Hunter, Mark Williams, Daryl Braithwaite, Alex Smith and Angry Anderson each sang with the remaining Mi-Sex members. Don Martin, Murray Burns, Kevin Stanton, Colin Bayley and Paul Dunningham.

Ed Nimmervoll wrote in 2001: "Murray now lives outside of Byron Bay and continues with Twilight Productions and other projects in Sydney, Don is still financial controller for Bob and Pete's in Sydney, Kevin lives in Brisbane and runs his own company, Speaking Image Productions, a record label and video, film, multimedia and internet production consortium also does some acting... and drummer, Paul, lives in New Zealand." 'Bob and Pete's' was a croissant business cofounded by Yates, though he was no longer associated with the organisation by this time.

In 2008, Yates was prosecuted for sexual acts with a 15-year-old girl in Ringwood, Victoria.

=== 2011–present: Reformation & Not from Here ===
The band reunited for a fund-raising concert following the 2011 Christchurch earthquake, with former Noiseworks bass player Steve Balbi on lead vocals. As of 2014 they were back in the studio working on new songs, 33 years since their last release. Stanton had been forced to sit out, having recently undergone serious surgery on his spine which rendered his entire left arm useless, but repairable with intricate neurosurgery.

In February 2016, Mi-Sex announced the release of their first single in 33 years, titled "Somebody", followed by an Extended play featuring "Somebody" and three re-recorded tracks. "My Sex Your Sex", was released on 3 June 2016. Their first album since 1983's Where Do They Go?, titled Not from Here, was released on 9 September 2016. The album peaked at number 93 on the ARIA Charts.

Don Martin battled cancer for some years, holding a 'living wake' in January 2020, and dying on 10 August of that year.

== The "Culture" controversy ==
Mi-Sex gained publicity during 1980 due to then-Prime Minister of New Zealand, Rob Muldoon. His government had imposed a 40% sales duty on records, much to the objection of the New Zealand Arts Council, record retailers and record companies. On 21 April, Muldoon claimed that popular music was "not culture", stating that "The records sold in this country are not Kiri Te Kanawa's, they are 50 to 1 those horrible pop groups and I'm not going to take the tax off them."

Mi-Sex were due to start a major New Zealand tour five weeks later, and – sensing an opportunity for publicity – Kevin Stanton invited Muldoon to attend their Wellington concert during a radio interview in Hamilton, an invitation which Muldoon was urged to accept when quizzed by the opposition in parliament. The Prime Minister attended the concert along with his daughter (who reportedly loved the concert) and met with the band after their performance, but the sales tax remained. Muldoon was pleasant but Burns recalled seeing a newspaper article the next day in which he was quoted as saying that it was about as cultural as On the Mat, which was a wrestling show of the time.

== Members ==
=== Current ===
- Murray Burns – keyboards, backing vocals (1978–1985, 1992, 2011, 2014–present)
- Steve Balbi – lead vocals (2011, 2014–present)
- Travis New – bass (2020-present), guitar (2011, 2014–2020), backing vocals (2011, 2014, 2025)
- Jordan McDonald – drums (2018–present)
- Bobby Poulton - bass, backing vocals (2025- present)
- James Van Cooper – guitar, backing vocals (2020–present)

=== Former ===
- Steve Gilpin – lead vocals (1978-1985; died 1992)
- Don Martin – bass, backing vocals (1978–1985, 1992, 2011-2020; his death)
- Alan Moon – keyboards (1978)
- Phil Smart – drums (1978)
- Kevin Stanton – guitar, backing vocals (1978–1982, 1983–1985, 1992; died 2017)
- Richard Hodgkinson – drums (1978-1981)
- Ted Yanni – guitar (1982–1983)
- Colin Bayley – guitar (1983–1985, 1992, 2011-2019)
- Paul Dunningham – drums (1981–1985, 1992, 2011–2018)

== Awards and nominations ==
=== TV Week / Countdown Awards ===
Countdown was an Australian pop music TV series on national broadcaster ABC-TV from 1974 to 1987, it presented music awards from 1979 to 1987, initially in conjunction with magazine TV Week. The TV Week / Countdown Awards were a combination of popular-voted and peer-voted awards. At the 1979 awards, in April 1980, Mi-Sex received six nominations and won four. As the group were then touring the US and Canada, Dawkins collected the awards on the band's behalf.

Year	Nominee / work	Award	Result
1979	Graffiti Crimes	Best Australian Album	Nominated
1979	Peter Dawkins for Graffiti Crimes by Mi-Sex	Best Australian Producer	Won
1979	"Computer Games"	Best Australian Single	Won
1979	"Computer Games"	Most Popular Single	Won
1979	Themselves	Best New Talent	Won
1979	Themselves	Most Popular Group	Nominated

== Discography ==
=== Studio albums ===
List of albums, with selected chart positions and certifications
Title	Album details	Peak chart positions		Certifications
Title	Album details	NZ	AUS	Certifications
Graffiti Crimes	Released: July 1979; Label: CBS (237329)	6	16	NZ: Gold; AUS: Platinum
Space Race	Released: May 1980; Label: CBS (237442)	1	5	NZ: Platinum; AUS: Platinum
Shanghaied!	Released October 1981; Label: CBS (237701)	—	28	
Where Do They Go?	Released November 1983; Label: CBS (237954)	—	80	
Not from Here	Released 9 September 2016; Label: Golden Robot (GOLDRR008)	—	93	

=== Compilation albums ===
List of albums, with selected chart positions and certifications
Title	Album details	Peak chart positions
Title	Album details	AUS
'79-'85	Released: October 1985; Label: CBS (462550)	46
The Essential Mi-Sex	Released: 7 April 2007; Label: Sony BMG (88697069632)	—

=== Extended plays ===
Title	EP details
Extended Play	Released: 19 February 2016; Label: Golden Robot (GOLDRR002)

=== Singles ===
Year	Title	Peak chart positions					Album
Year	Title	NZ	AUS	AUT	NL	US Dance	Album
1978	"Straight Laddie"	—	—	—	—	—	Non-album single
1979	"But You Don't Care"	33	20	—	—	—	Graffiti Crimes
1979	"Computer Games"	5	1	16	44	61	Graffiti Crimes
1980	"People"	3	6	—	—	—	Space Race
1980	"Space Race"	19	28	—	—	—	Space Race
1980	"It Only Hurts When I'm Laughing"	—	84	—	—	—	Space Race
1981	"Falling In and Out"	48	20	—	—	—	Shanghaied
1981	"Missing Person"	—	—	—	—	—	Shanghaied
1981	"Shanghaied!"	—	—	—	—	—	Shanghaied
1982	"Castaway"	—	23	—	—	—	Non-album singles
1982	"Down the Line (Makin' Love on the Telephone)"	—	37	—	—	—	Non-album singles
1982	"Lost Time"	—	57	—	—	—	Non-album singles
1983	"Only Thinking"	—	48	—	—	—	Where Do They Go?
1984	"Blue Day"	36	24	—	—	—	Where Do They Go?
1984	"5 O'Clock (In the Morning)"	—	—	—	—	—	Where Do They Go?
2016	"Somebody"	—	—	—	—	—	Extended Play
2016	"My Sex Your Sex"	—	—	—	—	—	Not from Here
"—" denotes a recording that did not chart or was not released in that territory.
