= Steve Gilpin =

New Zealand singer-songwriter (1949–1992)

- Birth name: Stephen Ellis Gilpin
- Born: 28 April 1949; Wellington, New Zealand
- Died: 6 January 1992 (aged 42); Southport, Queensland, Australia
- Genres: Progressive rock, new wave
- Occupation: Musician
- Instrument: Vocals
- Years active: 1972–1991
- Labels: Strange, His Master's Voice
- Formerly of: Father Thyme, Fragments of Time, Mi-Sex, Under Rapz

Stephen Ellis Gilpin (28 April 1949 – 6 January 1992) was a New Zealand singer and a founder of new wave band Mi-Sex.

In November 1972, he won the national final of TV talent show, New Faces. In 1977 he was a founder of Mi-Sex, which became one of the most popular new wave bands in New Zealand and Australia in the late 1970s to early 1980s. They relocated to Australia in August 1978 and reached number one on the Australian Kent Music Report Singles Chart with "Computer Games" (1979) and had top five hits with "Computer Games" and "People" on the New Zealand Singles Chart. Gilpin also had a solo career including releasing material before forming Mi-Sex. He joined various groups after their disbandment and performed as a solo artist. He was severely injured in a car accident in November 1991 and died of his injuries on 6 January 1992, aged 42.

== Biography ==
Stephen Ellis Gilpin was born on 28 April 1949 in Wellington, New Zealand. He began his music career as a cabaret singer in hotels. In 1972 he issued two singles, "Spring" and "Stoned Me", on Strange Records, and another single, "Anna, No Can Do", on His Master's Voice. In November that year he was the winner of New Zealand TV talent show, New Faces, ahead of Shona Laing. He followed with a string of singles until his focus shifted from cabaret to rock music. In 1976 Gilpin met with progressive rock band Father Thyme and suggested that they work together.

In 1977 Gilpin formed Fragments of Time with Don Martin on bass guitar and Alan Moon on keyboards (both ex-members of Father Thyme). Moon soon left and was replaced on keyboards by Murray Burns (ex-Red Rose), Kevin Stanton joined on guitar; and Phil Start on drums. Start was replaced by Steve Osborne on drums. Mi-Sex was formed by Gilpin, Burns, Martin and Stanton, after Osborne was replaced by Richard Hodgkinson. They started playing new wave and Stanton adapted the band name, Mi-Sex, from a track, "My Sex", by United Kingdom band, Ultravox from their 1977 album, Ultravox!.

Mi-Sex' debut single, "Straight Laddie" appeared in 1978, which was co-written by Gilpin and Stanton and was produced by the group. The band decided they would try the Australian touring circuit and arrived in August that year. Within six months they had become the fourth most popular band in Sydney. The Canberra Times described their popularity in March 1979 "one of Sydney's major acts ... they played in the [university] Union ... on a very successful night ... [they] will leave to tour New Zealand on March 19". Mi-Sex received support from Australian Broadcasting Corporation's Sydney 'youth' radio station Double Jay and its nationally televised pop show, Countdown. They issued their debut album, Graffiti Crimes, in July on CBS Records and supported Talking Heads on the Australian leg of their tour.

In Australia Mi-Sex achieved their highest chart peak in October 1979 with a number-one hit single, "Computer Games", on the Kent Music Report. The track was co-written by Gilpin, Burns and Stanton. In their homeland it reached No. 5 on the New Zealand Singles Chart. Australian musicologist, Ian McFarlane, described it as an "electro-pop anthem ... [w]ith its simplistic, brain-teasing riff and Gilpin's mannered vocal yelps, [it] boasted little substance but was constructed for maximum effect". Mi-Sex performed at the Sydney Opera House with various artists in the Concert of the Decade on 4 November 1979. The group won the 1979 TV Week – Countdown Music Awards for 'Most Popular Album or Single', 'Best Australian Single' and 'Best New Talent' at the ceremony held in April the following year.

The next year they recorded their follow-up album Space Race, which reached No. 1 on the New Zealand Albums Chart. They completed a six-week tour of the United States. Their next single, "People" reached No. 3 in New Zealand – their highest local hit single – and No. 6 in Australia. However, during the early-1980s their popularity waned and the group effectively split in 1985. Gilpin remained in Australia and played with a variety of bands including Rapid Fire in 1985 with Allan Carr, Phil Emmanuel on guitar, and Chris Haigh. He joined as guest vocalist with The Incredible Penguins in 1985, for a cover of "Happy Xmas (War Is Over)", a charity project for research on fairy penguins, which peaked at No. 10 on the Australian Kent Music Report in December. Mi-Sex released a Greatest Hits collection in 1988.

Gilpin also performed with a covers band Under Rapz. He lived on a rural property near Mullumbimby in northern New South Wales.

== Death ==
On 25 November 1991, while driving home from an Under Rapz gig at nearby Byron Bay, Gilpin was involved in a car accident. He sustained serious head injuries that left him in a coma. He never recovered consciousness and died in Southport Hospital on 6 January 1992, aged 42. He was buried on his property. Two benefit concerts were held in February for his wife Maggie, and their two children.
