= Indelible Murtceps =

Australian rock band (1971–1973)

The Indelible Murtceps
- Also known as: Murtceps
- Origin: Melbourne, Victoria, Australia
- Genres: Progressive rock, rock and roll, pub rock
- Years active: 1971–1973
- Label: EMI
- Past members: Ray Arnott; Lee Neale; Bill Putt; Mike Rudd; John Mills
- Website: mikeruddbillputt.com

The Indelible Murtceps were an Australian progressive rock and dance-pop band, which formed, as a side project of Spectrum, in October 1971. Sometimes referred to as the shortened name, Murtceps, they were "a stripped-back version... [that] could play anywhere and often." They worked the more lucrative dance and pub rock circuit. Whereas Spectrum performed in a full concert setting, commonly at larger venues, like the T.F. Much Ballroom, and at rock festivals.

The Indelible Murtceps' debut single, "Esmeralda", was issued in 1972, which peaked in the Go-Set National Top 40. It appeared ahead of their studio album, Warts Up Your Nose(1973), in the following year, which made the top 20. Sometimes both groups shared a stage; both disbanded after a joint final gig at the Dallas Brooks Hall on 15 April 1973. The performance was included on a shared live double album, Terminal Buzz (1973), which appeared in December that year.

== History ==
The Indelible Murtceps were formed in Melbourne in October 1971 by Mike Rudd as a side project for his main group, Spectrum, using the same roster for both bands. The line-up was Mike Rudd on lead guitar, lead vocals and harmonica, Lee Neale on keyboards, Bill Putt on bass guitar and Ray Arnott on drums. With the advent of pub rock Spectrum's lengthy and complex material was precluding bookings on the lucrative local dance and pub circuit. Spectrum were performing in a full concert setting, using a large PA system and light show, sometimes augmented by a dance, performance troupe, The Tribe. They commonly appeared at larger venues, like the T.F. Much Ballroom, and at rock festivals.

Rudd created a performance set of simpler, dance-pop tunes, with a reduced stage set-up, for use by Indelible Murtceps, allowing Spectrum to continue its progressive course while supplementing members' incomes with the more frequent Murtceps gigs. The name 'murtceps' is 'spectrum' written backwards. According to music journalist, Ed Nimmervoll, the Murtceps were "a stripped-back version... [that] could play anywhere and often." Susan Moore of The Australian Women's Weekly recalled that Spectrum's "music was often regarded as 'progressive' and more for listening purposes, which didn't please dance audiences too much. So the band developed an alter ego which they called the Indelible Murtceps, who turned up when a dance band was required."

In January 1972 they appeared at the inaugural Sunbury Pop Festival, with Spectrum providing a separate set. Three live tracks by the Indelible Murtceps, "We are Indelible", "Be My Honey" and "But that's Alright", were issued on a various artists live album of the concert, Sunbury. They were one of three bands featured on a short film, Australian Colour Diary, No.43: 3 Directions in Australian (1972), directed by Peter Weir, which provided "a sample of three trends in recent Australian pop music".

During 1972 Murtceps recorded their debut album, Warts Up Your Nose, at Armstrong's Studios with Howard Gable as producer; it was released on 20 January 1973. Most tracks have satirical, scatological and sexual themes. According to Duncan Kimball of Milesago website the centrepiece is Rudd's epic 13-minute ode to marijuana, "Some Good Advice". The album was packaged in a brown cardboard cover, intended to evoke the "plain brown wrapper" traditionally associated with pornographic publications. By May 1972 they had released their debut single, "Esmeralda", which (like the song "Rene" by The Small Faces) was a light hearted ode to a prostitute. The single version was different from the album version. It peaked at No. 36 on the Go-Set National Top 40.

In September 1972 keyboardist Lee Neale had a nervous breakdown and left, he was replaced by John Mills on keyboards. Neale left the music industry. The Indelible Murtceps released a second single, "Indelible Shuffle", from the album in June. Ahead of the single, in March 1973, drummer Ray Arnott announced he was leaving both groups and Rudd decided they would play their final gig at the Dallas Brooks Hall on 15 April 1973. The performance appeared on the double live album, Terminal Buzz (December 1973), which was credited to both Indelible Murtceps and Spectrum. Rudd, Mills and Putt co-founded a new group, Ariel; while Arnott joined Mighty Kong.

== Discography ==
=== Albums ===
List of albums, with Australian chart positions
Title	Album details	Peak chart positions
Title	Album details	AUS
Warts Up Your Nose	Released: 1973; Format: LP; Label: His Master's Voice (OCSD 7697)	24
Testimonial (with Spectrum)	Released: July 1973; Format: LP; Label: EMI (EMC-2503)	17
Terminal Buzz	Released: December 1973; Format: LP; Label: His Master's Voice (SOELP10081/2); Note: Live albums, recorded live in at the Dallas Brooks Hall on 15 April 1973.	-

=== Singles ===
List of singles, with selected chart positions
Year	Title	Peak chart positions
Year	Title	AUS
1972	"Esmeralda" / "We Are Indelible"	37
1973	"Indelible Shuffle" / "Ray's Boogie"	58
