= Greg Quill =

Australian musician (1947–2013)

- Born: Gregory Raymond Quill; 18 April 1947; Sydney, Australia
- Died: 5 May 2013 (aged 66); Hamilton, Ontario, Canada
- Occupations: Journalist, singer-songwriter, musician
- Spouse: Ellen Davidson
- Writing career
- Genre: Entertainment
- Notable work: Toronto Star
- Website: www.gregquill.com

Gregory Raymond Quill (18 April 1947 – 5 May 2013) was an Australian-born musician, singer-songwriter and journalist. He lived in Hamilton, Ontario, Canada, and was an entertainment columnist at the Toronto Star newspaper from the mid-1980s until his death in May 2013. In Australia he came to popular fame as a singer-songwriter for the country rock band Country Radio (1970–73). Their biggest hit, "Gypsy Queen", co-written by Quill with bandmate Kerryn Tolhurst, was released in August 1972 and peaked at No. 12 on the Go-Set National Top 40. After getting an arts grant, Quill travelled to Toronto in 1974 and by the mid-1980s had become a journalist with the Toronto Star. By 1983 he was married to Ellen Davidson, a public relations executive. Greg Quill died on 5 May 2013, at the age of 66, from "complications due to pneumonia".

== Biography ==
=== Early life ===
Gregory Raymond Quill was born on 18 April 1947 to Raymond and Doris Quill (née Markham). He grew up in Sydney with a younger brother, Christopher. From the age of about 15 years he learned how to play acoustic guitar and his first public performance was in his final year of high school. Quill began his musical career in the 1960s as a solo performer on the Sydney folk scene clustered around the University of Sydney, where he graduated in 1970 with a Bachelor of Arts in English Language and Literature. He worked briefly as a history teacher at a Catholic boys high school in Bankstown. He was hired by David Elfick, then the local editor of the national weekly pop music magazine, Go-Set (later Elfick was a movie producer). Quill worked as a writer from 1969, then feature writer (February 1970 to August 1971) and Sydney regional editor (July 1970 to August 1971) for the Melbourne-based publication. In 2002 Quill recalled that editing Go-Set had prepared him for his later work in journalism.

=== Early musical career ===
From 1967, Greg Quill ran The Shack, a folk music venue at Narrabeen on Sydney's northern beaches, where he also performed. In 1999 he described the venue "[it] was a sort of folk co-operative, and everybody who performed on a particular evening got to share in the door takings – it was never more than a couple of bucks". In 1969 Quill handed over the running of the venue to his younger brother, Christopher. Gus McNeil, a music publisher, record producer and former singer and saxophonist for 1960s rock band, Gus & The Nomads, signed Quill to a publishing deal with his company, Cellar Music. McNeil produced Quill's first commercial recording, the single, "Fleetwood Plain", and the subsequent album of the same name. Quill wrote all the tracks on the album.

For the album Quill was backed by Orlando Agostino on guitars, Chris Blanchflower on harmonica, John Walsh on bass guitar, and members of local rock band Pirana: Jim Duke-Yonge on drums, Tony Hamilton on guitar, Graeme Thompson on bass guitar and Stan White on keyboards. Early in 1970 the album was released on EMI's new subsidiary label, Harvest Records, although the title single had been issued on EMI's Australian pop label Columbia Records. "Fleetwood Plain" was subsequently covered by Australian country musician, Reg Lindsay, and by Canadian folk-rockers Creamcheeze Good Time Band on their 1973 album, Home Cookin'.

=== Country Radio band ===
To promote Fleetwood Plain Greg Quill formed the original line-up of Country Radio (also seen as Greg Quill's Country Radio or Greg Quill and Country Radio) in June 1970. Other members were Agostino, Blanchflower, Walsh and Dave Hannagan on percussion and backing vocals. The group started as an acoustic act but from 1970 to 1971 its musical style evolved into electric country rock, a style then gaining popularity through the influence of albums like The Band's Music from Big Pink (1968), The Byrds' Sweetheart of the Rodeo (1968), and Bob Dylan's Nashville Skyline (1969).

By May 1971, Country Radio's line-up had changed with Blanchflower and Quill joined by Mal Algar on bass guitar (ex-Chorus), John A. Bird on keyboards and Ace Follington on drums (ex-Chain). In October that year the group signed to Infinity Records, a new subsidiary of Festival Records and recorded their debut single, "Listen to the Children", which came out in November although it did not chart. Soon after, Follington left to join a pop band, The Cleves, for a tour of Britain; he was replaced on drums by Kim Bryant, who was in turn was replaced a few months later by Tony Bolton (ex-The Affair, Freshwater). In January 1972 Algar left and they were joined by John Du Bois (ex-Circle of Love, New Dream) on bass guitar and Kerryn Tolhurst on guitar, lap steel and mandolin (ex-Adderley Smith Blues Band, Sundown). The addition of Tolhurst was crucial to the band's sound and style, Quill and Tolhurst began a songwriting partnership.

With the "classic" line-up of Quill, Tolhurst, Bird, Bois, Bolton and Blanchflower, Country Radio recorded their second and most successful single, "Gypsy Queen", with producer John French, in Melbourne in April 1972. It was co-written by Quill and Tolhurst, and featured a string arrangement by session musician, Peter Jones (who later worked on Quill's solo album, The Outlaw's Reply). Released in August, the single spent 13 weeks in the Go-Set National Top 40 and peaked at No. 12. "Gypsy Queen" shared the APRA (Australasian Performing Right Association) Song of the Year award with Mississippi's "Kings of the World". It was featured on the soundtrack of director Rod Hardy's 2007 film, December Boys, starring Daniel Radcliffe, and in the 2009 ABC-TV series, East of Everything.

The chart success of the single and the interest of expatriate Canadian music promoter and label representative, Michael McMartin, led to a contract with Toronto-based MUCH Productions, which issued "Gypsy Queen" in Canada in 1972. At the end of that year they toured Canada to promote its release. The group's follow-up single, "Wintersong", appeared in December 1972 and made the Go-Set Top 40 in April, the next year. On 4 October 1972 the group had recorded a live-in-the-studio performance before an invited audience, which Infinity released as their debut album, Country Radio Live, in December. It included a selection of originals, plus two tracks, "Some Lonesome Picker" and "Never Goin' Back", written by John Stewart (ex-The Kingston Trio).

The band made several live TV recordings for the ABC-TV in-studio concert and interview series, GTK; including "Just Goodbye" (May 1971), "Last Time Around" (June), "Empty Pockets" (June), "Almost Freedom" (June), "Silver Spurs" (February 1972), "Commisar" (March), "Some Lonesome Picker" (April, May), "Listen to the Children" (October), "Fleetwood Plain" (November), "Gypsy Queen" (November), "Winter Song" (November), "I Need a Woman" and an interview on their break-up (April 1973). They appeared on concert and festival stages with different artists of the era, including Creedence Clearwater Revival, Elton John, Santana and Stephen Stills. They performed at the Rock Isle Mulwala Festival in 1972 and the Sunbury Pop Festivals in January 1972 and again the following year. Their live performance of "Silver Spurs" – written by Quill – at the latter festival, was included in Mushroom Records' triple live album, Sunbury 1973 – The Great Australian Rock Festival, released in April. Tolhurst abruptly left the band after the second Sunbury festival, briefly joining Mississippi, before forming The Dingoes in Melbourne, with singer-harmonicist, Broderick Smith. Soon after, both Bird and Blanchflower also left Country Radio.

we were playing this very gentle, acoustic, ringy mandolin music, with lots of romance in the lyrics ... it happened right at sundown, with a rather spectacular sunset [...] I remember, after a couple of songs, looking out and seeing 80,000 people standing up and screaming and waving and clapping. I thought the stage was on fire or something. I remember turning round to Kerryn and saying "What the hell's going on?" – but it was for us!

— Greg Quill in December 1999 on performing at Sunbury Pop Festival, January 1973, Broughton, John; "Interview – Greg Quill (Country Radio, Southern Cross)".

Quill, Bolton and Du Bois were joined by Adelaide guitarist-songwriter Russ Johnson (ex-Mississippi) – effectively swapping places with Tolhurst. In May 1973 that line-up recorded the group's fourth single, a country-rock restatement of the traditional song, "Bound for South Australia", which did not chart. The four-piece ensemble opened for British folk-rock band Fairport Convention on three dates of their 1973 tour, which despite promotions did not include former lead singer, Sandy Denny. Soon after, Johnson left Country Radio for medical reasons and returned to Adelaide.

Guitarists Les Stacpool and Russ Hinton (ex-Moonstone) alternated on lead guitar after Johnson's departure. Hinton also performed on Quill's subsequent solo LP. Du Bois left in August 1973, rejoining Tolhurst in The Dingoes. Country Radio had toured relentlessly during 1972 to 1973 and according to Australian musicologist, Ed Nimmervoll, they were "driven into the ground to the point where disintegration was inevitable". Quill dissolved the group in December 1973 and decided to return to his solo music career. He also worked for a year as general features writer and news reporter for The Sunday Telegraph, then as editor of the suburban weekly newspaper, The Peninsula News. In 1974, Quill, performing solo, opened for Fairport Convention in several Australian cities.

In the same year Quill recorded a solo studio album, The Outlaw's Reply, with the financial backing of Sydney-based executive producer and Trafalgar Studios owner Charles Fisher. It was produced by John L Sayers and featured Country Radio alumni: Blanchflower, Bolton, Du Bois, Hinton and Tolhurst, plus former collaborator Jones on keyboards. Also appearing on the album were Barry Leef on backing vocals, Chris Neal on synthesisers and Peter Walker on guitar. Two singles from the album were issued during 1975: "She Do It to Me" (April) and "Blackmail" / "The Outlaw's Reply" (September). The album included the Quill song "Almost Freedom", which had previously been covered by former Company Caine singer Gulliver Smith on his 1973 solo LP The Band's Alright But The Singer Is .... During 1974 Festival also released a compilation album, Gypsy Queen, credited to Greg Quill & Country Radio, contained selection of album tracks, and A- and B-sides of singles. It included Quill's cover of the country classic "Singin' the Blues", which featured Renee Geyer on backing vocals and Stacpool on guitar. In May 1975 Quill promoted the release of The Outlaw's Reply by a performance at the Sydney Opera House, backed by the musicians who had contributed to the album. The Dingoes and Richard Clapton were also part of the first all-Australian country-rock show to take place on the Opera House's main stage. It was Quill's final performance in Australia for almost four years.

Quill was one of the first Australian rock musicians to be awarded a grant by the Australian Council for the Arts, alongside Margret RoadKnight and guitarist Rob MacKenzie (MacKenzie Theory). The grant enabled him to travel overseas and he moved between Toronto and Sydney for most of 1975. In Toronto he put together a new band, Hot Knives, with Bolton, and Toronto-based bass guitarist Dennis Pinhorn and violinist Anne Lindsay, and expatriate Australian guitarist, keyboardist, and songwriter Sam See (ex-Sherbet, The Flying Circus, Fraternity, Lighthouse). In 1977 Australian guitarist and songwriter Chris Stockley (Cam-Pact, Axiom, The Dingoes) replaced Lindsay in 1977 and bass guitarist Bruce Worrall (also ex-Sherbet) replaced Pinhorn, the band of Toronto-based expatriates took up the name Southern Cross.

In October 1978 Southern Cross released only one single, "Been So Long" on Warner's Elektra Records label. The group split at the end of that year, during a tour of Australia. Quill returned to Canada alone. A re-arranged and remixed version of "Been So Long", with parts added in Toronto by bass guitarist Steve Hogg, singer Ian Thomas and keyboardist Hugh Syme, was released in Canada as Quill's first solo single there, but it was the B-side, the raucous, guitar-heavy "I Wonder Why", that got most of the attention on Canadian radio, particularly Toronto's then hard-rock FM station Q107 (CILQ). A proposed album, "Correspondence", produced in Toronto by Alan Thorne, and featuring mostly new Quill compositions and guest performances by Canadian guitarists Amos Garrett and Mike McKenna (Mendelson McKenna Mainline), as well as Thomas, Hogg and Syme, was never released.

=== Journalist in Canada ===
After the demise of Southern Cross in 1978 Greg Quill stopped playing music professionally for almost two decades. He resided in Toronto and then Hamilton. By 1983 he had married Ellen Davidson, a concert promoter-turned-corporate public relations executive. They had a daughter, and together they also raised her two children. Quill wrote for and edited numerous music magazines – Music Express (1981–82), Graffiti (1982–83), Applaud, The Canadian Composer, Songwriter. From 1983 he was a journalist and occasional TV and radio commentator on the arts scene in Toronto, where he was an entertainment columnist for the Toronto Star, Canada's largest newspaper.

Quill believed his earlier career helped with journalism, as "musicians sense that I know what I'm talking about, so there's an element of trust, and when there's trust they're more forthcoming than they would be with a journalist who was just off the city desk. But also I was able to frame stories in a way that led readers into an insight that illuminated the musician's life for readers, which I still think is an edge". He also published books about musicians: Bon Jovi – Bon Jovi: Hard Rock for the '80s (1987), Michael Jackson – Michael Jackson Electrifying (1988) and The Rolling Stones – The Rolling Stones 25th Anniversary Tour (1989). The latter had live reviews by Lenny Stoute.

=== Musical career resumed ===
In September 1999, an impromptu reunion in Melbourne with former bandmates Tolhurst and Stockley led to Quill's returning to performing music. Over the next two years, with Quill in Toronto and Tolhurst in New York, the pair maintained contact and resumed songwriting. They formed a duo, Quill-Tolhurst and in early 2003 issued an album, So Rudely Interrupted, in Canada on the True North Records label.

They promoted its release with a concert in October that year at C'est What? in Toronto, performing with a full band including Garth Hudson (ex The Band) on keyboards, accordion and piano. Excerpts from the show were aired nationally on Bravo! Canada's Arts & Minds and on CP24. The duo made a short Australian tour, for their first public performances there since 1973, appearing at several festivals, including the Port Fairy Folk Festival and the Brunswick Music Festival in Melbourne. Their concerts in Sydney reunited Quill with friends from his folk days at The Shack. At the final gig of the tour, at the Bridge Hotel, Sydney, Quill and Tolhurst were joined on stage by Country Radio bandmate Blanchflower.

From 2003, Quill became a regular performer in Canada's roots music scene, as both a solo act and with members of a loose collective that included Bucky Berger on drums, Anne Lindsay on violin, Denis Keldie on accordion, Cam MacInnes on guitar, and Dennis Pinhorn on bass guitar. From June 2006 to March 2008 Quill compiled and hosted the hour-long weekly Canadian roots music speciality program, River of Song, on Sirius Canada satellite radio. He returned to Australia in July 2009, and played two shows in his home town, one at the revived Shack in Narrabeen, and another at the Excelsior Hotel in Sydney, where he was joined for several songs by former bandmates Agostino and Blanchflower. In January and February 2011 Quill toured Australia's east coast, playing 15 dates with Toronto singer-songwriter, Jon Brooks. Quill started recording an album of new material during 2012.

Quill also performed with fellow expatriate Australian Terry Wilkins on bass guitar, (ex-The Flying Circus) in the band, Ironbark, which also featured Berger and MacInnes, with Mitchell Lewis on drums, guitar, and stringed instruments. On his website, Quill described Ironbark as "an extension of the traditional bush music and country-rock roots of core members Quill and Wilkins, whose musical kinship extends even further back than their time with fabled Australian country-rock bands Country Radio and Flying Circus, respectively, to Sydney's folk, blues and jug band haunts in the late 1960s".

=== Death and legacy ===
Greg Quill died on 5 May 2013 at his home in Hamilton. His family announced that he had "passed away suddenly but peacefully this afternoon from complications due to pneumonia and a recently diagnosed case of sleep apnea". Aged 66, he was still an entertainment journalist for the Toronto Star at the time of his death. He was survived by his wife, Ellen Davidson, their daughter Kaya, a grandson, and his two stepdaughters.

In the April prior to his death, Quill had announced via Facebook that he was working with Warner Music Australia and Gil Matthews' Aztec Music label on the reissue of his 1970s and 1980s recordings, and he was planning to tour Australia later in 2013 to promote them. Aztec are scheduled to release new CD versions of Quill's solo albums, Fleetwood Plain and The Outlaw's Reply, and the Country Radio Live album, with bonus tracks from a recently rediscovered recording of a 1970s festival performance by Country Radio, which includes otherwise unrecorded tracks. Warner Music (who now own the Infinity/Festival Records archive) are set to release a new edition of Gypsy Queen as a CD compilation, expanded with previously unreleased tracks.

In addition, Quill had announced plans to reissue his "lost" solo album, Correspondence, which had been recorded in Toronto in 1980 with producer Alan Thorne and featured contributions from Amos Garrett, Mike McKenna, and Ian Thomas. Quill had said that the album was being restored from a safety master that had recently come to light, and that it would also include bonus material, recorded around the same time in Canada for radio broadcasts, with his bands, Hot Knives and Southern Cross. Correspondence was due to be released on the Canadian label So Rude Records, but would have a separate Australian distributor. Quill had been set to release a new solo album of acoustic material that he had been working on over the previous few years.

== Bibliography ==
Articles cited in other works

- Orlik, Peter B (2001). "Chapter 12 'Canadian-Made Show Proves Its Work' by Greg Quill; Chapter 14 'CITY-TV's Crime Series Frightening' by Greg Quill". Electronic Media Criticism: Applied Perspectives. Routledge. pp. 220–228, 278–287. ISBN 978-0-80583-641-7.
- Quill, Greg (28 February 1993). "Atom Egoyan Misses Wide Open Net in Golden Opportunity to Score Big". Toronto Star. Star Media Group (John D. Cruickshank). p. C2.
  - quoted in Beaty, Bart (2006). "Not Playing, Working: Class, Masculinity, and Nation in the Canadian Hockey Film". In Malek Khouri; Darrell Varga (eds.). Working on Screen. University of Toronto Press. p. 128. ISBN 978-0-80209-388-2.
- Quill, Greg (3 May 1995). "Historical Vignettes Given a Dignified Debut". Toronto Star. Star Media Group (John D. Cruickshank).
  - quoted in West, Emily (2005). "Media and Its (Dis)Contents: 3 Collective Memory on the Airwaves". In Sheila Petty; Garry Sherbert; Annie Gérin (eds.). Canadian Cultural Poesis: Essays on Canadian Culture. Wilfrid Laurier University Press. pp. 72, 82. ISBN 978-0-88920-486-7.
- Quill, Greg (8 November 1995). "Is TV's Hit North of 60 Real or a White Fantasy". Toronto Star. Star Media Group (John D. Cruickshank).
  - quoted in Miller, Mary (2008). "Set Up, or How North of 60 Was Framed". Outside Looking In: Viewing First Nations Peoples in Canadian Dramatic Television Series. McGill-Queen's Press. pp. 242–243. ISBN 978-0-77357-487-8.
- Quill, Greg (13 August 1998). "Protecting Canada's Magazines". Toronto Star. Star Media Group (John D. Cruickshank). p. A23.
  - quoted in Grant, Peter S; Wood, Chris (2004). "16: Trade Wars". Blockbusters and Trade Wars: Popular Culture in a Globalized World. Douglas & McIntyre. p. 366. ISBN 978-1-92670-679-5.

Books

- Quill, Greg; Bon Jovi (1987), Bon Jovi: Hard Rock for the '80s, Downsview, Ont: Pulse, ISBN 978-0-921-01403-4
- Quill, Greg (1988), Michael Jackson Electrifying, Sidgwick & Jackson, ISBN 978-0-283-99747-1
- Quill, Greg; Stoute, Lenny (1989), The Rolling Stones 25th Anniversary Tour, Sidgwick & Jackson, ISBN 978-0-283-99979-6

== Discography ==
=== Albums ===
- Fleetwood Plain – Greg Quill and Country Radio (studio album, EMI/Harvest 1970 SHVL 602)
  - Personnel: Greg Quill – vocals, guitars; Orlando Agostino – guitars; Chris Blanchflower – harmonica; Tony Hamilton – lead guitar; Graeme Thompson – bass guitar; Stan White – piano; Jim Yonge – drums.
  - Production work: Gus McNeil – producer; John Taylor – engineer; recorded at EMI Studios, Sydney

All tracks are written by Greg Quill

No.	Title	Length
1.	"Empty Pockets" / "Leaving the City"	4:58
2.	"Fleetwood Plain"	3:30
3.	"Paradise"	3:47
4.	"Just Goodbye"	4:14
5.	"I'd not Let You Be"	3:21
6.	"Song to David"	1:45
7.	"Commissar"	4:32
8.	"Observations from a Second Storey Window"	3:39
9.	"Windy on the Main"	5:16
10.	"Susannah Lee"	4:23
11.	"If You Ever"	2:08
12.	"Kitty's Song"	6:03
Total length:		47:36

- Country Radio Live: Country Radio (live album, Festival/Infinity 1972 INL 34726)
  - Personnel: Greg Quill – vocals, acoustic guitar; John A. Bird – piano, Hammond B3; Chris Blanchflower – harmonica; Tony Bolton – drums; John Du Bois – bass guitar, harmony vocals; Kerryn Tolhurst – lap steel, dobro, mandolin, electric guitar.
  - Production work: John French and Country Radio – producers, John French and Graeme McCrae – engineers; recorded live at TCS Studios, Melbourne on 4 October 1972.

All tracks are written by Greg Quill, unless otherwise shown

No.	Title	Length
1.	"Some Lonesome Picker" (John Stewart)	4:55
2.	"Never Goin' Back" (Stewart)	3:47
3.	"Terry's Tune"	3:53
4.	"Listen to the Children"	4:30
5.	"Silver Spurs"	4:43
6.	"Gypsy Queen" (Quill, Kerryn Tolhurst)	4:02
7.	"Last Time Around"	3:32
8.	"Wintersong" (Quill, Tolhurst, John Du Bois)	5:20
9.	"Observations from a Second Storey Window"	5:03
Total length:		39:45

- Gypsy Queen: Greg Quill and Country Radio (compilation album, Festival/Infinity/Harlequin 1974 L 25113)
  - Personnel: Tracks 1, 4, 5, 6, 7 and 9: Greg Quill – vocals, acoustic guitar; John A. Bird – piano, Hammond B3, harmony vocals; Chris Blanchflower – harmonica, harmony vocals; Tony Bolton – drums, harmony vocals; John Du Bois – bass guitar, harmony vocals; Kerryn Tolhurst – lap steel, dobro, mandolin, electric guitar, harmony vocals. Track 2: Quill – vocals, electric and acoustic guitars; Bolton – drums, harmony vocals; Du Bois – bass guitar, harmony vocals; Russell Johnson – electric guitar, harmony vocals. Tracks 3 and 8: Quill – vocals, electric and acoustic guitars; Bolton – drums, harmony vocals; Du Bois – bass guitar, harmony vocals; Les Stacpool – electric guitar, harmony vocals. Additional personnel: Peter Jones – string arrangement (track 1, 7); cor anglais (track 7); piano, Hammond organ, vibraphone, celeste, conga drums (track 8). Renée Geyer – harmony vocals (track 8).

All tracks are written by Greg Quill, unless otherwise shown

No.	Title	Source details	Length
1.	"Gypsy Queen" (Quill, Kerryn Tolhurst)	Produced by John French, TCS Studios, Melbourne, 1971. Single version.	4:00
2.	"I Need Women"	Produced by John French, engineered by John Sayers, TCS Studios Melbourne, 1973. B-Side version.	4:31
3.	"Bound for South Australia" (Traditional; arranged by Quill, Tony Bolton, John Du Bois, Les Stacpool)	Produced and engineered by John French, TCS Studios, Melbourne, and ATA Studios Sydney, 1974. Single version.	3:06
4.	"Radio Rag" (Tolhurst)	Produced by Richard Batchens, Festival Studios Sydney, 1971. B-Side version.	2:05
5.	"Listen to the Children"	From Country Radio Live	4:30
6.	"Last Time Around"	From Country Radio Live	3:32
7.	"Wintersong" (Quill, Tolhurst, Du Bois)	Produced by John French, TCS Studios, Melbourne, 1972. Single version.	5:20
8.	"Singin' the Blues" (Melvin Endsley; arranged by Quill)	Produced and engineered by John French, TCS Studios, Melbourne, 1974. Single version.	3:53
9.	"Observations from a Second Storey Window"	From Country Radio Live	5:00
Total length:			35:57

- The Outlaw's Reply: Greg Quill (studio album, Festival/Infinity 1975, L-35,472)
  - Personnel: Greg Quill – vocals, acoustic guitar; Chris Blanchflower – harmonica; Tony Bolton – drums; John Du Bois – bass guitar; Russell Hinton – acoustic and electric guitars; Peter Jones, keyboards, string arrangements; Barry Leef, harmony vocals, harmony arrangements; Kerryn Tolhurst – lap steel, mandolin, dobro, acoustic and electric guitars; Peter Walker – electric guitar, clavier; Terry Walker – pedal steel.
  - Production work: John Sayers – producer; Charles Fisher – executive producer; recorded at Trafalgar Studios Sydney, November 1974 – February 1975

All tracks are written by Greg Quill

No.	Title	Length
1.	"She Do It to Me"	3:41
2.	"Terry's Tune"	3:50
3.	"Almost Freedom"	4:07
4.	"So Now, Lady"	5:29
5.	"Where Elephants Go to Die"	5:18
6.	"Silence"	7:09
7.	"Crazy People"	4:33
8.	"The Outlaw's Reply"	3:49
9.	"Blackmail"	5:47
Total length:		43:43

- Wintersongs: Greg Quill and Country Radio (compilation album, Festival File 1992)
  - Production work: Tracks from Fleetwood Plain, Country Radio Live, Gypsy Queen, The Outlaw's Reply; Glenn A. Baker – liner notes.

All tracks are written by Greg Quill, unless otherwise shown

No.	Title	Length
1.	"Fleetwood Plain"	3:30
2.	"Susannah Lee"	4:23
3.	"Listen to the Children"	4:30
4.	"Last Time Around"	3:30
5.	"Gypsy Queen" (Quill, Kerryn Tolhurst)	4:00
6.	"Radio Rag" (Tolhurst)	2:05
7.	"Wintersong" (Quill, Tolhurst, John Du Bois)	5:20
8.	"Observations from a Second Storey Window"	5:00
9.	"Some Lonesome Picker" (John Stewart)	4:55
10.	"Never Goin' Back" (Stewart)	3:47
11.	"Terry's Tune"	3:50
12.	"Silver Spurs"	4:43
13.	"Bound for South Australia" (Traditional; arranged by Quill, Tony Bolton, Du Bois, Les Stacpool)	3:06
14.	"I Need Women"	4:31
15.	"Singin' the Blues" (Melvin Endsley;)	3:53
16.	"She Do It to Me"	3:41
17.	"Almost Freedom"	4:07
18.	"The Outlaw's Reply"	3:49
Total length:		72:40

- so rudely interrupted: Quill•Tolhurst (studio album, So Rude Records (Australia) 2003 (QTCD001-2), True North Records (Canada) 2003 (TND 309))
  - Personnel: Greg Quill – vocals, acoustic guitar, percussion; Kerryn Tolhurst – acoustic and electric guitars, lap steel, dobro, mandolin, harmonium, banjo, tiple, percussion, bass guitar (except as shown otherwise). Additional personnel: Marco Giovino – drums (tracks 1, 3, 7), Neal Pawley – bass guitar (tracks 1, 7), Anne Lindsay – fiddle (tracks 1, 2, 11), Brad Smith – harmonica (track 1); Adam Armstrong – upright bass (tracks 2, 11); Paul Ossola – upright bass (track 3); Charlie Giordano – accordion (tracks 4, 11); Andrew Swann – drums (tracks 5, 9); The Pigram Brothers – vocals (track 5, 10); Monique Dimantina – piano (track 11).
  - Production work: Kerryn Tolhurst – producer, executive producer, recording engineer, mixer; Greg Quill – executive producer; Joe Johnson – recording engineer, assistant mixer; Julian McBrowne – recording engineer; Dave McNair – mastering; Paul Mills – recording engineer; Studios – Unique Studios, New York City; Studio 900, New York City; The Millstream, Toronto, Canada; Emerald City, Melbourne, Australia; Lapland, Brooklyn, NY; Howland House, Niagara-on-the-Lake, Canada; Pearly Shells Studios, Broome, Western Australia. Mixed at Studio 900, New York City. Mastered at The Engine Room, New York City.
  - Art work: Hugh Syme – cover image, graphics.

All tracks are written by Greg Quill and Kerryn Tolhurst, unless otherwise shown

No.	Title	Length
1.	"Back This Way" (Quill)	4:59
2.	"Clever Lines" (Quill)	3:52
3.	"The Killing Heart"	4:31
4.	"The Game"	3:29
5.	"Always to the Light"	5:38
6.	"Jigalong" (Tolhurst)	1:57
7.	"A Tale Too Plain"	4:30
8.	"Fleetwood Plain" (Quill)	3:17
9.	"Come to Me" (Quill)	3:52
10.	"The Boys of Narrabeen" (Quill)	4:13
11.	"Lost in a Moment" (Quill)	4:27
Total length:		43:43

=== Singles ===
==== Greg Quill and Country Radio ====
- "Fleetwood Plain" (Quill/Cellar Music) b/w "Song To David" (Quill/Cellar Music) Columbia 1970
- "Listen to the Children" (Quill/Cellar Music) b/w "Last Time Around" (Quill/Cellar Music) Festival/Infinity 1971

==== Country Radio ====
- "Gypsy Queen" (Quill-Tolhurst/Cellar Music) b/w "Radio Rag" (Tolhurst/Cellar Music) Festival/Infinity 1972, Sweet Plum Records (Canada) 1973
- "Wintersong" (Quill-Tolhurst-Bois/Cellar Music) b/w "Observations From A Second Storey Window" (Quill/Cellar Music) Festival/Infinity 1972
- "Bound For South Australia" (Traditional/Arrangement Quill-Bolton-Bois-Stacpool/Cellar Music) b/w "I Need Women" (Quill/Cellar Music) Festival/Infinity 1973

==== Greg Quill ====
- "She Do It to Me" (Quill/Cellar Music) b/w "Terry's Tune" (Quill/Cellar Music) Festival/Infinity 1975
- "Blackmail" (Quill/Cellar Music) b/w "The Outlaw's Reply" (Quill/Cellar Music) Festival/Infinity 1975
- "Been So Long" (Note: Remixed and re-edited in Toronto by Alan Thorne, with Greg Quill (vox, electric guitar), Steve Hogg (bass), Ian Thomas (harmonies), Hugh Syme (keyboards), Sam See (lead guitar), Chris Stockley (electric guitar), Tony Bolton (drums).) (Quill/Kelly Songs) b/w I "Wonder Why" (Quill/Kelly Songs) Elektra (Canada) 1979

==== Greg Quill and Southern Cross ====
- "Been So Long" (Quill/Cellar Music) b/w "I Wonder Why" (Quill/Cellar Music) WEA 1978 (Australia)

=== Other recordings ===
- Country Radio: "Silver Spurs" (Quill/Cellar Music), The Great Australian Rock Festival Sunbury (Mushroom 1973)

=== Recordings by others ===
- "Gypsy Queen"
  - The Glaser Brothers, MGM Records, USA, 1974 (single)
  - Joe Camilleri, Earth Music, Independent, Australia, 1997
  - Adam Harvey, Sugar Talk, Warner Music, Australia, 1999
- "Almost Freedom"
  - Company Caine, The Band's Alright But The Singer Is..., Reprise RS 4001, Australia, 1973
- "Fleetwood Plain"
  - Reg Lindsay, Festival Records, 1971
  - Creamcheeze Good Time Band, Home Cookin', Dominion/MCA, 1973
