= Mighty Kong =

Australian rock supergroup (1973–1975)

- Origin: Melbourne, Victoria, Australia
- Genre: Rock
- Years active: 1973–1975
- Label: Wizard
- Past members: Ross Hannaford; Ross Wilson; Russell Smith; Ray Arnott; Tim Partridge

Mighty Kong were an Australian supergroup successor to Daddy Cool, which broke up in August 1972. It was also the fifth (and technically the last) in the line of groups that featured singer-songwriter Ross Wilson and guitarist Ross Hannaford, which began with Pink Finks in 1965. Despite its all-star line-up, drawing from three of the top groups of the time, the band was short-lived and never really achieved its considerable potential, effectively relegated to being a footnote in the story of Daddy Cool.

== History ==
=== Earlier days ===
The formative stages of the new group occurred in late 1972 – early 1973, and involved several notable players of the day. After Company Caine broke up in October 1972, singer/lyricist Gulliver Smith linked with Wilson and Hannaford. They worked for several months on getting a new band together, but Smith moved on to launch his solo career at the end of 1972.

At the start of 1973 Hannaford and Wilson got together with guitarist Tim Gaze (Tamam Shud, Kahvas Jute) and drummer Nigel Macara (Tamam Shud), but after about a month of rehearsals Gaze left and Macara followed. Gaze's place was taken by Company Caine guitarist Russell Smith, who had been off playing in the touring version of G.Wayne Thomas' studio 'supergroup' Duck. For a new drummer, Hannaford and Wilson turned to Ray Arnott, who announced in March that he was leaving his current gig with Spectrum to join the new band (which also reunited him with Russell Smith, his former bandmate from the last days of Cam-Pact and the early Company Caine).

Unfortunately, Arnott's departure triggered the break-up of Spectrum, as founder Mike Rudd felt that it wouldn't be possible recruit a new member and maintain Spectrum's special chemistry. Spectrum played their farewell concert in mid-April 1973 and Arnott was then able to join the new group, Gaze and Macara hitched up with the remaining members of Spectrum (Rudd and Bill Putt) to form Ariel. With the final addition of bassist Tim Partridge (also ex-Company Caine) the new band was complete and was launched in May 1973 under the name Mighty Kong.

After the break-up of Daddy Cool, Wilson and Hannaford were keen to get away from that band's stylistic restrictions (i.e. the 50s repertoire, and the 'zany' stage outfits), which tended to obscure the more serious side of their work. The material that they put together was a heavier, contemporary rock style, bringing in some of the progressive elements which had featured in their earlier band Sons of the Vegetal Mother, and which had resurfaced on Daddy Cool's second album, Sex Dope, Rock'n'Roll: Teenage Heaven.

=== All I Wanna Do Is Rock ===
Mighty Kong's only album, All I Wanna Do Is Rock, was recorded at Melbourne's Armstrong's Studios, engineered and produced by John Fischbach on Robbie Porter's Wizard label. Regrettably the group never really gelled, and Wilson stated in a 2007 interview that it lacked the chemistry that made Daddy Cool such a successful group. Mighty Kong had already split up by the time the album and its accompanying single, "Callin' All Cats" / "Hard Drugs (Are Bad For You)" were released in December 1973, but without a band to promote them, the records made no impression on the charts.

In early 1973 Wilson and Hannaford bowed to financial pressures, the split of Daddy Cool had left them with large debts so they reformed Daddy Cool for what was meant to be a one-off performance at the 1974 Sunbury Festival. It was rapturously received, and prompted a full reformation, with more touring and recording; this incarnation of the band lasted until September 1975.

=== Post Mighty Kong ===
Ray Arnott moved on to a short stint in The Dingoes, replacing original drummer John Lee for several months; then followed his own bands One Nite Stand and the Ray Arnott Band, as well as a stint in Cold Chisel in the 1980s, during the period when Steve Prestwich had left the group.

Ross Hannaford played with a success of fine bands through the 1970s and 1980s, including Billy T, Heavy Division (with Russell Smith) and a stint in Goanna. In the 1990s he was at the Esplanade Hotel, St Kilda, where he had a long-running residency with his band Diana'a Kiss.

Tim Partidge moved on to other bands, and became a sought-after session player. After Mighty Kong, he played with Cool Bananas and Aunty Jack & The Gong, the touring bands put together to back Aunty Jack Show members Grahame Bond and Rory O'Donoghue. From there he worked with many well known groups including the Barry Leef Band (1976), two spells with Kevin Borich Express (1976–77, 1979–80), the Foreday Riders, Heavy Division (where he reunited him with Smith and Hannaford) and The Renee Geyer Band (1978). Partridge now teaches at the Tasmanian Conservatorium of Music in Hobart. Tim Partridge died in late 2020.

Russell Smith went on to Metropolis, followed by the re-formation of Company Caine in 1975, then Billy T, Heavy Division and Goanna (1983). These days he resides in Perth and is a member of Jeffrey St John & The Embers.

Ross Wilson endured a hiatus in his recording career due to a dispute with the Wizard label that resulted from Daddy Cool's abortive attempt to record a new album in 1974. Late that year 1974 he launched his highly successful career as a producer, overseeing three LPs for Skyhooks, including their debut Living in the 70s, which broke the previous sales record for an Australian album, set by Daddy Cool. In 1976 he was briefly reunited with Hannaford for the soundtrack to the Chris Lofven film Oz. In 1978 he formed Mondo Rock which became one of the most successful Australian bands of the 1980s. Wilson and Hannaford reformed Daddy Cool in 2007 to play support for Australian tour by Mike Love's Beach Boys and Christopher Cross.

Aztec Music announced that it would re-issue Mighty Kong's album, All I Wanna Do Is Rock, on a CD format in 2008.

== Members ==
- Ross Wilson – chief vocals, pignose guitar on "Homesick & Horny"
- Ross Hannaford – guitar, deep throat
- Russell Smith – guitar, lead vocals on "Some Other New Address"
- Tim Partridge – bass guitar
- Ray Arnott – drums

== Discography ==
=== Studio albums ===
List of albums, with Australian chart positions
Title	Album details	Peak chart positions
Title	Album details	AUS
All I Wanna Do Is Rock	Released: December 1973; Format: LP; Label: Wizard Records (Z5 204)	56

=== Singles ===
Year	Title
1973	"Calling All Cats" / "Hard Drugs (Are Bad for You)"
