= Spectrum (Australian band) =

Australian progressive rock band

- Also known as: Spectrum Plays the Blues
- Origin: Melbourne, Victoria, Australia
- Genres: Progressive rock, psychedelic rock, blues rock
- Years active: 1969–1973, 1999–present
- Labels: EMI; Harvest; His Master's Voice; RareVision; Volcano
- Spinoffs: Indelible Murtceps; Ariel
- Members: Mike Rudd; Broc O'Connor; Peter 'Robbo' Robertson; Daryl Roberts
- Past members: Mark Kennedy; Lee Neale; Bill Putt; Ray Arnott; John Mills
- Website: mikeruddbillputt.com

Spectrum was an Australian progressive rock band which formed in April 1969 and broke up in April 1973. They are best known for their number-one hit, "I'll Be Gone" in January 1971.

The original line-up was Mark Kennedy on drums, Lee Neale on organ (ex-Nineteen87), Bill Putt on bass guitar (ex-Lost Souls), and Mike Rudd on guitar and lead vocals (ex-Chants R&B, The Party Machine). In August 1970 Kennedy was replaced by Ray Arnott on drums. These members also performed under the alter ego, Indelible Murtceps, from 1971 to 1973. After Spectrum and Indelible Murtceps disbanded, Putt and Rudd formed Ariel. In 1999 the pair formed Spectrum Plays the Blues, which later trimmed their name back to Spectrum. On 7 August 2013 Bill Putt died, after a heart attack.

== History ==
=== 1969–1971: Early years ===
Spectrum were formed in April 1969 in Melbourne, as a progressive rock group, by Mark Kennedy on drums (ex-Gallery), Lee Neale on organ (ex-Nineteen87), Bill Putt on bass guitar (ex-Gallery, The Lost Souls), and Mike Rudd on guitar, harmonica and lead vocals (ex-Chants R&B, The Party Machine, Sons of the Vegetal Mother). Initially the group drew on the work of contemporary bands such as Traffic, Soft Machine and Pink Floyd; they played cover versions of their material. Spectrum developed their own style as Rudd began writing original material. Alongside Kennedy's drum solos, Putt's bass playing and Neale's keyboard work, a feature of Spectrum's sound was Rudd's guitar playing — he eschewed the near-universal use of guitar picks – using a finger-picking style on a vintage Fender Stratocaster to develop a characteristic sound.

During twelve months of regularly performing on the local dance and discothèque circuit, Spectrum refined their original material. They appeared at various "head" (see cannabis slang) venues around Melbourne: T.F. Much Ballroom, Garrison and Sebastian's, alongside other progressive rockers, Tully, Tamam Shud and Sons of the Vegetal Mother. Spectrum used an elaborate set-up which included a large PA and a full multi-media light show; often supplemented by a performance troupe, Tribe. Early in 1970 they cut a demo single which they hawked to record companies as a 7" acetate. One side was an early, folk version of "I'll Be Gone". The B-side was another original, "You Just Can't Win". According to rock music historian, Ian McFarlane, these acetates are now "impossibly rare" and only two or three copies are known to have survived.

Despite a loyal following and praise from the music press – including from Australia's pop newspaper Go-Set – the band were almost broke by mid-1970. After they signed to EMI under their progressive rock imprint, Harvest Records, the band went into the studio in August 1970 to make their first official recordings, using producer, Howard Gable (The Masters Apprentices). Rudd described the recording sessions, "[we had] gone into the studio in order to record 'Launching Place Parts I & II', to help promote the Launching Place Festival. When we had finished recording those, Howard asked us did we have any others and I said, 'Yeah, I've got this one called "I'll Be Gone"', which we recorded as an afterthought. But then it became a hit single." Rudd had decided to add a harmonica part to the song.

Music from Spectrum Part One
"Make Your Stash", written by Ross Wilson

"Launching Place, Part II (Psychedelic version)", written by Mike Rudd

The festival at Launching Place occurred in December 1970. "I'll Be Gone" was released in January 1971, which became a surprise No. 1 Australian hit on the Go-Set National Top 60 singles chart in May that year. It became one of the most enduring Australian rock songs of that era. McFarlane described it as a "shuffling, hypnotic" track, for which "suddenly the band was in big demand."

=== 1971–1973: Albums and Indelible Murtceps ===
Spectrum released their debut studio album, Spectrum Part One, in March 1971, although it did not include the hit single. Rudd had refused to add it as "It didn't fit with the innovative roaming style of the rest of the music." The album reached No. 10 in April. Kennedy had left in August of the previous year just after it was recorded, he had "lost patience" as the group "struggled for gigs (promoters found them 'too progressive')." He was replaced on drums and vocals by Ray Arnott (ex-Chelsea Set, Cam-Pact, Company Caine). Rudd praised Kennedy's musicianship: "Mark really carried us through the first year because people would say 'Wow, look at that drummer, they must be a good group'... He used to play things like drum solos!, but he was very good. By the same token, I was almost relieved to get away from that 'cause the emphasis swung back to the material and the band in general rather than one player." Kennedy later worked with Leo de Castro, Ayers Rock and then Marcia Hines.

Spectrum's follow up singles, "Trust Me" (June 1971) and "But That's Alright" (November), did not reach the top 60. During October that year Spectrum formed a side project, Indelible Murtceps, using the same line-up of Arnott on drums, Neale on electric piano, Putt on bass guitar and Rudd on vocals and guitar. They performed at pubs, and local dances, playing a more dance/pop-oriented repertoire and using a simpler set-up than when performing as Spectrum.

Their second album, Milesago, was released in December 1971, as the first Australian rock music double album. It is also the first Australian rock album to be recorded using a 16-track recorder – newly installed – at Armstrong Studios during the previous September. McFarlane stated that it "remains one of the landmark releases of the Australian progressive rock era." It peaked at No. 9 on the Go-Set Top 20 Albums chart. By September 1972 Neale had left both bands; he was replaced by John Mills on keyboards. Neale quit the music scene permanently after leaving Spectrum and Indelible Murtceps.

Spectrum's third studio album, Testimonial, was co-credited to Indelible Murtceps. It appeared in July 1973, which reached No. 12. In March, before its release, Arnott announced he was going to join Mighty Kong. Putt and Rudd decided to end both bands; each played their farewell gig at the Dallas Brooks Hall in Melbourne on 15 April 1973. It was recorded and released in December 1973 as a double live album, Terminal Buzz. Both of these releases were produced by Peter Dawkins.

Spectrum had toured other Australian rock festivals, including, Wallacia (January 1971), Myponga (February), Sunbury (January 1972, January 1973), Mulwala (April 1972), and Rosebud. Their national profile was limited by a lack of radio airplay in other capitals and, other than festivals, they rarely toured outside Victoria. Ian McFarlane opined that the group were "one of the first underground bands of the early 1970s to gain mainstream acceptance. [Their] brand of progressive rock was often built around long, complex musical passages, very much in the vein of UK bands... Yet the band did embrace a commercial aesthetic at times."

=== 1973–1999: After disbanding and reunions ===
Following the disbandment of Spectrum and Indelible Murtceps, Rudd, Putt and Mills formed Ariel in mid-1973. The other members were Tim Gaze on guitar and Nigel Macara on drums (both ex-Tamam Shud). After Ariel disbanded in 1977, Rudd and Putt continued their musical collaborations in a series of groups: Instant Replay, Mike Rudd and the Heaters, W.H.Y., No. 9 and The Burwood Blues Band. After Mighty Kong disbanded at the end of 1973, Ray Arnott was a member of The Dingoes (1974–76), Ray Arnott Band (1978–80), Cold Chisel 1983–84) and Jimmy Barnes Band (1984–85).

EMI issued a compilation album, Red Orange Yellow Green Blue Indigo Violet, early in 1984 and during March that year Spectrum undertook a reunion tour with the line-up of Arnott, Putt, and Rudd joined by Tony Fossey on keyboards (ex-Mike Rudd and the Heaters). Subsequent reformations occurred: in 1989 with Fossey, Putt and Rudd joined by Martyn Sullivan on guitar and bass guitar; and David Hicks on drums. In the following year Hicks was replaced by Trevor Courtney on drums. The 1991 line-up of Courtney, Putt, Rudd, Sullivan, with Cres Crisp on keyboards performed as Spectrum Plays the Blues. During the early 1990s Putt and Rudd worked as an acoustic duo with various guest musicians. From 1995 they continued "to perform under a variety of names, to suit different situations and line-ups, but predominantly still call themselves Spectrum."

=== 1999–current: Spectrum Plays the Blues & Breathing Space ===
By 1999 Putt and Rudd had formed another band together, Spectrum Plays the Blues, which included Spectrum material in their set list. They issued two albums, Spill (March 1999) and No Thinking (June 2004); before they trimmed the name back to Spectrum. In May 2008 the first new recording under that name, Breathing Space, was released as a six-track EP on the band's own label, Volcano Records. The EP features guest musicians, including Gaze.

In 2004, TISM sampled "Launching Place, Part II" in their song "As Seen on Reality", which appeared on their album The White Albun that year.

Aztec Music reissued Milesago on CD for the first time, with extra tracks. The label then reissued Spectrum Part One in 2007, with its bonus tracks titled Spectrum Part Two. A second EP, Breathing Space Too, was released on Volcano in 2009, and a third EP, Breathing Space As Well, followed in 2011. Spectrum played in either three- or four-piece mode. Spectrum's bass guitarist Bill Putt died of a heart attack on 7 August 2013. Rudd continued Spectrum with Dirk Dubois very briefly then Broc O'Connor on bass guitar, Daryl Roberts on keyboards and Peter 'Robbo' Robertson on drums and percussion. Spectrum's keyboardist Lee Neale died on 31 March 2019.

== Personnel ==
Current

- Mike Rudd – guitars, lead vocals, harmonica (4/1969–4/1973, 1999–present)
- Broc O'Connor – bass guitar (2013–present)
- Peter 'Robbo' Robertson – drums, percussion (1999–present)
- Daryl Roberts – keyboards (1999–present)

Former

- Bill Putt – bass (4/1969–4/1973, 1999–2013; died 2013)
- Lee Neale – keyboards, backing vocals (4/1969–9/1972; died 2019)
- Mark Kennedy – drums (4/1969–8/1970; died 2026)
- Ray Arnott – drums, backing vocals (8/1970–4/1973)
- John Mills – keyboards (9/1972–4/1973)

== Discography ==
=== Studio albums ===
List of albums, with selected chart positions
Title	Album details	Peak chart positions
Title	Album details	AUS
Spectrum Part One	Released: 1 March 1971; Format: LP; Label: Harvest (SHVL 601)	10
Milesago	Released: November 1971; Format: LP; Label: Harvest (SHDW 5051)	9
Warts Up Your Nose split (credited to Indelible Murtceps)	Released: 1973; Format: LP; Label: His Master's Voice (OCSD 7697)	12
Testimonial (credited to Spectrum and Indelible Murtceps)	Released: July 1973; Format: LP; Label: Harvest (SHDW 50/51)	—
Spill split (credited as Spectrum Plays the Blues)	Released: 1999; Format: CD; Label: Volcano (VR002)	—
No Thinking split (credited as Spectrum Plays the Blues)	Released: 2004; Format: Label:	—

=== Live albums ===
List of live albums
Title	Album details
Terminal Buzz (credited to Spectrum and Indelible Murtceps)	Released: December 1973; Format: 2×LP; Label: His Master's Voice (SOELP10081/2)

=== Compilation albums ===
List of compilation albums
Title	Album details
Red.Orange.Yellow.Green.Blue.Indigo.Violet (credited to Spectrum and Indelible Murtceps)	Released: 1984; Format: CD, LP, cassette; Label: EMI Music (EME.1100)
Ghosts: Post-Terminal Reflections' (credited to Spectrum and Murtceps)	Released: 1991; Format: CD, LP, cassette; Label: Raven (RVCD-18)

=== Extended plays ===
List of EPs
Title	EP details
Breathing Space	Released: 2008; Format: CD, download; Label: Volcano (VR003)
Breathing Space Too	Released: 2009; Format: CD, download; Label: Volcano (VR004)
Breathing Space As Well	Released: 2011; Format: CD, download; Label: Volcano (VR005)

=== Singles ===
List of singles, with selected chart positions
Title	Year	Peak chart positions
Title	Year	AUS
"I'll Be Gone" / "Launching Place Part II"	1971	1
"Trust Me" (alternate version) / "Going Home"	1971	—
"But That's Alright" / "Play a Song That I Know"	1971	—
"Esmeralda" / "We Are Indelible" (as Indelible Murtceps)	1972	36
"Indelible Shuffle" / "Ray's Boogie" (as Indelible Murtceps)	1973	—

== See also ==
- Indelible Murtceps
- Ariel (band)

== Awards and nominations ==
=== Go-Set Pop Poll ===
The Go-Set Pop Poll was coordinated by teen-oriented pop music newspaper, Go-Set and was established in February 1966 and conducted an annual poll during 1966 to 1972 of its readers to determine the most popular personalities.

Year	Nominee / work	Award	Result
1971	themselves	Best Group	5th
1971	Spectrum Part One	Best Australian Album	5th
1971	"I'll Be Gone"	Best Australian Single	5th
1972	themselves	Best Group	4th
1972	Milesago	Best Australian Album	4th
