= Mark Kennedy (musician) =

Australian musician (1951–2026)

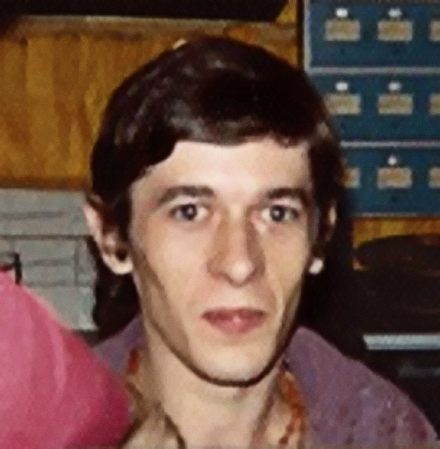
- Kennedy at the Record Plant, Los Angeles in 1975

Background information
- Born: 20 August 1951; Melbourne, Australia
- Died: 21 February 2026 (aged 74) Clayton, Victoria, Australia
- Genres: Rock; jazz fusion; progressive rock
- Occupations: Musician; record producer
- Instruments: Drums; percussion
- Years active: 1968–2026
- Formerly of: Spectrum; Ayers Rock

Mark Kennedy (20 August 1951 – 21 February 2026) was an Australian musician who was the drummer for several artists including Spectrum (1969–70), Doug Parkinson in Focus (1971), Leo de Castro (1971–73), Ayers Rock (1973–76), Marcia Hines (1976–83), Men at Work (1985), Renée Geyer (1985–86, 1995–96) and Jimmy Barnes (2005).

== Life and career ==
=== 1968–1970: Gallery and Spectrum ===
Mark Kennedy was born on 20 August 1951 in Melbourne. Kennedy was trained in classical piano at the Melbourne Conservatorium of Music for six years. In 1968 he was the drummer for Gallery, alongside Bill Putt on lead guitar. Putt recalled that they had "Three girl singers in real short dresses, me on guitar, a bass-player and Mark Kennedy on drums." In April 1969 Kennedy and Putt, now on bass guitar, formed a progressive rock group, Spectrum, with Lee Neale on organ (ex-Nineteen87), and Mike Rudd on guitar, harmonica and lead vocals (ex-Chants R&B, The Party Machine). Brian Cadd had wanted Kennedy for his group, Axiom, "He had the sort of funky, slinky, laid-back style we were looking for."

Mark Kennedy performing with Spectrum
"Fiddling Fool" (1971), written by Mike Rudd
Drum solo by Kennedy. He later opined "the best drummers are musicians who play the drums, not like the tradesman kind of mentality, the better guys are the guys who understand where the music is, the voicing of it and get amongst it and create a language."

Rudd remembered meeting Kennedy and Putt for the first time "Bill, of course being enormously tall, and Mark actually being a tiny little fella – he must've been around 5'3" or 4" or something ... there was an astonishing kinda disparity between the two." Kennedy remained with Spectrum until they recorded their debut album, Spectrum Part One (March 1971), in August 1970. He had "lost patience" as the group "struggled for gigs (promoters found them 'too progressive')."

Rudd described Kennedy's impact on Spectrum: "[he] really carried us through the first year because people would say 'Wow, look at that drummer, they must be a good group' ... He used to play things like drum solos!, but he was very good. By the same token, I was almost relieved to get away from that 'cause the emphasis swung back to the material and the band in general rather than one player." Nevertheless, the group's debut single, "I'll Be Gone" (January 1971), which had been recorded while Kennedy was still a member, reached No. 1 on the Go-Set National Top 60 singles chart.

=== 1970–1971: King Harvest and Doug Parkinson in Focus ===
In September 1970 Kennedy formed King Harvest as a progressive rock group with Leo de Castro on vocals and guitar, Jimmy Doyle on guitar (Silhouettes, Aesop's Fables, Moonstone), Duncan McGuire on bass guitar (Phantoms, Epics, Questions, Doug Parkinson in Focus, Rush) and Steve Yates on keyboards (Rush, Expression). Billy Green on guitar (Doug Parkinson in Focus) replaced Doyle; Green, in turn, was replaced by Rob MacKenzie, and then by Ray Oliver (The Light). In January 1971 King Harvest issued a cover version of "Wichita Lineman", which peaked at No. 35 on the National Top 60.

By March 1971 Kennedy and McGuire had left King Harvest to join Doug Parkinson in Focus, which were a pop rock group led by Parkinson on vocals. Due to legal disputes Parkinson found difficulties in recording at that time, although they released a single, "Purple Curtains" (September 1971). Also during that year Cadd invited Kennedy and McGuire to work on Russell Morris's album, Bloodstone (August 1971). By December Kennedy and McGuire had joined Leo de Castro & Friends. The initial line-up included MacKenzie, Tim Martin on saxophone and flute, and Charlie Tumahai on vocals and percussion (Healing Force, Chain). Friends appeared at the inaugural Sunbury Pop Festival in January 1972.

=== 1972: Friends ===
In August 1972 Friends released a single, "B-B-Boogie", which rock music historian, Ian McFarlane, described as "exceptional hard rock". Duncan Kimball of MilesAgo website felt it was a "solid boogie-rock number." The track was co-written by Kennedy with de Castro, McGuire and Tumahai. Kimball preferred the B-side, "Freedom Train", which he opined was a "driving, prog-jazz" track that "became their signature tune", it was "one of the best Australian progressive recordings of the '70s." McFarlane noticed that it was a "jubilant jazz-tinged" work.

Friends appeared at the Sunbury Pop Festival in January 1973 as a six-piece: Kennedy, de Castro, Green, Martin, McGuire and Oliver. Three of their performances "Lucille", "Bird on a Wire" and "La La Song", were recorded for a live 3× LP album, Sunbury 1973 – The Great Australian Rock Festival (April) by various artists on Mushroom Records. Soon after Green, Martin and Oliver left and, in April, Ray Burton joined on guitar (ex-Delltones, Executives). In June a four-piece line-up of Kennedy, Burton, de Castro and McGuire performed "Freedom Train" and McGuire's newly written track, "Lady Montego", at one of the final concerts at The Garrison venue. The tracks were issued on the live album, Garrison: The Final Blow, Unit 1, by various artists on Mushroom Records.

=== 1973–1976: Burton, McGuire & Kennedy becomes Ayers Rock ===
Burton, McGuire & Kennedy all left de Castro in June 1973 to form an eponymous trio. They added Doyle in August and became Ayers Rock, a jazz fusion, progressive rock group, by September. That group's lead single was a cover version of "Lady Montego", which also appeared on their debut album, Big Red Rock (November 1974).

Also late in 1974 Ayers Rock members, including Kennedy on drums and percussion, were session musicians for solo singer-songwriter, Jim Keays, debut album, The Boy from the Stars. Solo singer, Marcia Hines (ex-Daly-Wilson Big Band), provided backing vocals. At the January 1975 Sunbury Pop Festival, Keays performed most of the album live, with three Ayers Rock members (Brown, McGuire and Kennedy) joining the ensemble to record, "Nothing Much Left" and "Urantia". Ayers Rock also performed at that festival. From July to September they promoted Big Red Rock in the United States and Vancouver. At the end of that tour they recorded their second album, Beyond (April 1976), in Los Angeles. In February 1976 prior to its appearance Kennedy left the group to join Hines's backing band.

=== 1976–1983: Marcia Hines ===
Kennedy had worked with Hines since mid-1975 when he was a session drummer on her debut album, Marcia Shines (October 1975). While still a member of Ayers Rock, Kennedy had backed Hines on her national tour in October–November 1975. He was recorded on her subsequent albums from Shining (November 1976) to Love Sides (May 1983). Kennedy and Hines were engaged by November 1976 but did not marry. Hines's highest-charting single was "You" (written by Tom Snow), which reached No. 2 on the Kent Music Report singles charts in October 1977. Her producer-manager, Robie Porter, had put it into his "don't use" pile; Kennedy saw the sheet music in the studio and began arguing the song's worth to Porter. Porter subsequently changed his mind about it. Aside from musical assistance Kennedy also designed Hines's performance costumes.

Outside of his work for Hines, Kennedy also rejoined McGuire and Parkinson in early 1978 in the Southern Star Band, with Frank Esler-Smith on keyboards (ex-Marcia Hines Band) and Jim Gannon on guitar (ex-Black Widow, Yellow Dog). Soon after Gannon was replaced by Tommy Emmanuel on guitar. Southern Star Band issued an album, I'll Be Around, in February 1979 which provided "slick, funky jazz over an R&B foundation" and four singles. Kennedy and McGuire co-produced the album at ATA Sound Studios, Sydney. Only the title track, a cover version of The Spinners' song, reached the Kent Music Report's top 40 – peaking at No. 22 in March. In October 1981 Kennedy provided drums and percussion for Toivo Pilt's (ex-Sebastian Hardie, Windchase) score of a documentary film, Spirit of the Maya. His percussion work is used on Duran Duran's third studio album, Seven and the Ragged Tiger (November 1983).

=== 1985: Men at Work ===
Early in 1985 Kennedy worked as a session drummer on Men at Work's third album, Two Hearts (23 April 1985). The group's long-term members Greg Ham on flute and keyboards; Colin Hay on lead vocals; and Ron Strykert on lead guitar; had hired Kennedy, and Jeremy Alsop on bass guitar (ex-Ram Band, Pyramid, Broderick Smith Band). Strykert left soon after its appearance and, for the tour in support of its release, Ham and Hay used Kennedy, Alsop and James Black on guitar and keyboards (Mondo Rock, The Black Sorrows). During late 1985 and early 1986 he was a member of the Renée Geyer Band, while the singer toured nationally.

In October 1987 Kennedy rejoined Leo de Castro & Friends for a two-night series of performances, which was issued later that year on cassette as Voodoo Soul – Live at The Basement. With Kennedy on drums, the line-up included Jason Brewer on saxophone, Leo de Castro on lead vocals, Jimmy Doyle on guitar, David Green on bass guitar, Dave MacRae on piano, Jason McDermid on trumpet, Mark Punch on guitar and vocals, and Andy Thompson on saxophone. In 2010 Big Beat Music issued a CD version.

=== 1993–1999: Blazing Salads and Renée Geyer ===
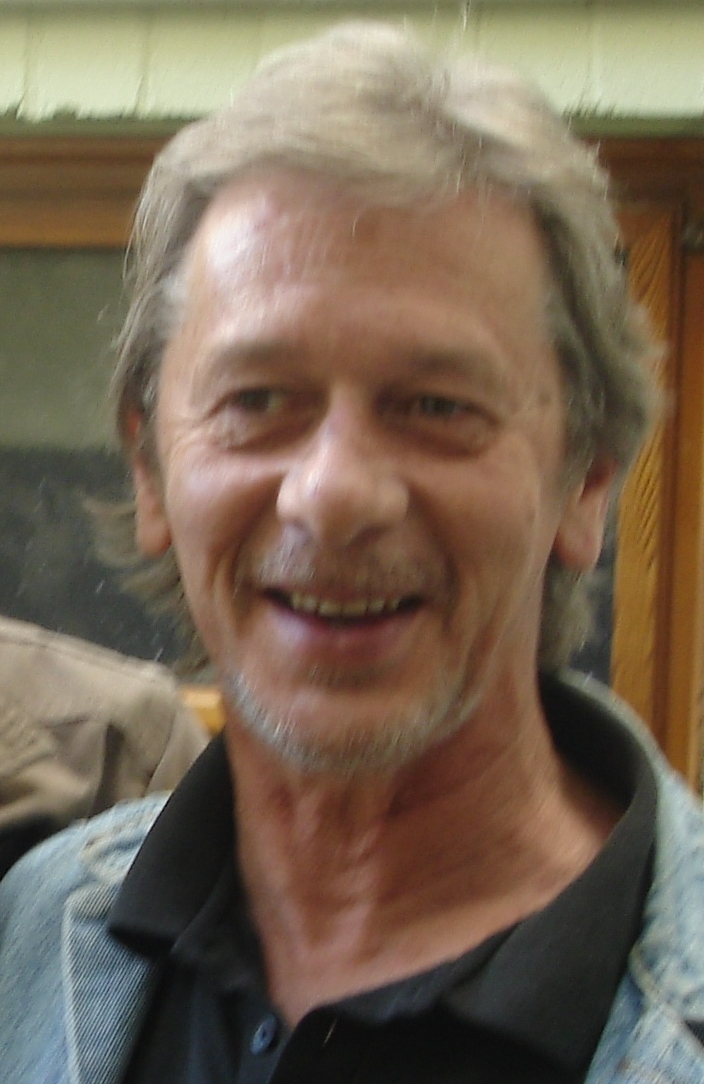
Mark Kennedy in 2009

In 1993 Kennedy on drums and percussion joined Blazing Salads, which were formed by Cadd on lead vocals and keyboards, and Glenn Shorrock on lead vocals (both ex-Axiom). The line-up included Rex Goh on guitar (ex-Air Supply) and Kirk Lorange on guitar (ex-Richard Clapton Band). They released a self-titled album in that year and toured the club and cabaret circuit for two years. Also in 1993 Kennedy worked with various artists on the soundtrack for Seven Deadly Sins, an ABC-TV mini-series; vocalists were Geyer, Vika Bull, Deborah Conway and Paul Kelly. From 1995 to 1996 he resumed duties with Renée Geyer Band alongside Paul Berton on guitar, George Powers on keyboards and Hal Tupaea on bass guitar.

Geyer used Kennedy and Berton again on her solo album, Sweet Life (March 1999), with Harry Brus on bass guitar, and Paul Gray on keyboards. In June that year Kennedy, Berton, Brus and Gray backed Geyer on four tracks for ABC-TV series, Studio 22; they were joined by Dan Knight on organ.

=== 2000–2025 ===
In an interview with Chris Quinlan for Drummer Magazine in February 2000, Kennedy opined that "the best drummers are musicians who play the drums, not like the tradesman kind of mentality, the better guys are the guys who understand where the music is, the voicing of it and get amongst it and create a language." In July 2005 Kennedy was a session drummer on Jimmy Barnes's album, Double Happiness for his duet with Billy Thorpe and their cover of "Shout" – originally by the Isley Brothers and previously covered by fellow Australian, Johnny O'Keefe.

By 2006 Kennedy was in James Southwell Band, a blues-rock group, with Southwell on lead vocals and guitar, and Tim Partridge on bass guitar. The group played at the 2014 Bayside Blues Festival in October.

In December 2024 Kennedy appeared with Leo Sayer at the Meredith Music Festival.

== Death ==
Kennedy died on 21 February 2026, at the age of 74, following a period of health challenges. He spent his last days at McCulloch House, the palliative care specialists at the Monash Medical Centre in Clayton, Victoria.

== Awards and nominations ==
=== Go-Set Pop Poll ===
The Go-Set Pop Poll was coordinated by teen-oriented pop music newspaper, Go-Set and was established in February 1966 and conducted an annual poll during 1966 to 1972 of its readers to determine the most popular personalities.

Year	Nominee / work	Award	Result
1971	Himself	Best Drummer	4th
