= I'll Be Gone (Spectrum song) =

- 7" label

Single by Spectrum
- A-side: "I'll Be Gone"
- B-side: "Launching Place Part II"
- Released: January 1971
- Recorded: August 1970
- Genre: Progressive rock
- Length: 3:28
- Label: Harvest
- Songwriter: Mike Rudd
- Producer: Howard Gable

Spectrum singles chronology
"I'll Be Gone" (1971)	"Trust Me" (1971)

Audio sample
- "I'll Be Gone": file; help

"I'll Be Gone" (or titled "Some Day I'll Have Money") is a song by Australian progressive rock group Spectrum released as their debut single by EMI on Harvest Records in January 1971. It peaked at #1 on the national singles chart, while it reached Top 5 in Melbourne, Sydney and Brisbane. The song was written by guitarist and vocalist Mike Rudd, and produced by Howard Gable. The B-side, "Launching Place Part Two" was written to promote a music festival. Spectrum never repeated the success of "I'll Be Gone".

== Background ==
Spectrum was formed in Melbourne in 1969 by Mike Rudd, a New Zealand-born singer, songwriter and guitarist (ex-Chants R&B, The Party Machine, Sons of the Vegetal Mother), together with bassist Bill Putt (Gallery, The Lost Souls), organist Lee Neale (ex-Nineteen 87), and drummer Mark Kennedy. Spectrum played covers of Traffic, Soft Machine and Pink Floyd initially, they then developed their own style and wrote a set of original material. Just prior to being signed up by EMI, Spectrum cut a demo single which they hawked to record companies as a 7" acetate. One side was an early, folky version of "I'll Be Gone", according to rock historian Ian McFarlane, these acetates are now "impossibly rare" and only two or three copies are known to have survived.

Once signed to EMI's progressive imprint Harvest Records, Spectrum went into the studio to make their first official recordings under producer Howard Gable, who had worked with The Masters Apprentices. They had a #1 Australian hit with their first single, "I'll Be Gone", which has become one of the most enduring Australian rock songs of that era. The B-side, "Launching Place Part Two" was written to promote a music festival. They released their debut LP Spectrum Part One in March 1971 but Rudd would not allow their hit single to appear on the album. Drummer Kennedy left just after it was recorded and was replaced by Ray Arnott (ex-Cam-Pact, Company Caine).

Ross Wilson, vocalist and guitarist, had been a founding member of The Party Machine with Rudd, they were later both members of Sons of the Vegetal Mother, Wilson formed Daddy Cool as a side-project while Rudd went on to form Spectrum. During their time in 'Vegetals' Rudd had started working on "I'll Be Gone" and Wilson approved of the song, "That's it, that's the one". Daddy Cool and Spectrum often toured together in their early years. Rudd described the development of the song:

The song didn't actually take very long to write, but it changed over the period of about a year. Initially, I didn't have the harmonica in it, and that was a big transition [...] We went to Bill Armstrong's studios in Albert Park to record a couple of tunes to advertise the Launching Place Festival [...] We recorded Launching Place Parts One and Two and the producer, Howard Gable, said: 'Have you got any other songs?' Remembering what Ross Wilson had said, I replied, 'Yeah, I've got this other one.' [...] We were in Sydney when it was finally released. We heard it on the radio and it had been edited, so we were slightly shocked. Fortunately, we'd also made a video for the song with Chris Löfvén. I think the video helped tremendously. TV stations were hungry for anything and this was one of the earliest clips.

— Mike Rudd

Although recorded in August 1970 the song was not released until January 1971 due to the 1970 radio ban, which was a dispute between radio stations and major record labels over payments for songs being broadcast. Chris Löfvén went on to direct the video for Daddy Cool's debut single "Eagle Rock" which also peaked at #1 later in 1971. The Launching Place Festival was a minor festival held on 31 December 1970 at Launching Place 60 km east of Melbourne, other acts included Wendy Saddington, Billy Thorpe & the Aztecs, Healing Force and King Harvest. Spectrum recorded "Launching Place Part One" and "Launching Place Part Two" to promote the festival.

== Cover versions ==
Several cover versions of "I'll Be Gone" have been recorded by artists including Colleen Hewett, Margret RoadKnight and Manfred Mann's Earth Band. The latter was released, along with B-side "Launching Place Part Two", on their 1974 LP The Good Earth.

In 1984 Australian country music singer John Williamson paid tribute to the song by recording his own version, a version which kept the originality but also suited his own brand of country music. Palladium recorded a version for the film Dirty Deeds.

John Schumann and the Vagabond Crew covered the song on their 2008 album Behind the Lines.

"Launching Place, Pt. II" was sampled by alternative rockers TISM on their 2004 song "As Seen on Reality", which appeared on their album The White Albun that year.

== Legacy ==
In May 2001 the Australasian Performing Right Association (APRA), as part of its 75th Anniversary celebrations, named "I'll Be Gone" as one of the Top 30 Australian songs of all time. Since its release in 1971, the song has become an FM radio staple, as shown on the Triple M Essential Countdown for 2006 where "I'll Be Gone" came in at #331.

== Track listing ==
All tracks written by Mike Rudd according to APRA.

1. "I'll Be Gone" - 3:28
2. "Launching Place Part Two" - 3:02

== Personnel ==
Spectrum members

- Mark Kennedy – drums
- Lee Neale – keyboards
- Bill Putt – bass guitar
- Mike Rudd – vocals, lead guitar, harmonica

Recording details

- Producer – Howard Gable

== Sources ==
- The Encyclopedia of Australian Rock And Pop - Ian McFarlane
- Who's Who of Australian Rock - Compiled by Chris Spencer, Zbig Nowara and Paul McHenry
- Noel McGrath's Encyclopedia of Rock & Pop - Noel McGrath
- Top 40 Research: 1956-1977 - Jim Barnes, Fred Dyer & Hank B. Facer
- Four Triple M
