= Cam-Pact =

Australian musical group

- Also known as: The Camp Act
- Origin: Melbourne, Victoria, Australia
- Genres: Soul, psychedelic pop
- Years active: 1967–1970
- Labels: Festival, Missing Link
- Spinoffs: Sundown; Company Caine; The Dingoes
- Spinoff of: Roadrunners; Delta Set; Eighteenth Century Quartet
- Past members: Mark Barnes, Keith Glass, John Pugh, Chris Stockley, Bob Lloyd (aka Bob Tregilgus), Greg Cook, Trevor Courtney, Chris Löfvén, Russell Smith, Bill Blissett, Ray Arnott, Cliff Edwards

Cam-Pact was an Australian soul and psychedelic pop band which formed in April 1967. Originally they performed as The Camp Act but soon changed to Cam-Pact (or CamPact). Although little known outside Melbourne at the time, the various lineups of the group featured a number of young Melbourne musicians who went on to become significant figures on the Australian music scene, including Ray Arnott, Keith Glass, Chris Löfvén, Russell Smith, Robert Lloyd, Chris Stockley and Bill Blissett. Cam-Pact issued five singles and three extended plays on Festival Records before disbanding in March 1970.

== History ==
Cam-Pact were formed in Melbourne in April 1967 with a line up of Mark Barnes on bass guitar (ex-Moppa Blues, Roadrunners, Delta Set); Keith Glass on vocals and guitar (Rising Sons, Eighteenth Century Quartet); John Pugh on guitar, vocals and autoharp (Roadrunners, Delta Set, Eighteenth Century Quartet); Chris Stockley on guitar (Roadrunners, Delta Set); and Bob Lloyd (aka Bob Tregilgus) on drums. Originally named The Camp Act but, as that was "too outrageous", they soon changed to Cam-Pact. Initially they performed soul music in the Stax Records and Tamla-Motown mould. By 1968 Greg Cook, on organ and guitar, had replaced Pugh; and Trevor Courtney had replaced Lloyd on drums.

In March 1968 they issued their debut single, "Something Easy", on Festival Records followed by a four-track extended play of the same name. The track was written by Glass. Their second single, "Drawing Room", appeared in May and was also written by Glass. It was followed by a third single, "Good Good Feelin'", in September, which was co-written by Cook and Courtney. Late that year Barnes left and Glass took up bass guitar. The group issued a fourth single, "Potion of Love", in June 1969. Australian musicologist, Ian McFarlane, described these singles as "fine examples of late 1960s psychedelic pop".

By mid-1969, Glass had left to join the cast of Hair in Sydney, and Stockley left to join Axiom, and they were replaced by Chris Löfvén on bass guitar and Russell Smith on guitar, respectively. The group issued a second EP, Cam-Pact / Pastoral Symphony, with two tracks by Cam-Pact and two by label mates, Pastoral Symphony, which were a studio ensemble. Soon after, Cook was replaced in Cam-Pact by Bill Blissett on organ and vocals. In September that year, they released another single, "Zoom Zoom Zoom", and an EP of that name.

Early in 1970 Ray Arnott (ex-Chelsea Set, Browns) replaced Courtney on drums and Cliff Edwards replaced Löfvén on bass guitar. They toured to Sydney with Matt Taylor guesting on lead vocals (ex-Wild Cherries). A three-piece line up of Arnott, Edwards and Smith continued until March 1970 before the trio formed Company Caine with Gulliver Smith on lead vocals and Jeremy Noone on saxophone.

=== Afterwards ===
Ray Arnott played in a number of major Australian groups: he replaced founding drummer Mark Kennedy in Spectrum and played with them from 1971 until the group disbanded in 1973; this was followed by a brief stint in the short-lived "supergroup" Mighty Kong (which included former Cam-Pact/Co. Caine guitarist Russell Smith and former Daddy Cool members Ross Wilson and Ross Hannaford. This was followed by stints with The Dingoes (1973–1976), various solo projects (1978–80), Cold Chisel (1983–84) and Jimmy Barnes Band (1984–85). In 1969, Glass scored the role of Berger in the original Australian stage production of Hair, and performed on the award-winning original cast recording. After leaving that production, in the early 1970s (with David Pepperell), he founded the pioneering Melbourne import record store "Archie & Jughead". In 1977 Glass established a new store and record label, Missing Link, which re-issued Cam-Pact material including a compilation album, Psychedelic Pop 'n' Soul 1967-69 (October 2002) alongside many other notable releases, including the earliest recordings by The Go-Betweens and The Birthday Party. Chris Löfvén became a film maker, creating pioneering Australian "film clips" (music videos) for Daddy Cool and Spectrum; he also directed a feature film, Oz (1976), alongside his continuing music work (often with Keith Glass). Russell Smith co-founded progressive rockers Company Caine (1970–75) and was also (with Arnott) a member of the short-lived Mighty Kong. Stockley was a founding member of early Australian "supergroup" Axiom (1969–71) and The Dingoes (1973–1978, 2009–present). Robert Lloyd went on to study and teach music and become a successful composer, poet, songwriter and recording artist.

After leaving Cam-Pact, Bob Lloyd (aka Tregilgus) was in Carnival, Extradition and then Forest, before establishing a successful career as a composer. John Pugh joined a number of different groups including James Taylor Move, The News, The Avengers, Healing Force, Baiyana, Silversun, Ray Burton Nightflyers and the Renée Geyer Band. In 1970 Barnes and Glass were both in country rockers, Sundown. Chris Stockley was a founding member of rock group, Axiom (1969–71) and country rockers, The Dingoes (1973–1978, 2009–present); as well as a range of other bands. After leaving Company Caine, Ray Arnott joined Spectrum (1971–73), then The Dingoes (1973–1976) with Stockley, various solo projects (1978–80) and eventually was in Cold Chisel (1983–84) and Jimmy Barnes Band (1984-85). Chris Löfvén was a film maker and in 1971 he generated music videos for Spectrum's "I'll Be Gone" and Daddy Cool's "Eagle Rock"; he also directed a feature film, Oz (1976).

In 1977 Glass, with David Pepperell, created Missing Link Records and one of their first releases was a four-track EP by Cam-Pact, Living in the '60s. In October 2002 Glass oversaw his label's release of a Cam-Pact compilation album, Psychedelic Pop 'n' Soul 1967-69.

Mark Barnes died in August 2014.

== Discography ==
=== Albums ===
- Psychedelic Pop 'n' Soul 1967-69 – (October 2002, Missing Link Records)

=== Extended plays ===
- Something Easy – (1968, Festival Records)
- Cam-Pact / Pastoral Symphony – (1969, Festival Records)
- Zoom Zoom Zoom – (1969, Festival Records)
- Living in the '60s – (1977, Missing Link Records)

=== Singles ===
- "Something Easy" – (1968)
- "Drawing Room" – (1968)
- "Good Good Feelin'" – (1968)
- "Potion of Love" – (1969)
- "Zoom Zoom Zoom" – (1969)
