= Mike Rudd =

New Zealand musician (born 1945)

- Rudd in 2009

Background information
- Also known as: My Crudd
- Born: Michael David Rudd; 15 June 1945 (age 81); Christchurch, New Zealand
- Genres: Progressive rock, blues
- Occupations: Musician, songwriter, producer
- Instruments: Vocals, guitar, harmonica, recorder, bass, keyboard
- Years active: 1960s–present
- Labels: Harvest, EMI, Mushroom, Rare Vision, Volcano
- Website: https://www.mikeruddbillputt.com

Michael David Rudd (born 15 June 1945) is a New Zealand-born musician and composer who has been based in Australia since the mid 1960s, and who was the leader of Australian progressive rock bands Spectrum and Ariel in the 1970s.

== Biography ==
Michael David Rudd was born in Christchurch, New Zealand. His first major group was the Chants R&B. The group came to Australia and settled in Melbourne in 1966, but broke up soon afterwards. Rudd then joined The Party Machine led by Ross Wilson and Ross Hannaford, who later formed Daddy Cool.

After Party Machine split up in late 1969, Rudd formed his own group, Spectrum, one of Australia's first progressive rock groups. This also marked the beginning of his long association with bassist Bill Putt. Spectrum released four LPs and several 7" singles, including their national No. 1 hit single I'll Be Gone, which has remained one of the best-known songs of the period, and the first Australian rock double album, Milesago. The group also worked under the pseudonym Indelible Murtceps and recorded one LP under that name.

After Spectrum split in April 1973, Rudd and Putt formed a new group, Ariel. Along with keyboard player John Mills they joined forces with two leading Sydney musicians, guitarist Tim Gaze and drummer Nigel Macara from the progressive band, Tamam Shud. They released one successful LP, A Strange Fantastic Dream, in December 1973, but Gaze and Macara left the band soon after it was recorded.

In early 1974, Rudd and Putt began work on an extended concept piece, The Jellabad Mutant, and began rehearsing the music with drummer John Lee, ex-The Dingoes. Lee then brought in a friend, lead guitarist Harvey James, and this arrangement eventually coalesced into the second line-up of Ariel. They recorded a full-length demo tape of the planned LP, called The Jellabad Mutant, and presented it to their record label EMI, but to their surprise it was rejected.

However, by this time the band had gained some critical praise in the United Kingdom, thanks in part to leading disc jockey John Peel, and this led EMI's parent office in London to invite the group to record their next album at Abbey Road Studios. However, the rejection of the Mutant album left the band with no new material, and when they arrived in London they discovered that EMI were expecting the line-up that had recorded the first LP. Rudd hastily wrote a number of new songs, but to complete the LP they were forced to fall back on Rudd's back-catalogue, recording new versions of several Spectrum/Murtceps songs. The resulting album, Rock'n'Roll Scars, was mixed by the EMI recording engineer Geoff Emerick, who had worked with The Beatles.

In January 1975, Ariel was expanded to a five-piece with the addition of New Zealand singer-songwriter-guitarist Glyn Mason. This line-up recorded only one single and lasted until early 1976. Lead guitarist Harvey James left to join chart-topping Australian pop band Sherbet in March, (he was replaced by keyboardist Tony Slavich) and drummer John Lee quit to join English band, Dirty Tricks, during Ariel's second visit to the UK in April. He was briefly replaced by Nigel Macara, who quit again in October 1976, to be replaced by Iain McLennan.

Ariel continued to record and perform until July 1977, when they announced their break-up; they performed their farewell concert at the Dallas Brooks Hall in Melbourne on 31 August 1977; the show was recorded and later released on two LP's: Aloha; then Ariel Live!!-More From Before.

After Ariel, Rudd moved into promotion and production for a time. He produced the debut album for Newcastle bands Daniel and Jab and demos for Jane Clifton (ex-Melbourne band Stiletto).

Rudd and Putt later formed a succession of groups, in the 1980s — Mike Rudd's Instant Replay, Mike Rudd & The Heaters (both also with Tony Slavich) and the more electronically oriented W.H.Y. (Weird Harold and You), a drummer-less trio comprising Rudd, Putt and John Moon and featuring Weird Harold, an early but cantankerous drum-machine—but none achieved the same level of success as Spectrum or Ariel.

Although Rudd was forced to withdraw from performing for several years due to the illness and subsequent death of his wife Helen, Rudd and Putt sustained an enduring musical partnership, including reunions of Spectrum during the 1980s, and a duo album in 1996, Living on a Volcano. A new three-piece incarnation of Spectrum, with drummer Peter 'Robbo' Robertson, debuted in the late 1990s as Spectrum Play The Blues with a CD Spill, which took them back to their musical roots. Ariel also reformed for occasional gigs with varying line-ups, including a final reunion of the 'Mark II' line-up with Harvey James and John Lee, which took place not long before Lee's untimely death in July 1998.

Rudd, Putt and Robertson continued to perform and record as Spectrum, with occasional help from keyboardist Daryl Roberts, until Putt's death in Strathewen on 7 August 2013, ending an enduring 44 year partnership. Spectrum now continued as Mike Rudd with Broc O'Connor (bass), Peter 'Robbo' Robertson (percussion) and Daryl Roberts (keyboards).

Rudd's entire back-catalogue was re-released on Spotify and iTunes in August 2015.

== Discography ==
=== Albums ===
Title	Details
The Unrealist (as Mike Rudd and the Heaters)	Released: 1982; Label: Mushroom Records (L-37711)
Living On a Volcano	Released: 1995; Label: Volcano Records (VR001)

=== See also ===
- Spectrum (band)
- Indelible Murtceps
- Ariel (band)

== Awards and nominations ==
=== Go-Set Pop Poll ===
The Go-Set Pop Poll was coordinated by teen-oriented pop music newspaper, Go-Set and was established in February 1966 and conducted an annual poll during 1966 to 1972 of its readers to determine the most popular personalities.

Year	Nominee / work	Award	Result
1972	himself	Best Songwriter	4th
