= Ariel (Australian band) =

Australian progressive rock band (1973–1977)

- Origin: Melbourne, Victoria, Australia
- Genres: Progressive rock, pub rock, pop rock
- Years active: 1973–1977
- Labels: EMI, Harvest, CBS, Image, Avenue, RareVision
- Past members: (see below)
- Website: http://www.mikeruddbillputt.com

Ariel were an Australian progressive rock band fronted by Mike Rudd and Bill Putt, who formed the band in 1973 after the breakup of their previous group Spectrum (which also performed under the alter-ego Indelible Murtceps). The original Ariel line-up was Mike Rudd (guitar, harmonica, vocals), Bill Putt (bass), Tim Gaze (guitar), John Mills (keyboards) and Nigel Macara (drums). Gaze and Macara were recruited from seminal Australian progressive rock band Tamam Shud. The band released three studio albums and two live albums between 1973 and 1977, during which there were several line-up changes, with Rudd and Putt the only permanent members. Other members of Ariel included guitarists Harvey James and Glyn Mason and keyboard player Tony Slavich.

== History ==
=== 1973-1975: A Strange Fantastic Dream & Rock'n Roll Scars ===
Their debut album A Strange Fantastic Dream, produced by Peter Dawkins was released in Australia on EMI and in the UK on progressive label Harvest in 1974, and reached No. 17 on the Australian charts in February 1974. It included their most successful single "Jamaican Farewell", which peaked at No. 34, its success hampered by lack of airplay, especially in Sydney, although it impressed the industry enough to win the FACB "Single of the Year". According to the liner notes for the CD release of the album, there were calls to ban the LP because of its psychedelic cover artwork by Stephen Nelson, which included a figure holding a hypodermic syringe. Airplay for the LP was further hindered by the banning of three songs (the darkly satirical "Confessions of a Psychotic Cowpoke", "Miracle Man" and "Chicken Shit") by the commercial radio industry's self-regulatory body in Australia, the FACB.

Critical reception to A Strange Fantastic Dream was glowing. One particularly important outcome for the group was that EMI International's President, Allan Davies, who fell in love with the album saying "You know, Peter (Dawkins), I can't recall ever hearing a song about necrophilia!" Renowned British DJ John Peel also picked up both album and single and "said some really nice things about both of them". The remastered re-release of A Strange Fantastic Dream was described as "extraordinary" by The Sydney Morning Herald in September 2002.

Gaze and Nigel Macara left the band abruptly after a trip to Perth in early 1974, so Rudd and Putt began work on an ambitious science-fiction themed concept work entitled The Jellabad Mutant, which they hoped to record. For rehearsals they brought in drummer John Lee (later a member of The Dingoes) who in turn brought in Harvey James, thereby establishing the second lineup of the group, which lasted until early 1975. Ariel recorded a full demo of The Jellabad Mutant and presented it to their label EMI, but it was rejected. On the strength of the first LP, EMI in Britain had arranged recording time for the group at their famous Abbey Road Studios in London, but the rejection of The Jellabad Mutant by EMI Australia forced Ariel to fall back on reworked material from Rudd's previous group Spectrum, supplemented by new songs hastily written by Rudd for the sessions. Despite the problems surrounding the recording, the resultant album Rock & Roll Scars was released in March 1975 is now regarded as one of the best Australian albums of the period, although it failed to make any significant commercial impression. It was mixed in the UK by Geoff Emerick, who worked on many of the later recordings by The Beatles, and produced by Peter Dawkins.

Concerning the rejection of the Jellabad Mutant project, Rudd later said "It's interesting to speculate what might have happened had we been allowed to proceed with the Mutant with an intact budget EMI slashed the budget for Rock'n Roll Scars adding to the pressure and with the time to reflect and be creative with the raw material you hear in the demos. I regret not going in to bat for it at the time. We had a fabulous opportunity with the best technical assistance any band could have wanted. But I didn't sell the dream, even to myself."

After returning to Australia in early 1975 Ariel added a fifth member, singer-guitarist Glyn Mason, formerly of Chain, Jeff St John & Copperwine and Home. The five-piece version of the band performed for several months but recorded only one single, although unofficial live recordings of this lineup have survived. It was during this period that Rudd introduced Dawkins to newly arrived New Zealand band Dragon. Dawkins (who had by then moved to CBS Records) immediately signed Dragon and went on to produce a string of Australian hit albums and singles with them in the late 1970s.

=== 1976-1980: Goodnight Fiona and break up ===
After the expiration of their EMI contract the group signed with CBS Records for their third album Goodnight Fiona, which was released in September 1976. Harvey James quit Ariel abruptly later in 1976 after he was invited to join leading Australian pop group Sherbet, where he replaced founding member Clive Shakespeare. James' first recording with Sherbet was their Australian No. 1 and UK Top 5 hit "Howzat". James was replaced in Ariel by keyboard player Tony Slavich.

Macara left again in October 1976 and was replaced by another former Richard Clapton Band member, Iain McLennan. The single "Disco Dilemma" was released in April 1977, just before expiration of their CBS contract, after which they signed to local independent label Image Records. They recorded the single "It's Only Love" for their new label; the song featured lead vocals from its writer Glyn Mason.

Ariel announced its breakup in July 1977 and just before their CBS contract expired, the "Island Fantasy" themed farewell concert was staged on Sunday 21 August 1977 at the Dallas Brooks Hall in Melbourne. The show was recorded and released over the two albums Ariel Aloha in November 1977 and Live - More from Before in 1978. These two albums were subsequently reissued in 1980 as Ariel Live In Concert.

== Band members ==
- Mike Rudd − guitar, harmonica, lead and backing vocals (1973−8/1977, ex-Spectrum)
- Tim Gaze − guitar, lead and backing vocals (1973−4/1974, ex-Kahvas Jute, Tamam Shud)
- Harvey James − guitar, backing vocals (8/1974−3/1976)
- Glyn Mason − guitar, lead and backing vocals (1/1975−8/1977, ex-Chain, Jeff St John & Copperwine, Home)
- John Mills − keyboards (1973−4/1974, ex-Spectrum)
- Tony Slavich − keyboards, backing vocals (1976−8/1977, ex-Richard Clapton Band)
- Bill Putt − bass (1973−8/1977, ex-Spectrum)
- Nigel Macara − drums, backing vocals (1973−4/1974, 4-10/1976, ex-Tamam Shud)
- John Lee − drums, backing vocals (4/1974−4/1976)
- Iain McLennan − drums, backing vocals (10/1976−8/1977, ex-Richard Clapton Band)

== Discography ==
=== Studio albums ===
List of albums, with selected chart positions
Title	Album details	Peak chart positions
Title	Album details	AUS
A Strange Fantastic Dream	Released: December 1973; Format: LP; Label: EMI (EMC 2503)	17
Rock & Roll Scars	Released: March 1975; Format: LP; Label: Harvest (SHVL 614)	50
Goodnight Fiona	Released: September 1976; Format: LP; Label: CBS (SBP 234867)	36

=== Live albums ===
List of albums, with selected chart positions
Title	Album details	Peak chart positions
Title	Album details	AUS
Aloha Ariel	Released: November 1977; Format: LP; Label: Image (ILP 775)	35
Live! More from Before	Released: 1978; Format: LP; Label: Image (ILP 795)	-

=== Singles ===
List of singles, with selected chart positions
Year	Title	Peak chart positions	Album
Year	Title	AUS	Album
1973	"Jamaican Farewell" / "Red Hot Momma"	66	A Strange Fantastic Dream
1974	"Yeah Tonight" / "(I Am the) Laughing Man"	-	Rock and Roll Scars
1975	"Keep On Dancing" / "I'll Be Gone"	-	Rock and Roll Scars
1975	"I'll Be Going" / "Rock and Roll Scars"	-	Rock and Roll Scars
1975	"I'll Take You High" / "I Can't Say What I Mean"	62	
1976	"I Can Do Anything" / "Cypherland Blues"	92	Goodnight Fiona
1977	"Disco Dilemma" / "How Do You Do It?"	82	Aloha
1977	"It's Only Love" / "It's Time we Said Our Goodbyes"	62	Ariel Live!! - More from Before
