= Central Hall, Melbourne =

Heritage building in Victoria, Australia

Central Hall
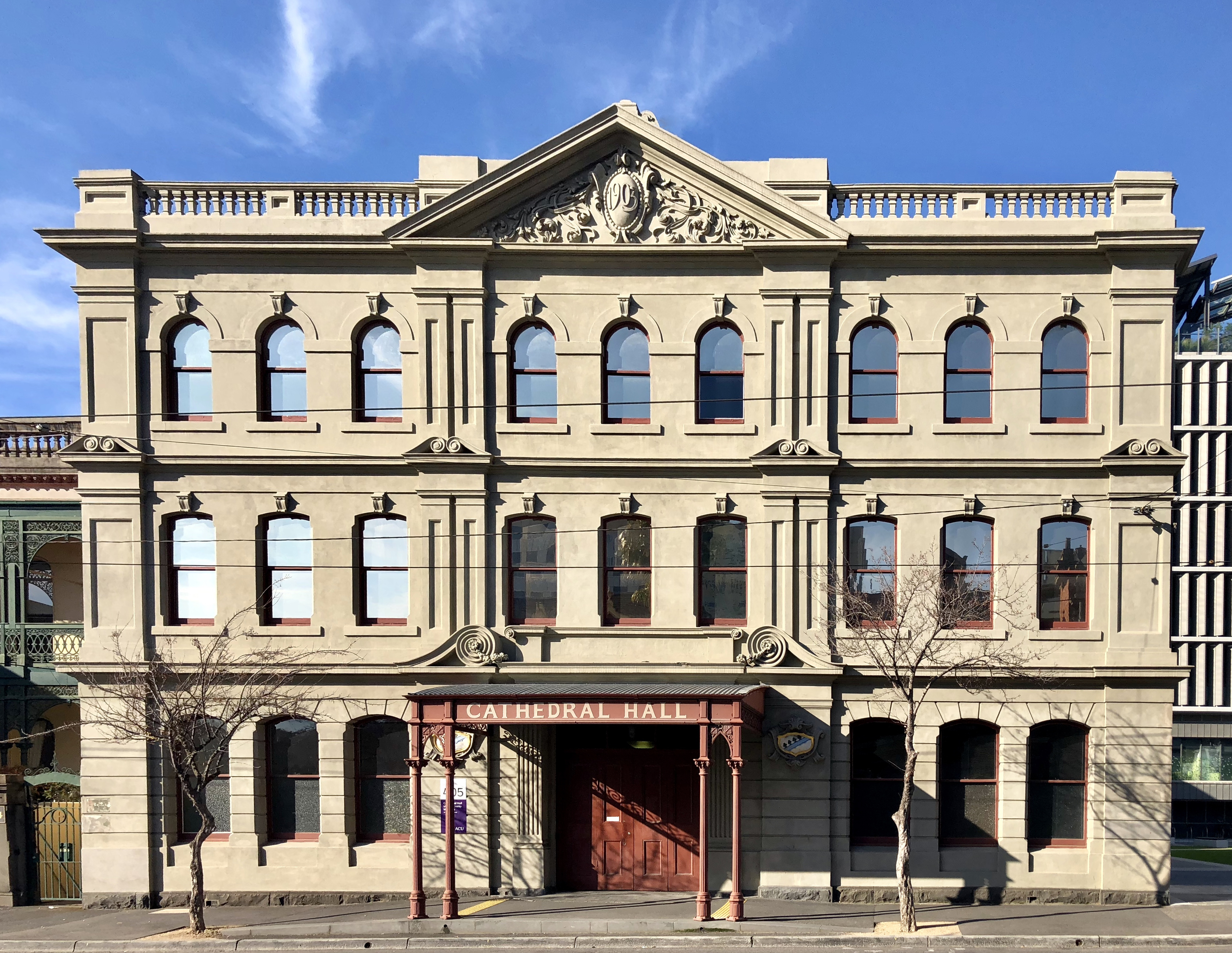
- The hall in 2018

- Location of the house in Greater Metropolitan Melbourne
- Former names: Exhibition Boot Factory; Cathedral Hall; TF Much Ballroom
- Alternative names: Cathedral Hall

General information
- Type: Religious hall (1904–1960s); Live music venue (1970–1974); University building (since 2000–)
- Architectural style: Victorian Free Classical
- Location: Brunswick Street, Fitzroy, Melbourne, City of Yarra, Victoria, Australia
- Coordinates: 37°48′25″S 144°58′37″E
- Current tenants: Australian Catholic University
- Owner: Melbourne Catholic Archdiocese

Victorian Heritage Register
- Official name: Cathedral Hall
- Type: Registered place
- Designated: 14 February 2002
- Reference no.: VHR H1967
- Heritage overlay no.: HO347
- Category: Community Facilities

The Central Hall, also known by its former name, Cathedral Hall, and, for a short period, as the T. F. Much Ballroom or the Too Fucking Much Ballroom, is a university building located on Brunswick Street in Fitzroy, an inner-city suburb of Melbourne, in the City of Yarra, in Victoria, Australia. Built in 1873 as the Exhibition Boot Factory, the site was repurposed by the Melbourne Catholic Archdiocese in 1904 for church and education purposes, used as a live music venue during the 1970s, and then repurposed as a university lecture theatre in the 1990s, as a centrepiece of Australian Catholic University's St. Patrick's Campus. It once held a similar role within Melbourne's Roman Catholic (and predominantly Irish) community, from the time the hall and adjoining clubrooms were opened in 1904.

Built on the traditional lands of the Wurundjeri people, the hall was added to the Victorian Heritage Register on 14 February 2002 in recognition of its historical and architectural significance.

== Building of Cathedral Hall ==
The first planning for the Catholic hall took place in 1901. Archbishop Thomas Carr, and the Dean Phelan, made several announcements to their parishioners at Mass and in parish meetings relating about a proposed hall. At this stage, the hall was to be built on the grounds of St. Patrick's Cathedral, facing north on Albert Street. By October 1902 this idea had been abandoned since the hall would have obscured the view of the cathedral from Albert Street (heading west to the cathedral).

On 8 November of the same year, Archbishop Carr announced at Saturday evening Mass that the Archdiocese had acquired a property on Brunswick Street, a former boot factory built in 1873, which had been designed by architects Reed & Barnes. The property had come at a 'very moderate' cost of £4,200. The project involved refurbishing the factory building as clubrooms, with a large new hall built to the rear, designed by the same architects who had done the factory, by then known as Reed Tappin & Smart.

The foundation stone of the hall was laid by the Archbishop at a ceremony on Sunday 26 April 1903. The clubrooms in the old factory structure were opened in June, but the hall itself was finished about a month behind schedule, and was not able to host the St. Patrick's night celebrations on 17 March 1904 as first hoped. Instead, the grand opening took place on Sunday, 10 April, with over 2,000 people crowding the hall (which had a capacity of 1,100).

The relatively austere composition of the factory front to Brunswick Street was transformed into a more elaborate yet restrained and dignified facade for the new purpose. The elaborate plasterwork of the hall ceiling, proscenium and balcony was seen by contemporaries as an aesthetic triumph. The plasterwork described as 'in the German Renaissance style' was repainted in shades of sage green, cream and buff in 1913.

Central Hall has been put to many different uses since it opened in April 1904. During the 1920s the hall played host to jazz nights, and in the postwar period, Cathedral Hall hosted Italian dances each Sunday night for many years.

== Live music venue ==
Central Hall (as it became known from the 1960s) was repurposed as a live music venue, known as the T. F. Much Ballroom or Too Fucking Much Ballroom from 1970 to 1974. The venue was promoted by Bani McSpedden and John Pinder, initially to raise money for a Carlton youth club. Its successors were Much More Ballroom and Stoned Again. Its monthly events typically featured long concert-style performances, with multiple musical acts on the bill, interspersed with comedy, poetry readings, theatrical, dance and novelty performances. The events developed to become major Melbourne music and cultural occurrences and included concerts by Sons of the Vegetal Mother and its offshoot, Daddy Cool, Spectrum and its offshoot, Indelible Murtceps, Midnight Oil, and Tamam Shud. Solo artists included the wizard-like magician, Jeff Krozier (Crozier), the blues and soul singer, Wendy Saddington, and Australia's first synthesiser performer, Steve Dunstan.

In an interview, Pinder described the hall:

" …it belonged to the Catholic Church. And in fact, it was the sort of hall for the Catholic Cathedral. And I think they had no idea what we were up to. But I used pay the rent to whatever they call the office of the Archbishop of Melbourne."

— John Pinder.

By the late 1980s, Central Hall had become a venue for Victorian state boxing matches and title fights.

== Academic use ==
The Archdiocese of Melbourne granted the use of Central Hall to the Australian Catholic University and it was the location for the opening of St. Patrick's campus on 28 July 2000. The hall is regularly used for all of ACU's theatrical activities, while the Recital Room, formerly the Supper Room, with the hall also accommodates the university's music students, and other classes when necessary. Central Hall was restored in the early 2000s.

As of March 2012, the original ballroom was used for some university functions.

== See also ==
- Architecture of Melbourne
- List of places on the Victorian Heritage Register in the City of Yarra
