= The Pink Finks =

Australian pop/R&B band

- Origin: Melbourne, Victoria, Australia
- Genres: Pop, R&B
- Years active: 1965–1967
- Past members: David Cameron; Rick Dalton; Michael Edwards; Richard Franklin; Ross Hannaford; Chris Kinman; Leigh Lansdown; Jimmy Niven; Geoff Ratz; Ross Wilson

The Pink Finks were an Australian pop and R&B band of the mid-1960s. Based in Melbourne, the group is most notable for being the first in the series of bands that featured Ross Wilson and Ross Hannaford, which culminated in the hugely successful Daddy Cool.

== History ==
The Pink Finks formed in early 1965 when 16-year-old R&B fanatic Ross Wilson joined forces with Rick Dalton and Ross Hannaford's schoolboy outfit The Fauves, which played mainly covers of The Shadows and The Ventures. They were a part-time band, since the members were all still at school at the time. Hannaford, who was only 14 when the band formed, was often driven to concerts by his mother, and had to be sneaked in and out of the licensed venues they played at because he was underage. Money was short and Hannaford played on a low cost acoustic guitar fitted with a Moody sound hole pick-up (without controls) through a Burns Tri-Sonic amplifier provided by Wilson. Inspired by the onslaught of English groups like The Rolling Stones, The Pretty Things, and The Yardbirds, the young band's repertoire was chiefly R&B and blues covers.

David Cameron replaced original rhythm guitarist Rick Dalton in early 1965, with Dalton later joining Running Jumping Standing Still, which included Andy Anderson and Doug Ford, both formerly of The Missing Links and Ian Robinson on drums.

The Pink Finks released four singles during their brief career; their first, released on their own Mojo label, was a raunchy version of The Kingsmen's "Louie Louie" and it gave them an early taste of success when it became a local hit (#16) in Melbourne in June 1965. These were followed by covers of The Shirelles' "Untie Me", Howlin' Wolf's "Back Door Man" and Spencer Davis Group's "It Hurts Me So".

Franklin, Cameron and Ratz left to go to university in early 1966. It appears from the information in Who's Who of Australian Rock that they were replaced, by Kinman (bass), Lansdown (drums), and Niven (keyboards). Michael Edwards was added on trumpet and sax in August 1966. Jimmy Niven was later a member of the Captain Matchbox Whoopee Band (1973–76) and The Sports (1976–80).

Richard Franklin later became a successful feature film director; his Australian credits include The True Story of Eskimo Nell, Fantasm, Roadgames and Patrick. After moving to Hollywood he directed Psycho II, Cloak & Dagger, Link and FX2: The Deadly Art of Illusion. In the 1990s, he returned to Australia where he directed Hotel Sorrento, Brilliant Lies and Visitors, before he died of cancer in 2007.

David Cameron graduated from NIDA and became an actor, beginning with a role in the ABC's Bellbird, in 1969 and since appeared in string of Australian TV series, miniseries and feature film appearances, including Against the Wind, Dawn!, Water under the Bridge (for which he received a Logie nomination), My First Wife and Mad Max. In 1995, he turned to directing television, commercials and corporate documentaries, including Stingers, SeaChange, Good Guys Bad Guys, State Coroner, Fergus McPhail, The Wayne Manifesto (for which he won an AFI award), Life and Dogwoman. Cameron is currently a teacher at The Australian Film & Television Academy (TAFTA).

Wilson and Hannaford moved on to notable bands such as The Party Machine, Sons of the Vegetal Mother, Daddy Cool, and Mighty Kong.

Chris Kinman returned to Brisbane in the late 1960s and turned to making guitars. In 1996 he founded his own pickup boutique, Kinman Guitar Electrix.

Leigh Lansdown and UK arriviste Duncan Fry formed local band "The Harris Tweed Band" in 1965 which is still performing mainly in Melbourne's southern suburbs.

== Personnel ==
- David Cameron – guitar
- Rick Dalton – guitar, vocals
- Michael Edwards – saxophone, trumpet (1966)
- Richard Franklin – drums
- Ross Hannaford – vocals, guitar
- Chris Kinman – bass (1966)
- Leigh Lansdown – drums (1966)
- Jimmy Niven – keyboards (1966)
- Geoff Ratz – bass
- Ross Wilson – vocals, guitar

== Discography ==
=== Singles ===
- "Untie Me" (Joe South)/ "Nowhere to Run" (1965) [In INS2451]
- "Back Door Man" / "Somethin' Else" (1965) [In INS2505]
- "Louie Louie" / "Got Love If You Want It" (Slim Harpo) (1965) [Mojo 001]
- "You're Good For Me" (Johnny Chester)/ "Comin' Home Baby" (1966) [W&G S2625]
- "It Hurts Me So" (Steve Winwood) / "Drop Down Mama" (1987) [From The Vault FTV2]

=== EP's ===
- In Group (1965) [In E2558]
- Louie Louie (December 1980) [Raven RV06] – Louie, Louie / Back Door Man, Comin' Home / You're Good For Me / Rub My Root / Somethin' Else / Untie Me
