= Stage Door Witchdoctors =

Studio album by Chants R&B
- Released: August 15, 2000
- Recorded: Melbourne; Australia
- Genre: Rhythm and Blues
- Label: Bacchus

Professional ratings
Review scores
Source	Rating
Allmusic	3/5 stars

Stage Door Witchdoctors was, until 2008, Chants R&B's only full-length album. Released in 2000, it is a compilation of live performances and studio singles. Most of the tracks were later included on Chants R&B, a vinyl album on Norton (2008), along with some tracks not included on Stage Door Witchdoctors.

== Track listing ==
1. "Neighbour Neighbour" Meaux - 2:34
2. "I'm Your Witchdoctor" Mayall - 2:05
3. "Mystic Eyes" Morrison - 2:54
4. "Come See Me" Jackson, Tubbs - 2:31
5. "Early in the Morning" Traditional - 1:53
6. "I Want Her" Butler, Courtney - 2:40
7. "I've Been Loving You Too Long" Butler, Redding - 2:51
8. "I Forgot How It's Been" Courtney, Hansen, Rudd, Tomlin - 2:24
9. "One Two Brown Eyes" Morrison - 2:48
10. "When I Find Out" Mayall - 2:38
11. "That's the Way It's Got to Be" - 2:14
12. "Don't Bring Me Down" May, Taylor - 2:03
13. "Land of a Thousand Dances" Garcia - 2:29
14. "Interview With Jim Tomlin" - 9:49
