= Gulliver Smith =

- Birth name: Kevin Gullifer Smith
- Also known as: Kevin Gullifer Hopkins-Smith, Gullifer Smith, Little Gulliver
- Born: Melbourne, Victoria, Australia
- Died: 12 November 2014 Sydney, New South Wales, Australia
- Genres: R&B, soul, progressive rock
- Occupation(s): Musician, songwriter
- Instrument: Vocals
- Years active: 1961–2003
- Labels: WEA/Reprise, Dragon/Larrikin

Kevin Gullifer Hopkins-Smith (born Kevin Gullifer Smith; c. 1950 – November 2014), who performed as Little Gulliver and Gulliver Smith (also styled as Gullifer Smith), was an Australian singer and songwriter from the early 1960s to mid-2000s. He was the front man and founding mainstay vocalist of Company Caine. In 1976 he and Ross Wilson co-wrote "A Touch of Paradise" for Wilson's group, Mondo Rock, which appeared on their third album, Nuovo Mondo (July 1982). It was covered by John Farnham on his album, Whispering Jack (October 1986), and was issued as its third single in February 1987, which reached the top 30 on the Kent Music Report Singles Chart.

Gulliver Smith died on 12 November 2014 from kidney failure, and was survived by his wife Stephanie Hopkins-Smith (née Hopkins) and their three sons. According to Australian musicologist, Ian McFarlane, "Smith drew on vintage rock'n'roll, Professor Longhair-styled New Orleans R&B, psychedelia and soul for inspiration. He was known for his outrageous stage act, which incorporated an inventive free-form approach and much evangelist-styled ad-libbing. Later on, he added a satirical Zappaesque component to his on-stage banter and lyrics."

== Biography ==
Kevin Gullifer Smith (later Kevin Gullifer Hopkins-Smith) was born in the 1950s and was a child performer in the early 1960s in Melbourne, covering tracks by artists from the previous decade. Occasionally he was a guest singer for local bands, the Thunderbirds and the Lincolns. Smith remembered his early performances "I remember listening to gospel records where people would start preaching in the middle of the song. A lot of soul music would have the guys interrupt the singing to talk about their broken heart, so that gave me the idea. I used to imitate Johnny Ray when I was nine or ten. He used to cry on stage."

In 1965 he fronted Little Gulliver and the Children, a R&B and soul band, on lead vocals with Ian McCausland on guitar and Lawrie Byrnes on drums. Smith explained "my manager changed my name from the original spelling of Gullifer, which is Welsh, to Gulliver." They issued two singles, "Short Fat Fannie" (cover version of Larry William's 1957 single) in September, and "No Money Down" (1955 original by Chuck Berry) in March 1966. A self-titled extended play appeared in September 1966. Smith would interrupt live performances of songs to deliver a monologue, "some little vignette that was quite unrelated."

Late in 1966 the group disbanded and Smith relocated to Sydney: the group was not getting enough work and Smith explained "I used to do the TV show Its all Happening quite a bit in Sydney and one time I just decided to stay here." From the EP their track, "I Was Bewitched", later appeared on a various artists compilation album, Pretty Ugly (1998).

In Sydney in 1967 Smith joined Dr Kandy's Third Eye, a psychedelic soul, R&B band, with Mal Capewell on saxophone, Arthur Eizenberg on bass guitar, Zane Hudson on saxophone, Dave Kain on guitar (ex-Untamed), Alison McCallum on co-lead vocals, Daryl McKenzie on drums, Kevin Patterson on trumpet and Bob Walsh on organ. Smith realised "I had gone past the soul and blues area by that time and I wanted to be more creative and write more." They did not release any recordings, although Smith co-wrote tracks for the group, including "The Day Superman Got Busted". Kain later described the band to The Canberra Times' Michael Foster as "well-known and successful at the time of the psychedelic movement" and of his "being made very aware by jazz musicians, experimentation with drugs."

In 1968 Smith was fired from Dr Kandy's Third Eye and formed a jazz-blues ensemble, Noyes, with Bobby Gebert on piano, John Helman on bass guitar, Mick Lieber on guitar (ex-Python Lee Jackson) and Dave Ovenden on drums. When Helman and Lieber left, Smith and Ovenden enlisted Kain and Terry Wilkins on bass guitar to create a free-form, soul band, Time and the Forest Flower. In early 1969, after McKenzie and a horn section joined, they were renamed as A Love Supreme, but Smith left in mid-year to return to Melbourne. Australian musicologist, Ian McFarlane, felt their "radical fusion of jazz, rock and blues never really gelled."

In March 1970 Smith formed Company Caine with Ray Arnott on drums (ex-Chelsea Set, Browns, Cam-Pact), Cliff Edwards on bass guitar (ex-Cam-Pact), Jeremy Noone (aka Jeremy Kellock) on saxophone and keyboards (ex-Leo and Friends) and Russell Smith (no relation: born Russell Kinross-Smith) on guitar and vocals (ex-Cam-Pact).

McFarlane described them as "one of the most adventurous, avant-garde outfits of the day." In November 1971 they issued their first album, A Product of a Broken Reality, which included the group's version of "The Day Superman Got Busted". Smith felt that recording sessions were "great, because we had a week in the studio where we just played our repertoire and could do whatever we wanted to." McFarlane opined that it was "more expansive, more 'out there' than just about every band... [The album] remains a milestone of the early 1970s progressive rock era." They disbanded in October 1972.

Smith initially explored forming a group with former Daddy Cool members, Ross Hannaford and Ross Wilson; however, this did not eventuate. Smith then worked on his debut solo album, The Band's Alright but the Singer Is... (June 1973), with former bandmates Arthur Eizenberg, Ernie McInerny, Russell Smith, Jeremy Noone (all ex-Company Caine), Bobby Gebert (Dr Kandy's Third Eye); and new associates Dave Conners on saxophone and Mick Tulk on guitar (both ex-Lizard).

McFarlane determined that the album was "basically a Company Caine album in everything but name. It was a very entertaining album with its uptempo mix of blues, country, psychedelia and Professor Longhair-styled New Orleans R&B elements." To promote it, Smith formed the Dead End Kids in May 1973 with Conners, Noone and Tulk joined by Greg Hill on bass guitar (ex-Lizard), Greg Sheehan on drums (ex-Blackfeather) and Bruce Woodcock on piano (ex-Sons of the Vegetal Mother). In 1975 Gulliver Smith and Russell Smith reformed Company Caine with a new line up and issued the group's second album, Doctor Chop, with Wilson producing three of its tracks. Once again the group disbanded.

Smith formed Gulliver's Travels in mid-1976 with Capewell, Wayne Duncan on bass guitar (ex-Daddy Cool), Gerry Joyce on guitar, John Mills on keyboards (ex-Spectrum, Ariel) and Robert Souter on drums (ex-Lizard). In the following year Greg Lawrie (ex-Carson) replaced Joyce on guitar and Ian Mawson (ex-Company Caine, Levi Smith's Clefs) replaced Mills on keyboards. However, in 1977 Smith relocated to the United Kingdom where he founded the Gulliver Smith Band.

In about 1976 Smith and Wilson co-wrote "A Touch of Paradise" for Wilson's proposed group, Mondo Rock. Wilson later recalled, "it was the first song I wrote when I was putting together a new band that I would call Mondo Rock, and it stands out as it is far more sensitive than other songs I was writing at the time." The group struggled to record it, "We tried around three times to record it and we demoed it," their version is on the group's third album, Nuovo Mondo (July 1982).

"A Touch of Paradise" was covered by John Farnham on his album, Whispering Jack (October 1986), and was issued as its third single in February 1987, which reached the top 30 on the Kent Music Report Singles Chart. Wilson described Farnham's version, "It wasn't a huge hit, but it was one of those songs that because the album was so massive, they just kept putting songs on the radio, and that was one of them. So 10 years after it was written, John redefined what it was all about."

In 1989 Smith returned to Sydney and formed a new version of Gulliver's Travels with Steve Blau on keyboards, Allan Britton on bass guitar (ex-Dynamic Hepnotics) Andrew Reid on guitar, and Robert Souter on drums (ex-Dynamic Hepnotics). In 1996 Smith, as Gullifer, teamed with Stephanie Hopkins (his domestic partner) to release an album, Deux Poètes, on Dragon Records. McFarlane summarised that "Smith drew on vintage rock'n'roll, Professor Longhair-styled New Orleans R&B, psychedelia and soul for inspiration. He was known for his outrageous stage act, which incorporated an inventive free-form approach and much evangelist-styled ad-libbing. Later on, he added a satirical Zappaesque component to his on-stage banter and lyrics."

Gulliver Smith died on 12 November 2014 of kidney failure, "after a long illness", and was survived by his wife Stephanie Hopkins-Smith (née Hopkins) and their three sons.

== Discography ==
=== Albums ===
- The Band's Alright but the Singer Is... (June 1973)
- Deux Poètes (by Gullifer) (1996)

=== Singles ===
- "Such a Shame" (July 1973)
- "Lazy Shoe" (October 1973)
- "Don't Keep Doin' It Duke" (July 1980)
