= Ray Arnott =

- Born: Raymond Walter Arnott
- Genres: Rock and roll, progressive rock
- Occupations: Drummer; songwriter; singer; music teacher
- Instruments: Drums, vocals
- Years active: 1964–present
- Labels: Sparmac; Wizard; Sony/BMG; Liberation; Albert/EMI
- Formerly of: Spectrum; The Dingoes; Cold Chisel; The Chelsea Set; Mighty Kong; Flash and the Pan; Cheetah; Cam-Pact; Company Caine

Ray Arnott is an Australian rock drummer and singer-songwriter. He was a member of Spectrum (1970–1973), which had a number one hit with "I'll Be Gone". He played drums for The Dingoes in the 1970s and Cold Chisel in 1980s.

== Biography ==
Ray grew up in Brisbane and played with Glenn Wheatley (of the Masters Apprentices) in the Vacant Lot, and with Chelsea Set. Ray moved to Melbourne with the Chelsea Set in 1966. He left that band to join the Browns, who were the backing band for Vergil Brothers, Johnny Farnham, Colleen Hewett, Wendy Saddington, and Olivia Newton-John. Ray did a stint with Matt Taylor in the band Genesis and Gulliver Smith in Company Caine. In late 1970 he replaced original drummer Mark Kennedy in the Australian progressive rock group Spectrum and remained with them until they split in early 1973. He sang backing and lead vocals with the band, as well as drumming, and he contributed several songs to their repertoire.

Arnott left Spectrum to join Mighty Kong, a new band formed by ex-Daddy Cool members Ross Wilson and Ross Hannaford, but the new group was very short-lived and broke up soon after recording its only LP in late 1973. Ray then recorded with Rick Springfield and Phil Ochs and was produced by John Fishbach, who had worked with Stevie Wonder.

Arnott took over the drum stool from the original drummer in two of the most prominent Australian bands of the era, The Dingoes in the mid 1970s, and Cold Chisel in 1983 with whom he toured extensively and recorded the Twentieth Century album.

During the late '70s to mid '80s, Arnott served as the drummer for George Young (brother of Angus and Malcolm Young of AC/DC) and Harry Vanda doing many projects including Cheetah, John Paul Young, The Choirboys, and Flash and the Pan. Ray recorded two solo album for Alberts with Angus Young playing lead on "Rock N Roll Gal" from the album Rude Dudes, which also featured Jimmy Barnes, Ross Wilson, Pete Wells, Ace Follington, Warren Pig Morgan, Ronnie Peel, Harry Vanda, and Graham Parker's horn section.

Cold Chisel frontman Jimmy Barnes took on Arnott for his first two solo releases, the Bodyswerve album in 1984 and For the Working Class Man album in 1985. Ray toured extensively with Jimmy Barnes and co-wrote one song for the Bodyswerve album.

Ray's song "Flaming Heart" caught the attention of Jimmy Page, who recommended it to Stephen Stills. Stills recorded "Flaming Heart" for his album Right by You in 1984.

Ray now lives in the Northern Rivers of NSW and works as a youth counsellor and music therapist, and continues his songwriting and plays locally. In July 2015 Ray was interviewed by The Australian Rock Show.
