= The Dingoes =

Australian country rock band

- Origin: Melbourne, Victoria, Australia
- Genres: Country rock, R&B
- Years active: 1973–1979, 2009–present
- Labels: Mushroom, A&M
- Members: Chris Stockley; John Bois; Ashley Davies; Kerryn Tolhurst
- Past members: see Members list

The Dingoes are an Australian country rock band. They were initially active from 1973 to 1979, and reformed in 2009. Initially based in Melbourne, the band relocated to the United States from 1976. The most stable line-up comprised John Bois on bass guitar, John Lee on drums, Broderick Smith on vocals and harmonica, Chris Stockley on guitar, and Kerryn Tolhurst on guitar. Mal Logan (who provided keyboards on the first LP) on keyboards joined after Stockley was hospitalised when shot in the stomach by Melbourne drug-dealer, Dennis Allen, who was attempting to gate crash a party. The Dingoes' debut single, "Way Out West", was released in November 1973, and peaked in the top 40 of the Australian Kent Music Report singles chart. Subsequent singles were "Boy on the Run", "Smooth Sailing", and "Into the Night", which did not reach the top 50. They had three top-40 albums, The Dingoes in 1974, Five Times the Sun in 1977, and Orphans of the Storm in 1979.

On 27 August 2009, The Dingoes were inducted into the Australian Recording Industry Association (ARIA) Hall of Fame alongside Kev Carmody, Little Pattie, Mental As Anything, and John Paul Young. The Dingoes reformed in late 2009 and released the album Tracks in 2010, which was followed by a tour of Australia. The live album Live at Last followed the tour, which prompted another tour – this time without Bois, who could not get away from his day job.

== History ==
=== Previous bands ===
Kerryn Tolhurst, lead guitarist, mandolin-player, and singer-songwriter founded Adderley Smith Blues Band in 1964 in Melbourne, which was one of Australia's first authentic blues bands. Lead vocalist and harmonica-player Broderick Smith joined in 1966, both Smith and Tolhurst were conscripted into the Army as part of National Service during the Vietnam War for two years from 1968 to 1970. Smith was unable to continue with the band but Tolhurst was able to keep a line-up performing, including Joe Camilleri on saxophone in 1970. After National Service, Tolhurst formed Sundown, with singer-songwriter Keith Glass, as a country rock group, Smith briefly joined Sundown before going on to blues boogie band, Carson in 1971. After Sundown, Tolhurst joined singer-songwriter Greg Quill in his country rock group Country Radio during 1972–1973. Quill and Tolhurst co-wrote their hit singles "Gypsy Queen" and "Wintersong".

Both Carson (with Smith) and Country Radio (before Tolhurst joined) had performed at the inaugural Sunbury Pop Festival in January 1972. At the second festival in January 1973, Carson (with Smith) performed and recorded their set, including a track called "Dingo", which was released on their live album, On the Air in April. Country Radio (with Tolhurst) had also performed, and live tracks from both bands were included on the first ever Mushroom Records album, as a triple-LP, The Great Australian Rock Festival Sunbury 1973. After the 1973 festival, both Smith and Tolhurst left their respective bands. Tolhurst briefly joined Mississippi which later became Little River Band. Smith, in March, played the role of "The Father" in the Australian production of the rock opera Tommy, which was staged in Sydney and Melbourne.

Guitarist, Chris Stockley (ex-Roadrunners, Delta Set), formed psychedelic rock group Cam-Pact with Keith Glass in 1967, both had left by late 1969. Stockley joined rock group Axiom, which had top-ten hits with "Arkansas Grass" and "A Little Ray of Sunshine", before they disbanded in 1971. John Lee (ex-Sayla) had been drummer for Blackfeather from February to April 1973. John Strangio was bass guitarist for St James Infirmary and Middle Earth.

=== Formation and early years ===
The Dingoes with John Lee on drums, Broderick Smith on lead vocals and harmonica, Chris Stockley on lead guitar, John Strangio on bass guitar, and Kerryn Tolhurst on guitar and mandolin, were formed in Melbourne in April 1973. Strangio left in August and was replaced on bass guitar by John Bois, who had been a member of Melbourne '60s pop band New Dream and was later a member (with Tolhurst) of Country Radio. The Dingoes combined R&B, country and rock 'n' roll with songs that used Australian themes and imagery.

The Dingoes were an early signing to the fledgling Mushroom Records label, it issued their debut single "Way Out West" which was jointly credited to Lee, Bois, Smith, Stockley, and Tolhurst although Bois' book confirms that the song was written by Tolhurst alone. A week before the single was released Stockley received a serious gunshot wound during an incident at a party in Melbourne that resulted in a two-month stay in hospital, initially described as an 'accidental shooting', according to music historian, Ian McFarlane's Encyclopedia of Australian Rock and Pop, Stockley was shot by notorious drug dealer Dennis Allen, who was trying to gate crash the party. An eight-hour benefit concert was held for Stockley on 4 November 1973 at Leggett's Ballroom, Greville Street, Prahran. While recuperating, Stockley was replaced by keyboard player Mal Logan (ex Healing Force, Carson), who stayed on, after Stockley returned, until the end of 1974.

Released in October 1973, "Way Out West" peaked into the top 40 on the Kent Music Report Singles Chart, and reached No. 26 in Melbourne, it became their signature tune. The Dingoes appeared at the third Sunbury Pop Festival in 1974, held on the Australia Day long weekend, and their performance featured on Mushroom's Highlights of Sunbury '74, released later that year. The same month, they recorded their self-titled debut LP, The Dingoes, which was produced by John French. Logan contributed keyboards on several tracks, including "Goin' Down" and "Sydney Ladies". "Way Out West" was later covered by James Blundell and James Reyne (ex-Australian Crawl) in 1992, their version peaked at No. 2 on the ARIA Singles Charts, Smith supplied harmonica for this version.

Lee left in May 1974 to join Ariel and was replaced on drums by Ray Arnott, (ex-Cam-Pact with Stockley, Spectrum, Mighty Kong). The Dingoes was released in June 1974, along with a second single "Boy on the Run", co-written by Stockley and Smith, which peaked at No. 24 in Melbourne but did not break into the top 50 nationally. The LP reached No. 24 on the Kent Music Report Albums Chart in July, it was the Federation of Australian Broadcasters' "Album of the Year" for 1974. A non-album single, "Smooth Sailing", written by Tolhurst, and backed with "Dingoes Lament" (an instrumental written by Bois), was released in October. During the year The Dingoes toured nationally with various artists including Bad Company, Leo Sayer, Bo Diddley, and Freddy Fender.

=== North America ===
Early in 1975, after appearing at the fourth Sunbury Pop Festival, The Dingoes received a phone call from expatriate Australian roadie Billy McCartney, who had seen them when visiting from the United States, where he had established himself as a tour manager for Elvis Presley and Rod Stewart. Returning to the US, McCartney recommended the band to Peter Rudge, who was then tour manager for The Rolling Stones and Lynyrd Skynyrd, and, after ten months negotiations, Rudge agreed to manage The Dingoes in the US.

The following months frustrated the band—with an expected summons from Rudge at any time, they were unable to commit to long-term tours or to recording—they lost valuable ground in Australia when they could have consolidated on the success of the LP and singles. Meanwhile, they provided two tracks, "Marijuana Hell" and the Percy Sledge cover "When a Man Loves a Woman" to the Various Artists live album Live at the Station which was released on Lamington Records in 1976. An American tour was finally arranged for mid-1976, by the time they arrived Rudge's attention was focused on Lynyrd Skynyrd. Just prior to leaving, Arnott quit the group by "mutual agreement" and Lee returned to the fold, meeting up with the band in North America. Arnott pursued a solo career and was later with Renée Geyer Band, Cold Chisel, and Jimmy Barnes.

The Dingoes signed a two-album deal with US-based, A&M records, on recommendations from McCartney and Rudge, and undertook three months of rehearsals in Canada, then headed for the US, where they set up base in Mill Valley, Northern California, at the start of 1977. They recorded tracks for their A&M album, Five Times the Sun, in San Francisco during January and February, produced by Elliot Mazer (Janis Joplin, Neil Young) at His Masters Wheels recording studio, with session contributions from keyboardists Nicky Hopkins and Garth Hudson; it featured liner notes by author Emmett Grogan. Five Times the Sun, which peaked at No. 25 on the Australian albums chart in August, included re-recorded versions of tracks from their first album. "Way Out West" and "Smooth Sailing", released in September, as a double A-single in Australia, did not peak into the top 50. Soon after, band members were granted their prized green cards, allowing them to base themselves in US, in their two-year stay they toured 40 states by road. A serious blow to the band's future came on 20 October when several members of proposed tour mates, Lynyrd Skynyrd, were killed in a plane crash, a tragedy which destroyed the morale of The Dingoes' management team.

Stockley left the band and returned to Australia in early 1978, initially he joined Greg Quill's new band Southern Cross, and later founded Stockley, See & Mason. He was replaced in The Dingoes by American session guitarist Andrew Jeffers-Hardin, the group had moved east and settled near Woodstock, in upstate New York. In mid-1978, they recorded a third album, Orphans of the Storm, at New York's famed The Hit Factory, and continued to tour around the US until late 1978, but their efforts to enter the US record charts were unrealised. Orphans of the Storm was released in February 1979, along with a final single, "Into the Night", but by this time Smith had returned to Australia and the Dingoes had split.

=== After The Dingoes ===
Smith came back to Australia in late 1978 and fronted his own bands including Broderick Smith's Big Combo. He branched out into TV acting with appearances in the Australian series Janus, Law of the Land, Snowy River: The McGregor Saga, Blue Heelers, and State Coroner. He worked in an acoustic duo with musical partner Mick Ahearne and played harmonica with Backsliders, alternating with Ian Collard (Collard, Greens and Gravy) as a replacement for founding member Jim Conway. and has continued to record and release solo albums. In 2013, Smith collaborated with the psychedelic band King Gizzard & the Lizard Wizard, which his son Ambrose is a member of, on their album Eyes Like the Sky. The record is structured around a story that was written and narrated by Smith.

Bois, Lee, and Tolhurst, all remained in the US. Bois returned to study, gained a master's degree and became a high school biology teacher, living and working in Maryland, and later moving to Florida. As an amateur expert on dinosaurs he contributed to the BBC TV series Walking with Dinosaurs. During his teaching years, he also wrote a creative memoir of his time in The Dingoes, titled The Dingoes' Lament (named after his track on their debut album), which remained unpublished until 2012. He later had an article published in the Historical Biology: An International Journal of Paleobiology in 2017.

After The Dingoes, Lee joined a later lineup of cult Washington group Root Boy Slim & the Sex Change Band, and eventually settled in Washington DC, where he worked with local group Johnny Bombay & the Reactions, before moving to Nashville, Tennessee. During his time in the USA Lee worked with a wide variety of artists (including Steve Marriott) until his return to Australia in the late 1990s. Unfortunately, by this time, years of alcohol abuse had taken a heavy toll on his health and John died from liver failure in July 1999. A posthumously-released CD compilation, Back 2 3 4, included The Dingoes' "So Long For So Little", a track recorded at Atlantic Studios in New York in the late 1970s, which had previously been included on The Dingoes Way Out West compilation (1992).

Tolhurst lived and worked in New York for many years, and continued his career as a songwriter, performer, and producer, both in Australia and in the US. A slightly reworked version of his song "All Fired Up" became a major hit for Pat Benatar in 1988, making the Top 20 in the US and Canada, and reaching No. 2 in Australia, where it was No. 16 on the End of Year Singles Chart. In 1995, Tolhurst collaborated with Paul Kelly on his Deeper Water album, in NYC. He was co-producer and performer in the "Spirit Returns" album and concert, which featured the reformed Goanna, Ross Hannaford (ex-Daddy Cool), and Liam O'Maonlai (Hothouse Flowers) at the Melbourne Festival in 1998. He produced numerous albums in NY including 'Little Pieces ' and 'The Way I See It' for R& B legend Jimmy Norman. In 2006 he moved to Tucson, Arizona, and set up a studio where he recorded Shane Howard's 'Goanna Dreaming' and The Dingoes reunion album 'Tracks'. After touring with The Dingoes and producing their live album, 'Live at Last', Tolhurst returned to live in Australia in 2010 and continues to work as a producer and live performer.

=== Reformation ===
On 27 August 2009, The Dingoes were inducted into the Australian Recording Industry Association (ARIA) Hall of Fame alongside Kev Carmody, Little Pattie, Mental As Anything, and John Paul Young. They were inducted into the Hall of Fame by Richard Clapton and performed "Way Out West" and "Boy on the Run". Melbourne drummer Ashley Davies (ex-Wild Pumpkins at Midnight) joined Bois, Smith, Stockley, and Tolhurst in the reformed group which recorded Tracks in late 2009 and early 2010. The new album was released on 6 August 2010, coinciding with an Australia tour, it debuted at No. 14 on the ARIA Country Music Top 20 Chart. In October 2010, their debut album, The Dingoes (1974) was listed in the book, 100 Best Australian Albums. They toured with Joe Cocker in Australia for the 2011 "Day on the Green" concerts.

In 2012 John Bois' memoir The Dingoes' Lament was published by Melbourne Books and at the end of December 2012 the group reformed (for possibly the last time) for a short series of concerts in Victoria. The lineup again comprised the four surviving original members, with Ashley Davies on drums, and the mini-tour included three sold-out shows at the Caravan Music Club in Oakleigh, Melbourne, where they were supported by Steve Hoy and Ross Hannaford.

In May 2023, Smith's website was updated to announce his death at age 75.

== Members ==
Current members

- Kerryn Tolhurst – rhythm and lead guitars, mandolin, backing vocals (1973–1979, 2009–present)
- John Bois – bass, rhythm guitar, keyboards, backing and occasional lead vocals (1973–1979, 2009–present)
- Chris Stockley – lead guitar, backing vocals (1973–1978, 2009–present)
- Ashley Davies – drums (2009–present)

Former members

- Broderick Smith – lead vocals, harmonica (1973–1979, 2009–2023; his death)
- John Lee – drums, percussion, backing vocals (1973–1974, 1976–1979, died 1998)
- John Strangio – bass guitar (1973)
- Mal Logan – keyboards (1973–1974)
- Ray Arnott – drums, backing vocals (1974–1976)
- Andrew Jeffers-Hardin – guitar (1978–1979)

Timeline

== Discography ==
=== Studio albums ===
List of studio albums, with selected details and peak chart positions
Title	Album details	Peak chart positions
Title	Album details	AUS
The Dingoes	Released: 1974; Label: Mushroom (L35110); Format: LP	24
Five Times the Sun	Released: 1977; Label: A&M (L36237); Format: LP	25
Orphans of the Storm	Released: 1979; Label: A&M (L36721); Format: LP	32
Tracks	Released: 6 August 2010; Label: Liberation Music (LMCD 0107); Format: CD	84

=== Live albums ===
List of live albums, with details
Title	Album details
Live at Last	Released: 2011; Label: Liberation Music (LMCD 0131); Format: 2×CD

=== Compilation albums ===
List of compilation albums
Title	Album details
Way Out West – The Best of The Dingoes	Released: 1992; Label: Mushroom (D24508); Format: CD
Five Times the Sun ... and Other Delicacies	Released: 1995; Label: A&M (540318-2); Format: CD

=== Singles ===
Year	Title	Peak chart positions	Album
Year	Title	AUS	Album
1973	"Way Out West"	40	The Dingoes
1974	"Boy on the Run"	55	The Dingoes
1978	"Smooth Sailing"	70	Five Times the Sun
1979	"Into the Night"	—	Orphans of the Storm
"—" denotes a recording that did not chart or was not released in that territory.

=== Other appearances ===
Year	Song contributed	Album
1976	"When a Man Loves a Woman" (Percy Sledge cover)	Live at the Station (Note: Live at the Station (Lamington Records, LAM-332, 1976) by various artists, Wild Beaver Band, Myriad, Saltbush and The Dingoes, performed in the Lounge at the Station Hotel, Prahran over two nights in March 1976. It was re-issued by Missing Link Records (co-owned by Keith Glass) in 1981. A multi-track recorder was used in the back of a truck parked outside the Lounge door in Greville Street Prahran, but the quality of tracks did not approach the live sound of the bands. Aztec Music label had originally listed it as a forthcoming CD release of The Dingoes at the Station Hotel in 1976, but it was delisted in 2008.)
1976	"Marijuana Hell" (live version)	Live at the Station

== Awards ==
=== ARIA Music Awards ===
The ARIA Music Awards is an annual awards ceremony that recognises excellence, innovation, and achievement across all genres of Australian music. They commenced in 1987. The Dingoes were inducted into the Hall of Fame in 2009.

Year	Nominee / work	Award	Result
2009	The Dingoes	ARIA Hall of Fame	inductee
