= Dallas Brooks Hall =

Former events venue in Melbourne, Australia

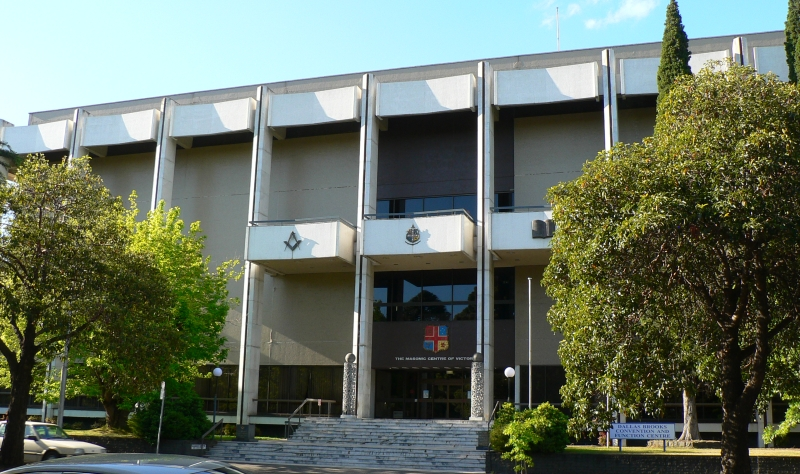
- Interactive map of Dallas Brooks Hall
- Address: 300 Albert Street; East Melbourne, Victoria; Australia
- Coordinates: 37.8098°S 144.9817°E
- Capacity: 2,300

Construction
- Opened: 1969
- Demolished: 2015

Dallas Brooks Hall known as Dallas Brooks Centre after 1993, was an Australian events venue in East Melbourne, Victoria, between 1969 and 2015, before it was demolished to make way for housing. During its existence, many well-known music concerts and other events were staged there.

== History ==
Built in 1969 for the by the local chapter of Freemasons, the building was named after the 19th Governor of Victoria, Dallas Brooks. It was designed by the architecture firm Godfrey and Spowers.

In 1974, events promoter John Pinder ran his "Reefer Cabaret" concerts at the hall. These consisted of long concerts with several musical acts, along with comedy, poetry readings, and various theatrical, dance, or novelty shows. The first event took place on 3 August 1974, and featured The Dingoes, Skyhooks, and other bands. After complaints from the Freemasons, Pinder was forced to find another venue.

In 1993 it was renamed Dallas Brooks Centre, or, according to the signage "Dallas Brooks Convention and Function Centre".

In 2001, the National Trust classified Dallas Brooks Hall in 2001, but was not successful in its bid to have the building heritage-listed by Heritage Victoria in 2002.

It was first announced in 2005 that owners Freemasons Victoria wanted to demolish the building, having entered into an agreement with Lend Lease to build a large commercial and residential development. The National Trust stated that it would oppose the demolition. Demolition was again announced in November 2012/

In 2015, Victoria State Government approval was given to demolish the hall and build residential apartments in its place, comprising two multi-storey towers with a total of 275 units. There was some controversy about the height of the apartment residential development built on the site.

== Description ==
Dallas Brooks Hall was situated opposite Fitzroy Gardens, at 300 Albert Street, East Melbourne.

The National Trust described the building as a landmark, and architecturally "unusual for including numerous halls and meeting rooms in the one complex, and the major concert hall built in Victoria in the post war period before the Arts Centre. It is also a rare example of the 1960s neo-classical revival, derived from a traditional columned temple from the Greek or Roman classical period". The hall had a seating capacity of 2,300.

== Events ==
The hall was the venue of numerous concerts, union rallies, political meetings, graduation ceremonies, public meetings, and lectures through the years.

Malcolm Fraser started the Liberal Party of Australia's campaign for the 1975 Australian federal election with a speech at the Dallas Brooks Hall.

Musicians who played at the Dallas Brooks Hall include:

- Ravi Shankar (1970, 1973, 1981)
- The Dingoes (1974)
- Skyhooks (1974)
- Rory Gallagher (1975)
- Focus, and Sebastian Hardie (1976)
- Talking Heads (1979)
- Tom Waits (1981)
- John Cale(1983)
- Sherbet
- Little River Band
- Joe Cocker
- Brownie McGhee & Sonny Terry
- Jerry Jeff Walker
- Crystal Gayle
