= Company Caine =

Australian progressive rock band

- Also known as: Co. Caine, Company Kane
- Origin: Melbourne, Victoria, Australia
- Genres: Progressive rock; psychedelic blues
- Years active: 1970–1972, 1975
- Labels: Generation; Real/Electric; Lamington/Electric
- Past members: Ray Arnott; Cliff Edwards; Jeremy Noone; Gulliver Smith; Russell Smith; Eric Cairns; John McInerny; Tim Partridge; Arthur Eizenberg; Ian Mawson; Mal Capewell; Geoff Burstin; John Power; Shirley Smith

Company Caine, also styled as Co. Caine and Company Kane, were an Australian progressive rock band. They were formed in March 1970 by Ray Arnott on drums (ex-Chelsea Set, Browns, Cam-Pact), Cliff Edwards on bass guitar (ex-Cam-Pact), Jeremy Noone (aka Jeremy Kellock) on saxophone and keyboards (ex-Leo and Friends), Gulliver Smith on lead vocals (ex-Little Gulliver and the Children, Dr Kandy's Third Eye) and Russell Smith (no relation) on guitar and vocals (ex-Cam-Pact).

== Recordings ==
In July 1970 Arnott left and was replaced by Eric Cairns (ex-Somebody's Image, Image, Heart'n'Soul) on drums and was replaced, in turn, two months later by John McInerny. At that time Edwards was replaced by Tim Partridge (ex-Clockwork Oringe) on bass guitar. In 1971 the line up of McInerny, Noone, Gulliver Smith and Russell Smith were joined by Arthur Eizenberg on bass guitar (ex-Square Circle, Dr Kandy's Third Eye, Heart'n'Soul) and Ian Mawson on keyboards. In June that line up recorded their debut single, "Trixie Stonewall's Wayward Home for Young Women" (September) and, in July, their first album, A Product of a Broken Reality (November) on Generation Records. They used the TCS Studio in Richmond, it was produced by Gus McNeil and engineered by John French. The album reached the top 40 on the Kent Music Report Albums Chart. Australian musicologist, Ian McFarlane, described the album as "a milestone of the early 1970s progressive rock era" as their "music was more expansive, more 'out there' than just about every band of the day."

Noone left in August 1971 to join King Harvest, and later that year Mal Capewell joined on saxophone and flute (ex-Phil Jones and the Unknown Blues, Dr Kandy's Third Eye). The group relocated to Sydney and were promoted as Co. Caine. Early in the following year Dave Kain joined on rhythm guitar (ex-Dr Kandy's Third Eye, Space) and they issued another single, "Dear Caroline". They disbanded in October 1972, Gulliver Smith continued his solo career and released his debut album, The Band's Alright but the Singer Is..., in the following year. Russell Smith had joined Duck and then became a member of Mighty Kong, which later included Arnott.

In 1975, Gulliver Smith and Russell Smith formed Metropolis before the group was renamed Company Caine. The line-up also included returning member John McInerney, Geoff Burstin on guitar (ex-Gutbucket, Rock Granite and the Profiles), John Power on bass guitar (ex-Foreday Riders), and Shirley Smith, Russell Smith's wife, as co-lead vocalist (ex-Lizard). Music historian Ian McFarlane wrote that the "new line-up was superior in some respects to the original" and that the group played the Melbourne and Sydney concert and dance circuit for about a year before disbanding again. In September that year they recorded studio tracks for one side of their second album, Dr. Chop (1975), three tracks were produced by Ross Wilson, the rest were extended versions of previously issued singles recorded with McNeil. The other side had live tracks, with McFarlane describing the album as "excellent and ultra-rare."

Company Caine inspired fellow Australian artists: the Church, the Sports and John Farnham. Gulliver Smith died in November 2014 after a long illness.

== Personnel ==
- Gulliver Smith – lead vocals (March 1970 – October 1972; 1975–1976)
- Russell Smith – guitars, backing and lead vocals (March 1970 – October 1972; 1975–1976)
- Jeremy Noone – saxophone, keyboards (March 1970 – August 1971)
- Cliff Edwards – bass (March–September 1970)
- Ray Arnott — drums (March–July 1970)
- Eric Cairn – drums (July–September 1970)
- John McInerny – drums (September 1970 – October 1972; 1975–1976)
- Tim Partridge – bass (September 1970 – Early 1971)
- Ian Mawson – keyboards (Early 1971 – October 1972)
- Arthur Eizenberg – bass (Early 1971 – October 1972)
- Mal Capewell – saxophone, flute (Late 1971 – October 1972)
- Dave Kain – rhythm guitar (Early 1972 – October 1972)
- Shirley Smith – lead vocals (1975–1976)
- Geoff Burstin – guitars (1975–1976)
- John Power – bass, backing vocals (1975–1976)

== Discography ==
=== Studio albums ===
List of albums, with selected chart positions
Title	Album details	Peak chart positions
Title	Album details	AUS
A Product of a Broken Reality	Released: November 1971; Format: LP; Label: Generation (GELP 004)	49
Dr. Chop	Released: 1975; Format:LP	-
