= Chants R&B =

New Zealand rhythm and blues band

Chants R&B (originally known as Chants) were a rhythm and blues band from Christchurch, New Zealand, and are considered one best examples of garage rhythm and blues from Australasia during the 1960s. They won the Battle Of The Bands contest at Addington Showgrounds in 1964. Their line-up was:

- Trevor Courtney on drums
- Michael Rudd on rhythm guitar and vocals
- Pete Hansen on bass
- Jim Tomlin lead guitar

In 1966 the position of lead guitarist was taken by Max Kelly, a deserter from the Australian Air Force. When he had to return to Australia for desertion charges, the band followed with him. By this time they had a bassist by the name of Neil Young - no relation to the well-known Canadian musician of the same name.

The band was successful in Melbourne but they could not decide whether to exclusively play soul music (very popular in Melbourne at the time mainly through a TV show called "Kommotion" which had the highly influential Ian "Molly" Meldrum as a so-host) or blues (which became popular in Australia in the 1970s) and parted ways in 1967.

== Influences ==
Their sound was heavily based on the Rolling Stones, Them, Otis Redding, the Pretty Things and the Yardbirds.

== Reformation ==
They reformed in 2007, and played in Christchurch & Auckland. Mike Rudd had a very successful career with several bands (see Mike Rudd)

== Discography ==
Date of Release	Title	Label
Albums
2000	Stage Door Witchdoctors	Bacchus
2008	Chants R&B	Norton

=== Singles ===
Year	Single	Album
1966	"I've Been Loving You Too Long"/"I Want Her"	
1966	"I'm Your Witchdoctor"/"Neighbour Neighbour"	
