= Daddy's Coolest =

Compilation album by Daddy Cool
- Released: 1982
- Genre: Australian rock
- Length: 64:17
- Label: Wizard Records, Mega Records, Castle Communications (Australasia)
- Producer: Robie Porter (tracks: 1 to 4, 16 to 20), Ross Wilson (tracks: 15)

Daddy Cool chronology
The Missing Masters (1980)	Daddy's Coolest (1982)	Daddy's Coolest Vol. 2 (1984)

Daddy's Coolest (also known as Daddy's Coolest: Volume 1 or Daddy's Coolest: The 20 Greatest Hits of Daddy Cool) is the sixth compilation album by Australian rock band Daddy Cool, released in 1982. The album peaked at number 5 on the Australian Kent Music Report and at number 29 on the Recorded Music NZ albums charts. It includes tracks from Daddy Cool's two studio albums Daddy Who? Daddy Cool and Sex, Dope, Rock'n'Roll: Teenage Heaven. The album was re-released in 1992, which reached number 35 on the ARIA Charts.

== Track listing ==
All tracks are written by Ross Wilson, except where noted

No.	Title	Length
1.	"Eagle Rock"	4:09
2.	"Daddy Cool" (Frank Slay, Bob Crewe)	2:32
3.	"Come Back Again"	3:33
4.	"Lollypop" (Beverly Ross, Julius Dixon)	1:40
5.	"Hi Honey Ho"	3:41
6.	"Sixty Minute Man" (Billy Ward, Rose Marks)	2:25
7.	"Bom Bom" (Wilson, Ross Hannaford)	2:33
8.	"At The Rockhouse"	3:45
9.	"Rock 'N' Roll Lady" (Gary Young)	2:53
10.	"I'll Never Smile Again" (Ruth Lowe)	4:16
11.	"Good Golly, Miss Molly" (Robert Blackwell, John Marascalco)	2:19
12.	"You Never Can Tell" (Chuck Berry)	2:29
13.	"One Night" (Dave Bartholomew, Pearl King, Anita Steiman)	2:42
14.	"Teenage Blues"	3:38
15.	"Boogie Man"	3:18
16.	"Cherry Pie" (Joseph Bihari as "Joe Josea", Marvin Phillips)	3:20
17.	"Just As Long As We're Together"	2:35
18.	"Please, Please America" (Wilson, Hannaford)	3:12
19.	"Baby Let Me Bang Your Box" (Teddy McRae, Sidney Wyche)	3:24
20.	"Daddy Rocks Off"	4:34

== Chart positions ==
Chart (1982)	Peak position
Australian Kent Music Report Albums Chart	5
Recorded Music NZ	29

== Certifications and sales ==
Region	Certification	Certified units/sales
Australia (ARIA)	Platinum	50,000^{^}
^{^} Shipments figures based on certification alone.

== Personnel ==
- Ross Wilson— lead vocals, guitar, harmonica (1970–1972, 1974–1975, 2005–present)
- Gary Young — drums, vocals (1970–1972, 1974–1975, 2005–present)
- Ross Hannaford— lead guitar, bass, vocals (1970–1972, 1974–1975, 2005–2016, his death)
- Wayne Duncan — bass guitar, vocals (1970–1972, 1974–1975, 2005–2016, his death)

Production

- Producer – Robie Porter (tracks: 1 to 4, 16 to 20), Ross Wilson (tracks: 15)
