= Daddy Who? Daddy Cool =

Daddy Who?... Daddy Cool

Studio album by Daddy Cool
- Released: July 2, 1971
- Recorded: 1970−71
- Studios: Armstrong Studios, Melbourne
- Genres: Australian rock, blues rock, doo-wop
- Labels: Sparmac, Warner/Reprise, Wizard
- Producer: Robie Porter

Daddy Cool chronology
Daddy Who?... Daddy Cool (1971)	Sex, Dope, Rock'n'Roll: Teenage Heaven (1971)

Singles from Daddy Who?... Daddy Cool
- 1. "Eagle Rock" Released: May 1971; 2. "Come Back Again" Released: September 1971

Daddy Who?... Daddy Cool is the 1971 debut album by Australian rock band Daddy Cool.

== Release and promotion ==
Released in July, 1971 it was the first on Robie Porter's Sparmac label. It was also the first Australian-recorded album to make No. 1 nationally and it stayed at #1 for seven weeks. Smashing all previous sales records, it achieved gold status within a month, and an unprecedented 60,000 copies sold in its initial release. It went on to become the first Australian LP to sell more than 100,000 copies.

The album was originally issued in a textured cover and featured a cartoon rendering of band members by Melbourne artist Ian McCausland which became the group's logo. While Daddy Cool's guitarist, Ross Hannaford, was responsible for overall album cover design, McCausland created the band's graphics and much of their visual image. The original songs on the album were written by guitarist and vocalist Ross Wilson except "Bom Bom", which was co-written with Hannaford. The rest of the album contained 1950s R&B covers - The Rivals' "Guided Missiles", Etta James' "Good Rockin' Daddy", Marvin & Johnny's "Cherry Pie", The Rays' "Daddy Cool" and Chuck Berry's "School Days".

Daddy Who?... Daddy Cool was also released in the US on the Warner/Reprise label and the band toured in support of its release. Two singles were lifted from the album: "Eagle Rock" No. 1 on the Australian national singles chart and "Come Back Again" which reached No. 3.

The album was re-issued in 1975 (with different sleeve under the title Daddy Who? Daddy Gold!) on Wizard Records (also owned by Porter) and in 1982, with the original artwork but non-gatefold sleeve.

The Australian release on Sparmac Records contains different tracks to the US version on Reprise which was released five months later. The Australian album includes the tracks "Good Rockin' Daddy" and "Cherry Pie" not found on the Reprise edition which features "Flip", "Lollipop" and "Just As Long As We're Together" instead.

== Critical reception ==
Professional ratings
Review scores
Source	Rating
Encyclopedia of Popular Music	3/5 stars
The Village Voice	C−

Village Voice critic Robert Christgau reacted negatively to the band's take on 1950s rock and roll, writing in Christgau's Record Guide: Rock Albums of the Seventies (1981) that "imitating it isn't re-creating it—it's killing it."

In October 2010, Daddy Who? Daddy Cool was listed at No. 14 in the book, 100 Best Australian Albums.

== Track listing ==
All songs written by Ross Wilson unless otherwise indicated.

Australian release

Side one

1. "Daddy Cool" (Frank Slay, Bob Crewe) - 2:31
2. "School Days" (Chuck Berry) - 3:03
3. "Come Back Again" - 4:51
4. "At The Rockhouse" - 3:42
5. "Guided Missile" (Alfred Gaitwood) - 3:02
6. "Good Rockin' Daddy" (Richard Berry, Joseph Bihari as "Joe Josea") - 2:21

Side two

1. "Eagle Rock" - 4:07
2. "Zoop Bop Gold Cadillac" - 3:56
3. "Blind Date" - 4:12
4. "Bom Bom" (Ross Wilson, Ross Hannaford) - 2:34
5. "Cherry Pie" (Joseph Bihari as "Joe Josea", Marvin Phillips) - 3:40

US release

Side one

1. "Daddy Cool" (Frank Slay, Bob Crewe) - 2:31
2. "School Days (Ring Goes The Bell)" (Chuck Berry) - 3:03
3. "Come Back Again" - 4:51
4. "At The Rockhouse" - 3:42
5. "Guided Missile" (Alfred Gaitwood) - 3:02
6. "Flip" (Carl Green) - 2:26

Side two

1. "Eagle Rock" - 4:07
2. "Zoop Bop Gold Cadillac" - 3:55
3. "Blind Date" - 4:12
4. "Bom Bom" (Ross Wilson/Ross Hannaford) - 2:34
5. "Lollipop" (Beverly Ross, Julius Dixon) - 1:36
6. "Just As Long As We're Together" - 2:32

== Charts ==
=== Weekly charts ===
Chart (1971/72)	Peak position
Australia (Kent Music Report)	1

=== Year-end charts ===
Chart (1971)	Peak position
Australia (Kent Music Report)	7

== Personnel ==
Daddy Cool members

- Wayne Duncan – bass guitar, vocals
- Ross Hannaford – guitar, vocals
- Ross Wilson – vocals, guitar, harmonica
- Gary Young – drums, vocals

Additional personnel

- Robie Porter – piano, steel guitar
- Jeremy Noone – saxophone
- Dave Brown – tenor saxophone, flute

Additional credits

- Robie Porter – producer
- Roger Savage – engineer
- Ross Hannaford – cover design
- Ian McCausland – cover graphics

== Release history ==
Format	Country	Label	Catalogue No.	Date
LP	AUS	Sparmac	SPL 001	July 1971
LP	US	Warner/Reprise	RS 6471	November 1971
LP	AUS	Wizard	ZL 214	1975
LP	AUS	Wizard	MID-160005	1982
