= XYZ Records =

- Founded: 1957
- Founder: Bob Crewe, Frank Slay
- Distributor: Cameo Records
- Genre: Jazz
- Country of origin: U.S.
- Official website: www.143records.com

XYZ Records was a record label founded by Frank Slay and Bob Crewe, mainly as an outlet for their songs. The label opened in 1957 and was active until about 1960. Their major success was with "Silhouettes" by The Rays, which reached No. 7 in the American singles charts. It was taken over for national distribution by Cameo-Parkway Records in Philadelphia.

The initial XYZ recordings were numbered 100 through to 106.

In late 1958, United Artists financed the reactivation of XYZ, and The Rays once again were in the studios re-recording one of their earlier songs "Elevator Operator/Souvenir of Summertime", which was released as number 2001. Further recordings in this period were numbered 600 through to 611, all without much success.

Crewe went on to produce hits for Freddy Cannon; Billy and Lillie; and The Four Lovers.

== See also ==
- List of record labels
