= Come Back Again =

Single by Daddy Cool

from the album Daddy Who? Daddy Cool
- A-side: "Come Back Again"
- B-side: "Just As Long As We're Together"
- Released: September 1971
- Genre: Australian rock, blues rock
- Length: 3:30
- Label: Sparmac; Wizard
- Songwriter(s): Ross Wilson
- Producer(s): Robie Porter

Daddy Cool singles chronology
"Eagle Rock" (1971)	"Come Back Again" (1971)	""Hi Honey Ho" (1971)

"Come Back Again" is an Australian rock song, released by Daddy Cool in September 1971 on the Sparmac record label. It reached number 3 in the Australian charts.

== Composition and recording ==
Author Wilson said the song, "was based on a Sleepy John Estes feel. A A A then kick to D G D and "Zoop Bop". I virtually wrote in my head in Darwin." He later declared it his favourite Daddy Cool song. "I love "Come Back Again" because it's so simple. It's just eight bars repeated."

Hannaford noted, "When Ross wrote those songs they were very complete and they were based on a riff. I’m almost playing the same part in "Eagle Rock" and "Come Back Again".

Drummer Gary Young said, "The main feel, the thing that made Daddy Cool sound like Daddy Cool was the shuffle beat. The shuffle is almost identical to what was called swing in the 1930s. If you slow down a jazz swing shuffle, using the cymbal and the snare, you get the beat and rhythm for "Come Back Again".

The single version was a minute shorter than the album recording. Wilson said, "The engineer was John Golden who, together with Robie Porter, did a fabulous job, I think the sound on our first album was really great and the editing on tracks like "Come Back Again" was inspired. We recorded the song as we played it, a live, long extrapolated version that was eventually edited to fit the single and album format, I learnt a lot from that process."

== Reception ==
Dave Laing at Please Kill Me said, "The second Australian smash hit from the album was the moseying "Come Back Again", a sort of country lope filtered through an R&B groove. The Sydney Morning Herald described it as a "hugely successful single [that] featured Hannaford's twangy guitar solos and the contrasting voices of Wilson (falsetto) and Hannaford (bass)."

The Age said the song was, "entrenched in the Australian consciousness".

Reviewed at the time of release, Go-Set said the song was, "the best track on the album. This is where they really ham up the sentimentality and make the most of Ross Hannaford's incredible bass voice. It's the essence of what Daddy Cool are doing."

== Personnel ==
- Wayne Duncan – bass guitar, backing vocals
- Ross Hannaford – lead guitar, backing vocals
- Ross Wilson – lead vocals, guitar, harmonica
- Gary Young – drums, backing vocals

Additional credits

- Robie Porter – producer
