= Go Records =

Go !! Records (usually badged as Go!!) Brett Leslie was referenced for GO!! Records in Milesago (Australasian Music & Popular Culture 1964-75) quoting his article 'Freedom Train'; "GO!! Records is, without doubt, one of the most significant, interesting and collectible Australian labels", further, 'it was also one of only a handful that could claim to be truly independent'. It was a small independent Melbourne-based recording label which ran from 1964 to 1968. Its releases were manufactured and distributed by the Melbourne-based recording and electronics company Astor.

Go!! the label was established by DYT Productions (Horrie Dargie, Arthur Young and John Tillbrook), which produced the allied TV teen pop music program, The Go!! Show. The label was used for cross-promotion of artists appearing on the television show. In March 1967 DYT was taken over by Office/Production Manager, Rolf Schreuder, so stated by John Pinkney TV Times 26 July and Roger Diss ListnerIn, 23 September 1967.

The label issued 54 singles, 7 EP's and 6 Albums, with varying commercial success. Bands that appeared on the GO!! Show were awarded contracts, they included the Cherokees, the Deakins, MPD Ltd, Tony & the Shantels (from Shepparton, Victoria), the Chosen Few (South Australia), and the Clique (Perth). One band, the Rondells, included members, Wayne Duncan and Gary Young, who formed the rhythm section of Daddy Cool.

Solo artists were also signed, Terry Dean, Billy Adams, Yvonne Barrett, Bettie McQuade, Field Twins, Joy Lemmon, Laurie Angelo; as referred to by Ian Mc Farlane in his booklet 'The Story of a Record Label 'Aztec Music.com.au, GO!! Records -The Complete Collection. Another group, the Strangers provided backing for solo singers who appeared on The Go!! Show and also performed their own material, which was released on the Go!! label. The Strangers' lead guitarist John Farrar produced and wrote material for Olivia Newton-John, including for the films Grease (1978) and Xanadu (1980).

Go!! Records like The GO!! Show played a very significant role in creating the music revolution in the 1960's, as quoted by renowned newsreader Mal Waldon in his book 'From The Work GO!!' that The GO!! Show developed a team[late for music shows that produced such artists as The Bee Gees, Olivia Newton-John as well as sowing the seeds for groups like Little River Band, Crowded House plus many other.

== See also ==
ARIA music charts Annual GO-Set Top 40 Radio 3XY, 3KZ, 3UZ, 3AK and other weekly top 40 charts from NSW, SA, Q, TAS, WA etc

Discogs 2016

Lelie, Brett and Hammon, Milton: GO!! Kommotion ISBN 978-0-646-89995-4 The Vault: www.NGV ngv.gov.au/GO!! Records nfsa.gov.au/TheGO!!Show/AirRecords

- List of record labels
