= Procession (band) =

Australian band

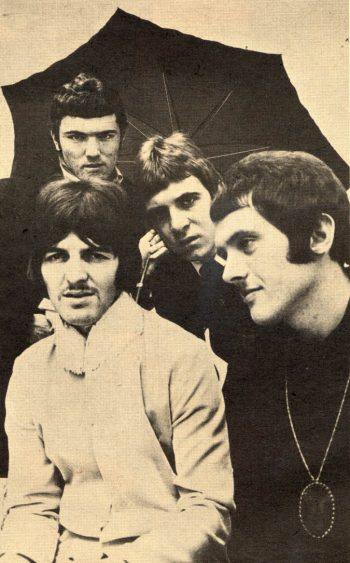
- Procession in December 1967. Clockwise from front: Brian Peacock, Craig Collinge, Mick Rogers and Trevor Griffin

Background information
- Origin: Melbourne, Victoria, Australia
- Genres: Psychedelic pop; jazz
- Years active: 1967–1969
- Labels: Festival; Philips/Mercury; Raven
- Spinoff of: The Librettos; the Playboys
- Past members: Craig Collinge; Trevor Griffin; Brian Peacock; Mick Rogers; Chris Hunt; Ross Wilson

Procession were an Australian psychedelic band formed in Melbourne in 1967. The band was composed of Australian Craig Collinge (drums), New Zealander Brian Peacock (bass), and Englishmen Trevor Griffin (organ) and Mick Rogers (guitar and vocals). They were described by Glenn A. Baker as one of the most ambitious bands in the Australian music scene in their time, although they enjoyed only moderate commercial success. They were regularly championed in Go-Set magazine and had their own segment on music TV show Uptight, of which their manager was the producer.

Their debut single "Anthem" (1967) was acapella, and their debut album was recorded live. They were also the first group in Australia to record on eight-track equipment. They relocated to London in mid-1968 and released a self-titled studio album in the following year. Ross Wilson, later of Daddy Cool, replaced Rogers in April 1969 but the group disbanded in September. Rogers would go on to join Manfred Mann's Earth Band, Collinge was a member of the English proto-punk band Third World War, Manfred Mann Chapter Three and briefly played drums in the notorious "fake" Fleetwood Mac in 1973.

== History ==
=== 1967–68: Early years ===
Procession were formed in October 1967 by members of two earlier Australasian pop groups, Normie Rowe's long-time backing band, the Playboys, and New Zealand group, the Librettos. The Librettos had formed in Wellington as a beat-pop group in 1960 and by 1965 they relocated to Sydney, where they included Craig Collinge (born 24 August 1948, Sydney) on drums and Brian Peacock (born 27 June 1946, Levin, New Zealand) on bass guitar and vocals. The Librettos broke up in June of the following year, with Peacock joining the Playboys and Collinge forming a heavy rock-trio, the Knack.

The Playboys had formed in July 1963 as an instrumental group in Melbourne and in November 1966 they relocated to London where they were the backing band for Rowe. In March 1967 Trevor Griffin (born 22 December 1944, Birmingham, England) joined on organ from the Question Marks. A month later Mick Rogers joined on guitar. While still with Rowe, the Playboys signed to Andrew Loog Oldham's Immediate label and recorded a one-off single, “Black Sheep R.I.P” (August 1967). By then Rowe and the Playboys had returned to Australia and in October the group split from Rowe and Collinge had joined on drums.

They were renamed as Procession with the line-up of Collinge on drums, Griffin on organ, Peacock on bass guitar and vocals, and Rogers on lead guitar and vocals. They made their live debut at Sebastians nightclub, Melbourne on 17 December. They signed with Festival Records, to issue their debut single, "Anthem", in December 1967; which has Peacock and Rogers providing an a cappella rendition. A second single, "Listen", appeared in March 1968 but did not chart, despite being the first Australian disc to be recorded on newly installed eight-track equipment.

The group appeared regularly on Melbourne-based TV pop show, Uptight, on ATV 0, which was produced by the band's talent manager, David Joseph. The group's debut album, Procession 'Live' at Sebastians (15 May 1968), a live recording at the venue on 3 April, failed to chart. Australian musicologist, Ian McFarlane observed, "[it] revealed the band's predilection for modern jazz." The group played a farewell Australian show at the Royale Ballroom on 18 June 1968 supported by the Twilights and the Virgil Brothers.

=== 1969: Relocation to the UK and disbanding ===
Procession relocated to London where they became a regular attraction at the Marquee during early to mid-1969. They signed to Philips/Mercury and released a second eponymous album, which was produced by Mike Hugg (of Manfred Mann), which attracted positive reviews but poor sales. McFarlane felt the album was, "a sophisticated collection of jazz-tinged psychedelic pop material." In the United States it appeared on Mercury's subsidiary label, Smash. The two singles from the album, "Every American Citizen" (October 1968) and a re-recorded version of "Anthem" re-titled as "One Day In Every Week" (December), also flopped.

In March 1969 Collinge left to join Manfred Mann Chapter Three and former Cat Stevens sideman, Chris Hunt (born 15 November 1945 in Hillingdon, England) joined on drums. In the following month Peacock asked his friend from Melbourne, singer-songwriter, Ross Wilson, formerly of the Pink Finks and the Party Machine. Wilson took over from Rogers as lead singer and also provided harmonica, although the move was resented by both Rogers and Hunt.

In late May or early June the group recorded new tracks at Olympic Studios, including Rogers' "Surrey" and Wilson's "Papa's in the Vice Squad" and "I Wanna Be Loved", but they were never released. They reportedly also featured another of Wilson's new compositions, "Make Your Stash", in their set-list, but never recorded it. According to Wilson, his song – which was based on a melody from Gustav Holst's The Planets – in turn became the basis for the abortive 1973 Manfred Mann's Earth Band album, Masque (which was abandoned when the group was unable to secure the rights to use Holst's music from the trustees of his estate).

Although the band was now nearing its end, Wilson's brief stint with Procession provided an unexpected side-benefit – it was during this period that he read a British newspaper article about the history of "juke joints" in the American south, and the accompanying photo, which showed dancers performing "The Eagle Rock and the Pigeon Wing" provided an inspiration for Wilson's breakthrough hit with his next band. Procession's final engagement was a month-long student cruise from London to New York. By this time David Joseph had lost interest in the band and was concentrating on the New Seekers. Procession officially disbanded in September 1969.

=== 1969–present: Post-split activities ===
Wilson returned to Australia early in 1970 and formed a new group, Sons of the Vegetal Mother, and then their offshoot, Daddy Cool, which had an Australian No. 1 hit with the single, "Eagle Rock". He became a solo artist and record producer for Skyhooks, which led to his induction into the ARIA Hall of Fame at the ARIA Music Awards of 1989. As a member of Daddy Cool he was inducted for a second time at the ARIA Music Awards of 2006.

Peacock returned to Australia and played with Gerry and the Joy Band in late 1971. He later played with Western Flyer before moving into rock management. He later lived on the Victoria coast. Griffin also moved back to Australia and joined Wilson in the Sons of Vegetal Mother but dropped out of the music performance scene. He wrote, "Love Is Like Oxygen", for UK band, the Sweet. He later lived in Memphis.

Collinge remained in the UK and recorded with Manfred Mann Chapter Three, Third World War and Shoot. He was also involved in the bogus Fleetwood Mac band put together in autumn 1973. After returning to Australia he was a drummer in Marcia Hines' backing band. He later lived in Sydney. Hunt subsequently worked with Lonnie Donegan.

Rogers briefly worked with Manfred Mann Chapter III, then returned to Australia, where he played with Doug Parkinson and a short-lived power trio, Bulldog, in 1970. On his return to England he joined Manfred Mann's Earth Band, recording with the group from 1971 to 1975. After another short spell back in Australia with Eclipse and Renée Geyer, he returned to the UK in 1977 to tour with Greenslade. He subsequently recorded with Aviator and subsequently rejoined Manfred Mann's Earth Band.

Procession's manager David Joseph later managed the New Seekers which had a top 20 UK hit in 1978 with a cover version of Procession's "Anthem (One Day in Every Week)". In March 2008 a compilation, The Dave Clark Five: The Hits, included the Dave Clark Five's unreleased cover version of "Every American Citizen" (it included excerpts of "America the Beautiful" and new narration by Dave Clark), credited to Clark-Peacock although previous Procession releases credited only Peacock as its songwriter.

== Members ==
- Craig Collinge: – drums, vocals (1967–69)
- Trevor Griffin: – keyboards, vocals (1967–68)
- Brian Peacock: – bass guitar, vocals (1967–69)
- Mick Rogers: – lead guitar, lead vocals (1967–69)
- Chris Hunt: – drums (1969)
- Ross Wilson: – lead vocals, harmonica, guitar (1969)

== Discography ==
=== Albums ===
- Procession 'Live' at Sebastians (live album, 15 May 1968) – Festival Records (FL 32903)
- Procession (1969) – Festival Records (FL 33091), Smash Records (SRS 67122), Mercury Records. The track listing is as follows:
  - Side One:
    You-Me / Gently Does It / Essentially Susan / Signature Tune / Adelaide, Adelaide / Take Time.
  - Side Two:
    Every American Citizen / Sweet Simplicity / Automobile / September In July / Mind Magician / Anthem.

=== Extended plays ===
- Listen (1968) – Festival Records (FX-11484)

=== Singles ===
- "Anthem" (December 1967) – Festival Records (FK-2126) AU #30
- "Listen" (March 1968) – Festival Records (FK-2247) AU #55
- "Every American Citizen" (1968) – Festival Records (FK-2575) AU #82
- "One Day in Every Week" (1969) – Festival Records (FK-2776)
