= Sons of the Vegetal Mother =

Australian rock band (1969–1971)

- Origin: Melbourne, Victoria, Australia
- Genre: Rock
- Years active: 1969–1971
- Label: Independent
- Spinoffs: Daddy Cool
- Past members: Wayne Duncan; Ross Hannaford; Ross Wilson; Gary Young

Sons of the Vegetal Mother (also known as The Vegetals to fans) were an Australian "esoteric special-occasion progressive band", formed in late 1969, with a floating line-up based around the nucleus of Ross Wilson and Ross Hannaford. A side-project of the band, formed in 1970 was Daddy Cool, which played 1950s doo-wop music plus some originals. Daddy Cool were to eclipse their parent band when their debut single "Eagle Rock" reached No. 1 on the Australian National charts.

== History ==
=== Background ===
Sons of the Vegetal Mother brought together the four musicians who subsequently became Daddy Cool, Ross Wilson and Ross Hannaford (both ex The Pink Finks, The Party Machine) and singer-drummer Gary Young and bassist Wayne Duncan, who had both been members of veteran Melbourne band The Rondells, who are best known as the backing group for pioneering beat duo Bobby & Laurie.

In early 1969, Wilson had been invited to go to the UK and join "progressive pop" band Procession. That band (which had evolved from Normie Rowe's backing group The Playboys) had relocated to Britain in 1968 but their career had stalled and they were trying to revitalise the group and find a new direction, to which end they invited Wilson to come to London to join the band. Having just received an insurance payout for a road accident he had suffered in his teens, Wilson broke up his band of the time, The Party Machine, and flew to London to join Procession.

"I received a phone call from Brian Peacock in the UK. They were having a line up change and felt a front man might be a good idea. I had to pay my own way there but had just scored an insurance payoff from a traffic injury and was eager to escape Melbourne and see the world."

Wilson arrived in London in April 1969 and the revamped Procession gigged sporadically over the next three months. During this period, they got the opportunity to record some new material at Olympic Studios in Barnes. and three tracks were cut at these sessions—Mick Rogers' "Surrey" and Wilson's "Papa's in the Vice Squad" and "I Wanna Be Loved", all of which were consigned to the vaults and are yet to see the light of day. By this time, Procession's music had taken on a new direction, with Wilson adding a more theatrical feel thanks to his interest in Frank Zappa. One of the new songs incorporated into the set (but never recorded by the band) was "Make Your Stash".

"[It] was later recorded by both Spectrum and Daddy Cool and the source for inspiration for Manfred Mann's Earth Band album that used Gustav Holst's Planets Suite. "Make Your Stash" used one of the themes from that suite with my lyrics and bridge which Mick appropriated for Manfred Mann using new lyrics."

It is worth noting that Zappa also 'borrowed' a small section of Gustav Holst's The Planets - Jupiter movement on the track Invocation & Ritual Dance Of The Young Pumpkin on the Absolutely Free Album of 1967. By June 1969 Procession was on its last legs, but manager David Joseph secured an unusual final booking for the band—a transatlantic student cruise from London to New York and back, set for the second week in August 1969, which was the trip was supposed to help pay off the band's outstanding debts.

"It was the best thing we did," says Wilson. "[It was] a lot of fun and we got to play every night and join in some cool arty student performance stuff during the day."

When they returned to London in August, Procession had effectively run its course:

"[We] ran out of money and industry interest," adds Wilson. "By then manager, David Joseph was more interested in the New Seekers, plus I think the new line up [with me and Chris] had meant the group lost whatever focus it had."

=== Formation ===
Wilson returned to Melbourne in late 1969, armed with a swag of new material, intent on creating an "esoteric special-occasion progressive band" with a floating line-up of semi-regular members and guest players, which would allow him to explore the progressive/theatrical interests that his passion for Zappa had awakened.

The Vegetals performed intermittently at multimedia and art events, 'happenings' and concerts at Melbourne galleries and venues like the TF Much Ballroom. Band 'members' at these events included Wilson and Hannaford's former Party Machine cohort Mike Rudd (later in Spectrum) and bassist Tim Partidge (Company Caine) and it was planned that other performers would join in, such as Wilson's friends Keith Glass and Gulliver Smith.

The Vegetals made few recordings—their only known release is Garden Party, a custom-pressed EP played at and given away to audiences at an event/exhibition called 'The Garden Party'. The EP was never commercially released. One track from the EP, "Make It Begin", was anthologised on Golden Miles, Raven's 2CD compilation of Australian progressive rock, and more recently "Love is the Law" and "Make It Begin" were included on Ross Wilson' career retrospective Now Listen!.

Snippets of footage of the Vegetals in performance can be seen Chris Lofven's experimental short film 806 which is now included as a special feature in the DVD edition of Lofven's 1976 feature film OZ.

Wilson, Hannaford, Young and Duncan also created a 'subset' of the Vegetals, dubbed Daddy Cool, which was devised to provide 'light relief', playing short, enjoyable sets of 1950s-style doo-wop and rock & roll between the Vegetals' lengthy, exploratory sets, playing Wilson's Zappa-influenced progressive pieces, but over time it became obvious that Daddy Cool was getting more popular than the "main act"

Sons of the Vegetal Mother were part of the line-up at one of Australia's first outdoor rock festivals at Myponga in South Australia at the end of January 1971, and this proved to be a watershed in the group's short career. The enthusiastic reception given to Daddy Cool's set eclipsed the Vegetals' performance, making it clear that Daddy Cool was taking on a life of its own, and Sons of the Vegetal Mother was soon phased out altogether. It was during the Myponga performance that Lofven filmed the footage that was later used in his promotional film-clip for "Eagle Rock".

A few months after Myponga, Daddy Cool was spotted by former teen guitar prodigy turned producer Robie Porter they signed to the Sparmac label, and in May 1971 they released their debut single "Eagle Rock". The single quickly reached No. 1 and stayed there for a (then) record ten weeks.

Wilson and Hannaford used the Sons of the Vegetal Mother band name when playing at the Station Hotel, Prahran in the short period between Daddy Cool and the launch of Mighty Kong in 1973.

== Band members ==
- Wayne Duncan (bass, vocals)
- Trevor Griffin (piano)
- Ross Hannaford (vocals, guitar)
- Jeremy Kellock (Jeremy Noone) (tenor sax*)
- Mike Rudd (bass)
- Tim Partridge (bass)
- Ian Wallace (alto sax #)
- Simon Wettenhall (trumpet #)
- Ross Wilson (vocal/guitar)
- Bruce Woodcock (tenor sax #)
- Gary Young (drums, vocals)

== Discography ==
- Garden Party (EP) (November 1970)

Side One is a buff colour and credits the song to Sons of the Vegetal Mother, with writing credited to Ross Wilson; Side two is an orange colour.
Only 250 copies of the EP were produced

1. "Love Is The Law" *
2. "The Garden Party" / Make It Begin" #
