= Little Walter DeVenne =

American DJ (1948–2021)

Little Walter DeVenne (January 16, 1948 – January 16, 2021) was an American radio personality who was for many years based in Boston, Massachusetts, and in New Hampshire and was the host of the syndicated retro oldies program Little Walter's Time Machine focusing on the pop, doo-wop, blues, R&B and early rock n' roll hits of the 1950s and early to mid-1960s, presented in the high-energy style of the Top 40 AM radio stations of that era.

== Little Walter's Time Machine ==
His program was heard on oldies stations throughout the United States beginning in Boston on WBCN when it was Freeform FM in 1968 and into the early 1970s during the 1950s "rock n' roll revival" period of that decade, gaining a following in syndication and later into "both sides of the millennium."

== Remastering first-generation rock n' roll ==
DeVenne, being a connoisseur of old-school rock-n'-roll sound, was also in the business of remastering classic recordings of 45 RPM singles as released by the independent record labels of that era. His digital remastering work and compilation production work can be found on such compact disk releases as:

- The Doo-Wop Box, various artists (Rhino)
- La Salle Chicago Blues Recordings, Little Brother Montgomery (Wolf)
- The Best Of, Little Eva (Collectibles)
- Cherry Pie, Marvin & Johnny (Ace)
- The Very Best Of, Gary U.S. Bonds (Varese Sarabande)
- Muddy Waters - Live In Chicago 1979
- Retirement from the airwaves

In 2005, DeVenne was diagnosed with cancer after cat scans and pet scans discovered lumps in his neck. Afterwards he underwent a successful surgery. Although cancer free since 2006, the longtime radio personality chose to cease production of the weekly oldies program which still runs in syndication across the country and online on iHeart Media's "Real Oldies Channel." DeVenne remained passionate about first generation rock and roll, his DJ appearances at nightclubs and his remastering business. He retired and, in 2016, left New Hampshire and moved to Brooksville, Florida.

== Death ==
DeVenne was hospitalized with COVID-19 on January 2, 2021, amidst the COVID-19 pandemic in Florida. He died from the virus in Brooksville, Florida, on January 16, 2021, his 73rd birthday.
