= MPD Ltd =

Australian pop music band

- Origin: Melbourne, Australia
- Genre: Beat pop
- Years active: 1965–1967
- Labels: Go!!; Raven; Canetoad
- Past members: Mike Brady; Pete Watson; Danny Finley; Phil Blackmore; Wayne Duncan; Gary Howard

MPD Ltd or M. P. D. Limited were an Australian pop music band formed in 1965 by core members Mike Brady on lead vocals and guitar, Pete Watson on bass guitar and lead vocals, and Danny Finley on drums. They used their first initials to provide the name. Their popular singles were "Little Boy Sad" (July 1965) and "Lonely Boy" (October). MPD Ltd issued an album, The Best of MPD Ltd, in 1966 on Go!! Records before disbanding in 1967. Pete Watson died of an illness on 30 April 1972.

== History ==
MPD Ltd were formed in 1965 two months after Mike Brady on guitar had joined Melbourne instrumental group, the Phantoms, alongside Pete Watson on bass guitar. Brady and Watson left to perform beat pop music in the footsteps of the Beatles by adding vocals and were joined by Danny Finley (ex-Saxons, Sonics) on drums in May 1965. Three weeks later they supported United Kingdom visitors, the Dave Clark Five, and local artists, Tony Worsley and the Fabulous Blue Jays on an Australian tour.

The trio were signed to Go!! Records by July 1965 to release their debut single, "Little Boy Sad". It is a cover version of Johnny Burnette's 1961 hit. MPD Ltd's rendition reached No. 1 in Brisbane, Melbourne and Perth, No. 5 in Sydney and top 10 in Adelaide. They appeared on TV pop programmes, The Go!! Show and Saturday Date, as well as touring Australia. According to Australian musicologist, Ian McFarlane, their performances "left their fans screaming for more. It revolved around a frantic, non-stop, 20-minute barrage of songs, Brady and Watson's carefully choreographed gymnastics and Finley's flamboyant drumming antics."

The second single, "Lonely Boy (October 1965), was a cover of Paul Anka's 1959 single. It reached No. 3 in Melbourne and Perth. In 1965 they also issued a four-track extended play, Little Boy Sad. "Walkin' in the Sand" (February 1966), a cover version of the Shangri-Las 1964 hit was MPD Ltd's third single, which reached the top 10 in Melbourne. They released their debut album, The Best of MPD Ltd in 1966. The group's following singles "No Regrets" (June 1966) and "Absence Makes the Heart Grow Fonder" (August) did not chart. From August to December of that year they relocated to the UK but "made little headway and decided to return home." The line-up was expanded in 1967 by Phil Blackmore on piano (ex-Normie Rowe and the Playboys), Wayne Duncan on bass guitar and Gary "Dick" Howard on drums. They issued a second four-track EP, MPD Ltd, in 1967 and their final single, "Paper Doll" in March. However the group had broken up by that time.

Early in 1967 Watson formed Rockhouse with Rick Springfield on lead guitar and vocals, when Finley joined on drums in late 1968 they were renamed MPD Ltd and undertook a tour of South Vietnam, returned to Australia but split up soon after. Watson became ill during the late 1960s and died in Perth on 30 April 1972. Brady and Finley had been members of Johnny Young's backing band, Kompany, during 1967. In August Blackmore, Finley and Howard formed Wickedy Wak with Springfield. In the 1970s and 1980s Finley was the talent manager of his then-wife, Colleen Hewett. Brady turned to writing ad jingles and sporting-themed works including, "Up There Cazaly" (1979).

== Discography ==
=== Albums ===
- The Best of MPD Ltd (1966) – Go!! Records (GLP 3006)
- The Wild Side of Life – The Musical Adventures of Mike, Pete and Danny! (1982) – Raven Records (RVLP 07)
- M.P.D. Ltd: The Legendary Go!! Recordings (1996) – Canetoad Records (RVLP 07)
