= Mr. Bear =

Mr. Bear may refer to:

- Teddy McRae, American jazz saxophonist
- Barney Bear, children's television show
