= The New Cool =

Studio album by Daddy Cool
- Released: November 2006
- Recorded: 1994–2006
- Studio: Melbourne, Australia
- Genre: Australian rock
- Length: 51:16
- Label: Liberation Music
- Producer: Ross Wilson

Daddy Cool chronology
Daddy Cool Live! The Last Drive-In Movie Show (1973)	The New Cool (2006)

Limited/tour edition

The New Cool is the third studio album, by Australian rock band Daddy Cool. It was released in November 2006, thirty-four years after the release of their previous studio album, Sex, Dope, Rock'n'Roll: Teenage Heaven.

Although the album failed to appear on the Australian albums chart, it was released to critical acclaim from numerous sources all over – and even outside of – Australia. A review by 'Pete Best' of the Sunday Herald Sun declared the album to be 'an irresistible mix of 1950s West Coast garage, Chuck Berry & doo wop'.

== Background ==
Talks of a new album arose as early as 1993, when the band was approached by Skyhooks, an Australian band that Daddy Cool's frontman, Ross Wilson, had produced albums for in the past. A 'double-bill arena tour' was planned for the two bands, but the project was soon cancelled before the studio album they were making to accompany the tour could be completed. Seven of the tracks from the 1994 sessions went on to be released on this album.

The creation of the album, and the story of the recording of the tracks, is recounted by Ross Wilson in this excerpt from the liner notes:

In February 2005 we regrouped as a spontaneous one-off to lend weight to the bill of the Melbourne Tsunami Benefit Concert. To a joyful audience of 10,000 Daddy Cool's first public performance in thirty years was filmed, recorded, and released as part of 'The Complete Daddy Cool', a five-hour DVD detailing our history. The three 'live' bonus tracks on this album are from that day.

In late 2005 we put our hands up for charity once again and recorded 'The Christmas Bug' for the annual Myer/Salvation Army CD 'The Spirit of Christmas'. That session was a breeze done in one take, then over dubbed and mixed by the end of the second day. We were so happy with the way it sounded that we began to believe it might be a good idea to complete that pesky lost album and get it out there as much for ourselves as for the public who stuck by us for so long. Besides we were about to be inducted into the ARIA Hall Of Fame in August 2006 and had a couple of big festival gigs coming up later in the year. In June 2006 we spent 2 days cutting new basic tracks. The eight we completed show how we've both changed yet stayed the same.

== Track listing ==
All songs written by Ross Wilson unless otherwise indicated.

1. "Daddy's Back" - 3:20
2. "Whole Lotta Shakin' Goin' On" (Dave Williams) - 3:08
3. "$64000 Question" (Woods) - 2:11
4. "For You" - 3:32
5. "You Can't Have Everything" - 3:06
6. "Sun Is Always Shinin'" (Ross Hannaford) - 2:49
7. "Getting Drunk" (Gary Young) - 2:52
8. "Hey Senorita" (Carl Green, Curtis Williams) - 3:07
9. "Sexy Girl" (Ross Wilson, A. Cadell) - 4:35
10. "The Christmas Bug" (Ross Wilson, Eris O'Brien) - 2:35
11. "Everybody's In The Mood" (Chester Burnett) - 2:47
12. "Barbara" (Huey Smith) - 3:22
13. "They Built The Ute" (Peter Lillie) - 3:04
14. "The Ballad of Oz" - 3:06
15. "Uluru" (Hannaford, L. Austin) - 4:18
16. "Waves" (Hannaford) - 3:34

Bonus tracks Recorded live at the Melbourne Tsunami Benefit Concert in February 2005.

17. "Come Back Again" - 4:48
18. "Bom Bom" (Wilson, Hannaford) - 3:03
19. "Daddy Cool" (Frank Slay, Bob Crewe) - 2:55

Tour edition bonus disc This edition omits the above bonus tracks and instead includes a bonus disc of songs performed live at RocKwiz in the Park, in March 2007.

1. "$64000 Question" (Woods) - 2:14
2. "Everybody's In The Mood" (Burnett) - 2:33
3. "Come Back Again" - 4:00
4. "Bom Bom" (Wilson, Hannaford) - 2:58
5. "Baby Let Me Bang Your Box" (Teddy McRae, Sidney Wyche) - 3:14
6. "Momma Don't Tear My Clothes" (Traditional; arranged by Wilson) - 3:48
7. "Daddy Cool" (Slay, Crewe) - 3:27
