= The New Cool (disambiguation) =

The New Cool is an album by the Australian rock band Daddy Cool.

The New Cool also refers to:

- The New Cool (Bob James and Nathan East album)
- The New Cool (book) by Neal Bascomb

== See also ==
- New Cool Collective, a Dutch musical ensemble
