= The Ballad of Oz =

Single by Daddy Cool

from the album The New Cool
- A-side: "Happy Hippy Hut"
- Released: August 1994
- Recorded: May 1994
- Studio: Gotham Audio
- Label: Mushroom Records
- Songwriter: Ross Wilson
- Producer: Ross Fraser

Daddy Cool singles chronology
"Eagle Rock (re-release)" (1989)	"The Ballad of Oz" (1994)	"The Christmas Bug" (2004)

"The Ballad of Oz" is a song by the Australian group, Daddy Cool, released in August 1994 as a double-A sided single with "Happy Hippy Hut" by Skyhooks. The single peaked at number 35 on the ARIA Charts, remaining in that position for three consecutive weeks.

== Background and release ==
In 1994, Skyhooks and Daddy Cool briefly reformed in a proposed 1994 stadium tour and together released a double-A sided single. The tour was ultimately downgraded to the pub circuit.

== Track listing ==
CD single (D 11845)
No.	Title	Writer(s)	Length
1.	"The Ballad Of Oz" (by Daddy Cool)	Ross Wilson	3:06
2.	"$64,000 Question" (by Daddy Cool)	Woods	2:10
3.	"Happy Hippy Hut" (by Skyhooks)	Greg Macainsh	3:45
4.	"You Just Like Me 'Cos I'm Good in Bed" (The Safe Sex Mix) (by Skyhooks)	Macainsh	3:46

== Charts ==
Chart performance for "The Ballad of Oz"
Chart (1994)	Peak position
Australia (ARIA)	35
