= Dark Side of the Man =

Studio album by Ross Wilson
- Released: July 11, 1989
- Recorded: October 1988 − March 1989
- Studio: Record Plant, New York City; Metropolis Audio, Powerplant, Platinum, Melbourne; Rhinoceros, EMI Studios 301, Paradise, Sun, Sydney
- Genre: Rock
- Length: 47:41
- Label: WEA; Mushroom
- Producer: Paul Grabowsky; Ricky Fataar; Mark Moffatt

Ross Wilson chronology
Dark Side of the Man (1989)	Go Bongo Go Wild (2001)

Dark Side of the Man is the first studio album by Australian musician Ross Wilson, released in 1989. Two singles were released from the album—"Bed of Nails" and the title track "Dark Side of the Man". Dark Side of the Man peaked at number 28 on the ARIA Albums Chart and number 26 on the Kent Music Report. The song "Bed of Nails" peaked at number 25 on the ARIA Singles Chart.

== Reception ==
Juke said, "The beauty of this LP is the laconic ease with which he switches its style. Wilson's encyclopaedic and instinctive knowledge of pop, jazz and club music sounds finds him picking high and low for inspiration.

== Track listing ==
Dark Side of the Man track listing
No.	Title	Writer(s)	Length
1.	"Dark Side of the Man"	Duncan Veall, Ross Wilson	3:56
2.	"Bed of Nails"	Eris O'Brien, John Pullicino, Ross Wilson	4:07
3.	"Ever Get the Feeling (That You've Been Had)"	Ross Wilson	4:30
4.	"Who Do You Take It To"	Eris O'Brien, John Pullicino, Ross Wilson	4:40
5.	"You Got a Mirror"	Ross Wilson	3:36
6.	"Go Bongo – Go Wild"	Ross Wilson	4:08
7.	"When I Get My Hands on You"	Pat Wilson, Ross Wilson	5:06
8.	"Tough Guy"	Pat Wilson, Ross Wilson	3:37
9.	"What's Wrong with This Picture?"	Eris O'Brien, John Pullicino, Ross Wilson	4:50
10.	"Slow Fade"	Eris O'Brien, John Pullicino	4:26
11.	"Visit to America (Wild New World)"	Eris O'Brien, John Pullicino, Ross Wilson	4:45
Total length:			47:41

== Personnel ==
- Acoustic guitar – Kerryn Tolhurst
- Alto saxophone – Ian Chaplin (tracks: 6 to 8)
- Alto saxophone solo – Ian Wallace (tracks: 7)
- Backing vocals – Eris O'Brien (tracks: 9, 11), James Gillard (tracks: 1), Linda Bull (tracks: 5), Mark Williams (4) (tracks: 3, 4), Vika Bull (tracks: 5), Wendy Matthews (tracks: 3, 4)
- Backing vocals (chanting) – Anthony Joyner (tracks: 3), Darren Jenkins (tracks: 3)
- Bass – Barry Johnson (tracks: 2, 3, 9), Ian Belton (tracks: 4, 5, 11), Lloyd Swanton (tracks: 6 to 8)
- Bass, backing vocals – Daryl Johnson
- Double bass – Tony Garnier (tracks: 10)
- Drums – Andrew Travers (tracks: 11), Gary Young (tracks: 4), Peter Luscombe (tracks: 5), Tony Floyd (tracks: 6 to 8)
- Drums, backing vocals – Ricky Fataar (tracks: 1 to 3, 9)
- Engineer – Angus Davidson (tracks: 6 to 8), Paul Special (tracks: 1 to 3, 9, 10)
- Fiddle – Wayne Goodwin (tracks: 5)
- Guitar – Doug De Vries (tracks: 6 to 8), Mark Moffatt (tracks: 3 to 5, 11), Mark Punch (tracks: 4, 5)
- Keyboards – Craig Hooper (tracks: 4), Richard Tee (tracks: 10)
- Keyboards, backing vocals, percussion – Jay Askew (tracks: 10)
- Keyboards, clavinet – Bernie Worrell (tracks: 1 to 3, 9)
- Lead guitar, electric guitar – Shane Fontayne (tracks: 1, 2, 9)
- Lead guitar, rhythm guitar – Chris Spedding (tracks: 3)
- Mandolin – Wayne Goodwin (tracks: 11)
- Percussion – Ray Pereira (2) (tracks: 6 to 8)
- Piano, strings, vibes – Paul Grabowsky (tracks: 6 to 8)
- Rhythm guitar – Mike Hampton (tracks: 1)
- Shaker – Alex Pitou (tracks: 4, 5)
- Tenor saxophone solo – Paul Williamson (tracks: 6 to 8)
- Trombone – Russell Smith (tracks: 7, 8)
- Trumpet – Vince Jones (tracks: 8)
- Vocals – Russell Smith (4) (tracks: 6), Shelley Scown (tracks: 6, 7)
- Vocals, guitar, harmonica – Ross Wilson

Production

- Producer – Paul Grabowsky (tracks: 6 to 8), Ricky Fataar (tracks: 1 to 3, 9, 10)
- Producer, engineer – Mark Moffatt (tracks: 4, 5, 11)
- Mixed by Mark Opitz
- Mixed by (assistant) – Andrew Scott

== Charts ==
Chart performance for Dark Side of the Man
Chart (1989)	Peak position
Australian Albums (ARIA)	28
