= Sex, Dope, Rock'n'Roll: Teenage Heaven =

Studio album by Daddy Cool
- Released: December 1971
- Recorded: Armstrong's Studios, Melbourne
- Genre: Australian rock
- Label: Sparmac, Warner/Reprise, Wizard
- Producer: Robie Porter

Daddy Cool chronology
Daddy Who? Daddy Cool (1971)	Sex, Dope, Rock'n'Roll: Teenage Heaven (1971)	Daddy Cool Live! The Last Drive-In Movie Show (1973)

Singles from Sex, Dope, Rock'n'Roll: Teenage Heaven
- 1. "Hi Honey Ho" Released: December 1971

US Album Cover

Sex, Dope, Rock'n'Roll: Teenage Heaven, released as simply Teenage Heaven in the US, is the second studio album by Australian rock band Daddy Cool, released in December 1971. It reached number 15 on the Kent Music Report, and contains the hit single "Hi Honey Ho". It was their last studio album for 34 years, until the release of their 2006 album, The New Cool.

The Australian release on Sparmac Records contains different tracks to the US release on Reprise Records five months later. The Australian release includes the six-minute version of "Hi Honey Ho", whereas on the US release the track is cut to three-and-a-half minutes. Other differences include the tracks "Sixty Minute Man" and "Make Your Stash", which are omitted from the American release and are replaced by "I'll Never Smile Again" and "Teenage Blues", respectively.

== Track listing ==
Australian edition

Side one

1. "Hi Honey Ho" - 6:45
2. "Daddy Rocks Off" - 4:34
3. "Please Please America (Hear My Plea)" (Ross Wilson, Ross Hannaford) - 3:12
4. "Sixty Minute Man" (Billy Ward, Rose Marks) - 2:25
5. "Baby Let Me Bang Your Box" (Teddy McRae, Sidney Wyche) - 3:25

Side two

1. "Teen Love" - 3:03
2. "Drive In Movie" - 1:15
3. "Love In An F.J." - 4:43
4. "Donna Forgive Me" - 4:36
5. "Make Your Stash" - 6:04

U.S. Edition

Side one

1. "Hi Honey Ho" - 3:29
2. "Daddy Rocks Off" - 4:34
3. "Please Please America (Hear My Plea)" (Ross Wilson, Ross Hannaford) - 3:12
4. "I'll Never Smile Again" (Ruth Lowe) - 4:17
5. "Baby Let Me Bang Your Box" (Teddy McRae, Sidney Wyche) - 3:25

Side two

1. "Teen Love" - 3:03
2. "Drive In Movie" - 1:22
3. "Love In An F.J." - 4:35
4. "Donna Forgive Me" - 4:36
5. "Teenage Blues" - 3:29

== Charts ==
Chart (1971–1972)	Peak position
Australia (Kent Music Report)	15
