= The Deakins =

Australian rock band

- Origin: Melbourne, Victoria, Australia
- Genres: Rock
- Years active: 1963–1973
- Labels: Go!!; Canetoad * Aztec
- Past members: Jeff W Donoghue; Ian Kinkead; Bob Millar; Gary Schober

The Deakins were an Australian rock band which formed in 1963. This was the era of the local version of beat music; which included 1960s garage rock, proto-punk and pop. Their initial line-up included Jeff W Donoghue on bass guitar, Ian Kinkead on drums, and Bob Millar and Gary Schober on guitars. The later Deakins 'trio' released two singles in 1966, "Tonight You're Gonna Fall in Love with Me" and "Take Me for a Little While", via GO!!. The band regularly appeared on the related TV pop music weekly series, The Go!! Show, and on daily weekday show, Kommotion, both broadcast by ATV-0. The Deakins disbanded in 1973.

== History ==
The Deakins were a Melbourne-based band created in 1963, originally as a 1960s pop, surf rock quartet, with Jeff W Donoghue on bass guitar, Ian Kinkead on drums, Bob Millar on lead guitar and Gary Schober on rhymth guitar. Each member would also participate with vocals. They reformed as a trio and later as a quintet. They performed in Melbourne, Geelong, Torquay and Warrnambool. In developing their sound they focused on three-part vocal harmonies. Jeff Donoghue used a Fender Bass VI (six string bass guitar), as part of his performance. For over three years, they were the resident band at a Geelong Saturday dance venue, Surf City, later renamed, Teen Scene. They also worked at many surf club dances along the Victorian southern coast, near the Great Ocean Road region. In Melbourne, the Deakins performed at a variety of music venues as well. These include some notable locations that have avoided demolition, like the George Hotel, in St. Kilda, Victoria and Festival Hall (Melbourne).

During years, 1964 to 1965 each member turned 18-years-old and, with Australia's involvement in the Vietnam War, each registered for possible conscription into National Service. None were chosen to serve and the group decided to turn professional. Their decision to do so, in 1965, resulted in Schober departing. They were part of the second wave of rock and roll in Australia. As a trio of Jeff Donoghue, Ian Kinkead and Bob Millar, in 1966 the Deakins were signed to the GO!! label.

In one morning session, early in 1966, the Deakins' GO!! recordings were produced by Ron Tudor and engineered by Roger Savage at Armstrong Studios in South Melbourne. They recorded four tracks, for two singles, "Tonight You're Gonna Fall in Love with Me" (cover version of the Shirelles' 1964 track) and "Take Me for a Little While" (originally by Evie Sands in 1965), which were both issued in 1966. The B-side of their second single, "Look and Learn", was written by Bob Millar, with a guitar riff idea by Donoghue. During 1966 they regularly appeared on TV pop music shows, Kommotion and The Go!! Show, both broadcast on ATV-0.

In 1967 Kommotion finished up early in the year, while The Go!! Show ended in August. Go Records ceased by 1968. Consequently, along with a wave of other artists of the time, the Deakins' GO!! era had ended. The group continued working in the club and pub circuit around Melbourne. During the Vietnam War, in the early 1970s, Kinkead, departed the group to join with other musicians to entertain the American soldiers serving in Southern Vietnam. When Kinkead returned to Melbourne in 1972 they reformed as a quintet, with Donoghue, Kinkead and Millar, joined by two new members from Kinkead's Vietnam experience. The group, with a second lead singer and a keyboard player, performed in a new music era, the Australian pub rock scene. The 1960s weekend dance hall venues were obsolete. External pressures and demands caused the Deakins to disband in 1973. Their last appearances were at the Blackburn Hotel (see Blackburn).

== Legacy ==
The GO!! Show's archives are limited in number today and although over 200 shows were performed they are rare collector's items now. The Deakins performances of "Look and Learn" and "Tonight you're gonna fall in love" was recorded on series three, episode 117, on 28 November 1966. The tape for this episode survived. Other artists appearing on the shows were numerous and some of the other rare tapes to remain, including extracts of performances by a then young singer, Olivia Newton-John.

Decades on, after a resurgence of interest in the music of the Sixties for Australian garage groups, other Australian Record Companies have rescued the Deakins' song set from the archives. Remastering and re-releasing the tracks as part of a series of Composite CDs. These CDs portray the music beat scene of the sixties GO!! Era. The Original 7 inch vinyl records, displaying the GO!! label, have become desirable collector's items. "Look and Learn" has become the group's signature song.

In 2015 the National Film and Sound Archive (NFSA) fully restored the only complete episode remaining of the GO!! Show, episode 117. The Deakins had performed two of their tracks on this (as above). The restored episode was presented as a special event, at the St Kilda Film Festival, on 25 May 2015. Then on 5 February 2016 for the NFSA program, A Teenage Dream 1966 at the ARC cinema, Canberra. (Ref. Fiona Rothchilds' weblog article "A Teenage Dream 1966").

== Discography ==
=== Singles ===
- "Tonight You're Gonna Fall in Love with Me" (1966) – GO!! (GO-5033)
- "Take Me for a Little While" (1966) – GO!! (GO-5041)

=== Other appearances ===
- "Tonight You're Gonna Fall in Love with Me", "Look and Learn" – The Go!! Show 1966 – Volume 2 DVD

== See also ==
- Music of Australia
- The Go!! Show
- Kommotion
