= Daddy Cool (band) =

Australian rock band

- Origin: Melbourne, Victoria, Australia
- Genres: Australian rock, blues rock, doo-wop
- Years active: 1970–1972, 1974–1975, 2005–present
- Labels: Sparmac, Wizard; Reprise; Sony / BMG; Liberation
- Spinoff of: Sons of the Vegetal Mother
- Members: Ross Wilson; Gary Young
- Past members: Jeremy Noone; Gunther Gorman; Wayne Burt; Ross Hannaford (deceased); Wayne Duncan (deceased); Ian Winter (deceased)
- Website: http://www.daddycool.com.au/

Daddy Cool is an Australian rock band formed in Melbourne, Victoria, in 1970 with the original line-up of Wayne Duncan (bass guitar, vocals), Ross Hannaford (lead guitar, bass, vocals), Ross Wilson (lead vocals, rhythm guitar, harmonica) and Gary Young (drums, vocals). Their debut single "Eagle Rock" was released in May 1971 and stayed at number 1 on the Australian singles chart for ten weeks. Their debut, July 1971's LP Daddy Who? Daddy Cool, also reached number 1 and became the first Australian album to sell more than 100,000 copies. The group's name is the same as the 1957 song "Daddy Cool" by US rock group the Rays, and Daddy Cool included their version of the song on the album Daddy Who? Daddy Cool.

Daddy Cool's music was originally largely 1950s doo-wop-style cover versions and originals mostly written by Wilson. On stage they provided a danceable sound which was accessible and fun. Their second album, Sex, Dope, Rock'n'Roll: Teenage Heaven from January 1972, also reached the top ten. Breaking up in August 1972, Daddy Cool briefly reformed during 1974–1975 before disbanding again. They reformed with the band's original line-up in 2005. They were inducted into the Australian Recording Industry Association (ARIA) Hall of Fame on 16 August 2006. At the Music Victoria Awards of 2014, Daddy Cool was also inducted into the Music Victoria Hall of Fame.

== History ==
=== 1964–1970: Previous bands ===
Ross Hannaford (guitar, bass, vocals) and Ross Wilson (guitar, vocals, harmonica) formed pop / R&B Melbourne-based group The Pink Finks in 1964 while they were still attending high school in the south eastern Melbourne suburb of Beaumaris, Victoria; they later attended the senior campus of Sandringham College. They recorded a version of Richard Berry's "Louie Louie" in 1965 which led to a recording contract and three more singles. In 1967 they formed The Party Machine, which had a more radical sound (influenced by Frank Zappa and Howlin' Wolf), the band now including Mike Rudd (later in Spectrum) on bass guitar. They released a single "You've All Gotta Go" in 1969; their printed songbooks were confiscated and burned by the Victorian Vice Squad for being obscene and seditious. Wilson disbanded The Party Machine in 1969 after receiving an invitation to travel to London to join expatriate Australian band Procession. After they released Procession on Festival Records Wilson returned to Australia.

Wayne Duncan (bass, vocals) and Gary Young (drums, vocals) had been the rhythm section of many bands, particularly instrumental groups, since the 1950s. One of these was The Rondells, who were also the backing band for Bobby & Laurie a popular singing duo (with number-one hit single "Hitch Hiker" in 1966).

Young and Wilson met in 1969 whilst working in a book warehouse. Each had previous bandmates who were interested in forming a new group. Wilson, Hannaford, Young and Duncan formed Sons of the Vegetal Mother later that year, a group with an experimental progressive rock sound. Other members included: Rudd (bass), Trevor Griffin (piano), Jeremy Kellock (Jeremy Noone) (tenor sax), Tim Partridge (bass), Ian Wallace (alto sax), Simon Wettenhall (trumpet) and Bruce Woodcock (tenor sax).

=== 1970–1972: Original line-up ===
Four of Sons of the Vegetal Mother's members (Duncan, Hannaford, Wilson and Young) formed Daddy Cool in 1970. All shared a love of 1950s music and initially played covers of songs from their record collections. One of these was "Daddy Cool" (written by Bob Crewe and Frank Slay) performed in 1957 by US doo-wop band the Rays as the B-side to their single "Silhouettes", however Ross Wilson has stated that the band was named before he had heard the song. Daddy Cool became a popular live fixture in Melbourne. Their early 1971 appearance at the Myponga Festival in South Australia upstaged their parent group, Sons of the Vegetal Mother, which subsequently dissolved.

One-time child guitar prodigy Robie Porter (formerly known as Rob EG), had recently returned to Australia and established himself as record producer, purchasing a share of Melbourne independent label Sparmac Records. He saw the band's performance at a 7 May 1971 gig in Melbourne and immediately signed them to his label. Sparmac also released Healing Force's "Golden Miles" and Rick Springfield's "Speak to the Sky". The single "Eagle Rock" was released before the end of May and quickly went to number 1 on the Australian charts, where it stayed for a then-record ten weeks. The track written by Wilson, produced by Porter, was, ironically, replaced at No. 1 by a novelty version of a song from Daddy Cool's own set list—the single "Daddy Cool", performed in Chipmunks style by the studio band Drummond. Drummond (aka Mississippi), which included Graeham Goble (later in Little River Band), had performed it in tribute to Daddy Cool. "Eagle Rock" was named the second-best Australian song of all time at the 2001 APRA Awards with the best being "Friday on My Mind" by 1960s group the Easybeats.

Daddy Cool's debut album, Daddy Who? Daddy Cool, sold an unprecedented 60,000 copies within a month of its release in July 1971, and became the first Australian album to sell more than 100,000 copies. According to Wilson, the sales required for a gold album in Australia in the early 1970s had been 10,000 copies and was altered to 15,000 and then 20,000. The band toured Australia with Spectrum (led by former bandmate Mike Rudd) on the Aquarius Tour. Their second single "Come Back Again", also written by Wilson, was released in September 1971 and reached number 3. Also in September, Jeremy Kellock (aka Jeremy/Jerry Noone) (saxophone, keyboards (ex-Sons of the Vegetal Mother, Company Caine) joined the touring lineup of the band (he had played sax on Daddy Who? Daddy Cool). The album, produced by Porter, who also provided piano and steel guitar, was released in the US. The band toured there in August 1971 but had little chart or radio success, although their performances were well received.

In November, Daddy Cool aka D.C.E.P., a five-track EP was released and reached number 12. Each group member sang a track, the most widely played being "Lollipop" with vocals by Wilson. An edited version of the song "Hi Honey Ho", their third single, written by Wilson, was released in December and reached number 16. The full 6:48 studio cut of the song was released on a rare promotional single.

Wilson experimented with his song writing on Sex, Dope, Rock'n'Roll: Teenage Heaven, Daddy Cool's second album. Produced by Porter again, it was released on Sparmac Records in December 1971 and incorporated more progressive material similar to Sons of the Vegetal Mother's music. Two of the tracks were 1950s covers "Baby Let Me Bang Your Box" and "Sixty Minute Man", which together with the album title provoked concern in the media. It reached No. 15 on the national albums chart, and was released in US as Teenage Heaven. At about this time, the group were filmed by director / producer Bob Weis for a 37-minute documentary, Daddy Cool released in 1973. The documentary includes interviews with, and performances by, the Duncan, Hannaford, Noone, Wilson and Young line-up. It also includes a song from Pat Wilson, at that time Ross Wilson's wife.

By February 1972, Noone had left, feeling that he was not fully involved in the spirit of the group. He was replaced in March by Ian "Willy" Winter (ex-Carson) on rhythm guitar who was recruited to enable Ross Wilson to concentrate on singing. The band undertook a third US tour from March–June 1972 and recorded several tracks including "Teenage Blues", "At the Rockhouse" and "Rock'n'Roll Lady" at Warner Bros. studios in L.A. "I'll Never Smile Again" was released in July and reached No. 16, but by this time tensions were growing within the band and Wilson in particular was tiring of the difficulty of presenting the more progressive material he wanted to perform within the confines of the group's entrenched "good time" image. They announced their break-up soon after their return from the US and performed their last gig at the Much More Ballroom on 13 August 1972. The entire concert was recorded and released as the double-album Daddy Cool Live! The Last Drive-In Movie Show, issued on Porter's new label, Wizard Records in September 1973 and reached number 34.

=== 1972–1974: Daddy Cool separates ===
When asked why Daddy Cool first broke up, Wilson responded with:

It was my doing. We went over to the States three times, and even though people loved us, I felt like it was taking coals to Newcastle, you know, singing doo-wop. So I'm looking around America going, 'Gee, if I brought a contemporary band over here, maybe we could really kill.'

— Ross Wilson, 2005

Ian Winter returned to Carson, they produced Blown in 1972 and disbanded before On the Air was released in 1973. In 1977, he rejoined Wilson in Mondo Rock. Duncan and Young formed their own boogie band, Gary Young's Hot Dog in September 1972, they released two singles in 1973 "Rock-a-Billy Beating Boogie Band" and "The Saga of the Three Little Pigs". Hannaford and Wilson, who were constrained by the Daddy Cool image, formed Mighty Kong in May 1973 to play more serious music, and released the album All I Wanna Do Is Rock before disbanding in December.

=== 1974–1975: First reformation ===
Both Mighty Kong and Gary Young's Hot Dog had disbanded, and by early 1974 a reformed Daddy Cool (Duncan, Hannaford, Wilson and Young) played at the Sunbury Pop Festival which included a fledgling Skyhooks and UK band Queen – the latter two were both booed off stage. In June / July, Wilson took time off from Daddy Cool to produce the recording of Skyhooks' debut album Living in the Seventies for Mushroom Records. Besides compilations, Daddy Cool provided three new singles: "All I Wanna Do Is Rock (part 1)", "The Boogie Man" and "You Never Can Tell" released in 1974 on Wizard Records. After they performed at the last Sunbury Pop Festival in 1975, Gunther Gorman joined on guitar. When Duncan was injured in a car accident, Hannaford switched to bass and guitarist Wayne Burt (later of Jo Jo Zep) was brought in. By September 1975 the band played their final show in Prahran's Reefer Cabaret.

=== 1975: Second separation ===
Wilson continued as a record producer on two more albums for Skyhooks, three albums for Jo Jo Zep and for other artists; he also performed as a founding member of Mondo Rock (1977–1991) and as a solo artist. Wilson was inducted into the ARIA Hall of Fame as an individual in 1989. Since 2006 he has been a regular judge on Seven Network's celebrity singing TV series It Takes Two. His solo 1989 song "Bed of Nails" was used as the theme for ABC-TV six-part series Bed of Roses starring Kerry Armstrong and broadcast from 10 May 2008.

Hannaford played in other bands and was a session guitarist including work for: Ross Hannaford Trio, The Black Sorrows, Ian Moss and Goanna. Young performed and recorded with numerous other bands including: Jo Jo Zep (1976–1981), The Rockin' Emus (1982), Cold Chisel (1983) and The Black Sorrows (1984–1985). His work for Jo Jo Zep provided Young with his second ARIA Hall of Fame induction in 2007. Duncan was also a session musician for various artists: Jane Clifton, The Black Sorrows and Ross Hannaford Trio.

=== 1994: With Skyhooks ===
Daddy Cool briefly reformed to support Skyhooks in a proposed 1994 stadium tour. Together, they released a four track CD-single with two new tracks "$64,000 Question" and "The Ballad of Oz" by Daddy Cool, combined with "Happy Hippy Hut" and "You Just Like Me 'Cos I'm Good in Bed" by Skyhooks. The reformation collapsed when the single stalled at number 35 on the ARIA Charts and the tour was downgraded to the pub circuit.

=== 2005–current ===
The band reformed in February 2005 to play at a 27 February 2005 benefit concert for victims of the 2004 tsunami at the Myer Music Bowl in Melbourne. A new Daddy Cool recording, "The Christmas Bug", was released for charity.

In 2006 Aztec Music released The Complete Daddy Cool, a double DVD collection, featuring the complete video of the 2005 Tsunami Benefit performance and a 90-minute documentary on the band. The set also features Bob Weis' 1972 documentary, a "Making Of ..." feature on Weis' film, a 13-minute feature "Hanna on Lead", and nearly 50 minutes of film clips and TV appearances. A new Daddy Cool album, The New Cool was released in 2006 on Liberation Records. This was their first album of new material since 1972; it also included the songs recorded in 1994 as part of the ill-fated DC / Skyhooks dual tour.

There have been subsequent reformation performances, including headlining the 2007 Moomba Festival and supporting the 2007 Australian tour by Mike Love's Beach Boys and Christopher Cross. Daddy Cool also played a one-off performance in Geelong on 31 October 2007, sharing the stage with former touring partners, Spectrum for the first time in over thirty years.

On 19 November 2014, the original band reformed for what became the final time with Daddy Cool inducted into the Music Victoria Awards Hall of Fame. The band performed a greatest hits setlist, including "Cherry Pie", 'Come Back Again', 'Eagle Rock' and 'Hi Honey Ho' amongst others at the sold-out awards night show. Wilson stated that this was the first time in over 30 years they had played those early hits.

Ross Wilson said of the award: "Daddy Cool first met, played, recorded and worked together in Melbourne and since those early days we’ve been inducted into the industry hall of fame in Australia. As "hometown heroes", The Age Music Victoria Hall of Fame means that little bit more because it's a cultural award, not a commercial one".

Guitarist Ross Hannaford died on 8 March 2016 aged 65 from cancer; he had been diagnosed with the condition a year earlier.

Bassist Wayne Duncan died on 4 December 2016, following a stroke.

== Band members ==
Current members

- Ross Wilson – lead vocals, guitar, harmonica (1970–1972, 1974–1975, 2005–present)
- Gary Young – drums, backing and occasional lead vocals (1970–1972, 1974–1975, 2005–present)

Past members

- Ross Hannaford – lead guitar, bass, backing and lead vocals (1970–1972, 1974–1975, 2005–2016, his death)
- Wayne Duncan – bass, backing vocals (1970–1972, 1974–1975, 2005–2016, his death)
- Jeremy Noone (Jeremy Killock) – saxophones, keyboards (1971–1972)
- Ian "Willy" Winter – rhythm guitar (1972)
- (Ian) Gunther Gorman – lead guitar (1975)
- Wayne Burt – guitar (1975)

Timeline

== Discography ==
=== Studio albums ===
List of studio albums, with peak chart positions
Title	Album details	Peak chart positions	Sales
Title	Album details	AUS	Sales
Daddy Who? Daddy Cool	Released: July 1971; Label: Sparmac (SPL 001)	1	AUS: 100,000
Sex, Dope, Rock'n'Roll: Teenage Heaven	Released: December 1971; Label: Sparmac (SPL 002)	15	
The New Cool	Released: November 2006; Label: Liberation (LIBCD8225.2)	—	

=== Live albums ===
List of live albums, with Australian chart positions
Title	Album details	Peak chart positions
Title	Album details	AUS
Daddy Cool Live! The Last Drive-In Movie Show	Released: September 1973; Label: Wizard (ZL 202)	34

=== Compilations ===
List of compilations, with Australian chart positions
Title	Album details	Peak chart positions	Sales/Certification
Title	Album details	AUS	Sales/Certification
The Best of Daddy Cool	Released: 1972; Label: Summit (SRA295.001)	—	
Daddy Cool's Golden Hits	Released: December 1972; Label: Sparmac (SPL 004)	9	
The Daddy Cool Story	Released: 1973; Label: Music for Pleasure (MFP 2-398024)	—	
Daddy Cool's Greatest Hits	Released: 1976; Label: Wizard (ZL 219)	52	
The Missing Masters	Released: 1981; Label: Wizard (ZL 241)	—	
Daddy's Coolest – The 20 Greatest Hits of Daddy Cool	Released: September 1982; Label: Wizard (WIZ 1002)	5	AUS: Platinum
Daddy's Coolest Vol. 2	Released: 1984; Label: Wizard (WIZLP 2003)	—	
The Daddy Cool Coolection	Released: 1984; Label: Axis (AX 260313)	—	
Totally Cool / The Essential Daddy Cool	Released: October 1992; Label: Mega (472377 2); Box set	—	
That's Cool – The Ultimate Collection	Released: 1999; Label: BMG (74321599192)	—	

=== Extended plays ===
List of EPs, with Australian chart positions
Title	EP details	Peak chart positions
Title	EP details	AUS
D.C.E.P.	Released: November 1971; Label: Sparmac (SPEP 1)	12
The D.C. Hits E.P.	Released: 1975; Label: Wizard (ZEP002)	—
The D.C. Hits E.P.	Released: 1980; Label: Wizard (ZEP002)	78
The 1992 Mixes	Released: June 1992; Label: Mega (657916 2)	104

=== Singles ===
List of singles, with Australian chart positions
Year	Title	Peak chart positions	Album
Year	Title	AUS	Album
1971	"Eagle Rock" / "Bom Bom"	1	Daddy Who?
1971	"Come Back Again" / "Just as Long as We're Together"	3	Daddy Who?
1971	"Hi Honey Ho" / "Don't Ever Leave Me"	16	Sex, Dope, Rock'n'Roll: Teenage Heaven
1972	"Teenage Blues" / "At the Rockhouse"	83	Golden Hits
1972	"I'll Never Smile Again" / "Daddy Rocks Off"	16	Golden Hits
1972	"Rock 'n' Roll Lady" / "Cadillacin'"	41	Golden Hits
1973	"Flash in My Head" / "Little Darlin'" / "Boy You're Paranoid"	—	Non-album singles
1973	"Duke of Earl" / "Jambalaya"	—	Non-album singles
1974	"All I Wanna Do Is Rock (part 1)" / "All I Wanna Do Is Rock (part 2)"	—	Non-album singles
1974	"The Boogie Man" / "I Was a Teenage Creature"	—	Non-album singles
1974	"You Never Can Tell" / "All I Wanna Do Is Rock"	—	Non-album singles
1981	"Eagle Rock" (live) / "Cadillacin'" (live)	17	Non-album singles
1982	"Come Back Again" (short vers.) / "Come Back Again" (long vers.)	—	Non-album singles
1989	"Eagle Rock" / "Come Back Again"	—	Non-album singles
1994	"The Ballad of Oz" / "Happy Hippy Hut" (by Skyhooks)	36	Non-album singles
2005	"The Christmas Bug"	—	Non-album singles
2006	"You Can't Have Everything"	—	The New Cool
2007	"They Built the Ute"	—	The New Cool

== Awards and nominations ==
=== ARIA Music Awards ===
The ARIA Music Awards is an annual awards ceremony that recognises excellence, innovation, and achievement across all genres of Australian music. They commenced in 1987. Daddy Cool were inducted into the Hall of Fame in 2006.

Year	Nominee / work	Award	Result
2006	Daddy Cool	ARIA Hall of Fame	inductee

=== Go-Set Pop Poll ===
The Go-Set Pop Poll was coordinated by teen-oriented pop music newspaper, Go-Set and was established in February 1966 and conducted an annual poll during 1966 to 1972 of its readers to determine the most popular personalities.

Year	Nominee / work	Award	Result
1971	themselves	Best Group	1st
1971	"Eagle Rock"	Best Australian Single	2nd
1971	Gary Young (Daddy Cool)	Best Drummer	3rd
1972	themselves	Best Group	5th

=== King of Pop Awards ===
The King of Pop Awards were voted by the readers of TV Week. The King of Pop award started in 1967 and ran through to 1978.

Year	Nominee / work	Award	Result
1971	themselves	Best Group	Won
1971	Gary Young (Daddy Cool)	Best Drummer	Won

=== Music Victoria Awards ===
The Music Victoria Awards are an annual awards night celebrating Victorian music. They commenced in 2005.

Year	Nominee / work	Award	Result	Ref.
2014	Daddy Cool	Hall of Fame	inductee	
