= Happy Hippy Hut =

Single by Skyhooks

from the album The Lost Album
- A-side: "The Ballad of Oz"
- Released: August 1994
- Recorded: May 1994
- Studio: Gotham Audio
- Length: 3:45
- Label: Mushroom
- Songwriter: Greg Macainsh
- Producer: Ross Fraser

Skyhooks singles chronology
"Tall Timber" (1990)	"Happy Hippy Hut" (1994)

"Happy Hippy Hut" is a song by Australian group, Skyhooks, released in August 1994 as a double-A sided split single with "The Ballad of Oz" by fellow Australian group, Daddy Cool. The single peaked at number 35 on the ARIA Singles Chart, remaining in that position for three consecutive weeks. Daddy Cool's lead singer, Ross Wilson, was Skyhooks' early record producer.

== Background and release ==
Early 1970s band Daddy Cool's lead singer, Ross Wilson, became Skyhooks' first record producer, in 1975. Both groups had performed at the Sunbury Pop Festival in 1974 and in 1975. In 1994, Skyhooks and Daddy Cool, both briefly reformed for a proposed stadium tour. Together they released a double-A sided single, "Happy Hippy Hut" / "The Ballad of Oz". However the tour was downgraded to the pub circuit.

== Track listing ==
CD single (D 11845)
No.	Title	Writer(s)	Length
1.	"Happy Hippy Hut" (by Skyhooks)	Greg Macainsh	3:45
2.	"You Just Like Me 'Cos I'm Good in Bed" (The Safe Sex Mix) (by Skyhooks)	Macainsh	3:46
3.	"The Ballad of Oz" (by Daddy Cool)	Ross Wilson	3:06
4.	"$64,000 Question" (by Daddy Cool)	C Shears, E Sharpe	2:10

== Charts ==
Chart performance for "Happy Hippy Hut"
Chart (1994)	Peak position
Australia (ARIA)	35
