= Billy & Lillie =

American pop vocal duo

Billy & Lillie were an American pop vocal duo, composed of Billy Ford (William T. Ford; March 9, 1919 or 1925 – March 1983) and Lillie Bryant (born February 14, 1940, Newburgh, New York).

== Career ==
Billy Ford was born in Bloomfield, New Jersey; many sources give his birth year as 1925 (or 1927), but blues researchers Bob Eagle and Eric LeBlanc state 1919. He was a trumpeter, who recorded as a bandleader and accompanist for many labels from the mid-1940s. He recorded two singles for United Records, credited to Billy Ford & the Thunderbirds, without attaining much commercial success.

Billy & Lillie recorded for Swan Records in the late 1950s, and charted three hit singles in the United States, two of them written by the songwriter and record producer Bob Crewe, and producer Frank Slay, known as Frank C. Slay, Jr. Crewe later became one of the most successful songwriters and producers in history, having produced or written most of the songs recorded by The Four Seasons. Frank C. Slay, Jr., co-wrote several songs with Bob Crewe, including "Tallahassee Lassie" by Freddy Cannon. He would also, later in 1967, produce the hit "Incense and Peppermints" by The Strawberry Alarm Clock.

The first single, "La Dee Dah" (written by Crewe), was the only one of them to hit the Top 10 on the Billboard chart, peaking at No. 9. It was released on Swan Records, catalog reference #4002. It sold over 1,000,000 copies and was awarded a gold disc. When they performed "La Dee Dah" for Dick Clark's American Bandstand, Clark liked their song so much that he asked the songwriters to write another song. Crewe and Slay came up with their third single release, "Lucky Ladybug".

The Billy & Lillie version of "Lucky Ladybug" was a # 14 ranked hit position wise on the Billboard chart, released by Swan Records (catalog # 4020). Both "La Dee Dah" and "Lucky Ladybug" referred in their lyrics to a number of other recent popular hits, a formula first used by Larry Williams in his hit "Short Fat Fannie". "Lucky Ladybug" was later covered by The Four Seasons and appeared on the B-side of their hit "Walk Like a Man" (1963), as was "La Dee Dah", on their first album titled "Sherry". Ford died in 1983 (though some sources suggest 1985). Bryant returned to her hometown of Newburgh, New York, and became a community activist. She was the Democratic candidate for mayor of Newburgh in 2007. She lost the election to the Republican candidate by 150 votes.

== Singles ==
- "La Dee Dah" (1958) U.S. Billboard Hot 100 #9
- "Bells, Bells, Bells (The Bell Song)" (1959) U.S. #88
- "Lucky Ladybug" (1959) U.S. #14
