= Silhouettes (The Rays song) =

1957 single by The Rays

Single by the Rays
- B-side: "Daddy Cool"
- Released: 1957
- Recorded: 1957
- Genre: Doo-wop
- Length: 2:45
- Label: XYZ; Cameo
- Songwriters: Bob Crewe, Frank Slay
- Producers: Bob Crewe, Frank Slay

"Silhouettes" is a song made famous by the American doo-wop group the Rays in 1957, peaking at number three on the US Billboard Hot 100. A competing version by the Diamonds was also successful. In 1965 it was a number 5 hit in the US for Herman's Hermits, and in 1990 it was a number 10 hit in the UK for Cliff Richard.

== Writing and Rays version ==
In May 1957, songwriter Bob Crewe saw a couple embracing through a windowshade as he passed on a train. He quickly set about turning the image into a song. Frank Slay, who owned the small Philadelphia record label XYZ with Crewe, added lyrics, and they soon had a complete song ready to record.

The story has frequently been reported that Slay heard the Rays audition for Cameo-Parkway Records, for which he worked, and immediately decided that they were the perfect group for "Silhouettes". However, Slay and Crewe were actually already familiar with the group, as "Silhouettes" was their third single with them. Neil Arena of the original Mello-Kings maintains that Slay and Crewe had first written the song for their group, but since they were away on tour and unable to record it when Crewe offered it to Herald Records boss Al Silver, the writers opted for the Rays instead.

The song received a break when popular Philadelphia disc jockey Hy Lit fell asleep with a stack of newly released records on his record player. "Silhouettes" happened to be the last to play, and so it repeated until he woke up. He began to play the song on his show. It became popular enough that Cameo-Parkway picked it up for national distribution, and it eventually reached number 3 on both the R&B Best Sellers chart and Billboard Top 100, while also hitting the top five on both the sales and airplay charts. It was the group's only top 40 hit.

== The Diamonds version ==
The Canadian pop group the Diamonds, who had experienced success with cover versions of other doo-wop records, quickly put out their own version of the song. They even used the same song, "Daddy Cool", on the B-side of their record as the Rays had. Their version received widespread radio play in a heavily segregated radio market, also reaching the top ten of the Billboard airplay chart. However, it did not reach Billboard's sales chart, and only hit number 60 on the Top 100.

== Herman's Hermits version ==
Herman's Hermits recorded the song in 1965 after hearing it on American Armed Forces Radio. It reached number 1 in Canada's RPM charts. It became their third hit in the "British Invasion" of the US, reaching number 5 on the Billboard Hot 100 and also reached number 3 in the UK. Information from Peter Noone and others indicates that guitarist Vic Flick played on the track, and not Jimmy Page as previously thought.

== Cliff Richard version ==
"Silhouettes"

Single by Cliff Richard

from the album From a Distance: The Event
- B-side: "The Winner"
- Released: 13 August 1990
- Recorded: 16–17 June 1989
- Genre: Pop
- Label: EMI
- Songwriters: Bob Crewe; Frank Slay
- Producer: Cliff Richard

Cliff Richard singles chronology
"Stronger Than That" (1990)	"Silhouettes" (1990)	"From a Distance" (1990)

Music video
- "Silhouettes" on YouTube

British singer and actor Cliff Richard released a live version as a single in 1990 by EMI, reaching number six in Luxembourg and number 10 on the UK Singles Chart. It was the first single culled from his 1990 live album From a Distance: The Event. The single and album were live recordings of two special concerts celebrating Richard's 30th anniversary of his music career. Titled The Event, the concerts were held at the Original Wembley Stadium with an audience of 72,000 each evening on the 16 and 17 June 1989.

=== Charts ===
Chart (1990)	Peak position
Europe (Eurochart Hot 100)	32
Germany (GfK)	51
Ireland (IRMA)	13
Luxembourg (Radio Luxembourg)	6
UK Singles (OCC)	10

== Legacy ==
Doo-wop group The Silhouettes (known for their hit "Get A Job") were named after the song.

According to John Lennon, the Beatles' song "No Reply" (1964) was inspired by "Silhouettes".

The reggae artist Dennis Brown recorded a cover in 1972.

The song was featured in the 2005 jukebox musical Jersey Boys as well as in the film version.

== See also ==
- Billboard year-end top 50 singles of 1957
- List of CHUM number-one singles of 1957
