= Daddy Cool (The Rays song) =

Single by the Rays
- A-side: "Silhouettes"
- B-side: "Daddy Cool"
- Released: 1957
- Genre: Rock
- Label: Cameo-Parkway
- Songwriters: Frank Slay, Bob Crewe

"Daddy Cool" is a song by American doo-wop group the Rays and was released on Cameo Records as the B-side of their 1957 single "Silhouettes". It became a No. 3 hit on the Billboard Pop singles chart. The song was written by Bob Crewe and Frank Slay, who had also written the A-side, "Silhouettes". The song became a No. 1 single on the Australian singles charts when covered by novelty band Drummond in 1971, and it remained there for seven weeks. UK cover band Darts also had a hit single with the song, which reached No. 6 in 1977.

== Cover versions ==
Fellow 1950s doo-wop band the Diamonds, from Canada, covered both sides of the Rays' single "Silhouettes"/"Daddy Cool" in the same year (1957) and saw their version reach No. 10. UK artists Darts' first ever studio recording was a medley of "Daddy Cool" and "The Girl Can't Help It", which they released as a single in 1977. It peaked at No. 6. Guy "Daddy Cool" Darrell released a single on the Warwick label in 1961 entitled "Daddy Cool, Daddy Cool (Daddy Cool, Cool, Cool)". However, it is unrelated to the Rays record except for having been inspired by the title. The Guy Darrell record was written by Gluch-D'Agostino. In 1989, Berkeley pop-punk band Sweet Baby performed a version on their sole album, It's a Girl. Also covered in 1958 by Linden, NJ band the Bonnevilles, with Wayne Tevlin on lead vocals. Tevlin also sang lead on the 1963 release of "One Night" by the Four Kings and on "Sea of Misery", released in 1968 by the Most.

=== Australian versions ===
While it is thought that the 1970s Australian rock band Daddy Cool named themselves after the song, leader Ross Wilson has stated the band was named before he first heard the song. They performed their cover version whilst touring Australia, including the Myponga Festival (60 km south of Adelaide, South Australia). In January 1971, they recorded a studio version for their debut album Daddy Who? Daddy Cool, which was released in July 1971.

It was covered by another Australian band, Drummond, who recorded the song in a Chipmunks style and released it as a novelty single in 1971. Already in the national singles charts, staying at No. 1 for ten weeks, was Daddy Cool's record-breaking hit "Eagle Rock", which was displaced by Drummond's tribute single "Daddy Cool". "Drummond" was a rotating house pseudonym employed by Festival Records to release novelty records by a series of musicians. This particular Drummond single was the work of the band Allison Gros, consisting of Graeham Goble, Russ Johnson and John Mower. They moved to Melbourne and subsequently recorded their own material as Mississippi. With the addition of Beeb Birtles, they evolved into the Little River Band.

== Charts ==
=== Darts ===
Chart (1977–1978)	Peak position
Belgium (Ultratop 50 Flanders)	9
Ireland (IRMA)	10
Netherlands (Single Top 100)	7
Sweden (Sverigetopplistan)	3
UK Singles (Official Charts)	6
