= Mark Gillespie (Australian musician) =

Australian singer-songwriter (1950–2021)

- Born: Mark Ignatius Gillespie; 20 January 1950
- Died: 11 November 2021 (aged 71) Dhaka, Bangladesh
- Genres: Pop, rock, soul, funk
- Occupation: Singer-songwriter
- Instruments: Vocals, acoustic, electric & slide guitars, piano, organ, synths, mandolin, bass
- Years active: 1970s–1990s
- Labels: Wheatley Records, Mushroom Records

Mark Ignatius Gillespie (20 January 1950 – 11 November 2021) was an Australian singer-songwriter and musician.

Gillespie studied architecture at Melbourne University. He first became known as a performer in Melbourne clubs in the mid-1970s. He also wrote poetry and short stories and co-founded Outback Press. His first recordings appeared on a compilation album, Debutantes, prepared by Ross Wilson on Oz Records. His debut album, Only Human, appeared in 1980 on the Wheatley label set up by Glenn Wheatley. Gillespie played guitars, synthesisers, keyboards, piano and mandolin on the album and also used several of the best-known Australian session musicians. It was widely played on FM radio in Australia, reaching number 48 on the national album charts. Reluctant to promote his recordings, Gillespie made his first visit to Bangladesh around this time. He returned to Australia in 1982 to record a follow-up album, Sweet Nothing, which reached number 33 and included the songs "River of Blood" and the prescient "Night and Day". He also toured in the 1980s with such performers as Tom Waits, Maria Muldaur and Rodriguez. His third album, Ring of Truth, was issued by Wheatley in 1983. The label also issued a compilation album of his recordings, Small Mercies, in 1984. His early albums were later reissued on CD with bonus tracks from singles, B-sides and demos.

Disillusioned with the music business, Gillespie returned to Bangladesh as a volunteer worker. In 1992, he briefly returned to Australia to perform again and released his final album, Flame. He gave up the music business thereafter and settled in Bangladesh, at first working in a children's home in Dhaka and then setting up a refuge for vulnerable women and children in Sreepur. He married a local woman named Morium and, according to one former associate, "lived in a typical rural village ... with none of the trappings of western life."

After some years of declining health due to cellulitis, and a few months after his wife's death, Gillespie died in hospital in Dhaka on 11 November 2021.

== Discography ==
- Only Human (1980)
- Sweet Nothing (1982)
- Ring of Truth (1983)
- Small Mercies (Best of) (1984)
- Flame (1992)
