= Bobby & Laurie =

Australian pop duo

- Also known as: Laurie Allen and Bobby Bright
- Origin: Melbourne, Victoria, Australia
- Genres: Beat pop
- Years active: 1964–1967; 1969–1971
- Labels: Go!!; Alberts/Parlophone; RCA; Fable; Astor; Raven; J&B
- Past members: Laurie Allen; Bobby Bright

Bobby & Laurie were an Australian beat pop duo of the 1960s, with Laurie Allen (1942–2002) on vocals, guitar and keyboards and Bobby Bright (3 February 1945 – 19 July 2025) on vocals and guitar. Their regular backing band were the Rondells. The duo's most popular singles were, "I Belong with You" (1964) and "Hitch Hiker" (1966). Their debut album, Bobby and Laurie (1965), was the first for independent label, Go!!. The duo disbanded in 1967 to pursue solo careers and briefly reformed from 1969 to 1971.

== History ==
Lawrence Frank Allen was born in Melbourne on 9 March 1942 to Jack and Edna Allen. On vocals and guitar Allen formed the Three Jays, in the late 1950s, with Jimmy Braggs on piano accordion and Johnny MacGaw on drums. He followed with stints in the Lories (c. 1958) and then the Roulettes (1958–59), a long-running Melbourne revue band. From 1959 to 1961, he was lead guitarist for Malcolm Arthur & the Knights, and in 1962 he was lead singer and organist of a previously instrumental group, the Blue Jays. At the end of 1963, the Blue Jays became the Fabulous Blue Jays, the backing band for singer, Tony Worsley. Allen then rejoined the Roulettes.

Robert Harry Bright was born in Watford, England on 3 February 1945, and arrived in Adelaide in April 1954, via SS Strathnaver, at age nine. His mother Elsie May Bright née Jackson (1915–2001) was a domestic worker, who had divorced her husband and had sole custody of their son before emigrating. Bright worked as a solo artist in Adelaide in the early 1960s. During 1961 he sang pop vocals at Surfside Dance for Teenagers, Henley Town Hall, each Friday night. Bright moved to Melbourne and released two singles on the W&G Records label in 1963, "Girls Never Notice Me" (with the Strangers) and "Defeated by His Heart", before joining the Roulettes later in that year.

Former vocalist of the Roulettes, Ron Blackmore became an artist manager in the early 1960s. Allen and Bright, who performed separately as soloists, and with the Roulettes, all joined Blackmore's management company. In March 1964, Allen made his first solo TV appearance, on Graham Kennedy's In Melbourne Tonight. Later that year, both appeared as solo artists on The Go!! Show, which was produced by DYT Productions (owned by Horrie Dargie, Arthur Young, Johnny Tillbrook). They soon established a duo, Laurie Allen and Bobby Bright. They became regulars on The Go!! Show, alongside the Strangers, and were paid £ 50 per appearance.

As Bobby & Laurie (or Bobby and Laurie), the duo issued the first single for Go!! Records, "I Belong with You", in August 1964. It was written by Allen. The label was established by DYT Productions in association with their The Go!! Show. "I Belong with You" was produced by English-born producer, Roger Savage, who had arrived in Australia from London where he had worked with the Rolling Stones and Dusty Springfield. It reached number one on the local Melbourne charts for two weeks and peaked at No. 9 on the Kent Music Report (KMR)'s Australian singles chart. Allen won an Australian Record Award for Best Composition for that song in 1965.

Bobby & Laurie regularly worked with a backing band, the Rondells (previously the Lincolns and then the Silhouettes), which had an initial line-up of Bernie O'Brien on lead guitar, John Sullivan on rhythm guitar, Dennis Tucker on bass guitar and Dennis Collins on drums. The duo toured Australia, supported by a new line-up of the Rondells, with Sullivan joined by Roger Treble on lead guitar (ex-Silhouettes, Lincolns), Wayne Duncan on bass guitar (ex-Lincolns) and Gary Young on drums (ex-Silhouettes, Lincolns). Duncan and Young later formed the rhythm section of 1970's group Daddy Cool. Bobby & Laurie performed as Tweedledum and Tweedledee in a Christmas pantomime of Alice in Wonderland at Melbourne's Tivoli Theatre, in December 1964.

In early 1965 the pair appeared on TV music show, Teen Scene, on Australian Broadcasting Corporation (ABC), where they were dragged off the stage by screaming female fans. They appeared in the premiere episode of Channel 0's children's program, Magic Circle Club on 23 January, playing characters Twoddle and Boddle. They released three more singles on Go!! Records during 1965, "Someone" (which reached No. 20 on KMR), "Judy Green" (No. 28) and "Crazy Country Hop" (No. 54). In May 1965 they supported a national tour by the Dave Clark Five, the Seekers and Tommy Quickly. In June Bobby & Laurie and the Rondells co-headlined a show with the Easybeats at the Canberra Theatre. Later that year they supported the American singer, P. J. Proby on his national tour.

In 1966 the duo switched to the Albert Productions label, for the singles, "Sweet and Tender Romance" (February) and their version of Roger Miller's 1962 B-side "Hitch Hiker" (March). which gave them a national number-one hit for five weeks in May and June. They also changed management from Blackmore to Mal Fisher. On the strength of "Hitch Hiker", the Australian Broadcasting Corporation gave them their own TV show, It's a Gas – later re-branded as Dig We Must. The show was designed to attract a more sophisticated adult market, but lost the duo much of their teen appeal, which led to friction between the two artists. After recording their last album Exposaic (1966), the pair officially split in early 1967 after three years together.

Bobby & Laurie reunited on a radio program in February 1968 and returned to the charts with their cover version of the country music song, "The Carroll County Accident" (1969). It was followed by "Looking Through the Eyes of Love" (1970), but they split again by late 1971. In the following years, the pair performed occasionally as Bobby & Laurie until their final Don't Let the Music Die concert on 1 June 2002 at the Kingston City Hall.

== Solo careers ==
After the break-up, Allen continued performing as a soul revue act initially known as Dice, which was later renamed the Laurie Allen Revue. Allen became a country music singer-songwriter and issued solo albums, Once Upon a Song (1972), Any Other Man (1976) and Me 'N' Jack Daniels (1997). He had collaborated with indigenous boxer and country music singer Lionel Rose on Rose's second album, Jackson's Track (1971), including writing the title track. Bright worked in cabaret as well as acting. He appeared on TV police drama, Homicide. In 1968, he became a disc-jockey and radio presenter at Melbourne radio station 3XY. In 1973, Bright performed as the Doctor in the Melbourne stage production of Tommy.

Laurie Allen died from a heart attack on 13 June 2002, at the age of 60. Music journalist Christie Eliezer observed that he was described as "the archetypal gentle soul". Fellow country music artist Keith Glass remembered Allen, as "a sweet soul and a contributor throughout his life to the illustrious musical history" of Australia.

Bobby Bright died in Melbourne, Australia on 19 July 2025, at the age of 80.

== Discography ==
=== Singles ===
Year	Single	Chart Positions
Year	Single	AUS
1964	"I Belong with You"	9
1965	"Someone"	20
1965	"Judy Green"	28
1965	"Crazy Country Hop"	54
1966	"Sweet and Tender Romance"	49
1966	"Hitch Hiker"	1
1966	"High Noon"	14
1966	"First Street Blues" (with The Rondells)	46
1969	"The Carroll County Accident"	30
1970	"Through the Eyes of Love"	13

=== Albums ===
- Bobby and Laurie – 1965
- Hitch Hiker – 1966
- Exposaic – 1966

== See also ==
- List of number-one singles in Australia during the 1960s
