= Cherry Pie (Joe Josea song) =

Single by Skip & Flip
- B-side: "(I'll Quit) Cryin' over You"
- Released: March 1960
- Genre: Pop
- Length: 2:02
- Label: Brent
- Songwriter: Joe Josea

Skip & Flip singles chronology
"Fancy Nancy" (1959)	"Cherry Pie" (1960)	"Hully Gully Cha Cha Cha" (1960)

"Cherry Pie" is a song written by Joe Josea and originally performed by Marvin & Johnny in 1954 as the B-side to their single "Tick Tock".

== Other versions ==
- Six years after its first recording, a version was released by the duo Skip & Flip. This version reached number 11 on the Billboard pop chart and number 27 on the US R&B chart in 1960. Skip & Flip's version was ranked number 79 on Billboard magazine's Top Hot 100 songs of 1960.
- Jess Conrad released a version of the song as a single in 1960 which reached number 39 on the UK Singles Chart.
- Dave Bartholomew and His Orchestra released a version of the song as the B-side to their 1964 single "The Monkey Speaks His Mind".
- Daddy Cool released a version of the song on their 1971 album, Daddy Who? Daddy Cool.
- The Hagers released a version of the song as a single in 1974.
- George Carlin sang a version of the song on Arsenio Hall in the 80s.

== In popular culture ==
- Marvin and Johnny's version of the song was mentioned in The Penguins' 1963 metasong, "Memories of El Monte".
