= Eagle Rock (song) =

Single by Daddy Cool

from the album Daddy Who? Daddy Cool
- A-side: "Eagle Rock"
- B-side: "Bom Bom"
- Released: 1971
- Genre: Australian rock, blues rock
- Length: 4:09
- Label: Sparmac; Wizard
- Songwriter: Ross Wilson
- Producer: Robie Porter

Daddy Cool singles chronology
"Eagle Rock" (1971)	"Come Back Again" (1971)

"Eagle Rock" is a song by Australian rock band Daddy Cool, released as their debut single in 1971 on the Sparmac record label. It went on to become the best-selling Australian single of the year, achieving gold status in eleven weeks, and remaining at No. 1 on the Kent Music Report for a (then) record ten weeks. "Eagle Rock" also spent 17 weeks at the No. 1 spot on the Melbourne Top 40 Singles Chart. The song was re-released by Wizard Records in 1982 and reached No. 17 on the Australian singles chart.

In New Zealand, the song has charted three times. In 1971, it reached No. 17 on Listener's single chart; in 1986, it reached No. 19 on the RIANZ Singles Chart; and in 1990, it topped the RIANZ chart for four weeks, staying in the top 50 for fifteen weeks and achieving gold status. The accompanying promotional video, directed by Chris Löfvén, shows the band in locations around Melbourne. Over the years, "Eagle Rock" has been regarded as one of the most influential and acclaimed Australian songs.

== Background ==
Guitarist, vocalist and the song's writer Ross Wilson was living and performing in London when he wrote the song. He explained his inspiration for the song:

It came from a Sunday Times liftout magazine A-Z on music. In the before blues section there was an evocative photo of rural black Americans dancing in a dirt poor juke joint—the caption was along the lines of "some negroes 'cut the pigeon wing' and 'do the eagle rock'".

— Ross Wilson, 2001

"Eagle Rock" was a 1920s black dance performed with the arms outstretched and the body rocking from side to side. The 1913 song "Ballin' the Jack" has the line "Stretch your lovin' arms straight out in space / Then do the Eagle Rock with style and grace".

== Influence and legacy ==
English musician Elton John toured Australia during 1972 and was so inspired by "Eagle Rock" that, with lyricist Bernie Taupin, he wrote "Crocodile Rock". The cover of John's 1973 album Don't Shoot Me I'm Only the Piano Player, which featured "Crocodile Rock", has a photo of Taupin wearing a "Daddy Who?" promotional badge. Taupin is also seen wearing Daddy Cool memorabilia on albums Tumbleweed Connection and Honky Chateau.

In 1998, Australia Post issued a special-edition set of twelve stamps celebrating the early years of Australian Rock 'n' Roll, featuring Australian hit songs of the late 1950s, the 1960s and the early 1970s. One of the songs featured in the collection was "Eagle Rock".

In May 2001, Australasian Performing Right Association (APRA) celebrated its 75th anniversary by naming the Best Australian Songs of all time, as decided by a 100-strong industry panel, "Eagle Rock" was ranked second, behind the Easybeats' "Friday on My Mind". In 2010, "Eagle Rock" was added to the National Film and Sound Archive's Sounds of Australia registry. In January 2018, as part of Triple M's "Ozzest 100", the 'most Australian' songs of all time, "Eagle Rock" was ranked number 21.

In 2005, "Eagle Rock" appeared as backing music on commercials for "Victoria - The Place to Be". It was also used in the opening scenes of the 2005 horror movie Wolf Creek, in the 2011 Australian film Red Dog and in the television series Dossa and Joe.

Since the early 1990s, "Eagle Rock" has been played at home games for the Sydney-based Manly-Warringah Sea Eagles rugby league team and is unofficially the club's theme song. The song was also played to the crowd after Manly's Grand Final wins in 2008 and 2011. Ross Wilson actually performed the song as part of the pre-game entertainment at the 1996 ARL Grand Final in which Manly won their 6th rugby league premiership. The song is also played at West Coast Eagles games at Optus Stadium in the Australian Football League and the Eagles' Rick 'The Rock' Eagle mascot character is also named after the song. The song was also played at the MCG after the Eagles victory in the 2018 AFL Grand Final.

In 2025, the song placed 45 in the Triple J Hottest 100 of Australian Songs.

=== Tradition ===
The song is also the basis of a tradition practiced among a small group of Australians for decades. Whenever the song is played at an event or a public bar, they (particularly the males) congregate on the dance floor where they unstrap their belts and hobble around singing the song with their trousers around their ankles. Ross Wilson of Daddy Cool, although perplexed about the origin of the practice has observed,'... I suppose it's got the silliness that was part of the charm of Daddy Cool.'

It is commonly attributed to a group of mining engineering students, who at the time were residents of St John's College within the University of Queensland campus. St John's has had the eagle as its mascot since its founding in the early 20th century which lends support to their claim that they began the practice. In St Leo's, the memory (1992) by Michael A. Head, the author comments on the heated confrontations that occurred during his time at St Leo's college (a neighbouring residential college) between the residents of each college relating to this issue, with St Leo's claiming it as their own.

== Video ==
Frame capture from colourised section of "Eagle Rock". NFSA #1105254

The promotional film clip for "Eagle Rock" was shot on 16mm black-and-white film in 1971 by 23-year-old Melbourne filmmaker Chris Löfvén. It shows the band in Melbourne locations including South Melbourne, St. Kilda's Aussie Burger Bar opposite Luna Park and live shots from the 1971 Myponga Festival held in South Australia.

A rarely seen experimental colourised version of the film clip was found and restored by the National Film and Sound Archive of Australia (NFSA) in 2013. The newly discovered version features a 37-second section using colour filters printed onto colour film stock. This particular print, though never intended for screening, was possibly seen by teenage audiences of 0-10 Network (now Network Ten) pop music program Happening '71 throughout 1971.

== Track listings ==
All tracks were written by Ross Wilson unless otherwise indicated.

7-inch vinyl

1. "Eagle Rock" – 4:09
2. "Bom Bom" (Ross Wilson, Ross Hannaford) – 2:33

12-inch vinyl

1. "Eagle Rock – 4:07
2. "Daddy Rocks Off" – 4:34
3. "Bom Bom" (Wilson, Hannaford) – 2:34

== Personnel ==
Daddy Cool

- Wayne Duncan – bass guitar, backing vocals
- Ross Hannaford – lead guitar, backing vocals
- Ross Wilson – lead vocals, rhythm guitar
- Gary Young – drums, backing vocals

Additional credits

- Robie Porter – producer
- Roger Savage – engineer

== Charts ==
=== Weekly charts ===
Chart (1971)	Peak position
Australia (Kent Music Report)	1
New Zealand (Listener)	17

Chart (1982)	Peak position
Australia (Kent Music Report)	17

Chart (1986)	Peak position
New Zealand (Recorded Music NZ)	19

Chart (1990)	Peak position
New Zealand (Recorded Music NZ)	1

=== Year-end charts ===
Chart (1971)	Position
Australia (Kent Music Report)	1

Chart (1990)	Position
New Zealand (RIANZ)	12

== Certifications ==
Region	Certification	Certified units/sales
New Zealand (RMNZ)	2× Platinum	60,000^{‡}
^{‡} Sales+streaming figures based on certification alone.

== Parodies ==
Australian comedian and singer Kevin Bloody Wilson wrote a parody of the song, "Me Beer's Cut Off", for his 2009 album Excess All Areas.
