= Ross Hannaford =

Australian musician (1950–2016)

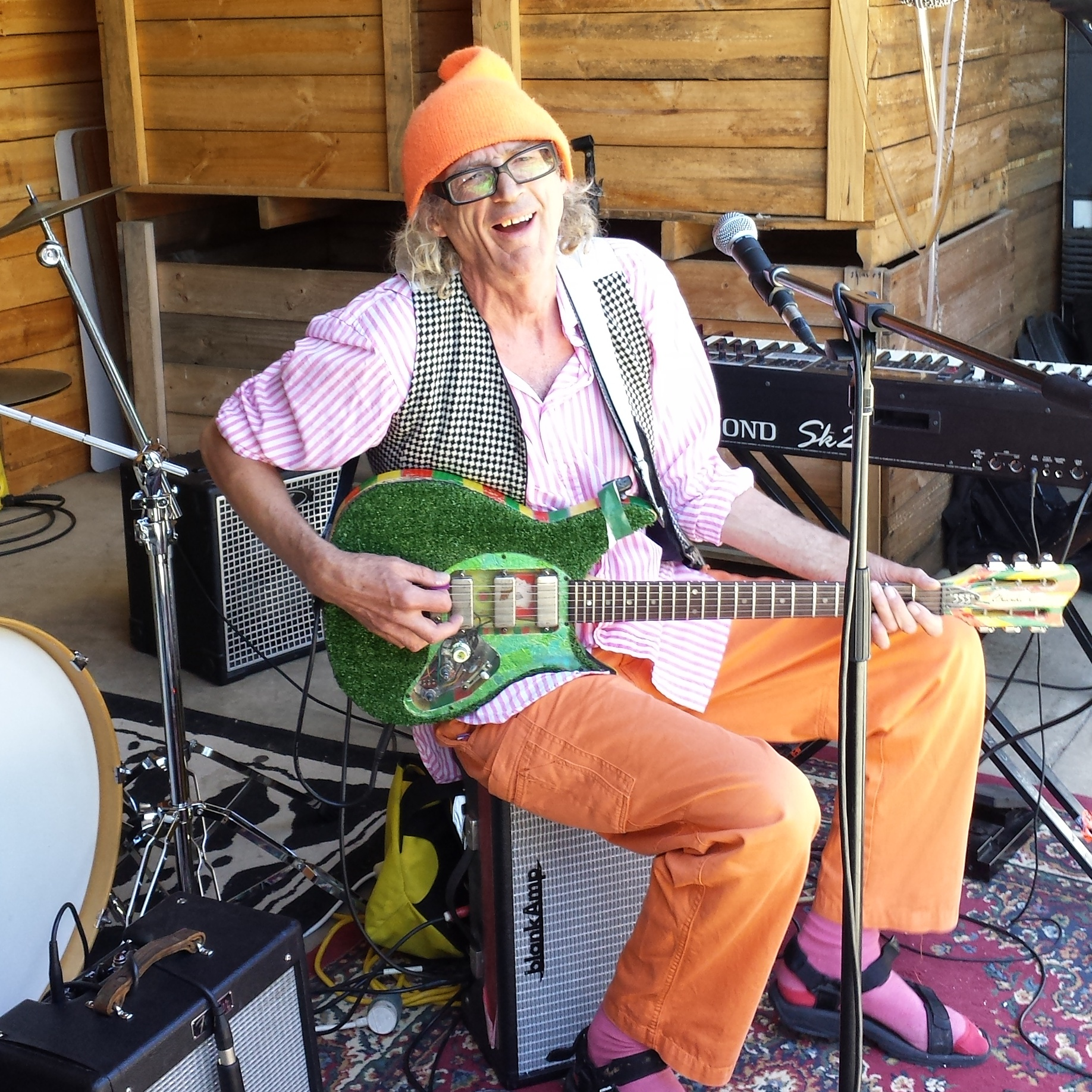
- Hannaford at Wolesley Wines, 2015

Background information
- Also known as: Hanna
- Born: Ross Andrew Hannaford; 1 December 1950; Newcastle, New South Wales, Australia
- Died: 8 March 2016 (aged 65) Melbourne, Victoria, Australia
- Genres: Rock and roll, progressive rock
- Occupations: Guitarist, songwriter
- Instruments: Vocals, guitar, harmonica
- Years active: 1960s–2015
- Labels: Sparmac, Wizard, Sony/BMG, Liberation
- Formerly of: The Pink Finks, The Party Machine, Sons of the Vegetal Mother, Daddy Cool, Mighty Kong, Dianna Kiss, Ross Hannaford Trio, Mark Gillespie
- Website: rosshannaford.com

Ross Andrew Hannaford (1 December 1950 – 8 March 2016) was an Australian musician, active in numerous local bands. He was often referred to by his nickname "Hanna". Widely regarded as one of the country's finest rock guitarists, he was best known for his long collaboration with singer-songwriter Ross Wilson, which began as teenagers, with The Pink Finks and forming the seminal early '70s Australian rock band Daddy Cool. Hannaford died of cancer after being diagnosed a year earlier.

== The Pink Finks ==
Ross Andrew Hannaford was born in Newcastle on 1 December 1950, his family moved to Melbourne one year later. Hannaford and Wilson first teamed up in the hometown of Melbourne in early 1965, in the R&B band The Pink Finks, which enjoyed moderate local success. This was followed by the more progressively oriented The Party Machine, They released a single "You've All Gotta Go" in 1969; their printed songbooks were confiscated and burned by the Victorian Vice Squad for being obscene and seditious. The Party Machine disbanded in 1969, with Wilson travelling to London.

== Sons of the Vegetal Mother ==
After a short stint in the UK, Wilson returned to Australia and reunited with Hannaford ca. 1970 in the even more avant garde Sons of the Vegetal Mother, which embodied Wilson's enthusiasm for the music of Frank Zappa.

== Daddy Cool ==
This band eventually evolved into Daddy Cool, which had started out as an informal offshoot of the Vegetals but soon overtook it. After the release of their hugely successful debut single "Eagle Rock" and their debut LP Daddy Who? Daddy Cool, the band became one of the most popular and successful rock acts of the decade, breaking all previous sales records for an Australian act.

Hannaford's unique guitar stylings won wide praise from critics and his goofy stage presence, distinctive baritone voice and trademark 'helicopter' cap made him a favourite with fans. He also wrote several of the group's songs and co-designed the sleeve of their second album, Sex, Dope, Rock'n'Roll: Teenage Heaven.

- 1970–1972: Original line-up
- 1972–1974: Daddy Cool separates
- 1974–1975: First reformation
- 1975: Second separation

== Mighty Kong ==
After the first split of Daddy Cool at the end of 1972, Wilson and Hannaford formed the short-lived Mighty Kong with former members of Spectrum and Company Caine and they recorded one album, All I Wanna Do Is Rock, but they split just after the record was released.

=== Mighty Kong Band Members ===
- Ross Wilson – chief vocals, pignose guitar on "Homesick & Horny"
- Ross Hannaford – guitar, deep throat
- Russell Smith – guitar, lead vocals on "Some Other New Address"
- Tim Partridge – bass guitar
- Ray Arnott – drums

== Billy T ==
During the mid-1970s Ross became a devotee of Satguru Maharaj Ji and the Divine Light Mission. In 1977 he travelled to the USA to attend various religious festivals. While in the US he formed One Foundation with Joe Creighton (bass; from Billy T) to play at Mission conventions. On his return to Australia, Ross, Russell Smith and Joe Creighton then formed Billy T.

=== Billy T Band Members ===
Ross Hannaford – Guitar, Vocals [ The Pink Finks (1965–1967) – The Party Machine (1967–1969) – Sons of the Vegetal Mother (1970) – Daddy Cool (1970–1972, 1974–1975, 1994, 2005–2016) – Mighty Kong (1972–1973) – Billy T (1975–1977) – Diana Kiss – Ross Hannaford Trio (1996) – Hey Gringo (2000) – solo (2015) ]

Joe Creighton – Bass, Vocals [ The Sands (1967–1969) – Dolls House (UK: 1969–1970) – Melissa (1970–1972) – Band of Angels (1973–1975) – Billy T (1975–1978) – Mark Gillespie Band (1978-early 80's) – The Black Sorrows (1983) – Tim Finn touring band (1984) – Venetta Fields – John Farnham touring band (late 80's) – Olivia Newton-John touring band – Kylie Minogue touring band – The Joe Creighton Band – The Revelators (early 90's) – The Black Sorrows ] www.joecreighton.com

Mick Holden – Drums, Vocals [ The Mixtures (1971) – Hot City Bump Band (1973–1976) – Billy T (1977–1978) ]

Geoff Maling – Percussion

Russell Smith – Guitar, Vocals [Com-Pac (1969–1970) – Company Caine (1970–1971, 1975) – Duck – Metropolis – Gulliver's Travels (1976)- Billy T (1977–1978) – The Embers ]

Neal McPherson – Keyboards

The Billy T catalogue is available through Laneway Music on all digital platforms.

thttps://www.lanewaymusic.com.au/billyt

Billy T's promo-video for the single '(Gotta) Keep On Dancing' (May, 1977). Available at https://www.youtube.com/watch?v=Pp1QtrkKU9I Artist Origin: Queensland, Australia Artist Location: Melbourne, VIC, Australia Track: (Gotta) Keep On Dancing Release Date: May 1977 Chart Position: Composer: R. Smith, S. Smith, M. Holden Produced by: Peter Dawkins, Russell Kinross-Smith, Billy T Label: CBS Featured on: non-album single Footage Information: A Chris Löfvén Production Artist(s) link: https://www.lanewaymusic.com.au/billyt http://theaussiemusicblog.blogspot.co...

== Bamboo and Lucky Dog ==
On his return to Australia, after attending various religious festivals in 1977, Ross formed reggae bands Bamboo and Lucky Dog.

The original Lucky Dog lineup consisted of Margot Barrett (Vocals; ex Small Axe), Martin Kellock (rhythm guitar and vocals), Mike Krelle (keyboards), Wayne Duncan; bass; ex-Daddy Cool), and Geoff Hassall (drums; ex-Paul Madigan and the Humans). The band issued one independent single, Why Do Fools Fall In Love?/Mr Bones', Wake Up', in December 1980. The Band also released a mini-album in 1980 titled Ross Hannaford's Lucky Dog – Lucky Dog.

In July 1980, Lucky Dog performed at the second "Rock Against Racism" concert at the Northcote Town Hall in Northcote, Melbourne, along with bands including Men at Work and Aboriginal South Australian band No Fixed Address, along with feminist circus troupe Wimmin's Circus.

=== Ross Hannaford's Lucky Dog – Lucky Dog ===
Tracklist: 1. Mr Gibby – Mike Krelle, Ross Hannaford, 2. Let Love Come- Margot Barrett, 3. Spirit Of The Land- Martin Kellock, 4. Camel Train Mike Krelle, 5. Every Day- Martin Kellock, Ross Hannaford, Mike Krelle.

- Remastered At – Audrey Studios

==== Credits ====
- Artwork – Jenny Huntley
- Bass Guitar – Wayne Duncan (2)
- Didgeridoo, Percussion – Kofi
- Drums, Percussion – Geoff Hassall
- Guitar, Vocals – Ross Hannaford
- Keyboards – Mike Krelle
- Rhythm Guitar, Vocals – Martin Kellock
- Percussion, Vocals – Margot Barrett
- Producer – James "Jimbo" Barton
- Remastered By – Craig Pilkington

Originally released on cassette tape in 1980; 2015 Limited Edition reissue copyright 2015 Ross Hannaford

== Relax with Max ==
Ross Hannaford along with other great musicians such as Gary Young, Greg Ham, Toots "Linda", James Black and David Adam, played with Max Vella in "Relax with Max" in the late 1980s.

== The Ross Hannaford Trio ==
In 1996 Ross teamed up with drummer and producer Nicky Bomba to record the critically acclaimed album reflecting the live setlist of the trio. Howard Cairns joined them on double bass capturing the raw brilliance of Ross. Mushroom Records released the album citing it an evergreen classic. The trio teamed up with director Clayton Jacobson (Kenny, Brother's Nest) to shoot a filmclip for the dirgy 'Monkey on my Back'. Ross had composed the song with underground Melbourne poet Paul Madigan. in September 2020, Transmitter Records re-released the album on vinyl with a showbag that included a teatowel, LP, signature helicopter hat and Transmitter Records tote bag. The trio toured the album extensively with double bass duties also covered by Stu Speed and Barry Deenick.

== Busking ==
Hannaford was regularly seen in Melbourne, busking. His performance and guitar playing opening up his music to a whole new audience.

== Reunions ==
Daddy Cool reformed in 1974 and continued until 1976, when they split again. Hannaford and Wilson's last collaboration in this period was on the soundtrack for the 1976 movie Oz.

Hannaford subsequently did a considerable amount of session work and played in many bands. His group and recording credits include The Black Sorrows, Paul Madigan & The Humans, Ian Moss, Steve Hoy, Mark Gillespie, Billy T, Ram Band, Goanna and Relax with Max. In the 1990s he and his band Dianna Kiss had a long-standing residency at the Esplanade Hotel in St Kilda, Melbourne.

In 2005 the original members of Daddy Cool reunited for a one-off performance at a Melbourne benefit concert in aid of the Asian tsunami disaster, and this led to the 2006 reformation of the group and the recording of a new single and album. In November 2007, the original Daddy Cool line-up reformed for a national tour of Australia with the Beach Boys & Christopher Cross. The tour took in Melbourne, Hunter Valley, Adelaide, Perth, Wollongong & Sydney. In later years Hannaford was a familiar figure on the streets of Melbourne, regularly busking in Melbourne's CBD and at Camberwell Market.

== Solo career ==
In mid-2015 he released a new 10 track CD 'Hanna', which features all original compositions and 'all sounds' by Hannaford ′except Mau the cat (Track 7)' and Mark Ferrie on bass (Track 5).

== Health and death ==
In July 2015, it was announced that Hannaford was suffering from "serious health issues", and that he had to cancel a planned national tour because he was too ill to work. Friends and colleagues, including singer-songwriter Steve Hoy and songwriter Margot Barrett (a friend and collaborator since their art school days in the late 1960s) organised a benefit concert which was staged in Melbourne to raise money for Hannaford's ongoing health care. The line-up included former Daddy Cool bandmates, Ross Wilson, Wayne Duncan and Gary Young, Steve Hoy, the RocKwiz Orchestra, The Black Sorrows, and Mike Rudd, with TV personality Brian Nankervis (RocKwiz) as MC. The first concert sold out within 24 hours and a second show was quickly organised, which also sold out.

As part of a project in which people tell their life stories, filmmaker Haydn Keenan shot a long interview with Hannaford in late 2014. The interview was edited into a 60-minute DVD, with all proceeds going to the guitarist. Hannaford died on 8 March 2016, aged 65, from cancer; he had been diagnosed with the condition a year earlier.

== Discography ==
- The Ross Hannaford Trio (as The Ross Hannaford Trio) (1996)
- Hey Gringo (as The Ross Hannaford Trio)
- I Was There (as The Ross Hannaford Trio) (2000)
- Hanna (2015)

=== See also ===
- The Pink Finks
- Daddy Cool (band)

== Awards and nominations ==
=== Go-Set Pop Poll ===
The Go-Set Pop Poll was coordinated by teen-oriented pop music newspaper, Go-Set and was established in February 1966 and conducted an annual poll during 1966 to 1972 of its readers to determine the most popular personalities.

Year	Nominee / work	Award	Result
1971	himself	Best Guitarist	4th
