= The Rays =

American musical group

The Rays were an American group formed in New York City in 1955, and active into the early 1960s. They first recorded for Chess Records. Their biggest hit single was "Silhouettes", a moderately-slow doo-wop piece of pop music that reached number 3 on the Billboard Hot 100 in 1957 on Cameo after being initially released on the small XYZ Records. It sold over one million copies, and was awarded a gold disc. It reached number 1 in Canada. The song was written by Bob Crewe and Frank Slay, Jr. Also on XYZ, they had a minor hit with "Mediterranean Moon" a mid-chart hit with "Magic Moon" (by this time, XYZ was being nationally distributed by London Records).

They also recorded the original version of "Daddy Cool", which was used as part of a medley with Little Richard's "The Girl Can't Help It", for the UK band Darts which made number 6 in the UK Singles Chart in 1977. The song also lent its name to the Australian band Daddy Cool, who recorded the song in 1971.

"Silhouettes" was also released by the Diamonds in 1957 reaching number 10 on the charts and later in a slightly faster cover version by Herman's Hermits in 1965, reaching number 5 on the US chart and number 1 in Canada.. It was also covered by Bob Dylan, but still unreleased, from his Basement Tapes sessions in the late 1960s.

== Group members ==
- Harold Miller – (lead singer) – (born Brooklyn, New York City)(Died In October, 2021)
- Walter Ford – (tenor) – (born Lexington, Kentucky)
- David Jones – (tenor) – (born Brooklyn, New York)(Died 1995)
- Harry James – (baritone) – (born Brooklyn, New York)

== Billboard singles ==
- 1957 "Silhouettes" US Black Singles number 3
- 1957 "Silhouettes" U.S. Pop Singles number 3 / Canada number 1
- 1960 "Mediterranean Moon" U.S. Billboard Hot 100 number 95
- 1961 "Magic Moon (Clair de lune)" U.S. Billboard Hot 100 number 49
