= ARIA Hall of Fame =

Australian music award

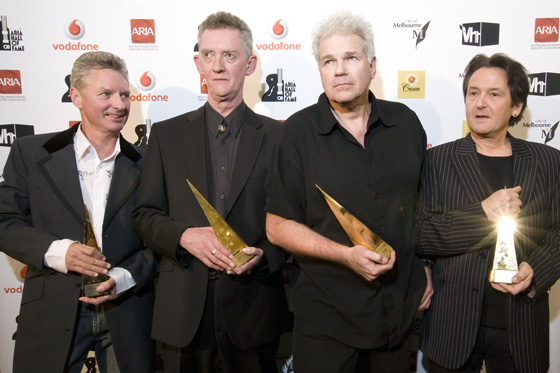
- Dragon at the 2008 ARIA Hall of Fame, 1 July, Melbourne Town Hall
- Awarded for: To honour the growing number of legendary performers, producers, songwriters and others who have influenced music culture in Australia.
- Country: Australia
- Presented by: Australian Recording Industry Association
- First award: 1988
- Website: aria.com.au/pages/hall-of-fame.htm

Television/radio coverage
- Network: Network Nine

Since 1988 the Australian Recording Industry Association (ARIA) has inducted artists into its annual ARIA Hall of Fame. While most have been recognised at the annual ARIA Music Awards, in 2005 ARIA sought to create a separate standalone ceremony ARIA Icons: Hall of Fame event as only one or two acts could be inducted under the old format due to time restrictions. Since 2005 VH1 obtained the rights to broadcast the show live on Foxtel, Austar and Optus networks; and each year five or six acts were inducted into the Hall of Fame with an additional act inducted at the following ARIA Music Awards.

At 1 July 2008 Hall of Fame ceremony, held at the Melbourne Town Hall, ARIA stated that the Hall of Fame ceremony would be completely separate from the ARIA Music Awards – there would be no additional inductees at the latter ceremony. ARIA had opened the Hall of Fame ceremony to the general public for the first time, and ARIA president Ed St John announced that a new annual exhibition, at the Arts Centre Melbourne from November, would showcase memorabilia honouring the Hall of Fame inductees. In 2011, the ceremony returned to the general ARIA Music Awards with two new inductees. In late 2017 ARIA partnered with Arts Centre Melbourne and the Australian music industry to establish the Australian Music Vault at Arts Centre Melbourne, which includes an honour board for all the inductees since 1988. In 2024, it was announced that a special separate event will be held in 2026 to induct a "large number of people into the Hall of Fame at once".

As of 12 June 2026 there are 90 inductees, including Rolf Harris, which was revoked.

== List of inductees ==
Year	Inductee	Ref.
1988	Joan Sutherland	
1988	Johnny O'Keefe	
1988	Slim Dusty	
1988	Col Joye	
1988	Vanda & Young	
1988	AC/DC	
1989	Nellie Melba	
1989	Ross Wilson	
1990	Percy Grainger	
1990	Sherbet	
1991	Billy Thorpe	
1991	Glenn Shorrock	
1991	Don Burrows	
1991	Peter Dawson	
1992	Skyhooks	
1993	Cold Chisel	
1993	Peter Allen	
1994	Men at Work	
1995	The Seekers	
1996	Australian Crawl	
1996	Horrie Dargie	
1997	Bee Gees	
1997	Paul Kelly	
1997	Graeme Bell	
1998	The Masters Apprentices	
1998	The Angels	
1999	Richard Clapton	
1999	Jimmy Little	
2000	No inductees	
2001	INXS	
2001	The Saints	
2002	Olivia Newton-John	
2003	John Farnham	
2004	Little River Band	
2005	Jimmy Barnes	
2005	Smoky Dawson	
2005	Renée Geyer	
2005	Normie Rowe	
2005	Split Enz	
2005	The Easybeats	
2005	Hunters & Collectors	
2006	Daddy Cool	
2006	Divinyls	
2006	Icehouse	
2006	Helen Reddy	
2006	Rose Tattoo	
2006	Lobby Loyde	
2006	Midnight Oil	
2007	Frank Ifield	
2007	Hoodoo Gurus	
2007	Marcia Hines	
2007	Jo Jo Zep & The Falcons	
2007	Brian Cadd	
2007	Radio Birdman	
2007	Nick Cave	
2008	Dragon	
2008	Russell Morris	
2008	Max Merritt	
2008	The Triffids	
2008	~~Rolf Harris~~ (Note: On 1 July 2014, ARIA announced that Rolf Harris' Hall of Fame award was withdrawn after he was convicted on 12 counts of indecent assault.)	
2009	Kev Carmody	
2009	The Dingoes	
2009	Little Pattie	
2009	Mental As Anything	
2009	John Paul Young	
2010	The Church	
2010	Models	
2010	Johnny Young	
2010	John Williamson	
2010	The Loved Ones	
2011	Kylie Minogue	
2011	The Wiggles	
2012	Yothu Yindi	
2013	Air Supply	
2014	Molly Meldrum	
2014	Countdown	
2015	Tina Arena	
2016	Crowded House	
2017	Daryl Braithwaite	
2018	Kasey Chambers	
2019	Human Nature	
2020	Archie Roach	
2021	No inductees (Note: Due to COVID-safe restrictions there were no inductions in 2021.)	
2022	No inductees (Note: Due to the ceremony staging three tribute performances to honour inductees who had died in the year, there were no new inductions in 2022.)	
2023	Jet	
2024	Missy Higgins	
2025	You Am I	
2026	Gurrumul	
2026	Jenny Morris	
2026	Kate Ceberano	
2026	Spiderbait	
2026	The Living End	
2026	Vika and Linda	

=== Repeat inductees ===
Twelve artists have been inducted into the ARIA Hall of Fame under more than one role:

- Glenn Shorrock as a solo artist in 1991, as a member of Little River Band in 2004.
- Harry Vanda and George Young of Vanda & Young as songwriters and producers in 1988, as members of The Easybeats in 2005.
- Jimmy Barnes as a member of Cold Chisel in 1993, as a solo artist in 2005.
- Ross Wilson as a solo artist and producer in 1989, as a member of Daddy Cool in 2006.
- Richard Grossman as a member of Divinyls in 2006, as a member of Hoodoo Gurus in 2007.
- Gary Young as a member of Daddy Cool in 2006, as a member of Jo Jo Zep & The Falcons in 2007.
- Neil Finn, Tim Finn and Paul Hester as members of both Split Enz in 2005 and Crowded House in 2016.
- Daryl Braithwaite as a member of Sherbet in 1990, as a solo artist in 2017.
- Gurrumul as a member of Yothu Yindi in 2012, as a solo artist in 2026.

== See also ==
- ARIA
- ARIA Music Awards
- VH1 Australia
- List of music museums
- Hall of Fame inductees (alphabetical category)
