= Marvin & Johnny =

American doo-wop duo

Marvin & Johnny were an American doo-wop duo that recorded in the 1950s. The duo comprised Marvin Phillips (born October 23, 1931) and Emory "Johnny" Perry (March 1, 1928 – January 6, 2011), who recorded the early doo-wop single, "Cherry Pie".

== Career ==
Phillips was born in Guthrie, Oklahoma, United States and Perry in Sherman, Texas, but their impact in the music industry occurred in Los Angeles in 1954. The pair had become acquainted in 1949 when they were saxophonists for The Richard Lewis Band.

Prior to teaming up with Perry, Phillips worked with several other artists who performed under the name "Johnny." The first was Carl Green, and later Johnny Starks. Phillips also paired with the R&B singer Jesse Belvin. They charted with "Dream Girl" b/w "Daddy Loves Baby" in late 1952. "Dream Girl" received good airplay and sales in California, but Belvin had opportunities elsewhere and left Phillips to pursue a solo career. Later, Marvin "Rip" Spencer, Phillips' nephew, would perform under the Marvin and Johnny names.

Phillips then teamed up with Carl "Johnny" Green, who had been working as a duo recording as Johnny & Mack for Deluxe Records. This incarnation of the duo recorded "Baby Doll" b/w "I'm Not Your Fool" for Specialty Records in the summer of 1953. At the same time, Phillips recorded the single "Sweetheart Darling" for Swingtime Records. The next outing for the duo was "Jo Jo" b/w "How Long She Been Gone" in early 1954. "School of Love" b/w "Boy Loves Girl" was their next release. On July 13, 1954, the pair signed with the Bihari brothers and moved to the Modern Records label. At Modern, they recorded "Tick Tock" and "Cherry Pie." The record was a big seller, and both sides received airplay. As was commonplace among early doo-wop, part of its popularity rested with the double-entendre lyric.

After "Cherry Pie", the pair performed on shows and revues that traveled around the West Coast of the United States. They released "Day In-Day Out" b/w "Flip", then "Kiss Me" b/w "Sugar," and "Little Honey" b/w "Honey Girl". None of these recordings had the commercial impact of "Cherry Pie."

Aside from their doo-wop lineage, Marvin & Johnny were significant figures in the transition from West Coast jump blues to R&B. In 1955, Marvin & Johnny continued to do personal appearances and recorded singles. However, their appeal continued to be based on "Cherry Pie." They went their separate ways that year, but Marvin did not let the Marvin & Johnny name die. Jesse Belvin had received his discharge from the U.S. Army by this time and he rejoined Phillips. In July 1956, Phillips and Belvin broke up again as Phillips began a solo career billed as Long Tall Marvin. Aladdin Records released "My Dear My Darling" in September 1956 and credited it to Marvin & Johnny. In May 1958, an old Marvin & Johnny recording of "Yak Yak" b/w "Pretty Eyes" was released on Aladdin.

George Carlin performed "Cherry Pie" following a monologue on the Gladys Knight & the Pips variety show in 1975, backed by the Pips, and again on The Arsenio Hall Show on 30 November 1989.
