= Wayne Duncan (musician) =

Australian musician (1944–2016)

- Born: Wayne Ian Duncan; 31 May 1944; Preston, Victoria, Australia
- Died: 4 December 2016 (aged 72) Melbourne, Victoria, Australia
- Genres: Rock and roll; progressive rock
- Occupation: Musician
- Instruments: Bass guitar; backing vocals
- Years active: 1959–2016
- Formerly of: The Rondells; Sons of the Vegetal Mother; Daddy Cool; Gary Young's Hot Dog; Jane Clifton and the Go Go Boys; the Black Sorrows; the Hornets

Wayne Ian Duncan (31 May 1944 – 4 December 2016) was an Australian rock musician. In 1970 he was a founding member of the doo-wop band, Daddy Cool, providing bass guitar and backing vocals. They were inducted into the ARIA Hall of Fame in 2006. During his career he had also been a member of the Rondells, Sons of the Vegetal Mother, Gary Young's Hot Dog, Jane Clifton and the Go Go Boys, the Black Sorrows, and the Hornets. In late November 2016 Duncan had a stroke and died a week later, he was survived by his domestic partner, Anne, and by two children. According to Australian music journalist, Ian McFarlane, "Duncan was never a sedate bassist. One only has to listen to some of the latter-day DC material... to hear how inventive his playing could be."

== Early years to the Rondells ==
Wayne Ian Duncan was born on 31 May 1944 and grew up in Preston, a Melbourne suburb, as one of six children. Duncan left Northcote High School, aged 15, to work as a copy boy for a newspaper. He learned to play bass guitar and, from 1959, periodically performed in instrumental groups including the Ramrods and then the Lincolns.

Duncan and Gary Young (drums, vocals) were the rhythm section of numerous Melbourne-based bands from 1963. They first worked together when Duncan joined Young in the Lincolns, replacing Ian Allen on bass guitar, alongside Gil Matthews on guitar, Ed Nantes on guitar and Roger Treble on lead guitar. Duncan had been taught bass guitar by Allen. The Lincolns added a singer, Bob Johnson, when beat music broke through in 1964.

The Lincolns changed their name to the Rondells whenever they backed Bobby & Laurie, a popular singing duo of Bobby Bright and Laurie Allen. The touring version of the Rondells in 1965 were Duncan, Treble and Young joined by John Sullivan on rhythm guitar who was later replaced by Barry Rodgers. Bobby & Laurie, backed by the Rondells, had a No. 1 hit, with their cover version of Roger Miller's "Hitch Hiker", in May 1966.

The Rondells also backed other artists: Bobby Knight, Lynne Randell, Buddy England, Billy Adams and Bobby Shore. In February 1967, following the split of Bobby & Laurie, Allen formed a soul music group, Dice, later renamed the Laurie Allen Revue. The line-up included Duncan and Young, with Barry Rogers, Phil Manning on guitar and backing singers, sisters Glenys and Colleen Hewett. The Revue released three singles on Festival Records – "Beautiful Brown Eyes" (August 1967), "Any Little Bit" (April 1968) and "As Long As I Got You" (June 1968).

== Sons of the Vegetal Mother to Daddy Cool ==
Duncan and Young formed a progressive rock group, Sons of the Vegetal Mother in late 1969 with Ross Hannaford on lead vocals and lead guitar, and Ross Wilson on lead vocals, harmonica and rhythm guitar. It had an experimental sound and a floating line-up of auxiliary members. They included: Mike Rudd (later in Spectrum) (bass guitar), Trevor Griffin (piano), Jeremy Kellock (Jeremy Noone) (tenor sax), Tim Partridge (bass guitar), Ian Wallace (alto sax), Simon Wettenhall (trumpet) and Bruce Woodcock (tenor sax).

As a side project of the Sons of the Vegetal Mother, Duncan, Hannaford, Wilson and Young formed Daddy Cool in 1970. In May 1971 Rosemary Fairbarn of The Canberra Times caught their performance and observed, "With a sound so together and free of mind-blasting, complicated pieces, its rhythm arousing the dancers and its non-association with rockie back-jazz... their harmony is the zinging powerful force behind their simple rock and roll beat."

According to Australian music journalist, Ian McFarlane, "Duncan and Young comprised the tightest rhythm section of the day, with Duncan's melodic, yet always 'in the pocket', bass lines as the solid pulse for the whole... Duncan was never a sedate bassist. One only has to listen to some of the latter-day DC material, such as 'Hi Honey Ho', 'Daddy Rocks Off', 'Teenage Blues', 'Teen Love/Drive-In Movie/Love in a F.J.' or 'Make Your Stash', to hear how inventive his playing could be." The group were inducted into the ARIA Hall of Fame in 2006.

During his career Duncan had also been a member of Gary Young's Hot Dog, Jane Clifton and the Go Go Boys, the Black Sorrows, and the Hornets. Daddy Cool, with Duncan, Hannaford, Wilson and Young, reformed in 2005, released a single in February of that year and play at a benefit concert for victims of the 2004 tsunami at the Myer Music Bowl, Melbourne. A new Daddy Cool recording, "The Christmas Bug", was released for charity. A new Daddy Cool album, The New Cool was released in 2007 on Liberation Records.

Duncan died in December 2016 and was survived by his partner, Anne, and two children. McFarlane observed, "It was reported that he had suffered a stroke last week from which he never recovered".

== Awards and nominations ==
=== Go-Set Pop Poll ===
The Go-Set Pop Poll was coordinated by teen-oriented pop music newspaper, Go-Set and was established in February 1966 and conducted an annual poll during 1966 to 1972 of its readers to determine the most popular personalities.

Year	Nominee / work	Award	Result
1971	himself	Best Bass Guitarist	3rd
