= Sparmac =

Australian record production company

Sparmac (Sparmac Productions) was an Australian independent record production company and recording label of the early 1970s, best known for its association with the successful Australian rock band Daddy Cool.

The company was established ca. 1969 by radio DJ (and former Kommotion host) Ken Sparkes, and John McDonald, who was then the owner of popular Melbourne record store The Disc Shop, in Bourke Street. The company name was taken from the combination of their surnames.

Rick Springfield released his debut solo single, "Speak to the Sky", on the label. The song was a major hit in Australia, reaching No 5 on the Go-Set national chart in January 1972 and it became his first hit in the US, reaching No 14 on the Billboard Hot 100.

As well as acting as the label's producer, Robie Porter released three solo singles on Sparmac: "Gemini" / "He Is Not Me" (August 1970), "Santa Claus" / "Funky Version" (December 1970) and a cover of the Joe Cocker-Chris Stainton song "Try to Find More Love (There Must be a Reason)" / "Empty" (March 1971). Other notable Sparmac singles include:

- "Golden Miles" / "The Gully" (1971) by noted progressive rock band Healing Force, rated by Australian rock historian Ian McFarlane as the greatest Australian progressive rock recording of the early 1970s.
- "Ongo Bongo Man" (1972) by local supergroup Gerry & The Joy Band, fronted by former Loved Ones singer Gerry Humphries, with an all-star backing group that included most of Daddy Cool.
- "Feelings" / "Young Man's Lament" (1971) the debut single by the short-lived soft rock duo Frieze, consisting of Darryl Cotton and Beeb Birtles, both of whom were former members of Zoot.
