= Teddy McRae =

American jazz tenor saxophonist and arranger (1908–1999)

Teddy McRae (January 22, 1908 – March 4, 1999) was an American jazz tenor saxophonist and arranger.

== Biography ==
McRae was born in Waycross, Georgia in January 22, 1908, and was brought up in Philadelphia, Pennsylvania. A performer with local ensembles when young, including one composed of family members, he performed with June Clark in 1926 before moving to New York City to found his own band.

He subsequently performed with Charlie Johnson, Elmer Snowden (1932), Stuff Smith (1934), Lil Armstrong (1935), and Chick Webb (1936-39), the last as both a soloist and arranger. After Webb's death, he became musical director for the orchestra during its tenure of Ella Fitzgerald's leadership (1939–41). He also recorded during the 1930s with Benny Morton, Teddy Wilson, and Red Allen.

During the 1940s, McRae worked with the orchestras of Cab Calloway (1941–42), Jimmie Lunceford (1942), Lionel Hampton (1943), and Louis Armstrong (1944-45), and served as Armstrong's musical director during his period with that band. He also wrote tunes for Artie Shaw and formed his own band in 1945.

He and Eddie Wilcox then established their own R&B label, Raecox, during the 1950s. It was short-lived, however, leading McRae to shift much of his work to arranging in subsequent decades, although he did record with Champion Jack Dupree in 1955 and 1956. He also recorded a few sides for Groove Records in 1955 and for Moonshine Records in 1958.

Some of his recordings billed him as "Teddy (Mr. Bear) McRae," or simply as "Mr. Bear."
