= Frank Slay =

American songwriter, A&R director, record producer and record label owner

Frank Conley Slay Jr. (July 8, 1930 – September 30, 2017) was an American songwriter, A&R director, record producer, and record label owner. He wrote with Bob Crewe in the late 1950s and early 1960s, the partnership's most successful songs, including "Silhouettes," a hit for several artists, including The Rays and Herman's Hermits, "Daddy Cool", and "Tallahassee Lassie". As a producer, his biggest hit was "Incense and Peppermints" by the Strawberry Alarm Clock.

== Career ==
He was born in Dallas, Texas, and moved to New York City in 1951, attempting to find work as a songwriter. In 1957, he and Crewe wrote "Silhouettes" and "Daddy Cool" for the Rays. Initially released on the XYZ label set up by Slay and Crewe, "Silhouettes" became a top ten pop hit in the US for both the Rays (#3) and the Diamonds (#10), and was re-recorded successfully by Herman's Hermits in 1965 (#5 US, #3 UK), and Cliff Richard in 1990 (#10 UK). The song "Daddy Cool" – originally on the B-side of the Rays' single – became a #6 hit in the UK in 1977 for Darts. Slay and Crewe also wrote hits for Billy & Lillie, including "La Dee Dah" (covered in the UK by Jackie Dennis), and Freddy Cannon, for whom "Tallahassee Lassie" became a top ten hit in 1959.

In 1961, Slay moved to Philadelphia to become A&R Director for Swan Records, Cannon's record label. As well as producing many of Freddy Cannon's records, he also had a minor hit under his name in late 1961, "Flying Circle", an instrumental adaptation of the traditional song "Hava Nagila", which reached #45 on the Billboard pop chart credited to Frank Slay and his Orchestra. Slay moved back to New York around 1963, and then to Los Angeles. He worked as an independent producer, and in 1967 produced "Incense and Peppermints", a US #1 hit for Strawberry Alarm Clock. He also set up Claridge Records in 1965. In 1974, the label had a US hit with "Don't Call Us, We'll Call You" by Sugarloaf, a record described by Slay as "probably... the last top ten record on Billboard by a truly independent record company..."

Slay remained active in the music industry and last lived in San Diego, California.
