= Gary Young (Australian musician) =

American-born Australian musician (born 1947)

- Born: Gary Young; 1947 (age 78–79); New York City, New York, U.S.
- Genres: Rock and roll, progressive rock
- Occupations: Musician; singer; songwriter; radio personality
- Instruments: drums, vocals, guitar
- Years active: 1950s–present
- Labels: Sparmac; Wizard; Sony/BMG; Liberation
- Formerly of: The Rondells; Sons of the Vegetal Mother; Daddy Cool; Gary Young's Hot Dog; Jo Jo Zep & The Falcons; The Rockin' Emus; Rock Doctors; Cold Chisel; The Black Sorrows; Little Red Rooster; Relax With Max; The Prestones; Crackajacks; The Cool Healers; Southern Lightning> The Hornets

Gary Young (born 1947) is an American-born Australian musician who was a founding member of Australian rock band Daddy Cool in which he played the drums and sang backing vocals. He also played drums with Jo Jo Zep & The Falcons amongst other bands. Young was twice inducted into the Aria Hall of Fame as a member of both Daddy Cool and Jo Jo Zep & The Falcons which were inducted into the Australian Recording Industry Association (ARIA) Hall of Fame in 2006 and 2007 respectively.

== Biography ==
=== Rondells ===
Gary Young (drums, vocals) and Wayne Duncan (bass guitar, vocals) were the rhythm section of many bands, particularly instrumental groups, from the early 1960s onwards. One of these was The Rondells who were also the backing band for Bobby & Laurie, a popular singing duo with their No. 1 hit "Hitch Hiker" from 1966. Young joined the Rondells in 1964, at the age of 17, whilst still at Carey Baptist Grammar School.

The Rondells had developed from a 1962 school band, The Silhouettes, which were a Shadows-style instrumental band with Ian B. Allen (bass), future Aztec Gil Matthews (guitar), Ed Nantes (guitar), Roger Treble (lead guitar) and Young (drums). This group changed its name to The Lincolns in 1963, by which time Matthews had left and they were managed by Ron Blackmore. Bassist Duncan (ex-Ramrods), who had learnt bass from Allen, replaced Allen who left to join the Planets. The Lincolns added singer Bob Johnson when beat music broke through in 1964. Young later took over on vocals from Johnson, but tired of having to sing and play drums, he quit in early 1965 to form the vocal duo Double Trouble with Issy Dye and was replaced in The Lincolns by drummer Barry Gough. Double Trouble split soon after and Young rejoined Duncan, Treble and rhythm guitarist John Sullivan (who was later replaced by Barry Rogers) in a new touring version of The Lincolns, which was billed as The Rondells whenever they backed another Blackmore act, Bobby & Laurie. They also backed other Blackmore artists such as Bobby Knight, Lynne Randell, Buddy England, Billy Adams and Bobby Shore. Young also played in The Changing Times and Ram Jam Big Band. In February 1967, following the split of Bobby & Laurie, Laurie Allen put together a soul revue, originally called Dice, later renamed The Laurie Allen Revue. The lineup included The Rondells' Young, Barry Rogers and Duncan, guitarist Phil Manning and as backing singers, sisters Glenys and Colleen Hewett. The Revue released three singles on Festival Records – "Beautiful Brown Eyes" (August 1967), "Any Little Bit" (April 1968) and "As Long As I Got You" (June 1968).

=== Sons of the Vegetal Mother ===
Young and Ross Wilson met in 1969 whilst both were working in a book warehouse, each had previous bandmates who were interested in forming a new group. Wilson, Ross Hannaford, Young and Duncan formed Sons of the Vegetal Mother later that year, this band had a more experimental Progressive rock sound. Other members included: Mike Rudd (later in Spectrum) (bass), Trevor Griffin (piano), Jeremy Kellock (Jeremy Noone) (tenor sax), Tim Partridge (bass), Ian Wallace (alto sax), Simon Wettenhall (trumpet) and Bruce Woodcock (tenor sax).

=== Daddy Cool ===
As a side project from Sons of the Vegetal Mother, four of its members (Duncan, Hannaford, Wilson and Young) formed Daddy Cool in 1970.

=== Radio show host ===
Young hosted the Chicken Mary radio show on 3RRR for 23 years, concluding in 2011. Daddy Cool featuring the original line-up reformed in 2005, released a single in February 2005 to play at a 27 February 2005 benefit concert for victims of the 2004 tsunami at the Myer Music Bowl in Melbourne. A new Daddy Cool recording, "The Christmas Bug", was released for charity. A new Daddy Cool album, The New Cool was released in 2007 on Liberation Records.

Jo Jo Zep & The Falcons were inducted into the 2007 ARIA Hall of Fame, this was the second time for Young who had already been inducted as a member of Daddy Cool in 2006.

== Singles discography ==
- "Rock 'n' Roll Lady" (1972) #30 AUS
- "One Night" (1973)
- "Saga of the Three Pigs" (1973)
- "Rockabilly Beatin' Boogie Band" (1973)
- "Ubangi Stomp"/"Mystery Train" (1980)
- "Running Late for Wandong" (1981)
- "Keep your Hands off my Baby" (1982)

== Albums discography ==
- Gary Young and the Rocking Emus (as Gary Young and the Rocking Emus) (1982)

== Awards and nominations ==
=== Go-Set Pop Poll ===
The Go-Set Pop Poll was coordinated by teen-oriented pop music newspaper, Go-Set and was established in February 1966 and conducted an annual poll during 1966 to 1972 of its readers to determine the most popular personalities.

Year	Nominee / work	Award	Result
1971	Gary Young (Daddy Cool)	Best Drummer	3rd

=== King of Pop Awards ===
The King of Pop Awards were voted by the readers of TV Week. The King of Pop award started in 1967 and ran through to 1978.

Year	Nominee / work	Award	Result
1971	Gary Young (Daddy Cool)	Best Drummer	Won
