= Broderick Smith =

Australian singer (1948–2023)

- Born: 17 February 1948; Hertfordshire, England
- Origin: Melbourne, Australia
- Died: 30 April 2023 (aged 75)
- Genres: Rock; blues; country rock
- Occupation: Musician
- Instruments: Harmonica; vocals; guitar; banjo
- Years active: 1962–2023
- Labels: Harvest; EMI; Festival/Mushroom; A&M
- Formerly of: Adderley Smith Blues Band; Carson; the Dingoes; Broderick Smith's Big Combo
- Website: brodericksmith.com

Broderick Smith (17 February 1948 – 30 April 2023) was an English-born Australian multi-instrumentalist, singer-songwriter and actor. He was a member of 1970s bands Sundown, Carson, and The Dingoes. In the 1980s, he was part of Broderick Smith's Big Combo where he recorded and performed both solos and duos. He acted on stage in the 1973 Australian version of the rock opera, Tommy, and in minor roles in the 1990s TV series Blue Heelers, Snowy River: The McGregor Saga, and State Coroner. Smith was involved with the writing of some 200 songs and ran workshops on song writing, harmonica, and vocals. He is the father of Ambrose Kenny-Smith, who has provided vocals, harmonica and keyboards for the rock band King Gizzard & the Lizard Wizard since 2011.

== Early life and education ==
Broderick Smith was born in Hertfordshire, England and, with his father Richard, mother Millicent (née Stone) and a younger sibling, migrated to Australia in April 1959 via RMS Orion out of the Port of Tilbury. They settled under the Assisted Passage Migration Scheme, initially, in St Albans a western suburb of Melbourne. He later recalled, "I remember going to [a] sideshow in St Albans as a kid and seeing a dancing chicken. But I didn't know they were on hot plates at the time. I thought wow – dancing chickens, why are their feet smoking?" He left secondary school in 1963 and worked as a messenger boy. From 1965, he was a sales clerk for Allans retail music store for three years. In the mid-1960s, he moved to Craigieburn and later the Central Victorian town of Castlemaine.

== Starting music career ==
According to Australian musicologist, Ian McFarlane, "blessed with a masterful blues voice, Smith has retained an interest in roots music right throughout his career." Smith's early influences were, "Muddy Waters, John Lee Hooker and Charlie Musselwhite." In 1962 or 1963 Smith was a member of the Maltese Band on percussion. Other blues groups he joined included the Smokey Hollows in 1965. He joined Adderley Smith Blues Band (1966–68) on vocals and harmonica, alongside Kerryn Tolhurst on guitar and mandolin. Smith had to leave the group when he was conscripted into the army as part of his National Service during the Vietnam War. From 1968 to 1970, he was stationed at Holsworthy Barracks in New South Wales. Upon his discharge, Smith briefly joined a country music group, Sundown, with Tolhurst, but left in 1971.

=== 1971–1973: Carson ===
Carson formed in January 1970 and was a blues-boogie band influenced by US group Canned Heat. During 1971, Smith replaced founder John Capek, providing vocals and harmonica. Other members included Greg Lawrie (guitar, slide guitar), Ian Ferguson (bass, vocals), Tony Lunt (drums) and Ian Winter (guitar). After they released a single "Travelling South" / "Moonshine" in August 1971, Ferguson left to be replaced successively by Barry Sullivan and Garry Clarke. Mal Logan (keyboards) joined later that year. Carson performed at the first Sunbury Rock Festival in January 1972. The following Easter, they played a legendary set at the Mulwala Pop Festival, alongside Canned Heat. Smith spent part of 1972 recording two solo singles: "Goin' on Down to the End of the World", released in May 1972, and "Yesterday it Rained", released in February 1973 on the Image label. He also kept up with Carson to record "Boogie, Part 1" / "Boogie, Part 2", which reached No. 30 on the National charts in September 1972. That was followed by their debut album, Blown, on Harvest Records, produced by Rod Coe, which reached No. 14 in December.

Australian psychedelic and progressive rock band Tamam Shud were recording tracks for Albie Falzon's 1972 surf film Morning of the Earth, including their song "First Things First". Their main lead singer, Lindsay Bjerre, was having voice problems so they recorded the song using lead guitarist Tim Gaze. Producer G. Wayne Thomas was unhappy with Gaze's vocals and asked Smith to fill in. According to Bjerre, Tamam Shud only found out about the switch at the film's premiere, but according to Smith, his contribution was made with Tamam Shud's knowledge and permission.

Carson performed at the 1973 Sunbury Rock Festival, on the Australia Day long weekend. Band members Winter and Ferguson left soon after and, by February, Carson had disbanded. A live recording of their Sunbury set, On the Air was released in April 1973.

=== 1973–1978: Tommy to the Dingoes ===
The Who's rock opera Tommy was performed in Australia in 1973, in an orchestral version, with Smith in the role of The Father (Mr Walker). Other Australian artists involved were Daryl Braithwaite (as Tommy), Billy Thorpe, Doug Parkinson, Wendy Saddington, Jim Keays, Colleen Hewett, Linda George, Ross Wilson, Bobby Bright, and Ian Meldrum (as "Uncle Ernie" in Sydney).

The Dingoes were formed in Melbourne in April 1973 by Smith's old band mate, Kerryn Tolhurst. The original line-up included Tolhurst (ex-Adderley Smith Blues Band, Sundown, Country Radio) (singer, songwriter, guitars), Chris Stockley (ex-CamPact, Axiom) (guitars), John Strangio (bass), John Lee (ex-Blackfeather (drums)) and Smith (vocals, harmonica). The band was formed to fuse rhythm and blues with Australian bush music but it was generally described as country rock. Their best performed singles were "Way Out West" and "Boy on the Run". Their 1974 debut self-titled album, The Dingoes, peaked at No. 18. They performed at Sunbury Rock Festivals in 1974 and 1975, making Smith one of the few artists who performed at all four Sunbury festivals. From 1976, the Dingoes relocated to US for their next two albums, Five Times the Sun in 1977 and Orphans of the Storm in 1979. While recording the latter album their management team, headed by Peter Rudge, had been devastated when some members of fellow-signing Lynyrd Skynyrd were killed in a plane crash in October 1977. The Dingoes finally split in February 1979. Smith had already returned to Australia in late 1978.

=== 1979–1988: Big Combo and others ===
After his 1978 return to Australia, Smith fronted various bands with his name featured: Broderick Smith's Hired Hands (1978–1979), Broderick Smith's Big Combo (1979–1982), Broderick Smith Band (1982–1985), and Broderick Smith and the Noveltones (1988). Of those, Big Combo provided his best known latter releases, with the singles "Faded Roses" and "My Father's Hands", and the 1981 album Broderick Smith's Big Combo. The line-up of his backing group included, John Ballard on guitar, saxophone and backing vocals, Peter Lee on drums, Mick "the Reverend" O'Connor on keyboards, and Ron Robertson on bass guitar. By October 1982, those four were all members of Tinsley Waterhouse Band.

=== 1990–2023: Acting, workshops and duos ===
Smith appeared in brief television roles including episodes of police drama Blue Heelers in 1994's "Adverse Possession" and 1997's "Bloodstained Angels"; 1998's historical drama Snowy River: The McGregor Saga episode "Prince of Hearts" and crime drama State Coroner episode "On Thin Ice".

Smith delivered numerous workshops on song writing, harmonica and vocals to schools within Victoria, writing about 200 songs, and has run workshops on song writing, harmonica and vocals. He considered himself to be primarily a lyricist. His song writing technique typically involves writing the lyrics in prose form, with the music then being written (usually by someone else), with the lyrics then changed to suit the music. Smith believed "lyrics should say something and not just be something to sing along to." Smith performed as a duo with Mick Ahearn (keyboards) in the late 1990s and produced other recording artists at Harcourt Valley Recorders. He also performed with Mick O'Connor on piano in the early 2000s, sometimes they added Pip Avent on tuba and Tim O'Connor on drums, with this line-up Smith recorded Too Easy in 2002. He played harmonica with the Backsliders, alternating with Ian Collard (of Collard Greens & Gravy) as a replacement for founding member Jim Conway, performed live on RocKwiz Episode 74 in January 2009 singing "God May Not Be With Us" and a Duet of the MGMT song "Time to Pretend" with Patience Hodgson from the Grates, performed with Tabasco Tom and Doc White, an American blues vocalist, singer songwriter and a Victorian blues and country musician. Participating in several tours around Australia and one in New Zealand in the late 2000s. He also performed on their album, Tabasco Tom & Doc White.

In the 2010s, Smith appeared on two King Gizzard & the Lizard Wizard albums, the band featuring his son Ambrose on harmonica. He narrated the voiceover for the track "Sam Cherry's Last Shot" on the band's first LP 12 Bar Bruise in 2012, and he wrote and narrated the text for the album Eyes Like the Sky released in 2013.

== Death ==
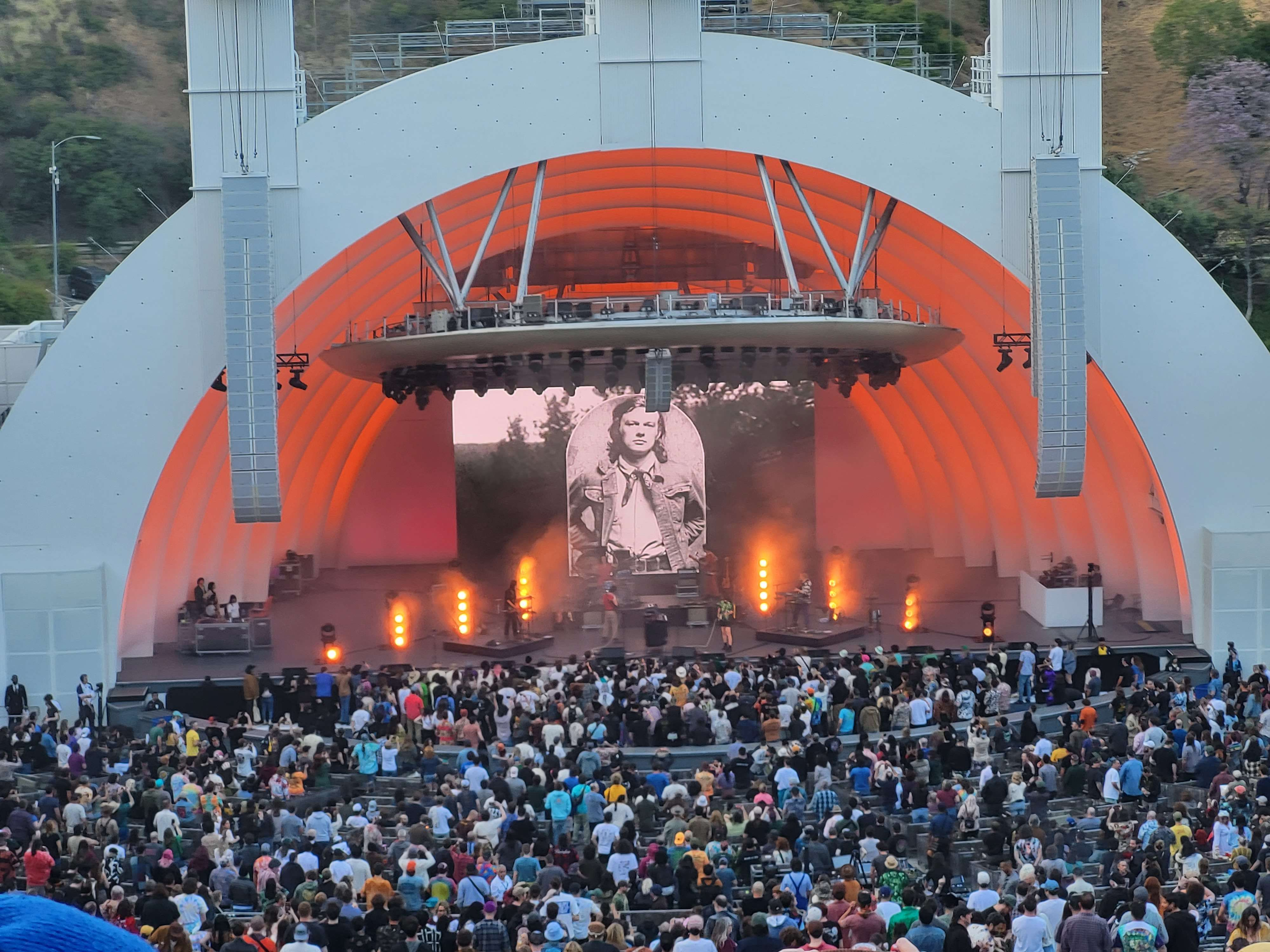
King Gizzard & the Lizard Wizard paying tribute to Broderick Smith at their June 21, 2023, show.

Smith died on 30 April 2023, at the age of 75 in his hometown of Castlemaine. Prior to his death, he had been scheduled to join King Gizzard & the Lizard Wizard on stage at Hollywood Bowl for their final residency show on June 21, 2023, where he would have performed some of his parts from Eyes Like the Sky. However, due to his passing, the band instead used the show to pay tribute, performing four tracks from the album with Broderick's narration played through the PA while a slideshow in the background showed various pictures from his life.

== Discography ==
=== Studio albums ===
List of studio albums, with selected details and chart positions
Title	Album details	Peak chart positions
Title	Album details	AUS
Broderick Smith's Big Combo (Broderick Smith's Big Combo)	Released: November 1981; Format: LP, Cassette; Label: WBE (WBEX 1006)	23
Broderick Smith	Released: 1984; Format: LP, Cassette; Label: Wheatley (WRLP 1001)	—
Suitcase	Released: 1992; Format: CD, Cassette; Label: Mushroom (D 30825)	—
My Shiralee	Released: 1994; Format: CD; Label: Newmarket Music (NEW1049.2)	—
Songster	Released: 1995; Format: CD; Label: ABC Music (4798332)	—
Crayon Angels	Released: 1996; Format: CD; Label: ABC Music (4835692)	—
Too Easy	Released: 2002; Format: CD; Label: ABC Music (4835692)	—
Unknown Country	Released: 2009; Format: CD; Label: Liberation Music (LMCD0045)	—
Man Out of Time	Released: 2018; Format: CD, LP, Digital; Label: Bloodlines (BLOOD18)	—

=== Compilation albums ===
List of compilation albums, with selected details
Title	Album details
Journal – The Best of Broderick Smith	Released: 2004; Format: CD; Label: Redbird Records (rb1006)

=== Other albums ===
List of other albums, with selected details and chart positions
Title	Album details	Peak chart positions
Title	Album details	AUS
12 Bar Bruise (by King Gizzard & the Lizard Wizard)	Released: 7 September 2012; Label Flightless; Narrated the track "Sam Cherry's Last Shot"	14
Eyes Like the Sky (by King Gizzard & the Lizard Wizard)	Released: 22 February 2013; Label: Flightless; Story and narration by Broderick Smith	10

=== Singles ===
List of singles, with selected chart positions
Title	Year	Peak chart positions	Album
Title	Year	AUS	Album
Credited as Broderick Smith
"Goin' On Down to the End of the World"	1972	51	Non-album single
Credited as Broderick Smith's Big Combo
"Faded Roses"	1981	31	Broderick Smith's Big Combo
"My Father's Hands"	1981	56	Broderick Smith's Big Combo
"High Rise"	1982	—	Broderick Smith's Big Combo
"Ruby in the Snow"	1982	99	Broderick Smith's Big Combo
Credited as Broderick Smith
"Vision of You"	1983	—	Broderick Smith
"When I Swim"	1984	—	Broderick Smith
"Here Comes Trouble"	1984	—	Broderick Smith
"Leah"	1985	—	Broderick Smith
"Snowblind Moon"	1992	—	Suitcase
"Battler's Ballad" (with The Bushwackers)	1996	—	Non-album single
"I Still Miss Someone"	1997	—	Crayon Angels

== See also ==
- Carson (band)
- The Dingoes
- Backsliders (band)
