= Black Alice =

Black Alice may refer to:

- Black Alice (comics), a DC Comics character
- Black Alice (novel), a novel by Thomas M. Disch and John Sladek under the pseudonym Thom Demijohn
- Black Alice, one of two musical alter-egos of the Japanese group Ali Project
- Black Alice (film), a 1975 Hong Kong film
- Black Alice, a character in the sci-fi cult film Sons of Steel portrayed by Perth-based singer Rob Hartley
- Black Alice (band), Australian band

== See also ==
- Black Aliss, a fictional witch in the backplot of Terry Pratchett's Discworld novels also known as Aliss Demurrage
