= Meadows Technicolour Fair =

Australian rock music festival

Meadows Technicolour Fair was an Australian rock music festival with fairground attractions, films and dramatic performances. It was held on a private farm near Meadows township, 32 km (20 mi) from Adelaide, over the Australia Day long weekend from 29 to 31 January 1972. International artists appearing were Mary Hopkin, Tom Paxton, and Edison Lighthouse; Australian artists included Blackfeather, Spectrum, Fraternity, Carson and Tamam Shud. The MCs were Jim Keays, Vince Lovegrove and Gerry Humphrys (ex-the Loved Ones).

== Background ==
As well as pop and rock music artists, Meadows Technicolour Fair, also featured fairground attractions, underground movies shown by the Adelaide film co-op, a performance of Freak Circus by the Street Theatre Group and talks on the environment. A rock church service was held on Sunday with music provided by Adelaide bands Buffalo Drive and Earth.

Held over the same long weekend as the 1972 Sunbury Pop Festival, the event attracted almost 30,000 people and featured many of the same Australian acts, as well three imported acts (singers Mary Hopkin, Tom Paxton and pop band Edison Lighthouse). It has been noted as "remarkable" that this festival attracted almost as many people as Sunbury, despite South Australia having less than 10% of the eastern states population. Billy Thorpe & The Aztecs, The Captain Matchbox Whoopee Band and English band Mungo Jerry were originally scheduled to perform but did not appear.

Although successful the festival failed to make a profit. The festival was evidently not filmed or recorded and has therefore remained virtually unknown- in fact, it is not even mentioned in any of the major print references on Australian rock music.

== Artists ==
The weekend was MCed by Jim Keays, Vince Lovegrove and Gerry Humphrys (former lead singer of the Loved Ones).

=== Saturday 29 January ===
- Toads Nitely
- Musick Express
- Rashamra
- Blackfeather
- Mary Hopkin
- Vytas Serelis (sitar player)
- Tom Paxton

=== Sunday 30 January ===
- Rock church Service with music by bands Buffalo Drive and Earth
- Goblins
- Gerry's Jugband (Gerry Humphrys, Phil Manning and others)
- Wild Cherries
- Phil Manning (with Warren Morgan and Barry Sullivan from Chain and Laurie Pryor)
- The La De Da's
- Spectrum
- Leo de Castro & Friends
- Fraternity
- Michael Turner In Session

=== Monday 31 January ===
- Blackfeather
- Michael Turner in Session
- Fraternity
- Manchild
- Goblins band
- Carson
- MacKenzie Theory
- Highway
- Superhuman
- Moonshine Jug & String Band
- Edison Lighthouse (replaced Mungo Jerry)
- Tamam Shud
