= Michael Gudinski =

Australian music industry executive (1952–2021)

Michael Gudinski AM
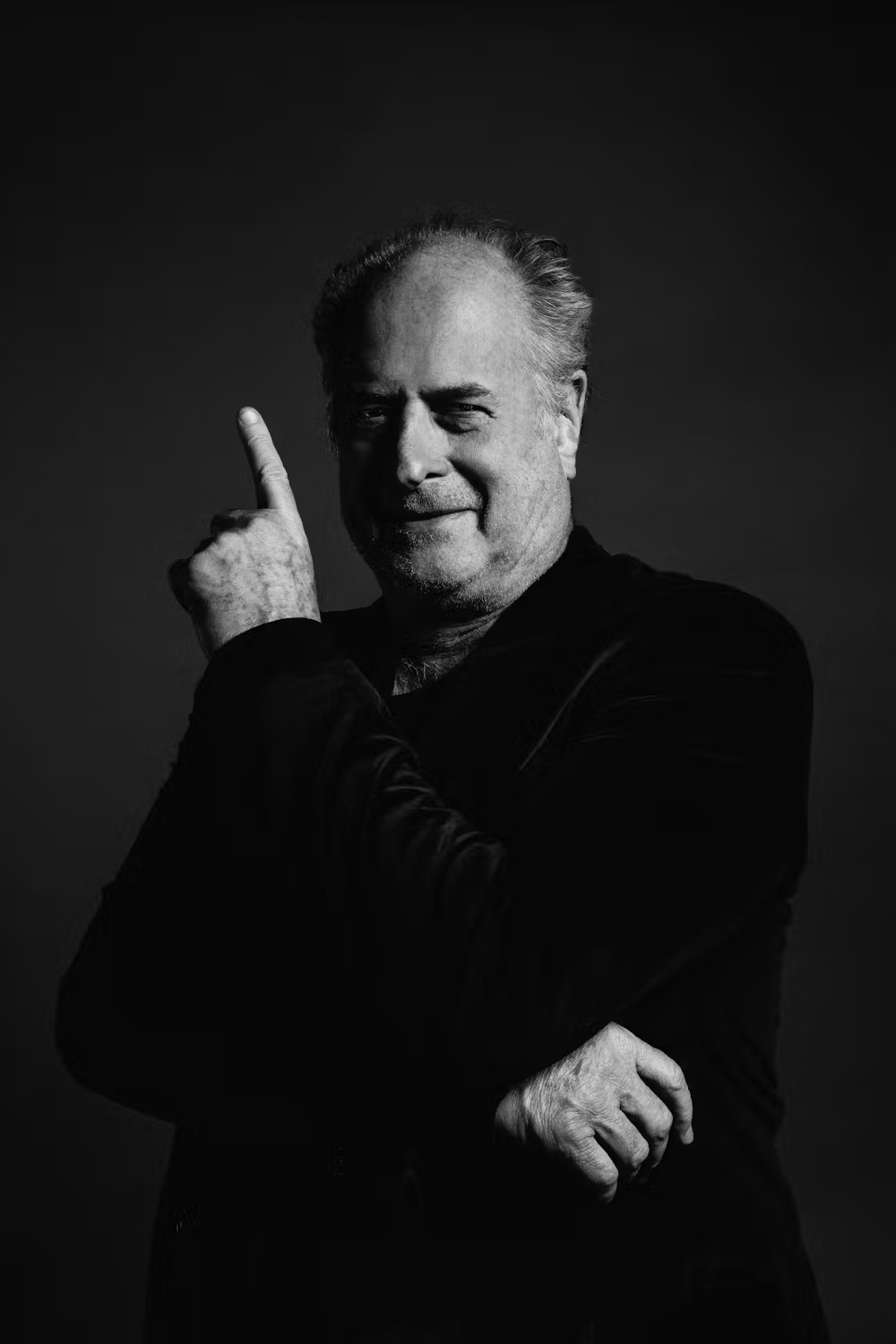
- Born: Michael Solomon Gudinski; 22 August 1952; Caulfield, Victoria, Australia
- Died: 2 March 2021 (aged 68); Melbourne, Victoria, Australia
- Occupations: A&R executive; concert promoter; film producer
- Years active: 1960s–2021
- Known for: Mushroom Group founder
- Spouse: Sue Gudinski
- Children: Kate Alexa, Matt Gudinski

Michael Solomon Gudinski (22 August 1952 – 2 March 2021) was an Australian record executive and promoter who was a leading figure in the Australian music industry. Born and raised in Melbourne, Gudinski formed the highly successful Australian record company Mushroom Records in 1972 through which he signed several generations of Australian musicians and performers ranging from MacKenzie Theory, Skyhooks, The Choirboys, Kylie Minogue, and New Zealand's Split Enz to newer artists such as Eskimo Joe, Evermore and others.

Gudinski was considered to be "one of the most significant and powerful players" in the Australian music landscape.

== Early life and education ==
Gudinski was born in Caulfield, a suburb of Melbourne, Victoria, to Jewish Russian immigrants Kuba and Nina Gudinski, who had arrived in Australia in 1948.

He was educated at Mount Scopus College and Melbourne High School.

== Career ==
In his teenage years, Gudinski began promoting dance hall events around Melbourne. In 1970, Gudinski established the Consolidated Rock artist agency with Michael Browning, managing artists including Chain and Healing Force. The pair later founded the short-lived music magazine Daily Planet.

Gudinski and fellow music agent Ray Evans formed Mushroom Records in late 1972. The company's first album was a triple-LP live recording of the 1973 Sunbury Festival. In its first few years Mushroom released albums and singles by some of the most significant Australian rock acts of the period, including Madder Lake, MacKenzie Theory, Matt Taylor, Ayers Rock, and the Dingoes.

Mushroom struggled to survive for its first two years, hampered by lack of airplay on commercial radio, and the company reportedly came close to folding on several occasions. But the label was dramatically pushed to the forefront of the Australian music scene in early 1975 with the massive success of Skyhooks, whose debut album Living in the 70's became the biggest-selling Australian LP ever released up to that time.

In 1977 Gudinski opened the music venue Bombay Bicycle Club in Bourke Street, Melbourne, soon moving it to Sydney Road Brunswick and renaming it Bombay Rock. This became one of the premier music venues of Australian and international rock bands in Melbourne.

Gudinski was convinced to sign expatriate New Zealand band Split Enz, who had recently relocated to Australia. Although they had only moderate success for the first few years, Split Enz scored huge success in 1980 with the release of their album True Colours and the hit single "I Got You", which marked the emergence of Neil Finn.

Through his ownership of Consolidated Rock, which later evolved into the Premier Artists/Harbour Agency group, Gudinski became the major player on the Australian east coast booking circuit, and enjoyed a virtual monopoly on rock music bookings in Melbourne for much of the 1970s. In partnership with others (including Frank Stivala, Philip Jacobsen and Ian James), he diversified his business interests to include most sections of the music industry including venues, concert promoting, merchandise, publishing and recording.

In 1988, Gudinski co-founded Melodian Records with Ian Meldrum.

In the early 1990s Gudinski sold 49% of Mushroom to News Ltd, who had owned Australia's largest record label, Festival Records since 1961. He sold his remaining 51% share to News in 1999 for a reported A$60 million, claiming that the sale was a protest against the changes to Australia's parallel record importation regulations.

In November 2005, shortly after the sale of Festival Mushroom's recording division to Warner Music Australia, Gudinski purchased Festival's publishing division for an undisclosed sum.

In 2020, Gudinski created The Sound, a music show for ABC TV which was developed out of an online production called The State of Music, which was created to help Australian musicians during the COVID-19 lockdown. He was also behind the Music from the Home Front concert, which was organised in nine days, so that artists could perform in the concert on ANZAC Day 2020.

== Public image ==
A "larger-than-life figure", Gudinski was often referred to as the "father of the Australian music industry". Gudinski was a highly visible public figure throughout his career and is considered to be the only Australian record company executive whose name was known by the general public.

In 2023 a documentary about his life and career was released, Ego: The Michael Gudinski Story. Aaron Glenane portrayed Gudinski in the 2016 television miniseries Molly.

== Personal life ==
Gudinski and his wife Sue had two children: daughter Kate, whom Gudinski signed to Liberation Music in mid-2004, and son Matt. Gudinski was also the godfather of Jimmy Barnes' daughter, Mahalia Barnes.

Gudinski was a life-long supporter of the St Kilda Football Club, and once served as their vice president.

== Death ==
On 2 March 2021, Gudinski died during his sleep at his home in Melbourne, at the age of 68. A private funeral held in Melbourne was attended by numerous celebrity performers including Kylie Minogue, Ed Sheeran, Dannii Minogue, Jimmy Barnes, Paul Kelly and Archie Roach. On 28 October 2021, a toxicology report revealed that he had died of mixed drug use, with 12 drugs including cocaine, oxycodone and morphine present in his body. The report additionally revealed that he had heart disease, cirrhosis, and had suffered recent vertebral compression fractures.

The opening caption of the Bruce Springsteen video for his song "I'll See You In My Dreams" reads: "In Memory of Michael Gudinski". The video was released on 3 March 2021, the day after Gudinski's death. Shortly after his death, Triple J's programme Hack (in addition to Double J's Zan Rowe) paid tribute to Gudinski, discussing his contributions to the Australian music industry. Australian Story also dedicated a segment towards him. Sheeran dedicated his song "Visiting Hours" to Gudinski as a tribute, and he performed it at his memorial service. On 4 March 2022, during American rock band Foo Fighters' final Australian concert before the death of their drummer, Taylor Hawkins, in Geelong, Victoria, the band dedicated their signature song "Everlong" to Gudinski.

On 24 March, a Gudinski memorial concert was held at Rod Laver Arena. It featured performances by artists including Kylie Minogue, Ed Sheeran, Jimmy Barnes and Paul Kelly, with appearances from artists around Australia and the world. It was live-streamed on Mushroom Group's YouTube channel and ABC Radio. Minogue and Sheeran performed together, fulfilling a wish by Gudinski.

== Awards and achievements ==
Gudinski received several awards for his work in the Australian entertainment industry. In 1992 he was awarded an ARIA Award for Special Achievement (as well as Mushroom Records), while in 2013 he was acknowledged as the inaugural ARIA Industry Icon.

At the 1998 APRA Music Awards he received the Ted Albert Award for Outstanding Services to Australian Music. Gudinski also received the JC Williamson Award in 2009, and at the 2013 Music Victoria Awards was inducted into the awards' Hall of Fame, forty years after he founded Mushroom Records.

In the 2006 Queen's Birthday Honours, Gudinski was made a Member of the Order of Australia for "service to the entertainment industry", the promotion of Australian music and service to the community.

Year	Award	Category	About	Result
1992	ARIA Music Awards	Special Achievement Award	Michael Gudinski & Mushroom Records	awarded
1998	APRA Awards (Australia)	Ted Albert Award for Outstanding Services to Australian Music	Michael Gudinski	awarded
1999	Australian Marketing Institute Awards	Sir Charles McGrath Award	Michael Gudinski	awarded
2003	International Live Music Conference (UK)	ILMC Bottle Award (Life achievement)	Michael Gudinski	awarded
2006	Queen's Birthday Honours	Member of the Order of Australia	Michael Gudinski	awarded
2006	Ernst & Young	Ernst & Young Southern Region Entrepreneur of the Year	Michael Gudinski	awarded
2009	JC Williamson Award	Lifetime Achievement Award	Michael Gudinski	awarded
2012	City of Melbourne	Melburnian of the Year	Michael Gudinski	awarded
2013	Music Victoria Awards	Music Victoria Hall of Fame	Michael Gudinski	inducted
2013	ARIA Music Awards	Icon Awards	Michael Gudinski	awarded
2014	Billboard	International Power Players	Michael Gudinski	awarded

== Bibliography ==
=== Books ===
- Coupe, Stuart (28 July 2015). Gudinski: The Godfather of Australian Music (1 ed.). Sydney: Hachette Australia. ISBN 9780733633102.
