= The 69'ers =

Australian musical group

- Also known as: Peter Knox's New Improved 69'ers, Francis Butlers Original 69'ers
- Origin: Sydney, New South Wales, Australia
- Genres: Rock, pop, jug, country
- Years active: 1969–1976
- Labels: Du Monde, Festival, Infinity
- Past members: see Members section below

The 69'ers were an Australian rock, pop, jug and country band formed in 1969. They released two albums, The 69er's Album (1971) and Francis Butlers 69er's Live (1974). The group toured Australia and appeared at the Sunbury Pop Festival in 1972, 1973, 1974 and 1975. The ensemble went through numerous different members, including two competing line-ups, before finally disbanding in February 1976. According to rock music historian, Ian McFarlane, they played a "good-time mix of vintage rock'n'roll, jugband music and country-swing" and were able to "capture the humour and downright silliness of the form in such a boisterous, zany and garrulous fashion".

== Early years ==
The 69'ers were formed in 1969 in Sydney as an acoustic jug band with Malcolm Billdream on washboard; Francis Butler on guitar, lead vocals, harmonica and kazoo; Graham Coop on guitar and Alex Smith on bass guitar (later in rock band, Bullett). Butler had previously been in Lepers Profound with John Allen on bass guitar, Hans van Kalken on vocals and Terry Wilson on guitar. In mid-1969 the group competed in the "New Sounds of '69" contest organised by Martin Erdman in conjunction with the local radio station, 2UW, and signed a recording contract with Erdman's independent label, Du Monde. By this time the band had acquired Paul Wylde on keyboard.

By 1970, The 69'ers had become a trio with Butler joined by Brian Bethell on bass guitar, guitar and vocals; and Keith Longman on drums and vocals. In late 1970 they released their debut single, "On the Road Again" / "Cup of Tea Take Three". "On the Road Again" was a cover version of the Even Dozen Jug Band song, not the 1968 Canned Heat song of the same name. During the 1970s The 69'ers became popular on the Sydney club circuit. They had a cult following in Collaroy, a northern beach side suburb, where they regularly performed at the 1066 Wine Bar.

== The 69'ers Album ==
In December 1971 The 69'ers issued a second single, "Morning Blues" / "Push Bike Hood". Both singles appeared on their debut album for Du Monde, The 69'ers Album (1971), which was distributed by Festival Records. It was produced by Erdman and included four band originals as well as a range of covers. Session musicians include Buddy Emmons on steel guitar, Keith Harris on banjo, Col Nolan on piano; and later The 69'ers members, Peter Knox and Dave Ovendon on vocals. In 1971 Knox joined on bass guitar, guitar and vocals, he was a veteran of Red McKelvie's Third Union Band and the Original Batterea Heroes.

The 69'ers played for large crowds at open air rock festivals around Sydney including the Odyssey festival at Wallacia (January 1971) and the Bungool Festival of Music, near Windsor, over the 1972-1973 New Year weekend. Following these appearances they regularly toured to Melbourne, Adelaide and Perth working their dance and pub circuits.

== Sunbury 1973 Rock Festival success ==
In August 1972 The 69'ers released their third single, "Harry Rag", which was a cover of a Ray Davies song. Ovendon had joined on drums and vocals and, with former bass guitarist, Bethell, rejoining on lead guitar, formed the a four piece line-up of Butler, Bethell, Knox and Ovendon. In January 1973 they "played a riotous set" at the second annual Sunbury Pop Festival. Their closing song, "Harry Rag", had become their trade mark song although it had never charted. In April it appeared on The Great Australian Rock Festival Sunbury 1973, a triple live album by various artists issued by Mushroom Records. Wherever the band played there was a call from the audience to "Play 'Harry Rag'!". Following their festival performance the Melbourne Truth newspaper ran an article describing them as the Clown Princes of Sunbury in the article, "Are they obscene?", and ran a competition asking whether readers thought they were indeed, obscene. The accusation was based partly on the lyrics of the song, "The 69'ers Theme", which was played often during their live sets and partly due to press reports that Knox, while on stage during a March concert, had invited female audience members backstage for sexual purposes. In late April the group re-recorded a version of "Harry Rag" with a different line-up by John French at TCS Studios, Melbourne.

== The split ==
In April 1973 Brian Bethell, Peter Knox and Dave Ovendon sacked Butler from the band and, added Tony Burkys on guitar (ex Original Battersea Heroes), they renamed themselves as Peter Knox's New Improved 69'ers. Butler responded by forming Francis Butler's Original 69'ers, where he was joined by Ray Ferguson on guitar, vocals, flute and kazoo; Peter Jarman on drums (ex United Kingdom band Flowerpot Men, Denny Laine); and Terry Stacey on bass guitar, vocals and kazoo (Wildwood, Afrika). In November John 'Ernie' McInerney (ex Foreday Riders, Company Caine) replaced Jarman on drums.

According to Stacey, the two bands had somewhat diversified styles. Both retained an image for crazy and often crude humour, however Butler's version were closer to their original jug-band style with country and rock influences. Butler used his Rickenbacker 12-string guitar on country tinged songs. Butler was the band's main songwriter of original material although their recorded output did not reflect it. Knox's version had a more jazz-orientated style doing revivals of 1920s to 1950s swing and doo-wop songs and jazz classics together with many of the band's old favourites. By October 1973, the Butler line-up had reverted to simply, The 69’ers, and continued to tour throughout the East Coast of Australia and to South Australia. Meanwhile, Peter Knox's 69'ers changed their name initially to Omnibus, then Locoweed, and eventually broke up early in 1974.

== Sunbury '74 ==
In January 1974, The 69'ers, with the line-up of Butler, Ferguson, McInerney and Stacey, performed at the Sunbury Pop Festival. Butler headed out into the 30,000 strong crowd to croon "I'm Confessin' (That I Love You)" using a 100-metre microphone cord. They were encored by the audience to play the obligatory "Harry Rag". As the climax of their act they had a cream pie fight where all and sundry were splattered, including compere Molly Meldrum, roadies and sound crew.

In early 1974 a live album, Francis Butler's 69'ers Live, was released: it had been recorded at the previous year's Sunbury Pop Festival with the Butler, Knox, Bethell and Ovenden line-up. The album cover only featured Butler's photo and provided no line-up credits. It had "Harry Rag" on it. The group's live sets did not translate into chart success and they remained a popular "cult" band. In March Stacey left shortly after their Sunbury performance and was replaced by a returning Knox. However Knox left again and Clive Wharton joined on bass guitar and backing vocals.

== Last line-up ==
In 1974 the band issued its last single, "Flash" / "Back Seat Drivin'" on the independent Earth label. For single the group were Butler, Ferguson, McInerney and Wharton. After its release they worked regularly around Sydney and rural New South Wales. Later in 1974, McInerney left to join Richard Clapton's backing band, he was replaced by Rob Harris who stayed for a few months to be replaced by Rob Coady. In August 1975 Ferguson, Wharton and Coady all left to form Flash Harry's Iceberg. The latter day line-up of The 69'ers was Butler, Ian Cameron on guitar, Tom Callaghan on drums and Lindsay Osborne on bass guitar. The group finally broke up in February 1976.

== Afterwards ==
By 1975 Brian Bethall and Dave Ovendon had joined Richard Clapton's backing band and helped record his number four hit on the Australian Kent Music Report Singles Chart, "Girls on the Avenue". In the 1980s Bethall was a member of UK bands, Nine Below Zero and The Blow Monkeys. In 1977 Peter Knox formed Toons with Gavin Hodel on drums and Ian Willis on guitar. In 1979 Knox changed his name to Izzy Forreal and formed an R&B group, The Fabulous Zarsoff Brothers, with Greg Deane (aka Bernie Zarsoff) on piano, vocals and kazoo; Tony Grose (aka Bluey Zarsoff) on guitar, saxophone and vocals; and Tony Verhoeven (aka Terry Zarsoff) on drums. The group issued two albums, Rude Awakening (1984) and Chockablock Full of Live Zarsoffs (1985), on the Browneye Gramophonics label before disbanding in 1988. In 1978 Francis Butler released a solo religious album, There Is no Escape, on independent label, Rhema, before travelling to the United States and becoming a religious minister. Peter Knox died after a heart attack in June 2014.

== Members ==
- Francis Butler – guitar, vocals, harmonica, kazoo (1969–1976)
- Brian Bethall – bass guitar, vocals (1969–1973)
- Keith Longman – drums, vocals (1969–1972)
- Peter Knox – bass, vocals (1972-1973, 1974, died 2014) (Note: A member of Peter Knox's New Improved 69'ers (April to October 1973), which changed its name to Omnibus (October to November 1973), then Locoweed (November 1973 to March 1974). After Locoweed disbanded, Knox rejoined The 69'ers from March to June 1974.)
- Dave Ovendon – drums, vocals (1972-1973)
- Tony Burkys – guitar (1973)
- Ray Ferguson – guitar, vocals, flute, kazoo (1973–1974) (Note: A member of Francis Butlers Original 69'ers, which was renamed as The 69'ers in October 1973.)
- John (Ernie) McInerney – drums (1973–1974)
- Terry Stacey – bass guitar, kazoo, vocals (1973–1974)
- Clive Wharton – bass guitar, backing vocals (1974–1975)
- Rob Harris – drums (1974)
- Rob Coady – drums (1974–1975)
- Tom Callaghan – drums (1975–1976)
- Ian Cameron – guitar (1975–1976)
- Lindsay Osborne – bass (1975–1976)

== Discography ==
=== Singles ===
- "On the Road" / "Cup of Tea Take Three" - 1970
- "Morning Blues" / "Push Bike Hood" - 1971
- "Harry Rag" / "Happiness is Just for Me" - 1972
- "Harry Rag" / "Blood Flash" / "Rag Mama" - 1973
- "Flash" / "Back Seat Drivin'" - 1974

=== Albums ===
- The 69er's Album - 1971
- Francis Butlers 69er's Live - 1974

=== Compilation albums ===
- The Great Australian Rock Festival (compilation album) - 1973 - "Harry Rag" (one track only)
- So You Wanna Be a Rock'n Roll Star (compilation album) - 1988 - "On The Road Again" (one track only)
- The Du Monde Years - 2006 - "Go Back Home", "Harry Rag", "On The Road Again", "Harry Rag" (live)
