= Tinsley Waterhouse =

Australian R&B and blues musician

- Birth name: Tinsley Robert Waterhouse
- Origin: Melbourne, Victoria, Australia
- Genres: R&B; blues
- Occupation: Musician
- Instruments: Vocals; drums
- Years active: 1966–present
- Labels: EMI Custom; Cleopatra
- Formerly of: The Gravy Train; the Horse; Chants R&B

Tinsley Robert Waterhouse is an Australian R&B and blues musician. He has performed in various groups since the late 1960s, initially as a drummer. As a vocalist he led numerous line-ups of the Tinsley Waterhouse Band from July 1980. They have released three albums, After the Mudd You've Got ... The Tinsley Waterhouse Band (October 1982), Hangin' Round (1985), and I've Been Dreaming (1988).

== Biography ==
Tinsley Robert Waterhouse, started as a drummer in the 1960s in Melbourne, first with blues groups, the Gravy Train and then the Horse before briefly joining a New Zealand-formed band, Chants R&B in mid-1967. He formed Tinsley Waterhouse's Old Tracks in 1979, which became the Tinsley-Townsend Band in April of the following year and then the Tinsley Waterhouse Band in July 1980.

In February 1981 the group issued a four-track extended play, Full of Ink an' Talkin' Shorthand, via Project 9 Records. For the EP Waterhouse, on lead vocals, was joined by John Ballard on tenor saxophone and guitar (ex-Phil Manning Band, Broderick Smith's Big Combo), Steve Ewart on trombone, Noel Herridge on drums (ex-Sid Rumpo, Wild Beaver Band, One Armed Bandit), Neil Hodgson on bass guitar (ex-Fox), Gerry Joyce on guitar (ex-Gulliver's Travels), and Sean O'Sullivan on trumpet. Roadrunner's Donald Robertson observed, in April 1981, that it provided, "Enjoyable, undemanding soul/R&B [...] the best track is the one original, 'I've Been Dreaming', which features triffic horns and Mr. Waterhouse's strong gravelly vocals, with feeling."

Tinsley Waterhouse Band's debut album, After the Mudd You've Got ... The Tinsley Waterhouse Band, appeared in October 1982 via EMI Custom. Alongside Waterhouse and Ballard the group's line-up were the latter's ex-Broderick Smith's Big Combo band-mates, Peter Lee on drums, Mick "The Reverend" O'Connor on Hammond organ and Ron Robertson on bass guitar. In March of the following year his backing band were Joyce and Roberston joined by Paul Hitchins on drums (ex-the Sports, Nighthawks), Chris Stockley on guitar (ex-Cam-Pact, Axiom, Dingoes, Stockley See Mason Band, Rock Doctors), and Neil Wyatt on saxophone (ex-Dutch Tilders, Keith Lamb's Airport). By August 1984 Stockley and Robertson were joined by Barry Cram on drums (ex-Michael Turner in Session, Avalanche, Russell Morris Band, Contraband, Ideals) and Leigh Horton on saxophone (ex-Saxons, Pete Watson's Rockhouse).

Tinsley Waterhouse Band's second album, Hangin' Around (1985), was recorded in three separate sessions using three different line-ups. According to Australian musicologist, Ian McFarlane, "As well as covers of a number of R&B; staples like Robert Johnson's 'Sweet Home Chicago' and Jimmy Witherspoon's 'What Becomes of the Broken Hearted?', the album included the single 'Don't Get Mad'." For his third album, I've Been Dreaming (1988), Waterhouse was joined by Cram, Ron Anderson on saxophone, Tim Ayres on bass guitar (ex-Kevin Borich Express), Paul Gatcham on saxophone and Ron "Groper" Trinder on guitar.

In 2010 Waterhouse combined with Driftwood Lounge to issue an album, Blues 'n' Western, via Ray Vonn Records. As of early 2020, Waterhouse, in his seventies, was still performing.

== Discography ==
=== Albums ===
- After the Mudd You've Got ... The Tinsley Waterhouse Band (October 1982) – EMI Custom
- Hangin' Round (1985) – EMI Custom (YPRX-2240)
- Direct from the Black Lagoon (by Tinsley's Lounge Lizards) (1986)
- Live at the Skull Cave (live album, 1986)
- I've Been Dreaming (1988) – Cleopatra Records (CLP252)
- Blues 'n' Western (with Driftwood Lounge) (2010) – Ray Vonn Records (RVRCD102)

=== Extended plays ===
- Full of Ink an' Talkin' Shorthand (February 1981) – Project 9 Records (DD 10081)

=== Singles ===
- "Don't Get Mad" (1985)
