= Sons of Steel =

Sons of Steel may refer to:

- Sons of Steel (1934 film), an American film directed by Charles Lamont
- Sons of Steel (1989 film), an Australian film directed by Gary L. Keady
