= Jeff Duff =

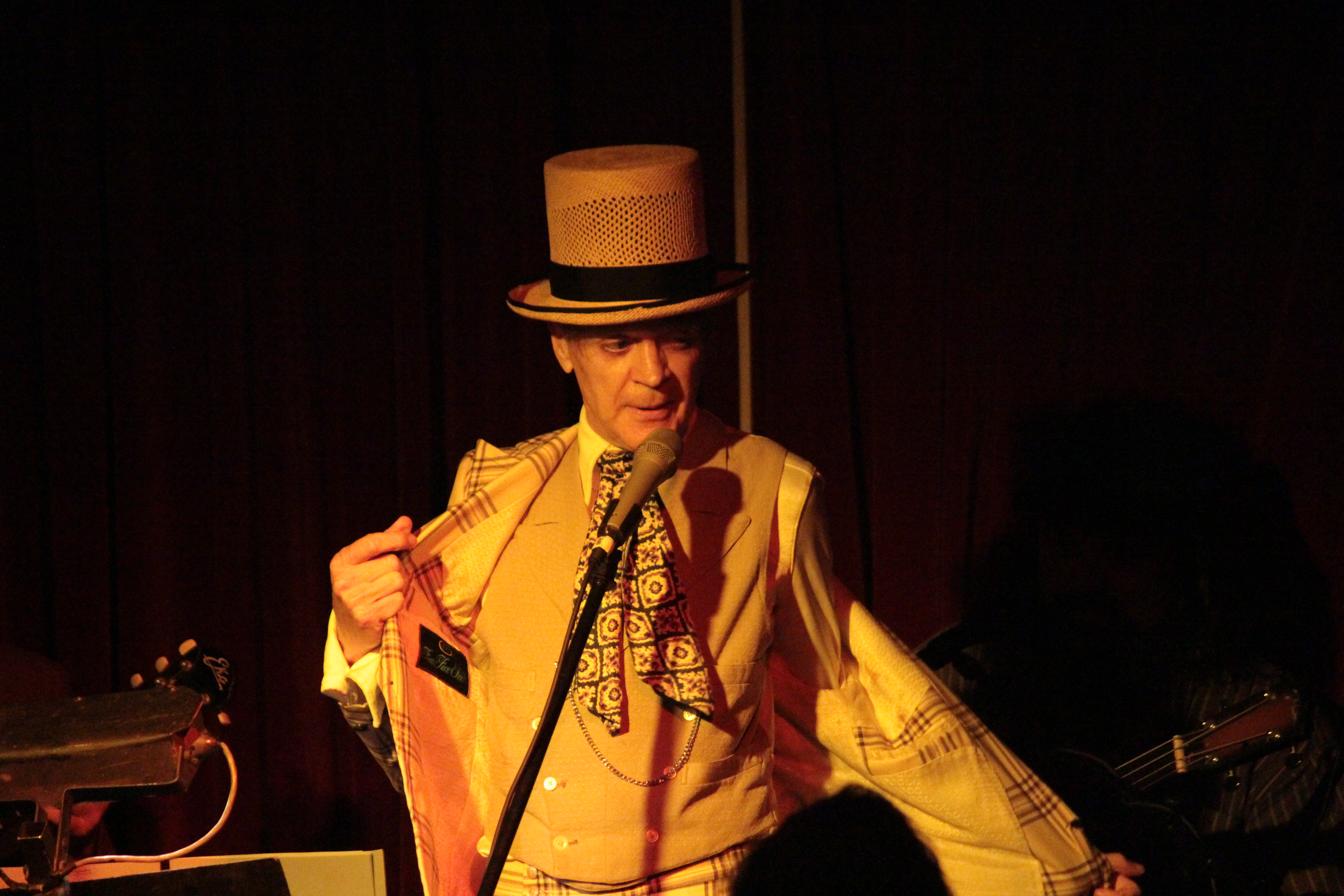

Background information
- Also known as: Duffo; Cyril Trotts
- Born: Geoff Stephen Duff; 1956 (age 69–70)
- Origin: Melbourne, Australia
- Genres: Jazz-rock, glam/pop
- Years active: 1971–present
- Website: www.jeffduff.com

Geoff "Jeff" Stephen Duff, or Duffo, (born 1956) is an Australian singer/cabaret performer in the tenor range, who in his career has used various personae, wardrobe, and satire as features of his performance. Duff's shows Ziggy and Bowie Unzipped are portrayals of the music of David Bowie, whom he met while Bowie was a Sydney resident.

Duff began his musical career in Melbourne in 1971 as a lead singer of the jazz-rock fusion band, Kush (1971–1975, 1977).

== Career ==
Kush were formed with Jeff Duff on vocals, John Santos (aka Montesante) and Colin Chapman on trumpet, Ron Anderson on piano and saxophone, Stephen Ball on keyboards, Tom Cowburn on guitar, harmonica and backing vocals, John Ellis on clarinet, flute and saxophone, Rob Matthews on bass guitar, and Graham McDonald on drums. They released covers of "Peter Gunn", "MacArthur Park" and "Walk on the Wild Side", as well as originals such as "(Livin' on) Easy Street".

Kush is notable for performing to 45,000 people at the 1974 Sunbury Pop Festival, "conceived and promoted as Australia's Woodstock".

Duff relocated to London in 1978 as "the waif-like androgynous oddball Duffo" His keyboard player and arranger for most of this period was Sev Lewkowicz. Duff has released four albums under the name Duffo - four between 1979–82 and a fifth, Ground Control to Frank Sinatra in 2004.

The beginning of the "Duffo" period saw his single, "Give Me Back Me Brain" reached No. 60 on the UK Singles Chart in 1979.

Powderworks issued Duff's third album, Bob the Birdman, in Australia.

His 1999 compilation, Martian Girls Are Easy, is a 40-track, double CD anthology covering Duff's solo career from 1978, described by music historian, Ian McFarlane as showing "the satirical, new wave origins of 'Give Me Back Me Brain', through the soulful classical arrangement of Lou Reed's 'Walk on the Wild Side', dipping into funk on the way and then back to his glam roots"

Jeff Duff appears as 'Secta' in the Australian science fiction movie, Sons of Steel, released in 1989, featuring Duff's single, "Here Come the Freaks".

== Performances ==
Duff has performed on Australian television, and has headlined the Melbourne Jazz Festival, Manly Jazz Festival, Darling Harbor Jazz Festival, Casino Jazz, Thredbo Jazz Festival, Noosa Jazz Festival, and the 2006 Adelaide Cabaret Festival.

Duff performs regularly at Sydney's live music venues. He juxtaposes his twenty-piece big band swing repertoire with the raunchy glam rock of his Alien Sex Gods shows.

== Recent projects ==
Duff's Ground control to Frank Sinatra project merges the styles of David Bowie and Frank Sinatra. The show features dancers, singers, audiovisuals and a nine-piece band. The stage show has produced two albums: Ground Control to Frank Sinatra and Lost in the Stars.

He has paid homage to Bowie in a show called Ziggy, which is a concert production featuring members of Jimmy Barnes' band, Noiseworks and Leo Sayer's band. The Ziggy show performed at the Sydney Opera House in 2010, and September 2012.

Jeff Duff's official David Bowie tribute is the Bowie Unzipped show which has been playing around Australia since 2016 and features a rotating list of Australia's top musicians including Glenn Rhodes on keyboards, bass and vocals, Jak Housden on guitar and vocals, Jess Ciampa on drums, percussion and vocals, Gordon Rytmeister on drums, Rex Goh on guitar, Paul Berton on guitar and Paul Mason on guitar. The Bowie Unzipped band has played sell-out shows in both Sydney and Melbourne and continues to tour around the country.

Duff released his tell-all memoir This Will Explain Everything through Melbourne Books in 2016. After reading the book Alan Howe in The Australian newspaper, said that 'Duff was a musical pioneer and perhaps the most fearless artist in the country.'

== Discography ==
=== Charting singles ===
List of singles, with selected chart positions
Year	Title	Peak chart positions
Year	Title	AUS
1977	"Temptation's 'Bout to Get Me"	73
