= Pantha (band) =

Former Australian pop rock band

- Origin: Melbourne, Australia
- Genres: Pop rock
- Years active: 1973–1977
- Labels: Wizard
- Past members: Dannie Bourne; Paul Curtis; Peter Lee; Adrian Paine; Roger Pell; Jack Wilson; Barry Cram; Jose McLaughlin; Merry Took; Robert Ellis

Pantha were an Australian jazz, rock band formed in 1973 by Dannie Bourne on electric piano, percussion and backing vocals, Paul Curtis on lead vocals and percussion, Peter Lee on congas and percussion, Adrian Paine on drums and percussion, Roger Pell on lead guitar, percussion and backing vocals and Jack Wilson on bass guitar and percussion. The group released one studio album, Doway Do Doway Do (July 1975), which peaked at number 43 on the Australian albums chart. The group disbanded in late 1977.

== History ==
Pantha were formed in Melbourne in 1973 as a rock, jazz group by Dannie Bourne on electric piano, percussion and backing vocals (ex-Hot Dog), Paul Curtis on lead vocals and percussion, Peter Lee on congas and percussion, Adrian Paine on drums and percussion, Roger Pell on lead guitar, percussion and backing vocals (ex-Kush) and Jack Wilson on bass guitar and percussion. Australian musicologist Ian McFarlane described them as performing a "hybrid of rock, jazz, Latin-American and West African music", as they provided "a remarkable depth of musicianship and sense of character and place".

Their debut album, Doway Do Doway Do, was released in July 1975 via Wizard Records. It peaked at No. 43 on the Kent Music Report albums chart. By that time Barry Cram had replaced Paine on drums and Jose McLaughlin replaced Bourne on keyboards. Neither the album's lead single, "I am not Afraid" (November) nor its follow up "Blue House" reached the related top 100 singles chart. Two further singles, "Happiness" (February 1976) and "Melinda" / "Doway Do Doway Do" (December), were released but they did not chart. Early in that year they supported visiting American group, the Doobie Brothers. Lee shifted to drums in early 1977, Merry Took joined on percussion and Robert Ellis replaced Wilson on bass guitar. Late in 1977 Pantha disbanded.

== Members ==
- Dannie Bourne – electric piano, percussion, backing vocals
- Paul Curtis – lead vocals, percussion
- Peter Lee – congas, percussion, drums
- Adrian Paine – drums, percussion
- Roger Pell – lead guitar, percussion, backing vocals
- Jack Wilson – bass guitar, percussion
- Barry Cram – drums
- Jose McLaughlin – keyboards
- Merry Took – percussion
- Robert Ellis – bass guitar

== Discography ==
=== Albums ===
List of studio albums, with Australian positions
Title	Details	Peak chart positions
Title	Details	AUS
Doway Do Doway Do	Released: July 1975; Label: Wizard Records (ZL 212); Formats: Cassette, LP	43

=== Singles ===
Year	Title	Album
1975	"I Am not Afraid"	Doway Do Doway Do !?!!
1975	"Happiness"	non album single
1975	"Melinda" / "Doway Do Doway Do"	Doway Do Doway Do !?!!
