= Diggers Rest Hotel =

Former hotel in the town of Diggers Rest, Victoria, Australia

Coordinates: 37.6352°S 144.7266°E

The Diggers Rest Hotel is an early hotel on the original route to the Bendigo goldfields in the town of Diggers Rest, Victoria, Australia. It was originally built in 1854 and is one of the few Mount Alexander Road goldrush wayside hotels known to survive. A blacksmith and wheelwright shop, and also Cobb & Co stables were established behind the hotel to provide facilities for travellers.

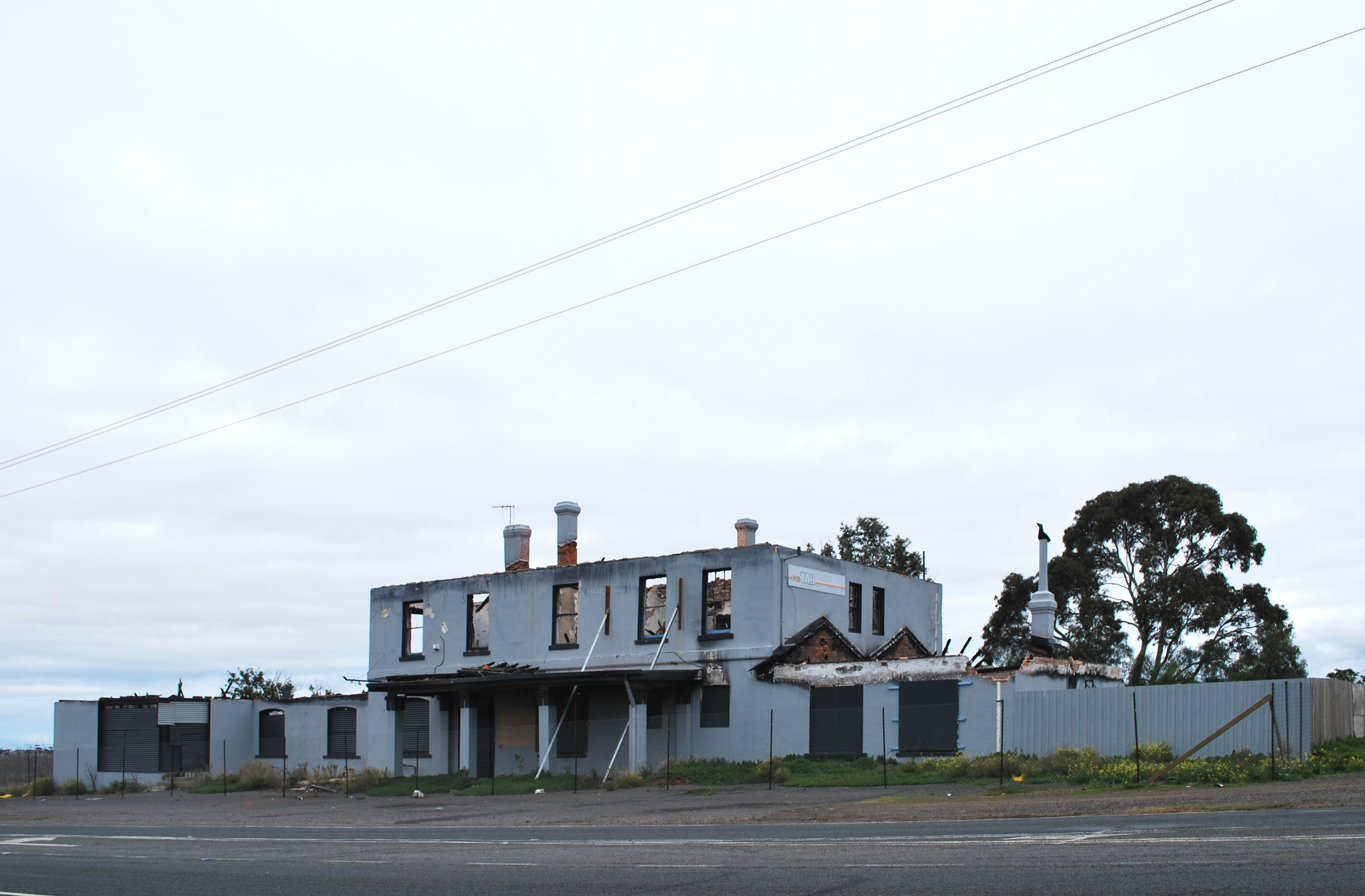
Remains of the Diggers Rest Hotel

The Victorian gold rushes commenced in 1851, first at Ballarat then in late December 1851, 25-30,000 diggers descended on the Mount Alexander goldfield near modern-day Castlemaine. A number of shanties or sly grog shops were operating along the goldfields routes from 1851, one of which evolved into William and Thomas Gregory "Gregory's Inn" by September 1852 at a place where miners camped, appropriately called "Diggers' Rest". Ex-convict William Speary took over operating the inn and then built the present Diggers Rest Hotel in 1854.'

With the construction of the Bendigo railway line in 1859-62, the hotel's business declined. George Lock took over the hotel in 1883 although it was in the ownership of Misses Jane and Emma Sully around this time and up to 1892, when Lock bought the freehold and renamed it the 'Oval Hotel'.

However, between the two world wars, the development of the motor car and competition with the railway from road transport saw the hotel's fortunes revived, and the building was substantially enlarged and modified. In 1938 the hotel was renovated by the new owner Mrs Cameron, in response to the growing motor traffic on the recently proclaimed Calder Highway. Further alterations were made in the 1970s, with a bottleshop and cool room and a games room added and the rear parlour converted into an extended saloon bar, and a number of internal renovations occurred in the area of the ground floor lounges. One of these was the bricking up to 5 feet from the ground a door and a window, today the westernmost windows on the original building.

In the 1970s it was briefly famous as the nearest hotel to the Sunbury Pop Festival site, and became the site of scuffles with police.

The hotel was partly destroyed by fire in October 2008, leaving only the walls and chimneys standing. Since the fire there have been separate campaigns in the local community to have the hotel rebuilt and reopened, or demolished.

The novel The Diggers Rest Hotel by Geoffrey McGeachin won the Ned Kelly Awards for crime writing in 2011.

== See also ==
- List of hotels
