= Buttlejorrk =

Buttlejorrk Parish
- Cadastral division
- Coordinates: 37.579°S 144.678°E
- Country: Australia
- State: Victoria
- County: Bourke
Lands administrative divisions around Buttlejorrk Parish
Kerrie	Kerrie	Kerrie
Gisborne	Buttlejorrk Parish	Bolinda
Yangardook	Holden	Bulla Bulla

Buttlejorrk is a parish of the County of Bourke located to the west of Sunbury, in Victoria, Australia and a neighbourhood within the locality of Diggers Rest. It was named in 1839 by the surveyor William Darke. A township developed and was initially known as Aitken's Gap. By the 1890s it had commonly become known as Buttlejorrk. A Post Office opened on 5 September 1856 as The Gap, was renamed Buttlejork (sic) in 1875 and closed in 1919. One of the early settlers in the area was George Millett. George and his wife Suzanne established the Bald Hill Hotel, the first staging stop out of Melbourne on the road to the goldfields at Bendigo. The hotel was licensed in 1853 until 1907. The Aitken's Gap Gaol, now located in the forecourt of the Sunbury Police Station stood beside the hotel

Segment of The Gap, Buttlejorrk Town Map

== History ==
It was reported in the Argus 21 October 1852- "Bushrangers at Aitken's Gap-Five armed and mounted bushrangers "bailed" up and robbed a gentleman riding in the neighbourhood of Aitken's Gap on Tuesday morning last about 11 o'clock". A settlement also grew at Aitken’s Gap, which was one of the key stages of the trip to the gold-fields. It was still a wild place in 1858 when traveller William Kelly arrived on the coach:- "Arrived at the top, it was a scene of extraordinary bustle and uproar, for it was then a special camping place for drivers and carriers, and the scores upon scores of horse drays and bullock-wagons that were preparing for a start, produced an amount of tumult, altercation, blasphemy, and compound abominations which would not find many readers even if I succeeded in reproducing it."

Why this spot was a staging-post is not clear. Perhaps it had to do with the achievement of the summit, and the end of the long haul that finished the 'Keilor Plains' stage of the journey. No doubt a spring of water, the branch of the Kororoit Creek which passed there, was vital.

Bald Hill Hotel Buttlejorrk circa 1890

However, when John Chandler and his horses arrived there "nearly famished" some years beforehand he had had to buy five buckets of water, at two shillings a bucket, at a shanty. Hotels (the Gap Inn, the Manchester and the Bald Hill) and stores were erected in the vicinity, and in 1854 the Government moved to formalise the township. The original Gap Inn and a store (in which a post office was established in 1856) were located centrally on a block of the main street on the Government’s later survey. Archaeological evidence remains of the Gap and Bald Hill inns. There were also burials behind the Aitkens Gap hotel; these may have been removed very early. Aitken’s Gap police station was by far the largest forage requirement in the whole of the Bourke District, indicative of its significance as a changing station for the gold escort. Together with most of the other wayside 1850s goldrush police stations, it was closed down in the early 1863 after the railway was opened to Bendigo. Most buildings were removed elsewhere, but the sturdy bluestone police lock-up has to remain. It survived in a deteriorated condition as a farm outbuilding until its removal and reconstruction in Sunbury in 1989. Its former site is now on a new house block; a bench associated with a former building appears to remain, along with a scatter of hand-made bricks that could have come from the chimney that had been added to it at a later date. It is likely that this site retains archaeological evidence of a seminal, ephemeral, and colourful event in Australia’s history. It may constitute rare evidence of an inter-town police station, an integral part of the main goldrush roads.

As the Bendigo railway beyond Sunbury opened in stages from 1859, The Gap’s fortunes declined dramatically. It struggled on as a town serving a local farming community. A Church of England school opened at the settlement in 1857, and a state school continued until 1900. In the 1990s no relic could be found of the Caroline Chisholm shelter shed that had been erected at the Gap during the gold rush. The one surviving row of the avenue of old Monterey pines (Pinus radiata) on the Calder Highway is today the most prominent evidence of the former township. The pines could have been planted at any time between the 1870s and 1920s, probably as part of a Melton Shire town beautification policy. They are the same as those that survive on Gap Road and several of the streets of Sunbury that were once a part of Melton Shire. (Maybe they served to mark Melton’s fragile proprietorship in the area.) In Victoria conifer plantings had been recommended for street planting in the 1860s, but from the 1880s they were often replaced by deciduous trees, and the Monterey pines at Aitkens Gap are one of only a few stands of old conifer street plantings which remain in Victoria.

== Fire ==
It was reported in the Argus on Friday 6 April that Mr. Chandler, of the Legislative assembly. held an inquest yesterday upon the cause of a trifling fire which occurred on the 17th ult, in a bedroom at the Bald Hills Hotel, Aitken's Gap. After hearing the evidence adduced, the jury found that the fire was accidentally caused by a little boy, the son of the landlord, having set fire to the place by striking a match with which to light a candle.

On 14 January 1944 a fire that stretched from Woodend to the Gap destroyed 30 houses and devastated the Couangalt area just north of the Shire. Melton Shire property owners, Messrs Borbidge, Gilligan, Millett, had narrow escapes. The Toolern Brigade working on the west side of the front were unable to prevent 2100 acres of Mr Scott’s Mount Aitken estate, and its historic 14 room bluestone house, being burnt out. But they stopped the flames just to the south, on the doorstep of Mr Townsing’s farm (originally the Beaty’s Rocklands), where 700 tons of hay was stacked. Mr R Benson also lost a house. It may also have been this fire that destroyed the timber part of the cottage on the Shire boundary on Blackhill Road.

== Preservation ==
The loss of several local heritage landmarks in Sunbury in the late 1980s spurred Peter Free to campaign to preserve the Aitkens Gap Gaol. The Sunbury Historical and Heritage Society president achieved his aim in 1992 after securing $24,000 in state funding. The jail was not only saved from demolition and restored but relocated as well. Mr Free and volunteers from Rupertswood Battery moved all the jail’s bluestone "bricks" from its original site at the Gap to the Sunbury police station. "We numbered every one and laid them out on the lawn of the police station," he said. Stonemason Tom Molyneax was in charge of the project that was also supported by local police and the former Bulla Shire Council. Mr Free said the jail had a chequered past. Built in 1857, it had two cells but during the gold rush boom the cells were used to store gold nuggets. Prisoners were instead kept outside in shackles. Mr Free’s next vision is to create a rail museum to celebrate 150 years of rail in Sunbury. Aitkens Gap Gaol is part of the Old Sunbury Township heritage drive developed by the Sunbury District Heritage Society. President Veronica Burgess said the drive was built on four existing Sunbury Heritage Walks, with brochures to be available from the Sunbury Tourist Centre next month. Other Sunbury landmarks on the drive include:

- The Ball Court Hotel, built on the site of the Farmers Arm Hotel;
- Dunblane, an early Sunbury mansion built in 1893;
- The Sunbury Cemetery, Jacksons Hill and the Sunbury Asylum;

== Other names ==
Buttlejorrk has also been known as

- Aitken's Gap
- The Gap
