= Diggers Rest =

- Suburb
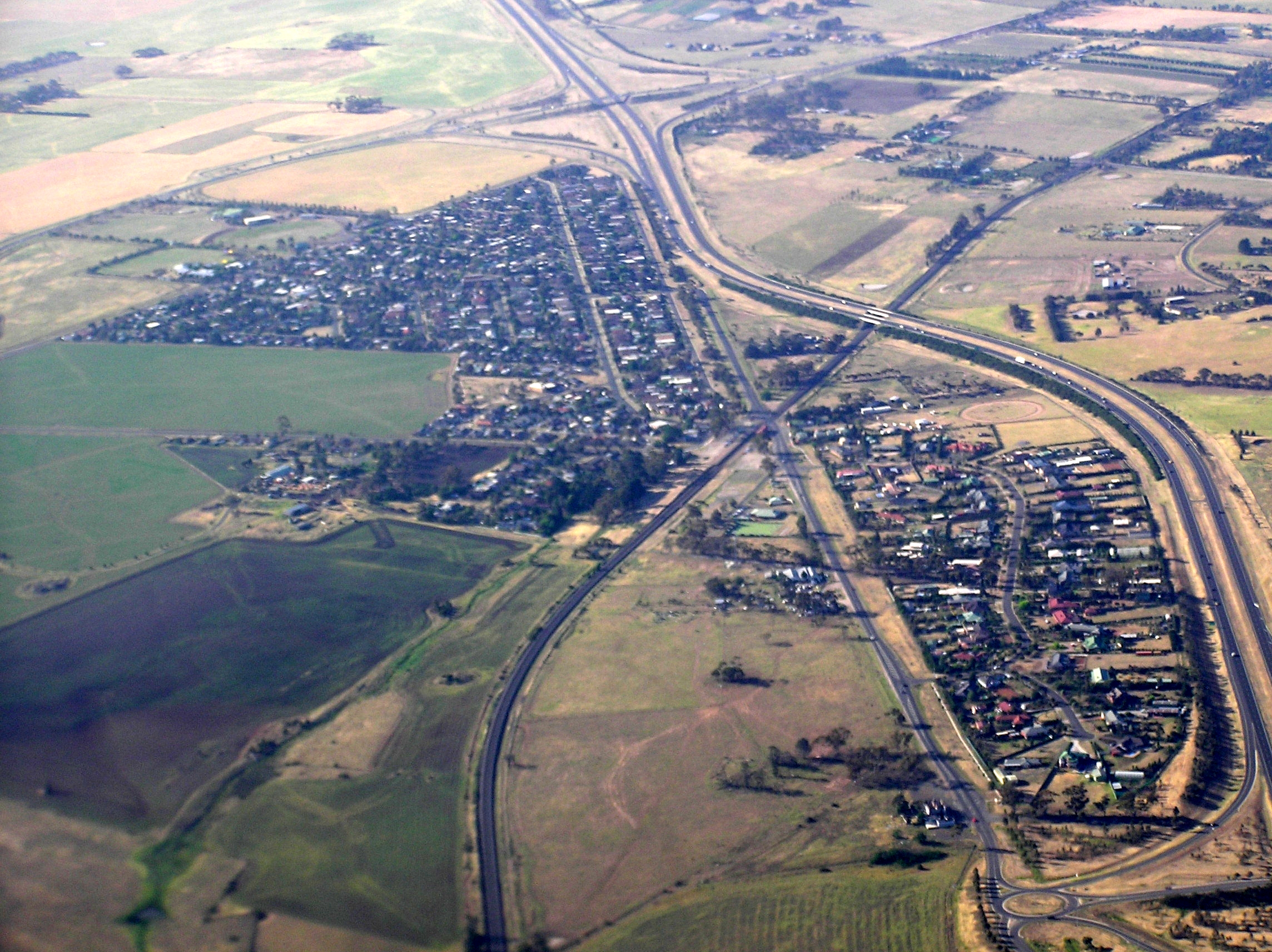
- View from south east

- Interactive map of Diggers Rest
- Coordinates: 37°37′41″S 144°43′16″E
- Country: Australia
- State: Victoria
- LGAs: City of Hume; City of Melton
- Location: 33 km (21 mi) from Melbourne; 5 km (3.1 mi) from Sunbury
- Established: 1874

Government
  - State electorate: Sunbury
  - Federal division: Hawke
- Elevation: 153 m (502 ft)

Population
  - Total: 5,669 (2021 census)
- Postcode: 3427
Suburbs around Diggers Rest
Gisborne South	Sunbury	Bulla; Sunbury
Toolern Vale	Diggers Rest	Bulla
Plumpton	Bonnie Brook; Fraser Rise	Calder Park; Keilor North

Diggers Rest (formerly Diggers' Rest) is a suburb in Victoria, Australia. It is 28 km (17 mi) and 29 minutes north-west of Melbourne's Central Business District, located within the Cities of Hume and Melton local government areas. Diggers Rest recorded a population of 5,669 at the 2021 census.

Diggers Rest lies on the Old Calder Highway, near the Calder Freeway.

== History ==
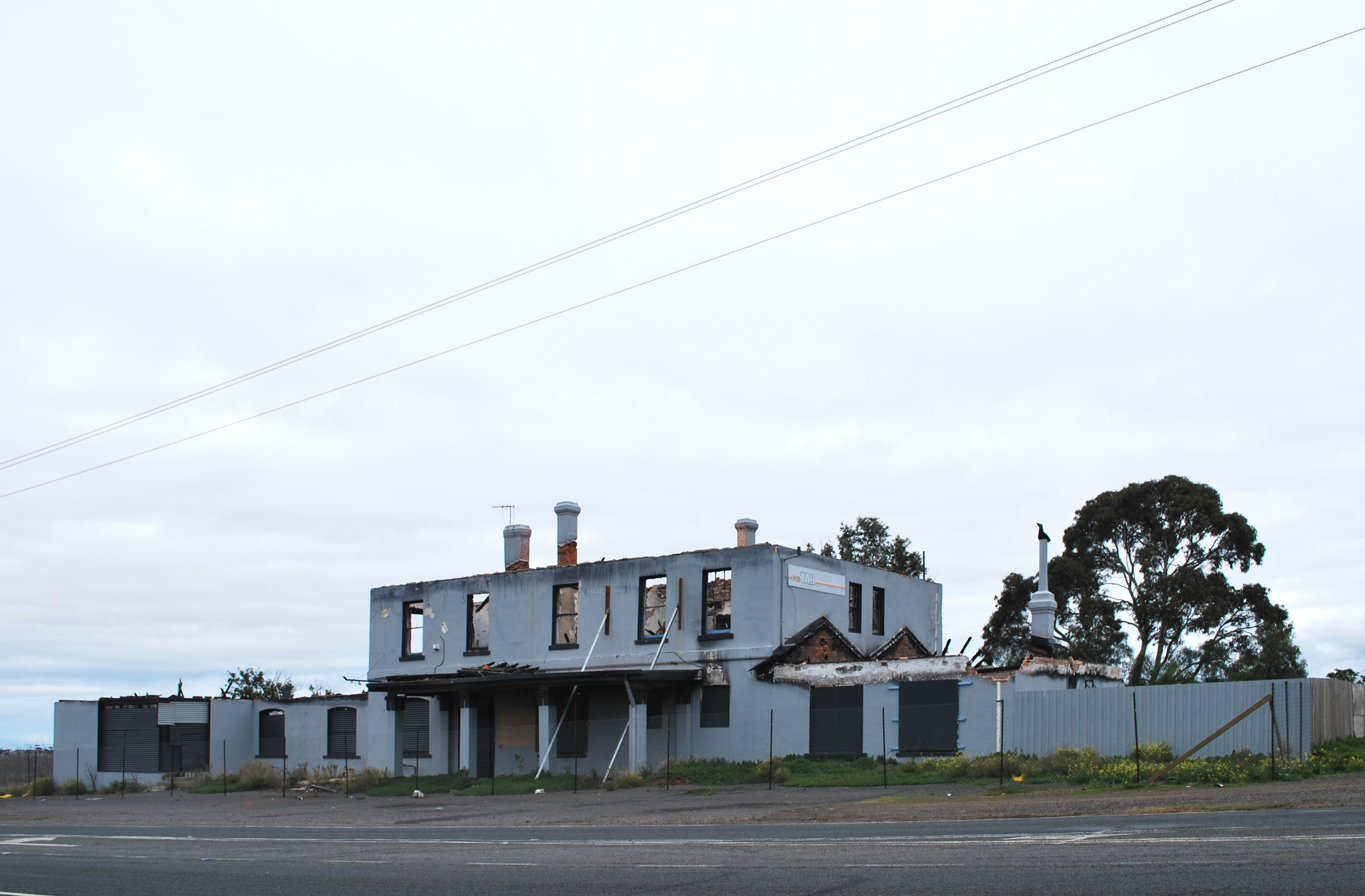
Diggers Rest Hotel Ruins

Diggers Rest began life as a stopping place on the road to the Bendigo goldfields, with the Post Office opening on 18 June 1860. Caroline Chisholm started a women's shelter in the area. The town grew in the 1870s and 1880s and became a postal village with a general store, post office, weighbridge, mechanics' institute and a chaff mill. The Diggers Rest Hotel was built by 1854, and later enlarged, and became an important stopping place on the route to the goldfields. It was severely damaged by fire.

Diggers Rest is referred to as being famous for the first controlled powered flight of an aeroplane undertaken in Australia. The flight was performed by Harry Houdini on 18 March 1910. A café in town is named in his honour.

To the north of Diggers Rest township within the locality is the former township known as Aitken's Gap, The Gap or Buttlejorrk.

== Sunbury Rock Festival ==
The four Sunbury Pop Festivals were held on the same 620-acre (2.5 km^{2}) private farm along Jacksons Creek, on the southern outskirts of Sunbury, between Sunbury and Diggers Rest. The property was owned by farmer and local identity George Duncan, and the property has become known in the district over the years simply as "Duncan's farm". The entrance gates to the Sunbury Pop Festivals were off Watsons Road. Also because of its proximity (2 km; 1.2 mi) to the smaller township of Diggers Rest, many of the attendees who traveled to Sunbury by train, actually alighted at Diggers Rest railway station, and not Sunbury.

== Present day ==
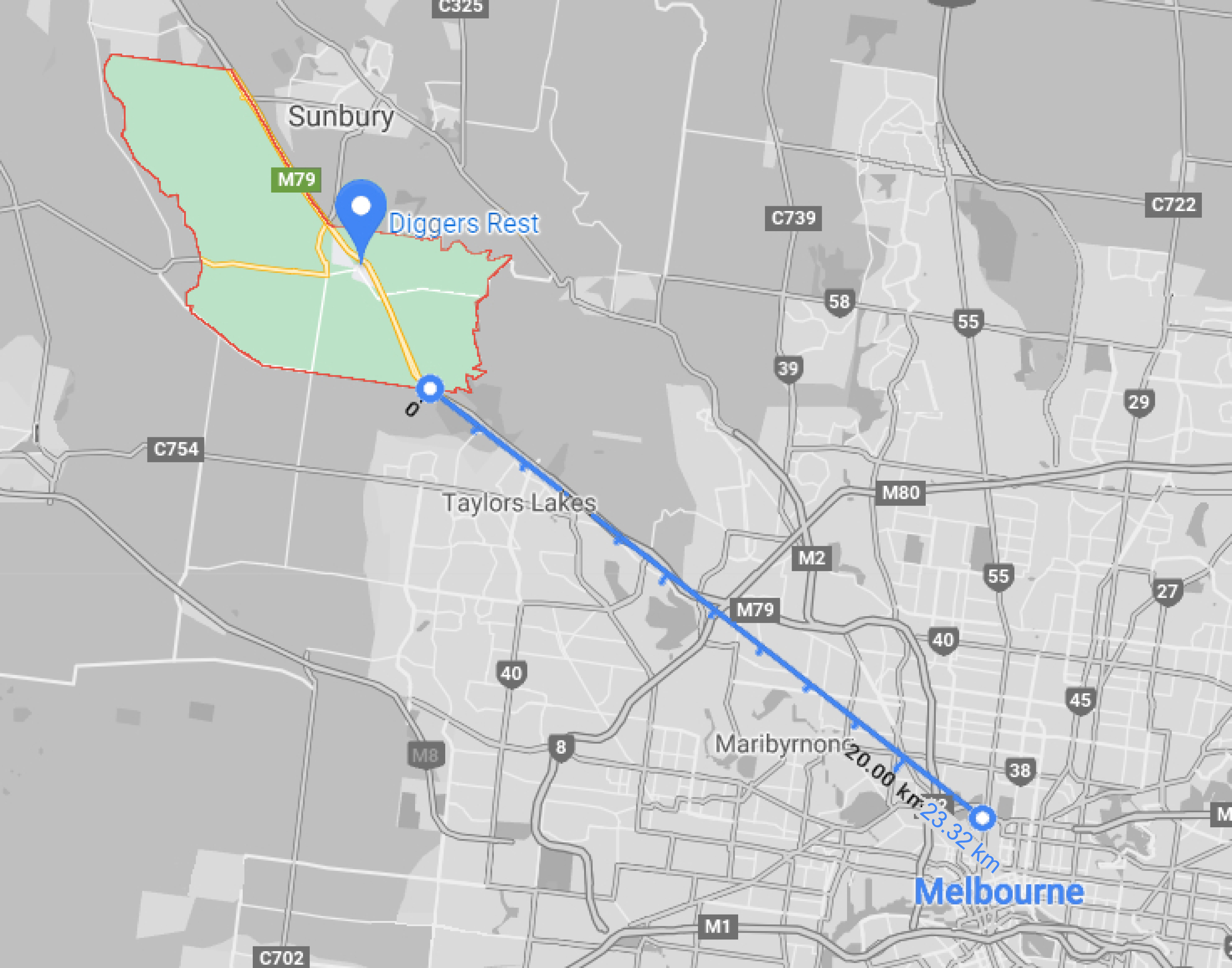
Aerial Distance from Diggers Rest to Melbourne is 23.32 km (14.5 mi)

Diggers Rest contains a general store, a primary school and a CFA fire station, along with three large recreation reserves. Sporting groups in Diggers Rest include Diggers Rest Football Club, which play in the Riddell District Football League.

Diggers Rest Primary School was first opened in 1882 and moved to its present site in 1990. Diggers Rest Primary School features excellent facilities including air conditioned and heated classrooms, computer and Internet access to all grades, modern sports and playground equipment and landscaped grounds. Diggers Rest Primary School is an integral part of the wider community and hosts annual events such as the Community Carols, Billy Cart Derby and Grandparents' Day.

Other facilities in the Diggers Rest area include the Holden Flora and Fauna Reserve, Animal Land Children's Farm and SPSK Jadran, and a Slovenian social club which services nearby St Albans and Keilor.

Diggers Rest also has a Scout Group containing Cub Scouts and Scouts. They meet at the Diggers Rest Reserve behind the tennis club rooms.

== Transport ==
=== Road ===
The Calder Freeway runs through Diggers Rest, connecting it to both the Melbourne CBD, Sunbury, and beyond. Vineyard Road also links Diggers Rest to Sunbury.

=== Rail ===
Diggers Rest has a railway station on the Sunbury line, connecting the town with Melbourne's CBD.

=== Buses ===
Two bus routes run through Diggers Rest.

475 : Sunbury station - Diggers Rest station. Operated by Sunbury Bus Service.

483 : Sunbury station - Moonee Ponds via Diggers Rest. Operated by Sunbury Bus Service.

== See also ==
- Shire of Bulla – Parts of Diggers Rest were previously within this former local government area.
- Harry Houdini: The Aviator – Houdini's flight at Diggers Rest, Friday, 18 March 1910.
