= Sunbury Pop Festival =

Former musical festival in Australia

Coordinates: 37.618°S 144.743°E

- Genre: Rock, pub rock
- Dates: 29 – 31 January 1972; 27 – 29 January 1973; 25 – 28 January 1974; 25 – 27 January 1975
- Locations: George Duncan's farm 2 km NE of Diggers Rest, Victoria, Australia; 30 km NW of Melbourne
- Years active: 1972–1975
- Founders: John Fowler (Odessa Promotions)

Sunbury Pop Festival or Sunbury Rock Festival was an annual Australian rock music festival held on a 620-acre (2.5 km^{2}) private farm between Sunbury and Diggers Rest, Victoria, which was staged on the Australia Day (26 January) long weekend from 1972 to 1975. It attracted up to 45,000 patrons and was promoted by Odessa Promotions, which was formed by a group of television professionals, including John Fowler, from GTV 9 Melbourne.

Although conceived and promoted as Australia's Woodstock, the Sunbury Pop Festivals signalled the end of the hippie peace movement of the late 1960s and the beginning of the reign of pub rock. The early festivals were financially successful and featured performances by Australian and New Zealand bands including, Billy Thorpe & the Aztecs, Max Merritt and the Meteors, Chain and Wild Cherries. Various live albums were recorded at the festivals including Aztecs Live! At Sunbury issued in September 1972, which peaked at No. 3 on the Go-Set Top 20 Albums; and the triple live album, Sunbury 1973 - The Great Australian Rock Festival which was the inaugural release by Mushroom Records.

Looking to pull in bigger crowds, the founders booked international acts with British rock band Queen performing in 1974. They arrived late, and were initially booed by a crowd who expected to see home grown acts, but they finished their set despite crowd screams of "go back to Pommyland, ya pooftahs". Lead singer Freddie Mercury retorted with "When we come back to Australia, Queen will be the biggest band in the world!". A fledgling Skyhooks were also booed and returned the following year with a new lead singer, Graeme "Shirley" Strachan. In 1975 another British band, Deep Purple, were head-liners. A fracas developed on-stage between Deep Purple's roadies and AC/DC's roadies and members. Due to poor weather and high ticket prices the attendance was down to 16,000. Odessa Promotions was liquidated after paying out Deep Purple but most local acts were not paid by Odessa. Late in the year, Deep Purple placed money into a fund so that unpaid artists were paid at the full musician's rate.

In 2015, the Sunbury Pop Festival was inducted into the Music Victoria Hall of Fame.

== History ==
Sunbury Pop Festival was an annual Australian rock music festival that was the seventh of more than a dozen major outdoor rock festivals staged in Australia between 1970 and 1975, but it was the only one that became a continuing event, at least for four years. It was promoted by Odessa Promotions, which was formed by a group of television professionals headed by John Fowler from GTV9 in Melbourne. Festival publicist Jim McKay recalled, "It was a good idea over coffee at the Channel Nine canteen... We were a bit bored, wondering what to do next... Why don't we do a pop festival, like Woodstock?" From late 1971, Odessa Promotions touted the forthcoming festival as "41 hours of non-stop entertainment. Sunbury, the rock happening of 1972. Three days of sun-filled togetherness".

In Australia, Sunbury signalled the end of the hippie peace movement of the late 1960s and the beginning of the reign of pub rock. According to Australian music writer, James Cockington, "The Woodstock spirit of peace and love and bad brown acid was largely replaced here by VB, Tooheys and West End, depending on the state". In a 2003 interview for Melbourne newspaper, The Age, on the 30th anniversary of the second festival, Chain guitarist Phil Manning, who performed there, commented:

"It was a time when the hippie thing was declining and the drunken afternoons of too much beer, sun and basic rock developed. The music went from being experimental to being just moronic entertainment for yobbos".

Sunbury—which has often been compared to Woodstock—has been accorded a legendary status in the history of Australian rock. Claims persist that it marked a turning point because it featured an all-Australian line-up, but this is misleading, as there had already been several "All-Australian" festivals by the time of Sunbury '72 and some of the performers there were New Zealanders. Sunbury has acquired its status due to its financial success, which enabled it to run annually for four years, and because the inaugural festival was comprehensively documented on film and multi-track audio, which gave it a privileged status in the visual media compared with other contemporary festivals.

The film, Sunbury (1972), was produced and directed by John Dixon, with Ray Wagstaff as coordinating director, and includes footage of Billy Thorpe & the Aztecs, Max Merritt and the Meteors, Chain, Wild Cherries, Pirana and SCRA. Artists and audience members were interviewed by Go-Set journalist, Ian "Molly" Meldrum including a naked woman, "What sort of made you sort of just get up and shed your clothes like this?"

Another large festival, the Meadows Technicolour Fair, was staged in South Australia near Meadows township, 32 km (20 mi) from Adelaide over the same long weekend in 1972. This event attracted almost 30,000 people, and featured many of the same Australian acts, as well three imported acts: singers Mary Hopkin, Tom Paxton and pop band Edison Lighthouse. This festival attracted almost as many people as Sunbury, despite South Australia having less than 10% of the eastern states population. The Meadows festival was not filmed nor recorded and has remained virtually unreported, it is not mentioned in any of the major print references on Australian rock music.

Music entrepreneur Michael Gudinski was involved with the first Sunbury festival—as well as managing several major acts that appeared—he operated a lucrative concession selling watermelon to festival-goers. British-owned record company EMI released a double-album of live performances from the 1972 festival. Gudinski's new record company, Mushroom Records, established later in 1972, became associated with Sunbury thanks to its inaugural release, a three-disc set of live recordings from the 1973 festival. Billy Thorpe & the Aztecs also released a live album of their performance that year on the independent Havoc Records label.

In 1973, the festival included its first international act - Spirit featuring the Staehely Brothers, John (guitar) and Al (bass), with drummer Stu Perry. They played in the line-up not long after Indelible Murtceps, Spectrum's alter ego, and were well received. The Staehely Brothers had been touring Australia for several weeks.

In 1974, Queen arrived 2 hours late, and according to some, were initially booed during their set to screams of "go back to Pommyland, ya pooftahs". Lead singer, Freddie Mercury retorted, "When we come back to Australia, Queen will be the biggest band in the world!" In May 2009, on Spicks and Specks, Daddy Cool front man Ross Wilson disputed this as an urban legend and said Queen finished their set, even doing an encore. The early version of Skyhooks were also booed and, after watching a recording of their performance, lead singer Steve Hill quit and was replaced by Graeme "Shirley" Strachan.

Although not included in the LP of video of the 1973 event, on the Sunday Morning St Paul's Cathedral provided a Rock Mass, convened by Rev David Sankey with music written and arranged by Royston Wilding, who also played guitars and clavinet and was joined by several other musicians.

The 1975 festival ran at a loss with head liners Deep Purple pocketing $60,000 while most local bands were unpaid when Odessa Promotions was liquidated soon after the event.

Periodically attempts are made to resurrect Sunbury, in 2005 promoter Michael Chugg tried to revive the concept. The widespread success of alternative rock festivals since the 1990s (for example, the Big Day Out) make a successful resurrection unlikely.

== Location ==
The four Sunbury Pop Festivals were held on the same 620-acre (2.5 km^{2}) private farm along Jacksons Creek, 3.5 km south of Sunbury and 2 km north-east of Diggers Rest. The property was owned by 50-year-old farmer and local identity George Duncan who offered the use of his land at no cost to the organisers. Duncan and his son, George Jr, volunteered to erect the site fences and, for subsequent festivals, gave permission for organisers to construct permanent toilets and rubbish bins. The property was known locally as "Duncan's farm". The entrance gates to the Sunbury Pop Festival were off Watsons Road, Diggers Rest. Promoters rejected the name of Diggers Rest '72 in favour of Sunbury '72 as being more suggestive of a good time and sunny destination.

The festival venue was closer to the smaller township of Diggers Rest, so many attendees who travelled by train alighted at Diggers Rest railway station, and not Sunbury. The Diggers Rest Hotel became a de facto festival bar and site of scuffles between fans and police.

Residential subdivision in the area has since altered the landscape and restricted public access to the site. Despite the Bulla Shire Council (merged with the Hume City Council in 1994) opposing the original festival, Hume Council now holds the site to be of national heritage significance for its connection to the Festival and Mushroom Records.

== Attendances ==
Although the 1972 Sunbury Pop Festival was not the first held in Australia, it benefited from a high level of publicity and, despite flagging attendances at the 1975 festival, it consistently attracted large crowds. As many as 40,000 people attended Sunbury in 1972, although figures vary considerably depending on the source, and more conservative estimates place the figure between 30,000 and 35,000. Looking back in 1973, promoter John Fowler, who worked with property owner George Duncan, as site manager, said "The papers put it at anything from 25 to 60,000 people. How can you tell for sure?" In 1974 about 30,000 attended. The final festival had a crowd of 16,000 which was affected by poor weather and the higher cost of admission.

== 1972 ==
The first Sunbury Pop Festival was touted as the "Rock Happening of 1972" and ran from 29 to 31 January. The attendance was approximately 35,000 and the entry fee was $6.00 (3 days), $5.00 (2 days), $1.00 (1 day). EMI/His Master's Voice released a double-album of live performances, Sunbury by various artists: The La De Da's, Pirana, Spectrum, Indelible Murtceps, Max Merritt & the Meteors, SCRA and Billy Thorpe & the Aztecs. Calendar Records issued a single live album, The Stars of Sunbury! with Billy Thorpe & the Aztecs, Country Radio, Pilgrimage, Chain and Wild Cherries (credited to lead guitarist Lobby Loyde). Meanwhile, Billy Thorpe & the Aztecs released their own double-disc, Aztecs Live! At Sunbury by September, which peaked at No. 3 on the Go-Set Top 20 Albums. John Dixon directed and produced the film, Sunbury (1972).

Band line-up

The 1972 festival was opened by progressive rockers, Madder Lake. MCed by Gerry Humphrys, one-time lead singer of 1960s group, The Loved Ones.

- Blackfeather
- The Bushwhackers & Bullockies Bush Band
- The Captain Matchbox Whoopee Band
- Glenn Cardier
- Carson
- Chain
- Company Caine
- Greg Quill & Country Radio
- Friends
- Healing Force
- Highway
- Indelible Murtceps
- The La De Da's
- MacKenzie Theory
- Phil Manning
- Max Merritt & the Meteors
- Mulga Bill's Bicycle Band
- Barrie McAskill & Levi Smith's Clefs
- Pilgrimage
- Pirana
- Wendy Saddington
- SCRA
- Spectrum
- Tamam Shud
- Billy Thorpe & The Aztecs
- Total Fire Band
- Wild Cherries
- [St Paul's Cathedral Rock Mass Band]

Although not included in the LP of video of the 1972 event, on the Sunday Morning (30 January) St Paul's Cathedral provided a Rock Mass, convened by Rev David Sankey with music written and arranged by Julian Cairns, who also played clavinet and was joined by several other musicians.

=== Charts ===
Chart (1972)	Peak position
Australia (Kent Music Report)	28

== 1973 ==
Sunbury '73 ran from 27 to 29 January. The attendance was 25,000 - 30,000 and the entry fee was $8.00 (3 days), $7.00 (2 days), $5.00 (1 day). Promoter, John Fowler provided a documentary, Sunbury 1973, which was aired on GTV9. Music entrepreneur Michael Gudinski was involved with the first Sunbury festival—as well as managing several major acts that appeared—he operated a lucrative concession selling watermelon to festival-goers. His new record company, Mushroom Records, was established with Ray Evans late in 1972. It became associated with Sunbury thanks to its inaugural album, a three-disc set of live recordings from the 1973 festival, Sunbury 1973 - The Great Australian Rock Festival. Guitarist, Lobby Loyde and his band, Coloured Balls were joined on-stage by Billy Thorpe and Leo de Castro (Friends) to record a live set, Summer Jam, which was issued in November. Carson released their own live album, On the Air in April but had disbanded by that time. Veteran rocker, Johnny O'Keefe, was initially booed but won the crowd over by his performance and went on to do several encores.

Band line-up

The 1973 festival was MCed by comedian Paul Hogan.

- Bakery
- Band of Light
- Blackfeather
- The Captain Matchbox Whoopee Band
- Glenn Cardier
- Carson
- Coloured Balls
- Country Radio
- The Flying Circus
- Friends
- Healing Force
- Indelible Murtceps
- MacKenzie Theory
- Madder Lake
- Margret RoadKnight
- Max Merritt & the Meteors
- Mighty Mouse
- Mississippi (backed by a full orchestra)
- Mulga Bill's Bicycle Band
- Johnny O'Keefe
- Sid Rumpo
- Spirit featuring the Staehely Brothers
- Matt Taylor
- Spectrum
- The 69'ers
- Dutch Tilders
- Billy Thorpe & the Aztecs
- St Paul's Cathedral Rock Mass Band

=== Charts ===
Chart (1973)	Peak position
Australia (Kent Music Report)	23

== 1974 ==
Sunbury '74 ran from 25 to 28 January. The attendance was approximately 30,000 and the entry fee was $12.00 (3 days), $10.00 (2 days), $5.00 (1 day). A new concept of a second performing stage was added to include alternative performances such as jazz recitals, theatre, dance, mime, poetry and acoustic music. Mushroom Records released two separate albums, Highlights of Sunbury '74 Part 1 and Highlights of Sunbury '74 Part 2. Blackfeather issued their own album, Blackfeather Live!. The 69'ers released, Francis Butler's 69ers Live from the previous year's performance.

This was the first appearance in Australia of British rock band Queen. Many sources claim that Queen were booed off stage. In May 2009, on Spicks and Specks, Daddy Cool front man Ross Wilson disputed this as an urban legend and said Queen finished their set, even doing an encore. Lead singer Freddie Mercury bravely told the audience "When we come back to Australia, Queen will be the biggest band in the world!" Queen returned to Australia to perform again in 1976 at the height of their fame. The early version of Australian group Skyhooks were also booed and, after watching a TV broadcast of their performance, lead singer Steve Hill quit the band and was replaced by Graeme "Shirley" Strachan.

Band line-up

The MC was former The Masters Apprentices lead singer Jim Keays.

- Ayers Rock
- Ballet Victoria
- Blackfeather
- Buster Brown
- Chain
- Commonwealth Youth in Concert
- Daddy Cool
- The Dingoes
- Full Moon
- Kush
- MacKenzie Theory
- Matt Taylor
- Madder Lake
- Mississippi
- Pirana
- Queen
- Ross Ryan
- Sid Rumpo
- The 69'ers
- Skyhooks
- Skylight
- Sherbet

== 1975 ==
Sunbury '75 ran from 25 to 27 January. The attendance was only 15,000-16,000 and the festival suffered terminal financial losses. The entry fee was $20.00 (2022:$150). A second stage was repeated for this year to cater for "alternative" acts such as dance, mime, poetry and acoustic music. A rock opera, Australia – The Sunbury Symphony was commissioned.

British hard rock band Deep Purple went home with $60,000 (2022:$450,000), while most local groups went home empty handed. AC/DC allegedly refused to play after Deep Purple roadies provoked a fistfight with them. According to Deep Purple's lead vocalist, David Coverdale, "Apparently, a young Aussie band had jumped onstage, plugged into our gear and started playing! Well, all hell broke loose, from what I was told. Our roadies (big buggers to a man) wrestled with the young band to get them off our equipment and off the stage. Chaos and frolics ensued". Angus Young relates that there were incidents both before and after Deep Purple played. Jim Keays performed his solo concept album The Boy from the Stars. Keays and his band were reportedly the only act to have been paid for their appearance, having arranged an outside sponsorship. Later in the year, Deep Purple planned a tour for 1976 and after the Australian Musicians Union "made it clear ... that the proposed tour of Deep Purple could lead to considerable unrest" the UK band placed money into a fund so that artists appearing at Sunbury '75 were paid the full musician's rate.

Band line-up

Although slated to appear, AC/DC did not perform.

- AC/DC
- Ariel
- Ayers Rock
- Billy Thorpe & the Aztecs
- Buster Brown
- The Captain Matchbox Whoopee Band
- Chain
- Daddy Cool
- Deep Purple
- Jim Keays
- Kush
- The La De Da's
- Linda George
- Matt Taylor
- Skyhooks
- Renée Geyer and Sanctuary
- The Keystone Angels
- Madder Lake
- Ross Ryan
- Solid Rock Big Band
- Sherbet
- Skylight
- Foreday Riders

Girl group The Cookies sang as backing singers for various artists including Kush and Linda George (they sang at three of the four festivals).

== Popular culture references ==
The Fauves in 1998 released a song called "Sunbury 97" on their album, Lazy Highways. The lyrics include: There's the tree where mum & dad conceived me / Do you believe that I'm a child of Sunbury '73?. Chris Wilson recorded the track "Sunbury '73" on his 1998 release, The Long Weekend, that reminisces about a road trip south from Sydney to attend the concert.

The television sitcom, All Together Now (1991-1993) features Jon English playing an ageing rocker trying to maintain a music career after his glory days as one of the performers at Sunbury.

Australia Post issued a 50c stamp featuring the poster artwork of the 1972 festival as part of their series, Australian Rock Posters.

Excerpts from Dixon's 1972 film Sunbury have been featured in many Australian TV specials and series including the Australian Broadcasting Corporation's Long Way to the Top in 2001.

In 1993, festival organiser, John Fowler donated his collection of Sunbury memorabilia to the Performing Arts Museum of the Victoria Arts Centre.

At the Music Victoria Awards of 2015, the Sunbury Pop Festival was inducted into the Hall of Fame.

== See also ==
- List of historic rock festivals
- List of music festivals
