= List of Festival Mushroom Records artists =

This is a list of artists who recorded for Festival Mushroom Records.

During their existence, Festival Mushroom had also distributed for several independent Australian labels and international licensors, many of which will be noted. Many of these artists are now either signed to or distributed by Warner Music Australia.

An asterisk (*) denotes an artist who was signed or licensed to Festival Records prior to the merger of Festival and Mushroom. A caret (+) denotes an artist who was signed or licensed to Mushroom Records prior to the merger. A slash (/) denotes an artist who was signed to both labels at one point prior to the merger.

== Official artists ==
- 67 Special
- Amiel
- Archie Roach+
- The Badloves+
- Billy Bragg+
- Billy Thorpe/ (first signed to Festival through Infinity Records and Interfusion)
- Carly Binding
- Chain/ (first signed through Infinity)
- Christine Anu+
- Daniel Merriweather
- Deadstar+
- Deborah Conway+
- Deni Hines+
- Echobrain
- Eddi Reader
- Fiona McDonald+
- The Gadflys* (signed through Larrikin Records)
- George
- Gerling*
- Greg Churchill
- Gyroscope
- Henry Rollins*
- Hunters & Collectors+
- Jade Hurley*
- Jimmy Barnes+
- Jimmy Christo+
- Jimmy Little*
- Josh Abrahams
- Judith Durham/ (signed through Interfusion, then to Mushroom)
- Kate Ceberano/
- King Kapisi*
- Kylie Minogue+
- LCD
- Leonardo's Bride+
- Margret RoadKnight* (signed through Infinity)
- Mark Seymour+
- The Mavis's+ (signed through White Records)
- Michael Spiby+
- Mick Hart+
- Not From There+
- Olivia Newton-John*
- Paul Kelly+
- Peter Andre+
- Pound System+
- Quench
- Rollins Band
- Ruby Hunter+
- Rumanastone+
- Scandal'us
- The Seekers+
- Skyhooks+
- Sola Rosa
- Sparks
- Splendid+
- Sprung Monkey
- Status Quo
- TISM
- Vika and Linda+
- Wicked Beat Sound System+
- Yothu Yindi+

== Licensed artists ==
- (Smog) (licensed from Spunk)
- 28 Days (licensed from Sputnik)
- 5000 Fingers of Dr. T (licensed from Clan Analogue)
- Aaron Tippin (licensed from Lyric Street)
- Adam Brand (licensed from Compass Brothers)
- Afrika Bambaataa (licensed from Tommy Boy)
- Arab Strap (licensed from Spunk)
- Arling & Cameron (licensed from PIAS)
- Art Blakey (licensed from Fantasy)
- Art Pepper (licensed from Fantasy)
- Arthur Baker (licensed from Perfecto)
- Ash (licensed from Infectious)
- ATFC (licensed from Defected)
- Babybird (licensed from Echo)
- Baha Men (licensed from S-Curve)
- Belle and Sebastian (licensed from Spunk)
- Ben Webster (licensed from Fantasy)
- Benny Carter (licensed from Fantasy)
- Betchadupa (licensed from Sputnik)
- Bill Evans Trio (licensed from Fantasy)
- Bobby Timmons (licensed from Fantasy)
- Boiler Room (licensed from Tommy Boy)
- Bonnie "Prince" Billy (licensed from Spunk)
- Brendon Walmsley (licensed from Compass Brothers)
- BT (licensed from Embrace the Future)
- Built to Spill (licensed from Spunk)
- Butthole Surfers (licensed from Hollywood)
- Cannonball Adderley (licensed from Fantasy)
- Charles Mingus (licensed from Fantasy)
- Charlie Byrd (licensed from Fantasy)
- Charlie Parker (licensed from Fantasy)
- Chet Baker (licensed from Fantasy)
- Clifford Brown (licensed from Fantasy)
- Coleman Hawkins (licensed from Fantasy)
- Coolio (licensed from Tommy Boy)
- Count Basie (licensed from Fantasy)
- Cousteau (licensed from Palm Pictures)
- Creedence Clearwater Revival (licensed from Fantasy)
- The D4 (licensed from Flying Nun)
- De La Soul (licensed from Tommy Boy)
- Deepchild (licensed from Clan Analogue)
- Delerium (licensed from Nettwerk)
- Dexter Gordon (licensed from Fantasy)
- Disco Stu (licensed from Clan Analogue)
- Dizzy Gillespie (licensed from Fantasy)
- Elevator Suite (licensed from Infectious)
- Eric Dolphy (licensed from Fantasy)
- Everlast (licensed from Tommy Boy)
- Fastball (licensed from Hollywood)
- Feeder (licensed from Echo)
- Freestylers (licensed from Freskanova)
- Garageland (licensed from Flying Nun)
- Garbage (licensed from Mushroom UK)
- Gob (licensed from Nettwerk)
- Goo Goo Dolls (licensed from Hollywood)
- Guided by Voices (licensed from TVT)
- The Hasselhoff Experiment (licensed from Flying Nun)
- High Dependency Unit (licensed from Flying Nun)
- Invertigo (licensed from Standard)
- Jacknife Lee (licensed from Palm Pictures)
- Jan Johnston (licensed from Perfecto)
- Jean Jacques Smoothie (licensed from Echo)
- Jeb Loy Nichols (licensed from Rykodisc)
- Jim O'Rourke (licensed from Spunk)
- Joe Henry (licensed from Hollywood)
- Joe Pernice (licensed from Spunk)
- The Kingsbury Manx (licensed from Spunk)
- Lambchop (licensed from Spunk)
- Lash (licensed from Sputnik)
- Lazaro's Dog (licensed from Rapido)
- Looper (licensed from Spunk)
- Loudon Wainwright III (licensed from Rykodisc)
- Machine Gun Fellatio (licensed from Sputnik)
- Machine Translations (licensed from Spunk)
- Mark Eitzel (licensed from Spunk)
- Masters at Work (licensed from Tommy Boy)
- Melinda Schneider (licensed from Compass Brothers)
- Mocean Worker (licensed from Palm Pictures)
- Mogwai (licensed from Spunk)
- Moloko (licensed from Echo)
- Motor Ace (licensed from Sputnik)
- Muse (licensed from Mushroom UK)
- My Vitriol (licensed from Infectious)
- Myra (licensed from Buena Vista)
- Nokturnl (licensed from Sputnik)
- One Dollar Short (licensed from Rapido)
- Paul Oakenfold (licensed from Perfecto)
- Pernice Brothers (licensed from Spunk)
- Rascal Flatts (licensed from Lyric Street)
- Red Rivers (licensed from Compass Brothers)
- Richard Buckner (licensed from Spunk)
- Robert Cray (licensed from Rykodisc)
- Seven Mary Three (licensed from Mammoth)
- SHeDAISY (licensed from Lyric Street)
- The Shins (licensed from Spunk)
- Sigur Rós (licensed from PIAS)
- Sister2Sister (licensed from Standard)
- Sixpence None the Richer (licensed from Squint)
- Sleater-Kinney (licensed from Spunk)
- Sonic Animation (licensed from Sputnik)
- Soulwax (licensed from PIAS)
- Squirrel Nut Zippers (licensed from Mammoth)
- Stephen Malkmus (licensed from Spunk)
- Supreme Beings of Leisure (licensed from Palm Pictures)
- Taj Mahal (licensed from Rykodisc)
- Teddybears (licensed from Rapido)
- Thelonious Monk (licensed from Fantasy)
- Timo Maas (licensed from Perfecto)
- Tom Jones (licensed from Gut)
- Tom Tom Club (licensed from Rykodisc)
- Tortoise (licensed from Spunk)
- Trans Am (licensed from Spunk)
- Tricky (licensed from Hollywood)
- Turnstyle (licensed from Spunk)
- Unwritten Law (licensed from Rapido)
- Utah Saints (licensed from Echo)
- VAST (licensed from Mushroom UK)
- Wheat (licensed from Spunk)
- Wookie (licensed from PIAS)
- Zero 7 (licensed from Mushroom UK)

== Television DVDs ==
- Wheel of Fortune (Australian game show) (1981–present)
- Thomas & Friends (1984–1986)
- Kath & Kim (2002–2004, 2007)
- Emma & Ali's Catch Phrase (2007)
- The Support Unit 2005 (2005)
- Leigh & Brad's Story (2005)
- Home and Away – Holiday Coast (1990–present)

== See also ==
- Festival Records
- Mushroom Records
- Warner Music Australia
