= Foreday Riders =

Australian blues band

The Foreday Riders are a blues band. The band was formed in 1967, and they were influenced by The Rolling Stones, Manfred Mann, and The Yardbirds.
