= Madder Lake =

Australian band

- Also known as: San Sebastian (1968-1971)
- Origin: Melbourne, Victoria, Australia
- Genres: Rock, progressive rock, psychedelic rock
- Years active: 1968–1976, 1978–1979, 1982, 1996–present
- Labels: Mushroom, Aztec
- Members: Luke McKinnon; Brenden Mason; Kerry McKenna; Andy Burns; John McKinnon; Michael O'Loughlin
- Past members: Mick Fettes; Andy Cowan; Colin Setches; Tony Lake; Ian Holding; Jacobus Kreemers (deceased 2020); Ian Ferguson
- Website: Official website

Madder Lake are an Australian progressive rock band formed in Melbourne in 1968 as San Sebastian. They were one of the first bands signed to the Michael Gudinski co-owned Mushroom Records which released their debut single, "Goodbye Lollypop" in February 1973, followed by the album Stillpoint in August. This contained their most recognisable single, "12lb Toothbrush". Their second album Butterfly Farm was released in April 1974, they left Mushroom after their last single, "I Get High" appeared in July 1976. A compilation album The Best of Madder Lake was released by Mushroom Records in 1978.

== History ==
=== 1968-1976: The peak years ===
San Sebastian were a part-time rock band formed by Swinburne Institute of Technology (now Swinburne University of Technology, Hawthorn campus) Graphic Design students in 1968, including Kerry McKenna on bass guitar and Brenden Mason on guitar. By 1969 the line-up was McKenna, Mason, Mick Fettes on vocals, Jac Kreemers on drums and John McKinnon on keyboards, they were playing cover versions for the pub circuit. Original material was introduced and, by late 1970, band members were leaving their tertiary studies to fulfil their bookings. With a repertoire of progressive, psychedelic, blues music they changed their name, in early 1971, to Madder Lake—madder lake is a crimson-coloured water-based dye (alizarin) mixed with alum and used in painting.

The Melbourne-based line-up of Fettes, Kreemers, Mason, McKenna and McKinnon were picked up by Michael Gudinski's booking agency, Consolidated Rock. Madder Lake were influenced by British progressive rock acts, Family, Traffic and King Crimson. They were the opening act at the inaugural Sunbury Pop Festival in January 1972. As their popularity increased, they were one of the first bands signed to the Gudinski co-owned Mushroom Records in late 1972. By 1973 they were a headlining act at the 1973 Sunbury Pop Festival and Mushroom Records' first release was their debut single, "Goodbye Lollipop", in February. The single peaked at No. 15 in Melbourne and made the Australian singles Top 40. Mushroom Records' first album release was the ambitious triple-live, The Great Australian Rock Festival - Sunbury 1973, which was released in early April, and included two Madder Lake tracks. Madder Lake's debut album, Stillpoint followed in August, which peaked at No. 13 on the Australian albums chart, it spawned their most recognised single, "12lb Toothbrush", written by band members Fettes, Kreemers, McKenna and McKinnon. McKinnon had been replaced on keyboards by Andy Cowan by the time the album and its related single had been released.

In 1974, the band recorded their second album, Butterfly Farm which was released in April, but the album and its related singles had less critical and commercial success than earlier work. British conductor, David Measham, who had worked with Rick Wakeman on his Journey to the Centre of the Earth, was based in Perth, Western Australia from 1974. He commissioned Madder Lake for a theme piece on Aldous Huxley's science fiction novel Brave New World, but the project stalled when funding from Australian Broadcasting Corporation (ABC) was cut back and Measham's other commitments intruded. Cowan and Fettes left Madder Lake by late 1975, Fettes formed Bandicoot with comedian, Shane Bourne. Fettes was initially replaced by Colin Setches on vocals but when McKinnon returned in early 1976 he took up vocals in addition to keyboards, meanwhile Ian Holding replaced a departing McKenna on bass guitar and the band recorded their last single, "I Get High" and left Mushroom Records. McKenna returned, now on second guitar, and Tony Lake joined on vocals but soon left. Although not formally disbanding, Madder Lake subsequently had numerous periods of low activity.

=== 1977-2012: Break up and occasional performances ===
Fettes returned in April 1978 for touring and Mushroom released their compilation album, The Best of Madder Lake in May, a new album was planned but Fettes left again in January 1979.

Madder Lake resurfaced with three tracks on Mushroom Evolution Concert live album, to celebrate the record company's tenth anniversary in 1982.

They returned to touring in 1996 and appeared on Mushroom 25 Live: The Concert of the Century released in 1998, after which Gudinski sold his interests in Mushroom to Festival Records. Madder Lake's two studio albums have been re-issued by Aztec Music with bonus tracks added, Stillpoint on 10 October 2008 and Butterfly Farm on 24 March 2009. As of May 2009, Madder Lake are Andy Burns on keyboards, Fettes, Kreemers, Mason and McKenna. The band headlined the Queenscliff Music Festival in November 2008.

=== 2013-present: World ===
In 2013 the band released World, their first album in 39 years and one of the longest gaps between studio albums. In October 2011, Mick Fettes retired from performing. He was replaced by Ian Ferguson in 2013 to help promote their World album. Ian has a long history with bands from the sixties, which included The Moods, Y?4, Running Jumping Standing Still, Carson County Band/Carson, Mick Elliott Band, Carson Taylor Band, Ford and the Ferg and Blue Dukes. After two years, with only two charity gigs and one commercial performance, and the lack of enthusiasm of the band to promote the album, Ian left to pursue other interests.

Mick Fettes died on 18 November 2016, at the age of 65.

== Personnel ==
- Mick Fettes — lead vocals
- Jac Kreemers — drums, backing vocals, percussion
- Brenden Mason — guitar
- Kerry McKenna — bass, backing and lead vocals, synthesizers
- John McKinnon — keyboards, backing vocals
- Andy Cowan — keyboards, backing and lead vocals
- Ian Holding — bass guitar
- Tony Lake — vocals
- Colin Setches — vocals
- Luke McKinnon — drums
- Andy Burns — keyboards
- Ian Ferguson — vocals

== Discography ==
=== Studio albums ===
List of albums, with Australian chart positions
Title	Album details	Peak chart positions
Title	Album details	AUS
Stillpoint	Released: March 1973; Format: LP; Label: Mushroom Records (MRL 34915)	13
Butterfly Farm	Released: April 1974; Format: LP, Cassette; Label: Mushroom Records (L 35090)	22
World	Released: 2013; Format: CD, Digital download; Label: Madder Lake	-

=== Compilations albums ===
List of albums
Title	Album details
The Best of Madder Lake	Released: May 1978; Format: LP; Label: Mushroom Records (L 36585)
The Live Adventures Of Madder Lake 1973-2008	Released: June 2020; Format: 2xCD, DD, Label: Aztec Records (AVSCD085); Compilation of live tracks

=== Singles ===
List of singles, with Australian chart positions
Year	Title	Peak chart positions	Album
Year	Title	AUS	Album
1973	"Goodbye Lollipop"	31	Stillpoint
1973	"12-LB. Toothbrush"	35	Stillpoint
1974	"Butterfly Farm"	-	Butterfly Farm
1974	"Booze Blues"	85	Butterfly Farm
1974	"It's All In Your Head"	-	—N/a
1975	"I Get High"	-	—N/a
