= Kush (Australian band) =

- Origin: Melbourne, Australia
- Genres: Jazz rock
- Years active: 1971–1975, 1977
- Labels: Warner Bros., RCA Victor

Kush were an Australian jazz rock fusion band, which formed in 1971. They were led by Geoff Dufff p.k.a. Jeff Duff on lead vocals. Kush released two studio albums, Presents Snow White... and the Eight Straights (1974), which peaked at No. 24 on the Australian albums chart, and Nah, Tellus Wh't Kush Means Yer Great Sausage (1975), before disbanding later that year. Duff undertook a solo career both in Australia and, as Duffo, in Europe.

== History ==
Kush were formed in 1971 in Melbourne as a jazz-rock fusion band by Ron Anderson on piano, flute and saxophone, Stephen Ball on keyboards, Colin Chapman on trumpet and flugelhorn, Geoff Duff p.k.a. Jeff Duff on lead vocals, John Ellis on clarinet, flute and saxophone, John Hughes on trumpet and trombone, Rob Matthews on bass guitar, Graham McDonald on drums and Roger Pell on guitar. Australian musicologist Ian McFarlane described their performance style, "[they] mixed appealing Blood Sweat and Tears/Chicago-styled jazz-rock with outrageous and bizarre stage antics." Those antics were largely devised by Duff, who developed various personae. McFarlane described him as "waif-like, fish-net-stocking-clad Duff would assume the role of Beelzebub himself while ripping up the Bible!"

Soon after formation Anderson was replaced by Ian Mason and Pell by Dave Herzog. Pell joined Pantha. Kush were signed with Warner Bros. in 1973. They issued their debut single, "Peter Gunn", in July, which is a cover version of Henri Mancini's 1959 original. It reached the Australian Kent Music Report singles chart top 50. Their second single, "Wait" (November), was an original written by Duff and Herzog, but it did not reach the top 100.

Kush started recording their debut album, Presents Snow White... and the Eight Straights (September 1974) early in that year with the line-up of Duff, Ellis, Herzog and Matthews joined by Steve Ball, Bill Harrower (ex-Levi Smith's Clefs) on tenor saxophone and flute, Ian Hellings (ex-Nova Express) on trumpet, Nick Lister on drums, John Santos (a.k.a. Montesante) on trumpet. It peaked at No. 24 on the Kent Music Report albums chart. Their third single, "(Livin' on) Easy Street" (October), was written by Ball, which reached the top 50. Late that year Matthews left and was replaced on bass guitar by Clive Harrison and Ellis left.

Kush released a cover of "MacArthur Park" (1975), which McFarlane praised as "the best rendition ever recorded (check it out) even outstripping [Harris]' original 1968 hit." An album track, "Walk on the Wild Side", which is a cover of Lou Reed's 1972 single, became Duff's signature song.

Early in 1975 the Kush line-up of Duff, Ball, Harrison, Herzog, Lister and Arthur Robinson on saxophone, flute, clarinet and violin, recorded their second album, Nah, Tellus Wh't Kush Means Yer Great Sausage (June 1975). It did not chart and the group broke up in July 1975. Duff began his solo career but in March 1977 he briefly reformed Kush with Anderson, Ellis and Santos joined by Bob Bickerton on drums, Gary Costello on bass guitar, Ted Joyner on trumpet, Dave Sterry on guitar and Peter Sullivan on keyboards. They promoted Duff's solo single, "Temptation's 'Bout to Get Me", before disbanding later that year. Duff, as Duffo, relocated to England in 1978 and continued his solo career.

== Members ==
- Ron Anderson – piano, flute, saxophone
- Colin Chapman – trumpet, flugelhorn
- Geoff Dufff p.k.a. Jeff Duff – lead vocals, percussion
- John Ellis – clarinet, flute, saxophone
- John Hughes – trumpet, trombone
- Rob Matthews – bass guitar
- Graham McDonald – drums
- Roger Pell – guitar
- Dave Herzog – guitar
- Ian Mason – keyboards
- Stephen Ball – keyboards
- Bill Harrower – tenor saxophone, flute
- Ian Hellings – trumpet
- Nick Lister – drums
- John Santos (a.k.a. Montesante) – trumpet
- Clive Harrison – bass guitar
- Arthur Robinson – saxophone, flute, clarinet, violin
- Bob Bickerton – drums
- Gary Costello – bass guitar
- Ted Joyner – trumpet
- Dave Sterry – guitar
- Peter Sullivan – keyboards

== Discography ==
=== Studio albums ===
List of albums, with Australian chart positions
Title	Album details	Peak chart positions
Title	Album details	AUS
Presents Snow White... And the Eight Straights	Released: September 1974; Format: LP; Label: Warner Bros. (600,007)	24
Nah, Tellus Wh't Kush Means Yer Great Sausage	Released: 1975; Format: LP; Label: RCA Victor (VPL1-0071)	-

=== Singles ===
List of singles, with selected chart positions
Year	Title	Peak chart positions	Album
Year	Title	AUS	Album
1973	"Peter Gunn"	43	non album single
1973	"Wait"	-	Presents Snow White... And the Eight Straights
1974	"Easy Street"	48	Presents Snow White... And the Eight Straights
1975	"Macarthur Park"	-	Presents Snow White... And the Eight Straights
1975	"I'm Your Football"	-	Nah, Tellus Wh't Kush Means Yer Great Sausage
1975	"Banana Song" (by Geoff Duff and Kush)	-	non album single
