= Black Alice (band) =

- Also known as: Gypsy
- Origin: Perth
- Genre: Metal
- Years active: 1982-1984,1988

Black Alice was an Australian metal band formed by Rob Hartley (vocals), Jamie Page (guitar), Vince Linardi (bass) and Joe Demasi (drums). They released the album Endangered Species in 1983 in the UK and then in 1984 in Australia.

In 1988 singer Hartley appeared in the film Sons of Steel as the character Black Alice and the band reformed to record the soundtrack with Andy Cichon (bass), Scott Johnson (drums) and Paul Radcliffe (keyboards, guitar) joining Hartley and Page.

== Discography ==
- Endangered Species (1983)
- Sons of Steel (1988)
