= Sid Rumpo =

Australian musical group

- Origin: Perth, Western Australia, Australia
- Genres: R&B, blues rock
- Years active: 1971–1974
- Labels: Mushroom, Festival
- Past members: John Hood; Noel Herridge; Owen Hughes; Robert Searls; Ken Wallace; Mick Elliott

Sid Rumpo were an Australian R&B group which formed in Perth in November 1971. They issued their debut album, First Offense, in April 1974 on Mushroom Records/Festival Records but disbanded by the end of that year. The band were formed by John Hood on lead guitar and harmonica (ex-Jelly Roll Bakers, Juke); Noel Herridge on drums (Adderley Smith Blues Band); Owen Hughes on bass guitar (Jelly Roll Bakers); Robert Searls on lead guitar and vocals; and Ken Wallace on piano. In 1972 they won the Western Australian state final in the Hoadley's Battle of the Sounds. They appeared at both the 1973 and 1974 Sunbury Pop Festivals. According to Australian musicologist, Ian McFarlane, "[o]ne of the unique features of the band's sound was the use of dual, harmony guitar lines which had the effect of enhancing the natural spaciousness of the music. To top it off, Searls was one of the great gravel-throated blues wailers of the day".

== History ==
In November 1971 Sid Rumpo were formed in Perth by ex-Jelly Roll Bakers members John Hood on lead guitar and harmonica; and Owen Edward Hughes on bass guitar. They were joined by Noel John Herridge on drums from Adderley Smith Blues Band; Robert James Searls on lead guitar and lead vocals; and Kenneth James "Ken" Wallace on piano. In September 1972 they won the state final of the Hoadley's Battle of the Sounds; then they relocated to Melbourne a month later.

In January 1973 Sid Rumpo performed at the second Sunbury Pop Festival, with their track, "Sailing", appearing on Mushroom Records triple live album of the event, The Great Australian Rock Festival Sunbury 1973, in April. The track was co-written by Hood, Herridge, Hughes, Searls and Wallace. Soon after they signed with Mushroom Records. In May they appeared on ABC-TV music series, GTK, to showcase their track, "Don't Bug Me Boogie". Mushroom issued a Various Artists album, Garrison: The Final Blow Unit 2, which included Sid Rumpo's live rendition of "Now I'm Free", recorded at The Garrison in Prahran.

Hood was replaced on lead guitar by Michael John "Mick" Elliott (ex-Moppa Blues, Sunshine, Tank, Sayla) in August 1973 when he left to return to Perth. The band performed at the third Sunbury Pop Festival in January the following year, two of their tracks were cover versions of Willie Dixon's "Wang Dang Doodle" and Robert Johnson's "Sweet Home Chicago". Both tracks appeared on the Various Artists live album, Highlights of Sunbury '74 Part 2, late that year on Mushroom Records.

In February 1974 the group recorded their debut album, First Offense, at T.C.S. Studios in Melbourne; it was released in April by Mushroom and distributed by Festival Records. Australian musicologist, Ian McFarlane, noted that it was "a strong album, mixing hard blues tracks like 'Spotlight' and 'Breaking My Back' with lengthy, progressive rock outings like 'Sailing' and 'Song with no Trees'". They also issued their debut single, "The Riddle", in that month.

== Members ==
- John Hood – lead guitar, vocals, harmonica (1971–1973)
- Noel Herridge – drums (1971–1974)
- Owen Hughes – bass guitar (1971–1974)
- Robert Searls – guitar, lead vocals (1971–1974)
- Ken Wallace – piano (1971–1974)
- Mick Elliott – lead guitar (1973–1974)

== Discography ==
=== Studio albums ===
List of albums, with selected details and chart positions
Title	Album details	Peak chart positions
Title	Album details	AUS
First Offense	Released: April 1974; Format: LP; Label: Mushroom (L 35109)	33

=== Singles ===
List of singles
Title	Year
"Jump Down Step Aside"	1974
"The Riddle"	1974
