= MacKenzie Theory =

Australian jazz rock group

- Origin: Melbourne, Victoria, Australia
- Genres: Jazz rock, acid rock
- Years active: 1971–1974
- Label: Mushroom
- Past members: Mike Leadabrand; Rob MacKenzie; Andrew Majewski; Cleis Pearce; Peter Jones; Greg Sheehan; Paul "Sheepdog" Wheeler

MacKenzie Theory were an Australian jazz rock group formed in September 1971. Rob MacKenzie (lead guitar) and Cleis Pearce (electric viola) were the mainstays. They recorded two albums, Out of the Blue (1973) and Bon Voyage (1974) for Mushroom before disbanding in May 1974. MacKenzie wrote their original tracks and produced their material. Out of the Blue peaked at No. 19 on Go-Set's Australian Albums chart. In the 1990s, MacKenzie was a member of United States rock'n'roll revival act, Sha Na Na.

== History ==
MacKenzie Theory were formed in Melbourne in September 1971 by lead guitarist, Rob MacKenzie, with bass guitarist Mike Leadabrand and drummer Andrew Majewski. At that time, MacKenzie also met electric viola player Cleis Pearce at a concert in Sydney, while he was filling in with another group. He was so impressed with her playing that he immediately invited her to join, even though she had no previous experience of playing rock or improvised music. Previously, MacKenzie had been a member of Leo and Friends and King Harvest.

MacKenzie Theory played instrumental jazz rock with elements of John Coltrane, King Crimson, Mahavishnu Orchestra and Santana. At early gigs they supported other artists including, Band of Light, Billy Thorpe & the Aztecs, Chain, Madder Lake or Spectrum.

The band performed at the inaugural Sunbury Pop Festival in January 1972 and at the second festival in January 1973. Their track, "New Song And", was included on the triple live album, The Great Australian Rock Festival Sunbury 1973, which appeared on Mushroom Records in April. Their debut album, Out of the Blue, recorded live in the studio, was issued in July, and it peaked at No. 19 on Go-Set's Australian Albums chart in August. During September, Leadabrand and Majewski left and were replaced by Paul Wheeler (ex-Billy Thorpe & the Aztecs) on bass guitar and Greg Sheehan (ex-Blackfeather) on drums. Pianist, Peter Jones also joined.

MacKenzie Theory appeared at Sunbury again in 1974 and "Supreme Love" appeared on Highlights of Sunbury '74 Part 2. They disbanded by mid-year before MacKenzie and Pearce travelled to the United Kingdom. Their final appearance on 15 May at Dallas Brooks Hall, East Melbourne was recorded and released by Mushroom Records as a live album, Bon Voyage. In October of that year, Tony Catterall of The Canberra Times praised that album and lamented the band's break-up. He compared them favourably with American groups, the Flock and Grateful Dead. Catterall felt, "Bon Voyage is in keeping with the times, freer and less intense than that of those two groups. Both Flock and The Dead had music that bored into your skull and really messed thing up. Theory's music, while being just as spacey does not produce that feeling of oppressiveness and evil the other two could generate. The album was reportedly released against the wishes of MacKenzie, who felt that the performance captured on the album was below par for the group.

MacKenzie had been awarded a travel grant in 1974 from Australia Council for the Arts to study guitar in Europe. He relocated to Los Angeles in the 1980s, where he worked as a session and auxiliary musician. During the 1990s, MacKenzie was a member of United States rock'n'roll revival act, Sha Na Na. In December 2009, Aztec Music issued a remastered version of Out of the Blue on CD. MacKenzie returned to live in Australia in 2014. The label issued Bon Voyage on CD in 2019.

In the 1980s, Pearce performed and recorded with the Sydney-based jazz ensemble Women & Children First, led by saxophonist Sandy Evans. She was a visiting artist at Southern Cross University in 1998 for their Women in Contemporary Music Program. Pearce lived in Byron Bay, where she composed, taught and made art.

== Members ==
- Mike Leadabrand – bass guitar (1971–1973)
- Rob MacKenzie – guitar (1971–1974)
- Andrew Majewski – drums (1971–1973)
- Cleis Pearce – electric viola (1971–1974)
- Peter Jones – piano (1973–1974)
- Greg Sheehan – drums (1973–1974)
- Paul "Sheepdog" Wheeler – bass guitar (1973–1974)

== Discography ==
=== Albums ===
List of albums, with Australian chart positions
| Title | Album details | Peak chart positions |
| Title | Album details | AUS |
|---|---|---|
| Out of the Blue | Released: July 1973; Format: LP; Label: Mushroom (MRL 34925) | 24 |
| Bon Voyage | Released: 1974; Format: LP (live); Label: Mushroom (MRL 35276) | - |
