= Carson (band) =

- Also known as: Carson County Band
- Origin: Melbourne, Victoria, Australia
- Genres: Blues rock, boogie rock
- Years active: 1970–1973
- Labels: Rebel, Havoc, EMI, Harvest
- Past members: John Capek; Ian Ferguson; Greg Lawrie; Tony Lunt; Tony Enery; Paul Lever; Ian Winter; Broderick Smith; Barry Sullivan; Gary Clarke; Mal Logan; Mal Capewell

Carson were an Australian blues rock and boogie rock band, which formed in January 1970 as Carson County Band. As Carson, their classic lineup was Gary Clarke on bass guitar, Greg Lawrie on slide guitar and dobro, Mal Logan on keyboards, Tony Lunt on drums, Broderick Smith on vocals and harmonica and Ian Winter on guitar. They had a top 30 hit single on the Go-Set National Top 40 with "Boogie" in September 1972. The group released their debut studio album, Blown, in November on EMI/Harvest, which peaked at No. 14 on the Go-Set Top 20 Albums. Their performance at the second Sunbury Pop Festival in late January 1973 was issued as a live album, On the Air, in April, but the group had already disbanded.

Founding pianist and vocalist, John Capek had left by mid-1970 and relocated to North America by 1973 where he worked as a composer (often with Marc Jordan), record producer and keyboardist both in Toronto, Canada and in Los Angeles, United States. After Carson disbanded, Smith formed the country rock band the Dingoes in 1973 and also had a successful solo career. Broderick Smith died in 2023, aged 75.

== History ==
Carson formed in Melbourne in January 1970 as the Carson County Band and, influenced by United States group Canned Heat, they performed blues rock and boogie rock. Founders of Carson County Band were John Capek on piano and vocals, Ian Ferguson on bass guitar and vocals, Greg "Sleepy" Lawrie on slide guitar and dobro (Creatures, Chocolate), Tony Lunt on drums. Other early members were Tony Enery on piano, Paul Lever on guitar, harmonica and vocals, and guest musician, Matt Taylor on guitar, harmonica and vocals. Their debut single, "On the Highway", was issued in May on Rebel Records. Capek left in mid-1970 to join King Harvest and moved to North America in 1973. He worked as a composer (often with Marc Jordan), record producer and keyboardist both in Toronto and in Los Angeles.

In October 1970 Carson dropped the County Band from their name to avoid being confused for a country music group.Ian Winter joined Carson on guitar at the beginning of 1971. Broderick Smith (ex-Adderley Smith Blues Band) joined in mid-year, providing vocals and harmonica. The group released a second single, "Travelling South" in August on Havoc Records, which was written by Lawrie. Ferguson left in July to be replaced successively by Barry Sullivan and then Gary Clarke. Mal Logan on keyboards joined later that year. Carson performed at the first Sunbury Pop Festival in late January 1972. On the Easter weekend, 31 March–2 April 1972, they played two sets at the Mulwala Pop Festival, supporting head-liners Canned Heat and Stephen Stills. Smith spent part of 1972 recording solo material.

Meanwhile, Carson, with Smith returned, issued their next single "Boogie" in September 1972, which reached No. 30 on the Go-Set National Top 40. It was co-written by Lawrie and Smith. This was followed in November by their debut album, Blown on Harvest produced by Rod Coe, which reached No. 14 on Go-Set Top 20 Albums. Michael Foster of The Canberra Times observed, "a Melbourne group of considerable ability and inventiveness, if still needing some more joint experience. I enjoyed [Lawrie]'s bottleneck guitar and found good listening in tracks such as 'Banana Power', 'Sunday in the City' and, nostalgically, 'Boogie'." Australian musicologist, Ian McFarlane, described it as a "powerful" recording, "full of free-flowing, bluesy hard rock".

Carson also performed at the second Sunbury Pop Festival, on the Australia Day long weekend in late January 1973. Ian Winter left soon after and by February, Carson had disbanded. A live recording of their Sunbury set, On the Air was released in April 1973. Smith was a founding member of country rock band, the Dingoes and later had a successful solo career. In 2020 Aztec Records issued an expanded version of On the Air with additional live tracks from performances at Melbourne club Thumpin' Tum in August 1970, Mulwala Rock Festival (April 1972) and at Melbourne's Festival Hall (November 1972). Broderick Smith died in 2023, aged 75.

== Band members ==
Listed chronologically:

- John Capek – piano, vocals, keyboards (1970)
- Ian Ferguson – bass guitar, vocals (1970–1971)
- Greg Lawrie – slide guitar, dobro (1970–1973)
- Tony Lunt – drums (1970–1973)
- Tony Enery – piano (1970)
- Paul Lever – guitar, harmonica, vocals (1970)
- Ian Winter – guitar (1971–1973)
- Broderick Smith – vocals, harmonica (1971–1973)
- Barry Sullivan – bass guitar (1971)
- Gary Clarke – bass guitar (1971–1973)
- Mal Logan – keyboards (1971–1973)
- Mal Capewell – saxophone (1972–1973)

== Discography ==
=== Albums ===
List of albums, with Australian chart positions
Title	Album details	Peak chart positions
Title	Album details	AUS
Blown	Released: November 1972; Format: LP; Label: Harvest Records (SHVL 608)	19
On the Air	Released: April 1973; Format: LP; Label: Harvest Records (SHVL 611); Note Live Album	-
Travelling Highway Blues	Released: 2020; Format: CD, Digital download; Label: Raven Records (RVCD-88); Note Greatest Hits album	-

=== Singles ===
List of singles, with selected chart positions
Year	Title	Peak chart positions	Album
Year	Title	AUS	Album
1970	"On the Highway"	-	non album single
1971	"Travelling South"	-	non album single
1972	"Boogie"	29	Blown
