= Mushroom Records =

Australian record label

- Parent company: Mushroom Group (1972–1998); Festival Mushroom Records (1998–2005); Warner Bros. Records (2005–2010)
- Founded: 1972
- Founder: Michael Gudinski; Ray Evans
- Defunct: 2009
- Distributors: Mushroom Distribution Services; Warner Bros. Records; Rhino Entertainment (re-issues only)
- Genre: Pop, rock
- Country of origin: Australia
- Location: Melbourne
- Official website: www.wmg.com

Mushroom Records was an Australian flagship record label, founded in 1972 in Melbourne. It published and distributed many successful Australian artists and expanded internationally, until it was merged with Festival Records in 1998. Festival Mushroom Records was later acquired by Warner Bros. Records, which operated the label from 2005 to 2010 before merging the label's catalogue with its own. Founder Michael Gudinski went on to become the leader of the Mushroom Group, the largest independent music and entertainment company in Australia, with divisions such as Frontier Touring.

== History ==
Mushroom Records was an Australian record label formed by Michael Gudinski and Ray Evans in Melbourne in 1972.

Its inaugural release was an ambitious triple live album of the 1973 Sunbury Pop Festival, and over the first few years of its existence Mushroom signed a number of important Australian acts including Madder Lake, Ayers Rock, and MacKenzie Theory. In December 1974, Gudinski flew to the US to promote his recording artists, with Ayers Rock securing a recording contract, and an advance from A&M Records. Ayers Rock were the first Mushroom artist to sign an international recording contract. Mushroom struggled to survive for its first two years and reportedly came close to folding on several occasions. However, the label was dramatically pushed to the forefront of the Australian music scene in early 1975 following the massive success of Skyhooks, whose debut album, Living in the 70's, became the biggest-selling Australian LP at that time.

Around the same time, Gudinski was convinced to sign expatriate New Zealand band Split Enz, who had recently relocated to Australia. Although they had only moderate success for the first few years, Split Enz scored huge success in 1980 with the release of their album True Colours and the hit single "I Got You", which marked the emergence of Neil Finn.

In 1978, Gudinski started Suicide, a subsidiary label to Mushroom, to release punk music. Unlike Mushroom, Suicide was distributed by RCA. Its first release was a cover version of "These Boots Are Made For Walking" by The Boys Next Door.

In 1981, Gudinski started another subsidiary, White Label Records, to release what might now be called post-punk music, with signings such as Hunters & Collectors, Machinations, Painters and Dockers, Kids in the Kitchen and The Stems.

In the 1990s, remixer Gavin Campbell's Razor Records became a subsidiary of Mushroom.

Mushroom entered the international scene by setting up an International division in London headed by Gary Ashley (deceased 2017). The Australian label had some international success before then by signing The Saints, Dannii Minogue, Kylie Minogue and Jason Donovan in the eighties. However the last two were released internationally through PWL.

After Gudinski sold 49% of the company to News Corporation in 1993, Garbage signed to the label via Koda Marshall's UK operation, followed by Pop Will Eat Itself, Ash, The Paradise Motel and Peter André.

Gudinski sold the remaining 51% share of the label to News Corporation in 1998 for a sum reported to have been around A$40 million. However, the sale of Australia's last major independent label to a multinational engendered some adverse publicity, with Gudinski controversially claiming that he had sold the label as a protest at the federal government's changes to the regulations governing the parallel importation of recordings.

Gudinski maintained control of most other Mushroom Group companies (including interests in music publishing, film production, band booking, national touring and venue management) and the name Mushroom Records. When Mushroom was merged with News Corporation's record label Festival Records to form Festival Mushroom Records in 1998, Gudinski relaunched Liberation Music.

In October 2005, Festival Mushroom Records was wound up and its trademarks and assets (including its large archive of master recordings) were sold to the Australian division of the Warner Music Group in a deal reported to be worth around A$10 million.

The company's other major asset, Festival Music Publishing, was sold to Gudinski's Mushroom Music a month later for an undisclosed sum.

In December 2009, Gudinski announced that he bought the remaining 50% he did not own from Warner Bros. In 2010, it became fully independent again.

In 2021, Gudinski died in Melbourne at the age of 68.

Throughout 2023, the company celebrated their fiftieth anniversary with a yearlong celebration titled, Mushroom: Fifty Years of Making Noise.

== A&E Records ==
With the reorganisation into Festival Mushroom Records, a number of international operations and joint ventures were either shut down or sold. In the United Kingdom, the British arm of the company (including Infectious and Perfecto Records) was reorganised as A&E Records and sold on to the Warner Music Group when Korda Marshall took a position within that company.

== Mushroom Records artists ==
Below are all the artists that were on the label.

- ABBA (Mushroom/Warner Bros.)
- Christie Allen
- Angry Anderson
- Peter André
- Karen Ansell
- The Angels
- Christine Anu
- Ayers Rock
- Jimmy Barnes
- The Black Sorrows
- Buster Brown
- The Captain Matchbox Whoopee Band
- Kate Ceberano (1991–2000)
- Chain
- Chantoozies
- The Choirboys
- Chosen Few
- The Church
- The Dingoes
- Jason Donovan
- Jenn Forbes
- Frente
- Nelly Furtado (1999–2008)
- Garbage
- George
- Renée Geyer
- Gyroscope
- Home and Away (1988–2004/05)
- Indecent Obsession
- Jacko
- Jo Jo Zep and the Falcons
- Jules
- Paul Kelly
- MacKenzie Theory
- Madder Lake
- The Mavis's
- MEO 245
- Dannii Minogue (1990–1995)
- Kylie Minogue (1987–2008)
- Models
- Mother Goose
- Muse
- Neighbours (1985–2000/01)
- Madonna (2005–2009, Mushroom/Festival/Warner Bros.)
- Mika (2007–2009, Mushroom/Festival/Warner Bros.)
- Katie Noonan
- The Paradise Motel
- Toni Pearen
- Archie Roach
- Lianna Rose
- Rose Tattoo
- The Saints
- Scandal'us
- Sid Rumpo
- Skyhooks
- Split Enz
- The Sports
- The Swingers
- Swoop
- Jo Beth Taylor
- Ted Mulry Gang (1977–1980)
- Billy Thorpe & The Aztecs
- TISM (2001–2002)
- Charlie Thorpe, songwriter
- The Wildhearts
- Yothu Yindi

== See also ==
- Lists of record labels
- Festival Mushroom Records
- List of Festival Mushroom Records artists
  - Festival Records
  - Warner Bros. Records
  - Liberation Records
- A&E Records/Warner Music Group
  - Infectious Records
  - Perfecto Records
  - Taste Media
- Mushroom 25 Live
- Mushroom: Fifty Years of Making Noise
