= Sons of Steel (1989 film) =

- Poster
- Directed by: Gary L. Keady
- Written by: Gary L. Keady
- Produced by: James Michael Vernon
- Starring: Rob Hartley; Roz Wason; Jeff Duff; Dagmar Bláhová
- Cinematography: Joseph Pickering
- Edited by: Amanda Robson
- Music by: Gary L. Keady; Rod Keady; John Vallins
- Release date: 1989
- Running time: 104 minutes
- Country: Australia
- Language: English
- Budget: A$3 million

Sons of Steel is a 1989 Australian sci-fi fantasy musical film written, directed and composed by Gary L. Keady and produced by James M. Vernon.

== Plot ==
The film is set in Australia, where an accidental future time traveler finds himself going back in time to change events to prevent a calamity. It stars Rob Hartley as Black Alice (who performed most of the songs for the movie) and Australian musician Jeff Duff (who sang "The Burn").

== Cast ==
- Rob Hartley as Black Alice
- Roz Wason as Hope
- Jeff Duff as Secta
- Dagmar Bláhová as Honor
- Ralph Cotterill as Karzoff
- Elizabeth Richmond as Djard
- Wayne Snell as Ex
- Mark Hembrow as Mal

== Production ==
The film is based on an original short called "Knightmare", written, co-directed and music directed by Gary L. Keady and co-directed by Yahoo Serious. Gary Keady developed the script for Sons of Steel from the short film, and the feature was shot in 1988. The short film was shown before David Lynch's Dune in theatres, and it received enough notice for major producers to show interest in turning it into a feature. The Age's Buff's choice column describes the short as "a futuristic, post-apocalypse fantasy short which parodies such voguish cultural icons as World Series Cricket, Mad Max and The World According to Russell Mulcahy" noting it uses "fancy editing tricks, spacey music, slow motion, special effects and Mad Max inspired decor."

== Release ==
Sons of Steel premiered at the 1988 Cannes Film Market which was followed by a very limited cinema run in Sydney and Melbourne in 1989 before a video release. It was released in thirty two countries. It won official selection at the Brussels International Festival of Fantastic Film and was a finalist at the Festival of the Imagination, Clermont Ferrand, France in 1989.

== Reception ==
On The Movie Show David Stratton and Margaret Pomeranz both gave it 3 stars with Stratton saying that "the plot's terribly complicated", adding "But despite all the confusion, the film is undeniably gripping." The Canberra Times' Hugh Lamberton says "Sons of Steel is a heavy metal film which revels in its tongue-in-cheek approach to the serious issue of a nuclear holocaust." In Australian film, 1978-1992: a survey of theatrical features Mick Broderick writes "The strengths of Sons of Steel lie in the imaginative, low-budget production design, cinematography and costuming, and (partly) in a convulsive outré performance by Rob Hartley as Black Alice. The film's producers must also be credited for attempting a very rare thing in local cinema production: a rock-and-roll comedy that is science fiction to boot. But for all of the revelry in its comic-book construction, Sons of Steel nevertheless aches to be taken seriously. Here the classic exploitation equation of 'having your cake and eating it too' fails, which only serves to heighten its reactionary subtexts of vengeance, violence and nihilism." When writing about forgotten Australian films the Age's Leigh Paatsch writes "As Australia's most dedicated David Bowie impersonator, second-string pop terrorist Jeff Duff (who enjoyed some minor success in the mid- 1970s) took his careerist homage to its zenith by making a movie every bit as bad as any of the Thin White Duke's. Not so much The Man Who Fell To Earth as The Man Who Couldn't Get Airborne." Peter Malone called it "A bizarre experience, to say the least." On Radio National's MovieTime Jaimie Leonarder describes it as a "futuristic Orwellian despotic Sydney based nightmare over the top camp masterpiece"

== Accolades ==
Nicola Braithwaite, Nicholas Huxley and Gary L. Keady were nominated for Best Costume Design at the 1989 AFI Awards and the film was nominated for best original Australian soundtrack at the ARIA Music Awards of 1990.
