= Jigsaw (Australian band) =

Australian country pop band (1968–1976)

- Origin: Melbourne, Victoria, Australia
- Genres: Country pop
- Years active: 1968–1976
- Label: Fable
- Past members: Ray Eames; Alan "Ollie" Fenton a.k.a. Alan Wright; Ron Gilbee; Dennis Tucker; Eddie Chappell; Jon Calderwood; Barry Roy

Jigsaw were an Australian country pop band, composed of Jon Calderwood on lead guitar, Eddie Chappell on drums, Ron Gilbee on rhythm guitar and Dennis Tucker on bass guitar. Over the course of their career, the band released Australian top ten singles, "Yellow River" (1970) and "How Do You Do" (1972). They also served as the backing band for Australian singer-songwriter Johnny Chester throughout the early 1970s.

== History ==
Jigsaw were formed in May 1968 in Melbourne by Ray Eames on lead guitar (ex-Tony Worsley and the Fabulous Blue Jays, Rockhouse), Alan "Ollie" Fenton on drums (ex-Phantoms, Rockhouse), Ron Gilbee on rhythm guitar and Dennis Tucker on bass guitar (both ex-Merv Benton and the Tamlas, the Rondells/Impala). When the Tamlas disbanded in 1967, band mates Gilbee and Tucker decided to form a Shadows-inspired tribute band. They recruited their friend Eames and his Rockhouse band mate Fenton. The name, Jigsaw, is from a 1967 Shadows album.

After playing Melbourne's pub circuit, in July 1968, Jigsaw joined an Australian Government sponsored tour of South Vietnam to entertain Australian and American troops. Also on that tour were Yvonne Barrett, Pat Carroll, Johnny Chester and compere-comedian Jack Perry. While backing Chester during the Vietnam tour Jigsaw members agreed to work together with the country pop singer upon return to Melbourne. Fenton had previously worked for Chester when he was a member of Phantom, Chester's earlier backing band. Jigsaw also performed and released material on their own, they were signed to Ron Tudor's new label, Fable Records. Fenton died in a work place accident in ca. 1969 and was replaced by Eddie Chappell on drums, while Jon Calderwood took over on lead guitar from Eames soon after.

Jigsaw's debut single for Fable, "To Love Means to Be Free", appeared in May 1970 and reached No. 49 on the Go-Set National Top 60. Also in May the 1970 radio ban, had started as a "pay for play" dispute between major record labels and commercial radio stations. Due to their label's independent status, Fable Records' artists were exempt from the radio ban.

Jigsaw's second single, "Yellow River" (July 1970), was a cover version of United Kingdom band Christie's single from April, which was not played on commercial radio due to the ban. An English singer, Leapy Lee, also issued a cover version, as did Sydney-based group Autumn. After ten weeks on the Go-Set National Top 60, "Yellow River" peaked at No. 1 on 31 October 1970 and was co-credited to all four artists: Jigsaw, Autumn, Christie and Lee. The radio ban had ended the week before.

"Gwen (Congratulations)" (August 1971) by Johnny Chester and Jigsaw, was a cover of American country singer, Tommy Overstreet's single from earlier that year. It peaked at No. 26. Jigsaw's next single, "So I Tell You" (September), was written by Calderwood, but it did not chart. "Shame and Scandal (in the Family)" (December), with Chester, is a cover of Sir Lancelot's 1943 song, which peaked at No. 13.

Jigsaw issued "How Do You Do" as a single in February 1972, which reached No. 11, and is a cover of Dutch duo Mouth & MacNeal's 1971 hit. Their next charting single, "Mademoiselle Ninette" (August), reached No. 20. It is a cover of German group Soulful Dynamics' 1970 single. Another single with Chester, "Midnight Bus", followed in September 1972, their rendition of John D. Loudermilk's 1960 track, which reached No. 25.

Johnny Chester backed by Jigsaw released, "World's Greatest Mum", in June 1973, which peaked at No. 9. In January 1974 Jigsaw and Chester separated, although they periodically supported Chester on tours. Jigsaw's last charting single, "A Rose Has to Die" (June 1974), reached No. 19 on the Kent Music Report singles chart. Their compilation album, Best of Jigsaw, appeared in 1975. They continued performing on the Melbourne pub circuit in the mid-1970s and issued their last single, "Every Day, Every Night", in January 1977. They disbanded shortly after. As for Chester from 1977 he was touring with the Blue Denim Country Band.

== Members ==
Credits:

- Ray Eames – lead guitar
- Alan "Ollie" Fenton a.k.a. Alan Wright – drums
- Ron Gilbee – rhythm guitar
- Dennis Tucker – bass guitar, vocals
- Eddie Chappell – drums, vocals
- Jon Calderwood – lead guitar, vocals, bass guitar, mandolin
- Barry Roy – guitar, vocals, dobro, bass guitar, banjo

== Discography ==
=== Albums ===
Title	Album details
Johnny Chester & Jigsaw (Johnny Chester and Jigsaw)	Released: 1971; Label: Fable (FBSA-013); Formats: LP
Going Places (Just for Fun) (Johnny Chester and Jigsaw)	Released: 1972; Label: Fable (FBSA-025); Formats: LP
Best of Jigsaw	Released: 1975; Label: Fable (FBSA-043); Formats: LP; Compilation album

=== Extended plays ===
Title	EP details
Jigsaw	Released: January 1973; Label: Fable (FBEP-162); Formats: LP

=== Singles ===
Year	Title	Peak chart positions	
Year	Title	AUS Go-Set	AUS KMR
1970	"To Love Means to Be Free"	49	50
1970	"Yellow River"	1	5
1971	"Albert the Albatross"	–	62
1971	"Gwen (Congratulations)" (Johnny Chester and Jigsaw)	26	19
1971	"So I Tell You"	–	–
1971	"Shame and Scandal (in the Family)" (Johnny Chester and Jigsaw)	13	13
1972	"How Do You Do"	11	8
1972	"Readymix Revenge" (Johnny Chester and Jigsaw)	–	37
1972	"Mademoiselle Ninette"	20	18
1972	"Midnight Bus" (Johnny Chester and Jigsaw)	25	31
1973	"Sing Along"	–	–
1973	"Clap Your Hands" / "Marilyn Jones"	–	–
1973	"Sunday Girl"	–	99
1973	"World's Greatest Mum" (Johnny Chester and Jigsaw)	9	8
1974	"She's My Kind of Woman" (Johnny Chester and Jigsaw)	19	14
1974	"A Rose Has to Die"	—N/a	19
1974	"Light up the World"	—N/a	–
1975	"Teach Me How to Rock and Roll"	—N/a	–
1977	"Every Day, Every Night"	—N/a	–
