= Ron Tudor =

Australian producer (1924–2020)

Ron Tudor MBE
- Born: Ronald Stewart Tudor; 18 May 1924; Toora, Victoria, Australia
- Origin: Melbourne, Victoria, Australia
- Died: 21 August 2020 (aged 96) Maldon, Victoria, Australia
- Genres: Pop; rock
- Occupations: Producer; engineer; label owner; record industry executive
- Years active: 1956–1990
- Labels: W&G; Astor; Fable

Ronald Stewart Tudor MBE (18 May 1924 – 21 August 2020) was an Australian music producer, engineer, label owner and record industry executive. He started his career with W&G Records in 1956 as a sales representative; he became their in-house producer and A&R agent before leaving in 1966.

Tudor briefly joined Astor Records as their promotions manager until 1968 when he created his own production company, June Productions. He followed with his own record label, Fable Records, late in 1969 and continued as its CEO until he sold the company in July 1984. In June 1979 Tudor was appointed a Member of the Order of the British Empire, "For service to the recording industry".

At the APRA Music Awards of 1996 he received the Ted Albert Award for Outstanding Services to Australian Music. At the ARIA Music Awards of 1999 he received a Special Achievement Award, which was shared with Bill Armstrong of Armstrong Studios.

== Early life ==
Ronald Stewart Tudor was born on 18 May 1924 in Toora, Victoria, a rural town in a dairy farming district. He was one of ten children. During World War II he enlisted in the Australian Army in February 1943 and was discharged in May 1946 with the rank of gunner.

== Career ==
Tudor became a sales representative for W&G Records in 1956. As the label's A&R and in-house producer he signed and recorded early material for Ernie Sigley, "Love Is a Golden Ring" (1957); Diana Trask, "Going Steady" (1958); and the Seekers, Introducing the Seekers (1963). He recorded an instrumental track, "Wild Weekend" (February 1961), by rock-and-rollers the Thunderbirds after they had been recommended by a local radio DJ, Stan Rofe.

Tudor later recalled, "We had a very good relationship with [Rofe] at 3KZ. He was a wonderful supporter of us and he always said, 'It's about time someone got into local talent'." Australian musicologist Ian McFarlane said that it was "one of the most successful Australian instrumental singles of all-time" alongside the Atlantics' "Bombora". Tudor produced further work by the Thunderbirds and used them to back other artists on their recordings.

Another recommendation from Rofe was Johnny Chester, who had already worked with the Thunderbirds. They provided backing on Chester's debut single, "Hokey Pokey" (May 1961). Tudor continued with W&G until 1966 when he joined rival label Astor Records as a promotions manager. For recordings he used Armstrong Studios founded by Bill Armstrong (manager at W&G Records) in 1965. He continued with that label until 1968 when he started his own company, June Productions.

=== Fable Records ===
Tudor had established an independent record label, Fable Records, in late 1969 with an official launch the following April. During 1969 Tudor had appeared on a TV talent quest, New Faces, as a judge. He signed both the finals winner, John Williamson, and second place getter, Liv Maessen, to Fable. Maessen's second single was a cover version of Mary Hopkin's "Knock, Knock Who's There?" (April 1970), which peaked at No. 2 on the Go-Set National Top 60 Singles Chart in August. Williamson's debut single, "Old Man Emu" (May 1970), peaked at No. 3 in September.

From May to December 1970 the Australian music industry was embroiled in a "pay per play" dispute, 1970 radio ban, which hampered the airplay of both local artists and United Kingdom artists on major labels. Under the ban Hopkins' version of "Knock, Knock Who's There?" was not aired on commercial radio, whereas Maessen's version was. Go-Set's chart compiler, Ed Nimmervoll, acknowledged both artists on their National Top 60, which was given as "Mary Hopkins/Liv Maesson [sic]". Due to the radio ban Fable Records had further chart success with the Mixtures' cover version of "In the Summertime", originally by UK group Mungo Jerry, which reached No. 1 in August for nine weeks.

Melbourne band Jigsaw (Chester's sometime backing band) on Fable Records and Sydney band Autumn on Chart Records both had success with their respective versions of UK group Christie's hit song "Yellow River". "Yellow River" displaced "In the Summertime" at No. 1 in late October. For a short period, the ban had the inadvertent effect of putting more local musicians to air than ever before and also opened the door to the underground artists on previously minor labels such as Fable Records.

In the following year Tudor organised for a studio band, Drummond – essentially members of an Adelaide-formed group, Allison Gros – to record a novelty version of "Daddy Cool" (July 1971), originally by US 1950s group the Rays. According to McFarlane, "[Drummond]'s gimmicky trademark was to utilise chipmunk voices mixed in with normal vocal sounds." It displaced "Eagle Rock" by local band Daddy Cool from the number-one spot in September. "Daddy Cool" held the top spot for eight weeks and stayed in the charts for 22 weeks. In that time Allison Gros had changed their name to Mississippi, while Tudor used the Drummond name for studio musicians, which issued two further singles.

=== Bootleg Records ===
Tudor founded Fable's sub-label, Bootleg Records, in late 1971 in partnership with Brian Cadd – previously a member of the Groop (1964–69) and Axiom (1969–71) – as inhouse producer and A&R agent. Cadd started his solo career and also formed a studio ensemble, the Bootleg Family Band (1972–75), to back his solo and other artists' work via the Bootleg label. Bootleg's first hit was Mississippi's "Kings of the World" (January 1972) which reached No. 10. Cadd's debut solo single, "Ginger Man", appeared in August and peaked at No. 16. In June 1979 Tudor was installed as a Member of the Most Excellent Order of the British Empire with the citation "For service to the recording industry".

Tudor continued with Fable Records into the early 1980s but later described how "his refusal to take part in the Radio Ban led to Fable being 'blackballed' by the major labels and that his business was effectively strangled [due to] its inability to get records distributed". He sold the label to John McDonald in July 1984. In the following October he joined Armstrong Studios, which was renamed as AAV Studios. Tudor retired form the music industry by the late 1980s.

== Publication ==
In September 1988 Tudor wrote an article for The Sound Engineering Magazine detailing Metropolis Audio's Studio Three, "From an acoustic viewpoint, a lot of the possible problems were eliminated with exhaustive acoustic tests during the latter part of studio construction and equipment installation, wiring..."

== Honours, awards and distinctions ==
In June 1979, Tudor was appointed a Member of the Order of the British Empire, "For service to the recording industry". At the APRA Music Awards of 1996 he received the Ted Albert Award for Outstanding Services to Australian Music. In 1999 the Australian Recording Industry Association acknowledged Tudor's and Armstrong's work for Australian music by presenting each with a Special Achievement Award.

== Personal ==
Melbourne Observer's Ash Long reported in June 2017 that, "Ron Tudor, in his 90s, now lives in the country." Since 2015 he was a resident at an aged care facility in Maldon, Victoria. Ronald Stewart Tudor died on 21 August 2020 aged 96.
