= Autumn (Australian band) =

Australian pop music band

- Origin: Sydney, New South Wales, Australia
- Genres: Pop
- Years active: 1969–1972; 1976; 2001
- Labels: Chart; Summit; Warner
- Past members: Glenn Beatson; Rick Graham; Greg Jacques; Steve McMurray; Tony Romeril; Alan Marshall; Charlie Wright; James Caulfield; Dave Hallard; Con Westaberg

Autumn was an Australian pop music band formed in 1969 with Glenn Beatson on drums, Rick Graham on bass guitar, Greg Jacques on organ, Steve McMurray on guitar and Tony Romeril on lead vocals. Their cover version of "Yellow River", released in August 1970, reached No. 1 on the Go-Set National Top 60 along with other versions of the same song recorded by United Kingdom band Christie, fellow Australian band Jigsaw, and English singer Leapy Lee. Autumn had top 40 hits with "Looking Through the Eyes of a Beautiful Girl" (January 1971), "She Works in a Woman's Way" (February) and "Falling" (May). They released two albums, Song to Raymondo and Comes Autumn, both in 1971 before disbanding in the UK early in the following year.

== History ==
Autumn were a pop music band, which formed in Sydney in 1969. Their debut single, "Mr Henry's Lollipop Shoppe", was released early in the following year via EMI/Columbia. They were signed to Chart Records during the 1970 radio ban, which had started in May as a "pay for play" dispute between major record labels and commercial radio stations.

Autumn's second single, "Yellow River" (August 1970), was a cover version of United Kingdom band Christie's single from April, which was not played on commercial radio due to the ban. An English singer, Leapy Lee, also issued a cover version, as did Melbourne-based group Jigsaw. For Autumn's recording the line-up was Glenn Beatson on drums, Rick Graham on bass guitar, Greg Jacques on organ, Steve McMurray on guitar and Tony Romeril on lead vocals. After ten weeks on the Go-Set National Top 60, it peaked at No. 1 on 31 October 1970 and was co-credited to all four artists: Autumn, Jigsaw, Christie and Lee. The radio ban had ended the week before.

"Looking Through the Eyes of a Beautiful Girl" (January 1971) was their next charting hit, which reached No. 24. They were also the backing band for Dave Allenby, a cabaret singer, who issued a cover version of UK group Edison Lighthouse's "She Works in a Woman's Way". It reached the top 40 in February and was co-credited to Allenby and Edison Lighthouse – at the same time "Yellow River" and "Looking Through the Eyes of a Beautiful Girl" were still in the top 40. Autumn issued their debut album, Song to Raymondo, in that year. By March 1971 Jacques was replaced by Alan Marshall (ex-Hot Cottage) on guitar. Also in that month they formed their own company, Collage, in equal share with their business manager Graham Farrell, "to produce and promote its own records and related products."

The new line-up released another charting single, "Falling", which also peaked in the top 40. Unlike their previous charting hits, "Falling", was an original – written by their drummer, Beatson. Their second album, Comes Autumn, appeared later that year via Warner. At the end of 1971 Charlie Wright joined on piano and organ. Their final single, "Just Couldn't Believe It" (1971) featured Marshall, its writer, on lead vocals. The group travelled to the UK but disbanded there early in 1972.

== Afterwards ==
After splitting Beatson, Marshall and McMurray formed a UK group, Mecca before relocating to Canada. In 1976 they formed a Canadian rock band, Wireless, which issued three albums. Romeril lived in Italy, for a few years, where he recorded material as Andy Foxx. Graham and Romeril reformed Autumn in Sydney in 1976 with James Caulfield on keyboards, Dave Hallard on guitar, and Con Westaberg on drums; but disbanded soon after. Autumn reunited for a tribute, benefit concert, Gimme Ted in March 2001 in support of contemporary singer-songwriter, Ted Mulry. For this concert Tony Buggy (keyboards)and Malcolm Wakeford (drums) were a part of the band. Their performances appeared on a 2×DVD video album, Gimme Ted – The Ted Mulry Benefit Concerts (May 2003). Romeril curated the re-release of Autumn's second album, Come Autumn (July 2010), on CD via Aztec Music.

In 2015 Romeril released a tribute album, Will You Remember Me: a Tribute to Ted Mulry... Songwriter, he sang on five of its thirteen tracks, which were written by Mulry. He also engineered and produced the album.

== Discography ==
=== Albums ===
- Song to Raymondo (1971) – Chart Records (SCHL-934254)
- Comes Autumn (1971) – Warner Bros Records (20003)

=== Extended plays ===
- The Best of Whisky A-Go-Go (split EP, 1970) – Chart Records (CHX-11744)
- Day Tripper (1970) – Chart Records
- A Patch of Autumn (1971) – Warner Bros Records

=== Singles ===
- "Mr Henry's Lollypop Shoppe" (1970) – EMI/Columbia (DO 8907)
- "Yellow River" (1970) – Chart Records (PR 200) AUS: No. 1
- "Looking Through the Eyes of a Beautiful Girl" (1971) – Chart Records (PR 212) AUS: No. 24
- "She Works in a Woman's Way" (by Dave Allenby with Autumn) (1971) – Chart Records (PR 211) AUS: No. 40
- "Miracles" (1971) – Chart Records
- "Falling" (1971) – Warner Bros Records (4001) AUS: No. 36
- "Goblin's Gamble" (1971) – Warner Bros Records
- "Lady Anne" (1971)- Warner Bros Records
- "Just Couldn't Believe It" (1971) – Warner Bros Records
