= The Strangers (Australian band) =

Australian rock band (1961–1975)

- Origin: Melbourne, Victoria, Australia
- Genres: Rock
- Years active: 1961–1975
- Labels: W&G; Philips; Fable; Canetoad
- Past members: Laurie Arthur; Peter Robinson; Graeme "Garth" Thompson; Fred Wieland; John Farrar; Terry Walker; John Cosgrove; Bill Pyman; Jim Sifonious; Lloyd Poole

The Strangers were an Australian rock band, which was formed in 1961 and existed until 1975. The band started out playing instrumental numbers in a style similar to The Shadows, with influences from Cliff Richard. The original line-up was Laurie Arthur (lead guitar), Peter Robinson (bass), Graeme "Garth" Thompson (drums) and Fred Wieland (rhythm guitar). Robinson had previously played with a local band "The Thunderbirds" and went on to replace Athol Guy in The Seekers in the late 1970s.

== Founding and history ==
The Strangers were formed in Melbourne as an instrumental rock band in 1961 with the line-up of Laurie Arthur on lead guitar (ex-the Planets, the Chessmen), Peter Robinson on bass guitar (ex-the Thunderbirds), Graeme "Garth" Thompson on drums (ex-the Earls) and Fred Weiland on rhythm guitar (ex-the Lincolns). Instead of joining the prevailing surf music trend, the Strangers modelled themselves on British and European instrumental groups, the Shadows, the Tornados and the Spotnicks. Arthur, Robinson and Weiland had attended Glenroy High School before joining different groups. The Strangers performed across Melbourne's major dance venues.

At the end of 1962, they signed with W&G Records, headed by Ron Tudor, after working as the studio band for The Seekers, Frankie Davidson, Johnny Chester, Merv Benton, Little Gulliver and the Children, Pat Carroll and Joy Lemmon. The group's first charting single was their instrumental cover version of "Cry of the Wild Goose" (written by Terry Gilkyson) backed with "Leavin' Town", which was released in January 1963 and reached number 12 on the Melbourne charts. This was followed in April by an instrumental single "Torlido" / "The Outcast", which reached the Melbourne Top 40.

Arthur left the band in early 1964 and was replaced on lead guitar by John Farrar (who later married Carroll). Farrar also provided vocals on some tracks. In 1964, they supported Colin Cook and released an LP called Colin Cook and the Strangers. Other singles included "Happy Without You" (by Kenny Laguna and Shelley Pinz, 1968), "Melanie Makes Me Smile" (by Tony Macaulay and Barry Mason, 1970), "Looking Through the Eyes of a Beautiful Girl" (1970), "If You Gotta Make a Fool of Somebody" (Rudy Clark, 1965) and a cover of Five Americans, "Western Union" (written by Mike Rabon, Norman Ezell and John Durrill, 1967).

Also in 1964, the band supported Roy Orbison and Paul and Paula on an Australian tour which featured The Surfaris and The Beach Boys. Those support gigs influenced some early vocal recordings in "Poppa Oom Mow Mow", "Sunday Kind of Love," "If You Gotta Make a Fool of Somebody" and later "In My Room", a Beach Boys ballad.

== Television band ==
In August 1964, The Strangers were selected as the resident backing band on the Melbourne based teenage television pop program The Go!! Show, in which they appeared each week from 1964 to 1967. Farrar married Pat Carroll, who appeared on the show as a singer with Olivia Newton-John. After "The Go!! Show" ended, The Strangers became the resident group on HSV-7's Sunnyside Up program. In all, the band appeared on television at least once a week for nine years.

During the mid-1960s, the band changed labels from W&G Records to Go Records. After the demise of the Go!! Show and its associated record label, they moved to Philips Records, and finally to Fable Records in 1970.

== Replacements and collaborations ==
In February 1967, Terry Walker (ex Glen Ingram & The Hi-Five) replaced Fred Wieland, who left to join The Mixtures. During 1969, The Strangers' cover of "Melanie Makes Me Smile" made No. 16 in Sydney, No. 9 in Melbourne and No. 7 in Brisbane. Later singles included "Mr. President" (composed by Trevor 'Dozy' Davies, John 'Beaky' Dymond and Ian 'Tich' Amey) in 1970 and, in 1971, "Sweet Water" (Fletcher/Flett), a cover of a song by obscure British band Brass Monkey.

The group effectively broke up in mid-1970, with Farrar moving to the UK and joining Shadows members Hank Marvin and Bruce Welch in Marvin, Welch & Farrar, and then the re-formed Shadows. Later that year Robinson and Thompson reformed The Strangers (sometimes billed as The New Strangers), with guitarists John Cosgrove (ex Fendermen) and Bill Pyman. Cosgrove left in early 1973 and was replaced by Jim Sifonious (ex Dove), before the band finally broke up in 1975.

Throughout the group's 14 years, The Strangers provided backing for many local and overseas acts. These included: Johnny Farnham, Russell Morris, Johnny Young, Neil Sedaka, Johnny O'Keefe, The Seekers, Merv Benton, Ted Mulry, Lynne Randell, Ross D. Wyllie, Yvonne Barrett, Grantley Dee, Pat Carroll, Little Gulliver, Barry Crocker, Buddy England, Ronnie Burns, Town Criers, Masters Apprentices, Axiom, Hans Poulsen and Lionel Rose.

The Strangers set an exceptional standard for live sound, using the best equipment they could procure: German Dynacord microphones and public address systems, multiple guitar effects units, including Leslie speakers, an exponential horn for the bass guitar, and carefully selected and matching guitars (e.g. 6- and 12-string Rickenbackers , and Maton El Toros) and amplifiers.

Farrar later moved to the USA, and wrote and produced a number of hits for Olivia Newton-John, including "Hopelessly Devoted to You", "Have You Never Been Mellow" and "Magic".

Fred Wieland left to join The Mixtures in 1967 staying until their breakup in 1976, died of lung cancer at the age of 75 on 10 December 2018.

== Members ==
- Laurie Arthur – lead guitar, vocals (1961–1964)
- Peter Robinson – bass guitar, vocals (1961–1975)
- Graeme "Garth" Thompson – drums (1961–1975)
- Fred Weiland – rhythm guitar, vocals (1961–1967)
- John Farrar – guitar, vocals (1964–1970)
- Terry Walker – lead vocals (1967–1970)
- Bill Pyman – guitar (1970–1973)
- John Cosgrove – guitar (1970–1973)
- Jim Sifonious – guitar (1973–1975)

== Discography ==
=== Charting singles ===
Year	Single	Chart position
Year	Single	AU
1963	"It's Up To You" (with Colin Cook & The Thin Men)	39
1963	"The Cry of The Wild Goose"	35
1963	"Leavin' Town"	flip
1963	"Torlido"	56
1964	"Heart" (with Colin Cook)	39
1965	"If You Gotta Make a Fool of Somebody"	60
1966	"Put Yourself In My Place"	94
1967	"Western Union"	46
1968	"Happy Without You"	28
1969	"Lady Scorpio"	31
1970	"Melanie Makes Me Smile"	10
1970	"Mr. President"	78
1970	"Looking Through The Eyes of Love"	flip
1971	"Sweet Water"	74

The Strangers CDs

- Best of the Strangers
- Bobby & Laurie
- Colin Cook & the Strangers

The Strangers LP/EPs on vinyl

- The Strangers
- Best of the (Original) Strangers
- Let's Go With the Strangers
- Colin Cook and the Strangers

The Strangers cuts on vinyl (with John Farrar)

- Poppa Oom Mow Mow
- Sunday Kind of Love
- If You Gotta Make a Fool of Somebody
- Let's Go Let's Go Let's Go
- In My Room
- Never on a Sunday
- Put Yourself in My Place
- Fever
- Western Union
- Cool Jerk
- Happy Without You
- Take the Time
- Lady Scorpio
- California Soul
- Sweet September
- Paper Cup
- Melanie Makes Me Smile
- If You Think You're Groovy
- Walkin'
- Fun Fun Fun
- Stagecoach
- Matchbox
- I Call Your Name
- Blues by Five
- Bend Me Shape Me
- Elenore
- I Say a Little Prayer
- Will You Still Love Me Tomorrow
- I Can Hear Music
- Paperback Writer
- Little Deuce Coupe
- Little St. Nick
- Standing in the Shadows of Love
- I've Got You Under My Skin
- Proud Mary
- Sandy
- Do It Again
- Good Vibrations
- Windows in Your Eyes
