= Melanie Makes Me Smile =

1970 song written by Barry Mason and Tony Macaulay

Single by Tony Burrows
- B-side: "I'll Get Along Somehow Girl"
- Released: April 1970
- Genre: Pop
- Length: 3:04
- Label: Bell
- Songwriters: Barry Mason, Tony Macaulay
- Producer: Tony Macaulay

"Melanie Makes Me Smile"

Single by The Strangers
- Released: June 1970
- Genre: Pop
- Label: Fable
- Songwriters: Barry Mason, Tony Macaulay
- Producer: June Productions

"Melanie Makes Me Smile" is a 1970 song written by English songwriters Barry Mason and Tony Macaulay. A version by Tony Burrows was released in April 1970, and reached No. 87 in the US. Macaulay also produced Burrows' single. Burrows had previously recorded Mason and Macauley's "Love Grows (Where My Rosemary Goes)" (January 1970) as lead singer of Edison Lighthouse.

A cover version of "Melanie Makes Me Smile" was released by Australian pop group The Strangers in June 1970, and it became a top 10 hit there in September.

== Other versions ==
Former First Edition singer Terry Williams covered "Melanie Makes Me Smile" in 1972. It was released as a single and reached the top 10 on the Canadian Adult Contemporary chart during the winter of 1973. It also charted in the US.

== Charts ==
=== Weekly charts ===
Tony Burrows

Chart (1970)	Peak position
Canada Top Singles (RPM)	72
US Billboard Hot 100	87
US Cash Box Top 100	95

The Strangers

Chart (1970)	Peak position
Australia (Kent Music Report)	10

Terry Williams cover version

Chart (1972–1973)	Peak position
Canada Adult Contemporary (RPM)	7
US Billboard Hot 100	112
US Cash Box Top 100	98

=== Year-end charts ===
The Strangers

Chart (1970)	Rank
Australia	72
