= 1970 radio ban =

Music industry dispute in Australia

- Date: 23 May 1970 – 24 October 1970
- Location: Australia
- Also known as: 1970 record ban
- Participants: Federation of Australian Radio Broadcasters, Australasian Performing Right Association
- Outcome: status quo

The Australian 1970 Radio Ban or 1970 Record Ban was a "pay for play" dispute in the local music industry that lasted from May until October. During this period, a simmering disagreement between commercial radio stations – represented by the Federation of Australian Radio Broadcasters (FARB) – and the six largest record labels – represented by Australasian Performing Right Association (APRA) – resulted in major United Kingdom and Australian pop songs being refused airplay. The government-owned Australian Broadcasting Corporation – which had its own copyright and royalty arrangement with recording and music publishing companies – did not take part in the dispute. The ban did not extend to releases by American artists. Some radio disc jockeys, such as Stan Rofe, defied the ban by playing songs according to their personal tastes.

Teen-oriented pop music newspaper Go-Set reported on the dispute: it interviewed affected musicians and its journalists argued for the removal of the ban. Once the ban was lifted, status quo ante resulted: APRA's record companies returned to supplying free promotional material and FARB's radio stations resumed playing their records.

During the ban some Australian musicians recorded covers of UK artists' hits on previously minor labels. The Mixtures, for example, recorded Mungo Jerry's "In the Summertime" on the Fable Label which was released in August. It peaked at No. 1 for nine weeks to be displaced by "Yellow River" – originally by Christie – which was covered by two Australian groups, Jigsaw (from Melbourne) and Autumn (from Sydney). Music charts from the period indicate that in the years immediately following the ban, there was a significant reduction in the number of Australian acts who scored major chart peaks.

== Background ==
The 1970 Radio Ban had its origins early in 1969. Following the enactment of the new Copyright Act 1968, a group of recording companies – including most of the members of the Australasian Performing Right Association (APRA) – decided to scrap a long-standing royalty agreement with commercial radio stations that dated back to the 1950s. The recording companies included five major overseas labels Polygram, EMI, RCA, CBS and Warner and Australia's leading local company, Festival.

APRA and the record labels demanded payment for pop records played on commercial radio claiming they were providing free programming for radio stations. Record companies traditionally supplied stations with free promotional copies of new singles. The commercial radio lobby – represented by the Federation of Australian Radio Broadcasters (FARB) – balked at the proposed levy. They argued they provided a large amount of free promotion for the records they played. The government-owned Australian Broadcasting Corporation – which had its own copyright and royalty arrangement with recording and music publishing companies – did not take part in the dispute.

In April 1970, teen-oriented pop music newspaper Go-Set reported on the dispute and interviewed musicians including former King of Pop Normie Rowe. He feared "it could be a major blow to the Australian scene." Other musicians expected the situation would be resolved. Radio disc jockey and Go-Set columnist Stan Rofe claimed discussions were progressing and the threat of a ban was over. Fellow columnist and compiler of the Go-Set National Top 40, Ed Nimmervoll, predicted that its charts would be compromised as local artists' record sales were dependent on radio play.

After negotiations between the parties broke down in late May 1970, the recording companies imposed a six-month embargo on the supply of promotional records to radio stations. In retaliation, FARB members boycotted all new major label releases by UK or Australian artists, but not American artists, and refused to include records from these companies in their weekly chart surveys.

This was a serious matter as there was only one Australian national pop chart, published by Go-Set, and most Top 40 charts were collated locally by individual radio stations in major cities and towns. Darryl Cotton, lead singer of pop group Zoot was concerned that the public would be unaware of new releases by local acts. Solo singer Ronnie Burns believed it would affect groups more than individuals, who had greater access to television shows.

Another singer, Russell Morris, criticised the policy which led to the ban, "[the Government] didn't realise that the pop recording market is a very large and important industry". As from 30 May, Nimmervoll's charts in Go-Set were based on direct surveying of large record-selling stores instead of relying on radio stations' Top 40s.

Some disc jockeys, including Rofe, defied the ban on their radio shows – he regularly played "Turn Up Your Radio" by The Masters Apprentices which had been issued by EMI in April. Rofe also championed the cause of Australian musicians in Go-Set by criticising mainstream media coverage of the dispute.

During the ban, many UK hits like The Beatles' "The Long and Winding Road" and Mary Hopkin's "Knock, Knock Who's There?" gained only limited exposure in Australia. Some local artists released cover versions of UK hits; Melbourne singer Liv Maessen's "Knock, Knock, Who's There" debuted in the Top 10 in May with co-credit to Hopkin and Maessen. It eventually peaked at No. 2 in early August and earned Maessen the first gold record ever awarded to an Australian female artist. "In the Summertime" by The Mixtures was a cover of Mungo Jerry's hit which reached No. 1 in August for nine weeks. Melbourne band Jigsaw and Sydney band Autumn both had success with their respective versions of Christie's hit song, "Yellow River". "Yellow River" displaced "In the Summertime" at No. 1 in late October. For a short period, the ban had the inadvertent effect of putting more local musicians to air than ever before, and also opened the door to the 'underground' artists on previously minor labels such as Fable Label.

Music charts in the years immediately following the ban show there was a significant reduction in the number of Australian acts who scored major chart peaks. The Go-Set charts for 1972, for example, indicate that only two Australian acts (Colleen Hewett and Blackfeather) had national No. 1 hits; while in 1973 no Australian act scored a No. 1 hit.
