= The Pushbike Song =

Single by The Mixtures
- B-side: "Who Loves Ya"
- Released: December 1970
- Recorded: 1970
- Genre: Bubblegum pop
- Label: Polydor (UK); Fable (Australia)
- Songwriters: Idris and Evan Jones
- Producer: David Mackay

The Mixtures singles chronology
"In the Summertime" (1970)	"The Pushbike Song" (1970)	"Henry Ford" (1971)

"The Pushbike Song" is a song originally recorded by Australian band The Mixtures and released in 1970. The single was a chart success, reaching numbers one and two in the Australian and UK charts respectively. It has subsequently been covered by various artists.

== History and chart success ==
Written by brothers Idris and Evan Jones, "The Pushbike Song" was released in 1970 and reached the top-spot for two weeks in the Australian charts in March 1971. It also proved popular in the UK, reaching the number two spot on 31 January (beaten by George Harrison's "My Sweet Lord"), and number 31 in Canada.

As Will Hodgkinson has pointed out, the song is essentially Mungo Jerry's "In the Summertime" with similar but different lyrics. The Mixtures had previously had a hit with a version of "In The Summertime" in Australia. (Mungo Jerry subsequently covered "The Pushbike Song" in 1990).

== Chart performance ==
=== Weekly charts ===
Chart (1970–71)	Peak position
Australia KMR	1
Canada RPM Top Singles	31
Canada RPM Adult Contemporary	11
Ireland (IRMA)	3
New Zealand (Listener)	1
South Africa (Springbok)	9
UK Singles (Official Charts)	2
US Billboard Hot 100	44
US Billboard Easy Listening	19
US Cash Box Top 100	44

=== Year-end charts ===
Chart (1971)	Rank
Australia	3
UK	6
US (Joel Whitburn's Pop Annual)	279

== Covers ==
- Toomapojad "Jalgrattal sõidan" (1970, Estonia)
- Faraon "Šlapací kolo" (1971, Czechoslovakia)

=== Vinyl and CD releases ===
- Mungo Jerry (1990, UK)
- The Beggars (70s, Germany)
- The Great American Disaster (1970, USA)
- Anita Harris (2008, UK)
- Pinky and Perky (1971, UK)
- The Wurzels (1978, UK) - parody of the original song; appears on The Best of Adge Cutler and the Wurzels
- Leon Henry/Carlin (1971, UK) - appears on Top of the Tots Pop Party Vol. 3 (Pickwick Records)
- The New Seekers/Mick Flinn (2006) - appears on The New Seekers Live
- The Clowns (1972, Brazil) - appears on the album A Patota
- Olivia Newton-John (2011, Australia) - appears on the soundtrack to the film A Few Best Men
- The Henry Rudolph Singers (1972, New Zealand) - from the album of the same name.

== Television / other ==
A music video was created for the song in 1970, which depicted the band and friends (including the model Monica Hughes) riding bicycles through the streets of Melbourne. Filmed in black and white, it was notable for scenes involving a procession of bicycles (including a penny-farthing) and rollerskaters on a busy six-lane Melbourne arterial road, and a scene of four members of the band 'riding' a tandem bicycle atop a car transporter travelling at speed across the King Street Bridge (Melbourne).

The song was used in a sketch by Paul Hogan on The Paul Hogan Show, which parodied the promotional film, and featured cast member and 1976 Miss World pageant runner up Karen Pini

Cilla Black performs a version of the song as part of her "Cillagram" segment on her Surprise! Surprise! television show, season 2, episode 4 which aired on ITV, 11th November 1984.

Australia's Young Talent Time also performed the song in a 1986 episode.

Australian children's show Play School recorded a cover for the album There's a Bear in There, sung by Philip Quast.

Australian singer-songwriter Olivia Newton-John recorded a cover for the soundtrack of the 2011 comedy film A Few Best Men.

In 2012, "The Pushbike Song" was used on an advertising campaign for Tooheys 5 Seeds Cloudy Cider. The vocals on that version are purportedly a performance by "gypsy banjo player, Benny 'The Giant' Gogasa" recorded via Skype. This is probably a spoof on the part of the advertising agency, for what appears to be a local studio recording, with no independent evidence that Benny 'The Giant' Gogasa and "his band of orphans, misfits and mildly deformed gypsy musicians" actually exists.

It was also heard in the Hotch Potch House episode "Round and Round" during a film from the garden door of the model house about a girl getting a new bike.

== See also ==
- List of number-one singles in Australia during the 1970s#1971
