= Kev Moore =

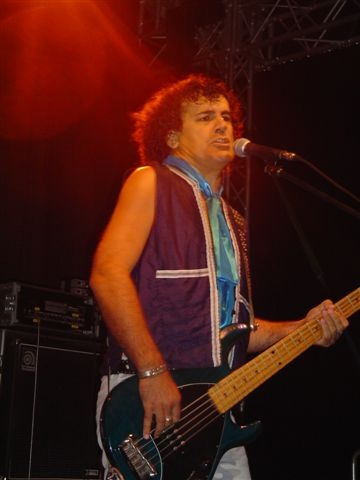

Background information
- Born: 20 May 1958 (age 67)
- Genres: Hard rock, glam rock
- Instrument: Bass guitar
- Years active: 1979–present
- Website: mooremusic.biz

Kev Moore (born 20 May 1958) is an English bass player and a vocalist. Formerly with Tubeless Hearts, he played with English pop band Christie from 1990 to 2003, and was featured in Graham Oliver's Saxon on two European tours, before other commitments resulted in John Ward taking over vocal duties for the resulting Oliver/Dawson Saxon CD releases. Nevertheless, he appeared on Graham Oliver's solo album End of an Era returning the favour after Oliver appeared on Tubeless Hearts' Three CD.

Since 1998, he has been an occasional member of The Gonads, the punk band founded in the mid-1970s by a journalist Garry Bushell, touring America and appearing on the albums Back and Barking and Schiz-oi-phrenia in addition to two videos of songs from the yet-to-be-released third Gonads album featured on the Bushell on the Box DVD.

As of 2005, Moore has been lead vocalist and bassist with BC Sweet, the band founded by Sweet vocalist, the late Brian Connolly.

In 2009, he toured again with Christie with a string of dates commencing in Germany.

January 2009 saw the recording and digital download release of "Derby Pride", a new song for Derby County Football Club, which was scheduled for release as a CD single in Spring 2009.

In May 2009, Christie reconvened as the 1990 line-up for rehearsals and to begin a reunion European tour with dates through December.

In 2012, he joined the re-formed Danish metal band Witch Cross appearing at the Keep It True festival in Germany. Subsequently, he co-wrote the band's 2013 follow-up to their 1984 debut, entitled Axe to Grind

== Discography ==
=== Album releases of note ===
- (1992) featuring Christie: Absence of Time
- (1994) Tubeless Hearts: Three
- (1994) featuring Christie: Thommy’s Christmas Party
- (1999) The Gonads: Back and Barking
- (2001) Graham Oliver: End of an Era
- (2001) The Gonads: Schiz-oi-phrenia
- (2013) Witch Cross: Axe to Grind
- (2014) featuring Witch Cross: Harder than Steel
- (2014) Steve Bonham: Songsmith (bass)
- (2016) Paidarion Finlandia Project: Two Worlds Encounter

=== Independent releases ===
- (1982) Tubeless Hearts: Telephone/Paperback Romance
- (1990) Tubeless Hearts: 6 from 3
- (1997) Dedication: Under The Covers
- (2006) Kev Moore: The Classic Collection
- (2006) Kev Moore: Stars over Desert Springs EP
- (2006) Kev Moore: One Moore Reggae for the Road
- (2009) Kev Moore: Derby Pride, The Co-Op Cow, The Turre Stomp (as digital download)
- (2009) Kev Moore: Fan Fayre for the Commons people CD album
- (2010) Kev Moore: The Long Walk Home - Digital Download only
- (2011) Kev Moore: Blue Odyssey
