= Evan Jones (musician) =

Australian musician

- Born: James Evan Jones; 16 April 1948 (age 78)
- Origin: Adelaide, South Australia, Australia
- Genres: Pop
- Occupations: Musician, writer, photographer
- Instruments: Vocals, Guitar
- Labels: Raven, Nationwide, Astor, Countryside, EMI Custom

James Evan Jones is an Australian musician and photographer. Together with his brother Idris Jones he wrote "The Pushbike Song" (1970) for pop group, the Mixtures, which became a number-one hit in Australia.

== Background ==
James Evan Jones, was born in 1948 in Adelaide. He was a singer-guitarist for the Gingerbread Men, a local pop music band from the mid-1960s, before his career was interrupted by military service in Vietnam. Other members were his brother, Idris Lloyd Jones on lead vocals and guitar, as well as Tony McNicoll on drums and Dean Birbeck on bass guitar. They released a single, "Looking at You" / "Goodnight" (1965, W&G).

His brother Idris was lead vocalist of the Mixtures from late 1967, in Melbourne. Both Jones brothers wrote the Mixture's track, "The Pushbike Song", which was released as a single by the band in late 1970. As well as reaching No. 1 in Australia, it charted in the United Kingdom and United States.

== Career ==
In 1977 two songs Jones had written were released by Graham Cornes as a single, "I Gotta Girl" backed with "Untying the Laces" (J & B Records).

In 1981, backed by the band Y Knot, he issued a single, "Mm! Mm! Don't Cha Love Summertime!" which reached No. 85 on the Australian Single Charts. Jones worked as a children's television host, appearing on Here's Humphrey, C'mon Kids and Cartoon Connection.

== Discography ==
=== Albums ===
Title	Album details
Trudy	Released: 1972; Format: LP; Label: Raven (RNLP-102)

=== Singles ===
List of singles, with selected chart positions
Year	Title	Peak chart positions
Year	Title	AUS
1972	"Little Black Spider"/"Shoo Fly Shoo"	-
1972	"Jesus Song"/"All Men Are Equal"	-
1976	"Damn' Ya Darlin" (with Idris)	-
1981	"Mm! Mm! Don't Cha Love Summertime" (As Evan Jones and Y Knot)	85
1981	""And I Wish You Were Staying Forever"	-
