= Wireless (band) =

Former Australian-Canadian rock band (1976–1980)

- Origin: Canada
- Genres: Rock, progressive rock
- Years active: 1976–1980
- Labels: Atlantic, Anthem
- Past members: Mike Crawford; Allan Marshall; Steve McMurray; Marty Morin; Glenn Beatson; Mike Lalonde; Lawrence DelGrande

Wireless was an Australian-Canadian rock band active from 1976 to 1980. The band recorded three albums during their career: Wireless (1976), Positively Human Relatively Sane (1978) and No Static (1980).

== History ==
Wireless was formed in 1976 by bassist Allan Marshall, guitarist Steve McMurray and drummer Glenn Beatson, who had played together in an Australian pop music band, Autumn. They released a self-titled album on the Atlantic label; the album included some original songs.

The band soon signed with WEA Music.

The band's album Positively Human Relatively Sane did not sell well; the next album, No Static, was produced by Geddy Lee (of the band Rush). Rush were friends with, and supporters of, Wireless. The band would tour with Rush several times in the late 1970s. Wireless' albums were later remastered and released by Rock Candy Records.

== Members ==
- Mike Crawford - Guitar, vocals
- Allan Marshall - Bass, vocals
- Steve McMurray - Guitar, vocals
- Marty Morin - drums
- Glenn Beatson - Drums
- Mike Lalonde - Vocals
- Lawrence DelGrande - Keyboard, vocals

== Discography ==
- Wireless (1976)
- Positively Human Relatively Sane (1978)
- No Static (1980)
