= San Bernadino (song) =

1970 single by Christie

Single by Christie

from the album Christie
- B-side: "Here I Am"
- Released: 18 September 1970
- Genre: Sunshine pop
- Length: 3:17
- Label: CBS; Epic
- Songwriter: Jeff Christie
- Producer: Mike Smith

Christie singles chronology
| "Yellow River" (1970) | "San Bernadino" (1970) | "Man of Many Faces" (1971) |

"San Bernadino" is a 1970 song by English band Christie. The song did not match the success of their previous single "Yellow River", but was still a top-ten hit in several countries and topped the charts in Switzerland. In the US, the song only managed to peak at number 100 on 30 January 1971. After the song became a hit, the band members admitted that they had never visited the city of San Bernardino, California. Despite this, the song was eventually adopted by the city in 2006 as its City Song.

== Charts ==
| Chart (1970–71) | Peak position |
|---|---|
| Australia (Go-Set) | 38 |
| Australia (Kent Music Report) | 42 |
| Austria (Ö3 Austria Top 40) | 8 |
| Finland (Suomen virallinen lista) | 20 |
| Germany (GfK) | 5 |
| Ireland (IRMA) | 4 |
| New Zealand (Listener) | 6 |
| Norway (VG-lista) | 5 |
| South Africa (Springbok Radio) | 7 |
| Spain (Promusicae) | 3 |
| Switzerland (Schweizer Hitparade) | 1 |
| UK Singles (OCC) | 7 |
| US Billboard Hot 100 | 100 |

== Other versions ==
The song has been covered by multiple artists and in multiple languages.

- Australian band Harry Young and Sabbath recorded the song in 1970.
- German singer Roberto Blanco released his German version in 1970.
- Los Mismos released their Spanish version in 1971.
- Estonian singer Jaak Joala also recorded the song in 1971 with the title "Suvemälestus" ("Summer Memory").
- In 1976, it was released in Danish titled "Hvergang hun smiler" by De 4 Esser.
