= Shame and Scandal in the Family =

Song by Sir Lancelot and Lord Melody

"Shame and Scandal in the Family", also known as "Shame & Scandal" for short, is a song written by calypso singer Sir Lancelot for the film I Walked with a Zombie in 1943 and originally titled "Fort Holland Calypso Song". Sir Lancelot issued his recording of it in the late 1940s. The Sir Lancelot version was covered by folk singers Odetta and Burl Ives. In 1962, Trinidadian calypsonian Lord Melody wrote new lyrics for the verses while keeping the melody and the chorus. The Historical Museum of Southern Florida said of Lord Melody's version, "No calypso has been more extensively recorded."

== Lyrical content ==
In Sir Lancelot's version, the lyric reports gossip about a prominent family on a Caribbean island named San Sebastian.

In Lord Melody's 1960s version, the story follows a young Puerto Rican man in search of a wife. In each of the verses, the young man asks his father for permission to marry a different woman, only to be told he can not marry the girl as "The girl is your sister, but your mamma don't know". However, the tables are turned during the last verse, where the young man's mother tells him that "Your daddy ain't your daddy, but your daddy don't know", clearing the path for him to marry any of the girls.

The story in Lord Melody's version is identical to that narrated in Robert William Service's poem "Madame La Marquise", from the 1940 collection Bar-Room Ballads. The young French aristocratic Hongray de la Glaciere asks his Papa, the Marquis de la Glaciere, permission to marry Mirabelle de Veau, only to find out that Mirabelle is the illegitimate daughter of the Marquis, and so the marriage between the two young ones would be an incestuous one. Years later, Hongray seeks permission to marry Raymonde de la Veal: but again, Papa reveals that Raymonde is also his illegitimate daughter, and the relationship between the two would be incestuous. Finally, the Mother, the Marquise de la Glaciere, approaches her son in his private room, and she reveals that he may marry either Mirabelle de Veau or Raymonde de la Veal, as Papa the Marquis is not his legitimate father.

== Notable cover versions ==
"Shame and Scandal in the Family"

Single by Shawn Elliott

from the album Shame and Scandal Plus Plenty More Songs and Swingers
- Released: November 1964
- Genre: Calypso
- Length: 2:38
- Label: Roulette Records
- Producer: Hugo & Luigi

- In 1962, the Trinidadian calypsonian Lord Melody used Sir Lancelot's song as the basis of his song "Shame and Scandal", although he titled it "Wau, Wau". Melody's version used the same chorus and tune as the original 1943 song but with different verses.
- In 1964, the Kingston Trio included a live performance of the song (retitled "Ah Woe, Ah Me!") on their last Capitol Records album Back in Town.
- Also in 1964, American actor/singer Shawn Elliott released his version titled "Shame and Scandal in the Family".
- In 1965, British comedy actor Lance Percival reached number 37 on the UK Singles Chart with his version, also titled "Shame and Scandal in the Family".
- In the mid-1960s, Jamaica's Kingston Hilton Hotel resident mento band, the Hiltonaires, also recorded it as "Shame and Scandal".
- In 1965, a ska cover version was recorded in Jamaica by Peter Tosh and the Wailers on vocals, backed by the Skatalites and released on the Studio One label.
- In 1972, Australian singer Johnny Chester's version with Jigsaw titled "Shame and Scandal (In the Family)" peaked at No. 13 on the Go-Set National Top 40.
- In 1975, the Merrymen recorded their version for their album Sun Living.
- In 1977, American vocal group the Stylistics released a cover version titled "Shame and Scandal in the Family" from their album, Sun & Soul. The single reached No. 87 on the Hot Soul Singles chart. One year later, the intro of this version of the song would be used for Rede Tupi's station ID.
- In 1983, Clint Eastwood & General Saint released a reggae cover version.

== Madness version ==
"Shame & Scandal"

Single by Madness

from the album The Dangermen Sessions Vol. 1
- Released: 25 July 2005
- Recorded: 2005
- Genre: Ska, pop
- Length: 2:52
- Label: V2
- Songwriter: Lord / Pinard
- Producer: Dennis Bovell

Madness singles chronology
"Drip Fed Fred" (2000)	"Shame & Scandal" (2005)	"Girl Why Don't You" (2005)

British ska/pop band Madness covered the song having previously covered several Prince Buster ska recordings, including the songs "Madness" and "One Step Beyond". The band began performing the song at a series of low-key performances as 'the Dangermen' in 2005.

Madness later recorded the song for their covers album The Dangermen Sessions Vol. 1, and released it as a single later that year.

=== Track listings ===
These are the formats and track listings of major single releases of "Shame & Scandal".

- 7" single
1. "Shame & Scandal" (Lord/Pinard) - 2:52
2. "Shame & Scandal" (dub) (Lord/Pinard) - 2:56
3. "Shame & Scandal" (Peter Touch (Tosh) and the Wailers) - 3:03
- CD single
1. "Shame & Scandal" (Lord/Pinard) - 2:52
2. "Skylarking" (Hinds) - 3:02
3. "Dreader Than Dread" (Galnek) - 3:04

=== Chart performance ===
The Madness release did not fare well in the United Kingdom, only spending two weeks in the charts, peaking at number 38. However, the song did better in France, where it peaked at number 12 and spent 19 weeks on the charts. The song also made an appearance on the Swiss Singles Top 100, spending 8 weeks on the charts and reaching a high of number 69, and just made the Dutch Single Top 100, hitting number 100 and remaining in the chart for a single week.

Chart	Peak position
French singles chart	12
UK Singles Chart	38
Swiss singles chart	69
Dutch Single Top 100	100
