= Merv Benton =

Australian pop singer (born 1942)

- Born: Mervyn Bonson; 12 August 1942 (age 84); Melbourne, Victoria, Australia
- Genres: Pop
- Occupations: Singer, bank public relations officer
- Instrument: vocals
- Years active: 1960–1967
- Labels: W&G; Allstar; Raven; Rebel; Canetoad

Merv Benton (born Mervyn Bonson, 12 August 1942) is an Australian former pop singer who was active mainly in the mid-1960s. His most popular singles were "Baby Let's Play House" (1964), "I Got Burned", "Yield Not to Temptation", "Don't Destroy Me" (all in 1965) and "You've Got What it Takes" (1966). For the 1966 Go-Set pop poll he was listed third most popular male vocalist. Australian musicologist, Ian McFarlane, described him as, "the epitome of the good-looking, clean-cut pop idol." In late 1966, Benton was diagnosed with laryngeal polyps; the resulting treatment and recovery curtailed his music career. He became a real estate agent, and later organised the building of child care centres both in Queensland (until 1990) and in Phoenix, Arizona after relocating there in 1991.

== Biography ==
Merv Benton was born as Mervyn Bonson on 12 August 1942, in Melbourne. He grew up with his parents Edward Bonson, a manufacturer and Rae Bonson (née Hadlow) and a sibling. Benton attended Preston High School and left to work as a trainee bank clerk. He took weekly singing lessons from Melbourne-based vocal teacher, Jack White.

Benton started his singing career in October 1960 after a friend, Graeme Howie, entered him into a local talent quest. Upon winning with his rendition of "Don't Leave Me This Way", he met artist, manager, and promoter Brian de Courcy. De Courcy introduced Benton to instrumental pop group the Ramrods, which were led by Ian B Allen. Benton's early performances with the Ramrods were at Whittlesea Hall and Preston Migrant Centre. He also sang in front of the Chessmen (see Johnny Chester) and the Strangers.

Early in 1964, while still working at the bank, Benton completed demo recordings with Chester producing for W&G Records. Session musicians were Mick Lynch on drums, Frank McMahon on bass guitar, Albert Stacpool on keyboards and his brother Les Stacpool on lead guitar (all members of the Chessmen). Also observing was local radio personality, Stan Rofe. From the sessions, W&G issued Benton's first single, his rendition of "Baby Let's Play House" in March 1964, also covered by Elvis Presley in 1955. Scarth Flett of The Australian Women's Weekly described Benton, "slim 5ft. 9½in., with brown hair and brown eyes, Merv is a newcomer to show business." With Rofe's promotion, the single was popular on Melbourne radio, where it reached No. 17 on the local charts. In June Benton, backed by the Strangers, issued "Nervous Breakdown", previously released by Eddie Cochran. He followed with a four-track extended play (EP), Merv Benton (September 1964) and a full-length studio album, Come on and Get Me (1964). By November of that year, the artist had appeared on TV shows, Sing, Sing, Sing (four times) and In Melbourne Tonight (twice).

His sixth single, "I Got Burned" (May 1965), peaked at No. 13 in Melbourne and also charted in Adelaide and Brisbane. It is a cover of Ral Donner's 1963 single. For the recording, he was backed by the Tamlas, which comprised former band-mate Allen on bass guitar (ex-the Ramrods, the Planets) with Eddie Chappell on drums (ex-Checkmates), Charlie Gauld on guitar (ex-the Thunderbirds) and Noel Watson on guitar (ex-Tridents). According to David Kent's back-dated Australian Chart Book 1940–1969, it reached No. 18, nationally. Soon after the Tamlas line-up was Chappell, Les Stacpool, Ron Gilbey on guitar and Dennis Tucker on bass guitar (ex-Rondells). Other popular 1965 singles were "Yield Not to Temptation" (August) (original by Bobby Bland, 1962) and "Don't Destroy Me" (October).

Benton's 11th single, "You've Got What It Takes", appeared in February 1966 and was popular in Melbourne. The singer started having "a nagging throat problem." By August, he was diagnosed with laryngeal polyps, which were surgically removed with his subsequent recovery expected to take over six months. In October of that year, he was listed third most popular male vocalist on national teen pop newspaper, Go-Set pop poll. According to a contemporary newspaper, "[he] was advised to rest his voice for two months, but didn't because he 'didn't want to disappoint his fans'." De Courcy announced Benton's retirement in November 1966. The Canberra Times' Garry Raffaele reviewed Benton's compilation album, The Best of Merv Benton (1966) in December. Raffaele observed, "If [his] throat has in fact given up, I doubt if the musical world will grieve over much... I would willingly let him slip back into the Limbo which has claimed so many Australian rock singers." Despite Benton's infirmity W&G Records continued to release his singles into 1967.

Australian musicologist Ian McFarlane, observed Benton was "the epitome of the good-looking, clean-cut pop idol." His vocal problems persisted for about 18 months – "[he] never returned to full-time singing" – to resume working for a bank's public relations department. Benton relocated to Queensland in 1969 and became a real estate agent. Prior to relocating, he had entered a Melbourne recording studio, backed by the Fendermen. Benton issued a country music album, Great Country Songs, in 1970 on W&G Records. Michael Foster of The Canberra Times, noticed, "[he] has the roughness o£ tone which marks Johnny Cash and the same sincerity of approach."

Former bandmate Allen convinced Benton to record three vocal tracks for a five-track EP, Merv Benton with the Allstars (1986). The Allstars comprised Allen on bass guitar, Les Stacpool on guitar, Henry Bource on saxophone, Ron Chapman on drums and Murray Robertson on keyboards. As a real estate agent, he began to manage the building of child care centres. Benton migrated to the United States in 1991, he settled near Phoenix, Arizona and worked as consultant-manager of an American child care centre chain. As of 2003, Benton is married with four children.

== Discography ==
=== Albums ===
- Come on and Get Me (1964) – W&G Records (WGB-1916)
- Sounds Great (1965) – W&G Records (WGB-2494)
- Best of Merv Benton (compilation, 1966) – W&G Records (WGB-2631)
- Great Country Songs (Movin' On) (1970) – W&G Records (WGB-26/S/5481)
- The Fabulous Merv Benson (compilation, 1984) – Raven Records (RVLP 16)

=== Extended plays ===
- Merv Benton's Hits (September 1964) – W&G Records (E-1976)
- Dollars and Dimes (May 1965) – W&G Records (E-2407)
- Rockin' Hot (January 1966) – W&G Records (E-2555)
- We Got Love (April 1966) – W&G Records (E-2556)
- More Merv Benton (August 1966) – W&G Records (E-2707)
- Merv Benton with the All Stars (1986) – Allstar Records (ASR 1001)

=== Singles ===
Year	Title	Peak chart positions	Album
Year	Title	AUS	Album
1964	"Baby Let's Play House"	47	Merv Benton's Hits
1964	"Nervous Breakdown"	67	Merv Benton's Hits
1964	"Be Sweet"	52	Merv Benton's Hits
1964	"Come on and Get Me"	65	Come on and Get Me
1965	"It's Love Baby"	70	Dollars and Dimes
1965	"I Got Burned"	18	Rockin' Hot
1965	"Yield not to Temptation"	29	Sounds Great
1965	"Don't Destroy Me"	34	Sounds Great
1965	"(I Do The) Shimmy Shimmy"	56	Sounds Great
1965	"We Got Love"	50	We Got Love
1966	"You Got What It Takes"	45	More Merv Benton
1966	"The Worryin' Kind"	47	More Merv Benton
1966	"I'll Go Crazy"	82	More Merv Benton
1966	"Who'll Be Next in Line"	94	non-album single
1967	"Do It Again but a Little Bit Slower"	—	non-album single
1967	"Too Many Fish in the Sea"	—	non-album single
1967	"Lovin' up a Storm"	—	non-album single
"—" denotes a recording that did not chart or was not released in that territory.

== Recommended reading ==
- Mittelhauser, Dean (1999). "Merv Benton". Let's Meet. No. 5. Moonlight Publishing.
