= Johnny Chester =

Australian singer-songwriter (born 1941)

- Born: John Howard Chester; 26 December 1941 (age 84); Melbourne, Australia
- Genres: Rock'n'roll, country
- Occupations: Musician, TV presenter, radio announcer
- Instrument: Vocals
- Years active: 1959–present
- Labels: W&G; Fable; Bullet; RCA; Image; WEA; J&B
- Website: johnnychester.com

John Howard Chester (born 26 December 1941) is an Australian singer-songwriter, who started his career in October 1959 with a group known as The Jaywoods, singing rock music and in 1969, changed to country music. He toured nationally with the Beatles, Roy Orbison, the Everly Brothers, Kenny Rogers, Johnny Cash, Tammy Wynette and Charley Pride. During his career, he has led various groups including Johnny Chester and The Chessmen, Johnny Chester and Jigsaw, Johnny Chester and Hotspur. With Jigsaw, he had five top 30 hit singles, "Gwen (Congratulations)" (1971), "Shame and Scandal", "Midnight Bus" (both 1972), "World's Greatest Mum" (No. 9, 1973) and "She's My Kind of Woman" (1974).

Chester hosted various TV series: Teen Time on Ten (GLV-10, Gippsland, 1963–64), Teen Scene (ABC TV, 1964–65) and Country Road (ABC TV, 1977–78). He also worked as a radio announcer on commercial Melbourne radio station 3UZ and ABC Radio Australia.

He wrote a musical comedy, Rebound, that opened in Wagga Wagga. Chester won Golden Guitars at the Country Music Awards of Australia for best-selling track in 1975 and for Male Vocalist of the Year in 1981, 1982 and 1983. In 1994, he was awarded the Songmaker of the Year Award from the Tamworth Songwriters Association. According to Australian rock music historian Ian McFarlane, he is "one of Melbourne's first and best rock'n'roll singers of the early 1960s." Music journalist Ed Nimmervoll acknowledges Chester's "essential inclusion on any major national rock package coming into Melbourne" and later he "helped bring Australian country music to pop respectability."

== Biography ==
John Howard Chester was born on 26 December 1941 and grew up in Melbourne's suburb of Preston. His father, Jack, was a mechanic who had a garage in Carlton, and his mother was Norma. He has two younger sisters, Jill (born ca.1945) and Margaret (born ca. 1951). Chester attended North Fitzroy Primary School, Tyler Street Preston Primary School and Bell Primary, and followed with Preston Technical School. At the age of 14, he left school and worked as a brake specialist for his father. From the age of six, he learned to play the drums and guitar.

In October 1959, Chester formed a band, The Jaywoods, and organised dances at a West Preston church hall: "I could play the guitar ... but I was pretty useless at it. So I started singing–and the kids seemed to like my voice ... We used to get about 200 kids to these dances ... We had an old amplifier that distorted everything, but we thought we were mighty". His idols were Elvis Presley, Buddy Holly, Eddie Cochran, Gene Vincent and locally Johnny O'Keefe. Music journalist, Ed Nimmervoll, noted "without really trying the Jaywoods' rehearsals were attracting a crowd to St. Cecilia's Hall in West Preston, which turned into regular Saturday night dance". By 1960, The Jaywoods became Johnny Chester and The Chessmen, with Chester on lead vocals, Jeff Cason on Upright Acoustic Double bass, Huey Fry on lead guitar, Albert Stacpool on piano, Les Stacpool on saxophone, and Len Woodhouse on drums. The following year, the line-up was Bert Stacpool, Les Stacpool (then on guitar), Frank McMahon on bass guitar, and Graeme Trottman on drums.

Chester was also backed by The Thunderbirds, which were an instrumental group formed in 1957, and by the end of 1960, consisted of Henri Bource on saxophone and flute, Harold Frith on drums, Charles Gauld on guitar, Gordon Onley on bass guitar and Murray Robertson on piano. Both backing bands maintained independent careers, released their own material and backed other artists. In April 1961, Chester's first stadium performance was supporting Connie Francis and Johnny Burnette.

One of his early fans was radio DJ, Stan Rofe, who promoted the artist on the 3KZ program, Platter Parade. Rofe was highly supportive and introduced Chester to W&G Record's Ron Tudor. Chester signed with the label and issued his debut single, "Hokey Pokey", in May 1961 with backing by The Thunderbirds. The track became a top 10 hit in Melbourne. His second single, "Can Can Ladies", appeared in July and reached the local top 5 in July. In January 1962, a third single backed by The Thunderbirds, a cover of "Shakin' All Over", reached No. 4. Johnny Chester and The Chessmen toured to Brisbane and Hobart but had a less popularity in Sydney.

From 1962 to 1964, his next eight singles for W&G were all recorded with backing by The Chessmen. Of these, the highest charting was a cover version of Cochran's "Summertime Blues", which appeared at No. 6 in December 1962. He had also issued his debut album, Wild and Warm in 1963 and two extended plays, Johnny Chester's Hit Parade and My Blues and I, with W&G. In February that year, he took over as host of Teen Time on Ten, on the regional Gippsland channel GLV-10. Australian Women's Weekly's Ainslie Baker declared he had "proved himself an easy, friendly talker" and predicted this could lead to his "having Melbourne's first teenage TV show".

In June 1964, Chester supported the Australian tour by The Beatles with his backing by The Phantoms. According to Chester, "my only worry is that I mightn't live up to this honour and obligation to give the kids a good performance". He was disappointed that The Chessmen were unavailable for the 19 gigs, through state capitals and to New Zealand, "As all the boys have day jobs ... they would not be able to get the time off". The Phantoms were another instrumental group, which had formed in 1960, and by 1964, had the line-up of Alan Fenton on drums, Bob Garde on rhythm guitar, Dave Lincoln on lead guitar, and Pete Watson on bass guitar. From October for two seasons, Chester was the host of the ABC TV program, Teen Scene, with The Chessmen as the resident band.

He recorded further material for W&G on their sub-label, In Records, but none charted, and by mid-1966, he parted with the W&G and The Chessmen. Retaining Bert Stacpool, he formed the Johnny Chester Four with Johnny Marco on guitar and Tom Vigushin on bass guitar. As well as maintaining his musical career, Chester was a DJ for eight years on Melbourne radio station, 3UZ. In May 1968, Chester joined a new backing band, Jigsaw, with Fenton, Ray Eames on lead guitar (ex-Tony Worsley and the Fabulous Blue Jays), Ron Gilby on rhythm guitar, Dennis Tucker on bass guitar (both Merv Benton and the Tamlas), and later in 1968, they toured Vietnam performing for the Australian and American Forces. Jigsaw also had an independent career. Chester's last pop single, "Heaven Help the Man", appeared in 1968 on Astor Records. According to Australian rock music historian Ian McFarlane, Chester is "one of Melbourne's first and best rock'n'roll singers of the early 1960s". Music journalist, author and historian, Ed Nimmervoll, felt that in the early 1960s, Chester was an "essential inclusion on any major national rock package coming into Melbourne", and during the 1970s he "helped bring Australian country music to pop respectability".

In 1969, Chester's first two country music singles, "Green Green" and "Highway 31", were issued on Phillips Records. Johnny Chester and Jigsaw signed to Fable Records, owned by Tudor (ex-W&G Records). Fenton died in an industrial accident during the construction of the South Eastern Freeway in Melbourne and was replaced on drums by Eddie Chapel. At about that time, Eames was replaced by Jon Calderwood. In August 1970, Jigsaw, without Chester, had a number-one hit with a cover version of United Kingdom group, Christie's "Yellow River". It was co-credited with Sydney-based band Autumn, which also covered the track. With Chester, Jigsaw had five hit singles on the Go-Set National Top 40: "Gwen (Congratulations)" (No. 26, October 1971), "Shame and Scandal" (No. 13, February 1972), "Midnight Bus" (No. 25, December), "The World's Greatest Mum" (No. 9, August 1973) and "She's My Kind of Woman" (No. 19, June 1974).

Chester won Golden Guitars at the Country Music Awards of Australia for best-selling track in 1975. In 1977, he toured nationally, backed by the Blue Denim Country Band, and also compered Country Road for ABC-TV. In 1979, he formed Hotspur and continued to issue country music singles and albums into the 1980s. From 1981 to 1983, at three successive Tamworth Country Music Festivals, he won Male Vocalist of the Year. In 1994, he was awarded the Songmaker of the Year Award from the Tamworth Songwriters Association.

=== Personal life ===
In October 1964, Johnny Chester married Larraine "Liz" Isbister (born ca. 1944), a stenographer. Liz had attended the same primary school and their grandparents were neighbours. The couple had begun dating in September 1959, at the Royal Melbourne Show. Chester lived in Greensborough, Victoria, for eighteen years during the 1970s and 1980s. As of October 2012, they have three daughters and eight grandchildren and live in Rosebud.

== Discography ==
=== Studio albums ===
Title	Details
Wild and Warm	Released: 1963; Label: W&G (WG-B-1545)
Going Places (Just for Fun) (with Jigsaw)	Released: November 1972; Label: Fable (FBSA025)
For the World's Greatest Mum	Released: 1974; Label: Fable (FBAB5306)
Greensborough Music	Released: 1975; Label: Fable (FBSA-046)
...Into Country	Released: 1976; Label: Bullet (BLT-12-001)
Johnny Chester	Released: 1978; Label: Image (ILP794)
Johnny Chester and Hotspur (with Hotspur)	Released: 1980; Label: WEA (600069)
Love in the Meantime (with Hotspur)	Released: 1981; Label: WEA (600105)
From Under the Influence	Released: 1983; Label: WEA (250179-1)
Some Such Foolishness	Released: 1985; Label: RCA Victor (VPL1-0496)
Side X Side (with Donna Fisk)	Released: 1985; Label: RCA Victor (VPL1-0535)
There's a Shadow on the Moon Tonight	Released: 1986; Label: RCA Victor (VPL1-0611)
Waiting for the Lightning	Released: 1992; Label: HomeSpun
Among My Souvenirs	Released: 1998; Label: Rich River Records (HSLP.001)
Listen	Released: 1998; Label: Josalado (MR 60232); Producer: Michael Cristiano
Get a Little Dirt on Your Hands	Released: 2005; Label: Shock Records (DR002)

=== Soundtracks albums ===
Title	Details
Country Salute	Released: November 1978; Label: RCA Australia (VAL1-0179); From the ABC Series Country Road

=== Compilation albums ===
Title	Details	Peak chart positions
Title	Details	AUS
The Best of Ches! (as Johnny Chester and The Chessmen)	Released: 1963; Label: W&G (33 MSX 6047)	-
Sings His Greatest Hits	Released: 1965; Label: W&G (WG-25/2340)	-
Johnny Chester & Jigsaw (with Jigsaw)	Released: 1971; Label: Fable (FBSA-013)	-
The Best of Johnny Chester	Released: 1973; Label: Fable (FBSA-040)	-
My Kinda Country	Released: September 1980; Label: Velvet Records (VLT 012)	52
The Hits of Johnny Chester	Released: 1983; Label: J&B Records (JB 158)	61
She's My Kind of Woman	Released: 1984; Label: Axis (AX 260302)	-
So Far So Good	Released: 1987; Label: J&B Records (JB 301)	-
Favourites Old And New	Released: 1989; Label: Rich River (HSLP 003)	-
Portrait	Released: 1992; Label: Axis (7017782)	-
Johnny Chester Collection	Released: 1992; Label: Castle (PCD10153)	-
Songmaker Vol One	Released: 1995; Label: Castle (CCACD 133)	-
The Best of Johnny Chester	Released: 1997; Label: Fable (72438148612 2)	-
Rocker 1961-1966	Released: 2002; Label: ScreenSound Australia (CD/SSA/3C0026)	-

== Extended plays ==
Title	Details
A 4 on 1 Super Disc (With The Thunderbirds)	Released: 1961; Label: W&G (WG-S-1274)
Hit Parade (With The Thunderbirds)	Released: 1962; Label: W&G (WG-E-1360)
My Blues and I (With The Thunderbirds)	Released: 1963; Label: W&G (WG-E-1661)
Johnny Chester	Released: 1973; Label: Fable (FBEP 165)
My Ding a Ling	Released: 1974; Label: Fable (FBEP 216)

== Singles ==
Year	Title	Peak chart positions
Year	Title	KMR
1961	"That's How It's Gonna Be" / "Hokey Pokey (With The Thunderbirds)"	28
1961	"Can Can Ladies" / "What a Night (With The Thunderbirds)"	20
1962	"California Sun" / "Shakin' All Over (With The Thunderbirds)"	25
1962	"Shy Away" / "A Funny Little Feeling"	71
1962	"Let's Dance"	44
1962	"Summertime Blues"	30
1963	"Nick Nack Paddy Whack" / "Butterflies"	44
1963	"Come on Everybody" / "The Old Copper Kettle"	44
1963	"Teeny"	28
1964	"Bye Bye Johnny" / "Miss Ann"	93
1964	"Unless You Care"	65
1965	"Your Cheatin' Heart"	—
1965	"When Will I Be Loved"	—
1965	"Something's Got a Hold on Me"	92
1965	"Steppin' Out"	—
1968	"Heaven Help the Man"	—
1969	"Green Green"	—
1969	"Highway 31"	57
"—" denotes a recording that did not chart or was not released in that territory.

Year	Title	Peak chart positions	
Year	Title	Go-Set	KMR
1970	"If Only I Could Leave You"	—	—
1970	"Kawliga"	—	—
1971	"Glory Glory (I'll Be Back to See the Storey Bridge)"	46	47
1971	"Gwen (Congratulations)"	26	19
1971	"Shame and Scandal (in the Family)"	13	13
1972	"Readymix Revenge"	—	37
1972	"Midnight Bus"	25	31
1973	"The World's Greatest Mum"	9	8
1973	"Let's Build a Love Together"	—	43
1974	"She's My Kind of Woman"	19	14
1974	"My Special Angel"	—	76
1975	"Sally on Sunday"	—	88
1975	"The One in the Middle of Lonely"	—	—
1976	"She's Gone to Someone Else's Arms"	—	—
1976	"My China Doll"	—	—
1977	"Lonely Women Make Good Lovers"	—	100
1978	"It'll Be Me"	—	—
1979	"Lord I'd Forgotten"	—	95
1979	"I Love You So Rebecca"	—	33
"—" denotes a recording that did not chart or was not released in that territory.

Year	Title	Peak chart positions
Year	Title	KMR
1980	"I Walked Out of Blacktown"	—
1980	"She's Been Gone Much Too Long"	—
1980	"All on Your Own"	—
1981	"My Ding-a-Ling"	50
1981	"Love in the Meantime"	—
1982	"Rough Around the Edges"	99
1982	"You Bring out the Devil in Me"	—
1982	"An Ad in The Weekly Times"	—
1983	"When My Blue Moon Turns to Gold Again"	—
1983	"Country Girl"	—
1984	"('Til) I Kissed You"	—
1984	"Let's Make Tomorrow's Memories Tonight"	—
1985	"Some Such Foolishness"	—
1985	"Willie Sing One with Me"	—
1986	"My Sweet Janie"	—
1986	"There's a Shadow on the Moon Tonight"	—
"—" denotes a recording that did not chart or was not released in that territory.

== Awards and nominations ==
=== ARIA Music Awards ===
The ARIA Music Awards is a set of annual ceremonies presented by the Australian Recording Industry Association (ARIA), which recognise excellence, innovation, and achievement across all genres of the music of Australia. They commenced in 1987.

Year	Nominee / work	Award	Result	Ref.
1987	There's a Shadow on the Moon Tonight	Best Country Album	Nominated	

=== Country Music Awards of Australia ===
The Country Music Awards of Australia (also known as the Golden Guitar Awards and originally named Australasian Country Music Awards) is an annual awards night held in January during the Tamworth Country Music Festival, in Tamworth, New South Wales, celebrating recording excellence in the Australian country music industry. Chester has won four awards (wins only).

Year	Nominee / work	Award	Result
1975	"My Kind of Woman"	Top Selling Track	Won
1981	"I Love You So Rebecca"	Male Vocalist of the Year	Won
1982	"Rough Around the Edges"	Male Vocalist of the Year	Won
1983	"Ad in the Weekly Times"	Male Vocalist of the Year	Won

=== Tamworth Songwriters Awards ===
The Tamworth Songwriters Association (TSA) is an annual songwriting contest for original country songs, awarded in January at the Tamworth Country Music Festival. They commenced in 1986.

Year	Nominee / work	Award	Result (wins only)
1994	Johnny Chester	Songmaker Award	awarded
