= ARIA Achievement Awards =

ARIA Achievement Awards and Icon Awards
- Country: Australia
- Presented by: Australian Recording Industry Association (ARIA)
- First award: 1989
- Website: ariaawards.com.au

The ARIA Achievement Awards and ARIA Icon Awards, are awards presented periodically at the annual ARIA Music Awards, which recognise "the many achievements of Aussie artists across all music genres", and are "awarded at the discretion of the ARIA Board." They are handed out by the Australian Recording Industry Association (ARIA), an organisation whose aim is "to advance the interests of the Australian record industry." The awards listed below are given periodically to Australian-based artists or industry personnel within the categories: ARIA Outstanding Achievement Awards (first presented in 1988), ARIA Special Achievement Awards (first in 1989), ARIA Lifetime Achievement Awards (first in 1991), ARIA Icon Awards (first in 2013) and ARIA Global Impact Award (first in 2025 ARIA Music Awards).

== Awardees ==
=== Outstanding Achievement ===
In the following table, the awardee is highlighted in colour.

Awardees marked in colour

Year	Awardee(s)
1988 (2nd)	John Farnham
1989 (3rd)	INXS
1990 (4th)	Kylie Minogue
1991 (5th)	Midnight Oil
1996 (10th)	Silverchair
1997 (11th)	Peter Andre
1998 (12th)	Savage Garden
1999 (13th)	Natalie Imbruglia
2000 (14th)	Slim Dusty
2000 (14th)	Tina Arena
2001 (15th)	Keith Urban
2002 (16th)	Kylie Minogue
2003 (17th)	The Wiggles
2015 (29th)	Lee Kernaghan

=== Special Achievement ===
In the following table, the awardee is highlighted in colour.

Awardee marked in colour

Year	Awardee(s)
1989 (3rd)	Kylie Minogue
1992 (6th)	Michael Gudinski
1992 (6th)	Mushroom Records
1993 (7th)	Ian "Molly" Meldrum
1994 (8th)	Stan Rofe
1996 (10th)	Slim Dusty
1997 (11th)	Charles Fisher
1999 (13th)	Bill Armstrong
1999 (13th)	Ron Tudor
2000 (14th)	Daryl Somers

=== Lifetime Achievement ===
In the following table, the awardee is highlighted in colour.

Awardee marked in colour

Year	Awardee(s)
1991 (5th)	Ted Albert
2007 (21st)	John Woodruff
2008 (22nd)	John Laws

=== Icon Awards ===
In the following table, the awardee is highlighted in colour.

Awardee marked in colour

Year	Awardee(s)
2013 (27th)	Michael Gudinski
2014 (28th)	~~Denis Handlin~~ (Note: In October 2021 the Board of ARIA withdrew Handlin's award amid "multiple allegations of toxic culture" at Sony Australia while he was CEO.)
2016 (30th)	Sebastian Chase
2017 (31st)	Roger Davies
2019 (33rd)	Michael Chugg

=== Global Impact Awards ===
In the following table, the awardee is highlighted in colour.

Awardee marked in colour

Year	Awardee(s)
2025 (39th)	Dom Dolla
2026 (40th)	Tame Impala
