= The Love Moth =

Single by Liv Maessen

from the album Liv Maessen
- Released: December 1969
- Genre: Pop
- Length: 2:38
- Label: Polydor NH 539122

Liv Maessen singles chronology
"The Love Moth" (1969)	"Knock, Knock Who's There?" (1970)

The Love Moth was the debut single by Australian singer Liv Maessen. The single was released on Polydor label in December 1969. It entered the Melbourne charts in January 1970, staying in for eighteen weeks and peaking at #8, and it scraped into the bottom of the Go-Set national Top 40 for one week in April 1970 at #40.

"The Love Moth" is an English-language version of "La Pioggia" ("the rain"), an Italian song first performed by Gigliola Cinquetti at the 1969 San Remo Music Festival and recorded by her in the same year. It was also performed in French at the same festival by France Gall, as "L'orage". Gall also released a Spanish version, "La Lluvia" (1969).

Chart (1970)	Peak position
Go-Set Australian National Charts	40
Melbourne	8
