= Mademoiselle Ninette =

"Mademoiselle Ninette" is a song written and produced by Herbert Hildebrandt-Winhauer and originally performed by Soulful Dynamics. It was released in 1970, and became a number-one hit in Germany, Austria and Switzerland that year and was among the bestsellers for 30 weeks. More than half million copies were sold of the single. a cover by Michael Holm reached number two in South Africa.

== Cover versions ==
Several other bands and singers recorded the song, among them:

- The Walkers (in Dutch)
- Michael Holm (1970 in English and in German - South Africa #2)
- James Last (1970)
- Las Ventanas (Mexican band) (1970, In Spanish)
- Hajo (1970, in German)
- Metronom (in Czech)
- Jigsaw (1972 - Australia #18)
- De Marlets (1988)
- Rondo Classico (1995)
- Sam Gooris (1996)
- Matthias Lens (2013)

=== Charts performance ===
Chart (1970)	Peak position
Argentina (CAPIF)	9
Austria (Ö3 Austria Top 40)	1
Belgium (Ultratop 50 Flanders)	1
Belgium (Ultratop 50 Wallonia)	4
France (IFOP)	32
Netherlands (Single Top 100)	7
Netherlands (Dutch Top 40)	7
Switzerland (Schweizer Hitparade)	1
West Germany (GfK)	1
