= Liv Maessen =

Australian pop singer

- Origin: Melbourne, Victoria, Australia
- Genres: Pop, country
- Occupation: Entertainer
- Instrument: Vocals
- Years active: 1969–1974
- Labels: Polydor, Fable

Liv Maessen is an Australian pop singer who had hits in the early 1970s with "The Love Moth", "Knock, Knock Who's There?" and "Snowbird". In 1969, Maessen had finished second in the New Faces talent show. Her prize included a recording contract with Ron Tudor's Fable Records which released her albums, Live for Life (1971) and Best of Liv Maessen (1974). She won the 1971 Logie Award for 'Best New Talent'. In the Go-Set Pop Poll, Maessen was voted in the top 5 as most popular female vocalist in both 1970 and 1971. For her single "Knock, Knock Who's There?", Maessen became the first Australian female artist to be awarded a gold record certificate. After her recording career, Maessen turned to cabaret and club work by the mid-1970s.

== Biography ==
In 1969 Maessen finished second on the series final of the TV talent show New Faces. Maessen was a mother of two children from Melbourne and signed with Ron Tudor's production company. In December, Maessen released her debut single, "The Love Moth", which was an English-language cover version of an Italian song, "La Pioggia", by Gigliola Cinquetti. Maessen's version reached the Go-Set National Top 40 in April 1970 and was a top 10 hit in Melbourne. Maessen also appeared on local TV shows.

Maessen's second pop single, "Knock, Knock Who's There?", was a cover version of Mary Hopkin's entry in the 1970 Eurovision Song Contest. It was released on Fable Records in April 1970 and peaked at No. 2, co-charting with Hopkin's version. Due to the 1970 radio ban, a major dispute between commercial radio stations and record companies, Hopkin's version was not well known to Australian listeners. "Knock, Knock Who's There?" finished third on Go-Set's Top Records for the Year of 1970 and was the highest placed by an Australian artist. Maessen became the first Australian female artist to be awarded a gold record certificate for a single with sales of over 50,000. She won the 1971 George Wallace Memorial Logie for Best New Talent and in the Go-Set Pop Poll was voted in the top five as most popular female vocalist.

Maesson's third single, "Snowbird", was a country pop hit for Canadian singer Anne Murray. It was issued in August 1970 and peaked at No. 16. In March 1971 Maessen released her fourth single, "Hurry on Down", which did not chart. In mid-1971 she was again voted in the top five as most popular female vocalist by Go-Set readers. Her debut album, Live for Life, appeared in July with another single, "Here I Go Again", in October. She released "Love Is for the Two of Us" late in 1971, which was a duet with TV personality Jimmy Hannan. Two further singles followed in 1972 and her last commercial release, in 1974, was "Hey Mama, Sing Me a Song", composed by Miki Gavrielov, an Israeli singer song writer. After her recording career, Maessen turned to cabaret and club work in the mid-1970s.

== Discography ==
=== Albums ===
Title	Details	Peak chart positions
Title	Details	AUS
Live for Life	Released: July 1971; Label: Fable Records (FBSA-009); Format: LP	30
Best of Liv Maessen	Released: December 1974; Label: Fable Records (FBAB-5303); Format: CD, digital download, streaming	-

=== Extended plays ===
Title	Details
Liv Maessen	Released: January 1973; Label: Fable Records (FBEP 158); Format: LP
Knock, Knock Who's There?	Released: January 1973; Label: Fable Records (FBEP 1); Format: LP

=== Singles ===
Year	Single	Peak chart positions	Certifications	Album
Year	Single	Go-Set Australian National Charts	Certifications	Album
1969	"The Love Moth"	40		Live for Life
1970	"Knock, Knock Who's There?"	2	AUS: Gold	Live for Life
1970	"Snowbird"	13		Live for Life
1971	"Hurry on Down"	93		Live for Life
1971	"Here I Go Again"	–		Live for Life
1971	"Love Is for the Two of Us" (with Jimmy Hannan)	–		non album single
1972	"New Love Day"	–		The Best Of Liv Maessen
1972	"Everybody's Reaching Out for Somebody"	–		The Best Of Liv Maessen
1972	"A Taste of Honey"	–		The Best Of Liv Maessen
1974	"Hey Mama, Sing Me a Song"	–		non album single

=== Other appearances ===
- "Little Green Apples", "A New Love Day" on Channel 9 'New Faces' Discoveries by Various Artists (Fable Records, 1970)

== Awards and nominations ==
=== Go-Set Pop Poll ===
The Go-Set Pop Poll was coordinated by teen-oriented pop music newspaper, Go-Set and was established in February 1966 and conducted an annual poll during 1966 to 1972 of its readers to determine the most popular personalities.

Year	Nominee / work	Award	Result
1970	herself	Girl Vocal	4th
1971	herself	Best Girl Vocal	2nd
