= Soulful Dynamics =

Liberian band

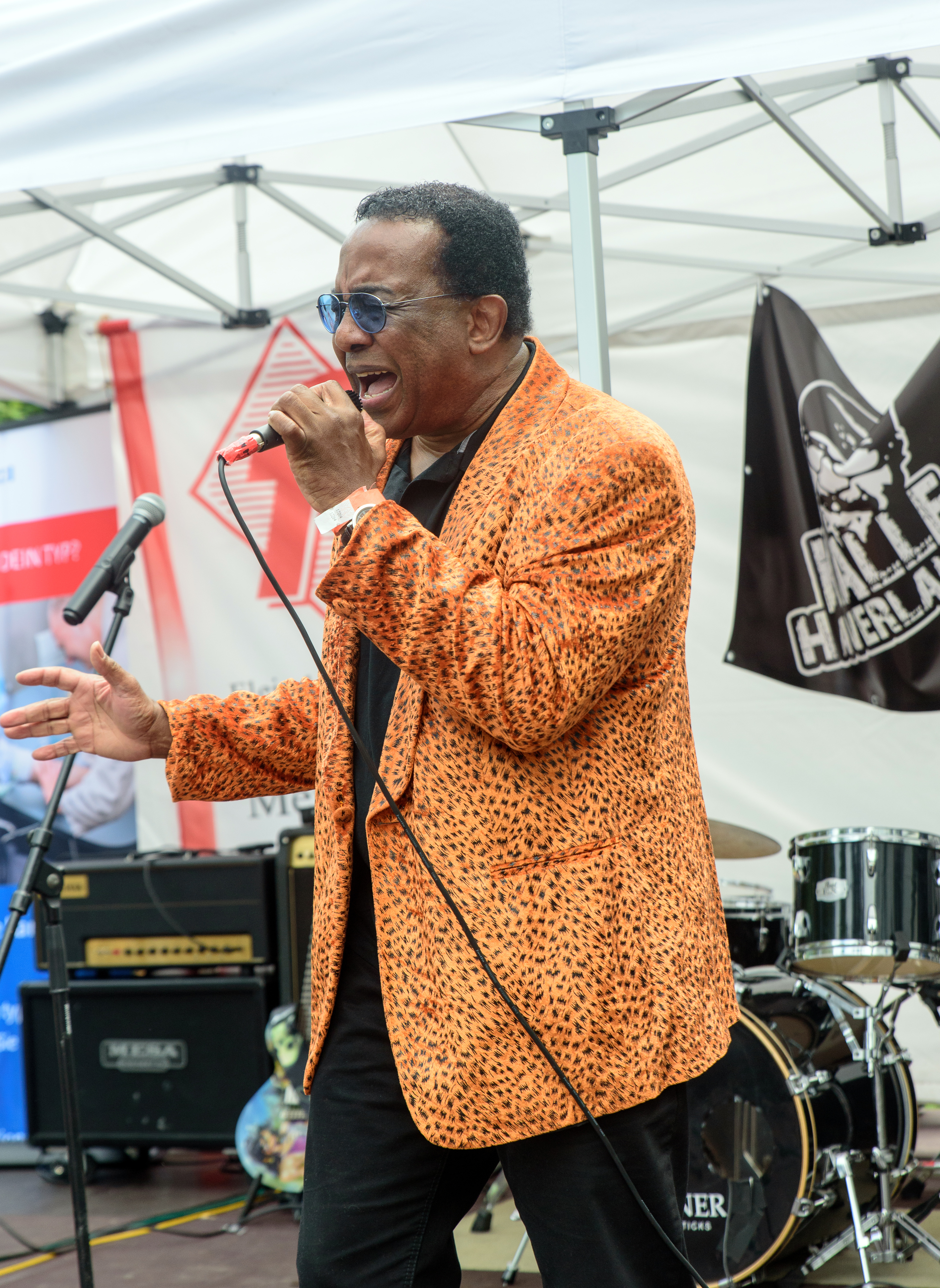
Ernest Clinton at Bikers Blood for Help in Hamburg (2016)

Soulful Dynamics are a band that was formed in Liberia in 1965, and arrived in Hamburg in 1969. They are best known for their 1970 hit song "Mademoiselle Ninette". Their other hits include: "Annabelle", "Birdie", "Saah-Saah-Kumba-Kumba" and "Coconuts from Congoville".

== History ==
Originally from Liberia, they relocated to Hamburg. Soon after they recorded "Mademoiselle Ninette". By June 1970, their song was #1 in West Germany and Switzerland and #2 in Austria as recorded by Billboard. In September of that year, they had their African Fire album released which included the songs "Soy", "Down In The Dumps", "Defaliant", "Maria Shanta" and "Babalazi".

In 1976, along with Dorthe, Sonny Worthing, Catherine Ferry, Guru-Guru and the Bourbon Skiffle Company, they played at the finale of a sales convention in Kiel, Germany.

=== Emanuel Obedekah ===
Emanuel Obedekah released several solo singles. One was "Romeo" bw "Mama Don't Go" in 1971. Another was "Oh Balutujeh" bw "Let Summer Come Again" in 1972.

== Members ==
- Emanuel Obedekah (vocals)
- Frederik "Andy" Anderson (guitar, vocals)
- Ernest J.G. Clinton (guitar, vocals)
- Manfred "Maxi" Free (guitar)
- Benjamin "Ben" Mason (drums)
- Olu Igenuma (keyboard)
- Molley Morgan (E-bass, percussions)

=== Later members ===
- Alhaj A. Azziz a.k.a. Leo Chesson

== Discography ==
=== Singles ===
- 1970 "Annabella / Mr. Reggaeman"
- 1970 "Birdie / Louisiana Race"
- 1970 "Mademoiselle Ninette / Monkey"
- 1971 "Saah-Saah-Kumba-Kumba / All Together"
- 1972 "Coconuts aus Congoville / Azumba"
- 1972 "Coconuts from Congoville / Azumba"
- 1972 "Nie-Siah / Devil's Touch"
- 1973 "Funny Funny Monkey / Gama Gama Gooshy"
- 1973 "Lady from Amsterdam / Zon-Gele-Zor"
- 1974 "Malakatra / Doctor Man"
- 1974 "My Rockin' Lady"
- 1974 "Sweet Honeybee / Uncle Joe"
- 1975 "Crying Man"
- 1975 "Mademoiselle Ninette / Annabella"
- 1976 "Jungle People"
- 1977 "Mirabelle"
- 1977 "Shake Shake Shake / Wanna Love You"
- 1982 "Dying Snowman / Tumba Tumba"

=== LPs ===
- 1970 African Fire
- 1971 Soulful Dynamics
- 1973 Live Im Studio
- 1977 Jungle People
- 1977 Soulful
