= The Mixtures =

Australian pop band

- Origin: Melbourne, Australia
- Genres: Pop, pop rock
- Years active: 1965–1976
- Label: EMI/HMV
- Past members: see Members below

The Mixtures were an Australian pop group, which formed in 1965. They had two number-one hits in Australia with their cover version of Mungo Jerry's "In the Summertime" and its follow-up, "The Pushbike Song", in 1970 and 1971, respectively. The latter also reached No. 2 in the United Kingdom and appeared on the United States Billboard Hot 100. They had another top ten hit with "Captain Zero" in late 1971. Members during the early 1970s included Mick Flinn on bass guitar and vocals, Idris Jones on lead vocals and Fred Wieland on guitar (who died in 2018). The group disbanded in 1976.

== 1965–1976: The Mixtures ==
The Mixtures were formed in Melbourne in 1965 as a beat pop trio by Laurie Arthur on vocals and guitar (ex-the Strangers), John Creech on drums and vocals and Rod De Clerk on vocals and bass guitar. Melbourne-born vocalist Terry Dean had met De Clerk while holidaying in Tasmania earlier in that year. Once back in Melbourne, Dean introduced De Clerk to Arthur and Creech. The trio of Arthur, Creech and De Clerk undertook a jam session and formed the first version of the Mixtures. They were signed to EMI/HMV that same year and released three singles by March 1967. In that year the line-up briefly expanded to a five-piece with Dennis Garcia joining on organ and Fred Wieland on guitar. De Clerk was replaced on bass guitar by Mick Flinn, Garcia left without replacement and Idris Jones (ex-the Gingerbread Men) took over lead vocals from departing Arthur. Arthur became their manager.

They went through further line-up changes over the following years, then signed to CBS Records in 1969. Jones became ill and was briefly replaced on lead vocals by former solo pop singer, Buddy England, who was replaced by the returning Jones by March 1970. Further singles followed before transferring to Fable Records in mid-year. The Mixtures recorded a cover of Mungo Jerry's song, "In the Summertime", which was issued in July. During recording Idris Jones declined lead vocals as it was too "poppy", hence bass guitarist, Flinn sang lead instead. As a result of the 1970 radio ban, during which most Australian commercial radio stations refused to play Australian and British popular music released by major labels, the Mixtures rendition received much more airplay than the original. The single went to number one in Australia for six weeks. They followed up with "The Pushbike Song" (produced by David Mackay), which also went to number one in Australia, for two weeks. It hit number two in the UK Singles Chart, and reached No. 44 on the Billboard Hot 100 in the United States after being released on Sire Records. "The Pushbike Song" had been written by Idris Jones with his brother Evan Jones.

With the commercial success in the UK, the Mixtures travelled there in January 1971 with two new members – Idris Jones had been replaced by Greg Cook on vocals and guitar, while Mick Holden replaced Howard on drums. Idris returned in April for another short stint but left again when Peter Williams replaced him on vocals and guitar. The group's next single, "Henry Ford", peaked at No. 43 in Australia. More line-up changes ensued before "Captain Zero" reached No. 6 in Australia in 1971, their last top ten hit. It was written by Finn and Williams. English artist Brian Eno had guested on synthesiser for "Captain Zero". They returned to Australia late that year, where they toured in November.

The group underwent considerable line-up changes and including latter day members Brenton Fosdike (guitar, vocals) and John Petcovich (drums, vocals) joining with the last member to join being keyboardist, Rob Scott. Their final single, "Skateboard Jive" / "Come Together for the Games" (1975) appeared and the group disbanded in 1976.

== 1977–present: Post the Mixtures ==
In 1978 the band travelled to Perth to do some recording and put together a new show. During this time bass player Chris Spooner died in a fishing accident at Trigg Beach. The band only carried on for a further three months as a four-piece before breaking up in early 1979. The remaining four members, Fosdike, Petcovich, Scott and Peter Williams, then formed a new band, BRIX with two other Australians, (Dennis Broad and Paul Reynolds).

Fred Wieland, whose tenure with the Mixtures had led to an appearance in the UK TV programme, Never Mind the Buzzcocks, died of lung cancer in Spain in December 2018, aged 75.

== Members ==
- Laurie Arthur – guitar, vocals (1965–67)
- John Creech – drums, vocals (1965–70)
- Rod De Clerk – bass guitar, vocals (1965–67)
- Alan "Edgell" James – bass guitar (1966)
- Dennis Garcia – organ (1967)
- Fred Wieland – guitar (1967–76), died 2018
- Mick Flinn – bass guitar (1967–72)
- Idris Jones – lead vocals (1967–69; 1970; 1971)
- Buddy England – vocals (1969–70)
- Greg Cook – guitar, vocals (1970–71)
- Clive Moore – guitar (1970)
- Gary Howard – drums (1970–71)
- Peter Williams – vocals, guitar (1971–76)
- Mick Holden – drums (1971)
- Don Lebler – drums (1971–76)
- Chris Spooner – bass guitar (1972–76)
- Brenton Fosdike – vocals, guitar
- John Petcovich – vocals, drums
- Rob Scott – keyboards, vocals

== Discography ==
=== Studio albums ===
Title	Album details
In the Summertime	Released: 1970; Format: LP; Label: Fable (FBSA-003)
The Mixtures	Released: 1974; Format: LP; Label: Festival Records (L 25184)

=== Compilations albums ===
Title	Album details
The Best of The Mixtures	Released: 1972; Format: LP; Label: Fable (FBSA 017)
The Push-Bike Song	Released: 1996; Format: CD; Label: Fable / EMI (8531912)
The Best of The Mixtures	Released: 2018; Format: CD, download; Label: Fable / Sony Music (19075829802)

=== Singles ===
Year	Single	Peak positions			Album
Year	Single	AUS	UK	US	Album
1966	"I've Been Wrong" / "Koko Joe"	—	—	—	Non-album singles
1966	"Come On Out" / "Lose Your Money"	—	—	—	Non-album singles
1967	"Music, Music, Music" / "(They Call the Wind) Maria"	57	—	—	Non-album singles
1969	"Sad Old Song" / "Never Trust in Tomorrow"	—	—	—	Non-album singles
1969	"Here Comes Love Again" / "Fancy Meeting You Here"	66	—	—	Non-album singles
1970	"Call Me Do" / "Ten Thousand Children"	—	—	—	In the Summertime
1970	"In the Summertime" / "Where You Are"	1	—	—	In the Summertime
1970	"The Pushbike Song" / "Who Loves Ya"	1	2	44	In the Summertime
1971	"Henry Ford" / "Home Away from Home"	43	—	—	The Best of the Mixtures
1971	"Never Be Untrue" / "She's Gone Away"	—	—	—	The Best of the Mixtures
1971	"Captain Zero" / "I Wanna Go Home"	6	—	—	The Best of the Mixtures
1972	"Guitar Song" / "I've Found Out Where It's At"	—	—	—	Non-album singles
1973	"Dazzle Easy, Diane" / "Found Out Where It's At"	—	—	—	Non-album singles
1973	"My Home On the Murrumbidgee" / "Slow Train"	—	—	—	Non-album singles
1974	"Love Is Life"	—	—	—	Non-album singles
1974	"Down Under Girls" / "My Neck of the Woods"	—	—	—	The Mixtures
1975	"Skateboard Jive" / "Come Together for the Games"	—	—	—	Non-album single

== See also ==
- List of artists who reached number one on the Australian singles chart
- Long Way to the Top
