= Knock, Knock Who's There? =

1970 song by Mary Hopkin

- Cover of vinyl single

Single by Mary Hopkin
- B-side: "I'm Going to Fall in Love Again"
- Released: March 1970
- Songwriters: John Carter; Geoff Stephens

Eurovision Song Contest 1970 entry
- Country: United Kingdom
- Artist: Mary Hopkin
- Language: English
- Composers: John Carter; Geoff Stephens
- Lyricists: Carter; Stephens
- Conductor: Johnny Arthey

Finals performance
- Final result: 2nd
- Final points: 26

Entry chronology
- ◄ "Boom Bang-a-Bang" (1969)
- "Jack in the Box" (1971) ►

"Knock, Knock Who's There?" is a song written and composed by John Carter and Geoff Stephens, released on Apple Records. It was originally sung and recorded by the Welsh singer Mary Hopkin and represented the United Kingdom in the Eurovision Song Contest 1970, where it came second. The single version was produced by Mickie Most and reached No. 2 on the UK charts.

== Overview ==
On 7 March 1970, Mary Hopkin sang six songs at the UK National Final, A Song for Europe, which was aired on the television series It's Cliff Richard!. Hopkin was chosen by the BBC to be the United Kingdom's representative for that year, and the winner of a postal vote would determine which of the six songs would progress with her to the finals in Amsterdam. "Knock, Knock Who's There?", the sixth and final song performed that evening, won the postal vote with over 120,000 supporters.

At Amsterdam, the song was performed seventh on the night, after France's Guy Bonnet with "Marie-Blanche", and before Luxembourg's David Alexandre Winter with "Je suis tombé du ciel". At the end of judging that evening, "Knock, Knock Who's There?" took the second-place slot with 26 points after Ireland's "All Kinds of Everything", performed by Dana. The UK received points from nine out of a possible eleven voting juries.

The singer expresses a long-held optimism at the prospect of love finally finding her. At the exact point that said optimism has faded, and she has resigned herself to not finding love and companionship, she hears a "knock, knock", which signifies love finally becoming attainable for her. Excited, she beckons love to "come inside" and into her life.

The single was released in March 1970, backed by "I'm Going to Fall in Love Again" (the runner-up in the Song for Europe final) on the B-side. On 28 March 1970, "Knock, Knock Who's There?" entered the UK Singles Chart at No. 7, the highest new entry of the week. It peaked at No. 2 and remained on the chart for 14 weeks. Hopkin's recording wasn't released in the United States as a single at the time, but a version by Andra Willis briefly entered the American easy listening chart, reaching number 40. Hopkin's version was finally released in the US in November 1972, where it floundered for four weeks on the Billboard Hot 100, only reaching a peak of No. 92. In the Netherlands it peaked at No. 3 on the Dutch Top 40 as well as on the Single Top 100.

Rather different from her usual material, Hopkin rarely performed the song after the Eurovision due to her distaste for it. She later commented: "I was so embarrassed about it. Standing on stage singing a song you hate is awful." She also referred to it as humiliating. At the time, she conceded victory gracefully saying that "the best song won" and wished Dana well.

In 1970, a sound-alike cover appeared on the album Top of the Pops, Volume 10.

== Charts ==
=== Weekly charts ===
Chart (1970–1973)	Peak position
Australia (Kent Music Report)	5
Austria	4
Belgium	3
Canada RPM Adult Contemporary	3
Germany	12
Ireland (IRMA)	2
Malaysia	2
The Netherlands	3
New Zealand	1
Poland	3
Singapore	1
South Africa	2
United Kingdom	2
US Billboard Hot 100	92
US Billboard Easy Listening	11
US Cash Box	97
Yugoslavia	3

=== Year-end charts ===
Chart (1970)	Rank
Australia	33
UK	23

== Liv Maessen cover ==
"Knock, Knock Who's There?"

Single by Liv Maessen

from the album Liv Maessen
- B-side: "Just a Little Lovin'"
- Released: April 1970
- Genre: Pop
- Label: Fable FB 005
- Songwriters: John Carter; Geoff Stephens

Liv Maessen singles chronology
"The Love Moth" (1969)	"Knock, Knock Who's There?" (1970)	"Snowbird" (1970)

In Australia, a cover version by Liv Maessen co-charted into the top 10. Maessen's version reached No. 2 on the Australian charts, after her debut single "The Love Moth" only made it to No. 40.

=== Charts ===
Weekly charts

Chart (1970)	Peak position
Go-Set Australian National Charts	2

Year-end charts

Chart (1970)	Rank
Australia	9
