= Yellow River (song) =

Single by Christie

from the album Christie
- B-side: "Down the Mississippi Line"
- Released: 23 April 1970
- Genre: Pop rock
- Length: 2:44
- Label: CBS (UK) Epic (US)
- Songwriter: Jeff Christie
- Producer: Mike Smith

Christie singles chronology
"Yellow River" (1970)	"San Bernadino" (1970)

Music video
- "Yellow River" on YouTube

"Yellow River" is a song written by Jeff Christie and recorded by the British band Christie. It was released in 1970 and became a No. 1 hit song for the band in the UK.

== Background ==
Jeff Christie, the leader of Christie, first offered the song to The Tremeloes. They recorded it with the intention of releasing it as a single at the beginning of 1970. However, after the success of their single, "(Call Me) Number One", the band decided to go in a different direction. Instead of releasing "Yellow River" as the follow-up single, they went with one of their own compositions, "By the Way", which was only a minor Top 40 success.

Producer Mike Smith then took the Tremeloes' vocals off the recording and added Jeff Christie's. Released as a single on 23 April 1970, it became an international hit, reaching number 1 on the UK Singles Chart for one week in June 1970. In the US, it reached number 23 on the Billboard Hot 100.

In the song, the actual location of Yellow River is not specified, although the author, Jeff Christie, is on record as saying that it was inspired by the idea of a soldier going home at the end of the American Civil War. As the song was released during the Vietnam War, it has been interpreted as being about a soldier leaving the U.S. Military at the end of his period of conscription.

=== Personnel ===
- Jeff Christie – lead vocals (Christie release)
- Dave Munden – lead vocals (Tremeloes release), drums
- Rick Westwood – lead guitar
- Alan Blakley – rhythm guitar
- Len Hawkes – bass guitar

== Chart performance ==
=== Weekly charts ===
Christie

Chart (1970)	Peak position
Argentina (CAPIF)	2
Australia (Kent Music Report)	16
Canada RPM Top Singles	33
Finland	1
Germany	2
Ireland (IRMA)	1
Japan	14
Mexico	1
Netherlands (Dutch Top 40)	4
New Zealand (Listener)	2
Norway	1
Switzerland	4
UK Singles Chart	1
U.S. Billboard Hot 100	23

Jigsaw cover

Chart (1970)	Peak position
Australia (Kent Music Report)	5

=== Year-end charts ===
Christie

Chart (1970)	Rank
Australia	96
Germany	9
UK	9
U.S. Billboard Hot 100	83
US (Joel Whitburn's Pop Annual)	161

Jigsaw

Chart (1970)	Rank
Australia	39

== Other versions ==
"Yellow River" has spawned a host of covers by artists as diverse as R.E.M., Leapy Lee, Elton John, The Compton Brothers, Middle of the Road, Chris Rea, Bernd Spier, Doyle Lawson, David Byron and Quicksilver, Mayada, and Joe Dassin (his rendition, named "L'Amérique" reached No. 1 in France).

In Australia, Christie's version of "Yellow River" gained only limited airplay due to the 1970 radio ban. Local bands Jigsaw from Melbourne and Autumn from Sydney both had success with their cover versions. On the Go-Set National Top 60 it peaked at number one in October and was credited to Christie, Autumn, Jigsaw and Leapy Lee.

In the USSR, the band Singing Guitars (Поющие гитары) used the melody of "Yellow River" paired with the words to a Russian children's song called "Fat Karlsson" ("Толстый Карлсон").

== See also ==
- List of number-one hits of 1971 (Mexico)
