= Fable Records =

- Founded: 1970
- Founder: Ron Tudor
- Defunct: 1984
- Status: Defunct
- Genre: Pop, jazz, rock
- Country of origin: Australia
- Location: Melbourne, Victoria

Fable Records was an Australian independent record company which operated from 1970 to 1984. It was one of the most successful and productive Australian 'indie' labels of the period, issuing over 300 singles and dozens of EPs and LPs. Fable made a significant initial impact in Australia in 1970-71, scoring a string of hits by new Australian artists, and throughout its history the company discovered and promoted local talent. Fable enjoyed further success between 1972 and 1975 through its subsidiary label Bootleg Records, which racked up a string of hit albums and singles by artists including Brian Cadd, the Bootleg Family Band and Kerrie Biddell.

Fable/Bootleg released a wide variety of music from rock to mainstream vocal music. Its catalogue also included theatre organ music, Christian gospel music by singing group The Proclaimers, comedy recordings by veteran entertainer Frankie Davidson, and occasional novelty items like Drummond's 'chipmunk' version of "Daddy Cool" and a piano version of "In The Summertime" by film critic and honky-tonk piano virtuoso Ivan Hutchinson. Its debut single was "Curly", by variety performer and TV host Jimmy Hannan, and one of its last releases was single by TV personality Bert Newton and the Debney Park High School Band, which reportedly reached #11 on the Melbourne charts.

Fable also had a long association with Victorian Football League (VFL), beginning in 1972, when it released a series of officially authorised VFL football club songs, adapted from 'standards' like "Yankee Doodle Dandy". These were widely played in the 1970s, at matches and on TV and radio broadcasts. In 1979, Fable artist Mike Brady released "Up There Cazaly", which effectively became the VFL anthem, reaching #1 on the Australian charts and selling over 250,000 copies, becoming the most successful Australian single ever released up to that time, and earning it a place in the Guinness Book of Records.

== History ==
=== Background ===
Company founder Ron Tudor began his career in the music industry in the mid-1950s when he joined Melbourne label W&G Records as a sales representative, just as the company's new recording division was starting up. Over the next ten years he worked his way up through promotion to A&R and record production. Tudor discovered and first recorded emerging artists including Diana Trask, Ernie Sigley and The Seekers and was instrumental in getting The Seekers signed to W&G for their first recordings, producing their first album, which was recorded just before the group left for the UK.

After leaving W&G in 1966 Ron spent two years working at Astor Records and in 1968 he left to set up his own independent record production company, June Productions. A year later, in late 1969, he founded Fable Records with start-up capital of just $2. Tudor also established Fable Music Publishing; songs from its catalogue have been recorded by many notable Australian acts including John Farnham, Slim Dusty, Rolf Harris, Judith Durham, Anne Kirkpatrick, Olivia Newton-John, Brian Cadd, Debbie Byrne, Max Merritt, Margaret Urlich, Natalie Imbruglia, Marcia Hines, Col Joye, Diana Trask, Normie Rowe, The Bushwackers and Colleen Hewett.

An important factor in Fable's initial success was Tudor's association with the Nine Network TV talent quest New Faces. He was a member of the judging panel for several years, and among the prizes offered to heat and series winners was the chance to record with Fable. Many New Faces heat and series winners recorded for Fable and several became very successful—Liv Maessen, John Williamson, Stephen Foster, Dutch Tilders and Franciscus Henri were all New Faces 'discoveries' who launched their recording careers with Fable.

=== Label launch ===
Fable was officially launched in April 1970 with a batch of five singles (all by Australian artists), and quickly became very successful – seven of its first twelve singles made the national Top 40, and of the forty-one singles Fable released between April and December 1970, seventeen became hits, including two national #1s - The Mixtures' "In The Summertime" and "The Pushbike Song" - as well as four other Top 10 hits by Hans Poulsen, Liv Maessen, Jigsaw and John Williamson.

Liv Maessen's version of "Knock, Knock, Who's There?", which reached #2 nationally, was one of the most successful Australian singles of 1970, selling over 50,000 copies and earning Maessen the first Gold Record ever awarded to an Australian female performer. John Williamson also earned a Gold Record for his debut single "Old Man Emu", the song he had used to win New Faces and which helped him gain his Fable contract. Another notable Fable achievement was that the label scored thirty-six charting singles in Sydney alone during 1970.

Fable's second batch of singles, released in May 1970, included The Strangers' "Melanie Makes Me Smile", John Williamson's "Old Man Emu" and Jigsaw's "To Love Means To Be Free", each of which became a hit. The Strangers and John Williamson both debuted on the Go-Set national chart on 18 July 1970, joining "Knock, Knock, Who's There", Hans Poulsen's "Boom Sha La La Lo" and Pat Carroll's "All Kinds of Everything", giving Fable five singles in the national Top 40 in the same week.

=== Fable and the Radio Ban ===
A critical factor in Fable's chart breakthrough was the controversial 1970 radio ban, which began in May that year, a month after Fable was launched. The ban was the climax of a simmering "pay-for-play" dispute between a group of local record companies and the commercial radio sector. After Australia's new copyright laws were proclaimed in 1968, a group of major labels (EMI, Festival, Warner, CBS and Philips/Polygram) decided to scrap their long-standing agreement with commercial radio, dating back to the late 1950s, in which they provided radio stations with free promotional copies of new singles and albums. The record company group now demanded that a new royalty should be paid on all tracks played on air, but the radio stations, not surprisingly, balked at the idea of a new levy, which was set at 1% of the total annual revenue of the entire commercial radio industry, and when talks between the two parties broke down broke in April 1970 the labels placed a six-month embargo on the supply of free promotional records to commercial radio stations. The commercial stations responded by black-listing major-label product and refusing to list major-label titles in their Top 40 charts.

Desperate for material, radio stations turned to smaller local companies like Fable and Sparmac, who had declined to take part in the ban, and these independents made the most of this window of opportunity. Fable, in particular, achieved considerable commercial success during that time. Tudor was being sent regular packages of new UK releases from London by his friend, former EMI house producer David Mackay, and he optioned songs he thought would be suitable for his Fable acts. He had already scored a hit with the Liv Maessen version of Mary Hopkin's "Knock, Knock, Who's There?", and when he offered The Mixtures "In The Summertime", a song that had recently been a UK hit for Mungo Jerry. The band jumped at the chance to record it—although lead vocalist Idris Jones declined to sing on it, feeling it was too 'poppy', so bassist Mick Flinn performed the lead vocal.

For several weeks in the period from July to October 1970, at the height of the ban, Fable dominated the Go-Set singles chart, with as many as seven singles simultaneously in the Go-Set Top 60. They included a joint #1 hit (shared with Mungo Jerry) with "In The Summertime", a #2 hit with "Knock, Knock, Who's There" and a #3 hit with "Old Man Emu". On the 3 October chart, there were five Fable singles simultaneously in the Top 20—The Mixtures at #1, Jigsaw at #3, John Williamson at #6, The Strangers at #16 and Liv Maessen at #17. Maessen's new single, "Snowbird", debuted the same week, giving her two simultaneous Top 40 hits.

Fable's success continued through 1971. Early in the year it scored another Top 20 hit with a version of Cat Stevens' "Wild World", credited to the studio group Fourth House. This song (which competed with the Jimmy Cliff version) had been intended as a solo release for Mike Brady (ex MPD Ltd), but an oversight during the recording of the backing track resulted in the song being pitched too high for Brady's vocal range, so Tudor called in former Wild Cherries lead singer Danny Robinson to overdub the lead vocal. A few weeks later The Mixtures' follow-up single "The Pushbike Song" became a major local and international hit—it spent 12 weeks at #1 in Australia and also topped the charts in the UK, making it the first international hit to be entirely written, recorded and produced in Australia.

Fable's next hit was an unlikely success. In late 1970, Tudor concocted another anonymous studio band, which he dubbed Drummond, made up of members of folk-rock band Allison Gros (Graeham Goble, Russ Johnston and John Mower) and anonymous session players. They recorded a cover of George Harrison's "For You Blue" as Drummond's debut release. It made no impression, but the second Drummond single—a novelty 'chipmunk' rendition of Slay & Crewe's "Daddy Cool"—turned out to be one of the biggest Australian hits of 1971. Cashing in on the popularity of top local band Daddy Cool, who had included the song on their hugely successful debut LP, Drummond's version shot up the Go-Set national chart, reaching #1 in just six weeks and knocking Daddy Cool's landmark hit "Eagle Rock" off the top spot in mid-September. It stayed at #1 for eight weeks, charted for 21 weeks and became one of the biggest-selling local recordings of the year.

=== Brian Cadd and Bootleg Records ===
Fable was also the launching pad for the solo career of singer-songwriter-keyboardist Brian Cadd (ex-The Groop, Axiom). Fable issued the Brian Cadd-Don Mudie duo single "Show Me the Way" in December 1971. It was a Top 40 hit, reaching #17 in February 1972 and charting for 12 weeks. In early 1972 Brian joined Fable as an A&R manager and house producer, and in this capacity he wrote, sang, played on and produced many Fable releases, including Robin Jolley's 1972 hit single "Marshall's Portable Music Machine" and Robin's debut album. Cadd also produced Hans Poulsen's second solo album Lost and Found, Coming Home the Wrong Way Round (1972) and produced and/or played on Fable and Bootleg albums and singles by Stephen Foster, Fat Mamma, The Strangers, New Dream, Dutch Tilders, Bluestone, Kerrie Biddell and Daryl Somers.

In late 1971 Tudor and Cadd set up Fable's new subsidiary imprint Bootleg. Cadd had been inspired by the example of Leon Russell's Shelter Records label, and the way that Russell—a former member of crack L.A. session team 'The Wrecking Crew' -- had organised a group of regular players around him for projects like Joe Cocker's phenomenally successful "Mad Dogs & Englishmen" tour. In a similar vein, Cadd envisaged a regular Bootleg house band to back himself and all the other artists on the label, whom he would also produce, for recording and touring. At the time, the roster included singer-songwriter Steven Foster, jazz vocalist Kerrie Biddell, and the harmony-pop group Mississippi. Bootleg quickly became the most successful independent record label in the history of Australian popular music, and it was rivalled in the long term only by Michael Gudinski's Mushroom Records.

Over the next few years Cadd earned many gold and platinum records as a solo artist, numerous awards for film scores, title songs and TV themes, he produced many other acts and wrote and also produced advertising music. His debut solo single "Ginger Man" (inspired by the J.P. Donleavy novel) established him as a major Australian solo artist. It was a chart success, reaching #16 nationally on its release in October 1972 and charting for 18 weeks. His self-titled debut album reached #2, and spent 20 weeks on the album charts. Cadd also won the composer's section of the last 1972 Hoadley's National Battle of the Sounds with one of the songs from the LP, "Don't You Know It's Magic". He also performed the song at the Tokyo World Popular Song Festival, where he won the 'Most Outstanding Composition' award; John Farnham recorded his own successful version in 1973.

In 1973 Cadd formed the Bootleg Family Band to back himself and other artists on recordings and for touring; the group included many of the best Melbourne session musicians of the period including drummer Geoff Cox, who has played on scores of Australian hits. He also oversaw the Bootleg Family Band's own recordings, singing lead vocals and playing keyboards on their version of Loggins & Messina's "Your Mama Don't Dance", which was another major Australian hit that year, reaching #4 and charting for 17 weeks. Cadd's second album Parabrahm reached #5 nationally, and spawned a string of successful singles: "Every Mother's Son" (March), "Silver City Birthday Celebration Day" (July) and "Keep on Rockin'" (October). Cadd's next single "Alvin Purple" (November) was the theme song from Tim Burstall's feature film of the same name. Cadd also wrote the scores for both Alvin Purple (1973), and its sequel Alvin Rides Again (1975).

Cadd scored more hits through 1974 - the LP Moonshine (#16, September), the single "Class Of '74" (April), the theme song from the TV series of the same name, "Let Go" (#14 in September) and "Boogie Queen" (December). By this time Cadd had signed an American distribution deal and both Parabrahm and Moonshine came out on Chelsea Records in the US and he toured the US with the Bootleg Family Band during 1975.

Fable continued to score hits through 1972-73, including Matt Flinders' "Butterfly" (#4) Robin Jolley's debut single "Marshall's Portable Music Machine" (a #4 hit written and produced by Brian Cadd), The Mixtures "Captain Zero" (#5), the theme song from Bruce Beresford's The Adventures of Barry Mackenzie, performed by veteran 'trad' jazz singer Smacka Fitzgibbon, which reached #21, Jigsaw's "Mademoiselle Ninette" (#20) and Johnny Chester's Mother's Day tribute, "The World's Greatest Mum" (#9). This was the last major Fable hit for some time, but the label bounced back in early 1975 with Bill & Boyd's "Santa Never Made It Into Darwin", inspired by the disaster of Cyclone Tracy which went to #1. The duo had further success with their next single, "Put Another Log On The Fire".

== Late 1970s to label closure ==
When Brian Cadd relocated to the US in 1976, Bootleg lost its main creative force and its fortunes waned (although Fable continued to release records on Bootleg until 1978). By this time, major changes were taking place on the Australian music scene—Australia's "pop bible" of the late '60s and early '70s, Go-Set magazine, had ceased publication, colour TV had just been introduced, the ABC's national weekly pop show Countdown was ushering in the music video era and radio station 2JJ in Sydney – the first new radio station launched in Australia in over 30 years and Australia's first 24-hour non-commercial rock station – was fast becoming a major new force in radio, and recent media reforms by the Whitlam government saw the establishment of the community radio sector in Australia. Other local independent labels were also eating into Fable's market share, most notably Michael Gudinski's fast-growing Mushroom Records, which had shot to prominence in early 1975 with the record-setting success of Melbourne band Skyhooks.

When interviewed about the Radio Ban for a feature article by Toby Creswell, published in The Australian, Tudor stated that although his refusal to take part in the 1970 Radio Ban had helped to launch the label, it ultimately had damaging long-term consequences. He claimed that Fable had been unofficially 'blackballed' by the major labels, with the result that his business was effectively strangled by the problem of getting its records distributed, since smaller local independent labels like Fable were heavily reliant on the pressing and distribution facilities of the majors. In September 1978 Tudor and Leon Hill (of Armstrong Audio Video) approached the Minister for Posts and Telecommunications, Tony Staley and requested "an increase of local content on commercial stations... [eventually reaching] 40 percent."

Fable records struggled on into the early 1980s, scoring a last hit in 1980 with Mike Brady's VFL anthem "Up There Cazaly", which became the HSV-7 (Melbourne) football theme song and the biggest-selling Australian single released up to that time. Finally in 1984 Tudor sold the company and its catalogue to John McDonald's Image music group. The combined companies were subsequently relaunched as Fable Music.

Fable won many industry awards during its fifteen-year life. At the end of 1971 Fable won the Go-Set Pop Poll Professional Non-Performers award for the biggest contribution to the Australian Pop Industry by an individual or company. In 1972 Fable and Bootleg between them won eight of the sixteen awards given out by the Federation of Australian Commercial Broadcasters, including a Special Award of Merit for services to the industry. By the end of his association with Fable in July 1984, the company had amassed 20 gold and platinum records and 32 industry awards.

== Discography notes ==
All Fable and Bootleg singles and EPs were catalogued in the same numerical sequence, which started at "001", so numbering for releases on each label were non-consecutive. Fable 7" singles were prefixed "FB" and EPs were prefixed "FBEP", while Bootleg singles and EPs were prefixed "BL" and "BLEP". Fable and Bootleg LPs (which were all issued in stereo) were similarly catalogued in their own series, also beginning at "001"—Fable titles were prefixed "FBSA" and Bootleg titles were prefixed "BLA".

Almost all the Fable and Bootleg EPs were issued in just two batches—eight Fable EPs were released simultaneously in January 1973, and a mixed batch of two Fable and two Bootleg titles was issued in August that year.

Some Fable releases were titles licensed from overseas companies and issued under the "Fable International" banner, although it appears that there were only a handful of these releases, notably those by Philadelphia soul band Brenda & The Tabulations, and American actor Dennis Weaver.

== See also ==
- Ron Tudor
- Brian Cadd
- W&G Records
- Mushroom Records
- List of record labels
