= Stan Rofe =

Australian disc jockey (1933–2003)

- Born: Stanley Robert Rofe; 30 May 1933; Richmond, Victoria, Australia
- Died: 16 May 2003 (aged 69); Melbourne, Victoria, Australia
- Occupations: Radio personality, music newspaper reporter
- Years active: 1953–1990

Stanley Robert Rofe (30 May 1933 – 16 May 2003) was an Australian rock'n'roll disc jockey and music news reporter. Popularly referred to as Stan the Man, he presented the first rock and roll music on Melbourne radio from 1956, on 3KZ, and was a champion of Australian music. From February 1966 to March 1971 he was also a gossip news columnist for teen music newspaper, Go-Set. His "critical editorial like columns sought to prompt Australian pop musicians to do better." Stan Rofe died of cancer, aged 69, and was survived by his brother, Roy, and extended family.

In 2015, Rofe was inducted into the Music Victoria Hall of Fame.

== Biography ==
Stanley Robert Rofe was born on 30 May 1933, in Richmond to Esme and Percy. His father was an Essendon footballer and his mother was a former Tivoli dancer and show girl. He grew up with a younger brother, Roy. Rofe was a student at Faraday Street State School in Carlton and later at Collingwood Technical School.

In the late 1940s, a young Rofe got his first job in radio at 3AK, then mainly broadcasting at night when other Melbourne stations were off the air. Nevertheless, as a young child, Rofe was a fan of radio station 3KZ. His favourite announcer was Norman Banks who set the trend in the 1940s. To rehearse being Banks, Rofe would use kitchen pots for reverberation effects; these rehearsals occurred for years as his mother encouraged his aspiration for a radio career.

Rofe commenced work at sixteen and a year later he was teaching ballroom dancing and was a member of the Victorian Square Dance Championship Team that was third in their national competition. At eighteen Rofe was called up for three months national service training, which was followed by four years in the Citizens' Military Forces.

Early in 1953, after three days tuition at the Bill Roberts Radio School, a position was secured with 7AD in Devonport, Tasmania. After a few weeks Rofe was made Chief Announcer and later recalled, "it was a frightening experience that was too quick to worry about". Returning to Melbourne, he re-joined 3AK later that year, before moving to 3XY alongside Bert Newton when the station broadcast out of the Princess Theatre, Melbourne. He became known as Stan the Man and started his shows with, "Hi-de-hi, Victoria!". He recalled attending parties at Frank Thring's family home. (The Thring family had purchased the rights to operate 3XY from station owner the Liberal Party of Australia.) "Bert and I were always terrified at his parties, we never knew what was going to happen."

Rofe moved to 3KZ in 1955. He took up an afternoon trial slot combining popular music with listener's requests; he presented "Call up KZ", which required listeners to identify recordings. Phil Gibbs, 3KZ's program manager, had Rofe call night football games at South Melbourne's home ground. On occasions he would broadcast with Gibbs and Harry Mueller at Saturday games. For the Melbourne Olympic Games in 1956, Rofe was one of seventeen local commentators accredited by the Australian Federation of Commercial Broadcasting.

At the end of the Olympics Rofe presented "Spin for the Stars" and was intrigued as to how fellow DJ John Laws had secured American newly released records. Laws used Qantas pilots to bring singles from the United States and Britain. Some were from the Memphis-based Sun label's artists including Elvis Presley, Roy Orbison, Jerry Lee Lewis and Carl Perkins. Rofe copied Laws idea and incorporated the latest singles into his show, where they were inter-mixed with tracks by Perry Como, Peggy Lee, Rosemary Clooney, Bing Crosby, Doris Day and Frank Sinatra. Before the end of 1956 Rofe had introduced rock-n-roll to Melbourne radio.

Aside from Rofe's radio work he sponsored weekly dances at the Preston Town Hall from September 1960. He worked at 3KZ broadcasting from the Trades Hall building in Carlton for eight years, then moved to 3UZ, before returning to 3XY as music director in the 1970s. Rofe became a gossip news columnist and adviser for teenage popular music newspaper, Go-Set, in February 1966, while still at 3UZ. David Martin Kent described how his "popularity on the radio ensured further reasons to buy and read [the paper]." Whilst Rofe supported local artists his "critical editorial like columns sought to prompt Australian pop musicians to do better." Fellow gossip columnist at Go-Set was Ian Meldrum.

Kent contrasted Rofe's style which "became the default editorial. He was extremely critical of the development, or lack of development amongst Australian pop and rock musicians. For this, he was often derided by Go-Set's non-musician readers", whilst Meldrum's features "were never analytical; they tended to express an immediate view about an issue or personality." According to Kent "Rofe had been restrained with respect to his comments on Australian music, Meldrum tended to be more emotional and biased."

Rofe's popularity peaked in February 1968 when he was appointed King of Moomba, a local festival. Lily Brett, another Go-Set journalist, interviewed Rofe for their newspaper, "Stan Rofe has achieved his notoriety by being outspoken, honest, occasionally bitchy emotionally erratic, and a top disc jockey, intensely involved in the pop world." Rofe also guested on TV music programs, Uptight (1967–69) and Happening 70 (1970).

Rofe had criticised a local band, Procession, on Uptight and branded their single, "Anthem", as a "joke" – he wagered with Brett that it would not reach 3UZ's top 10, and lost. The group responded with a re-written version of "God Save the Queen" as "Anthem for Stan". His last column for Go-Set was in March 1971. He later broadcast on 3DB and finally was heard on Gold-FM, the successor to 3KZ.

=== Legacy and influence ===
Rofe helped expand Johnny O'Keefe's (JOK) popularity: he was the first Melbourne DJ to play the artist's debut single, "You Hit the Wrong Note Billy Goat". Rofe met JOK in 1957 and later remembered, "We had a few drinks and we hit it off." He recommended that JOK record a cover of the Isley Brothers' "Shout", which became the rocker's signature hit.

Other artists including Johnny Chester, Ronnie Burns, Russell Morris and Normie Rowe, acknowledged Rofe's assistance in their careers and direction. Ian Meldrum opined that "He would encourage young groups to pursue their careers, and he would try and find a gig for them through the influential promoters he knew... At times he would actually pay money out of his own pocket, which today is unheard of." Rofe gave Meldrum the nickname, "Molly", when they worked together at Go-Set.

Morris recalled that "[Rofe] was an exceptional, warm man", and credits him for suggesting he do a cover of "Hush", the first hit for his band, Somebody's Image. "He was such a huge star, but his door would always be open for any 16-year-old kid who came into his studio with a record." In Dial 1179 The 3KZ Story (1984), R. R. Walker described Rofe, as "up there with the best of them. He is still a considerable force on the music front, indeed, he seems to hold an ageless fascination for rock-music devotees. [...] he handled most of the rock'n'roll programmes on the station. But there is more to him than that, for he has awide interest in other musical forms. His knowledge of the classics is almost as broad-spanning as his mastery of the more popular idiom." In 1989 Keith Glass issued a single, "When Stan Was the Man", in homage "I grew up listening to [him] on 3KZ... [he] was the best disc jockey in Australia... who played the newer sounds that other stations did not want to go with at the time."

At the ARIA Music Awards of 1994 Rofe's services to the music industry were recognised when he was presented with a Special Achievement Award. In August–September 2001 Australian Broadcasting Corporation (ABC) ran a six-part series, Long Way to the Top, with Rofe appearing in "Episode 1: A Bed of a Thousand Struggles 1956–1964" to describe JOK "The wild one really was the wild one."

Rofe died on 16 May 2003, aged 69, after being diagnosed with cancer. At his funeral service on 21 May 2003, more than 200 people attended the Trinity College chapel in Parkville, Victoria and they heard Rofe eulogised as a friend, a brother, an uncle, a mentor, a passionate supporter of Australian artists and of the Essendon Football Club. As the mourners left the chapel, "When Stan Was the Man", was being played. Ed Nimmervoll, another Go-Set journalist dedicated his book, Friday on My Mind (2004) to Rofe, who had inspired him to become focussed on music.

== Awards ==
=== Music Victoria Awards ===
The Music Victoria Awards are an annual awards night celebrating Victorian music. They commenced in 2005.

| Year | Nominee / work | Award | Result |
|---|---|---|---|
| 2015 | Stan Rofe | Hall of Fame | inductee |
