= Ed Nimmervoll =

Australian music journalist

- Born: Eduard Nimmervoll; 21 September 1947; Leonfelden, Austria
- Died: 10 October 2014 (aged 67); Melbourne, Victoria, Australia
- Occupations: Journalist; editor; author; music historian
- Writing career
- Period: 1966–2012
- Subject: Rock music
- Notable work: Friday on my mind: a year by year account of popular music in the Australian charts

Edward Charles Nimmervoll né Eduard Nimmervoll (21 September 1947 – 10 October 2014) was an Australian music journalist, author and historian. He worked on rock and pop magazines Go-Set (1966–1974) and Juke Magazine (1975–1992) both as a journalist and as an editor. From 2000, Nimmervoll was editor of HowlSpace, a website detailing Australian rock/pop music history, providing artist profiles, news and video interviews. He was an author of books on the same subject and co-authored books with musicians including Brian Cadd (early history of Australian rock) and Renée Geyer (her autobiography).

At the Music Victoria Awards of 2014, Nimmervoll was inducted into the Music Victoria Hall of Fame.

== Rock magazines and radio ==
Eduard Nimmervoll was born in Leonfelden, Austria, on 21 September 1947 to Eduard Franz (1918–1981) and Ludmilla (née Woitsch, 1921–2011) Nimmervoll, as the third of four children. His father was an Austrian Army sergeant (during World War 2), later a savings bank director and then teacher. Nimmervoll moved with his family to Melbourne in February 1956 via SS Arosa Kulm. He entered university to study architecture. Go-Set was Australia's first national pop magazine and Nimmervoll started contributing while still at university in 1966. He began compiling a national top 40 singles chart from 5 October 1966, later he wrote record reviews and by 1973 became its editor.

After Go-Set was taken over in 1974, Nimmervoll began Juke magazine, which was published weekly from 1975 until 1992. He was involved in creating Take 40 Australia, a local radio version of American Top 40. He also worked on radio and TV music specials.

== Author, editor and songwriter ==
Nimmervoll authored, co-authored or edited a number of books, including Friday on my mind: a year by year account of popular music in the Australian charts in 2003. It was reviewed by fellow author Chris Spencer in 2004:

"Nimmervoll writes about the major artists for each year, weaving stories, anecdotes and incidental information making for an interesting read. The reader is able to pick the book up from the coffee table and turn to any page and be immersed in a particular period of our pop history."

Nimmervoll was a contributor of biographies on the website Allmusic (AMG), mainly covering Australian performers and bands as diverse as country music legend Slim Dusty and post-grunge band Grinspoon. He co-wrote "Red-Headed Wild Flower" with Beeb Birtles for the Little River Band album Sleeper Catcher.

== Health concerns and death ==
Nimmervoll attended the ARIA Music Awards of 2013 on 1 December, where he "[passed] out for four minutes", raising concerns for his health. He received medical attention and, by 4 December, fellow former Juke journalist, Christie Eliezer, reported that Nimmervoll "was on the mend" and "is about to launch a new project soon".

Nimmervoll died of brain cancer on 10 October 2014 at the age of 67.

== Awards ==
=== Music Victoria Awards ===
The Music Victoria Awards are an annual awards night celebrating Victorian music. They commenced in 2005.

Year	Nominee / work	Award	Result	Ref.
2014	Ed Nimmervoll	Hall of Fame	inductee	

== Bibliography ==
Written or electronic resources credited to Nimmervoll as author, co-author or editor:

- Cadd, Brian and Ed Nimmervoll, (1975), The emerging years: the Australian pop scene, 1965-1975, Stanmore, N.S.W.: Cassell Australia; ISBN 0-7269-1351-0
- Geyer, Renée and Ed Nimmervoll, (2000), Confessions of a difficult woman: the Renée Geyer story, Softcover, Pymble, N.S.W.: HarperCollins; ISBN 0-7322-6563-0
- Lawrence, Michael, (1998), Showtime: the Cold Chisel story: the first decade and beyond Ed.Nimmervoll, Belmont, Vic.: M. Lawrence; ISBN 1-86503-118-6
- Nimmervoll, Ed, (1999) Ready, steady, go!: rock and pop: the Australian experience 1956-1971, [essay], Softcover, Melbourne, Vic: The Arts Centre; ISBN 0-646-37568-7
- (Ed.) Nimmervoll, Ed (2000), Howlspace: the living history of our music, [electronic resource], Melbourne, Vic.: White Room Electronic Publishing, available here
- Nimmervoll, Ed, (2003), Friday on my mind, Noble Park, Vic: Five Mile Press; ISBN 1-74124-048-4
- Nimmervoll, Ed and Euan Thorburn, (1977) 1000 Beatle Facts: (and a Little Bit of Hearsay), Hardcover, Sydney, N.S.W.: J. Albert & Son; ISBN 0-86913-044-7 (0-86913-044-7)
- Reyne, James (2001), ... and the horse you rode in on, [kit], Ed Nimmervoll; ISBN 1-877035-65-3
- Seymour, Mark (2005), Daytime and the dark, [kit], Ed. Nimmervoll, Malvern, Vic: Tandem Publishing; ISBN 1-877035-67-X
- (Ed.) Spencer, Chris, Paul McHenry, Zbig Nowara and Ed Nimmervoll, (1996), The who's who of Australian rock, [electronic resource], Melbourne, Vic.: Informit Royal Melbourne Institute of Technology; ISBN 0-86444-559-8
