= Christie (band) =

English rock band

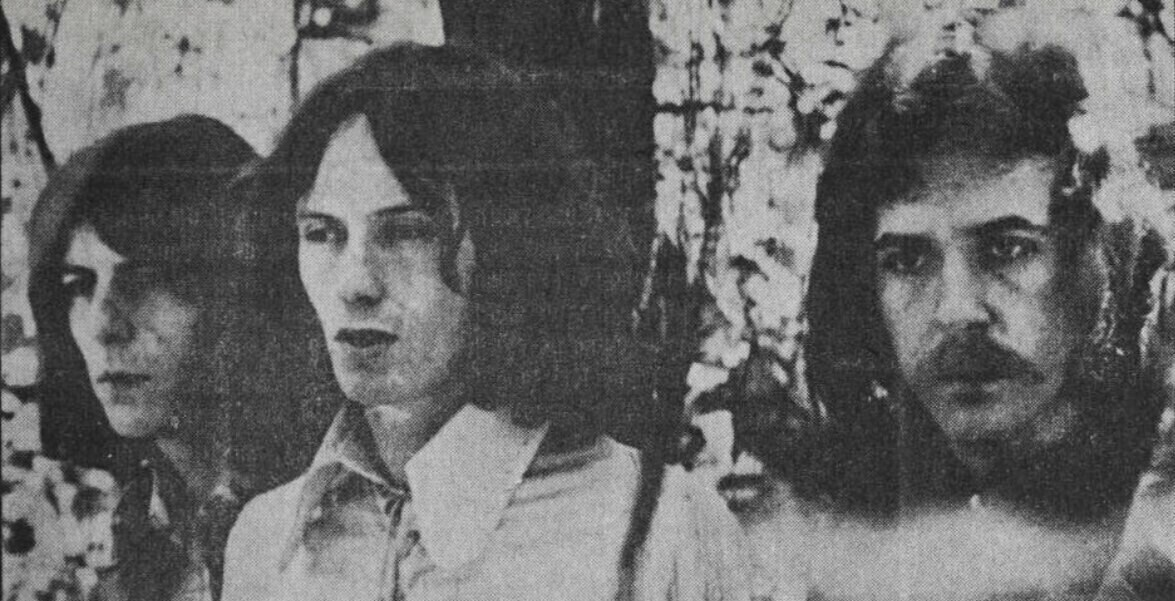
- Christie in 1971

Background information
- Origin: Leeds, West Yorkshire, England
- Genres: Pop rock, soft rock
- Years active: 1965–1976, 1990–present
- Labels: CBS (UK); Epic (US)
- Members: Jeff Christie; Simon Kay; Adrian Foster
- Past members: Paul Cardus; Vic Elmes; Mike Blakley; Paul Fenton; Lem Lubin; Terry Fogg; Roger Flavell; Danny Krieger; Tony Ferguson; Roger Willis; Kev Moore
- Website: http://www.jeffchristie.com

Christie are an English soft rock band that formed at the end of the 1960s. They are best remembered for their UK chart-topping hit single "Yellow River", released in 1970, which hit number one in 26 countries that year.

== Career ==
In addition to Jeff Christie (born Jeffrey Christie, 12 July 1946, Chapel Allerton, Leeds, Yorkshire, England) their vocalist, bassist and songwriter; they initially included guitarist Vic Elmes and drummer Mike Blakley (born Michael Blakley, 12 January 1947, Bromley, Kent, England, brother of Alan Blakley).

Jeff Christie had previously worked with several bands, including The Outer Limits, who released "Just One More Chance" / "Help Me Please" (1967) and "Great Train Robbery" / "Sweet Freedom" (1968).

In 1970, Jeff Christie offered his composition "Yellow River" to The Tremeloes. They recorded it to release as a single but changed their minds as they were going more progressive as the seventies started. At the same time Tremeloes member Alan Blakley's brother Michael had a little group called the Epics and Alan wanted to give his brother a break. They decided to get Jeff Christie to come down from Leeds and let him use the Tremeloes' backing track. The Epics became Christie with Jeff as the lead vocalist and the result was a UK number one hit in June 1970, and subsequently No. 23 in the US, also accumulating more weeks (23) on the Hot 100 than any other entry on that chart completely inside 1970. It was a worldwide hit and was number one in 26 countries with global sales of over 3 million.

The follow-up single from October 1970, "San Bernadino" (misspelled if referring to, for example, San Bernardino, California), reached UK Number 7 and Number 1 in Germany, but only US No. 100. Both tracks became flash songs on their eponymous debut album of that year, and it stayed on US Billboard 200 chart for ten weeks. But the trio failed to sustain a lasting career, and Blakley was replaced by Paul Fenton (born 4 July 1946, Huddersfield, Yorkshire) just before the release of the band's second album, For All Mankind (1971).

Lem Lubin (ex-Unit 4 + 2) was added to the line-up after the release of Iron Horse (1972), but the title track proved to be the band's final hit single. The departure of Fenton and Lubin hastened the demise of the original line-up, but Jeff Christie returned with new members Terry Fogg (drums) (born Terrence George Fogg, 25 September 1945, Chesterfield, Derbyshire), Roger Flavell (bass), and Danny Krieger (guitar). A 1974 single "Alabama" / "I'm Alive" failed to resurrect the band's fortunes, and new members Tony Ferguson (guitar) and Roger Willis (drums) were brought in to join Christie and Flavell. "JoJo's Band", written by Elmes, was a major hit for Christie in Argentina and Brazil, while the last Christie hit, "Navajo", was Number 1 in Mexico. In 1982 Vic Elmes enlisted Mick Blakley and Peter Morrison of NYPL, to tour Germany on a package tour. At the end of the tour, the band folded. The band recorded an Elmes song, Deep in the Night, produced by Alan Blakley.

Jeff Christie reformed the band in 1990 with members of UK band Tubeless Hearts, Kev Moore, Simon Kay and Adrian 'Fos' Foster. Tubeless Hearts tried to represent United Kingdom in the Eurovision Song Contest 1991 with a Jeff Christie song, "Safe in your Arms", but were unsuccessful. They continued to tour for a further 16 years all over Europe, Russia and Israel, recording intermittently. Following the release of Jeff Christie's Floored Masters double album, the 1990 line-up of Christie embarked on a 2009 European Tour. In 2012, a Christie double album, No Turn Unstoned, was released, a collection of Christie demos and unreleased songs.

== Band members ==
=== Current members ===
- Jeff Christie – bass, vocals, keyboards (1969–1976, 1990–present)
- Simon Kay – guitar (1990–present)
- Adrian Foster – drums (1990–present)

=== Former members ===
- Vic Elmes – guitar (1969–1973)
- Paul Cardus - bass guitar (1969)
- Mike Blakley – drums (1969–1970)
- Paul Fenton – drums (1970–1973)
- Lem Lubin – bass guitar (1972–1973)
- Terry Fogg – drums (1973–1974)
- Roger Flavell – bass guitar (1973–1976)
- Danny Krieger – guitar (1973–1976)
- Tony Ferguson – lead guitar (1974)
- Roger Willis – drums (1974–1976)
- Kev Moore – bass guitar (1990–2003)

== Discography ==
=== Albums ===
- Christie (1970, also known as Yellow River, No. 115 US)
- For All Mankind (1971)
- Iron Horse – unreleased (1972)
- Los Mas Grandes Exitos (1972)
- Navajo [released in Mexico] (1974)
- Christie Again – Greatest Hits and More (2004)
- Jeff Christie – Floored Masters (Past Imperfect) (2009)
- Christie – No Turn Unstoned (2012)
- Jeff Christie – Here and now (2024)

=== Singles ===
Jeff Christie with The Outer Limits

- "When the Work Is Thru'" (1967)
- "Just One More Chance/Help Me Please" (1967)
- "Great Train Robbery/Sweet Freedom" (1968)

Christie

Title	Year	Peak chart positions									
Title	Year	UK	AUS	BEL (FL)	GER	IRE	NL	NOR	NZ	SWI	US
"Yellow River"	1970	1	16	1	2	1	4	1	2	4	23
"San Bernadino"	1970	7	42	—	5	4	—	5	6	1	100
"Man of Many Faces"	1971	—	—	—	48	—	—	—	—	—	—
"Everything's Gonna Be Alright"	1971	—	—	—	—	—	—	—	—	—	—
"Iron Horse"	1972	47	—	—	47	—	13	10	—	—	—
"Fools Gold"	1972	—	—	—	—	—	—	—	—	—	—
"The Dealer (Down and Losin')"	1973	—	—	—	—	—	—	—	—	—	—
"Alabama"	1974	—	—	—	—	—	—	—	—	—	—
"Joe Joe's Band" (South America-only release)	1974	—	—	—	—	—	—	—	—	—	—
"Guantanamera"/"Navajo" (Italy and Americas-only release)	1975	—	—	—	—	—	—	—	—	—	—
"The Most Wanted Man in the USA" (Germany and Portugal-only release)	1975	—	—	—	—	—	—	—	—	—	—
"—" denotes releases that did not chart or were not released in that territory.

Jeff Christie solo

- "Both Ends of the Rainbow/Turn On Your Love Light|Turn on Your Lovelight" (1980)
- "Tightrope/Somebody Else" (1980)
- "Happy Christmas (War Is Over)/Yuletide Lights" (1997)
- "Hattrick of Lions (Come on England)" (2010)
- "You're Not There" with Lorenzo Gabanizza (2021)
- "I guess I am the only one" with Lorenzo Gabanizza (2022)
- "I don't want to live without you" with Lorenzo Gabanizza (2023)
- "Rainy day man" with Lorenzo Gabanizza (2024)

== See also ==
- List of artists who reached number one on the UK Singles Chart
- List of 1970s one-hit wonders in the United States
- 1970 in music
- List of Epic Records artists
- Bands and musicians from Yorkshire and North East England
- List of bands originating in Leeds
- List of performers on Top of the Pops
