= Don't Waste My Time (The Angels song) =

Single by The Angels

from the album Howling
- Released: 20 October 1986
- Genre: Hard rock
- Length: 3:54 (single version); 5:15 (extended version)
- Label: Mushroom
- Songwriters: Bob Spencer, Richard Brewster
- Producer: Steve Brown

The Angels singles chronology
"Nature of the Beast" (1986)	"Don't Waste My Time" (1986)	"We Gotta Out of This Place" (1986)

"Don't Waste My Time" is a song by Australian hard rock band the Angels, released in October 1986 as the second single from their eighth studio album Howling. The song peaked at number 40 on the Kent Music Report and number 38 on the Recorded Music NZ chart.

== Track listing ==
7-inch single (Mushroom K80)

1. Don't Waste My Time (Bob Spencer, Richard Brewster) - 3:54
2. Hide Your Face (Richard Brewster) - 3:54

12-inch single

1. Don't Waste My Time (Extended) (Bob Spencer, Richard Brewster) - 5:15
2. Hide Your Face (Richard Brewster) - 3:54
3. Don't Waste My Time (Bob Spencer, Richard Brewster) - 3:54

== Personnel ==
- Doc Neeson - lead vocals
- Rick Brewster - lead guitar, percussion
- Bob Spencer - rhythm guitar, backing vocals
- Jim Hilbun - bass guitar, sax, backing vocals, percussion
- Brent Eccles - drums
- Eddie Rayner - Keyboards
- Swami Brown - percussion
- Greg Thorne - Trumpet
- Tony Buchanan - Tenor and Bari Saxes
- Herbie Canon - Trombone

Production

- Steve Brown - Producer
- Andrew Scott - Engineer
- Al Wright - Engineer
- Heidi Cannova - Assistant Engineer
- Bill Price - Mixing
- Deitmar - Mixing Assistant

== Charts ==
Chart (1986)	Peak position
Australia (Kent Music Report)	40
New Zealand (Recorded Music NZ)	38
