= Red Back Fever / Left Hand Drive =

Red Back Fever/Left Hand Drive

Studio album (reissue) by The Angels
- Released: July 1992
- Genre: Hard rock
- Length: 101:25
- Label: Mushroom
- Producer: Steve James, The Angels

The Angels chronology
Red Back Fever (1991)	Red Back Fever/Left Hand Drive (1992)	Their Finest Hour... and Then Some (1992)

Professional ratings
Review scores
Source	Rating
AllMusic	4.5/5 stars
Collector's Guide to Heavy Metal	8/10

Red Back Fever/Left Hand Drive is a double album by Australian hard rock band The Angels, released in July 1992. The album is a re-issue of 1991's Red Back Fever with a disc, titled Left Hand Drivewhich is a disc of remixes, rarities, unreleased and deleted songs and B-Sides. This was later released as the second disc of Greatest Hits - the Mushroom Years with the addition of the track "Blue Light" from the deleted Hard Evidence Tour E.P..

The set peaked at number 28 on the ARIA Charts.

== Track listing ==
Disc 1 – Red Back Fever

1. "Tear Me Apart" (Bob Spencer, Richard Brewster, Brent Eccles) – 5:15
2. "Some of That Love" (Spencer, R. Brewster, Eccles) – 3:51
3. "Once Bitten Twice Shy" (Ian Hunter) – 4:38 (Ian Hunter cover)
4. "Child in You" (Amanda Brewster, R. Brewster) – 3:28
5. "Lyin' Awake in Bed" (Spencer, R. Brewster, Eccles) – 5:42
6. "Bedroom After Bedroom" (A. Brewster, Eccles, R. Brewster) – 3:58
7. "Red Back Fever" (Spencer, Eccles, Doc Neeson, James Morley, R. Brewster) – 3:59
8. "Don't Need You" (Spencer, Eccles, Morley, R.Brewster) – 2:20
9. "Natural Born Woman" (Steve Marriott) – 3:40 (Humble Pie cover)
10. "High and Dry" (Spencer, Eccles) – 5:53
11. "Hold On" (Spencer, R. Brewster, Eccles) – 6:12
12. "No More Words" (Spencer, R. Brewster, Eccles) – 1:42

Disc 2 – Left Hand Drive

1. "Don't Waste My Time" (Spencer, R. Brewster) – 5:15
2. "Junk City" (Neeson, R. Brewster, Spencer) – 6:23
3. "Dead Man's Shoes" (R. Brewster) – 4:37
4. "Backstreet Pickup" (Lipstick Remix) (Spencer, Neeson, R. Brewster, Morley, Terry Manning) – 7:25
5. "Don't Break Me Down" (Spencer, Eccles, R. Brewster) – 4:48
6. "Tear Me Apart" (Spencer, Eccles, R. Brewster) – 3:33
7. "Straight Aces" (Neeson, Jim Hilbun, Eccles, R. Brewster) – 4:02
8. "Blood on the Moon" (A. Brewster, R. Brewster) – 3:02
9. "Take an X (Neeson, R. Brewster, Spencer) – 6:37
10. "Man There" (R. Brewster) – 5:05

== Personnel ==
The Angels

- Doc Neeson – lead vocals
- Rick Brewster – lead guitar, keyboards, backing vocals
- Bob Spencer – guitar, backing vocals
- James Morley – bass guitar, backing vocals
- Brent Eccles – drums

Production

- Steve James – producer, engineer, mixing
- The Angels – producer
- David Hemming – mixing engineer
- Don Bartley – mastering engineer
- Craig McGill – design, illustration, artwork

== Charts ==
Chart (1992)	Peak position
Australian Albums (ARIA)	28
