= Can't Take Any More =

Single by The Angels

from the album Howling
- Released: April 1987
- Genre: Hard rock
- Length: 3:21
- Label: Mushroom
- Songwriters: Richard Brewster, Brent Eccles
- Producer: Steve Brown

The Angels singles chronology
"We Gotta Out of This Place" (1986)	"Can't Take Any More" (1987)	"Am I Ever Gonna See Your Face Again (live)" (1988)

"Can't Take Any More" is a song by Australian hard rock band the Angels, released in April 1987 as the fourth and final single from their eighth studio album Howling. "Can't Take Any More" peaked at number 63 on the Kent Music Report.

== Track listings ==
7-inch single (Mushroom K258)

1. Can't Take Any More (Richard Brewster, Brent Eccles) - 3:21
2. Stonewall (John Brewster, Brent Eccles, Richard Brewster) - 4:11

12-inch single

1. Can't Take Any More (Brent Eccles, Richard Brewster) - 3:21
2. Stonewall (John Brewster, Brent Eccles, Richard Brewster) - 4:11
3. All Night For You (Doc Neeson, Mark Lieb) - 3:20

== Personnel ==
- Doc Neeson – lead vocals
- Rick Brewster – lead guitar
- Bob Spencer – rhythm guitar, backing vocals
- Jim Hilbun – bass guitar, sax, backing vocals
- Brent Eccles – drums
- Eddie Rayner – keyboards
- Mary Azzopardi – backing vocals on "Hide Your Face" and "Can't Take Anymore"
- Bridget O'Donoghue – backing vocals on "Hide Your Face" and "Can't Take Anymore"

Production

- Steve Brown – producer
- Andrew Scott – engineer
- Al Wright – engineer
- Heidi Cannova – assistant engineer
- Bill Price – mixing
- Deitmar – mixing assistant

== Charts ==
Chart (1987)	Peak position
Australia (Kent Music Report)	63
