= Dogs Are Talking =

Single by The Angels

from the album Beyond Salvation
- Released: 30 April 1990
- Genre: Hard rock
- Length: 3:23
- Label: Mushroom Records
- Songwriter(s): Doc Neeson, Bob Spencer, Richard Brewster, Brent Eccles, James Morley
- Producer(s): Terry Manning

The Angels singles chronology
"Let the Night Roll On" (1990)	"Dogs Are Talking" (1990)	"Back Street Pickup" (1990)

"Dogs Are Talking" is a song by Australian hard rock band the Angels, released in April 1990 as the second single from The Angels ninth studio album Beyond Salvation. The flipside featured tracks from bands who would be touring in support slots in both Australia and New Zealand, The Hurricanes, Baby Animals and The Desert Cats for Australia and Nine Livez and Shihad for New Zealand.

"Dogs Are Talking" peaked at number 11 on the ARIA Charts and it also peaked at number 12 on the Recorded Music NZ.

== Track listing ==
1. Dogs Are Talking (Doc Neeson, Bob Spencer, Richard Brewster, Brent Eccles, James Morley) - 3:23

Australian edition

1. Hold On (Demo) - The Hurricanes (Carl Bell, James Bell, Nick Tsalis) -
2. Break My Heart (Baby Animals) (Eddie Parise, Suze DeMarchi) - 4:02
3. I Got You / You Got Me (Demo) (The Desert Cats) (Rob Tognoni) -

New Zealand edition

1. Live It Up (Demo) - (Nine Livez) (Mike Friedlos, Michael Betts, Harvey Jackson)
2. Down Dance - (Shihad) (Jon Toogood, Tom Larkin, Phil Knight, Hamish Laing) - 5:45

== Personnel ==
The Angels

- Doc Neeson – lead vocals
- Rick Brewster – lead guitar
- Bob Spencer – rhythm guitar, backing vocals
- James Morley – bass guitar, backing vocals
- Brent Eccles – drums

Production

- Terry Manning - producer (tracks: 1),

== Charts ==
=== Weekly charts ===
Chart (1990)	Peak position
Australia (ARIA)	11
New Zealand (Recorded Music NZ)	12

=== Year-end charts ===
Chart (1990)	Peak position
Australia (ARIA Charts)	64

== Certifications ==
Certifications for Dogs Are Talking
Region	Certification	Certified units/sales
Australia (ARIA)	Gold	35,000^{^}
^{^} Shipments figures based on certification alone.
