= Beyond Salvation =

Studio album by The Angels
- Released: June 1990 (Australia); November 1989 (US)
- Recorded: 1989
- Studio: Ardent Studios and Alpha Sound, Memphis, Tennessee
- Genre: Hard rock
- Length: 48:25
- Label: Mushroom (Australia); Chrysalis (rest of the world)
- Producer: Terry Manning

The Angels chronology
Live Line (1987)	Beyond Salvation (1990)	Red Back Fever (1991)

Singles from Beyond Salvation
- 1. "Let the Night Roll On" Released: January 1990; 2. "Dogs Are Talking" Released: 20 April 1990; 3. "Back Street Pickup" Released: July 1990; 4. "Rhythm Rude Girl" Released: October 1990; 5. "Bleeding with the Times" Released: February 1991

Professional ratings
Review scores
Source	Rating
Collector's Guide to Heavy Metal	7/10

Beyond Salvation is the ninth studio album by the Australian hard rock band The Angels, produced and recorded in Memphis by Terry Manning. It was released in the US in November 1989 and in Australia in June 1990. The album peaked at No. 1 on the ARIA Albums Chart and it also peaked at number 3 on the Recorded Music NZ.

The US version of the album, released under the name The Angels From Angel City, featured a vastly different track listing. It was made up of 4 brand new songs, "Dogs Are Talking", "Rhythm Rude Girl", "Let the Night Roll On" (the only 3 songs to also appear on the Australian edition), and "Junk City" (Australian single B-side to "Let the Night Roll On"), and re-recordings of 5 classic Angels songs, "City Out of Control" (Night Attack, 1981), "Am I Ever Gonna See Your Face Again" (The Angels, 1977), "I Ain't the One" (Face to Face, 1978), "Who Rings The Bell" (The Angels' Greatest, 1980), and "Can't Shake It" (No Exit, 1979).

== Track listing ==
Credits adapted from the original releases.

=== Australian release ===
1. "Let the Night Roll On" (Doc Neeson, Richard Brewster, Amanda Miller) – 4:04
2. "Back Street Pickup" (Bob Spencer, Brewster, Neeson, Terry Manning, James Morley) – 4:22
3. "Dogs Are Talking" (Brewster, Spencer, Neeson, Brent Eccles, Morley) – 3:23
4. "Rhythm Rude Girl" (Spencer, Brewster) – 5:36
5. "Jump Back Baby" (Brewster, Spencer, Neeson, Eccles) – 5:35
6. "Love Waits" (Brewster, Neeson, Spencer, Eccles, Jim Hilbun) – 4:25
7. "Bleeding with the Times" (Brewster, Miller) – 5:36
8. "Pushing and Shoving" (Spencer, Brewster) – 4:35
9. "Bitch" (Brewster, Miller) – 2:23
10. "Beyond Salvation" (Brewster, Spencer, Neeson, Eccles) – 3:27
11. "Take an X" (Neeson, Brewster, Spencer, Micheal Towers) – 4:54

=== American version ===
An American version of the album was released in 1989 under the band name The Angels from Angel City.

1. "Dogs Are Talking" – 3:23
2. "Rhythm Rude Girl" – 5:58
3. "Let the Night Roll On" – 4:58
4. "City Out of Control" – 5:35
5. "Junk City" – 6:23
6. "Am I Ever Gonna See Your Face Again" – 3:56
7. "I Ain't the One" – 2:24
8. "Who Rings the Bell" – 3:26
9. "Can't Shake It" – 4:52

== Personnel ==
The Angels

- Doc Neeson – lead vocals
- Rick Brewster – lead guitar, rhythm guitar, bass guitar
- Bob Spencer – lead guitar, rhythm guitar, bass guitar, backing vocals
- James Morley – bass guitar, backing vocals
- Brent Eccles – drums

Production

- Terry Manning – producer, engineer, mixing
- Bob Ludwig – mastering

== Charts ==
=== Weekly charts ===
Chart (1989/90)	Peak position
Australian Albums (ARIA)	1
New Zealand Albums (RMNZ)	3

=== Year-end charts ===
Chart (1990)	Peak position
Australian (ARIA Charts)	23

== Certifications ==
Certifications for Beyond Salvation
Region	Certification	Certified units/sales
Australia (ARIA)	Platinum	70,000^{^}
^{^} Shipments figures based on certification alone.
