= Evidence (The Angels album) =

Compilation album by The Angels
- Released: December 1994
- Genre: Hard rock, pub rock, acoustic rock
- Length: 72:55
- Label: Mushroom
- Producer: Various

The Angels chronology
Their Finest Hour... and Then Some (1992)	Evidence (1994)	Skin & Bone (1998)

Singles from Evidence
- 1. "Don't Need Mercy" Released: October 1994; 2. "Turn It On" Released: February 1995

Evidence is a compilation album by Australian hard rock band The Angels, released in December 1994. It reached No. 30 on the ARIA Albums Chart. Two new singles were also released on the album.

In addition to this, The Angels include their cover of The Animals' single "We Gotta Get Out of This Place". This cover includes a saxophone solo which is not a part of the original arrangement.

The front cover booklet states "This record represents The Angels' first ever opportunity to release a collection of songs which span the entire history of the band. this has been made possible by the collaboration of Mushroom, Sony and Albert"

The manufacturing production code printed on the compact disc is MUSH32367.2, and the catalogue number listed on the back cover insert is TVD93368 (RMD53368).

== Track listing ==
No.	Title	Writer(s)	Length
1.	"Don't Need Mercy (new track)"	Doc Neeson, John Brewster, Richard Brewster	4:28
2.	"Let the Night Roll On"	Doc Neeson, Richard Brewster, Amanda Miller	4:03
3.	"Dogs Are Talking"	Jim Hilbun, Richard Brewster, Bob Spencer, Brent Eccles	3:23
4.	"Don't Waste My Time"	Bob Spencer, Richard Brewster	3:52
5.	"Turn It On (new track)"	Bob Spencer, Brent Eccles, Doc Neeson, Richard Brewster	3:59
6.	"Marseilles"	Doc Neeson, John Brewster, Richard Brewster	4:51
7.	"Shadow Boxer"	Doc Neeson, John Brewster, Richard Brewster	2:41
8.	"Take a Long Line"	Doc Neeson, John Brewster, Richard Brewster	3:00
9.	"Be with You"	Doc Neeson, John Brewster, Richard Brewster	3:44
10.	"Fashion and Fame"	Doc Neeson, John Brewster, Richard Brewster	4:38
11.	"Face the Day"	Doc Neeson, John Brewster, Richard Brewster	6:09
12.	"No Secrets"	Graham Bidstrup, Doc Neeson	4:18
13.	"Backstreet Pickup"	Bob Spencer, Richard Brewster, Doc Neeson, Terry Manning, James Morley	4:21
14.	"Small Price"	John Brewster, Richard Brewster	4:36
15.	"Eat City"	Doc Neeson, Richard Brewster	3:24
16.	"Stand Up"	Jim Hilbun	3:16
17.	"Tear Me Apart"	Bob Spencer, Brent Eccles, Richard Brewster	3:33
18.	"We Gotta Get Out of This Place"	Barry Mann, Cynthia Weil	4:40

"Don't Need Mercy" (1994)
"Don't Need Mercy" (Evidence), demonstrating The Angels' typical style of hard rock/pub rock.

"Turn It On" (1994)
"Turn It On" (Evidence) has extensive use of acoustic electric guitars, a style popularly known as "Unplugged" which was popular in the early 1990s.

"We Gotta Get Out Of This Place" (1994)
"We Gotta Get Out Of This Place" (Evidence), a cover which includes saxophone solo that is not present in the original arrangement by The Animals.

== Charts ==
Chart (1994/95)	Peak position
Australian Albums (ARIA)	30
New Zealand Albums (RMNZ)	44

== Certifications ==
Certifications for Evidence
Region	Certification	Certified units/sales
Australia (ARIA)	Gold	35,000^{^}
^{^} Shipments figures based on certification alone.
