= We Gotta Get Out of This Place =

1965 single by the Animals

"We've Gotta Get Out of This Place"

Single by the Animals
- B-side: "I Can't Believe It"
- Released: 16 July 1965
- Recorded: 15 June 1965
- Genre: Blues rock
- Length: 3:17
- Label: Columbia Graphophone (UK); MGM (US)
- Songwriters: Barry Mann; Cynthia Weil
- Producer: Mickie Most

The Animals singles chronology
"Bring It On Home to Me" (1965)	"We've Gotta Get Out of This Place" (1965)	"It's My Life" (1965)

"We Gotta Get Out of This Place", occasionally written "We've Gotta Get Out of This Place", is a rock song written by American songwriters Barry Mann and Cynthia Weil and recorded as a 1965 hit single by English band the Animals. It has become an iconic song of its type and was immensely popular with United States Armed Forces G.I.s during the Vietnam War.

In 2004, it was ranked number 233 on Rolling Stone's "The 500 Greatest Songs of All Time" list; it is also in The Rock and Roll Hall of Fame's 500 Songs that Shaped Rock and Roll list.

In 2011, the song was inducted into the Grammy Hall of Fame.

== History ==
Barry Mann and Cynthia Weil were husband and wife (and future Songwriters Hall of Fame) songwriters associated with the 1960s Brill Building scene in New York City.

Mann and Weil wrote and recorded "We Gotta Get Out of This Place" as a demo, with Mann singing and playing piano. It was intended for the Righteous Brothers, for whom they had written the number one hit "You've Lost That Lovin' Feelin'" but then Mann gained a recording contract for himself, and his label Red Bird Records wanted him to release it instead. Meanwhile, record executive Allen Klein had heard it and gave the demo to Mickie Most, the Animals' producer. Most already had a call out to Brill Building songwriters for material for the group's next recording session (the Animals hits "It's My Life" and "Don't Bring Me Down" came from the same call), and the Animals recorded it before Mann could.

In the Animals' rendition, the lyrics were slightly reordered and reworded from the demo and opened with a locational allusion – although different from that in the songwriters' minds – that was often taken as fitting the group's industrial, working class Newcastle-upon-Tyne origins:

In this dirty old part of the city
Where the sun refused to shine
People tell me, there ain't no use in tryin'

Next came a verse about the singer's father in his deathbed after a lifetime of working his life away, followed by a call-and-response buildup, leading to the start of the chorus:

We gotta get out of this place!
If it's the last thing we ever do…

The arrangement featured a distinctive bass lead by group member Chas Chandler. This was the first single not to be recorded by the original line-up, following as it did the departure of keyboard player Alan Price and his replacement by Dave Rowberry. It featured one of singer Eric Burdon's typically raw, fierce vocals. Rolling Stone described the overall effect as a "harsh white-blues treatment from The Animals. As [Burdon] put it, 'Whatever suited our attitude, we just bent to our own shape.'"

The song reached number 2 on the UK Singles Chart on 14 August 1965 (held out of the top slot by the Beatles' "Help!"). The following month, it reached number 13 on the U.S. Billboard Hot 100, its highest placement there. In Canada, the song also reached number 2, on 20 September 1965.

=== The two versions ===
The UK and US single releases were different versions from the same recording sessions. The take that EMI, the Animals' parent record company, sent to MGM Records, the group's American label, was mistakenly one that had not been selected for release elsewhere. The two versions are most easily differentiated by the lyric at the beginning of the second verse: in the US version the lyric is, "See my daddy in bed a-dyin'", while the UK version uses, "Watch my daddy in bed a-dyin'" (as a result of an error by the music labels, certain online retailers sell the UK version but incorrectly identify it as the US version).

In the US the song (in its "mistaken" take) was included on the album Animal Tracks, released in the autumn of 1965, and again on the popular compilation The Best of The Animals released in 1966 and re-released with an expanded track list on the ABKCO label in 1973. The song was not on any British Animals album during the group's lifetime. Cash Box described the US version as a "laconic, blues-drenched romancer about a duosome who feel hemmed-in living in the city." Record World said that "the Animals wail for 3:17 worth ... about the pressures of the city on young lovers" and considered it as a counterexample to the proposition that "rock and roll lyrics don't mean anything."

Once Animals' reissues began occurring during the compact disc era, Allen Klein, by then owner of ABKCO and the rights to this material, dictated that the correct British version be used on all reissues and compilations everywhere. Thus, as US radio stations converted from vinyl records to CDs, gradually only the British version became heard. Some collectors and fans in the US wrote letters of complaint to Goldmine magazine, saying they believed the US version featured an angrier and more powerful vocal from Burdon, and in any case wanted to hear the song in the form they had grown up with. The 2004 remastered SACD Retrospective compilation from ABKCO included the US version, as did the budget-priced compilation The Very Best of the Animals.

== Charts ==
Chart (1965)	Peak position
Canada RPM Magazine	2
Finnish Soumen Virallinen Singles Chart	27
German Singles Chart	31
New Zealand (Lever Hit Parade)	6
UK Singles Chart	2
US Billboard Hot 100	13

== Impact ==
At the time, the title and simple emotional appeal of "We Gotta Get Out of This Place" lent itself to some obvious self-identifications—for instance, it was a very popular number to be played at high school senior proms and graduation parties. In music writer Dave Marsh's view, it was one of a wave of songs in 1965, by artists such as the Beatles, the Rolling Stones, and Bob Dylan, that ushered in a new role for rock music as a vehicle for common perspective and as a force for social consciousness. Writer Craig Werner sees the song as reflecting the desire of people to take a hard look at their own lives and the community from where they come. Burdon later said, "The song became an anthem for different people – everybody at some time wants to get out of the situation they're in."

The song was very popular with United States Armed Forces members stationed in South Vietnam during the Vietnam War. It was frequently requested of, and played by, American Forces Vietnam Network disc jockeys. During 2006 two University of Wisconsin–Madison employees, one a Vietnam veteran, began an in-depth survey of hundreds of Vietnam veterans, and found that "We Gotta Get Out of This Place" had resonated the strongest among all the music popular then: "We had absolute unanimity is this song being the touchstone. This was the Vietnam anthem. Every bad band that ever played in an armed forces club had to play this song." Just such a band played the song in an episode ("USO Down", by Vietnam veteran Jim Beaver) of the American television series about the war, Tour of Duty, and the song is reprised in the episode's final scene.

"We Gotta Get Out of This Place" was also used in Dennis Potter's 1965 television play Stand Up, Nigel Barton and the BBC's 1996 Newcastle-set Our Friends in the North, which partially took place in the 1960s. In America it was used as the title credits song in some episodes of the Vietnam War-set television series China Beach. It was then applied to the Bin Laden family, having to leave the United States in the aftermath of the 11 September terrorist attacks, in Michael Moore's 2004 Fahrenheit 9/11. It also was featured in the soundtrack to the 1987 movie Hamburger Hill. It was used in a third-season episode of the 2000s television series Heroes. It was used as the theme song for 2002 BBC comedy TLC and the 2013 BBC series Privates. The song was also featured humorously in the Kong: Skull Island trailer.

In a 2012 keynote speech to an audience at the South by Southwest music festival, Bruce Springsteen performed an abbreviated version of the Animals' version on acoustic guitar and then said, "That's every song I've ever written. That's all of them. I'm not kidding, either. That's 'Born to Run', 'Born in the U.S.A.'"

== In popular culture ==
The song's title and theme have become a common cultural phrase over the years.

It formed the basis for the title of academician Lawrence Grossberg's We Gotta Get Out of This Place: Popular Conservatism and Postmodern Culture (1992), detailing the conflict between American conservatism and rock culture. Similarly, it formed the title basis for Gerri Hirshey's 2002 account, We Gotta Get Out of This Place: The True, Tough Story of Women in Rock.

It has also been used as the title of editorials by American Journalism Review and other publications. The title was even used to name an art exhibit, curated by Stefan Kalmár at the Cubitt Gallery in London in 1997.

The song featured in the soundtrack of Bob Carlton's jukebox musical Return to the Forbidden Planet.

The band perform the song in the film It's a Bikini World (1967).

== The Angels version ==
"We Gotta Get Out of This Place"

Single by the Angels

from the album Howling
- Released: December 1986
- Genre: Hard rock
- Length: 4:43
- Label: Mushroom
- Songwriters: Barry Mann, Cynthia Weil
- Producer: Steve Brown

The Angels singles chronology
"Don't Waste My Time" (1986)	"We Gotta Get Out of This Place" (1986)	"Can't Take Any More" (1987)

"We Gotta Get Out of This Place" was covered by Australian hard rock band the Angels and released in December 1986 as third single to be released from The Angels eighth studio album Howling. The song peaked at number 7 on the Kent Music Report and number 13 on the Recorded Music NZ.

=== Track listing ===
7" single (Mushroom K210)

1. We Gotta Get Out of This Place (Barry Mann, Cynthia Weil) - 4:43
2. I Just Wanna Be With You (New Version) (Doc Neeson, John Brewster, Richard Brewster) - 3:54

=== Personnel ===
- Bass, Vocals, Saxophone – Jim Hilbun
- Drums – Brent Eccles
- Lead Guitar – Rick Brewster
- Lead Vocals – Doc Neeson
- Rhythm Guitar – Bob Spencer

Production

- Steve Brown (tracks: 1)
- Ashley Howe (tracks: 2)

=== Charts ===
==== Weekly charts ====
Chart (1986–1987)	Peak position
Australia (Kent Music Report)	7
New Zealand (Recorded Music NZ)	13

==== Year-end charts ====
Chart (1987)	Position
Australia (Kent Music Report)	35
New Zealand (Recorded Music NZ)	40

== Other versions ==
"We Gotta Get Out of This Place" has been recorded or performed in concert by numerous artists, including John O'Hara and His Playboys (1965), the Savages (1966), the Cryan' Shames (1966), the American Breed (1967), the Frost (1970), the Partridge Family (1972), Bruce Springsteen (performed only a handful of times in his career, but acknowledged by him as one of his primary influences in the 1970s), Udo Lindenberg (in a German language adaption in the 1970s for which commercial success was small), Blue Öyster Cult (1978), Steve Bender (1978), Gilla (1979), Angelic Upstarts (1980), Gardens & Villa, Grand Funk Railroad (1981), David Johansen (1982, and a hit on album oriented rock radio and MTV as part of an Animals medley), Fear (1982), After the Fire (1983, unreleased), Richard Thompson (1988), Bon Jovi (1992, again as part of an Animals medley for an MTV special), Midnight Oil (1993, for MTV Unplugged), Alice Cooper (2011), and many others.

In 1990, Eric Burdon joined Katrina and the Waves for a recording of it for use on China Beach. In 2000, Barry Mann revisited the song, performing it with Bryan Adams on Mann's retrospective solo album Soul & Inspiration. When Suzi Quatro was on a German tour in 2008 she came on stage and played bass on the song during an Eric Burdon concert at the Porsche Arena in Stuttgart. Burdon also performed it in 2010 at the Rock and Roll Hall of Fame Induction Ceremony, when songwriters Mann and Weil were inducted. Later in 2010, Mann and Weil were at The Grammy Museum in Los Angeles – to open a gallery for the Songwriter's Hall of Fame – and performed their original version of the song, including previously unheard lyrics like "What are we waiting for?" (which was supposed to occur before the familiar lyrics in the chorus).
