= Red Back Fever =

- Cover of the red vinyl special edition LP

Studio album by The Angels
- Released: November 1991
- Studio: Trackdown Studios, Sydney, Australia and Ardent Studios, Memphis, Tennessee
- Genre: Hard rock
- Length: 50:38
- Label: Mushroom
- Producer: Steve James and The Angels

The Angels chronology
Beyond Salvation (1990)	Red Back Fever (1991)	Red Back Fever / Left Hand Drive (1992)

Singles from Red Back Fever
- 1. "Some of That Love" Released: October 1991; 2. "Once Bitten, Twice Shy" Released: January 1992; 3. "Tear Me Apart" Released: July 1992

Red Back Fever is the tenth studio album by hard rock band The Angels and reached No. 14 on the ARIA Albums Chart and No. 41 in New Zealand.

== Track listing ==
1. "Tear Me Apart" (Bob Spencer, Richard Brewster, Brent Eccles) – 5:15
2. "Some of That Love" (Spencer, R. Brewster, Eccles) – 3:51
3. "Once Bitten Twice Shy" (Ian Hunter) – 4:38 (Ian Hunter cover)
4. "Child in You" (Amanda Brewster, R. Brewster) – 3:28
5. "Lyin' Awake in Bed" (Spencer, R. Brewster, Eccles) – 5:42
6. "Bedroom After Bedroom" (A. Brewster, Eccles, R. Brewster) – 3:58
7. "Red Back Fever" (Spencer, Eccles, Doc Neeson, James Morley, R. Brewster) – 3:59
8. "Don't Need You" (Spencer, Eccles, Morley, R.Brewster) – 2:20
9. "Natural Born Woman" (Steve Marriott) – 3:40 (Humble Pie cover)
10. "High and Dry" (Spencer, Eccles) – 5:53
11. "Hold On" (Spencer, R. Brewster, Eccles) – 6:12
12. "No More Words" (Spencer, R. Brewster, Eccles) – 1:42

== Personnel ==
The Angels

- Doc Neeson – lead vocals
- Rick Brewster – lead guitar, rhythm guitar, piano, organ, backing vocals
- Bob Spencer – lead guitar, rhythm guitar, backing vocals
- James Morley – bass guitar, backing vocals
- Brent Eccles – drums

Additional musicians

- Steve James – bass and percussion on track 3, backing vocals on tracks 2 and 3
- Chris Harris – harmonica on track 2

Production

- Steve James – producer, engineer, mixing at Gotham Audio, Melbourne, Australia
- James Cadsky – engineer
- David Hemming – mixing
- Nigel Derricks – mixing assistant
- Don Bartley – mastering at EMI Studios 301, Sydney, Australia

== Charts ==
Chart (1991/92)	Peak position
Australian Albums (ARIA)	14
New Zealand Albums (RMNZ)	41

== Certifications ==
Region	Certification	Certified units/sales
Australia (ARIA)	Gold	35,000^{^}
^{^} Shipments figures based on certification alone.
