= Back Street Pickup =

1990 song performed by The Angels

Single by The Angels

from the album Beyond Salvation
- Released: 15 July 1990
- Genre: Hard rock
- Length: 4:22
- Label: Mushroom
- Songwriter(s): Doc Neeson; Bob Spencer; Richard Brewster; James Morley; Terry Manning
- Producer(s): Terry Manning

The Angels singles chronology
"Dogs Are Talking" (1990)	"Back Street Pickup" (1990)	"Rhythm Rude Girl" (1990)

"Back Street Pickup" is a song by Australian hard rock band, the Angels, released in July 1990 as the third single from their ninth studio album Beyond Salvation. The song peaked at number 23 on the ARIA Charts and reached number 29 on the Recorded Music NZ chart.

== Track listing ==
Mushroom (K 10131)

1. Back Street Pickup (Doc Neeson, Bob Spencer, Richard Brewster, James Morley, Terry Manning) - 4:27
2. Take It Easy (Spencer, Neeson, R Brewster, Manning) - 6:05
3. Fashion And Fame (Live) (Neeson, John Brewster, R Brewster) - 4:49
4. Love Takes Care (Live) (Neeson, J Brewster, R Brewster) - 4:41

== Personnel ==
- Doc Neeson – lead vocals
- Rick Brewster – lead guitar
- Bob Spencer – rhythm guitar, backing vocals
- James Morley – bass guitar, backing vocals
- Brent Eccles – drums

Production

- Terry Manning - producers (tracks: 1 & 2)

== Charts ==
=== Weekly charts ===
Chart (1990)	Peak position
Australia (ARIA)	23
New Zealand (Recorded Music NZ)	29

=== Year-end charts ===
Chart (1990)	Peak position
Australia (ARIA Charts)	90
