= Howling (The Angels album) =

Studio album by The Angels
- Released: October 1986
- Recorded: 1986
- Studio: Rhinoceros Studios, Sydney, Australia
- Genre: Hard rock
- Length: 48:25
- Label: Mushroom
- Producer: Steve Brown

The Angels chronology
The Angels' Greatest Vol. II (1985)	Howling (1986)	Live Line (1987)

Singles from Howling
- 1. "Nature of the Beast" Released: July 1986; 2. "Don't Waste My Time" Released: 20 October 1986; 3. "We Gotta Get out of This Place" Released: December 1986; 4. "Can't Take Any More" Released: April 1987

Professional ratings
Review scores
Source	Rating
Collector's Guide to Heavy Metal	7/10

Howling is the eighth studio album by Australian hard rock band The Angels, released in October 1986. The album charted at number 6 in Australia and it peaked at number 10 in New Zealand.

== Track listing ==
Credits adapted from the original LP release.

Side one
No.	Title	Writer(s)	Length
1.	"Did You Hurt Somebody"	Doc Neeson, Richard Brewster, Bob Spencer, Brent Eccles, Jim Hilbun, Steve Brown	3:59
2.	"When the Time Comes"	Neeson, John Brewster, R. Brewster	2:56
3.	"Don't Waste My Time"	Spencer, R. Brewster	3:55
4.	"Can't Take Any More"	R. Brewster, Eccles	3:22
5.	"Where Do You Run"	Neeson, R. Brewster, Brown	3:21
6.	"Man There"	R. Brewster	5:06

Side two
No.	Title	Writer(s)	Length
7.	"Hide Your Face"	R. Brewster	3:54
8.	"We Gotta Get Out of This Place" (The Animals cover)	Barry Mann, Cynthia Weil	4:43
9.	"Standing over You"	R. Brewster, Eccles	3:09
10.	"Stonewall"	J. Brewster, Eccles, R. Brewster	4:14
11.	"All Night for You"	Neeson, Geoffrey Leib	3:15
12.	"Nature of the Beast"	Neeson, Leib	4:22

== Personnel ==
The Angels

- Doc Neeson – lead vocals
- Rick Brewster – lead guitar, percussion on "Don't Waste My Time"
- Bob Spencer – rhythm guitar, backing vocals
- Jim Hilbun – bass guitar, saxophone, backing vocals, organ on "Did You Hurt Somebody", percussion on "Don't Waste My Time"
- Brent Eccles – drums

Additional musicians

- Eddie Rayner – keyboards
- Swami Brown – percussion on "Don't Waste My Time"
- Mary Azzopardi – backing vocals on "Hide Your Face" and "Can't Take Anymore"
- Bridget O'Donoghue – backing vocals on "Hide Your Face" and "Can't Take Anymore"
- Greg Thorne – trumpet on "Standing over You" and "Don't Waste My Time"
- Tony Buchanan – tenor and baritone saxophones on "Standing over You" and "Don't Waste My Time"
- Herbie Canon – trombone on "Standing over You" and "Don't Waste My Time"

Production

- Steve Brown – producer
- Andrew Scott, Al Wright – engineers
- Heidi Cannova – assistant engineer
- Bill Price – mixing at Wessex Sound Studios, London
- Deitmar – mixing assistant

== Charts ==
=== Weekly charts ===
Weekly chart performance for Howling
Chart (1986–87)	Peak position
Australian Albums (Kent Music Report)	6
New Zealand Albums (RMNZ)	10

=== Year-end charts ===
Year-end chart performance for Howling
Chart (1987)	Position
New Zealand Albums (RMNZ)	42

== Certifications ==
Certifications for Howling
Region	Certification	Certified units/sales
Australia (ARIA)	Platinum	70,000^{^}
^{^} Shipments figures based on certification alone.
