= Let the Night Roll On =

Single by The Angels

from the album Beyond Salvation
- Released: January 1990
- Genre: Hard rock
- Length: 4:04 (single version); 4:58 (album version)
- Label: Mushroom Records
- Songwriter(s): Doc Neeson, Richard Brewster, Amanda Miller
- Producer(s): Terry Manning

The Angels singles chronology
"Finger on the Trigger" (1988)	"Let the Night Roll On" (1990)	"Dogs Are Talking" (1990)

"Let the Night Roll On" is a song by Australian hard rock band the Angels, released in January 1990 as the lead single from The Angels ninth studio album Beyond Salvation. "Let the Night Roll On" peaked at number 17 on the ARIA Charts.

== Track listing ==
7-inch single (Mushroom K 1044)

1. Let the Night Roll On (Doc Neeson, Richard Brewster, Amanda Miller) – 4:03
2. Junk City (Neeson, Bob Spencer, Brewster) – 6:23

12-inch single

1. Let the Night Roll On (Neeson, Brewster, Miller) – 4:58
2. Junk City (Neeson, Spencer, Brewster) – 6:23

== Personnel ==
- Doc Neeson – lead vocals
- Rick Brewster – lead guitar
- Bob Spencer – rhythm guitar, backing vocals
- James Morley – bass guitar, backing vocals
- Brent Eccles – drums

Production

- Terry Manning – producer (tracks: 1–2)

== Charts ==
=== Weekly charts ===
Chart (1990)	Peak position
Australia (ARIA)	17

=== Year-end charts ===
Chart (1990)	Peak position
Australian (ARIA Charts)	97
