= Their Finest Hour... and Then Some =

Their Finest Hour...And Then Some (Greatest Hits)

Greatest hits album by The Angels
- Released: October 1992
- Genre: Hard rock
- Length: 56:03
- Label: Albert/Festival Mushroom

The Angels chronology
Red Back Fever / Left Hand Drive (1992)	Their Finest Hour...And Then Some (Greatest Hits) (1992)	Evidence (1994)

Their Finest Hour... and Then Some is a greatest hits album by Australian hard rock group The Angels, released in October 1992. The album peaked at number 76 of the ARIA Albums Chart.

== Track listing ==
All tracks are written by Bernard Patrick Neeson, John Carrington Brewster-Jones and Richard Brewster-Jones, unless otherwise indicated

Original release (472250 2)
No.	Title	Length
1.	"Am I Ever Gonna See Your Face Again"	4:04
2.	"Comin' Down"	3:21
3.	"I Ain't The One"	2:30
4.	"After The Rain"	3:10
5.	"Love Takes Care"	3:42
6.	"Straightjacket"	3:19
7.	"Take A Long Line"	3:01
8.	"Be With You"	3:43
9.	"Marseilles"	4:49
10.	"Shadow Boxer"	2:41
11.	"No Exit"	6:33
12.	"Waiting for the World"	3:23
13.	"Can't Shake It"	4:53
14.	"Out of the Blue"	3:19
15.	"Mr. Damage"	3:38

Bonus tracks

No.	Title	Writer(s)	Length
16.	"Open That Door"		3:52
17.	"Who Rings the Bell (Studio Version)"	Richard Brewster-Jones, Graham Leslie Bidstrup	3:18
18.	"Whitest Lady"		5:34
19.	"Am I Ever Gonna See Your Face Again (original single version)"		3:19

== Notes ==
Part of the Alberts Classic Series reissues. Songs 16 - 19 are bonus tracks

== Personnel ==
Credited to:

- Chris Bailey – bass guitar
- Graham "Buzz" Bidstrup – drums
- John Brewster – guitar
- Rick Brewster – rhythm guitar
- Doc Neeson – lead vocals

== Charts ==
Chart (1992)	Peak position
Australian (ARIA)	76
