= You're a Lady Now =

Single by The Angels

from the album The Angels
- Released: 4 July 1977
- Genre: Hard rock
- Length: 3:30
- Label: Albert, Mushroom
- Songwriter(s): Doc Neeson, John Brewster, Rick Brewster
- Producer(s): Harry Vanda; George Young

The Angels singles chronology
"Am I Ever Gonna See Your Face Again" (1976)	"You're a Lady Now" (1977)	"Comin' Down" (1978)

"You're a Lady Now" is a song by Australian hard rock group The Angels, released in July 1977 as the second and final single from their self-titled debut album.

The song first charted on 8 August 1977 where it peaked at number 90 on the Kent Music Report.

== Track listing ==
AP 11479
No.	Title	Writer(s)	Length
1.	"You're A Lady Now"	Doc Neeson, John Brewster, Rick Brewster	3:30
2.	"Can't Get Lucky"	Graham Throckman, John Brewster	3:12

== Personnel ==
The Angels members

- Chris Bailey – bass guitar
- Buzz Throckman – drums
- John Brewster – rhythm guitar, backing vocals
- Rick Brewster – lead guitar
- Doc Neeson – lead vocals

Production work

- Producers – Vanda & Young
- Studios – Albert Studios, Sydney

== Charts ==
Chart (1977)	Peak position
Australia (Kent Music Report)	90
