= Left Hand Drive (album) =

Album by Australian rock band The Angels

Studio album by The Angels
- Released: November 2000
- Recorded: 1984–1992
- Genre: Hard rock
- Length: 48:25
- Label: Shock Records
- Producer: The Angels

The Angels chronology
Live Line - Definitive Digital Remaster (1999)	Left Hand Drive (2000)	Live at the Basement (2005)

Left Hand Drive is a 2000 album by Australian hard rock group The Angels.

== Track listing ==
1. "Don't Waste My Time" – 5:14
2. "Junk City" – 6:22
3. "Dead Man's Shoes" – 4:36
4. "Back Street Pick Up" (Lipstick Remix) – 7:24
5. "Don't Break Me Down" – 4:47
6. "Tear Me Apart" – 3:32
7. "Straight Aces" – 4:01
8. "Blood on the Moon" – 3:00
9. "Take an X" – 6:37
10. "Man There" – 5:04

Liberation release http://www.liberation.com.au/artists/release/Left_Hand_Drive%5B%5D

== Personnel ==
- Doc Neeson - lead vocals
- Rick Brewster - lead guitar
- John Brewster - rhythm guitar, backing vocals
- Jim Hilbun - bass guitar, backing vocals
- Brent Eccles - drums
