= Finger on the Trigger (song) =

"Finger On The Trigger"

Single by The Angels
- Released: November 1988
- Studio: Festival Records
- Genre: Hard rock
- Length: 3:46
- Label: Mushroom Records
- Songwriter(s): Bob Spencer

The Angels singles chronology
"Love Takes Care (live)" (1988)	"Finger On The Trigger" (1988)	"Let the Night Roll On" (1990)

"Finger on the Trigger" is a song by Australian hard rock band The Angels. Released as a non-album single in November 1988, it peaked at number 34 on the ARIA Charts.

== Track listing ==
7-inch single (Mushroom K640)

1. "Finger on the Trigger" (Bob Spencer) – 3:46
2. "Straight Aces" (Doc Neeson, Rick Brewster, Jim Hilbun, Brent Eccles) – 3:56

12-inch single

1. "Finger on the Trigger (Spencer) – 3:46
2. "Straight Aces" (Neeson, Brewster, Hilbun, Eccles) – 3:56
3. "Living in the Bodyguard of Luxury" - 3:56

== Personnel ==
- Rick Brewster – lead and rhythm guitars, vocals
- Doc Neeson – lead vocals
- Brent Eccles – drums
- Jim Hilbun – bass, vocals, saxophone, keyboards
- Bob Spencer – lead guitar, rhythm guitar, vocals

== Charts ==
Chart (1988–1989)	Peak position
Australia (ARIA)	34
