= Skin & Bone (album) =

Studio album by The Angels
- Released: March 1998
- Recorded: 1996–1998
- Studio: Darling Harbour Studios, Sydney, Australia, Denman Lodge, Sony Studios
- Genre: Hard rock
- Length: 47:53
- Label: Shock
- Producer: Rick Brewster

The Angels chronology
Evidence (1994)	Skin & Bone (1998)	Greatest Hits: The Mushroom Years (1999)

Singles from Skin & Bone
- 1. "Call That Living" Released: July 1996; 2. "Caught in the Night" Released: October 1997; 3. "Northwest Highway" Released: 1997; 4. "My Light Will Shine" Released: 1998

Professional ratings
Review scores
Source	Rating
Collector's Guide to Heavy Metal	9/10

Skin & Bone is the eleventh studio album by The Angels, released in March 1998 and reached No. 29 on the ARIA Albums Chart.

== Track listing ==
All tracks are written by Doc Neeson, Richard Brewster, Jim Hilbun, except where noted

No.	Title	Writer(s)	Length
1.	"Northwest Highway"	Neeson, R. Brewster, Brent Eccles, Hilbun	3:15
2.	"Skin & Bone"	Neeson, R. Brewster	3:07
3.	"Caught in the Night"		4:05
4.	"With or Without You"		2:58
5.	"Invisible Man"		4:19
6.	"Wasteland"		4:40
7.	"What the Hell Is Going On"	Neeson, R. Brewster, Hilbun, Eccles	4:13
8.	"World Stops Turning"	Eccles, R. Brewster, Hilbun	4:44
9.	"My Light Will Shine"	Neeson, John Brewster, R. Brewster	4:28
10.	"Soul Surgeon"	Neeson, R. Brewster, Eccles, Hilbun	3:41
11.	"Call That Living"		3:01
12.	"Movin' On"		5:21
Total length:			47:53

== Personnel ==
The Angels

- Doc Neeson – lead vocals
- Rick Brewster – lead guitar, producer, engineer
- John Brewster – rhythm guitar, backing vocals
- Jim Hilbun – bass guitar, backing vocals
- Brent Eccles – drums

Production

- Mike Duffy, Julian Slade – engineers
- Kevin Shirley – mixing
- Ted Jensen – mastering

== Charts ==
Chart (1998)	Peak position
Australian Albums (ARIA)	27
