= The Angels' Greatest Vol. II =

The Angels Greatest Hits Vol. II

Greatest hits album by The Angels
- Released: November 1985
- Genre: Hard rock
- Length: 51:47
- Label: Epic Records
- Producer: The Angels

The Angels chronology
Two Minute Warning (1984)	The Angels Greatest Hits Vol. II (1985)	Howling (1986)

The Angels' Greatest Vol. II is the second compilation album by Australian hard rock group, the Angels, which was released in November 1985 via Epic Records. It peaked at No. 38 on the Kent Music Report Albums Chart. The album was re-released in 1998 by Shock Records as No Secrets.

== Track listing ==
All songs written by Doc Neeson, John Brewster & Rick Brewster except as noted.

No.	Title	Writer(s)	Length
1.	"No Secrets"	Doc Neeson, Graham Bidstrup	4:18
2.	"Face The Day"	Doc Neeson, John Brewster, Rick Brewster	4:03
3.	"Watch The Red"	Doc Neeson, John Brewster, Rick Brewster, Graham Bidstrup	5:04
4.	"Fashion And Fame"	Doc Neeson, John Brewster, Rick Brewster	4:37
5.	"Devil's Gate"	Doc Neeson, John Brewster, Rick Brewster	5:34
6.	"City Out Of Control"	Doc Neeson, John Brewster, Rick Brewster	5:50
7.	"Live Lady Live"	Doc Neeson, John Brewster, Rick Brewster	3:14
8.	"Eat City"	Doc Neeson, John Brewster, Rick Brewster	3:24
9.	"No Sleep In Hell"	Doc Neeson, John Brewster, Rick Brewster	5:37
10.	"Into The Heat"	Doc Neeson, John Brewster, Rick Brewster	3:06
11.	"Easy Prey"	Doc Neeson, John Brewster, Rick Brewster	3:42
12.	"Stand Up"	Doc Neeson, John Brewster, Rick Brewster	3:18
Total length:			51:47

== Personnel ==
- Producer – The Angels
- Producer [Consultants] – Vanda & Young
- Producer, Engineer – Mark Opitz
- Vocals – Doc Neeson
- Bass – Chris Bailey
- Vocals, Drums – Graham "Buzz" Bidstrup
- Vocals, Guitar [Lead] – Rick Brewster
- Vocals, Rhythm Guitar – John Brewster
- Written-By – Doc Neeson (tracks: 1, 2, 3, 4, 5, 6, 7, 8, 9, 10 to 11, 12) John Brewster, Rick Brewster (tracks: 1,2, 3, 4, 5, 6, 7, 8, to 9, 10, 11, 12)

== Charts ==
Chart (1985/86)	Peak position
Australian (Kent Music Report)	38
