= Finger on the Trigger =

Finger on the Trigger may refer to:

- Finger on the Trigger (film), a 1965 western film directed by Sidney W. Pink
- "Love Is in Control (Finger on the Trigger)", first single from Donna Summer's self-titled 1982 album
- "Finger on the Trigger" (song), a 1988 song by The Angels
- "Finger on the Trigger", a bonus track on the CD reissue of Raven's 1987 album Life's a Bitch
