= Watch the Red =

Studio album by The Angels
- Released: May 1983
- Recorded: 1982–1983
- Studio: Rhinoceros Studios, Sydney, Australia
- Genre: Hard rock
- Length: 38:23
- Label: Epic
- Producer: The Angels and Andrew Scott

The Angels chronology
Night Attack (1981)	Watch the Red (1983)	Two Minute Warning (1984)

Singles from Watch the Red
- 1. "Stand Up" Released: November 1982; 2. "Eat City" Released: March 1983; 3. "Live Lady Live" Released: June 1983; 4. "Is That You?" Released: 1983

Professional ratings
Review scores
Source	Rating
Collector's Guide to Heavy Metal	5/10

Watch the Red is the sixth studio album by Australian hard rock band The Angels. It was released in May 1983. The album charted at number 6 in Australia and number 43 in New Zealand.

In June 2002, Shock Records issued The Complete Sessions 1980 - 1983. The 4-CD box set included remasters of Dark Room (9 bonus tracks), Night Attack (9 bonus tracks), Watch The Red (5 bonus tracks) and The Blow (2-CD set of material from a 40-minute jam-session which formed the basis of Watch the Red). In June 2006, Liberation Music re-issued Dark Room from The Complete Sessions 1980 - 1983.

== Track listings ==
Credits adapted from the original releases.

Side one
No.	Title	Writer(s)	Length
1.	"Live Lady Live"	Doc Neeson, Lauren Haefer, Richard Brewster	3:13
2.	"Eat City"	Neeson, R. Brewster	3:22
3.	"Shoot It Up"	Neeson, John Brewster, R. Brewster	3:30
4.	"Easy Prey"	Bitsy Brewster, J. Brewster, R. Brewster	3:41
5.	"Bow Wow"	J. Brewster, R. Brewster, Brent Eccles, Jim Hilbun	2:22
6.	"No Sleep in Hell"	Neeson, J. Brewster, R. Brewster	5:33

Side two
No.	Title	Writer(s)	Length
7.	"Watch the Red"	Neeson, J. Brewster, R. Brewster	5:02
8.	"The Zoo / Name Dropping"	Neeson, J. Brewster, R. Brewster, Eccles, Hilbun	3:58
9.	"Stand Up"	Hilbun	3:15
10.	"Is That You?"	Neeson, J. Brewster, R. Brewster	3:37
11.	"Stay Away"	Neeson, J. Brewster, R. Brewster, Eccles, Hilbun	4:16

2006 Remastered edition bonus tracks
No.	Title	Writer(s)	Length
12.	"Breakdown"	Neeson, J. Brewster, R. Brewster	4:27
13.	"Take It on the Run"	Neeson, J. Brewster, R. Brewster	3:48
14.	"Say What"	Neeson, J. Brewster, R. Brewster	5:15
15.	"Live Lady Live, Part 2"	Neeson, R. Brewster, Haefer	4:35
16.	"Let Me In"	Neeson, R. Brewster	6:03
Total length:			62:31

2006 Remastered edition CD2 – "The Blow"
No.	Title	Length
1.	"Don't Wanna Be No More (In My Life)"	4:46
2.	"Never Know My Name"	0:36
3.	"How Long Can I?"	1:57
4.	"Name Dropping"	0:48
5.	"The Zoo"	3:56
6.	"Bow Wow"	1:55
7.	"Where's Doc?"	4:12
8.	"Electric Drill (Don't Do It Honey)"	4:23
9.	"Stay Away"	6:13
Total length:		28:46

== Personnel ==
The Angels

- Doc Neeson – lead vocals
- Rick Brewster – lead guitar, piano, accordion
- John Brewster – rhythm guitar, lead vocals on "No Sleep in Hell"
- Jim Hilbun – bass guitar, vocals, saxophone, organ, piano
- Brent Eccles – drums

Production

- Andrew Scott – producer, engineer, mixing
- Al Wright – engineer
- Otto Ruiter – mastering

== Charts ==
Chart (1983)	Peak position
Australian Albums (Kent Music Report)	6
New Zealand Albums (RMNZ)	43

== Certifications ==
Region	Certification	Certified units/sales
Australia (ARIA)	Gold	20,000^{^}
^{^} Shipments figures based on certification alone.
