= Two Minute Warning =

Two Minute Warning may refer to:

- Two-minute warning, a timing rule in American football
- Two-Minute Warning, a 1976 action thriller film
- Two Minute Warning (album), a 1985 album by the Angels
- "Two Minute Warning", a 1983 song by Depeche Mode from Construction Time Again
