= Tour of Duty – Concert for the Troops =

1999 benefit concert in Dili, East Timor

Tour of Duty Concert for the Troops
- Genre: Pop / Rock / Country
- Dates: 21 December 1999
- Locations: National Stadium, Dili, East Timor
- Coordinates: 8°33′29″S 125°34′50″E
- Founders: Doc Neeson
- Attendance: 4,000
- Organiser: Glenn Wheatley

Tour of Duty – Concert for the Troops was a benefit concert held on 21 December 1999 in Dili, East Timor, for the Australian troops serving with the International Force for East Timor (INTERFET).

The concert was a special Christmas present to show appreciation and support for the troops stationed in East Timor, away from their families for Christmas. It was held at Dili Stadium in front of 4000 troops from INTERFET countries, and also broadcast in Australia. Some of the troops in the audience held up signs with well wishes for their families back home.

Singer-songwriter and musician Doc Neeson initiated the concert, and it was organised by music promoter Glenn Wheatley. Comedy duo Roy and HG were the comperes. Featured acts included John Farnham, Kylie Minogue, Doc Neeson, Gina Jeffreys, James Blundell, The Living End, Dili Allstars and the RMC Band.

Neeson participated in the concert despite having been involved earlier in the month in a serious traffic accident in Australia, in which he had suffered severe whiplash and serious nerve damage to his neck and spine. During the concert, he performed a number of The Angels tracks and duets with Farnham, Minogue and The Living End.

The concert was supported by the Australian entertainment industry and sponsors, some of which supplied products for inclusion in 'Dili Bags' to be given to attending troops. Donations were also sought from the Australian public, on the basis that money raised from public sponsorship would be donated to CARE Australia to assist with its activities in East Timor.

From the concert, an album with the following tracks was produced:

1. "She's So Fine" / "Sorry" - John Farnham and Doc Neeson
2. "Mambo No.5" - R.M.C. Band
3. "Way Out West" - James Blundell
4. "Have Yourself A Merry Little Christmas" - Gina Jeffreys
5. "Santa Baby" - Kylie Minogue
6. "You'll Never Walk Alone" - John Farnham
7. "Shadow Boxer" - Doc Neeson
8. "No Secrets" - Doc Neeson and Living End
9. "All Torn Down" - The Living End
10. "Jingle Bell Rock" - Kylie Minogue and The Living End
11. "Shout" - John Farnham and Kylie Minogue
12. "Have a Little Faith (In Me)" - John Farnham
13. "Chain Reaction" - John Farnham
14. "Silent Night" - Rachael Starkey (RMC Band)
15. "I Still Call Australia Home" - Everyone
16. "You're the Voice" - Everyone
17. "It's a Long Way to the Top" - Everyone
18. "Take a Long Line" - Everyone

The album was released for the first time on 25 April 2024.
