= Night Attack (album) =

Studio album by The Angels
- Released: November 1981
- Studio: EMI 301 Studio, Sydney, Australia
- Genre: Hard rock
- Length: 38:23
- Label: Epic
- Producer: Ed Thacker, John Brewster, Rick Brewster

The Angels chronology
Dark Room (1980)	Night Attack (1981)	Watch the Red (1983)

Singles from Night Attack
- 1. "Night Attack" Released: January 1982; 2. "Living on the Outside" Released: 1982

Night Attack is the fifth studio album by Australian band The Angels, it was released in November 1981 through Epic Records. The album peaked at No. 11 on the National albums chart. For the 1982 American release of Night Attack by Epic Records, they used the band name Angel City.

In June 2002, Shock Records issued The Complete Sessions 1980 - 1983. The 4-CD box set included remasters of Dark Room (9 bonus tracks), Night Attack (9 bonus tracks), Watch The Red (5 bonus tracks) and The Blow (2-CD set). In June 2006, Liberation Music re-issued Night Attack from The Complete Sessions 1980 - 1983. The album peaked at number 13 on the ARIA Charts and it also charted at number 14 on the Recorded Music NZ.

== Reception ==
Professional ratings
Review scores
Source	Rating
Collector's Guide to Heavy Metal	7/10

== Track listings ==
All tracks written by John Brewster (as John Brewster-Jones), Rick Brewster (as Richard Brewster-Jones), Doc Neeson (as Bernard Neeson) unless otherwise indicated.

Australian 1981 release

Side one

1. "Long Night" – 4:12
2. "Runnin' Wild" – 4:19
3. "Fashion and Fame" – 4:38
4. "City Out of Control" – 5:55

Side two

1. "Night Attack" (J. Brewster, R. Brewster, Neeson, Brent Eccles) – 3:31
2. "Nothin' to Win" – 4:14
3. "Living on the Outside" – 4:20
4. "Talk About You" (J. Brewster, R. Brewster, Neeson, Eccles) – 3:29
5. "Storm the Bastille" (J. Brewster, R. Brewster, Neeson, Chris Bailey) – 3:43

Bonus tracks on 2002 Shock Records release

10. "Casablanca" – 4:18
11. "Small Talk" – 3:31
12. "Back on You" – 3:05
13. "Chaplin's Drum" – 3:22
14. "Fashion and Fame" (live) – 4:40
15. "Talk About You" (live) (J. Brewster, R. Brewster, Neeson, Eccles) – 3:31
16. "Bad Dream" (live) (J. Brewster, R. Brewster, Neeson, Bailey) – 4:20
17. "Angel" (live) – 4:46
18. "Devil's Gate" (live) – 5:51

Professional ratings
Review scores
Source	Rating
Collector's Guide to Heavy Metal	7/10

== Personnel ==
The Angels / Angel City members

- Doc Neeson – lead vocals
- Rick Brewster – lead guitar, producer, mixing at Cherokee Studios, Los Angeles
- John Brewster – rhythm guitar, harmonica, vocals, producer, mixing
- Chris Bailey – bass guitar, vocals
- Brent Eccles – drums

Production

- Ed Thacker – producer, engineer, mixing
- Paul Ray – assistant engineer
- Greg Calbi – mastering at Sterling Sound, New York
- Bob King – photography
- J. Brewster, R. Brewster, Peter McIan – producers on bonus tracks

2006 re-issue

- Don Bartley, R. Brewster – remastering
- David Williams – reissue coordinator, track selector
- R. Brewster – compilation
- Glenn A. Baker, R. Brewster, Brent Eccles – liner notes

== Charts ==
Chart (1981–82)	Peak position
Australian Albums (Kent Music Report)	13
New Zealand Albums (RMNZ)	14
US Billboard 200	174

== Certifications ==
Region	Certification	Certified units/sales
Australia (ARIA)	Platinum	50,000^{^}
^{^} Shipments figures based on certification alone.
