= Two Minute Warning (album) =

Studio album by The Angels
- Released: November 28, 1984
- Recorded: May – July 1984
- Studio: Record Plant (Los Angeles, California); A&M (Hollywood, California); MCA Whitney (Los Angeles, California); Studios 301 (Sydney, Australia)
- Genre: Hard rock
- Length: 38:23
- Label: Mushroom
- Producer: Ashley Howe

The Angels chronology
Watch the Red (1983)	Two Minute Warning (1984)	The Angels' Greatest Vol. II (1985)

Singles from Two Minute Warning
- 1. "Between the Eyes" Released: October 1984; 2. "Look the Other Way" Released: February 1985; 3. "Sticky Little Bitch" Released: April 1985; 4. "Underground" Released: June 1985

Professional ratings
Review scores
Source	Rating
Collector's Guide to Heavy Metal	9/10

Two Minute Warning is the seventh studio album by Australian rock band The Angels, released on 28 November 1984. It was subsequently released in the United States in January 1985, under the alias Angel City. The album peaked at number 5 in Australia and number 31 in New Zealand.

== Track listing ==
Credits adapted from the original LP release.

Side one

1. "Small Price" (Richard Brewster, Brent Eccles, John Brewster) – 5:24
2. "Look the Other Way" (R.Brewster, Doc Neeson, J. Brewster, Eccles) – 4:29
3. "Underground" (R. Brewster, Neeson, J.Brewster) – 5:30
4. "Front Page News" (R. Brewster, Eccles) – 3:32
5. "Gonna Leave You" (R. Brewster, Neeson, J.Brewster) – 3:07

Side two

1. "Between the Eyes" (R. Brewster, Eccles) – 3:56
2. "Babylon" (J. Brewster, Neeson, Eccles) – 5:18
3. "Sticky Little Bitch" (R. Brewster, Neeson, J.Brewster) – 2:55
4. "Razor's Edge" (R.Brewster, Neeson, J. Brewster, Eccles) – 4:30
5. "Run for the Shelter" (R. Brewster, Eccles) – 3:37

== Personnel ==
The Angels

- Doc Neeson – lead vocals
- Rick Brewster – lead guitar, backing vocals, producer on "Run for the Shelter"
- John Brewster – rhythm guitar, backing vocals, producer on "Run for the Shelter", mixing
- Jim Hilbun – bass guitar, backing vocals
- Brent Eccles – drums

Additional musicians

- Steve Forman – percussion

Production

- Ashley Howe – producer, arranger, engineer, mixing on tracks 1 and 3
- Lee De Carlo – engineer
- Paul Wertheimer, Benny Saccone, Doug Schwartz – assistant engineers
- Spencer Lee – engineer on "Run for the Shelter"
- Jim Taig – mixing
- Warren Dewey – mixing on tracks 1 and 3
- Clark Germain – mixing assistant on tracks 1 and 3

== Charts ==
Chart (1985)	Peak position
Australian Albums (Kent Music Report)	5
New Zealand Albums (RMNZ)	31
