= Tony! The Tony Blair Rock Opera =

Musical by Harry Hill and Steve Brown

TONY!
- [The Tony Blair Rock Opera]
- Production poster
- Music: Steve Brown
- Lyrics: Steve Brown
- Book: Harry Hill
- Basis: The life of Tony Blair
- Premiere: 8 June 2022: Park Theatre, London
- Productions: 2022 London; 2023 UK tour

TONY! [The Tony Blair Rock Opera] is a musical comedy by Harry Hill and Steve Brown based on the life of former Prime Minister of the United Kingdom, Tony Blair.

== Production history ==
The musical was originally announced to be presented at the Turbine Theatre in 2021 during the MT Fest UK. However, due to the COVID-19 pandemic, it was presented virtually. The cast included Jenna Boyd, Scott Garnham, Gemma Knight Jones, Marie Lawrence, Simon Lipkin, Nicola Sloane and Paul Thornley.

Directed by Peter Rowe, the production made its world premiere at the Park Theatre, London, beginning previews from 2 June with a press night on 8 June running until 9 July 2022.

Following the success of the Park Theatre production, the musical played a limited run at the Leicester Square Theatre from 15 April to 21 May 2023 before embarking on a UK tour. A live cast recording was released having been recorded at The Lowry, Salford during the UK tour.

== Musical numbers ==
Act I

- "Tony" (Intro: Prepare Parts 1 & 2)"
- "Tony" (Reprise: Rewind)
- "New Messiah"
- "Tony" (Reprise: Hear Ye)
- "I'm Gonna Be Somebody
- "Tony" (Reprise: Whistle)
- "She's A Lady / He's My Baby"
- "Macroeconomics"
- "Well Alright"
- "New Labour" (Part 1)
- "New Labour" (Part 2)
- "The Princess And The Pop Prime Minister"
- "The People's Princess"
- "Tony" (Reprise: Tony)

Act II

- "Tony" (Reprise: Mark Well)
- "Kill The Infidel"
- "I Never Done Anything Wrong"
- "Bombs Away! / Trio"
- "Tony" (Reprise: And Lo)
- "Special Relationship"
- "Tony" (Reprise: Alas)
- "The People's Princess" (Reprise)
- "Sex It Up"
- "Bombs Away!"
- "Tony" (Reprise: 'Tis Done)
- "He's A Liar"
- "The Whole Wide World"

== Cast and characters ==
Character	Park Theatre	UK tour
Character	2022	2023
Tony Blair	Charlie Baker	Jack Whittle
Peter Mandelson	Howard Samuels	Howard Samuels
Cherie Blair	Holly Sumpton	Tori Burgess
Gordon Brown	Gary Trainor	Phil Sealey
Neil Kinnock	Martin Johnston	Martin Johnston
John Prescott	Rosie Strobel	Rosie Strobel
Robin Cook	Kaye Brown	Sally Cheng
Diana, Princess of Wales	Madison Swan	Emma Jay Thomas
