= The Angels (album) =

Studio album by The Angels
- Released: August 1977
- Recorded: 1976–1977
- Studios: Albert Studios, Sydney
- Genre: Hard rock
- Length: 41:13
- Label: Albert
- Producers: Harry Vanda, George Young

The Angels chronology
The Angels (1977)	Face to Face (1978)

Singles from The Angels
- 1. "Am I Ever Gonna See Your Face Again" Released: 1 March 1976; 2. "You're a Lady Now" Released: July 1977

The Angels is the first album by Australian hard rock band, The Angels, which was released in August 1977. It was produced by Vanda & Young (The Easybeats) at Sydney's Albert Studios. It included a re-recorded version of their debut single, "Am I Ever Gonna See Your Face Again" (March 1976) and provided their second single, "You're a Lady Now", in July 1977. By the mid-1980s "Am I Ever Gonna See Your Face Again" had developed a cult status with the audience responding with "No way, get fucked, fuck off!"

== Background ==
The Angels is the debut album by Australian hard rockers, The Angels, which was issued in August 1977. The group's line up, from January that year, were Chris Bailey on bass guitar; Graham Bidstrup (aka Buzz Throckman) on drums; John Brewster on rhythm guitar and backing vocals; his brother, Rick Brewster on lead guitar; and Bernard "Doc" Neeson on lead vocals.

The group had supported AC/DC in early 1976 and were signed by their producers, Vanda & Young, to Albert Productions record label. On 1 March that year The Angels had issued their debut single, "Am I Ever Gonna See Your Face Again", which was produced by Vanda & Young. The band then recorded their debut album at Albert Studio with Vanda & Young producing, again. Six of the ten tracks were co-written by the Brewster brothers with Neeson.

Ahead of the album's appearance they released their second single, "You're a Lady Now", in July 1977. The album followed in the next month in both LP and cassette formats. By the mid-1980s "Am I Ever Gonna See Your Face Again" had developed a cult status with audiences responding with "No way, get fucked, fuck off!". In February 1988 the group released a live version of the single, which included this chant, and marketed T-shirts sporting the phrase.

== Reception ==
Professional ratings
Review scores
Source	Rating
AllMusic	3/5 stars

== Track listing ==
All tracks are written by John Brewster (as John Carrington Brewster-Jones), Rick Brewster (as Richard Brewster-Jones), and Bernard "Doc" Neeson (as Bernard Patrick Neeson); except where noted

Side one
No.	Title	Length
1.	"Take Me Home" (J. Brewster, R. Brewster, Neeson, Graham Bidstrup)	4:52
2.	"You're a Lady Now"	3:35
3.	"Goin' Down" (William Donald Nix)	4:11
4.	"Shelter from the Rain" (J. Brewster, Bidstrup)	4:03
5.	"Can't Get Lucky" (J. Brewster, Bidstrup)	3:17

Side two
No.	Title	Length
6.	"Am I Ever Gonna See Your Face Again" (album version)	4:04
7.	"You Got Me Runnin'"	4:55
8.	"High on You"	3:38
9.	"Hot Lucy"	4:29
10.	"Dreambuilder"	4:09
Total length:		41:13

== Personnel ==
The Angels members

- Doc Neeson – lead vocals
- Rick Brewster – lead guitar
- John Brewster – rhythm guitar, backing vocals
- Chris Bailey – bass guitar
- Buzz Throckman – drums

=== Production ===
- Producers – Vanda & Young
- Studios – Albert Studios, Sydney

== Charts ==
Chart performance for The Angels
Chart (1992)	Peak position
Australian Albums (ARIA)	198
