= John Woodruff (talent manager) =

Australian talent manager

John Woodruff OAM
- Born: John Philip Woodruff
- Occupations: Talent manager; record label owner; music magazine owner
- Years active: 1973–2018

John Philip Woodruff is an Australian former talent manager, record label owner and music magazine owner. He managed Flowers/Icehouse, the Angels, Diesel, Baby Animals and Savage Garden. He combined with fellow managers to found Dirty Pool as a booking agency and management company in 1978. Woodruff established a magazine The Music Network in 1994. For his work in the local music industry he was awarded a Lifetime Achievement Award at the ARIA Music Awards of 2007. He was described by music journalist Christie Eliezer as one of seven movers and shakers of the Australian Music Industry in the book High Voltage Rock 'n' Roll (2007). On Australia Day (26 January) 2008, Woodruff was awarded a Medal of the Order of Australia for "service to the popular music industry, particularly as a manager, promoter and mentor of musical acts." He retired in December 2018 after selling his management company to Sony Music Australia.

== Biography ==
John Philip Woodruff was a talent manager of two covers bands, Moonshine Jug and String Band and Orange, in Adelaide in the early 1970s, which eventually became the Angels and Cold Chisel, respectively. He established the Sphere Organisation, which included a record label. Moonshine Jug and String Band issued a four-track extended play Keep You on the Move in mid-1973 and followed with a single "That's All Right for Me" (1974), both on his Sphere label. Late in 1974 they changed their name to the Keystone Angels and released a single, "Keep On Dancin'" (1975), which was co-produced by Woodruff and the group.

Woodruff and fellow managers, Ray Hearn, Richard McDonald and Rod Willis, founded Dirty Pool Live Presentation in Sydney in 1978 as a booking agency and management company. Willis was now managing Cold Chisel and Hearn handled the Angels – both bands were concerned that various booking agencies were taking the lion's share of profits from their live music performances. At that time "performers were only paid on a minimal fee basis and the venue promoter took most of the money". McDonald recalled "There was no control over cover charges or promotion and, most important, no control of the marketing of the act." Woodruff convinced Flowers (which became Icehouse) to join their roster and worked with their bass guitarist Keith Welsh, who had been doing their bookings. He resumed management of the Angels and remained with them until the 1990s.

From the mid-1980s he managed Johnny Diesel & the Injectors. He helped form Baby Animals in 1989 after seeing lead singer Suze DeMarchi performing in London. To concentrate on Baby Animals he had left the Angels and Johnny Diesel by 1992. He was praised by Baby Animals' members Frank Celenza and Eddie Parise, who told The Canberra Times' Kean Wong that "Woodruff has played an instrumental role in all this success." As the Australian representative for Imago Records he had signed Baby Animals for international releases.

Woodruff co-created a music magazine The Music Network in early 1994 with Welsh and music journalist Anthony O'Grady. According to O'Grady, it started as "a tip sheet... to highlight records that are starting to work at radio and/or retail" before they appeared on the Australian Music Report or ARIA Charts. At the end of 1994 he signed the pop duo Savage Garden to his management company JWM Productions after receiving their demo tape and negotiated a contract with Roadshow Music/Warner Music to record their material. With his wife he took out a loan, using their home as collateral, to fund the recording of the group's debut single, "I Want You" (May 1996). As co-chair of the Australian Music Managers Forum in April 1995 he alerted the local industry to the lack of copyright and transmission rights as the Internet expands, "music, film, articles, anything which is intellectual property needs another set of rules for protection".

In February 1998 he provided a submission to the Australian federal government's inquiry into Copyright Amendment Bill (No. 2) 1997 with particular reference to parallel imports of Savage Garden material. The group were the highest earning Australian entertainers for 1998 according to Adele Ferguson et al of Business Review Weekly at $35 million. After Savage Garden disbanded in 2001 he continued managing the group's assets including their back catalogue. His later clients included Evermore, the Butterfly Effect, Kisschasy and Small Mercies.

For his work in the local music industry Woodruff was awarded a Lifetime Achievement Award at the ARIA Music Awards of 2007. Also in that year he was described in "Chapter 3" of music journalist Christie Eliezer's book High Voltage Rock 'n' Roll: The Movers and Shakers in the Australian Music Industry. On Australia Day (26 January) 2008 he was awarded a Medal of the Order of Australia for "service to the popular music industry, particularly as a manager, promoter and mentor of musical acts." He sold his interests in The Music Network in early 2009 and explained, "[it is] the right time to pass on the flame... into the hands of a company which sees itself as part of the music industry". Woodruff retired in December 2018 after selling his management company and Savage Garden's back catalogue to Sony Music Australia.
