= James Morley =

English cricketer (1835–1904)

James Henry Morley (20 December 1835 – 7 April 1904) was an English first-class cricketer active 1865 who played for Middlesex. He was born in Herne Hill, Surrey and died in Hove. He played in one first-class match as a wicketkeeper.
