= Steve Brown (composer) =

British composer (1954–2024)

Steven James Brown (25 October 1954 – 2 February 2024) was a British composer, lyricist, record producer, and arranger.

== Career ==
Although primarily known for his composing, Brown proved himself an adept comic, both in performing and writing. He was a full cast member of the Sony Award winning BBC Radio 4 comedy sketch series In One Ear from 1984 to 1986. Part of his character arc revolved around his complaining (jokingly) that not enough time or attention was given to his musical interludes, and that the rest of the cast got all the funny material.

Brown went on to write many of the songs for the satirical comedy show Spitting Image in the late 1980s and the entirety of the 1990s, originally providing just lyrics and eventually taking over permanently from Philip Pope as house composer/musical director, as well as providing many of the sung impressions. He worked and appeared extensively with Rory Bremner in the 1980s and 1990s, completing UK tours and the BBC series, The Rory Bremner Show. Brown wrote a number of songs for BBC 2's Dead Ringers, appearing briefly as Noel Gallagher with Jon Culshaw singing as Liam Gallagher. He also acted as MD for impressionists Alistair McGowan and Ronni Ancona.

In 1995, he composed the music for The Ant & Dec Show on Children's BBC, and later worked on their SMTV Live programme, for which he wrote the 'Wonky Donkey' jingle, among other themes. He continued to work extensively as a jingle writer for their ITV show Saturday Night Takeaway.

Brown played the fictional bandleader Glen Ponder in the Steve Coogan TV show Knowing Me Knowing You with Alan Partridge, and worked with Coogan thereafter, writing material and appearing as MD on two major UK tours including a West End run at The Lyceum in The Man Who Thinks He Is It, a further UK tour in 2008, The Tony Ferrino Phenomenon special and album and the song "Raped In The Face" for the film Hamlet 2. In April 2018, he worked again with Coogan on the BBC revival of the Alan Partridge character.

Other television shows include Lee Mack's Not Going Out, The Brian Conley Show, BBC1 series New Tricks and Lenny Henry Goes to Town. He wrote songs for the BBC Children's TV shows, Playaway and Play School, and also the long-running ITV show My Parents Are Aliens. CITV's Scrambled! on which Brown provided theme song and numerous jingles. In 2018, transmission began of the adventure game show Spyschool for which he provided theme music and the entire underscore.

As a performer, Brown featured on several radio series including the radio show Jammin' with Roland Rivron and The Lee Mack Show for BBC Radio 2 in which he took part in many of the sketches.

Brown provided all the music and arrangements for British comedian Harry Hill's television, radio, live, recording and film work since 1997, and worked on his ITV TV Burp show as musical director and jingle composer, later providing the same for Harry Hill's Tea Time on Sky and Harry Hill's Alien Fun Capsule for ITV. In 2013, Brown wrote the orchestral score and all original songs for The Harry Hill Movie. Brown arranged and recorded all the music for Hill's 2015 revival of ITV's Stars In Their Eyes.

As a record producer, Brown worked on the triple-platinum-selling album Seasons of My Soul by Rumer, as well as Laura Mvula's Sing to the Moon, both of which were top-ten records on the UK Albums Chart. He also produced Harry Hill's Funny Times and later Little Black Book by Sarah Walk. In 2014, Brown produced four tracks for the Italian singer Noemi on her album Made in London, which peaked at number 2 in the Italian Albums Chart.

Brown composed the score and co-wrote the book and lyrics of the West End musical Spend Spend Spend which starred Barbara Dickson and chronicled Viv Nicholson's rise and fall after winning a fortune in the football pools in the early 1960s. With Harry Hill, he co-wrote I Can't Sing! The X Factor Musical, which premiered at the London Palladium on 5 March 2013. It was jointly produced by Stage Entertainment and Simon Cowell's company Syco. The show starred Nigel Harman as Simon Cowell and Cynthia Erivo as the main contestant. His musical adaptation of It's A Wonderful Life, co-written with Francis Matthews, was staged at the New Wolsey Theatre in Ipswich in 2009. In 2017, the two began work on a new commission, Champion, for the same theatre. In March 2018, Brown completed filming the new ITV panel game, The Imitation Game, appearing with his own six-piece band.

In 2021, Brown and Hill collaborated again on TONY! The Tony Blair Rock Opera. The show was presented virtually as part of the Turbine Theatre's MTFest. In 2022, the show made its world premiere at London's Park Theatre before a run in 2023 at the Edinburgh Festival Fringe, as well as a UK tour.

== Personal life ==
Steven James Brown was born on 25 October 1954. He had two sons, standup comedian Alfie Brown and musician Lenny Brown, from his first marriage to comedy actress and impressionist Jan Ravens, for whom he continued to write material. In 2010, he remarried, to actress Deborah Cornelius; they lived in west London with Cornelius's daughter, Manon.

Steve Brown died from pulmonary fibrosis on 2 February 2024, at the age of 69.
