= The Angels (Australian band) =

Australian rock band

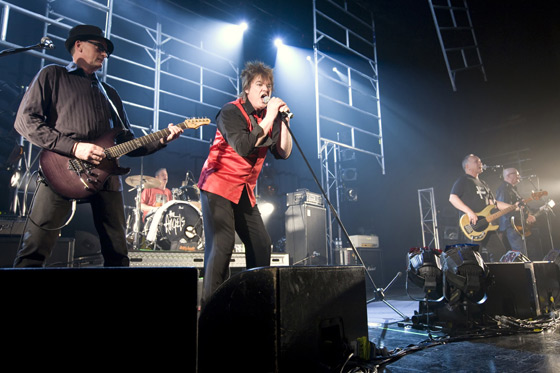
- The Angels at Forum Melbourne, November 2008

Background information
- Also known as: The Keystone Angels; Angel City; The Angels from Angel City
- Origin: Adelaide, South Australia
- Genres: Australian pub rock, hard rock
- Years active: 1974–2000, 2008–present
- Labels: Mushroom; Epic; Liberation; CBS; Alberts; Chrysalis
- Members: Rick Brewster; John Brewster; Nick Norton; Sam Brewster; Tom Brewster
- Past members: Doc Neeson; Charlie King; Graham Bidstrup; Chris Bailey; Brent Eccles; Jim Hilbun; Bob Spencer; James Morley; Dave Gleeson
- Website: theangels.com.au

The Angels are an Australian rock band that formed in 1974 in Adelaide as the Keystone Angels with Bernard "Doc" Neeson on lead vocals and bass guitar, John Brewster on rhythm guitar and vocals, his brother Rick Brewster on lead guitar and backing vocals, and Peter "Charlie" King on drums. In 1976, King was replaced by Graham "Buzz" Bidstrup on drums, Chris Bailey took over bass duties so Neeson could focus solely on vocals, and they changed their name to just 'the Angels'. Their studio albums that peaked in the Australian top 10 are No Exit (1979), Dark Room (1980), Night Attack (1981), Two Minute Warning (1984), Howling (1986) and Beyond Salvation (1990). Their top 20 singles are "No Secrets" (1980), "Into the Heat" (1981), "We Gotta Get Out of This Place" (1987), "Am I Ever Gonna See Your Face Again" (live, 1988), "Let the Night Roll On" and "Dogs Are Talking" (both 1990).

To avoid legal problems with similarly named acts in the international market, their records have been released under the names Angel City and later the Angels from Angel City, although the group has said numerous times that they dislike these names. Bands that have cited the Angels as having influenced their music include Guns N' Roses and Cheap Trick, who became friends and touring buddies, Great White, who have covered two of their songs, and Seattle grunge band Pearl Jam, among many others. Neeson left the group in 1999 due to spinal injuries sustained in a car accident and they disbanded the following year. Competing versions of the group subsequently performed using the Angels name, until April 2008 when the original 1970s line-up reformed for a series of tours until 2011, when Neeson and Bidstrup left again. Alternative versions continued with new members, with the current line-up featuring the founding Brewster brothers, John Brewster's sons Sam (bass) and Tom (drums) and lead vocalist Nick Norton.

The Angels were inducted into the ARIA Hall of Fame in October 1998 with the line-up of Bailey, John and Rick Brewster, Eccles and Neeson. Australian musicologist Ian McFarlane declared that "The Angels had a profound effect on the Australian live music scene of the late 1970s/early 1980s. [They] helped redefine the Australian pub rock tradition... [their] brand of no-frills, hard-driving boogie rock attracted pub goers in unprecedented numbers. In turn, The Angels' shows raised the standard expected of live music. After 20 years on the road, the band showed little sign of easing up on the hard rock fever." Chris Bailey died of throat cancer on 4 April 2013, aged 62. Doc Neeson died of a brain tumour on 4 June 2014, aged 67.

== History ==
=== Early 1970s ===
In November 1970, future member of the Angels, John Brewster on guitar, banjo, harp, backing vocals and washboard, and his younger brother Rick on violin, washboard, jug, backing vocals and percussion formed the Moonshine Jug and String Band, an acoustic ensemble, in Adelaide. Fellow members were Craig Holden on guitar, Bob Petchell on banjo and harp, and Pete Thorpe on tea chest bass, bass guitar, wash tub and backing vocals. In 1971 they were joined by Belfast-born immigrant, Bernard "Doc" Neeson, on guitar and lead vocals (ex-the Innocents), an arts student and former army sergeant, who already performed locally as Doc Talbot. The folk band gigged at local university campuses and cafes. Holden left in 1972.

In 1973, Spencer Tregloan joined Moonshine Jug and String Band on banjo, kazoo, jug, tuba and backing vocals. They released their debut four-track extended play, Keep You on the Move, which made the top 5 in Adelaide. It contained a cover version of Canned Heat's "On the Road Again" and three original tracks: one written by John, one by John and Rick, and one by Neeson. It was followed in 1974 by a single, "That's All Right with Me". Both releases were on the Sphere Organisation label owned by John Woodruff, who later became the Angels' talent manager for two decades. In 2015 the group were inducted into the Adelaide Music Collective Hall of Fame.

In mid-1974, Moonshine Jug and String Band changed their name to the Keystone Angels, with the line up of John Brewster on lead vocals and bass guitar, Rick on guitar, Neeson on bass guitar and vocals, Peter Christopolous (a.k.a. Charlie King) on drums and Laurie Lever on keyboards. They had switched to electric instruments and began playing 1950s rock and roll on the pub circuit. Rick later recalled "There was a cult following with The Jug Band but if we wanted any real success we had to start an electric band. So we threw ourselves in the deep end. I went from playing washboard to playing lead guitar. I hadn't even played an electric guitar before then!"

During July and August 1974, they ran a series of ads in Go-Set, the national teen pop music magazine, announcing that "The Keystone Angels are coming". Lever left during that year. In January 1975, the remaining members performed, as a four-piece, at the Sunbury Pop Festival, then they supported AC/DC during a South Australian tour, and later that year they were the backing band for Chuck Berry. The Keystone Angels issued a sole single, "Keep on Dancin'", on Sphere during that year.

=== Late 1970s: First three albums ===
In 1976, the Angels signed a recording deal with the Albert Productions label, upon the recommendation of Bon Scott and Malcolm Young (from AC/DC). The group dropped "Keystone" from their name to become the Angels and relocated to Sydney with the line-up of Neeson on lead vocals and bass guitar, King on drums, Rick on lead guitar and John Brewster on lead vocals and rhythm guitar. According to Ian McFarlane, an Australian musicologist, the group "had toughened its sound into a unique brand of beefy hard rock."

The Angels' first single, "Am I Ever Gonna See Your Face Again", was released in March 1976, which was produced by Vanda & Young. It was co-written by the Brewsters and Neeson; which is the first of three versions of that they released as singles during their career. They made their TV debut on national pop music show, Countdown. Later that year, King was replaced by Graham "Buzz Throckman" Bidstrup on drums and Chris Bailey (ex-Red Angel Panic, Headband) joined on bass guitar, which allowed Neeson to concentrate on lead vocals. Bailey had also been a member of Mount Lofty Rangers, with Bon Scott, in 1974.

The band's second single, "You're a Lady Now", was released in July 1977, which was followed a month later by their self-titled debut album, The Angels – also produced and recorded by Vanda & Young at Albert Studios, Sydney. It included a re-recorded version of "Am I Ever Gonna See Your Face Again". Most of its ten tracks were co-written by Neeson and the Brewster brothers. Neeson's work as front man allowed the band to develop an energetic and theatrical live presence; he typically appeared on stage as a wild extrovert, dressed in a dinner suit, and sometimes a bow tie, and shaking maracas. As a foil Rick remained motionless and wore sunglasses; he has stated that Beethoven convinced him not to move on stage.

Their second album, Face to Face, was released in June 1978, which reached No. 16 on the Kent Music Report Albums Chart in November and stayed on the charts for 79 weeks. It was accredited as 4× platinum for shipment of 280,000 units. The album was co-produced by the group and Mark Opitz, their sound engineer. All tracks were co-credited to the Brewsters and Neeson. McFarlane described it as a "watershed" release for both the group and Opitz. At the 1978 TV Week King of Pop awards Peter Ledger won Best Australian Album Cover Design Award for his artwork. In October 2010 Face to Face was listed in the book, 100 Best Australian Albums.

By 1978, they "were Australia's highest paid band, attracting record crowds wherever they played. As the consummate frontman, the charismatic Doc Neeson injected a strong theatrical edge into the band's on-stage antics. The Angels were often seen as a punk/new wave outfit, yet the high energy sound, powerful guitar riffing and muscular yet supple rhythm section took the band beyond such easy categorisations." Ed Nimmervoll of Howlspace website opined that the album "delivered a tough blend of punk and metal. The band brought it home on stage behind their theatrical lead singer, jumping and gesturing maniacally, highlighting the drama in the lyrics. In every way they were one of the most exciting bands in the country, and exhaustive touring brought the band a generation of loyal fans."

Face to Face provided the band's first top 50 appearance on the Kent Music Report Singles Chart with "Take a Long Line", which peaked at No. 29. David Crofts of The Canberra Times caught their local gig in October 1978, where they were supported by Midnight Oil:

The Angels have a more limited repertoire than Midnight Oil. What the band does might not be as creative but it is good. Very good... The band's raw rhythm is magnetic... one number that is vaguely reminiscent of Lou Reed, 'Coming Down' was my pick of their best act.

In November they supported David Bowie on his first Australian tour, however Crofts felt that at their Canberra gig they "played disappointingly. They played for only 35 minutes, apparently without feeling what-so-ever... they weren't a patch on their performance at the ANU a month ago." According to Neeson, "Bowie was fantastic. He treated us as his guests. He came down to our very first sound check and he offered us everything on stage in terms of lighting except for one special one that he wanted to keep." To coincide with the support slot, the Angels issued their first extended play, After the Rain – The Tour, with three tracks.

In June 1979, No Exit, their third studio album was released, which peaked at No. 8. It was co-produced by the band and Opitz, again. George Young (of Vanda & Young) contributed as a backing vocalist on the track, "Out of the Blue". The Canberra Times' Greg Falk reviewed their live performance in June, where they were supported by Flowers, "The Angels play to a set formula in their music. It's fast rock with no empty spaces. Rhythm guitarist John Brewster gives backing vocals to Doc Neeson while brother Rick Brewster fills in any gaps that have been left. The band's new material sounds very similar to their brilliant [second] album... [They] have worked themselves into a tight unit giving out as much energy as the audience on Tuesday gave back to them." No Exit provided the single, "Shadow Boxer", which peaked at No. 25.

On 29 September of that year, Alberts released the Out of the Blue four-track EP, which provided the third studio version of "Am I Ever Gonna See Your Face Again" in three years. The EP reached No. 29 on the Kent Music Report Singles Chart. On New Year's Eve 1979, the band performed in front of almost 60,000 people on the steps of the Sydney Opera House. Their set, however, was cut short when a riot broke out in the audience. Neeson was cut by a broken bottle thrown by an audience member, and Bailey was knocked unconscious by another bottle: both were taken to hospital to receive stitches.

=== 1980s: Face to Face overseas version to Beyond Salvation ===
The Angels signed an international contract with CBS Records and, in March 1980, released a new version of Face to Face on the Epic Records subsidiary. It is a compilation of tracks from the Australian forms of Face to Face and No Exit, plus an edited variety of the 1979 studio version of "Am I Ever Gonna See Your Face Again" from Out of the Blue. The Australian band billed itself as Angel City to avoid legal problems with the Casablanca Records' glam rockers, Angel. They stated that they hated the international name, Angel City. Nevertheless, they spent over half of that year touring the United States and Canada in support of the album. AllMusic's John Floyd described them, "This roaring Australian combo displays their AC/DC-cum-punk hearts on a powerful US debut."

The group undertook an international tour with six weeks in the US and a month in Europe. Karen Hughes of the Canberra Times described the group's performance in New York, where the "relentless, hard edged, machine gun-like attack won from an extremely difficult audience dotted with rock luminaries Mick Ronson, Ian Hunter and Karla Devito, if nothing else, respect." Their Los Angeles show was "a subtler version of the 'Angel City' phenomenon, so familiar to Australian rock audiences. That night the five-piece band elevated the capacity crowd, members of new wave bands UFO and Pretenders included, to a truly feverish climax that begged three encores."

"We're basically a live band playing rock 'n' roll for people who want to come down and dance."

— −Doc Neeson

In June 1980, Dark Room, their fourth studio album was released, which was produced by the Brewster brothers. The album peaked at No. 5 in Australia and No. 37 on the New Zealand Albums Chart. Its overseas version had re-recorded versions of "Ivory Stairs" and "Straight Jacket" in place of "Alexander" and "I'm Scared". The American band, Great White, later covered "Face the Day" (from this LP), as well as "Can't Shake It" from No Exit. Dark Room provided the single, "No Secrets", in May, which peaked at No. 8 on the Australian charts. It was co-written by Bidstrup and Neeson.

Two further singles, "Poor Baby" and "Face the Day" followed, both reached the top 100. Their performance of "No Secrets" on Countdown in August was described by The Australian Women's Weekly's Greg Flynn, "A towering and courteous gentleman named Doc Neeson, nattily dressed in white dinner jacket and sneakers, was given the nod by a floor manager and loped onto a black-and-white chequered set. Music erupted from amplifiers dotted around the studio and Doc launched himself into a song about an actress who 'lives in a tower armed with defences she learnt from her mother and friends'. Doc, for those of you still faithfully dusting your Glenn Miller records, is lead singer for The Angels – Australia's top drawing live band."

During October 1980, they supported the Kinks on a US tour, which was a "dynamic double bill of rock music" according to Susan Moore of The Australian Women's Weekly. John Brewster had described their earlier Australian tour to Moore, "We've really enjoyed the last year. The national tour for our album Dark Room was a very interesting tour, with lots of high spots."

In March 1981, Bidstrup left the band, reportedly due to non-musical differences, and was replaced by New Zealander, Brent Eccles (ex-Space Waltz, Citizen Band), on drums and percussion. Bidstrup was a touring member of the Swingers in that year, he joined the Party Boys in 1983 and formed GANGgajang in the following year. In May 1981 they issued a non-album single, "Into the Heat", which peaked at No. 14. It was followed on 24 October by a four-track live EP, Never So Live, recorded by the new line-up, which reached No. 17. On the strength of a new track, "Fashion and Fame", it shipped 80,000 copies.

In November 1981, the group's fifth studio album, Night Attack, which was produced by Ed Thacker and the Brewsters, was released. McFarlane felt it "saw the songs moving into heavy metal territory", which peaked at No. 11 in Australia and No. 14 in New Zealand. As their third international album, Night Attack, included a remixed version of "Back on You", previously available on the flip-side of the "Into the Heat" single. Early in 1982 Bailey left the group due to "visa issues that prevented his joining the band in the US." Los Angeles-based session musician, Jim Hilbun (Holly Penfield, see Ian Ritchie), was recruited as his replacement on bass guitar, vocals, saxophone and organ. Bailey joined Adelaide-based rock group, Gotham City, in late 1982 alongside Bidstrup; two years later the pair were founders of GANGgajang in Sydney.

In January 1983, the Angels headlined the inaugural Narara Music Festival. Neeson arranged for the performance to be filmed, as he intended it to be his last with the band, he had initially planned to leave the group and pursue an acting career. Live at Narara, with 11 tracks, was released on VHS in 1988 via Mushroom Video. The film crew were Greg Hunter, Andy Capp and Garry Maunder on cameras; Matt Butler as editor; directed by Bernie Cannon; Neeson as executive producer and produced in association with radio station, Triple M. McFarlane felt it "featured the band delivering an absolutely blistering performance." After the festival Neeson continued with the group.

In May 1983, they released their sixth studio album, Watch the Red, which was produced by the Angels, and engineered by Andrew Scott and Al Wright. It peaked at No. 6 on the Australian chart and reached the top 50 in New Zealand. It fulfilled their obligations to CBS and Epic Records and they signed with Mushroom Records with overseas distribution by Music Corporation of America (MCA). Shane Pinnegar of 100% Rock Magazine revisited the album in May 2014 and felt it "wasn't so much a left turn for The Angels as a widening of their sound palette... [Hilbun was] to surprise the band as much as the fans when he proved to be a very capable sax player... a fascinating album, a collision of intellectual observational lyricism, a manic confrontational mix of personalities in the band, and a need to evolve slightly beyond the straight pub rock they had made a name for themselves playing for the previous ten years."

The lead single, "Stand Up", written by Hilbun, reached No. 21 in Australia. The album, critically acclaimed for its musical inventiveness, featured saxophone leads from Hilbun, John Brewster on lead vocals for a track ("No Sleep in Hell"), and even a piano accordion. Material was derived from a 40-minute jam-session, later released in Australia as "The Blow", including an instrumental track and some improvised lyrics from Neeson. Recording sessions were interrupted by a fire, which gutted the studio, almost destroying the master tapes. Its second single, "Eat City", peaked at No. 22. During 1983 they toured the US again, they were the support act for the Kinks. In April 2010 Neeson appeared on ABC-TV's pop music quiz, Spicks and Specks, series 6, episode 12, where he claimed that Ray Davies (lead singer of the Kinks) was "scared about the applause we got as a support act." During the tour Davies directed that the Angels' stage lights be halved and finally he took them off the tour prior to the last show at Madison Square Gardens.

The Angels' seventh studio album, Two Minute Warning, was released in January 1985, following a three-month recording stint in Los Angeles with Ashley Howe producing. It peaked at No. 5 in Australia and the top 40 in New Zealand. The album's fourth Australian single, "Underground", was released in mid-1985 and reached the top 60 in Australia, In the US it had been released earlier and peaked at No. 35, in February, on Billboard's Mainstream Rock Songs. The US album, on MCA, included a re-recording of their 1978 song, "Be with You", which became the group's last commercially available single in that market. Metal Blade Records re-issued the album in 1990.

Unfortunately for the band, a personnel purge at MCA meant that Two Minute Warning received little support from the label. MCA rejected the group's next album. As Angel City, they performed four songs for the July 1985 Oz for Africa concert, part of the global Live Aid program: "Small Price", "Eat City", "Underground", and "Take a Long Line". They were broadcast in Australia, (on both the Seven Network and Nine Network), and on MTV in the US.

John Brewster left the band in February 1986, his last concerts were on 27 January – a double in Melbourne at the Sidney Myer Music Bowl and then the Palace Theatre. In his place they hired ex-Skyhooks guitarist Bob Spencer in March. John Brewster joined a new version of the Party Boys in that year and remained until 1989. In October 1986, Howling, their eighth studio album, which was recorded at Sydney's Rhinoceros Studios with Steve Brown producing (US, Cult, Wham), was released on Mushroom Records. It reached No. 6 in Australia and No. 10 in New Zealand.

Eccles explained to Pollyanna Sutton of The Canberra Times how the group's sound had developed: "The change started when John Brewster left. He virtually ran the band and there were a lot of things we would have liked to have done with Two Minute Warning. Howling is the follow-up. We experimented with stuff then and different instruments and with this album we sealed it with new instruments and backing singers right up there. It really represents what the band is capable of." It provided a cover version of the Animals' hit, "We Gotta Get out of This Place" in January 1987 which, at No. 7, became the band's highest-charting single in Australia. It peaked at No. 13 in New Zealand.

In December 1987, a double live album, Live Line, was released, which peaked at No. 3 in Australia and No. 13 in New Zealand. The collection spanned ten years of their career. Most of its tracks were recorded at the Bankstown RSL Club, Sydney, with some taken from earlier tours with John Brewster. The CD version included four songs not included on the vinyl release. A live version of "Am I Ever Gonna See Your Face Again" was issued in January 1988 as a single, which reached No. 11 in Australia and included the first recording of the audience response chant, "No Way, Get Fucked, Fuck Off". Another single was a medley of "Love Takes Care" and "Be with You" in May.

In May 1988, Spencer broke his wrist as the result of an "unfortunate collision" on stage with Neeson. He was substituted on a national tour by Jimi "The Human" Hocking on guitar and backing vocals. Hocking later recalled "I was called up as the result of some session work I had recently done. It was originally to fill in for one night and the tour would be cancelled. The gig went so well, that the band offered me the guitar spot for the rest of the tour, so overnight I found myself on a major rock tour at 24 years of age." For each gig they provided a lengthy three-hour set which covered their musical history. After the tour Spencer resumed his duties on guitar and Hocking formed a new band, Jimi the Human and Spectre 7.

Chrysalis Records in the US and Japan issued the group's ninth studio album, Beyond Salvation, using the band name, the Angels from Angel City, in November 1989. It was recorded in Memphis with Terry Manning (ZZ Top, Led Zeppelin) producing. While working on the album the group and Manning "on guitar, played fun gigs billed as Dancing Dick and the Richards and The Cow Demons." During recording sessions Hilbun was replaced by James Morley (ex-Strawberry Blonde) on bass guitar and backing vocals. Hilbun became a member of Richard Clapton's backing band in 1989 and then Angry Anderson's band in the following year.

The international version had new re-recordings of previously released tracks, "I Ain't the One", "Can't Shake It", "Who Rings the Bell", "City out of Control" and "Am I Ever Gonna See Your Face Again", none of which were available in Australia. Alan Niven was signed on as their US manager; he also handled Great White and Guns N' Roses. However, Niven soon left the Angels management.

=== 1990s: Beyond Salvation to Doc Neeson's departure ===
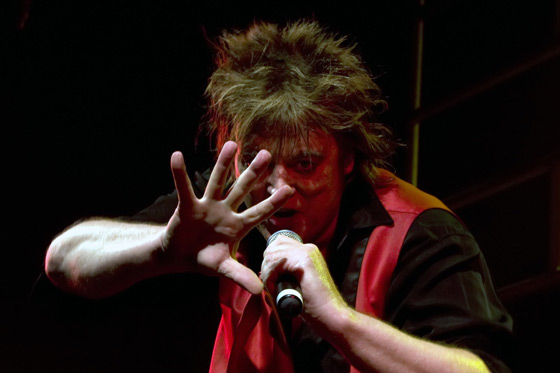
Neeson, The Forum, November 2008 Courtesy Mandy Hall

The international version of Beyond Salvation had only included four new tracks, three of these appeared on the Australian form of the album, which was released in February 1990 via Mushroom Records. It also had eight new tracks, all produced by Manning, not available on the international format. In June of that year Beyond Salvation became the Angels' first and only No. 1 album in Australia, where it remained in the top 100 for 38 weeks and was certified platinum for shipment of 70,000 units. In New Zealand, in September, it reached No. 3 – their highest-charting album there.

McFarlane opined that "It was one of The Angels' best albums, Manning having stripped the band's sound back to basics and brought the guitars to the fore." The Canberra Times summarised an article from US-based, Musician, as "a glowing review... [which] recounted the long history of bum deals and legal problems which have kept The Angels off the American market" with the album showing a "wonderfully off-hand confidence." Nimmervoll observed that "Internationally it was the last throw of the dice. For whatever reason, despite their reputation, the Angels had never established a sustainable international following."

In Australia it provided five singles, starting with "Let the Night Roll On" which peaked at No. 17 in Australia. The Canberra Times reviewer described it as "hard rock, basic as a scream and powerful as a punch. A taste of things to come... Get your head ready for a bit of banging." "Dogs are Talking", reached No. 11 in Australia and was certified gold for shipment of 35,000 copies. It was co-written by Rick, Eccles, Hilbun, Neeson and Spencer and charted in New Zealand at No. 12.

Their Beyond Salvation Tour had Cheap Trick as a support act. The flip-side of the Australian version of "Dogs are Talking" featured demo tracks by three new Australian acts, which supported the Angels on that tour: the Desert Cats, the Hurricanes and the John Woodruff-managed group, Baby Animals. In New Zealand the B-side of "Dogs Are Talking" featured songs from two local support acts; both were the first releases: Nine Livez' "Live It Up" and Shihad's "Down Dance".

"Back Street Pickup" peaked in the top 30 in both Australia and New Zealand. Its music video was filmed the day the band were told of the album reaching number one on the charts and shows a buoyant and enthusiastic band performing.

Red Back Fever, their tenth studio album, had partly been recorded in Memphis with Terry Manning producing the basic tracks during the Beyond Salvation sessions, and was released in November 1991. It was co-produced by the group with Steve James, which reached No. 14 in Australia and the top 50 in New Zealand. The band toured for two years, and the album's third single, "Tear Me Apart" (July 1992), was included in a multimillion-dollar government campaign highlighting alcohol-related violence. It reached the top 40. Also in that month Mushroom re-issued the album as a two-CD set: Red Back Fever / Left Hand Drive; the latter contained unreleased and rare tracks. Then they undertook the Alcohol and Violence Tears You Apart tour.

In 1992, Spencer left and Morley followed soon after, they were subsequently replaced by returning members John Brewster and Hilbun. Spencer joined Black Cat Moan and then was a member of the Choirboys from 1992 to 2004. Morley joined a string of cover bands. In 1993 the Angels performed a one-off gig at the University of Western Sydney, co-headlining with the Screaming Jets. Other artists on the bill were Mental as Anything, Peter Wells (formerly of Rose Tattoo) and Wickud Skunk, a band from Tasmania.

In 1994, the New Zealand chapter of Hells Angels asked the band to perform. They issued a compilation album, Evidence in December of that year, which included two new tracks: "Don't Need Mercy" and "Turn It On". The Hard Evidence Tour E.P. followed in April of the next year which included those two tracks from Evidence and two more new ones, "Spinning My Wheels" and "Blue Light".

In April 1995, they head-lined the Barbed Wire Ball tour, a national tour that also featured the Screaming Jets, The Poor and Who's Guilty. The band took a hiatus from recording and touring, to reconvene in mid-1996 at Darling Harbour studios for the start of sessions for their eleventh studio album, Skin & Bone (1998).

In July 1997, the Angels hit the road with the Lounge Lizard Tour, with guest vocalists Angry Anderson (from Rose Tattoo) and Ross Wilson (from Daddy Cool, Mondo Rock). The band provided acoustic backing for each singer's performance, which included works from their respective bands. On 13 August of that year the Angels signed a recording deal with Shock Records in Australia.

A new single, "Caught in the Night", written by Jim Hilbun with Doc changing the chorus lyrics and Rick contributing a chord change, was released in October 1997. It was followed by Skin & Bone, which peaked at No. 29 on the ARIA Albums Chart. On 20 October 1998 the Angels, line-up of Chris Bailey, Jim Hilbun. John and Rick Brewster, Brent Eccles and Doc Neeson, were inducted into the ARIA Hall of Fame by Angry Anderson. In November 1998 the band performed a brief set at the Concert of the Century in Melbourne to celebrate Mushroom Records' 25th anniversary. On New Year's Eve 1999 they performed their last concert at the MGM Grand Darwin Millennium Concert. Shortly afterwards, Doc Neeson announced his hiatus from the band following a major car accident that had left him with neck and spinal injuries.

=== 2000s: Spinoff bands to reunion ===
With Neeson's departure, the Angels effectively ceased, although Rick and John Brewster considered recruiting another singer. In November 2000 Shock Records reissued Left Hand Drive. The Australian Broadcasting Corporation featured the group in its music series, Long Way to the Top, in "Episode 4: Berserk Warriors", broadcast on 5 September 2001. It, and two subsequent episodes, was issued as a video recording, Long Way to the Top: Stories of Australian and New Zealand Rock and Roll: Episodes 4-6: Disc 2, in that year. In the episode Neeson described pub venues, "The stench would just hit you and the atmosphere was overwhelming, like a real energy built out of the claustrophobia... We looked forward to playing at the Lifesaver 'cause it was the sort of thing where you could go in and try anything. Once, during the solo, I started throwing fish at the audience."

During the 2000s, competing versions of the group under different names were formed either by the Brewster brothers or by Neeson. In March 2001 a new version, Members of the Angels, with the line-up of Bailey, Bidstrup, John and Rick Brewster and Hilbun on lead vocals. They provided a one-off performance at one of the Ted Mulry Benefit Concerts, which were released on video as Gimme Ted (2003). On 24 June 2002 Shock Records issued The Complete Sessions 1980–1983, a 4-CD box set of the band's recorded output from Dark Room to the Watch the Red albums. Around that time, Bailey, Bidstrup and the Brewsters toured as the Original Angels Band. Neeson later recalled, "When I had my car accident I was told I was going to end up in a wheelchair for the rest of my life. We made an agreement about the use of the name The Angels because they wanted to continue."

In the meantime, Neeson, Hilbun and Westfield chief executive David Lowy formed Red Phoenix, releasing an album produced by Terry Manning and touring briefly during 2005. In July 2006 Liberation reissued much of the Angels' catalogue including Dark Room, Night Attack, Watch the Red, Two Minute Warning, Howling, Beyond Salvation, Red Back Fever and Wasted Sleepless Night – The Definitive Greatest Hits.

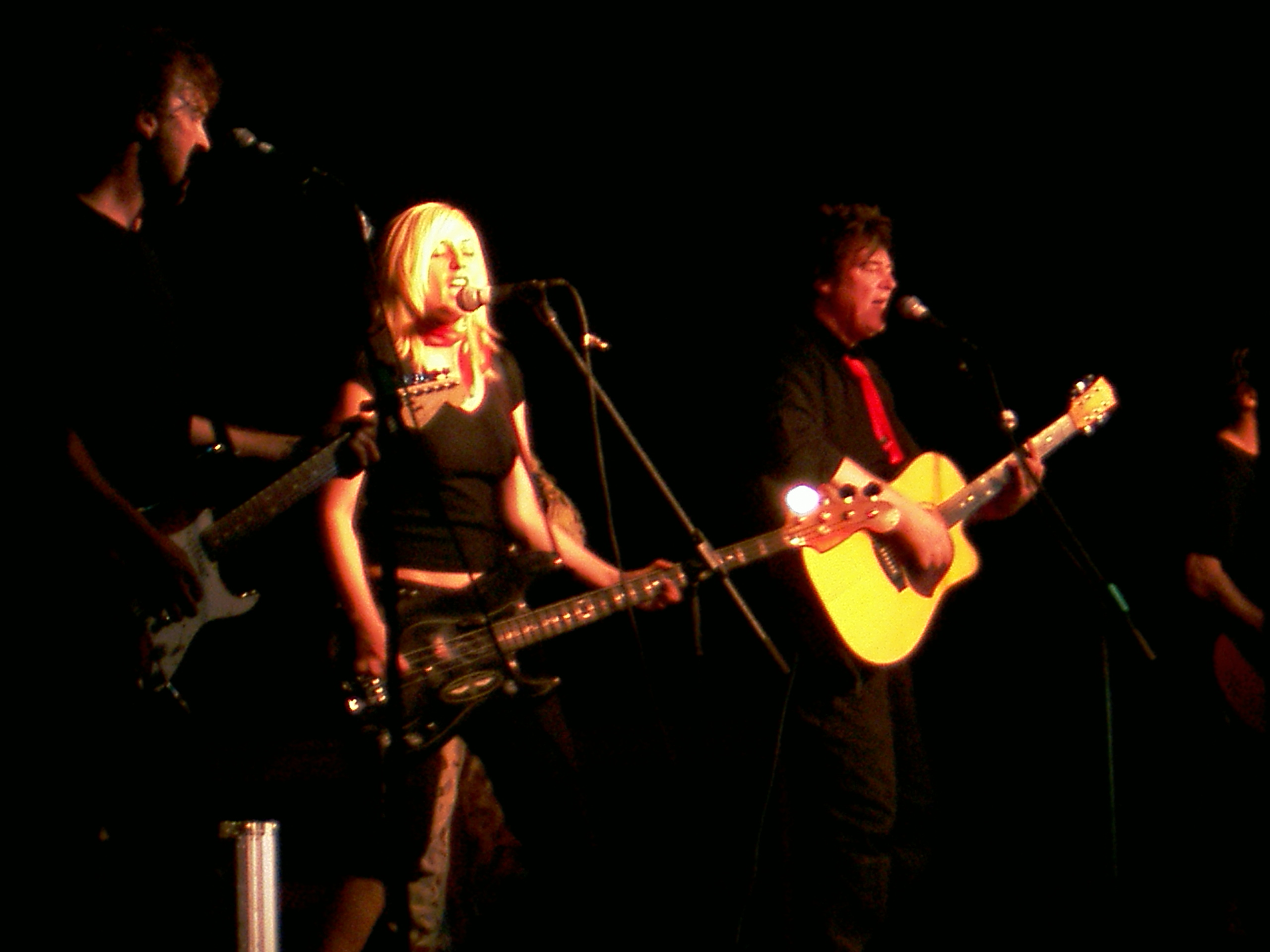
Doc Neeson's Angels, Baghdad, October 2007. With Neeson are Sarah Graye on bass guitar, Mitch Hutchinson on guitar, Dave Leslie on guitar and Mick Skelton on drums. They played on the Tour de Force for Australian service personnel in Afghanistan, Iraq and Kuwait.

On 4 December 2006 Live at the Basement was released, which was recorded by the Bailey, Bidstrup and Brewsters: once again using the name, the Angels. In September 2007 Neeson won a legal injunction to stop them from using that name. As a part of the Countdown Spectacular 2, he toured Australian capitals as Doc Neeson's Angels from 18 August to 5 September 2007. He used the line-up of Hilbun, Lowy, Dave Leslie (ex-Baby Animals) on guitar and Paul Wheeler (ex-Icehouse), who was later replaced by Mick Skelton, on drums. The Neeson version released an album, Acoustic Sessions (1 September 2007), using Hilbun, Leslie and Tim Powles on percussion, via Liberation Blue. The Brewster-led band meanwhile released an EP, Ivory Stairs.

In October 2007, Neeson's band joined the Tour de Force, which performed in the Middle East for 13 shows in 16 days for Australian service personnel in Afghanistan, Iraq and Kuwait. His line-up for the tour was Leslie, Skelton, Sarah Graye (ex-Nitocris) on bass guitar and Mitch Hutchinson on guitar. While in the field Neeson was presented with two medals, National Service Medal and the Australian Defence Medal, by Major General Mark Evans in Baghdad. Wasted Sleepless Nights: The Definitive Greatest Hits was released as a DVD on 11 July 2007. It included live footage never before released, and tracks recorded live from ABC's Studio 22.

Paul Cashmere of Undercover.com.au announced the reunion of Neeson with Bailey, Bidstrup and the Brewster brothers, as the Angels in April 2008. The re-formed band played a string of dates from June to August 2008, which included celebration of the 30th anniversary of their album, Face to Face. The "uneasy reconciliation" between the members was shown in a documentary, No Way, Get F*#ked, F*#k Off! (11 October 2008) screened on SBS-TV. It was directed by Ben Ulm, produced by Stu McCarney, edited by Francine Thomson, audio mixed by Mark Tanner and original score by Rick Brewster. It was released on DVD, under the same name, via Beyond Home Entertainment, later that year.

On 17th April 2010, The Angels joined with The Adelaide Art Orchestra conducted by Rob John to perform "A Symphony of Angels" at the Adelaide Festival Theatre.

=== 2010s: Neeson solo to Gleeson on lead vocals ===
Their 40-year journey is akin to a Shakespearean epic, with countless line-up changes, members taking legal action against each other, brothers falling out, incredible highs and stupid dumb lows ... But for two or three years around 1978–81 The Angels were one of the most brilliant bands of the country.

— John O'Donnell, Toby Creswell and Craig Mathieson in 100 Best Australian Albums (October 2010).

In late 2010, Neeson announced that he would resume his solo career. He went on to form the Angels 100% with Bidstrup, Hilbun, Morley, and Spencer. They performed a sole private show to 1,000 people at a mining installation in Western Australia in late 2012.

In May 2011, Bailey and the Brewsters recruited drummer Nick Norton, and Screaming Jets singer (and MMM FM radio DJ), Dave Gleeson to front the Angels. Bidstrup and Neeson claim "the remaining three members of the band have contravened an agreement by bringing in two new members to tour Australian pubs as The Angels." Nevertheless, this line-up recorded new tracks for the first time since the late 1990s. In June 2011 they released an EP, Waiting for the Sun, and toured Australia in support through to 2012. In January 2012 they recorded a live album, the Angels first in two decades, at the QPAC theatre in Brisbane.

On 31 August 2012, the Angels, with Gleeson aboard, released their first new studio album in 14 years, Take It to the Streets, which peaked at No. 24 on the ARIA albums chart. On the same day they also released "Live at QPAC", the band's first live album since 1988's "Liveline". It was briefly available as a 2× CD album.

In November and December 2012, the Angels with Dave Gleeson joined the Baby Animals and the Hoodoo Gurus for the national A Day on the Green tour, resulting in a headlining show in front of 8,500 in Perth. Also in November the Angels with Gleeson began recording songs for a new studio album, and announced their Take It to the Streets national tour, from 22 February to 20 April 2013. However, in January 2013, Bailey was diagnosed with throat cancer, and John Brewster's son, Sam Brewster, would step in for him playing bass on tour. Sam would become the official bass player for the band after Bailey's death from the cancer on 4 April 2013 at age 62. In February 2014 they released a second album with Gleeson, Talk the Talk, which reached the top 50.

From November 2019, The Angels co-headlined the "They Who Rock 2019" tour with Baby Animals. The promote the tour, The Angels released a cover of The Baby Animals' "One Word" and the Baby Animals covered The Angels' "Marseilles", both released on 1 October 2019.

=== 2020s: New material and Gleeson's departure ===
In June 2020, the Angels released the EP Under the Stone, the first new material in 6 years. In 2020, The Angels were listed at number 45 in Rolling Stone Australia's "50 Greatest Australian Artists of All Time" issue.

In December 2021, the band performed with the Adelaide Symphony Orchestra in a special concert named "Symphony of Angels". The following year, the Brewster brothers joined Dune Rats in the ABC studios to record a cover of "Am I Ever Gonna See Your Face Again" for triple j's Like a Version segment.

In May 2023, Gleeson announced that he would be stepping down as the band's lead vocalist, with drummer Nick Norton taking his place. The line-up change also introduced new member Tom Brewster on drums, who is John Brewster's son and Sam Brewster's brother.

In May 2024, the group announced the forthcoming released of Ninety Nine, their first studio album in ten years.

== Illnesses and deaths ==
In January 2013, it was announced that Chris Bailey had been diagnosed with a throat cancer, and his place on bass guitar with the Angels was filled by John Brewster's son, Sam. Bailey died on 4 April 2013, aged 62. A tribute concert for him was held at Thebarton Theatre on 17 April. Gary Bradshaw of Amnplify described how "the planned benefit gig turned into a night to celebrate Chris' life and his contribution to Australian music over many years." The Angels and other fellow Australians performed.

On 10 January 2013, Neeson revealed that he had been diagnosed with a brain tumour and would undergo immediate treatment. At a benefit concert, Rock for Doc, in April Neeson told the audience, "The news is grim. But some people can actually get right through and that's the way I'm trying to think about things. So I'm looking forward optimistically to the future... And I've been sick with a brain tumour, and my doctors told me not to come out tonight. But the show goes on!" He performed two songs; other artists at the Enmore Theatre were members of Midnight Oil, Rose Tattoo, Noiseworks, Cold Chisel, Dragon and Mi-Sex. On 4 June 2014, Bernard "Doc" Neeson died of his brain tumour, aged 67.

== Personnel ==
Current members

- Rick Brewster – lead guitar, backing vocals, keyboards (1974–2000, 2008–present)
- John Brewster – rhythm guitar, backing vocals, harmonica, bass (1974–1986, 1992–2000, 2008–present), lead vocals (1974–1976) lead guitar (2023–present)
- Nick Norton – lead vocals, rhythm guitar (2023–present), drums, backing vocals (2011–2023)
- Sam Brewster – bass, occasional lead guitar (2013–present), backing vocals (2023–present)
- Tom Brewster – drums (2023–present)

Former members

- Doc Neeson – lead vocals (1974–2000, 2008–2011; died 2014), bass, backing vocals (1974–1976)
- Charlie King – drums (1974–1976)
- Graham Bidstrup – drums, backing vocals (1976–1981, 2008–2011)
- Chris Bailey – bass, backing vocals (1976–1982, 2008–2013; died 2013)
- Brent Eccles – drums (1981–2000)
- Jim Hilbun – bass, saxophone, backing vocals, organ (1982–1989, 1992–2000)
- Bob Spencer – rhythm guitar, backing vocals (1985–1992)
- James Morley – bass, backing vocals (1989–1992)
- Dave Gleeson – lead vocals (2011–2023)

== Discography ==
- The Angels (1977)
- Face to Face (1978)
- No Exit (1979)
- Dark Room (1980)
- Night Attack (1981)
- Watch the Red (1983)
- Two Minute Warning (1984)
- Howling (1986)
- Beyond Salvation (1990)
- Red Back Fever (1991)
- Skin & Bone (1998)
- Take It to the Streets (2012)
- Talk the Talk (2014)
- Ninety Nine (2024)

== Recognition ==
A full-length documentary film, The Angels: Kickin' Down The Door, written and directed by Madeleine Parry, premiered at the Adelaide Film Festival in October 2022. Cinematography was by Liam Somerville (aka "CAPITAL WASTE"). The film was well-reviewed, and was released in Australian cinemas on 1 December 2022. The film was produced by Peter Hanlon with co-producers Martin Fabinyi (through Beyond Productions), Rick Davies, and Bettina Hamilton.

"Am I Ever Gonna See Your Face Again" was voted to 12th place in Triple J's Hottest 100 of Australian Songs on 26 July 2025. "No Secrets", too, was voted into the Hottest 200 a week later at number 185.

On 4 August 2025, a laneway in Adelaide city centre was named The Angels Lane, in honour of the band. The laneway is behind the Hindley Street Music Hall in Hindley Street and behind TAFE SA's Currie Street campus, between Rosina Street and Morphett Street. The walls on the side of the lane feature two murals by street artist Joel Van Moore (known as "Vans the Omega"), commissioned by the Adelaide City Council, as well as several light boxes that glow at night, showing some of the band's well-known moments. There are stencilled projections beamed from the TAFE campus, featuring digital art by cinematographer Liam Somerville (known as "Capital Waste"), who shot the 2022 documentary film about The Angels. There are also two a commemorative plaques.

Along with Lord Mayor of Adelaide Jane Lomax-Smith, band members from each of its lineups were honoured at the official opening; John and Rick Brewster, Graham Bidstrup, and Charlie King were there in person, with family members of both Doc Neeson and Chris Bailey representing the deceased members. Former vocalist Dave Gleeson of the Screaming Jets, Angels producer Mark Opitz and tour manager Mark Pope were also in attendance. The opening coincided with the city of Adelaide's 10th anniversary as a UNESCO City of Music.

In 2019, an unnamed private road off Gawler Place at the North Terrace end had been proposed for renaming, but the building owners had not agreed to the artwork and plaques.

== Awards ==
=== ARIA Music Awards ===
The ARIA Music Awards is an annual awards ceremony that recognises excellence, innovation, and achievement across all genres of Australian music. They commenced in 1987. The Angels were inducted into the Hall of Fame in 1998.

Year	Nominee / work	Award	Result
1998	The Angels	ARIA Hall of Fame	inductee
1998	Skin & Bone	Best Rock Album	Nominated

=== King of Pop Awards ===
The King of Pop Awards were voted by the readers of TV Week. The King of Pop award started in 1967 and ran through to 1978.

Year	Nominee / work	Award	Result
1978	Peter Ledger for Face to Face by The Angels	Best Cover Design	Won

=== South Australian Music Awards ===
The South Australian Music Awards are annual awards that exist to recognise, promote and celebrate excellence in the South Australian contemporary music industry. They commenced in 2012. The South Australian Music Hall of Fame celebrates the careers of successful music industry personalities.

Year	Nominee / work	Award	Result	Ref.
2014	John & Rick Brewster	Hall of Fame	inductee	
2015	Doc Neeson & Chris Bailey	Hall of Fame	inductee	
2016	Moonshine Jug and String Band and The Angels	Hall of Fame	inductee	

=== TV Week / Countdown Awards ===
Countdown was an Australian pop music TV series on national broadcaster ABC-TV from 1974 to 1987, it presented music awards from 1979 to 1987, initially in conjunction with magazine TV Week. The TV Week / Countdown Awards were a combination of popular-voted and peer-voted awards.

Year	Nominee / work	Award	Result
1979	Face to Face	Best Australian Album	Nominated
1979	themselves	Countdown Producers Award	Won
1981	themselves	Most Consistent Live Act	Nominated
