= Bob Spencer =

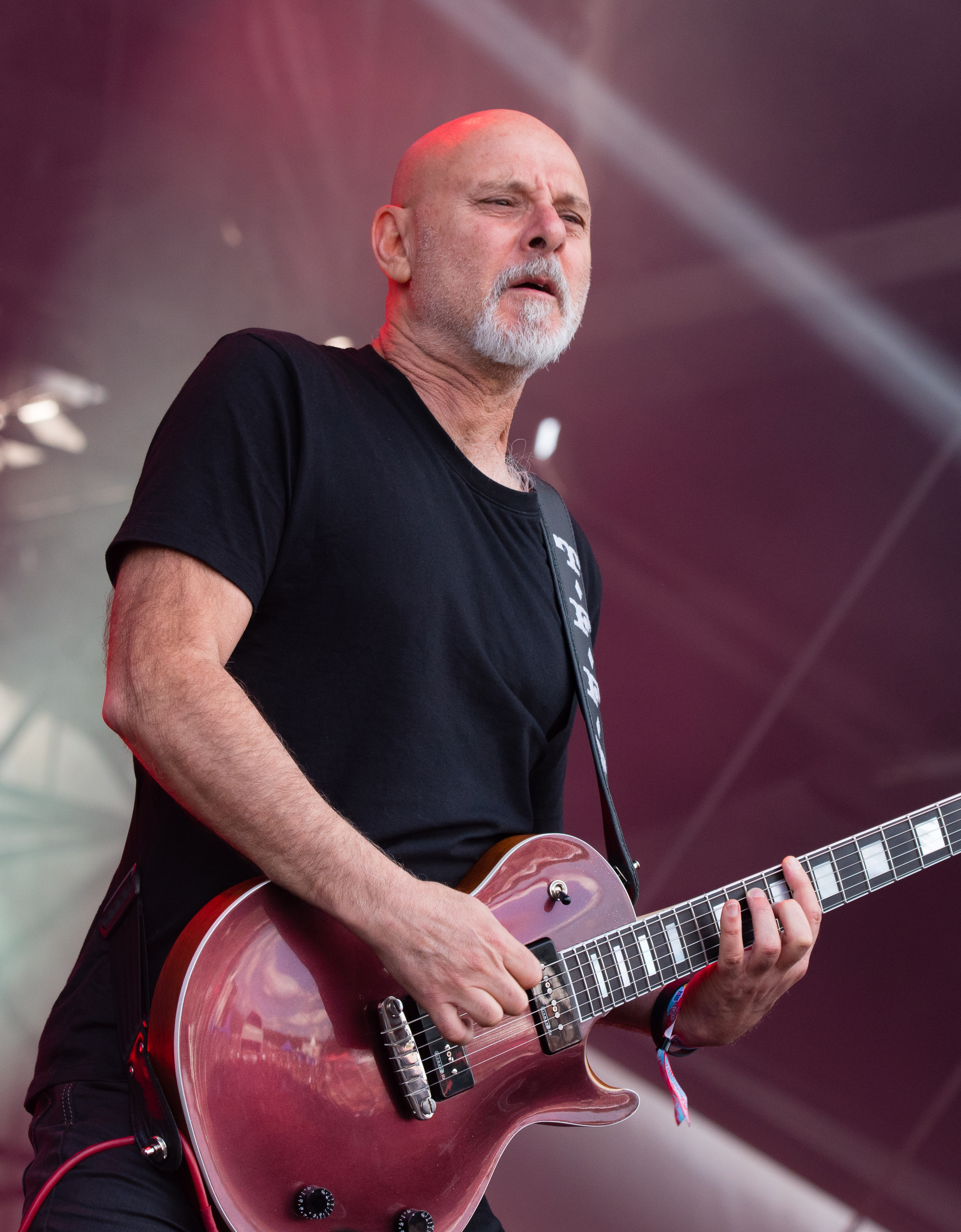
- Spencer performing in 2018

Background information
- Born: Robert F. Spencer; 5 September 1957 (age 69); Sydney, Australia
- Genres: Rock, hard rock,
- Occupation: Musician
- Instrument: Guitar
- Years active: 1973–present

Robert F. Spencer (born 5 September 1957) is an Australian rock guitarist. He was a latter day member of Skyhooks (1977–1980), the Angels (1986–1992) and Rose Tattoo (2017–2022). As a songwriter he co-wrote tracks for the Angels, including sole writer for their single "Finger on the Trigger" (1988), which reached the ARIA Singles Chart top 40.

== Early life ==
Robert F. Spencer, grew up in Sydney's Eastern suburb, Maroubra and attended Our Lady of Annunciation Primary School, at Pagewood, New South Wales from 1963 to 1965 and Marist Brothers, at Daceyville from 1966 to 1969. In 1970, he started secondary education at Marist Brothers Pagewood (later named Marist College, and then called Champagnat Catholic College Pagewood).

== Career ==
Spencer was a founding member of the rock band Finch in 1973 while attending Marist Brothers Pagewood, where he completed his Higher School Certificate in 1975.

He left Finch in 1977 to replace Red Symons on guitar in Skyhooks. He left that group in 1980. In 1986 he joined the Angels on guitar to replace John Brewster. He remained with the band until 1992. While a member of the Angels, he was also a co-songwriter of their material as well as sole writer for their single, "Finger on the Trigger" (1988). It peaked in the ARIA Singles Chart top 40.

Other bands in which he played were Mystery Band (1980–82), Fandango (1981), Honeymoon, Young Lions (both in 1984), Black Cat Moan (1982–90), the Puppy Bashers (1981) (the band were animal lovers and this poor taste joke rightly raised the ire of the RSPCA), the Temple Gods (1992–93) and, very briefly, the Choirboys (1996).

Spencer lived in Melbourne and was active in the band Raw Brit playing cover versions of English rock music by Cream, Free, Deep Purple and Slade, originally from the 1970s and 1980s. He was also a coach for professional bands and helped mature amateurs in the Weekend Warriors program. He continued to coach bands, and welcomed those who wanted professional, experienced guidance. In August 2013, Spencer revealed on his Facebook page that he had been diagnosed with cancer, but confirmed that it was not life-threatening – he continued with one healthy kidney.

Bob Spencer was a guitarist in hard rock band, Rose Tattoo, from 2017 to 2022 and left for personal and political reasons, after a final European tour. Spencer was teaching, coaching and writing music, mostly evocative and instrumental, which he considered to be dark blues and heavy funk. In June 2025 he was featured in a video with the Filthy Animals performing a Status Quo song. As of 2026 Spencer provided guitar in the reformed V.Spy V.Spy.
