= Doc Neeson =

Australian rock singer-songwriter and musician (1947–2014)

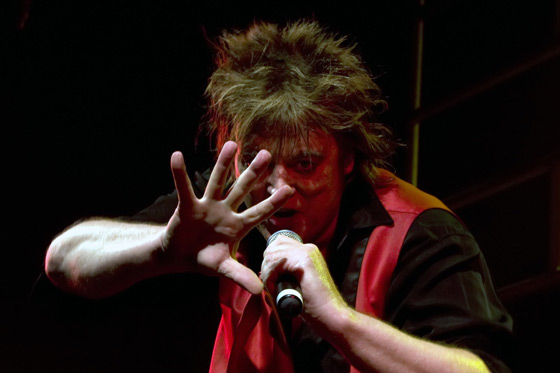
- Doc Neeson in November 2008

Background information
- Also known as: Doc
- Born: Bernard Patrick Neeson; 4 January 1947; Belfast, Northern Ireland
- Origin: Adelaide, South Australia
- Died: 4 June 2014 (aged 67) Sydney, New South Wales, Australia
- Genres: Hard rock, blues rock, rock and roll, pub rock
- Occupations: Singer-songwriter, musician
- Instruments: Vocals, bass guitar, guitar
- Years active: 1971–2014

Bernard Patrick "Doc" Neeson OAM (4 January 1947 – 4 June 2014) was an Australian singer-songwriter and musician. He was the front man for the hard rock band The Angels from its formation in February 1976 through to 1999. The band then split up and reformed in 2008 after a lengthy legal battle where Doc resumed his place as front man. For the group, Neeson was the main singer-songwriter and was the driving force behind the band being propelled into stardom for a period spanning over three decades. Their top 20 studio albums on the Australian Kent Music Report Albums Chart are Face to Face (June 1978), No Exit (June 1979), Dark Room (June 1980), Night Attack (November 1981), Watch the Red (May 1983), Two Minute Warning (November 1984) and Howling (October 1986). Their number-one album, Beyond Salvation, on the ARIA Albums Chart appeared in February 1990 and was followed by another top 20 album, Red Back Fever (November 1991). The group's top 20 singles on the related Australian charts are "No Secrets" (1980), "Into the Heat" (1981), "Never so Live" (1981), "We Gotta Get out of This Place" (1987), "Am I Ever Gonna See Your Face Again" (live, 1988), "Let the Night Roll On" (1990) and "Dogs Are Talking" (1990). On 20 October 1998, at the ARIA Awards the group were inducted into the Hall of Fame.

In early December 1999, three weeks prior to his performance at the Tour of Duty - Concert for the Troops in East Timor, Neeson had a car accident on the Sydney M4 Motorway, which led to years of pain and rehabilitation. Against all medical advice, he returned to the stage to carry on his legacy and resumed performing in 2006. He died of a brain tumour on 4 June 2014, aged 67, approximately 18 months from his initial diagnosis.

== Early life ==
Bernard Patrick Neeson was born on 4 January 1947 in Belfast, Northern Ireland. His father, Bernard James Neeson, was a British Army soldier, and his mother was Kathleen née Corrigan. Neeson was the eldest of six children. They were raised as Catholics although the family lived in a predominantly Protestant area of Belfast. He attended boarding school at Terenure College in Dublin. The family emigrated to Adelaide aboard the Strathnaver. They settled in the suburb of Elizabeth and he attended St Paul's College.

While at the college, Neeson had his first taste of performing. An extract from the 1963 College Annual states: ‘Three boys from Leaving this term entered in the Y.C.S. Talent Quest, singing ‘Michael’ and ‘He’s Got the Whole World’ – the ‘Reefers’ did not win (in fact, they didn’t even gain a place!) but they won wide fame for their attempt. (The boys, by the way, were B. Neeson, M. Clarke and B. Jaworskyj.)"

As a teenager he had promoted dances and in mid-1967 he advised an Adelaide group, Down the Line: "Y'know, you should change the name to something short and punchy like Zoot". After completing secondary education, Neeson entered an Adelaide teachers college, "my first career option was to become a teacher, certainly never thought of having a career as a musician". Before completing his course Neeson was conscripted for national service into the Australian army during the Vietnam War. He served as an education corps sergeant in New Guinea for eighteen months in the late 1960s. He subsequently attended Flinders University, completed degrees in film and drama, and intended to become a film director.

== Career ==
=== Doc Talbot to The Keystone Angels ===
While a student at Flinders University, Neeson as 'Doc Talbot' became a member of an acoustic blues group, Moonshine Jug and String Band, on vocals and guitar. That group had started in Adelaide in 1970 with brothers, Rick Brewster on guitar, washboard, jug, and backing vocals; and John Brewster on guitar, banjo, harmonica, and vocals. Neeson had previously been a member of The Innocents and when he joined the Brewsters they also had Craig Holden on guitar, Bob Petchell on banjo, and Pete Thorpe on bass guitar, washtub, and backing vocals.

Moonshine Jug and String Band recorded a four-track extended play, Keep You on the Move, in 1973, which had local success on the Adelaide charts, rising to No. 5. They followed with a single, "That's Alright with Me", in the next year. Their material appeared on the Sphere Organization label, owned by the group's manager, John Woodruff. Another four-track EP, Moonshine Jug and String Band, appeared in 1974.

By 1974 the group had discarded their acoustic blues sound and instrumentation to become The Keystone Angels playing electric instruments for 1950s style rock and roll, and R&B on the pub circuit. The line-up with Doc Neeson on guitar and vocals were: John Brewster on lead vocals and guitar; Rick on guitar; Peter Christopoulos (aka Charlie King) on drums; and Laurie Lever on keyboards. During that year they backed United States rock and roller, Chuck Berry, on his Australian tour. In late January 1975 the group performed at the final Sunbury Pop Festival, where they received a standing ovation. During that year they issued a lone single, "Keep on Dancing", on Sphere, which had Neeson on guitar while John provided lead vocals.

=== The Angels ===
The Keystone Angels supported AC/DC on a regional tour of South Australia and were signed to the group's label, Albert Productions. In February 1976 The Keystone Angels relocated to Sydney, they had "toughened [their] sound into a unique brand of beefy hard rock". Upon the advice of in-house producers, Vanda & Young, they shortened their name to The Angels. The line-up, with Neeson as lead singer, bass guitarist and front man, was the Brewster brothers and King. Their debut single, "Am I Ever Gonna See Your Face Again", was issued in March 1976 on EMI/Albert. The track was composed by Neeson with the Brewsters, Neeson later described writing the lyrics, which had started as a "ballad about connecting with loss" after a university mate's girlfriend had been killed in a motorbike accident. In 1978 an audience in Mount Isa responded to the question posed in the song's title with "no way, get fucked, fuck off". Neeson described how this response was copied at other venues and became an important part of their performances: "...when the band first started, we were trying to write songs for Australian audiences; they’ve made it their own in a way I’d never have thought possible".

In August King was replaced by Graham Bidstrup on drums (ex-Fahrenheit 451, Red Angel Panic, Taxi, Pegasus). The group's choice for lead vocals was either Neeson's "gruff shout" or John Brewster's "clear tones". Neeson recalled "Our drummer, Buzz Bidstrup, said, 'Let's go with Doc. He's got the worst voice in the band' ... While I was looking daggers at him, he changed that to 'distinctive' and the penny dropped with everyone. We'd sacrifice sweetness for distinctiveness. That's how I became the Angels' lead singer".

In January 1977 Chris Bailey joined on bass guitar (ex-Red Angel Panic, Headband) freeing Neeson to concentrate on lead vocals and develop his stagecraft. The group's debut album, The Angels, appeared in August 1977 with seven of its ten tracks co-written by Neeson. The group's first top 50 hit on the Kent Music Report Singles Chart, "Take a Long Line", was issued in July 1978. It appeared ahead of their second album, Face to Face, in August, which peaked at No. 16 on the related Kent Music Report Albums Chart. Neeson and fellow band members co-produced the album with Mark Opitz.

Marie Ryan of Woroni in August 1978 felt the lead single "tells the story of a fringe-dweller who finds himself over whelmed and powerless in the face of The Authorities" while questioning "How much notice audiences actually take of the lyrics is debatable though they're not all that easy to ignore with Doc Neeson's twisting, contorted figure acting them out . . . shining a torch on the pogoing hordes while screaming" about Big Brother (from the book, Nineteen Eighty-Four). In October 2010 Face to Face was listed in the book, 100 Best Australian Albums, where the authors John O'Donnell, Toby Creswell and Craig Mathieson noted "the songs are driven at manic speed while Doc Neeson's lyrics of outsiders and alienation are sung with a gravelly intensity".

On New Year's Eve 1979 The Angels performed at the Sydney Opera House. The performance finished in "a riot and rock music was banned from official Sydney New Year's Eve celebrations". Neeson and Bailey received head injuries from bottles flung at them and "had to receive stitches to deep cuts".

The Angels continued through various line-ups which included differently named ensembles Angel City (for international releases) and The Angels from Angel City. On 20 October 1998 at the ARIA Awards the group were inducted into the Hall of Fame. Outside of his work with that group, Neeson initiated The Tour of Duty - Concert for the Troops held for the InterFET forces in East Timor which took place on 21 December 1999. He performed a number of The Angels tracks and duets with John Farnham, Kylie Minogue and The Living End. On New Year's Eve 1999 Neeson announced his departure from The Angels at the MGM Grand Darwin Millennium Concert citing his injury from a car accident earlier that month.

=== Alternative Angels ===
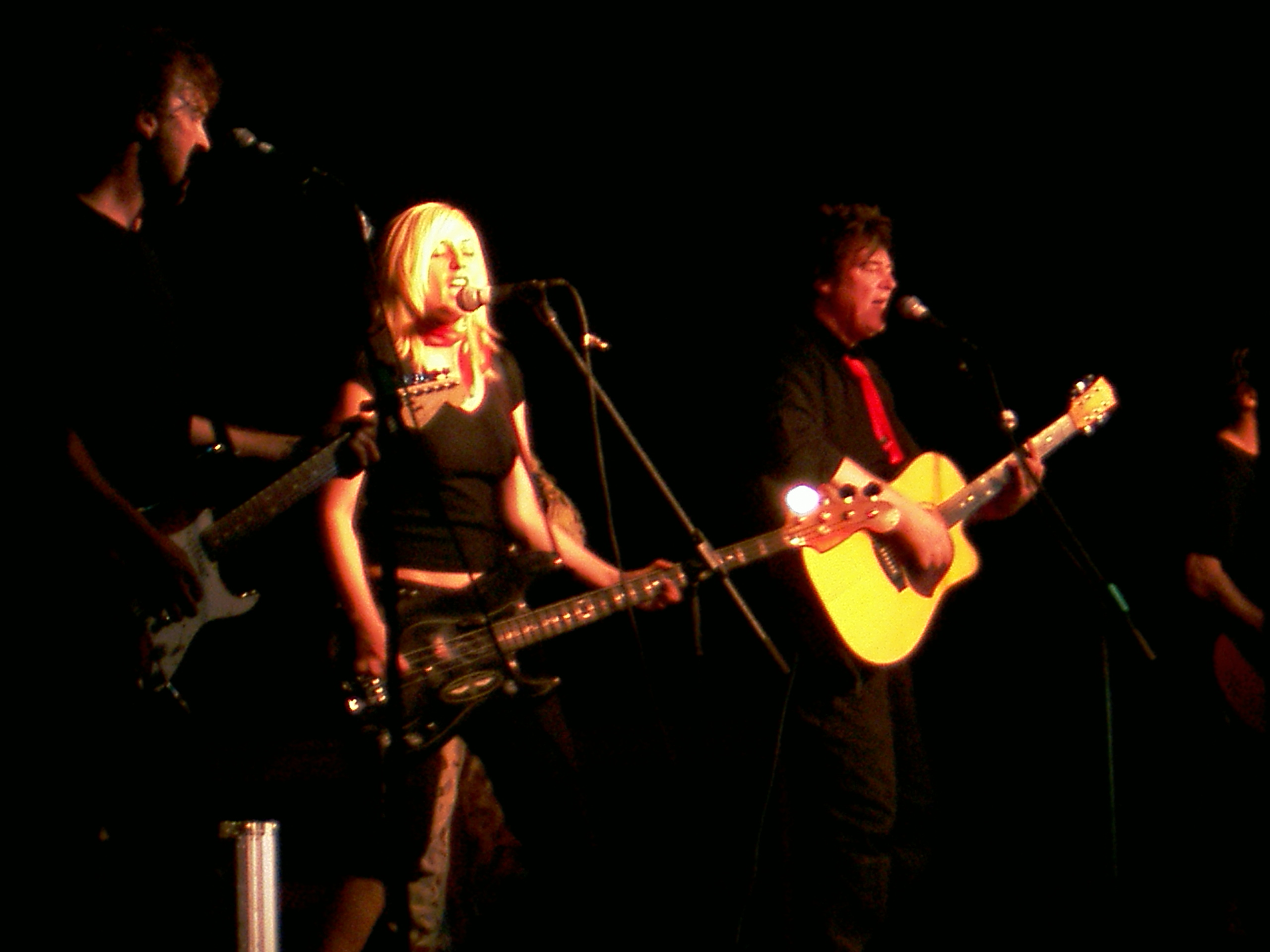
Doc Neeson's Angels 27 October 2007

In February 2001, Neeson performed at the Tour of Duty Encore! concert at the Australian War Memorial in Canberra. In August that year the Australian Broadcasting Corporation had featured Doc Neeson and The Angels in episode 4, "Berserk Warriors 1973-1981", of the TV music series, Long Way to the Top, which was an insight into Australian rock 'n' roll. Neeson was interviewed, together with Angus Young (of AC/DC), on starting their careers at pub rock venues. Neeson recalled "[t]he stench would just hit you and the atmosphere was overwhelming, like a real energy built out of the claustrophobia" while Young related "[t]hey would be throwing beer cans and I thought 'just keep moving' and that's how it all started".

In December 2003 he formed a band, Doc Neeson's Angels, to play The Angels' material. The line-up with Neeson was Jim Hilbun (ex-The Angels) on bass guitar; Peter Clarke (ex-The Ranch, see Keith Urban) on drums; Alan Mansfield on keyboards and Peter Northcote on guitar (both ex-Dragon). Other groups created by former members included The Angels, the Original Angels Band, Rick Brewster's Angels, the Angels with Dave Gleeson, and The Angels 100%.

In May 2005, Neeson also formed Red Phoenix, and they released a self-titled album. The group's lineup was Neeson, Hilbun, Northcote, with David Lowy and Fab Omodei. In 2006, Neeson was featured on a postage stamp for Australia Post as part of their "Australian Rock Posters The Stamps" collection. In August and September 2007 he toured with Doc Neeson's Angels for the Countdown Spectacular 2 tour.

During October and November 2007, Doc Neeson's Angels went on the "Tour de Force" tour of Iraq, Afghanistan and Kuwait, supporting the Australian troops. Neeson was presented with two military medals in Baghdad while touring across the Middle East as part of a morale-boosting concert series for Australian troops known as 'Tour de Force.'The band lineup for this tour consisted of Dave Leslie (guitar), Mick Skelton (drums), Sara Gray (bass) and Mitch Hutchinson (guitar).

In 2008 Doc Neeson reunited with other The Angels members: Rick and John Brewster, Bidstrup and Bailey — who have since done extensive national touring. Multiple Angels CD and DVD releases by Alberts Music coincided with the release by Albert Music of the 30th Anniversary edition of the "Face to Face" album, along with previously unreleased material and a DVD of a live concert in Melbourne "This is It Folks!" In August 2008, Neeson and his songwriting partners in The Angels, the Brewster brothers, were inducted into The Australian Songwriters Association Hall of Fame, in recognition of their songwriting contribution to Australian music. In 2009 Neeson toured nationally with The Angels and was named by the Australian-based Irish Echo newspaper as one of the Top 100 Irish People in Australia of all time. In April 2010 he performed with the Brewster brothers in "A Symphony of Angels" at the Adelaide Festival Theatre with The Adelaide Art Orchestra conducted by Rob John.

In 2010 he began a solo project. In November 2010 he played semi-acoustic concerts with a band including former The Angels bassist Jim Hilbun. For the time being he was still involved with The Angels and was preparing to record a new solo album. In 2012 the Doc Neeson band continued to perform across Australia. The band's lineup consisted of Mitch Hutchinson (guitar), Mark Fenwick (guitar), Dave Roberts (drums) and Justin Bianchi (bass).

== Personal life ==
Neeson's first marriage was to Dzintra in 1974. They had two sons, but the relationship ended after 15 years. Neeson admitted to being unfaithful "Regrettably, because things were going wrong between us, I started seeing other women from time to time, just flirtatious dates most of the time, but one woman that I met one night at a club after a show was Kym [Moore]". In 1991 Neeson proposed to Moore with an aeroplane banner "Kym, I love you. Marry me BPN" – their marriage lasted five years.

In early December 1999, three weeks prior to the Tour of Duty - Concert for the Troops in East Timor, Neeson had a car accident on the Sydney M4 Motorway, "I was living in the Blue Mountains at the time, I'd just come back from a rehearsal with John Farnham's band to go with the troops up to East Timor, and I was feeling great ... A car in front of me braked really hard, so I braked hard, and the truck behind didn't brake at all, so I got this bad whiplash injury and some spinal damage that made it very difficult for me to walk for the first few years".

Known for his physical live performances, he was warned by a back specialist that he ran the risk of needing to use a wheelchair if he kept performing. Paul Cashmere at Undercover website noted that he "still performed for the troops under a lot of pain and upon his return became a regular patient trying to overcome chronic back and neck pain as well as blurred vision".

=== Declining health and death ===
On 10 January 2013, Neeson's Facebook page announced that he had been diagnosed with a brain tumour and would undergo immediate treatment. The Angels 100% Tour management released a statement: "To all The Angels friends, fans, venues and media It is with deep regret and shock that The Angels have to announce that Mr Doc Neeson was admitted to hospital over the recent Christmas/New Year period. He has just been diagnosed with an aggressive form of cancer (brain tumour). This will require immediate intensive radiation and chemotherapy treatment and will continue for the next 6–7 months". John and Rick Brewster said: "Our thoughts are with Doc, his family and others close to him, and we wish him a speedy and complete recovery".

On 28 April 2014 the ABC TV series, Australian Story, broadcast an episode, "A Very Good Rascal", as a biographical documentary on Neeson, his musical career and his medical condition. Neeson died on 4 June 2014, aged 67, from his glioblastoma multiforme (brain tumour). His funeral was held on 11 June at St Michael's Church, Lane Cove. Neeson was survived by partner Anne Souter and his three sons.

Doc Neeson was posthumously inducted into the South Australian Music Hall Of Fame on 19 June 2015 at Northern Sound System, Elizabeth. Mark Gable (The Choirboys) performed and paid tribute to Doc and his family. Doc was also celebrated during the induction of The Moonshine Jug and String Band and Chris Bailey on 2 October 2015 at The Goodwood Institute.

== Awards and nominations ==
=== Australian Songwriter's Hall of Fame ===
The Australian Songwriters Hall of Fame was established in 2004 to honour the lifetime achievements of some of Australia's greatest songwriters.

Year	Nominee / work	Award	Result
2008	himself	Australian Songwriter's Hall of Fame	inducted

Doc was also awarded the Australian Service Medal by General Cosgrove for services to the troops in East Timor and the Australian Defence Medal for his service in the Royal Australian Regiment and the Royal Australian Army Education Corps.(ArmyNewspaper)

Angels lead singer Doc Neeson was presented with his Order of Australia OAM medal at Government House in Sydney, 26 January 2013.
