= Brent Eccles =

New Zealand-Australian drummer

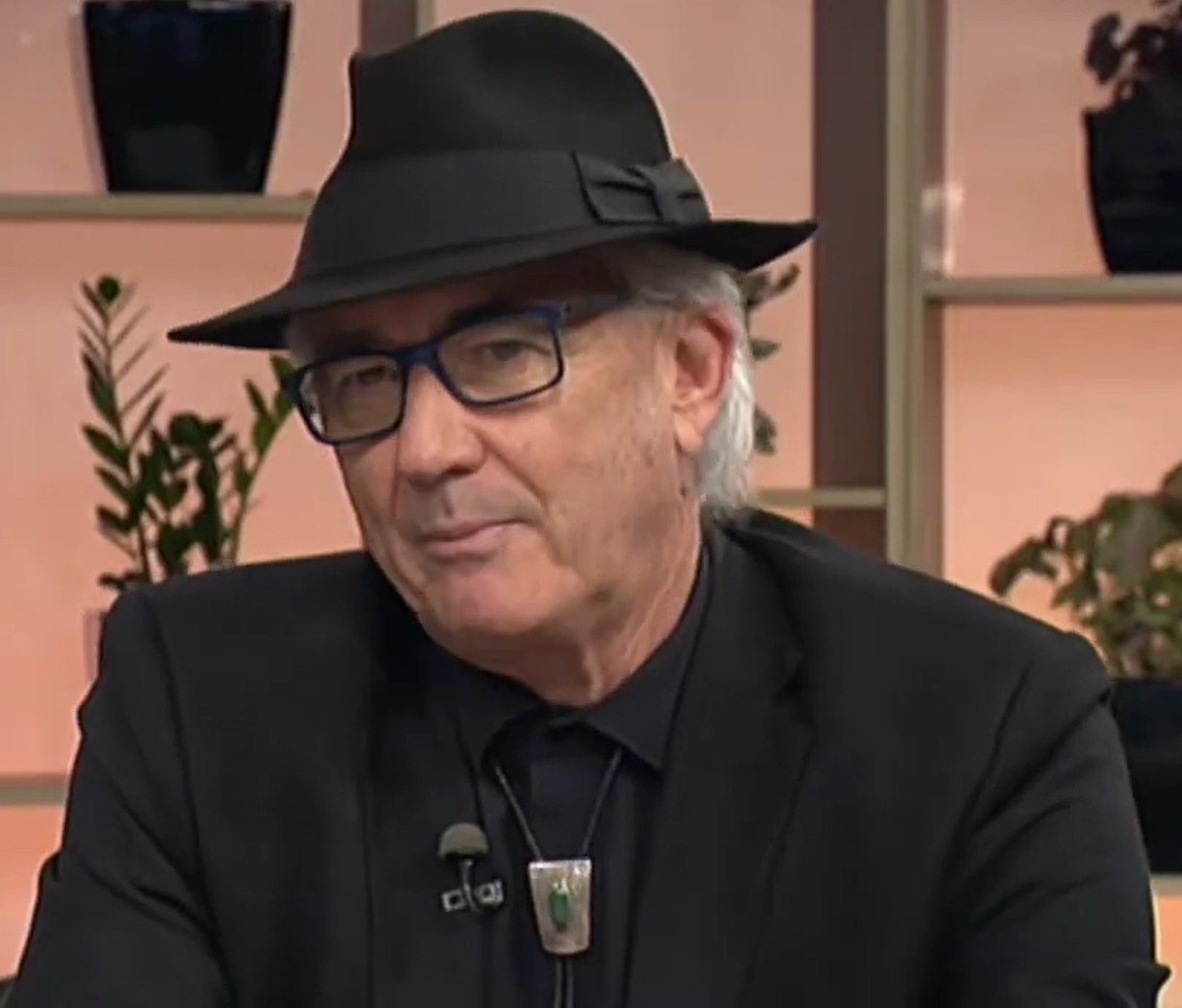
Eccles in 2018

Brent Eccles is a New Zealand drummer best known as a member of Australian rock band The Angels. He has also drummed in The Breed, Vox Pop, Stewart & The Belmonts, Streetalk, Space Waltz, After Hours, and Citizen Band.

Eccles left Citizen Band in 1981, after successfully auditioning for The Angels and remained there until they split up in 2000. During this time he also managed Johnny Diesel & The Injectors, The Poor and The Angels. He is the father of former Betchadupa drummer, and now Das Pop drummer Matt Eccles. Today Eccles lives in New Zealand and runs his own agency, Brent Eccles Entertainment, as well as representing Frontier Touring, A Day On The Green, and Liberation Music. Along with Campbell Smith, Eccles also heads Civic Events who run the annual Acoustic Church Tour and the Winery Tour.

In October 2018, he was presented with the Fullers Entertainment Award from the Variety Artists Club of New Zealand for his contribution to NZ entertainment as a promoter.
