= The Angels discography =

The Angels (Australian band) discography
- Studio albums: 13
- EPs: 8
- Live albums: 4
- Compilation albums: 10
- Singles: 46

The Australian hard rock band, the Angels, have released thirteen studio albums, four live albums, eight extended plays and forty-six singles. The Angels were formed in Adelaide in 1974 by the Brewster brothers, John and Rick, together with Bernard "Doc" Neeson. The line-up of the band has since gone through numerous changes with Rick as the mainstay member. They are known as Angel City internationally (to avoid confusion with 70s glam-rock band Angel.)

At the ARIA Music Awards of 1998 The Angels were inducted into the ARIA Hall of Fame.

== Albums ==
=== Studio albums ===
List of studio albums, with selected chart positions and certifications
Title	Album details	Peak chart positions				Certifications
Title	Album details	AUS	CAN	NZ	US	Certifications
The Angels	Released: August 1977; Label: Alberts (APLP-025), (465235 4); Formats: LP, MC	198	—	—		
Face to Face	Released: June 1978 (Note: Face to Face was issued, under the name Angel City, in March 1980 in the United States, Europe and Japan via Epic Records. It is a compilation of the Australian versions of Face to Face and No Exit. Billboard 200 chart peak relates to the international version and occurred in 1980.); Label: Alberts (APLP-031); Formats: LP	18	71	—	152	AUS: 4× platinum
No Exit	Released: June 1979; Label: Alberts (APLP-038); Formats: LP	8	—	—	—	AUS: Gold
Dark Room	Released: June 1980 (Note: Dark Room was issued by Angel City as Darkroom, in October 1980 in North America and Europe via Epic Records with a different track listing. Billboard 200 chart peak relates to the international version.); Label: Epic (ELPS 4061); Formats: LP	5	43	37	133	AUS: Platinum
Night Attack	Released: November 1981 (Note: Night Attack was issued by Angel City in February 1982 in North America and Europe via Epic Records with a different track listing. Billboard 200 chart peak relates to the international version in 1982.); Label: Epic (ELPS 4258); Formats: LP	13	30	14	174	AUS: Platinum
Watch the Red	Released: May 1983; Label: Epic (ELPS 4364); Formats: LP	6	—	43	—	AUS: Gold
Two Minute Warning	Released: 28 November 1984 (Note: Two Minute Warning was issued by Angel City in January 1985 in North America, Europe and Japan via Music Corporation of America with a different track listing.); Label: Mushroom (RML 53154); Formats: LP	2	—	31	201	
Howling	Released: October 1986; Label: Mushroom (RML 53226); Formats: LP, MC	6	—	10	—	ARIA: Platinum
Beyond Salvation	Released: June 1990 (Note: Beyond Salvation was issued internationally under the name the Angels from Angel City in November 1989. It was released in Australia in June 1990 by the Angels via Mushroom Records with a different track listing. Australian and New Zealand peaks relate to the latter version and occurred in 1990.); Label: Chrysalis (F2 21677); Formats: LP, CD	1	—	3	—	AUS: Platinum
Red Back Fever	Released: November 1991; Label: Mushroom (TVD93352, RMD53352); Formats: LP, CD	14	—	41	—	AUS: Gold
Skin & Bone	Released: March 1998; Label: Shock (Shock 0025); Formats: LP, CD	27	—	—	—	
Take It to the Streets	Released: 31 August 2012; Label: Liberation (LMCD0193); Formats: 2× CD	24	—	—	—	
Talk the Talk	Released: 17 January 2014; Label: Liberation (LMCD0235); Formats: CD	46	—	—		
Ninety Nine	Released: 28 June 2024; Label: Bloodlines (BLOOD117CD); Formats: LP, CD, digital	163	—	—	—	
"—" denotes a release that did not chart or was not issued in that region.

=== Live albums ===
List of live albums, with selected chart positions and certifications
Title	Album details	Peak chart positions		Certifications
Title	Album details	AUS	NZ	Certifications
Live Line	Released: December 1987; Label: Mushroom (L 59001/2, C 59001/2, CD 59001/2); Formats: 2× LP, 2× MC, 2× CD	3	13	
Live at the Basement (by the Original Angels Band)	Released: September 2005; Label: MGM (MGM TOAB001); Formats: CD	—	—	
Greatest Hits Live	Released: June 2011; Label: Liberation (LMCD 0136); Formats: CD	112	—	
40 Years of Rock – Vol 2: 40 Greatest Live Hits	Released: 2 May 2014; Label: Alberts/Liberation (LMCD0240); Formats: 3× CD	48	—	
The Wireless Show	Released: 11 June 2021; Label: Bloodlines; Formats: DD, streaming	—	—	
"—" denotes a release that did not chart or was not issued in that region.

=== Compilation albums ===
List of compilation albums, with selected chart positions and certifications
Title	Album details	Peak chart positions		Certifications
Title	Album details	AUS	NZ	Certifications
The Angels' Greatest	Released: May 1980; Label: Alberts (APLP-043, TC-APLP-043); Formats: LP, MC, CD	5	—	AUS: Platinum
The Angels' Greatest Vol. II	Released: November 1985 (Note: The Angels' Greatest Vol. II was re-released as No Secrets in 1998 on Shock Records.); Label: Epic (ELPS 4516); Formats: LP	38	—	
Their Finest Hour... and Then Some	Released: October 1992; Label: Alberts/Mushroom (472250 2); Formats: CD	76	—	
Evidence	Released: December 1994; Label: Mushroom (TVD93368, RMD53368); Formats: CD	30	44	AUS: Gold
Greatest Hits: The Mushroom Years / Best Of	Released: May 1999; Label: Mushroom (MUSH33181.2); Formats: CD	182	—	
The Complete Sessions 1980-1983	Released: 24 June 2002 (Note: The Complete Sessions 1980-1983 contains three previously released albums, Dark Room, Night Attack and Watch the Red; together with The Blow.); Label: Shock Records (ANGELSBOX1); Formats: 4× CD boxed set	—	—	
Wasted Sleepless Nights: The Definitive Best Of	Released: July 2006; Label: Liberation (BLUE 123.2); Formats: CD	22	16	
Greatest Hits	Released: 25 November 2011; Label: Liberation (LMCD0156); Formats: CD	26	—	ARIA: platinum
40 Years of Rock – Vol 1: 40 Greatest Studio Hits	Released: 2 May 2014; Label: Alberts, Liberation (LMCD0239); Formats: 3× CD	20	—	
Brothers, Angels & Demons	Released: 4 August 2017; Label: Liberation; Formats: CD	154	—	
"—" denotes a release that did not chart or was not issued in that region.

=== Extended plays ===
List of extended plays, with selected chart positions
Title	Album details	Peak chart positions
Title	Album details	AUS
Out of the Blue	Released: October 1979; Label: Alberts (AS37); Formats: 12"	29
Never So Live	Released: October 1981; Label: Epic (EX12016); Formats: 12"	17
Four Play Volume 6	Released: 1987; Label: Epic; Formats: CD	—
Live from Angel City (by The Angels from Angel City)	Released: 1988; Label: Telegraph Records (ACE 001); Formats: 12"	—
Hard Evidence	Released: May 1995; Label: Mushroom (D13016); Formats: CD	120
Ivory Stairs	Released: 2007; Label: The Angels (TAIS2007); Formats: CD (limited to 1,000 copies)	—
Tour EP 2008	Released: July 2008; Label: Albert/Sony; Formats: CD	53
Triple M Oztober Live	Released: November 2019; Label: Bloodlines; Formats: Digital download, streaming; Recorded in October 2019	—
Under the Stone	Released: 5 June 2020; Label: Bloodlines; Formats: Digital download, streaming	—
"—" denotes a release that did not chart or was not issued in that region.

== Singles ==
List of singles, with selected chart positions and certifications
Title	Year	Peak chart positions			Certifications	Album
Title	Year	AUS	NZ	US Main	Certifications	Album
"Am I Ever Gonna See Your Face Again"	1976	58	—	—		The Angels
"You're a Lady Now"	1977	90	—	—		The Angels
"Comin' Down"	1978	80	—	—		Face to Face
"Take a Long Line"	1978	29	—	—		Face to Face
"Straight Jacket"	1978	—	—	—		Face to Face
"After the Rain" (Note: "After the Rain" is also titled The Tour as it featured two live tracks as the singles' B-side. However the catalogue numbering is consistent with single catalogue numbering at the time)	1978	52	—	—		Face to Face
"Shadow Boxer"	1979	25	—	—		No Exit
"No Secrets"	1980	8	—	—		Dark Room
"Poor Baby"	1980	72	—	—		Dark Room
"Face the Day"	1980	67	30	—		Dark Room
"Into the Heat"	1981	14	—	—		Non-album single
"Night Attack"	1982	84	—	—		Night Attack
"Living on the Outside"	1982	—	—	—		Night Attack
"Stand Up"	1982	21	—	—		Watch the Red
"Eat City"	1983	22	—	—		Watch the Red
"Live Lady Live"	1983	43	—	—		Watch the Red
"Is That You?	1983	—	—	—		Watch the Red
"Between the Eyes"	1984	44	—	—		Two Minute Warning
"Look the Other Way"	1985	55	—	—		Two Minute Warning
"Sticky Little Bitch"	1985	77	—	—		Two Minute Warning
"Underground"	1985	55	—	35		Two Minute Warning
"Nature of the Beast"	1986	27	—	—		Howling
"Don't Waste My Time"	1986	40	38	—		Howling
"We Gotta Get out of This Place"	1986	7	13	—		Howling
"Can't Take Any More"	1987	63	—	—		Howling
"Am I Ever Gonna See Your Face Again" (live)	1988	11	—	—		Live Line
"Love Takes Care" (live)	1988	—	—	—		Live Line
"Finger on the Trigger"	1988	34	—	—		Non-album single
"Let the Night Roll On"	1990	17	—	—		Beyond Salvation
"Dogs Are Talking"	1990	11	12	—	AUS: Gold	Beyond Salvation
"Back Street Pickup"	1990	23	29	—		Beyond Salvation
"Rhythm Rude Girl"	1990	77	—	—		Beyond Salvation
"Bleeding with the Times"	1991	54	—	—		Beyond Salvation
"Some of That Love"	1991	53	—	—		Red Back Fever
"Once Bitten, Twice Shy"	1992	43	32	—		Red Back Fever
"Tear Me Apart"	1992	33	—	—		Red Back Fever
"Don't Need Mercy"	1994	75	—	—		Evidence
"Turn It On"	1994	77	—	—		Evidence
"Call That Living"	1996	—	—	—		Skin & Bone
"Caught in the Night"	1997	78	—	—		Skin & Bone
"Northwest Highway"	1997	173	—	—		Skin & Bone
"My Light Will Shine"	1998	135	—	—		Skin & Bone
"Waiting For The Sun"	2012	—	—	—		Take It to the Streets
"One Word"	2019	—	—	—		non-album single
"Under the Stone"	2020	—	—	—		Under the Stone
"Ninety Nine (Go For Broke)"	2024	—	—	—		Ninety Nine
"—" denotes a release that did not chart or was not issued in that region.

== Video albums ==
Title	Details	Certification
Live At Narara	Released: 1988; Label: Festival Records; Format: VHS	
From All Angles 1980-1990	Released: 1990; Label: Mushroom Records; Format: VHS	
Beyond Salvation Live	Released: 1990; Label: Mushroom Records; Format: VHS	
Live @ The Basement	Released: 2006; Label: Chief Entertainment, Warner Music Australia; Format: DVD	
Live At Narara & Beyond Salvation Live	Released: 2007; Label: Liberation Music; Format: 2x DVD	ARIA: Gold
Wasted Sleepless Nights, The Definitive Greatest Hits	Released: 2007; Label: Liberation Music; Format: DVD	ARIA: Gold
This Is It Folks...Over the Top	Released: 2008; Label: Sony; Format: DVD	ARIA: Gold
No Way Get F*#ked F*#k Off!	Released: 2008; Label: Beyond Home Entertainment; Format: DVD	
Symphony of Angels	Released: 2019; Label: Bloodlines; Format: DVD	
The Wireless Show	Released: 2021; Label: Bloodlines; Format: DVD	

== Other appearances ==
Year	Track(s)	Album	Catalogue no.
1998	"Dogs Are Talking"; "We Gotta Get out of This Place" (VHS only)	Mushroom 25 Live	MUSH25.2 (CD), MUSH25.8 (VHS)
2001	"Morning Train (9 to 5)"	The Andrew Denton Breakfast Show - Musical Challenge Vol. 2	5041282000
2003	"Take a Long Line"; "No Secrets"; "I Ain't the One"; "Marseilles"	Gimme Ted – The Ted Mulry Benefit Concerts (by Members of the Angels)	2564600802
