= 40 Years of Rock – Vol 1: 40 Greatest Studio Hits =

40 Years of Rock Vol. 1: 40 Greatest Studio Hits

Greatest hits album by The Angels
- Released: 2 May 2014
- Genre: Hard rock
- Label: Liberation Music

The Angels chronology
Talk the Talk (2014)	40 Years of Rock Vol. 1: 40 Greatest Studio Hits (2014)	40 Years of Rock – Vol 2: 40 Greatest Live Hits (2014)

40 Years of Rock – Vol 1: 40 Greatest Studio Hits is a three-disc greatest hits album by Australian hard rock group, the Angels, released on 2 May 2014. The album includes 40 songs from The Angels career spanning the years 1974–2014. It reached No. 20 on the ARIA Albums Chart.

== Reception ==
Amazon.com editorial reviewer described the album, "four decades of hits, four decades of touring and the legendary Australian are still making great music." Alasdair McDonald of The Sydney Morning Herald reviewed both the studio album and its live album companion, 40 Years of Rock – Vol 2: 40 Greatest Live Hits and rated them as four out of five stars, he felt that they are "a homage to one of the most-loved and influential bands to come out of Adelaide. The band's influence spread far and wide, from Guns N' Roses to Pearl Jam and Nirvana, and their music helped spawn the Seattle grunge movement from half-way around the world." Peter Hackney of Altmedia opined that "this compilation shows why they’re the quintessential Aussie pub rock band."

== Track listing ==
All tracks written by Bernard Neeson, John Brewster and Richard Brewster except where noted.

Disc 1

1. Am I Ever Gonna See Your Face Again – 3:20
2. Round We Go – 6:16
3. Shelter From the Rain (John Brewster, Graham Bidstrup) – 3:59
4. Whitest Lady (Richard Brewster-Jones, Graham Leslie Bidstrup) – 5:34
5. After the Rain – 3:10
6. Take a Long Line – 3:01
7. Marseilles – 4:50
8. Be With You – 3:43
9. I Ain't the One – 2:32
10. Comin' Down – 3:22
11. Who Rings the Bell – 3:18
12. Save Me – 4:08
13. Shadow Boxer – 2:43
14. Can't Shake It – 4:55
15. No Exit – 6:34
16. Out of the Blue – 3:14
17. Mr. Damage – 3:36
18. Ivory Stairs – 3:53
19. No Secrets (Graham Bidstrup, Doc Neeson) – 4:17
20. Poor Baby (John Brewster, Rick Brewster) – 4:03

Disc 2

1. Wasted Sleepless Nights/Dark Room – 6:08
2. Face the Day – 6:06
3. Devil's Gate – 5:34
4. Fashion and Fame – 4:37
5. Night Attack (John Brewster, Richard Brewster, Doc Neeson, Brent Eccles) – 3:30
6. Eat City (Richard Brewster, Doc Neeson) – 3:23
7. Watch the Red – 5:03
8. Stand Up (Jim Hilbun) – 3:17
9. Small Price (Brent Eccles, John Brewster, Rick Brewster) – 5:25
10. We Gotta Get out of This Place (Barry Mann, Cynthia Weil) – 4:39
11. Don't Waste My Time (Bob Spencer, Richard Brewster) – 3:51
12. Let the Night Roll On (Richard Brewster, Doc Neeson, Amanda Miller) – 4:02
13. Back Street Pick Up (Bob Spencer, Richard Brewster, Doc Neeson, Terry Manning, James Morley) – 4:22
14. Dogs Are Talking (Richard Brewster, Bob Spencer, Doc Neeson, Brent Eccles, James Morley) – 3:24
15. Turn It On (Bob Spencer, Brent Eccles, Doc Neeson, Richard Brewster) – 4:17
16. Call That Living (Richard Brewster, Jim Hilbun, Doc Neeson) – 3:01
17. My Light Will Shine (John Brewster, Richard Brewster) – 4:29
18. Waiting For the Sun (Joe Burnham, Richard Brewster, John Brewster) – 4:48
19. Talk the Talk (John Brewster, Marcus Ahern, Rick Brewster) – 4:59
20. Broken Windows (Dave Gleeson, John Brewster) – 3:51

== Personnel ==
- Doc Neeson – vocals (tracks: 1, 2, 3, 4, 5, 6, 7, 8, 9, 10 to 35)
- John Brewster – rhythm guitar, harmonica, vocals (tracks: 1 to 35)
- Richard Brewster – guitar
- Graham Bidstrup – drums
- Dave Gleeson – vocals ("My Light Will Shine", "Waiting for the Sun", Talk the Talk & "Broken Windows")
- Chris Bailey — bass guitar, vocals
- Brent Eccles — drums
- Jim Hilbun – bass guitar

== Charts ==
Chart (2014)	Peak position
Australian Albums (ARIA)	20
