= Greatest Hits (The Angels album) =

Compilation album by The Angels
- Released: 25 November 2011
- Genre: Hard rock
- Length: 1:19:53
- Label: Liberation

The Angels chronology
Wasted Sleepless Nights – The Definitive Best Of (2006)	Greatest Hits (2011)	Take It to the Streets (2012)

Greatest Hits is a compilation album by Australian hard rock band The Angels, released in November 2011. Greatest Hits peaked at number 26 on the ARIA Charts. It was certified platinum by the Australian Recording Industry Association in 2015.

The album includes nine live songs: "Am I Ever Gonna See Your Face Again", "Comin' Down", "Take a Long Line", "I Ain't the One", "Marseilles", "After the Rain", "Be with You", "Shadow Boxer" and "Mr Damage". A deluxe version was released simultaneously containing a DVD with 39 videos by the band.

== Track listing ==
All tracks are written by Bernard Patrick Neeson, John Carrington Brewster-Jones and Richard Brewster-Jones, except where noted.

No.	Title	Writer(s)	Length
1.	"Am I Ever Gonna See Your Face Again" (Live)		4:18
2.	"Comin' Down" (Live)		4:07
3.	"Take a Long Line" (Live)		4:50
4.	"I Ain't the One" (Live)		2:31
5.	"Marseilles" (Live)		10:12
6.	"After the Rain" (Live)		5:01
7.	"Be with You" (Live)		4:07
8.	"Shadow Boxer" (Live)		2:40
9.	"Mr Damage" (Live)		4:28
10.	"No Secrets"	Graham Bidstrup, Doc Neeson	4:19
11.	"Face the Day"		5:56
12.	"Fashion & Fame"		4:38
13.	"Stand Up" (Jim Hilbun)		3:15
14.	"Eat City"	Richard Brewster, Doc Neeson	3:24
15.	"Don't Waste My Time"	Bob Spencer, Richard Brewster	3:52
16.	"We've Gotta Get Out Of This Place"	Barry Mann, Cynthia Weil	4:39
17.	"Let The Night Roll On"	Richard Brewster, Doc Neeson, Amanda Miller	4:04
18.	"Dogs Are Talking"	Richard Brewster, Bob Spencer, Doc Neeson, Brent Eccles, James Morley	3:23
Total length:			01:19:53

== Personnel ==
- Chris Bailey – bass guitar
- Graham "Buzz" Bidstrup – drums
- John Brewster – guitar
- Rick Brewster – rhythm guitar
- Doc Neeson – lead vocals
- Bob Spencer – rhythm guitar, backing vocals
- James Morley – bass guitar, backing vocals
- Brent Eccles – drums
- Grin Creative – design

== Charts ==
Chart (2011–2014)	Peak position
Australian Albums (ARIA)	26

== Certifications ==
Region	Certification	Certified units/sales
Australia (ARIA)	Platinum	70,000^{^}
^{^} Shipments figures based on certification alone.
