= Live Line =

Live album by The Angels
- Released: December 1987
- Recorded: 1983–1987
- Genre: Hard rock
- Length: 48:25
- Label: Mushroom
- Producer: The Angels

The Angels chronology
Howling (1986)	Live Line (1987)	Beyond Salvation (1990)

Singles from Live Line
- 1. "Am I Ever Gonna See Your Face Again" Released: January 1988; 2. "Love Takes Care" Released: 30 May 1988

Professional ratings
Review scores
Source	Rating
Collector's Guide to Heavy Metal	8/10

Live Line is double live album by Australian hard rock band The Angels originally released in December 1987. It reached No. 3 in Australia and No.14 in New Zealand.

== Description ==
The collection spanned ten years of the band's career. The majority of the album was recorded at the Bankstown RSL Club in Sydney, with some tracks taken from earlier tours featuring John Brewster. A live version of "Am I Ever Gonna See Your Face Again" was issued as a single, as was a medley of "Love Takes Care" and "Be with You". Following the success of the album, The Angels embarked on a massive tour of Australia with a lengthy three-hour show, with three sets chronologically spanning a significant portion of the band's history. The remastered CD version was released on 8 February 1999 by Shock Records as a double live album and included several songs not included on the vinyl release.

== Reception ==
Smash Hits said, "It could hardly fail with half the songs being basically the band's greatest hits with a whole heap of lesser known but equally excellent tracks that drive audiences wild across the nation. The recording quality is impeccable."

== Track listings ==
Disc 1

1. "Comin' Down" – 4:28
2. "No Secrets" – 4:42
3. "Did You Hurt Somebody" – 3:26
4. "Standing over You" – 3:01
5. "Shadow Boxer" – 2:41
6. "After the Rain" – 5:07
7. "Small Price" – 4:47
8. "Fashion and Fame" – 4:49
9. "Love Takes Care" – 4:39
10. "Be with You" – 4:07
11. "Run for the Shelter" – 3:59
12. "Save Me" – 4:23
13. "Underground" – 6:58

Disc 2

1. "Back on You" – 4:12
2. "Am I Ever Gonna See Your Face Again" – 3:15
3. "Stand Up" – 4:10
4. "Don't Waste My Time" – 5:17
5. "Face the Day" – 3:28
6. "City Out of Control" – 9:53
7. "Eat City" – 5:03
8. "Small Talk" – 3:25
9. "Take a Long Line" – 5:24
10. "Mr. Damage" – 4:28
11. "Marseilles" – 10:16

=== Remastered CD edition ===
Disc 1

1. "Comin' Down" – 4:28
2. "No Secrets" – 4:42
3. "Did You Hurt Somebody" – 3:26
4. "Standing over You" – 3:01
5. "Shadow Boxer" – 2:41
6. "After the Rain" – 5:07
7. "Small Price" – 4:47
8. "Fashion and Fame" – 4:49
9. "Love Takes Care" – 4:39
10. "Be with You" – 4:07
11. "Run for the Shelter" – 3:59
12. "Save Me" – 4:23
13. "Underground" – 6:58
14. "Back on You" – 4:12
15. "Am I Ever Gonna See Your Face Again" – 3:15
16. "Stand Up" – 4:10
17. "Don't Waste My time" – 5:17
18. "Face the Day" – 3:28

Disc 2

1. "City Out of Control" – 9:53
2. "Eat City" – 5:03
3. "Small Talk" – 3:25
4. "Take a Long Line" – 5:24
5. "Mr. Damage" – 4:28
6. "Marseilles" – 10:16
7. "Nothin to Win" – 5:14
8. "Night Comes Early" – 3:59
9. "Into the Heat" – 3:16
10. "Long Night" – 4:17
11. "Easy Prey" – 3:22
12. "Is That You?" – 3:48
13. "No Sleep in Hell" – 5:25
14. "Talk About You" – 3:46
15. "Gonna Leave You" – 3:04
16. "I Ain't the One" – 2:56

== Personnel ==
The Angels

- Doc Neeson – lead vocals, acoustic guitar
- Rick Brewster – lead guitar, acoustic guitar
- John Brewster – rhythm guitar, backing vocals (1981-1983 recordings)
- Bob Spencer – rhythm guitar, acoustic guitar, backing vocals
- Jim Hilbun – bass guitar, lead vocals on "Back on You", backing vocals, saxophone
- Brent Eccles – drums, tambourine

Production

- Andrew Scott, Howard Page, Ross Cockle – live recordings engineers
- Bill Price – mixing

== Charts ==
=== Weekly charts ===
Chart (1987/88)	Peak position
Australian (Kent Music Report)	3
New Zealand Albums Chart	10

=== Year-end charts ===
Chart (1988)	Peak position
Australian (ARIA Charts)	32
