= The Angels' Greatest =

The Angels Greatest

Greatest hits album by The Angels
- Released: May 1980
- Studio: Albert Studios
- Genre: Hard rock
- Length: 41:29
- Label: Albert Productions
- Producer: The Angels, Harry Vanda, George Young

The Angels chronology
Out of the Blue (EP) (1979)	The Angels Greatest (1980)	Dark Room (1980)

The Angels Greatest is the first greatest hits album by Australian hard rock group, The Angels, released in May 1980. It peaked at No. 5 on the Kent Music Report Albums Chart. It was the group's final released on Albert Productions.

== Track listing ==
All tracks are written by Bernard Patrick Neeson, John Carrington Brewster-Jones and Richard Brewster-Jones, except where noted

No.	Title	Length
1.	"Take a Long Line"	3:01
2.	"Shadow Boxer"	2:41
3.	"Be with You"	3:43
4.	"Marseilles"	4:50
5.	"Who Rings the Bell"	3:12
6.	"I Ain't the One"	2:31
7.	"Am I Ever Gonna See Your Face Again"	3:50
8.	"You Got Me Runnin'"	4:54
9.	""Out of the Blue""	3:18
10.	"Shelter from the Rain" (Graham Leslie Bidstrup, John Carrington Brewster-Jones)	4:00
11.	"Save Me"	4:08
12.	""Comin' Down""	3:21

== Personnel ==
- The Angels – producers
- Vanda & Young – producers (consultants)
- Mark Opitz – producer, engineer
- Doc Neeson – vocals
- Chris Bailey – bass
- Graham "Buzz" Bidstrup – vocals, drums
- Rick Brewster – vocals, lead guitar
- John Brewster – vocals, rhythm guitar

== Charts ==
Chart (1980)	Peak position
Australian (Kent Music Report)	5

== Certifications ==
Region	Certification	Certified units/sales
Australia (ARIA)	Platinum	50,000^{^}
^{^} Shipments figures based on certification alone.
