= Face to Face (The Angels album) =

Studio album by the Angels
- Released: 1 June 1978
- Studio: Albert Studios, Sydney
- Genre: Hard rock
- Length: 36:13
- Label: Albert
- Producer: The Angels, Mark Opitz

The Angels chronology
The Angels (1977)	Face to Face (1978)	No Exit (1979)

Singles from Face to Face
- 1. "Comin' Down" Released: March 1978; 2. "Take a Long Line" Released: July 1978; 3. "Straight Jacket" Released: August 1978; 4. "After the Rain" Released: November 1978

Face to Face is the second studio album by Australian hard rock band the Angels, released in June 1978. It was co-produced by the band with Mark Opitz, which peaked at No. 18 on the Kent Music Report Albums Chart. For shipment of 280,000 copies, it was accredited as 4× platinum.

The international version was released in March 1980 under the band name, Angel City, as a compilation of tracks from both the Australian version of Face to Face and from their third studio album, No Exit (June 1979). It also included a re-recorded version of "Am I Ever Gonna See Your Face Again", which had been issued as their debut single in March 1976 from their first album, The Angels.

The album cover was designed by Peter Ledger and won the King of Pop award for 'Best Album Cover Design' in 1978. In October 2010, Face to Face was listed in the book, 100 Best Australian Albums. The international version of album was reissued on CD by Rock Candy Records in 2011.

== Reception ==
Professional ratings
Review scores
Source	Rating
AllMusic	3/5 stars
Collector's Guide to Heavy Metal	10/10

Australian musicologist, Ian McFarlane, described Face to Face as a "watershed" release for both the group and Mark Opitz. Ed Nimmervoll of Howlspace website opined that it "delivered a tough blend of punk and metal. The band brought it home on stage behind their theatrical lead singer, jumping and gesturing maniacally, highlighting the drama in the lyrics. In every way they were one of the most exciting bands in the country, and exhaustive touring brought the band a generation of loyal fans." John Floyd of AllMusic declared of the international version, "This roaring Australian combo displays their AC/DC-cum-punk hearts on a powerful US debut." Canadian journalist Martin Popoff described the band as "a more new-wavey, more intelligent and busier version" of AC/DC and praised the 1980s version of the album for being "a solid barroom collection of unassuming yet infectious roots rockers, riding the line between stiff hard rock and base metal".

== Track listings ==
Credits adapted from the original LP releases.

=== 1978 Australian version ===
All tracks are written by John Brewster (as John Carrington Brewster-Jones), Rick Brewster (as Richard Brewster-Jones), and Doc Neeson (as Bernard Patrick Neeson).

Side one
No.	Title	Length
1.	"Straight Jacket"	3:17
2.	"After the Rain"	3:08
3.	"Love Takes Care"	3:40
4.	"Take a Long Line"	2:58
5.	"Marseilles"	4:47

Side two
No.	Title	Length
6.	"Live It Up"	3:49
7.	"Be with You"	3:41
8.	"Outcast"	4:42
9.	"I Ain't the One"	2:29
10.	"Comin' Down"	3:19

=== 1980 International version ===
All tracks are written by John Brewster (as John Carrington Brewster-Jones), Rick Brewster (as Richard Brewster-Jones), and Doc Neeson (as Bernard Patrick Neeson).

Side one
No.	Title	Length
1.	"Take a Long Line"	2:58
2.	"Marseilles"	4:47
3.	"After the Rain"	3:08
4.	"Am I Ever Gonna See Your Face Again"	3:40
5.	"Shadow Boxer"	2:44

Side two
No.	Title	Length
6.	"Comin' Down"	3:19
7.	"Out of the Blue"	3:17
8.	"Can't Shake It"	4:49
9.	"Waiting for the World"	3:13
10.	"No Exit"	6:44

== Personnel ==
- Doc Neeson – lead vocals
- Rick Brewster – lead guitar
- John Brewster – rhythm guitar
- Chris Bailey – bass guitar
- Graham "Buzz" Bidstrup – drums

Production

- Producer – The Angels, Mark Opitz
- Cover artwork – Peter Ledger

== Charts ==
Chart performance for Face to Face
Chart (1978)	Peak position
Australian Albums (Kent Music Report)	18

== Certifications ==
Certifications for Face to Face
Region	Certification	Certified units/sales
Australia (ARIA)	4× Platinum	280,000^{^}
^{^} Shipments figures based on certification alone.
