= The Stetsons =

- Origin: Sydney, New South Wales, Australia
- Years active: 1987–1997
- Labels: Mercury, Larrikin

The Stetsons were an Australian country and western band formed by members of GANGgajang, Mental As Anything and Flying Emus. They released a self-titled album in 1987 and played a few live shows, including at the Tamworth music Festival for the next two years. In 1997 the bands producer, Graham "Buzz" Bidstrup and his friend Andrew Richardson, made a record with former ABC JJJ sound engineer Keith Walker in Jimmy Barnes old studio. The album was called Their Most Successful Album...Ever. The band released three singles with videos and the debut single "There's A Train In My Head" was used in Crocodile Dundee II. Their music was also heard in the film Tender Hooks.

== Members ==
- Chris Bailey (bass) – The Angels, GANGgajang, Jimmy Barnes Band, Dave Steel Band
- Jeff "Skunk" Baxter (vocals) – Doobie Brothers
- Kayellen Bee (vocals) – GANGgajang
- Graham "Buzz" Bidstrup (drums, keyboards) – The Angels, The Party Boys, GANGgajang
- Mark Callaghan (vocals) – GANGgajang, Riptides
- Marilyn Delaney (vocals) – GANGgajang
- Wayne Goodwin (fiddle) – Flying Emus, Dave Steel Band
- Robert James (guitar) – GANGgajang, Wendy Matthews Band
- Pixie Jenkins (fiddle) – John Williamson, Jimmy Barnes Band
- Rick Melick (piano and hammond organ)
- Mark Moffatt ( pedal steel, electric and acoustic guitar)
- Reg Mombassa (guitar, vocals, keyboards) – Mental As Anything, Reg and Pete's Dog Trumpet
- Peter O'Doherty (bass) – Mental As Anything, Reg and Pete's Dog Trumpet
- Rose Pearse (vocals)
- Martin Plaza (vocals, guitar) – Mental As Anything
- Andrew Richardson (acoustic guitar)
- Ian Simpson (banjo) – Flying Emus
- Geoff Stapleton (keyboards, guitar) – GANGgajang, Rockmelons, Absent Friends, The Dukes, Aliens
- Dave Steel (steel and slide guitar)

== Discography ==
=== Albums ===
- The Stetsons – Mercury (1987)
- Their Most Successful Record... Ever – Larrikin (1997)

=== Singles ===
- "Train In My Head"/"Path Of Stone"/"Train In My Head" (instrumental) – Mercury (1987)
- "Bad Blood"/"Back To Tamworth" (instrumental)/"Train In My Head" (live) – Mercury (1987)
