= True to the Tone =

Compilation album by GANGgajang
- Released: 1990
- Recorded: Various
- Genre: World
- Label: Shock Records

GANGgajang chronology
GangAGAIN (1987)	True to the Tone (1990)	Lingo (1994)

True to the Tone is a compilation album released by GANGgajang in 1990. Songs are mostly from their first two studio albums.

== Track listing ==
All songs written by Mark Callaghan unless otherwise indicated.

1. "Gimme Some Lovin" (Callaghan, Graham Bidstrup) - 2:43
2. "Sounds of Then (This is Australia)" - 3:53
3. "Distraction" - 3:21
4. "Maybe I" (Bidstrup, Callaghan) - 3:35
5. "Ambulance Men" - 3:24
6. "The Bigger They Are" - 3:29
7. "Giver of Life" (Geoffrey Stapleton, Chris Bailey, Callaghan, Bidstrup, Kayellen Bidstrup a.k.a. Kay Bee) - 3:38
8. "Shadow of Your Love" (Bidstrup, Callaghan) - 3:05
9. "To the North" (Bidstrup, Callaghan) - 2:46
10. "House of Cards" - 2:45
11. "Tree of Love"
12. "Luck of the Irish"
13. "In Spite of Love" (Geoffrey Stapleton)
14. "Roof Only Leaks (When It's Raining)" (Graham Bidstrup, Robert James, Callaghan, Kayellen Bidstrup)
15. "Initiation" (Callaghan, G Bidstrup)
16. "American Money" (Stapleton)
17. "Beat Me into Submission" (Callaghan, Stapleton, James, Bailey, Bidstrup)
18. "Noisy Talking (Part 2)" (M Gorman, Callaghan, Bidstrup)
19. "Initiation" (Instrumental Surf Mix) (Callaghan, Bidstrup)
20. "Sounds of Then" (Instrumental Surf Mix)
