= No Exit (The Angels album) =

Studio album by The Angels
- Released: June 1979
- Studio: Albert Studios, Sydney
- Genre: Hard rock
- Length: 42:17
- Label: Albert
- Producer: The Angels, Mark Opitz

The Angels chronology
Face to Face (1978)	No Exit (1979)	Out of the Blue (EP) (1979)

Singles from No Exit
- 1. "Shadow Boxer" Released: June 1979

Professional ratings
Review scores
Source	Rating
AllMusic	4/5 stars

No Exit is the third studio album by Australian rock band The Angels, released in June 1979. It reached No. 8 on the Australian album charts in July. One single was released from the album, "Shadow Boxer", which reached No. 25 on the charts in June.

On cover notes included with the 2008 reissue, John and Rick Brewster commented on songs including "After Dark" ("One of the best songs Brewster/Neeson/Brewster have ever written and recorded"); "Save Me" ("Written in the studio using a drum loop, sped up after writing 'No Exit'"), "Shadow Boxer" ("Inspired by a guy sparring with a no standing sign in Kings Cross") and "Out of the Blue" ("One of our finest songs. The high voice on the first 'baby' is George Young").

On "Mr Damage", John Brewster explained that it was "in part inspired by a head banger at the infamous Comb and Cutter at Blacktown called Brain Damage. Fans used to come to the shows with banners saying, 'Mr Damage, please play it!'" Rick Brewster added: "After meeting 'Brain Damage' backstage I drove home to Ashfield singing a verse melody all the way. I stayed up all night and finished the first draft of 'Mr Damage' some time in the afternoon. I then played it to the guys in the dressing room that night at the Stagedoor Tavern."

== Reception ==
Reviewed in Australian music magazine Roadrunner, it was said that, "The essential element of banality present in all pop music is balanced here by considerable invention and power and a maturity that permits the whole to be both simple and sophisticated. The lyrics are a strange combination of urbanity, paranoia and passion." The reviewer advised readers to "get pissed" at an Angels show, as they "might learn something."

== Track listings ==
Credits adapted from the original releases. All songs by John Brewster, Doc Neeson and Rick Brewster.

Side one

1. "Waiting for the World" – 3:22
2. "After Dark" – 5:04
3. "Save Me" – 4:07
4. "Shadow Boxer" – 2:40
5. "No Exit" – 6:34

Side two

1. "Can't Shake It" – 4:53
2. "Out of the Blue" – 3:17
3. "Dawn Is Breaking" – 4:50
4. "Mr Damage" – 3:36
5. "Ivory Stairs" – 3:54

2008 reissue bonus tracks (Live at La Trobe University)

1. "Waiting for the World" – 3:43
2. "Save Me" – 4:13
3. "Shadow Boxer" – 2:42
4. "No Exit" – 7:18
5. "Out of the Blue" – 3:57
6. "Ivory Stairs" – 5:43

== Personnel ==
The Angels

- Doc Neeson – lead vocals
- Rick Brewster – lead guitar
- John Brewster – rhythm guitar
- Chris Bailey – bass guitar
- Graham "Buzz" Bidstrup – drums

Production

- Mark Opitz – producer, engineer
- Vanda & Young – consulting producers

== Charts ==
Chart (1979–80)	Peak position
Australian Albums (Kent Music Report)	8

== Certifications and sales ==
Region	Certification	Certified units/sales
Australia (ARIA)	Gold	20,000^{^}
^{^} Shipments figures based on certification alone.
