= Live at the Basement =

Live at the Basement may refer to:

- Live at the Basement (Renée Geyer album), 1986
- Live at the Basement (Brother Henry album), 2004
- Live at the Basement (The Angels album), 2005
