= Oceans and Deserts =

Studio album by GANGgajang
- Released: 18 October 2002
- Recorded: 2001–02
- Label: Shock Records
- Producer: Robert James; Graham "Buzz" Bidstrup; GANGgajang

GANGgajang chronology
Chronologica (2000)	Oceans and Deserts (2002)

Oceans and Deserts is GANGgajang's fourth studio album. It was released on the independent Shock label in October 2002.

== Track listing ==
All tracks written by Mark Callaghan unless otherwise indicated.

1. "Nomadsland" (Robert James)
2. "Time (and The Mandelbrot Set)"
3. "Anodyne Dream"
4. "Carioca Girl" (Callaghan, James)
5. "These Years" (Callaghan, James)
6. "I Will"
7. "Waiting in the Wind" (James)
8. "Let It Go" (Callaghan, Graham Bidstrup)
9. "Trust" (Callaghan, James, Geoff Stapleton, Bidstrup, Chris Bailey)
10. "Camp of the Moon" (James)
11. "Pill for the Pain"

Additional backing vocals on Tracks 5, 6, 7, 8, and 9 were provided by original members Kayellen Bee and Marilyn Sommer (a.k.a. Marilyn Delaney).
