= Chronologica =

Compilation album by Gang Gajang
- Released: 2000
- Genre: Rock
- Label: Tronador

Gang Gajang chronology
The Essential (1996)	Chronologica (2000)	Oceans and Deserts (2002)

Chronologica is a double album by Gang Gajang, released only in Brazil in 2000 on Tronador Records (see 2000 in music).

The album, released to coincide with the band's 2000 tour of Brazil, featured tracks previously unavailable in Brazil spanning the band's career.

== Track listing ==
All songs written by Mark Callaghan unless otherwise indicated.

=== CD 1 ===
1. "Gimme Some Lovin" (Callaghan, Graham Bidstrup) - 2:47
2. "House of Cards" - 2:48
3. "Giver of Life" (Geoffrey Stapleton, Chris Bailey, Callaghan, G Bidstrup, Kayellen Bidstrup a.k.a. Kay Bee) - 3:40
4. "Sounds of Then (This is Australia)" - 3:56
5. "The Bigger They Are" - 3:29
6. "Ambulance Men" - 3:24
7. "Distraction" - 3:20
8. "Shadow of Your Love" (Bidstrup, Callaghan) - 3:07
9. "Maybe I" (Bidstrup, Callaghan) - 3:35
10. "To The North" (Bidstrup, Callaghan) - 2:47
11. "Initiation" (Callaghan, Bidstrup) 3:28
12. "In Spite of Love" (Stapleton)
13. "The Rise and the Rise of Reverend Bobby’s Buskers" (?)
14. "Sounds of Then (Mad Wax Mix)" – 3:24
15. "Initiation (Mad Wax Mix)" (Callaghan, Bidstrup) – 3:29

=== CD 2 ===
1. "American Money" (Stapleton) - 3:43
2. "Luck of the Irish" – 3:46
3. "Tree Of Love" – 4:18
4. "Roof Only Leaks (When It's Raining)" (G Bidstrup, Robert James, Callaghan, K Bidstrup)
5. "Thanks to Dave" (Bidstrup, Callaghan)
6. "Live And Learn"
7. "Fire of Genius" (K Bidstrup, G Bidstrup, Stapleton)
8. "Hundreds Of Languages" (Callaghan, James) – 3:36
9. "Talk To Me"
10. "Ordinary World" (Bidstrup, Callaghan, James) - 3:54
11. "Place And Time" (Bidstrup, Callaghan)
12. "Just Can't Help" (Callaghan, Bidstrup)
13. "Hellride" (Callaghan, Bidstrup, James, Bailey)
14. "Houses With Swimming Pools" (Callaghan, James)
15. "Nomadsland" (James)

(?) not found at APRA.
