= Shadow of Your Love (disambiguation) =

"Shadow of Your Love" is a song by Hollywood Rose later re-recorded by Guns N' Roses.

Shadow of Your Love may also refer to:

- "Shadow of Your Love", a song by Ganggajang from The Essential
- "Shadow of Your Love", a song by RAH Band from Mystery
- "Shadow of Your Love", a song by 69 Eyes from Angels
- "Shadow of Your Love", a song by The Temptations from Power

== See also ==
- "Shadows of Your Love", a song by J. M. Silk from Hold on to Your Dream
