= The Essential (Ganggajang album) =

Greatest hits album by GANGgajang
- Released: 14 February 1996
- Recorded: 1984–1993
- Genre: World
- Length: 65:33
- Label: Shock Records

GANGgajang chronology
Lingo (1994)	The Essential (1996)	Chronologica (2000)

The Essential is a greatest hits album released by GANGgajang in 1996. It features all the tracks from their 1985 self-titled debut and several songs from their other albums.

== Track listing ==
All songs written by Mark Callaghan unless otherwise indicated.

1. "Sounds of Then (This is Australia)" – 3:56
2. "Gimme Some Lovin" (Callaghan, Graham Bidstrup) – 2:47
3. "Hundreds Of Languages" (Callaghan, Robert James) – 3:36
4. "Ordinary World" (Bidstrup, Callaghan, James) – 3:54
5. "Giver of Life" (Geoffrey Stapleton, Chris Bailey, Callaghan, Bidstrup, Kayellen Bidstrup aka Kay Bee) – 3:40
6. "Distraction" – 3:20
7. "Talk to Me" – 4:02
8. "Initiation" (Callaghan, Bidstrup) – 3:28
9. "Maybe I" (Bidstrup, Callaghan) – 3:35
10. "American Money" (Stapleton) – 3:43
11. "Ambulance Men" – 3:24
12. "Tree of Love" – 4:18
13. "House of Cards" – 2:48
14. "To the North" (Bidstrup, Callaghan) – 2:47
15. "Initiation (Mad Wax Mix)" (Callaghan, Bidstrup) – 3:29
16. "Sounds of Then (Mad Wax Mix)" – 3:24
17. "The Bigger They Are" – 3:29
18. "Luck of the Irish" – 3:46
19. "Shadow of Your Love" (Bidstrup, Callaghan) – 3:07

== Charts ==
Chart (2004)	Peak position
Australia (ARIA Charts)	89
