= Into the Heat =

"Into The Heat"

Single by The Angels
- Released: February 1981
- Genre: Hard rock
- Length: 3.03
- Label: Epic
- Songwriter(s): Doc Neeson, John Brewster, Richard Brewster
- Producer(s): John Brewster, Richard Brewster

The Angels singles chronology
"Face the Day" (1980)	"Into The Heat" (1981)	"Night Attack" (1982)

"Into the Heat" is a song by Australian hard rock band the Angels, released in February 1981 as a non-album single. The song peaked at number 13 on the Kent Music Report.

== Track listing ==
EPIC ES 581

1. Into the Heat (Doc Neeson, John Brewster, Richard Brewster) - 3:03
2. Back On You (Neeson, J. Brewster, R. Brewster) - 3:02

== Personnel ==
- John Brewster - rhythm guitar, vocals
- Rick Brewster - lead guitar, vocals
- Doc Neeson - lead vocals
- Chris Bailey - bass, vocals
- Graham "Buzz" Bidstrup - drums

Production Team

- John Brewster, Richard Brewster - Producers (tracks: 1 & 2)

== Charts ==
Chart (1981)	Peak position
Australia (Kent Music Report)	14
