= Come On, People =

Come On, People may refer to:

- Come On, People (album), an album by Brother Henry
- "Come On People", an unreleased Lennon–McCartney song
- "Come On, People", a song by Achim Reichel from Die grüne Reise (The green journey)
- Come On, People: On the Path from Victims to Victors, a book by Bill Cosby and Alvin F. Poussaint
