= Poor Baby (song) =

Single by The Angels

from the album Dark Room
- Released: August 1980
- Genre: Hard rock
- Length: 4:03
- Label: Epic Records
- Songwriter(s): Doc Neeson, John Brewster, Rick Brewster
- Producer(s): Graham Bidstrup; John Brewster; Rick Brewster

The Angels singles chronology
"No Secrets" (1980)	"Poor Baby" (1980)	"Face the Day" (1980)

"Poor Baby" is a song by Australian hard rock group The Angels, released in August 1980 as the second single from their fourth studio album, Dark Room. The song peaked at number 72 on the Kent Music Report Singles Chart. The song was written by the Brewster Brothers, John and Rick Brewster.

== Track listing ==
EPIC ES482

1. Poor Baby (Doc Neeson, John Brewster, Rick Brewster) – 4:03
2. I'm Scared (Live) (Doc Neeson, John Brewster, Rick Brewster) – 4:28

== Personnel ==
- Doc Neeson - vocals
- Rick Brewster - lead guitar
- John Brewster - rhythm guitar
- Chris Bailey - bass guitar
- Graham "Buzz" Bidstrup - drums
- Dave Marett, Dave Cafe, Mark Opitz – engineer
- Graham Bidstrup* (tracks: 1), John Brewster, Rick Brewster – producer
- John Brewster, Doc Neeson, Rick Brewster - writers (tracks: 1 & 2)

== Charts ==
Chart (1980)	Peak position
Australia (Kent Music Report)	72
