= Talk the Talk =

Studio album by The Angels
- Released: 17 January 2014
- Genre: Hard rock
- Length: 49:54
- Label: Liberation
- Producer: Rick Brewster

The Angels chronology
Take It to the Streets (2012)	Talk the Talk (2014)	40 Years of Rock – Vol 1: 40 Greatest Studio Hits (2014)

Talk the Talk is the thirteenth studio album by Australian hard rock band, The Angels, released on 17 January 2014. It is the second album to have the Screaming Jets' lead singer, Dave Gleeson, on vocals. The album peaked at number 46 on the ARIA Albums Chart.

== Track listing ==
1. "Talk the Talk" (John Brewster, Marcus Ahern, Rick Brewster) 4:59
2. "Got an Itch" (Dave Gleeson, J. Brewster, R. Brewster) 3:22
3. "Every Man" (J. Brewster, Nick Norton) 5:35
4. "Broken Windows" (D. Gleeson, J. Brewster) 3:52
5. "Heart of Stone" (D. Gleeson, R. Brewster) 3:42
6. "Got a Feeling" (D. Gleeson, R. Brewster) 4:09
7. "Nations Are Falling" (J. Brewster, N. Norton, R. Brewster) 4:18
8. "You Might Make It" (Norton) 3:11
9. "Book of Law" (N. Norton, Sam Brewster) 3:32
10. "I Come in Peace" (R. Brewster, Ross Wilson) 4:12
11. "Personal Thing" (R. Brewster) 4:39
12. "No Rhyme nor Reason" (R. Brewster) 4:18

== Personnel ==
- Dave Gleeson – lead vocals
- Rick Brewster – lead guitar, vocals
- John Brewster – rhythm guitar, vocals
- Nick Norton – drums, vocals, lead vocals on "Book of Law"
- Sam Brewster – bass, lead guitar on "Book of Law"

Production

- Rick Brewster – producer

== Charts ==
Chart (2014)	Peak position
Australian Albums (ARIA)	46
