= Love Survives =

Love Survives may refer to:

- Love Survives (album), an album by Brother Henry
- "Love Survives" (song), a song from the 1989 film All Dogs Go to Heaven
- "Love Survive", a 2011 song by Scandal
