= Out of the Blue (EP) =

EP by The Angels
- Released: October 1979
- Recorded: 1979
- Studio: Albert Studios, Sydney
- Genre: Hard rock
- Length: 14:41
- Label: Alberts
- Producer: The Angels, Mark Opitz

The Angels chronology
No Exit (1979)	Out of the Blue (1979)	The Angels' Greatest (1980)

Out of the Blue is a four-track extended play by Australian hard rock band, the Angels, released in October 1979. "Out of the Blue" peaked at number 29 on the Kent Music Report Singles Chart.

The title track had already appeared on the Angels' third album, No Exit in June 1979.

== Track listing ==
1. "Out of the Blue" 3:17
2. "Mr. Damage" 3:36
3. "Save Me" 4:07
4. "Am I Ever Gonna See Your Face Again" 3:41

Bonus tracks

1. "Save Me" (Live at La Trobe University) 4:12
2. "Out of the Blue" (Live at La Trobe University) 3:56

== Personnel ==
- Doc Neeson – lead vocals
- Rick Brewster – lead guitar
- John Brewster – rhythm guitar
- Chris Bailey – bass guitar
- Graham "Buzz" Bidstrup – drums

Production

- Photography by – Desiree Field, Rod Birchill
- Producer – The Angels, Mark Opitz

== Charts ==
Chart (1979)	Peak position
Australian (Kent Music Report)	29
