= Take It to the Streets (The Angels album) =

Studio album by The Angels
- Released: 31 August 2012
- Genre: Hard rock
- Length: 57:01
- Label: Liberation Music
- Producer: John Brewster, Rick Brewster

The Angels chronology
Greatest Hits (2011)	Take It to the Streets (2012)	Talk the Talk (2014)

Singles from Take It to the Streets
- 1. "Waiting for the Sun" Released: 2012

Take It to the Streets is the twelfth studio album from The Angels released on 31 August 2012. It reached No. 24 on the ARIA Albums Chart.

== Track listing ==
1. "To the Streets" (John Brewster, Nick Norton) – 4:26
2. "Wounded Healer" (Rick Brewster) – 3:54
3. "Waiting for the Sun" (J. Brewster, R. Brewster, Joe Burnham) – 4:48
4. "Life Gets Better" (Dave Gleeson, R. Brewster) – 4:11
5. "Telephone" (R. Brewster, Colin Coplin) – 6:28
6. "No Sleep in Hell" (Doc Neeson, J. Brewster, R. Brewster) – 4:44
7. "The More You Know" (J. Brewster, C. Coplin) – 3:45
8. "When the Time Comes" (D. Neeson, J. Brewster, R. Brewster) – 3:03
9. "Pump It Up" (Elvis Costello) – 3:21
10. "There Comes a Time" (J. Brewster, C. Coplin) – 3:01
11. "Small Price" (J. Brewster, R. Brewster, Brent Eccles) – 4:02
12. "Getting Free" (R. Brewster, N. Norton) – 2:46
13. "Some Kinda Hell in Here" (R. Brewster, N. Norton) – 4:55
14. "Free Bird" (J. Brewster, N. Norton) – 3:37

"No Sleep in Hell" was originally on the album Watch the Red. "When the Time Comes" was originally on the album The Howling. "Small Price" was originally on the album Two Minute Warning.

== Personnel ==
- Bass, backing vocals – Chris Bailey
- Co-producer – John Brewster, Rick Brewster
- Drums, Backing Vocals – Nick Norton
- Guitar, harmonica, backing vocals – John Brewster
- Lead guitar, piano, organ – Rick Brewster
- Recorded by – Reyne House
- Vocals – Dave Gleeson

== Charts ==
Chart (2012)	Peak position
Australian Albums (ARIA)	24

== Notes ==
- Disc 1 - Additional guitar solos: Sam Brewster-Jones, Harry Brewster-Jones, Nick Norton
- Disc 1 - Recorded at Alberts Studio, Neutral Bay, NSW, Australia
- Disc 2 - Recorded live at QPAC Theater, Brisbane, Australia, 21 January 2012
- Produced by John and Rick Brewster
