= Never So Live =

EP by The Angels
- Released: October 1981
- Recorded: CBS Records Australia Limited
- Genre: Hard rock
- Length: 18:11
- Label: Epic

The Angels chronology
Dark Room (1980)	Never So Live (1981)	Night Attack (1981)

Never So Live is the third EP by Australian hard rock band the Angels, released in 1981. The EP peaked at number 17 on the Kent Music Report.

== Track listing ==
No.	Title	Writer(s)	Length
1.	"Fashion and Fame"	Doc Neeson, John Brewster, Richard Brewster	4:51
2.	"Talk About You"	Doc Neeson, Brent Eccles, Richard Brewster	3:43
3.	"Bad Dream"	Doc Neeson, John Brewster, Richard Brewster, Chris Bailey	4:29
4.	"Angel"	Doc Neeson, John Brewster, Richard Brewster	4:54

== Personnel ==
- John Brewster – rhythm guitar, vocals
- Rick Brewster – lead guitar, vocals
- Doc Neeson – lead vocals
- Chris Bailey – bass, vocals
- Brent Eccles – drums

== Charts ==
Chart (1981)	Peak position
Australian (Kent Music Report)	17
New Zealand	50
