= Dark Room (The Angels album) =

Studio album by The Angels
- Released: June 1980
- Recorded: 1980
- Studio: Paradise, EMI 301 and; Albert Studios, Sydney, Australia, Westlake Studios, Los Angeles
- Genre: Hard rock
- Length: 42:07
- Label: Epic
- Producer: John Brewster; Richard Brewster; Graham Bidstrup (track 1)

The Angels chronology
| The Angels' Greatest (1980) | Dark Room (1980) | Never So Live (1981) |

Singles from Dark Room
- 1. "No Secrets" Released: April 1980; 2. "Poor Baby" Released: August 1980; 3. "Face the Day" Released: October 1980

Dark Room is the fourth studio album by Australian band The Angels, released in June 1980. It was their first album for CBS/Epic and was co-produced by the group's John and Richard Brewster (brothers). It peaked at number five on the Kent Music Report Albums Chart. It reached number 37 on the New Zealand Albums Chart in July 1980.

In the Australasian market the album provided three singles, "No Secrets", "Poor Baby" and "Face the Day". "No Secrets" peaked at No. 8 on the Kent Music Report Singles Chart – their highest position to that time. The other two reached the top 100 in Australia. "Face the Day" appeared at No. 30 on the New Zealand Singles Chart.

For European and North American markets the album was issued as Darkroom in October 1980 under the name, Angel City, "to avoid confusion with the US glam metal band Angel." Two tracks, "Alexander" and "I'm Scared", were replaced by "Ivory Stairs" and "Straight Jacket". When the group toured the United States to promote this album they performed as Angel City. They released "No Secrets" as Angel City, late in 1980.

In June 2002 Shock Records issued four-disc box set The Complete Sessions 1980–1983 with remastered versions of Dark Room (nine bonus tracks), Night Attack (nine bonus tracks), Watch the Red (five bonus tracks) and The Blow (2× CD). In June 2006 Liberation Music re-issued Dark Room using the version from The Complete Sessions 1980–1983.

== Reception ==
Professional ratings
Review scores
| Source | Rating |
|---|---|
| Billboard | (unrated) |
| Collector's Guide to Heavy Metal | 10/10 |

== Track listings ==
Dark Room (June 1980) CBS/Epic (EPC 451066 2)

All tracks are written by Bernard Patrick Neeson, John Brewster-Jones and Richard Brewster-Jones, unless otherwise indicated

Side one
| No. | Title | Length |
|---|---|---|
| 1. | "No Secrets" (Graham Bidstrup, Neeson) | 4:18 |
| 2. | "Poor Baby" | 4:04 |
| 3. | "Wasted Sleepless Nights" / "Dark Room" (J. Brewster-Jones, Neeson, R. Brewster-Jones / Neeson, Bidstrup, J. Brewster-Jones, R. Brewster-Jones) | 6:09 |
| 4. | "Face the Day" | 6:10 |

Side two
| No. | Title | Length |
|---|---|---|
| 5. | "Night Comes Early" | 4:14 |
| 6. | "Alexander" | 3:29 |
| 7. | "The Moment" | 4:20 |
| 8. | "I'm Scared" | 3:49 |
| 9. | "Devil's Gate" | 5:32 |

All tracks are written by J. Brewster-Jones, Neeson and R. Brewster-Jones, unless otherwise indicated

Dark Room (2006) bonus tracks Liberation Blue (BLUE0542)
| No. | Title | Length |
|---|---|---|
| 10. | "Back on You" | 3:09 |
| 11. | "Alexander" (early take) | 3:45 |
| 12. | "Hot Shit" | 3:21 |
| 13. | "Hard Sell" | 3:45 |
| 14. | "Staring Voices" (Neeson, Bidstrup, J. Brewster-Jones, R. Brewster-Jones) | 2:42 |
| 15. | "I'm Scared" (live) | 4:28 |
| 16. | "Face the Day" (single edit) | 4:07 |
| 17. | "Public Enemy" (Chris Bailey, J. Brewster-Jones, Neeson, R. Brewster-Jones) | 2:57 |
| 18. | "Into the Heat" (Neeson, R Brewster-Jones) | 8:11 |

== Personnel ==
The Angels

- Doc Neeson – lead vocals
- Rick Brewster – lead guitar, piano, organ
- John Brewster – rhythm guitar, backing vocals
- Chris Bailey – bass guitar, backing vocals
- Graham "Buzz" Bidstrup – drums

Recording details

- Producer – Graham Bidstrup (track 1), J. Brewster (tracks 2–9), R. Brewster (tracks 2–9)
- Audio engineer – Dave Marett, Dave Cafe, Mark Opitz

Art works

- Cover – Timewinds
- Photography – Shoot and Run

== Charts ==
| Chart (1980) | Peak position |
|---|---|
| Australian Albums (Kent Music Report) | 5 |
| New Zealand Albums (RMNZ) | 37 |
| US Billboard 200 | 137 |

== Certifications and sales ==
| Region | Certification | Certified units/sales |
|---|---|---|
| Australia (ARIA) | Platinum | 50,000^{^} |
^{^} Shipments figures based on certification alone.
