= Gangagain =

Album by Gang Gajang

GangAGAIN

Studio album by GANGgajang
- Released: 18 September 1987
- Label: True Tone Records/Polygram Records

GANGgajang chronology
GANGgajang (1985)	GangAGAIN (1987)	True to the Tone (1990)

Singles from GangAGAIN
- 1. "Initiation" Released: 1986; 2. "American Money" Released: 27 July 1987; 3. "Luck of the Irish" Released: 1987

Gangagain (styled as gangAGAIN) is the second studio album recorded by Australian band GANGgajang. It was released in 1987 by True Tone Records and distributed by Polygram Records.

== Track listing ==
All songs by Mark Callaghan unless otherwise indicated.

1. "Tree of Love"
2. "Luck of the Irish"
3. "In Spite of Love" (Geoffrey Stapleton)
4. "Roof Only Leaks (When It's Raining)" (Graham Bidstrup, Robert James, Callaghan, Kayellen Bidstrup)
5. "Thanks to Dave" (G Bidstrup, Callaghan)
6. "American Money" (Stapleton)
7. "Live and Learn"
8. "Fire of Genius" (K Bidstrup, G Bidstrup, Stapleton)
9. "The Rise and the Rise of the Reverend Bobby's Buskers"
10. "Baby has Eyes for You " (James)

== Charts ==
Chart (1987)	Peak position
Australia (Kent Music Report)	51

== Personnel ==
=== Gang Gajang ===
- Mark Callagan — guitar, vocals; lead vocals (tracks 1, 2, 4, 5, 7, 9), tap shoes (track 9), spoons (track 9)
- Robert Nelson James — guitar, vocals; lead vocals (track 10)
- Geoffrey Stapleton — keyboards, guitar, vocals; lead vocals (tracks 3, 6, 8), harmonica (tracks 4, 7)
- Chris Bailey — bass
- Graham Bidstrup — drums, vocals; keyboards (tracks 1, 8), guitar (track 8), spoons (track 9)

=== Additional Personnel ===
- Wendy Matthews — backing vocals (tracks 1, 4, 7)
- Clive Hodson — alto saxophone (tracks 5, 9)
- Mark Dennison — alto saxophone (track 5), tenor saxophone (track 5, 9), clarinet (track 9)
- Peter Lothian — trumpet (track 5, 9)
- Kevin Dubber — trombone (track 5, 9)
- Andrew Leach — piano (track 5)
- Kayellen Bee — backing vocals (track 8)
- Marilyn Delaney — backing vocals (track 8)
