= Lingo (album) =

Studio album by GANGgajang
- Released: 22 April 1994
- Recorded: 1993
- Genre: Pop
- Label: rooArt/Warner
- Producer: GANGgajang, Rick Will

GANGgajang chronology
True to the Tone (1990)	Lingo (1994)	The Essential (1996)

Singles from Lingo
- 1. "Hundreds of Languages" Released: 1994; 2. "Ordinary World"/"Future Days" Released: 29 August 1994; 3. "Talk to Me" Released: 1995

Lingo is the third studio album recorded by Australian pop band GANGgajang. It was released in April 1994 on the rooArt label and distributed by Warner Music Australia. It was "recorded on a 24-track analogue and a 1969 EMI Abbey Road console," with the group co-producing alongside Rick Will. It peaked in the top 100 of the ARIA Albums Chart.

Chris Bailey, the group's bass guitarist and vocalist, described their motivation "The thing that drives the band, out of all the bands I've played with, is the fact it's still the best band to play with — just the music, the playability, everything." Naomi Mapstone of The Canberra Times opined "[it] is not really a new direction for the band, it's more a celebration of pop. There are no, pretensions here. For the most part, Lingo specialises in; rejoicing in the inane or day-to-day aspects of life."

== Track listing ==
All songs written by Mark Callaghan unless otherwise indicated.

1. "Hundreds of Languages" (Callaghan, Robert James)
2. "Ordinary World" (Graham Bidstrup, Callaghan, James)
3. "Talk to Me"
4. "The Way You Feel" (Bidstrup, Callaghan)
5. "Place and Time" (Bidstrup, Callaghan)
6. "24 Hours and Time"
7. "Hellride" (Callaghan, Bidstrup, James, Chris Bailey)
8. "Can't Stand Still" (James)
9. "Just Can't Help" (Callaghan, Bidstrup)
10. "Houses with Swimming Pools" (Callaghan, James)
11. "Give Peace Another Chance" (remix) (?)
12. "Funny Old Street" (remix) (Bidstrup, James, A James)
13. "Future Days"

== Charts ==
Chart (1994)	Peak position
Australia (ARIA Charts)	66
