= True Tone =

True Tone may refer to:

- True Tone Records (US label) — a 1950s record label based in New Orleans, Louisiana
- True Tone Records — An Australian record label established in the 1980s
- True Tone (iPhone) — a display technology in iPhone 8 and newer
- Truetone — a format medium used mainly for cellphone ringtones
