= Headband (band) =

Australian rock band

- Origin: Adelaide, South Australia, Australia
- Genres: progressive rock, psychedelic rock, blues, symphonic, country
- Years active: 1971–1974
- Labels: RCA, Polydor
- Past members: Chris Bailey; Joff Bateman; Peter Beagley; Mauri Berg
- Website: headbandofficial.com.au

Headband were a progressive, blues rock band formed in Adelaide in February 1971 by bass guitarist Chris Bailey; drummer Joff Bateman; singer-songwriter and keyboardist Peter Beagley (later known as Peter Head); and singer-songwriter and guitarist Mauri Berg. The group supported Elton John (in 1971), The Rolling Stones (in 1973) at their Sydney performances. The band finished third in the 1972 Hoadley's Battle of the Sounds – a national performance competition between the best groups representing each state. Headband released an album, A Song for Tooley (September 1973) and four singles before disbanding in 1974. Bailey later joined The Angels and then GANGgajang, Berg joined Fraternity (with Jimmy Barnes on vocals) and Head formed Mount Lofty Rangers (which included future AC/DC vocalist Bon Scott) and later went solo.

== History ==
Headband formed in February 1971 in Adelaide with Chris Bailey (ex-Red Angel Panic) on bass guitar, Joff Bateman (Resurrection, W.G. Berg, War Machine) on drums, Peter Head (Johnny Mac and the Macmen, Peter Beagley Trio, Boz) on keyboards and Mauri Berg (Silhouettes, Ides of March, Resurrection, W.G. Berg, War Machine) on guitar, harmonica and lead vocals. They were managed by Hamish Henry and his Grape Organisation who also managed rivals, Fraternity, with Bon Scott.

Headband played progressive blues rock with symphonic, country and pop influences. They had a strong work ethic, rehearsing and performing constantly, including three shows a week in high schools across Adelaide. "We did modern jazz at nightclubs, rock'n'roll for discos, J.S. Bach for pleasure, barbershop quartet stuff for laughs, electronic music at jam sessions, blues when feelin' low, and country and folk for interest. A combination of these influences comes out in our original material." explains Peter Head. The band practised "group indoctrination" in all types of music, even attending chamber music concerts together.

On 22 October 1971, they supported Elton John's Adelaide show at the Memorial Drive Tennis Centre. Their debut single, "Scratch My Back" was released locally by RCA and did not reach the charts. It was straight forward pop and was followed by their second single, "Land of Supercars", which was issued nationally in 1972. "Country Lady" was also released that year. In July, the band finished third in the 1972 Hoadley's Battle of the Sounds – a national performance competition between the best groups representing each state – having been a finalist in the previous year.

Headband supported The Rolling Stones on their Sydney performances in February 1973 and issued "A Song for Tooley" as their next single. Their debut album, A Song for Tooley, was released in September on Polydor. Its "sound was more adventurous ... [but it] was erratic, with the material ranging from Uriah Heep-styled heavy rock to psychedelic pop and progressive jazz". It featured Sydney Symphony players and a 110-piece children's choir. The album spent five weeks in the charts, making the Top 50. The album featured stunning hand drawn cover art by internationally renowned Adelaide artist Vytas Šerelis, and a fold-out poster with photos and biographical details of band members. Šerelis created promotional posters and photos for Headband, Fraternity, The Mount Lofty Rangers and Chequers.

Headband relocated to Sydney in 1973, they played the pub circuit with residencies including at Whisky a Go Go. They had toured Australia supporting international acts The Rolling Stones, Elton John and John Mayall. In 1974 they returned to Adelaide and disbanded.

== Afterwards ==
After Headband had separated, Bailey joined the Australian rock group The Angels in January 1977, he was later a founding member of GANGgajang. Berg joined a new line-up of Fraternity in late 1974, it included John Swan on drums and vocals, and his brother Jimmy Barnes (Cold Chisel) on vocals. By 1978, Bateman and Berg were together in Mickey Finn with half the members of Fraternity, who had returned demoralised from a miserable stint in London and had recently broken up. Head formed a loose musical collective, The Mount Lofty Rangers, in 1974, which began with various musicians from Fraternity and Headband. It included Bon Scott, who left to join AC/DC before year's end. The Mount Lofty Rangers spawned the musical Lofty produced by The Circle Theatre Company. By the early 1990s, the original vinyl pressing of A Song for Tooley became a collector's item for psychedelic and progressive rock fans.

Headband were inducted into the South Australian Music Hall Of Fame on April 1, 2016, at The Goodwood Institute, Adelaide, South Australia.

== Members ==
- Chris Bailey – bass guitar, backing vocals (1971–1974)
- Joff Bateman – drums, vocals, backing vocals (1971–1974)
- Peter Beagley (Peter Head) – keyboards (1971–1974)
- Mauri Berg – guitar, harmonica, lead vocals (1971–1974)

== Discography ==
=== Studio albums ===
List of albums, with selected chart positions
Title	Album details	Peak chart positions
Title	Album details	AUS
A Song for Tooley	Released: October 1973; Format: LP; Label: Polydor (2907 008)	44

=== Singles ===
List of singles, with selected chart positions
Year	Title	Peak chart positions	Album
Year	Title	AUS	Album
1972	"Scratch My Back" / "Musical Man"	-	non album single
1972	"Land of Supercars" / "Oh, How I Miss the Country"	80	Headband
1973	"Country Lady" / "Stay with Me"	48	Headband
1973	"A Song for Tooley" / "Brand New Morning"	-	Headband

== Awards ==
=== South Australian Music Awards ===
The South Australian Music Awards are annual awards that exist to recognise, promote and celebrate excellence in the South Australian contemporary music industry. They commenced in 2012. The South Australian Music Hall of Fame celebrates the careers of successful music industry personalities.

Year	Nominee / work	Award	Result	Ref.
2016	Headband	Hall of Fame	inductee	
