= Pierre Baroni =

Australian musician and broadcaster

- Born: 30 October 1955
- Died: 9 March 2021 (aged 65)
- Instrument(s): guitar, synthesizer

Pierre Baroni (30 October 1955 – 9 March 2021) was an Australian radio broadcaster, artist, and musician.

== Career ==
Pierre Baroni was born in Kew, Victoria in 1955, and grew up in Glenroy. He was a member of Melbourne pub band Carmine in the mid-1970s who were described by Ian "Molly" Meldrum as "one of the future top bands of Australia" on his Countdown tv program. After the band broke up, Baroni formed Power by Beat! (P.X.B.) in 1977, who released one EP in 1978.

In late 1980, Baroni joined New Wave band The Aliens, who had previously released singles and an album on Mushroom Records. After Baroni joined, The Aliens released their single I Don’t Care in 1981 and then broke up. During this time he began DJing his collection of 60s vinyl records at a Monday night called Shout, run by Rob Furst, owner of Beat Magazine, before joining his brother Dean Baroni in a new band Filed of Knives, who then became The Pony.

Formed in 1986, The Pony released two albums Thorns and Cutlery (1987) and Memories of Daydreams (1989) before breaking up in 1990.

Baroni then began working in the art department for Mushroom Records in 1990, designing record covers, and later directing music videos. After three months he was promoted to Art Director, and he created artwork for albums such as Archie Roach’s Charcoal Lane, and others for Tina Arena and Jimmy Barnes. His work for Mushroom was nominated and won ARIA Awards for Best Cover Art.

During the 90s, Baroni was a regular guest on Vince Peach's Soul Time radio program for Melbourne community radio station PBS. He then began presenting his own program Soulgroove’66 in 2003, sourcing records from his own collection of around 5,000 soul, funk and R&B singles.

In March 2021 he died from cancer, with PBS posting a series of tributes from his friends and listeners of his radio program. The theme song to Soulgroove’66 by Renée Geyer was released on vinyl as a tribute to Baroni following the news of his death. The recording featured Geyer and Baroni with organist Jake Mason, drummer Danny Farrugia, and bass player Yuri Pavlinov as the fictional band The New Cobras.

Pierre Baroni was inducted posthumously into Music Victoria’s Hall of Fame at the 2021 Music Victoria Awards, with tributes from Jimmy Barnes and Archie Roach.
