= The Bombers (band) =

Band

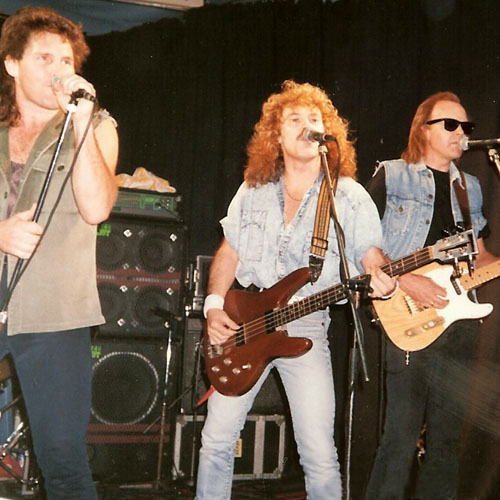
- Vocalist Tyrone Coates, bassist Alan Lancaster and guitarist John Brewster of The Bombers - Crows Nest Hotel, Sydney Australia - 13 December 1988

Background information
- Origin: Perth, Western Australia
- Years active: 1988–1990
- Labels: A&M Records
- Past members: Alan Lancaster, John Brewster, John Coghlan, Peter Heckenberg, Steve Crofts, Tyrone Coates

The Bombers were a short lived Australian rock band consisting of Alan Lancaster, John Brewster, John Coghlan, Peter Heckenberg, Steve Crofts, Tyrone Coates.

== Discography ==
=== Albums ===
List of albums, with Australian chart positions
Title	Album details	Peak chart positions
Title	Album details	AUS
Aim High	Released: April 1990; Format: CD, Cassette, LP; Label: A&M Records (395 292–2)	93
Live!	Released: September 2019; Format: CD, Digital LP; Label: Barrel and Squidger Records (NO. 617 SQ); Recorded live at Crows Nest Sydney, in May 1989	-

=== Singles ===
Year	Title	Chart positions	Album
Year	Title	AUS	Album
1989	"Running in the Shadows"	-	Aim High
1989	"World's On Fire"	93	Aim High
1990	"Flash in Japan"	-	Aim High
