= Face the Day (The Angels song) =

Single by The Angels

from the album Dark Room
- Released: October 1980
- Genre: Hard rock
- Length: 4:07 (single version); 5:21 (album version)
- Label: Epic Records
- Songwriter(s): Doc Neeson, John Brewster, Richard Brewster
- Producer(s): John Brewster, Richard Brewster

The Angels singles chronology
"Poor Baby" (1980)	"Face the Day" (1980)	"Into the Heat" (1981)

"Face the Day" is a song by Australian hard rock The Angels, released in October 1980 as the third and final single from their fourth studio album Dark Room. The single charted at number 30 on the Recorded Music NZ and number 67 on the Kent Music Report.

The song was covered by American hard rock band Great White on their 1986 album Shot In the Dark, and was the first single released from that album.

== Track listing ==
EPIC ES510

1. Face the Day (Doc Neeson, John Brewster, Richard Brewster) - 4:07
2. Public Enemy (Doc Neeson, John Brewster, Richard Brewster, Chris Bailey) - 2:58

== Personnel ==
- Doc Neeson - lead vocals
- Rick Brewster - lead guitar
- John Brewster - rhythm guitar
- Chris Bailey - bass guitar
- Graham "Buzz" Bidstrup - drums

Production

- Producer - John Brewster, Richard Brewster (tracks: 1 & 2)

== Charts ==
Chart (1980)	Peak position
Australia (Kent Music Report)	67
New Zealand (Recorded Music NZ)	20
