= The Riptides =

Australian power pop group

- Also known as: The Grudge; The Neon Steal; The Numbers
- Origin: Brisbane, Queensland, Australia
- Genres: Power pop; indie pop; Punk rock
- Years active: 1977–1983; 1987–1991; 2007
- Past members: Mark Callaghan; Dennis Cantwell; Scott Matheson; Allan Rielly; Tony Wheeler; Robert Vickers; Andrew Leitch; Michael Hiron; Graeme Hutchinson; Russell Parkhouse; Howard Shawcross; J.J.Harris; Graham Bidstrup; Tony Adams; Neil Chadwick
- Website: theriptides.com.au

The Riptides were an Australian power pop group which was formed in Brisbane, Queensland, in 1977 as The Grudge. Their founding mainstay was Mark Callaghan on lead vocals, bass guitar, rhythm guitar and as principal songwriter. Former member Michael Hiron died in 2001.

== History ==
=== 1977–1979: formation ===
The Riptides were formed in 1977 as the Grudge, their members were students at the Architecture Department, University of Queensland. The original line-up was Mark "Cal" Callaghan on lead vocals, Dennis Cantwell on drums, Scott Matheson on rhythm guitar, Allan Rielly on lead guitar and Tony Wheeler on bass guitar. Robert Vickers became the bass guitarist after Wheeler left the band in 1978 to pursue a career as a clarinettist and composer.

During 1978 the Grudge changed their name to the Neon Steal and then to the Numbers. In September 1978 the Numbers issued a limited edition (500 copies) three-track extended play, Sunset Strip, on the Go-Betweens' Able Label. Australian musicologist, Ian McFarlane, described it as "punchy and energetic and featured a brilliant, English-flavoured 1960s-inspired pop sound." Early in 1979 Vickers left the Numbers, travelling to New York City, where he joined the Colors. In 1983 he joined the Go-Betweens.

In 1979 Callaghan switched to bass guitar and the Numbers became the Riptides to avoid confusion with a Sydney band of that name. They remixed Sunset Strip's tracks and reissued it in July 1979 (2000 copies) via Able. Andrew Leitch then replaced Rielly on guitar and added keyboards.

=== 1980–1983: Peak and break up ===
The band issued a new single, "Tomorrow's Tears", in February 1980 on the Flat label. McFarlane felt it was "a fabulous slice of 1960s-styled R&B; pop." The band appeared on Australian Broadcasting Corporation's pop music TV show, Countdown, to promote the single. The Riptides moved to Sydney in mid-1980. In October they were signed to Regular Records.

Michael Hiron (ex-Leftovers, Flaming Hands, the Pineapples from the Dawn of Time) joined in March 1981 on bass guitar and Callaghan switched to rhythm guitar; Matheson also left. The four-piece line-up entered the studio with producer, Graham "Buzz" Bidstrup, (ex-the Angels) in mid-1981 to record a six-track mini-album Swept Away, which was released in November. From the album, a track, "Only Time", was issued as a single, also in November, while Cantwell and Leitch both left.

Callaghan and Hiron reformed the Riptides in early 1982 with new bandmates, Graeme "Hutch" Hutchinson on drums (ex-Leftovers, the Humans), Russell Parkhouse on keyboards and Howard Shawcross on bass guitar (ex-Last Chance Café, Elks); while Hiron moved to lead guitar. The group issued a new single, "Hearts and Flowers" in September, and supported Scottish group, Simple Minds, on their Australian tour in October.

By January 1983 the Riptides decided to disband: they had enough of performing. Callaghan recalled in December 2014, "There were other things that were going on in the band, you know, drugs, and I just thought nah, I've got to stop this, it's crazy. It had gone away from its original kind of vibe, anyway." In July 1983 Regular issued a compilation album, Riptides (a.k.a. The Last Wave), with the track list selected by Callaghan. Callaghan and Leitch had recorded a new track, "The Wedding Song", for the album.

McFarlane summarised the group's output "one of the classic Australian new wave groups. The band's blend of diamond-hard power pop, snappy surf melodies and whomping backbeat was irresistible and eminently danceable. After becoming one of the biggest drawcards on the Australian pub circuit during the early 1980s, The Riptides called it a day in 1983."

=== 1984–present: post break up ===
In 1984 Bidstrup on drums and Callaghan on guitar and lead vocals formed a pop rock group, GANGgajang in Sydney, with Chris Bailey on bass guitar (ex-the Angels). Leitch and Hiron formed a group, Catchcry, with Felix Davies on bass guitar, Ross Harley on guitar and vocals, and Tim Seckold on drums.

The Riptides had developed a cult status in Brisbane; they periodically reformed briefly for gigs at universities during Orientation Week. Early in 1987 Callaghan revived the Riptides for a reunion tour to celebrate ten years since formation. The line-up comprised Callaghan, Leitch, Hiron and Bidstrup on drums. The tour provided a double live album, Riptides Resurface, which came out in December. They toured again in February 1988 with Callaghan, Leitch and Hiron; while Bidstrup was replaced by J.J. Harris on drums (ex-Divinyls).

Callaghan, Harris and Hiron reformed the Riptides for tours during 1989 and 1990, with Brisbane's John Willsteed on guitar (ex-the Go Betweens). In early 1991 Callaghan, Harris and Hiron entered the studio with a new guitarist, Tony Adams and a session drummer, J. J. Hackett (ex-Mondo Rock). South African-born producer, Ricky Fataar (ex-Beach Boys drummer), recorded the group's first studio album, Wave Rock (August 1991). It provided two singles, "Stop (Don't Start)" (May 1991) and "Here Comes the Sun" (August). Neil Chadwick joined as a permanent drummer and the Riptides toured once again before disbanding at the end of that year.

In March 2001 Michael Hiron died suddenly. In July 2001 Callaghan played in a tribute gig for Hiron, in Brisbane, with other artists who had worked with the musician.

Bidstrup and Callaghan put together a new line-up of the Riptides for the Pig City Festival on 14 July 2007: adding Chris Bailey on bass guitar and Mark O'Connor on keyboards. They performed a classic set that showed why they still remain one of Brisbane's great bands. Rave Magazine's Sebastian Hayes, Simon Topper and James Stafford described how "Callaghan run, high-kick and grin around the stage is a bit like watching an over-enthusiastic Dad meeting your pals at a 21st – embarrassingly uncool, but completely endearing. Thankfully, the dancing and clapping crowd adore the five-piece's surf-rock."

During 2014 Callaghan supervised another compilation album, Tombs of Gold, which included unreleased material from the Swept Away sessions and four tracks from a later line-up.

== Members ==
- Mark Callaghan — lead vocals (1977- January 1983, Early 1987, February 1988, 1989, 1990, 1991, July 2007), bass (Early 1979-March 1981), rhythm guitar (Early 1981-January 1983, Early 1987, February 1988, 1989, 1990, 1991, July 2007)
- Dennis Cantwell — drums, backing vocals (1977-Mid 1981)
- Scott Matheson — rhythm guitar, backing vocals (1977-Early 1981)
- Allan Rielly — lead guitar, backing vocals (1977-Mid 1979)
- Tony Wheeler — bass (1977-Mid 1978)
- Robert Vickers — bass, backing vocals (Mid 1978-Early 1979)
- Andrew Leitch — lead guitar, backing vocals, keyboards (Mid 1979-Mid 1981, Early 1987, February 1988)
- Michael Hiron — bass, backing vocals (March 1981-Mid 1981, Early 1987, February 1988, 1989, 1990), lead guitar, backing vocals (Mid 1981-January 1983)
- Graeme Hutchinson — bass, backing vocals (Early 1982-January 1983)
- Russell Parkhouse — keyboards, backing vocals (Early 1982-January 1983)
- Howard Shawcross — drums (Early 1982-January 1983)
- Graham Bidstrup — drums (Early 1987, July 2007)
- J.J. Harris — drums (February 1988, 1989, 1990, Early 1991)
- John Willsteed — lead guitar (1989, 1990)
- Tony Adams — lead guitar, backing vocals (1991)
- Neil Chadwick — drums (Mid 1991-End 1991)
- Chris Bailey — bass (July 2007)
- Mark O'Connor — keyboards (July 2007)

== Discography ==
=== Studio albums ===
List of albums, with Australian chart positions
Title	Album details	Peak chart positions
Title	Album details	AUS
Swept Away	Released: 1981; Format: LP; Label: Regular Records (L20004)	-
The Riptides	Released: 1983; Format: LP, cassette; Label: Regular Records (RRLP 1207)	-
Wave Rock	Released: October 1991; Format: CD; Label: Bluedisc (510224-2)	125

=== Compilation albums ===
List of albums, with Australian chart positions
Title	Album details	Peak chart positions
Title	Album details	AUS
Resurface	Released: 1987; Format: 2xLP, Cassette; Label: Mercury (832 989-1)	56
Tombs of Gold	Released: 2014; Format: CD, download; Label: IS Music (ISM210401)	-

=== Singles ===
List of singles, with Australian chart positions
Year	Title	Peak chart positions	Album
Year	Title	AUS	Album
1978	"Sunset Strip"	-	non album single
1980	"Tomorrow's Tears"	-	Swept Away
1981	"Only Time"	89	The Riptides
1982	"Hearts and Flowers"	-	The Riptides
1991	"Stop (Don't Start)"	138	Wave Rock
1991	"Here Comes the Sun"	154	Wave Rock
