= Shadows of Your Love =

Song performed by J.M. Silk

Single by J.M. Silk featuring Steve "Silk" Hurley

from the album Hold on to Your Dream
- B-side: Remix; "Music Is the Key"
- Released: 1986
- Recorded: 1985
- Genre: Chicago house
- Length: 4:04
- Label: D.J. International Records; RCA Records; BCM Records; Rush Records
- Songwriters: Danny Wilson; Keith Nunnally; Peter Black
- Producers: Steve "Silk" Hurley; Rocky Jones

Steve "Silk" Hurley singles chronology
"Music Is the Key" (1985)	"Shadows of Your Love" (1986)	"I Can't Turn Around" (1986)

Alternative cover

"Shadows of Your Love" is a 1986 song performed by J.M. Silk featuring Steve "Silk" Hurley.

The composition was written by Danny Wilson, Keith Nunnally and Peter Black, and in addition released on the J.M. Silk's only album Hold on to Your Dream, issued in 1987 on RCA Records. The single charted at number three on US Dance chart.

== Credits and personnel ==
- Keith Nunnally - writer, lead vocal, back vocal
- Steve Hurley - back vocal, producer, mix,
- Lewis Bledsoe - back vocal
- Sampson "Butch" Moore - back vocal
- Danny Wilson - writer
- Peter Black - writer
- Larry Sturm - engineer
- Rocky Jones - executive producer
- Herbie Jr - mastering
- Bruce Forest - mix
- Farley "Jack Master" Funk - mix
- Glen Erler - photography

== Official versions ==
- "Shadows of Your Love (Album Version) - 4:04"
- "Shadows of Your Love (House Mix)"
- "Shadows of Your Love (Acappella/Beats Mix)"
- "Shadows of Your Love (Fierce Mix)"
- "Shadows of Your Love (Original Mix)"

== Charts ==
=== Weekly charts ===
Chart (1986)	Peak position
U.S. Billboard Hot Dance Music/Club Play	3
U.S. Billboard Hot Dance Music/Maxi-Singles Sales	40

== See also ==
- List of artists who reached number one on the US Dance chart
