= True Tone Records =

- Founded: 1985
- Founder: Michael Crawley
- Distributor(s): Polygram Records
- Genre: Various
- Country of origin: Australia

True Tone Records was an Australian based record label. It was founded by Michael Crawley in 1985. Crawley, an English expatriate, was the A&R Director for Polygram Records before establishing the label. The label was financially backed by Polygram, who distributed their releases however Polygram gave Crawley 'carte blanche' to sign and develop new acts.

== History ==
True Tone signed Gang Gajang and released the band's first single "Gimme Some Lovin'" in 1984, as well as their first two albums, Gang Gajang (1985) and Gang Again (1987). In 1985 the label signed The Go-Betweens but the band never recorded anything for True Tone and went on to sign with the UK label, Beggars Banquet Records. True Tone did however provide the Australian release of the Go-Between's fifth album, Liberty Belle and the Black Diamond Express (1986), as well as The Able Label Singles (1987).

True Tone also signed Rockmelons, releasing the band's first singles, "Time Out (For Serious Fun)" (1985), "Sweat It Out", and "Rhymes" (1987), as well as their debut album, Tales of the City (1988). When vocalist Peter Blakeley left the band he was signed by True Tone, which released his 1987 mini-album Vicious.

In 1986, the label signed Ed Kuepper (The Saints), releasing his second and third solo albums, Rooms Of The Magnificent (1986) and Everybody's Got To (1988).

Stephen Cummings then signed to the label in 1987, releasing the albums Lovetown (1988), A New Kind of Blue (1989), and Good Humour (1991).

After a three-year distribution arrangement with EMI, Crawley chose to take the label to another distributor, but EMI objected and took the label to court. Rather than see the label remain with EMI, Crawley sold off all its assets and closed the label. In 2013 Crawley established Vienna People Recordings, signing Melbourne-based rapper, L-Fresh the Lion.

== Artist roster ==
The label was responsible for releases by:

- Gang Gajang
- The Go-Betweens
- Rockmelons
- Ed Kuepper
- Peter Blakeley
- The Celibate Rifles
- Shooting School
- Steeltown
- Clive Young

== See also ==
- List of record labels
