= Ganggajang (album) =

GANGgajang

Studio album by GANGgajang
- Released: 22 November 1985
- Recorded: 1984−1985
- Label: True Tone Records/Polygram Records
- Producers: Joe Wissert; Graham 'Buzz' Bidstrup; Mark Callaghan

GANGgajang chronology
GANGgajang (1985)	GangAGAIN (1987)

Singles from GANGgajang
- 1. "Gimme Some Lovin'" Released: 1984; 2. "House of Cards" Released: 1985; 3. "Giver of Life" Released: 1985; 4. "The Bigger They Are" Released: 1985; 5. "Sounds of Then (This is Australia)" Released: November 1985

Ganggajang, stylised as GANGgajang, is the self-titled debut album from GANGgajang. It was released on True Tone Records through Polygram Records in 1985 and sold over 120,000 copies. It was produced by Joe Wissert, with band members Graham 'Buzz' Bidstrup and Mark Callaghan.

== Track listing ==
All songs written by Mark Callaghan unless otherwise indicated.

1. "Gimme Some Lovin'" (Callaghan, Graham Bidstrup) - 2:43
2. "Sounds of Then (This is Australia)" - 3:53
3. "Distraction" - 3:21
4. "Maybe I" (Bidstrup, Callaghan) - 3:35
5. "Ambulance Men" - 3:24
6. "The Bigger They Are" - 3:29
7. "Giver of Life" (Geoffrey Stapleton, Chris Bailey, Callaghan, Bidstrup, Kayellen Bidstrup aka Kay Bee) - 3:38
8. "Shadow of Your Love" (Bidstrup, Callaghan) - 3:05
9. "To The North" (Bidstrup, Callaghan) - 2:46
10. "House of Cards" - 2:45

Tracks from this album were also featured in the surf film Mad Wax.

== Personnel ==
Ganggajang

- Mark Callaghan — lead vocals, guitar
- Kaelyen Bee — backing vocals, percussion
- Geoffrey Stapleton — keyboards, percussion; didjeridoo (track 2)
- Chris Bailey — bass, backing vocals
- Graham "Buzz" Bidstrup — drums, backing vocals, percussion; acoustic guitar (track 6), guitar (track 7), keyboards (tracks 7, 9)

Additional musicians

- Marilyn Delaney — backing vocals (tracks 1, 4, 10)
- James Black — guitar (tracks 1-4), keyboards (track 1)
- Reg Mombassa — slide guitar (track 2)
- Col Loughnan — tenor saxophone (tracks 3, 8), clarinet (track 5)
- Brent Stanton — baritone saxophone (tracks 3, 8), clarinet (track 5)
- Peter Dilosa — trumpet (tracks 3, 5, 8)
- Robert James — acoustic guitar (track 4), guitar (tracks 5, 6, 9), banjo (track 5), backing vocals (track 9)
- Andrew Leitch — keyboards (track 4)
- George Brodbeck — trombone (tracks 5, 8)
- Gordon Sullivan — guitar (track 10)

== Charts ==
Chart (1985–1986)	Peak position
Australia (Kent Music Report)	27

== Certification ==
Region	Certification	Certified units/sales
Australia (ARIA)	Platinum	70,000^{^}
^{^} Shipments figures based on certification alone.

== Releases ==
Format	Country	Label	Catalogue No.	Year
LP	AUS	True Tone	826 349-2	1985
Cassette	AUS	True Tone/Mercury	826 349-4	1985
CD	AUS	True Tone/Mercury	826 349-1	1985
