= After the Rain (The Angels song) =

"After The Rain"

Single by The Angels

from the album Face to Face
- Released: 1978
- Genre: Hard rock
- Length: 2:59
- Label: Albert Productions
- Songwriter(s): Doc Neeson, John Brewster, Richard Brewster
- Producer(s): The Angels, Mark Opitz

The Angels singles chronology
"Straight Jacket" (1978)	"After The Rain" (1978)	"Shadow Boxer" (1979)

"After the Rain" is a song by Australian hard rock group the Angels, released in November 1978 as the fourth and final single from their second studio album Face to Face. "After the Rain" peaked at number 52 during a 21-week run.

== Track listing ==
AP 11823

1. After The Rain (Doc Neeson, John Brewster, Richard Brewster) - 2:59
2. Who Rings The Bell (Doc Neeson, John Brewster, Richard Brewster) - 2:50
3. Coming Down (Doc Neeson, John Brewster, Richard Brewster) - 3:19

== Personnel ==
- Doc Neeson – lead vocals
- Richard Brewster – lead guitar
- John Brewster – rhythm guitar
- Chris Bailey – bass guitar
- Graham "Buzz" Bidstrup – drums

Production team

- Engineer – Mark Opitz
- Producer – Mark Opitz, The Angels

== Charts ==
Chart (1978–1979)	Peak position
Australia (Kent Music Report)	52
