= No Secrets (The Angels song) =

Single by The Angels

from the album Dark Room
- Released: April 1980
- Genre: Hard rock
- Length: 4:17
- Label: Epic
- Songwriters: Graham "Buzz" Bidstrup, Doc Neeson
- Producers: John Brewster; Richard Brewster; Graham "Buzz" Bistrup

The Angels singles chronology
"Shadow Boxer" (1979)	"No Secrets" (1980)	"Poor Baby" (1980)

"No Secrets" is a song by Australian hard rock group, the Angels, released in April 1980 from their fourth studio album, Dark Room. "No Secrets" peaked at number 8 on the Kent Music Report Singles Chart. It was co-written by band members, Graham "Buzz" Bidstrup and Bernard "Doc" Neeson. In January 2018, as part of Triple M's "Ozzest 100", the most Australian songs of all time, "No Secrets" was ranked number 50.

== Background ==
The Angels released the single "No Secrets" in April 1980 ahead of their fourth studio album, Dark Room (June) via Epic Records. The album was produced by band members John Brewster (also on rhythm guitar and backing vocals) and Richard Brewster (also on lead guitar, piano and organ) with the rest of the line-up of Doc Neeson on lead vocals, Chris Bailey on bass guitar and backing vocals and Graham "Buzz" Bidstrup on drums. "No Secrets" was co-written by Bidstrup and Neeson. It peaked at number 8 on the Kent Music Report singles chart. In January 2018, as part of Triple M's "Ozzest 100", the most Australian songs of all time, "No Secrets" was ranked number 50.

== Track listing ==
Epic Records ES 417

1. "No Secrets" (Graham Bidstrup, Doc Neeson) - 4:17
2. "Staring Voices" (Doc Neeson, John Brewster, Rick Brewster, Graham Buzz" Bidstrup) - 2:39

== Personnel ==
- Doc Neeson - lead vocals
- Rick Brewster - lead guitar
- John Brewster - rhythm guitar
- Chris Bailey - bass guitar
- Graham "Buzz" Bidstrup - drums

== Charts ==
=== Weekly charts ===
Chart (1980)	Peak position
Australia (Kent Music Report)	8

=== Year-end charts ===
Chart (1980)	Position
Australia (Kent Music Report)	41
