= Ganggajang =

Australian pop rock band

GANGgajang
- Origin: Sydney, New South Wales, Australia
- Genre: Pop rock
- Years active: 1984–present
- Labels: Mercury, True Tone, RooART, Shock
- Members: Mark 'Cal' Callaghan; Graham "Buzz" Bidstrup; Geoffrey Stapleton; Robbie James; Peter Willersdorf
- Past members: Chris Bailey; Kayellen Bee; Marilyn Delaney; Gordon Sullivan; James Black; Mike Gubb; Mark O'Connor; Frank Corby; JJ Harris; Doug Bligh
- Website: www.ganggajang.com

Ganggajang, stylised as GANGgajang are an Australian pop rock band which formed in 1984.

The four founders are frontman Mark 'Cal' Callaghan (ex-Riptides) on guitar and lead vocals, Chris Bailey on bass guitar, Graham 'Buzz' Bidstrup on drums (both ex-The Angels) and Kayellen Bee vocals and percussion. They were soon joined by Geoffrey Stapleton (ex-the Aliens) on keyboards, guitar and vocals, and Robbie James on lead guitar.

Their most popular song, "Sounds of Then (This Is Australia)", was issued in December 1985 and peaked in the top 40 on the Australian Kent Music Report Singles Chart. It gained further exposure in Australia ten years later when it was used on TV in a Coca-Cola ad and then for the 1996 Nine Network station ID promotion. It was added to the National Film and Sound Archive of Australia's curated collection, Sounds of Australia, in 2016; and was the opening song for the 2024 Australia Day concert performed at Sydney Opera House and beamed live on ABC TV, performed by GANGgajang and William Barton.

Their highest selling album was GANGgajang, which was released in November 1985. They have issued three other studio albums, GangAGAIN (1987), Lingo (1994) and Oceans and Deserts (2002).

== History ==
=== Earlier bands ===
GANGgajang founders, Chris Bailey, Graham 'Buzz' Bidstrup, and Mark 'Cal' Callaghan had previously been members of various bands. Bailey, on bass guitar and vocals, had been a member of Adelaide groups, Tattered Sole and then Red Angel Panic, before forming progressive rockers Headband in 1971 with Peter Beagley (later known as Peter Head) on piano and vocals. In 1974 Bailey joined Mount Lofty Rangers alongside Bon Scott (later in AC/DC) on vocals and Head. In March 1975, Bailey released a solo single, "Sunday Too Far Away". Bidstrup had been the drummer in Fahrenheit 451 in 1967, then Red Angel Panic (with Bailey) and was in a succession of groups into the mid-1970s. In August 1976, Bidstrup joined Adelaide hard rockers, The Angels alongside lead vocalist Doc Neeson. In January 1977, Bailey also joined The Angels. Callaghan had formed The Grudge in 1977 in Brisbane with fellow students from the Architecture Department of the University of Queensland. The Grudge underwent a succession of names (The Neon Steal, The Numbers) to become The Riptides in 1979 with Callaghan on lead vocals and lead guitar. In March 1981 Bidstrup left The Angels and Bailey left in April 1982. In 1982 Bidstrup joined The Party Boys in Sydney. In January 1983, Riptides had disbanded and Callaghan was in Sydney. Bidstrup and Callaghan worked together on "Gimme Some Loving" and recorded it as a demo in 1983.

=== 1984–1987: Formation to gangAGAIN ===
In 1984, GANGgajang was formed in Sydney, the name is onomatopoeiac for the sound of a guitar playing a loud chord. The band grew out of songwriting and performing sessions that Bailey, Bidstrup, his wife Kayellen Bee and Callaghan undertook for the ABC-TV music-drama series Sweet and Sour (July–August 1984). They were soon joined by Geoffrey Stapleton (ex-The Aliens, Rat Tat Tat) on guitar and keyboards. Mercury Records released the earlier demo "Gimme Some Loving" as a single in May. It reached the top 40 on the Australian Kent Music Report Singles Chart by November.

To record their debut album, GANGgajang, they enlisted Gordon Sullivan (of Deckchairs Overboard, who had also worked on Sweet and Sour) on lead guitar; Kayellen Bee (a.k.a. Kay Bee), (who co-wrote "The Heart Plays Tricks" as K Bidstrup with G Bidstrup and Callaghan for Sweet and Sour) on vocals and percussion; and Marilyn Delaney on vocals and keyboards. The album was produced by Joe Wissert (Earth, Wind & Fire, Helen Reddy, The J. Geils Band) with band members Bidstrup and Callaghan. In August 1985 during the initial stages of recording the album, Robert James replaced Sullivan on guitar.

The group's live debut was at the Mosman Hotel in March 1985. The band gained a solid following around Australia during 1985, aided by support from national radio station, Triple J, and pop music TV series, Countdown. Their biggest commercial success came in November from the release of their self-titled debut album, which sold over 120,000 copies. The LP included the hit single, "Sounds of Then (This Is Australia)", as well as "House of Cards" and "Giver of Life". "Sounds of Then" was released in December and peaked in the top 40.

In 1986 GANGgajang members, Callaghan, James and Stapleton performed with The Rock Party, a charity project initiated by The National Campaign Against Drug Abuse, which included many Australasian musicians, Neil Finn, Eddie Rayner, Tim Finn, Nick Seymour and Paul Hester (all from Crowded House); Andrew Barnum and Lissa Barnum (Vitabeats); Deborah Conway (Do-Re-Mi); Mary Azzopardi (Rockmelons), Michael Barclay, Peter Blakeley, Jenny Morris, Danny De Costa, Greg Herbert (The Promise), Spencer P Jones, Sean Kelly (Models), John Kennedy, Paul Kelly, Robert Susz (Dynamic Hepnotics) and Rick Swinn (The Venetians). The Rock Party released a 12" single "Everything to Live For", which was produced by Wissert, Phil Rigger and Phil Beazley. In 1987, GANGgajang's music was featured exclusively in the Quiksilver surf movie Mad Wax: The Surf Movie. The film became a cult surf classic and introduced the band to a worldwide audience: GANGgajang was named 'World's Best Band' two years in a row by the Association of Surfing Professionals.

The group released their second album, gangAGAIN, in 1987, after which various members pursued solo projects although the band continued performing irregularly. Kayellen Bee left the band in mid 1987 and over the next six years Callaghan released a solo album, reformed the Riptides, then released a live album Resurface and a studio album Wave Rock. He worked as an executive for the now-defunct Festival Records group. Bidstrup played sessions, produced albums and movie soundtracks. Bailey worked with various artists: Jimmy Barnes, Alannah Miles and Nathan Cavaleri. Stapleton toured Australia and Europe with Absent Friends and then went on to form The Dukes with Sean Kelly. James wrote a book, The Second Best Book of Disunderstandabilism and then recorded his songs with Wendy Matthews.

=== 1993–1996: Lingo to "Sounds of Then" ===
In 1993 GANGgajang reconvened and recorded their third album, Lingo, without Bee and Delaney – both had gone on to careers in the film industry. GANGgajang were joined by Mark O'Connor on keyboards. O'Connor left soon after and was replaced by Mike Gubb on keyboards. The album was released in May 1994 on RooART and spawned three singles, "Hundreds of Languages", "Talk to Me", and "Ordinary World"/"Future Days".

In 1995, the first two albums were repackaged into The Essential (aka The Essential GANGgajang). In September–October the band toured Brazil for the first time. While in Rio de Janeiro they appeared on Brazilian TV's The Seu Boneco Show and met local comedy rock band, Mamonas Assassinas. Ten years after its release, "Sounds of Then" became better known to Australians when it was used for a Coca-Cola commercial. In 1996, the Nine Network used it on its station ID promotion. The group returned to Brazil for their second tour.

=== 2000s ===
GANGgajang played the Sydney Opera House and Darling Harbour as part of the Corroboree 2000 celebrations and during the 2000 Summer Olympics the band was in demand for concert appearances around Sydney as part of the Olympic Arts Festival. In February 2001 the group completed its third tour of Brazil.

In October 2002 they released their fourth studio album, Oceans and Deserts, produced by guitarist Robbie James, which spawned the singles "Nomadsland", "Anodyne Dream" and "Trust", to critical acclaim and extensive airplay across Australia on ABC radio. Five tracks featured backing vocals from original members Kayellen Bee and Marilyn Delaney (aka Marilyn Sommer).

In 2004 a live concert featuring a selection of new songs and some of the classics was filmed for the ABC's Live at the Basement series. Late in 2006, their double DVD, The Complete GANGgajang was issued. It featured music video clips, live performances, interviews, and a documentary of their first tour of Brazil.

When not performing or recording together as GANGgajang each band member is involved in other projects: Callaghan was General Manager of Shock Music Publishing (2002–2007); in May 2007 he was appointed GM of Australian Music Publishing Association Limited (AMPAL). As of 2010, he was writing songs for GANGgajang's next album - due to begin recording early that year. Bidstrup managed Australian music personality, Jimmy Little, since the release of Little's 1999 ARIA Award-winning CD The Messenger, and is CEO of Uncle Jimmy Thumbs Up LTD, a charity whose primary aim is to provide health and nutrition education to young Indigenous Australians. He has also played on and off at times with various formations of The Angels.

Bailey worked in a variety of music cultures in Sydney and produced an album for singer-songwriter, Dave Debs. Bailey also played in Little's live band and with The Angels from 2002 to 2012. He died on 4 April 2013 after battling cancer.

James has released three solo albums Suzannah Suite (1999) and Secrets in the Sand (2006) and 24 Hours A Night (2022). He was also a member of Yothu Yindi from 2001 when they toured Brazil with GANGgajang until the end of 2005.

Stapleton resides in Adelaide and prepared his painting exhibition, called "Oceans and Deserts". He made several film clips for the band and for others, whilst maintaining and developing the band's website and writing new songs.

GANGgajang have a following outside Australia and are especially popular in Brazil following their Mad Wax: The Surf Movie soundtrack and three tours. In 2011, Jeff Harris (ex-Divinyls) joined on drums while Bidstrup was unavailable while working for the Jimmy Little Foundation, but founding member Bidstrup soon became available again and has appeared with the band subsequently. In April 2011 the group performed at the 50th anniversary of the Bells Beach Surf Classic.

== Group members ==
- Mark 'Cal' Callaghan – guitar, vocals (1984–present)
- Chris Bailey – bass, vocals (1984–2013; died 2013)
- Graham "Buzz" Bidstrup – drums, percussion, guitar, keyboards, vocals (1984–1996, 1997–2010, 2013–present)
- Geoffrey Stapleton – keyboards, guitar, vocals (1984–1992), (1995–present)
- Robbie James – guitar, vocals (1985–present)
- Peter Willersdorf – bass (2014–present)
- Kayellen Bee – backing vocals (1984–1987)
- Marilyn Delaney – backing vocals (1984–1985)
- James Black – guitar, keyboards (1984)
- Gordon Sullivan – guitar (1984–1985)
- Mark O'Connor – keyboards (1993)
- Mike Gubb – keyboards (1993–1995)
- Frank Corby – drums (1996-1997)
- Jeff Harris – drums (2011–2012)
- Doug Bligh – drums (2012–2013)

== Discography ==
GANGgajang discography
- Studio albums: 4
- Compilation albums: 3
- Singles: 15
- Video albums: 1

=== Studio albums ===
Title	Album details	Peak chart positions	Certifications (sales thresholds)
Title	Album details	AUS	Certifications (sales thresholds)
GANGgajang	Released: November 1985; Label: True Tone Records (826349-1, 826 349-4) Mercury Records; Format: LP, cassette	27	ARIA: Platinum
gangAGAIN	Released: October 1987; Label: True Tone, Mercury (832 586-1, 832 586-2); Format: LP, CD	51	
Lingo	Released: 12 February 1994; Label: rooArt (4509956532); Format: CD	66	
Oceans and Deserts	Released: 14 October 2002; Label: Press Play Music/Shock Records (GANG 02); Format: CD	—	
"—" denotes album that did not chart or was not released in that country.

=== Soundtrack albums ===
Title	Album details
Mad Wax: The Surf Movie	Released: 1987; Label: Format: LP, CS

=== Compilation albums ===
Title	Album details	Peak chart positions
Title	Album details	AUS
True to the Tone	Released: 1990; Label: True Tone Records, Mercury Records (846 704-1, 846 704-2); Format: CD	—
The Essential	Released: 22 January 1996; Label: Press Play Music/Shock Records (GANG 96); Format: CD	89
Chronologica	Released: 2000; Label: Tronador Records (TMSS07); Format: CD	—
"—" denotes album that did not chart.

=== Singles ===
Year	Title	Peak chart positions	Album
Year	Title	ARIA	Album
1984	"Gimme Some Loving"	46	GANGgajang
1985	"House of Cards"	45	GANGgajang
1985	"Giver of Life"	48	GANGgajang
1985	"Dream at Night"	—	Emoh Ruo (soundtrack)
1985	"Sounds of Then (This Is Australia)"	35	GANGgajang
1986	"The Bigger They Are"	60	GANGgajang
1987	"Initiation"	69	gangAGAIN
1987	"American Money"	87	gangAGAIN
1987	"Tree of Love/Luck of the Irish"	—	gangAGAIN
1993	"Hundreds of Languages"	62	Lingo
1994	"Talk to Me"	88	Lingo
1994	"Ordinary World/Future Days"	—	Lingo
2000	"Nomadsland"	86	Chronologica/Oceans and Deserts
2003	"Anodyne Dream"	—	Oceans and Deserts
2003	"Trust"	—	Oceans and Deserts
2018	"Surfing Round the World"	—	non-album singles
2018	"Not Waiting Around"	—	non-album singles
2021	"Circles in the Sand"	—	non-album singles
2021	"Australian Medley"	—	non-album singles
2023	"Speak to Me" (with Jack Thompson and William Barton)	—	non-album singles
"—" denotes a recording that did not chart or was not released in that territory.
