= Comin' Down (The Angels song) =

Single by The Angels

from the album Face to Face
- Released: March 1978
- Recorded: Albert Studios
- Genre: Hard rock
- Length: 2:59
- Label: Albert Productions
- Songwriters: Doc Neeson, John Brewster, Rick Brewster
- Producers: Harry Vanda; George Young

The Angels singles chronology
"You're a Lady Now" (1977)	"Comin' Down" (1978)	"Take a Long Line" (1978)

"Comin' Down" is a song by Australian hard rock band The Angels, released in March 1978 as the lead single from the band's second studio album, Face to Face. The song first peaked at number 80 on the Australian Kent Music Report. It was co-written by band members, Doc Neeson, John Brewster and Rick Brewster.

== Track listing ==
AP 11685
No.	Title	Writer(s)	Length
1.	"Coming Down"	Doc Neeson, John Brewster, Rick Brewster	2:59
2.	"Live It Up"	Doc Neeson, John Brewster, Rick Brewster	2:20

== Personnel ==
- Doc Neeson – lead vocals
- Rick Brewster – lead guitar
- John Brewster – rhythm guitar
- Chris Bailey – bass guitar
- Graham "Buzz" Bidstrup – drums

production team

- Engineer – Mark Opitz
- Producer – Vanda & Young

== Charts ==
Chart (1978)	Peak position
Australia (Kent Music Report)	80
