= Sounds of Then =

Single by GANGgajang

from the album GANGgajang
- B-side: "House of Cards"
- Released: November 1985
- Recorded: 1984–85
- Studio: Rhinoceros
- Genre: Rock
- Length: 3:57
- Label: True Tone; Polygram; Shock
- Songwriter(s): Mark Callaghan
- Producer(s): Joe Wissert; Graham Bidstrup; Mark Callaghan

GANGgajang singles chronology
| "Dream at Night" (1985) | "Sounds of Then" (1985) | "The Bigger They Are" (1986) |

"Sounds of Then (This Is Australia)" is a 1985 song by Australian rock band, GANGgajang, from their self-titled debut album, GANGgajang. "Sounds of Then" was written by front man, Mark "Cal" Callaghan, who provides lead vocals and guitar. He co-produced the album with fellow band member, Graham Bidstrup, and Joe Wissert (Earth, Wind & Fire, Helen Reddy, the J. Geils Band) at Rhinoceros Studios.

It was issued as a single in November 1985 and peaked at No. 35 on the Kent Music Report Singles Chart in February 1986. "Sounds of Then" became the band's most popular and recognisable song, and was used as Nine Network's station ID promotion in 1996. The B-Side, "House of Cards", had been recorded live for youth radio station, 2JJJ.

It has been described as, "a defining portrait of the nation."

== Composition ==
Callaghan recalled that it started as a poem in his notebook, reflecting on the time that his family moved from England to Bundaberg in Queensland, a major culture shock for him:

"We lived half way between Bundaberg and the ocean, all around was bush scrub and cane fields. And walking up to the top of the street to catch the school bus, one morning you turn around and there's fire. It's one of those songs where if your goal was only to sell records, whatever it took to do it, then the song would have been called 'This is Australia'. But it's not about that. It's a brick veneer drama. My parents got divorced when they came to Australia, it was a horrible period of my life. And the song is actually about how smells and sounds and sensations can rekindle a memory – which is what music does so successfully for people: 'I think I hear the sounds of then and people talking / Scenes recalled by minute movement / And songs they fall from the backing tape…'."

== Track listing ==
=== 1985 single ===
All songs written by Mark Callaghan unless otherwise indicated.

1. "Sounds of Then" – 3:57
2. "House of Cards" (live version)

=== 1996 re-release ===
1. "Sounds of Then" aka "This Is Australia" – 3:57
2. "Giver of Life" (Geoffrey Stapleton, Chris Bailey, Callaghan, Graham Bidstrup, K Bidstrup aka Kay Bee)– 3:39
3. "Sounds of Then" (Surf mix) – 3:23

== In popular culture ==
The song was used in a Coca-Cola ad and in the 1987 feature film, North Shore. In the 2015 TV documentary-drama Australia: The Story of Us, a snippet from the chorus is frequently played.

An instrumental version sub-titled variously as: "Sounds of Then" (Instrumental) or (Surf mix) or (Mad Wax mix) had been used in the Quiksilver-sponsored cult surf film, Mad Wax (1984), for which Bidstrup was the musical director. The instrumental was later released as the B-side of their 1986 single, "Initiation". It was also added to the 1996 re-release of the main single (listed below) with an additional B-Side "Giver of Life".

In 2016 the song was one of ten new tracks added to the National Film and Sound Archive's Sounds of Australia collection.

In January 2018, as part of Triple M's "Ozzest 100", the 'most Australian' songs of all time, "Sounds of Then" was ranked number 7.

Adam Brand and the Outlaws covered the song on the 2016 album Adam Brand and the Outlaws. Sarah Blasko covered the song in 2021 in a release as a single. Her rendition did not chart, but gained national exposure in Australia by being used in a television advertisement for Colorbond steel.

== Charts ==
| Chart (1986) | Peak position |
|---|---|
| Australia (Kent Music Report) | 35 |
