= Take a Long Line =

Single by The Angels

from the album Face to Face
- Released: July 1978
- Recorded: Albert Studios
- Genre: Hard rock
- Length: 3:00
- Label: Albert Productions
- Songwriters: Doc Neeson, John Brewster, Rick Brewster
- Producers: The Angels, Mark Opitz

The Angels singles chronology
"Comin' Down" (1978)	"Take a Long Line" (1978)	"Straight Jacket'" (1978)

"Take a Long Line" is a song by Australian hard rock group the Angels, released in July 1978 as the second single from their second album, Face to Face. The song peaked at number 29 on the Australian Kent Music Report.

In January 2018, as part of Triple M's "Ozzest 100", the 'most Australian' songs of all time, "Take a Long Line" was ranked number 35.

The song was largely written by band member Rick Brewster. In a 2018 interview with his brother and fellow band mate, John Brewster, on ABC Radio 774 in Melbourne, he said that many of the lyrics in the song were inspired by characters his brother had encountered on the streets of Kings Cross in Sydney.

The year of its release (1978), The Angels supported both Meat Loaf and David Bowie on their respective tours of Australia. David Bowie actually asked the band to support him on his tour after hearing the Face to Face album and seeing The Angels live at a show at the Bondi Lifesaver club.

== Track listing ==
AP 11759

1. "Take a Long Line" (Doc Neeson, John Brewster, Rick Brewster) – 3:00
2. "Love Takes Care" (Doc Neeson, John Brewster, Rick Brewster) – 3:34

== Personnel ==
- Doc Neeson – lead vocals
- Richard Brewster – lead guitar
- John Brewster – rhythm guitar
- Chris Bailey – bass guitar
- Graham "Buzz" Bidstrup – Drums
- The Angels, Mark Opitz – Producer

== Charts ==
Chart (1978)	Peak position
Australia (Kent Music Report)	29
