= The Aliens (Australian band) =

Australian new wave band

- Origin: Melbourne, Victoria, Australia
- Genres: New wave
- Years active: 1978–1981
- Labels: Mushroom/Festival, Planet X/EMI
- Past members: see Members list below

The Aliens were an Australian new wave band which formed in April 1978. They were one of the first local bands of the late 1970s to adopt a "uniform" of "black clothes and skinny, white ties". Two of their singles, "Confrontation" and "Follow that Girl", appeared on the Kent Music Report Singles Chart top 50. Australian musicologist, Ian McFarlane, noted their "sound embraced guitar-oriented pop rock with the emphasis on 1960s melodies".

== History ==
Three of the founders of the Aliens, Danny Johnson on lead vocals, Geoff Stapleton on guitar and vocals and Greg Webster on lead guitar, were in an Adelaide band, Gold, at that time Stapleton was on drums. In 1975 the line-up of Gold also included Grant Lang on keyboards, Dave Lewis on lead guitar and Grant Lewis on bass guitar. They played local venues around the city, as well as a number of country performances. In 1976 Gold were winners of the 5KA 'Battle of the Bands'. Soon after they were renamed as Riff Raff, which had a more punk name which reflected their material.

In 1977 the Riff Raff line-up were Johnson, Stapleton (now on guitar), and Webster (now on guitar and vocals), together with Rob Grosser on drums. In February 1978 Johnson, Stapleton and Webster moved to Melbourne and in April that year they formed the Aliens with Graham Lewis on keyboards and Kevin Patricks on drums. They were one of the first local bands of the late 1970s to adopt a new wave "uniform" of "black clothes and skinny, white ties".

In June 1979 the Aliens signed with Mushroom Records and recorded their first single, "Confrontation", with producer Charles Fisher over a weekend, from 11 to 13 August 1979, at Trafalgar Studios, Sydney. The group were mid-tour supporting The Sports nationally. In December "Confrontation" reached No. 36 on the Australian Kent Music Report Singles Chart.

Their debut album, Translator, was recorded at The Music Farm, in northern New South Wales, between 24 November and 9 December 1979, with David Tickle producing. The band performed on TV shows: Countdown, Nightmoves, Sounds Unlimited, and Hey Hey Its Saturday. In January 1980 the band toured nationally supporting United Kingdom band, Squeeze, and in March they supported The Police. The band had released its second single, "Follow that Girl", on 25 February that year, which reached No. 48.

On 20 May 1980 following a performance at the Canberra Theatre, Webster quit and returned to Melbourne. In the previous sixteen-month period they had played 356 shows around Australia. The band continued as a three-piece, working in a whole new repertoire and sound, which included keyboards from Stapleton. In September Randy Bulpin from Mondo Rock briefly joined on lead guitar until the end of October when the band relocated to Sydney.

Pierre Baroni joined the band on the day they left Melbourne for Sydney. He was recruited for his voice and song writing ability, as well as his guitar arrangements. On 27 November Grosser left and was replaced by Alex Bash on drums in December 1980. On 6 March 1981 Johnson left the group leaving Stapleton as the only original member. Greg Trennery joined on bass guitar on 31 March. The new line up of Stapleton, Baroni, Bash and Trennery recorded a third single, "I Don't Care", on 23 May at EMI Studios 301.

"I Don't Care" featured Stapleton on lead vocals and the B-side "Over my Head" had Baroni on lead vocals. It was released in December 1981 on their own label, Planet X Records, through EMI. On 29 May Bash left the band and was replaced by Malcolm Fogg on 3 June. They toured Melbourne during October and November that year. Bash rejoined the band, replacing Fogg for the band's last performance on the TV show, Countdown, on 11 December 1981, performing "I Don't Care". Australian musicologist, Ian McFarlane, noted their "sound embraced guitar-oriented pop rock with the emphasis on 1960s melodies".

Stapleton later joined a range of groups: Rockmelons (1983–85), GANGgajang (1984–87, 1995–present), Absent Friends (1990) and The Dukes (1991–93). Baroni worked in the art department of Mushroom Records.

== Members ==
- Geoffrey Stapleton – rhythm guitar, backing and lead vocals, keyboards (April 1978-80); guitars, backing and lead vocals, keyboards (1980); lead vocals, rhythm guitar, keyboards (1980-1)
- Greg Webster – lead guitar, backing vocals (April 1978 - May 1980)
- Graham Lewis – keyboards (April 1978 - End 1979)
- Danny Johnson – bass, lead vocals (April 1978-81)
- Kevin Patricks – drums (April 1978 - End 1979)
- Rob Grosser – drums (1979-80)
- Alex Bash – drums (1980-1)
- Malcolm Fogg – drums (1981)
- Randy Bulpin – lead guitar (1980)
- Pierre Baroni – lead guitar, backing and lead vocals, keyboards (1980-1)
- Greg Trennery – bass (1981)

== Discography ==
=== Albums ===
- Translator – Mushroom Records (1980)

=== Singles ===
- "Confrontation"/"Boys in Black" – Mushroom Records (December 1979) AUS No. 36
- "Follow That Girl"/"The Hyding of Dr Jekyll" – Mushroom (February 1980) AUS No. 48
- "I Don't Care"/"Over My Head" – Planet X (December 1981)
