= Richard Brewster =

Australia musical artist - lead guitarist of The Angels

- Born: Richard Brewster-Jones; 1952 or 1953 (age 73–74); Adelaide, South Australia, Australia
- Genres: Rock
- Occupations: Musician, songwriter, guitarist, singer
- Years active: 1970–present

Richard Brewster-Jones (born 1952 or 1953), who performs as Rick Brewster, is an Australian guitarist who has played in a number of Australian rock bands, including the Angels (1974–2000, 2008–present). That group were inducted into the ARIA Hall of Fame in 1998. As a songwriter Brewster was inducted into the Australian Songwriters Hall of Fame in 2008.

== Biography ==
Richard Brewster-Jones, was born in 1952 or 1953, in Adelaide as the younger brother of John (born 1949). Their father Arthur (born 1916) and grandfather Hooper Brewster-Jones (1887–1949) were classical musicians. Brewster attended St Peter's College for secondary education. In 1970, as Rick Brewster, with his brother and Bernard Neeson on lead vocals (p.k.a. Doc Talbot, later Doc Neeson), he formed an acoustic covers band Moonshine Jug & String Band. For that group he provided violin, washboard, jug, guitar, backing vocals and percussion. They released a four-track extended play Keep You on the Move (1973) via Sphere Organization, which was popular in Adelaide. John Woodruff was their manager and the label's owner.

Moonshine Jug & String Band evolved into the Keystone Angels, a rock band, with Brewster on lead guitar, in 1974. According to Australian musicologist Ian McFarlane they were "playing 1950s rock'n'roll/R&B material on the pub circuit." An appearance at the 1975 Sunbury Pop Festival in January, resulted in a tour supporting AC/DC and then working as Chuck Berry's backing band. The Keystone Angels issued a single, "Keep On Dancin'/Good Day Rock and Roll" (1975). By the end of that year they became the Angels. Other members have included Chris Bailey on bass guitar and Brent Eccles on drums. At the ARIA Music Awards of 1998 the Angels line-up of the Brewster brothers, Bailey, Eccles and Neeson were inducted in the ARIA Hall of Fame alongside the Masters Apprentices.

As a songwriter Brewster has co-written the Angels' top 20 original singles, "Into the Heat (1981)", "Am I Ever Gonna See Your Face Again" (live, 1988), "Let the Night Roll On" and "Dogs Are Talking" (both 1990). Brewster was inducted into the Australian Songwriters Hall of Fame by ASAI (Australian Songwriters Association Incorporated). Over the history of the band from 1974 to 2000 (when the Angels disbanded) and since 2008 (they reformed), Brewster is the only mainstay – his brother had left in 1986 to join the Party Boys but returned in 1992. As from December 2022 Brewster is still a member of the Angels and when not touring with the band he works on side-projects with his brother.

== Awards and nominations ==
=== Australian Songwriter's Hall of Fame ===
The Australian Songwriters Hall of Fame was established in 2004 to honour the lifetime achievements of some of Australia's greatest songwriters.

Year	Nominee / work	Award	Result
2008	himself	Australian Songwriter's Hall of Fame	inducted

=== SA Music Hall of Fame ===
Rick was inducted into the SA Music Hall Of fame on 16 May 2014 alongside his brother John, Redgum's John Schumann and Rose Tattoo's Rockin' Rob Riley.
