= Dave Gleeson =

Australian musician

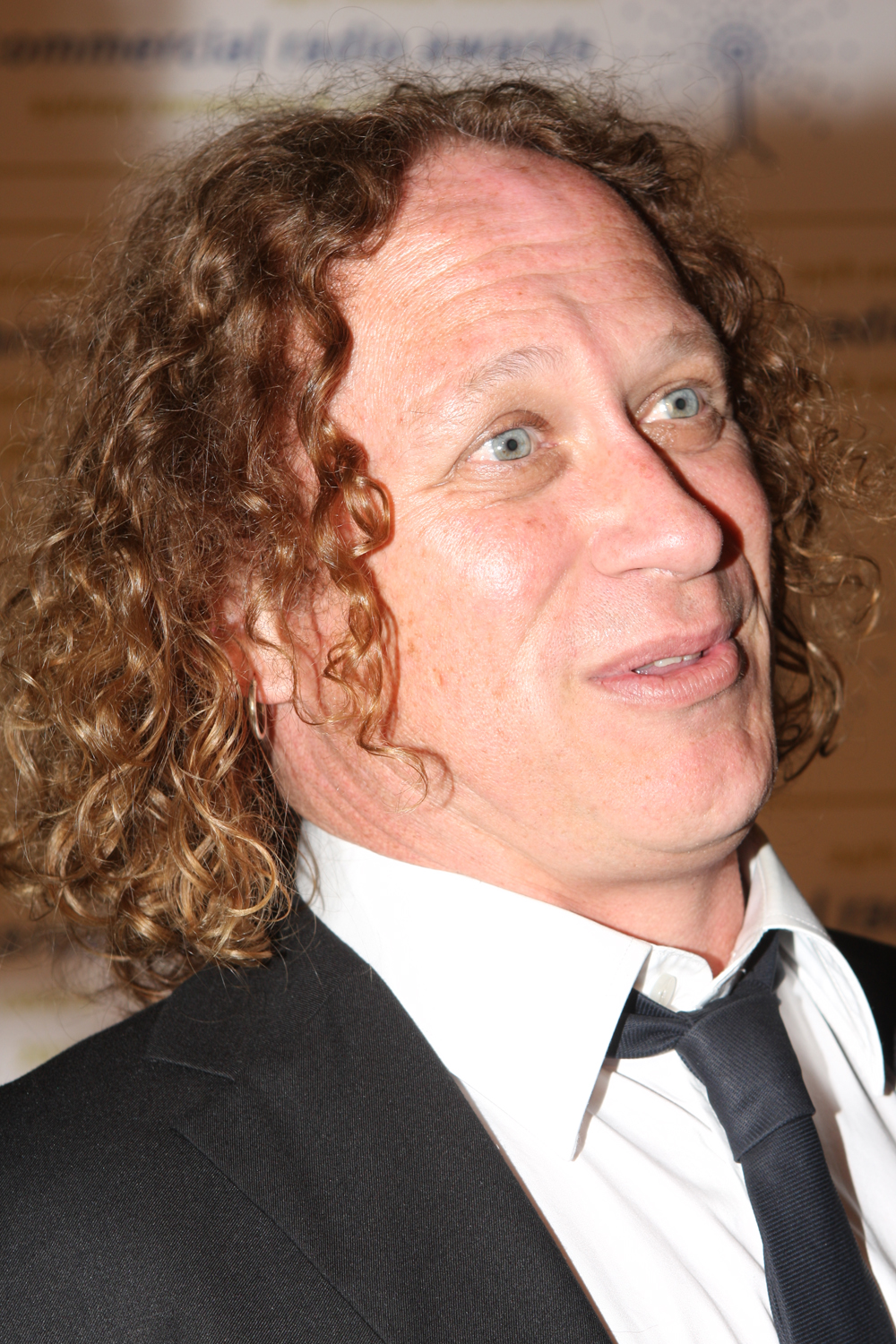
- Gleeson at Australian Commercial Radio Awards in October 2012

Background information
- Born: David Sean Gleeson; June 3, 1968 (age 58); Newcastle, New South Wales, Australia
- Genre: Rock
- Occupation: Singer-songwriter
- Instruments: Vocals, guitar
- Years active: 1985–present

David Sean "Gleeso" Gleeson (born 3 June 1968) is the lead singer of Australian hard rock group The Screaming Jets. With the death of Screaming Jets co-founder and bassist Paul Woseen, he is currently the only remaining original member of the band.

== Early life and education ==
David Sean Gleeson grew up in Newcastle.

He made his stage debut in 1978, with his school choir at the Abermain Eisteddfod.

== Career ==
Gleeson formed his first rock band, Aspect, in 1985, with schoolfriend Grant Walmsley. In January 1989 Gleeson on lead vocals and Walmsley on guitar were joined by Brad Heaney on drums, Richard Lara on guitar and Paul Woseen on bass guitar, to form The Screaming Jets as a hard rock band in Newcastle. Within twelve months they had performed more than 280 live shows, they and won praise from and support slots of The Angels, The Choirboys, and The Radiators.

By late 1989, The Screaming Jets had won youth radio station Triple J's National Band Competition. They signed a recording deal with the leading independent label rooArt.

The Screaming Jets moved from their hometown Newcastle to Sydney's Kings Cross district in early 1990, and recorded their debut album All For One in mostly midnight to dawn sessions at a local studio, after playing live shows seven nights a week.

Late in 2011 Gleeson recorded an album, Take It to the Streets (released 31 August 2012), with his childhood idols, The Angels, as their new lead singer, and they completed a national tour. In 2014, he recorded a second album with them, called Talk The Talk.

On 29 May 2023, he announced he would be leaving The Angels to focus on his Triple M Nights radio show and on releasing a new studio album with The Screaming Jets.

== Radio and television work ==
In 2006, Gleeson appeared as the vocal coach for actress Kate Fischer in the televised celebrity singing competition It Takes Two. He returned to the show in 2007 and partnered with TV presenter, Julia Zemiro.

In early 2011 Gleeson was offered a radio show with the Triple M network. By mid-year he was hosting two shows, Access All Areas and Rock of Ages, interviewing artists including Jimmy Barnes and Don McLean, and giving an inside view of the music industry. On 31 January 2022, he returned to Triple M, filling the 7-10pm nightly slot with his new show Triple M Nights with Dave Gleeson.

== Recognition ==
On 19 June 2016, at the Governor Hindmarsh in Adelaide, Gleeson was inducted into The South Australian Music Hall Of Fame, alongside The Angels.

On 4 August 2025, Gleeson attended the official opening of a new laneway in Adelaide city centre honouring The Angels, called The Angels Lane.
