= Brother Henry =

American rock band

Background information
- Origin: Nashville, Tennessee
- Genres: Rock; Alternative rock; Pop; Southern rock
- Years active: 2004–present
- Members: David Henry; Jeff Henry; Ned Henry; Park Ellis

Brother Henry is a rock band from Nashville, Tennessee. As touring and recording sidemen, they have contributed to artists such as Ben Folds, Indigo Girls, Cowboy Junkies, Guster, Sixpence None the Richer, Steve Earle and R.E.M..

Brother Henry is fronted by twin brothers David Henry and Ned Henry. Along with older brother Jeff Henry and Park Ellis, the group has been called "A Southern Crowded House with a Cello". The genetics of the band allow for a vocal blend that listeners often compare to The Everly Brothers. Based in Nashville, the band continues to build fan support in Nashville, Atlanta, Charlotte, Louisville, Winston-Salem, Asheville and other part of the southeast United States.

For many years, members of the band supported other musical acts. David Henry is a sought-after producer, engineer and cellist. David and Ned Henry have provided strings on many recordings. Both David and Ned have toured with other acts as sidemen including Guster, Josh Rouse and Cowboy Junkies. Park Ellis is a former staff songwriter for Almo Irving Publishing, in Nashville and toured with Sixpence None the Richer.

In 2004, the band released its first album, Come On, People. Their 2004 tour was followed with a live album Live At The Basement, recorded in Nashville. In summer 2005, the band released its second studio album Chasing Happiness, with two tracks featuring guest keyboard player Chuck Leavell (Rolling Stones, Allman Brothers). Ben Folds shot photos for the CD with vintage cameras after David and Ned recorded some tracks for Folds' Epic Records release, Songs for Silverman. In May 2006, Brother Henry was invited to play a concert with the LaGrange Symphony Orchestra in LaGrange, Georgia, and recorded the event for a live album. The band released its third studio album, Love Survives, in June 2007.

== Discography ==
- Come On, People (2004)
- Live at the Basement (2005)
- Chasing Happiness (2005)
- Brother Henry: Live with the LaGrange Symphony Orchestra (2007)
- Love Survives (2007)
- God Is Alive (2009)
