= Shadow Boxer =

Single by The Angels

from the album No Exit
- Released: June 1979
- Genre: Hard rock
- Length: 2:40
- Label: Albert Productions
- Songwriter(s): Doc Neeson, John Brewster, Rick Brewster
- Producer(s): John Brewster, Rick Brewster, Mark Opitz

The Angels singles chronology
"After the Rain" (1978)	"Shadow Boxer" (1979)	"No Secrets" (1980)

"Shadow Boxer" is a song by Australian hard rock group The Angels, released in June 1979 as the lead and only single from the group's third studio album, No Exit.

"Shadow Boxer" first charted on the Kent Music Report Singles Chart on 11 June 1979, peaking at number 25 during a 14‑week chart run. It was co-written by band members, John Brewster, Doc Neeson and Rick Brewster.

== Track listing ==
AP11934

1. "Shadow Boxer" (Doc Neeson, John Brewster, Rick Brewster) - 2:40
2. "Planned Obsolescence" (Doc Neeson, John Brewster, Rick Brewster, Chris Bailey, Graham "Buzz" Bidstrup) - 5:03

== Personnel ==
- Doc Neeson — lead vocals
- Rick Brewster — lead guitar
- John Brewster — rhythm guitar
- Chris Bailey — bass guitar
- Graham "Buzz" Bidstrup — drums
- John Brewster, Rick Brewster, Mark Opitz - producers

== Charts ==
Chart (1979)	Peak position
Australia (Kent Music Report)	25
