= Am I Ever Gonna See Your Face Again =

1976 single by The Angels

Single by The Angels

from the album The Angels
- B-side: "Round We Go"
- Released: 1 March 1976
- Genre: Pub rock
- Length: 3:12 (single version); 4:03 (album version)
- Label: Albert, Mushroom
- Songwriters: John Brewster; Rick Brewster; Doc Neeson
- Producers: Harry Vanda; George Young

The Angels singles chronology
"Am I Ever Gonna See Your Face Again" (1976)	"You're a Lady Now" (1977)
- ISWC T-901.067.910-4

"Am I Ever Gonna See Your Face Again (live)"

Single by the Angels

from the album Live Line
- Released: January 1988
- Label: Albert, Mushroom

The Angels singles chronology
"Can't Take Any More" (1987)	"Am I Ever Gonna See Your Face Again (live)" (1988)	"Love Takes Care" (1988)

"Am I Ever Gonna See Your Face Again" is an Australian rock song written by Doc Neeson, John Brewster and Rick Brewster, and performed by their group, the Angels. The song was initially recorded as a ballad in March 1976 but subsequently re-released as a rock song. The song reached number 58 on the Australian charts and stayed on the charts for nineteen weeks.

A live single was released in January 1988 as the lead single from Live Line. The live version features the expletive-laden audience response, "No way, get fucked, fuck off". This chant has been described by The Guardian's Darryl Mason as "one of the most famous in Australian rock history". The single peaked at number 11 on the Kent Music Report.

In January 2018, as part of Triple M's "Ozzest 100", the 'most Australian' songs of all time, "Am I Ever Gonna See Your Face Again" was ranked number 11. In 2025 the song was voted 12th in the Triple J Hottest 100 of Australian Songs.

== History ==
Neeson said that the song was originally written as an acoustic ballad about grief and loss. The girlfriend of Neeson's friend was killed in a motorcycle collision, and the two friends were discussing life after death. The conversation inspired Neeson to write the lyrics. References to subjects like Santa Fe and Renoir came from Neeson's own experiences.

After British band Status Quo discovered numerous similarities between the song and one of their own ("Lonely Night"), the two bands reached an agreement instead of a lawsuit that saw Status Quo receive royalties from "Am I Ever Gonna See Your Face Again". Status Quo bassist Alan Lancaster was friends with members of the Angels at the time of the incident, and lived next door to John Brewster. In 2015, Brewster recounted having asked Neeson whether the song could have been based on "Lonely Night" and recalls a non-committal response: "I might have heard it at a disco".

=== Call and response ===
Call and response

Band: Am I ever gonna see your face again?
Audience: No way! Get fucked! Fuck off!

The famous response to the question posed in the chorus "Am I ever gonna see your face again?" is "No way, get fucked, fuck off". The response was not developed by the band. Neeson recalled that he first heard the response at Mount Isa in 1983 and was "a bit shocked." Thinking it was a criticism of the band, he asked audience members about it. They responded that the chant had its origins at a blue light disco in Sydney, where the DJ would turn down the volume to encourage the audience response. The discos were a community initiative for teenagers by the police.

Although it is a famous audience chant in Australian rock music history, the exact origins of it are lost. In May 2014 Rick Brewster opined, "I don't think it will ever be solved because too many people put their hand up and said 'I started it' and we don't believe any of it. We just think it's funny, it's the bush telegraph really. The whole country was doing it and then we found when we went overseas the people in America were doing it too." Neeson noted that "it's become the audience's song, it doesn't belong to the band anymore".

The song and its response have become an iconic part of Australian culture, such that the song may be played by any band anywhere in Australia, with the chant sung by whatever crowds are present.

In 1999, Neeson performed the song during a "Tour of Duty concert" for Australian troops in East Timor. The audience responded with the chant while Australia's then commander of the INTERFET forces in East Timor, Peter Cosgrove, East Timorese spokesman Jose Ramos Horta, and Roman Catholic Bishop Belo were in attendance. When asked by Bishop Belo what the crowd was singing, Cosgrove responded, "Well Lord Bishop I really can't quite make it out," adding in a retelling of the story, "Then Ramos Horta looked at me and I could tell that he could make it out!"

== Track listing ==
1976 single (Albert AP-11048)
No.	Title	Writer(s)	Length
1.	"Am I Ever Gonna See Your Face Again"	Doc Neeson, John Brewster, Rick Brewster	3:12
2.	"Round We Go"	Doc Neeson, John Brewster, Rick Brewster	5:28

1988 single (Mushroom K445)
No.	Title	Length
1.	"Am I Ever Gonna See Your Face Again" (live)	4:14
2.	"Shoot It Up"	3:55

== Personnel ==
The Angels

- Chris Bailey – bass guitar
- Buzz Bidstrup – drums
- John Brewster – rhythm guitar, backing vocals
- Rick Brewster – lead guitar
- Doc Neeson – lead vocals

== Charts ==
1976 chart performance for "Am I Ever Gonna See Your Face Again"
Chart (1976)	Peak position
Australia (Kent Music Report)	58

1988 chart performance for "Am I Ever Gonna See Your Face Again" (live)
Chart (1988)	Peak position
Australia (Kent Music Report)	11
