= Graham Bidstrup =

Australian musician, producer, and manager

Graham "Buzz" Bidstrup
- Born: Graham Leslie Bidstrup; 30 August 1952 (age 74); Adelaide, South Australia, Australia
- Occupations: Musician; music producer; songwriter; talent manager
- Instruments: Drums; keyboards; guitar; ukulele

Graham Leslie "Buzz" Bidstrup (born 30 August 1952 height 185 cm) is an Australian musician, songwriter, music producer, and talent manager. He was a member of the Angels (1976–1981), the Party Boys (1983–1984) and formed GANGgajang in 1984. He has managed Jimmy Little, Nathan Cavaleri, Diana Ah Naid and GANGgajang. He was the CEO of the Jimmy Little Foundation from 2005 to 2015 and is the founder and managing director of associated Uncle Jimmy Thumbs Up Ltd.

== Early life and education ==
Graham Leslie Bidstrup was born on 30 August 1952 in Adelaide.

He began his professional career in 1967 as a 15-year-old in Fahrenheit 451 on drums, alongside Roger Ball on lead vocals, Bob Barford on lead guitar, Graham Bettany on bass guitar and Bill Semple on rhythm guitar.

He completed a mechanical engineering course at the South Australian Institute of Technology in the early 1970s.

== Career ==
After graduating, Bidstrup travelled to Europe.

In the mid-1970s Bidstrup was back in Adelaide and joined Red Angel Panic, which variously included Chris Bailey on bass guitar and Rob Tillet on lead guitar, and lead vocals. He also played in other Adelaide bands Taxi (1970s), Pegasus (1970s), and Gotham City (1982).

=== The Angels ===
Bidstrup (a.k.a. Buzz Throckman until 1978) joined Adelaide-band the Angels in August 1976 after the release of their first single "Am I Ever Gonna See Your Face Again". He recorded four studio albums with the band, The Angels (1977), Face to Face (1978), No Exit (1979) and Dark Room (1980). Three of these albums were certified platinum, with two reaching the top ten Kent Music Report albums chart.

In 1980, Bidstrup co-wrote and co-produced the Angels' top ten single, "No Secrets" with their singer Bernard "Doc" Neeson. Bidstrup left the Angels in 1981 to focus on screen music production. He worked on the soundtracks of many films including Heatwave (1982), Starstruck (1982) and Greetings from Wollongong (1983). He produced Australian bands like, the Riptides, the Honeymoon, and the Numbers.

=== Gang Gajang ===
Bidstrup was a founding member of Gang Gajang in Sydney in 1984. During 1983 Bailey (bandmate from the Angels), Mark Callaghan from the Riptides, (a band Bidstrup had previously produced) and Kayellen Bee wrote songs and performed on the soundtrack to the ABC TV series, Sweet and Sour (1984). Bidstrup was also associate music director for the series. With the addition of Geoffrey Stapleton on keyboards and Robert James on lead guitar in 1985, Gang Gajang released four albums. Their self titled album includes the track, "Sounds of Then (This is Australia)". Bidstrup was the music director for the Quiksilver cult surf film, Mad Wax, which showcased Gang Gajang's music. They were consequently voted No. 1 band in the world by the World Professional Surfers' Association for 1988/1989. The group were intermittently active for both live performances and recording; they celebrated their 30th anniversary in 2015.

=== The Party Boys ===
Bidstrup was a founding member of The Party Boys, an all-star covers band in 1982 featuring Kevin Borich, Paul Christie, Harvey James and James Reyne. Their first live album, Live at Several 21st's, achieved gold sales, and their second album, Greatest Hits of Other People, featured singer Richard Clapton and Robin Riley in place of Harvey and Reyne. The last recording Bidstrup made with the Party Boys was in 1983 on "No Song Too Sacred", which featured Shirley Strachan on lead vocals.

=== Other live work ===
He recorded a soundtrack for the film Starstuck with The Swingers, co-wrote and produced two albums for country band the Stetsons, recorded a live album as drummer for Riptides and has played live with many artists including Catfish, the Suave Fucks, Richard Clapton, Dave Steel Band and Jimmy Barnes Band, Australian Crawl and Mondo Rock.

=== Studio work ===
Bidstrup learned his early engineering and production skills under the mentorship of Harry Vanda and George Young at Alberts Records, and then with young engineer Mark Opitz, who co-produced two Angels albums Face to Face and No Exit. To date he has produced or co-produced over 50 albums by artists such as Riptides, The Party Boys, Gang Gajang, The Stetsons, Dave Steel, James Blundell, The Sunnyboys, Nathan Cavaleri, Diana Ah Naid and Jimmy Little and Leah Purcell. He has played as a session musician on albums by artists such as Swanee, Mondo Rock, Richard Clapton, Broderick Smith, Australian Crawl, Dave Steel, James Blundell, Nathan Cavaleri, Aly Cook, Johanna Campbell and Jimmy Barnes

== Awards ==
=== Tamworth Songwriters Awards ===
The Tamworth Songwriters Association (TSA) is an annual songwriting contest for original country songs, awarded in January at the Tamworth Country Music Festival. They commenced in 1986. Bidstrup has won one award.

| Year | Nominee / work | Award | Result (wins only) | |
|---|---|---|---|---|
| 2015 | "Bringing Me to Tears" by Adam James and Graham "Buzz" Bistrup | Alt, Blues n Roots Song of the Year | Won | recipient of ARIA Hall of Fame - |
