= John Brewster (musician) =

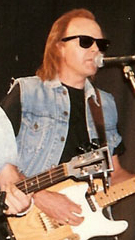
- Brewster in 1988

Background information
- Born: John Carrington Brewster-Jones; 9 November 1949 (age 76); Adelaide, South Australia, Australia
- Genre: Rock
- Occupations: Musician, songwriter, guitarist, singer
- Years active: 1970–present

John Carrington Brewster-Jones (born 9 November 1949) is an Australian guitarist who has played in a number of Australian rock bands, including The Angels and The Party Boys. His father and grandfather Hooper Brewster-Jones were notable musicians.

== Career ==
In 1970, Brewster, with his brother Rick Brewster and Doc Neeson, formed Moonshine Jug & String Band in Adelaide, the band evolved into The Keystone Angels in 1973. An appearance at the 1975 Sunbury Pop Festival, resulted in touring with AC/DC, and with Chuck Berry as his backing band. By the end of 1975 they become The Angels. Other members included Chris Bailey on bass guitar. Brewster left the band and joined The Party Boys in February 1986. He remained with The Party Boys until mid-1989, before teaming up with his friend, Alan Lancaster to form The Bombers.

== Awards and nominations ==
=== Australian Songwriters Hall of Fame ===
The Australian Songwriters Hall of Fame was established in 2004 to honour the lifetime achievements of some of Australia's greatest songwriters.

Year	Nominee / work	Award	Result
2008	himself	Australian Songwriters Hall of Fame	inducted

=== SA Music Hall of Fame ===
John was inducted into the SA Music Hall of Fame on 16 May 2014 alongside his brother Rick, Redgum's John Schumann and Rose Tattoo's Rockin' Rob Riley.

Year	Nominee / work	Award	Result
2014	himself	SA Music Hall of Fame	inducted
