= Chris Bailey (musician, born 1950) =

Australian vocalist & guitarist (1950–2013)

- Born: Christopher Mark Bailey; 31 May 1950; Keith, South Australia, Australia
- Origin: Adelaide, South Australia, Australia
- Died: 4 April 2013 (aged 62) Adelaide, South Australia, Australia
- Genre: Australian rock
- Occupation: Musician
- Instruments: Bass guitar, vocals
- Years active: 1965–2013
- Label: RCA
- Formerly of: Tattered Sole, Red Angel Panic, Headband, Mount Lofty Rangers, Salvation Air Force, The Angels, Gotham City, PM, Invisible Men, Wendy Saddington Band, The Famous Nobodies, Rat Tat Tat, GANGgajang, The Stetsons, Jimmy Barnes Band, Duffhead, The Fallen Angels, Dave Steel Band

Christopher Mark Bailey (31 May 1950 – 4 April 2013) was an Australian bass guitarist and vocalist. He was a member of various rock groups including Headband (1971–1974), the Angels (1976–1982, 2008–2013), GANGgajang (1984–2013) and the Stetsons (1987, 1997). Bailey died of throat cancer aged 62.

== Life and career ==
Christopher Mark Bailey was born on 31 May 1950 in Keith, South Australia, a rural town some 225 km south-east of Adelaide. His parents, Alfred "Bill" Bailey and Gladys (née Spencer), were publicans. Bailey was sent to Prince Alfred College in Adelaide as a school boarder from the age of five.

From the age of 15, Bailey began playing bass guitar with various Adelaide bands. His earliest group was Tattered Sole, which he formed in 1966 while still at school, with James Ashby (guitar/vocals), Rick "Fred" Frolich (lead vocals), Rob Tillett (lead guitar/vocals), and Bob Wiltshire on drums. In 1967 the band replaced Bob Wiltshire with another schoolmate, John Freeman (drums/vocals), Freddy Frohlich with Richard Tipping (vocals/percussion) and Jim Ashby with Robert "Jakes" Jacobs on rhythm guitar.

In 1968, Tattered Sole morphed into alternative rock outfit, Red Angel Panic, featuring Rob Tillett (lead guitar/vocals), Chris Bailey (bass guitar/vocals), John Freeman (drums/vocals), Ken Skinner (keyboards) and Robert "Jakes" Jacobs on rhythm guitar. Chris left the Red Angel Panic in 1971, by which time the line-up featured Rob Tillett (lead guitar/vocals), Chris on bass and vocals, Leon "Moses" Carmen on keyboards and Peter McCormack on drums. The band reformed in early 1971 with Ron Anderson on bass guitar, Lee Cass on drums, Moses on keyboards and Rob Tillett on lead guitar and vocals. Later that year Peter McCormack rejoined the band, replacing Lee Cass. The band broke up in 1972, when Rob Tillett paralysed three fingers on his left hand after a motor cycle accident. However, Red Angel Panic reformed in 1975, with a stellar lineup, including Chris Bailey (bass), Mick Jurd (lead guitar), Russ Johnson (guitar), Graham Davidge (guitar/flute), Moses (keyboards), John Freeman (drums), and Rob Tillett (vocals). The band later included Graham "Buzz Throckman" Bidstrup (drums), then when Buzz joined The Angels in 1976, JJ Hackett on drums. Australian musicologist, Ian McFarlane, described the group's style as "psychedelic/cosmic blues rock" and they were "one of the first outfits of the day to espouse a social and political agenda. The band played the college circuit, as well as the usual round of moratoriums and protest marches". Bailey was recorded on Red Angel Panic's first single, "Viet Rock"/"Private Investigator" (late 1970) and a number of so far unreleased recordings between 1970 and 1977, which are now being remastered to be released in 2015. (Some of these previously unreleased Red Angel Panic tracks are now accessible on SoundCloud.)

In February 1971, Bailey formed Headband with Joff Bateman on drums, Peter Beagley (later known as Peter Head) on keyboards and lead vocals, and Mauri Berg on guitar and lead vocals. McFarlane described this group's style as "progressive/blues rock ... [they] played everything from blues and jazz to folk and country". They disbanded in 1974 and, in March the next year, Bailey issued a solo single, "Sunday Too Far Away", on RCA. Bailey rejoined Head in Mount Lofty Rangers, an "ad hoc country rock outfit", which had a variable line up including Bon Scott. During 1975 Bailey hosted a music TV series on Australian Broadcasting Corporation (ABC), Solid Air. Between 1975b and 1977 he rejoined Red Angel Panic (in its Dangerball phase) and recorded quite a number of tracks with the band, which are being remastered to be released in 2015. He had a short stint with another band, Salvation Air Force.

In 1976, he joined pub rockers, The Angels, with Graham Bidstrup (aka "Buzz Throckman") on drums, John Brewster on rhythm guitar and vocals, his brother Rick Brewster on lead guitar, and Bernard "Doc" Neeson on lead vocals. Upon joining Bailey "allowed Neeson to concentrate on his duties as frontman", Neeson had previously played bass guitar for the group. During New Year's Eve 1979, The Angels performed on the Sydney Opera House steps, where Bailey and Neeson both received head cuts requiring stitches from bottles thrown by the audience. Bailey left the band early in 1982 after working on their first five studio albums.

Bailey worked with a range of artists including Gotham City (with former bandmate, Rob Tillett, in 1982), PM, Invisible Men, Wendy Saddington Band, The Famous Nobodies, and Rat Tat Tat. During late 1983, Bailey was living in Sydney and was approached by ABC to join a songwriting team working on a TV pop music drama, Sweet and Sour (July–August 1984). Bailey co-wrote tracks with Bidstrup and Mark Callaghan (ex-Riptides on guitar and vocals), together they formed a pop rock group, GANGgajang, with Geoffrey Stapleton (ex-The Aliens) on keyboards, guitar and vocals. Bailey remained with the group until his death. Periodically from 2001 he also performed in various line-ups of The Angels.

=== Personal life ===
Just prior to his death, Chris Bailey married his partner, Josie O'Reilly, an actor-comedian, with whom he had a son. In January 2013 Bailey was diagnosed with mouth/throat cancer. The Angels confirmed his condition with a media release in January 2013, "[we] are deeply saddened to learn that our bass player, Chris Bailey, has an aggressive, life-threatening cancer and is now undergoing palliative chemotherapy". Bailey died of the disease on 4 April 2013, aged 62. A tribute concert, Adelaide Salutes Chris Bailey, was held in his honour on 17 April with proceeds donated to his wife and son. The performers included Jimmy Barnes, Ian Moss, Phil Small, and Don Walker (all of Cold Chisel); James Reyne, his own band GANGgajang, Swanee with The Brewster Brothers, and The Angels with Dave Gleeson (of The Screaming Jets).

== Discography ==
=== Singles ===
- "Sunday Too Far Away" (1975)
- "Little Egypt" (with Nathan Cavaleri) (1992) – #63 ARIA
