= Everyone You Ever Knew (Is Coming Back to Haunt You) =

Studio album by Lo Carmen
- Released: 31 October 2015
- Studio: Linear Studios, Sydney, Australia
- Genre: Americana; singer-songwriter; alternative country; folk; indie rock
- Length: 38:34
- Label: Chiquita Records
- Producer: Loene Carmen

Lo Carmen chronology
The Apple Don't Fall Far From The Tree (2013)	Everyone You Ever Knew (Is Coming Back to Haunt You) (2015)	Lovers Dreamers Fighters (2017)

Everyone You Ever Knew (Is Coming Back to Haunt You) is the fifth solo studio album from Australian singer/songwriter Lo Carmen. It was released on 31 October 2015, by Chiquita Records. It was recorded at Linear Studios in Sydney by Wade Keighran and features musicians from Australian bands The Cruel Sea, The Holy Soul and the Mess Hall.

Carmen previewed the album in solo showcases at SxSW 2015 but did not tour it.

== Track listing ==
1. "Everyone You Ever Knew (Is Coming Back to Haunt You)" (5:14)
2. "Black Tambourine" (3:11)
3. "Green Eyes" (4:46)
4. "Traveling Man" (3:28)
5. "Every Mother's Son" (3:10)
6. "Strangers Teeth" (2:50)
7. "Jutta" (4:15)
8. "I Cut My Own Hair" (4:08)
9. "Milliner" (3:51)
10. "Highway Patrol" (6:25)

== Personnel ==
- Lo Carmen – vocals/guitar
- Cec Condon – drums/percussion
- Ken Gormly – bass
- Sam Worrad – guitar/backing vocals/ handclaps

with

- Daniele Marando – backing vocals (on "Everyone You Ever Knew (Is Coming Back to Haunt You)", "Black Tambourine", "I Cut My Own Hair", "Highway Patrol")
- Jason Walker – pedal steel (on "Everyone You Ever Knew (Is Coming Back to Haunt You)")
- Simone East – handclaps

== Reception ==
The single "Everyone You Ever Knew (Is Coming Back to Haunt You)" received limited independent radio airplay and the album received limited coverage but positive critical reception.

Global Texan Chronicles described it as "shadowy and palpable Lou Reed-esque honky tonk realism with so much rare and raw individuality that it takes you aback at first listen. Then your eager addiction slowly burns inside until you’ve played the album on repeat countless times and you’re lost... a true storyteller".

Pan Magazine called it 'A sultry and inviting album ... mesmerising and softly melancholy'

Post To Wire said 'it sounds like the Velvet Underground jamming with Mazzy Star in a Nashville honky tonk after closing time'.

== Notes ==
The album includes a song about German jazz pianist and Blue Note artist Jutta Hipp.

Aden Young directed, shot and edited the "Bollywood meets Southern Gothic" video for the title track while on location in Georgia shooting Sundance TV series Rectify.
