= Lovers Dreamers Fighters =

Studio album by Lo Carmen
- Released: 9 November 2017
- Studio: Butcher Shoppe (Nashville, Tennessee); Welcome to 1979 (Nashville, Tennessee)
- Genre: Americana; singer-songwriter; country soul; country; folk
- Length: 40
- Label: Chiquita Records
- Producer: Lo Carmen

Lo Carmen chronology
Everyone You Ever Knew (2015)	Lovers Dreamers Fighters (2017)

Lovers Dreamers Fighters is the sixth solo studio album from Australian singer/songwriter Lo Carmen.

It was released on 9 November 2017, by Chiquita Records, on limited edition translucent blue vinyl and digital platforms. It was recorded at the studios "Butcher Shoppe" & "Welcome to 1979" in Nashville, Tennessee in sessions over 2016 and 2017. Glide Magazine premiered the first single, "Last Thing I’ll Remember," noting its "gorgeous twangy pedal steel, sensual vocals, haunting guitar and harmonies, and a drumbeat that conveys a quiet loneliness," and stating "the album brings together sultry vintage soul and cosmic country sounds for something that is entirely unique. As a singer and songwriter, Carmen is simultaneously reflective and a storyteller." Follow up single, the duet 'Sometimes Its Hard' featuring Bonnie 'Prince' Billy was released 25 September 2017, premiering on Clash Magazine. The outlet called the track " divine," "a real charmer," and "a beautifully composed piece of music." Carmen wrote most of the songs for Lovers Dreamers Fighters alone, although ‘Sometimes It's Hard’ was written with her husband, Rectify actor Aden Young. Carmen played Jake Bugg's baby Martin guitar on much of the recording. She told 'Something You Said' that the title came to her when 'The words just started appearing like flickering neon in my mind and eventually I realized it had to be the title of the album. I guess it sums us up as human beings, those that aren't on the evil side anyway, we’re all just trying to love the best we can, fighting for our dreams and hopes, plotting and planning for a future of some kind, hopefully one that includes slow dancing, trees and moonlit nights.'

== Track listing ==
1. "Lovers Dreamers Fighters" (5:14)
2. "Sometimes Its Hard"(feat. Bonnie 'Prince' Billy) (3:11)
3. "Last Thing I'll Remember" (4:46)
4. "You Never Learned How To Dance" (3:28)
5. "Rhinestones in the Rain" (3:10)
6. "I Slipped, I Stumbled, I Fell" (2:50)
7. "Hold Your Lover Close" (4:15)
8. "Put Another Record On" (4:08)
9. "Parting Gifts" (3:51)
10. "A Tree in Winter" (6:25)

== Personnel ==
- Lo Carmen – production, vocals, guitar, tambourine, backing vocals, artwork & layout
- Bonnie 'Prince' Billy – vocals on 'Sometimes Its Hard'
- Dave Roe – bass
- David R. Ferguson – engineer, guitars
- Russ Pahl – pedal steel, electric guitar
- Justin Amaral – drums
- Pete Abbott – drums/percussion
- Paul Griffith – drums/percussion
- Matt Combs – banjo, mandolin, violin
- Emma Swift – backing vocals
- Bambi Lee Savage – backing vocals
- Jackie Berkeley – backing vocals
- David ‘Ferg’ Ferguson & Sean Sullivan – Recording at The Butcher Shoppe, Nashville, TN
- Chris Mara – Recording at Welcome to 1979 Studios, Nashville, TN
- Tony Buchen – Additional recording on Tracks 2 and 3 and Mixing – Tracks 3 & 4 at Kingsize Soundlabs, Los Angeles, CA
- Lenise Bent – Additional recording on Track 5 at Evergreen Studios, Los Angeles, CA
- Sean Sullivan – Mixing
- Reuben Cohen – Mastering at Lurssen Mastering
- Katerina Stratos – Album photography
- Aden Young – Inside sleeve photography

== Reception ==
The album received positive critical reception and press coverage in PopMatters, American Songwriter, Culture Collide, Glide Magazine, Uncut, Post To Wire, Bluegrass Situation, Beat Mag, The Music, Country Update, Rhythms Magazine, Sydney Morning Herald, Neighborhood Paper, Atwood Magazine, Guitar Girl, Global Texan Chronicle, Highway Queens, and Something You Said.

Carmen appeared on podcasts 'Guitar Goddess' and 'My Favorite Album with Jeremy Dylan' where she discussed Dolly Parton's seminal album Jolene.

'Lovers Dreamers Fighters' was named 'Best Australian Album 2017' and 'Top 20 Albums 2017' by 2SER's The Outpost as well as landing on 'Post To Wire's Top Twenty Favorite Antipodean Albums of 2017' and 'Top 40 Favorite Albums of 2017'.

== Notes ==
Australian cinematographer Toby Oliver, best known for his work on the Academy Award winning film Get Out and photographer/graphic artist Katerina Stratos directed, shot and edited the highly stylized tennis themed 'Sometimes Its Hard' music video in Glendale, Los Angeles. The humorous clip also featured performer Coati Mundi and premiered on PopMatters on 23 October 2017.
