= Lara Grice =

American actress (born 1971)

- Born: August 11, 1971 (age 54); New Orleans, Louisiana, US
- Occupation: Actress
- Years active: 1987–present

Lara Grice (born August 11, 1971) is an American actress who has appeared in more than 50 movies, notably The Reaping (2007), The Final Destination (2009), Girls Trip (2017) and Body Cam (2020). On television, Grice has had recurring roles on Treme, Salem, Rectify, and Queen Sugar.

Grice was born in New Orleans, Louisiana. Grice began her career studying at the University of Dallas, where she earned a Bachelor of Arts in acting.

== Filmography ==
Year	Title	Role	Notes
1987	Unsolved Mysteries	Pearl Fruge	Episode: "Season 1, Episode 192"
1997	Orleans	Gloria	5 episodes
1996–1997	The Big Easy	Andrea Martell / Maddie	Episodes: "Pilot", "Platinum Blonde"
1997	Favorite Son	Sitcom girlfriend	Uncredited
2001	Above & Beyond	Young Nurse	TV series
2001	Spirit	Virginia the ghost	TV film
2003	Runaway Jury	Blonde Decoy	
2004	Infidelity	Patty	TV film
2004	Stuck in the Suburbs	Mrs. Hooper	TV film
2004	Torn Apart	Cindy	TV film
2004	The Brooke Ellison Story	Home Room Teacher	TV film
2005	At Last	Denise	
2005	Because of Winn-Dixie	Benjean-Megan Buloni	
2005	Locusts: The 8th Plague	Felicia	TV film
2005	Heartless	Secretary	TV film
2005	The Dukes of Hazzard	Female Passenger	
2006	Thief	Selby	Episode: "No Direction Home"
2006	Just My Luck	Jake's Bank Teller	Uncredited
2006	The Novice	Victoria	
2006	Déjà Vu	Reporter	
2006	The Year Without a Santa Claus	Hockney	TV film
2007	The Reaping	Isabelle	
2007	The Staircase Murders	Candace Zamperini	TV film
2007	Girl, Positive	Loren Wiley	
2007	K-Ville	Theresa Beelman	Episode: "Bedfellows"
2008	Soul Men	Peabody Desk Clerk	
2008	Private Valentine: Blonde & Dangerous	Jinny	
2009	12 Rounds	Cell Store Owner	
2009	The Final Destination	Cynthia Daniels	
2010	Maskerade	Lydia Beaumont	
2010	Welcome to the Rileys	Sales Clerk	
2010	Father of Invention	Mom at Park	
2010	Wrong Side of Town	Dawn Kalinowski	
2010	Quantum Apocalypse	Margaret	TV film
2010	My Own Love Song	Neighbor's Wife	
2010	Legendary	Laura Melton	
2010	Knucklehead	Hooker	
2010–2012	Treme	Voice Actor / Megan Harris	14 episodes
2011	The Mechanic	Mrs. Finch	
2011	Justice for Natalee Holloway	Anita Van der Sloot	TV film
2011	1320	Farmer #3	
2012	Lay the Favorite	Waitress	
2013	Bonnie and Clyde	Shopkeeper	TV miniseries
2013–2016	Rectify	Susan Gunter	Episodes: "Plato's Cave", "Jacob's Ladder", "Go Ask Roger"
2014	Ravenswood	Dolores Springer	Episode: "I'll Sleep When I'm Dead"
2014	Salem	Mrs. Hale	10 episodes
2014	American Horror Story	Avon Lady / Female Tourist	Episodes: "Go to Hell", "Tupperware Party Massacre"
2015	Wild Card	First Doctor	
2015	A Sort of Homecoming	Amy's mother	
2015	The Runner	Nurse	
2015	Scream	Mrs. Belmont	Episode: "Ghosts"
2015	The Big Short	Deutsche Auditorium Host	
2015	Scream Queens	Mrs. Putney	Episode: "The Final Girl(s)"
2016	Like Son	Abby	
2016	The Whole Truth	Juror #3	
2016	Free State of Jones	Mrs. Eakins	
2016	Indiscretion	Cathy	TV film
2016	Bad Moms	Tired Mom	
2017	Logan	Car Dealer	
2017	Girls Trip	Bethany	
2017	American Made	Female Reporter	
2017	Heart, Baby	Nurse Rita	
2017	Camera Store	Mr. Nakamura's Secretary	Voice
2017	Same Kind of Different as Me	Bobby's Mom	
2018	American Animals	Mrs. Lipka	
2018	Hometown Christmas	Carol Collins	Television film
2018	The Cybernaturals	Julie Grady	2 episodes
2018	Eat, Brains, Love	Hysterically Sobbing Woman	
2018	The Demonologist	Joan	
2018–2019	Queen Sugar	Vicky Osborn	6 episodes
2019	The Demonologist	Joan Moore	
2019	Raceland	Lynette	Shot film
2019	Eat, Brains, Love	Overly Hysterical Ex Mr. Taligater Dick	
2019	Christmas in Louisiana	Miss Clara	Television film
2019	Camilla, Keep Your Word	Camilla	Shot film
2020	One of These Days	Leslie	
2020	Body Cam	Detective Susan Hayes	
2020	Council of Dads	Karen	1 episodes
2020	Think Like a Dog	Ms. Shackley	
2020	The Cybernaturals	Julie Grady	2 episodes
2020	All My Life	Margaret (Bridal Shop)	
2020	Filthy Rich	Vivian Love	3 episodes
2020	Regret	Patricia	Shot film
2020	Karen with a C	Caren Springle	Shot film
2022	To Die For	Ruth Monroe	
2022	The Thing About Pam	Cousin Mary	4 episodes
2023	We Have a Ghost	TV Producer	
2023	Big George Foreman	Roberta	
2023	Twisted Metal	Mariah	1 episodes
2024	Sex-Positive	Winston's Mother	
2024	Half Baked: Totally High	Miles' Mom	
2025	The Pickup	Waitress	
