= Peter Head =

Australian musician

Peter Head (born Peter Beagley), is an Australian rock musician, pianist, and singer-songwriter. He is best known for his work with the progressive rock band Headband from February 1971 to 1974. He then formed The Mount Lofty Rangers with Bon Scott, best known for his time as the lead singer of AC/DC, on lead vocals.

== Early years ==
Peter Head began playing piano professionally at the age of 13 with "Adelaide's first rock'n'roll band", Johnny Mac and the Macmen as well playing to accompany showgirls at the infamous Hindley Street institution, La Belle, after school. Throughout his teens, he continued piano lessons from a variety of well-known jazz pianists such as Bobby Gebert and Roger Frampton and played modern jazz. He also played many shows accompanying a young Johnny Farnham and Doug Ashdown.

At 17, he attended art school and opened his own art gallery for a short time with his wife. He relocated to London at age 19, working and touring with a reggae band run by Boz Burrell (Bad Company) and moonlighted in various bands and loose formations in a music scene alongside artists such as Georgie Fame, Alan Price, The Foundations, and King Crimson.

== Headband ==
In 1970, Head returned to Adelaide and was playing avant-garde jazz before forming Headband, an adventurous progressive blues/rock band, with vocalist Chris Bailey (later of The Angels) on bass, Mauri Berg (ex Silhouettes) on guitar and backing vocals and Joff Bateman on drums and backing vocals. Headband released three national singles – "Land of Supercars/How I Miss The Country" (1972), "Country Lady/Stay With Me" (1972), and "A Song For Tooley/Brand New Morning" (1973). The album A Song For Tooley (Polydor 2907.008), featuring Sydney Symphony players and a 110-piece children's choir, was released in September 1973.

Headband supported Elton John and John Mayall and toured Australia with The Rolling Stones. Headband went their separate ways in 1974.

On 1 April 2016, Peter Head and Headband was inducted into The South Australian Music Hall of Fame at the Goodwood Institute, Adelaide.

After Headband split in 1974, Head started up Mount Lofty Rangers, an ever-changing group of notable Adelaide musicians that included Bon Scott, Vince Lovegrove, Glenn Shorrock, and Robyn Archer. "Headband and Fraternity were in the same management stable and we both split about the same time so the logical thing was to take members from both bands and create a new one...the purpose of the band was for songwriters to relate to each other and experiment with songs so it was a hotbed of creativity." The band had its own theme song – "The Mount Lofty Rangers Theme" – and featured mainly Head's original compositions.

The Mount Lofty Rangers is the name of the band – so the song goes. But it should be understood that "band" refers not to a fixed group of musicians, but a band of people who work under that name in any capacity they wish. So we have people like Vytas Serelis who does paintings, posters, films etc. Barry Smith who is a welder and mechanic, Dave Colvill who organises things and many others who see the value of putting their individual talents into an unofficial union of productivity. As far as the music goes, there are over 200 people in the last few years who have worked under that name either recording or performing live, and it is to their credit that the Rangers have built a reputation for producing good, original music.

In 1978, he was honoured with a rock award from radio station 5KA for his contribution to the music industry based on his work with the Rangers.

"The '70s were just a special time in Australia at least, where there was a band on every corner in both Adelaide, Melbourne and Sydney and they were all playing original music," he adds. "You just don't get that anymore, you don't get that anywhere in the world. It was a very special time, and very prolific time."

== Stage and screen ==
Head was the resident Piano Bar artiste for five seasons at the Adelaide Festival Theatre and was musical director for a wide array of plays, including Young Mo and Hamlet on Ice.

While touring with Young Mo, Head and script writer Rob George collaborated on bushranger musical Lofty – An Epic From The Annals of Country Rock, which was staged in 1977 at Her Majesty's Theatre, Adelaide. He was musical director, composed the score and performed (with a five-piece Mount Lofty Rangers). An original Bon Scott composition, "I've Been Up in the Hills Too Long", was featured.

In 1978, Head wrote the music for children's musical Fun and Games which was staged at the Arts Centre. Head toured nationally as musical director for the hit Robyn Archer musical, A Star is Torn. He composed soundtrack music for Bob Ellis' 1992 film, The Nostradamus Kid and for Les Patterson Saves The World. Head had a cameo role as "The Beggar" in Aden Young's 2007 short film The Rose of Ba Ziz.

== Bon Scott and Round and Round and Round EP ==
On 20 October 1996, Head released the Bon Scott Round and Round and Round EP on Head Office Records (with label partner, radio announcer and musicologist David Woodhall). The original tracks were recordings from 1974.

"The tracks were recorded for $40 which was all the studio time we could afford then" laughs Head. "Bon and I used to help each other out. I'd write music and he'd sing lyrics of my songs. Those were pioneering days. They were recorded at the first 8 track studio in Adelaide. I'd been carting the tapes around for twenty years and then I met Ted Yanni at Round Midnight and we started talking about new technology and what you could do with older material like this."

"They were just rough demos and a few weeks later Bon went off to join AC/DC and that seemed to be it ... The fun of finishing off something first started 22 years ago really appealed to me", explained Head. In the case of "Carey Gulley", Woodhall had only a cassette dub. It was well received.

For the remixing process, Head teamed up with producer Ted Yanni, another old friend of Bon's, who he felt could fulfill the design for the song that he had intended 22 years prior. Using the best technology available, Ted isolated the original vocal track from "Round And Round". He then spent many months building an entirely new backing track for the song so that it "sounded as though it was recorded today, rather than yesterday." The original version is also included on the CD single. It features former members of Headband and Fraternity. "Carey Gully" celebrates the Mount Lofty Rangers' stomping ground at that time. The entire project was achieved by many people - musicians and technicians donating their time, talent, and studios to pay tribute to an old friend. The result is one of the best recordings available by Bon Scott, displaying a side of his vocal ability that was not as evident in subsequent releases.

Bon Scott and Peter Head had a close bond and enduring friendship. Head has contributed interviews to Bon Scott and AC/DC biographies by Murray Engleheart and Clinton Walker.

Musician Peter Head, former leader of Adelaide's Headband and a virtuoso piano player, befriended Bon. Bon would go to Peter's home after a day shovelling shit, and show him musical ideas he had had during his day's work. Bon's knowledge of the guitar was limited, so Peter began teaching him how to bridge chords and construct a song. One of the songs from these sessions was a beautiful ballad called Clarissa, about a local Adelaide girl. Another was the country-tinged Been up in the hills too long, which for me was a sign of things to come with Bon's lyrics; simple, clever, sardonic, tongue-in-cheek...

About 11 pm on May 3, 1974, at the Old Lion Hotel in North Adelaide, during a rehearsal with the Mount Lofty Rangers, a very drunk, distressed and belligerent Bon Scott had a raging argument with a member of the band. Bon stormed out of the venue, threw a bottle of Jack Daniels on to the ground, then screamed off on his Suzuki 550 motorbike. Three hours later, I received a phone call from his wife, Irene, at Queen Elizabeth Hospital. Bon was in a coma, near death, after a disastrous collision with a car. I drove to the hospital, and there was Bon as I had never seen him; limp, smashed to smithereens, his jaw wired, most of his teeth knocked out, a broken collar bone, several cracked and broken ribs, deep cuts across his throat. He was in a coma for three days. He remained in hospital for 18 days. This happened before Bon was to find fame with AC/DC. Irene tells me that, before Bon went into the coma that night, the nurse sarcastically said to her: "He says he's a singer."

== King Of The Cross ==
Head moved to Sydney in 1980, performing regularly at Kinselas and Kings Cross nightclubs such as Round Midnight, the Bourbon & Beefsteak, Paradise and Springfields, both solo and with regular musical cohorts Doug Williams, Wendy Saddington, Lucky Starr and Jeff St. John. Head's King of the Cross recording was inspired by his years working in the Cross, and is rumoured to be based on Abe Saffron. "Well, the Cross is good, every time you walk down the street there at least ten stories come into your head, all those weird and wonderful people" he explains.

== In The Key of Night ==
In 2003, Head released In The Key of Night a solo piano/voice album, recorded to recreate the feel of one of Head's late night piano bar performances at the urging of Big Beat Music's founder.

If you've ever lived and loved the nightlife, chances are, some stage during your carousing, cruising, boozing and late night losing, you'd have come across Peter Head. His self penned sublime songs and lyrics tell tales tall and true ... Head's night time netherworld of ivory tickling in smoke filled rooms, singing wayward songs about wayward people, is unique in Australia, our very own musical journeyman; always outside the crap and corruption of the music industry, always laying down a magical rolling chord, a riff, a poignant lyric, a primal honed voice – frayed at the edges as it is, rasping, growling, crackling and about as soulful as it gets....This excellent set, beautifully recorded with passion and empathy by the adventurous Big Beat Music label shows Peter Head in his best light yet, highlighting his splendid songs like I Don't Believe and Everything Is Everything. Head's fresh interpretations of songs from a few of his heroes like Tom Waits, Randy Newman and Ray Charles are not only commendable, but demonstrate the uniqueness of his voice and his very original phrasing. Not to mention his world class piano playing. A master.

== Working with his family ==
Head has collaborated with three family members: daughter Loene Carmen, son Joshua Beagley, and granddaughter Holiday Sidewinder.

He features on Carmen's 2009 album It Walks Like Love and has played alongside her opening for artists such as Kinky Friedman, The Handsome Family, Renee Geyer and in the band Slow Hand, which featured the "duelling keyboards" of Head and organ player Johnny Gauci (2000–2005).

In 2013 Head and Carmen independently released album The Apple Don't Fall Far from the Tree, a "charming smoky blues romp driven by Head's bar-room piano." It includes original tunes "Old Hands" and "Songs Don't Care".

Head played in Carmen's bands Automatic Cherry and Honky Tonk Angels (for which he also acted as musical director and assembled the band).

His son, Joshua Beagley, is a disco funk guitarist, composer, studio producer and DJ. His bands include Confection, Professor Groove and The Booty Affair and Swoop. Beagley contributed guitar to the King of the Cross recording.

Head is responsible for suggesting the name for granddaughter Holiday Sidewinder's band, Bridezilla. The three generations (Head, Carmen and Sidewinder) performed together for the first time with Songs of Sydney, a Creative Festival event held at the Museum of Contemporary Art in 2009 in Sydney.

== Other work ==
Head also features on Finnish band Exception to the Rule's 2010 debut album, High And Low.

== Selected discography ==
- 2013: Lo Carmen & Peter Head: "The Apple Don't Fall Far From The Tree"
- 2011: Peter Head: Wandering Blues
- 2010: Peter Head & The Mount Lofty Rangers: Lofty
- 2010: Exception To The Rule: High And Low
- 2009: Songs: Songs
- 2009: Loene Carmen: It Walks Like Love
- 2003: Peter Head: In The Key Of Night
- 1996: Peter Head: King of the Cross (EP)
- 1996: Bon Scott: Round & Round & Round
- 1973: Headband: A Song For Tooley
