= Lo Carmen =

Australian musician

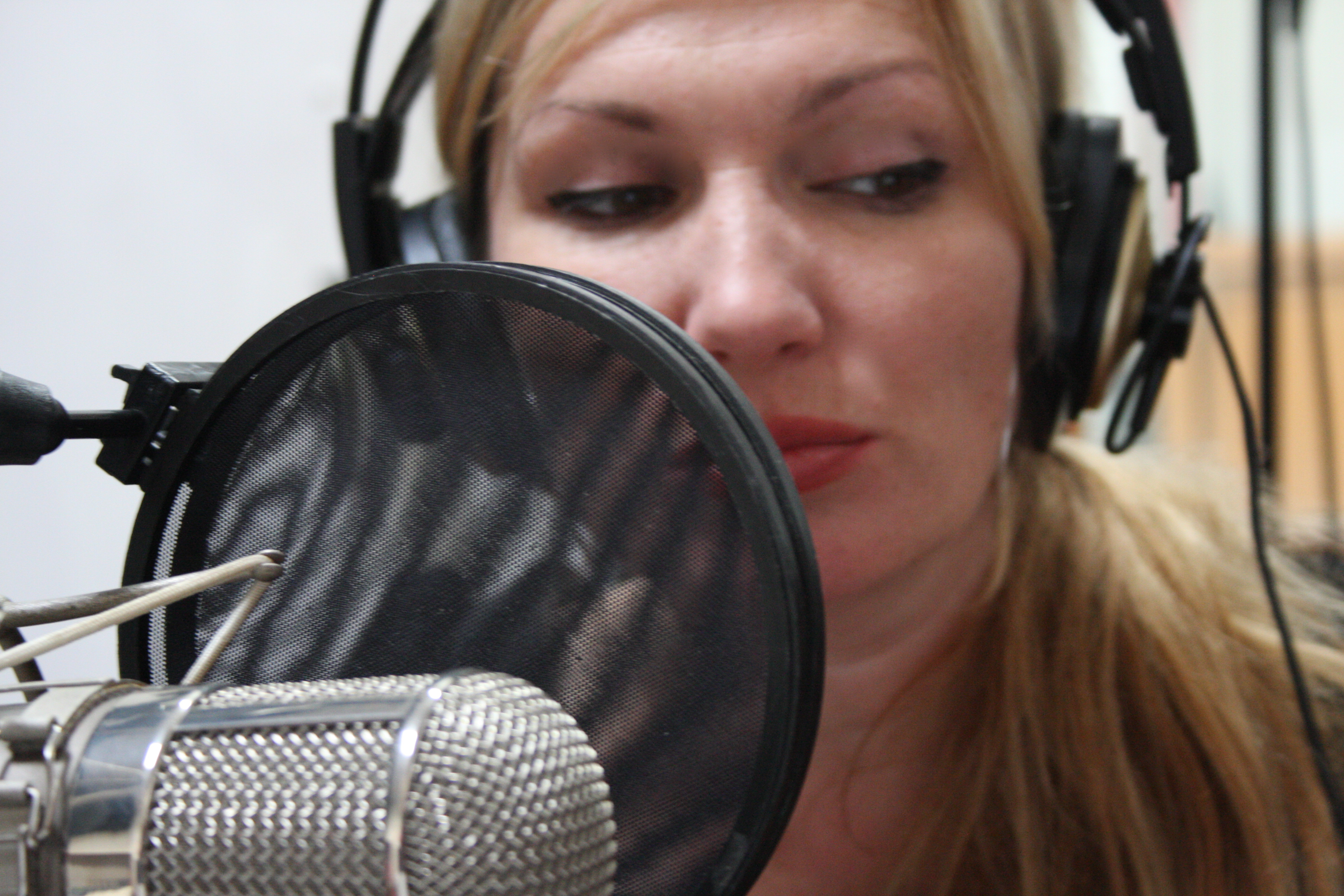
- Lo Carmen recording

Background information
- Born: Loene Carmen; 1970 (age 55–56); Adelaide, South Australia, Australia
- Genres: alt country Americana, singer-songwriter, indie rock, alternative folk, indie, folk
- Occupations: Singer-songwriter, musician, producer, author, actress
- Instruments: Vocals, guitar, percussion
- Years active: 1987–present
- Website: locarmenmusic.com

Loene Carmen (born 1970), better known by her stage name Lo Carmen, is an Australian singer-songwriter, musician, music producer, author and actress with multiple albums in the indie rock vein.

She records, performs and tours solo or with long time band The Great Beyond, published memoir Lovers Dreamers Fighters and received Best Actress and Best Supporting Actress nominations for Australian films The Year My Voice Broke and Tom White.

Carmen's eighth solo album, Transatlantic Light was released in September 2024 on her own label, Chiquita Records, with a limited edition vinyl pressing through Impressed Recordings. Rock critic Will Hermes described it as 'a holy-glowing dreamscape of smoke-clouded guitars, loping basslines and tantric drums that channel a history of sound recordings, from delta blues to chiaroscuro surf reveries, haunted pop ballads to modern bloodied valentines' in his liner notes.

== Lovers Dreamers Fighters book ==
Lovers Dreamers Fighters was published by HarperCollins in February 2022, "a memoir of coming-of-age on screen and in song that also pays tribute to the iconic Australian women—writers, rebels, activists and fellow musicians—who lit her way".

Author Madeleine Lucas said in their Rushh magazine conversation, "At its heart, I felt like Lovers Dreamers Fighters is really a memoir about work. I appreciated that because creative work, like domestic work, is not seen as labour a lot of the time."

Musician Paul Kelly described the book as 'a hard-won account of the mess, glory and risk of making art. Lo tells her story by telling the stories of all those who've lit and tended her flame. She knows that worship is at the heart of creation. And she writes like a river.'

Carmen calls it ‘more a cultural history than a memoir … It’s more a kind of love letter to all the musicians and women that have inspired me.’. The book features chapters focussed on heroic police corruption whistleblower Sallie-Anne Huckstepp (who Carmen portrayed in docudrama Blue Murder, Suzi Sidewinder, who shared her final months living with AIDS in award-winning documentary Suzi's Story to help combat fear and ignorance about the disease, trailblazing artists Wendy Saddington, Robyn Archer, Renee Geyer and Carmen's paternal grandmother, who was an unmarried mother and survivor of the forced adoption policy, as well as stories about pioneering performers Etta James, Patsy Cline, Loretta Lynn, Janis Joplin, Marilyn Monroe, Billie Holiday, Little Richard, Leonard Cohen and Kris Kristofferson.

== Early life ==
Carmen was born in Adelaide, South Australia, and raised amongst its 1970s music and art community, which included Bon Scott and Robyn Archer.

She is the daughter of rock-jazz-blues pianist Peter Head, member of prog rockers Headband and founder of bohemian country music collective The Mount Lofty Rangers, and Mouse, a textile artist and former film and television seamstress. Older brother Josh Beagley is a guitarist, most notably with funk band Swoop and country funk act Cowboy Simple.

She performed her first original song publicly when aged 9, accompanied by her father. She told Sunday Life in 2022 'I spent a lot of my childhood sleeping, or reading a book, beneath his piano at gigs I insisted on accompanying him to'.

The family moved to Sydney's red light district King's Cross and Carmen attended a small alternative high school, dropping out after completing Year 10. 'From the time I was 13, I was going to see bands three nights a week. I also worked after school in a pizza bar in Kings Cross. I was very independent but I wasn't wild.' Carmen also worked as secretary for Vince Lovegrove, who was then the manager of rock band The Divinyls, during school holidays and after leaving school.

Carmen's mother made the wedding dress used as a costume in Muriel's Wedding as well as the iconic costumes worn by The Divinyls’ lead singer Chrissy Amphlett. Carmen claims to have attended hundreds of shows by The Divinyls and soul singer Wendy Saddington, who performed in a duo with Carmen's father, Peter Head, from the 1980s until her death in 2013. Carmen cites both Amphlett and Saddington, a close family friend, as major influences. .

== Film ==
Carmen was cast as the "wild and haunted" Freya Olson in John Duigan's 1987 film The Year My Voice Broke after the director met her in the pizza bar where she worked, aged sixteen. Her performance, and that of her co-stars Noah Taylor and Ben Mendelsohn, was described as "deeply memorable, central characters [that] are played by a trio of fine actors in the formative stages of their careers". She was nominated for an Australian Film Institute Best Actress award for her role as Freya, 'arguably one of Australian cinema's most finely developed female characters, evoking the subtle shades of a burgeoning womanliness.' Mendelsohn calls it 'one of the greatest films I have made'.

Other notable roles followed including Australian police corruption whistleblower Sallie-Anne Huckstepp in the docudrama Blue Murder and Christine in Alkinos Tsilimidos' gritty drama Tom White, for which she also received nominations for Australian Film Institute Award for Best Supporting Actress, Film Critics Circle Award for Best Actor – Female 2004 and IF Awards for Best Actress 2004.

In 2011, director Kriv Stenders brought Carmen and Noah Taylor together again in the Australian film Red Dog, which was described in The Australian as a "warm-hearted and thoroughly entertaining movie". Film reviewing website Cinephelia called their pairing as husband and wife outback pub owners who are the first to find Red Dog, 'a special treat'.

When asked whether she prefers film or music, Carmen explains 'making and working on music is my lifeblood and what I do every day but acting is also second nature to me. They are pretty intrinsically linked in my mind – both require commitment to getting a feeling or a character across, they just use different tools.'

She also told Russh 'With film, you have no power, you just try your best to make somebody else's vision come to life. With music, I feel like I have all the power and I can just put out what I love'.

== Music ==
In 1991, Carmen formed 12-piece country band, The Honky Tonk Angels, with Justine Clarke. The band also featured Noah Taylor, Terry Serio, Monica McMahon (aka Miss Monica), and musical director Peter Head. Guest performers included Robyn Archer and Tex Perkins. They performed in Sydney and Melbourne, appeared live on Tonight Live with Steve Vizard and disbanded in 1992 without recording.

Garage band The White Trash Mamas, emerged from the ashes in 1993, retaining the core axis of Carmen, Clarke and McMahon. They enjoyed a large live following, but attempts at recording, including an unreleased session with Tony Cohen, were unsuccessful and the band broke up in 1995.

'Torch rock' 8-piece band Automatic Cherry formed in 1995, with McMahon and Clarke as backing singers, who told Zan Rowe in 2018 'I've had a long musical association with Loene'. The band also featured musicians Jim Bowman (ex Ed Kuepper), Jon Schofield (ex Paul Kelly and the Coloured Girls), Cathy Green (X), Peter Head and James Cruickshank (Cruel Sea). They recorded one album, Slow Burner, released in 1997 to excellent critical reviews in local press, and disbanded in 1999.

Carmen then formed 'slo-mo disco' duo The Charismatics with Ratcat's Simon Day, where she played bass and sang. They released an EP titled Fateful Gaze in 1999, with an accompanying music video for the title track. Carmen also played guitar in Day's band 51 Monday, along with Nic Dalton and Alison Galloway. They released EP The Rorschach Test also in 1999.

In 2000, Carmen formed Slow Hand, an 'obscure country soul covers' band. with Monica McMahon, Peter Head, John Gauci, Paul Dunn and Steve Wood. They performed extensively in Sydney and Melbourne, supported Nick Cave and the Bad Seeds and recorded an album but the recordings were lost and it was never released.

Carmen began focusing on a career as a solo singer-songwriter in 2001 and Slow Hand disbanded in 2002 after releasing a live album on CD only.

Carmen's bedroom-recorded debut solo album Born Funky Born Free was released in 2001, with contributions from Simon Day and James Cruickshank. Reflecting on the album for Talkhouse in 2022 she said 'The album I ended up making was driven by one-string needly guitar parts played on the Ibanez — which possessed a powerful whammy bar — one-string bass riffs, tinny Casio riffs, and odd sound effects and beats from the drum machine, all fed through delays and reverbs, dub style. The album also had tinges of old school country, soul, and blues, and featured freeform lyrical journeys through imaginary worlds populated by loudspeakers, foxy ladies, horoscopes, dark bedrooms, rivers, shadows, fortune-telling machines, instincts, and destinies.'

In 2004, second album, Slight Delay, described as 'a songbook of exquisitely mournful blues elements and intoxicating rock romantics...intimate shimmering confessionals' featuring Jed Kurzel and Warren Ellis was released on Reverberation Records.

Rock'n'Roll Tears was released on Shock Records in 2007, co-written and recorded with Jed Kurzel and Sam Worrad. Tracks "Nashville High" and "Rock n Roll Tears" were featured in the Australian series Love My Way. It was described as an "impeccably well orchestrated collection of moody, classic rock and roll pieces that highlights Loene's vocal strength and range".

Carmen's fourth album It Walks Like Love was released in December 2009. The album was produced with Burke Reid and recorded with musicians from teenage punk band The Scare and long time collaborator Sam Worrad from The Holy Soul on bass. Special guests include Jed Kurzel (Mess Hall) on duet "Oh Apollo!", Peter Head on piano, with Tex Perkins and daughter Holiday Sidewinder also making an appearance on backing vocals.

A very limited edition CD only EP Hard Candy Christmas (2010) released under the name Sweet Carmo featured country classics by artists such as Dolly Parton, Loretta Lynn and Tammy Wynette. who are cited as major influences, alongside Leonard Cohen, Bob Dylan, Tom Waits and Etta James. It is no longer available online.

After relocating to the US state of Georgia in 2012 while partner Aden Young shot Sundance television series Rectify, Carmen wrote and released The Peach State (2012), a suite of solo country songs, recorded in Nashville with long time Johnny Cash engineer David Ferguson. No Depression called it "...stark country-soul and shimmering blues ...a direct line to the heart that showcases her glorious voice." This release also marked the professional name change from Loene Carmen to Lo Carmen.

In 2013, Carmen released the album The Apple Don't Fall Far from the Tree, a collaboration with her father Peter Head. It was described as "an album high on smoky atmosphere and the ghosts of many a raised glass" and "an endearing mix of country soul and late night jazz". During the subsequent tour, the duo opened for Kinky Friedman and The Handsome Family.

In 2015 she released sixth album Everyone You Ever Knew (Is Coming Back To Haunt You) that features the title track as a single. The album was self-produced and recorded in Sydney over one day by Wade Keighran with musicians Ken Gormly from The Cruel Sea, Cec Condon from The Mess Hall on drums and Sam Worrad on guitar. Global Texan Chronicles called it "shadowy and palpable Lou Reed-esque honky tonk realism with so much rare and raw individuality that it takes you aback at first listen", and described Carmen as "a true storyteller". Pan magazine described it as "true to all of Carmen's creations, it's distinguished by her ability to summon a decade-defying sound and wind up in a world of her own making.' The album includes a song written about mysterious Blue Note jazz pianist Jutta Hipp. Aden Young filmed, directed and edited the videoclip for the single on a farm in Griffin, Georgia.

First single "Last Thing I'll Remember" from seventh studio album Lovers Dreamers Fighters was released on 1 September 2017. Glide magazine described it as 'gorgeous twangy pedal steel, sensual vocals, haunting guitar and harmonies, and a drumbeat that conveys a quiet loneliness' A music video for second single "Sometimes Its Hard" (featuring Bonnie 'Prince' Billy) was released on 26 October 2017. The video was co-directed by Get Out cinematographer Toby Oliver. Lovers Dreamers Fighters was released on 10 November 2017 to generally positive reviews.

Mick Harvey recorded a version of "Nashville High" (co written by Carmen, Sam Worrad and Jed Kurzel) for his 2024 album Five Ways to Say Goodbye. It was singled out as an "album highlight" and "the album's most luminous and upbeat song – though still filled with bittersweet yearning".

Carmen's eighth album Transatlantic Light, again recorded with Ken Gormly, Sam Worrad and Cec Condon under the banner The Great Beyond, also featured guest appearances from Robyn Hitchcock and Peter Head, and was released in September 2024.

Carmen has toured and opened shows for Kevin Morby, Gareth Liddiard (The Drones), Kim Salmon, Eilen Jewell, Magnolia Electric Company, Mess Hall, Paul Kelly, Dirty Three, Renee Geyer and The Secret Sisters in Australia as well as Mick Harvey and Beasts of Bourbon in Europe. She showcased solo at South by Southwest in 2009 and 2016.

Carmen continues to periodically perform shows and release music with her father, who often also guests on her albums.

Regarded her eclectic touring style, she explained in a 2010 interview with Mess & Noise "I prefer to have a core band that I can play with but I'm not a machine playing all the time so when I need people I just have to hope they are available. Plus, I like the idea of being like Chuck Berry, just picking up bands in every town or for different gigs. And that way the songs sound different each time too". She records more than performing live, stating "Making albums is the absolute joy of being a musician for me, especially the joy of recording with other people and the surprises of what they bring."

None of Carmen's albums have charted.

== Personal life ==
Carmen married actor Aden Young in Zebulon, Georgia, in 2014, after a 10-year relationship. They have two sons, Dutch (b. 2007) and Chester (b. 2011). Young directed the music videos for "Everyone You Ever Knew (Is Coming Back To Haunt You)", "Nashville High" and edited Carmen's "Mimic the Rain" clip. Carmen co-composed the score for Young's short film The Rose of BaZiz (2007) and also appeared in it.

Carmen's daughter, pop singer Holiday Sidewinder, was born in 1990, while she was in a relationship with set designer Jeremy Sparks. Sidewinder's godfather is actor Noah Taylor.

== Other writing ==
Carmen has written Loose Connections, a weekly newsletter featuring music and culture essays and recommendations, since 2021.

She has published articles in Rolling Stone and The Guardian and essays in No Depression, Talkhouse,The Big Issue and Neighborhood Paper; and the anthologies Meanjin on Rock 'n' Roll: All Yesterday's Parties, and in Your Mother Would be Proud: True Tales of Mayhem and Misadventure (edited by Jenny Valentish & Tamara Sheward), and contributed to two of the Women of Letters collections (edited by Marieke Hardy and Michaela McGuire)'.

== Discography ==
=== Studio albums ===
- Born Funky Born Free (2002)
- Slight Delay (2004)
- Rock'n'Roll Tears (2007)
- It Walks Like Love (2009)
- Everyone You Ever Knew (Is Coming Back to Haunt You) (2015)
- Lovers Dreamers Fighters (2017)
- Transatlantic Light (2022)

=== Collaborative albums ===
- The Apple Don't Fall Far from the Tree (2013), with Peter Head

=== Singles and EPs ===
- The Peach State EP (2012)
- "The Last Thing I'll Remember" (2017)
- "Sometimes It's Hard" (featuring Bonnie 'Prince' Billy, 2017)
- "Half Girl Half Beast" (featuring The Great Beyond, 2023)

=== Other releases ===
- Slow Burner – Automatic Cherry (1996)
- Fateful Gaze – The Charismatics (1998)
- Leave It at the Door – T: Lo (2010; digital release)
- Hard Candy Christmas – Sweet Carmo (2011; digital release/limited edition of 25)

=== Guest appearances ===
- Three Legged Dog – Cruel Sea (1994)
- Gas Food and You – The Stepfords (1994)
- Intoxicated Man – Mick Harvey (1995)
- Pink Elephants – Mick Harvey (1997)
- Stardust Five – Stardust Five (2006)
- Bang! – The Wallbangers (2007)
- Tribute to Rowland S. Howard – Various Artists (2007)
- Devils Elbow – Mess Hall (2007)
- Damn You, Ra – The Holy Soul (2009)
- RocKwiz Duets: With A Little Help From Our Friends Vol. 4 – Various Artists (2013)
- Sunnyholt – Perry Keyes (2015)

== Selected filmography ==
=== Film ===
Year	Title	Role	Notes
1987	The Year My Voice Broke	Freya Olson	
1993	The Nostradamus Kid	Meryl	
2004	Tom White	Christine	
2007	The Rose of Ba Ziz	Ba Ziz folk	Short film
2011	Red Dog	Maureen Collins	

=== Television ===
Year	Title	Role	Notes
1995	Blue Murder	Sallie-Anne Huckstepp	
1997	Heartbreak High	Sophie	
2005	Spicks and Specks	Self	
2009	Rockwiz	Self	

== Music videos ==
- "My Friends Call Me Foxy" (2002)
- "The Things That Matter" (2004)
- "Nashville High" (2006)
- "Mimic the Rain" (2009)
- "The Peach State" (2012)
- "Old Hands" (2013)
- "Everyone You Ever Knew (Is Coming Back To Haunt You)" (2015)
- "Sometimes Its Hard (feat. Bonnie 'Prince' Billy)" (2017)
- "I Just Had To Run" (2024)
- "Fix Your Heart Or Die" (2024)

== Awards and nominations ==
- 1987: Australian Film Institute Awards nomination for Best Actress (The Year My Voice Broke)
- 2004: Film Critic's Circle nomination for Best Actor – Female (Tom White)
- 2004: Inside Film Award nomination for Best Actress (Tom White)
- 2004: Australian Film Institute Awards nomination for Best Supporting Actress (Tom White)
