= List of Rectify episodes =

Rectify is an American television drama series created by Ray McKinnon. The series stars Aden Young as Daniel Holden, a man who was convicted and put on death row at the age of 18, for the rape and murder of his childhood sweetheart. When new evidence comes to light, Daniel is released and returns to his family in his old hometown.

The series premiered on Sundance TV on April 22, 2013. On May 1, 2013, Sundance TV ordered a second season of ten episodes, which premiered on June 19, 2014. On August 18, 2014, a third season was ordered by Sundance TV, that premiered on July 9, 2015. Prior to its third-season premiere, Rectify was renewed for a fourth season. The fourth and final season, consisting of eight episodes, premiered on October 26, 2016.

During the course of the series, 30 episodes of Rectify aired over four seasons.

== Series overview ==
Season	Episodes	Originally released	
Season	Episodes	First released	Last released
1	6	April 22, 2013	May 20, 2013
2	10	June 19, 2014	August 21, 2014
3	6	July 9, 2015	August 13, 2015
4	8	October 26, 2016	December 14, 2016

== Episodes ==
=== Season 1 (2013) ===
No. overall	No. in season	Title	Directed by	Written by	Original release date
1	1	"Always There"	Keith Gordon	Ray McKinnon	April 22, 2013
Daniel Holden, met by his lawyer Jon Stern, mother Janet, sister Amantha, stepfather Ted Sr., stepbrother Ted Jr. ("Teddy"), and Teddy's wife Tawney, leaves a Georgia prison after serving 19 years on death row. New DNA evidence implies that 18-year-old Daniel was either not responsible or not solely responsible for the rape and murder of his 16-year-old girlfriend Hanna, as had been alleged during his trial. State senator Roland Foulkes, who prosecuted the case, says Daniel hasn't been exonerated and will still be pursued by the law; Foulkes recalls that two witnesses, George and Trey, both testified that they saw Daniel placing flowers atop Hanna's body. Amantha drives Daniel around town, and their younger half-brother Jared tries to bond with Daniel by watching Dazed and Confused with him. A flashback introduces Kerwin, a death row inmate in the cell next to Daniel's. The two inmates had developed a friendship though they could hear but not see one another. Trey and George meet by a river and have a cryptic conversation. After Trey leaves, George shoots himself in the head.
2	2	"Sexual Peeling"	Billy Gierhart	Ray McKinnon	April 22, 2013
Daniel goes to a buffet and a driving range with Teddy, who's nervous about business at the family's tire store if Daniel comes to work there. Daniel tells him about getting repeatedly gang raped in prison. Jon tries to halt his relationship with Amantha, feeling it's inappropriate, but he fails. At a family barbecue, Jon tells Ted Sr. that state prosecutors will continue to pursue Daniel. Daniel and Tawney speak for the first time and find a connection. Teddy gifts Daniel an erotic magazine which he uses to masturbate in private. He hears a floorboard creak in front of his room afterwards, as Amantha checks in on him but quickly retreats.
3	3	"Modern Times"	Nicole Kassell	Story by : Evan Dunsky; Teleplay by : Evan Dunsky and Graham Gordy & Michael D. Fuller	April 29, 2013
Daniel deals with lifestyle changes brought about by two decades of technological development. Senator Foulkes is dressing after a dalliance with Marcy, the waitress from the local diner when she mentions that Amantha is having a sexual relationship with the family's new lawyer, Jon. Rutherford Gaines, Daniel's previous defense lawyer, is revealed to have cancer. Daniel retreats to the attic, where he finds his father's hunting gear, as well as his own walkman and an old mixtape from Hanna. He later goes to a hybrid skateboard/BMX park with Jared. Amantha is in a bar drinking with Jon when a man asks if Daniel is going to live at home; she replies that she doesn't know. Amantha tells Jon they have to leave the bar and nervously informs him that the man is Hanna's brother, Bobby Dean.
4	4	"Plato's Cave"	Jim McKay	Graham Gordy & Michael D. Fuller	May 6, 2013
Daniel gets eyeglasses and goes shopping with Janet at the local Walmart. As they try to leave, an overzealous TV crew approaches them and causes Janet to have a panic attack. At a seminar out of town, a friend talks to Teddy about getting out of the nickel and dime tire business and doing government contract work. Daniel visits Tawney at her church, where she expresses shock that Daniel did not contemplate the afterlife instead of just preparing for the moment of his death. Daniel runs into a female acquaintance as he is window shopping at a closed bookstore. She offers him a haircut and they end up sleeping together.
5	5	"Drip, Drip"	Romeo Tirone	Ray McKinnon	May 13, 2013
Daniel experiences a series of events with a man who gives him a ride after he visits Hanna's house. Together they steal goats, go to a pecan grove to admire a statue there, and wrestle. Teddy returns home from a tire convention to the news that Daniel is going to get baptized at Teddy's church. After his baptism, Daniel speaks somewhat incoherently to Tawney about the "goat man" incident before inappropriately asking her if he can kiss her. Teddy confronts Daniel that night at the tire store about coming on to his wife, and tells him to stay away from the both of them. He also questions why Daniel didn't fight back during his prison rape. After Teddy insults Daniel under his breath, Daniel suddenly appears behind him and puts him in a chokehold until he passes out.
6	6	"Jacob's Ladder"	Ray McKinnon	Ray McKinnon	May 20, 2013
Teddy awakens from the chokehold on the floor, with his pants around his ankles and coffee grounds on his bare backside. Daniel goes to Amantha's house and asks if they can go to the pecan grove that they used to visit with their father. They go to the grove, which is the same area the "goat man" took Daniel to, only there is a different statue there. Daniel admits to Amantha that he does not know what happened the night Hanna died. Amantha points out that he was high on mushrooms at the time of the incident. Trey finds George's body by the river. He takes George's belongings, including George's gun, wallet and cellphone, and pushes the corpse into the river. A flashback to Daniel's time in prison shows Kerwin getting picked up for his execution. Kerwin emotionally tells Daniel he knows that Daniel didn't kill Hanna. Daniel finally finds the bookstore open and buys a present. He visits Hanna's grave while listening to the mixtape she made him. Two cars pull up behind him and men get out. They beat Daniel and the leader removes his mask, revealing himself to be Bobby Dean. Bobby urinates on Daniel before the men leave. Later, a barely conscious Daniel is loaded into an ambulance. A flashback shows Daniel pacing his jail cell while he hears the sounds of Kerwin's empty jail cell next to his being cleaned and made ready for its next occupant.

=== Season 2 (2014) ===
No. overall	No. in season	Title	Directed by	Written by	Original release date	U.S. viewers (millions)
7	1	"Running with the Bull"	Stephen Gyllenhaal	Ray McKinnon	June 19, 2014	0.145
Following his beating, Daniel is comatose in an Atlanta hospital, while Bobby Dean returns home to his mother, Judy. In a flashback, another inmate, Wendall, speaks to Daniel after Kerwin is gone, and reveals that he had participated in gang raping Daniel in the shower. He does so while masturbating, which causes Daniel to have a breakdown. Sheriff Daggett insists on pursuing Daniel's attackers, despite the reluctance of his partner, Lid Comphrey, and possible backlash from the Paulie community. The comatose Daniel has a dream in which he takes Kerwin to the pecan grove, where the statue has lost its head. Kerwin encourages him to live.
8	2	"Sleeping Giants"	Dennie Gordon	Scott Teems	June 26, 2014	0.118
Daniel's doctor decides it is time to awaken Daniel from his medically induced coma. Teddy has several ideas for increasing the struggling tire shop's revenues, such as renting affordable rims. Ted Sr., however, rejects these ideas, holding onto the tradition of selling tires. Tawney confesses to Teddy that his suspicions regarding her and Daniel were justified, as Daniel had romantic feelings for her, and Tawney had feelings for Daniel as well. Jon visits Hollis, a client who is on death row and has lost an appeal after DNA test results showed he was lying about his innocence. This tarnishes Jon's perfect record for appeals. Sheriff Daggett wants to interview a young boy named Stevie who was an eyewitness to Daniel's beating, although his mother is reluctant. Daniel wakes up from his coma in the present to be greeted by his mother and sister.
9	3	"Charlie Darwin"	Stephen Gyllenhaal	Coleman Herbert	July 3, 2014	0.135
When Sheriff Daggett asks Daniel if the man who removed his mask was Bobby Dean, Daniel insists it was a stranger. Teddy still wants to set up a rim rental business in the tire shop and is trying to get Janet to sign the contract, as the store is in her name. However, she quickly dismisses Teddy before he can tell her about it while Daniel and Amantha argue. With Tawney's tentative permission, Teddy puts up their house as collateral for his bank loan. In flashbacks, Daniel struggles with depression, causing him to lash out. He agrees to take medication prescribed by a sympathetic doctor. Daggett visits Bobby Dean in his cell and asks him what he plans to do with his life after prison, before releasing him and implying that in some cultures Bobby would feel indebted to Daniel for letting him go free. Bobby answers, "Not in this one."
10	4	"Donald the Normal"	David Lowery	Kate Powers & Ray McKinnon	July 10, 2014	0.179
Amantha has second thoughts about moving to Atlanta. To motivate herself to stay in Paulie, she gets a job as a cashier at a strip mall thrift store. Teddy, still feeling hurt by Tawney's confession of her feelings for Daniel, visits Daggett and relates the coffee grounds incident, though he refuses to press charges. Daniel visits Atlanta, where he enjoys his anonymity and speaks with a group of middle aged women at an art gallery, introducing himself as "Donald". However, this experience is tarnished when a couple in a cafe recognize him and request to take a photograph with him. He complies, but when he states that he's not interested in talking to them further, they grow angry, claiming the "wrong man was set free". Daniel returns home and, finding his mother's house empty, immediately sets about tearing the kitchen apart in a misguided effort to begin work on the planned remodel.
11	5	"Act as If"	Andrew Bernstein	Victoria Morrow	July 17, 2014	0.196
Ted Sr. starts to lose patience with Daniel after he destroys the kitchen. This, in turn, drives a rift between Ted Sr. and Janet, who demands he be patient with her son. Rutherford Gaines passes away. Tawney reveals to Teddy that she may be pregnant. Daniel, searching for a Wedgewood stove to install in the kitchen, arrives at a rummage shop owned by an eccentric old man named Lezley, who recognizes Daniel and invites him to a party. There, Lezley ties himself to Daniel to make sure Daniel doesn't drift off by himself and instead stays near Lezley. He offers Daniel cocaine and they shoot at CDs, though Daniel is reluctant to handle a shotgun before eventually giving in. Lezley also gives Daniel psychedelic mushrooms "for later."
12	6	"Mazel Tov"	Jim McKay	Chad Feehan	July 24, 2014	0.203
A pregnancy test confirms that Tawney is pregnant with Teddy's baby, but she asks him to keep it secret. Amantha and Jon decide to be open about their relationship, but they have an unpleasant experience at a roller skating rink. Daniel attends Gaines' funeral and gives a speech. The Holden-Talbot family gathers for Janet's birthday, though Daniel, still searching for a Wedgewood stove with Lezley, misses most of it. Seeing Tawney and Daniel in conversation at the party, Teddy impulsively announces Tawney's pregnancy to the family. Senator Foulkes pressures Daggett to reveal any pertinent information after Rutherford Gaines' funeral. Giving in, Daggett reveals Teddy's coffee grounds story, which Teddy had told him in confidence. While on mushrooms at the river, Daniel hears Hanna's voice saying his name.
13	7	"Weird as You"	Sanaa Hamri	Coleman Herbert	July 31, 2014	0.120
The prosecutor prepares to offer Daniel a plea deal that Jon begins to consider. Senator Foulkes and Daggett visit the tire shop to ask Teddy to press charges against Daniel, for the sake of reopening Daniel's case and strengthening the prosecution's position. Teddy refuses, knowing it would rip his family apart, and claims that he made the story up. After Daniel's mushroom trip, in which he had visions of Trey and George, Daniel visits Trey. Trey drives him to George's house in Florida. He claims that Daniel never had intercourse with Hanna that night, but says he believes Daniel saw from afar Hanna having sex with Trey and several others. Trey believes George had some personal demons and may have killed Hanna. Trey then goes on to insult Hanna and ridicule Daniel, before Daniel snaps and shoves him against the wall.
14	8	"The Great Destroyer"	Billy Gierhart	Story by : Scott Teems; Teleplay by : Scott Teems and Ray McKinnon	August 7, 2014	0.173
Trey leaves Daniel and his bicycle behind in Florida, so Daniel calls Tawney from a roadside station to pick him up. They discuss their feelings for each other, but Tawney assures him they cannot be together. Daggett talks with the former sheriff about the original case against Daniel, to learn any new information, as Daggett wants to get this right. When Daniel returns home, Jon tells him about the plea deal, which would require Daniel to plead guilty. The family discusses the deal and Daniel considers taking it, but only if he would not have to serve any more time. Jared visits Teddy's house, stays for dinner, and tells Teddy and Tawney about the plea deal. Jon leaves a voicemail for the District Attorney, rejecting the current plea deal. Ted Sr. meets with Sen. Foulkes and the senator tells him about Daniel's assault of Teddy. In his room, Daniel listens to his confession on tape while he strangles a homemade dummy made of pillows and blankets.
15	9	"Until You're Blue"	Seith Mann	Victoria Morrow & Scott Teems	August 14, 2014	0.124
While at the doctor's office, Tawney learns she had a miscarriage. Jon tells Daniel that he could be set free, but only if he leaves Paulie and is permanently banished from the state of Georgia except for one county. At home, Tawney tells Teddy of the miscarriage. Ted Sr. visits Sen. Foulkes and warns him to never speak with his family again. In a flashback to death row, Chaplain Charlie reads Daniel a letter addressed to him from Amantha. In the present, Daniel tells Amantha of the banishment clause, but he is unsure he will take the deal. While trying to inform his mother about it, he simply states he cannot live at home anymore. Teddy confronts Tawney about her calm way of dealing with the miscarriage and accuses her of never having wanted to have a baby with him. Teddy tells her she is free now to be with Daniel, and: "Maybe you'll get lucky. Maybe he'll kill you, too. Put you out of your misery." Crying, Tawney leaves. Teddy, frustrated with customers who are not paying their rim rental bills, drives to one of their homes to try and repossess the rims himself. However, he ends up in a fight with the customer. Tawney checks into a motel and calls Daniel. When Daniel arrives, she asks if he is a bad person, and he responds, "Yes". The two of them dance together.
16	10	"Unhinged"	Stephen Gyllenhaal	Ray McKinnon & Kate Powers	August 21, 2014	0.165
At the motel, Daniel tells Tawney he is leaving Paulie; she states she is leaving, too. He also mentions his assault of Teddy and that Teddy did not deserve it. Teddy visits Janet, who coaxes him into telling her of Tawney's miscarriage. Sen. Foulkes tells D.A. Pearson to arrange a debriefing, where Daniel will have to verbally confess to having murdered Hanna. Daggett goes to Florida in search of George and views security footage of Trey and Daniel. In a flashback to death row, Daniel is visited by Amantha who says that the Justice Row organization is "all in" (echoing Jon's words in the present), that they're sending a new lawyer and that they will help free him. In the present, Amantha and Jon discuss their relationship, and she encourages him to take the job he was offered in Boston, but she will not join him. Ted Sr. confronts Daniel about his assault of Teddy, and Daniel tells Janet he wants to take the plea deal and will have to leave Georgia. Amantha tells Daniel he is a coward and she will distance herself if he confesses to killing Hanna if he did not do it. Tawney goes home and tells Teddy she is sorry for what Daniel did to him and that she needs time. She leaves with a suitcase. In the debriefing, Daniel says he did not rape Hanna and claims that his original confession was coerced. Daniel ignores Jon's advice to go to trial and later confesses to strangling Hanna. Daniel and Jon wait for the judge's decision on the plea. Meanwhile, kids playing by the river discover George's body. Bobby Dean finds Jared in Hanna's bedroom and tells him to take whatever he wants. The sheriff orders a test on Trey's DNA and that found on cigarette butts in George's house. Teddy goes to the sheriff's station to see if he can still press charges against Daniel, and Daggett quickly calls the District Attorney's office.

=== Season 3 (2015) ===
No. overall	No. in season	Title	Directed by	Written by	Original release date	U.S. viewers (millions)
17	1	"Hoorah"	Stephen Gyllenhaal	Ray McKinnon	July 9, 2015	0.224
Daggett tells Teddy that the judge has accepted the plea deal, Daniel must leave Georgia within 30 days, and that it is too late to add Teddy's testimony to the plea deal. Daggett adds that Teddy can still press charges against Daniel, but Teddy leaves. Daniel has dinner with Janet and Ted Sr. when Teddy arrives and causes tension. Outside, Teddy tells Daniel to stay away from Tawney, and he will press charges against him if he does not. Daggett and D.A. Person look over George Melton's corpse in the coroner's office and believe it was suicide, but they need to find the gun. Ted Sr. tells Daniel that he should confess what he did to Teddy to his mother, and that he should live somewhere else for his remaining time in Georgia. Tawney stays at her friend Beth's house and is advised by her to see a marriage counselor with Teddy due to the miscarriage. Janet learns of Teddy and Tawney's marital problems when she stops by Teddy's house. The thrift store manager informs Amantha that the woman whose job Amantha took over is coming back from maternity leave, but Amantha could keep her job if she pursues a management position. Daniel visits Amantha and asks if he can stay with her. At the diner, Sen. Foulkes suffers a stroke.
18	2	"Thrill Ride"	Lawrence Trilling	Ray McKinnon	July 16, 2015	0.165
Janet confronts Ted, Sr., believing he is hiding something from her, leading him to mention Daniel's assault of Teddy. Tawney, in a session with her therapist, confesses that she was relieved when she suffered her miscarriage and mentions Teddy's anger issues. Daggett tells D.A. Person that he searched George's trailer in Florida and what he discovered, including his wallet and cell phone, even though his cell phone was last used in Paulie six weeks previously. Amantha arrives late for work, hung over from the previous night. Jon visits Janet, and says that he will be moving and that he and Amantha have broken up. He gives her information for Daniel, about a non-profit organization that offers career and psychological counseling for ex-offenders. Daniel runs into his old friend and Amantha's landlord Melvin at the apartment complex. Daggett visits George's father about his son's death; Mr. Melton says it is unlikely George would have killed himself with a gun and suggests Daggett should investigate Trey, who came looking for George recently. Daniel cooks a nostalgic meal for Amantha and tells her he got a job painting the pool in the complex, but Amantha tells him, "This is all very thoughtful, Daniel, but I just can't pretend that I give a shit." Jared visits Teddy's house to see how he is doing. Teddy, drunk, suggests they go for a car ride. Teddy instructs Jared to drive to Beth and Mitch's house, so he can watch Tawney. Teddy confesses to Jared about when he lost his virginity, and that he did it in an aggressive way, through pressure; and tells Jared to never do the same.
19	3	"Sown with Salt"	Billy Gierhart	Coleman Herbert	July 23, 2015	0.142
Daniel has a meeting with his probation officer who outlines the stipulations of his probation. Daggett tells Daniel about George's death and questions him about his visit to his trailer. Daniel declines questioning without Jon present. Amantha attends a Thrifty Town management training retreat, where she's asked to reveal a story about herself–she tells everyone about her brother who was on death row. Tawney returns home to pick up clothing, and Teddy is there, where he says he'll see the therapist with her. Daggett questions Trey about his visit to George's trailer, and Trey tries to falsely incriminate Daniel by saying he wanted to hurt George and that it was his idea to visit him. Ted, Sr., and Teddy work on the kitchen, but Janet shows a loss of interest in the renovation. In a flashback to death row, Daniel is visited by Jon where he tells him he'll be getting out. Amantha goes to the hotel bar where she ends up talking with a man who buys her a drink. After talking and flirting, they go upstairs, where Amantha invites him to her room. In Daggett's office and with Jon present, he questions Daniel again. Daggett tells Daniel that his fingerprints were found on George's wallet and cell phone, Daniel replies that he believes Trey wiped them clean to plant evidence. Daniel denies killing George, and tells Daggett it was Tawney who picked him up in Florida and about his assault of Teddy. Jon is shocked about the news of the assault and ends the questioning. Jon later warns Daniel about his behavior and that it could land him back in prison. Back at the apartment complex, Daniel begins painting the pool in the middle of the night.
20	4	"Girl Jesus"	Scott Teems	Scott Teems	July 30, 2015	0.177
Marcy visits Sen. Foulkes at the hospital, and leaves after trying to help him. Daggett questions Trey about the color of his truck, and tells him that it was George's semen found on Hanna's underwear. Amantha meets Jon, where he tells her that he is staying in Paulie to help Daniel. Jon tells Amantha about George's murder and that Daniel had a motive, but believes Trey is a suspect too. Daniel is warned by his probation officer that he must be contactable at all times and has yet to submit a needed form signed by his sister. In therapy, Teddy is asked to talk about his childhood, including his addict mother. Tawney, who is silent during the session, is told by Teddy to finally tell the truth for once, where she reveals she might not want to be married to Teddy anymore; Teddy, feels relieved that she has finally told the truth. After therapy, Tawney tells Teddy that Daggett has requested to speak with her, and reveals that she had picked up Daniel in Florida. Daniel gets the form signed by Amantha and drops it off before the deadline. Daggett questions Tawney, but she reveals nothing of relevance, and confirms what Daniel was wearing, different to what Trey told Daggett earlier. Daniel returns to his mom's home where he gathers clothing she bought for him and later falls asleep. He wakes up and finds Trey in the house, where Trey remarks about Daniel's lost years in prison. D.A. Person speaks with Daggett, telling him she has a warrant for George's trailer. Daggett believes Daniel did not kill him, and that Trey's behavior is suspicious, that he seems to trying to pin the murder on Daniel. Janet and Ted, Sr. continue to fight after the reveal of what Daniel did to Teddy. Teddy drives Tawney to the neighbor's house, and after breaking down, she begins to kiss him, but eventually pulls away. At Amantha's, Daniel tells her that he was in love with Tawney and that "I thought she was my savior". Later, he stares at the pool he just finished painting, but intentionally knocks a paint can over the pool, ruining the paint job. He begins to cry.
21	5	"The Future"	Nicole Kassell	Ray McKinnon & Kate Powers	August 6, 2015	0.113
Immediately regretting his sabotage of the pool job, Daniel starts repainting it the following morning. However, Melvin explains to Amantha that the other tenants of the apartment complex want Daniel out by the end of that day, a decision with which he must comply because Daniel is not on the lease. Nonetheless, Daniel resolves to finish the pool job before he goes. Teddy starts seeing the therapist on his own, and explores his anxieties of losing Tawney. Tawney moves back in with her old foster mother temporarily, but Teddy offers to let her stay in their house while he moves elsewhere. Janet gives both Teds the ultimatum that they must allow Daniel to stay at the Holden-Talbot house for his last two weeks before exile, and openly acknowledges Teddy's assault for the first time. Following his investigations, Sheriff Daggett interviews Daniel and explains that he believes Trey murdered George Melton (which is false). Later he obtains a warrant to search Trey's home, and police do so in the presence of Trey's wife and daughter. Daniel, Amantha, Jon, Janet and Jared gather at the finished pool that night, before Daniel moves out of the apartment, and Daniel asks his mother if she would like to go on a "road trip" to Tennessee with him.
22	6	"The Source"	Ray McKinnon	Ray McKinnon	August 13, 2015	0.149
Chris, another man who was present at the gathering where Hanna was killed, makes an official confession that he, Trey, George and others raped Hanna but did not kill her. Daggett interviews Trey, who tries to explain the events surrounding George Melton's suicide but is unable to make it look like he did not kill George. Daggett arrests Trey for a murder he did not commit. Tawney tells Teddy that she intends to change the locks on their house after he moves out. Teddy reluctantly agrees to help with this process. Meanwhile Daniel goes on his planned road trip with Janet, visiting his prison, then the beach where he interacts with a young boy, and Janet tells her son he is good with children. After walking into the ocean, Daniel seems to have a vision of Tawney visiting him at death row and them kissing – Tawney is shown waking up immediately after this sequence, implying that she had dreamed their meeting. After breaking up with Jon, Amantha returns to the Holden-Talbot home and encounters Teddy, who has moved back in after splitting with Tawney. The step-siblings bond while playing gin rummy, and Jared later comes home and joins them. Jon visits Foulkes to taunt and condemn him, explaining that he believes Foulkes is corrupt and somehow involved in George Melton's (falsely alleged) murder – during this confrontation he reveals that the statute of limitations on Hanna's rape, but not her murder, has expired – this casts doubt on Chris's confession to the rape and denial of the murder. In the final scene Daniel arrives at his new apartment, and asks Janet to forgive herself then leaves.

=== Season 4 (2016) ===
No. overall	No. in season	Title	Directed by	Written by	Original release date	U.S. viewers (millions)
23	1	"A House Divided"	Patrick Cady	Ray McKinnon	October 26, 2016	0.179
Daniel, living at the New Canaan Project in Nashville, leaves to go to his job at a warehouse. Upon returning home, Daniel listens to a voicemail Janet had left updating him on the family. Daniel attends a group counseling session with his four housemates, led by project leader Avery. Each housemate discusses his progress, and Daniel briefly tells them about his day, not sharing much. In the middle of the night, Daniel sees Jesse, his roommate, sneak out. The next day at work, Daniel is informed by his boss that one of their biggest customers is returning a large order due to an error. Daniel assures him it was not his fault, but his boss orders him and his co-worker to stay until they have refilled the order. Before starting, the lights go out due to a transformer's blowing out. The workers end up taking a break, and Daniel takes a walk and comes upon an artist cooperative, where he meets Chloe. Daniel looks at the various art pieces and becomes emotional. As the lights turn back on, he leaves. Returning home, Avery questions Daniel about Jesse's leaving. Afterward, Daniel's housemates confront him about his lack of interest in talking with other people. The next day, Daniel explains to Avery that he lived in isolation for 20 years, unlike his housemates who were able to socialize while in prison. Daniel feels he has lost his sense of self and truly does not even remember whether he killed Hanna or not. Daniel later revisits the artist cooperative and apologizes to Chloe about the previous day. Daniel returns home, where his housemates invite him to play cards.
24	2	"Yolk"	Kate Woods	Ray McKinnon	November 2, 2016	0.102
Janet, preparing to bake, finds broken eggs and decides to clean out the entire fridge. She later leaves a voicemail for Daniel (from the previous episode). Dagget speaks with Bobby Dean about Trey's getting out of jail on bond. Amantha, now the manager at Thrifty Town, deals with her employees and their work schedule requests. Jon pleads to his boss to let him continue to strengthen Daniel's case, but his boss declines as Daniel took the plea deal and is free. Teddy and Tawney continue trying to repair their marriage and go on a "date" to discuss recent events in their lives. Tawney is working at a nursing home and taking college classes. Driving home, Amantha, while stoned, loses control of her vehicle and veers off the road. She calls Ted, Sr. to pick her up. While waiting, Billy Harris, an old friend from high school, passes by, and they talk. Meanwhile, Jared has taken up camping and is spending the night in a tent. The next morning during breakfast, Ted, Sr. tells Amantha the car repairs will be expensive and not worthwhile. Janet suggests that Amantha move back home temporarily to save money, but she declines the offer. Janet tells Ted she's going to Nashville to visit Daniel. Teddy and Amantha agree to swap living spaces, as Teddy has been frustrated about being around his father all the time. At the supermarket, Janet spots Trey and, while he is away from his shopping cart, breaks all the eggs in his carton and leaves.
25	3	"Bob & Carol & Ted Jr & Alice"	Keith Boak	Ray McKinnon	November 9, 2016	0.126
Avery and Maggie suggest to Daniel that he see a therapist who specializes in post-traumatic stress disorder, due to his long-term isolation, and give him a brochure for a clinical psychologist. Jon returns to Paulie and visits Daggett at the police station to discuss the current state of the investigation and Daggett's motives. Daniel gets a call from Janet, who tells him she will be visiting for a day. In a session with her therapist, Tawney wonders if she should divorce Teddy. Jon leaves a message for Janet telling her he's in town and will visit the house. Billy visits Thifty Town and asks Amantha out for a beer. After closing the store, they end up staying at the store discussing their high school classmates. Amantha receives a call from Jon but doesn't answer it. Teddy signs some paperwork for the apartment and later leaves an awkward message for Tawney, wherein he states: "I love you". Meanwhile, the family gets a call from someone who is interested in buying the tire shop. Daniel attends the party at the artist cooperative and talks with Chloe, who admits to Daniel that she Googled him. Chloe invites Daniel up to her apartment, and he asks what she wants from him. Chloe tells him she's not looking for a partner, but a platonic male friend, and that she is pregnant, but the father is not around. Chloe places Daniel's hand on her belly and thanks him for calming her.
26	4	"Go Ask Roger"	Stephen Gyllenhaal	Ray McKinnon	November 16, 2016	0.116
Amantha goes hunting with Billy in the woods; afterward, they sleep together for the first time. At work, Tawney becomes emotionally attached to Zeke, one of her ailing patients,. Daniel and Chloe drive to the home of a famous musician to pick up art for an auction. They are greeted by Rick, the musician's assistant, who instructs them to lock up before leaving. After wrapping up the artwork, Chloe and Daniel stay at the house and begin talking. Daniel tells Chloe he was advised to see a PTSD specialist. Janet, Ted, Sr. and Teddy meet with Mr. Childers, who represents a national pharmacy chain interested in buying the tire shop property. He says they're willing to offer $650,000 but are also considering two other locations. Jon visits the home of C.J. Pickens, the former sheriff, but Jon is told by Mrs. Pickens that C.J. will not see him. Jon speaks with a woman, named Susan, on the phone who was at the party in the woods the night Hanna died. She tells him they were all brought to the sheriff's office the next morning, maybe a group of 20, while John knows from police records that only seven people were interviewed, not including Chris Nelms. Teddy and Tawney meet for their date night, and Teddy becomes upset when he begins talking about the tire shop offer and how he'll probably not be consulted for the final decision. Tawney admits his anger frightens her, and he leaves. At home, Janet finds Jared in the attic and learns he sold his childhood gift of Furbies online for money. Tawney leaves a voicemail for Teddy, apologizes for not being there for him earlier, and invites him to stop by the house. Teddy listens to the message and cries. Outside a bar, Jon follows Trey and asks him about Chris Nelms. Trey tells him to "go ask Roger" and says if Daniel didn't kill Hanna, Chris did. Chloe drops Daniel off at the New Canaan house, and they briefly kiss. While trying to sleep, Daniel hears his roommate masturbating in bed, reminding of his time in prison, and Daniel curls up in anger.
27	5	"Pineapples in Paris"	Scott Teems	Scott Teems & Coleman Herbert	November 23, 2016	0.154
Janet and Ted drive to Nashville to visit Daniel. On the way there, Janet says she wants to sell the tire shop, while Ted is still uncertain. Teddy visits Tawney at home and tells her of the official offer on the tire shop. He later gently asks her for a divorce, and she agrees. At group therapy, Daniel explodes in anger when trying to deal with the problem with his roommate, Manny. The other housemates agree that Manny should respect his roommate. Bobby Dean stops by the Talbot home and tells Teddy that he grew close with George Melton after Hanna's death, but George eventually stopped coming by, because "Trey went back". Bobby asks Teddy to apologize to Daniel for assaulting him at Hanna's grave (which sent Daniel to the hospital). Sheriff Daggett invites Jon over to his home, and after Jon asking why he's there, Daggett steps out for half an hour and encourages him to browse some reading material on the kitchen table. Jon finds the sworn affidavit of Chris Nelms, which he begins to read. Daniel confesses to Chloe that he was sexual assaulted multiple times in prison. She tells him that she can't save him but can hold him, and she hugs him. On the road, Janet accuses Ted of resenting her for years and blames him for never saying a word about it. Ted replies, "And I blame you for never thanking me for it". Tawney goes to work and is told Zeke has fallen unconscious. She sits by his side and cries. Daniel returns to the New Caanan home, and finds Janet and Ted there. Later, Daniel is told by Pickle, another housemate, that he is Daniel's new roommate, delighting Daniel. Teddy returns to Tawney's home to grill a steak outside. Since the doors are locked, he breaks in through the window, setting off the alarm. The alarm code has been changed, but he is able to answer the security questions for the alarm company to turn it off. After eating the steak, he gathers fishing rods, guns, and whiskey, then goes upstairs and stares at what was his and Tawney's bedroom.
28	6	"Physics"	Stephen Gyllenhaal	Coleman Herbert & Scott Teems	November 30, 2016	0.172
Daniel takes out Janet for a day of sightseeing in Nashville. At a cafe, Janet tells Daniel that Rite Aid wants to the buy the tire store, and later Ted apologizes to Daniel for kicking him out of the house. At the Talbot home, Jon tells Amantha about Chris Nelms' deposition, wherein Chris swore that he, George, and Trey raped Hanna. Jon also reveals that he quit his job at Justice Row and plans on filing an ineffective assistance of counsel (IAC) to dismiss Daniel's guilty plea on the grounds Jon was sleeping with his client's sister. At a tourist site, Daniel pleads with his mother to let him go and to be free of him. Janet tells him she won't abandon him. Daniel shows Janet where he works, and Janet reveals that she and Ted might split up. Daniel offers to introduce her to his girlfriend, Chloe, and explains that she is pregnant and plans on moving to Ohio to raise the child. At work, Tawney sits by Zeke's side as he dies. Jon meets with D.A. Person, shares his new evidence, and advises he might file an IAC claim. Tawney drives to Zeke's home and wanders around. The housekeeper, Bonnie, arrives and finds Tawney inside. Bonnie shows Tawney where his plaque is (something Zeke had been asking for), and they talk about Zeke. Daniel, Chloe, and Janet have dinner together at Chloe's apartment. In their motel room, Ted tells Janet he wants to sell the tire store, but only if they give Teddy the inventory. Later, back at Chloe's apartment, she and Daniel have a fight: she encourages Daniel to seek PTSD therapy, but he is worried he'll be unable to deal with what happened to him and says targeted therapy didn't do much for her. Daniel leaves and asks her to send a postcard from Ohio. After a long day at work, Teddy, who started drinking early in the morning, locks up the store and stares at the inflatable tube man outside. He proceeds to shoot at it with his rifle, and one of the bullets ricochets and hits his leg. He calls 911 and waits for an ambulance.
29	7	"Happy Unburdening"	Billy Gierhart	Ray McKinnon & Kate Powers	December 7, 2016	0.112
In therapy, Daniel recounts being gang raped in prison. Janet begins cleaning out the garage with the help of Jared, who is selling some of the items online. Teddy and his father look at a possible new location for the tire shop, but Teddy isn't sure he wants to stay in the tire business. Amantha and Jon meet Bobby Dean, and Bobby apologizes to Amantha for what he did to Daniel, but she doesn't forgive him. Bobby gives a letter from his mother to give to Janet. Tawney visits Teddy at his apartment and she advises him she told Janet about their divorce. After catching up, they agree to eat pizza together, before everything changes. D.A. Person and Sheriff Daggett interview former Sheriff C.J. Pickens at the police station about Hanna's murder. C.J. believes Sen. Foulkes was trying to implicate Daniel for the rape and murder, and he "broke" (confessed) only after they'd interrogated him for 10 hours. C.J. also reveals that Foulkes was friends with Chris Nelms' father, Roger, who was a lawyer, and that Foulkes delayed questioning Chris, hoping Daniel would confess. When he did question Chris, it was in private. Daniel helps Chloe pack for Ohio, though she questions leaving. Daniel tells her he would love for her to stay, but it would not be an ideal situation, given his low-paying job and his probation. They dance to a Harry Nilsson record. Teddy visits the Talbot home and tells his father he and Tawney will be getting a divorce. At Thrifty Town, Amantha is visited by Jenny, her best friend from high school. Amantha apologizes for abandoning their friendship. Jenny admits that she was hurt but understood Amantha was dealing with the tragedy regarding Daniel. Janet washes Ted's back while he bathes, and they tell each other, "I love you". At the New Canaan house, Daniel lies in his bed listening to the recording from his therapy session as a part of prolonged exposure therapy for his PTSD.
30	8	"All I'm Sayin'"	Ray McKinnon	Ray McKinnon	December 14, 2016	0.105
In a flashback to the day Daniel was released from prison, Amantha pleads to Janet to be happy he'll be home, as Amantha feels Janet is incapable of happiness. In the present, Janet apologizes to Amantha for abandoning her over the years; Amantha believes Janet had been clinically depressed. At work, Daniel's boss gives him a 15 cents per hour raise. Sheriff Daggett stops by the tire shop, where Teddy asks if Daggett believes Daniel killed Hanna; Daggett no longer does. Daniel returns to Chloe's apartment and finds she's moved. Preston, who's moving in, tells Daniel that Chloe hates goodbyes, gives Daniel a painting and a book from Chloe, and invites Daniel to visit the loft. Amantha reveals to Jon that she had an epiphany, "Nothing will rectify what's happened. It won't bring back Hanna or my dad or my 18-year-old brother." At group therapy, Daniel expresses his sadness about Chloe's departure. In a therapy session, Daniel revisits when Kerwin was executed. Janet and Jared go to the Deans' house, where Jared talks with Bobby outside, and Janet speaks with Judy in Hanna's room. Judy tells Janet she now believes Daniel is innocent. Jon visits Daniel at the New Canaan house and tells him about D.A. Person's request to opening a GBI investigation. In a flashback to death row, Daniel and Kerwin fantasize about driving around New York City together. Melvin buys the last set of tires at the store before they close for good. Janet, Jared, Tawney, Amantha, and Billy stop by the tire shop to help close up the store. At a televised press conference, D.A. Person announces that the Georgia Bureau of Investigation is opening a new investigation into Hanna's murder, as various Paulie townsfolk watch, including Sen. Foulkes and Chris Nelms. Daggett visits Trey Willis and tells him they're dropping the murder charges against him over George Melton's death. Believing he'll be a suspect in the new investigation, Trey tells Daggett that Hanna fought off Chris Nelms and bit his right hand the night she was raped and murdered, and that Chris hid his injuries at the police station the following day. Trey also says that Chris told him the next morning, "Bitch should have kept her mouth shut and none of this would have happened." The entire Talbot-Holden family enjoys a meal together at home, during which Janet receives a call from Daniel. Teddy reconciles with Daniel, and Tawney says goodbye to Daniel. At the New Canaan house, Daniel lies awake in his bed and fantasizes about reuniting with Chloe and holding her baby.

== Home video release ==
Season	DVD release dates		
Season	Region 1	Region 2	Region 4
1	June 18, 2013	October 12, 2015	March 26, 2014
2	June 2, 2015	January 25, 2016	March 25, 2015
3	September 6, 2016	May 23, 2016	February 17, 2016
4	N/A	N/A	March 15, 2017
