= The Apple Don't Fall Far from the Tree =

Studio album by Lo Carmen & Peter Head
- Released: 13 August 2013
- Studios: Linear Studios, Sydney, Australia
- Genres: Americana; singer-songwriter; alt country; jazz; honkytonk; country soul; piano music; ballads
- Length: 53 mins
- Label: Chiquita Records
- Producers: Lo Carmen; Peter Head

Lo Carmen & Peter Head chronology
The Peach State EP (2012)	The Apple Don't Fall Far from the Tree (2013)	Everyone You Ever Knew (2015)

The Apple Don't Fall Far from the Tree is a collaborative album by Australian singer-songwriter Lo Carmen and her father Peter Head. It was released on Chiquita Records in Australia. It was recorded at Linear Studios over three days in Sydney by Chris Vallejo and Wade Keighran.

The album is a mix of originals and covers of songs by Tom Waits, Peggy Lee, Gram Parsons, Willie Nelson and Patsy Cline, described by The Australian as 'a charming smoky blues romp driven by Head's bar-room piano' and 'an endearing mix of country soul and late night jazz...high on smoky atmosphere' by The Music. Jazzy duet 'Late Bloomer' was co-written by Head and Justine Clarke. Original duet 'Old Hands' explores the life of a musician, 'digging graves and waiting tables to make ends meet' and features a humorous music video by photographer Andrew Cowen featuring actors Terry Serio and Gary Waddell.

They toured with Kinky Friedman and the Handsome Family in Australia in support of the album.

== Track listing ==
1. "Old Hands" (05:15)
2. "Late Bloomer" (03:40)
3. "Songs Don't Care" (03:05)
4. "Johnny Guitar" (03:31)
5. "Love Hurts" (04:17)
6. "Makin' Whoopee" (03:05)
7. "File My Claim" (02:47)
8. "My Sweet Orchard" (03:07)
9. "Xmas Card From a Hooker in Minneapolis" (04:27)
10. "I Love You Honey" (02:48)
11. "Funny How Time Slips Away" (03:23)
12. "Everything Is Everything" (3:38)

== Personnel ==
- Lo Carmen – vocals, parlor guitar, artwork, inside photography
- Peter Head – vocals, piano, organ, vibraphone, guitar
- Jason Walker – pedal steel
- Josh Beagley – 12-string acoustic guitar
- Dan Barnett – trombone
- Bill Twyman – bass
- Greg Henson – drums, percussion

Technical

- Wade Keighran – recording, mixing
- Chris Vallejo – recording, mastering
- Lyndal Irons – front and back cover photography
