= Slight Delay =

Studio album by Loene Carmen
- Released: 19 August 2004
- Recorded: Loose Connections, Darlinghurst, NSW, Australia
- Genre: Alternative Folk
- Length: 51:40
- Label: Chiquita Records
- Producer: Loene Carmen

Loene Carmen chronology
| Born Funky Born Free (2002) | Slight Delay (2004) | Rock'n'Roll Tears (2007) |

Slight Delay is the second album from Australian singer/songwriter Loene Carmen. It was released in 2004 on Chiquita Records through Russell Hopkinson from You Am I's boutique label, Reverberation Records, in Australia. It was recorded in Carmen's home studio, Loose Connections, in Darlinghurst, NSW and features musicians from Australian bands Mess Hall and the Dirty Three.

== Track listing ==
1. "Slight Delay" – 3:10
2. "The Things That Matter" – 5:24
3. "Forget Everything" – 4:13
4. "Little Seed" – 3:25
5. "I Don't Think I Will" – 4:22
6. "Six Strings of Pleasure" – 6:23
7. "No One Knows" – 5:04
8. "Strangely Calm" – 5:24
9. "Just Go Along for the Ride" – 9:23
10. "Time To Go To Bed" – 4:40

== Personnel ==
- Loene Carmen – vocals, guitar, tambourine, beats, chimes, xylophone, organ
- Jed Kurzel – guitar, vocals, harmonica, organ, tambourine
- Warren Ellis – mandolin, violin
- Cathy Green – bass
- Kristyna – guitar
- Aden Young – harmonica

Mixed and mastered by Jorden Brebach

== Reception ==
Despite receiving some excellent reviews, Slight Delay did not make it into the independent charts.

'Loene Carmen has fallen into some lost world where late night country rock is bound up in medieval chains. Mazzy Star springs straight to mind, but the flesh in Carmen's voice and the huge spaces around it bring out other associations as well, most especially the sexy whisperings of Prince and the Rolling Stones at their loose and lazy best' (Mark Mordue)

'Velveteen vocals bubble through a pool of Barbarella's matmos, backlit by Ry Cooder on mescaline, Tortoise-style keys and somnolent beats...Loene Carmen inspires devotion from hardcore bikers to art-house boys. Slight Delay, her second solo album, cements the myth in cherry red lipstick. ...' (PLAN B)
