= Born Funky Born Free =

Studio album by Loene Carmen
- Released: 2002
- Recorded: Loose Connections, Darlinghurst, NSW
- Genre: Singer Songwriter Electronic Alternative rock
- Length: 52:09
- Label: Chiquita
- Producer: Loene Carmen

Loene Carmen chronology
| Born Funky Born Free (2002) | Slight Delay (2004) |

Born Funky Born Free is the debut album from Australian singer/songwriter Loene Carmen. It was independently released in 2002 on Chiquita Records in Australia. It was recorded in Carmen's home studio, Loose Connections, in Darlinghurst, NSW and mixed and mastered at BJB Studios by Chris Townend.

Carmen states this album was inspired by funk pioneer Betty Davis. "I called my first album Born Funky Born Free in some kind of homage to Betty (Davis), and wrote a song from her imagined point of view called My Friends Call Me Foxy. Performing it always makes me stand up a little straighter."

"Mainly it was just me alone with headphones on, in my own little world..."

In 2022 she reflected on the recording process for Talkhouse "I knew I was making a really weird-sounding album that was not likely to find many listeners, but I couldn’t stop. I was in love with it, and with the whole process. It felt like a statement album: This is who I am, if you don’t like the heat, get out of the kitchen. I’d always been a weirdo, I was just letting it all hang out — half girl, half beast. I didn’t even think about trying to find a label to release it; I just got it all ready for release, got quotes from CD printing places, squirreled away what funds I could towards it, and put the rest on a shonky credit card. Once I’d paid it off, I was ready to make the next one."

== Personnel ==
- Loene Carmen - vocals, guitar, organ, beats
- Cathy Green - bass, vocals
- Simon Day - guitar
- James Cruickshank - guitar, organ
- Kristyna - guitar

== Track listing ==
1. "Born Funky Born Free" (3:39)
2. "My Friends Call Me Foxy" (4:24)
3. "Rock On" (4:56)
4. "Half Girl Half Beast" (4:41)
5. "Chiquita Dub" (3:25)
6. "Girl You Feel Alright To Me" (4:47)
7. "The Doctor" (3:48)
8. "I've Got Those Tickets You Wanted" (3:28)
9. "The Green Ray" (4:09)
10. "Gemini" (3:51)
11. "Drag the River" (4:15)
12. "White Wine & Cigarettes (Rest Hard)" (2:42)
13. "How Close Are You?" (4:24)
