= Exile (1994 film) =

1994 film

- DVD cover
- Directed by: Paul Cox
- Written by: Paul Cox
- Based on: Priests Island; 1940 novel by E.L. Grant Watson
- Produced by: Paul Cox; Santhana Naidu; Paul Ammitzboll
- Starring: Aden Young; Beth Champion; Claudia Karvan
- Cinematography: Nino Gaetano Martinetti
- Edited by: Paul Cox
- Music by: Paul Grabowsky
- Production companies: Illumination Films; Film Victoria; Australian Film Finance Corporation
- Distributed by: Beyond International; Roadshow (video)
- Release date: 12 February 1994
- Running time: 95 minutes
- Country: Australia
- Language: English
- Budget: A$2 million

Exile is a 1994 Australian drama film directed by Paul Cox. It was entered into the 44th Berlin International Film Festival. The film was shot entirely on location in Tasmania.

== Plot ==
In the 19th century a young man, Peter, is in love with Jean, but her father refuses to let them marry because he does not have enough money. They plot to steal some sheep but Peter is caught and is exiled to a small island. Jean has to marry another man. She gives birth to Peter's child, but the child dies.

A servant, Mary, arrives on the island. She and Peter become lovers and have a baby. The baby is christened by the village priest.

== Cast ==
- Aden Young as Peter Costello
- Beth Champion as Mary
- Claudia Karvan as Jean
- Norman Kaye as Ghost Priest
- David Field as Timothy Dullach
- Chris Haywood as Village Priest
- Barry Otto as Sheriff Hamilton
- Hugo Weaving as Innes
- Tony Llewellyn-Jones as Jean's Father
- Nicholas Hope as MacKenzie
- Gosia Dobrowolska as Midwife

== Original novel ==
The film is based on a 1940 novel, Priests Island, which was set in Scotland. The Age wrote "The author deals in an idealistic way with primitive conditions of life, and the co-operation of nature with man in providing for his wants. But he also Introduces mystic elements into the story, such as the conversations between Peter Costello and the spirit of the hermit who once lived on the island." The Australasian wrote "Grant Watson's prose approaches poetry at times. His descriptions of the natural life In Priest Island are a Joy. The birds, the flowers, the winds, and the waves all make the story more complete."

== Production ==
Cox relocated the story to Tasmania. "I was overwhelmed by his descriptions of the land," said Cox of the author. "There is a strangeness about his work. It is complex, interesting and very spiritual."

Although an earlier script was written by another writer, Cox wrote the screenplay for the film over eight days while on holiday on a Greek Island. Half the budget was provided by the Film Finance Corporation. According to Cinema Papers, the budget for the movie was AUD$2.0m, but director Paul Cox claimed it was actually AUD$1.5m. It was his largest budget to date.

The film was shot from 15 March to 25 April 1993 on the Freycinet Peninsula on the east coast of Tasmania. Cox:

It's a very religious film. Because of that, it is not very commercial, is not very successful. I think it's a very good film... Exile is about the sea. It's also about society, how it always destroys the individual: that we're not the end product of that society, we're just there to be manipulated and used. It's about a man kicked out of society who really becomes himself. He shines, burns through all the rubbish of the mind and the body. He has to somehow survive physically as well, and he does it quite brilliantly. People even get jealous of him. They ban him and exile him.

Exile had its Australian premiere at the State Cinema, North Hobart which was followed by an audience lead Q&A.

== Reception ==
David Stratton wrote in Variety that "Cox poses a few challenges for his audience. Story is slim, dialogue is minimal, and much time is spent simply exploring the inhospitable coastal terrain. As in "The Nun and the Bandit" the writer/director is interested in the spiritual elements of the piece. Patience is required in the early scenes, and the film clearly isn't for everyone, but gradually it exerts a spell."

== Awards ==
At the 1994 AFI Awards the film won the Samuelson Award for Best Achievement in Cinematography for Nino Gaetano Martinetti, ACS.
