= Cousin Bette (1998 film) =

- Theatrical release poster
- Directed by: Des McAnuff
- Written by: Lynn Siefert; Susan Tarr
- Based on: Cousin Bette by Honoré de Balzac
- Produced by: Sarah Radclyffe
- Starring: Jessica Lange; Elisabeth Shue; Bob Hoskins; Hugh Laurie; Aden Young; Kelly Macdonald; Geraldine Chaplin
- Cinematography: Andrzej Sekuła
- Edited by: Tariq Anwar; Barry Alexander Brown
- Music by: Simon Boswell
- Distributed by: Fox Searchlight Pictures
- Release date: June 12, 1998
- Running time: 108 minutes
- Countries: United Kingdom; United States
- Box office: $1.1 million

Cousin Bette is a 1998 British–American comedy-drama film starring Jessica Lange in the title role and is loosely based on the novel of the same name by the French author Honoré de Balzac.

== Plot ==
The aristocratic Hulot family gathers at the deathbed of their matron Adeline. Adeline's husband, the Baron Hector Hulot, has squandered their fortune on an extravagant string of mistresses and plunged them heavily into debt, a fact which stresses the entire family.

Adeline's Cousin Bette, a poor and aging spinster, has spent her life supporting Adeline and her family with little return, and promises the dying Adeline that she will watch over the family, especially Adeline's young, unmarried daughter, Hortense. Because they were poor as children, their family chose to sacrifice Bette and launch only Adeline into an advantageous marriage due to her greater beauty, a fact which has caused Bette much hardship and regret in life.

Believing the death of Adeline to result in reward at last, Bette is stricken and infuriated when what she believes to be a proposal of marriage and an offer of a true place in the family from Baron Hulot is, in fact, an offer of employment to work as their (unpaid) housekeeper.

Bette returns to her humble apartment and continues her meager living as the costume maker for a Burlesque theater, where she becomes friends with the headliner of the show, the famed courtesan (and Baron Hulot's mistress) Jenny Cadine, and saves the life of a young sculptor living in her building, the displaced and impoverished Count Wenceslas Steinbach. Bette dotes on Wenceslas, giving him money, attention, and guidance. Under Bette's controlling eye, the lackadaisical young artist grows more successful and productive. Finding joy in her new companion, Bette tells her niece, Hortense, of her "sweetheart" Wenceslas and of her happiness.

Hortense, parched from a steady stream of ugly, dull, but wealthy, suitors, is intrigued by her aunt's romantic stories of the handsome artist who happens to be a lord and decides to hunt him down in secret and steal him away from her aunt for an affair. Preferring youth and beauty, the pair marry and Wenceslas accepts a prestigious art commission that would guarantee his major debut — if successful.

Bette views the theft of Wenceslas, whom she loved, as the final betrayal and vows revenge. Enlisting the aid of Jenny, Bette begins to manipulate the Hulot family into succumbing to their baser desires and court their own demises.

One after the other, they fall into ruin under a combination of their family's precarious finances and Bette's subtle guidance. Wenceslas, creatively blocked, is disgraced when it's revealed that he squandered the entire art commission and produced a barely sculpted block of marble. Jenny Cadine seduces Wenceslas, ruining his own marriage and embroiling him in a triangle with Jenny's other lover, Baron Hulot. Upon learning of Jenny's affair with Wenceslas, Hulot suffers a debilitating stroke. Hortense, also learning of the infidelity, attempts to murder Jenny, only to kill her husband instead, and finds herself in prison. Victorin, the Baron's son, had been enabling his father's extravagant lifestyle by borrowing huge sums from ruthless loan sharks. With no way to make good on his debts, Victorin flees for his life.

As fighting breaks out in Paris, and the crack of gunfire becomes heard in streets, the Hulot's bleak fate is revealed. With Wenceslas dead, the Baron crippled, Hortense in prison, and Victorin in hiding, the family name is in shamed and impoverished tatters, their once-proud home all but shuttered.

In contrast to the rest of the family, Bette ends the film successfully and triumphant. She has amassed a small fortune and is now in control of the Hulot family's infant heir, whom she will raise as her own to be a great artist who returns her love.

== Cast ==
- Jessica Lange – Cousin Bette
- Elisabeth Shue – Jenny Cadine
- Kelly Macdonald – Hortense
- Aden Young – Wenceslas
- Hugh Laurie – Baron Hector Hulot
- Bob Hoskins – Cesar Crevel
- Geraldine Chaplin – Adeline Hulot
- Toby Jones – Gentleman in Café des Artistes
- Laura Fraser – Mariette
- Toby Stephens – Victorin Hulot

== Production ==
The film had been announced back in 1995 as part of the first slate of the newly formed Fox Searchlight Pictures. Christopher Menaul was initially attached to direct.

== Reception ==
Cousin Bette received mixed reviews from critics and it holds a 41% rating on Rotten Tomatoes based on 22 reviews. Jessica Lange received strong praise for her performance. Stephen Holden of The New York Times referred to the film as "it feels as rushed, overstuffed and devoid of texture".
