= Rock'n'Roll Tears =

Studio album by Loene Carmen
- Released: 20 August 2007
- Recorded: Colo River, New South Wales, Australia
- Genre: Americana, Singer-Songwriter, Rock
- Length: 54:03
- Label: Shock Records Chiquita Records

Loene Carmen chronology
Slight Delay (2004)	Rock'n'Roll Tears (2007)	It Walks Like Love (2009)

Rock'n'Roll Tears is the third album from Australian singer/songwriter Loene Carmen. It was released on 25 August 2007 on Chiquita Records through Shock Records in Australia.

The album was recorded in 3 days on location in a barn in the Colo River, New South Wales, by Jorden Brebach and featured musicians from the Australian bands Mess Hall and The Holy Soul.

Rock 'N' Roll Tears was described in its press release as "an anarchic, loose, dirty, dreamy, heat fuelled love letter to rock 'n' roll".

Following the recording, Loene spent the remainder of 2006 road-testing her songs, touring and performing with Jim White (drummer) in New York, Mick Harvey in Italy and Greece, and Warren Ellis and Beasts of Bourbon in France. followed by an Australian tour after its release, with Gareth Liddiard.

Aden Young directed a 'Paris Texas' inspired video for lead single 'Nashville High'.

== Personnel ==
- Loene Carmen - vocals/guitar
- Jed Kurzel - guitar/vocals
- Sam Worrad - bass
- Paul Dunn - drums
- Jorden Brebach - recorded and mixed
- William Bowden - mastered

== Track listing ==
1. "Rock'n'Roll Tears"
2. "Nashville High"
3. "Don't Let Her Slip Away"
4. "Oh Yeah"
5. "Wild Wind"
6. "Dirt & Air"
7. "Everybody (Makes Me Wanna Lie Down)"
8. "Same Coin"
9. "Roman Stockings"
10. "He Calls Me Flames"
11. "Nothin' Else"
12. "The Bee"

== Reception ==
Limited sales and radio airplay in Australia but generally positive critical reception. Something You Said called it 'dirty blues, rock and country, which bursts from the stereo like a bar-room brawl between The Velvet Underground, Mazzy Star and The Jesus and Mary Chain...Loene Carmen has once again proved with the pleasingly lo-fi Rock ‘n’ Roll Tears that she is an intelligent, candid songwriter with a voice so seductive that you'd rip your own heart out and hand it to her if she asked you to. Irresistible stuff.' while The Dwarf called it 'an impeccably well orchestrated collection of moody, classic rock and roll pieces'.
