= The Peach State EP =

Studio album by Lo Carmen
- Released: 13 November 2012
- Studio: Butcher Shoppe (Nashville, Tennessee)
- Genre: Americana; singer-songwriter; alternative country; folk; indie rock
- Length: 22:20
- Label: Chiquita Records
- Producer: Lo Carmen

Lo Carmen chronology
It Walks Like Love (2009)	The Peach State EP (2012)	The Apple Don't Fall Far from the Tree (2013)

The Peach State EP is a solo acoustic studio recording by Australian singer/songwriter Lo Carmen featuring songs written in Georgia, USA during a heatwave, performed on 'an abandoned, battered old Stella parlor guitar found buried between toasters and chairs in a Goodwill on the highway for the grand sum of $4.94'. David R. Ferguson, a.k.a. 'Ferg', is well known for engineering the seminal Johnny Cash American Recordings. He co-owns the Butcher Shoppe with John Prine.

== Track listing ==
1. "The Peach State" 03:27
2. "Who Told You Butter Was Evil?" 03:05
3. "Lonesome Beauty" 02:18
4. "I Must Be Seein' Things" 03:14
5. "Black Tambourine" 03:18
6. "Doorways" (bonus track) 06:40

== Reception ==
The EP received limited media coverage and radio airplay.

“...stark country-soul and shimmering blues ...a direct line to the heart that showcases her glorious voice " No Depression

'The spareness of the sound has an authenticity, sincerity and purity of purpose that harks back to the likes of Woody Guthrie. This is folk music. Or country, real country, before that moniker meant chart-topping pseudo-rock that’s had the soul sucked out of it, so it’s but a desiccated skeleton. Carmen is the mistress of evocation. Perhaps it’s her sense of the cinematic that enables her to suggest pictures worth a thousand, from precious few words. And make each and every album a discrete episode in her musical life, with its own distinct atmosphere' Something You Said

== Personnel ==
- Lo Carmen – vocals/guitar
- David Ferguson – engineer/mixing
