= In the Key of Night =

Studio album by Peter Head
- Released: 2004
- Studio: Big Beat Studios, New South Wales
- Genre: Blues
- Length: 52:09
- Label: Big Beat
- Producer: David Cafe and Bob Burns

In The Key Of Night is a solo piano/voice album by Australian pianist Peter Head. It was released in 2004 and was recorded to capture the classic feel of Head's late night piano bar shows, at the request of Big Beat Music. It features Head's interpretation of songs by Ray Charles, Tom Waits, Randy Newman and Gram Parsons, alongside his original tunes.

It was recorded in the Big Beat Studio in Kangaroo Valley, New South Wales, on a Yamaha Grand and a Laffargue upright piano.

== Track listing ==
1. "I Don't Believe" (2:41) (Peter Head)
2. "Last Night I Had A Dream" (2:30) (Randy Newman)
3. "Everything is Everything" (3:27) (Peter Head)
4. "Since I Met You Baby" (3:44) (Ivory Joe Hunter)
5. "Make You Feel My Love" (3:26) (Bob Dylan)
6. "Crying Time" (3:24) (Buck Owens)
7. "I Wish I Was in New Orleans" (3:29)
8. "Cry Me a River" (4:55) (Arthur Hamilton)
9. "Saving All My Love For You" (3:02) (Tom Waits)
10. "Sin City" (3:52) (Gram Parsons and Chris Hillman)
11. "You Don't Know Me" (4:19) (Cindy Walker and Eddy Arnold)
12. "I Wish I Was Stoned" (3:17) Peter Head

== Liner notes ==
If you've ever lived and loved the night life, chances are, at some stage during your carousing, cruising, boozing and late night losing, you'd have come across Peter Head. His self-penned sublime songs and lyrics tell tales tall and true about Australia's crooks, hookers, pimps and thieves.

Head's night time netherworld of ivory tickling in smoke-filled rooms, singing wayward songs about wayward people, is unique in Australia, our very own musical journeyman; always outside the crap and corruption of the music industry, always laying down a magical rolling chord, a riff, a poignant lyric, a primal-honed voice - frayed at the edges as it is, rasping, growling, crackling, and about as soulful as it gets.

Try listening to his self-penned opening song I Don't Believe, for instance, without shedding a tear - or if you think you're real tough, without almost shedding a tear. Head is a bona fide musical gem, a fixture in the late night bars of Sydney since 1980, his presence sighted in New York's after hours piano bars more than a decade ago. A magnet to discerning music lovers, a sanctuary to others, Peter Head is the one who showed Bon Scott how to write and structure songs and play guitar. He and his 70s rock outfit, Headband, supported Elton John and the Rolling Stones and he's since provided backing, musical arrangements, and supportive morale to hundreds of the country's finest singers and musicians - far too many to mention here.

This excellent set, beautifully recorded with passion and empathy by the adventurous Big Beat Music label shows Peter Head in his best light yet, highlighting his splendid songs like I Don't Believe and Everything Is Everything.

Head's fresh interpretations of songs from a few of his heroes like Tom Waits, Randy Newman and Ray Charles are not only commendable, but demonstrate the uniqueness of his voice and his very original phrasing. Not to mention his world class piano playing. A master.

So slip into relax mode, friend, take a drag and pour a stiff one, lay back and soak up one of Australia's very real musical greats. Vincent Lovegrove
