= Wedgewood stove =

American stove brand

James Graham Manufacturing Company
- Company type: Defunct
- Industry: Appliance
- Founded: 1882
- Fate: closed down: early 1970s (approx.)
- Headquarters: Newark, California, United States
- Products: gas ranges, electric ranges, built-in gas cooktops and ovens

The Wedgewood stove was manufactured in Newark, California, originally by the James Graham Manufacturing Company and later as a division of Rheem. Gas ranges and stand-alone ovens marketed under the Wedgewood brand were particularly popular in the Western United States in the early and middle of the 20th Century.

== History ==
James Graham immigrated to the San Francisco Bay Area from Canada in 1877. Following several years of employment at ironworks operations, Graham founded his own company in 1882, selling an early version of the Wedgewood stove. Following his death in 1902, his sons took over, eventually employing over 400 people at its Newark factory. The company also had sales operations in Seattle and Los Angeles, leading Wedgewood to become one of the best known stoves in the Western United States in the early 20th Century.

In 1951, Rheem purchased the James Graham Manufacturing Company. The ranges were then sold under the Rheem Wedgewood brand. Rheem then purchased stovemaker Western Holly in 1956. Some stoves were also sold under the Wedgewood-Holly brand, but by the early 1970s the brand ceased to exist.

== See also ==
- List of stoves
