= It Walks Like Love =

Studio album by Loene Carmen
- Released: 12 May 2009
- Recorded: BJB Studios, Sydney, Australia
- Genre: Americana; singer-songwriter; alternative country; rock
- Length: 42:07
- Label: Inertia Records; Chiquita Records
- Producer: Burke Reid; Loene Carmen

Loene Carmen chronology
Rock'n'Roll Tears (2007)	It Walks Like Love (2009)	The Peach State EP (2012)

It Walks Like Love is the fourth album from Australian singer-songwriter Loene Carmen. It was released on 12 May 2009 on Chiquita Records through Inertia Records in Australia. It was recorded at Big Jesus Burger Studios in Sydney by Burke Reid and features musicians from Australian bands The Holy Soul and The Scare, and a duet with Jed Kurzel from the Mess Hall.

Australian artist James Powditch created a mixed media artwork inspired by the album for the Archibald Prize entitled 'She Walks Like Love'.

Carmen previewed the album in a solo showcase at SxSW 2009. and undertook limited tours in Australia with Mick Turner and Gareth Liddiard

== Track listing ==
1. "Rugged Love & Thin Air" (3:38)
2. "Oh Apollo!" (2:58)
3. "Mimic The Rain" (4:19)
4. "Gauloises Blue" (4:36)
5. "Cheap Glue" (4:08)
6. "Flames vs Lightning" (4:37)
7. "Another Man" (5:06)
8. "Thirty Records" (5:06)
9. "Devil's Lullabye" (4:42)
10. "Sunday Night" (3:40)

== Personnel ==
- Loene Carmen – vocals, guitar
- Sam Worrad – bass
- Sam Pearton – drums
- Brock J Fitzgerald – guitar

with:

- Jed Kurzel – guitar and vocals on "Oh Apollo!"
- Peter Head – piano on "Gauloises Blue" and "Devil's Lullaby"
- Tex Perkins – background vocals on "Gauloises Blue"
- Holiday Sidewinder – background vocals and tambourine on "Gauloises Blue" and "Oh Apollo!"
- Kristyna – background vocals on "Gauloises Blue"
- Wade Keighran – background vocals and tambourine on "Mimic the Rain"

== Reception ==
Single 'Mimic The Rain' received limited radio airplay and the album had a generally positive reception.

Faster Louder said 'Carmen's voice saunters all silk and smoke...a magnetically absorbing album' and Alt Media called it 'her best work to date'. Inpress stated ‘It's always been about the voice...beauty and danger, knowing and innocence, sex and longing, and love, both sacred and profane... Loene Carmen's individual mix of torch blues, gothic country, with occasional outbreaks of smoky nightclub has seduced many who hear it. ..She sings it, you believe her. And that's enough’ while J Mag described it as 'a sun-bleached, neon-soaked dusty road trip, stopping at every sleazy smoky roadhouse, cheap hotel and dirty diner on the way'.
