= Wade Keighran =

Wade Keighran (born 1 August 1984) is an Australian rock musician, songwriter, audio engineer and record producer currently based in Sydney. He started his career playing guitar in punk band Taking Sides, was the bass player and co-songwriter with The Scare and is currently writing and playing bass for Wolf & Cub. Keighran has also appeared live as bass player with Jack Ladder, Steve Smythe and Hunter Dienna.

== Musical career ==
=== Taking Sides (2003–2005) ===
At age 18 Keighran formed Taking Sides in Sydney with other founding members Ricky Taylor and Brett "BxE" Eberhard. In 2004 they released an E.P Smash the Windows to the Dead Hearts and then in 2005 after recruiting Toe to Toe drummer Ben "mook" Mukenschnabl, released their full-length album Dresscode on Resist Records on which Keighran played all guitars, bass, backing vocals and co-wrote lyrics. After touring the country with a list of local and international bands such as Give up the Ghost, The Hope Conspiracy, Miles Away and Parkway Drive Keighran decided to leave the band when offered a position as bass player for Queensland band The Scare.

=== The Scare (2005–2010) ===
While on tour with Taking Sides in August 2005, in Queensland, Keighran was asked by The Scare, who were relocating to England soon after if he would leave Taking Sides and join them, to which he subsequently said yes. That year The Scare released the 'Vacuum irony' E.P through O.K.Relax which although credits Keighran as the bass player, he did not play on.
In February 2006 The Scare relocated to Birmingham in England to begin touring and writing for their debut album Chivalry which was released in September, 2007 through EMI, marking Keighran's first official release with the band.
After two years of relentless touring through the U.K, Europe, Sweden and the U.S playing summer festivals such as Reading & Leads, Download and The Big day Out, the band returned home to record their second album with producer Daniel Johns.
OOZEVOODOO, also through EMI was released in 2009 and upon completion of the album the band went out on three national tours of Australia, had huge support and high rotation on JJJ and played the Australian summer festivals Falls Festival, Homebake and again [Big_Day_Out| The Big day Out].
In mid-2010 the band announced they were mutually disbanding and moving on to other individual projects. They played their last Sydney show to a sold-out crowd at the Annandale Hotel and their last show ever in Brisbane on 9 August 2010.

=== Wolf & Cub (2010–present) ===
In 2010 after the collapse of The Scare, Wade joined Adelaides Wolf & Cub. Although he has toured with the band and is co-writing songs with singer/lead guitarist Joel Byrne, no new material has been released. According to Mess & Noise, as of June 2011 the band were in the recording studio tracking as yet unreleased songs.
On the bands blogspot frontman Joel Byrne Said:
" I could go on and on about how excited we are about this but Wade already knows how we feel about him joining the band so I won’t try and justify our excitement any further. I will say this though, it was hard to see a future for the band when Tommy left but having Wade has made us rethink that outlook considerably."

=== Production work & side projects ===
- In 2008/2010 while The Scare was on a break between tours Keighran contributed to many other musical projects including backing vocals/percussion on Loene Carmen's album It Walks Like Love.
- That year he also joined with ex Transvision Vamp singer, Wendy James to play bass on the track Speed Ball taken from her album I Came Here to Blow Minds.
- During this period Keighran was the live bass player for travelling minstrel/singer/songwriter, Jack Ladder and also Australian Blues musician, Steve Smythe whom he also provided bass duties for on an as yet unreleased album.
- Towards the end of 2008 Keighran began to work with Sydney two-piece Hunter Dienna and co-wrote their self-titled E.P. Recorded at Atlantis sound in Melbourne, the 4 song E.P was co-produced by Wade and Mick Harvey, the renowned guitarist from The Birthday Party and Nick Cave & the Bad Seeds. As a four piece now, Hunter Dienna were invited to perform at the festival in Australia in early 2009 curated by Nick Cave & the Bad Seeds.
- Keighran is credited as the "Producer/2nd Engineer" on two tracks by Sydney band The Dark Bells in 2011
- In January 2011 he produced and engineered "This Must be the Place", a single for Melbourne band The Dead Leaves which is a cover of a Talking Heads song of the same name. He is also credited as the assistant engineer on their forthcoming album Cities on the Sea.
- In May and August of 2015 Keighran engineered, mixed & co-produced "Friday Night Heroes", the 5th album for Sydney/Wollongong based rock band Leadfinger at Linear Recording Studio in Leichardt, NSW. He also contributed some backing vocals and percussion to a few tracks on the album.
