= Rectify =

2013–2016 American television series

- Genre: Tragedy; Legal drama Southern Gothic
- Created by: Ray McKinnon
- Starring: Aden Young; Abigail Spencer; J. Smith-Cameron; Adelaide Clemens; Clayne Crawford; Luke Kirby; Bruce McKinnon; Jake Austin Walker; J. D. Evermore
- Opening theme: "Bowsprit" by Balmorhea
- Composer: Gabriel Mann
- Country of origin: United States
- Original language: English
- No. of seasons: 4
- No. of episodes: 30 (list of episodes)

Production
- Executive producers: Ray McKinnon; Melissa Bernstein; Mark Johnson
- Producer: Don Kurt
- Production location: Georgia
- Running time: 43–68 minutes
- Production companies: Gran Via Productions; Zip Works

Original release
- Network: Sundance TV
- Release: April 22, 2013 – December 14, 2016

Rectify is an American television Southern Gothic drama series exploring the life of a man who is released from prison after nearly 20 years on death row when his conviction is overturned. It was created by Ray McKinnon and is the first original series from Sundance TV. It stars Aden Young, Abigail Spencer, J. Smith-Cameron, Adelaide Clemens, Clayne Crawford, and Luke Kirby, and premiered on April 22, 2013, with a first season run of six episodes.

A second season of ten episodes, premiered on June 19, 2014. A third season of six episodes premiered on July 9, 2015. A fourth and final season of eight episodes premiered on October 26, 2016. Praised for its authentic Southern culture-based storytelling, all four seasons of the show have been critically acclaimed.

== Synopsis ==
Daniel Holden was imprisoned as a teenager for the rape and murder of his 16-year-old girlfriend, Hanna. After nineteen years on death row, analysis of DNA evidence from his trial contradicts the prosecution's case, and an appeals court vacates the judgment of his original trial.

Daniel is allowed to return to his hometown, Paulie, Georgia. The subsequent adjustments and events in the lives of Daniel, his extended family, and the townsfolk are explored as a character study in a slowly unfolding Southern Gothic story.

== Cast and characters ==
=== Main cast ===
- Aden Young as Daniel Holden, convicted for the rape and strangulation murder of his teenage girlfriend Hanna but decades later released from prison after the discovery of conflicting DNA evidence
- Abigail Spencer as Amantha Holden, Daniel's younger sister, who has always believed in his innocence
- J. Smith-Cameron as Janet Talbot, Daniel's mother, who remarried after his father died
- Adelaide Clemens as Tawney Talbot, Teddy's wife; she is a deeply religious young woman. She is sister-in-law to Daniel, Amantha, and Jared
- Clayne Crawford as Ted "Teddy" Talbot Jr., Daniel's stepbrother and Tawney's husband. His father Ted Sr. married Daniel's mother after Daniel's father died.
- Luke Kirby as Jon Stern, Daniel's new lawyer. He did not defend Daniel in the rape and murder trial but helped gain his release. He is in a relationship with Daniel's sister.
- Bruce McKinnon as Ted Talbot Sr. (recurring season 1, main seasons 2–4), Daniel's stepfather. He worked at the tire store owned by Daniel's father, taking over its management after the man's death. The store is owned by Janet Talbot.
- Jake Austin Walker as Jared Talbot (recurring season 1, main seasons 2–4), Ted Jr., Daniel and Amantha's younger half-brother
- J. D. Evermore as Carl Daggett (recurring seasons 1–3, main season 4), a local sheriff

=== Recurring cast ===
- Michael O'Neill as Senator Roland Foulkes, who was the prosecutor who convicted Daniel. He was elected as State Senator in the aftermath.
- Sean Bridgers as Trey Willis, one of the original "witnesses" to Daniel's crime
- Sharon Conley as Sondra Person, a district attorney
- Robin Mullins as Judy Dean, Hanna Dean's mother
- Linds Edwards as Bobby Dean, Hanna's brother
- John Boyd West as Melvin, manager of Amantha's apartment complex and a friend of Daniel's
- Kim Wall as Marcy, a waitress at a local restaurant
- Johnny Ray Gill as Kerwin Whitman (seasons 1–2, 4), a death row inmate and Daniel's friend
- Michael Traynor as George Melton (seasons 1–2), another witness to Daniel's crime
- Jayson Warner Smith as Wendall Jelks (seasons 1–2), a death row inmate who antagonizes Daniel and Kerwin
- Stuart Greer as Lid Comphrey (seasons 2–3), Sheriff Daggett's partner
- Ashley LeConte Campbell as Wynn Lovaas (seasons 2–3), the manager at Thrifty Town, where Amantha works
- Melinda Page Hamilton as Rebecca (seasons 3–4), therapist for Teddy and Tawney
- Caitlin FitzGerald as Chloe (season 4), an artist whom Daniel befriends in Nashville
- Nathan Darrow as Billy Harris (season 4), an old friend from high school and romantic interest for Amantha
- David Dean Bottrell as Dr. Milch (season 4), Daniel's PTSD therapist
- Markice Moore as Tyrus (season 4)

== Episodes ==
Season	Episodes	Originally released	
Season	Episodes	First released	Last released
1	6	April 22, 2013	May 20, 2013
2	10	June 19, 2014	August 21, 2014
3	6	July 9, 2015	August 13, 2015
4	8	October 26, 2016	December 14, 2016

== Development and production ==
The series began development in 2008 when it was planned to air on AMC with Walton Goggins set to play the lead role. Three years after originally being developed at AMC, sister channel Sundance TV announced it had ordered the series for six episodes, to become the channel's first original scripted series. Production for the second season began on February 3, 2014, in Griffin, Georgia. Production began on the fourth and final season in April 2016.

=== Casting ===
In April 2012, Abigail Spencer, Clayne Crawford, Adelaide Clemens, Jonah Lotan, and J. Smith-Cameron were all cast in the series. Aden Young was cast as the series lead in May 2012. Luke Kirby was cast in June 2012, replacing Lotan as Daniel Holden's lawyer.

== Reception ==
=== Critical response ===
Critical response of Rectify
Season	Rotten Tomatoes	Metacritic
1	88% (33 reviews)	82 (28 reviews)
2	96% (23 reviews)	92 (16 reviews)
3	100% (20 reviews)	89 (11 reviews)
4	100% (20 reviews)	99 (11 reviews)

==== Season 1 ====
The first season of Rectify received critical acclaim, scoring a Metacritic rating of 82 out of 100 based on 28 reviews. One of the positive reviews of Rectify was from the Los Angeles Times, which called the series "mesmerizing." A less positive review in The New York Times noted the slow pace of the series after the first episode and a quarter. Review aggregator Rotten Tomatoes gave the first season a rating of 88% based on 33 reviews, with an average rating of 8.4 out of 10, with the critical consensus: "Rectify is a stylish drama that rewards patient viewers with deep characters and plotlines."

==== Season 2 ====
The second season continued to receive critical acclaim, with a Metacritic rating of 92 out of 100 based on 16 reviews. Rotten Tomatoes gave the second season a 96% rating, based on 23 reviews with an average rating of 9 out of 10 and the critical consensus: "Its scenic landscapes and rewarding slow burn prove Rectify's second season to be just as good, if not better, than the first." Tim Goodman of The Hollywood Reporter wrote that "it remains as riveting and unique as ever."

==== Season 3 ====
The third season also received critical acclaim with a Metacritic rating of 89 out of 100 based on 11 reviews. Rotten Tomatoes gave the third season a 100% rating, based on 20 reviews with an average rating of 8.3 out of 10 and the critical consensus: "Rectify's subtlety draws viewers in deeper during season three – and they continue to be rewarded with quality acting, compelling dialogue, and thought-provoking drama." Jeff Jensen of Entertainment Weekly wrote, "It's rich with beautifully crafted scenes that capture the distance, anger, and confusion of a fragmenting family and souls in flux." Brian Lowry of Variety wrote, "Rectify remains a master class in nuance — in small looks and long pauses that say more than pages of dialogue."

==== Season 4 ====
The fourth and final season received universal acclaim with a Metacritic rating of 99 out of 100 based on 11 reviews, making it the highest-rated season of a television series on the website. Rotten Tomatoes gave the fourth season a 100% rating, based on 20 reviews with an average rating of 9.6 out of 10 and the critical consensus: "In its final season, Rectify endures as a vital and compelling drama, poignantly driven by a narrative that envelops its characters in complexity, humanity, and a bittersweet beauty." Matt Roush of TV Guide called Rectify "One of TV's truest, finest and deepest dives into pure character drama." Malcolm Jones of The Daily Beast wrote that "Rectify is the best series I have ever seen on television. Not may be. Not might be. It just is."

Damien Echols, who as one of the West Memphis 3 was convicted and served nearly two decades in prison before being released in part based on DNA evidence, wrote about the series in The Huffington Post: "Rectify is the story of a man who was sentenced to death for a crime he didn't commit, and spent 19 years on death row before getting out. Much like my own real life case, the local politicians refuse to admit he's innocent even after DNA testing points towards someone else. In fact, there was so much about this show that mirrored my own life I began to wonder how much of my story had crept into the script." And, "I can tell you from first hand experience that Rectify is a very realistic show."

Critics' top ten lists

2013
- 4th – HitFix (Daniel Fienberg)
- 4th – TV.com (Tim Surette)
- 5th – Filmmaker (Dan Schoenbrun)
- 6th – TV Guide (Matt Roush)
- 6th – Los Angeles Times (Mary McNamara)
- 7th – Philadelphia Daily News (Ellen Gray)
- 7th – Time (James Poniewozik)
- 9th – The Salt Lake Tribune (Scott D. Pierce)
- – The Huffington Post (Maureen Ryan)
- – RedEye (Curt Wagner)

2014
- 2nd – Entertainment Weekly (Jeff Jensen and Melissa Maerz)
- 4th – Vox (Emily St. James)
- 5th – TV.com (Tim Surette)
- 5th – TV.com (Kaitlin Thomas)
- 6th – HitFix (Daniel Fienberg)
- 7th – HitFix (Alan Sepinwall)
- 9th – IGN (Matt Fowler)
- – The Globe and Mail (John Doyle)
- – The Huffington Post (Maureen Ryan)
- – ScreenCrush (Ryan McGee)

2015
- 2nd – Philadelphia Daily News (Ellen Gray)
- 6th – Vulture (Matt Zoller Seitz)
- 8th – The Hollywood Reporter (Tim Goodman)
- 9th – Indiewire (Ben Travers)
- 10th – Adweek (Jason Lynch)
- 10th – Entertainment Weekly (Jeff Jensen)
- 10th – HitFix (Alan Sepinwall)
- – National Post (David Berry)
- – The New York Times (James Poniewozik)
- – Variety (Brian Lowry)
- – Variety (Maureen Ryan)

2016
- 1st – Flavorwire (Lara Zarum)
- 2nd – The Hollywood Reporter (Daniel Fienberg)
- 2nd – RogerEbert.com (Brian Tallerico)
- 2nd – Variety (Maureen Ryan)
- 5th – CinemaBlend (Nick Venable)
- 5th – Uproxx (Alan Sepinwall)
- 6th – Filmmaker Magazine (Dan Schoenbrun)
- 6th – TV Guide
- 7th – Collider (Allison Keene)
- 7th – Entertainment Weekly (Jeff Jensen)
- 7th – The Hollywood Reporter (Tim Goodman)
- 7th – Vox (Emily St. James)
- 8th – Adweek (Jason Lynch)
- 8th – Indiewire (Ben Travers, Hanh Nguyen, Liz Shannon Miller)
- 8th – Vulture (Matt Zoller Seitz)
- – CNN (Brian Lowry)
- – The Globe and Mail (John Doyle)
- – The New York Times (James Poniewozik)
- – Philadelphia Daily News (Ellen Gray)
- – Yahoo! (Ken Tucker)

=== Accolades ===
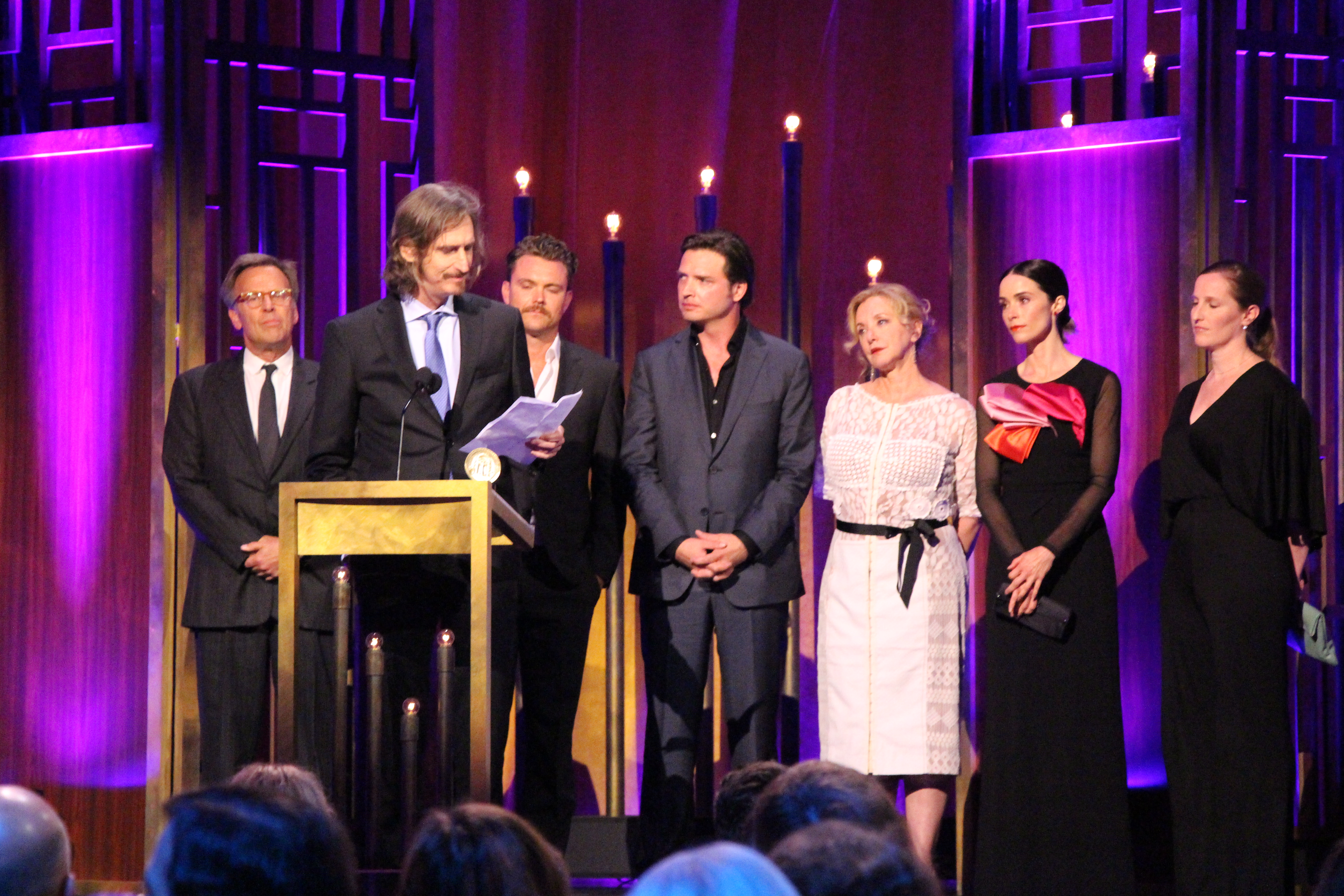
Ray McKinnon, along with Mark Johnson, Clayne Crawford, Aden Young, J. Smith-Cameron, Abigail Spencer and Melissa Bernstein, accept the Peabody Award for Rectify.

Abigail Spencer was nominated for the Critics' Choice Television Award for Best Supporting Actress in a Drama Series in 2013. For the 67th Writers Guild of America Awards, Kate Powers and Ray McKinnon were nominated for Best Episodic Drama for "Donald the Normal". For the 5th Critics' Choice Television Awards, Aden Young was nominated for Best Actor in a Drama Series.

The series was awarded with a 2014 Peabody Award, with the organization stating, "A powerful, subtle dramatic series about a death-row inmate released after nearly two decades thanks to new DNA evidence, it ponders whether what's been lost can ever be repaid, not just to him but to everyone he and his alleged crimes touched."

For the 6th Critics' Choice Television Awards, the series received three nominations, for Best Drama Series, Aden Young for Best Actor in a Drama Series, and Clayne Crawford for Best Supporting Actor in a Drama Series.

== Home media ==
On DVD, the first season was released on June 18, 2013, the second season was released on June 2, 2015, and the third season was released on September 6, 2016. The series was available to stream on Netflix in the United States and Canada until March 2021.
