= Aden Young =

Canadian-Australian actor

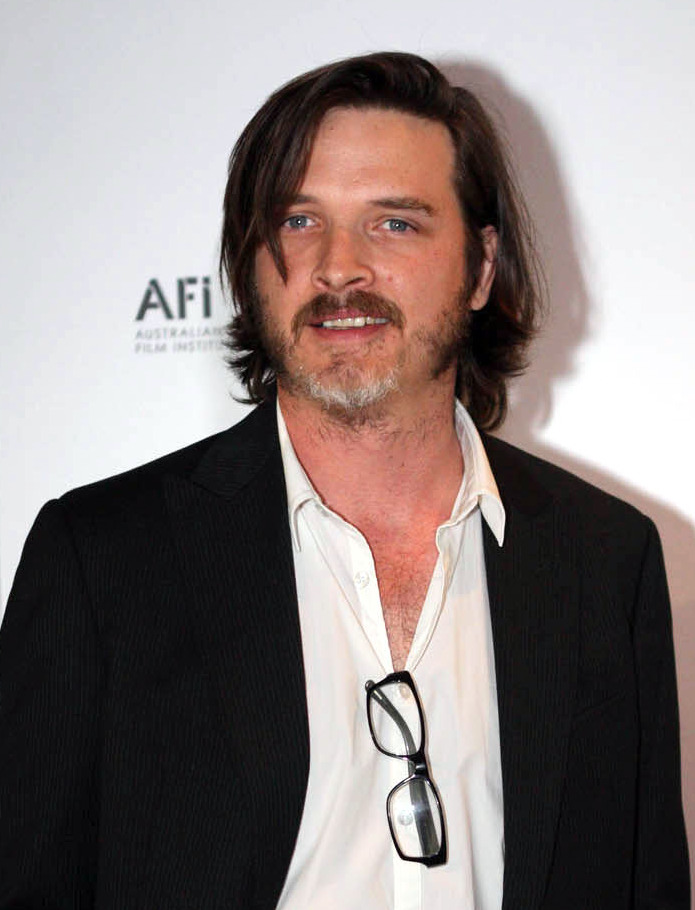
- Young at the 2012 AACTA Awards
- Born: 30 November 1971 (age 54); Toronto, Ontario, Canada
- Occupation: Actor
- Years active: 1991–present
- Spouse: Loene Carmen (m. 2014)
- Children: 2

Aden Young (born 30 November 1971) is a Canadian-Australian actor. He is best known for his portrayal of Daniel Holden in the SundanceTV drama Rectify, for which he was twice nominated for the Critics' Choice Television Award for Best Actor in a Drama Series. He has appeared in American, Canadian and Australian productions and from 2024–26, he performed the lead role of Det. Henry Graff in Law & Order Toronto: Criminal Intent.

== Early life ==
Young was born in Toronto, Ontario, Canada. His father Chip Young, an American born in Missouri, was a well-known CBC broadcaster and children's book author, as well as composer of Canadian classic 'Honky The Christmas Goose', while his mother is a nurse from Newcastle, Australia. His family left Toronto for Australia in 1981. Young attended Galston High and Australian Theatre for Young People as a teenager.

== Career ==
Young was cast in his first role, as young Frenchman Daniel Davost in Bruce Beresford's religious epic Black Robe (1991) on his 18th birthday. International acclaim followed and Young was dubbed "the next Marlon Brando" in France and "the next Mel Gibson" in Hollywood but returned to Australia to support the local industry and focus on projects that he was more drawn to. He took the lead role in Australian arthouse noir film Broken Highway (1993), directed by pioneering female filmmaker Laurie McInnes, which screened in competition in Cannes but received polarized reviews.

Paul Cox's Exile was filmed soon after, described in Variety as "an ambitious, sometimes hallucinatory drama that tackles themes difficult to bring off successfully in the cinema". Young and Cox clashed dramatically during filming but formed a lifelong friendship that led to Young becoming part of Cox's film family (Chris Haywood explains "Working with Cox is not dissimilar to being one of the Musketeers or part of a pirate crew") editing, appearing and helping out on many Cox productions. Exile screened in competition at Berlin Film Festival, Montreal World Film Festival, Toronto Film Festival and Warsaw Film Festival but did not receive a theatrical release.

Young was nominated for an AACTA Award for Best Actor in a Leading Role at the 1995 Australian Film Institute Awards and won a Film Critics Circle of Australia Best Actor award for his role as the "ratty-looking loser" Psycho Joe opposite Ben Mendelsohn in Metal Skin (1994), Geoffrey Wright's examination of suburban hopelessness and revhead subculture, which screened internationally in competition at Venice Film Festival and Stockholm Film Festival among others. One reviewer wrote that "Young's depiction of this unsettling metamorphosis is central to the film's success." Geoffrey Wright stated "There could be no dispute that he is one of the best actors in the country."

After making Australian films River Street, Cosi, Hotel de Love and Paradise Road in quick succession, Young portrayed a starving Polish sculptor who spurns his lover Jessica Lange in US film Cousin Bette and as slacker desperado Buck in Under Heaven, a modern reworking of Henry James novel The Wings of the Dove.

The early 2000s saw him starring as a traumatized Canadian soldier in War Bride, a German priest in Serenades, and smaller roles in The Crocodile Hunter: Collision Course and a doctor in Cox's Molokai.

In 2004, he signed onto the Sydney Theatre Company production of Hedda Gabler as Cate Blanchett's tortured alcoholic lover Ejlert Lovberg. The production also had a 2006 season at Brooklyn Academy of Music and spawned documentary In the Company of Actors.

Young directed the short film The Rose of Ba Ziz (2007), adapted from a children's book written by his father; the film was made over five days on a shoestring budget of $700 and featured Hugo Weaving, Roy Billing, Odessa Young and an appearance by his significant other, Australian singer Loene Carmen, who also co-composed the film's score with Jed Kurzel. Additionally, Young directed the AFI award-winning 25-minute film The Order (1999).

Film roles followed, in World War I drama Beneath Hill 60 and French film The Tree, as Charlotte Gainsbourg's husband before starring as a besieged father dying from tetanus in the Kriv Stenders period gothic western Dark Frontier aka Lucky Country.

Young reunited with Beresford for Mao's Last Dancer (2009), based on the 2003 best-selling autobiography of Chinese ballet dancer Li Cunxin, playing a Texan oil tycoon. Beresford stated that Young's "a very cooperative and thoughtful actor."

Young mimed the hit song "Even Though I'm A Woman", by the Australian female indie supergroup Seeker Lover Keeper, in the 2011 music video directed by Natalie Van Dungen. He played American techno geek Meier in the Jason Statham/Robert De Niro action film Killer Elite and performed a cameo as Dr Victor Frankenstein in I, Frankenstein.

Young edited Paul Cox documentaries Kalaupapa Heaven Tajiri and feature film Salvation. He also directed Carmen's music videos for "Everyone You Ever Knew (Is Coming Back To Haunt You" (2015) and "Nashville High" (2007) as well as editing her music video "Mimic the Rain" (2009).

In June 2012, Young was announced as the lead character Daniel Holden in the SundanceTV Southern Gothic series Rectify, which follows Holden's journey when he is released back to his family in a small Southern town after 19 years on Death Row for the murder of his girlfriend, following new evidence. His critically acclaimed performance was hailed as "a haunted wonder" with Variety proclaiming "Aden Young's portrait of Daniel is one of the greatest performances to ever grace any screen, without question. It's a travesty he hasn't been nominated for every single acting award in the TV world. The entertainment industry should make up new awards just to give to him." Rectify was announced as a Peabody Award winner in April 2015 and Young has received two Critics Choice Best Actor nominations for Seasons 2 and 3. Rectify was in the 2018 Guinness Book of Records as "Highest Rated TV Series" for its Metacritic rating of 99.

Young played lawyer Stephen Roche in the well received Don't Tell, the true story of a young Queensland woman who sued the church over sexual abuse she suffered at her Anglican school. The film also starred Jack Thompson and Rachel Griffiths. Young was nominated for Best Supporting Actor in the Film Critics Circle of Australia Awards.

In 2017, Young took the lead in Damnation before departing over creative differences.

He played villain Cyrus Mendenhall in Canadian indie drama Angelique's Isle in 2018, and starred in the 2019 romantic comedy Elsewhere.

In 2023, he appeared in Christian Sparkes's thriller drama The King Tide as Beau, a doctor left essentially irrelevant after a child with mystical healing powers turns up in a village.

== Personal life ==
Young has two sons, Dutch (born 2007) and Chester (born 2011), with his wife, Australian singer-songwriter-musician-actress Loene Carmen. They married in Zebulon, Georgia while filming season 2 of Rectify in 2014.

A portrait of Young by artist James Powditch was a 2008 Archibald Prize finalist. Young also appears in Powditch's 2012 work Berserk Warriors.

== Filmography ==
=== As actor ===
==== Film ====
Year	Title	Role	Notes
1991	Black Robe	Daniel	
1992	Over the Hill	Nick	
1993	Sniper	Doug Papich	
1993	Love in Limbo	Barry McJannet	
1993	Broken Highway	Angel	
1993	Shotgun Wedding	Jimmy Becker	
1994	Exile	Peter Costello	
1994	Metal Skin	Joe	
1995	Audacious	Stanley	
1996	Cosi	Nick	
1996	River Street	Ben	
1996	Hotel de Love	Rick Dunne	
1997	Paradise Road	Bill Seary	
1998	Under Heaven	Buck	
1998	Cousin Bette	Count Wenceslas Steinbach	
1999	Molokai: The Story of Father Damien	Dr. Kalewis	
2001	The War Bride	Charlie	
2001	Serenades	Johann	
2002	The Crocodile Hunter: Collision Course	Ron Buckwhiler	
2004	Human Touch	George	
2005	The Bet	Angus	
2007	In the Company of Actors	Himself/Eljert Lovburg	
2007	The Goat That Ate Time	Narrator	Short film; voice only
2007	Flipsical	Unknown	Short film
2008	Salvation	Gloria's Acolyte	
2009	Lucky Country	Nat Doole	
2009	Shot Open	Dodek	Short film
2009	Mao's Last Dancer	Dilworth	
2010	Beneath Hill 60	Major North	
2010	The Tree	Peter	
2010	Kissing Point	Mark Logan	Short film
2011	Killer Elite	Meier	
2013	Final Recipe	Sean	
2014	I, Frankenstein	Dr. Victor Frankenstein	
2014	Frontera	Sheriff Randall Hunt	
2016	The Unseen	Bob Longmore	
2017	Don't Tell	Stephen Roche	
2018	Angelique's Isle	Cyrus Mendenhall	
2019	Elsewhere	Bruno	
2022	Poker Face	Alex Harris	
2023	The King Tide	Beau	
TBA	Untitled Mike Thornton biopic film †	TBA	Filming

==== Television ====
Year	Title	Role	Notes
2003	After the Deluge	Young Cliff	TV movie
2006	Two Twisted	Patrick Dempsey/Clone	Season 1, Episode 7: "Soft Boiled Luck"
2007	The Starter Wife	Jorge Stewart	6 episodes
2011	East West 101	Kendrick	Season 3, Episode 6: "Behold a Pale Horse"; Season 3, Episode 7: "Revelation"
2013–2016	Rectify	Daniel Holden	4 seasons, 30 episodes
2014	Rake	Joshua	Season 3, Episode 3
2014	The Code	Randall Keats	Main role: Series 1; 6 episodes
2015	The Principal	Adam Bilic	3 episodes
2017	The Disappearance	Luke Sullivan	6 episodes
2019	Reckoning	Mike Serrato	Netflix mini-series; Main role; (10 episodes)
2023	Wellmania	Gabriel Wolf	Netflix mini-series; 1 episode
2024–2026	Law & Order Toronto: Criminal Intent	Det. Sgt. Henry Graff	Main role (Seasons 1–3)

=== As director/writer/editor ===
Year	Title	Credits			Notes
Year	Title	director	screenWriter	Film Editor	Notes
1998	The Order	Yes	Yes	Yes	Short film
2007	The Rose of Ba Ziz	Yes	Yes	Yes	Short film
2007	Loene Carmen Nashville High	Yes	No	Yes	Music video
2009	Loene Carmen Mimic the Rain	No	No	Yes	Music video
2009	Salvation	No	No	Yes	Feature Film
2009	Kalaupapa Heaven	No	No	Yes	Documentary film
2011	Waste Not	No	No	Yes	Documentary film
2015	Lo Carmen Everyone You Ever Knew (Is Coming Back To Haunt You	Yes	No	Yes	Music video

== Awards and nominations ==
- Film Critic's Association of Australia Best Actor Supporting Role Nomination forDon't Tell
- Blood in the Snow Canadian Film Festival Award for Best Actor – Winner for The Unseen (2016)
- Critics' Choice Television Award for Best Actor in a Drama Series Nomination for Rectify (2016)
- Critics' Choice Television Award for Best Actor in a Drama Series Nomination for Rectify (2015)
- Satellite Award for Best Actor – Television Series Drama Nomination for Rectify (2013)
- Australian Film Institute Awards Nomination for Best Actor in a Lead Role for River Street (1996)
- Australian Film Institute Awards Nomination for Best Actor in a Lead Role for Metal Skin (1995)
- Australian Film Critics Circle Award for Best Actor for Metal Skin (1995)
