= The Screaming Jets discography =

- Studio albums: 10
- Extended plays: 5
- Live albums: 3
- Compilation albums: 3
- Singles: 30
- Video albums: 3

The discography for the Australian rock band The Screaming Jets.

== Albums ==
=== Studio albums ===
Title	Album details	Peak chart positions	Certifications
Title	Album details	AUS	Certifications
All for One	Released: 20 April 1991; Label: rooArt; Format: CD, cassette	2	ARIA: Gold
Tear of Thought	Released: October 1992; Label: rooArt; Format: CD, cassette	3	ARIA: Platinum
The Screaming Jets	Released: August 1995; Label: rooArt; Format: CD, cassette	5	ARIA: Gold
World Gone Crazy	Released: August 1997; Label: rooArt; Format: CD, cassette	18	ARIA: Gold
Scam	Released: August 2000; Label: Grudge; Format: CD, cassette	36	
Do Ya	Released: October 2008; Label: Sony Music Australia; Format: CD, digital download	114	
Chrome	Released: 6 May 2016; Label: Dinner for Wolves / Shine On Enterprises; Format: CD, digital download	30	
Gotcha Covered	Released: 27 July 2018; Label: Dinner for Wolves / Shine On Enterprises; Format: CD, digital download, streaming	17	
All for One (30 Year Anniversary Edition)	Released: 22 October 2021; Label: Dinner for Wolves / Shine On Enterprises; Format: CD, digital download, streaming, LP; Note: Re-recording of their debut studio album.	4 (Note: According to ARIA Report w/c 1 November 2021 All for One was a re-enter at number 4 following this release. However, according to the Screaming Jets' Facebook page the band state "the re-recorded 30th Anniversary edition of our debut album All For One has debuted again in the top 5 on the official ARIA Charts!", meaning if it's considered a separate studio album, its peak is number 4 on the ARIA Charts.)	
Professional Misconduct	Released: 6 October 2023; Label: Shine On; Format: CD, digital download, streaming, LP	3	
"—" denotes a recording that did not chart or was not released in that territory.

=== Live albums ===
Title	Album details
Stealth Live!	Released: 1991; Label: rooArt (CDP 539); Format: Promotional CD (USA)
Live Forever	Released: December 2002; Label: The Screaming Jets; Format: CD, cassette
Rock On	Released: August 2005; Label: Liberation; Format: CD, digital download
Greatest Hits Live	Released: June 2011; Label: The Screaming Jets; Format: CD, cassette

=== Compilation albums ===
Title	Album details	Peak chart positions	Certifications
Title	Album details	AUS	Certifications
Hits and Pieces	Released: November 1999; Label: rooArt / BMG Australia; Format: CD, cassette	14	ARIA: Gold
The Essential Screaming Jets	Released: 11 October 2008; Label: Sony BMG; Format: CD, digital download	—	
Dirty Thirty	Released: 10 May 2019; Label: Sony Music Australia; Format: CD, digital download, streaming	121	
"—" denotes a recording that did not chart or was not released in that territory.

== Extended plays ==
Title	EP details	Peak chart positions
Title	EP details	AUS
The Scorching Adventures of the Screaming Jets EP	Released: 1990; Label: rooArt; Format: CD, cassette	—
Living in England EP	Released: June 1992; Label: rooArt; Format: CD, cassette	19
Heart of the Matter EP	Released: August 2004; Label: TSJ; Format: CD, digital download	114
Noise Collection (Chrome Live 2016)	Released: 3 February 2017; Label: Dinner for Wolves; Format: Digital download	—
Bitter Pill 2020	Released: 9 October 2020; Label: Dinner for Wolves; Format: Digital download	—
"—" denotes a recording that did not chart or was not released in that territory.

== Singles ==
List of singles, with selected chart positions
Title	Year	Peak chart positions	Certifications	Album
Title	Year	AUS	Certifications	Album
"C'Mon"	1990	84		The Scorching Adventures of the Screaming Jets / All for One
"Better"	1991	4	ARIA: Gold	All for One
"Stop the World"	1991	33		All for One
"Shine On"	1991	36		All for One
"F.R.C" (international release)	1991	—N/a		All for One
"Think"	1992	60		Tear of Thought
"Shivers"	1993	19		Tear of Thought
"Here I Go"	1993	63		Tear of Thought
"Helping Hand"	1993	25		Tear of Thought
"Tunnel"	1994	39		Tear of Thought
"Sad Song"	1995	promo		The Screaming Jets
"Friend of Mine"	1995	44		The Screaming Jets
"Sacrifice"	1996	105		The Screaming Jets
"Elvis (...I Remember)"	1997	71		World Gone Crazy
"Eve of Destruction"	1997	64		World Gone Crazy
"October Grey"	1998	55		World Gone Crazy
"Cunnamulla Feller"	1998	58		Not So Dusty (Slim Dusty tribute album)
"I Need Your Love"	1999	152		Hits and Pieces
"Individuality"	1999	67		Hits and Pieces
"Shine Over Me"	2000	93		Scam
"Higher with You"	2000	181		Scam
"Helping Hand" (live)	2005	promo		Rock On
"Do Ya"	2008	—		Do Ya
"Automatic Cowboy"	2016	—		Chrome
"Cash in Your Ticket"	2016	—		Chrome
"Wedding Ring"	2018	—		Gotcha Covered
"C'Mon (2021)"	2021	—		All For One (30th Anniversary Edition)
"Shine On (2021)"	2021	—		All For One (30th Anniversary Edition)
"Stop the World (2021)	2021	—		All For One (30th Anniversary Edition)
"Nothing to Lose"	2023	—		Professional Misconduct
"Second Chance"	2023	—		Professional Misconduct
