= Dirty Thirty (album) =

Greatest hits album by The Screaming Jets
- Released: 10 May 2019
- Recorded: 1990–2016
- Label: Sony Music Australia

The Screaming Jets chronology
Gotcha Covered (2018)	Dirty Thirty (2019)	All for One (30 Year Anniversary Edition) (2021)

Dirty Thirty is a greatest hits album by Australian rock band The Screaming Jets, released on 10 May 2019. The album celebrates the 30th anniversary of the band's formation and includes tracks from the band's first seven studio albums.

The album will be supported by a national tour commencing in Newcastle on 3 May and concluding in Adelaide on 25 May.

== Track listing ==
CD1

No.	Title	Writer(s)	Album	Length
1.	"Better"	Grant Walmsley	All for One	4:36
2.	"C'Mon"	David Gleeson; Richard Lara	The Scorching Adventures of the Screaming Jets / All for One	2:47
3.	"Shine On" (album version)	Paul Woseen	All for One	6:04
4.	"Needle"	Woseen	All for One	3:40
5.	"F.R.C."	Woseen	All for One	3:44
6.	"Here I Go"	Woseen	Tear of Thought	4:39
7.	"Helping Hand"	Woseen	Tear of Thought	4:50
8.	"Shivers"	Rowland S. Howard	Tear of Thought	4:26
9.	"Think"	Woseen	Tear of Thought	4:48
10.	"Dream On"	Woseen	Tear of Thought	4:55
11.	"Tunnell"	Gleeson; Lara	Living in England / Tear of Thought	4:37
12.	"Living in England"	Walmsley	Living in England / Tear of Thought	2:14
13.	"Friend of Mine"	Woseen	The Screaming Jets	3:38
14.	"Sad Song"	Walmsley	The Screaming Jets	2:55
15.	"Disappear"	Gleeson; Woseen	The Screaming Jets	2:50

CD2

No.	Title	Writer(s)	Album	Length
1.	"Eve of Destruction"	P. F. Sloan	World Gone Crazy	3:28
2.	"October Grey"	Woseen	World Gone Crazy	3:52
3.	"Silence Lost"	Woseen	World Gone Crazy	3:19
4.	"Strength"	Gleeson; Walmsley; Woseen	World Gone Crazy	2:52
5.	"No Way Out"	Woseen	Scam	2:50
6.	"Protest Song"	Woseen	Scam	3:07
7.	"Hitting Myself in the Head"	Woseen	Scam	3:02
8.	"Do Ya"	Gleeson; Izzy Osmanovic	Do Ya	2:34
9.	"Falls in Place"	Woseen	Do Ya	3:52
10.	"Knock Knock"	Woseen	Do Ya	2:53
11.	"Forget the Rhyme"	Woseen	Do Ya	3:30
12.	"Cash in Your Ticket"	Woseen	Chrome	4:09
13.	"Razor"	Gleeson; Jimi Hocking	Chrome	3:16
14.	"Automatic Cowboy"	Woseen	Chrome	3:26
15.	"No Place Like Home"	Woseen; Scott Kingman	Chrome	4:38

== Charts ==
Chart performance for Do Ya
Chart (2019)	Peak position
Australian Albums (ARIA)	121

== Release history ==
Region	Date	Format	Edition(s)	Label	Catalogue
Australia	10 May 2019	CD; digital download; streaming	2×CD	Sony Music Australia	19075949902
