= Hits and Pieces =

Greatest hits album by the Screaming Jets
- Released: November 1999
- Recorded: 1991–1999
- Genre: Rock, pub rock
- Label: rooArt, BMG Australia
- Producer: Steve James

The Screaming Jets chronology
| World Gone Crazy (1997) | Hits and Pieces (1999) | Scam (2000) |

Singles from Hits and Pieces
- 1. "I Need Your Love" Released: 1999; 2. "Individuality" Released: June 1999

Hits and Pieces is the first greatest hits album by Australian rock band the Screaming Jets released in November 1999. The album includes tracks from their four studio albums and two new tracks off the band's next album Scam.

The album was released with a limited edition bonus disc titled Rarities It included live tracks recorded in 1991/1992.

Hits and Pieces DVD was released in 2004. It features video clips, interviews, documentary footage and live recordings recorded up until the release of Hits and Pieces (CD).

== Track listing ==
| No. | Title | Writer(s) | Length |
|---|---|---|---|
| 1. | "C'mon" | Dave Gleeson, Richard Lara | 2:48 |
| 2. | "Better" | Grant Walmsley | 4:39 |
| 3. | "I Need Your Love" | Walmsley | 3:42 |
| 4. | "Sad Song" | Walmsley | 2:55 |
| 5. | "Helping Hand" | Paul Woseen | 4:47 |
| 6. | "Blue Sashes" | Greg Bryce, Walmsley | 3:29 |
| 7. | "Needle" | Woseen | 3:50 |
| 8. | "Living in England" | Walmsley | 2:15 |
| 9. | "Individuality" | Walmsley | 3:58 |
| 10. | "Sacrifice" | Gleeson, Walmsley, Woseen | 3:10 |
| 11. | "Shivers" | Rowland S. Howard | 4:28 |
| 12. | "October Grey" | Woseen | 3:53 |
| 13. | "Elvis (...I Remember)" | Gleeson, Walmsley | 3:33 |
| 14. | "Eve of Destruction" | P.F. Sloan | 3:28 |
| 15. | "Tunnel" | Gleeson, Lara | 3:49 |
| 16. | "Silence Lost" | Woseen | 3:20 |
| 17. | "Shine On" | Woseen | 4:53 |
| 18. | "Impossible" | Walmsley | 3:08 |

== Bonus disc track listing ==
Rarities
| No. | Title | Writer(s) | Length |
|---|---|---|---|
| 1. | "Needle" (live) | | 3:46 |
| 2. | "Starting Out" (live) | | 3:58 |
| 3. | "Rocket Man" (live) | | 3:21 |
| 4. | "F.R.C." (live) | | 7:55 |
| 5. | "Think" (acoustic) | Gleeson, Walmsley, Woseen | 5:23 |
| 6. | "Fix the Feeble" (acoustic) | Woseen | 3:20 |

- Note: tracks 1–4 recorded at The Palais, Newcastle, May 1991
- Note: tracks 5–6 were recorded in 1992.

== Charts and certifications ==
=== Weekly charts ===
| Chart (1999/2000) | Peak position |
|---|---|
| Australian Albums (ARIA) | 13 |

=== Certifications ===
| Region | Certification | Certified units/sales |
|---|---|---|
| Australia (ARIA) | Gold | 35,000^{^} |
^{^} Shipments figures based on certification alone.

== Hits and Pieces DVD ==
| Chart (2004) | Position |
|---|---|
| ARIA Top 40 DVD | 22 |
