= Rock On (The Screaming Jets album) =

Live album by The Screaming Jets
- Released: 17 October 2005
- Recorded: Evan Theatre, Penrith, 2004
- Genre: Rock, Pub Rock
- Length: 66:50
- Label: Liberation Records
- Producer: The Screaming Jets

The Screaming Jets chronology
Heart of the Matter EP (2004)	Rock On (2005)	Do Ya (2008)

Singles from Rock On
- 1. "Helping Hand" Released: 2005

Rock On is the second live album by the Australian rock band The Screaming Jets released in 2005. It was also released as a DVD (Rock On) with this disc as a bonus disc.

== Track listing ==
1. "Reputation" – 2:54
2. "Black and White" – 2:47
3. "Tunnel" – 4:42
4. "Heart of the Matter" – 2:51
5. "Higher With You" – 2:41
6. "Realise" – 2:58
7. "I Need Your Love" – 3:57
8. "Blue Sashes" – 3:42
9. "Pablo" – 3:01
10. "Shine Over Me" – 4:04
11. "October Grey" – 4:03
12. "Sad Song" – 3:38
13. "Helping Hand" – 5:14
14. "Right Place, Wrong Time" – 3:21
15. "Another Day" – 2:50
16. "Living in England" – 2:07
17. "Needle to the Red" – 3:36
18. "Better" – 5:00
19. "C'mon" – 3:15

== Credits ==
- Bass – Paul Woseen
- Drums – Col Hatchman
- Guitar – Grant Walmsley, Izzy Osmanovic
- Vocals – Dave Gleeson

== Release history ==
Region	Date	Format(s)	Label	Catalogue
Australia	17 October 2005	Compact Disc	Liberation Records	LIBCD7178.2
Australia	17 October 2005	DVD	Liberation Records	LIBDVD1048
