= Dirty thirty =

Dirty thirty may refer to:

- Dirty 30 (film), a 2016 comedy film
- "Dirty 30" (Gimme Gimme Gimme), a 2000 television episode
- Dirty Thirty (album), a 2019 compilation album by Australian rock band The Screaming Jets
- Dirty thirty (Guantanamo Bay Naval Base), a group of Arab captives in Guantanamo, believed to be Osama bin Laden bodyguards
- Dirty thirty (NYPD), a 1990s group of NYPD officers suspected of improprieties
- Dirty thirty (Sellafield), Building B30 at Sellafield, "the most hazardous industrial building in western Europe"
- Dirty thirty (Vietnam), a group of USAF pilots in the Vietnam War
- Dirty thirty (WWF), the World Wildlife Federation list of dirty fossil-fueled electric plant
- Dirty Thirty, a group of rogue agents in the TV series Nikita
- The Challenge XXX: Dirty 30, the 30th season of the MTV reality competition series, The Challenge
- Dirty Thirty (Texas politics), a bipartisan coalition in the Texas legislature in the 1970s
