= Here I Go (The Screaming Jets song) =

1993 single by the Screaming Jets

- CD single cover

Single by the Screaming Jets

from the album Tear of Thought
- Released: 5 July 1993
- Length: 3:32
- Label: rooArt
- Songwriter(s): Paul Woseen
- Producer(s): Steve James

The Screaming Jets singles chronology
"Shivers" (1993)	"Here I Go" (1993)	"Helping Hand" (1993)

"Here I Go" is a song by Australian rock band the Screaming Jets. It was released in July 1993 as the third single from the band's second studio album, Tear of Thought (1992). The song peaked at number 63 on the Australian Singles Chart.

== Track listings ==
Australian single

1. "Here I Go" (radio version) – 3:32
2. "C'Mon"(live) – 3:23
3. "Dream On"(live) – 5:37
4. "Tunnel"(live) – 4:38
5. "Better"(live) – 5:25
6. "Here I Go" (album version) – 4:47
- Live tracks recorded on tour in the UK by BBC Radio and broadcast on 16 April 1993.

UK single

1. "Here I Go" – 4:47
2. "Think" (acoustic) – 5:23
3. "Pretty Vacant" – 3:00
4. "F.R.C." (live) – 7:45
- Live track recorded live at The Palais, Newcastle in May 1991.

== Charts ==
Weekly chart performance for "Here I Go"
Chart (1993)	Peak position
Australia (ARIA)	63

== Release history ==
Release dates and formats for "Here I Go"
Region	Date	Format(s)	Label	Ref.
Australia	5 July 1993	CD; cassette	rooArt	
United Kingdom	1993	12-inch vinyl; CD	rooArt	
