= Rock On =

Rock On may refer to:

== Film and television ==
- Rock On (2005 film), a DVD by the Screaming Jets
- Rock On!!, a 2008 Bollywood rock musical film
- Bandslam (working title Rock On), a 2009 American musical romantic-comedy film
- "Rock On!" (Corner Gas) a 2005 TV episode
- "Rock On!" (Schitt's Creek) a 2019 TV episode

== Music ==
=== Albums ===
- Rock On (The Bunch album), 1972
- Rock On (David Essex album) or the title song (see below), 1973
- Rock On! (Del Shannon album), 1991
- Rock On (Humble Pie album), 1971
- Rock On (Raydio album), 1979
- Rock On (The Screaming Jets album), 2005
- Rock On!! (soundtrack), from the Bollywood film, 2008
- Rock On!, by Barry Stanton and Johnny Rebb, 1981

=== Songs ===
- "Rock On" (David Essex song), 1973, covered by Michael Damian (1989) and Def Leppard (2006)
- "Rock On" (Tucker Beathard song), 2016
- "Rock On", by Black 'N Blue from In Heat, 1988
- "Rock On", by Dr. Teeth and the Electric Mayhem from The Muppets Mayhem soundtrack, 2023
- "Rock On", by Funkdoobiest from Brothas Doobie, 1995
- "Rock On!", by Gary Glitter from Glitter, 1972
- "Rock On", by Moka Only from Airport 5, 2011
- "Rock On", by T. Rex from The Slider, 1972
- "Rock On (Over and Over)", by Lemon Twigs from A Dream Is All We Know, 2024

== Video games ==
- Rock-On, a 1989 video game for the TurboGrafx-16/PC Engine

== Other ==
- Sign of the horns
