= Col Hatchman =

Australian rock musician (born 1975)

- Born: Colin Craig Hatchman; 2 February 1975 (age 51); Brisbane, Queensland, Australia
- Genres: Rock
- Occupation: Drummer
- Instrument: Drums
- Years active: 1994–present

Colin Craig Hatchman (born 2 February 1975) is an Australian rock musician who joined The Screaming Jets as their drummer during 2001–2004. In 2004 he joined Nathan Cavaleri in Dirty Skanks, Hatchman broke the Guinness Book of World Records as 'Loudest Drummer in the World' on 4 August 2006, the sound was measured at 137.2 dBA.

== Career ==
Hatchman was born in Brisbane and began playing drums in the early 1980s when he was eight years old. He played in marching bands, big bands, metal & punk bands, but found his home with rock bands.

Hatchman played with Brisbane-based band Little Hornet which formed in the early 1990s and moved to Newcastle during 1994–1999. They released five albums, twelve singles and played thousands of gigs. While Little Hornet was working on their fifth album, Hatchman formed another band, Chicaine. The band was renamed Blue, with Hatchman as drummer and lead vocalist.

== The Screaming Jets ==
The Screaming Jets guitarist Grant Walmsley had seen Hatchman playing drums in Little Hornet. The Sreaming Jets had already released five studio albums and were looking for a replacement for departed drummer Craig Rosevear—Hatchman joined in 2001. He made headlines when kicked off an aeroplane on the way home from a tour. With Hatchman, the band recorded a double live album Live Forever in June. Soon after, they took a break and returned to touring and performing in late 2002. They recorded an EP, Heart of the Matter, which was released in August 2004.

== Dirty Skanks ==
Australian guitarist Nathan Cavaleri was looking to start a new band, Dirty Skanks, and approached Hatchman. The two began jamming and writing new music. Hatchman was recording, mixing & shooting video clips for the Dirty Skanks' debut album, Voluptuosity in between touring commitments with The Screaming Jets. At the end of 2003 the album, Voluptuosity was released with its first single "MILF" being picked up by radio stations in the country.

With touring schedules beginning to clash, Hatchman left The Screaming Jets and his last show was filmed for a live DVD Rock On, which was released the following year. More singles from Dirty Skanks' Voluptuosity, “Backyard Parties” and “Shots” were released in 2005 which was received by radio stations and picked up by cable channels across Australia.

In August 2006, Hatchman broke the Guinness World Record, as the 'Loudest Drummer in the World'—the sound of his acoustic drums being played was measured at 137.2 dBA.

He has begun schooling a new generation of drummers at The Rockstatution and they played shows at the Newcastle Civic Theatre. The Band formed with guitarist Nathan Cavaleri "Dirty Skanks" have formed into a new group with the moniker Nat Col and the Kings. Have begun touring with fellow Aussie Rockers Electric Mary, playing several shows through September - October 2010.

== Equipment ==
- Drum Workshop Drums
- Sabian Cymbals
- Vater Custom Col Hatchman Sticks
