= Kinematic (band) =

Australian indie pop band

- Origin: Melbourne, Victoria, Australia
- Genre: Indie pop
- Years active: 2002–present
- Label: Somersault
- Members: Gordon Clarke; Michael Owen; Michael Clarke; Mark Olszewski
- Website: kinematic.info

Kinematic are an Australian indie pop band formed in 2002. Originally an acoustic duo of Gordon Clarke (ex-Snorkel) on guitar and vocals and Michael Owen (ex-Aspirin) on vocals and guitar formed in 2000; they were joined by Gordon's brother, Michael Clarke, on bass guitar and backing vocals and Mark Olszewski on drums (both ex-Aspirin).

Kinematic have diverse musical influences including Sparklehorse, Wilco, and The Beatles. They recorded their debut album, Time & Place, in November 2004 and released it on the Somersault Music label, based in Rye. They had used a country house in Gippsland, which was described by Michael Clarke as "a mud brick place on 40 acres of bush... We worked for 10 days straight. We just picked the best places for each instrument in the house, and we were lucky because there was heaps of space, high ceilings and this reverb — a really natural sound." Time & Place was mastered by François Tétaz. It was launched at the Corner Hotel, Melbourne on 9 October 2005.

The band's second album, The 38th Parallel, was issued in April 2007. Progressive Broadcasting Service's reviewer felt it "traverses the array of musical styles that Kinematic love to plunder – be it Cash-tinged country or Sparklehorse-like trashy power pop – while always maintaining their unique sensibility for simple, stripped-back and singable pop tunes." The group had released a single, "Love and Graffiti", in July 2006, which is an "infectious" example of "their penchant for melancholic melody, but with a darker twist."

The band's third album, Kites, was released in 2009 and features Jimi Hocking playing guitar on the track 'Beat Poetry'. Kites features a more diverse song list, described as "some really satisfying breadth" by Bernard Zuel.

Gordon and Owen were featured on 774 ABC Melbourne's evening program with Lindy Burns in October 2014, playing two songs live.

Kinematic recorded a live performance for a forthcoming DVD/CD release "Kinematic: Live at Bakehouse". at Bakehouse Studios, Melbourne in March 2017. The DVD/CD was launched in Melbourne in 2019.

Kinematic's 2020 song West Gate Bridge was featured on the Nine Network documentary West Gate Bridge Disaster: The Untold Stories which commemorated the 50th anniversary of the tragic West Gate Bridge collapse.

Since their last full-length album release in 2022, Kinematic have been active in the Melbourne music scene launching multiple singles.

== Kinematic featured outside Australia ==
Despite hailing from Melbourne, Australia, Kinematic has been featured across North America:

- Kinecism was reviewed by independent Canadian music site Rokline.
- The Kinematic song 'In Between' was featured on the syndicated radio show 'This American Life' in October 2012.
- The Kinematic song 'Championship Vinyl' (named after the record store in Nick Nornby's novel 'High Fidelity') was featured in Episode 11 of the US sitcom Cavemen, which aired on ABC in 2007.

== Members ==
- Gordon Clarke – guitar, vocals
- Michael Owen – lead vocals, guitar, keyboards
- Michael Clarke – bass guitar, backing vocals
- Mark Olszewski – drums

== Discography ==
- Time & Place (October 2005) Somersault Music (5sWDo97)
- The 38th Parallel (April 2007)
- Kites (2009)
- Kinecism (2014) – Review
- Live at Bakehouse (March 2019)
- No. One Fan – Best of album compiled from fan feedback (2020)
- The Long Divide – acoustic album (2022)
