= Martha's Vineyard (band) =

Australian rock band

- Origin: Perth, Western Australia, Australia
- Genres: Acoustic folk-pop post punk Alternative rock
- Years active: 1986–1990
- Labels: Monkey, rooArt, Polygram
- Past members: see Members list below

Martha's Vineyard were an Australian rock band formed in Perth, Western Australia in May 1986 by lead singer Peggy Van Zalm. In June 1989 the group issued their debut self-titled album on rooArt, which was produced by Nick Mainsbridge. It peaked in the top 100 on the Kent Music Report Albums Chart. Australian musicologist, Ian McFarlane, described their sound as "reflective folk rock [which] mixed melancholy vocals, acoustic and electric guitars, gentle percussion and spacious arrangements to arrive at a harmonious and intriguing whole". They shared a similar sound and outlook to that of fellow Perth bands like The Triffids, The Honeys and Chad's Tree. Van Zalm's vocals drew positive comparisons with Patti Smith, Chrissie Hynde and Joni Mitchell. The group had toured nationally supporting Mick Hucknall's Simply Red, INXS, Annie Lennox's Eurythmics, The Go-Betweens, Paul Kelly, The Triffids, Mental as Anything, proto punk band,The Saints and Weddings, Parties, Anything, before disbanding in 1990. By 1994 Van Zalm had launched her solo career.

== History ==
In May 1986 Peggy Van Zalm (ex-Distant Carnival), on lead vocals, acoustic guitar and harmonica, co-founded Martha's Vineyard with Anthony Best (later known by his monastic contemplative name, Bhante Sujato) on guitar, harmonica and vocals, Lisa Jooste on violin, Norman Parkhill (The Scream, Matinee Idols, Photoplay, Scant Regarde) on bass guitar and vocals, and Aidan D'Adhemar on drums, percussion and vocals. The Perth-based band took their name from the holiday resort island off the coast of Massachusetts, United States. Van Zalm had grown up in Cowaramup, a small farming and vineyard town, before studying Fine Arts at Curtin University. The band's first performance was on 21 May 1986 at the Red Parrot nightclub supporting proto punk garage band, The Saints, three weeks after forming. Soon after they issued a self-titled five-track cassette, recorded at Northlake Studios in Fremantle with James Hewgill, which was followed with a shared single, "Our Day", with Errol H. Tout's "Sounds of Swimming" on Lizard Records/Monkey Music. "Our Day" was written by Van Zalm. Catherine McAuliffe joined on bass guitar and Parkhill switched to guitar.

In the following months the band played support performances for Paul Kelly, Weddings, Parties, Anything, The Go-Betweens and Mental As Anything. Martha's Vineyard also supported Eurythmics and INXS at the Perth Entertainment Centre.

In October 1987 a six-track mini-album, For a Small World, followed on the Monkey Music label. The title track was written by Best. Soon after Stuart Fenner replaced Jooste on violin and Phil Kakulas (ex-The Triffids) replaced McAuliffe on bass guitar. In late 1987 the band went on an Eastern States tour supporting The Triffids on their Calenture tour. In 1988 the line-up of Best, D'Adhemar, Kakulas and Van Zalm re-located to Sydney. The following year they signed with the rooArt label alongside The Trilobites, Crash Politics, Tall Tales and True, Hipslingers and The Hummingbirds. Martha's Vineyard contributed the track "Unravelling" to the first of rooArt's compilations, RooArt Present Young Blood (September 1988), which was "a collection of newer indie acts". "Unravelling" was written by Van Zalm. The band were one of four selected from the compilation which were signed for a three-album deal. In 1989 Toby Creswell, the editor of Australian Rolling Stone named them as one of five 'new' bands that he thought most deserve to succeed on the charts.

In April 1989 The Sydney Morning Herald's reviewer John O'Donnell caught their performance at Harold Park Hotel, he praised their "lilting, well constructed arrangements, van Zalm's assured voice and the intelligent, minimal use of volume all combined to provide ... the ambience of a folk club. Fortunately, tidy folk tunes are not all that M. V. play". Martha's Vineyard recorded their only album at Planet Studios in Perth, which was produced by Nick Mainsbridge (The Triffids, Tall Tales and True). In June 1989 rooArt issued the self-titled album, Martha's Vineyard, and a single, "Old Beach Road", which were distributed by PolyGram Records. The album received favourable reviews nationally and abroad. It peaked in the top 100 on the Kent Music Report Albums Chart. "Old Beach Road" received airplay on both commercial and community radios stations, including 2JJJ, 3RRR and Triple M, reaching No. 86 on the Australian Kent Music Report Singles Chart. It was co-written by Best and Van Zalm. The record company negotiated Martha's Vineyard as opening act with Simply Red on their national tour throughout Australia as part of the promotion of the band's album. Early the following year, "Old Beach Road" was also issued as a four-track 12" extended play of the same name for the European market.

A second single, "More of the Same", was released on rooArt; before pressures from both within and outside the band led to its split in 1990. RooArt nevertheless released the album in the UK, Europe, Japan and the United States, under the title Old Beach Road taking advantage of the success of the single. The band attracted much critical acclaim and shared stages on tours with Simply Red, INXS, Eurythmics, The Go-Betweens, Paul Kelly, The Triffids, Mental as Anything, The Saints and Weddings, Parties, Anything. Australian musicologist, Ian McFarlane, described their sound as "reflective folk rock [which] mixed melancholy vocals, acoustic and electric guitars, gentle percussion and spacious arrangements to arrive at a harmonious and intriguing whole". He felt that they shared a similar sound and outlook to that of fellow Perth bands The Triffids, The Honeys and Chad's Tree. He drew positive comparisons between Van Zalm's vocals with Patti Smith, Chrissie Hynde and Joni Mitchell.

=== Post Martha's Vineyard ===
In 1989 Kakulas had formed a side project, The Blackeyed Susans, with David McComb, Alsy MacDonald (members of The Triffids), Rob Snarski (Chad's Tree) and Ross Bolleter. Following the break-up of Martha's Vineyard, Kakulas worked with Grant McLennan (ex-The Go-Betweens) on the latter's solo project before Kakulas rejoined The Blackeyed Susans as that band's bass guitarist. The Blackeyed Susans' have released seven studio albums and a live album, a number of which were produced by Kakulas.

By March 1991 Jooste, on guitar, violin, keyboards and backing vocals, had joined The Deadly Nightshades with Ross Buncle (from punk rock band The Victims) and Ian Young (Scant Regarde).

Van Zalm launched her solo career, at the end of 1994, with the release of the album, Shine. In June 1999, she issued her second album, Revival, on her own Red Dirt Records label, it was produced by Graham 'Buzz' Bidstrup (ex-Angels, GANGgajang), and featured Van Zalm's trademark folksy, jazzy pop vocals. She then released two albums with co-producer Geoff Nant, Different World in 2001 and Light Diamond in 2006.

Best became disillusioned with the alternative music scene and moved to Thailand in 1992 to pursue a contemplative vocation, where he became a Buddhist meditation monk in the Thai Forest Tradition, taking the monastic Pali name Bhante Sujato at his ordination. He returned to Australia in 2003 and set up a religious community, Santi Forest Monastery, outside Sydney. He resigned from the post of Abbott in 2012, moving to Bodhinyana Monastery, Western Australia. He still self-identifies as a committed anarchist. In 2019, Sujato moved to Sydney to establish Lokanta Vihāra (the Monastery at the End of the World) to explore what it means to follow the Buddha’s teachings in an era of climate change, globalised consumerism, and political turmoil. He is also involved with Engaged Buddhism. In a Buddhist Dharma talk entitled I am an anarchist for Dhammanet, Sujato states his anarchist ideology, specifically aligning himself with anarcho-pacifism, which he explains as being compatible with The Buddha, Buddhist lay and renunciant life, as well as being in accord with the monastic vinaya. In the speech, Sujato explains his belief that The Buddha was also an anarchist.

Parkhill went onto manage acts including Frente, Nikka Costa, The Badloves and Leonardo's Bride. In 2005 he established inSYNC Music, which provides specialist music services for film, TV and advertising. He has produced the soundtracks for a number of Australian movies (including Somersault, Candy, Kenny, The Black Balloon and Tomorrow, When the War Began) and television series (including Packed to the Rafters, Top of the Lake, East of Everything and Miss Fisher's Murder Mysteries).

== Members ==
- Anthony Best a.k.a. Bhante Sujato – guitar, harmonica, vocals (1986–1990)
- Aidan D'Adhemar – drums, percussion, vocals (1986–1987, 1988–1989)
- Lisa Jooste – violin (1986–1987)
- Catherine McAuliffe – bass guitar (1986–1987)
- Norman Parkhill – bass guitar, guitar, vocals (1986–1989)
- Peggy Van Zalm – lead vocals, guitar, harmonica (1986–1990)
- Stuart Fenner – violin (1987)
- Phil Kakulas – bass guitar (1987–1990)
- James Elliot – drums (1990)

== Discography ==
=== Studio albums ===
List of studio albums, with Australian chart positions.
Title	Album details	Peak chart positions
Title	Album details	AUS KMR
Martha's Vineyard	Released: June 1989; Label: rooArt, Polygram Records (838 210–1, 838 210–4, 838 210–2); Formats: LP, MC, CD; Note: Released as Old Beach Road in some markets.	77

=== Extended plays ===
List of extended plays.
Title	Album details
Martha's Vineyard	Released: 1986; Label: Independent; Formats: MC
For a Small World	Released: October 1987; Label: Monkey Music (MONK 3); Formats: 12" mini-album

=== Singles ===
List of singles, with selected chart positions, showing year released and album name
Title	Year	Peak chart positions	Album
Title	Year	AUS KMR	Album
"Our Day"	1986	—	shared single (with Errol H Tout's "Sounds of Swimming")
"Old Beach Road"	1989	86	Martha's Vineyard
"More of the Same"	1990	—	Martha's Vineyard
"—" denotes a recording that did not chart or was not released in that territory.

== Awards and nominations ==
=== ARIA Music Awards ===
The ARIA Music Awards is an annual awards ceremony that recognises excellence, innovation, and achievement across all genres of Australian music. They commenced in 1987.

Year	Nominee / work	Award	Result	Ref.
1990	Martha's Vineyard	Best New Talent	Nominated	
