= Sweet Baby James and Rob Eyers =

Sweet Baby James & Rob Eyers were a blues duo from Adelaide, Australia, made up of James Meston (guitar/vocals) and Rob Eyers (drums/percussion). Rhythms magazine described them as "fantastic, their two-piece guitar/drum combo outshoots The White Stripes, The Black Keys, The Mess Hall, the Fumes, anyone you care to mention".

Their first album, Rhythm n Blues, released by the Black Market Music record label in 2005, is a cornucopia of assorted blues styles played with an electric energy. There is delicate fingerpicking, growling slide guitar and sparse country blues. Their raw sound evokes wild nights at the traditional juke joints of America's south.

They are no longer performing or recording. Their last live performance was at a benefit concert in Adelaide for Chris Wilson (Australian musician) in September 2018.
