= Craig Rosevear =

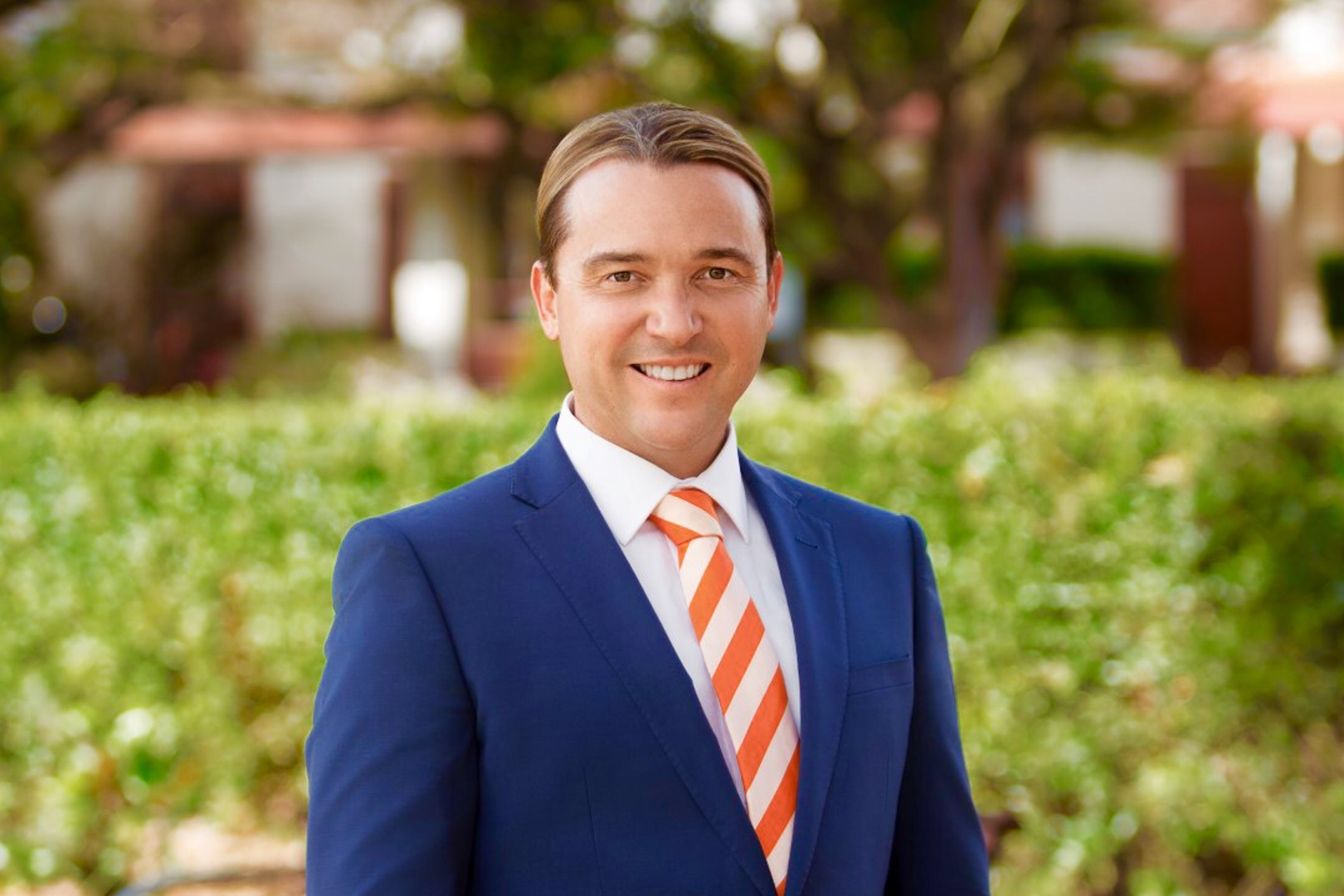

Background information
- Born: Craig Gary Rosevear; Newcastle, New South Wales, Australia
- Genres: Hard rock
- Instruments: Drums, percussion
- Years active: 1990–present
- Formerly of: The Screaming Jets

Craig Gary Rosevear is an Australian drummer, auctioneer and TV presenter from Newcastle. He joined hard rock group The Screaming Jets from 1993 to 2001. In 2005 Rosevear with his wife Belinda set up a music school Rosies's School of Rock in Newcastle focusing on performance & band coaching for kids. His portrait, Rock and role model by Peter Sesselmann, was entered for the 2009 Archibald Prize. In 2017 Rosevear won the Newcastle Heat of the Real Estate Institute of NSW Auctioneering Competition and is the host of lifestyle program Location Living Lifestyle on Network Nine.

== Biography ==
Craig Rosevear started his musical career with the Sydney Youth Orchestra, before becoming lead drummer for 5 years with the Newcastle Combined High Schools Marching Band, or The Marching Koalas. He was also percussionist with the Broadmeadow High School Concert Band.

In 1990, he joined Sydney-based hard rock bands Angry Snuff Puppett and then BB Steal. With BB Steal, he recorded their debut full-length album, On the Edge, which was released in 1991. They supported Def Leppard on the Australian leg of their 1992 tour.

Rosevear joined rock group, The Screaming Jets, in July 1993. He was the permanent replacement for founding drummer, Brad Heaney who had been sacked in April and was temporarily filled-in by United Kingodom's Dave Holland (ex-Judas Priest) for the last leg of their European tour. The band supported Def Leppard and Ugly Kid Joe on their tour of United States. They returned to Australia in late 1993 and released a single, "Helping Hand" from their previous album, Tear of Thought (1992, before Rosevear had joined). With Rosevear, they recorded their third studio album, The Screaming Jets, which was released in August 1995 with the related single, "Friend of Mine" appearing in November. The album peaked at No. 5 on the Australian Recording Industry Association (ARIA) Albums Chart. They followed with World Gone Crazy in August 1997, which reached the top 20 and compilation album, Hits and Pieces in November 1999, which also peaked in the top 20. Rosevear left The Screaming Jets by 2000 and was replaced by Col Hatchman (ex-Hang Seng). Rosevear briefly played for Newcastle band, DV8 with Greg Bryce and Mark Middleton.

In 2005 he set up his own music school called "Rosie's School of Rock" inspired from some of the Rock Schools he saw in USA. The school provides tuition on all Rock instruments and hosts concerts every term. The school's core aim is to provide a learning environment that creates confidence in kids by enabling them to create a 'cooler' image for themselves, including kids with disabilities. Many students form bands, perform, make and promote albums, get on radio and TV. With Retro Rockets, Rosevear released a third album, Cars, Guitars and Girls from Mars in 2007. In 2009, Peter Sesselmann's portrait of Rosevear was entered into the Archibald Prize as Rock and role model and was "symbolic of the rock drummer's transition from touring musician to educator over the past few years". In 2011, DV8 released a live album, Live at the Wicko.

Craig also sometimes plays in an 80s tribute trio with Brien McVernon (From the Retro Rockets), however real estate commitments, have kept this minimal.
