= Chrome (The Screaming Jets album) =

Studio album by The Screaming Jets
- Released: 6 May 2016
- Genre: Rock, pub rock
- Length: 36:37
- Label: Dinner for Wolves, Shine On
- Producer: Steve James

The Screaming Jets chronology
The Essential Screaming Jets (2008)	Chrome (2016)	Gotcha Covered (2018)

Singles from Chrome
- 1. "Automatic Cowboy" Released: May 2016; 2. "Cash in Your Ticket" Released: November 2016

Chrome is the seventh studio album by the Australian band The Screaming Jets. The album was announced in March 2016 along with a national tour in May.

The band introduced some of the new tracks during their 2015 'Rock n Roll Rampage' tour. and said the new songs were "warmly embraced" by the fans. Band member Dave Gleeson said "We think this is probably as complete an album as we have ever done. It sits very well beside Tear of Thought There are plenty of different textures and great big fat rock songs, as well as some quiet moments. We hit the nail right on the head with this album of what the Jets sound like."

The album was released on 6 May 2016 and debuted and peaked at number 30 in Australia, becoming band’s first Top 50 appearance since Scam (October 2000).

== Reception ==
Robyn Doreian from Rolling Stone Australia gave the album 3 1/2 out of 4 saying; "Such maturity places the focus on crafting satisfying, memorable tunes like rollicking opener "Automatic Cowboy". Tempo spans Western-infused "Razor" to reflective ballad "No Place No Home"; rock flares ignite on "The Grip" and soaring anthem "Scar". Impressive is the solidity of Gleeson's voice, as is the vibrancy of the guitars of Jimi Hocking and Scott Kingman. Chrome feels like a band refreshed."

== Track listing ==
No.	Title	Writer(s)	Length
1.	"Automatic Cowboy"	Paul Woseen	3:27
2.	"Cash in Your Ticket"	Woseen	4:10
3.	"Razor"	Dave Gleeson, Jimi Hocking	3:17
4.	"No Place No Home"	Woseen, Scott Kingman	4:36
5.	"The Grip"	Woseen, Kingman	2:40
6.	"Sex and Violence"	Woseen	4:27
7.	"Won't Stop You"	Woseen	3:15
8.	"Smack in the Mouth"	Gleeson, Hocking, Woseen	3:38
9.	"Scar"	Woseen	3:58
10.	"Turn It Around"	Woseen	3:09
Total length:			36:37

== Weekly charts ==
Chart (2016)	Peak position
Australian Albums (ARIA)	30

== Release history ==
Country	Date	Format	Label	Catalogue
Australia	6 May 2016	CD; digital download	Dinner for Wolves	TV126
