= Rock On (2005 film) =

Video by The Screaming Jets
- Released: 22 August 2005
- Length: 97 min.
- Label: Liberation Records

The Screaming Jets chronology
Hits and Pieces (video) (2004)	Rock On (2005)	The Real Deal Tour Live (2014)

Rock On is a DVD released by the Australian band The Screaming Jets in 2005. It features a live performance at Evan Theatre, Penrith and some bonus material such as an interview with the band and the video clips for Heart of the Matter and Right Place, Wrong Time. It also came with a bonus disc of the extended live performance also called Rock On.

== Track listing ==
1. "Reputation"
2. "Black & White"
3. "Tunnel"
4. "Heart of the Matter"
5. "Higher With You"
6. "Blue Sashes"
7. "Shine Over Me"
8. "October Grey"
9. "Sad Song"
10. "Helping Hand"
11. "Right Place, Wrong Time"
12. "Another Day"
13. "Needle to the Red"
14. "Better"
15. "C'mon"

=== Charts ===
Chart (2005)	Position
ARIA Top 40 DVD	11

== Special features ==
- Behind the scenes documentary - Screaming Backstage
- Film Clips for Right Place, Wrong Time and Heart of the Matter
