= James Meston =

James Meston may refer to:

- James Meston (musician) (born 1975), Australian radio producer and guitarist
- James Meston, 1st Baron Meston (1865–1943), British civil servant and businessman
- James Meston, 3rd Baron Meston (born 1950), British peer and lawyer
