= Jimi Hocking =

- Also known as: Jimi the Human
- Born: James Kevin Hocking; 7 June 1963 (age 63); Melbourne, Victoria, Australia
- Genres: Hard rock, blues
- Occupation: Musician
- Instruments: Guitar (lead, acoustic), vocals, mandolin, keyboards
- Years active: 1983–present
- Labels: Avenue/EMI, Primitive, Feral, Blah Blah Blah, Black Market Music
- Website: jimihocking.com

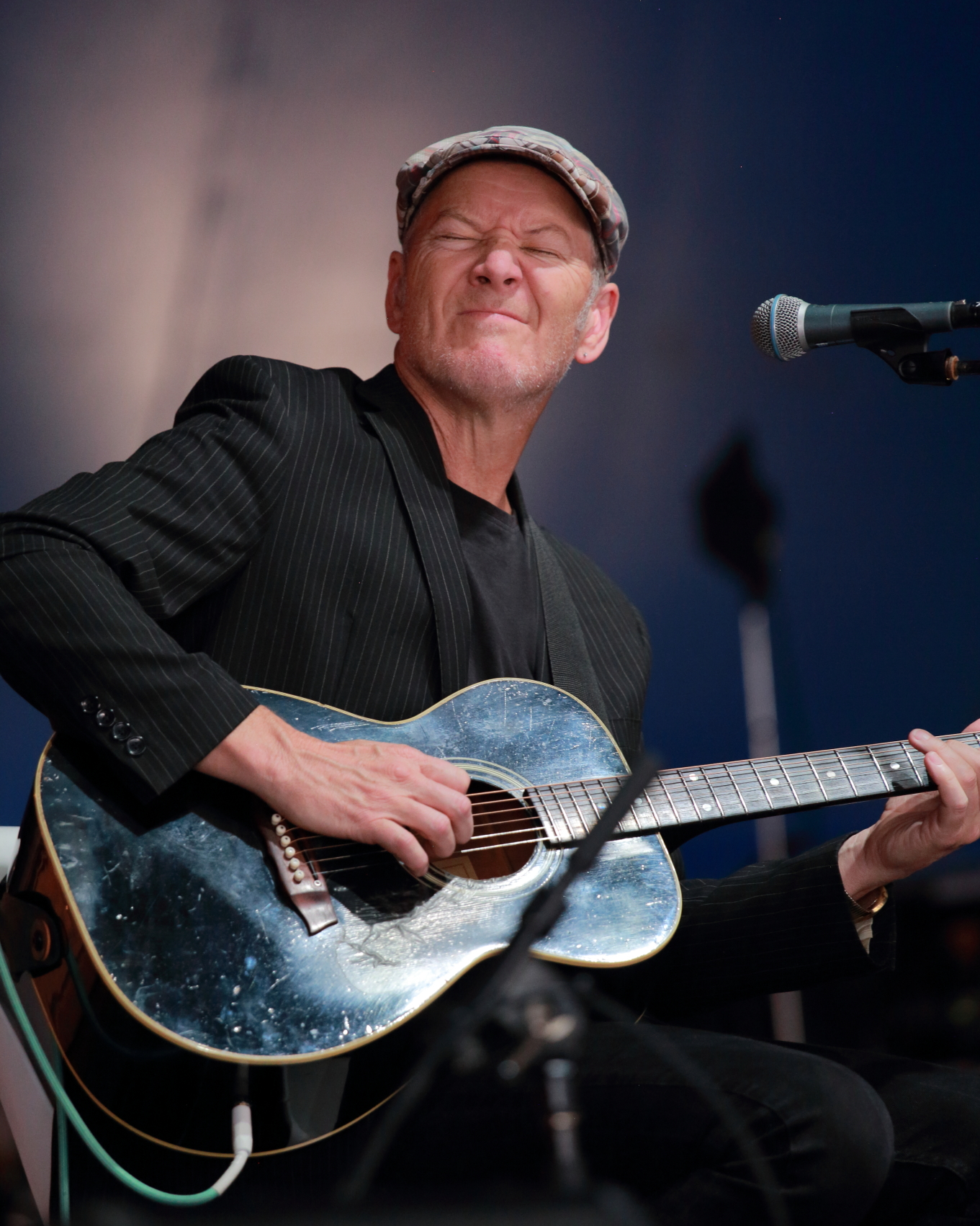
Jimi Hocking performing at Bluesfest Byron Bay, Easter 2025

James Kevin Hocking (born 7 June 1963) otherwise known as Jimi the Human is an Australian musician. He has been a member of hard rock groups, The Angels (1988) and The Screaming Jets (1994–97, 2010–present). As a solo artist he has fronted various backing bands playing hard rock, electric and acoustic blues by providing lead guitar, vocals, mandolin and keyboards. In 2005 he won the Solo/Duo category at the International Blues Challenge in Memphis, Tennessee.

== Biography ==
James Kevin Hocking, was born on 7 June 1963 and grew up in Melbourne. His father, Kevin Hocking, was a pianist, musical director and composer who worked in TV and theatre; while his mother was a singer. Kevin taught his son to play piano but James showed little interest in it. After Hocking was given an acoustic guitar as a Christmas present, he became a self-taught guitarist. He later worked in amateur theatre.

Hocking started performing in groups in Melbourne in 1983. In the following year he formed The Astroboys alongside Peter German (ex-Phantom Band) on bass guitar and vocals, Glen Miles, and Christian Muehlke on drums. He composed and performed the theme for ABC-TV telemovie, Emerging in 1985; and provided guitar session work for the network's series, The D-Generation, in the next year. When performing in cafes Hocking would change his description on the "Who's Playing Board", he related "I started to add silly titles (like) Jimi the Singer, Jimi the Muso ... Eventually I wrote Jimi the Human, a joke about playing any style".

Early in 1986 Hocking, on lead vocals and lead guitar, and German formed The Aströs as a hard rock group with Greg Pedley (ex-Phantom Band) on drums. Hocking also worked on TV series Fame and Misfortune during that year. Also in 1986 The Aströs released a self-titled four-track extended play on Robot Records. It had been recorded live-in-the-studio at Working Class Studios in May. In the next year Hocking, German and Pedley performed as The Housewarmers, however by August The Aströs had reconvened and they toured nationally. They were described by The Canberra Times as a "hard rocking Melbourne band, [which] are ready to rocket on to the Australian music scene".

In May 1988 The Angels' lead guitarist, Bob Spencer, broke his wrist after an on-stage collision with front man, Doc Neeson. The group asked Hocking to temporarily replace Spencer for the remainder of the group's Live Line Tour of Australia. Hocking provided lead guitar and backing vocals. He later recalled "I was called up as the result of some session work I had recently done ... It was originally to fill in for one night and the tour would be cancelled ... The gig went so well, that the band offered me the guitar spot for the rest of the tour, so overnight I found myself on a major rock tour".

In the following year he formed Jimi the Human and Spectre 7, another hard rock group, with former bandmate Muehlke on drums (ex-Honeythieves); they were joined by Josie Jason (ca. 1962–2011) on rhythm guitar and vocals (ex-Butterfly, Final Outcome, Dirty Rats, Mars Needs Women); and Didi Kies on bass guitar (ex-Adventure, Honeythieves). The group signed with Avenue Records which was distributed by EMI. They released their debut album, No Turning Back, in March 1990, which was produced by Peter Blyton (Lime Spiders, The Radiators, Painters and Dockers). It provided two singles, "Quicksand" and "Edge of Insanity". Jason left to form her own band, while Jimi the Human and Spectre 7 sold an album, The Official Bootleg in 1991, at gigs and via mail orders. The group's next album, Living in Luxury, appeared in 1993 on the Primitive Records label. Later that year he relocated to Sydney.

In January of the following year Hocking joined The Screaming Jets replacing founder, Richard Lara. He appeared on two of their studio albums, The Screaming Jets (August 1995) and World Gone Crazy (October 1997), but had left in May 1997. While a member of that band Hocking also issued an acoustic solo album, The Ultimate Bootleg, in August 1996 on Feral Records and Blah Blah Blah Records. After leaving the group he returned to Melbourne, as a solo artist he fronted Jimi Hocking and The Human Condition. They recorded his next album, The Great B-Grade Remake, which appeared in late 1997 on Blah Blah Blah.

Also in 1997, under the name of Jimi Hocking & The Aströs, he released Space Doubt, which contained nine tracks recorded in the mid-1980s and all four tracks from the 1986 EP by the latter named group. Another solo album, Standard Bohemian, followed in March 1998 on Blah Blah Blah, which is an acoustic music-based release. Blue Guitar was issued in 1999 as his first Blues-based album. In June 2012 he told Michael Limnios of Keep the Blues Alive website "I had always heard blues music as I grew up with musical parents, but I started to take it more seriously in the early 1980s when I saw SRV perform ... [then] about 15 years ago, the blues festivals became a lot more viable in Australia, so I put together a blues band".

As of February 2002 Jimi Hocking's Blues Machine included Graham Maddicks on drums and Karl Willebrant on bass guitar. In October 2004 he won the local Melbourne Blues Appreciation Society's Blues Performer of the Year which resulted in an appearance at the 2005 International Blues Challenge in Memphis, Tennessee; where he won the Solo/Duo category. In 2010 he rejoined The Screaming Jets replacing his successor, Ismet "Izzy" Osmanovic, who had left in the previous October. He also continued his solo performances and with his Blues Machine.

== Discography ==
Jimi Hocking is credited with: guitars (lead/electric, rhythm, bass), vocals, mandolin, keyboards.

=== Albums ===
- No Turning Back (by Jimi the Human and Spectre 7) – (March 1990) Avenue Records/EMI
- The Official Bootleg (by Jimi the Human and Spectre 7) – (1991) previously available at gigs and by mail order
- Living in Luxury (by Jimi the Human and Spectre 7) – (1993) Primitive
- The Ultimate Bootleg Vol 1 - (August 1996) Feral Records / Blah Blah Blah Records
- The Great B-Grade Remake (by Jimi and The Human Condition) – (1997)
- Space Doubt (by Jimi & The Aströs) – (1998)
- Standard Bohemian – (3 March 1998) Blah Blah Blah Records
- Blue Guitar – (1999) Black Market Music (record label)
- Based on Actual Events – (2001)
- Give Jimi Some Love – (2002) Black Market Music (record label)
- The Spectre 7 Years – (2004)
- The Ultimate Bootleg Vol 2 – (2005)
- Blue Mandolin – (2007) Black Market Music (record label)
- Electric Mojo Machine – (2009) Black Market Music (record label)
- Live in the Moment (by Jimi Hocking's Blues Machine) – (live album, 2011)
- Live at the Royal Standard Hotel (by Jimi Hocking & Rebecca Davey with Dreamboogie) – (live album, 2013) Black Market Music (record label)
- Blues Roulette (by Jimi Hocking & Blues Roulette) (live album, 2020)
- The Iso EP (with Jesse Valach, Nardia Rose & Blues Roulette) (live album, 2021)
- To The Moon So Blue (2021)
