= Boss (band) =

Australian hard rock band

- Origin: Adelaide, South Australia, Sydney, New South Wales
- Genres: Hard rock; heavy metal
- Years active: 1979–1986
- Label: RCA
- Past members: Craig Csongrady; Kevin Pratt; Pete Sutcliffe; Scott Ginn; Joe Tatts; Dave Ray; Rob Grosser; Kevin McDonald

Boss were a hard rock band, which formed in 1979 in Adelaide. Long-term members were Craig Csongrady on lead vocals and Kevin Pratt on lead guitar. The group issued a sole album, Step on It, in October 1984 before disbanding in 1986. Three members from the final line-up, Csongrady, Pratt and Peter Heckenberg (drums), founded another hard rock group, BB Steal, in 1987.

== History ==
Craig Csongrady, on lead vocals, formed Boss as a hard rock group in Adelaide during 1979. Kevin Pratt soon joined on lead guitar and the group moved to Sydney in 1980. Peter Sutcliffe on guitar, from Dapto, was added to the line-up. Boss commenced a heavy schedule of live performances on the Sydney pub and club circuit. Some of their early performances were at the Astra Hotel, Bondi. In 1983 Boss released a two-track self-titled single, produced by Jon Kennett.

They released a sole album, Step on It, in October 1984, using the line-up of Csongrady, Pratt and Sutcliffe together with Scott Ginn on bass guitar and Joe Tatts on drums. It was produced by Eddie Hansen and co-engineered by Heather Dalton, Spencer Lee and Richard Lush for RCA Records. Australian musicologist, Ian McFarlane, observed that "The band built a solid live reputation in Sydney but could not sell records in Australia. Step on It, however, managed to sell 20000 copies in Germany and Japan." Fans were disappointed to learn that a drum machine was used instead of a real drummer on the album. The group supported shows by Iron Maiden, Twisted Sister, and Ronnie James Dio.

Boss issued four more singles, "Strange Games" (May 1984), "Dancin' Queen" (December 1984), "Shake It" (March 1985) and "Cry Cry" (July). In 1986 the line-up of Csongrady, Pratt, Peter Heckenberg on drums and Laurie Marlowe on bass guitar (ex-Heaven) disbanded. In the following year Csongrady, Heckenberg and Pratt founded another hard rock group, BB Steal, in Sydney. In 2003 Csongrady co-wrote "United Forever", the theme song for Adelaide United FC.

== Members ==
Boss Members

- Craig Csongrady (vocals)
- Kevin Pratt (guitar)
- Scott Tansley (guitar 1981)
- Greg Bailey (guitar 1981-1986)
- Dave Ray (drums 1980-81)
- Rob Grosser (drums 1981-83)
- Kevin McDonald (bass 1981-83)
- Scott Ginn (bass 1984-85)
- Alan Bryant (drums) 1984
- Joe Tatts (drums) 1984
- Peter Heckenberg drums (1985–86)
- Laurie Marlow bass guitar (1986)

== Discography ==
=== Albums ===
List of albums, with selected chart positions
Title	Album details	Peak chart positions
Title	Album details	AUS
Step on It	Released: November 1984; Label: RCA (NFL1-8044)	78

=== Singles ===
- "Boss" (1983) RCA
- "Strange Games" (May 1984)
- "Dancin' Queen" (December 1984)
- "Shake It" (March 1985)
- "Cry Cry" (July 1985)
