= Stop the World (The Screaming Jets song) =

- CD single cover

Single by The Screaming Jets

from the album All for One
- Released: June 1991
- Recorded: 1990
- Studio: Paradise Studios, Sydney
- Length: 4:28
- Label: rooArt
- Songwriter(s): Paul Woseen, Dave Gleeson
- Producer(s): Steve James

The Screaming Jets singles chronology
"Better" (1991)	"Stop the World" (1991)	"Shine On" (1991)

"Stop the World" is a song by Australian rock band The Screaming Jets. The song was released in June 1991 as the second single from their debut studio album All for One (1991). The song peaked at number 33 on the ARIA Charts.

== Track listings ==
CD Single/ 7"

1. "Stop the World" - 4:28
2. "Time and Time" - 2:43

== Charts ==
Chart (1991)	Peak position
Australia (ARIA)	33

== Release history ==
Region	Date	Format	Label	Catalogue
Australia	June 1991	CD Single; 7" Single	rooArt	868276-2 / 868277-7
