= Elvis (...I Remember) =

- CD single cover

Single by The Screaming Jets

from the album World Gone Crazy
- Released: June 1997
- Recorded: 1997
- Studio: Cloud Studio
- Length: 3:54
- Label: rooArt
- Songwriter(s): Grant Walmsley
- Producer(s): Steve James

The Screaming Jets singles chronology
"Sacrifice" (1996)	"Elvis (...I Remember)" (1997)	"Eve of Destruction" (1997)

"Elvis (...I Remember)" is a song by Australian rock band The Screaming Jets. The song was released in June 1997 as the lead single from the band's fourth studio World Gone Crazy (1997). The song peaked at number 71 on the ARIA Charts.

== Track listing ==
1. "Elvis (...I Remember)" – 3:54
2. "Sense" – 3:21
3. "Silence Lost" – 4:20
4. "Fortunate Son" – 2:31

== Charts ==
Chart performance for "Elvis (...I Remember)"
Chart (1997)	Peak position
Australia (ARIA)	71

== Release history ==
Region	Date	Format	Label	Catalogue
Australia	June 1997	CD Single	rooArt	74321495012
