= Tall Tales and True =

- Origin: Sydney, New South Wales, Australia
- Genres: Rock
- Years active: 1983–1999
- Labels: Survival; rooART; WEA
- Past members: Matthew de la Hunty (1983–1999); Paul Miskin (1983–1999); Dave Rashleigh (1984–1999); Willie McCracken (1983); Simon Alcorn (1988–1989); Robert McComb (1989–1990); Dave Goesch (1991); Vanessa Lucas (1991–1992)

Tall Tales and True were an Australian rock band formed in 1983 by Matthew de la Hunty on lead vocals and guitar and Paul Miskin on bass guitar, backing vocals and guitar. They released three studio albums, Shiver (1989), Revenge! (1992, which reached the ARIA top 50) and Tilt (1995). They disbanded in 1999.

== Biography ==
=== 1983–1988: Formation and early recordings ===
Perth-born vocalist and guitarist Matthew de la Hunty relocated to Sydney in 1983 and formed a group with Paul Miskin (bass guitar, backing vocals, guitar) and Willie McCracken (drums). They played one gig at French's Tavern before Dave Rashleigh (drums, backing vocals) replaced McCracken in 1984 and they were named Tall Tales and True. The band became a regular attraction on the inner-city circuit. Engineer/producer Nick Mainsbridge worked with the band on its debut, mini-album Tall Tales and True (on the Survival label), which produced the single "Wasted Life"/"Good Heart Gone Bad" (August 1986). Tall Tales & True issued two four-track singles on Survival, "Up Our Street" (1987) and "You've Got Your Troubles" (1988), before coming to the attention of fledgling independent label rooArt.

=== 1989–1999: rooArt ===
Tall Tales and True contributed a remixed version of "You've Got Your Troubles" to rooArt's inaugural Youngblood compilation (September 1988), alongside material from The Trilobites, Martha's Vineyard, Crash Politics, Hipslingers, The Hummingbirds, Violet Town and others. That led to a full recording contract which resulted in the Shiver album (May 1989). Again produced by Nick Mainsbridge, the album highlighted the dramatic sweep of the band's songwriting and de la Hunty's earnest vocal delivery. Shiver produced the singles "Trust" (January 1989) and "Hold on" (June 1989). Both singles peaked within the ARIA top 70. "Trust" received significant airplay on national youth broadcaster Triple J reaching No. 93 on the Hottest 100 for 1990 and No. 51 in 1991.

In 1989 the band flew to Canada for a three-month tour, which they expanded to a nine-month world tour. The band initially based themselves in Toronto with violinist Simon Alcorn who'd been performing and recording with them. After Canada they went south to the United States, where Alcorn left and was replaced by Robert McComb (The Triffids). The band then moved to the United Kingdom and toured parts of England and Scotland. Tall Tales and True next released the EP Superstition Highway (1991). Rob McComb contributed electric guitar to the blustering title track. The band later added Vanessa Lucas on violin and bass guitar when Rob McComb left. They embarked on the Trilogy tour with rooArt labelmates The Hummingbirds and Canadian band The Pursuit of Happiness. Dave Goesch played lead guitar during this period.

Tall Tales and True issued two new singles, "Lifeboat" and "Summer of Love", the second of which reached No. 51 on the national chart. Both tracks were subsequently included on the band's second album, Revenge (June 1992). Their Lifeboat single earned ARIA nominations for Engineer of the Year (for Nick Mainsbridge) and Best Video (for Brendan Young). Revenge featured tracks uniquely and stylistically recorded, arranged and produced with their favourite producer Nick Mainsbridge in Sydney. The album gave rise to two more singles, "Watching the Wind Blow" (May 1992) and "Looking for a Place" (August 1992), after which the band slipped from view for another two years.

Recorded in a Sydney warehouse in mid-1994 with Mainsbridge, the album Tilt featured the band revisiting its garage-band roots with a noisy, ragged edge to proceedings. Tilt produced two singles, "You Sleep I'll Drive" (June 1994) and "Moonshine" (January 1995). Tall Tales and True played their final show at The Annandale Hotel in 1995. In 1999, following De La Hunty's departure and subsequent solo career, Tall Tales and True officially disbanded.

=== 1999–present: Post breakup ===
Following the break-up of Tall Tales and True, Dave Rashleigh went on to be a member of The Jackson Code, and later Sydney based outfit WEMO.

Paul Miskin formed the band Angel Gear in 1997 which included Dave Rashleigh on drums. They continued to record with Nick Mainsbridge and released Friends in Low Places in 2003 on Mainsbridge's Beat – Route label. He has played bass and toured with Plug Uglies, Margaret Urlich, The Jackson Code and Jodi Phillis. He now writes for and performs with city/country outfits Grandaddy Low and The Richest Men in Town.

Matthew de la Hunty returned to Perth, and released his debut solo album in 1999, Scissors, Paper, Rock, which followed on from the Tall Tales and True sound, but was more acoustic based and rough-edged. This was followed by a second album Welcome to My Rock And Roll World in 2001. He has also undertaken production/remix work for other artists, alongside continuing to record his own material, and lecturing in song writing and production. He formed The Smokin' Eldorados in 2009 with Roddy Radalj (The Scientists, Hoodoo Gurus), performing mainly on lead guitar in the loud, largely improvised rock sound that evolved. His current band Zombie Western Baby is a return to the vocal/guitar sound reminiscent of Tall Tales and True. In Berlin May 2013 he was musical director and performer in the premiere of the dance theatre work "Good Little Soldier".

== Members ==
- Matthew de la Hunty – lead vocals, guitar (1983–1995)
- Paul Miskin – bass, backing vocals, guitar (1983–1995)
- Dave Rashleigh – drums, backing vocals, percussion (1984–1995)
- Willie McCracken – drums, backing vocals (1983)
- Simon Alcorn – violin, guitar (1988–1989)
- Robert McComb – guitar, violin (1989–1990)
- Dave Goesch – guitar (1991)
- Vanessa Lucas – bass, violin (1991–1992)

== Discography ==
=== Albums ===
List of albums, with selected details and chart positions
Title	Details	Peak chart positions	
Title	Details	AUS	US CMJ
Shiver	Released: May 1989; Label: rooArt; Format: LP, CD, Cassette	—	87
Revenge!	Released: June 1992; Label: rooArt; Format: CD, cassette	42	—
Tilt	Released: March 1995; Label: Ra Records; Format: CD, cassette	140	—
That's All Folks	Released: 2001; Label: rooArt; Format: CD; Greatest hits albums (1988-1995)	—	—

=== EPs ===
List of EPs, with selected details and chart positions
Title	Details	Peak chart positions
Title	Details	AUS
Tall Tales and True	Released: 1986; Label: Survival; Format: Vinyl	—
Superstition Highway	Released: March 1991; Label: rooArt; Format: Vinyl, CD	134

=== Singles ===
List of singles, with selected chart positions
Title	Year	Peak chart positions	Album
Title	Year	AUS	Album
"Wasted Life"	1986	—	Tall Tales and True
"Up Our Street"	1987	—	Non-album singles
"You Got Your Troubles"	1987	—	Non-album singles
"Trust"	1988	69	Shiver
"Passing Out the Chains"	1989	—	Shiver
"Hold On"	1989	70	Shiver
"Heart"	1989	—	Shiver
"Lifeboat"	1991	129	Revenge!
"Summer of Love"	1992	51	Revenge!
"Watching the Wind Blow"	1992	53	Revenge!
"Looking for a Place"	1992	96	Revenge!
"You Sleep I'll Drive" / "It's Not Right"	1994	158	Tilt
"Moonshine"	1995	173	Tilt

== Awards and nominations ==
=== ARIA Music Awards ===
The ARIA Music Awards is an annual awards ceremony that recognises excellence, innovation, and achievement across all genres of Australian music. They commenced in 1987.

Year	Nominee / work	Award	Result	Ref.
1990	Shiver	Best New Talent	Nominated	
1992	Nick Mainsbridge for "Lifeboat"	Producer of the Year	Nominated	
1992	Nick Mainsbridge for "Lifeboat"	Engineer of the Year	Nominated	
1992	Brendon Young for "Lifeboat"	Best Video	Nominated	
