= Do Ya (album) =

Studio album by the Screaming Jets
- Released: 13 October 2008
- Recorded: Australia, United States
- Genre: Rock; pub rock
- Length: 38:31
- Label: StockXChange Music, Sony BMG
- Producer: The Screaming Jets and Scott Kingman

The Screaming Jets chronology
Rock On (2005)	Do Ya (2008)	The Essential Screaming Jets (2008)

Singles from Hits and Pieces
- 1. "Do Ya" Released: 2008

Do Ya is the sixth studio album by the Australian hard rock band The Screaming Jets. It was released by StockXChange Music and distributed by Sony BMG. The album was recorded and produced in Australia and the United States and released on 13 October 2008.

it was the first studio album by the band since 2000's Scam.

Band member Dave Gleeson said; "We have not given up hope yet, we want to proudly fly the flag of pub rock. Many of today’s kids are stuck in the iPod generation, where you don’t listen to albums anymore … you hand-pick one song and then skip to another. We want to bring back the feel of listening to an album. We have issues we feel need touching on, look at climate change, even its title had to be watered down due to political correctness, as people are too afraid to call it global warming. Look at our fat-cat politicians – they decided to round up all our homeless during the Olympics, so visitors couldn’t see the plight of our homeless. There are so many other issues out there that need to be touched on, but kids of today, prefer to listen to a Katy Perry song about kissing a girl, go figure."

On lead single "Do Ya", Izzy Osmanovic says; ""Do Ya" was written one night on my way to rehearsals. I had this tune in my head and by the time I got to the rehearsal room I said to the guys: 'Hey, I’ve got this riff and melody in my head, I haven't played it on guitar yet but give me five minutes and I'll work it out.' And that was that, we created a monster. The story to the song is about a mate of mine who got married, only be told not long after that his missus doesn't love him anymore.".

== Track listing ==
No.	Title	Writer(s)	Length
1.	"Do Ya"	Gleeson, Osmanovic	2:35
2.	"Supersize"	Gleeson, Grant Walmsley	3:12
3.	"Change the World"	Gleeson, Walmsley	2:52
4.	"Mary Jane"	Gleeson, Walmsley	3:35
5.	"Running Blind"	Gleeson, Osmanovic, Paul Woseen	3:19
6.	"Inside Out"	Gleeson, Osmanovic, Woseen	3:23
7.	"Falls in Place"	Woseen	3:56
8.	"141"	Gleeson, Walmsley, Greg Bryce	3:04
9.	"Knock Knock"	Woseen	2:55
10.	"Stay"	Woseen	4:05
11.	"Heave"
Total length:			38:31

== Charts ==
Chart performance for Do Ya
Chart (2008)	Peak position
Australian Albums (ARIA)	114

== Release history ==
Region	Date	Format(s)	Label	Catalogue
Australia	13 October 2008	Digital download, CD	StockXChange Music, Sony BMG	88697400952
