= The Mandelbrot Set =

Australian band

The Mandelbrot Set were an indie/powerpop band from Adelaide, South Australia, who rose to prominence during the "shoegaze" era of the early 1990s. They released two EPs through Ra Records (a subsidiary of rooArt) before their break-up in 1994.

== History ==
The band formed in 1990 (following the closure of former band, The Artistic Fishermen, 1986–90, featuring Chris Salt on bass & Phil Pippett on drums) when school friends Tim Mortimer (guitar/vocals) and Brian Pyper (guitar) met Adam McBeath (ex-Artisans), a guitarist who agreed to join on bass. With the addition of drummer Michael Bajer, plus occasional violinist Christie Scardigno, the line-up was settled.

Featuring a 12-string Rickenbacker guitar sound reminiscent of The Church, and with early Tim Mortimer songs inspired by R.E.M and Rain Parade, the band gained popularity on Adelaide community radio station Triple M (now 3D Radio) with a locally recorded demo, "Joy in Despair", before expanding their sound to embrace the new effects-laden bands coming from England's Creation Records.

Further local radio hits "Dream So Hard" and "More Than Happy" followed before a final demo, "Massive" (an Adam McBeath song), saw them experimenting with sampling technology. By 1991, gigs featured fog machines and elaborate light shows, and drew crowds from both the rock and fledgling dance scenes. Also in ’91, a re-recorded "Dream So Hard" appeared on the rooArt Youngblood III compilation, alongside Underground Lovers, Ripe and Glide, and the band played national youth radio network Triple J’s Live at the Wireless after winning the "J Sessions" (the nineties equivalent of Unearthed).

In 1992, having been Adelaide's "next big thing" since their inception, the Mandelbrot Set signed to Sydney label Ra Records and released a 7-song EP, A Place Called Kansas. Unfortunately the songs the label chose to record were by then out of date, did not reflect the band's live sound and were over-familiar to a fanbase which, in many cases, preferred the original demos.

A second EP, The Mandelbrot Set, followed, wherein Tim Mortimer took centre stage, programming the bulk of the arrangements on an early digital sampler and embracing influences from New Order to the Jesus and Mary Chain. In the end, with sales for the second EP roughly half that of the first, and complaining of having been rushed through the recording, the band faltered and lost momentum just as east coast label-mates You Am I cracked the charts; the label lost interest.

The Mandelbrot Set split in 1994, by which time the brief period of indie ascendancy in Adelaide—started by the Artisans in 1989—had passed and grunge was the order of the day.

== Post Break-Up ==
Tim Mortimer played bass in Truck Train Tractor in 1994, guitar in Salo in 1995 and bass / guitar / samples in the American Public from 2000 to 2001. He now records solo ambient, pop and instrumental music.

After taking a long hiatus, Adam McBeath plays guitar in Swimsuit.

Michael Bajer drummed in Fiona Beverage and Studio Mojo before his death in 1999.

== Influence ==
In Adelaide, the Mandelbrot Set are acknowledged as forefathers of a scene that includes the Retreads, Straight to Video, the Avant Gardeners and No Through Road.

The Artistic Fisherman were acknowledged as a heavy influence on All Flight Crew are Dead, You Am I, Powderfinger & Silverchair. Peter Garrett, Michael Stipe, Robert Smith, Morrissey & Bono all speak about TAF glowingly when referencing the greatest bands that never got a record deal.

== Discography ==
- Young Blood 1991, rooArt
- A Place Called Kansas, 1992, Ra Records
- The Mandelbrot Set, 1993, Ra Records
