= James Meston (musician) =

Australian media personality

James Meston (born 1975) is an Australian, Adelaide-based radio producer, announcer and podcaster. He has produced and co-announced the 'Arch D Radio' show on 1079 Life FM from 2011-2026 and produced a number of series of podcasts related to Catholic education and Catholic spirituality since 2019. In March 2026, he won three NYC Podcasting Awards for his 4-part documentary podcast series “Footsteps of Faith: A Celtic Pilgrimage”.

From 1993 to 2017 he was a blues guitarist with the stage name "Sweet Baby James", who was named as Official Ambassador of the 2007 Australian Blues Festival. He has played onstage with Jeff Healey and Sue Foley.

In 1997, he moved to London, England, and regularly worked with David Hadley-Ray, Pete Brown and a short stint with The Big Town Playboys, filling in for regular guitarist Andy Fairweather Low while he was on tour with Eric Clapton in 1998.

Meston worked as both a trio and, from 2002, as a duo with drummer Rob Eyers in Sweet Baby James and Rob Eyers. They released a 2005 album Rhythm 'n' Blues (Black Market Music), followed in 2010 with Double Voodoo Blues.
