= BB Steal =

- Origin: Australia
- Genre: Melodic rock
- Years active: 1987-

BB Steal (Beg Borrow Steal) are a heavily Def Leppard-influenced Australian band formed circa 1987. Lead vocalist Craig Csongrady has been the only permanent member.

The band originally featured former Boss members lead vocalist Craig Csongrady and guitarist Kevin Pratt, as well as guitarist Warren Mason, bassist Peter Stanton, and drummer Peter Heckenberg.

BB Steal featured, during the course of 1991, drummer Craig Rosevear, who later went on to play with the Screaming Jets.

A later line-up of the band featured Csongrady, guitarist Shane Grahovac, guitarist Mark Lloyd, bassist Josh Biggs, and drummer Louis Halkias.

Def Leppard guitarist and Man Raze lead vocalist and guitarist Phil Collen produced the title song on their Heartbeat Away EP and co-produced their first full-length album On The Edge, which also features a version of the song "Heartbeat Away". There are reports that he also played some guitar and sang backing vocals on On The Edge, though he was never officially a member of the band.

BB Steal opened for Def Leppard during the Adrenalize Tour. First opening for Def Leppard on 11 July 1992 in Perth Australia.

== Discography ==
=== Albums ===
List of albums, with selected chart positions
Title	Album details	Peak chart positions
Title	Album details	AUS
On the Edge	Released: June 1992; Format: CD, Cassette; Label: Phonogram (848045-2)	144
Resurrection	Released: 2006; Format: CD, Digital download; Label: Global Riot Records (GLOBAL 002)	

=== Singles ===
List of singles, with selected chart positions
Year	Title	Peak chart positions	Album
Year	Title	AUS	Album
1988	"I Believe"	128	non album single
1988	"Heartbeat Away"	68	On the Edge
1989	"Love and Leave Me"	-	On the Edge
1991	"Ride On"	-	On the Edge
1991	"Live It Up "	-	On the Edge
1992	"Big Love"	145	On the Edge
