= Individuality (song) =

- CD single cover

Single by The Screaming Jets

from the album Hits and Pieces & Scam
- Released: June 1999
- Recorded: 1999
- Length: 3:58
- Label: Grude Records
- Songwriter(s): Grant Walmsley

The Screaming Jets singles chronology
"I Need Your Love" (1999)	"Individuality" (1999)	"Shine Over Me" (2000)

"Individuality" is a song by Australian rock band The Screaming Jets. The song was released in June 1999 as the second and single from the band's greatest hits album Hits and Pieces (1999). The song was also included on the band's fifth studio album Scam (2000). The song peaked at number 67 on the ARIA Charts.

== Track listing ==
CD single

1. "Individuality" - 3:58
2. "No Way Out" - 2:32
3. "Body Bag" - 2:02
4. "Individuality" (Original demo version) - 3:51

== Charts ==
Chart performance for "Individuality"
Chart (1999)	Peak position
Australia (ARIA)	67

== Release history ==
Region	Date	Format	Label	Catalogue
Australia	June 1999	CD Single	Grudge Records	1563192
