= All for One (The Screaming Jets album) =

Studio album by the Screaming Jets
- Released: 19 April 1991
- Recorded: 1990
- Genre: Rock, pub rock
- Length: 47:42
- Label: rooArt
- Producer: Steve James

The Screaming Jets chronology
The Scorching Adventures of the Screaming Jets (1990)	All for One (1991)	Living in England (1992)

Singles from All for One
- 1. "Better" Released: February 1991; 2. "Stop the World" Released: June 1991; 3. "Shine On" Released: September 1991; 4. "F.R.C." Released: 1991

The Screaming Jets chronology
Dirty Thirty (2019)	All for One (30 Year Anniversary Edition) (2021)	Professional Misconduct (2023)

All for One is the debut album by Australian hard rock band the Screaming Jets, released in April 1991. It peaked at No. 2 on the ARIA Charts.

The album was re-recorded in 2021 and released in October 2021 as All for One (30 Year Anniversary Edition), which debuted at number 4 on the ARIA Charts.

== Background ==
The Screaming Jets are a hard rock group that formed in January 1989 in Newcastle with singer Dave Gleeson, drummer Brad Heaney, guitarist Richard Lara, guitarist Grant Walmsley and bass guitarist Paul Woseen. Their first performance was at a Newcastle pub in March. The band won the inaugural National Band Competition run by youth radio broadcaster Triple J in November. They relocated to Sydney by early 1990 and supported the Angels on a national tour. In May, they signed with independent label, rooArt. Their debut extended play (EP), The Scorching Adventures of the Screaming Jets, was issued in December.

In April 1991, the Screaming Jets released their debut studio album All for One which peaked at No. 2 on the Australian Recording Industry Association (ARIA) Albums Chart. It was produced by Steve James and released by rooArt in Australia, Germany and United States as a CD, cassette and LP album. The US release has an alternative cover. It reached the Top 50 on the ARIA End of Year Albums Chart for 1991.

The album's lead single, "Better", peaked at number 4 on the ARIA Singles Chart. Two top 40 singles, "Stop the World" and "Shine On" followed. The controversial track "F.R.C." ("Fat Rich Cunts") was a crowd favourite and released in USA and Canada, But due to its use of explicit language, the song was not included on the US/Canada release of “All For One.” Gleeson would dedicate the song to Michael Gudinski or Russ Hinze at concerts. At times, "F.R.C." was performed by guest vocalists from Mortal Sin, the Choirboys or the Angels.

Following the album's release, the group relocated to the United Kingdom where they based themselves for over two years. They toured there, the rest of Europe and the US as they supported varied hard rock and heavy metal bands.

== Reception ==
Professional ratings
Review scores
Source	Rating
AllMusic	3/5 stars

According to Australian rock music historian, Ian McFarlane, All for One "was a cogent and energetic release, one of the strongest debuts from an Australian hard rock band. Reference points for the album's gritty rock'n'roll included the flash of early Van Halen mixed with the traditional thunder of AC/DC and The Angels".

== Track listing ==
No.	Title	Writer(s)	Length
1.	"C'Mon"	David Gleeson, Richard Lara	2:49
2.	"No Point"	Paul Woseen	4:17
3.	"Better"	Grant Walmsley	4:38
4.	"Needle"	Woseen	3:50
5.	"Shine On"	Woseen	6:08
6.	"Starting Out"	Walmsley	4:04
7.	"Stop the World"	Woseen, Gleeson	4:25
8.	"Blue Sashes"	Walmsley, Greg Bryce	3:30
9.	"Sister Tease"	Woseen, Dan Lennox	3:18
10.	"F.R.C." (aka Fat Rich Cunts)	Woseen	3:18
11.	"Got It" (bonus track)	Woseen	3:43
12.	"The Only One" (bonus track)	Walmsley, Gleeson	3:11

== Charts and certifications ==
=== Weekly charts ===
Chart (1991)	Peak position
Australian Albums (ARIA)	2
Chart (2021)	Peak position
Australian Albums (ARIA)	4

=== Year-end charts ===
Chart (1991)	Position
Australian Albums Chart	48
Australian Artist Albums Chart	15

=== Certifications ===
Region	Certification	Certified units/sales
Australia (ARIA)	Gold	35,000^{^}
^{^} Shipments figures based on certification alone.

== Release details ==
Format	Country	Label	Catalogue No.	Year
LP	Australia	rooArt	848441-1	19 April 1991
Cassette	Europe	rooArt	848441-4	1991
CD	Australia	rooArt	9031776522	1991
CD	Germany, UK, US	rooArt	848441-2	1991

== Personnel ==
The Screaming Jets

- Dave Gleeson – vocals
- Richard Lara – guitar, backing vocals
- Grant Walmsley – guitar, backing vocals
- Paul Woseen – bass guitar, backing vocals
- Brad Heaney – drums

Recording details

- Engineer – David Price
- Mastering – Don Bartley
- Mixing – David Hemming, Steve James
- Producer – Steve James
- Studios – Paradise Studios (production), Rhino Studios (mixing), Studios 301 (mastering). Sydney, Australia
