= Gotcha Covered =

Studio album by The Screaming Jets
- Released: 27 July 2018
- Recorded: 2018
- Studio: Sing Sing
- Length: 62:53
- Label: Dinner for Wolves
- Producer: Steve James

The Screaming Jets chronology
| Chrome (2016) | Gotcha Covered (2018) | Dirty Thirty (2019) |

Singles from Gotcha Covered
- 1. "Wedding Ring" Released: 5 July 2018

Gotcha Covered is the eighth studio album by Australian rock back The Screaming Jets. The album features The Screaming Jets covering 15 iconic Australian songs spanning the mid 1960s to late 1990s. The album was supported by a national tour. Upon release, singer and lead singer Dave Gleeson said “What we came up with was a great Aussie party album. Covering songs that have shaped us; songs from our youth; songs that have been written and performed by contemporaries and songs that will make even the most loyal fan go “what the”.”

The band showcased the entire album on the 3rd and 4th of August 2018 at The Bridge Hotel, Sydney.

== Reception ==
Nick Barrett from Overdrive Magazine said "Gotcha Covered is an incredibly satisfying, well-constructed and sensationally enjoyable covers album. Each and every track has a reason for being on the album and The Screaming Jets have somewhat mystifyingly kept most of the content sounding fresh and unique. The song selection is eclectic enough that it will appeal to a variety of audiences, while also introducing listeners to songs they may not have heard before. The phenomenal performances, track-listing and production quality on Gotcha Covered make the album one worth listening to on repeat." Jeff Jenkins from Stack Magazine called the album "a love letter to Oz rock."

== Track listing ==
| No. | Title | Writer(s) | Length |
|---|---|---|---|
| 1. | "Wedding Ring" (The Easybeats song) | Stevie Wright; George Young; Harry Vanda | 2:29 |
| 2. | "The Razor's Edge" (Goanna song) | Shane Howard; Ian Morrison | 3:52 |
| 3. | "Gimme Head" (The Radiators' song) | Geoff Turner | 2:48 |
| 4. | "Overkill" (Men at Work song) | Colin Hay | 3:44 |
| 5. | "Darling It Hurts" (Paul Kelly and the Coloured Girls song) | Paul Kelly; Steve Connolly | 3:43 |
| 6. | "The Right Time" (Hoodoo Gurus song) | Dave Faulkner | 3:47 |
| 7. | "Walls" (Flowers song) | Iva Davies | 4:19 |
| 8. | "Purple Sneakers" (You Am I song) | Rusty Hopkinson; Andy Kent; Tim Rogers | 3:50 |
| 9. | "Aloha Steve and Danno" (Radio Birdman song) | Rob Younger; Denis Tek; Mort Stevens | 3:31 |
| 10. | "Shadow Boxer" (The Angels song) | Doc Neeson; John Brewster; Rick Brewster | 2:33 |
| 11. | "This Time" (INXS song) | Andrew Farriss | 3:12 |
| 12. | "Errol" (Australian Crawl song) | James Reyne; Guy McDonough | 3:27 |
| 13. | "Rain" (Dragon song) | Johanna Pigott; Todd Hunter; Marc Hunter | 3:50 |
| 14. | "Rock 'n' Roll Damnation" (AC/DC song) | Angus Young; Malcolm Young; Bon Scott | 3:33 |
| 15. | "Guitar Band" (Stevie Wright song) | G. Young; Vanda; Wright | 14:15 |
| Total length: | | | 62:53 |

== Charts ==
| Chart (2018) | Peak position |
|---|---|
| Australian Albums (ARIA) | 17 |

== Release history ==
| Country | Date | Format | Label | Catalogue |
|---|---|---|---|---|
| Australia | 27 July 2018 | CD; digital download | Dinner for Wolves | TV189 |
