= Professional Misconduct (album) =

Studio album by the Screaming Jets
- Released: 6 October 2023
- Studio: Red Engine Studios (Manly, Queensland); Sing Sing Recording Studios (Melbourne, Victoria)
- Length: 35:15
- Label: Shine On
- Producer: Steve James

The Screaming Jets chronology
All for One (30 Year Anniversary Edition) (2021)	Professional Misconduct (2023)

Singles from Professional Misconduct
- 1. "Nothing to Lose" Released: 21 July 2023; 2. "Second Chance" Released: 9 August 2023

Professional Misconduct is the tenth studio album by Australian rock group the Screaming Jets, released on 6 October 2023. The album was announced on 21 July 2023, alongside the release of lead single "Nothing to Lose" and announcement of forthcoming tour dates. Explaining the title, David Gleeson said; "Misconduct" is frowned upon by polite society. We embrace it and have made it our profession."

The album was released less than a month after bassist and songwriter Paul Woseen died on 15 September; the album is dedicated to him.

== Reception ==
Jeff Jenkins writing for Stack Magazine said "This is classic Jets, with a couple of curveballs." Jenkins also wrote that "these are songs for the end of the working week, when 'getting through the day is all you're thinking of', and all you wanna do is put on a record and turn it up loud. The album climaxes with 'Speed Quack', a blazing ball of energy."

Brian Giffen from Hot Metal Mag said "Part swaggering rock, part thoughtful ballads, ending with a blaze of riffs, this is an album that is quintessentially the Jets. The songs are workaday tales of love, loss and everyday pleasures and frustrations, easily relatable yarns that have long formed the core of The Screaming Jets material."

== Track listing ==
Professional Misconduct track listing
No.	Title	Writer(s)	Length
1.	"Nothing to Lose"	Scott Kingman, Paul Woseen	3:24
2.	"Come Down"	Dave Gleeson, Kingman, Woseen	3:05
3.	"No Reason"	Woseen	3:15
4.	"Second Chance"	Gleeson, Woseen	4:14
5.	"Throwing Shade"	Kingman, Woseen	3:24
6.	"Lying with Her"	Steve Balbi, Gleeson	3:44
7.	"Shadows"	Kingman, Woseen	3:40
8.	"Crash Out of Time"	Kingman, Woseen	3:05
9.	"Give Me What I Want"	Kingman, Woseen	4:26
10.	"Speed Quack"	Kingman, Woseen	2:58
Total length:			35:15

== Charts ==
Chart performance for Professional Misconduct
Chart (2023)	Peak position
Australian Albums (ARIA)	3
