= The Trilobites =

Australian power pop band

- Origin: Sydney, New South Wales, Australia
- Genres: Power pop, rock
- Years active: 1984–1992
- Labels: Citadel; Waterfront rooArt; Big Time; Normal
- Past members: see Members list

The Trilobites were an Australian power pop band formed in Sydney in June 1984. The original members of the Trilobites were Mike Dalton on vocals, Scott Leighton on bass guitar, Martin Martini and Paul Skates on guitars and Paul Styman on drums. Their first two singles, "Venus in Leather"' and "American TV", reached number 1 on the alternative chart. They released three albums, Turn it Around in 1987, Savage Mood Swing in 1990 and The Lost Generation in 1992.

== History ==
Vocalist Mike Dalton and drummer Paul Styman played together in a high school band, The Pyschotics, in the late 1970s. Bass guitarist Scott Leighton celebrated his 21st birthday in 1984 by showcasing his new band, The United Underworld. Included in The United Underworld were Martin Martini on rhythm guitar, Paul Skates on lead guitar and Paul Styman on drums and Steven Stradbrook on Vocals. Shortly after this performance Dalton was asked to join as vocalist. All members had attended the same high school together, Sydney Technical High School, albeit in different grades. They soon changed their name to The Trilobites and began gigging in Sydney's plethora of suburban and inner city pubs and clubs. They debuted on 20 June 1984, at the Vulcan Hotel in Ultimo (incidentally same as the debut of The Hard Ons). Their first release was a live cassette only album, Let's Pump, self-released on Atomic Records. Later, The Citadel label issued the band's first two singles: "Venus in Leather" (1985) and "American T.V." (1986). Both singles reached No. 1 on the alternative charts, and the band toured to a strong response . Both songs appeared on the Citadel's compilation album Take Everything, Leave Nothing (March 1988). In the meantime, the Trilobites had signed a new deal with the Big Time label which resulted in the single, "Night of the Many Deaths" (May 1987).

On 24 October 1987 The Trilobites decided to record their show at The Caringbah Inn and turn it into a live LP, Turn It Around. It was released on the Waterfront label and only as a vinyl release. Waterfront also put out the Trilobites fourth single, "Jenny's Wake" (June 1988). In 1988 the Trilobites came to the attention of the fledgling rooArt label. The band contributed "All Hail the New Right" to rooArt inaugural Youngblood compilation album. That led to a full recording contract which resulted in the release of their EP, I Can't Wait for the Summer to End which gained strong success on the American college radio circuit. During March 1989, The Trilobites' debut studio album, Savage Mood Swing was produced by Englishman, Steve James (Toyah, The Lambrettas, John Otway) and released in March 1990. Between recording the album and its release, the Trilobites also undertook a successful European tour (late 1989). The album was also released in the United States on the Polygram label, with a promised tour of the States. In 1991, following rooART's last minute decision to pull the band's U.S. tour, Dalton left the band to take employment at MTV Australia. and was replaced by Gary Slater (Voodoo Lust). Paul Styman left at this point to be replaced by Glenn Abbott.

This version of the band then released a single, "Tears You Apart/Don't Hide", and a six track mini-LP on vinyl. These songs formed the basis of their second album, The Lost Generation, which was produced by Rob Younger (Radio Birdman, New Christs). It was released in February 1992 by Citadel and became the band's final release. The original line-up re-formed for a series of Sydney shows in 1996.

- Gary Slater returned to Brisbane and performed in bands including The Pot Monsters and Grumpy, later rejoining Voodoo Lust.
- Glenn Abbott joined Machine Gun Fellatio and had another band The Bryan Ferrysexual Experience which broke up shortly after MGF did. He later formed Super Massive with singer-writer Malina Hamilton-Smith. Super Massive have released an EP and several singles and toured to Vietnam twice. Abbott is still actively gigging with many different artists and has produced a track for the original Wiggles and Soul Movers in 2020 .
- Martin Martini joined Spurs For Jesus & The Upsets
- Michael Dalton has been a producer and reporter at Channel 9 since 1993 and has worked on numerous shows including the NRL 'Footy Show', 'Good Morning Australia' and 'A Current Affair'
- Scott Leighton joined Mushroom Planet, replacing long-time bassist Tony Bambach. He has recently been playing in Bahne Super-Flex, a Sydney covers band with fellow Trilobite Mike Dalton on vocals

== Members ==
- Glenn Abbott – drums (1991–1992)
- Mike Dalton – vocals (1984–1991)
- Scot Leighton – bass guitar (1984–1992)
- Martin Martini – rhythm guitar (1984–1992)
- Paul Skates – lead guitar (1984–1992)
- Gary Slater – vocals (1991–1992)
- Paul Styman – drums (1984–1989)

== Discography ==
=== Cassette ===
- Let's Pump – Atomic Records (Self Released) (December 1984)

=== Albums/EPs ===
- Turn it Around – Waterfront (December 1987)
- I Can't Wait for Summer to End (EP) – rooArt (March 1989)
- American TV (EP) – Citadel/Normal (1989)
- Savage Mood Swing – rooArt (March 1990)
- The Lost Generation – Citadel (February 1992)

=== Singles ===
- "Venus in Leather"/"Amphetamine Dream" – Citadel (October 1985)
- "American TV"/"Legacy of Morons" – Citadel (August 1986)
- "Night of the Many Deaths"/"Living by a Different Yardstick" – Big Time Records (May 1987)
- "Jenny's Wake"/"I Can See" – Waterfront (June 1988)
- "All Hail The New Right" split EP with Tall Tales and True – rooArt (1988)
- "Fuck = Love"/"Little Death"/"Legacy of Morons – Remix" 12" vinyl – rooArt (September 1989)
- "New Head"/"Savage Mood Swing" – rooART (November 1989)
- "Minibar of Oblivion"/"Attack of the Yes Man" 7" and 12" vinyl – rooART (February 1990)
- "Don't Hide"/"Tear You Apart" – Citadel (October 1991)
