= Friend of Mine (The Screaming Jets song) =

- CD single cover

Single by The Screaming Jets

from the album The Screaming Jets
- Released: October 1995
- Recorded: 1995
- Length: 4:54
- Label: rooArt
- Songwriter(s): Paul Woseen

The Screaming Jets singles chronology
"Sad Song" (1995)	"Friend of Mine" (1995)	"Sacrifice" (1996)

"Friend of Mine" is a song by Australian rock band The Screaming Jets. The song was released in October 1995 as the second single from their third studio and self titled studio album (1995). The song peaked at number 44 on the ARIA Charts.

== Track listings ==
CD Single

1. "Friend of Mine" - 3:41
2. "Sad Song" (live) - 2:59
3. "Life and Death" (live) - 3:47
4. "Disappear" (live) - 3:24
- Tracks 2, 3 & 4 Recorded at the Kirk Gallery for Triple J "Live at the Wireless" on 15 August 1995.

== Charts ==
Chart (1995)	Peak position
Australia (ARIA)	44

== Release history ==
Region	Date	Format	Label	Catalogue
Australia	October 1995	CD Single	rooArt	2068300001
