= Dirty thirty (Vietnam) =

The Dirty Thirty
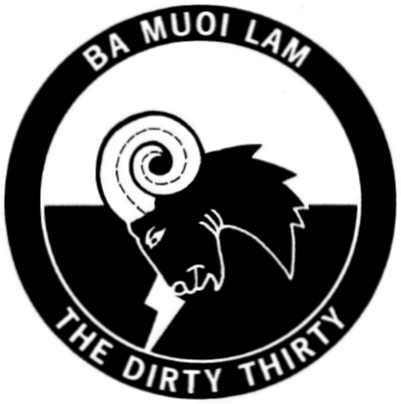
- Active: 1962–1964
- Country: United States of America
- Branch: United States Air Force
- Role: Training and Air Commando
- Engagements: Vietnam War

The first U.S. airmen to take an official role in the Vietnam War were a group of pilots called the Dirty Thirty. They were U.S. Air Force pilots sent to Vietnam in 1962 and 1963, to assist the South Vietnamese air force (VNAF) in military airlift and transport missions. They primarily flew as co-pilots alongside VNAF pilots on these missions.

Other G.I.s had survived in Vietnam and had participated in combat operations. Officially, however the Dirty Thirty (an unofficial adopted nickname) pilots were classed as "advisors", not combatants.

The original group of pilots deployed in 1962 rotated home during early 1963, and were replaced by a second contingent. During the 20-month period they were on loan to the VNAF, the total of sixty Dirty Thirty pilots flew approximately 25,000 hours, earning 97 Air Medals and two Distinguished Flying Crosses.

Richard W. Hudson wrote a book about the pilots, entitled "The Dirty Thirty".

== History ==
In April 1962, 30 U.S. Air Force pilots were sent to fly as advisors in the Republic of Vietnam Air Force (VNAF) 43rd Air Transport Group at Tan Son Nhut Air Base. Their arrival permitted the VNAF to release some of its own experienced pilots to form new units for its rapidly expanding air arm.

This small group of Americans usually served as co-pilots in VNAF C-47 transports. Missions included flare drops, airborne assaults, airborne resupply, leaflet drops, loudspeaker broadcasts, and cargo and troop movements.

Additional USAF personnel arrived at Tan Son Nhut in early 1962 after the VNAF transferred two dozen seasoned pilots from the 1st Transportation Group at Tan Son Nhut to provide aircrews for the newly activated 2nd Fighter Squadron then undergoing training at Bien Hoa Air Base. This sudden loss of qualified C-47 pilots brought the 1st Transportation Group's airlift capability dangerously low.

In order to alleviate the problem, United States Secretary of Defense Robert McNamara, on the recommendation of the Military Assistance Advisory Group (MAAG) Vietnam, ordered thirty USAF pilots temporarily assigned to the VNAF to serve as C-47 co-pilots. This influx of U.S. personnel quickly returned the 1st TG to full strength.

The Americans arrived at Tan Son Nhut during March and April 1962 and immediately began flying with Vietnamese crews. Unfortunately, problems arose between the Americans and Vietnamese and by August the situation had so deteriorated that the 1st Transportation Group commander. Nguyễn Cao Kỳ urgently appealed for closer cooperation and understanding between the two groups. The situation seemed to gradually improve and although there were still problems, the two groups developed a closer working relationship.

Unlike the USAF Farm Gate personnel at Bien Hoa Air Base, the C-47 co-pilots actually became part of the VNAF operational structure — though still under U.S. control. Because of their rather unusual situation, these pilots soon adopted the very unofficial nickname, The Dirty Thirty.

In a sense they were the first U.S. airmen actually committed to combat in Vietnam, rather than being assigned as advisors or support personnel.

The original Dirty Thirty pilots eventually rotated home during early 1963 and were replaced by a second contingent of American pilots. This detachment remained with the VNAF until December 1963 when they were withdrawn from Vietnam.
