= The Screaming Jets (album) =

Studio album by the Screaming Jets
- Released: August 1995
- Recorded: 1995
- Genre: Rock; pub rock
- Length: 40:41
- Label: rooArt
- Producer: Robbie Adams, the Screaming Jets

The Screaming Jets chronology
Tear of Thought (1992)	The Screaming Jets (1995)	World Gone Crazy (1997)

Singles from The Screaming Jets
- 1. "Sad Song" Released: July 1995; 2. "Friend of Mine" Released: October 1995; 3. "Sacrifice" Released: 1996

The Screaming Jets is a self-titled, third studio album released by the Australian rock band the Screaming Jets. The album was released in August 1995 and debuted and peaked at number 5 on the ARIA charts and was certified gold.

== Reviews ==
Jonathan Lewis of AllMusic said, "It's no coincidence that The Screaming Jets chose to self-title their third album. For The Screaming Jets, the band changed their approach somewhat, introducing more thoughtful lyrics and toning down the metal aspect of their music. The change is a good one, and this is a much more mature effort from the band. As a group they are tighter than ever and the quality of their songwriting has improved noticeably from their two previous outings. But changing a successful formula, regardless of how good a change it is, is always going to alienate fans. The Screaming Jets failed to live up to the success of its predecessor but [is] Screaming Jets' best. "

== Track listing ==
No.	Title	Writer(s)	Length
1.	"Figure it Out"	Dave Gleeson, Grant Walmsley	3:45
2.	"Sacrifice"	Gleeson, Walmsley, Paul Woseen	3:09
3.	"Sad Song"	Walmsley	2:55
4.	"High as a Kite"	Gleeson, Walmsley	3:45
5.	"Otherside"	Woseen	3:36
6.	"Disappear"	Gleeson, Woseen	2:49
7.	"Blood Shed"	Walmsley	3:30
8.	"Impossible"	Walmsley	3:10
9.	"Friend of Mine"	Woseen	3:41
10.	"Life and Death"	Walmsley	3:54
11.	"Reefer Madness"	Gleeson, Walmsley	3:31
12.	"In a Jam"	Walmsley	2:52

== Charts ==
Chart (1995)	Peak position
Australian Albums (ARIA)	5

== Certifications ==
Region	Certification	Certified units/sales
Australia (ARIA)	Gold	35,000^{^}
^{^} Shipments figures based on certification alone.

== Band members ==
- Dave Gleeson – vocals
- Paul Woseen – bass guitar, backing vocals
- Jimi "The Human" Hocking – guitar
- Craig Rosevear – drums
- Grant Walmsley – guitar, backing vocals
