= The Scorching Adventures of the Screaming Jets =

EP by the Screaming Jets
- Released: 12 November 1990
- Recorded: 1990
- Studios: Paradise Studios, Sydney
- Genres: Rock; pub rock
- Label: rooArt
- Producer: Steve James

The Screaming Jets chronology
The Scorching Adventures of the Screaming Jets (1990)	All for One (1991)

Singles from The Scorching Adventures of the Screaming Jets
- 1. "C'Mon" Released: 1990

The Scorching Adventures of the Screaming Jets EP is the debut release by Australian pub rock band the Screaming Jets, released in December 1990.

The Screaming Jets won a national Battle of the Bands contest run by the Triple J network in 1989 and won time in a recording studio to release this EP in 1990.

The song "C'Mon" earned the Screaming Jets a nomination for 'best new talent' at the ARIA Music Awards of 1991. The song lost to Archie Roach's - "Charcoal Lane"

A variant of the artwork for the EP was used on the American release of the band's debut album All for One in 1991.

== Track listing ==
CD/Cassette/Vinyl 878 434-7
No.	Title	Writer(s)	Length
1.	"C'Mon"	David Gleeson, Richard Lara	2:52
2.	"Sister Tease"	Paul Woseen, Lennox	3:21
3.	"Shine On"	Woseen	6:07
