= World Gone Crazy (The Screaming Jets album) =

Studio album by the Screaming Jets
- Released: August 1997
- Recorded: 1997
- Genre: Australian pub rock
- Length: 48:56
- Label: rooArt
- Producer: Steve James

The Screaming Jets chronology
The Screaming Jets (1994)	World Gone Crazy (1997)	Hits and Pieces (1999)

Singles from World Gone Crazy
- 1. "Elvis (...I Remember)" Released: June 1997; 2. "Eve of Destruction" Released: October 1997; 3. "October Grey" Released: February 1998

World Gone Crazy is the fourth studio album by the Australian band the Screaming Jets. The album was released in August 1997 and peaked at number 18 on the ARIA Charts and was certified gold in 1999.

== Track listing ==
No.	Title	Writer(s)	Length
1.	"Elvis (...I Remember)"	Grant Walmsley, David Gleeson	3:53
2.	"When I Go"	Gleeson	4:26
3.	"Strength"	Paul Woseen, Walmsley, Gleeson	2:54
4.	"Jurisdiction"	Walmsley	3:30
5.	"Eve of Destruction"	P. F. Sloan	3:38
6.	"Drowning"	Walmsley, Gleeson	4:24
7.	"Dying to See You"	Walmsley, Gleeson, Jimi Hocking	2:15
8.	"Holding On"	Woseen	3:36
9.	"Stay a While"	Walmsley	3:11
10.	"October Grey"	Woseen	3:52
11.	"Black and White"	Walmsley, Gleeson	3:03
12.	"In and Out"	Walmsley	3:12
13.	"Silence Lost"	Woseen	3:20
14.	"World Gone Crazy"	Walmsley, Gleeson	3:45

== Charts and Certifications ==
=== Weekly charts ===
Chart (1997)	Peak position
Australian Albums (ARIA)	18

=== Certifications ===
Region	Certification	Certified units/sales
Australia (ARIA)	Gold	35,000^{^}
^{^} Shipments figures based on certification alone.

== Band members ==
- Dave Gleeson – vocals
- Paul Woseen – bass guitar, backing vocals
- Jimi "The Human" Hocking – guitar
- Craig Rosevear – drums
- Grant Walmsley – guitar, backing vocals
