= Living in England =

EP by the Screaming Jets
- Released: June 1992
- Length: 18:29
- Label: rooArt
- Producer: Steve James

The Screaming Jets chronology
All for One (1991)	Living in England (1992)	Tear of Thought (1992)

Living in England EP is an extended play (EP) by the Australian rock band the Screaming Jets. Their second EP, it peaked at number 19 on the Australian ARIA Singles Chart.

== Track listing ==
CD/Vinyl 450990100-2
No.	Title	Writer(s)	Length
1.	"Tunnel"	Dave Gleeson, Richard Lara	4:38
2.	"Meet Anybody"	Grant Walmsley	3:23
3.	"Living in England"	Walmsley	2:15
4.	"Folsom Prison Blues"	Johnny Cash	3:22
5.	"Ain't No Fun (Waiting Round to Be a Millionaire)"	Angus Young, Malcolm Young, Bon Scott	4:50

== Charts ==
Chart (1991)	Peak position
Australia (ARIA)	19
