= Shine On (The Screaming Jets song) =

- CD single cover

Single by The Screaming Jets

from the album All for One
- Released: August 1991
- Recorded: 1990
- Studio: Paradise Studios, Sydney
- Length: 4:54
- Label: rooArt
- Songwriter(s): Paul Woseen
- Producer(s): Steve James

The Screaming Jets singles chronology
"Stop the World" (1991)	"Shine On" (1991)	"F.R.C." (1991)

"Shine On" is a song by Australian rock band The Screaming Jets. The song was released in August 1991 as the third single from their debut studio album All for One (1991). The song peaked at number 36 on the ARIA Charts.

== Track listings ==
CD Single

1. "Shine On" - 4:54
2. "Needle" (live) - 4:33
3. "Got It" (live) - 3:33
4. "Starting Out" (live) - 3:57
- Live tracks recorded at The Palais, Newcastle, in May 1991.

== Charts ==
Chart (1991)	Peak position
Australia (ARIA)	36

== Release history ==
Region	Date	Format	Label	Catalogue
Australia	August 1991	CD Single; 7" Single	rooArt	868480-2
