= Scam (album) =

Studio album by the Screaming Jets
- Released: October 2000
- Recorded: 1999–2000
- Genre: Rock, pub rock
- Length: 43:52
- Label: Grudge
- Producer: The Screaming Jets

The Screaming Jets chronology
Hits and Pieces (1999)	Scam (2000)	Live Forever (2002)

Singles from Scam
- 1. "Shine Over Me" Released: May 2000; 2. "Higher with You" Released: 2000

Scam is the fifth studio album by the Australian band the Screaming Jets. It was their first record to be released under Grudge Records, after leaving rooArt. The album debuted and peaked at number 36.

== Track listing ==
No.	Title	Writer(s)	Length
1.	"Individuality"	Grant Walmsley	3:59
2.	"Realise"	Walmsley	2:58
3.	"Shine Over Me"	Walmsley	3:50
4.	"Watching the Grass Grow"	Walmsley	2:59
5.	"No Way Out"	Paul Woseen	2:31
6.	"The Protest Song"	Woseen	3:07
7.	"Higher With You"	Dave Gleeson, Walmsley, Ismet Osmanovic	2:49
8.	"Thinking About You"	Gleeson, Walmsley	3:07
9.	"Over Excited"	Walmsley	2:37
10.	"Maggots"	Walmsley	2:27
11.	"Hitting Myself in the Head"	Woseen	3:03
12.	"Close to You"	Woseen	3:11
13.	"I Need Your Love"	Woseen	3:43
14.	"Don't Be Sorry"	Walmsley, Woseen	3:31

== Weekly charts ==
Chart (2000)	Peak position
Australian Albums (ARIA)	36

== Band members ==
- Dave Gleeson – vocals
- Paul Woseen – bass guitar, backing vocals
- Grant Walmsley – guitar, backing vocals
- Ismet Osmanovic – guitar
- Craig Rosevear – drums (tracks 1–5, 8 and 13)
- Col Hatchman – drums
