= Tear of Thought =

Studio album by the Screaming Jets
- Released: October 1992
- Recorded: 1992
- Studio: Gotham Audio
- Genre: Rock; pub rock
- Length: 63:16
- Label: rooArt
- Producer: Steve James

The Screaming Jets chronology
Living in England (1992)	Tear of Thought (1992)	The Screaming Jets (1995)

Alternative cover
- European cover

Singles from Tear of Thought
- 1. "Think" Released: August 1992; 2. "Shivers" Released: January 1993; 3. "Here I Go" Released: July 1993; 4. "Helping Hand" Released: December 1993; 5. "Tunnel" Released: August 1994

Tear of Thought is the second studio album released by the Australian rock band the Screaming Jets. The album was released in October 1992 and peaked at number 3 in June 1994.

== Reviews ==
Jonathan Lewis of AllMusic said, "The Screaming Jets returned in 1992 with their second full-length album. Tear of Thought established them as stars rather than just another pub rock band. Musically, the disc continues in the vein of hard rock established by their debut, although this time the band experiments with some new musical direction, including the jazz-influenced "Helping Hand" and a faithful cover of the Boys Next Door classic, "Shivers." With enough raw power to delight fans and enough experimentation to keep critics happy, Tear of Thought was an enjoyable, but ultimately disposable, example of Australian hard rock music."

== Track listing ==
All songs written by Paul Woseen, except where noted

No.	Title	Writer(s)	Length
1.	"Dream On"		4:56
2.	"Here I Go"		4:39
3.	"Meet Anybody"	Grant Walmsley	3:22
4.	"Alright"	Walmsley	3:09
5.	"Night Child"		3:59
6.	"Helping Hand"		4:50
7.	"Everytime"	Walmsley	4:12
8.	"Living in England"	Walmsley	2:19
9.	"Think"		4:48
10.	"Best of You"		4:10
11.	"Rich Bitch"		2:38
12.	"Tunnel"	Dave Gleeson, Richard Lara	4:38
13.	"Hard Drugs"	Bryce/Walmsley	3:03
14.	"Sick and Tired"		3:35
15.	"Shivers"	Rowland Howard	4:26
16.	"Feeble"	Walmsley	4:19

== Charts and certifications ==
=== Weekly charts ===
Tear of Thought debuted at number 20 in Australia in November 1992 and peaked at number 3 in June 1994.

Chart (1992–94)	Peak position
Australian Albums (ARIA)	3

=== Year-end charts ===
Chart (1994)	Position
Australian Albums Chart	44
Australian Artist Albums Chart	8

=== Certifications ===
Region	Certification	Certified units/sales
Australia (ARIA)	Platinum	70,000^{^}
^{^} Shipments figures based on certification alone.

== Personnel ==
- Dave Gleeson – vocals
- Richard Lara – guitar
- Grant Walmsley – guitar, backing vocals
- Paul Woseen - bass guitar
- Brad Heaney - drums
