= Helping Hand (song) =

1993 single by the Screaming Jets

- CD single cover

Single by the Screaming Jets

from the album Tear of Thought
- B-side: "High Voltage"; "Shine On"
- Released: 1 November 1993
- Length: 4:50
- Label: rooArt
- Songwriter(s): Paul Woseen
- Producer(s): Steve James

The Screaming Jets singles chronology
"Here I Go" (1993)	"Helping Hand" (1993)	"Tunnel" (1994)

"Helping Hand" is a song by Australian rock band the Screaming Jets. The song was released in November 1993 as the fourth single from the second studio album, Tear of Thought (1992). The song peaked at number 25 on the Australian Singles Chart. The song's music video was filmed at Battersea Power Station in London, England. In January 2018, as part of Triple M's "Ozzest 100", the "most Australian" songs of all time, "Helping Hand" was ranked number 56.

== Track listing ==
CD single

1. "Helping Hand" – 4:50
2. "High Voltage" – 7:22
3. "Shine On" – 8:12

== Charts ==
=== Weekly charts ===
Chart (1994)	Peak position
Australia (ARIA)	25

=== Year-end charts ===
Chart (1994)	Position
Australia (ARIA)	82
