= C'Mon (The Screaming Jets song) =

- CD single cover

Single by The Screaming Jets

from the album The Scorching Adventures of the Screaming Jets & All for One
- Released: December 1990
- Recorded: 1990
- Studio: Paradise Studios, Sydney
- Genre: Rock
- Length: 2:48
- Label: rooArt
- Songwriters: Dave Gleeson, Richard Lara
- Producer: Steve James

The Screaming Jets singles chronology
"C'Mon" (1990)	"Better" (1991)

"C'mon" is the debut single from Australian rock band The Screaming Jets. The song was released in December 1990 as the lead single from their debut extended play The Scorching Adventures of the Screaming Jets (1990). It was also included on their debut studio album, All for One (1991).

== Track listing ==
All lyrics are written by Dave Gleeson and Richard Lara. All tracks produced by Steve James Sherlock.

CD Single
No.	Title	Length
1.	"C'mon"	2:48
2.	"Sister Tease"	3:20
3.	"Blue Sashes"	3:28
Total length:		9:36

== Charts ==
Chart performance for "C'Mon"
Chart (1990–1991)	Peak position
Australia (ARIA)	84
