= Tunnel (The Screaming Jets song) =

1994 single by the Screaming Jets

- CD single cover

Single by the Screaming Jets

from the album Living in England and Tear of Thought
- Released: 1 August 1994
- Length: 3:43
- Label: rooArt
- Songwriters: Dave Gleeson, Richard Lara
- Producer: Steve James

The Screaming Jets singles chronology
"Helping Hand" (1993)	"Tunnel" (1994)	"Sad Song" (1995)

"Tunnel" is a song by Australian rock band the Screaming Jets. The song was released in August 1994 as the fifth and final single from their second studio album, Tear of Thought (1992). The song was also included on the extended play Living in England (1992). "Tunnel" peaked at number 39 on the Australian Singles Chart.

== Track listing ==
CD single

1. "Tunnel" (Caveman mix) – 3:52
2. "Helping Hand" (Live and Sweaty mix) – 4:40
3. "Think" (acoustic) – 5:20
4. "Shivers" (Darwin 100 mix) – 4:57
5. "Living in England" (Caveman mix) – 2:16
6. "Tunnel" (album edit) – 3:43

== Charts ==
Chart (1994)	Peak position
Australia (ARIA)	39

== Release history ==
Region	Date	Format(s)	Label	Ref.
Australia	August 1994	CD; cassette	rooArt	
