= Black Market Music (record label) =

Record label based in Melbourne, Australia

Black Market Music (BMM) began in 1991 with the aim of bringing international blues and roots music to the Australian public through an import and retail business. It is based in Melbourne, Australia.
