= Better (The Screaming Jets song) =

1991 single by the Screaming Jets

- CD single cover

Single by the Screaming Jets

from the album All for One
- B-side: "Rocket Man"
- Released: 25 February 1991
- Studio: Paradise (Sydney, Australia)
- Length: 4:40
- Label: rooArt
- Songwriter(s): Grant Walmsley
- Producer(s): Steve James

The Screaming Jets singles chronology
"C'Mon" (1990)	"Better" (1991)	"Stop the World" (1991)

"Better" is a song by Australian rock band the Screaming Jets. The song was released on 25 February 1991 as the lead single from their debut studio album, All for One (1991). The song peaked at number four on the Australian Singles Chart and was certified gold by the Australian Recording Industry Association (ARIA). A music video was also released, showing the band members singing and playing their instruments in the Outback. In January 2018, as part of Triple M's "Ozzest 100", the 'most Australian' songs of all time, "Better" was ranked number 15, and ranked 100 on the Triple J Hottest 100 of Australian Songs.

== Track listing ==
CD single

1. "Better" – 4:40
2. "Rocket Man" – 3:22

== Charts ==
=== Weekly charts ===
Chart (1991)	Peak position
Australia (ARIA)	4

=== Year-end charts ===
Chart (1991)	Position
Australia (ARIA)	20

== Certifications ==
Region	Certification	Certified units/sales
Australia (ARIA)	Gold	35,000^{^}
^{^} Shipments figures based on certification alone.

== Release history ==
Region	Date	Format(s)	Label	Ref.
Australia	25 February 1991	7-inch vinyl; CD; cassette	rooArt	
