= The Screaming Jets =

Australian hard rock band

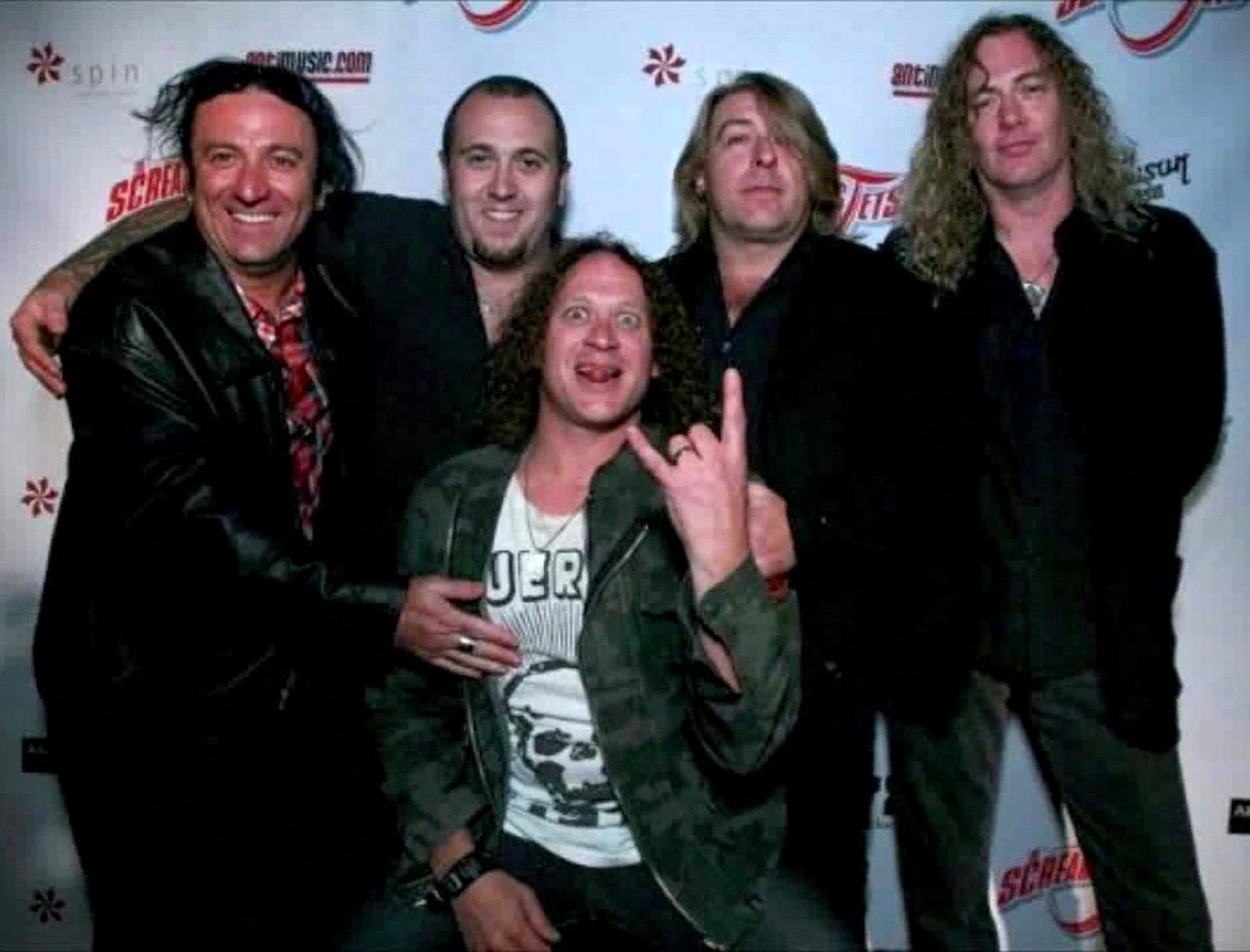
- In 2009, left to right: Ismet "Izzy" Osmanovic, Mickl Sayers, Dave Gleeson, Paul Woseen, Scott Kingman

Background information
- Also known as: The Love Bomb
- Origin: Newcastle, New South Wales, Australia
- Genres: Hard rock, pub rock
- Years active: 1989–present
- Labels: rooArt, Phonogram, Warner Bros., Grudge, Universal, Independent, StockXChange, Atlantic
- Members: Dave Gleeson; Jimi Hocking; Scott Kingman; Cam McGlinchey; Paul Elliot
- Past members: Grant Walmsley; Brad Heaney; Kenny Jewell; Richard Lara; Craig Rosevear; Dave Forbes; Ismet Osmanovic; Steve Hicks; Col Hatchman; Mickl Sayers; Craig Whitelock; Paul Woseen; Mark McLeod
- Website: 'thescreamingjets.com.au'

The Screaming Jets are an Australian hard rock band formed in Newcastle, New South Wales, from the band Aspect formed in high school by Grant, Dave, Frank Manitta and Wiltshire in 1984 which Paul Woseen was also a later member of. In 1989 The Screaming Jets were formed by Grant Walmsley, Dave Gleeson, Paul Woseen, Brad Heaney and Richard Lara. The band has three albums that peaked in the top five on the Australian ARIA Charts: All for One (1991), Tear of Thought (1992), The Screaming Jets (1995), and Professional Misconduct (2023). Their 1991 single "Better" reached No. 4 on the related singles chart. Walmsley left in 2006 and formed his own band. In 2013, bassist Paul Woseen released an acoustic solo album, Bombido.

== Biography ==
=== 1981–1990: Early years and The Scorching Adventures of the Screaming Jets ===
Dave Gleeson and Grant Walmsley met at St Francis Xavier's College, Hamilton, in 1981 and first performed together for a school dance at the Newcastle Town Hall. They formed the group Sudden Impact in 1985, which later became Aspect. Paul Woseen joined in 1988. Richard Lara, on guitar, and Brad Heaney joined shortly after. The band was renamed Screaming Jets in 1989. The group's first performance as The Screaming Jets was at The Love Bomb in a Newcastle pub in March 1989; they won the inaugural National Band Competition run by youth radio broadcaster Triple J in November of that year. The group relocated to Sydney in early 1990 and supported The Angels on a national tour. In May 1990, they signed with an independent label, rooArt. Their debut extended play (EP), The Scorching Adventures of the Screaming Jets, was issued in December 1990.

Through late 1990, The Screaming Jets became infamous for a series of raucous, sometimes violent, live shows. During shows to launch the debut EP, fights often broke out as the band's faithful Newcastle fans mixed with the new Sydney fans. A show at The Kardomah Cafe in Sydney's red-light district saw a string of casualties being ferried to the street outside with injuries including broken noses, a broken leg and numerous victims of heat exhaustion.

=== 1991–1994: All for One, Living in England and Tear of Thought ===
In February 1991, The Screaming Jets released "Better", which peaked at number 4 on the ARIA Charts. In April, their debut studio album All for One was released. The album debuted at number 3 and peaked at number 2 on the ARIA Charts. The album showed influences from Van Halen, AC/DC and The Angels. It reached the Top 50 on the ARIA End of Year Albums Chart for 1991. "Stop the World" and "Shine On" both reached the top 40. The controversial track "F. R. C." ("Fat Rich Cunts") was a crowd favourite and released internationally. Gleeson would dedicate the song to Michael Gudinski or Russ Hinze at concerts. At times, "F. R. C." was performed by guest vocalists from Mortal Sin, The Choirboys or The Angels.

Following the album's release, the group relocated to the United Kingdom, where they based themselves for over two years. Their second EP, Living in England, was issued in June 1992 and included cover versions of Johnny Cash's "Folsom Prison Blues" and AC/DC's "Ain't No Fun (Waiting Round to Be a Millionaire)". The EP peaked in the top 20 in July.

In October 1992, The Screaming Jets released their second studio album, Tear of Thought, which debuted at number 20 and peaked at number 3 in 1994. A cover version of Boys Next Door's song "Shivers" was released in January 1993 and peaked into the Top 20. The group supported Ugly Kid Joe on their European tour in 1993, when Heaney was fired mid-tour. He was temporarily replaced by ex-Judas Priest drummer Dave Holland. Heaney was permanently replaced in the line-up by former BB Steal drummer Craig Rosevear in July 1993. In January 1994, after a US tour backing Def Leppard, Lara was replaced by Melbourne guitarist Jimi "The Human" Hocking (ex-Spectre 7). Both "Helping Hand" and "Tunnel" were Top 40 singles from Tear of Thought.

The band had limited success outside Australia but attracted large audiences at live performances during the 1990s. They received airplay on both commercial and indie-music-focused radio stations.

=== 1995–1999: The Screaming Jets, World Gone Crazy and Hits and Pieces ===
In August 1995, The Screaming Jets released their third studio album, The Screaming Jets, which peaked at No. 5. It was co-produced by the band with Robbie Adams (U2). It was the first CD launched via live Webcast. The single "Friend of Mine", was released in October and reached the top 50. The group continued to tour and started recording their fourth album, World Gone Crazy which was released in August 1997 and peaked into the top 20. The album was produced by Steve James and rooArt had passed their contract to BMG. Hocking had left by June and was replaced on guitar by Ismet "Izzy" Osmanovic (ex-Judge Mercy). BMG released a compilation album, Hits and Pieces in November 1999. One new track, "I Need Your Love" was issued as a single and the limited edition included an eight-track bonus disc. In November 1999, the group participated in the extensive Last Great Rock’n’Roll Show of the Century Australian tour. the group started recording their next studio album, Scam, with former Skyhooks producer Ross Wilson. By early 2000 Rosevear left to be replaced by on drums by Col Hatchman.

=== 2000–2003: Scam, Live Forever and hiatus ===
In early 2000 Rosevear was replaced by on drums by Col Hatchman and the group recorded their next fifth studio album, Scam, with former Skyhooks producer Ross Wilson. Scam was released in October 2000 on Grudge Records through Universal Music. They were selected to tour with Kiss and Alice Cooper in 2001. In June the band performed their last concert in Newcastle before an extended break. The live album of the show was released in December 2002 as Live Forever.

On 29 August 2000, The Screaming Jets were thrown off the inaugural Brisbane to Newcastle flight for the now defunct Impulse Airlines. The new Boeing 717-200 jet had taxied to the runway for the early morning flight when it was forced to return to the terminal after band members broke into a rendition of Puff The Magic Dragon. "We thought of everything to get the press and this is it," unrepentant lead vocalist Dave Gleeson said after the band was escorted from the plane by Australian Protective Services staff.

=== 2004–2015: Heart of the Matter, Rock On and Do Ya and infrequent touring ===
In 2004 the group recommenced recording and touring. The group signed with Universal Music Australia and released Heart of the Matter in August 2004. In November 2004, Hatchman left the group, his last performance was recorded for the live Rock On album released in 2005 by Liberation Records. Hatchman was replaced by Mickl "The Slayer" Sayers, formerly of Sydney band Tripguage. In October 2006, four Screaming Jets songs were listed in the Triple M Essential 2006 Countdown: "Helping Hand" (voted 447 out of 2006), "Eve of Destruction" (voted 683 out of 2006), "Shivers" (voted 1588 out of 2006) and "My Badger Drinks" (voted 1596 out of 2006).

Early in 2007, founding member and guitarist Walmsley left the band and was replaced by Scotty Kingman, who engineered the band's next album. According to Gleeson, Walmsley left because his external commitments interfered with the band's schedules. Walmsley went on to form the indie roots band Agents of Peace. In October 2008, The Screaming Jets released their sixth studio album, Do Ya through StockXchange Music. In October 2009, Osmanovich left and Hocking returned to the line-up.

Live shows from The Screaming Jets were infrequent through 2010 and 2011, and the band played only one show in 2012, at the car festival Summernats. But the band returned for a short 'Best Of' tour in late 2013. In May, 2013, bassist and key songwriter Paul Woseen released his debut solo album "Bombido".

=== 2016–2022: Chrome, Gotcha Covered and 30th anniversary edition of All for One ===
In May 2016, the band released their seventh studio album, "Chrome", followed by a national tour with fellow Australian band Massive in support. The album met with critical and commercial success. In March 2017, it was announced The Screaming Jets will perform a national headline tour with Baby Animals in June and July 2017.

In July 2018, The Screaming Jets released Gotcha Covered their eighth studio album, a collection of 15 iconic Australian songs spanning from the mid 1960s to the 1990s.

In 2019, the band released a greatest hits album and national tour to celebrate 30 years as a band.

In August 2021, the band released a re-recorded All for One, celebrating its 30th anniversary. A national tour accompanied the album's release beginning in July 2022 and concluding in October 2022.

=== 2023–present: Professional Misconduct and Paul Woseen's death ===
In July 2023, the band released "Nothing to Lose", the lead single from their tenth studio album, Professional Misconduct.

Bassist and co-founder Paul Woseen died on 15 September 2023, at the age of 56. Professional Misconduct was released on 6 October 2023.

== Band members ==
=== Current line-up ===
- Dave Gleeson – lead vocals (1989–present)
- Jimi "The Human" Hocking – guitar, backing vocals (1993–1997, 2009–present)
- Cam McGlinchey – drums (2019–present)
- Paul Elliott – bass guitar (2024–present; touring 2023–2024)
- Pete Robinson – guitar (2026–present)

=== Previous members ===
- Grant Walmsley – guitar, backing vocals (1989–2006)
- Paul Woseen – bass guitar, backing vocals (1989–2023; died 2023)
- Brad Heaney – drums (1989–1993)
- Richard Lara – guitar (1989–1993)
- Craig Rosevear – drums (1993–2000)
- Ismet "Izzy" Osmanovic – guitar, backing vocals (1997–2009)
- Col Hatchman – drums (2000–2004)
- Mickl "The Slayer" Sayers – drums (2005–2017)
- Kenny Jewell – guitar (2007–2009), bass guitar, backing vocals (2006; touring substitute for Paul Woeseen)
- Mark McLeod – drums (2017–2019)
- Dario Bortolin – bass guitar (2023; touring)
- Scott Kingman – guitar (2007–2026; touring 2006–2007)

== Discography ==
- All for One (1991)
- Tear of Thought (1992)
- The Screaming Jets (1995)
- World Gone Crazy (1997)
- Scam (2000)
- Do Ya (2008)
- Chrome (2016)
- Gotcha Covered (2018)
- All for One (30 Year Anniversary Edition) (2021)
- Professional Misconduct (2023)

== Awards and nominations ==
=== ARIA Music Awards ===
The ARIA Music Awards is an annual awards ceremony that recognises excellence, innovation, and achievement across all genres of Australian music. They commenced in 1987.

Year	Nominee / work	Award	Result	Ref.
1991	"C'mon"	Best New Talent	Nominated	
1992	"Better"	Highest Selling Single	Nominated	
1994	"Shivers"	Highest Selling Single	Nominated	
1998	World Gone Crazy	Best Rock Album	Nominated	
