= RooArt =

Australian record label

rooArt
- Parent company: BMG (bought in 1996)
- Founded: 1988
- Founder: Chris Murphy, Sebastian Chase, Justin Van Stom
- Status: Closed
- Distributors: PolyGram (1988–1991); Warner Music Australia (1991–1995); Shock Records (1995–1996)
- Genre: Rock/Various
- Country of origin: Australia

rooArt was an Australian independent record label, founded in 1988 by INXS's then-manager, Chris Murphy, label owner Sebastian Chase and Murphy's former employee, Justin Van Stom. The label's roster included several well-known Australian bands and artists such as Crow, Ratcat, Screaming Jets, You Am I, Wendy Matthews, The Hummingbirds, The Trilobites and Amanda Brown with Lindy Morrison in Cleopatra Wong. Other bands which made early or first releases on the rooArt label included Hipslingers, The Last Metro, The Lab, The Fauves, Bellicose and Custard. rooArt released a series of three compilation albums of new or then-unsigned acts, called Youngblood. A number of acts released on the compilations went on to record their own albums, including Tall Tales and True, The Trilobites and Martha’s Vineyard.

Sydney band Crash Politics were the first band signed to rooArt, which released their debut album Mothers' Intention. The label's second signing was The Hummingbirds, who had released four singles on their previous label Phantom Records, with their debut LP loveBUZZ being one of the first hit albums for rooArt.

The label had a sub-branch called Ra Records, whose focus was on alternative rock; You Am I, Augie March, The Mark Of Cain, The Mandelbrot Set (band) and Buffalo Tom were signed to this. It also had a section called rooArt Jazz, which released an album by Free Spirits in 1990.

rooArt releases were distributed by PolyGram until 1991, then by Warner Music Australia, until 1995 when the label switched to the independent Shock Records label to manage its marketing and distribution. In October 1996, on the eve of You Am I's triumph at the ARIA Awards, it was announced that BMG Australia had purchased rooArt for A$5 million.

Subsequently, other releases were released by BMG on the Ra imprint, including several from Augie March.

== Artists ==
- The Screaming Jets
- Wendy Matthews
- You Am I
- The Hummingbirds
- Ratcat
- Absent Friends
- Weddings Parties Anything
- James Reyne
- Custard
- Martha’s Vineyard
- The Trilobites
- Amanda Brown

== See also ==
- List of record labels
