= The Best of Skyhooks =

Compilation album by Skyhooks
- Released: December 1979
- Recorded: 1974–1978
- Studio: TCS, Melbourne; Armstrong's, Melbourne; Trafalgar, Sydney; The Record Plant, Sausalito, California
- Genre: Pop rock; glam rock
- Length: 58:39
- Label: Mushroom/Festival
- Producer: Ross Wilson; Eddie Leonetti

Skyhooks chronology
Live! Be in It (1978)	The Best of Skyhooks (1979)	Hot for the Orient (1980)

Professional ratings
Review scores
Source	Rating
AllMusic	4.5/5 stars

The Best of Skyhooks is the second compilation album released in December 1979 by Australian band Skyhooks, following The Skyhooks Tapes in 1977. The album was released after lead singer Graeme Strachan left in late 1978. The album peaked at number 9 in Australia.

== Background ==
Australian pop rock group Skyhooks had formed in March 1973. By 1978 they had issued four studio albums, Living in the 70's (October 1974), Ego Is Not a Dirty Word (July 1975), Straight in a Gay Gay World (August 1976) and Guilty Until Proven Insane (March 1978), from which the tracks for their second compilation album, The Best of Skyhooks (December 1979) were gathered. For the first three studio albums the line-up was Greg Macainsh on bass guitar, Graeme "Shirley" Strachan on lead vocals, Bob "Bongo Starr" Starkie on guitar, Imants "Freddie" Strauks on drums and Red Symons on guitar. They had all been produced by Ross Wilson. After Straight in a Gay Gay World Symons was replaced on guitar by Bob Spencer and following Guilty Until Proven Insane Strachan left. For the latter album they had worked with Eddie Leonetti in the studio. The Best of Skyhooks peaked at No. 9 on the Australian Kent Music Report albums chart.

== Track listing ==
All tracks are written by Greg Macainsh, unless otherwise noted.

Side A
No.	Title	Length
1.	"Livin' in the 70's"	3:44
2.	"You Just Like Me 'Cos I'm Good in Bed"	3:44
3.	"Balwyn Calling"	3:14
4.	"Horror Movie"	3:17
5.	"Smut" (Red Symons)	5:21
6.	"All My Friends Are Getting Married"	4:50
7.	"Ego Is Not a Dirty Word"	3:00
8.	"Let It Rock" (Chuck Berry)	2:48

Side B
No.	Title	Length
1.	"Million Dollar Riff"	3:51
2.	"This Is My City"	3:37
3.	"Bbbbbbbbbbbbboogie" (Fred Strauks)	3:00
4.	"Crazy Heart"	5:00
5.	"Blue Jeans"	2:30
6.	"Party to End All Parties"	3:14
7.	"Over the Border"	3:08
8.	"Women in Uniform"	4:21
Total length:		58:39

== Charts ==
Chart performance for The Best of Skyhooks
Chart (1979–1980)	Peak position
Australian Kent Music Report Albums Chart	9
