= The Lost Album (Skyhooks album) =

The Collection / The Lost Album

Studio album by Skyhooks
- Released: June 1999
- Recorded: 1990–1994
- Genres: Pop, rock
- Length: 116:39
- Label: Mushroom Records
- Producers: Ross Fraser & Mark Moffatt

Skyhooks chronology
| Singles and B sides (1994) | The Collection / The Lost Album (1999) | Don't You Believe What You've Seen or You've Heard (2015) |

The Lost Album/The Collection is a double-disc album by Australian glam rock band Skyhooks, released in 1999.

The Lost Album was the result of 1990–1994 recording sessions. It was recorded by the "classic" lineup responsible for the group's first three albums. Only three tracks on the album had previously been released; "Jukebox in Siberia", a hit single in 1990, "Tall Timber" (a less successful release from 1990) and "Happy Hippy Hut" (1994). The first of these two had been included in The Latest and Greatest compilation from 1990.

Skyhooks recorded the Lost Album songs with the intention of releasing its first studio album in 14 years, but the group chose not to go ahead with this plan. Instead Skyhooks issued the album much later, as what was essentially a bonus disc to The Collection, which featured tracks from their five 1970s albums.

Despite being released in 1999, its ARIA Chart peak came in 2001 at number 36 following the death of band member Graeme Strachan.

== Critical reception ==
Eduardo Rivadavia from AllMusic gave the set 4 out of 5, saying; "Skyhooks were once one of [Australia]'s most successful, influential, and controversial bands -- a true antipodean phenomenon for much of the 1970s!" He added that, similar to the hits, the 11 new tracks on disc two featured Macainsh's cleverly amusing lyrics.

== Track listing ==
All tracks by Greg Macainsh, except where noted.

=== The Collection ===
1. "Living in the 70's"
2. "You Just Like Me 'Cos I'm Good in Bed"
3. "Balwyn Calling"
4. "Horror Movie"
5. "Smut" (Red Symons)
6. "Carlton"
7. "Toorak Cowboy"
8. "All My Friends Are Getting Married"
9. "Ego Is Not a Dirty Word"
10. "Million Dollar Riff"
11. "This Is My City"
12. "Mercedes Ladies"
13. "Forging Ahead" (Red Symons)
14. "Let It Rock" (Chuck Berry)
15. "Crazy Heart"
16. "Blue Jeans"
17. "Party to End All Parties"
18. "BBB BBB Boogie" (Fred Strauks)
19. "Women in Uniform"

=== The Lost Album ===
1. "Jukebox in Siberia" – 3:52
2. "Tall Timber" – 5:14
3. "Tigersnake Kiss" – 3:30
4. "Kooyong Dollar" – 3:58
5. "Kickback" – 3:24
6. "Happy Hippy Hut" – 3:46
7. "My Girleen" – 2:57 (Bob Starkie, I. Bland)
8. "Black & White Bar" – 4:40
9. "1976 Guitar" – 3:58
10. "Westgate Light" – 4:00
11. "Powdertown" – 5:32

== Charts ==
| Chart (2001) | Peak position |
|---|---|
| Australian Albums (ARIA) | 36 |

== Personnel ==
- Graeme "Shirley" Strachan – lead Vocals
- Red Symons – guitar, backing vocals, lead vocals on "Smut" and "Forging Ahead"
- Bob "Bongo" Starkie – guitar, backing vocals, lead vocals on "My Girleen"
- Imants Alfred Strauks – drums, percussion, backing vocals
- Greg Macainsh – bass guitar, backing vocals
- Bob Spencer – guitar, backing vocals

== Notes ==
- Disc 1 is a "best of" collection of the years 1974–1978.
- Disc 2 includes recordings made in 1990 (2.1–2.2) and 1994 (2.3–2.11). Tracks 2.3–2.5 and 2.7–2.11 were previously unreleased.
