= Hits'n'Riffs =

Compilation album by Skyhooks
- Released: 13 November 2015
- Recorded: 1974–1990
- Studio: TCS Studios, Record Plant, Sausalito, Ormond Hall, Trafalgar Studios, AAV, Metropolis Audio, Sing Sing Studios
- Genre: Pop rock; glam rock
- Label: Festival Records; Warner Music Australia
- Producer: Eddie Leonetti; Greg Macainsh; John French; Mark Moffatt; Ross Fraser; Ross Wilson

Skyhooks chronology
| Don't You Believe What You've Seen or You've Heard (2015) | Hits'n'Riffs (2015) |

Hits'n'Riffs is a compilation album released in November 2015 by Australian band Skyhooks. It followed two weeks after the release of the band's 3CD box set, Don't You Believe What You've Seen or You've Heard

The band made a surprise reformation in early October for RocKwiz's Salute to the ARIA Hall of Fame live show. The album was then announced on 6 November 2015 and includes hit singles, classic album tracks, fan favourites and includes the rare "1976 Guitar" all digitally remastered for the first time.

The album features cover artwork from 1970s album cover and poster artist Ian McCausland, and the booklet includes several previously unseen images.

== Track listing ==
1. "Living in the 70's" – 3:45
2. "Balwyn Calling" – 3:34
3. "Horror Movie" – 3:50
4. "You Just Like Me 'Cos I'm Good in Bed" – 3:46
5. "Ego Is Not a Dirty Word" – 2:56
6. "Saturday Night" – 2:50
7. "All My Friends Are Getting Married" – 4:49
8. "Every Chase a Steeple" – 3:42
9. "Blue Jeans" – 2:31
10. "Let It Rock" – 2:50
11. "Million Dollar Riff" – 3:50
12. "This Is My City" – 3:41
13. "Somewhere in Sydney" – 3:47
14. "Party to End All Parties" – 3:16
15. "Why Dontcha All Get Fucked" – 4:03
16. "Women in Uniform" – 4:24
17. "Jukebox in Siberia" – 3:52
18. "1976 Guitar" – 3:57
- All tracks written by Greg Macainsh, except track 7, Red Symons and track 10 Chuck Berry.

== Charts ==
Hits'n'Riffs made its ARIA Chart debut at number 71 following the airing of the Network Seven miniseries Molly in February 2016. The show was the number 1 watched show of the night, with more than 1.8 million viewers. The following week, the album rose to number 32. Skyhooks' music featured prominently in the series.

=== Weekly charts ===
| Chart (2016) | Peak position |
|---|---|
| Australian Albums (ARIA) | 32 |

== Personnel ==
- Greg Macainsh – bass
- Imants "Fred" Strauks – drums
- Doug Brady – engineering (track 17)
- Ern Rose – engineering (track 10)
- Greg Henderson – engineering (track 18)
- John French – engineering (tracks 1–9, 11–14)
- Lee De Carlo – engineering (tracks 15 and 16)
- Peter Walker – engineering (tracks 15 and 16)
- Bob Spencer – guitar (tracks 14–16)
- Bob "Bongo" Starkie – guitar (tracks 1–13, 17 and 18)
- Red Symons – guitar (tracks 1–13, 17 and 18)
- Ern Rose – mixing (track 10)
- Graeme "Shirley" Strachan – vocals

== Release history ==
| Region | Date | Format | Edition(s) | Label | Catalogue |
|---|---|---|---|---|---|
| Australia | 13 November 2015 | CD; digital download | Standard | Festival Records, Warner Music Australia | FEST601043 |
