= The Latest and Greatest =

Compilation album by Skyhooks
- Released: November 1990
- Recorded: 1974–1978, 1990
- Genre: Pop rock; glam rock
- Label: Mushroom

Skyhooks chronology
Live in the 80's (1983)	The Latest and Greatest (1990)	Singles and B sides (1994)

Singles from The Latest and Greatest
- 1. "Jukebox in Siberia" Released: October 1990; 2. "Tall Timber" Released: November 1990

The Latest and Greatest is a greatest hits compilation album by Australian rock band Skyhooks. It was released by Mushroom Records in November 1990 in Australia and peaked at number 4 on the chart and was certified platinum.

== Background ==
Skyhooks formed in inner Melbourne in 1974 and sold well across Australia with their first two albums, Living in the 70's and Ego Is Not a Dirty Word, both peaking at number 1 in 1975. It was novel to hear Australian songs about buying dope in the inner city, sex in the suburbs, the local gay scene and songs with place-specific themes such as 'Toorak Cowboy' and 'Balwyn Calling'. The group's popularity has been particularly attributed to their socially-aware lyrics and timely style.

The band had been on hiatus since 1984, but in 1988 Greg Macainsh began working on new material. This led to two new songs: "Jukebox in Siberia" and "Tall Timber". "Jukebox in Siberia" was released as a single in October 1990 and peaked at number 1 on the ARIA singles chart and opened the band to a whole new audience. As a result, their record label decided to release a new "best of" album in the November, titled The Latest and Greatest.

== Track listing ==
TVD93339
No.	Title	Writer(s)	Length
1.	"Jukebox in Siberia"	Greg Macainsh	3:51
2.	"Living in the 70s"	Macainsh	3:41
3.	"You Just Like Me 'Cos I'm Good in Bed"	Macainsh	3:42
4.	"Balwyn Calling"	Macainsh	3:40
5.	"Horror Movie"	Macainsh	3:45
6.	"Smut"	Red Symons	5:14
7.	"All My Friends Are Getting Married"	Macainsh	4:48
8.	"Ego Is Not a Dirty Word"	Macainsh	2:59
9.	"Million Dollar Riff"	Macainsh	3:48
10.	"This Is My City"	Macainsh	3:39
11.	"BBBBBBBoogie"	Freddie Strauks	3:01
12.	"Crazy Heart"	Macainsh	4:55
13.	"Blue Jeans"	Macainsh	2:28
14.	"Party to End All Parties"	Macainsh	3:13
15.	"Women in Uniform"	Macainsh	4:20
16.	"Tall Timber"	Macainsh	5:13

== Chart positions ==
=== Weekly charts ===
Chart (1990)	Position
Australian Albums (ARIA)	4

=== Year-end charts ===
Chart (1990)	Position
Australian Albums (ARIA)	27

== Certifications ==
Region	Certification	Certified units/sales
Australia (ARIA)	Platinum	70,000^{^}
^{^} Shipments figures based on certification alone.

== Notes ==
- Tracks 2, 3, 4, 5, 6 recorded at TCS Studios, Melbourne, July 1974
- Tracks 7, 8 recorded at TCS Studios, Melbourne, May 1975
- Track 9 recorded at TCS Studios, Melbourne, October 1975
- Tracks 10, 12, 13 recorded at The Record Plant, Sausalito, California May 1976
- Track 14 recorded at TCS Studios, Melbourne, February 1977
- Tracks 11, 15 recorded at Trafalgar Studios, Sydney, October 1977
- Tracks 1, 16 recorded at Metropolis Audio, Melbourne, August 1990
