= Live in the 80's =

Live in the 80’s

Live album by Skyhooks
- Released: November 1983
- Recorded: 29–30 April 1983
- Venues: Festival Hall, Melbourne
- Genres: Pop rock, glam rock
- Label: Mushroom
- Producer: Greg Macainsh

Skyhooks chronology
Hot for the Orient (1980)	Live in the 80’s (1983)	The Latest and Greatest (1990)

Live in the 80's is a live album by Australian rock band Skyhooks. It was released by Mushroom Records in November 1983 in Australia and was certified gold.

The album cover is a 'live' reenactment of their Living in the 70's album cover.

== Background ==
Skyhooks had announced their split in 1980, following the release of Hot for the Orient. In late 1982, Mushroom Records had released a megamix of their hits, titled "Hooked on Hooks", which peaked at number 21 in Australia. A boxed set of albums was produced in early 1983 and an unsuccessful attempt was made to persuade the group to reconvene for the major music festival Narara. Soon afterwards, responding to a strong nationwide demand, a tour was announced featuring the group line-up as it appeared on its first two albums. The Melbourne shows on 29 and 30 April 1983 were recorded and released. Seven of the eleven tracks included originally appeared on the group's ten-track debut album; the remaining four songs were hit singles from the group's subsequent history. Hot for the Orient, which did not feature either Strachan or Symons, was not represented.

== Track listing ==
Side A
No.	Title	Writer(s)	Length
1.	"Horror Movie"	Greg Macainsh	3:48
2.	"Ego (Is Not a Dirty Word)"	Macainsh	3:13
3.	"Revolution"	Macainsh	4:35
4.	"Smut"	Red Symons	4:51
5.	"You Just Like Me 'Cos I'm Good in Bed"	Macainsh	3:59
6.	"Million Dollar Riff"	Macainsh	3:57

Side B
No.	Title	Writer(s)	Length
1.	"Balwyn Calling"	Macainsh	4:40
2.	"Living in the 70's"	Macainsh	4:40
3.	"Carlton (Lygon Street Limbo)"	Macainsh	5:23
4.	"Women in Uniform"	Macainsh	4:20
5.	"All My Friends Are Getting Married"	Macainsh	5:12

== Charts ==
Chart (1983/84)	Peak position
Australian Kent Music Report Albums Chart	19

== Personnel ==
- Alan Mitchell – cover photography
- Karen McGregor – design, art direction
- Doug Brady – engineering assistance
- Bill Canty – keyboards
- Michael Gudinski – management
- Mark Wojt – inner sleeve photography
- Peter Pryor – inner sleeve photography
- Greg Macainsh – bass guitar, production
- Jim Barton – production, engineering
