= Don't You Believe What You've Seen or You've Heard =

Box set by Skyhooks
- Released: 30 October 2015
- Recorded: 1974–1975
- Label: Festival Records / Warner Music Group

Skyhooks chronology
The Lost Album (1999)	Don't You Believe What You've Seen or You've Heard (2015)	Hits'n'Riffs (2015)

Don't You Believe What You've Seen or You've Heard is three-disc box set by Australian glam rock band Skyhooks, subtitled '40 Years of 'Hooks Hysteria!'. The box set includes Skyhooks' first two albums Living in the 70's and Ego Is Not a Dirty Word which both peaked at number 1 in Australia in 1975. The set includes bonus original B-sides and unreleased demos. The third disc is called Skyhooks in Concert: 1974–75. it features 14 previously unreleased live tracks from 1974 and 1975. The album was packaged with a deluxe 8-panel digipak and a 36-page booklet with numerous never-before-seen images and a new essay from former Rock Australia Magazine editor and Skyhooks confidant Anthony O'Grady.

== Reviews ==
Patrick Emery of Beat magazine gave the album 4 out of 5 saying; "For a couple of years, there was nothing bigger in Australia than Skyhooks. To hear this compilation is to realise just why that was", adding, "The classics come thick and fast [...] But to get a sense of just how culturally significant Skyhooks were in the mid '70s, it's best to skip to the live tracks. The opening strains of 'Horror Movie' live at Festival Hall in July 1975 are accompanied by a wave of teenage hysteria; by the end of 'Love on the Radio' it's verging on madness."

== Track listing ==
All songs written by Greg Macainsh except where noted

CD1 – Living in the 70's

1. "Living in the 70s"
2. "Whatever Happened to the Revolution"
3. "Balwyn Calling"
4. "Horror Movie"
5. "You Just Like Me 'Cos I'm Good in Bed"
6. "Carlton (Lygon Street Limbo)"
7. "Toorak Cowboy"
8. "Smut" (Red Symons)
9. "Hey What's the Matter"
10. "Motorcycle Bitch"
11. "Broken Gin Bottle" bonus track (B side of original "Living in the 70's" single)
12. "Don’t Suck it" bonus track (Demo)
13. "Hey Whats The Matter" bonus track (Demo)
14. "Horror Movie" bonus track (Demo)
15. "Carlton (Lygon Street Limbo)" bonus track (Demo)

CD2 – Ego Is Not a Dirty Word

1. "Ego is Not a Dirty Word"
2. "Love on the Radio" (Macainsh, Steve Hill)
3. "Saturday Night"
4. "Love’s Not Good Enough"
5. "The Other Side"
6. "Smartarse Songwriters"
7. "Mercedes Ladies"
8. "All My Friends Are Getting Married"
9. "Every Chase a Steeple" (Symons)
10. "Private Eye"
11. "Sweet Sister" bonus track (Demo)
12. "The Other Side" bonus track (Demo)
13. "Saturday Night" bonus track (Demo)
14. "Love on the Radio" bonus track (Demo) (Macainsh, Hill)
15. "Smartarse Songwriters" bonus track (Demo)

CD3 – Skyhooks in Concert: 1974–75

1. "Hey What's the Matter"
2. "Living in the 70's"
3. "Whatever Happened to the Revolution"
4. "Balwyn Calling"
5. "Toorak Cowboy"
6. "Smut" (Symons)
7. "All My Friends are Getting Married"
8. "Ego is Not a Dirty Word"
9. "Carlton (Lygon Street Limbo)"
10. "Private Eye"
11. "You Just Like Me 'Cos I’m Good in Bed"
12. "Smartarse Songwriters"
13. "Horror Movie"
14. "Love on the Radio" (Macainsh, Hill)
- Tracks 1–3 Sydney Opera House, Sydney - September 15, 1974
- Tracks 4–9 Sydney State Theatre, Sydney - April 12, 1975
- Track 10 Her Majesty's Theatre, Adelaide - July 9, 1975
- Tracks 11–12 Ormond Hall, Melbourne - December 31, 1975
- Tracks 13–14 Festival Hall, Melbourne - July 3, 1975

== Charts ==
=== Weekly charts ===
Chart (2015)	Peak position
Australian Albums (ARIA)	40

== Release history ==
Region	Date	Format	Edition(s)	Label	Catalogue
Australia	30 October 2015	CD; digital download	Standard	Festival Records, Warner Music Australia	FEST601042
