= The Skyhooks Tapes =

Compilation album by Skyhooks
- Released: September 1977
- Recorded: 1974–1977
- Studio: TCS Studios, Reefer Cabaret and Armstrong's Studios Melbourne; The Record Plant, Sausalito, California
- Genre: Pop rock; glam rock
- Label: Mushroom
- Producer: Ross Wilson, Duke Wilson, Greg Macainsh

Skyhooks chronology
Straight in a Gay Gay World (1976)	The Skyhooks Tapes (1977)	Guilty Until Proven Insane (1978)

Singles from The Skyhooks Tapes
- 1. "Party to End All Parties" Released: April 1977

The Skyhooks Tapes is the first compilation album by Australian band Skyhooks, released in September 1977. The album features all the band's A- and B-side singles and peaked within the top 50 in Australia.

== Background ==
In February 1977, Red Symons left the band and was replaced on guitar by Bob Spencer. The band continued to tour nationally, promoting their three studio albums.

== Track listing ==
Side A
No.	Title	Writer(s)	Length
1.	"All My Friends Are Getting Married"	Greg Macainsh
2.	"Party to End All Parties"	Macainsh
3.	"Crazy Heart"	Macainsh
4.	"Ego Is Not a Dirty Word"	Macainsh
5.	"Hot Rod James"	Macainsh
6.	"Million Dollar Riff"	Macainsh
7.	"You're a Broken Gin Bottle Baby"	Macainsh

Side B
No.	Title	Writer(s)	Length
1.	"Let It Rock" (live)	Chuck Berry
2.	"Revolution" (US version)	Macainsh
3.	"Blue Jeans"	Macainsh
4.	"Living in the 70s"	Macainsh
5.	"You Just Like Me 'Cos I'm Good in Bed"	Macainsh
6.	"Forging Ahead"	Red Symons
7.	"Horror Movie"	Macainsh

== Charts ==
Chart (1977)	Peak position
Australian Kent Music Report Albums Chart	49
