= Hooked on Hooks =

- 12" single cover art

Single by Skyhooks
- B-side: "Smut"
- Released: December 1982
- Genre: Glam rock
- Length: 4:53
- Label: Mushroom
- Songwriter: Greg Macainsh

Skyhooks singles chronology
"Keep the Junk in America" (1980)	"Hooked on Hooks" (1982)	"Jukebox in Siberia" (1990)

"Hooked on Hooks" is a 1982 medley produced from earlier recordings by the Australian band Skyhooks. It is a megamix of seven of their greatest hits. It peaked at number 21 in Australia. It is made up of the songs: "Horror Movie", "Ego (Is Not a Dirty Word)", "This Is My City", "Living in the 70's", "You Just Like Me 'Cos I'm Good in Bed", "Women in Uniform", and "Million Dollar Riff". It was released on 12", 7" and cassingle formats.

== Background ==
In 1980, Skyhooks had released its fifth and final studio album, Hot for the Orient which became the group's first album to miss the top ten, peaking at number 32. Skyhooks split later that year. The band's songs continued to receive airplay and two years later, their record label Mushroom Records decided to 'test the water' regarding the group's ongoing popularity by releasing a megamix of their songs, titled "Hooked on Hooks". It became a hit which led to additional album compilation releases, and a tour by the 'classic' line-up of the group, the following year.

== Court case ==
In 1983, Jacqueline Brumley brought an action against Mushroom Records because of the unauthorised use of her face on the back cover of the 12" version of the record. Brumley's image was emblazoned with the title of the b-side of the single, "Smut". Her photograph had been taken in 1976 when she was 16 years old and attending a concert at Waverley High School. Brumley claimed in her affidavit that the use of her picture 'caused me extreme embarrassment as the imputation contained by the word "smut" is that I am a person of extremely loose morals and character'. The case was settled out of court. There was no revised edition of the sleeve issued (the 7" version had not featured Brumley's photograph).

== Track listings ==
7" single (K-8820)

- Side A "Hooked on Hooks" - 4:53
- Side B "Smut" - 5:18

12" single (X13100)/ Cassingle

- Side A "Hooked on Hooks" (Extended Version) - 6:20
- Side B1 "Hooked on Hooks" (Instrumental) - 6:12
- Side B2 "Smut" - 5:18

== Credits ==
- Engineer, Producer – John French
- Original Producers – Eddie Leonetti, Ross Wilson
- Producer, Recorded– Trevor Courtney
- Recorded At – T.C.S. Studios

== Charts ==
Chart (1982/83)	Peak position
Australia (Kent Music Report)	21
