= Mushroom: Fifty Years of Making Noise =

2023 Anniversary celebration

Mushroom: Fifty Years of Making Noise is a yearlong event celebrating the fiftieth anniversary of Mushroom Records. The event was launched with an advertisement and release of special merchandise in March 2023, release of several reimagined singles and concluded with a live concert on 26 November 2023 at Rod Laver Arena. The release of the Michael Gudinski documentary Ego: The Michael Gudinski Story in August 2023, coincided with the event.

== 50 Songs for 50 Years ==
50 Songs for 50 Years
- Dates: 26 November 2023
- Locations: Rod Laver Arena, Melbourne, Australia
- Website: Official website

A live concert titled 50 Songs for 50 Years is set for 26 November 2023 and will be broadcast live throughout Australia via Seven Network and 7plus.

The concert was announced in October 2023 with Mushroom Group CEO Matt Gudinski calling the concert an "incredible once-in-a-lifetime night" saying "This will be a true celebration of Australian music and a showcase our thriving local music scene and its history. I know my late father would be very proud of what we are putting together."

=== Performers and set list ===
Below is a list of performers"

- Jimmy Barnes – "No Second Prize", "Working Class Man"
- Vika & Linda – "Livin' in the 70s", "When Will You Fall for Me"
- Missy Higgins – "Wide Open Road", "Scar"
- The Rubens – "Hoops", "Good Mood"
- Christine Anu and Zipporah – "My Island Home"
- Goanna – "Solid Rock"
- Diesel – "Just Like Fire Would"
- Ian Moss – "Tucker's Daughter"
- The Temper Trap – "Under The Milky Way", "Sweet Disposition"
- Frente! – "Ordinary Angels"
- Deborah Conway and Willy Zygier – "It's Only the Beginning"
- Kate Ceberano – "Pash"
- Paul Kelly – "Before Too Long", "Alone with You"
- Yothu Yindi – "Djäpana (Sunset Dreaming)", "Treaty"
- Bliss n Eso – "The Sea Is Rising", "Moments"
- Leonardo's Bride – "Even When I'm Sleeping"
- DMA's – "Silver", "Lay Down"
- Fred Loneragan of Machinations – "No Say in It"
- Dan Sultan – "Took the Children Away", "Old Fitzroy" (with Missy Higgins)
- The Teskey Brothers – "So Caught Up", "Oceans of Emotions"
- Ross Wilson – "Ego Is Not a Dirty Word" (with Red Symons), "Cool World"
- Amy Shark – "Can't Get You Out of My Head"
- Birds of Tokyo – "Lanterns", "Good Lord"
- Logan Priest – "Famous"
- Wilsn – "Heading in the Right Direction"
- merci, mercy – "Riptide"
- Gordi and Lotte Gallagher – "Message to My Girl"
- Hunters & Collectors – "Throw Your Arms Around Me" (with Ed Sheeran), "Do You See What I See?", "Holy Grail"

=== Reception ===
The four-hour event was the most-watched entertainment show of the evening, with 557,000 viewers.

Noah Redfern from The Music said "Celebrating Mushroom's 50th anniversary by travelling through the history and legacy of the label in song and stories, the event was really something to behold."

== Mushroom: Fifty Years of Making Noise (Reimagined) ==
Mushroom: Fifty Years of Making Noise (Reimagined)

Compilation album by Various Artists
- Released: 24 November 2023
- Label: Mushroom Records

Singles from Mushroom: Fifty Years of Making Noise (Reimagined)
- 1. "Under the Milky Way" Released: 24 March 2023; 2. "Wide Open Road" Released: 31 March 2023; 3. "Hoops" Released: 7 April 2023; 4. "Alone with You" Released: 14 April 2023; 5. "Covered in Chrome" Released: 29 May 2023; 6. "Took the Children Away" Released: 9 June 2023; 7. "Better Be Home Soon" Released: 30 June 2023; 8. "Even When I'm Sleeping" Released: 4 August 2023; 9. "One Step Ahead" Released: 11 August 2023; 10. "Heading in the Right Direction" Released: 25 August 2023; 11. "Ego Is Not a Dirty Word" Released: 1 September 2023; 12. "(I'm) Stranded" Released: 22 September 2023; 13. "Delete" Released: 27 September 2023; 14. "Get Free" Released: 27 October 2023; 15. "Rock It" Released: 3 November 2023; 16. "Black and Blue" Released: 10 November 2023; 17. "Can't Get You Out of My Head" Released: 17 November 2023

A compilation album titled Mushroom: Fifty Years of Making Noise (Reimagined) was released digitally on 24 November 2023 by Mushroom Records. The album featured several single releases throughout 2023.

=== Track listing ===
Mushroom: Fifty Years of Making Noise (Reimagined)
No.	Title	Writer(s)	Original Artist	Length
1.	"Throw Your Arms Around Me" (performed by Ed Sheeran)	John Archer, Geoffrey Crosby, Douglas Falconer, Jack Howard, Robert Miles, Mark Seymour, Michael Waters	Hunters & Collectors	3:30
2.	"Can't Get You Out of My Head" (performed by Amy Shark)	Cathy Dennis, Rob Davis	Kylie Minogue	3:03
3.	"Black and Blue" (performed by Jimmy Barnes and Joe Bonamassa)	Barry Harvey, Phil Manning, Barry Sullivan, Matt Taylor	Chain	4:11
4.	"Rock It" (performed by Vance Joy)	Dominic Byrne	Little Red	3:27
5.	"Under the Milky Way" (performed by The Temper Trap)	Steve Kilbey, Karin Jansson	The Church	4:20
6.	"Delete" (performed by Mia Wray [featuring Dean Brady])	Matthew Mason, Tommy O'Dell, Johnny Took	DMA's	4:13
7.	"(I'm) Stranded" (performed by Magic Dirt)	Chris Bailey, Ed Kuepper	The Saints	3:40
8.	"Ego Is Not a Dirty Word" (performed by Alex Lahey)	Greg Macainsh	Skyhooks	3:06
9.	"Heading in the Right Direction" (performed by Vika and Linda)	Garry Paige, Mark Punch	Renée Geyer Band	3:36
10.	"One Step Ahead" (performed by The Rubens)	Neil Finn	Split Enz	2:48
11.	"Even When I'm Sleeping" (performed by Mark Seymour)	Dean Manning	Leonardo's Bride	3:52
12.	"Better Be Home Soon" (performed by Budjerah [with WILSN])	Neil Finn	Crowded House	3:00
13.	"Took the Children Away" (performed by Dan Sultan)	Archie Roach	Archie Roach	6:36
14.	"Covered in Chrome" (performed by Gordi)	Luke Boerdam, Luke Henry, Michael Richards, James Tidswell	Violent Soho	3:23
15.	"Alone with You" (performed by Paul Kelly)	Jeremy Oxley	Sunnyboys	3:27
16.	"Hoops" (performed by Bliss n Eso)	Cameron Ludik, Jon Reichardt, Jonathan Notley, Max Mackinnon, Scott Baldwin, Elliott Margin, Izaac Margin, Sam Margin and William Zeglis	The Rubens	3:43
17.	"Wide Open Road" (performed by Missy Higgins)	David McComb	The Triffids	3:25
18.	"Get Free" (performed by Fidlar)	Craig Nicholls	the Vines	1:33
