= Singles and B sides =

Singles and B Sides

Compilation album by Skyhooks
- Released: 1994
- Genres: Pop rock, glam rock
- Label: Mushroom Records

Skyhooks chronology
The Latest and Greatest (1990)	Singles and B Sides (1994)	The Lost Album (1999)

Singles and B Sides is a compilation album released in 1994 by Australian band Skyhooks.

== Background ==
Following the release of The Latest and Greatest in 1992, Skyhooks were inducted into the ARIA Hall of Fame.

Following the induction, a combined stadium tour and album was proposed with fellow Australian band, Daddy Cool, scheduled for 1994.

Both bands recorded tracks for the album and the first single released was the double A-side single "Ballad of Oz"/ "Happy Hippy Hut", which peaked at number 35 in Australia. Due to lack of radio interest, the joint album and tour was eventually cancelled and Skyhooks disbanded.

Mushroom Records fulfilled the contract by releasing a compilation album of singles and B-sides.

== Track listing ==
CD version (D80984)

1. "Jukebox in Siberia"
2. "Tall Timber"
3. "Hot Rod James"
4. "Forging Ahead"
5. "Let It Rock"
6. "Broken Gin Bottle Baby"
7. "Don't Take Your Lurex to the Laundromat"
8. "Revolution" (US Version)
9. "Hooked on Hooks"
10. "You Just Like Me 'Cos I'm Good in Bed" (extended Remix)
11. "Jukebox in Siberia" (Non Recoupable Mix)
12. "Women in Uniform" (US Dance Mix)

Digital version

1. "Hot Rod James" – 4:43
2. "Broken Gin Bottle" – 4:13
3. "Don't Take Your Lurex to the Laundromat" – 3:18
4. "Whatever Happened to the Revolution" – 4:29
5. "Hooked on Hooks" – 6:18
6. "You Just Like Me 'Cos I'm Good in Bed" (extended remix) – 5:00
7. "Jukebox in Siberia" (Non Recoupable Mix) – 6:43
8. "Women in Uniform" (US Dance Mix) – 6:10
