= Live! Be in It =

Live album by Skyhooks
- Released: December 1978
- Recorded: December 1975–July 1978
- Venues: Sidney Myer Music Bowl, Festival Hall, Council Club Hotel, Commodore Hotel, Palais Theatre
- Genres: Pop rock, glam rock
- Length: 72:24
- Label: Mushroom Records
- Producer: Greg Macainsh

Skyhooks chronology
Guilty Until Proven Insane (1978)	Live! Be in It (1978)	The Best of Skyhooks (1979)

Live! Be in It is the first live album by Australian rock band Skyhooks. It was released by Mushroom Records on cassette and vinyl in December 1978 in Australia and on CD in 1991. The live recordings are taken from various concerts around Melbourne from December 1975 to July 1978.

== Track listing ==
Side A
No.	Title	Writer(s)	Length
1.	"Mercedes Ladies"	Greg Macainsh	3:41
2.	"Balwyn Calling"	Macainsh	4:52
3.	"Smartarse Songwriters"	Macainsh	5:20
4.	"Sitting in a Bar in Adelaide"	Macainsh	4:59

Side B
No.	Title	Writer(s)	Length
1.	"All My Friends Are Getting Married"	Macainsh	4:53
2.	"The Bruce Suite" (medley of "Big Bad Bruce", "Straight in a Gay Gay World" and "I'm Normal")	Macainsh	10:08
3.	"Kaboodleschnitzer Kommercials"	Imants "Freddie" Strauks	2:15

Side C
No.	Title	Writer(s)	Length
1.	"Wild in the Streets"	Garland Jeffreys	6:26
2.	"Do the Hook"	Macainsh	2:36
3.	"Why Dontcha All Get Fucked"	Macainsh	3:56
4.	"Brown Sugar"	Jagger/Richards	6:22

Side D
No.	Title	Writer(s)	Length
1.	"Bondage on the Boulevard"	Macainsh	3:51
2.	"Party to End All Parties"	Macainsh	3:27
3.	"Sex Is Not a Dirty Word"	Macainsh	4:38
4.	"Women in Uniform"	Macainsh	5:00

== Charts ==
Chart (1978/79)	Peak position
Australian Kent Music Report Albums Chart	84

== Personnel ==
- Greg Macainsh – bass guitar, vocals, production
- Steve Malpass – cover design, art direction (for Mushroom Art)
- Freddy Kaboodleschnitzer – drums, vocals
- Bob Spencer – guitar, vocals (tracks 1–5, 7–15)
- Bongo Starr – guitar, vocals (track 6)
- Red Symons – guitar, vocals (track 6)
- Michael Gudinski – management (for Worldwide Management)
- Merry Took – percussion (track 6)
- David Parker – cover photography
- Bob King – liner bag photography
- David Parker – liner bag photography
- Danny Robinson – vocals (track 6)
- Shirley Strachan – vocals
