= Ego: The Michael Gudinski Story =

2023 Australian documentary film

- Theatrical film poster
- Directed by: Paul Goldman
- Production company: Mushroom Studios
- Release dates: 10 August 2023 (MIFF); 31 August 2023 (Australia)
- Country: Australia
- Language: English

Ego: The Michael Gudinski Story is a 2023 Australian documentary film focusing on the life and career of Michael Gudinski, the founder of Mushroom Records.

The film's trailer was released in May 2023 and the film is set to premiere at the MIFF on 10 August 2023 before a broader cinematic release on 31 August 2023. MIFF is promoting the film as "a uniquely Australian tribute to a much-loved industry legend ".

The film includes commentary from Kylie Minogue, Dave Grohl, Sting, Shirley Manson, Jimmy Barnes, Ed Sheeran, Bruce Springsteen and Billy Joel.

The documentary won the AACTA Award for Best Sound in a Documentary at the AACTA Awards on 9 February 2024.

The film was also broadcast on the Seven Network.

== Awards ==
Year	Award	Category	Nominee(s)	Result	Ref.
2025	TV Week Logies	Best Factual or Documentary Program	Ego: The Michael Gudinski Story	Nominated	

== Soundtrack ==
Ego: The Michael Gudinski Story

Soundtrack album by various artists
- Released: 11 August 2023
- Label: Bloodlines

A soundtrack was released on 11 August 2023. The album contains 44 tracks by 33 different artists; all but two (Garbage and Ed Sheeran) are Australian.

=== Track listing ===
Disc one

1. "I Hear Motion" by Models
2. "Come Back Again" by Daddy Cool
3. "I Remember When I Was Young" by Matt Taylor
4. "Most People I Know (Think That I'm Crazy)" (Live from Sunbury) by Billy Thorpe & The Aztecs
5. "12lb Toothbrush" by Madder Lake
6. "Living in the 70's" by Skyhooks
7. "Love's Not Good Enough" by Skyhooks
8. "Horror Movie" by Skyhooks
9. "Ego (Is Not A Dirty Word)" by Skyhooks
10. "Hit & Run" by Jo Jo Zep & The Falcons
11. "Counting the Beat" by The Swingers
12. "Who Listens to the Radio" by The Sports
13. "Take a Long Line" (Live) by The Angels
14. "The Slab" by Hunters & Collectors
15. "Throw Your Arms Around Me" by Hunters & Collectors

Disc two

1. "Talking to a Stranger" by Hunters & Collectors
2. "From St Kilda to Kings Cross" by Paul Kelly
3. "Last of the Riverboats" by Stars
4. "I'd Die to Be with You Tonight" by Jimmy Barnes
5. "No Second Prize" by Jimmy Barnes
6. "Even When I'm Sleeping" by Leonardo's Bride
7. "Pressure Sway" by Machinations
8. "The Loco-Motion" by Kylie Minogue
9. "I Should Be So Lucky" by Kylie Minogue
10. "Took the Children Away" by Archie Roach
11. "Treaty" (Radio Mix) by Yothu Yindi
12. "It's Only the Beginning" by Deborah Conway
13. "Only Happy When It Rains" by Garbage
14. "Mysterious Girl" by Peter Andre

Disc three

1. "My Turn to Cry" by Cold Chisel
2. "Heading in the Right Direction" (Live) by Renée Geyer
3. "Addicted" by Bliss n Eso
4. "Can't Get You Out Of My Head" by Kylie Minogue
5. "Sweet Disposition" by The Temper Trap
6. "Forever Young" by Youth Group
7. "Riptide" by Vance Joy
8. "The A Team" by Ed Sheeran
9. "We're All in This Together" by Ben Lee
10. "The Glow" by DMA's
11. "Under the Milky Way" by The Church
12. "Extraordinary Life" by Gordi
13. "Djapana (Sunset Dreaming)" (Radio Mix) by Yothu Yindi
14. "Do You See What I See?" by Hunters & Collectors
15. "Say Goodbye" by Hunters & Collectors

=== Charts ===
Weekly chart performance for Ego: The Michael Gudinski Story
Chart (2023)	Peak position
Australian Albums (ARIA)	18

=== Year-end charts ===
Year-end chart performance for Ego: The Michael Gudinski Story
Chart (2023)	Position
Australian Artist Albums (ARIA)	14
Chart (2024)	Position
Australian Artist Albums (ARIA)	8
