= Straight in a Gay Gay World =

Studio album by Skyhooks
- Released: August 1976
- Studios: The Record Plant, Sausalito, California.
- Genre: Glam rock
- Length: 37:46
- Label: Mushroom
- Producer: Ross Wilson

Skyhooks chronology
Ego Is Not a Dirty Word (1975)	Straight in a Gay Gay World (1976)	The Skyhooks Tapes (1977)

Singles from Straight in a Gay Gay World
- 1. "Million Dollar Riff" Released: November 1975; 2. "This Is My City" Released: July 1976; 3. "Blue Jeans" Released: August 1976

Straight in a Gay Gay World is the third studio album by Australian rock band, Skyhooks. The album was released in August 1976. With the exception of "Million Dollar Riff", it was recorded at The Record Plant in Sausalito, California, after the band's first tour of the United States earlier in the same year. The title and songs are a sort of view the band had on their experience in the States. The album was produced by former Daddy Cool leader Ross Wilson. It peaked at No. 3 on the Australian charts.

At the Australian 1976 King of Pop Awards the album won Best Cover Design.

"Million Dollar Riff" was released as a single in November 1975 and it reached No. 6 in Australia. Two further singles were lifted from this album, "This Is My City" and "Blue Jeans", both in 1976 which peaked at No. 32 and No. 12 respectively on Australian charts.

== Background and release ==
In early 1976, Skyhooks travelled to United States to promote their two studio releases to date. US critics were unimpressed with The Philadelphia Inquirer saying "Skyhooks, to be blunt, is without a single redeeming quality." The Tribune called them "Australia's greatest disaster since Frank Sinatra made his last tour." The Niagara Falls Gazette believed they "totally lacked identity – they were no more than refugees from several other bands, plastic copies of the real thing".

After two months of touring, and before returning to Australia, the group were required per a newly signed deal with Phonogram Records in the United States, to record an album at the state-of-the-art The Record Plant in Sausalito, California. They had a budget of $60,000, four times that of Ego.

Bass player Greg Macainsh later reflected saying, “It was hard to capture the sound we wanted, The studio in Sausalito was a dead-sounding space. We weren't hearing the sound on tape we wanted." Drummer Freddy Strauks adding, "It was unfortunate that we had to do it at the end of the tour, because we were all really tired and really sick of living with each other 24 hours a day, seven days a week. The sessions were very, very tense."

Guitarist Red Symon later reflected saying "I can remember being in the United States and realising that I didn't really like playing the guitar anymore. It had become necessary for me to play the guitar; it wasn't something that I did for fun."

Macainsh's girlfriend, writer Jenny Brown, witnessed the drama in the Sausalito studio. "Straight in a Gay Gay World didn't feel very natural. The band was trying to progress and become more of an international band, which was probably against their nature."

When they returned home, the band revealing to TV Times "We tailored our patter to appeal to Americans." Ultimately, the US label, didn't release any singles from the album.

The album was released in August 1976. Red Symons quit the band five months later. Graeme "Shirley" Strachan after the next studio album.

Symons said "The first two albums were good, part of the reason they were good was all that material was conceived before the band was successful. When it came to a third album, we had a whole lot of associated pressures, like being in America. It was a struggle because it was post-success material. All the motivation had gone. It had become a job."

Prior to release, Strachan said of the songs in RAM, "Some of 'em are the strongest things the band's doing. There's one called "Sydney", that's all about Sydney. We were considering using it for a single instead of "Million Dollar Riff". And "I'm Normal". It's all about a guy who throws away his rubber sheets and dildos and vibrators and sex pills to get back to holding hands."

Macainsh said "Blue Jeans" had been an early song from the band. "Ross Wilson has always tried to get it recorded, but we've never been real keen on the idea til we got stuck for a song on this album. We wanted a couple of laidback tunes to round it off rather than have an album of ravers and up stuff."

== Reception ==
Reviewed in Australian music magazine RAM at the time of release, it was called, "methedrine power rock. It's jingle-jangley and crazy-tempered with guitar that shrill jackhammer like giant mosquitoes – dive-bombing into rhythms that are playing epileptic leap-frog around your stereo speakers." The song "Crazy Heart" was complimented for being "sweetly mellow" compared to the rest of the album.

== Track listing ==
Side A
No.	Title	Writer(s)	Length
1.	"Million Dollar Riff"	Greg Macainsh	3:50
2.	"Is This America?"	Macainsh	4:32
3.	"Blue Jeans"	Macainsh	2:30
4.	"Somewhere in Sydney"	Macainsh	3:46
5.	"The Girl Says She's Bored"	Macainsh	3:33

Side B
No.	Title	Writer(s)	Length
1.	"This Is My City"	Macainsh	3:40
2.	"Straight in a Gay Gay World"	Macainsh	4:29
3.	"I'm Normal"	Macainsh	3:15
4.	"Mumbo Jumbo"	Red Symons	3:24
5.	"Crazy Heart"	Macainsh	4:47

== Personnel ==
- Shirley Strachan – lead vocals
- Red Symons – guitar, backing and lead (9) vocals, keyboards
- Bob "Bongo" Starkie – guitar, backing vocals
- Greg Macainsh – bass guitar, backing vocals
- Imants Alfred Strauks – drums, backing vocals, percussion

== Charts ==
Chart performance for Straight in a Gay Gay World
Chart (1976)	Peak position
Australian Kent Music Report Albums Chart	3
