= Our House (Australian TV series) =

- Genre: Lifestyle; Home Renovation
- Presented by: Shirley Strachan; Reg Livermore; Rebecca Gilling; Tracey Dale (1993–1997); Suzie Wilks (1998–1999); Tara Dennis (2000–2001); Peter Harris (1995–2000)
- Country of origin: Australia
- Original language: English
- No. of seasons: 9
- No. of episodes: 400+

Production
- Running time: 30–60 minutes

Original release
- Network: Nine Network
- Release: 23 June 1993 – 25 November 2001

Our House is an Australian lifestyle and home renovation factual television series that aired on the Nine Network from 1993 until 2001. It was presented by musician and former Skyhooks band member front man Shirley Strachan, Reg Livermore, Rebecca Gilling, Tracey Dale (1993–1997), Suzie Wilks (1998–1999), Tara Dennis (2000–2001) and Peter Harris (1995–2000). Strachan had previously fronted a children's TV program, Shirl's Neighbourhood.

On 29 August 2001, Strachan died in a helicopter accident. The final episode of Our House, a Christmas-themed special, paid tribute to Strachan.

In late 2001, Nine announced on their corporate site that they were planning to develop new episodes of Our House for broadcast in 2002. However, this did not materialize and the show did not return to air.
