= Hot for the Orient =

Studio album by Skyhooks
- Released: 1980
- Recorded: AAV Studios, Melbourne
- Length: 36:07
- Label: Mushroom Records
- Producer: Eddie Leonetti

Skyhooks chronology
The Best of Skyhooks (1979)	Hot for the Orient (1980)	Live in the 80's (1983)

Singles from Hot for the Orient
- 1. "Over the Border" Released: April 1979; 2. "This Town Is Boring" Released: February 1980; 3. "Keep the Junk in America" Released: 8 May 1980; 4. "White Skin Black Sheets" Released: 1980

Hot for the Orient is the fifth and final studio album from Australian glam rock band Skyhooks. This was the only album the band recorded without its second, and best-known, vocalist Graeme "Shirley" Strachan, who had been replaced with Tony Williams. The album peaked at number 64 on the Australian charts, and was the band's first studio album to fail to reach the Australian top ten. Skyhooks disbanded soon after but reformed in 1983 with the line-up which had recorded its first three albums, though it would not release new studio material until 1990.

Video clips for "Over the Border" and "Keep the Junk in America" appeared on Countdown. A live performance at the Bombay Rock was simulcast on television show Nightmoves and radio station 3RRR to debut the album.

The album was reissued on CD and re-released as part of the Skyhooks Roadcase boxset in 1996.

At the time of release, songwriter Macainsh said, "Over the past five albums, the band has dabbled in a variety of styles but with this album it will be a case of if you like one song you'll like all the others. There's a few more songs about girls and a touch of politics."

== Track listing ==
All songs written by Greg Macainsh.

Side A
No.	Title	Length
1.	"Bondage on the Boulevarde"	3:58
2.	"This Town is Boring"	4:00
3.	"White Skin and Black Sheets"	3:47
4.	"She's Okay But She's Not You"	4:43
5.	"Cars, Bars and Girls"	2:58

Side B
No.	Title	Length
1.	"Red Fingernails"	4:10
2.	"My Heart Gets Blown to Bits"	2:51
3.	"Fathers and Daughters"	4:42
4.	"No Inspiration"	3:14
5.	"Keep the Junk in America"	4:51

== Charts ==
Chart (1980)	Peak position
Australian Kent Music Report Albums Chart	64

== Personnel ==
- Tony Williams - lead vocals
- Bob Spencer - guitar, backing vocals
- Bob "Bongo" Starkie - guitar, backing vocals, lead vocals on "Keep the Junk in America"
- Greg Macainsh - bass guitar, backing vocals, lead vocals on "Cars, Bars and Girls"
- Imants Alfred Strauks - drums, backing vocals, percussion, lead vocals on "My Heart Gets Blown to Bits"
