= Megamix =

Medley remix containing multiple songs in rapid succession

- Other names: Mega-mix
- Stylistic origins: Sound collage; medley; electronic; disco; hip-hop
- Cultural origins: 1980s
- Derivative forms: Bastard pop; mashup

Other topics
- Remix; sampling; electronic dance music; pastiche; bootleg

A megamix is a remix containing multiple songs in rapid succession. It often features various artists. There may be only one verse or even just a brief chorus of each song used, sometimes in addition to samples of the same or other songs. It is common to use different samples to maintain and sometimes even ridicule the original. To unify the songs together smoothly, a single backing beat may be added as background throughout the megamix, although this is not a must. This backing beat is kept basic so as to simplify mixing and to not compete with the music. These mixes are usually several minutes long at minimum, going up to a half-hour or an hour, or even more sometimes.

According to author Eduardo Navas, megamixes are constructed with the same principles as medleys, but differ in that while medleys typically utilise single bands to play the excerpted compositions, megamixes use DJ producers to sample recognisable sections of songs and then sequence them "to create what is essentially an extended collage: an electronic medley consisting of samples from pre-existing sources." The purpose of the megamix, he argues, is "to present a musical collage riding on a uniting groove to create a type of pastiche that allows the listener to recall a whole time period and not necessarily one single artist or composition."

Ultimix is known for "flashback medleys," producing at least one or two every year based on popular songs of the year. Each is about 15 minutes long, usually with at least that many songs if not more.

"Album megamixes" feature all tracks from a particular album edited and compiled into one continuous medley. The "artist megamix" is also popular, including songs spanning a musician's career, with prolific artists such as Michael Jackson having more than one, usually from different remixers. Duran Duran created a megamix single ("Burning the Ground") from their own hits for the 1989 greatest hits album Decade. Subsequently, artists such as Madonna, Britney Spears, and Janet Jackson have also released megamixes as singles in order to promote their greatest hits albums or in the latter's case, studio album. Many megamixes are bootlegs.

== Origins and influence ==
The roots of the megamix come from the practice of sampling in disco and hip-hop music. Navas cites hip-hop artist Grandmaster Flash's "The Adventures of Grandmaster Flash on the Wheels of Steel" (1981), particularly the manner in which the track cuts and switches between different songs, as an influence on megamixes "that were produced in the music studio from actual samples", naming as an example the 1984 electro funk track "Tommy Boy Megamix", which contains samples of the most popular songs on hip-hop label Tommy Boy Records.

James Masterton, writing in 1997, commented that megamixes are popular with DJs in Continental Europe. Megamixes were particularly popular in Europe over the summer of 1988, with a Boney M version becoming a massive hit. An exception to the popularity was the United Kingdom until the turn of the 1990s, when megamixes by Technotronic, Black Box and Snap! became popular, leading to further megamix hits from Gloria Estefan and Boney M. As of 1997, Masterton believed the fad had passed in the UK.

Navas writes that in the 1990s, the megamix aesthetic appeared "in the forms of bastard pop and bootleg culture often linked to culture jamming", and names Negativland as one of the era's better-known practitioners. He added: "The music mashups of today [2012] follow the principle of the '80s megamix."

== Musical acts that have official megamixes ==
- 49ers
- Ace of Base
- Alexander O'Neal
- Anastacia
- Aqua
- Avicii
- Ayumi Hamasaki
- Bananarama
- Basshunter
- The Beatles
- Black Box
- Bobby Brown
- Bomb the Bass
- Boney M
- Booty Luv
- Britney Spears
- Caramell
- Christina Aguilera
- Corona
- Daft Punk
- Death Grips
- Debbie Gibson (one in 1988, Atlantic DM 86556, track 4)
- Depeche Mode
- DJ Bobo
- Duran Duran
- Earth, Wind & Fire
- Erasure
- E-Rotic
- E-Type
- Five
- Fun Fun
- Girls Aloud
- Gloria Estefan – "Megamix"
- Gloria Gaynor
- Grace Jones
- Grandmaster Melle Mel
- Heaven 17
- High School Musical on Stage!
- Hudson Mohawke
- Insane Clown Posse
- Janet Jackson
- Joseph and the Amazing Technicolor Dreamcoat
- Jive Bunny and the Mastermixers
- Justin Timberlake has released one in Japan
- Katy Perry of the six singles from her Teenage Dream album
- Kim Wilde
- La Bouche
- Lisa "Left Eye" Lopes
- Luv'
- Madness
- Madonna
- Masterboy
- Michael Jackson
- Modern Talking – "Space Mix '98"
- Paula Abdul
- Pet Shop Boys, notably Disco 2
- Pussycat Dolls, for all their singles tracks on their first album PCD
- Roxette
- Samantha Fox
- Sammi Cheng
- Sandy Marton on his 2005 compilation People From Ibiza - The Very Best Of (Deluxe Edition)
- Salt-N-Pepa on their 1992 album, Rapped in Remixes: The Greatest Hits Remixed
- Sash
- Scooter
- Shakira
- Six
- Skyhooks – "Hooked on Hooks"
- Snap! – "Mega Mix"
- Spice Girls
- Starlight Express
- Status Quo
- Steps – "Platinum Megamix"
- Tiësto
- 2 Unlimited
- Technotronic – "Megamix"
- Tenacious D
- Tina Turner
- TLC
- Ultrabeat
- The Village People

== See also ==
- Mashup
- Medley
- Music editing
- Remix
