= Jukebox in Siberia =

1990 single by Skyhooks

Single by Skyhooks

from the album The Latest and Greatest
- Released: 1 October 1990
- Length: 3:53
- Label: Mushroom
- Songwriter: Greg Macainsh
- Producer: Ross Fraser

Skyhooks singles chronology
"Hooked on Hooks" (1982)	"Jukebox in Siberia" (1990)	"Tall Timber" (1990)

"Jukebox in Siberia" is a song by the Australian pop rock band Skyhooks, released in October 1990 as the lead single from the group's compilation album, The Latest and Greatest. It was the group's first new recording in almost a decade and featured the classic line-up of the band. The song was written by their bass guitarist, Greg Macainsh; his lyrics consider Russia under the rule of Gorbachev during the era of glasnost ("openness") and perestroika ("restructuring").

The single was produced by Ross Fraser and peaked at number one on the Australian ARIA Singles Chart. "Jukebox in Siberia" was Skyhooks' only ARIA number-one single; however, the band had achieved a number-one single on the Kent Music Report with "Horror Movie" in 1975.

== Background ==
Skyhooks formed in 1973, and by the middle of the following year, the classic line-up of Greg Macainsh on bass guitar, Bob Starkie (p.k.a. Bongo Starr) on guitar, Shirley Strachan on lead vocals, Imants "Freddie" Strauks on drums and Red Symons on guitar was in place. The group had disbanded in 1984, but in 1988 Macainsh began working on new material, which led to two new songs: "Jukebox in Siberia" and "Tall Timber". "Jukebox in Siberia" was released as a single on 1 October 1990 and peaked at number one on the Australian ARIA Singles Chart, which opened the band to a new audience. As a result, their record label Mushroom Records decided to release a new compilation album in the November, The Latest and Greatest. The album's new tracks, including "Jukebox in Siberia", were produced by Ross Fraser (John Farnham). Skyhooks undertook an Australian tour to promote the album from December 1990 and issued "Tall Timber" in the following month, which reached the top 100, however the group disbanded again soon after.

== Track listing ==
7-inch single (K 10194)
No.	Title	Writer(s)	Length
1.	"Jukebox in Siberia"	Greg Macainsh	3:53
2.	"Jukebox in Siberia" (karaoke version)	Macainsh	3:53

CD single (D10194) and 12-inch single (X14901)
No.	Title	Writer(s)	Length
1.	"Jukebox in Siberia"	Greg Macainsh	3:53
2.	"Jukebox in Siberia" (karaoke version)	Macainsh	3:53
3.	"Jukebox in Siberia" (Non-Recoupable Mix)	Macainsh	6:49

== Charts ==
=== Weekly charts ===
Chart (1990)	Peak position
Australia (ARIA)	1
New Zealand (Recorded Music NZ)	32

=== Year-end charts ===
Chart (1990)	Position
Australia (ARIA)	30

== Certifications ==
Region	Certification	Certified units/sales
Australia (ARIA)	Gold	35,000^{^}
^{^} Shipments figures based on certification alone.
