= Shirl's Neighbourhood =

- Starring: Graeme "Shirley" Strachan
- Country of origin: Australia
- Original language: English
- No. of episodes: 900+

Production
- Producers: Jennifer Hooks, Richard Bence
- Running time: 30 minutes

Original release
- Network: Seven Network (Seven Melbourne)
- Release: April 2, 1979 – 1983

Shirl's Neighbourhood was an Australian afternoon children's television series which first aired on the Seven Network on Monday the 2nd April 1979 and continued Monday to Fridays till 1983. The half-hour show featured former Skyhooks frontman Graeme "Shirley" Strachan and co-host Liz Rule alongside a cast of characters including Norm The Kangaroo, Ol' Possum, Claude The Crow, Stanley The Snake, Greenfinger the Garden Gnome, Yippee the Bunyip, Igor the Spider, Bartholomew the Sheep and a band of monkeys. Franciscus Henri appeared in the show as a regular, both as himself presenting musical segments and as "Professor Henri" in comical sketches. He left the show in October 1980. Bruce Spence was a gardener early in the series.

Norm the Kangaroo was played by Don Bridges. The other characters were puppets created and brought to life by Ron Mueck.

== Production ==
Shirl's Neighbourhood was produced by Jenifer Hooks and Richard Bence of Puppetstuff. It ran from 1979 till 1983 and clocked up over 900 episodes. Jenifer Hooks later went on to head Film Victoria and Cinemedia.

Regular segments were Possum's Patterns with Auntie Mae, Greenfinger's Garden with Laurie Ryan and later Bruce Spence. Fritz Martin appeared regularly with various animals and wildlife.

The show was very popular with kids and adults alike. This was due mainly to the character of Claude the Crow. Claude had a slightly more cynical view of the world than the other characters (like Oscar the Grouch from Sesame Street), and adults could identify with this.
