= Peter Starkie =

Australian musical artist (1948–2020)

- Born: Peter George Starkie; 21 August 1948; Sydney, Australia
- Origin: Melbourne, Australia
- Died: 14 September 2020 (aged 72) Melbourne, Australia
- Genre: Rock
- Occupation: Musician
- Instruments: Guitar; vocals
- Years active: 1965–2020

Peter George Starkie (21 August 1948 – 14 September 2020) was an Australian rock musician. He was the founding guitarist of Skyhooks in 1973 and joined Jo Jo Zep & the Falcons in 1975. His younger brother, Bob "Bongo" Starkie, replaced him on guitar in Skyhooks. Peter Starkie died on 14 September 2020, aged 72, of complications arising from a fall.

== Life and career ==
=== Early life ===
Peter George Starkie was born on 21 August 1948, in Sydney to Ronald Keith Starkie (1923–2018) and Mary Linskill Starkie (nee Taylor, 1923–2014). He was the eldest of four children, including younger brother Bob "Bongo" Starkie.

Starkie's father was an RAAF wing commander and World War II veteran. The family periodically moved due to his father's postings, including the Woomera Rocket Range (c. 1955), Melbourne (late 1950s), Canberra (c. 1959), London (1961–1963) and then returned to Melbourne. While living in London, Starkie took guitar lessons. Upon return to Melbourne, he attended Glen Waverley High School and Melbourne High School before completing a science degree at the University of Melbourne.

=== Music career ===
While at Glen Waverley High he started a band, the King Bees, with Dave Flett in the mid-1960s. They were joined by Joe Camilleri on vocals, who later recalled, "[they] spotted me and because they didn't have a singer, they asked me to join ... They played all the stuff on the radio, including the Beatles and the Stones. I joined the band that night... But then Dave and Peter decided to go to university, so I was a bit lost."

By the early 1970s, Starkie and Flett had formed Lipp and the Double Dekker Brothers, which variously included Avril Bell, Fred Cass, Jane Clifton on vocals, Paul Madigan, Arty Trippie, Ian Wallace and Bruce Woodcock. Camilleri joined the line-up in 1972 and explained:

"we were experimenting with the blues. Everything was elastic and free. We were listening to Robert Johnson, but trying to play it like John Coltrane ... Everything was so abstract."

After that group disbanded, Starkie formed Skyhooks in March 1973 on lead guitar, alongside Steve Hill on lead vocals (ex-Lillee), Peter Inglis on guitar (ex-the Captain Matchbox Whoopee Band), Greg Macainsh on bass guitar and backing vocals and Imants "Freddie" Strauks on drums and backing vocals.

Starkie left Skyhooks in August 1973 and was replaced on guitar by his younger brother, Bob. Starkie, Camelieri and Flett formed Roger Rocket and the Millionaires, which became the house band for a strip club, featuring Mary "Doody" Scott Pilkington. Her manager, and Starkie's former band mate, Madigan organised a tour of mining towns in Western Australia, Camilleri described how "we'd be Doody's backing band. We were also her roadies and security. We wore white boiler suits, with our names emblazoned on them ... But the tour fell apart when we hit Port Hedland." They returned to Melbourne where, in 1975, Starkie, on guitar, joined Camilieri in Jo Jo Zep & the Falcons. He later formed the Peter Starkie Trio. After his former band mate, Steve Hill, announced being diagnosed with liver cancer, the original line-up of Skyhooks reformed for a benefit gig in September 2005 at the Annandale Hotel, Sydney. Hill died in late October 2005, aged 52.

According to Bob Starkie, "[Peter] has played semi-regularly with Paul Madigan (for which he should have received a medal) and has maintained a constant playing relationship with Peter Inglis."

=== Death ===
On 13 September 2020, Starkie was renovating his mother-in-law's home in Shepparton when he fell from a ladder and was seriously injured. He was air-lifted to the Royal Melbourne Hospital where he was treated "but was unable to be saved". He died on 14 September 2020, aged 72, and was survived by his partner, Diana, his daughters and his siblings. He was accorded tributes by music promoter Michael Gudinski, who had signed Skyhooks to his Mushroom Records label, as well as fellow band member Red Symons.
