= Ego Is Not a Dirty Word =

1975 album by Skyhooks

Studio album by Skyhooks
- Released: July 1975
- Recorded: January–May 1975
- Studios: TCS Studios, Melbourne
- Length: 40:09
- Label: Mushroom
- Producer: Ross Wilson (as Duke Wilson)

Skyhooks chronology
Living in the 70's (1974)	Ego Is Not a Dirty Word (1975)	Straight in a Gay Gay World (1976)

Singles from Ego Is Not a Dirty Word
- 1. "Ego Is Not a Dirty Word" Released: 9 April 1975; 2. "All My Friends Are Getting Married" Released: June 1975

Ego Is Not a Dirty Word is the second studio album released by Australian rock band, Skyhooks, in July 1975. The album was the follow-up to their highly successful debut album, Living in the 70's (1974). As with the former album, it was also produced by Ross Wilson.

The album spent 11 weeks at the number-one spot in the Australian Kent Music Report Albums Chart and sold over 200,000 copies. Two singles were lifted from the album, "Ego Is Not a Dirty Word" and "All My Friends are Getting Married".

The American release of the album contained "Horror Movie" and "You Just Like Me 'Cause I'm Good in Bed" from their first album in place of tracks 9 and 10. The album was re-released by Mushroom Records in 1997.

At the Australian 1975 King of Pop Awards the album won Most Popular Australian Album. At the 1975 Australian Record Awards, the album won Group Album of the Year.

Professional ratings
Review scores
Source	Rating
AllMusic	4.5/5 stars

== Track listing ==
Side A
No.	Title	Writer(s)	Length
1.	"Ego Is Not a Dirty Word"	Greg Macainsh	2:58
2.	"Love on the Radio"	Macainsh, Steve Hill	4:20
3.	"Saturday Night"	Macainsh	2:45
4.	"Love's Not Good Enough"	Macainsh	7:15
5.	"The Other Side"	Macainsh	3:12

Side B
No.	Title	Writer(s)	Length
1.	"Smartarse Songwriters"	Macainsh	4:09
2.	"Mercedes Ladies"	Macainsh	4:29
3.	"All My Friends Are Getting Married"	Macainsh	4:50
4.	"Every Chase a Steeple"	Red Symons	3:41
5.	"Private Eye"	Macainsh	3:00

== Charts ==
=== Weekly charts ===
Chart (1975)	Peak position
Australian Kent Music Report Albums Chart	1
Canada Top Albums/CDs (RPM)	59

=== Year-end charts ===
Chart (1975)	Position
Australian Kent Music Report Albums Chart	4

== Certifications ==
Region	Certification	Certified units/sales
Australia	—	350,000

== Personnel ==
Skyhooks

- Shirley Strachan – lead vocals
- Red Symons – guitar, backing vocals, piano (9)
- Bob "Bongo" Starkie – guitar, backing vocals
- Greg Macainsh – bass guitar, backing vocals
- Imants Alfred Strauks – drums, percussion, backing vocals

Additional musicians

- Ross Wilson (as Duke Wilson) – producer
- Peter Jones – Fender Rhodes electric piano (2, 8), marimba and vibraphone (1), chimes (3), boobams (4)
- Greg Sneddon – Arp synthesiser (10)
- Andy Cowan – Minimoog synthesizer (10)
- Col Loughnan – tenor and baritone saxophones (6)
- Pat Wilson – finger cymbals (1)
- Ross Wilson – Yamaha synthesiser (1), vocal harmonies
- Ian Mason – harmony vocals (8)
- Jenny Keath – harmony vocals (1)
