= This Is My City =

Single by Skyhooks

from the album Straight in a Gay Gay World
- B-side: "Somewhere in Sydney"
- Released: July 1976
- Studio: The Record Plant, Sausalito, California
- Length: 3:37
- Label: Mushroom Records
- Songwriter(s): Greg Macainsh
- Producer(s): Ross Wilson

Skyhooks singles chronology
"Let It Rock (live)" (1976)	"This Is My City" (1976)	"Blue Jeans" (1976)

"This Is My City" is a song by Australian band Skyhooks, released in July 1976 as the second single from the band's third studio album, Straight in a Gay Gay World. The song peaked at number 32 in Australia.

Author Macainsh said, "There's a bit of a comment there... maybe not a heavy social comment... it's just about whatever city you're living in. You might hate it, but it's best to love it."

== Track listing ==
7" single (K-6487)

- Side A "This Is My City" - 3:37
- Side B "Somewhere in Sydney" - 3:44

== Charts ==
Chart (1976)	Peak position
Australia (Kent Music Report)	32
