= Blue Jeans (Skyhooks song) =

"This Is My City"

Single by Skyhooks

from the album Straight in a Gay Gay World
- B-side: "Somewhere in Sydney"
- Released: July 1976
- Studio: The Record Plant, Sausalito, California
- Length: 3:37
- Label: Mushroom Records
- Songwriter: Greg Macainsh
- Producer: Ross Wilson

Skyhooks singles chronology
"Let It Rock (live)" (1976)	"This Is My City" (1976)	"Party to End All Parties" (1977)

"Blue Jeans" is a song by Australian band Skyhooks, released in August 1976 as the third and final single from the band's third studio album, Straight in a Gay Gay World. The song peaked at number 12 in Australia and at number three in New Zealand where it was certified gold.

== Details ==
Author Macainsh said, "Blue Jeans is more of what you'd call social comment. We used to do it when we first started. Ross Wilson has always tried to get it recorded, but we've never been real keen on the idea til we got stuck for a song on this album. We wanted a couple of laidback tunes to round it off rather than have an album of ravers and up stuff. So we tried it and it came out well."

Being an older song, Wilson's Doo Dah Music owned the publishing. Singer Shirley Strachan accused producer Wilson of wanting the song included for his own profit, asking him, "So why do you get so much money? You're not even in the band."

== Track listing ==
7" single (K-6542)

- Side A "Blue Jeans" – 2:30
- Side B "Mumbo Jumbo" – 3:20

== Charts ==
=== Weekly charts ===
Weekly chart performance for "Blue Jeans"
Chart (1976)	Peak position
Australia (Kent Music Report)	12
New Zealand (Recorded Music NZ)	3

=== Year-end charts ===
Year-end chart performance for "Blue Jeans"
Chart (1976)	Position
Australia (Kent Music Report)	68

== Certifications ==
Region	Certification	Certified units/sales
New Zealand (RMNZ)	Gold	10,000^{*}
^{^} Shipments figures based on certification alone.
