= Million Dollar Riff =

Single by Skyhooks

from the album Straight in a Gay Gay World
- B-side: "Forging Ahead"
- Released: November 1975
- Studio: TCS Studios, Melbourne
- Genre: Glam rock
- Length: 3:51
- Label: Mushroom Records
- Songwriter(s): Greg Macainsh
- Producer(s): Duke Wilson

Skyhooks singles chronology
| "All My Friends Are Getting Married" (1975) | "Million Dollar Riff" (1975) | "Let It Rock (live)" (1976) |

"Million Dollar Riff" is a song by Australian band Skyhooks, released in November 1975 as the lead single from the band's third studio album, Straight in a Gay Gay World. The song peaked at number six in Australia.

The song incorporates riffs from other hit songs, including from the Skyhooks' own "Horror Movie", plus the worldwide hits "Satisfaction", "Smoke on the Water", "Sunshine of Your Love", "Day Tripper", "Gloria", and Chuck Berry's "Johnny B. Goode". It also includes lyrical allusions to Berry's "Little Queenie" ("Meanwhile, I was still..."), Sam Cooke's "Chain Gang" ("Ooh, Ah. Ooh, Ah"), and Barrett Strong's "Money (That's What I Want)".

== Track listing ==
7" single (K-6159)

- Side A "Million Dollar Riff" - 3:51
- Side B "Forging Ahead" - 4:04

== Charts ==
=== Weekly charts ===
| Chart (1975/76) | Peak position |
|---|---|
| Australia (Kent Music Report) | 6 |

=== Year-end charts ===
| Chart (1975) | Peak position |
|---|---|
| Australia (Kent Music Report) | 98 |
| Chart (1976) | Peak position |
| Australia (Kent Music Report) | 78 |
