= Party to End All Parties =

Single by Skyhooks

from the album The Skyhooks Tapes
- B-side: "Hot Rod James"
- Released: April 1977
- Studio: TCS Studios, Melbourne
- Length: 3:17
- Label: Mushroom Records
- Songwriter: Greg Macainsh
- Producers: John French and Greg Macainsh

Skyhooks singles chronology
"Blue Jeans" (1976)	"Party to End All Parties" (1977)	"Women in Uniform" (1978)

"Party to End All Parties" is a song by Australian band Skyhooks, released in April 1977 as the first and only single from the band's first compilation album, The Skyhooks Tapes. The song peaked at number 24 in Australia.

== Track listing ==
7" single (K-6761)

- Side A "Party to End All Parties" - 2:30
- Side B "Hot Rod James" - 4:44

== Charts ==
Chart (1977)	Peak position
Australia (Kent Music Report)	24
