= All My Friends Are Getting Married =

Single by Skyhooks

from the album Ego Is Not a Dirty Word
- B-side: "Saturday Night"
- Released: June 1975
- Studio: TCS Studios, Melbourne
- Genre: Glam rock
- Length: 4:50
- Label: Mushroom Records
- Songwriter: Greg Macainsh
- Producer: Ross Wilson (as Duke Wilson)

Skyhooks singles chronology
| "Ego is Not a Dirty Word" (1975) | "All My Friends Are Getting Married" (1975) | "Million Dollar Riff" (1975) |

"All My Friends Are Getting Married" is a song by Australian band Skyhooks, released in June 1975 as the second and final single from the band's second studio album, Ego Is Not a Dirty Word. It is written by the group's bass guitarist, Greg Macainsh and was produced by Ross Wilson. The song peaked at number two in Australia.

== Background ==
Australian rock band Skyhooks issued "All My Friends Are Getting Married" in June 1975 as the second single from their second studio album, Ego Is Not a Dirty Word (July 1975). The line-up was Greg Macainsh on bass guitar and backing vocals, Bob "Bongo" Starkie on guitar and backing vocals, Shirley Strachan on lead vocals, Imants "Freddie" Strauks on drums, percussion and backing vocals and Red Symons on guitar and backing vocals.

Skyhooks' most recent tour had ended in April 1975 whereupon Strachan took two weeks off and considered leaving the band, however he returned – newly married – as the group continued recording the album. "All My Friends Are Getting Married" was written by Macainsh. Along with the rest of the album it was produced by Ross Wilson (as Duke Wilson), who had also produced their debut album Living in the 70's (October 1974). In Tony Catterall's review of the album for The Canberra Times he rated "All My Friends Are Getting Married" as one of its two best tracks. He described it as "bitter-sweet" and behind its "seemingly simplistic view" of the subject it is enhanced by Strachan's "wistful" delivery. The single peaked at No. 2 on the Kent Music Report.

== Track listing ==
7" single (K-6021)

- Side A "All My Friends Are Getting Married" (Greg Macainsh) – 4:50
- Side B "Saturday Night" (Macainish) – 2:45

== Charts ==
=== Weekly charts ===
| Chart (1975) | Peak position |
|---|---|
| Australia (Kent Music Report) | 2 |

=== Year-end charts ===
| Chart (1975) | Position |
|---|---|
| Australia (Kent Music Report) | 22 |
