= Skyhooks (band) =

Australian rock band

- Skyhooks: "Horror Movie" (1974). Freddie Strauks, "Shirley" Strachan, Greg Macainsh Crouching: Bob Starkie, Red Symons

Background information
- Origin: Melbourne, Victoria, Australia
- Genres: Glam rock, rock, pop rock
- Years active: 1973–1980, 1983, 1984, 1990, 1994
- Labels: Mushroom; Interfusion; Phonogram; Mercury; Attic; United Artists; Festival
- Past members: Greg Macainsh; Freddie Strauks; Steve Hill; Peter Inglis; Peter Starkie; Bob Starkie; Red Symons; Graeme "Shirley" Strachan; Bob Spencer; Tony Williams
- Website: skyhooks-music.com

Skyhooks were an Australian rock band formed in Melbourne in 1973. Their classic lineup (1974–1977) comprised Graeme "Shirley" Strachan (vocals), Greg Macainsh (bass and backing vocals), Red Symons (guitar, vocals, keyboards), Bob "Bongo" Starkie (guitar and backing vocals), and Freddie Strauks (drums).

Known for their flamboyant costumes and makeup, their music addressed a variety of issues including drugs, sex, and the gay scene while frequently referencing Australian places and culture. Evolving from a series of groups with Macainsh and Strauks in the late 1960s and early 1970s, they rose to national prominence when their debut album Living in the 70's (1974), which was initially a moderate success upon release, gained unprecedented popularity the following year, aided by the nascent ABC music show Countdown; the album topped the Australian Kent Music Report chart for a record-breaking 16 weeks and sold over 200,000 copies, becoming the best-selling Australian album at the time. Their second album Ego Is Not a Dirty Word (1975) topped the Kent Music Report for 11 weeks.

Symons and Strachan left in 1977 and 1978 respectively and became media personalities; Symons was replaced with Bob Spencer and Strachan was replaced with Tony Williams, before they disbanded in 1980. The classic lineup reunited four times in the ensuing years, with reunions in 1990 and 1994 producing new material, including the number-one song "Jukebox in Siberia" in 1990. Strachan died in a helicopter crash in 2001; original lead singer Steve Hill, who left and was replaced by Strachan, died in 2005; original guitarist Peter Starkie died in 2020, and Bob Starkie died in 2025.

Music historian Ian McFarlane stated that the band "made an enormous impact on Australian social life". In 1992, the group was inducted into the Australian Recording Industry Association (ARIA) Hall of Fame. In 2011, the Skyhooks album Living in the 70's was added to the National Film and Sound Archive of Australia's Sounds of Australia registry.

== History ==
=== 1966–1974: Early years and formation ===
Greg Macainsh and Freddie Strauks both attended Norwood High School in the Melbourne suburb of Ringwood and formed Spare Parts in 1966 with Macainsh on bass guitar and Strauks on lead vocals. Spare Parts was followed by Sound Pump in 1968, Macainsh formed Reuben Tice in Eltham, with Tony Williams on vocals. By 1970 Macainsh was back with Strauks, now on drums, first in Claptrap and by 1971 in Frame which had Graeme "Shirley" Strachan as lead vocalist. Frame also included Pat O'Brien on guitar and Cynthio Ooms on guitar. Strachan had befriended Strauks earlier—he sang with Strauks on the way to parties—and was asked to join Claptrap which was renamed as Frame. Strachan stayed in Frame for about 18 months but left for a career in carpentry and a hobby of surfing in Phillip Island.

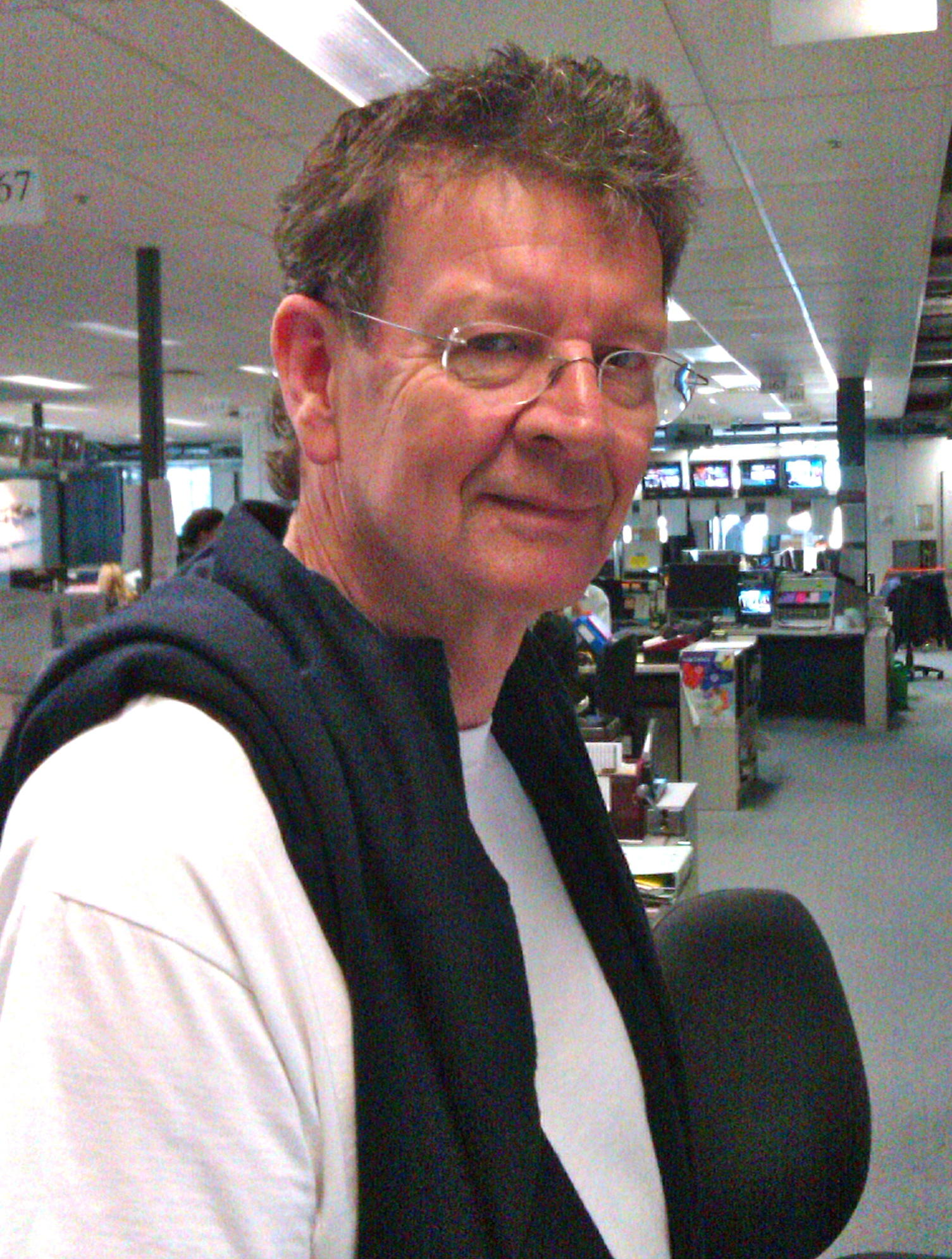
Skyhooks guitarist Red Symons, who replaced founder Peter Inglis in August 1973. (1973–1977, 1983, 1984, 1990, 1994, pictured in 2011)

Skyhooks formed in March 1973 in Melbourne with Steve Hill on vocals (ex-Lillee), Peter Inglis on guitar (The Captain Matchbox Whoopee Band), Macainsh on bass guitar and backing vocals, Peter Starkie on guitar and backing vocals (Lipp & the Double Dekker Brothers) and Strauks on drums and backing vocals. The name, Skyhooks, came from a fictional organisation in the 1956 film Earth vs. the Flying Saucers. Their first gig was on 16 April 1973 at St Jude's Church hall in Carlton. At a later gig, former Daddy Cool frontman, Ross Wilson was playing in his group Mighty Kong with Skyhooks as a support act. Wilson was impressed with the fledgling band and signed Macainsh to a publishing deal. In August, Bob "Bongo" Starkie (Mary Jane Union) on guitar replaced his older brother Peter (later in Jo Jo Zep & The Falcons) and Inglis was replaced by Red Symons on guitar, vocals and keyboards. The two new members added a touch of theatre and humour to the band's visual presence. By late 1973, Wilson had convinced Michael Gudinski to sign the band to his booking agency, Australian Entertainment Exchange, and eventually to Gudinski's label, Mushroom Records.

Skyhooks gained a cult following around Melbourne including university intelligentsia and pub rockers, but a poorly received show at the January 1974 Sunbury Pop Festival saw the group booed off stage. Two tracks from their live set, "Hey What's the Matter?" and "Love on the Radio" appeared on Mushroom's Highlights of Sunbury '74. After seeing his performance on TV, Hill phoned Macainsh and resigned. To replace Hill, in March, Macainsh recruited occasional singer, surfer and carpenter Strachan from his Frame era. Strachan had been dubbed "Shirley" by fellow surfers due to his curly blond hair a la Shirley Temple.

=== 1974–1975: Living in the 70's ===
For Skyhooks, the replacement of Hill by Strachan was a pivotal moment, as Strachan had remarkable vocal skills, and a magnetic stage and screen presence. Alongside Macainsh's lyrics, another facet of the group was the twin-guitar sound of Starkie and Symons. Adopting elements of glam rock in their presentation, and lyrics that presented frank depictions of the social life of young Australia in the 1970s, the band shocked conservative middle Australia with their outrageous (for the time) costumes, make-up, lyrics, and on-stage activities. A 1.2-metre (4 ft) high mushroom-shaped phallus was confiscated by Adelaide police after a performance. Six of the ten tracks on their debut album, Living in the 70's, were banned by the Federation of Australian Commercial Broadcasters for their sex and drug references: "Toorak Cowboy", "Whatever Happened to the Revolution?", "You Just Like Me Cos I'm Good in Bed", "Hey What's the Matter", "Motorcycle Bitch" and "Smut". Much of the group's success derived from its distinctive repertoire, mostly penned by bass guitarist Macainsh, with an occasional additional song from Symons—who wrote "Smut" and performed its lead vocals. Although Skyhooks were not the first Australian rock band to write songs in a local setting—rather than ditties about love or songs about New York City or other foreign lands—they were the first to become commercially successful doing so. Skyhooks songs addressed teenage issues including buying drugs ("Carlton (Lygon Street Limbo)"), suburban sex ("Balwyn Calling"), the gay scene ("Toorak Cowboy") and loss of girlfriends ("Somewhere in Sydney") by namechecking Australian locales. Radio personality, Billy Pinnell described the importance of their lyrics in tackling Australia's cultural cringe:

[Macainsh] broke down all the barriers [...] opening the door for Australian rock 'n' roll songwriters to write about local places and events. He legitimised Australian songwriting and it meant that Australians became themselves.

— Billy Pinnell, quoted in Molly Meldrum presents 50 years of rock in Australia p. 104

The first Skyhooks single, "Living in the 70's", was released in August 1974, ahead of the album, and peaked at No. 28 on the Australian Kent Music Report Singles Charts. The album, Living in the 70's initially charted only in Melbourne upon its release on 7 October 1974. It went on to spend 16 weeks at the top of the Australian Kent Music Report Albums Charts from February to June 1975. The album was produced by Wilson, and became the best selling Australian album, to that time, with 226,000 copies sold in Australia.

Skyhooks returned to the Sunbury Pop Festival in January 1975. They were declared the best performers by Rolling Stone Australia and The Age reviewers, and Gudinski now took over their management. The second single, "Horror Movie", reached No. 1 for two weeks in March. The band's success was credited by Gudinski with saving his struggling Mushroom Records and enabled it to develop into the most successful Australian label of its time.

The success of the album was also due to support by a new pop music television show Countdown on national public broadcaster ABC Television, rather than promotion by commercial radio. "Horror Movie" was the first song played on the first colour transmission of Countdown in early 1975. Despite the radio ban, the ABC's newly established 24-hour rock music station Double Jay chose the album's fifth track, the provocatively titled "You Just Like Me Cos I'm Good in Bed", as its first ever broadcast on 19 January.

=== 1975–1976: Ego Is Not a Dirty Word ===
Skyhooks' 1975 national tour promoting Living in the 70's finished at Melbourne's Festival Hall with their ANZAC Day (25 April) performance. They were supported by comedy singer Bob Hudson, heavy rockers AC/DC and New Zealand band Split Enz. Strachan then took two weeks off and considered leaving the band, but he returned – newly married – and they continued recording the follow-up album, Ego Is Not a Dirty Word. Initially, they were locked out of the recording studio until their manager, Gudinski, sent down the money still owed for recording the first album. Ego Is Not a Dirty Word spent 11 weeks at the top of the Australian album chart from 21 July 1975, and sold 210,000 copies. with the single, "Ego Is Not a Dirty Word" issued in April ahead of the album, peaking at No. 2. The next single, "All My Friends Are Getting Married" reached No. 2 in July, and was followed by "Million Dollar Riff" at No. 6 in October. Macainsh's then girlfriend, Jenny Brown, described the band in her 1975 book, Skyhooks : Million Dollar Riff. A live version of Chuck Berry's "Let It Rock" from a December performance was released as a single in March 1976 and reached No. 26.

With Australian commercial success achieved, Skyhooks turned to the US market. Gudinski announced a $1.5 million deal with Mercury Records/Phonogram Records, which released a modified international version of Ego Is Not a Dirty Word with "Horror Movie" and "You Just Like Me Cos I'm Good in Bed" from their first Australian album replacing two tracks. A US tour followed in March–April 1976, but critics described them as imitators of Kiss due to the similarity of Symons' make-up and stage act to that of Gene Simmons, and despite limited success in Boston, Massachusetts and Jacksonville, Florida they failed to make inroads into the general US market.

After completing their 1976 US tour, the band remained in San Francisco and recorded their third album with Wilson producing, Straight in a Gay Gay World, which was released in August 1976 and peaked at No. 3 on the Australian album charts. In July, upon return to Australia they launched The Brats Are Back Tour with a single, "This Is My City", which peaked at number 32. "Blue Jeans" followed in August and peaked at No. 12 on the singles chart. By October, Strachan provided his debut solo single, "Every Little Bit Hurts" (a cover of Brenda Holloway's 1964 hit).

=== 1977–1981: Later years to break-up ===
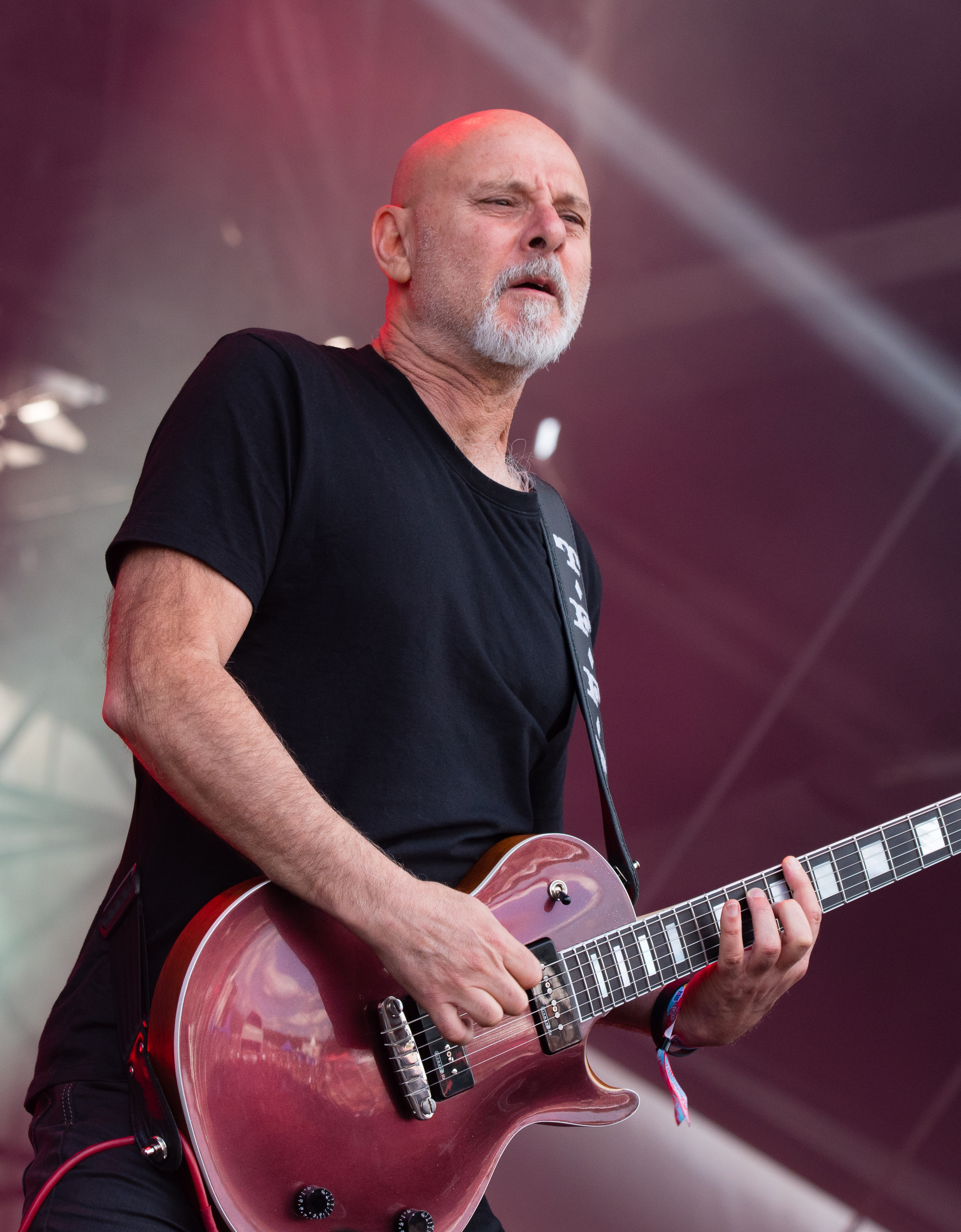
Symons' replacement Bob Spencer joined in early 1977 (1977–1980, pictured in 2018)

In February 1977, Symons left the band and was replaced on guitar by Bob Spencer from the band Finch. With Symons' departure the band dropped the glam rock look and used a more straight forward hard rock approach. During that year Skyhooks toured nationally three times, while their first single with Spencer, "Party to End All Parties", entered the top 30 in May. Strachan released his second solo single, a cover of Smokey Robinson's "Tracks of My Tears", which reached the top 20 in July. Meanwhile, Mushroom released a singles anthology, The Skyhooks Tapes, which entered the top 50 in September. The band's mass popularity had declined although they still kept their live performances exciting and irreverent.

In January 1978 they toured New Zealand and performed at the Nambassa festival. In February their next single, "Women in Uniform", was issued and peaked at No. 8, while its album Guilty Until Proven Insane followed in March and reached No. 7. The album was produced by Americans Eddie Leonetti and Jack Douglas. The second single from the album, "Meglomania" released in May, peaked at number 93. Strachan told band members he intended to leave—but it was not officially announced for six months—he continued regular shows until his final gig with Skyhooks on 29 July 1978. Strachan released further solo singles, "Mr Summer" in October and "Nothing but the Best" in January 1979, but neither charted in the top 50. Strachan's replacement in Skyhooks, on lead vocals, was Tony Williams (ex-Reuben Tice with Macainsh).

Williams' first single for Skyhooks, "Over the Border", a political song about the state of the Queensland Police Force at the time, reached the top 40 in April 1979, and their fifth studio album, Hot for the Orient, was released in May 1980, but failed to enter the top 50.

From 1975 to 1977, Skyhooks were—alongside Sherbet—the most commercially successful group in Australia, but over the next few years, Skyhooks rapidly faded from the public eye with the departure of key members, and in 1980 the band announced its break-up in controversial circumstances. Ian "Molly" Meldrum, usually a supporter of Skyhooks, savaged Hot for the Orient on his "Humdrum" segment of Countdown—viewers demanded that the band appear on a following show to defend it. Poor reception of the album both by the public and reviewers led the band to take out a page-sized ad in the local music press declaring "Why Don't You All Get Fu**ed" (title of one of their songs) and they played their last performance on 8 June, not in their hometown of Melbourne, but in the mining town of Kalgoorlie in Western Australia.

=== 1982–1999: Reformations and later releases ===
In December 1982, Mushroom released a medley of Skyhooks songs as "Hooked on Hooks" which peaked at No. 21. Demands for the "classic" line-up of the band—Macainsh, Bob Starkie, Strachan, Strauks and Symons—to reform were successful and on 23 April 1983, they started the Living in the 80's Tour. Support acts for the first concert included The Church, Mental as Anything, The Party Boys, The Sunnyboys, and Midnight Oil—who acknowledged, "Hooks were the only Australian band they would let top the bill above them". This tour was released on LP as Live in the 80's.

A one-off reunion concert took place in October 1984, and in 1990 the band finally recorded new material, including "Jukebox in Siberia", released in September, which peaked at the top of the ARIA Singles Charts for two weeks. In November, The Latest and Greatest, a compilation album, was released, which peaked at No. 4 on the ARIA Albums Charts. The tracks were taken from Skyhooks' first four studio albums along with two recent singles, "Jukebox In Siberia" and the uncharted "Tall Timber".

In 1992, Skyhooks were inducted into the Australian Recording Industry Association (ARIA) Hall of Fame, while their manager, Gudinski, and record label, Mushroom Records, received a 'Special Achievement Award'. Producer of their first three albums, Wilson, had been inducted into the Hall of Fame in 1989 as an individual and again as a member of Daddy Cool in 2006.

The final release of new Skyhooks material came in June 1999 when a twin-CD, Skyhooks: The Collection, was issued. Disc one contained a greatest hits package, very similar to "The Latest and Greatest", with additional tracks. Disc two is referred to by fans as "The Lost Album", with previously unreleased songs from their 1990 and 1994 recording sessions.

=== After Skyhooks ===
Strachan and Symons each went on to successful careers in Australian media including radio and television. Symons worked as a breakfast presenter on ABC radio and wrote humorous newspaper columns after being on the TV show Hey Hey It's Saturday as a house band member and judge of the Red Faces segment. Starkie played locally with different bands including Ol' Skydaddys, and Ram Band. Strauks was drummer for Melbourne rock band The Sports, Jo Jo Zep & The Falcons, folk band The Bushwackers and the Ol' Skydaddys. Macainsh played with John Farnham on his Whispering Jack Tour and with Dave Warner's from the Suburbs, in 1988 he put together and managed a successful AC/DC tribute band called Back in Black who went on to support Skyhooks on their comeback tour. He was a board member of Australasian Performing Right Association (APRA) (1997–2000) and Phonographic Performance Company of Australia (PPCA) (2001–2006), and is an intellectual property lawyer.

Strachan was killed in an air crash on 29 August 2001, when the helicopter he was learning to fly solo crashed into Mount Archer near Kilcoy, northwest of Brisbane. A memorial concert was held on 11 September 2001 at the Palais Theatre, tributes were paid and some remaining members—Strauks, Macainsh, Starkie, Symons and Spencer—performed with guest vocalists Daryl Braithwaite and Wilson. It is the only time Symons and his replacement, Spencer performed together on stage. Braithwaite performed "All My Friends Are Getting Married" with the band while Wilson sang the rare Skyhooks track "Warm Wind in the City".

The 30th anniversary of the release of the Living in the 70's album was commemorated in 2004, with different incarnations of the band performing. Absent were Strachan, Hill and Inglis. Vocals were performed by Wilson, Williams and Bob Starkie. The original line-up of Skyhooks, including Hill, reformed in 2005 at the Annandale Hotel in Sydney for a one-off gig, a benefit for Hill, who had been diagnosed with liver cancer. The line-up of Inglis, Peter Starkie, Strauks and Macainsh joined him onstage. Hill died six weeks later. In November 2009, the "Skyhooks Tour Archive", displayed on the band's website, listed 925 live shows.

Macainsh, Starkie and Strauks appeared as Skyhooks at the 2009 Helpmann Awards in Sydney. They performed "Women in Uniform" with Australian rock singer, Jimmy Barnes. Symons was also slated to perform with the band, but was replaced by Diesel on guitar after withdrawing a few days before the show.

Original guitarist Peter Starkie died of complications after a fall, in mid-September 2020, at the age of 72. Guitarist Bob Starkie died from leukaemia on 29 November 2025, at the age of 73.

== Members ==
Classic lineup

- Greg Macainsh – bass, backing vocals (1973–1980, 1983, 1984, 1990, 1994)
- Imants Alfred "Freddie" Strauks (aka "Freddie Kaboodleschnitzer") – drums, backing vocals, percussion (1973–1980, 1983, 1984, 1990, 1994)
- Bob Starkie (aka "Bongo Starr") – guitar, backing and lead vocals (1973–1980, 1983, 1984, 1990, 1994; died 2025)
- Red Symons – guitar, backing and lead vocals, keyboards (1973–1977, 1983, 1984, 1990, 1994)
- Graeme "Shirley" Strachan – lead vocals (1974–1978, 1983, 1984, 1990, 1994; died 2001)

Other members

- Steve Hill – lead vocals (1973–1974; died 2005)
- Peter Inglis – guitar (1973)
- Peter Starkie – guitar, backing vocals (1973; died 2020)
- Bob Spencer – guitar, backing vocals (1977–1980)
- Tony Williams – lead vocals (1978–1980)

== Discography ==
=== Studio albums ===
Year	Title	Peak chart positions	Certifications/Sales (sales thresholds)
Year	Title	AUS KMR	Certifications/Sales (sales thresholds)
1974	Living in the 70's: Label: Mushroom Records (T35299)	1	AUS: 4× Platinum (200,000+)
1975	Ego Is Not a Dirty Word: Label: Mushroom Records (T35575)	1	AUS: 250,000
1976	Straight in a Gay Gay World: Label: Mushroom Records (T35982)	3	AUS: Platinum (100,000)
1978	Guilty Until Proven Insane: Label: Mushroom Records	6	
1980	Hot for the Orient: Label: Mushroom Records	64	

=== Compilation albums ===
Year	Title	Peak chart positions	Certifications/Sales (sales thresholds)
Year	Title	AUS KMR ARIA	Certifications/Sales (sales thresholds)
1977	The Skyhooks Tapes: Label: Mushroom Records (L36288)	49	
1979	The Best of Skyhooks: Label: Mushroom Records (L37094)	9	
1990	The Latest and Greatest: Label: Mushroom Records (93339)	4	AUS: Platinum (70,000)
1994	Singles and B sides: Label: Mushroom Records (D80984)	—	
1999	The Lost Album: Label: Mushroom Records (MUSH33153.2)	36	
2015	Hits'n'Riffs: Label: Festival Records / Warner Music Australia (FEST601043)	32	
"—" denotes releases that did not chart or were not released in that country.

=== Video albums ===
Year	Title	Peak chart positions	Certifications
Year	Title	AUS DVD	Certifications
2002	Right There on Your DVD: Label: Mushroom Records (335818)	25	ARIA: Gold

=== Live albums ===
Year	Title	Peak chart positions
Year	Title	AUS KMR
1978	Live! Be in It: Label: Mushroom Records	84
1983	Live in the 80's: Label: Mushroom Records	19

=== Box sets ===
Year	Title	Peak chart positions
Year	Title	AUS ARIA
1982	The Skyhooks Box: 9 record box set: Eight LPs and one 12" single ("Hooked on 'Hooks")	—
1982	Bonus Album No. 1, Singles and B Sides: Compilation of non-album tracks	—
1982	Bonus Album No. 2, Demos and Dialogue: Compilation of demo tracks	—
1982	Skyhooks Roadcase: 6-CD box set with booklet included	—
2015	Don't You Believe What You've Seen or You've Heard: 3-disc set, celebrating 40 years of Skyhooks	40
"—" denotes releases that did not chart or were not released in that country.

=== Singles ===
Year	Title	Peak chart positions			Album
Year	Title	AUS KMR ARIA	NZL RIANZ	UK	Album
1974	"Living in the 70's"	28	—	—	Living in the 70's
1975	"Horror Movie"	1	—	—	Living in the 70's
1975	"Ego Is Not a Dirty Word"	2	—	—	Ego Is Not a Dirty Word
1975	"All My Friends Are Getting Married"	2	—	—	Ego Is Not a Dirty Word
1975	"Million Dollar Riff"	6	—	—	Straight in a Gay Gay World
1976	"Let It Rock" (live version)	26	—	—	Non-album single
1976	"This Is My City"	32	—	—	Straight in a Gay Gay World
1976	"Blue Jeans"	12	3	—	Straight in a Gay Gay World
1977	"Party to End All Parties"	24	—	—	The Skyhooks Tapes
1978	"Women in Uniform"	8	—	73	Guilty Until Proven Insane
1978	"Meglomania"	93	—	—	Guilty Until Proven Insane
1979	"Over the Border"	32	—	—	Hot for the Orient
1980	"This Town Is Boring"	—	—	—	Hot for the Orient
1980	"Keep the Junk in America"	—	—	—	Hot for the Orient
1982	"Hooked on Hooks"	21	—	—	Non-album single
1990	"Jukebox in Siberia"	1	32	—	The Latest and Greatest
1990	"Tall Timber"	66	—	—	The Latest and Greatest
1994	"Happy Hippy Hut" / "The Ballad of Oz" (by Daddy Cool)	35	—	—	The Lost Album
"—" denotes a recording that did not chart or was not released in that territory.

== Awards and nominations ==
=== ARIA Music Awards ===
The ARIA Music Awards is an annual awards ceremony that recognises excellence, innovation, and achievement across all genres of Australian music. They commenced in 1987. Skyhooks inducted into the Hall of Fame in 2005.

Year	Nominee / work	Award	Result
1992	Skyhooks	ARIA Hall of Fame	inductee

=== Australian Record Awards ===
Year	Nominee / work	Award	Result
1975	Ego Is Not a Dirty Word	Group Album of the Year	Won

=== King of Pop Awards ===
The King of Pop Awards were voted by the readers of TV Week. The King of Pop award started in 1967 and ran through to 1978.

Year	Nominee / work	Award	Result
1975	"Horror Movie"	Australian Record of the Year	Won
1975	Ego is not a Dirty Word	Most Popular Australian Album	Won
1975	Greg Macainsh (Skyhooks)	Best Australian Songwriter	Won
1976	Straight in a Gay Gay World	Best Cover Design	Won
1978	"Hotel Hell" by Skyhooks on Nightmoves	Best Australian TV Performer	Won

- Note: wins only

== See also ==
- Sherbet
