= Shirley Strachan =

Australian singer (1952–2001)

Graeme "Shirley" Strachan
- Born: Graeme Ronald Strachan; 2 January 1952; Malvern, Victoria, Australia
- Died: 29 August 2001 (aged 49) Mount Archer, Queensland, Australia
- Genres: Rock and roll, progressive rock, pop, glam rock
- Occupations: Singer; songwriter; television presenter; radio presenter; carpenter
- Instruments: Vocals, tambourine
- Years active: 1971–2001
- Label: Mushroom/Festival

Graeme Ronald Strachan (pronounced "Strawn") (2 January 1952 – 29 August 2001), professionally billed and known as "Shirley" Strachan or Shirl, was an Australian singer, songwriter, radio and television presenter, and carpenter. He was the lead singer of the rock group Skyhooks (1974–1978, 1983, 1984, 1990, 1994). While still a member of Skyhooks, he had solo singles, which charted on the Kent Music Report, with a cover recording of Brenda Holloway's "Every Little Bit Hurts" (October 1976, No. 3) and a remake of The Miracles "Tracks of My Tears" (July 1977, top 20). After leaving Skyhooks in July 1978, he concentrated on his solo career. He was the host of children's TV program Shirl's Neighbourhood (1979–83). From 1993, he appeared on home renovation TV program Our House as a carpenter and co-host. At the ARIA Music Awards of 1993, Skyhooks were inducted into the ARIA Hall of Fame. Strachan died in August 2001 in a self-piloted helicopter accident.

== Biography ==
=== Early years ===
Strachan born in Malvern, Victoria, on 2 January 1952 and grew up in Mount Waverley. He was the older brother of three sisters, and he was the son of Joyce and Ronald Strachan, who was a carpenter and former World War II Navy sailor. Strachan became an avid surfer, and his nickname "Shirley" was applied by fellow surfers due to his long, sunbleached and curly hair (referring to Shirley Temple). He was educated at Mount Waverley High School to the end of year 10, where he completed an apprenticeship as a carpenter.

Strachan was a well-known supporter of the Hawthorn Football Club in the AFL.

=== Music career and Skyhooks ===
Strachan met Freddy Strauks, a drummer, at a performance at Village Green. Strachan would later drive his friend to gigs. Strauks and Greg Macainsh, on bass guitar, were members of Claptrap in 1970, and they asked Strachan to join on lead vocals in the following year. The group were renamed Frame with Strachan; Strauks and Macainsh were joined by Pat O'Brien and Sintjio Oohms, both on guitars. The group's debut performance was on 19 April 1971 at Eltham's Montsalvat, where Strachan "stood facing the band, too shy to face the audience".

In November 1972, Strachan left Frame and moved to Phillip Island to take up surfing and part-time carpentry. He later recalled, "You'd get up in the morning and look out the window and say 'yeah'. Then you'd go down to Woolamai [beach] and check it out. There'd be a few bars there, and you'd go surfing. Then you'd have lunch and perhaps a couple of hours' work, and then it's high tide, so you go surfing again." While Strachan was surfing at Philip Island, Macainsh and Strauks formed a new band, Skyhooks, in March 1973 with Steve Hill on lead vocals (ex-Lillee), Peter Inglis on guitar (ex–Captain Matchbox Whoopee Band) and Peter Starkie on guitar and vocals (ex–Lipp & the Double Decker Brothers). In March 1974, Strachan replaced Hill on lead vocals in Skyhooks alongside Macainsh, Strauks and Bob "Bongo" Starkie (ex–Mary Jane Union) and Red Symons (ex-Scumbag), both on guitars.

Australian musicologist Ian McFarlane described Strachan as "a natural frontman: young and gifted, loudmouthed and witty, blessed with a sweet yet powerful voice and androgynous good looks". Ed Nimmervoll, a music journalist, opined that "Not only did he have a new identity, he took his singing role on with new maturity and attitude. [Macainsh] told him he'd need to work the stage, and 'Shirl' never looked back, roaming the stage like a maniac." In December 1975, they toured nationally, which Strachan declared was "the biggest tour ever undertaken by an Australian group. Every concert will be performed in the open air". The group followed with a tour of the United States with some performances as a support act to Uriah Heep.

Strachan started his solo singing career during his time with Skyhooks. In October 1976, he issued a cover version of Brenda Holloway's 1964 hit "Every Little Bit Hurts" as his debut single, which peaked at No. 3 on the Kent Music Report Singles Chart. It was produced by Warren Morgan, engineered by Ross Cockle and recorded at Armstrong Studios on Mushroom Records/Festival Records. The B-side, "Cruisin' Out on You", was co-written by Strachan with Morgan.

His follow-up single, "Tracks of My Tears", a cover of Smokey Robinson and the Miracles' 1965 hit, reached No. 18 in July 1977. It was produced by Ric Formosa, engineered by Cockle, and recorded at Armstrongs. The B-side, "Missing You", was co-written by Strachan and Bob Spencer (Skyhooks' then-current guitarist). According to Nimmervoll, "Skyhooks in the meantime had started to struggle, and not one to do something he wasn't enjoying any more, Shirl left. It didn't mean that much to him." In July 1978 Strachan left Skyhooks, but his departure was not announced until the following January. He was replaced on lead vocals by Tony Williams of Reuben Tice. During 1978, he issued his third solo single, "Mr Summer", which did not chart.

=== Post-Skyhooks and Shirl's Neighbourhood ===
After Skyhooks, Strachan worked as a radio and television presenter. He became known to a new generation as the host of a magazine-style children's TV series, Shirl's Neighbourhood, from 1979 to 1983. He issued his debut solo album, It's all Rock 'n' Roll to Me, in 1980. At the Logie Awards of 1983, Shirl's Neighbourhood won Best Children's TV Series. He organised and participated in several Skyhooks reformations during the 1980s and 1990s.

=== Party Boys, radio, Our House and Skyhooks reunions ===
In 1984, Strachan joined a rock supergroup, the Party Boys, for a national tour and was recorded on lead vocals for their third live album, No Song Too Sacred, alongside founding members Graham Bidstrup on drums, Kevin Borich on guitar and Paul Christie on bass guitar, and new guitarist, Robin Riley (ex-Rose Tattoo). The album provided their cover version of Led Zeppelin's "Kashmir" as a single.

At the ARIA Music Awards of 1993 in March, Skyhooks were inducted into the ARIA Hall of Fame. Strachan relocated to Queensland in that year and started as a regular presenter on home makeover program, Our House, where he resurrected skills from his pre-Skyhooks carpentry trade. He also presented a breakfast radio show, with Dean Miller and rugby league international Gary Belcher, on the radio station Triple M Brisbane in the 1990s. Strachan left Triple M in 1997 following a pay dispute. He died in August 2001 while solo-piloting a helicopter, aged 49.

A biography of Strachan, Shirl: The Life of Legendary Larrikin Graeme 'Shirley' Strachan, written by Jeff Apter, appeared in 2012. Apter had already written 15 celebrity biographies; for Shirl, Apter had access to Skyhooks' band members, Strachan's family, and "music industry figures, people from Strachan's later career in TV and radio, and the surfing gang he assembled after relocating to Queensland in the 90s." Alistair Jones of The Australian felt that Apter's sources "all contribute to a picture of a good bloke fondly remembered" with the biography's strength being the "input that keeps the journey of a larger-than-life character grounded in personal terms" while a "down-side" was that "in sympathetically honouring the trust of his sources, Shirl becomes something of a tear-jerker."

== Personal life ==
In August 1975, Strachan married Sandra Davis at a registry office in London. The pair had started dating when he was surfing and working on Phillip Island in 1972–73. By October 1977, the couple had separated. Strachan's second wife was Sue Scott. The couple met in 1981 when he was a guest of the TV game show Catch Us If You Can, where Scott was a model and presenter. In 1993, the Strachans moved to Queensland.

=== Death ===
Strachan was killed in a helicopter crash on 29 August 2001, at the age of 49. He had been a fixed-wing pilot for many years and had been undergoing training for a helicopter pilot's licence, with a view to buying a helicopter and taking friends and family on surfing safaris. On a solo flight near Mount Archer, Queensland, in clear but (significantly) very windy weather and inexplicably off the course planned by his instructor, Strachan encountered mountain turbulence which caused the rotor of his Bell 47G to sever the tailboom, crashing the helicopter onto the north-north-eastern slope of Mount Archer. The day Strachan died was, coincidentally, the day an ABC documentary episode on rock and roll in Australia, Long Way to the Top, which referred to the Skyhooks, aired on TV.

=== Tributes ===
In early September 2001, a beachside funeral was attended by Strachan's family and friends, including Skyhooks' guitarist, Red Symons, and radio colleagues, Gary Belcher and Dean Miller. His ashes were scattered into the sea from a helicopter by his wife, Sue.

Triple M Brisbane, Strachan's former employer, held a day-long on-air tribute to him on the day after his death. Old archived audio was played on air. An episode of the Australian Broadcasting Corporation documentary Long Way to the Top featuring Skyhooks was broadcast on the day of his death: it was dedicated to his memory. On 10 September, Channel Nine broadcast a tribute episode of Our House, "Our House – Memories of Shirl", with content filmed in the weeks before his death, along with archival footage. It was the most-watched program on that night, with 2.19 million viewers.

In September 2001, remaining members of Skyhooks reunited for a memorial gig at the Palais Theatre, St Kilda. Guest vocalists included Daryl Braithwaite on "All My Friends Are Getting Married" and Ross Wilson on "Warm Wind in the City".

=== Shirley Strachan Memorial Swim ===
The Noosa Heads Surf Lifesaving Club has been holding a competitive surf swim commemorating Shirley Strachan since 2002 – the Annual Shirley Strachan Memorial Swim. It was originally organised by Bruce and Sandy Warren. In November 2016, Bruce Warren died, and subsequent swims have been re-named the Shirley Strachan and Bruce Warren Memorial Swim.

== Discography ==
=== Studio albums ===
List of albums, with Australian chart positions
Title	Album details	Peak chart positions
Title	Album details	AUS
It's All Rock 'n Roll to Me (as Shirl)	Released: 1980; Format: LP, Cassette; Label: Hammard (HAM054)	68

=== Singles ===
List of singles, with Australian chart positions
Year	Title	Peak chart positions
Year	Title	AUS
1976	"Every Little Bit Hurts"	2
1977	"Tracks of My Tears"	20
1978	"Mr Summer"	–
1979	"Nothing but the Best"	–
1979	"Christmas in the Neighbourhood"	–

=== Other singles ===
List of singles as featured artist, with selected chart positions
Title	Year
"Rock Around the Clock" (released to commemorate the 21st Anniversary of the release of "Rock Around the Clock") (with Glenn Shorrock, Frankie J. Holden, John Paul Young, Daryl Braithwaite and Renée Geyer)	1977
