= Women in Uniform =

1978 single by Skyhooks

Single by Skyhooks

from the album Guilty Until Proven Insane
- B-side: "Don't Take Yur Lurex to the Laundromat"; "Do the Hook"
- Released: February 1978
- Recorded: 1978
- Genre: Glam rock
- Length: 4:21
- Label: Mushroom Records
- Songwriter: Greg Macainsh
- Producer: Eddie Leonetti

Skyhooks singles chronology
"Party to End All Parties" (1977)	"Women in Uniform" (1978)	"Megalomania" (1978)

"Women in Uniform" is a 1978 song by the Australian band Skyhooks; it was written by the band's bass guitar player, Greg Macainsh. It was released in February 1978 as the lead single from their fourth studio album, Guilty Until Proven Insane and peaked at number 8 in Australia and number 73 in the UK.

== Reception ==
Sounds said, "Australian pre-New Wavers try to stay up to date and succeed far enough. So far, so neat, but the beat is matched only by the girl(?) vocalist and not by any traces of lyrical/tuneful dexterity." Rip It Up claimed the song benefited from the "hard rock" production from new producer Leonetti and, "would almost certainly have been a hit single if radio-land could have heard it through 18-inch speakers." The Sydney Morning Herald described it as, "a number which has already made an impact as a twelve-inch single. It's a good lyric. Perhaps it is a prophetic comment on woman-power."

== Track listings ==
Australian 7" single (K-7062)/ 12" single (X 11810)

Side one
No.	Title	Writer(s)	Length
1.	"Women in Uniform"	Greg Macainsh	4:21

Side two
No.	Title	Length
1.	"Don't Take Yur Lurex to the Laundromat"	3:19
2.	"Do The Hook"	2:17

United Kingdom 7" single (United Artists Records – UP 36508)

Side one
No.	Title	Writer(s)	Length
1.	"Women in Uniform"	Greg Macainsh	4:21

Side two
No.	Title	Length
1.	"BBBBBoogie"	3:21

== Charts ==
=== Weekly charts ===
Weekly chart performance for "Women in Uniform"
Chart (1978)	Peak position
Australia (Kent Music Report)	8
UK Singles Chart	73

=== Year-end charts ===
Year-end chart performance for "Women in Uniform"
Chart (1978)	Position
Australia (Kent Music Report)	59

== Iron Maiden version ==
"Women in Uniform"

Single by Iron Maiden
- B-side: "Invasion"; "Phantom of the Opera" (live); "Drifter" (live)
- Released: 27 October 1980
- Recorded: 1980
- Genre: Heavy metal
- Length: 3:08
- Label: EMI
- Songwriter: Greg Macainsh
- Producer: Tony Platt

Iron Maiden singles chronology
"Sanctuary" (1980)	"Women in Uniform" (1980)	"Twilight Zone" / "Wrathchild" (1981)

Iron Maiden's cover version of the song was the band's third single and their last recorded work with the guitarist Dennis Stratton. It was released on 27 October 1980 in order to promote the second British leg of their Iron Maiden Tour. The song was also included on the Australian edition of their second album, Killers, as it was originally a number eight hit in Australia for Skyhooks in 1978. In 1990, the 12" version was reissued on CD and 12" vinyl as part of The First Ten Years box set, in which it was combined with their following single, "Twilight Zone".

The idea to cover the song was suggested by the band's publishing company, Zomba, who arranged studio time at Battery Studios with AC/DC producer Tony Platt. Although sceptical at first about recording a song that was so different from the band's style, the bass guitarist, Steve Harris, conceded when Platt was hired, surmising that "as he worked with AC/DC and that, I thought, 'Oh, you know, fine. He's not gonna pull us in any commercial direction.'" After trying to create their own "heavy" version of the song, to Harris' dismay he found out that Platt, with help from Stratton, had been tampering with the song's mix as he had been briefed by Zomba to "try and get a hit single". As a result, Platt was dismissed and Harris remixed the track himself.

Although the intended mix was restored, the band has routinely mentioned their dislike of the single, with Harris vowing "never, ever, ever to allow anyone outside to fuck around with our music again". As a result, its only appearance on CD is as part of The First Ten Years series and a rare 1995 2CD issue of Killers, meaning that the song does not appear remastered. However, its B-Side, "Invasion", appears remastered on the Best of the 'B' Sides compilation.

"Women in Uniform" was also the basis of the band's first music-video, directed by Brian Grant and filmed at the Rainbow Theatre. Considered an unusual project for a band to undertake in the years before MTV, the filming was Stratton's last contribution for the band.

The single's cover has an image of Margaret Thatcher with a Sterling submachine gun, preparing to ambush the group's mascot, Eddie, as he walks the streets with two young women. According to the band, the cover was a joke which was meant to ask whether her motive was through jealousy or revenge (following the infamous "Sanctuary" artwork that showed Eddie killing Thatcher), which managed to cause further controversy as, according to the Liverpool Daily Post, a group of "screaming, chanting, banner-carrying feminists" led a demonstration during Iron Maiden's show at Leeds University on 22 November 1980.

The song is one of only five Iron Maiden songs to fade out, the others being "Stranger in a Strange Land" from Somewhere in Time, "The Prophecy" from Seventh Son of a Seventh Son, "Hell on Earth" from Senjutsu, and "Kill Me Ce Soir", a cover version of a Golden Earring song that was released as the B-side to the "Holy Smoke" single in 1990. The German 12" release of the single included a live version of "Drifter" (from the "Sanctuary" single) instead of "Invasion" and had a different cover, a cropped version of the band's Iron Maiden album artwork.

=== Track listing ===
7" single

Side one
No.	Title	Writer(s)	Length
1.	"Women in Uniform" (Skyhooks cover)	Greg Macainsh	3:08

Side two
No.	Title	Writer(s)	Length
2.	"Invasion"	Steve Harris	2:38

12" single

Side one
No.	Title	Writer(s)	Length
1.	"Women in Uniform" (Skyhooks cover)	Macainsh	3:08

Side two
No.	Title	Writer(s)	Length
2.	"Invasion"	Harris	2:38
3.	"Phantom of the Opera" (Live at the Marquee, London, England, 4 July 1980)	Harris	7:12

German 12" single

Side one
No.	Title	Writer(s)	Length
1.	"Women in Uniform" (Skyhooks cover)	Macainsh	3:08

Side two
No.	Title	Writer(s)	Length
2.	"Drifter" (Live at the Marquee, London, England, 3 April 1980)	Harris	6:00
3.	"Phantom of the Opera" (Live at the Marquee, London, England, 4 July 1980)	Harris	7:12

=== Personnel ===
- Paul Di'Anno – vocals
- Dave Murray – guitar
- Dennis Stratton – guitar, backing vocals
- Steve Harris – bass guitar, backing vocals
- Clive Burr – drums

=== Charts ===
Women in Uniform

Chart (1980)	Peak position
UK Singles (Official Charts)	35

Women in Uniform/Twilight Zone

Chart (1990)	Peak position
UK Singles (Official Charts)	10

== Other cover versions ==
- The Whitlams performed this song at the 1998 ARIA Awards and released a limited edition single the following year, which also included "High Ground" and "1999".
- Paul Di'Anno - who sang for Iron Maiden when they recorded their version - recorded a version for his album, The Classics - The Maiden Years, in 2006.
