= Living in the 70's =

Australian rock music album from 1974

Studio album by Skyhooks
- Released: 28 October 1974
- Recorded: June–July 1974
- Studios: TCS, Melbourne
- Genres: Rock, glam rock
- Length: 38:48
- Label: Mushroom
- Producer: Ross Wilson

Skyhooks chronology
Living in the 70's (1974)	Ego Is Not a Dirty Word (1975)

Singles from Living in the 70's
- 1. "Livin' in the 70's" Released: August 1974; 2. "Horror Movie" Released: December 1974

Living in the 70's is the debut album by Australian rock band Skyhooks, which was released in October 1974 via Mushroom Records. It spent 16 weeks at the top of the national albums chart from late February 1975, and became the highest-selling album by an Australian artist in the country, eventually achieving shipment of 375,000 copies. The second single, "Horror Movie" (1974), reached number one on the related national singles chart in 1975. In October 2010, it was listed at No. 9 in the book 100 Best Australian Albums. The album's eponymous track was ranked number 72 in 2018 on Triple M's "Ozzest 100", the "most Australian" songs of all time listing.

== Background ==
Living in the 70's was recorded by the Melbourne-based rock band Skyhooks in June–July 1974 at the local TCS studios. The line up was Greg Macainsh on bass guitar and backing vocals, Bob "Bongo" Starkie on guitar and backing vocals, Graham "Shirley" Strachan on lead vocals, Imants "Freddie" Strauks on drums, backing vocals and percussion, and Red Symons on guitar, backing vocals and mandolin. The group had formed in March 1973 with only Macainsh and Strauks the remaining founders members. Ross Wilson (ex-Daddy Cool) saw an early performance and signed main songwriter, Macainish to a publishing contract. Wilson recommended the group to Mushroom Records owner Michael Gudinski.

Living in the 70's is the first album Wilson produced, "I knew that if they got some guy from a large record company they'd try to water down the songs". Macainsh recalled, "We didn't know what to expect and to what extent we'd have to do things over and over. [Wilson] was a tough producer, but he knew what he wanted. The way we recorded it was pretty much the band playing live. We'd been playing those songs live for a while, and that's what we were aiming to get." It was released via Mushroom on 28 October 1974. The artwork (external front and back, and internal gatefold) was painted by Niels Hutchison.

Two singles were issued from the album. Lead single "Livin' in the 70's" (August 1974), peaked at No. 28 on the Kent Music Report singles chart. It was backed by a non-LP track, "You're a Broken Gin Bottle, Baby", which appeared as track 11 on the 2004 CD remastered version of the album. The second single, "Horror Movie"/"Carlton (Lygon Street Limbo)" (December 1974) spent two weeks at the top of the Australian singles chart in 1975 from late March to early April. "Horror Movie" had been promoted on popular music show Countdown as the first song on its first colour episode on 1 March 1975. The group were "perfect for Countdown, with their colourful costumes and theatrical showmanship" and they "appeared many times to promote" the album.

Due to sex and/or drug references, six tracks were banned by Federation of Australian Commercial Broadcasters from Australian radio: "Toorak Cowboy", "Whatever Happened to the Revolution?", "You Just Like Me Cos I'm Good in Bed", "Hey What's the Matter", "Motorcycle Bitch" and "Smut". In defiance of this, however, the ABC's new youth radio station in Sydney, 2JJ, played "You Just Like Me 'Cos I'm Good in Bed" as its first ever song when it began broadcasting in January 1975.

== Reception ==
Professional ratings
Review scores
Source	Rating
AllMusic	3/5 stars

The Canberra Times' Tony Catterall generally praised Living in the 70's, "it's a concept album that really takes the 70s apart. It opens up a new phase in Australian rock, that of musician as social commentator, but not an impartial observer". However, Catterall was dissatisfied with two tracks, "Hey, What's the Matter?" and "Motorcycle Bitch", which were "album filler" and with Wilson's uneven production.

Australian musicologist Ian McFarlane observed, "[it] garnered instant critical acclaim and commercial success. Aside from the impact of the music itself and the wry social commentary of the lyrics, part of the album's success was down to the fact that the Federation of Australian Commercial Broadcasters banned from airplay six of the album's cuts. Middle-class Australia cried outrage at the use of such words as 'stoned', 'arse' and 'dope' in the songs. Macainsh's songs were the perfect reflection of the times, and the young record-buying public reacted positively."

In October 2010, it was listed at No. 9 in the book 100 Best Australian Albums. Its authors explained, "[it's] a unique fusion of glam, punk attitude... boogie-based rock and pop married with Macainsh's sharply observed and acerbic or explicit vignettes". In the following year it appeared at number 75 on the Triple J Hottest 100 Albums of All Time. In that same year, the album and title track were added to the National Film and Sound Archive (NFSA)'s Sounds of Australia registry. Curator, Tamara Osicka explained "[it] broke all previous sales records for an Australian album... [and] stayed in the top 100 for 54 weeks and became the best-selling album of 1975 in Australia". The title track was ranked number 72 as part of Triple M's "Ozzest 100", the "most Australian" songs of all time listing in 2018.

== Track listing ==
=== 1974 vinyl/cassette tape version ===
All tracks are written by Gregory J Macainsh, unless otherwise noted

Side A
No.	Title	Length
1.	"Livin' in the 70's"	3:42
2.	"Whatever Happened to the Revolution?"	4:08
3.	"Balwyn Calling"	3:44
4.	"Horror Movie"	3:47
5.	"You Just Like Me 'Cos I'm Good in Bed"	3:44

Side B
No.	Title	Length
1.	"Carlton (Lygon Street Limbo)"	3:56
2.	"Toorak Cowboy"	3:45
3.	"Smut" (Red Symons)	5:19
4.	"Hey, What's the Matter?"	2:47
5.	"Motorcycle Bitch"	3:56

=== 1984 CD version ===
All tracks are written by Gregory J Macainsh, unless otherwise noted

No.	Title	Length
1.	"Livin' in the 70's"	3:42
2.	"Whatever Happened to the Revolution?"	4:08
3.	"Balwyn Calling"	3:44
4.	"Horror Movie"	3:47
5.	"You Just Like Me 'Cos I'm Good in Bed"	3:44
6.	"Saturday Night" (live)	3:03
7.	"Carlton (Lygon Street Limbo)"	3:56
8.	"Toorak Cowboy"	3:45
9.	"Smut" (Red Symons)	5:19
10.	"Hey, What's the Matter?"	2:47
11.	"Motorcycle Bitch"	3:56
12.	"Why Don't You all Get" (live)	4:11

== Personnel ==
Skyhooks

- Graham "Shirley" Strachan – lead vocals (all but "Smut")
- Red Symons – guitar, backing vocals, lead vocals ("Smut"), mandolin
- Bob "Bongo" Starkie – guitar, backing vocals
- Greg Macainsh – bass guitar, backing vocals
- Imants Alfred "Freddie" Strauks – drums, backing vocals, percussion

Additional musicians

- Liam Bradley – vibraphone, marimba, xylophone
- Greg Sneddon – synthesiser
- Peter Sullivan – vibraphone, synthesiser
- Pat Wilson, Ross Willson – voices

Artisans

- Adai – photography
- John French – engineer
- Niels Hutchison – artwork
- Andrew Macainsh, Robert Gilbert – crew
- Ross Wilson – producer

== Charts ==
=== Weekly charts ===
Weekly chart performance for Living in the 70's
Chart (1974–1975)	Peak position
Australian Kent Music Report Albums Chart	1

=== Year-end charts ===
Year-end chart performance for Living in the 70's
Chart (1975)	Position
Australian Kent Music Report Albums Chart	1

== Certifications ==
Shipments of Living in the 70's
Region	Certification	Certified units/sales
Australia	—	475,000

== Release history ==
Release dates and formats for Living in the 70's
Region	Date	Format	Label	Catalogue No.
AUS	28 October 1974	LP / MC	Mushroom	L-35,299 / C-35,299
NZ	1975	LP	Interfusion	L35299
AUS	1984	LP	Mushroom	RML-53142
AUS	1984	CD	Mushroom	CD 53142
