= Let It Rock (Chuck Berry song) =

1960 rock and roll song by Chuck Berry

Single by Chuck Berry

from the album Rockin' at the Hops
- B-side: "Too Pooped to Pop" (Note: "Too Pooped to Pop" was subtitled "Casey" (in quotes) on the original single.)
- Released: 1960
- Recorded: July 1959
- Genre: Rock and roll
- Length: 2:28
- Label: Chess
- Songwriter: Chuck Berry (Note: The original Chess single listed the songwriter as "E. Anderson"; Berry's full name was "Charles Edward Anderson Berry".)
- Producers: Leonard Chess, Phil Chess

Chuck Berry singles chronology
"Broken Arrow" (1959)	"Let It Rock" (1960)	"Bye Bye Johnny" (1960)

"Let It Rock" is a song written and recorded by rock and roll pioneer Chuck Berry. Chess Records released it as single, which reached number 64 on the US Billboard Hot 100 chart in February 1960. Chess later added it to Berry's album Rockin' at the Hops (1960). In 1963, Pye Records released it as a single in the UK, where it reached number six.

"Let It Rock" was recorded by Berry on guitar and vocal, with long-time backing musicians Johnnie Johnson on piano, Willie Dixon on double bass, and Fred Below on drums.

In a song review for AllMusic, critic Matthew Greenwald called it a "rock & roll masterpiece ... Utilizing the same geographic images as 'Roll Over Beethoven' and 'Johnny B Goode,' (among others), Chuck Berry creates an atmosphere that is definitive rock & roll poetry".

== Renditions ==
A live version of "Let It Rock" was recorded by the Rolling Stones during a performance in Leeds, England, in 1971. Described by critic Stephen Thomas Erlewine as "cooking" and "fiery", the recording was included as the B-side of "Brown Sugar" in the UK in 1971, it was also released on the Spanish issue of the Sticky Fingers (1971) album (as a replacement for the song "Sister Morphine", which was banned by Francisco Franco's regime) and later on the compilations Rarities 1971–2003 (2005) and The Singles 1971–2006 (2011). A later performance of "Let It Rock" opens the concert video The Rolling Stones: Some Girls Live in Texas '78 (2011). The B-side "Too Pooped to Pop" was released as a single by New Zealand band the La De Da's in 1974, which peaked at No. 26 on the Go-Set National Top 40 in Australia.

In December 1975, a live version of "Let It Rock" was recorded by Australian band Skyhooks during a performance in Melbourne. Released as a single with live versions of "Revolution" and "Saturday Night" as the B-side, the song peaked at number 26 in Australia.
