= Ego Is Not a Dirty Word (song) =

Single by Skyhooks

from the album Ego Is Not a Dirty Word
- B-side: "Every Chase a Steeple"
- Released: April 1975
- Studio: TCS Studios, Melbourne
- Genre: Glam rock
- Length: 3:47
- Label: Mushroom
- Songwriter: Greg Macainsh
- Producer: Ross Wilson

Skyhooks singles chronology
"Horror Movie" (1974)	"Ego Is Not a Dirty Word" (1975)	"All My Friends Are Getting Married" (1975)

"Ego Is Not a Dirty Word", also written "Ego (Is Not a Dirty Word)", is a song by Australian band Skyhooks, released in April 1975 as the lead single from the band's second studio album of the same name. It was written by the group's bass guitarist, Greg Macainsh and was produced by Ross Wilson. The song peaked at number two in Australia.

The lyrics of the song discuss – inter alia – the egos of Jesus and Richard Nixon.

In 2010, a financial writer in The Australian described the song as a "Skyhooks classic... with a strong beat and annoying tune.

== Track listing ==
7" single (K-5891)

- Side A "Ego Is Not a Dirty Word" – 3:00
- Side B "Every Chase a Steeple" – 3:42

== Charts ==
=== Weekly charts ===
Chart (1975)	Peak position
Australia (Kent Music Report)	2

=== Year-end charts ===
Chart (1975)	Position
Australia (Kent Music Report)	19
