= Living in the 70's (song) =

Single by Skyhooks

from the album Living in the 70's
- B-side: "You're a Broken Gin Bottle, Baby"
- Released: August 1974
- Studio: TCS Studios, Melbourne
- Length: 3:44
- Label: Mushroom Records
- Songwriter(s): Greg Macainsh
- Producer(s): Ross Wilson

Skyhooks singles chronology
"Living in the 70's" (1974)	"Horror Movie" (1974)

"Living in the 70's" is a song by Australian band Skyhooks. Released in August 1974 as their debut and lead single from the band's debut album of the same name. The song peaked at number 28 in Australia. The band performed the song live on Countdown.

In 2018, the song was ranked at number 72 as part of Triple M's "Ozzest 100", the 'most Australian' songs of all time ranking.

== Track listing ==
7" single (K-5628)

- Side A "Living in the 70's" - 3:44
- Side B "You're a Broken Gin Bottle, Baby" - 4:14

== Charts ==
Chart (1974)	Peak position
Australia (Kent Music Report)	28
