= Horror Movie (song) =

Single by Skyhooks

from the album Living in the 70's
- B-side: "Carlton (Lygon Street Limbo)"
- Released: December 1974
- Recorded: 1974
- Studio: TCS Studios, Melbourne
- Genre: Glam rock
- Length: 3:47
- Label: Mushroom Records
- Songwriter: Greg Macainsh
- Producer: Ross Wilson

Skyhooks singles chronology
"Living in the 70's" (1974)	"Horror Movie" (1974)	"Ego is Not a Dirty Word" (1975)

"Horror Movie" is a song by Australian band Skyhooks, released in December 1974 as the second and final single from the band's debut studio album, Living in the 70's. The song peaked at number one in Australia, staying there for two weeks in March 1975. The single was greatly helped along by the band's appearance on the then-new ABC pop music TV show Countdown.

At the Australian 1975 King of Pop Awards the song won Australian Record of the Year.

Along with "Women in Uniform", "Horror Movie" is widely recognised as one of the Skyhooks' signature tracks. The song itself, written by bass guitarist Greg Macainsh, is about how the world has taken a turn for the worse with all of the chaos in society, to the point where watching the nightly TV news is like watching a horror movie.

== Video ==
Australian music television show Countdown made an in-house video featuring the band at Luna Park, Melbourne as well as miming the song in front of an audience. It was broadcast on the first day of colour television in Australia. In Peter Wilmoth's Glad all over : the Countdown years, it was said, "Shirl here gives the distinct impression that he would rather be surfing. There’s also the (not so) small matter of the ludicrously large outstretched hand painted on the crotch of his tight satin jumpsuit); the gladiator’s hat worn by drummer Freddie Strauks; the black lipstick, white make-up and long black hair on Bob Starkie; and Red Symons who is a remarkable combination of ingénue, geisha and the devil himself." Biographer Jeff Apter agreed, "it was the scene-stealing - or should that be crotch-grabbing - satin sleeveless number he wore that really caught the eye of young Australia. Shirl had perfected the art of TV performance, as he bugged his eyes and stared down the barrel of the camera, pouting and preening."

== Reception ==
In January 2018, as part of Triple M's "Ozzest 100", the 'most Australian' songs of all time, "Horror Movie" was ranked number 47.

Junkee declared it one of the best Australian songs ever, saying, "this song hasn’t earned its place on this list because it’s a searing takedown of modern industrial capitalism, or the news media’s involvement in it. It has earned its place on this list because that chorus is a dagger pressed with gold leaf; a snaking, vicious piece of art that mixes high camp theatre with Beach Boys-esque sonic chops."

== Track listing ==
7" single (K-5753)

- Side A "Horror Movie" - 3:47
- Side B "Carlton (Lygon Street Limbo)" - 3:58

== Charts ==
=== Weekly charts ===
Chart (1974/75)	Peak position
Australia (Kent Music Report)	1

=== Year-end charts ===
Chart (1975)	Peak position
Australia (Kent Music Report)	5

== Legacy ==
In 1998 Australia Post issued a special edition set of twelve stamps celebrating the early years of Australian rock and roll, featuring Australian hit songs of the late 1950s, the 1960s and the early 1970s.

"Each of them said something about us, and told the rest of the world this is what popular culture sounds like, and it has an Australian accent."

One of the stamps featured was the "Horror Movie" stamp.

== Popular references ==
In 2012, Australian Federal Minister for Trade Craig Emerson did an impromptu improvisation of the song when answering a question about the mood in Whyalla, singing "No Whyalla wipe-out there on my TV...shocking me right out of my brain" mocking the claim by the opposition leader that Whyalla would be "wiped off the map" due to the carbon tax.

The track was also used during the ending credits of the 2012 film The ABCs of Death, and was incorrectly titled, "Horror Story".
