= Red Symons =

Australian musician, and television and radio personality (born 1949)

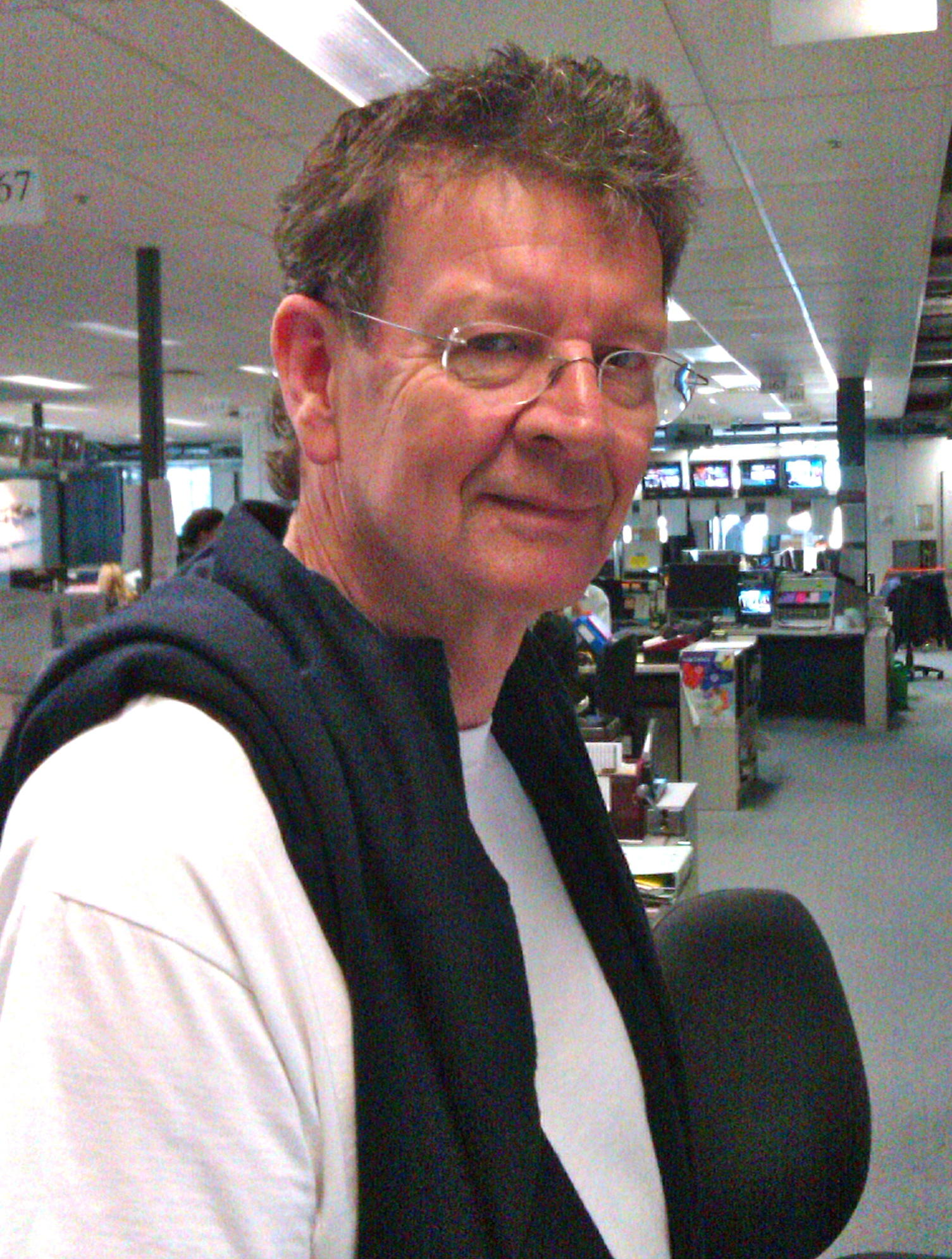
- Symons in 2011
- Born: Redmond Symons; 13 June 1949 (age 77); Brighton, Sussex, England, United Kingdom
- Education: University of Melbourne
- Occupations: Television personality; radio personality; musician; actor
- Known for: Skyhooks; Hey Hey It's Saturday; Australia's Got Talent; The New Rocky Horror Show; ABC Breakfast Radio Host
- Spouse: Elly Symons (m. 1990, divorced)
- Children: 3
- Musical career
- Genre: Rock
- Instruments: Guitar; vocals; keyboards
- Years active: 1970–present
- Formerly of: Skyhooks

Redmond Symons (born 13 June 1949) is an Australian musician and television and radio personality. He was the lead guitarist in the band Skyhooks, the snide judge of 'Red Faces' (a segment of the long-running variety show Hey Hey It's Saturday) and a judge on talent search show Australia's Got Talent. He hosted ABC Radio Melbourne's breakfast show from 2003 until 2017.

== Early life and education ==
Born in England, he emigrated to Australia at the age of nine in 1958 (on the same ship as the members of the Bee Gees). Symons was educated at Emerald Primary School, Monbulk High School, Upwey High School and the University of Melbourne, where he resided at Queen's College and obtained a Bachelor of Science degree in pure mathematics and computer science.

== Career ==
=== Musical career ===
After graduating, Symons joined the Australian rock band Skyhooks as a guitarist in the 1970s. He also worked in the theatre as a musical director for several organisations, including The Pram Factory, a famous 1970s Melbourne theatre group. Symons also had three solo singles, "It's Only a Flipside" (EMI 1976); "The Big Time" (Mushroom 1987); and "Sex Appeal" (Mushroom 1988); none of these songs entered the Australian top 100.

=== Television career ===
In 1985, Symons guest-starred in Neighbours as criminal Gordon Miller, Terry Robinson's ex-husband.

Throughout the 1980s and 1990s, he combined his on-air role on Hey Hey It's Saturday (also playing in the house band) with composing for various film and television shows (such as Blue Heelers) and jingle-writing.

Between 1992 and 1995, he played the role of the narrator in The Rocky Horror Show, touring Australia and Singapore.

In 2003, he appeared on the Australian version of Who Wants to Be a Millionaire? and became the first Australian celebrity to reach the $500,000 question; however, he lost $218,000 after failing to answer that Benvenuto Cellini was an architect and not a sculptor, going away with $16,000 for his chosen charity and $16,000 for his home viewer.

Between 2001 and 2011, Symons appeared in advertisements for Thrifty-Link Hardware.

In February 2002, he hosted the Nine Network show Shafted, which was cancelled in April the same year. Later in 2002, he was a contestant on Celebrity Big Brother.

Symons' on-camera persona is a sarcastic killjoy, a role he apparently adopted through his appearance as third judge on 'Red Faces'. On Test Australia: The National IQ Test he scored higher than any of the other celebrities with an IQ of 131.

In October 2005, Symons together with his wife, Elly, competed in and won the 'Celebrity Couples Great Temptation' with Elly answering all the questions in the fast money round during the grand final. He also competed in Network Ten's Australia's Brainiest Comedian the following month, in which he came third.

In 2007, he signed with Channel Seven to be a judge on Australia's Got Talent along with Dannii Minogue and Tom Burlinson. He remained on the show until 2009 and was replaced by Brian McFadden.

In August 2008, Symons participated on a celebrity edition of Deal or No Deal, on which he won $4,000 for a home viewer. He was also a regular member of the brains trust on ABC TV's The Einstein Factor.

In 2009, Symons appeared on the two Hey Hey Reunion Specials, and in 2010, returned to the 20-episode airing of Hey Hey It's Saturday.

He appeared on Who Wants to Be a Millionaire? again in February 2021 and won $1,000 after missing his tenth question, this time saying that the word 'entrepreneur' came from the French for 'present yourselves', rather than 'rendezvous'.

=== Radio career ===
Symons originally appeared as a presenter in a weekly slot on the ABC Radio Melbourne's breakfast radio program. He then filled in for Lynne Haultain on the breakfast program while she was on maternity leave, replacing her permanently in that slot in 2003, and continuing in the role until late 2017.

In June 2017, Symons interviewed fellow ABC radio presenter Beverley Wang about her new podcast, It's Not a Race. During the interview, Symons asked Wang questions such as "What's the deal with Asians?", "Are they all the same?" and "Are you yellow?", and defended the infamous "blackface" skit on Hey Hey It's Saturday. Most of the controversial comments were edited out of the broadcast interview, but Wang released the full interview on the podcast feed. The ABC removed the recording, saying that "a review of the editorial processes around this content and its use is in progress" and apologised for its broadcast.

In December 2017 Symons announced that he would not return to the breakfast presenter role in 2018 after he was advised that the ABC did not renew his contract.

== Personal life ==
Symons married Elly Agrotis in 1990 and together they had three sons, Samuel, Raphael and Joel, they later divorced in 2016.

An Australian Story episode aired in February 2010 that documented his son Samuel's fifteen-year battle with cancer. The episode won a silver medal at the 2011 New York Festivals "Worlds Best T.V. and Films" Category and a Quill award in 2010 from the Melbourne Press Club for Best Current Affairs Feature. Samuel died from an aggressive brain cancer on 3 October 2018 at the age of 27.
