= Greg Macainsh =

- Born: Gregory John Macainsh; 30 December 1950 (age 75); Melbourne, Victoria, Australia
- Genres: Pop; rock; glam rock
- Occupations: Musician; lawyer
- Instruments: Bass guitar; backing vocals
- Years active: 1973–1980; 1983; 1984; 1990; 1994

Gregory John Macainsh (born 30 December 1950) is an Australian former musician and songwriter. He provided bass guitar and backing vocals for pop rockers, Skyhooks from 1973 to 1980 and subsequently for various reformations. According to Australian musicologist, Ian McFarlane, "Macainsh's biting, provocative songs were the perfect expression of adolescent obsessions and frustrations. With those songs, the band made an enormous impact on Australian social life." Macainsh became an intellectual property lawyer.

== Biography ==
Gregory John Macainsh was born on 30 December 1950 and grew up in Warrandyte. His father was a philosopher, engineer and some-time poet and his mother was a librarian. He attended Norwood High School, Ringwood and recalled attending a Scouting jamboree when he heard the Beatles on the radio. "It was wild stuff, amazing. I lost interest in the Scouts and concentrated on music. The little tranny had just hit. I listened to a valve radio at home and then to a crystal radio set I made for my bedroom. 3UZ was the station and Stan Rofe was the man."

In 1966, with Macainsh on bass guitar and school mate, Freddie Strauks on lead vocals, he formed a group, Spare Parts. It was followed by Sound Pump two years later; Macainsh then formed Reuben Tice in Eltham, with Tony Williams on vocals. One of their songs, written by Macainsh, was "I Went Down to Eltham to Get Me a Job in a Band". By 1970 Macainsh was back with Strauks, who was now on drums, first in Claptrap and by 1971 in Frame, which had Graeme "Shirley" Strachan as lead vocalist. The line-up also included Pat O'Brien and Cynthio Ooms on guitars. Australian rock music journalist, Ed Nimmervoll observed, "[Reuben Tice were] a local group that hardly ever ventured out of its alternate lifestyle Eltham area, [Frame were] a group that looked for gigs in inner suburban Melbourne."

In March 1973, Macainsh on bass guitar, backing vocals and as main songwriter, and Strauks on drums and backing vocals, formed Skyhooks in Melbourne as a glam rock, pop rock group. Other founders were Steve Hill on vocals (ex-Lillee), Peter Inglis on guitar (ex-the Captain Matchbox Whoopee Band), and Peter Starkie on guitar and backing vocals (ex-Lipp & the Double Dekker Brothers). By August Bob "Bongo" Starkie (ex-Mary Jane Union) on guitar replaced his older brother, Peter Starkie, and Inglis was replaced by Red Symons (ex-Scumbag) on guitar, vocals and keyboards. Ross Wilson (ex-Daddy Cool) caught one of their early gigs and signed Macainsh to a publishing deal. Late in that year they were signed to Michael Gudinski's booking agency, Australian Entertainment Exchange, and eventually to his label, Mushroom Records. The group recorded two live tracks, "Hey What's the Matter" (written by Macainsh) and "Love on the Radio" (co-written by Macainsh and Hill), during their performance at the Sunbury Pop Festival in January 1974. These tracks appeared on Mushroom Record's various artists' live album, Highlights of Sunbury '74 (1974).

In June 1974, three months after Strachan had replaced Hill, Skyhooks recorded their debut album, Living in the 70's (October 1974), with nine of its ten tracks written by Macainsh. According to Australian musicologist, Ian McFarlane, "Macainsh's biting, provocative songs were the perfect expression of adolescent obsessions and frustrations. With those songs, the band made an enormous impact on Australian social life." The album spent 16 weeks at the top of the Kent Music Report Albums Chart from late February 1975, and became the highest-selling album by an Australian act until that time, with shipment of 240,000 copies. In October 2010 it was listed at No. 9 in the book, 100 Best Australian Albums.

Ego Is Not a Dirty Word (July 1975), Skyhooks' second album, spent 11 weeks at the number-one spot and shipped 180,000 copies. Of its ten tracks Macainsh wrote eight and co-wrote another with former member, Hill. Nimmervoll opined, "With two of the biggest selling Australian albums of all time to their credit, the band put everything into the most elaborated stage settings Australia had ever seen. Everything Skyhooks did put Australian music on a level never seen before." Macainsh's then girlfriend, Jenny Brown, wrote a book about the band in 1975, entitled Skyhooks : Million Dollar Riff. Macainsh remained with Skyhooks until it disbanded in 1980.

=== After Skyhooks ===
Macainsh has participated in Skyhooks reunions in 1983, 1984, 1990 and 1994. He also played with John Farnham on his Whispering Jack Tour in 1986–87 and appears in the music video for Farnham's single, "You're the Voice" (1986). According to Farnham's manager, Glenn Wheatley, "[the video] was done on a shoestring budget. I called in Derryn and Jacki, some of the guys from Pseudo Echo (James and Vince Leigh) and Greg Macainsh from Skyhooks are in the band, it was pretty much anyone who'd do me a favour." Macainsh later worked with Dave Warner's from the Suburbs. In 1988 he put together and managed an AC/DC tribute band, Back in Black, which supported Skyhooks on a reunion tour. He was a board member of Australasian Performing Right Association (APRA) (1997–2000) and Phonographic Performance Company of Australia (PPCA) (2001–06), and is an intellectual property lawyer.

== Awards ==
=== King of Pop Awards ===
The King of Pop Awards were voted by the readers of TV Week. The King of Pop award started in 1967 and ran through to 1978.

Year	Nominee / work	Award	Result
1975	Greg Macainsh	Best Australian Songwriter	Won
