= 1978–2008 =

Compilation album by Matt Finish
- Released: January 2008
- Studios: Unity Gain Studios, Sydney
- Genre: Rock
- Label: Mammal Music
- Producer: John Prior

1978–2008 is an album by Australian band Matt Finish that was released in January 2008 under the Mammal Music record label celebrating the band's 30th anniversary. The album is an anthology of the band's best-known songs, including Short Note plus three previously released songs, all freshly recorded before Christmas 2007.

Australian journalist Deb Laylor writes: "Music is next to laughter as medicine for the soul and I could easily OD on this dose. This CD has helped me cope and deal with all things in life. It has been in the player and I still haven't and don't expect to tire of it."

== Track listing ==
All tracks are written by Matt Moffitt, John Prior, except where noted.

1978–2008 track listing
No.	Title	Writer(s)	Length
1.	"Dream Away"
2.	"Cold Wars"
3.	"Still Roads"
4.	"Introductions"	Jeff Clayton, Rick Grossman, Moffitt, Prior
5.	"Short Note"	Moffitt, Moffitt
6.	"Mancini Shuffle"	Moffitt
7.	"Layman's Day"	Moffitt
8.	"Hot Cover"
9.	"Eat Your Lips Off"	Clayton, Grossman, Moffitt, Prior
10.	"Don't Fade Away"	Clayton, Grossman, Moffitt, Prior
11.	"River"	Moffitt, Moffitt

== Personnel ==
=== Musicians ===
- David Adams – vocals, guitar
- Harry Brus – bass, vocals
- Parrish Muhoberac – guitar, vocals
- John Prior – drums, keys, vocals

=== Production ===
- Recorded and produced at Unity Gain Studios by John Prior
- Mastered at King Willie Sound by William Bowden
