= As Little as a Look =

As Little As A Look

Studio album by Matt Moffitt
- Released: 1986
- Studio: ICP Recording Studios, CBS Studios, Hot Nights Studios
- Genre: Rock
- Label: CBS
- Producer: Nicky Graham

As Little As A Look is the debut (and only) solo studio album by Australian artist Matt Moffitt. The album was recorded in London and Belgium with Matt Finish co-founder and Australian drummer John Prior and English producer Nicky Graham in 1985.

The album spawned the singles "Miss This Tonight" and "All That Stuff", both of which peaked inside the Australian top 100.

== Tracks ==
- All songs written by Matt Moffitt and Pete Glenister, except where noted.
1. Heathen Kind 5:18
2. By As Little As a Look 4:08
3. Miss This Tonight 4:44
4. Thursday 4:49
5. Overland (Moffitt, Nicky Graham) 4:53
6. All That Stuff 4:05
7. Save Your Worry (Moffitt) 4:40
8. BB's (Moffitt) 4:34
9. Fever Pitch (Moffitt) 3:31
10. Ocean Chimes 5:37
11. Light Me Up 3:19

== Personnel ==
- Matt Moffitt - vocals
- John Prior - drum programming
- Rob Fisher - keyboards, bass
- Felix Krish - bass guitar (track 7)
- Pete Glenister - guitar
- Nicky Graham - production, keyboards, bass
- Dale Barlow - saxophone (track 6)
- Wendy Dorsett - backing vocals
- Peter Ashworth - photography
- Green Ink - artwork, design

== Charts ==
Chart (1986)	Peak position
Australia (Kent Music Report)	30
