= Fade Away (Matt Finish EP) =

EP by Matt Finish
- Released: October 1981
- Recorded: The PACT Theatre, July 1981
- Genre: Rock
- Label: Giant
- Producer: Colin Lee Hong

Matt Finish chronology
Short Note (1981)	Fade Away (1981)	Word of Mouth (1984)

Fade Away is an EP by Matt Finish. It was recorded live during two sessions at Sydney's PACT theatre in July 1981. Fade Away captured the rawness and power of the live performances for which Matt Finish was renowned.

== Track listing ==
1. "Introductions"
2. "Fade Away"
3. "It's On My Way"
4. "Eat Your Lips Off"
5. "Calls"

== Charts ==
Chart (1981)	Peak position
Australia (Kent Music Report)	50

== Personnel ==
- Matt Moffitt – vocals/guitar
- Jeff Clayton – guitar/vocals
- Rick Grossman – bass
- John Prior – drums
