= Word of Mouth (Matt Finish album) =

Studio album by Matt Finish
- Released: 1984
- Recorded: Rhinoceros Studios, Albert Studios, Sydney
- Genre: Rock
- Label: CBS
- Producer: Colin Freeman, Matt Finish

Matt Finish chronology
Fade Away (1981)	Word of Mouth (1984)	By Heart (1993)

Word of Mouth is the second studio album by Australian band Matt Finish. The album was released in 1984, and produced the singles "Always Another" (May 1984), "Words and Wars" (June 1984) and "Come On Over" (September 1984). When promoting the album, the band supported U2 on their Under Australian Skies Tour.

== Track listing ==
(All songs by Matt Moffitt except where noted)

1. "Out On Those Moments"
2. "Tai Ming Money" (Matt Moffitt, Jeff Clayton, John Prior)
3. "Come On Over"
4. "Light Up My Days"
5. "Always Another"
6. "Died in Love"
7. "Does It Feel" (Moffitt, Prior)
8. "Words and Wars"
9. "Still Roads (I Need It)" (Moffitt, Prior, Clayton)
10. "Blind And Running"

== Charts ==
Chart (1984)	Peak position
Australia (Kent Music Report)	25

== Personnel ==
- Matt Moffitt – guitar, lead vocals
- Jeff Clayton – bass, backing vocals
- John Prior – drums, backing vocals, percussion, tuned percussion, keyboards

Additional personnel

- Ken Francis — guitar (tracks 2, 6)
- Burt Dorsett — guitar (track 4), fretless bass (track 10)
- Rob Riley — guitar (tracks 5)
- Anthony Smith — keyboards (tracks 4, 8–10)
- Jim Cox – congas (tracks 1, 8)
