= JG =

JG or J. G. may refer to:

- Jagdgeschwader unit of the Imperial German Air Service of World War I or the Luftwaffe (German air force), in World War II
- Job guarantee, a proposal for full employment
- The Journal Gazette, a newspaper in Fort Wayne, Indiana, United States
- Jornal da Globo (abbreviated as JG), a Brazilian late-night news program
- Junior grade, subdivision of various military ranks
- Josh Gordon, an American football wide receiver
- Jonita Gandhi, Indian-born-Canadian singer
- JetGo, an airline (IATA code JG)
- Janatha Garage, 2016 Indian film, abbreviated JG
- JG Faherty, American novelist
- JG Montgomery, Australian/English author
- JG Motorsports, former NASCAR team
- JG Summit Holdings, Filipino conglomerate
- JG Thirlwell, Australian composer, producer and musician
