= By Heart =

By Heart may refer to:

- By Heart (Brenda K. Starr album) or the title song, 1991
- By Heart (Conway Twitty album) or the title song, 1984
- By Heart (Lea Salonga album), 1999
- By Heart (Matt Finish album) or the title song, 1993
- ByHeart, an American infant formula company

== See also ==
- Rote learning
