= Ten Pound Poms =

British migrants to Australia and New Zealand

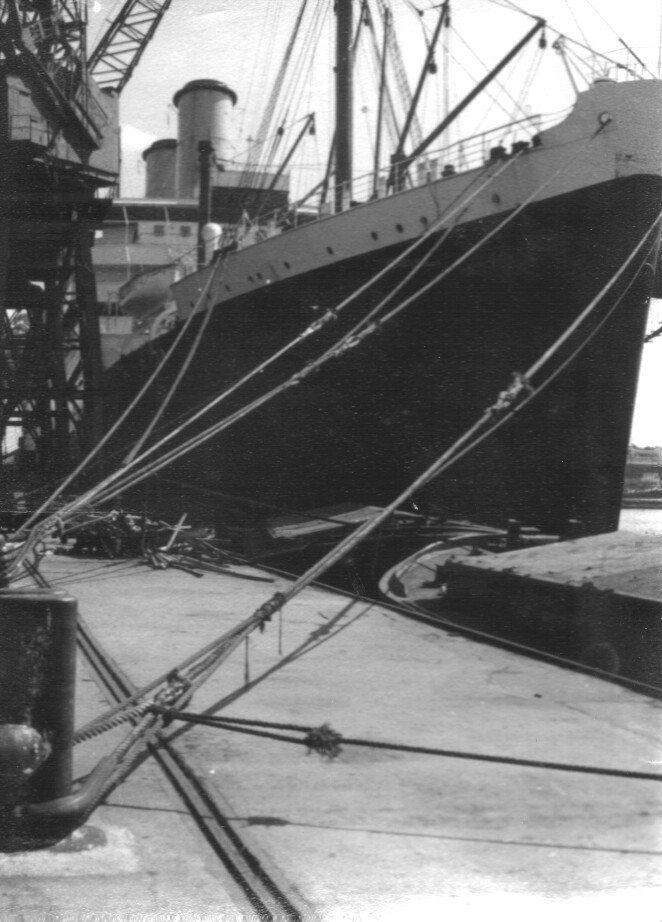
The Orient Line ship Orontes in Tilbury Docks, c. 1957, shortly before sailing for Sydney, carrying (mainly) migrants on the assisted passage scheme

Ten Pound Poms were British citizens who migrated to Australia and New Zealand after the Second World War. The government of Australia initiated the Assisted Passage Migration Scheme in 1945, and the government of New Zealand initiated a similar scheme in 1947. The Australian government arranged for assisted passage to Australia on chartered ships and aircraft.

The migrants were called Ten Pound Poms because of the charge of £10 in processing fees to migrate to Australia.

== Assisted Passage Migration Scheme ==
The Assisted Passage Migration Scheme was created in 1945 by the Chifley government and its first Minister for Immigration, Arthur Calwell, as part of the "Populate or Perish" policy. It was intended to substantially increase the population of Australia and to supply workers for the country's booming industries. As well as subsidising the cost of travelling to Australia, the government promised employment prospects, affordable housing, and a generally more optimistic lifestyle. But upon arrival, migrants were placed in basic migration hostels and the expected job opportunities were not always readily available.

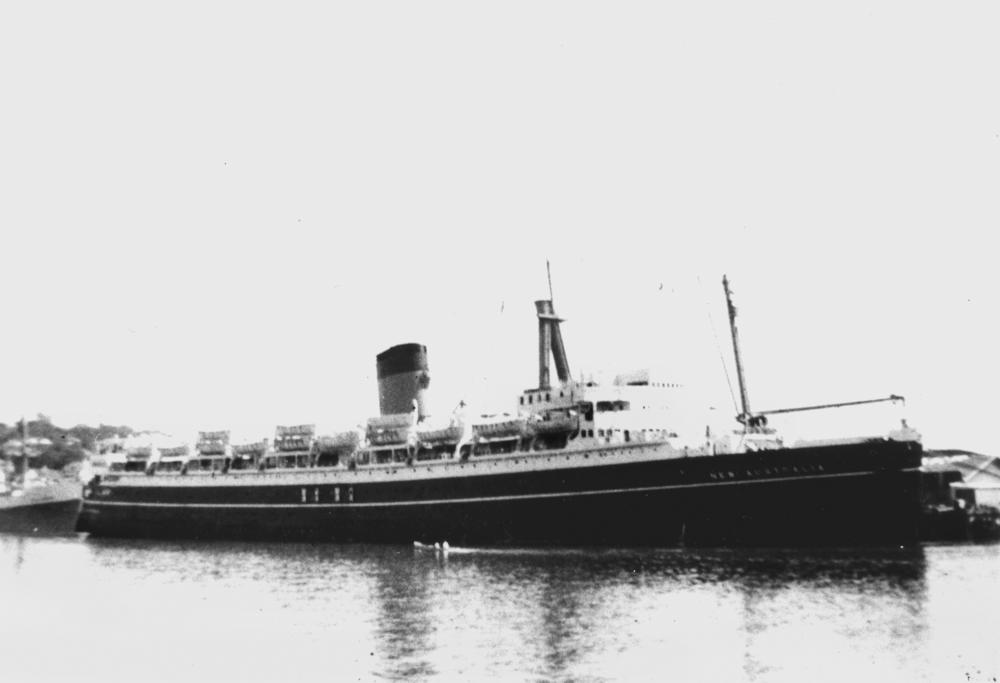
In the 1950s Shaw, Savill operated New Australia for the UK Ministry of Transport to take migrants from the UK to Australia

Adult migrants were charged only ten pounds sterling for the fare (hence the name; in 1945 British pounds, equivalent to £373 in 2025), and migrant scheme children travelled free of charge. It was a follow-on to the unofficial Big Brother Movement and attracted more than a million migrants from the British Isles between 1945 and 1972. It was the last substantial scheme for preferential migration from the British Isles to Australia. In 1957, more migrants were encouraged to travel following a campaign called "Bring out a Briton". The scheme reached its peak in 1969, when more than 80,000 migrants took advantage of the scheme. In 1973, the cost to migrants of the assisted passage was increased to £75 (equivalent to £815 in 2025). The scheme was ended in 1982.

While the term 'Ten Pound Pom' is in common use, the scheme was not limited to migrants from the United Kingdom. People born in the Irish Free State or in the southern counties of Ireland before the establishment of the Republic of Ireland in 1949 were also classified as British subjects, as outlined in British nationality law and the Republic of Ireland. In fact, most British subjects were eligible and, at the time, that included not only those from the British Isles but also residents of British colonies such as Malta and Cyprus. Australia also operated schemes to assist selected migrants from other countries, notably the Netherlands (1951), Italy (1951), Greece (1952), West Germany (1952) and Turkey (1967).

Assisted migrants were generally required to remain in Australia for two years after arrival, or alternatively refund the cost of their assisted passage. If they chose to travel back to Britain within those two years, the cost of that steamship journey between Australia and Britain was prohibitive, costing at least £120 (in 1945 pounds, equivalent to £4,478 in 2025). It was a large sum in those days and one that most could not afford. Some did return to Britain after the two years in Australia, having worked hard to save up the return fare. Over a million Britons settled in Australia due to this campaign, while 250,000 migrants ended up heading back to Britain. (All prices are quoted in UK pounds.)

It was also possible for many British people to migrate to Australia on a non-assisted basis before the early 1970s, although most travelled as Ten Pounders. This was part of the wider White Australia policy. An estimated quarter of British migrants returned to the UK within the qualifying period; however, half of these – the so-called Boomerang Poms – returned to Australia.

Before 1 December 1973, migrants to Australia from Commonwealth countries were eligible to apply for Australian citizenship after one year's residence in Australia. In 1973, the residence requirement was extended to three years, the requirements being place of residence, good character, knowledge of the language, and rights and duties of citizenship and the intention to live permanently in Australia. In November 1984, the residence requirement was reduced to two years. However, relatively few British migrants – compared to other post-war arrivals, such as Turks – took up Australian citizenship. Consequently, many may have lost their Australian residency status later on, usually through leaving Australia.

== New Zealand scheme ==
The government of New Zealand initiated a similar immigration scheme in July 1947. The first immigrants arrived on the RMS Rangitata later that year. The scheme was administered by the Department of Labour under the guidance of Bert Bockett, and was expanded to include the Netherlands in 1950. The Dutch immigration scheme ended in 1963, with just over 6,000 immigrants to New Zealand. Bockett received the Olivier van Noort medallion from the Dutch government in the following year. The British immigration scheme lasted until 1971, with 76,673 immigrants. From 1957 to 1971, the scheme applied to further European countries, with a total of 1,442 immigrants.

== Notable participants ==
=== Australia ===
Prime Minister Julia Gillard migrated with her family from Barry, Glamorgan, Wales, in 1966, aged four. Her parents hoped the warmer climate would help cure her lung infection.

Another prime minister, Tony Abbott, migrated in 1960 under the scheme, although his father had already lived in Australia after arriving at the beginning of the Second World War on a Blue Funnel Liner and his mother was an Australian expatriate living in Britain at the time of his birth.

England fast bowlers Harold Larwood (in 1950) and Frank Tyson (in 1960) also took advantage of the scheme when they retired from cricket.

The Bee Gees (Gibb brothers), born on the Isle of Man, spent their first few years in Chorlton-cum-Hardy, Manchester, England, then moved in the late 1950s to Redcliffe in Queensland, where they began their musical careers.

The five original members of the Easybeats migrated independently and formed their band after arriving in Sydney. Lead singer Stevie Wright migrated from Leeds, England. Harry Vanda migrated from The Hague, Netherlands, and George Young migrated from Glasgow, Scotland, to become the two guitarists and later the songwriting team that took the Easybeats to the world with "Friday on My Mind". In 1973, George's younger brothers, Malcolm and Angus Young, formed AC/DC; the following year, another Scottish immigrant, Bon Scott, became the band's lead vocalist.

Other musical artists to have migrated to Australia under the scheme include John Farnham, Jimmy Barnes. John Paul Young, Colin Hay of Men at Work, Steve Kilbey of The Church, Jon English and Cheetah, while Kylie Minogue is the daughter of two Ten Pound Poms; her mother was on the same ship as the Gibbses and Red Symons.

Businessman Alan Bond moved to Australia with his parents in 1950. He was named "Australian of the Year" in 1978.

Rugby league player and actor Ian Roberts moved to Sydney with his family in 1967. According to Roberts, he "was brought up in an English household and Australia existed outside the front door".

Actor Nicholas Hope, best known for his role in the 1994 film Bad Boy Bubby, was born in Manchester in 1958 and migrated to Whyalla, South Australia soon afterwards.

== See also ==
- The Feldons' song "Win One Time" off their 2012 album Goody Hallett and Other Stories refers to Ten Pound Poms, as the writer's father-in-law was one
- Ten Pound Poms (BBC television series)
