= Dance the Night Away =

Dance the Night Away may refer to:

- "Dance the Night Away" (The Mavericks song)
- "Dance the Night Away" (Twice song)
- "Dance the Night Away" (Sheer Elegance song)
- "Dance the Night Away" (Van Halen song)
- "Dance the Night Away", a song by Cream from the album Disraeli Gears
- "Dance the Night Away", a song by the Cat Empire from the album Where the Angels Fall
- "Dance the Night Away", a song by Europe from the album Wings of Tomorrow
- "Dance The Night Away", a song by Climax Blues Band from the album Flying the Flag

== See also ==
- "Dance the Night", 2023 song by Dua Lipa
