= The Feldons =

- Origin: Canberra, Australia
- Genres: Mod, rock, pop
- Label: Independent
- Members: Mark Hunstone (guitar/vocals), James Montgomery (bass/vocals), Adam Bowler (drums)
- Past members: Nick Giles (drums), Peter Thomas (keys), Joe Pryor (drums)
- Website: www.thefeldons.com

The Feldons is an Australian three-piece Britpop/powerpop band based in Canberra, Australia. It came together in 2006 and consists of Mark Hunstone on guitar and vocals, James Montgomery on bass and vocals, and Adam Bowler on drums and vocals.

== History ==
Joe Pryor played drums for the band from 2006-08. Upon Pryor's move to New York in 2008, Nick Giles became the drummer. Keyboard player Pete Thomas joined the band between mid-2010 and mid-2011. Drummer Nick Giles left in late 2014 and was replaced by Adam Bowler, who had previously played for Positive Feedback Loop.

They have been described as "something very Ferry on the Mersey", or Beatlesque. "Mention of Paul Weller (does) not quite nail the sound but there is an undertone of that British invasion rock and roll that was big in the sixties" and "entertaining, danceable, listenable as well as easy on the eye". The SixtyOne.com commented that they "have been waiting for this sound for a while now and the feldons deliver."

BMA Magazine wrote of the band, "it would appear that these guys have been brought up on a diet of late 60s British pop, mid 70s American blues, yet at times, with a peculiar mid-90s Britpop feel. One could even think at times that they are a decade, if not three, out of time. Think Supergrass meets the Libertines meets the Beatles meet Dire Straits and you'd be wrong, but close. Worth a listen." BMA also commented on their latest record, Goody Hallett and Other Stories that it is [a] "solid album with some definite single-worthy tracks", and that it "wouldn't have sounded out of place in a groovy record shop in swinging London."

Of their third album Human Graffiti BMA magazine commented that the album "sees the folk influences of the Goody Hallett and Other Stories album left behind for a more poppy, up-tempo collection of songs," and that the album "is full of catchy, bright foot tappers."

A fourth full-length album Paintbox was released online in late 2017.

Triple J Unearthed commented that "There's a definite[sic] 60s pop sensibility with the harmonized vocals coming in and out and the semi-psychedelic fadeout(s) at the end. The guitar hooks (are) very catchy indeed and complements the vocals perfectly" and "classic rock rhythm/beat that makes you move like a tool around your kitchen and sing into your cooking utensils".

Renowned and respected Australian guitarist and songwriter Tony Jaggers said of the band's latest (August 2012) release See the Sun, "if this had come out as a Beatles song then it would be one of their best. Its (sic) a standout tune amongst today's dross and it would be a crime if it doesn't get recognition."

Hunstone and Montgomery write all the band's material with obvious influences from 1960s British pop/ rock, mod, 1970s American electric blues.

The band has shared the bill with acts such as Angry Anderson, the Marji Curran Trio, Julia and the Deep Sea Sirens, Daniel Champagne, Bruce Callaway (The Saints), Phil Hall (Lime Spiders), Richard in your Mind, award-winning blues vocalist Jonno Zilber, James Southwell, Harry Brus (Australian Crawl, Kevin Borich, Renée Geyer) as well as known Canberra acts such as the Crossbones, Slow Turismo and Space Party. The Feldons have also recorded with traditional cymbalom player Tim Meyen from Triplicate during the MITACT 2620 sessions. The band has also played the prestigious Summer Rhythm Festival in Canberra. Overall the band enjoyed good reviews but relatively poor commercial success.

In September 2012 the band teamed up with Austography Productions to film "See the Sun" taken from the Goody Hallett album.

The band took their name from Get Smart actress Barbara Feldon quoting that "She is one of the hottest chicks to ever grace a television set."

In April 2018 Montgomery released a solo album Paper Walls under the name James Montgomery-Willcox.

James Montgomery is the older brother of British based composer and conductor Jessica Cottis and is a published author, writing under the name of JG Montgomery. Mark Hunstone is an environmentalist and climate change expert. Previous drummer Giles was a keen surfer and motorcycle enthusiast.

== Discography ==
=== Albums ===
- A Cabinet of Human Oddities (Pendragon Publishing & Design 2008)
- Goody Hallett and Other Stories (Pendragon Publishing & Design- September 2012 )
- Human Graffiti (Pendragon Publishing & Design November 2014)
- Paintbox (Pendragon Publishing & Design November 2017)
