= Ian Moffitt =

Australian journalist and novelist

- Born: 31 July 1926; Sydney
- Died: 1 November 2000 (aged 74); Sydney
- Occupation: novelist
- Writing career
- Language: English
- Years active: 1967–1993

Ian Moffitt (31 July 1926 – 1 November 2000) was an Australian journalist and novelist best known for his best-selling novel The Retreat Of Radiance.

He headed News Limited bureau in New York in the early 1960s and was an outstanding feature writer for The Australian newspaper in the late 1960s and 1970s before becoming a full-time novelist in 1981.

== History ==
Born in Sydney on 31 July 1926, Moffitt grew up in Taree on the north coast of New South Wales. He worked for The Sun as a copy boy and became a cadet early in 1945.

In 1949, during the Chinese Civil War, he joined the staff of the South China Morning Post and it was his experience in Hong Kong and China that inspired The Retreat Of Radiance. First published in 1982 by William Collins, The Retreat Of Radiance was four months on the bestseller list, six weeks at number one.

He then became a reporter, sub-editor, feature writer and foreign correspondent for Australian newspapers and magazines, including The Daily Mirror (Australia), The Sydney Morning Herald, The Australian and The Bulletin.

== Personal ==
Moffitt married Elizabeth Saunders and had five children: Matthew, Annabel, Dominic, Frances and Sophie. Their eldest son, Matt, was the lead vocalist, guitarist and songwriter with Australian band Matt Finish, one of Australia's most popular live bands from the late seventies until the mid-nineties. Matt died in 2003. Sophie is a dancer, choreographer and contemporary dance teacher, whose production company ‘Bounce Productions’, is involved with corporate events in Australia, Asia, America and New Zealand.

Ian's first marriage ended in divorce and he then married Margaret O'Sullivan, a journalist, literary agent, author of several cookbooks and co-author (with Candace Lewis) of Three of the Best – The Modern Woman's Guide to Everything (ABC Books, 2008).

Ian Moffitt died on 1 November 2000.

== Bibliography ==
=== Novels ===
- The Retreat Of Radiance: A Novel of Revenge (1982)
- The Colour Man (published in the US as Presence Of Evil) (1983)
- Blue Angels (1987)
- Death Adder Dreaming (1988)
- Gilt Edge (1991)

=== Short story collections ===
- Deadlines (1985)
- The Electric Jungle (1993)

=== Non-fiction ===
- The Australian Outback (The World's Wild Places) (1981)
