= Irving Martin =

- Born: 1945–1947
- Genre: Various
- Occupation: Record producer
- Labels: Deram, Bruton Music, Regency Line, Strut Records
- Formerly of: Irving Martin and the M Squad, Martin's Magic Sounds
- Website: http://www.martinruk.net/IrvingMartin/

Irving Martin is an executive producer, creative director and record producer. Not including other record labels he worked with, during the 1960s, he produced more than forty-five singles that were released on the CBS label. He produced Guy Darrell's Top 20 hit, "I've Been Hurt" and had further chart success with the London Philharmonic Choir. In addition to producing solo artists and bands, he has either produced or composed music for television shows or films such as Return of the Saint, The Sweeney, Space 1999 and The Jigsaw Man, and has appeared on Make 'Em Laugh. He has often worked with Brian Dee and has also worked with Des Champ.

== Background ==
In the 1970s he worked as a record producer, writer and film music supervisor. Main companies were ITC, Columbia, "20th Fox and Warners. Several international Gold and Platinum and (RIAA Cert) First producer to successfully make exclusive albums for TV Promotion all made in association with Arcade Records. Composed music for Return of the Saint.

In the 1980s he headed Scores Ltd,. the #1 Company in Europe for trailers, promos, programming, interstitial segment conceptualization/production and film music production. He launched Sky TV in Europe. He conceived and produced the A Year To Remember' series - selling over 3m copies. He won several awards for soundtracks, record production, and logo designs.

1990–1995: Working Title Films, Head of Special Projects.

1996–2005: In partnership with The Sanctuary Group - CEO Key Film and Film and TV - the leading infomercial producer in Europe.

He earned top international awards in direct response TV as a Producer and Director. He was credited with creating over $3.25b in sales.

His work as a record producer won US triple platinum (RIAA Cert) on the re-issue of the Dove Awarded recording of The Messiah - John Alldis/LPO/LPO Choir (Sparrow)

== Career, artist ==
On June 21, 1962, Martin's musical outfit, a jazz group, Irving Martin and the M Squad appeared on the television show, Make 'Em Laugh.

In 1968, his group Martin's Magic Sounds released their self-titled album on Deram SML 1014. The album contained the tracks, "A Taste of Honey", "Edelweiss", "I Was Kaiser Bill's Batman", "Java", "Mon amour, mon amour" and "Yellow Days". The previous year, the group had also released a single, "Mon Amour, Mon Amour" bw "Midem Melody".

== Career producer ==
=== 1960s ===
Martin produced Johnny Devlin's cover of the Righteous Brothers' song "Hung on You". It was released on CBS 202085. It was reviewed by Disc and Music Echo in the quick spins section of the June 18, 1966, issue. Also that year, Lord Sutch's single, "The Cheat" bw " Black and Hairy" was released on CBS 202080. Martin produced the single and accompaniment was by Des Champ.

Music reporter David Wigg had asked Chris Andrews to write a song for him. With Martin producing and Des Champ handling the arrangements the CBS single, "Life is Complicated" bw "Turning Round" which was released in July, 1966 could have been a winner. With the lack of airplay and sales, the single didn't go anywhere. Wigg carried on interviewing musical celebrities.

Martin produced the single "Come Back, Baby Come Back" bw "Since My Baby Said Goodbye" which was recorded by Romeo Z. It was released on CBS 202645 in 1967. It was listed in the CB New Hit Singles selection in the April 1 issue of Melody Maker. It got a brief review in the Shop Window section of the April 8, 1967, issue of New Musical Express. The raw vibrant excitement, Latin and R&B influences, congas and brass were noted.

Martin produced the first single for West Midlands group, The Californians. The single was "Golden Apples" bw "Little Ship with a Red Sail", which was released in 1967. He added a lot of orchestration and echo to produce a Spector type of Wall of Sound effect. Later he produced their single, "Follow Me" bw What Love Can Do" which was released later that year.

Also in the late 1960s, Irving Martin was sending out demos to musicians for them to think about doing. John O'Hara of the Wolverton band, The Californians recalled that one of the demos that was sent to them in a brown paper bag was "Let's Go to San Francisco". Ohara rung Martin and was told that the group who did the demo, The Flower Pot Men were releasing it as a single. Ohara would later wonder what would have happened if they themselves had released it. The CD compilation, Early Morning Sun: 60s Harmony Pop Produced by Irving Martin was released on the Teensville label in 2019. It contains all of the group's output. It has been described as "comprehensive look at producer Irving Martin's big-budget harmony pop productions in the mid-to-late 60s".

Producing singles for artists, his productions were released on more than 45 singles on the CBS label in the UK between 1965 and 1969.

=== 1970s ===
In the week ending, August 25, 1973, Guy Darrell's record I've Been Hurt" which he produced had entered the British chart at no. 41. It would eventually peak at no. 12.

On the week of December 18, 1976, the London Philharmonic Choir's album, Sounds of Glory which he produced had been in the Music Week Top Albums chart for six weeks. It had moved down from no. 21 to no. 23. The following week it was at no. 20.

Martin co-wrote the song "Dance the Night Away" that was recorded by Sheer Elegance. Backed with "Don't Wanna Miss My Bus", it was released on Pye 7N 25734 in early 1977. It did get airplay with spins on Piccadilly Radio. It was also one of the five top add-ons on Radio City for the week of January 8. On the week of February 5, along with "Saturday Nite" by Earth, Wind & Fire, "Soul Cha Cha" by Van McCoy, "Baby I Know" by The Rubettes and a few others etc., Music Week recorded it as a Star Breaker. Two weeks later on the week of February 19, Record Mirror also recorded it as a Star Breaker.

He produced the four-record set, The Messiah by The London Philharmonic Orchestra & Choir that was released on Birdwing BWR-2011 in late 1979. The album featured four soloists. The reviewer called the work awesome and made note of the Christian story being delivered in a new and vibrant way. The executive producer was Billy Ray Hearn. It received the Gospel Music Association's highest award The Dove for outstanding achievement

Martin and Brian Dee contributed the song "Funko" to the TV series The Sweeney which ran from 1975 to 1978.

In 1978, Bruton Music released the Heavy Rock album. Side one had thirteen tracks by Mika Antony and Tom Parker, and Side two had ten tracks by Irving Martin and Brian Dee, and one by Norman Warren.

Martin composed theme music for the late 1970s television series, Return of the Saint. Working with Brian Dee the jazz pianist, a theme for the title sequence was created. The prominent saxophone and synthesizer parts worked in with the animation parts.

Working with Billy Ray Hearn on The Messiah album, released on the Christian Sparrow label in 1979 earned a Dove award.

=== 1980s ===
Martin produced the 1980 John Michael Talbot gospel album The Painter. Talbot was joined by his brother, Terry Talbot, and backed by the London Chamber Orchestra. It was given a positive review by Cash Box in the May 24 issue with the reviewer saying, Super package and super cuts make this a great album.

== Present ==
Presently works as a consultant, mentor, freelance producer and director. Main Areas – D2C, B2C, B2B, Entertainment, TVCs, Infomercials/Spot Ads, Promotions, Podcasts, Edit Producer, Post Production Supervisor, Research/Casting, Conceptual Writer, Music Production.

== Compositions ==
- "We Want Love" sung by Cheryl St. Clair – 1966
- "Death's Other Dominion" (Space: 1999) (co-writer) – (1976)
- "Black Sun" (Space: 1999) (co writer) – (1976)
- "Dance The Night Away" by Sheer Elegance – 1977
- "Earthy" by Monaco – 1978
- "Return of the Saint" (Theme to Return of the Saint) (composer) – 1978

== Discography ==
Singles
Act	Release	Catalogue	Year	Notes
Martin's Magic Sounds	"Mon Amour, Mon Amour" / "Midem Melody"	Deram	1967	
Martin's Magic Sounds / Engelbert Humperdinck	"Mon Amour, Mon Amour" / "Last Waltz"	Decca 45 JB AS. 2, AS. 2	1967	
A. The Mark Duval Big Band, Ensemble Roger Roger B. Irving Martin & Brian Dee	"The Race Machine (The Bobby Hughes Experience Remix)", "Afro Syn (The Bobby Hughes Experience Interlude)" / "Indianapolis 2 (The Bronx Dogs 'Funkanapolis' Mix)"	Strut 12STRUT 008	2001	12-inch 45 rpm

Albums
Act	Release	Catalogue	Year	Notes
Martin's Magic Sounds	Martin's Magic Sounds	Deram SML 1014	1968	
Irving Martin, Brian Dee	Tension Unlimited	Regency Line RL 1036	1975–1976	
Louis Clark, Irving Martin, Brian Dee	Drive / The Living City	Bruton Music BRJ 19	1980	

Appearances
Album title	Credited act	Track(s)	Catalogue	Year	Notes
Music For Dancefloors The Cream Of The Chappell Music Library Sessions	Irving Martin & Brian Dee	"Indianapolis 2", "Deadline Destination"	Strut STRUTLP 010	2001	2LP
