= The Sound Stylistics =

London-based funk band

The Sound Stylistics are a London-based funk band. Their first album, "Deep Funk", was informally released on the Bruton Music label in 2002, becoming highly popular and a "collectors' dream". Its 2007 official release on the Freestyle Records label led to it becoming the number one jazz download in Japan, and receiving positive reviews. It was also one of Freestyle's best-selling albums.

A 7" vinyl, The Players Theme, was reportedly selling for £250, five years after release.

In 2009, they released the album Greasin' the Wheels, also on Freestyle Records. It showed influences of Latin jazz, psychedelic soul and soul jazz.

Their live performances have also been positively reviewed, a 2007 review of a performance at the Jazz Cafe in London describing it as "an awe-inspiringly vibrant display".
