= Life Is Too Short Girl =

1976 song by Sheer Elegance

"Life Is Too Short Girl" is a 1976 single originally recorded by Sheer Elegance. It made various charts that year. It has also been covered by other artists.

== Sheer Elegance version ==
"Life Is Too Short Girl"

Song by Sheer Elegance
- A-side: "Life Is Too Short Girl"
- B-side: "Love Is The Reason Why"
- Released: 1976
- Label: Pye International 7N 25703
- Composer: (Herbert Watkins)
- Producers: Paul Lynton/Paul Grade for P & P Record Production

UK chronology
| "Milky Way" (1975) | "Life Is Too Short Girl" (1976) | "It's Temptation" (1976) |

=== Background ===
"Life Is Too Short Girl" was composed by Herbert Watkins. Working with producers Paul Lynton, Paul Grade and arranger Anthony King, Sheer Elegance recorded the song. Backed with the Dennis Robinson composition, "Love Is the Reason Why", it was released on single, Pye International 7N 25703 in 1976.

=== Reception ===
The record received a positive review in the 29 May 1976 issue of Record World. Pointing out that the group had a continental vocal sound with a steady mid-tempo disco beat, the reviewer also mentioned that the song was already a hit in some countries and should do well in the US.

The song was given a positive spin in the 29 May issue of Cash Box where it was described as a shuffle kind of ballad with drums that keep pushing which resulted in a fine MOR and pop tune. It was also called a very smooth offering which should do well in radio play and sales.

=== Airplay ===
==== Canada ====
As reported in the 12 June issue of RPM Weekly, "Life Is Too Short Girl" was on the playlist of CKLB in Oshawa.

=== UK charts ===
==== Melody Maker ====
"Life Is Too Short Girl" debuted at No. 29 on the Melody Maker Top 30 Singles chart for the week of 17 April 1976. It shared that position with "Convoy" by C. W. McCall.

==== Record Mirror ====
The single peaked at No. 9 on the Record Mirror British Top 50 Singles chart for the week of 8 May.

==== Music Week ====
The single eventually peaked at No. 9 in the UK.

==== Music Week Best Selling Sheet Music ====
The sheet music even made the Music Week Best selling Sheet Music chart and was at No. 15 for the week of 22 May.

=== US charts ===
==== Record World ====
"Life Is Too Short Girl" debuted at No. 137 on the Record World 101 - 150 Singles chart for the week of 19 June. It peaked at No. 130 for the week of 3 July.

== Michael Holm version ==
"Laß dein Herz doch frei"

45 rpm single by Michael Holm
- A-side: "Laß dein Herz doch frei"
- B-side: "Ein großer Garten ist diese Welt"
- Released: 1976
- Label: Ariola 16 955 AT
- Composer: (Watkins/Orig. Watkins/dt. T.: Holm)
- Producer: Michael Holm/Rainer Pietsch

=== Background ===
Michael Holm and Rainer Pietsch produced the single "Laß dein Herz doch frei" which was backed with Ein großer Garten ist diese Welt. It was released in Germany on Ariola 16 955 AT in June 1976.

=== Charts ===
Michael Holm's version of the song spent a week on the German chart, peaking at No. 41.
