= Brian Dee =

- Born: Brian Colin Dee; 21 March 1936 (age 90); London, England
- Genres: Jazz, rock, pop
- Occupations: Musician; Musical director
- Instrument: Piano
- Years active: 1956 – present
- Labels: Bruton, Polydor, Strut

Brian Colin Dee (born 21 March 1936, London, England) is an English jazz pianist and former musical director. He has worked with Irving Martin.

== Career ==
Dee came to prominence in 1959, playing at Ronnie Scott's Jazz Club in Gerrard Street, London. At that time he was playing with Lennie Best, Dave Morse and Vic Ash.

He later joined the Jazz Five and played opposite Miles Davis on a nationwide tour and was voted Melody Maker's 'New Star of 1960'. He also appeared at the Establishment Club in 1962 where his trio played opposite Dudley Moore.

Throughout an uninterrupted career, Dee has played with many jazz musicians, including Ben Webster, Zoot Sims, Al Cohn, Benny Carter, Harry "Sweets" Edison, Eddie "Lockjaw" Davis, Chet Baker, Al Grey, Sonny Stitt, Victor Feldman and Joe Newman.

From the late 1960s onwards, Dee was in demand as a session musician, appearing on many orchestral recordings. Subsequently, he went on to play with the Ted Heath Orchestra, for the last 10 years of its existence under the direction of the late Don Lusher. Dee was also a member of Laurie Johnson's London Big Band.

As an accompanist to singers, Dee has recorded or appeared alongside Bing Crosby, Fred Astaire, Johnny Mercer, Elton John (Dee played organ and/or harmonium on four of John's early albums), Peggy Lee, Frankie Laine, Joe Williams, Jimmy Witherspoon, Mark Murphy, Cleo Laine and Annie Ross.

He was also musical director to Lita Roza, Cilla Black, Rosemary Squires, and Elaine Delmar.

== Work with Irving Martin ==
Dee worked with Irving Martin on the theme for Return of the Saint. The title sequence was created for the show's beginning, and the prominent saxophone and synthesizer parts worked in with the animation parts.

In 1978, the Good Times album that Dee did with Irving Martin was released on Bruton Music BRG 4.

It was noted by The Cornish Times (Friday 18 August 2023) that the track "Funko" that Dee made with Irving Martin was at no. 21 on a recent playlist of Gary Jon's show on NBC Radio.

== Discography ==
Singles
Act	Release	Catalogue	Year	Notes
Brian Dee	he Unforgetable Cole Porter "In The Still Of The Night", "I've Got You Under My Skin" / "Just One of Those Things", "I Get A kick Out of You"	Summit LSE 2065	1965	EP
Brian Dee And Rhythm Combo	The Best Of Jerome Kern "Ol Man River", "Can't Help Loving Dat Man" / "The Folks Who Live on the Hill", "All the Things You Are"	Summit LSE 2066	1965	EP
A. The Mark Duval Big Band, Ensemble Roger Roger B. Irving Martin & Brian Dee	"The Race Machine (The Bobby Hughes Experience Remix)", "Afro Syn (The Bobby Hughes Experience Interlude)" / "Indianapolis 2 (The Bronx Dogs 'Funkanapolis' Mix)"	Strut 12STRUT 008	2001	12-inch 45 rpm single
