= Sounds of Glory =

Studio album by London Philharmonic Choir
- Released: 1976
- Label: Arcade Records ADE P 25
- Producer: Irving Martin

London Philharmonic Choir chronology
Berlioz Te Deum (1976)	Sounds of Glory (1976)	Star Clusters, Nebulae & Places in Devon (1977)

Sounds of Glory was a hit album for The London Philharmonic Choir in 1976. It made it into the UK Top 10 album chart.

== Background ==
Following on from their previous album, Berlioz Te Deum, this album was conducted by John Alldis. The album and was Produced by Irving Martin. It was released in the UK on Arcade Records ADE P 25 in 1976. It was followed up with Star Clusters, Nebulae & Places in Devon which was released in 1977.

== Charts ==
The record first entered the chart on 13 November 1976. By 25 December, in its seventh week on the Music Week Top Albums chart, it was at no. 20. It peaked at no. 10 and spent a total of ten weeks in the chart. It made another brief chart appearance and was at no. 50 for a week on 29 January 1977.

== Track listing ==
1. Pomp and Circumstance March
2. Zadok the Priest
3. Bridal Chorus
4. Londonderry Air
5. The Holy City
6. All People on Earth Do Well
7. Battle Hymn of the Republic
8. Rock of Ages
9. Eternal Father Strong to Save
10. Onward Christian Soldiers
11. Jerusalem
12. Rule Britannia
13. God That Madest Earth and Heaven
14. O God Our Help in Ages Past
15. Parise My Soul the King of Heaven
16. Brother James' Air
17. Abide with Me
18. O for the Wings of a Dove
19. For Unto Us a Child Is Born
20. The Hallelujah Chorus
