= Sheer Elegance =

British pop/soul trio

- Origin: United Kingdom
- Genres: Soul
- Years active: 1975–1978
- Label: Pye
- Past members: Dennis Robinson; Bev Gordon; Herbie Watkins

Sheer Elegance was a British pop/soul trio, comprising Dennis Robinson, Bev Gordon (ex-Earthquake, aka Little Henry) and Herbie Watkins, who appeared on the British television talent show New Faces in 1975. Their most successful song was "Life Is Too Short Girl" which reached No. 9 in the UK chart.

== Background ==
The group had the distinction of writing their own material. During the course of their career, they appeared on New Faces, supported The Supremes when the group came to the UK and in aid of the Migraine Trust, they performed for Princess Margaret at the London Palladium.

They recorded for the Pye label.

== Career ==
Their first single, "Going Downtown", was a flop, but their second single, "Milky Way", reached number 18 in the UK Singles Chart early in 1976.

The group had a follow-up single released in 1976. It was "Life Is Too Short Girl". It was more successful than the previous, reaching number 9 and spending nine weeks in the chart.

Their final national hit was "It's Temptation" which reached number 41 in 1976.

The group released "Dance the Night Away" in 1977. It was written by Irving Martin, J. Vincent Edwards and Bev Gordon. Backed with "Don't Wanna Miss My Bus", it was released on Pye 7N 25734 in early 1977. It did get airplay with spins on Piccadilly Radio. It was also one of the five top add-ons on Radio City for the week of January 8. On the week of February 5, along with "Saturday Nite" by Earth, Wind & Fire, "Soul Cha Cha" by Van McCoy, "Baby I Know" by The Rubettes and a few others etc., Music Week recorded it as a Star Breaker. Two weeks later Record Mirror also recorded it as a Star Breaker. In spite of this, it failed to chart nationally.

Their only album was titled Sheer Elegance.

== Discography ==
=== Albums ===
- Sheer Elegance (ABC Records, 1976)

=== Singles ===
Year	Song	UK
1975	"Going Downtown"	—
1975	"Milky Way"	18
1976	"Life Is Too Short Girl"	9
1976	"It's Temptation"	41
1976	"I'll Find You Where You Are"	—
1977	"Dance the Night Away"	—
1978	"It's How You Use Me Girl"	—
"—" denotes releases that did not chart.
