= James Southwell =

James Southwell (born 1 July 1988) is an Australian guitar player, singer, songwriter. In addition to his releases, he has toured Australia and New Zealand extensively from 2006 playing in excess of 2000 shows, including many festival appearances.

== Biography ==
=== Early life ===
Born in Yass, New South Wales and raised in Bowning, New South Wales, James Southwell is the son of Penelope Gooding & Tony Southwell. James has four sisters (Natalie, Kate, Shelby and Daytona) and one brother (Craig). Southwell first became interested in playing guitar when he received one for Christmas when he was seven years old from his mother & father and his uncle, Rick Gooding. James now lives in Canberra, ACT with his wife Alanna, and daughters Magnolia & Lenora.

=== Musical career ===
Southwell left school in 2005 to pursue his dream of being a full-time guitar player. His first album, Dark Angel, was recorded at Kevin Borich's studio in December 2005. Mark Kennedy on drums, Harry Brus on bass and Borich played on Dark Angel as well as Phil Emmanuel & Mal Eastick, who both featured on the cover of Stevie Wright’s "Guitar Band" along with Southwell and Borich. Dark Angel was successful for Southwell which resulted in a 76 show tour with Kennedy and Brus. Since the release of Dark Angel, Southwell has been in constant demand at music venues and festivals. He has had five more releases since Dark Angel, James Southwell & the Fallen Angels, Pieces of James, James Southwell Band live at the Sydney Blues & Roots festival DVD, the "Walkin' Now" single, and his 2017 release, "Where The Wind Blows - The Dockside Sessions.

=== Influences ===
Kevin Borich, Phil Manning, Lobby Loyde, George Harrison, Geoff Achison, John Lennon, Stevie Ray Vaughan, Mal Eastick, Johnny Lang.

=== Festival appearances ===
- Australian Blues Festival 2008
- Canberra Festival 2009
- Summernats 21 2008
- Yass Heritage Festival 2009
- Yass Festival 2006, 2007, 2008, 2009,
- Australian Music Extravaganza 2010
- Blues On Broadbeach 2006, 2007, 2009, 2011,
- Blues Music Day Wollongong Blues Club 2015
- Great Southern Blues & Rockabilly Festival 2009, 2015
- Redlands-Bayside Blues Festival October 2014.
- Blues at the Briars January 2015.
- Agnes Water Blues & Rock Festival Feb 2015.
- Airlie Beach Music Festival November 2015.
- Thredbo Blues Festival 2008, 2009, 2010, 2016, 2017
- Bay of Islands Jazz & Blues Festival New Zealand 2008, 2015, 2016, 2019
- Sydney Blues & Roots Festival 2009, 2011, 2014, 2015, 2016
- Wangaratta Jazz & Blues Festival 2015, 2016
- Untapped Festival 2018, 2019
- Red, White, Amber & Blues Festival 2019
- Goulburn Blues Festival 2022
- Thredbo Blues Festival 2024
- Blues on the Bayou (Distillery Road Market) 2025
- Thredbo Blues Festival 2025
- Goulburn Blues Festival 2026
- Cronulla Jazz & Blues Festival 2026
- Belconnen Blues Festival 2026

=== Side projects ===
James toured with acclaimed Australian blues band the Bondi Cigars from late 2024 into 2025, filling in for their front man Shane Pacey while he was out getting surgery. Southwell also toured with Australian rock icon Angry Anderson (Ex Rose Tattoo) for 10+ years as "Angry Anderson with the James Southwell Band". He has a popular festival band, "Manning (Phil Manning) Wilson (Chris Wilson) Southwell (James Southwell) Band" He has also toured with Australian idol winner Kate DeAraugo. He has played with Kevin Borich, Phil Manning, Chris Wilson, Lachlan Doley, and a host of well known Australian musicians. His latest project teams him up with the New Orleans bass player Charlie Wooton, as the "James Southwell Band featuring Charlie Wooton"

=== Latest recording ===
Southwell traveled to Maurice Louisiana in June 2016 to record a new original album at the famed Dockside Studio. Charlie Wooton produced and plays bass on this recording, with Doug Belote on drums, Michael Lemmler on keys, Jason Ricci on harmonica/vocals, Rafael Pereira on percussion, Jamison Ross on backing vocals. Paul Wooton on backing vocals, Andrew Gregory on clapping, Dave Farrell engineer. This album is set to be released in late 2016.

== Discography ==
- 2006 Dark Angel
- 2009 James Southwell & the Fallen Angels
- 2013 Pieces of James
- 2015 Walkin' Now (Single)
- 2015 James Southwell Band "Live" at the 2014 Sydney Blues & Roots Festival DVD
- 2016 James Southwell Band "Live" at the 2016 Thredbo Blues Festival DVD
- 2016 James Southwell Band "Live" at the 2016 Thredbo Blues Festival CD
- 2017 Where The Wind Blows, The Dockside Sessions

== Music videos ==
- James Southwell, "Guitar Band" 2006
- James Southwell & Barry Harvey, "Beast of Burden" 2013
- James Southwell Band, "Wild Thing" 2014
- James Southwell Band, "I can Tell" 2014
- James Southwell, "Walkin' Now" 2015
- James Southwell Band featuring Charlie Wooton 2015
