= Junior grade =

A junior grade is a subdivision of a military rank, lower than the corresponding rank without that qualification.

In the U.S. armed forces, the Army formerly appointed warrant officers (junior grade), and the Navy's lieutenants, junior grade, are commissioned officers.
