= Dale Barlow =

Australian jazz saxophonist, flutist and composer

Dale Barlow (born Sydney, Australia, 25 December 1959) is a jazz saxophonist, flute player and composer. He has a Masters of Music degree begun at City College New York under Ron Carter and completed at ANU Canberra. He has received ARIA Awards, Album of the Year/ Jazz performer of the year/ International Artist of the Year/ Bicentennial Artist of the Year, four Mo Awards and grants.

== Career ==
Barlow briefly studied at the Sydney Conservatorium of Music in the late 1970s.

In the early 1980s Barlow moved to New York, where he was a member of two groups, the Cedar Walton Quartet and Art Blakey's Jazz Messengers. He studied saxophone with George Coleman and Dave Liebman, piano with Barry Harris, and Hal Galper, and won a BMI scholarship to study at the "Jazz composers workshop" with Bob Brookmeyer and Manny Album.

Barlow has also toured and recorded with many other jazz greats including Sonny Stitt, Chet Baker, Gil Evans, Jackie McLean, Billy Cobham, Dizzy Gillespie, Curtis Fuller, Eddie Palmieri, Benny Golson, Lee Konitz, Helen Merrill, Mulgrew Miller, Kenny Barron, Ray Drummond, Dave Kikoski, Richie Cole, Dizzy Gillespie, Billy Higgins, Freddie Hubbard and Wynton Marsalis, Cindy Blackman, Ernie Watts, Eddie Henderson, Jeff Watts, Essiet Essiet, Bennie Green and Mike Nock. He played with the Gil Evans' Big Band, and was a member of the Billy Cobham band for 3 years.

Dale also was a part of the English Jazz scene for some years where he performed at Ronnie Scotts many times as a part of Ronnies' band, as well as his own units, and was a composer and member of the original 'Loose Tubes Big Band'. He was in Stan Traceys' Group, Gordon Becks' Quintet, and performed with Kenny Wheeler and Django Bates, He recorded and performed with numerous pop artists while in England including- Wham, Style Council, Sting, Ian Dury.

In Australia and SEAsia he has performed with many artists and groups, including Keys Music Association, The Benders, Bruce Cale, Roger Frampton, Vince Jones, Matt Finish, Margaret Urlich, Kate Ceberano, Indra Lesmana, and Dwiki Dharmawan. Dale's group 'The Wizards of Oz' with Paul Grabowsky, Lloyd Swanton and Tony Buck, was the first Australian group to undertake a major 2 continent tour (USA/Canada/Europe) with assistance from the Australia Council for the Arts.

== Discography ==
=== As leader or co-leader ===
List of albums with details
Title	Album details
Bluesville Time (Cedar Walton Quartet with Dale Barlow, David Williams & Billy Higgins)	Released: 1985; Format: LP, Cassette, CD; Label: Criss Cross Jazz
Horn	Released: 1990; Format: CD; Label: Spiral Scratch
Hipnotation	Released: 1991; Format: CD; Label: Spiral Scratch
Dale Barlow	Released: 1995; Format: CD; Label: ABC Music
Playground	Released: 1997; Format: CD; Label: EMI Music
Made By Mates (Victor De Boo with Dale Barlow & Scott Tinkler)	Released: 1998; Format: CD; Label: Disckus Records
Manhattan After Hours (Cedar Walton Trio & Dale Barlow, Dave Williams, Billy Higgins)	Released: 1999; Format: CD; Label: Twinz Records
Dale Barlow Live	Released: August 2002; Format: CD; Label: Jazz Head
Treat Me Gently (with George Coleman Jr, Mark Fitzgibbon & Sam Anning)	Released: November 2008; Format: CD, download; Label: Jazz Head
Flute Hoot (with John Harkins, Brandi Disterheft & Joe Farnsworth)	Released: 2018; Format: CD, download, streaming; Label: Hip Notation

=== As sideman ===
- Art Blakey, Chippin' In (Timeless, 1990)
- Art Blakey, One for All (A&M, 1990)
- Bruce Cale, Live at the Basement Vol. One Rolling Thunder (Modern, 1987)
- Bruce Cale, Live at the Basement Vol. Two Rain (Vista, 1987)
- Bruce Cale, On Fire (Tall Poppies, 2008)
- Carl Orr, Mean It (Spiral Scratch, 1993)
- Dog Trumpet, Antisocial Tendencies (Half a Cow, 2007)
- Guy Barker, Timeswing (Verve, 1996)
- Joe Lane, The Arrival (Spiral Scratch, 1994)
- Kate Ceberano, Kate Ceberano & Friends (Mushroom, 1994)
- Matt Moffitt, As Little as a Look (CBS, 1986)
- Mental As Anything, Mouth to Mouth (CBS, 1987)
- Mezzoforte, Rising (Steinar, 1984)
- Mezzoforte, This Is the Night (Steinar, 1984)
- Paul Grabowsky, Tee Vee (EastWest, 1992)
- Peter O'Mara, Peter O'Mara (Battyman, 1980)
- Ten Part Invention, Ten Part Invention (ABC Records, 1990)
- Ute, Free to Be...Free to Breathe (33 Records, 1992)
- Vince Jones, One Day Spent (EMI, 1990)
- Vince Jones, Future Girl (EMI, 1992)

== Awards and nominations ==
=== ARIA Awards ===
The ARIA Music Awards are presented annually since 1987 by the Australian Recording Industry Association (ARIA). Barlow has won one award from four nominations.

Year	Nominee / work	Award	Result	Ref.
1991	Horn	Best Jazz Album	Nominated	
1992	Hipnotation	Best Jazz Album	Won	
2002	Dale Barlow Live	Best Jazz Album	Nominated	
2009	Treat Me Gently (with George Coleman Jr, Mark Fitzgibbon & Sam Anning)	Best Jazz Album	Nominated	

=== Mo Awards ===
The Australian Entertainment Mo Awards (commonly known informally as the Mo Awards), were annual Australian entertainment industry awards. They recognise achievements in live entertainment in Australia from 1975 to 2016. Dale Barlow won four awards in that time.

Year	Nominee / work	Award	Result (wins only)
1991	Dale Barlow	Jazz Performer of the Year	Won
1991	Dale Barlow	Jazz Performer of the Year (Male)	Won
1992	Dale Barlow	Jazz Performer of the Year (Male)	Won
1993	Dale Barlow	Jazz Instrumental Performer of the Year	Won
