= John Alldis =

English chorus-master and conductor

John Alldis (10 August 1929 – 20 December 2010) was an English chorus-master and conductor.

== Biography ==
Alldis was educated at King's College School, Cambridge and Felsted. He then returned to King's College, Cambridge as a choral scholar under Boris Ord from 1949 to 1952.

After leaving Cambridge University, Alldis quickly became highly regarded as a choral conductor. In 1966, the London Symphony Orchestra engaged him to form and direct its first standing choral group. However, he switched to the London Philharmonic Choir in 1969, with which he remained until 1982, preparing choruses for many celebrated performances with Adrian Boult, Otto Klemperer, Leopold Stokowski, Colin Davis, Bernard Haitink, Karl Richter, Georg Solti, and Zubin Mehta.

In 1962, Alldis founded the professional, 16-member John Alldis Choir, which launched itself with the world premiere of Alexander Goehr's A Little Cantata of Proverbs. Contemporary music figured importantly in its repertory, with first performances of works by Malcolm Williamson, Richard Rodney Bennett and Harrison Birtwistle, many of which were captured on the Argo label. In 1967, he prepared the John Alldis Choir for the first European performance of Stravinsky's Requiem Canticles, conducted by Pierre Boulez. The choir's 1972 recording of Justin Connolly's Verse, Op. 7b, was re-released in 2008 on the Lyrita label. The choir also participated in many opera recordings for Decca and RCA, featuring artists such as Luciano Pavarotti, Plácido Domingo, Janet Baker, Joan Sutherland and Kiri Te Kanawa.

In 1970, Alldis directed his choir in the recording and the first performance of Pink Floyd's prog rock suite "Atom Heart Mother". In 1973, he directed the choir in the Westminster Abbey performance of Duke Ellington's Third Sacred Concert—a recording that was to be the penultimate one made by the great bandleader. He also conducted the London Philharmonic Choir and brass section in the recording of David Bedford's Star Clusters, available on the Classicprint label. In 1977, he recorded Sounds of Glory for Arcade Records, a celebration of choral classics, which won a gold disc.

Alldis conducted a number of other ensembles, in music ranging from the Renaissance to the present. From 1966 to 1979, he led the choir of the Guildhall School of Music and Drama. From 1971 to 1977, he served as joint chief conductor of Radio Denmark, mainly leading its Danish State Radio Chorus. From 1979 to 1983, he conducted the Groupe Vocal de France, recording music by Francis Poulenc and Gabriel Fauré. From 1989 to 1990, he was music director and consultant for the Cameran Singers in Israel and briefly became guest conductor of the Hallé Choir in Manchester. From 1978 to 1987, he conducted the American Choral Symposium in Manhattan, Kansas. From 1985 to 1998, he was a permanent guest conductor with the Netherlands Chamber Choir, with whom he made several CDs including English Choral Music on the Globe label. From 1989 to 1997, he guest-conducted the Tokyo Philharmonic Chorus and the Central Philharmonic Society of China in Beijing. In 2002, he conducted the Lyon Opera in the first performance of Messa Sulenna by the Corsican composer Jean-Paul Poletti. From 1975 to 2003, John Alldis served on the Ralph Vaughan Williams Trust, and from 1971 to 2004 he conducted the Wimbledon Symphony Orchestra.

Alldis won Grammy Awards for his work with Sir Adrian Boult and Sir Georg Solti, was an Honorary Fellow of Westminster Choir College, Princeton, and in 1994 was named a Chevalier de L'Ordre des Arts et des Lettres. He was married to the violinist and teacher Ursula Alldis, and had two sons, the jazz pianist Dominic Alldis and Robert.
