= Dance the Night Away (Sheer Elegance song) =

Song by Sheer Elegance
- A-side: "Dance the Night Away"
- B-side: "Don't Wanna Miss My Bus"
- Released: 1977
- Label: Pye International Pye International 7N 25734
- Composers: (V. Edwards, Martin)
- Producers: Paul Lynton & Paul Grade

Sheer Elegance singles chronology
"I'll Find You Where You Are" (1976)	"Dance the Night Away" (1977)	"It's How You Use Me Girl" (1978)

"Dance the Night Away" is a 1977 song by UK recording act Sheer Elegance. It was performed on Top of the Pops and was a bubbling under hit for the group that year.

== Background ==
Sheer Elegance released "Dance the Night Away" in January 1977. It was written by Irving Martin, J. Vincent Edwards and Bev Gordon. Backed with "Don't Wanna Miss My Bus", it was released on Pye 7N 25734 in early 1977. The song was picked up very early by Top of the Pops and a mimed performance was broadcast on 6 January 1977.

The single "Dance the Night Away" bw "I'll Give You My Love" was released in Germany on Hansa International 17 719 AT in March 1977.

The song is included on European compilations that were released in 1977; 13 Original Hits from Radio & T.V. on Pilips 6436 073, 18 Smash Hits on Pye NSPL 28227, 20 Super Disco Dynamites on Hansa 28 877 GT, and Big Deal on Precision ZCBGD 1.

== Reception ==
"Dance the Night Away" was given a three-star rating by Barbara Carthouse in the 22 January 1977 issue of Record Mirror. She wrote that the song wasn't as instantly recognizable as the group's previous singles, but it was already picked up by Top of the Pops and that gave it more than a fair chance.

== Airplay ==
As per the 8 January issue of Music Week, "Dance the Night Away" was being played at Piccadilly Radio, and was a Top Add On at Radio City.

== Charts ==
=== New Musical Express ===
As recorded in the 1 January 1977 issue of New Musical Express, Sheer Elegance was sharing the No. 87 position with the Shangri Las at 109 chart points.

=== Music Week ===
For the week of 5 February, along with "Saturday Nite" by Earth, Wind & Fire, "Soul Cha Cha" by Van McCoy, "Baby I Know" by The Rubettes and a few others etc., Music Week recorded "Dance the Night Away" as a Star Breaker. A fortnight later, "Dance the Night Away" was again a Music Week Star Breaker.

=== Record Mirror ===
For the week of 19 February, Record Mirror also recorded it as a Star Breaker.
