= By Heart (Matt Finish album) =

Studio album by Matt Finish
- Released: 1993
- Genre: Rock
- Label: BMG
- Producer: Peter Dawkins

Matt Finish chronology
Word of Mouth (1984)	By Heart (1993)

By Heart is the third studio album by Australian band Matt Finish. The album produced the singles "Blue" and "Earthbound (Don't Sing for Me)".

== Track listing ==
1. "Blue"
2. "Earthbound (Don't Sing for Me)"
3. "Understand"
4. "I Could Tell You I Cried"
5. "Magic"
6. "By Heart"
7. "Love in Demand"
8. "Need You Near Me"
9. "Silence"
10. "In My Dreams"

== Personnel ==
- Matt Moffitt – vocals, guitar
- Paul Dawkins – keyboards, vocals
- Rohan Cannon – guitar, vocals
- Bobby Christian – bass
- Adrian Cannon – drums
