= John Prior (musician) =

Australian musician, composer and producer

- Born: John David Prior; 22 July 1960 (age 66); Sydney
- Genres: Rock, progressive rock, fusion, funk, soul, reggae, blues, orchestral, world, electronica
- Occupations: musician, composer, producer, graphic artist, promoter
- Instruments: drums, piano, synthesizer, guitar, bass guitar, percussion, ocarina, computer
- Years active: 1968–present
- Labels: Giant Records, CBS Records, Bruton Music, Zomba Music, Universal Music Group, ABC Records, Sony Music, EMI Records, MGM Distribution, Mammal Music, Unreal Music.

John David Prior is an Australian musician, composer and producer recognized for his work with Matt Finish, Adrian Belew (King Crimson), Mick Taylor (The Rolling Stones), Roy Buchanan, Champion Jack Dupree, New Theatre, Coca-Cola, The Great Outdoors, Iota, Wicked Beat Sound System, Kevin Borich and Dale Barlow.

Sydney Morning Herald reviewer John Shand wrote: "Prior was a nexus of energy, fun and accuracy" performing with Adrian Belew.

John is the owner and director of Mammal Music Pty Ltd audio/video production company, and Unity Gain Studios, where he has composed and produced albums for many independent artists including the ARIA Award winning Tibetan Prayer (Best World/Traditional/Folk Album 1995), ARIA Award nominated The Hipbone Connection (Best Independent Album 2000 and No. 1 on the Australian Independent Record Labels Association (AIR) charts) and ARIA Award nominated The Story of Abbey (Best Show/Cast Album 2002).

He has also produced a number of works for film, television, theatre and advertising, gaining an Australian Guild of Screen Composers Nomination for orchestral composition and production.

== Musical history ==
=== 1970s ===
Prior started playing guitar aged eight, drums at 11, vibraphone at 17 and piano at 24. During his teens, he performed in the bands Mandrake and Legend with brother Rob Prior (guitar/vocals) and neighbor Paul Williams (bass guitar) at the Mosman Spastic Centre, The Kirribilli Hotel, and his school, Sydney Boys High School. With the addition of keyboards player Chris Short and the name change to Conic Section, they composed original jazz-rock fusion, performed at the Limerick Castle Hotel and won the Festival Of Pop band competition at Flemington Sydney in 1974 and a 2SM song competition in 1975. The band TAPP, comprising John and Rob Prior, Peter Astley (bass guitar), Geoff Taylor (keyboards) and Peter Noakes (vocals) recorded at Wirra Willa Studios, Glenfield.

At 16, he played drums with Stevie Wright (Easybeats), Sea of Clouds, Atlantis, the Northbridge Jazz Band and formed experimental funk band Hot Dogma with Craig Learmont (guitar, The Layabouts, Klezma Orcheztra), Peter Astley (bass), Anthony Smith (keyboards, Flowers, Icehouse) and Peter Noakes (vocals).

In 1979, Prior formed Matt Finish with singer/guitarist Matt Moffitt and through to the end of the seventies, they played regular residencies in clubs and pubs around Sydney every night of the week, often double-gigging on weekends. In November 1979, a few months after forming, radio station 2JJ broadcast Matt Finish live-to-air from the Civic Hotel in Pitt Street, Sydney and continued to broadcast the raw live performances for a year.

=== 1980s ===
During the eighties, Matt Finish was one of Australia's most popular live bands performing thousands of live shows to millions of people including national tours with U2, XTC, Midnight Oil, INXS, The Ramones, Split Enz, Cold Chisel, Bryan Ferry and The B-52's.

Matt Finish released Matt Finish Play Africa (single 1980), Short Note (album 1981), Fade Away (EP 1981), Matt Finish (EP 1983), Word of Mouth (album 1983) and numerous singles. The Short Note album was re-released on CD in 1989 and is still available from music shops.

In 1985, Prior travelled to London and Brussels to record the Matt Moffitt solo album By As Little As A Look with producer Nicky Graham (David Bowie, CBS A&R Manager). While in London, he continued studying piano and music theory with Peter Sanders (London Symphony Orchestra) and electronic music using computers, synthesizers and samplers at CBS Studios London and Fairlight CMI's studios in Sydney.

During the late eighties, Prior toured Australia as drummer with Roy Buchanan, Champion Jack Dupree, Mal Eastick, Girl Overboard, Troy Newman, Jackie Orszaczky, Guy Le Claire, Stephanie Howell, Baby Loves To Cha-Cha, Getaway Plane, T-Vibes, Bastiaan, Bob Armstrong and Charlie McMahon; recorded Land Of The Living with Mark Edwards; performed drums with Rob Hirst (Midnight Oil) and hundreds of other drummers and percussionists at Bondi Pavilion; performed solo at the first Australian Music Day Concert; performed each year at the Sydney, Melbourne & Brisbane Music Trade Fairs; conducted drum clinics and music clinics in music shops around Australia sponsored by Australis Music, Tama Drums, Akai Samplers, Dynamic Music and Sabian Cymbals; taught drums at Drum City Sydney and Emmanuel School Randwick; composed music for productions at Sydney's Ensemble Theatre, Nimrod Theatre, Griffin Theatre, New Theatre (Newtown) and Belvoir St Theatre; and produced local independent artists including Megan Williams, One Franc, Sandi Chick, Amanda Mann and Guy Le Claire.

In 1989, Prior travelled to New York to produce Matt Moffitt and Jennifer Barrett and perform with Pacific Orchestra

=== 1990s ===
In 1990, Moffitt and Prior reformed Matt Finish with Matt Moffitt, former Eurogliders members Guy Le Claire (guitar) and Lindsay Jehan (bass), and New Yorker Jennifer Barrett (guitar). Managed and promoted by Prior, the band completed their most successful tour to date including fifty sold-out performances around Australia. The band recorded four songs at Studios 301 and Bondi Road Studios that were released in 2009 on the album Kite on a Hurricane Day.

He also performed live with Olivia Newton-John, Crunch, Monkey Principle, Mick Taylor from the Rolling Stones and Alex Lloyd.

In 1992, he formed Mammal Music production company, incorporated in 1994, and built Unity Gain Studios audio and video production facilities in Erskineville in 1997.

During this period, John composed and produced several production music albums for Bruton Music UK and albums for local independent artists including ARIA Award winner Tibetan Prayer with Yungchen Lhamo featuring Tibetan Monks from Namgyal Monastery (Best World/Traditional/Folk Album 1995) and the ARIA Award nominated The Hipbone Connection with iOTA (Best Independent Album 2000 and No. 1 on the Australian Independent Record Labels Association (AIR) Charts), which spawned 6 charting singles.

He also composed and produced music, dialogue and sound effects for film, television, theater and advertising including soundtracks for MTV, The World Around Us, AFTRS, Australian Federal Government, NSW Tourism, Australia Today Indonesia Tomorrow, Jesus Christ Superstar, feature film This Won't Hurt A Bit, award-winning short film The Red Dress, The Great Outdoors, Paradise Beach, Art of Stone, Barnardos, Coca-Cola, McDonald's, KFC, Levi's, Sun Alliance, Sky-Garden, Andronicus, Toyota, Slazenger, Buttercup, Just Jeans, Frutti, Hi-C, Milo, Sydney Turf Club, Deloitte, BA Insurance and Price Waterhouse.

=== 2000s ===
During 2001, Prior traveled to Europe and the US to attend numerous music festivals. Back in Australia, he produced the jazz/fusion album Day And Night with Bob Spencer's band Eclection before forming the experimental electronic project Ear Candy, with jazz saxophonist Dale Barlow, singer Wendy Dorsett and her son Kayci, producing the underground dance hits Made in Australia, Feels Like Summer and Candy For Your Soul.

In 2002, he co-composed, arranged and produced the ARIA Award nominated rock opera The Story of Abbey (Best Show/Cast Album 2002), which also had a successful theatrical run at the Sydney Seymour Centre, and produced the album The Need To Fall with rock band Merge.

In 2003, he produced Leave Nothing Untouched with dance troupe Astral Taxi and composed 20 albums of commercial library music that appeared in soundtracks around the world.

In 2004, he composed an orchestral score for the Deloitte advertising campaign Out For Glory and formed the world/fusion band Newtown Beats with Eddie Quansah (Osibisa, Bob Marley, King Cobra).

In 2005, he produced jazz vocalist Jennifer Whatson's debut self-titled album and composed an orchestral score for New Theatre's production of the Spike Milligan play Badjelly the Witch, which ran in January 2006 and January 2007.

In 2006, he composed and produced an orchestral score for the short film A Fairytale of the City featuring Sam Worthington, produced recordings with Newtown Beats, Robot Productions, guitarist Bob Spencer and singer Meryl Leppard, performed live with Sydney bands Newtown Beats, The Lovely Sons and Swing Thing; and toured Australia with King Crimson singer/guitarist Adrian Belew and bassist Al Slavik. Their first performance was at Byron Bay Bluesfest (East Coast Blues & Roots Music Festival) for 75,000 people. John and Rob Prior promoted further shows with Adrian at the Basement in Sydney and Manchester Lane in Melbourne.

In November 2006, he produced the Matt Finish single Don't Fade Away with singer/guitarist Luke Dixon, bassist Matt Cornell and sound engineer Greg Clarke; directed, edited and promoted the accompanying video clip; and in December 2006, John and his brother Rob promoted Matt Finish's Matt Moffitt Memorial Tour featuring Dixon, Cornell, Clayton and a guest performance by Rick Grossman.

During 2007, he managed, promoted and performed on a 35-show Matt Finish tour featuring vocalist David Adams, bassist Harry Brus and a number of guest guitarists including Guy Le Claire, Eliot Reynolds, Steve Edmonds, Les Rankin and Kevin Borich and Dale Barlow. While touring, Prior also promoted and performed a number of music clinics and workshops at music stores around Australia in association with sponsors Australis Music, Allans Music, Tama and Sabian cymbals, including a performance at the Sydney Guitar Show featuring Kevin Borich and Steve Edmonds. In December 2007, he produced the Matt Finish album 1978 - 2008, released January 2008.

During 2008, he produced Steve Lockyer's debut Sticks & Stones and David Kingdom's Tattoo, and managed a Matt Finish tour with special guest musicians Dale Barlow and Guy Le Claire, both childhood friends. In December 2008, he directed, edited and produced a video clip for the Matt Finish song Short Note from archival footage.

In January 2009, Prior edited, produced and authored the Matt Finish DVD Live at the Musicians Club 1981 with the only existing concert video of Matt Finish in the eighties. In February 2009, he produced the Matt Finish EP New Frontier featuring singer David Adams and collated and remastered an extensive collection of Matt Finish recordings that were released in December 2009 as the Matt Finish Flight Case, a 12-disc box-set including a book and posters. The band performed more than 30 shows around the country during the year. He also produced the albums The Shaggers with The Shaggers and The Cat, The Fiddle & This Tune with Sameera Bashir.

In 2010, Prior composed, produced and released an album of original Arabic music entitled The Red Sea, produced an album of Russian folk music with Sydney composer and pianist Tatyana, and performed drums live with Matt Finish, Newtown Beats, JFK, The Erskinevillains, Bulli Lama, The Swingers, Ray Husband's band and Mysterious Travellers, a tribute to Weather Report featuring acclaimed jazz musicians Dale Barlow (sax), Bill Risby (piano), Phil Scorgie (bass), Fabian Hevia and David Fester (percussion).

In 2011, he formed the band Stone and the Sky with Swedish vocalist Pontus Duvsjo, which recorded and performed a number of live shows including a benefit concert that raised $50,000 for the Prince of Wales Foundation. He produced the album Nowhere To Hide with vocalist Peter Colleer's band The Unnamed Sources.

In February 2012, he promoted a tour with Matt Finish and a series of performances at the Marrickville Bowling & Recreation Club entitled The Do featuring local soul and groove artists. A percentage of ticket sales was donated to local charity Father Dave's Youth Centre.

During 2012 and 2013, he produced albums at his studio, Unity Gain Studios Erskineville, with Sophie Von, Ray Husband, Love Child, The Inner West, The Ians and Peter Colleer; plus the single Bass Straight with Gordon Trott.

Between 2014 and 2018, Prior produced and played on albums and soundtracks for Farooq Haider, Love Child, Deloitte Australia, Sacred Cow, Heavily Made Up Boy, Shanghaied Project, Warren McLean from Divinyls, Placebo Cure, Magnus, Trevor Rowe, Music Box, Ray Husband, Travis Masters, Samantha Cartwright, Paul Kougias, Eddie Brown, Jacquie McGill, Martin Nickson, The Final Word, Craig Leermont, Mi-Sex guitarist Kevin Stanton and The Good Life. During that time he also performed live with Ray Husband, Matt Finish and Oz Rock Roadshow featuring special guests Mark Gable from Choirboys, Angry Anderson from Rose Tattoo, Steve Mulry from Ted Mulry Gang, Mick Peeling from Stars and Bob Spencer from Skyhooks and The Angels.

Between 2017 and 2020, Prior taught music and produced student recordings at Dulwich High School of Visual Arts and Design sponsored by Canterbury Hurlstone Park RSL Club; and Matt Finish performed at 'Sunset Sounds', 'Classic Hits' and 'Pure Gold' shows for Empire Touring, featuring other popular Australian artists such as Ian Moss, Eurogliders, The Models, Jon Stevens, Dragon, Radiators, Ross Wilson, Mi-Sex, Real Life, Wendy Matthews and GANGgajang, with sold-out shows at Enmore Theatre Sydney, WIN Entertainment Centre Wollongong, Sandstone Point, Wagga Racecourse, Gosford Racecourse, Roche Estate Hunter Valley, and Australia Day Parramatta Park in Sydney with 20,000 people.

Between 2020 and 2022, during the pandemic, Prior composed and produced theme music for PayPal Brazil, produced albums for independent Australian artists Peter Colleer, Ethelated Spirits, Travis Masters, Sophie Von, Anita Monk, Coast Collective, Seven, Aegean Quartet and Peter Fenwick, and produced and played drums on the song When I See You Dancing by Steve Williams from Wa Wa Nee, Jon Lord and Matt Finish featuring vocalist John Kenny from Rockmelons.

== Associations ==
In 2012, Prior co-formed The Association of Australian Musicians (AM) and The Australian Independent Musicians Association (AIMA), an online forum for Australian musicians managed by AM, with more than 12,000 members in 2022. AM and AIMA members have developed The Australian Music Plan proposing a range of music industry reforms.

In 2014, Prior became a co-founder and active member of the Australian Performing Rights Association (APRA) Resolution Pathways Dispute Resolution Committee, APRA Writer Members Sub-Committee and APRA Peer Review Committee, developing a peer review system for more than 100,000 APRA members to seek advice and resolve disputes, winning the Australian Disputes Centre's ADR Corporate Team of the Year award in 2016 for innovative dispute resolution. In March 2020, at the start of the pandemic, John resigned from all APRA committees.

== Legal issues ==
In 1995, Prior won an Expert Determination commissioned by APRA and conducted by Davis Catterns QC regarding authorship of the theme and underscore music for the television series Great Outdoors created in 1992.

In 2000, John won Prior v Sheldon & Artec Sound Vision in the Federal Court regarding authorship of the theme and underscore for Great Outdoors after eight years of dispute.

From 2010 to 2020, no-win-no-fee lawyers sued Prior thrice consecutively regarding property and copyright ownership in the Federal and Supreme Courts of Australia, all of which he won. On 25 March 2019, during the Supreme Court case, John's solicitor and friend Christopher John Boyd died at The Gap in Watson's Bay Sydney. On April 5, 2019, Boyd's favourite song, "Short Note", was played at his funeral at St Joan of Arc Church Haberfield.

In 2018, an APRA Peer Review Panel of APRA Writer Members upheld claims by Rick Grossman, Jeff Clayton and Prior regarding authorship of Matt Finish songs.

In 2022 Prior won two disputes at the NSW Civil and Administrative Tribunal (NCAT) regarding equipment sales.

Prior has also won seven District Court cases brought by South Sydney Council regarding parking outside his studio and residence.

A dispute regarding claims by Matt Finish members of copyright infringement of Matt Finish works by Universal Music, Sony Music, Warner Music, Origin Music Publishing, MCA Music, Mushroom Music, APRA and AMCOS continues unresolved. John has spoken about this dispute and the state of the Australian music industry in interviews with ABC News Radio, ABC Drive and numerous community radio stations.

== Discography ==
=== Matt Finish ===
- 1980 Matt Finish Play Africa: CIA – Mancini Shuffle
- 1981 Short Note
- 1981 Short Note – Layman's Day
- 1981 Fade Away
- 1983 Matt Finish
- 1984 Words and Wars – Still Roads (I Need It) – Come on Over
- 1984 Word of Mouth
- 1984 Always Another – Forecast
- 2001 Just a Short Note (The Best of)
- 2006 Don't Fade Away 2006
- 2008 1978–2008
- 2009 Matt Finish Live at the Musicians Club 1981
- 2009 New Frontier
- 2010 Civic Hotel
- 2010 Music Farm
- 2010 Short Note Remastered
- 2010 Parramatta Park & Melbourne Uni
- 2010 Fade Away Sessions
- 2010 Word of Mouth (2CD)
- 2010 At The Tivoli
- 2010 Truck Surfing
- 2010 Kite on a Hurricane Day

=== Matt Moffitt ===
- 1986 By As Little As A Look
- 1987 The Key To Camden Lock
- 1989 In The Mist Of Candlewood Lake

=== Other Artists ===
- 1986 Mark Edwards – Land Of The Living
- 1987 Johnny Batchelor – Work And Save
- 1991 Guy Le Claire – Guy Le Claire
- 1991 Keith Urban – Keith Urban
- 1993 Wicked Beat Sound System – Summer Sun, Inside, Stand Up
- 1993 Pam Sethi – Sai Baba
- 1993 Pam Sethi – Pam Sethi
- 1994 Great South Land – Great South Land
- 1994 Toni Nation – Toni Nation
- 1995 Young Chen Lhamo – Tibetan Prayer
- 1996 Heavenly Light Quartet – Heavenly Light Quartet
- 1997 Guy Le Claire – Naughty
- 1997 Xiang – Xiang
- 1997 Bujuanes – This Is Life
- 1998 Ragged Band – Distant Shores
- 1998 Pan De Cielo – Bread of Heaven
- 1998 iOTA – iOTA
- 1999 Maréa – No Distractions Please
- 1999 iOTA – The Hip Bone Connection
- 2000 Merge – Interface
- 2000 Mr House – The Fruits of Mr House
- 2001 Eclection – Day And Night
- 2001 Ear Candy – Made in Australia
- 2001 Ear Candy – Feels Like Summer
- 2001 Ear Candy – Candy For Your Soul
- 2002 Merge – The Need To Fall
- 2002 Play Act One – Story of Abbey
- 2003 Astral Taxi – Leave Nothing Untouched
- 2005 Jennifer Whatson – Jennifer Whatson
- 2006 Meryl Leppard – Meryl Leppard
- 2007 Robot Productions – Robot Productions
- 2008 Steve Lockyer – Sticks & Stones
- 2008 David Kingdom – Tattoo
- 2009 The Shaggers – The Shaggers
- 2009 Sameera Bashir – The Cat, The Fiddle & This Tune
- 2010 Love Child – Love Child 1
- 2010 John Prior – The Red Sea
- 2011 The Unnamed Sources – Nowhere To Hide
- 2011 Stone and the Sky – Stone and the Sky
- 2011 Sophie Von – Sophie Von
- 2012 Ray Husband – Together Now
- 2012 Gordon Trott – Bass Straight
- 2012 Peter Colleer – Peter Colleer
- 2012 Love Child – Love Child 2
- 2012 Nikki Nichols – Don't Let Them Cry
- 2012 The Inner West – Fatal Sounds
- 2013 The Ians – The Ians
- 2013 Deloitte – Experience (soundtrack)
- 2013 Redfern All Blacks (training videos)
- 2013 Heavily Made Up Boy – My Hysteria
- 2014 Farooq Haider – Dooriyan (video)
- 2014 Love Child / Circus In Town
- 2014 Deloitte – Luck (soundtrack)
- 2014 Sacred Cow – Misery
- 2014 Heavily Made Up Boy – First World Problems
- 2014 Sanghaied Project – Shanghaied
- 2014 Warren McLean – Brass Gongs
- 2014 Guy Le Claire – Rock Hitz
- 2014 Farooq Haider – Rang De
- 2014 Farooq Haider – Azadi
- 2014 Placebo Cure – Thistle Fixit
- 2014 Music Box – Muzique
- 2014 Ray Husband – Together Now
- 2014 Eddie Brown – Things That Matter
- 2015 Seven – Masters
- 2015 Jacquie McGill – Will Devine
- 2015 Magnus – I
- 2016 The Final Word – Start Again
- 2016 Skip Tracer – Blistered
- 2016 Blood Blossoms – Hymns From the Pit
- 2016 Music Box – Kiss Me Twice
- 2016 Farooq Haider – Haq Allah
- 2016 Martin Nickson – Into The Blue
- 2016 Martin Nickson – Let’s Pretend
- 2016 Craig Learmont – The Garden Of Earthly Delights
- 2016 Samantha Cartwright – Edge Of The World
- 2016 The Final Word – On The Edge Of Nowhere
- 2017 Paul Kougias – Come Walk With Me
- 2017 Travis Masters – The Auburn Girl
- 2017 Good Life – Good Life Theme
- 2017 The Final Word – Crazy Like This
- 2020 Anita Monk – Walking In The Park
- 2021 Steve Williams – When I See You Dancing
- 2019 Sophie Von – Christmas Album
- 2019 Dulwich High School Rock Band – Time To Party
- 2019 Peter Colleer – Laid Plans
- 2020 Ethelated Spirits – I'll Take Care Of You
- 2020 Sophie Von – World Album
- 2020 Mr President – I Don't Mind remix
- 2020 Aegean Quartet – Aegean Quartet
- 2020 Martin Nickson – Fiesta
- 2021 Seven – 2021
- 2021 Equity Lane – Echoes Of The Boom
- 2022 Peter Colleer – Better World
- 2022 Seven – 2022
- 2022 Peter Fenwick – Know It

=== Production Music ===
- 1995 Bruton Music UK – Impact Promotions
- 1996 Bruton Music UK – Pop Music
- 1996 Bruton Music UK – various compilation albums
- 2003 Unreal Music – Energy
- 2003 Unreal Music – Smooth
- 2003 Unreal Music – Pop Roots
- 2003 Unreal Music – Club Soda
- 2003 Unreal Music – Master Grooves
- 2003 Unreal Music – Café Cool
- 2003 Unreal Music – Extra Chunky
- 2003 Unreal Music – Guitar Lover
- 2003 Unreal Music – Retail Melodies
- 2003 Unreal Music – Neo Classics
- 2003 Unreal Music – Arabmatic
- 2003 Unreal Music – Folk & Gypsy
- 2003 Unreal Music – Atmosphere
- 2003 Unreal Music – Earth
- 2003 Unreal Music – Romantic Piano
- 2003 Unreal Music – Unreal Christmas
- 2003 Unreal Music – All Sorts
- 2003 Unreal Music – Survival Kit
- 2004 Unreal Music – Celestial Grooves
- 2004 Unreal Music – Astral Riffs
- 2004 Unreal Music – Urban Dub
