= JG Montgomery =

Australian/ English author

JG Montgomery is an Australian/ English author. He was born in Redruth, Cornwall, England and lives in Canberra, Australia.

He is the son of a Royal Australian Air Force officer and defence attaché. He is known for his writing on the supernatural and paranormal.

== Personal life ==
He is the older brother of renowned Australian/ English based conductor Jessica Cottis. He is a graduate of the University of Canberra.

He is also a musician, vocalist and songwriter. He has university degrees in cultural heritage and teaching and a Diploma in parapsychology. He is also a decorated State Emergency Service (SES) volunteer.

== Career ==
He served in both the Australian Army Reserve and Australian Air Force and the Australian Capital Territory State Emergency Service (SES). He was awarded the Emergency Service Medal in the 2021 Queen's Birthday honours for distinguished service.

He is the author of A Case for Ghosts (Ginninderra Press 2012) which was described by poet PS Cottier as "an engaging book to read. It's as if the author were sitting with the reader in a pub, in front of an open fire, telling anecdotes about his explorations into the ghostly universe that may possibly shadow the everyday," and by the RiotACT that (he) "is quite open-minded in his approach to the subject. He does not preach as to the existence or non-existence of ghosts, but tantalises and entertains."

He is also the author and illustrator of the children's book The Oomee Mau Mau as well as WYRD- A journey into the beliefs and philosophies of the known and unknown and Meditations in Orange, an autobiographical look at his career as an active member in the Australian State Emergency Service (SES). He also wrote Haunted Australian: Ghosts of the Great Southern Land and Haunted Britain: Supernatural Realms of the United Kingdom, both of which were released in 2017.

In March 2018, he released Summer to Summer, a fictional account/ memoir coming of age novel based in Canberra during the 1980s. Also in 2018, he released Haunted Castles of England. A Tour of 99 Ghostly Fortesses, which examined the history and alleged hauntings of numerous castles in England sorted by geographical regions. In April of the same year he also released a solo album of original songs Paper Walls under the name James Montgomery-Willcox.

He contributed and edited poetry in Capital Reflections. He has also spoken about ghosts on radio programs and at the National Museum of Australia, and has written, researched and co-produced numerous short documentaries. In 2019, he appeared as an extra playing a parliamentarian in the ABC/ Blackfella Films television series Black Bitch. In 2020, he released his fifth book about ghosts- Capital Manifestations- Tales of Haunted Canberra. In 2021 he appeared ABC's television series "Total control" as a parliamentarian.

== Bibliography ==
=== History/ travel ===
White Horse Dreaming (Blossom Spring Publishing) 2025

=== Supernatural/ paranormal ===
Weird Australia (Blossom Spring Publishing) 2026

Mysterious Creatures of Britain (Blossom Spring Publishing) 2025

Capital Manifestations- Tales of Haunted Canberra (Pendragon Publishing & Design) 2020

Haunted Castles of England. A Tour of 99 Ghostly Fortresses (Llewellyn Publications ) 2018

Haunted Britain: Supernatural Realms of the United Kingdom (Schiffer Publishing) June 2017

Haunted Australia: Ghosts of the Great Southern Land (Schiffer Publishing) 2017

WYRD- A journey into the beliefs and philosophies of the known and unknown (CFZ Press 2014)

A Case for Ghosts (Ginninderra Press 2012) -Nominated for ACT Book of the Year 2013

=== Children's ===
The Oomee Mau Mau (Willowmoon Press 2012)

The Extraordinarily Strange Tale of Solomon Fox (Blossom Spring Publishing) 2026

Beyond the Riverbank. An Otter's Tale. (Blossom Spring Publishing) 2026

=== Autobiographical ===
Meditations in Orange (Pendragon Publishing & Design 2014)

=== Fiction/ Memoir ===
Summer to Summer (Pendragon Publishing & Design 2018)

=== Poetry ===
Capital Reflections (Contributed to and compiled. Pendragon Publishing & Design 2014)

=== Essays ===
What Are Ghosts? And Why Do We Believe in Them? (The Llewellyn Journal) 2018

The Ghosts of Lanyon Homestead (The Ghost Club Journal. Issue 2) 2024

=== Screenplay ===
The Roaring Bunyip with Tim the Yowie man. (Documentary. Carillion Pictures 2013)

TYM The Series - Haunted Tales of Burnima Homestead. (Documentary. Austography 2017)

TYM The Series - The Mysteries of Lake George. (Documentary. Austography 2017)

TYM The Series - The Great Aussie Pie Challenge. (Documentary. Austography 2017)
