= Short Note =

Studio album by Matt Finish
- Released: February 1981
- Recorded: 1980 at Paradise Studios, Sydney, Australia
- Genre: Rock
- Length: 38:20
- Label: Giant Recording Company, CBS
- Producer: Peter Dawkins

Matt Finish chronology
Short Note (1981)	Fade Away (1981)

Short Note is the debut album and title track by Australian band Matt Finish, released in January 1981.

The album Short Note peaked at #14 in the Australian albums charts. The title song peaked at #18. It was recorded by Wendy Matthews and appeared on her 2004 album Café Naturale, featured in Triple M’s Best Songs of the Eighties poll in 2005, in the 2007 Australian feature film The Final Winter, and on numerous compilation albums including Rajon Music Group's Australian Made Volume 2 (2001), ScreenSound's Running In The Shadows (2004) and Sony BMG's The Essential Australian series (2008).

A new version of Short Note appears on Matt Finish's 2008 anthology album 1978-2008.

The cover was designed by Eric Gradman.

== Track listing ==
(All songs by Matt Moffitt except where noted)

1. "Look At Me" (Matt Moffitt, Rick Grossman)
2. "Hanging On"
3. "Short Note"
4. "Layman's Day"
5. "Forecast"
6. "Hot Cover" (Moffitt, R. Grossman, J. Clayton, J. Prior)
7. "Mancini Shuffle"
8. "Younger Days"
9. "Respectable"
10. "You Get So"

== Charts ==
Chart (1981)	Peak position
Australia (Kent Music Report)	18

== Personnel ==
- Matt Moffitt – lead vocals, lead guitar
- Jeff Clayton – guitar, backup vocals
- Rick Grossman – bass guitar
- John Prior – drums
- Don Walker – piano ("Younger Days")
