= Matt Finish =

Australian rock band

- Origin: Sydney, New South Wales, Australia
- Genre: Rock
- Years active: 1979–present
- Labels: Giant; CBS; Sony BMG; Mammal
- Members: John Prior; Glenn Bidmead; Steve Williams; Phil Hall
- Past members: See Members
- Website: mattfinish.com

Matt Finish are an Australian rock band formed in mid-1979 by singer-songwriter and guitarist Matt Moffitt (1956–2003) and drummer, composer and producer John Prior. The 1981 line-up of Moffitt, Prior, Richard Grossman on bass guitar and Jeff Clayton on rhythm guitar recorded their debut album, Short Note, which peaked at No. 14 on the Australian Kent Music Report Albums Chart. The title song, "Short Note", peaked at No. 33 on the related Singles Chart and became a standard on Australian radio stations. Grossman was later a member of Divinyls and Hoodoo Gurus. On 13 August 2003 Moffit died in his sleep, aged 46. From 2006 Prior has continued Matt Finish with various line-ups.

In 2004 "Short Note" was covered by Wendy Matthews and appeared on her album Café Naturale. It was listed in Triple M's 2005 Best Songs of the Eighties poll, it appeared in the 2007 Australian feature film The Final Winter and on numerous compilation albums including Sony BMG's Essential Australian Rock released in April 2008; and a new recording of the track appears on Matt Finish's 2008 anthology album 1978-2008.

== History ==
=== 1970s ===
Matt Finish's formation developed from an earlier, similarly named group, Matt Finnish. The latter were a briefly existing Australian funk band formed in early 1978 in Sydney by singer-songwriter and guitarist Matt Moffitt (1956–2003), bass guitarist Brian Alcorn and drummer Tony Georgeson. They performed for several months, including shows at The Observer Hotel, The Rocks, Sydney, before disbanding in early 1979. In the early 1990s, Georgeson formed the Dukes, with Sean Kelly, before joining Sydney jazz band the Jive Bombers. In August 1979, Alcorn and Moffitt teamed up with drummer, composer and producer John Prior to form Matt Finish, as a rock band.

On 20 August 1979 New Zealanders Jeff Clayton (bass guitar and vocals) and Glen White (guitar) completed the band's early line-up. From 1979 to 1980, like their contemporaries Midnight Oil, Flowers/Icehouse and INXS, Matt Finish played regular residencies in clubs and pubs around Sydney most nights of the week, often double-gigging on weekends. In November 1979, radio station 2JJ broadcast Matt Finish live-to-air from the Civic Hotel in Pitt Street, Sydney and continued to broadcast the raw live performances for a year. In 2009 these recordings appeared in the Flight Case box set collection.

=== 1980s ===
Matt Finish, 1981, left-right: John Prior, Richard Grossman, Jeff Clayton, Matt Moffitt

In January 1980, Matt Finish's line-up changed when Clayton contracted hepatitis and was replaced on bass guitar by Rick Grossman (ex-Eric Gradman's Man and Machine) who had attended Sydney Boys High School with Prior. In February they undertook a month-long tour of Queensland tour, the band recorded at Music Farm Studios near Byron Bay and radio stations around Australia added these recordings to their regular play-lists. Upon returning to Sydney in March, Glen White left the band. Moffitt, Prior and Grossman performed live as a three-piece while auditioning over fifty guitarists until in May Clayton rejoined on rhythm guitar.

In mid-1980, Matt Finish recorded at ABC Sydney Studio 221, from which radio station 2JJ also broadcast, with the songs "Indicator" and "Red Lights" becoming underground hits. The band was touring interstate regularly and attendances at live performances increased. Matt Finish signed to Peter Dawkins-owned, The Giant Recording Company, which on-signed its rights to CBS Records International. In November 1980, released their debut double A-sided single, "Matt Finish Play Africa" with the tracks "C.I.A." and "Mancini Shuffle". Radio stations around Australia broadcast on high rotation.

On 18 January 1981, Matt Finish performed at the Last Double Jay Concert to an audience of 40,000 at Parramatta Park with the concert broadcast live-to-air. That same week, the group performed at the Sydney Musicians Club, which was filmed and, in 2009, was released on a DVD, Matt Finish Live at the Musicians Club 1981. In February 1981 Matt Finish released their first album, Short Note, on Giant/CBS Records, it was produced by Dawkins (Finch, Mi-Sex). It peaked at No. 14 on the Australian Kent Music Report Albums Chart. The title song, "Short Note", peaked at No. 18 on the related Singles Chart. The newly established Triple J (successor to Double Jay) FM radio network played tracks from Short Note nationally, followed by the commercial networks. In July that year, Matt Finish recorded a live five-track extended play, Fade Away at PACT Theatre in the old Corn Exchange building in Sussex Street, Sydney. The EP was released in October 1981. Original copies are now considered collector's items.

Due to Moffitt's declining health, the band split up at the end of 1981. Grossman joined Divinyls for six years (1982–1987) and later was a member of Hoodoo Gurus. In May 1983, Matt Finish reconvened with Moffitt, Prior and Clayton – they recommenced touring and recording with a variety of musicians including Bertie Dorset (bass guitar and guitar), Anthony Smith (keyboards), Jim Cox (percussion), Ken Francis (guitar), Rob Riley (guitar), Doug Ironside (guitar), Dave Leslie (guitar) and Russell Nelson (guitar).

In November 1983, Clayton, Prior and Moffitt released the EP Matt Finish which was followed in May 1984 by their second album, Word of Mouth – co-produced by the band and Colin Freeman. The following September, Matt Finish performed 15 shows on U2's Under Australian Skies Tour, including five sold-out shows at the Sydney Entertainment Centre. In November 1984, Moffitt and Prior recorded 16 songs at ATA Studios in Glebe to secure Moffitt's solo recording deal with CBS Records Australia. By early 1985 Moffitt had disbanded Matt Finish and pursued his solo career. In March 1985, Moffitt and Prior travelled to London and Belgium to record Moffitt's first solo album As Little as a Look. It was recorded by UK producer Nicky Graham with session musicians Pete Glennister, Felix Krish, Simon Climie and Rob Fisher. "Miss This Tonight", the first single from album, reached No. 17. The song was played on FM rock stations in Australia. Matt Finish remained inactive from 1986 to 1989 while Moffitt and Prior pursued other projects, Prior produced recordings in New York with Moffitt in 1989 but the tracks were never released. At about this time Moffitt toured outside Australia with a group called Blue Max.

=== 1990s ===
In 1990 Matt Finish was reformed by Moffitt and Prior with former Eurogliders members Guy Le Claire (guitar) and Lindsay Jehan (bass), and New Yorker Jennifer Barrett (guitar, vocals, ex-Blue Max). Managed and promoted by Prior, the band completed a tour of 50 performances around Australia. The band recorded four songs produced by Peter Blyton at Studios 301 and Bondi Road Studios which were never released.

In 1991 Matt was joined by Michael O'Grady (bass), Paul Di Como (guitar) and Kevin Watzisname (drums) to play shows from November to April in Sydney, Newcastle and Wollongong. Venues included The Manzil room, Moby's at Whale Beach, Manly Boatshed and others.

In April 1992, Moffitt released a limited edition solo acoustic CD EP Euroka, produced by Blyton. In June that year, Moffitt re-signed with producer Peter Dawkins and using the name Matt Finish (with permission of Prior – his company Mammal Music owns the Matt Finish trademark) released the single "One Day at a Time". The album, By Heart (September 1993), and an EP Earthbound (July) featured a line-up of Moffitt with Adrian Cannon (drums), Rohan Cannon (guitar and vocals) and Bobby Christian (bass guitar) with Paul Dawkins (son of Peter Dawkins) on keyboards. The line-up of Moffitt and Paul Dawkins with Eliot Reynolds (guitar) and Justin Leef (drums) released the singles "Blue" (September 1993) and "Will I Ever Know?" (May 1994).

Early 1996 to late 1997, Matt Finish reformed as a live touring act and embarked on a substantial touring schedule (The Boys Are Back in Town tour, Back to the Beach tour, plus dozens of hotel and club dates) featuring Matt Moffitt guitar and vocals, Geoff Marr bass and vocals, Chris Parkhurst guitar, Neil Marr drums, Darrel Smith drums.

=== 2000s ===
From late 2000 the band Fire Hand Ember with Moffitt and Grossman joined by Joseph Calderazzo (guitar and vocals) and Wayne Grech (drums) performed 20 shows. Some gigs used the alternate names Matt Finish or Matt Moffitt for the same line-up. Fire Hand Ember's repertoire included Matt Finish tracks, "Mancini Shuffle", "Layman's Day" and "Short Note". In 2001, Matt Finish's track "Short Note" was compiled on Australian Made Volume 2 issued by Rajon Music Group. Also that year, Matt Finish line-up with Moffitt and Grossman released the limited edition compilation CD entitled, Just a Short Note.

On 13 August 2003, Moffitt died suddenly in his sleep, aged 46. His funeral, on what would have been his 47th birthday, 20 August, was attended by hundreds of people including Rob Hirst (Midnight Oil), Don Walker (Cold Chisel), Doc Neeson (The Angels), Scott Johnston Rose Tattoo, Swanee (aka John Swan) and Grossman. The number-plate of Matt's hearse was MF-47. In 2004, ScreenSound (National Film & Sound Archives) released a compilation CD album called Running in the Shadows: Oz rock rarities 1983-1994 featuring Matt Finish. In May that year, "Short Note" was covered by Wendy Matthews and appeared on her album Café Naturale.

In late 2006, Prior reformed Matt Finish with Clayton, Luke Dixon (vocals and guitar) and Matt Cornell (vocals and bass guitar) for the Matt Moffitt Memorial Tour, which was promoted by Rob Prior, John's elder brother. At The Basement, Sydney, Grossman joined the band as a special guest. In December that year, Matt Finish released "Don't Fade Away", a new version of "Fade Away", free on the internet to commemorate the tribute tour.

In April 2007, Prior, David Adams (vocals and guitar) and Harry Brus (bass guitar and vocals) embarked on a 50-show Australian tour, joined by various guests including Steve Edmonds (guitar and vocals), Kevin Borich (guitar and vocals), Tim Gaze (guitar), Eliot Reynolds (guitar), Russ Nelson (guitar and vocals), Barry Leef (vocals and guitar), Al Slavik (bass guitar), Les Rankin (guitar and vocals), Seven Hawkes (guitar), Tom Ruki (bass guitar) and Guy Le Claire (guitar). In December that year, Parrish Muhoberac (guitar and vocals) joined Matt Finish and the band completed a new album at Prior's Unity Gain Studios in Erskineville on Christmas Eve. In January 2008, Matt Finish released the album 1978–2008, a freshly recorded retrospective album with three previously unreleased songs, "Dream Away", "Cold Wars" and "River". In June that year, Guy Le Claire rejoined and the group embarked on a tour with saxophonist Dale Barlow, who had previously attended South Strathfield Public School with Prior.

In January 2009, a DVD, Matt Finish Live at the Musicians Club 1981, was released, with concert footage of the band performing live in the eighties. In February, the EP New Frontier was released, featuring David Adams (vocals/guitar), Brus, Dieter Kleemann (guitar), Le Claire, Prior, Victor Rounds (bass). It was arranged and produced by Prior at Unity Gain Studios Sydney and mastered by William Bowden at King Willy Sound Sydney. In March, they regrouped as a three-piece of Prior and Brus with Glenn Bidmead (vocals and guitar). Brus was replaced by Kim May and then Tom Ruki on bass guitar. In July, the band released two retrospective CDs, Short Note Remastered and Civic Hotel and in September they issued Fade Away Sessions and Word of Mouth. In December, the band released Flight Case, a retrospective 12-disc box set. In January 2013, Matt Finish headlined three days at the Thredbo Blues Festival featuring Elliot Weston on vocals, Nick Meredith on guitar, Peter Astley on bass and John Prior on drums.

In 2014 and 2015, Prior promoted a number of shows around Australia titled The Oz Rock Roadshow, featuring Matt Finish, with Ric Herbert on vocals, Dai Pritchard guitar, Justin Bianchi bass and Prior on drums, plus special guest vocalists Mark Gable, Angry Anderson, Mick Pealing and Steve Mulry, and guitarist Bob Spencer.

The current line up began in 2017 with Prior, Herbert, Steve Williams on guitar and Phil Hall on bass and vocals, with Glenn Bidmead rejoining the band on vocals and guitar in 2025. Since 2017, the band have performed a number of sold-out shows around Australia with Empire Touring, including Enmore Theatre in Sydney, Wagga Wagga and Gosford Racecourses, Goulburn Workers Arena, WIN Entertainment Centre Wollongong, Roche Estate Hunter Valley, Sandstone Point Queensland, and Parramatta Park on Australia Day 2019 attended by more than 20,000 people.

== Members ==
The following is a list of band members arranged chronologically:

- Matt Moffitt – vocals, guitar (1978–1981, 1983–1985, 1990–2003) (d. 13 August 2003)
- John Prior – drums (1979–1981, 1983–1985, 1990–1993, 2006–present)
- Jeff Clayton – bass guitar, rhythm guitar (1979–1980, 1980–1981, 1983–1985, 2006)
- Glen White – guitar (1979–1980)
- Rick Grossman – bass guitar (1980–1981, 2006)

Guest musicians

- Jim Cox – percussion (1983)
- Bertie Dorsett – guitar, bass guitar (1983–1984)
- Ken Francis – guitar (1983)
- Rob Riley – guitar (1983)
- Anthony Smith – keyboards (1983–1984)
- Russell Nelson – guitar (1984)
- Doug Ironside – guitar (1984)
- Guy Le Claire – guitar (1990–1993, 2008, 2012)
- Lindsay Jehan – bass guitar (1990–1993)
- Jennifer Barrett – guitar, vocals (1990–1993)
- Darrio Bortolin aka Bobby Christian – bass guitar (1993)
- Adrian Cannon – drums (1993)
- Rohan Cannon – guitar, vocals (1993)
- Paul Dawkins – keyboards, vocals (1993–1994)
- Mark Mansfield – drums (1996–97)
- Chris Parkinson – guitar (1996–97)
- Geoff Marr – bass guitar, vocals (1996–97)
- Neil Marr – drums (1997)
- Darryl Spyda-Smith – drums (1997)
- Eliot Reynolds – guitar (1994–2003)
- Justin Leef – drums (1994–2003)
- Matt Cornell – vocals, bass guitar (2006)
- Luke Dixon – vocals, guitar (2006)
- David Adams – vocals, guitar (2007–2008, 2012)
- Harry Brus – bass guitar, vocals (2007–2008, 2012)
- Steve Edmonds – guitar, vocals (2007)
- Les Rankin – guitar, vocals (2007)
- Kevin Borich – guitar, vocals (2007)
- Parrish Muhoberac – guitar, vocals (2007)
- Dale Barlow – saxophone (2008)
- Dennis Val;- guitar, vocals 2009
- Glenn Bidmead – vocals, guitar (2009–2011)
- Tom Ruki – bass guitar, vocals (2009–2011)
- Peter Astley – bass guitar (2013)
- Nick Meredith – guitar (2013)
- Elliott Weston – vocals, guitar (2013)
- Justin Bianchi – bass, vocals
- Dai Pritchard – guitar
- Ric Herbert – vocals
- Steve Williams – guitar (current)
- Phil Hall – bass, vocals (current)
- Glenn Bidmead – vocals, guitar (current)

== Discography ==
=== Studio albums ===
List of studio albums, with selected details and chart positions
Title	Album details	Peak chart positions
Title	Album details	AUS
Short Note	Released: March 1981; Format: LP, cassette; Label: Giant Recording Company (GIANT 01)	18
Word of Mouth	Released: May 1984; Format: LP, cassette; Label: CBS (SBP 237999)	25
By Heart	Released: 1993; Format: CD, cassette; Label: Nova (74321158022)	—

=== Live albums ===
List of live albums, with selected details
Title	Album details
Matt Finish at the Tivoli	Released: 2009; Format: CD, download; Recorded live at The Tivoli nightclub Sydney on 6 August 1983

=== Compilation albums ===
List of compilation albums, with selected details
Title	Album details
1978–2008	Released: 2008; Format: CD, download; Label: Mammal Music
Kite on a Hurricane Day	Released: 2009; Format: CD, download; Previously unissued studio recordings from 1984, 1991, and 1999

=== Box sets ===
List of box sets, with selected details
Title	Album details
Flight Case	Released: 2009; Format: CD, download; 11× CD box set, + 1 DVD
Set One: Discs 1–6	Released: 2011; Format: CD, download; 6× CD box set
Set Two: Discs 7–12	Released: 2011; Format: CD, download; 6× CD box set

=== Extended plays ===
List of EPs, with selected details and chart positions
Title	EP details	Peak chart positions
Title	EP details	AUS
Fade Away	Released: October 1981; Format: LP, cassette; Label: Giant Recording Company (Giant EP01)	59
Matt Finish	Released: 1983; Format: LP, cassette; Label: CBS (BA 12056)	—
New Frontier	Released: 2009; Format: CD, download; Label: Matt Finish	—

=== Singles ===
List of singles, with selected chart positions
Title	Year	Peak chart positions	Album
Title	Year	AUS	Album
"Mancini Shuffle"	1980	57	Short Note
"Short Note"	1981	33	Short Note
"Out on These Moments"	1983	53	Word of Mouth
"Always Another"	1984	77	Word of Mouth
"Words and Wars"	1984		Word of Mouth
