= Harry Brus =

Australian bass player and guitarist

Background information
- Origin: Sydney, Australia
- Genres: Soul; funk; blues; rock; progressive rock
- Occupations: musician, composer
- Instruments: bass guitar, guitar, vocals
- Years active: 1964–present
- Website: Harry Brus' official website

Harry Brus (born April 1949, in Graz, Austria) is an Australian bass player and guitarist, best known for his work with Matt Finish, Kevin Borich, Renée Geyer, Australian Crawl, Leo Sayer, Marcia Hines, Jimmy Barnes, Ross Wilson and Billy Thorpe.

Thredbo Blues Festival describes Harry Brus as "a unique stylist" and he is widely recognized as "a powerful and sensitive player" with "tons of credibility".

== History ==
=== 1960s ===
Harry "The Doctor" Brus arrived in Australia at the age of seven from Graz, Austria where his music career started in 1964, inspired by James Jamerson, Hank Marvin and The Beatles.

In 1965, Brus' band The Amazons signed a record deal with Festival subsidiary Leedon Records and since then he has continued to work as a professional musician. Another member of The Amazons was John Cave.

In 1967, he played lead guitar with pop idol Johnny Young and later joined Tony Gaha and The in People, featuring Ron Barry and Janice Slater. During this period he was recruited for the original lineup of the Dave Miller Set but left the band soon after it formed.

In the late sixties, Brus teamed up with Geoff Oakes playing soul music.

Brus also performed bass guitar in the stage musical Hair, before forming the band Birth with jazz pianist Roger Frampton and English drummer Tony Hicks from Backdoor.

=== 1970s ===
In 1970, Brus joined Jeff St John & Copperwine, who had a top five Australian hit single with Teach Me How To Fly.

Also in 1970, he recorded a live album with Australian blues singer Wendy Saddington, Live at Walacia.

This was followed by stints with Blackfeather, Dave Miller Set, Ross Wilson, Little Sammy and The in People, Birth, Hunger, Mother Earth, The Bobby Gebert Trio, Fender Benders, Foreday Riders, Duffhead, The Healers, Phil Jones and The Unknown Blues Band.

Brus then began long-term relationships as bass player with Renée Geyer and Kevin Borich.

In the late 1970s, Brus joined the Barry Leef Band, featuring guitarist Stevie Housden, and they had a residency at the Musicians Club in Sydney for two years.

=== 1980s ===
During the Eighties, Brus toured and recorded with Kevin Borich, Renée Geyer, Marcia Hines, Joe Walsh, Phil Emmanuel, Ross Wilson and Russell Morris.

In 1985, Brus became a member of Australian Crawl and recorded Between a Rock and a Hard Place.

Other highlights include jamming with Leon Russell, Billy Preston and Ron Wood.

=== 1990s ===
During the nineties, Brus toured and recorded with Kevin Borich, Renée Geyer, Jimmy Barnes, Billy Thorpe, Brian Cadd and was bass guitarist in the house band on the highly successful Long Way to the Top tour and album.

=== 2000s ===
Brus continues to tour and record with Kevin Borich and Leo Sayer. He is a regular performer at the annual Thredbo Blues Festival and has recorded and toured with James Southwell and Gail Page.

In 2007, he joined Matt Finish with John Prior and recorded bass guitar and vocals on their 1978 – 2008 album and New Frontier EP.

== Equipment ==
- Fender precision bass guitar
- Spector bass guitar
- Fender Rhodes electric piano

== Discography ==
- 1966 The Amazons / Ain’t That Lovin' You Baby b/w You'd Better Mind

- 1970 Jeff St John and the Copperwine / Teach Me How To Fly
- 1971 Wendy Saddington and Copperwine / Live at Wallacia
- 1973 Renée Geyer with Mother Earth / Renée Geyer
- 1979 Kevin Borich / Australian Guitar Compilation
- 1985 Australian Crawl / Between a Rock and a Hard Place
- 1986 Renée Geyer / Live at the Basement
- 1993 Renée Geyer / Seven Deadly Sins (ABC TV mini-series soundtrack)
- 1998 Kevin Borich / Heart Starter
- 2001 Russell Morris / Gimme Ted live DVD
- 2001 Renée Geyer / Women at the Well – Songs of Paul Kelly
- 2002 Various Artists / Long Way to the Top Australian tour CD and DVD
- 2004 Kevin Borich / Nomad
- 2005 Jimmy Barnes / Double Happiness
- 2006 James Southwell Band / Dark Angel
- 2006 Leo Sayer / Live in Melbourne
- 2008 Matt Finish / 1978 – 2008
- 2009 Matt Finish / New Frontier
- 2009 Kevin Borich, Lucius Borich, Harry Brus / "Live At The Basement"
