= Bruton Music =

Production music library

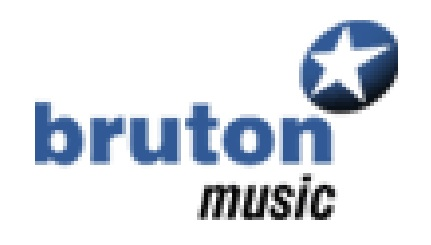
- Parent company: ATV Music (1977-1982) Zomba Group (1986-2002) BMG Music (2002-2007) Universal Music Group (2007 - present)
- Founded: 1976 / 1977
- Founder: Robin Phillips
- Genre: Various
- Country of origin: England
- Location: London

Bruton Music was a record label based in London, United Kingdom. It was associated with music library type recordings. A range of notable artists have contributed music to the label.

== Background ==
Bruton Music was founded by Robin Phillips in 1976/1977. They originally operated from ATV Music’s offices in Bruton Street, London. At some stage, Michael Jackson ended up owning the label. It was later sold to the Zomba Group.

Artists who have composed and or contributed music to the label include, David Arnold, Hal David, Brian Dee, George Fenton, Louis Clark, Alan Hawkshaw, Irving Martin, John Paricelli, the James Taylor Quartet, Sam Fonteyn, and Norman Warren.

The music released by the label is generally for film, television and radio projects.

== History ==
As of April 1978, the label had sixty albums in twenty categories available. They had also gone in the direction away from the recognized library format but catering to the needs of the client. They had also taken on Jack Dorsey, Tony Hiller, Richard Hill, John Hawkins, Alan Hawkshaw, Johnny Pearson, Dennis King and Miki Anthony as their writers. Also that year, Bruton Music had entered into an agreement with Regent Recorded Music for representation rights in the United States which was until October 1983.

In 1979, the Bruton Music song "Hit and Run" by David Easter was used in the disco film, Music Machine.

In 1984, the Bruton Music record "Kids and Cartoons" was used in its entirety as the background music for the Brazilian dub of "El Chavo del Ocho" and "El Chapulin Colorado", from Roberto Gómez Bolaños.

In 1986, Bruton Music was purchased by the Zomba Group. At the time, Bruton Music was one of the four libraries that dominated the market.
