= Matt Moffitt =

- With Matt Finish, 1984

Background information
- Born: Matthew David Moffitt; 20 August 1956; Sydney, New South Wales, Australia
- Died: 12 August 2003 (aged 46) Woollahra, New South Wales, Australia
- Genres: Rock; post-punk; alternative rock
- Occupations: Musician; singer-songwriter
- Instruments: Vocals; guitar
- Years active: 1972–2003
- Labels: Giant; CBS; Mushroom; Alberts; Warners; Universal

Matthew David Moffitt (20 August 1956 – 12 August 2003) was an Australian singer-songwriter and guitarist. He fronted the rock band, Matt Finish (1978–81, 1983–85, 1990–2003), and worked as a solo artist. Matt Finish were a popular live band, which had a top 20 hit on the Kent Music Report singles chart with "Short Note" (1981).

Moffit's released a solo album in 1986, titled As Little as a Look, it provided the single, "Miss This Tonight", which reached the top 30 in June 1986. Matt Moffitt died "in his sleep, apparently from a stroke"; his funeral was held on 20 August 2003, on what would have been his 47th birthday.

== Biography ==
=== 1956-1977:Early years ===
Matt Moffitt (born 1956) was the oldest child of Ian Moffitt (1926–2000), a journalist and writer, and Elizabeth "Betty" Saunders, also a journalist. He grew up with four siblings and spent his early childhood in Glenbrook in the Blue Mountains. The family relocated to New York City for a number of years.

In his teens Moffitt formed a Blue Mountains-based band, Rum Jungle, which performed cover versions of rock musicians; their "gigs sometimes turned into bloodbaths."

In the mid-1970s Moffitt studied drama at The Ensemble Theatre with Hayes Gordon and music at the Sydney Conservatorium of Music. His musical influences included NYC-based blues, soul and jazz groups; the Australian rock of Billy Thorpe and the Aztecs; and work by the Beatles and Led Zeppelin; and one of his inspirations was Jack Bruce's "Rope Ladder to the Moon". By 1977 the line-up of Rum Jungle included James Black (ex-Tymepiece) on guitar, Phil Colson, Mark McDonald, Bruce Sandell and Joe Sudouskas.

=== 1978-1984: Matt Finish ===
In late 1978 and early 1979 at The Observer Hotel in The Rocks, Sydney, Moffitt played in a short-term funk band, Matt Finnish, with Brian Alcorn on bass guitar and Tony Georgeson on drums. Guest musicians included Ken Francis and Chris Raggatt. In mid 1979 Moffitt and multi-instrumentalist John Prior formed Matt Finish as a rock group with Brian Alcorn on bass guitar. Jeff Clayton soon replaced White on bass guitar and was replaced in turn by Rick Grossman in early 1980 (ex-Bleeding Hearts, Parachute, Eric Gradman: Man & Machine).

Clayton rejoined by mid-1980 and the group issued their debut single, "Mancini Shuffle" in November via Peter Dawkins' label, Giant Records. Their debut album, Short Note, followed in March 1981, which peaked at No. 14 on the Australian Kent Music Report Albums Chart. It was produced by Dawkins and provided the group's second single, "Short Note", in February, which peaked at No. 18 on the Kent Music Report Singles Chart. The track was written by Moffitt and was later covered by Wendy Matthews. Short Note was re-released on CD in 1989.

Matt Finish released another album, Word of Mouth (1984), before Moffitt disbanded the group late in that year and travelled to London. In July 1986 he explained to Pollyanna Sutton of The Canberra Times, why the group split, "Somewhere towards the end of 1984 I didn't feel that I was writing the best... it wasn't good enough for people in that band to be near enough, they wanted to do their own thing."

Matt Finish had developed a reputation for high-quality song writing and passionate, high energy performances, including national tours supporting U2, Midnight Oil, INXS, Ramones, Split Enz, XTC, Cold Chisel, Bryan Ferry and the B-52's. According to Australian musicologist, Ian McFarlane, "[they] played a melodic brand of guitar-based pub-rock that garnered critical acclaim and a wide fan base."

=== 1985-1989: As Little as a Look ===
In 1985 Moffitt recorded his first solo album, As Little as a Look in London and Brussels with Prior on drums and Pete Glenister on guitar (of the London Hit Men). The album's producer, Nicky Graham (David Bowie, Peter Frampton, the Clash), also provided bass guitar and keyboards. The album was a departure from his material with Matt Finish, attracting a different demographic. It was released on compact disc by CBS/Sony/JAPAN. The Canberra Times' Lisa Wallace felt, "[he] has always had a talent that stood out in the crowd, from the gruff, at times gutteral [sic], drawl through to the tousled tawny hair, he walked and talked originality and elegance. And it's that originality that's missing from As Little as a Look."

Moffitt co-wrote material with Glenister, including two album tracks, "Miss This Tonight" (June 1986) and "All That Stuff" (August), which were released as singles. He described the collaboration to Sutton, "I saw that writing with somebody after a fairly insular environment had its own frustrations... [to] not let it degenerate into an 'us or them' situation. I felt a lot of pressure for that in the writing, you get tired and nationalism springs from the lips full blown." "Miss This Tonight" reached number 17 in June. Moffit's backing band for his tour comprised Glenister, Graham, Prior and Rob Fisher on keyboards.

Moffitt commuted between London and Sydney for a few years and then moved to the United States in 1988. He recorded at Supertramp's studio in Los Angeles, before moving to West Village. Prior travelled to the US in 1989 to produce recordings with Moffitt and his then-domestic partner, Jennifer Barrett, who is an American singer-songwriter and guitarist. In 1990 Moffitt returned to Sydney and formed a band, Blue Max, with Barrett on guitar and vocals, Christian Dunha, Bill Heckenberg on drums, and Glen Muirhead.

=== 1990-2002: Matt Finish again ===
In late 1990 and early 1991, Moffitt, Barrett and Prior reformed Matt Finish with Guy Le Claire on guitar (ex-Eurogliders, Ian Moss Band) and Lindsay Jehan on bass guitar (also ex-Eurogliders). They started an Australian tour. In June 1992 the group were signed to Mushroom Records and released a single, "One Day at a Time", in that month, which was produced by Peter Blyton (The Radiators, Machinations). A new line-up of Adrian Cannon on drums, Rohan Cannon on guitar and vocals, Bobby Christian on bass guitar and Paul Dawkins on keyboards, bass guitar, and drums recorded Matt Finish's next album, By Heart (September 1993). It provided a CD-EP, Earthbound (July) and a single "Blue" (September).

In May 1994 Matt Finish released a CD single, "Will I Ever Know?", with the line-up of Moffitt, Paul Dawkins on keyboards, Justin Leaf on drums, and Eliot Reynolds on guitar. It was backed by "Short Note Live" and "In My Dreams" as B-sides. In the late 1990s Moffitt took part in The Boys Are Back in Town, for tours of Australia.

In 2000 Moffitt and Grossman (by then, ex-Hoodoo Gurus) reunited to work on new material as Fire Hand Ember and performed shows around inner Sydney. They were joined by Joseph Calderazzo on guitar and Wayne Grech on drums and had a residency at the Iguana Bar in early January of the following year. The group performed Matt Finish material. For some gigs they used the alternate names Matt Finish or Matt Moffitt for the same line-up.

=== 2003: Death ===
On 12 August 2003 Matt Moffitt died in Sydney in his sleep, "apparently from a stroke", at the age of 46. His funeral on 20 August 2003 was attended by family, friends and key Australian music figures, including John Prior and Rick Grossman from Matt Finish, Don Walker (Cold Chisel), Doc Neeson (The Angels), Rob Hirst (Midnight Oil), John Swan (Swanee), Bernie Cannon (producer of GTK on ABC TV) and Rob Scott (Triple J). Moffitt was survived by his mother, Betty, his four siblings and a fiancée.

According to Annie Souter of The Sydney Morning Herald, he "sang from his soul with the voice of a dark angel, going for instinct rather than structure." She found, "he was a talented acoustic and electric guitarist." Souter and Moffitt were childhood friends. McFarlane observed, "[he] was hailed as a fine songwriter of considerable insight and potential."

== Discography ==
=== Studio albums ===
List of albums, with Australian chart positions
Title	Album details	Peak chart positions
Title	Album details	AUS
As Little as a Look	Released: 1986; Format: LP, Compact Disc; Label: CBS (SBP 8133)	30

=== Singles ===
List of singles, with Australian chart positions
Year	Title	Peak chart positions	Album
Year	Title	AUS	Album
1986	"Miss This Tonight"	27	As Little as a Look
1986	"All That Stuff"	84	As Little as a Look
1992	"Euroka"	-	non album single

=== See also ===
- Matt Finish
