= Party boy (disambiguation) =

Party boy is slang for a male prostitute.

Party boy or party boys may also refer to:

- Party Boy, an alias of American stunt performer Chris Pontius
- The Party Boys, an Australian rock supergroup
  - The Party Boys (album), the group's sole album
- The Party Boyz, an American hip hop group
- "Partyboy", a song by Danish pop group Hej Matematik from the 2013 EP Hej lights 2012
- Partyboys, a British pop trio who released a cover of "Build Me Up Buttercup" in 2003
