= No Song Too Sacred =

Live album by The Party Boys
- Released: 1984
- Genre: Rock
- Label: CBS
- Producer: Keith Walker

The Party Boys chronology
Greatest Hits (of Other People) (1983)	No Song Too Sacred (1984)	You Need Professional Help (1985)

No Song Too Sacred is the third album by Australian rock band The Party Boys. It was recorded during a tour in 1984. The band's line-up on this release included the founding members Kevin Borich, Paul Christie and Graham Bidstrup along with former Skyhooks singer Shirley Strachan and Rose Tattoo/Jimmy Barnes guitarist Robin Riley. In keeping with the band's tradition, the album was recorded live and features only covers of tracks by artists including the Rolling Stones, Led Zeppelin, Spencer Davis Group, Jimi Hendrix, The Who, The Police and AC/DC. "Kashmir" was issued as a single but was not a hit.

== Track listing ==
1. Brown Sugar (Jagger/Richards)
2. Foxy Lady (Hendrix)
3. Walking on the Moon (Sting)
4. Walking the Dog
5. I'm a Man (Winwood/Miller)
6. Kashmir (Page/Plant/Bonham)
7. Immigrant Song (Page/Plant)
8. Crossroads (Johnson)
9. Let There Be Rock (Young/Young/Scott)
10. My Generation (Townshend)

== Credits ==
- Shirley Strachan - vocals
- Kevin Borich - guitar
- Paul Christie - bass
- Graham Bidstrup - drums
- Robin Riley - guitar
