= The Missing Links (band) =

Australian garage rock/R&B/protopunk band (1964–1966)

- Origin: Sydney, New South Wales, Australia
- Genres: Garage rock, R&B, protopunk
- Years active: 1964–1966
- Past members: see members list below

The Missing Links were an Australian garage rock, R&B and protopunk band from Sydney who were active from 1964 to 1966. The group was known for wearing their hair long and smashing their equipment on-stage. Throughout the course of 1965, the band would go through a complete lineup change resulting in two completely different versions of the band: the first consisted of Peter Anson on guitar, Dave Boyne on guitar, Bob Brady on vocals, Danny Cox on drums and Ronnie Peel on bass and released their debut single, "We 2 Should Live" in March 1965.

The second and better-known version had none of the previous members and consisted of Andy Anderson on vocals (initially also on drums), Chris Gray on keyboards and harmonica, Doug Ford on vocals and guitar, Baden Hutchens on drums, and Ian Thomas on bass, and released their debut album, The Missing Links in December. According to Allmusic's, Richie Unterberger, "This aggregation cut the rawest Australian garage/punk of the era, and indeed some of the best from anywhere, sounding at their best like a fusion of the Troggs and the early Who, letting loose at times with wild feedback that was quite ahead of its time."

== History ==
=== Origins ===
The Missing Links formed in early 1964 in Sydney, Australia with the line-up of Peter Anson on guitar, Dave Boyne on guitar, Bob Brady on vocals, Danny Cox on drums and Ron Peel on bass guitar (ex-Mystics). With their long hair, according to one venue owner, "they looked like a cross between man and ape" and so were named the Missing Links (see transitional fossil). In November, the group played a benefit concert to support Oz founders Richard Neville, Richard Walsh and Martin Sharp. The trio had been charged with obscenity and were awaiting trial.

The first version of the band recorded a single, "We 2 Should Live" which was released in March 1965 on the Parlophone label. By that time, Boyne was replaced on guitar by John Jones (ex-Mystics) and Cox left soon after with New Zealand-born Andy Anderson (as Andy James aka Neville Anderson) joining, initially on drums. The band briefly broke up in July. Peter Anson formed a band, the Syndicate. They evolved into Jeff St. John and The Id. Bob Brady joined Python Lee Jackson, and Ron Peel joined Brisbane-based group, The Pleazers. In 1968 he became Rockwell T. James and formed The Rhythm Aces. A single "Love Power" was released. Ronnie then went to England and joined Thunderclap Newman and in 1973 he joined the La De Da's in Australia. By 1976 he was Rockwell T. James once more and had hits with "Come on Home" and "Roxanne"

=== Second lineup ===
The Missing Links reformed before the end of July with Anderson and Jones joined temporarily by Dave Longmore on vocals and guitar, Frank Kennington on vocals and Col Risby on guitar. Longmore was soon replaced by Doug Ford with Chris Gray joining on keyboards and harmonica, Baden Hutchens on drums and Ian Thomas on bass guitar (both ex-Showmen) completed the line-up of the second version, which was "even more fierce version than the first". During live performances, Anderson would climb walls to hang from rafters, then drive his head into the drums, other band members smashed guitars into speakers and all wore the latest Carnaby Street clothes.

With this totally new lineup, the group signed with Philips Records and released "You're Drivin' Me Insane" in August 1965 followed in September by "Wild About You". Veteran rock 'n' roller, Johnny O'Keefe was not a fan – he banned them from appearing on his television show, Sing Sing Sing. They issued another single in October, "H'tuom Tuhs," which was their version of "Mama Keep Your Big Mouth Shut," but with the tape reel played backwards on both sides of the record (as parts 1 and 2). It was followed by their debut album, The Missing Links, in December. According to Allmusic's, Richie Unterberger, "This aggregation cut the rawest Australian garage/punk of the era, and indeed some of the best from anywhere, sounding at their best like a fusion of the Troggs and the early Who, letting loose at times with wild feedback that was quite ahead of its time". In 1966 Baden Hutchins and Ian Thomas would depart. Hutchins, tired of the rock & roll lifestyle, was engaged to be married. Thomas returned to the Showmen, while the remaining members – Anderson, Gray, Ford and Jones – continued with an extended play, The Links Unchained in April 1966. The group disbanded in August.

=== Later developments ===
After The Missing Links had disbanded, Anderson and Ford formed Running Jumping Standing Still in Melbourne in August 1966. Anderson later became an actor on Australian and New Zealand television. Ford was lead guitarist in The Masters Apprentices from 1968. John Jones became a screenwriter in Hollywood.

== Legacy ==
Their self-titled 1965 LP was re-issued by Raven Records on vinyl in 1986 and (with a number of bonus tracks) by the Half A Cow label on CD in 1999. The original LP has sold to collectors for as much as A$2000 in August 2004.

The Australian road movie Oz (1976) featured two new versions of The Missing Links' "You're Driving Me Insane", sung by Graham Matters and produced by Ross Wilson.

The Missing Links have influenced many later Australian punk and hard rock groups, including The Saints who covered "Wild About You" on their first album, (I'm) Stranded (1977). In October 2010, The Missing Links' debut album, The Missing Links was listed in the top 50 in the book, 100 Best Australian Albums. They were one of the first rock groups to experiment with backward tapes and would do so in 1965, on both sides of their single, "H'tuom Tuhs," almost a year before the Beatles' experiments during the Revolver sessions.

== Members ==
First lineup

- Peter Anson – guitar, vocals (1964–April 1965)
- Dave Boyne – guitar (1964–March 1965)
- Bob Brady – vocals, percussion (1964–April 1965)
- Danny Cox – drums (1964–March 1965)
- Ronnie Peel – bass, harmonica (1964–April 1965)

Transitional lineup

- John Jones – guitar (March 1965–May 1965)
- Andy Anderson (as Andy James aka Neville Anderson) – vocals, drums (March 1965–May 1965)
- Dave Longmore – vocals, guitar (April 1965–May 1965)
- Frank Kennington – vocals
- Col Risby – guitar

Second lineup

- Andy Anderson (as Andy James aka Neville Anderson) – vocals (May 1965–April 1966), drums (March 1966–April 1966)
- Doug Ford – vocals, guitar (May 1965–April 1966)
- Chris Gray – keyboards, harmonica (May 1965–December 1966)
- John Jones – guitar (July 1965–April 1966)
- Baden Hutchens – drums, vocals (July 1965–March 1966)
- Ian Thomas – bass, vocals (July 1965–April 1966)

== Discography ==
=== Studio album ===
Year	Album details
1965	The Missing Links: Released: December 1965; Label: Philips (PD 199); Formats: LP

=== EP ===
Year	EP details
1966	The Links Unchained: Released: April 1966; Label: Philips (PE-31); Formats: 7"
1979	The Missing Links: Released: 1979; Label: Raven Records (RV-04); Formats: 7"

=== Singles ===
Release date	A side	B side	Label
March 1965	"We 2 Should Live"	"Untrue"	Parlophone (A8145)
August 1965	"You're Drivin' Me Insane"	"Somethin' Else"	Philips (BF-213)
September 1965	"Wild About You"	"Nervous Breakdown"	Philips (BF-224)
October 1965	"H'tuom Tuhs" (Part 1)	"H'tuom Tuhs" (Part 2)	Philips (BF-231)
November 1998	"Wild About You"	"Come My Way"	Half a Cow Records (MOO 11)

=== Compilation albums ===
Year	Album details
1999	Driving You Insane: Released: 1999; Label: Half A Cow Records (HAC 76); Format: CD
