= Ronnie Peel =

Australian musical artist (1946–2020)

- Also known as: Rockwell T. James
- Born: 9 August 1946; Port Macquarie, New South Wales, Australia
- Died: 1 November 2020 (aged 74) Wakefield, New South Wales, Australia
- Genres: Pop, R&B
- Occupation: Musician
- Instruments: Bass guitar; vocals; rhythm guitar; acoustic guitar; harmonica
- Years active: 1964–2020
- Label: Laneway

Ronald Robert Peel (9 August 1946 – 1 November 2020), also known by his stage name Rockwell T. James, was an Australian guitarist, singer, and songwriter.

Peel was a member of numerous bands, beginning with the Missing Links and the Pleazers in the mid-1960s, followed by the La De Da's from 1972 to 1975, and later performing in various backing bands for John Paul Young (1975–1979, 1983, 1986–2003). In 1977, he released a solo album, Shot of Rhythm and Blues, under the Rockwell T. James pseudonym, which produced his only top 40 single, "Roxanne". He also co-wrote "Rock Me Gently" (October 1976) for Sherbet, which became a top 10 hit for the group. Peel died in 2020 from cancer.

== Career ==
Peel began his career in music in the early 1960s as bass guitarist for Port Macquarie surf band the Mystics. In early 1964 Peel on bass guitar and harmonica and Mystics' lead guitarist Dave Boyne joined the Missing Links. The band members were known for their long unruly hair, destructive stage performances and pioneered the use of audio feedback and reverse tape effects in Australia. They had regular performances in Sydney and released a single, "We 2 Should Live" on Parlophone in March 1965; Peel had left by June.

Peel joined former Brisbane R&B band the Pleazers in mid-1965 in Sydney. With a New Zealand recording contract and a club residency, they soon relocated to Auckland where the group released hit singles and developed significant local following. Peel left the band in late 1966 and returned to Australia. Early in 1967 he briefly joined Ray Brown & the New Whispers on bass guitar, which became Ray Brown Three in mid-year.

Late in 1967 Peel launched his solo career under the pseudonym Rockwell T. James. His backing band the Rhythm Aces consisted of Lance Dixon on organ, Roger Felice-Andrews on drums (ex-Marty Rhone and the Soul Agents), Mike Freeman on trumpet, Ron Freeman on saxophone and Les Stacpool on guitar (ex-Chessmen, Merv Benton and the Tamlas). The ensemble released a single "Love Power" (1968) via Festival Records, which peaked at No. 52 on the Kent Music Report (retro-calculated) singles chart.

Peel relocated to the United Kingdom in 1970 and briefly joined Thunderclap Newman together with bandmate Felice-Andrews. That band broke up in April 1971 and he returned to Australia later that year. On bass guitar he joined One Ton Gypsy, an eight-piece jazz rock supergroup, led by former bandmate Brown. Other members variously included Chrissy Amphlett on vocals, Wayne Bennett on drums, Dave Fookes on drums and keyboards, Danny Gordon on backing vocals, Graham Lowndes on vocals and guitar, Alison MacCallum on vocals, Peter Martin on guitar, Dallas McDermott on bass guitar, Ray Oliver on guitar, Margret Piper on backing vocals, Tim Piper on guitar, Laurie Pryor on drums, Ray Rivamonte on piano, guitar and vocals, Linsday Wells on guitar and Paul Wyld on keyboards. Peel left in 1972 and One Ton Gypsy disbanded in 1973, without recording any material, due to maintenance costs for the extended line-up.

Peel on bass guitar and vocals was approached in late 1972 by R&B, boogie New Zealand group the La De Da's' founder Kevin Borich (guitar and vocals) and Keith Barber (drums) to rebuild the band as a trio. The reformed group released several recordings. In July 1973 the band's equipment truck was involved in a serious collision on the Hume Highway near Holbrook – both Peel and their roadie John Brewster were hospitalised and the group's gear was destroyed. Although the group were a top concert attraction, in early 1975 Borich decided to disband the group. Peel and Borich had joined vocalist Stevie Wright's Allstar Band in 1974 together with Johnny Dick on drums and Warren Morgan on keyboards (both ex-Billy Thorpe and the Aztecs).

In 1975 pop singer John Paul Young achieved his first Australian top 10 single with "Yesterday's Hero". To promote "Yesterday's Hero" and its allied album Hero he used the All Stars. The line-up included Peel on bass guitar from 1975 to 1979, Borich on guitar (1975–1976), Dick on drums (1975–1984) and Morgan on piano (1975, 1977–1984). He was recorded on Young's albums J.P.Y. (1976) and Green 1977). Thereafter Peel periodically returned to Young's backing bands throughout his career.

During 1976–1979 Peel resurrected his Rockwell T. James persona to release further singles and a solo album, A Shot of Rhythm and Blues (October 1977) on Razzle Records/Festival Records. Besides Peel on bass guitar, lead vocals, rhythm and acoustic guitars and harmonica, session musicians for the album were Sherbet members Harvey James on lead guitar, Tony Mitchell on lead guitar, Garth Porter on acoustic guitar and backing vocals and Alan Sandow on drums. The album was produced by Peel, Porter and Richard Lush. His most successful solo single "Roxanne" was co-written by Peel with Porter and Mitchell. It reached No. 39 on the Kent Music Report top 100 singles chart. "Rollin' On" (1978) was issued as a single and both its tracks were added to the album, which was re-issued in that year as Rollin' On. Peel had co-written "Rock Me Gently" (October 1976) for Sherbet with Mitchell, Porter, Sandow and Sherbet member Daryl Braithwaite, which reached No. 6 for that group.

Between gigs with the All Stars, Peel also performed with Scattered Aces during 1983 to 1984, with Paul DeMarco (a.k.a. Fred Zeppelin) on drums, Chris Turner on guitar and Peter Wells on guitar. The group issued a six-track extended play, Six Pack, on Big Rock Records in April 1984. They followed with a cover version of Eddie Cochran's 1958 song, "C'mon Everybody", as a single but they had broken up by mid-1984. He worked with DeMarco, Turner and Wells again in Slightly Shadey in 1987. In 2013 he formed duo the Rockwells with Bobby Fletcher. They released an album Cover Story in 2015. As of 2017 Peel and Fletcher were also members of Redback with Morgan on keyboards, Les Gully on drums and Grahame Perkins on bass guitar. Peel died on 1 November 2020 of an unspecified cancer. His funeral was held on 10 November and broadcast on-line due to COVID-19 restrictions limiting attendance.

== Discography ==
=== Albums ===
Rockwell T. James

- Shot of Rhythm and Blues (1977) Razzle/Festival
  - Rolin' On (reissue, 1978) Razzle Festival

=== Singles ===
Rockwell T. James and The Rhythm Aces

- "Love Power" (1968)

Rockwell T. James

- "Come on Home" (1976)
- "Roxanne" (1976)
- "Lady Blue" (1977)
- "That'll Be the Day" (1977)
- "Rollin' On" (1978)

Ronnie Peel and Mario Millo

- "Let It Go"/"Rebecca" (1979)
