= Lloyd Spiegel =

Australian blues guitarist, singer, and songwriter

- Born: Melbourne, Victoria, Australia
- Genres: Blues, folk, rock
- Occupations: Singer, songwriter, guitarist
- Instruments: Vocals, guitar
- Years active: 1989-present
- Label: Only Blues Music
- Member of: A'Court, Spiegel and Vinnick
- Formerly of: Midnight Special
- Website: www.lloydspiegel.com

Lloyd Spiegel is an Australian guitarist, songwriter and singer. He began performing at age of 10, has produced ten albums and collaborated on many other recordings both as artist and producer.

== Career ==
Spiegel took an interest in the blues when he was six years old and found an album by Sonny Terry Brownie McGhee in his father's record collection. His father took him to shows by Dutch Tilders and Geoff Achison and in about two years was playing in blues club bands. He was invited to the US by Brownie McGhee at age 16.

Spiegel won his first talent competition at the age of 10 and was playing regular gigs in Melbourne, Australia. At the age of 13 he formed his own band, Midnight Special, which he fronted from 1993 to 1998, and at 15 he recorded and produced his first CD. He has worked as a solo performer since 1996 performing at festivals and theatre venues all around the world, including extensive tours throughout Canada, the US, Japan, New Zealand and the Netherlands.

Since 2012, Spiegel is often accompanied by drummer Tim Burnham during his Australian tours. Burnham also appears on several of his albums. In 2019, Trombonist and vocalist Lisa Baird joined the show as a permanent member, having performed as a guest artist on Spiegel's recordings and shows for a number of years.

Since 2002, Spiegel has been the face of major Australian guitar brand Cole Clark Guitars. He has been a contributor in every aspect of the company's research and development and has four signature model guitars with the company.

== Discography ==
=== Solo albums ===
List of albums, with selected details
Title	Details
Lloyd Spiegel	Released: 1999; Format: CD; Label:
Live	Released: 2001; Format: CD; Label: Black Market Music (BMM 303.2)
Tall Stories	Released: 2004; Format: CD, digital; Label:
Timber & Steel	Released: 2006; Format: CD, digital; Label: Black Market Music (BMM 313.2)
Tangled Brew	Released: 2010; Format: CD, digital; Label: Black Market Music (BMM 351.2)
Double Live Set	Released: 2015; Format: 2×CD, digital; Label: Only Blues Music (LS0615)
This Time Tomorrow	Released: 2017; Format: digital; Label: Only Blues Music
Backroads	Released: 2018; Format: CD, digital, LP; Label: Only Blues Music (LS0518)
Cut and Run	Released: 2019; Format: CD, digital; Label: Only Blues Music (LS0819)
Bakehouse Dozen	Released: 2023; Format: CD, LP, digital; Label: Only Blues Music

=== DVD ===
List of albums, with selected details
Title	Details
Live In Japan	Released: 2005; Format: DVD

=== Collaborations ===
List of albums, with selected details
Title	Details
Stopping All Stations	Released: 1994; Format: CD; Artist: Midnight Special
A’Court, Spiegel and Vinnick	Released: 2023; Format: CD; Artist: ASV - A’Court, Spiegel and Vinnick.

== Awards and nominations ==
=== Blues Music Victoria Hall Of Fame ===
Inductee 2025

=== Blues And Roots Radio Worldwide ===
- Album of the year 2018

=== Australian Blues Awards ===
2005 Australian Blues Award;

- Band of the year

2015 Australian Blues Awards;

- Artist of the year
- Song of the year
- Producer of the year
- Album of the year

2017 Australian Blues Awards;

- Song of the year
- Album of the year

2019 Australian Blues Awards;

- Artist of the year
- Song of the year
- Producer of the year
- Album of the year

2020 Australian Blues Awards;

- Artist of the year
- Album of the year
- Producer of the year

=== Music Victoria Awards ===
The Music Victoria Awards are an annual awards night celebrating Victorian music. They commenced in 2006.

Year	Nominee / work	Award	Result	Ref.
Music Victoria Awards of 2017	This Time Tomorrow	Best Blues Album	Nominated	
Music Victoria Awards of 2018	Backroads	Best Blues Album	Nominated	
Music Victoria Awards of 2020	Cut and Run	Best Blues Album	Won	
2024 Music Victoria Awards	Lloyd Spiegel	Best Blues Work	Nominated	

=== Victorian Blues Music Awards ===
2004 VICTAS Blues Awards;

- Male artist of the year
- Song of the year
- Band of the year

2010 VICTAS Blues Awards;

- Male artist of the year
- Song of the year
- Producer of the year

2015 VICTAS Blues Awards;

- Album of the year
- Solo artist of the year
- Song of the year
- Best self produced album

2017 VICTAS Blues Awards

- Album of the year
- Song of the year
- Solo artist of the year

2018 VICTAS Blues Awards;

- Album of the year
- Artist of the year
- Song of the year

2019 Victorian Blues Music Awards;

- Solo artist of the year
- Artist of the year

2023 Victorian Blues Music Awards;

- Album of the year
- Solo artist of the year
- Song of the year
- Artist of the year
