= Kevin Borich Express =

Australian rock band

Kevin Borich Express are an Australian rock band formed in 1976 by the New Zealand-born Kevin Borich.

After the demise of New Zealand's successful band the La De Da's, Borich moved to Australia and formed the group Kevin Borich Express. It featured Harry Brus on bass guitar (ex-Blackfeather) and Barry Harvey on drums (Wild Cherries, Chain). They recorded a track, "The End of Me", before the line-up changed and Reuben San Fiansco took up bass guitar and Gil Matthews replaced Harvey on drums. Subsequent line-ups were typically a three piece with a succession of bass guitarist and drummers. They released their debut single, "Goin' Somewhere", in October using Fiansco and John Annas on drums, and followed this up with recording and releasing the band's debut album, Celebration! in 1977, replacing the bass part with riff master Tim Partridge (Mighty Kong, The Johnny Rocco Band). The album was critically acclaimed by the media and peaked in the top 30 on the Australian Music Charts.

In early 1977, Kevin Borich Express supported UK rock guitarist Jeff Beck, and later that year released their second album, Lonely One. This was followed in October with a Rockarena tour supporting Fleetwood Mac, Carlos Santana and Little River Band. Kevin Borich was invited to perform with Carlos Santana twice. Kevin Borich Express earned a support tour to the US with Australian heavy rockers AC/DC.

The Express then featured John Annas, Paul Christie and Tim Shafer, with this line-up recording the album No Turning Back, which was released in March 1979 and featured the hit title track of the same name. The album first charted on 19 March 1979, peaked at 48th position in Australia and stayed in the charts for nine weeks.

Tim Partridge and John Annas returned after Christie and Shafer moved on to other projects. Together with Borich they recorded another album, Live!, recorded by Australian broadcaster DoubleJJ which had recently acquired new mobile studio equipment and recorded two live performances in Melbourne Victoria and Wollongong New South Wales.

Kevin Borich Express toured the UK and Europe. They put together an album featuring tracks from across their recordings and released this compilation in Germany. After the tour, John Watson (Heavy Division) replaced Annas on drums and the band recorded Angel's Hand in November 1979. Similar line-up changes continued into the early 1980s with Michael Deep replacing Partridge in April 1980. In 1981 this line-up collaborated with Australian blues guitarist Dutch Tilders to record Blues Had a Baby and They Called It Rock'n'Roll, later released on RCA Records. Kerry Jacobsen from former ex-pat New Zealand band (Dragon) replaced Watson on drums, and the new line-up recorded Shy Boys Shy Girls.

In 1982, John Annas rejoined the Express on drums, Steve Balbi took up bass and for a short while Andy Cowan joined the now four piece band on keyboards. Later in 1982, Borich joined The Party Boys, touring with this Australian super band's ever changing line-up. He recorded on all their albums until 1989, when they disbanded.

Kevin Borich Express slowed down although didn't stop performing during the Borich era, helping to found, record and tour with The Party Boys from 1982 to 1989 with a reunion tour in 1999. They then took up full national and international touring again, using varying arrangements of Australia's best musicians that included Brus on bass and Borich's son Lucius Borich on drums, who would later form the progressive rock outfit Cog. Other line-ups would again feature John Annas with Ian Lees (ex-Moving Pictures) joining the rhythm section on bass guitar. John Watson was in and out of the line-up as required, and during the 2000s South Australia's Chris Finnen and Frank Lang worked the rooms with Borich for South Australian shows.

Kevin Borich Express recorded and released Live at the Big Kahuna in 1995 followed by another studio album in 1998 titled Heart Starter, this time with son Lucius on drums and Ben Rosen on bass. This was followed by the album Nomad in 2004. In 2009 Kevin Borich, Brus and Lucius Borich recorded Live at the Basement, in Sydney's The Basement venue in Circular Quay, a double CD and DVD under the banner Borich X Borich.

Borich recorded and released the studio album Totem on 28 May 2015, for which he toured in Australia with the current Kevin Borich Express line-up featuring Chris Gilbert on bass guitar and Jon Carson on drums. They performed a successful season at Adelaide Fringe Festival in March 2017.

== Discography ==
=== Albums ===
List of albums, with selected chart positions
Title	Album details	Peak chart positions
Title	Album details	AUS
Celebration	Released: March 1977; Label: Image (ILP757)	28
No Turning Back	Released: March 1979; Label: Mercury (6357 059)	48
Live	Released: 1979; Label: Image/Mushroom (L 37139); Note: Live album	-
The Blues Had a Baby	Released: November 1980; Label: Eureka (E 113)	96
Angel's Hand	Released: December 1980; Label: Image/Mushroom (L 37181)	92
Shy Boys Shy Girls	Released: 1982; Label: Image/Mushroom (L-20008)	-
The Best of The Kevin Borich Express	Released: 1988; Note: Greatest hits album	-
Live at the Big Kahuna	Released: 1995; Label: KB (666-2); Note: Live album	-
Heartstarter	Released: 1998; Label: Kevin Borich (888-2)	-
One Night Jamm Live	Released: 1999; Label: Kevin Borich (999-2); Note: Live album	-
