= You Need Professional Help =

Live album by the Party Boys
- Released: 11 November 1985
- Genre: Rock; blues rock
- Label: CBS
- Producer: The Party Boys

The Party Boys chronology
No Song Too Sacred (1984)	You Need Professional Help (1985)	The Party Boys (1987)

You Need Professional Help is a live album by the Australian rock band, the Party Boys. Their fourth album, it was released in 1985 on the label CBS.

== Background ==
The line-up for this release were founding members Kevin Borich and Paul Christie, plus the addition of Eagles' guitarist, Joe Walsh, Dragon's lead vocalist Marc Hunter and former Divinyls drummer Richard Harvey. Following the tradition set by the band's other albums, this was a live album recorded during a national tour and features no original tracks. However, some tracks were the players' own work, such as "Rocky Mountain Way" from Walsh's 1973 album The Smoker You Drink, The Player You Get, "Rock 'n' Roll is a Loser's Game", a Hunter song from his album Big City Talk and "Don't Let Go", a Kevin Borich Express song. "Duelling Guitars" may qualify as an 'original' and was presumably created as a crowd-pleaser by Borich and Walsh. Artists covered by the band on this album include Bruce Springsteen, Eagles and Jimi Hendrix. You Need Professional Help was recorded at the Moby Dick Surf Club in Whale Beach, New South Wales.

== Track listing ==
1. "The Shape I'm In" (Robbie Robertson)
2. "Life in the Fast Lane" (Joe Walsh, Don Henley, Glenn Frey)
3. "Cover Me" (Bruce Springsteen)
4. "Don't Let Go" (Kevin Borich, Paige)
5. "Fire" (Jimi Hendrix)
6. "Rock N' Roll is a Loser's Game" (Marc Hunter)
7. "Duelling Guitars" (Kevin Borich, Joe Walsh)
8. "You Got to Move" (Mick Jagger, Keith Richards)
9. "Rocky Mountain Way" (Rocke Grace, Kenny Passarelli, Joe Vitale, Joe Walsh)

== Personnel ==
- Marc Hunter - lead vocals
- Joe Walsh - guitar, lead vocals tracks 2 & 9
- Kevin Borich - guitar, lead vocals tracks 4 & 5
- Paul Christie - bass
- Richard Harvey - drums
