= She's a Mystery =

She's a Mystery may refer to:

- "She's a Mystery", a song by Bon Jovi from Crush
- "She's a Mystery", a song by Journey from Eclipse
- "She's a Mystery", a song by Kenny Rogers from Kenny
- "She's a Mystery", a song by the Party Boys from The Party Boys
- "She's a Mystery", a song by Becker from the soundtrack to the film, Longshot
