= Greatest Hits (of Other People) =

Live album by the Party Boys
- Released: 1983
- Genre: Rock
- Label: Oz
- Producer: Keith Walker

The Party Boys chronology
Live at Several 21sts (1983)	Greatest Hits (of Other People) (1983)	No Song Too Sacred (1984)

Greatest Hits (of Other People) is the second album by Australian rock band the Party Boys. It was recorded live during a tour in 1983.

== Track listing ==
1. I'm a Rocker
2. I Fought the Law
3. Highway Chile
4. Runaway
5. Sweet Emotion
6. Sugar Shack
7. Stealer
8. Street Fighting Man
9. Mercury Blues
10. Rainy Day Woman No's 12 & 35

== Credits ==
- Richard Clapton – vocals
- Kevin Borich – guitar, vocals track 3
- Paul Christie – bass, drums track 6, harmonica, vocals
- Graham Bidstrup – drums, bass track 6, vocals
- Harvey James – guitar, bass track 10, vocals
- Don Raffaele – saxophone
- Mixed by Mark Opitz
