= The Party Boys =

Australian rock supergroup

- Origin: Sydney, New South Wales, Australia
- Genres: Rock; hard rock
- Years active: 1982–1992, 1999, 2011
- Labels: Oz; EMI; CBS; Columbia; Epic
- Past members: See "Members"

The Party Boys were an Australian rock supergroup with a fluctuating lineup that began in 1982. The group was formed by Mondo Rock bass guitarist Paul Christie and guitarist Kevin Borich (formerly of the La De Da's and the Kevin Borich Express) as a part-time project for professional musicians during breaks from their main bands. Over time, the lineup included members of Status Quo, the Angels, Sherbet, Skyhooks, Rose Tattoo, the Choirboys, Australian Crawl, Divinyls, Models, Dragon and Swanee, as well as international artists such as Joe Walsh, Eric Burdon, and Graham Bonnet.

In March 1983, their debut album, Live at Several 21sts, peaked at number 9 on the Australian Kent Music Report Albums Chart. In June 1987, they reached number 1 on the same chart with their cover of John Kongos's hit "He's Gonna Step On You Again", which also peaked at number 10 on the New Zealand Singles Chart.

== Early line-ups ==
Paul Christie is the bass guitarist for Australian rock group Mondo Rock; he left the band in 1982, rejoining in 2003. He put together the first line-up of the Party Boys in Sydney with fellow founding member and guitarist Kevin Borich, as Christie had extensively toured the US playing bass guitar with Borich from 1978 to 1979 as a member of Kevin Borich Express, along with Harvey James (Mississippi, Ariel, Sherbet), and drummer Graham "Buzz" Bidstrup, who had recently left the Angels. Australian Crawl vocalist James Reyne was in Sydney shooting the TV mini-series Return to Eden and agreed to play some shows between filming. The band did a short run of shows performing cover songs chosen by various members. Recordings made of these gigs became the basis for the group's album Live at Several 21sts. When Reyne's filming schedule was over, he returned to his work with Australian Crawl in Melbourne and left the band. In March 1983, the album reached No. 9 on the Australian Kent Music Report Albums Chart and spawned the single "Bitch", a cover of one of the Rolling Stones' album tracks from 1971's Sticky Fingers. Christie, Borich, and James were encouraged to continue with the project.

Richard Clapton was brought in as Reyne's replacement on vocals and Don Raffaele joined on saxophone. The band toured the east coast, again playing only covers from artists including Bob Dylan, Aerosmith and the Rolling Stones. A second live album, Greatest Hits (of Other People) (1983) was the result of that tour and the Bobby Fuller Four cover single, "I Fought the Law", was issued in November. Clapton and James left the group. Greatest Hits (of Other People) peaked at No. 25. The singer for the next tour was former Skyhooks vocalist and TV personality Graeme "Shirley" Strachan, with Rose Tattoo guitarist Robin Riley replacing James; this version of the band produced the album No Song Too Sacred, yet another live album of covers. The related single, "Kashmir", was a Led Zeppelin song.

The band's 1984/85 line-up saw Strachan, Riley, and drummer Matthew Wenban replaced by Marc Hunter from Dragon, ex-Divinyls drummer Richard Harvey and United States guitarist, Joe Walsh (ex-Eagles). The sold-out national tour, including three shows at the Old Lion Hotel in Adelaide in December 1984, that followed, formed the basis of the album You Need Professional Help that featured an extended guitar duel between Walsh and Borich on Walsh's track "Rocky Mountain Way".

In 1986, Christie, Borich and Harvey teamed up with Rose Tattoo lead singer Angry Anderson, guitarist John Brewster from the Angels and ex–Status Quo bassist Alan Lancaster to form a new version of the Party Boys. With Lancaster on bass, Christie switched to drums so the band now had two drummers. No recording was made of this line-up and following the tour, Anderson left.

== The Swanee years ==
By 1987, Anderson was replaced by John Swan, ushering in the Party Boys' most successful period. Their first release with Swan was a cover of the John Kongos hit "He's Gonna Step on You Again", a song that was reportedly also being considered as a comeback release for John Paul Young at around the same time (though Young did not record the track). In June, the single reached No. 1 on the Kent Music Report singles chart, and briefly registered on the UK Singles Chart at No. 92. In December that year, it was followed by the band's first ever studio album, the self-titled The Party Boys, which featured six original tracks, plus covers of AC/DC, Argent, the Angels, Them and La De Da's songs. The Argent tune, "Hold Your Head Up", was issued as a single in November, which peaked at No. 19. However Swan left the band for contractual reasons and to work on a film, Chase the Moon, which was never completed.

Swan was briefly replaced by Graham Bonnet, the UK singer who had recorded with an array of bands including the Marbles, Rainbow and Alcatrazz and who had enjoyed solo success as a solo artist in the 1970s. After only five performances, however, Bonnet left and Swan returned. In February 1988 the group supported AC/DC's first Australian tour in seven years. Swan left after these shows, having served the longest continuous period as the band's singer, broken only by Bonnet's two week tenure. Walsh returned to the band during a brief Australian visit and the group recorded a single, "Follow Your Heart" which was released in March 1989. The new line-up were Christie, Borich, Walsh, and American Calvin Welch on bass guitar with Hamish, Fergus and Angus Richardson on backing vocals.

== Later years ==
In June–July 1989, the Party Boys toured with Eric Burdon. Burdon is often listed as the Party Boys' seventh vocalist, however a Burdon fansite suggests that they were his backing group on the Australian leg of his tour promoting the 1988 solo album, I Used to Be an Animal. The line-up for this version was Burdon, Christie, Mal Eastick on guitar (Stars), Mal Logan on keyboards (Healing Force, Renée Geyer Band) and Warren McLean on drums (Machinations, I'm Talking). Garry Raffaele of The Canberra Times caught their July gig in Queanbeyan, "a two-hour concert which certainly rocked along — loud, aggressive, brash, with the odd nod in the direction of John Lee Hooker, Jerry Lee Lewis, Richie Valens, Memphis Slim". Most of the material "was Animal territory revisited — 'House of the Rising Sun', 'We've Got to Get Out of This Place', some of the hits now a touch over 20 years old. Done with a direct, outgoing joy that almost carried off the night. But not quite. Even rock and roll; the wild child of music, needs the hills and valleys, the peaks and troughs".

By late 1989, the Party Boys had become Christie, Ross Wilson (Daddy Cool, Mondo Rock) on vocals, guitarist Stuart Fraser (Noiseworks, Swanee), Dorian West on bass guitar, Adrian Cannon on drums, Brett Jacobson on drums, and backing vocalists Kevin Bennett and Alex Smith. A version of Manfred Mann's "Do Wah Diddy Diddy" was recorded but Wilson's vocals had to be replaced due to contractual obligations. Vince Contarino of Adelaide Led Zeppelin tribute band the Zep Boys re-recorded the lead vocal track and the single became a No. 24 Australian hit in early 1990.

Christie continued to tour with various line-ups until 1992. Other musicians to pass through the band included guitarists Brad Carr (ex-Choirboys) and Steve Williams (ex–Wa Wa Nee), former AC/DC bass guitarist Mark Evans and ex-Models and Mondo Rock drummer Barton Price. In September 1992, the band (featuring the 1987 line-up) released a cover of the Billy Preston song "That's the Way God Planned It" before coming to an end. After his time with the Party Boys, Christie became an artist manager for the Breed, Julieanne Henry, and Tamam Shud.

The Party Boys was revived for some shows in 1999 with Christie, Price, ex-Angels members James Morley and Bob Spencer and singer Mark Gable. In January 2011, a version of the band, Kevin Borich's Party Boyz, performed a series of live dates for the Back From Exile Tour with the line-up: Angry Anderson, John 'Swanee' Swan, Kevin Borich, Izzy Osmanovic (from the Screaming Jets), Harry Brus and Mick Skelton.

== Members ==
- Graham Bidstrup – drums (1982–1984)
- Kevin Borich – guitar, vocals (1982–1989, 1999, 2011)
- Paul Christie – bass guitar, drums, backing vocals (1982–1992, 1999, 2011)
- Harvey James – guitar, backing vocals (1982–1983)
- James Reyne – vocals (1982–1983)
- Richard Clapton – vocals, guitar (1983–1984)
- Don Raffael – saxophone (1983)
- Gil Matthews – drums (1984)
- Richard Harvey – drums (1984–1988, 1999; died 2022)
- Marc Hunter – vocals (1984; died 1998)
- Robin Riley – guitar (1984)
- Matthew Wenban – drums (1984)
- Graeme "Shirley" Strachan – vocals (1984–1986; died 2001)
- Joe Walsh – guitar (1984–1986, 1989)
- Angry Anderson – vocals (1986–1987, 1999, 2011; died 2026)
- John Brewster – guitar, backing vocals (1986–1992, 1999)
- Alan Lancaster – bass guitar, vocals (1986–1987, 1992; died 2021)
- John Swan – vocals (1987, 1987–1989, 1992, 1999, 2011)
- Graham Bonnet – vocals (1987)
- Brad Carr – guitar (1988, 1990)
- Barton Price – drums (1988–1989)
- Brett Jacobson – drums (1989, 1990)
- Hamish Angus – guitar (1989)
- Eric Burdon – vocals (1989)
- Hanuman Dass – drums (1989)
- Mal Eastick – guitar (1989)
- Mal Logan – keyboards (1989)
- Warren McLean – drums (1989; died 2021)
- Sam McNally – keyboards, bass guitar (1989)
- Fergus Richardson – keyboards, vocals (1989)
- Calvin Welch – drums (1989–1990)
- Ross Wilson – vocals (1989–1990)
- Kevin Bennett – backing vocals (1989–1990)
- Adrian Cannon – drums (1989–1990)
- Vince Contarino – vocals (1990)
- Mark Evans – bass guitar (1990)
- Stuart Fraser – guitar (1989–1990)
- Alex Smith – backing vocals (1989–1990)
- Dorian West – bass guitar (1989–1992)
- Doc Neeson – vocals (1987–1988; died 2014)
- Steve Williams – guitar (1990)
- John Zak – drums (1990–1992)
- James Morley – bass guitar (1999)
- Bob Spencer – guitar (1999)
- Mark Gable – vocals (1999)
- Harry Brus – bass guitar (2011)
- Mick O'Shea – drums (2011)
- Izzy Osmanovic – guitar, vocals (2011)
- Mick Skelton – drums (2011)

== Discography ==
=== Studio albums ===
Title	Detais	Peak chart positions		Certification
Title	Detais	AUS KMR	NZL	Certification
The Party Boys	Released: 13 November 1987; Label: Epic Records (EPC 460485 1, EPC 460485 4, EPC 460485 4); Formats: LP, cassette, CD; Producer: Alan Lancaster, John Brewster	18	41	ARIA: Gold

=== Compilation albums ===
Year	Title	Peak chart positions
Year	Title	AUS ARIA
The Party Boys Rage Album	Released: 1985; Label: CBS; Formats: LP	-
Greatest Hits, Misses, B-Sides and Rarities	Released: 4 September 1992; Label: Columbia; Formats: CD	182

=== Live albums ===
Title	Details	Peak chart positions
Title	Details	AUS KMR
Live at Several 21sts	Released: March 1983; Label: Oz (Australia), EMI (Oz/EMI OZS.1016); Formats: LP; Engineer: Keith Walker	9
Greatest Hits (of Other People)	Released: November 1983; Label: Oz Records; Formats: LP; Engineer: Mark Opitz	25
No Song Too Sacred	Released: September 1984; Label: Oz Records , CBS; Formats: LP; Engineer: Spencer Lee; Producer: Paul Christie	61
You Need Professional Help	Released: 11 November 1985; Label: CBS; Formats: LP; Engineer: Spencer Lee	96

=== Singles ===
Year	Title	Peak chart positions				Album
Year	Title	AUS KMR	AUS ARIA	NZL RIANZ	UK UK	Album
1983	"Bitch"	100	—	—	—	Live at Several 21sts
1983	"I Fought the Law"	—	—	—	—	Greatest Hits (of Other People)
1984	"Kashmir"	—	—	—	—	No Song Too Sacred
1987	"He's Gonna Step On You Again"	1	—	10	92	The Party Boys
1987	"Hold Your Head Up"	21	—	42	—	The Party Boys
1987	"Is This the Way to Say Goodbye"	—	—	—	—	The Party Boys
1988	"Gloria"	—	—	—	—	The Party Boys
1989	"Follow Your Heart"	94	107	—	—	Non-album singles
1990	"Do-Wah-Diddy"^{[A]}	73	81	—	—	Non-album singles
1992	"That's the Way God Planned It"	132	—	—	—	Non-album singles
"—" denotes a recording that did not chart or was not released in that territory.

== Notes ==
A. "Do Wah Diddy Diddy" reached No. 73 on the Australian Music Report Singles Chart – successor to the Kent Music Report. Australian Recording Industry Association (ARIA) collated its own charts from mid-1988 and "Do Wah Diddy Diddy" reached No. 81 on the ARIA Singles Chart.
