= Cole Clark =

Australian musical instrument manufacturer

Cole Clark Guitars
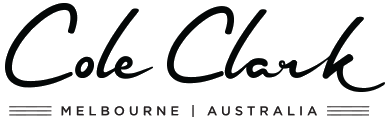
- Company type: Private
- Industry: Musical instrument
- Founded: 2001; 25 years ago
- Founder: Miles Jackson, Paul Dutton, William Pizzey, Adam Cole and Bradley Clark
- Headquarters: Melbourne, Australia
- Key people: Miles Jackson CEO
- Products: Acoustic guitars Acoustic electric Hybrid guitars Bass guitars Lap steel guitars Electric guitars
- Number of employees: 58
- Website: coleclarkguitars.com

Cole Clark is an Australian manufacturer of guitars and other fretted instruments. The company is based in Bayswater, Melbourne and was founded in 2001. Cole Clark uses unique construction and designs, advanced live pickup technology and have a strong focus on sustainably sourced timbers.

== Materials ==
Cole Clark guitars are made almost entirely using Australian indigenous timbers. Solid timber is used in preference to plywood. Top timbers span equally across Bunya Pine, Australian Blackwood and Australian Grown Californian Redwood as top sellers, with small numbers of Spruce, Mahogany and Huon Pine. Back and side timbers include Australian Blackwood, Queensland Maple, Silky Oak, European Maple and Maple Silkwood.

The company has been compelled to replace endangered fretboard timbers like rosewood and ebony with alternatives such as Blackbean and Sheoak.

== Products ==
Primarily, Cole Clark produce acoustic guitars, but also venture into electric guitars, lapsteels and bass. Previously the company has produced ukuleles. These are currently not in production.

The Cole Clark acoustic range includes the FL Dreadnought models in 6 and 12 string, AN grand auditorium and LL travel guitar. The timber combination possibilities mean that the above models have up to 30 different combinations and back and side timber, hence a different product name.

FL and AN models are available in 1, 2 and 3 series. Each with varying levels of features. The LL is available only in a 1 and 2 series.

In a joint venue with Melbourne bass maker Neil Kennedy, Cole Clark released the ‘LLBN’ electric bass line in 2017.

Cole Clark uses a patented ‘3-way’ pickup system that combines three elements (under saddle piezo assembly, face brace sensor, and a condenser mic) that work together, hearing only frequencies they are best equipped to handle to deliver less ‘quack’ and ‘ping’ that the average acoustic pickup and eliminating many of the feedback issues associated with such instruments.

In 2019 Cole Clark released a series of Acoustic Guitars with additional Humbucker Pickups as a second output, giving the guitars the ability to switch between acoustic and electric tones as well as blend the two together with the flick of a switch. They come in FL, LL, AN, FL 12 string and the Lloyd Spiegel signature model.

In 2023, Cole Clark released their next generation ‘True Hybrid’ models, featuring dual outputs for both acoustic and full electric pickup configurations.

== Factory fire ==
At midday on 27 August 2013, a fire devastated the Cole Clark factory, halting production for almost a year.

== Artists ==
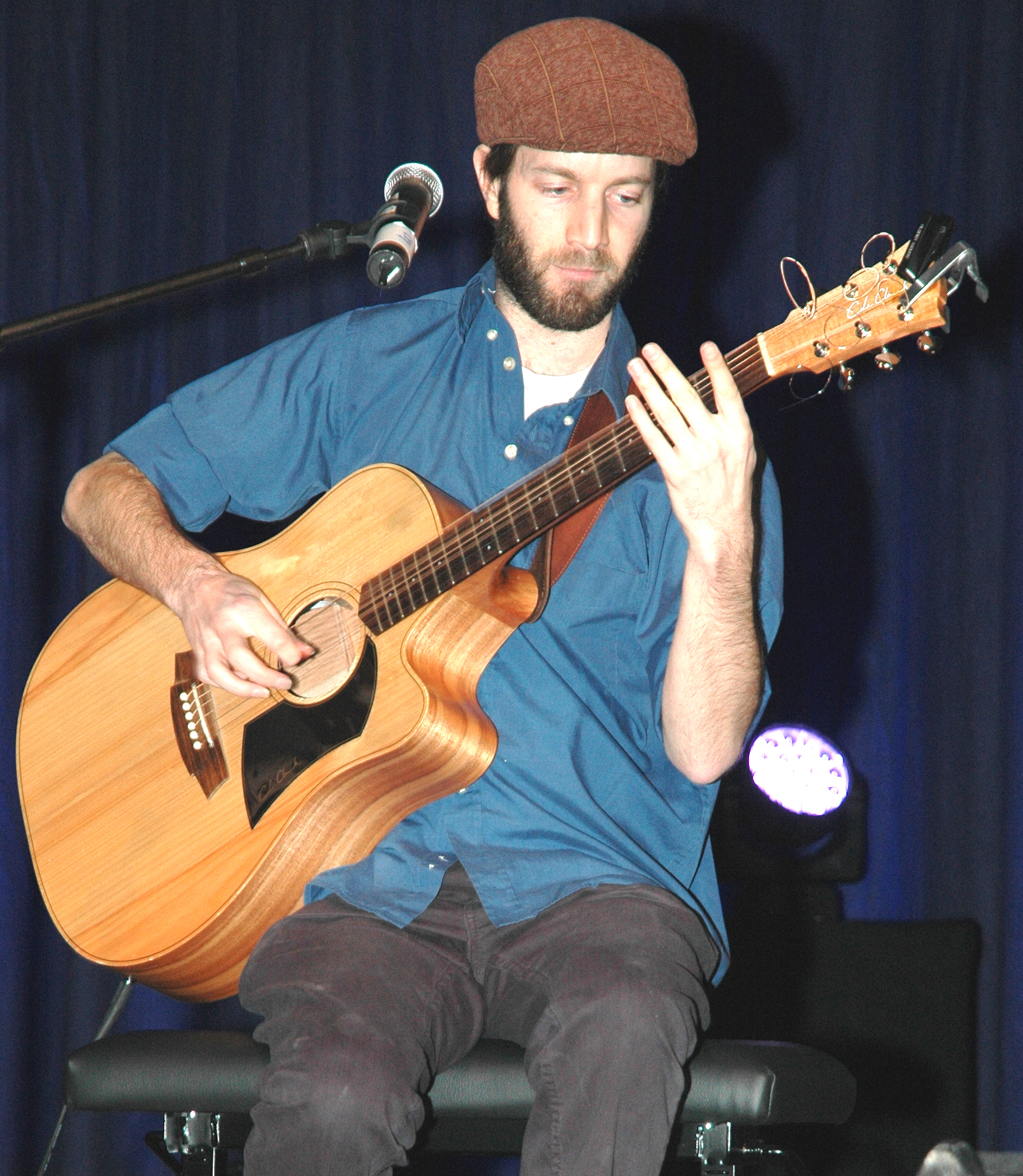
Cole Clark guitar played by Tim McMillan

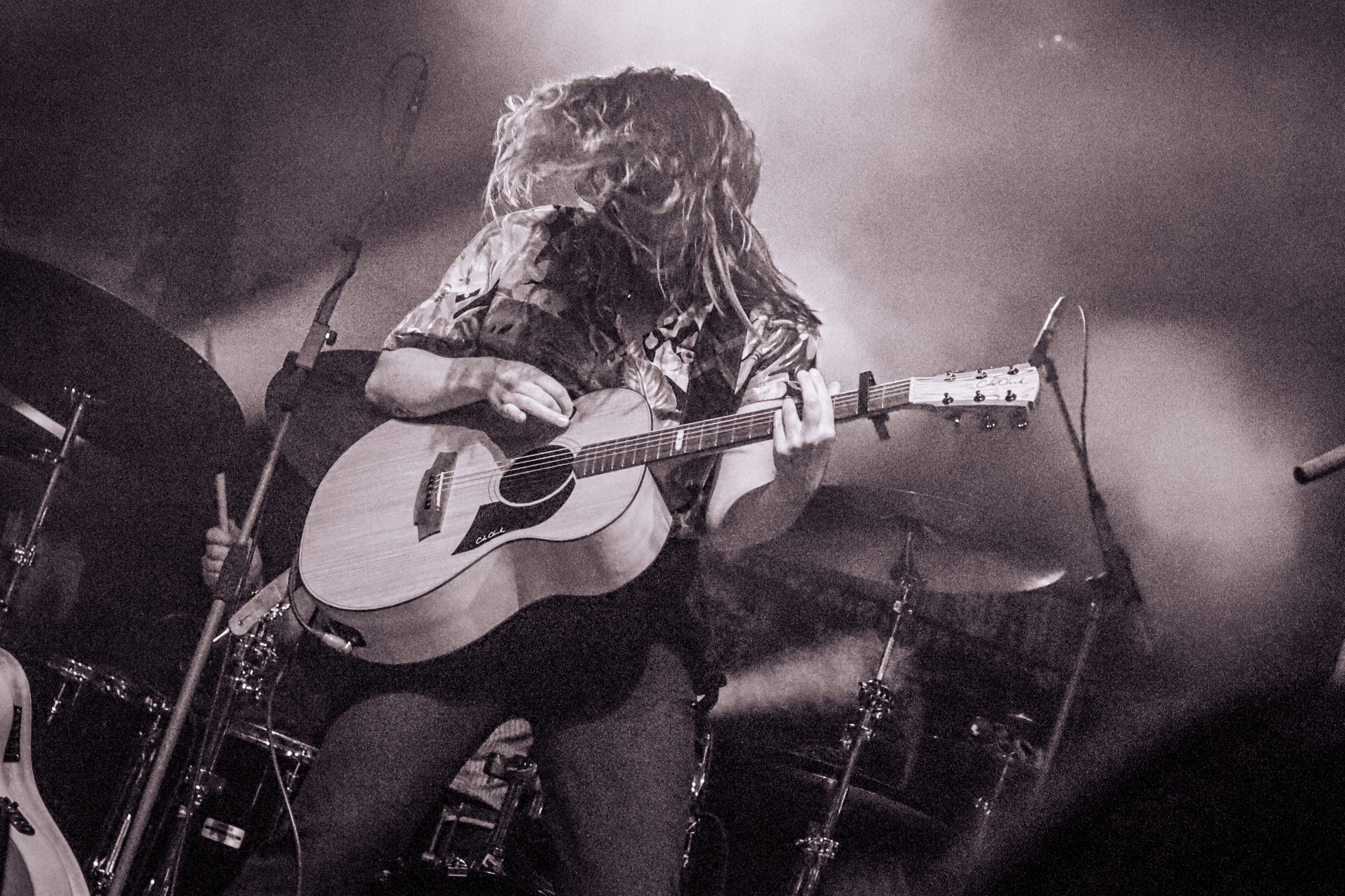
Hanne Kah with her Cole Clark Angel Custom Guitar

Some notable artists that use and endorse Cole Clark guitars include:

- Pete Murray
- 5 Seconds of Summer
- Walk off the earth
- Patrick Rondat
- Lloyd Spiegel
- Ben Harper
- Jack Johnson
- Omar Rodríguez-López
- Xavier Rudd
- Angus & Julia Stone
- Nahko and Medicine for the People
- Lime Cordiale
- Snow Patrol
- Karnivool
- Reece Mastin
- Alex Lloyd
- Tim Rogers
- James Blundell
- Hanne Kah
- Paulinho Saponga

== See also ==
- Maton
- Manufacturing in Australia
