= Geoff Achison =

- Born: Geoffrey Raymond Achison; 5 August 1965 (age 60); Cowes, Phillip Island, Victoria, Australia
- Genres: Blues, soul, funk, blues rock, jazz, acoustic blues
- Occupations: Musician, songwriter
- Instruments: Guitar, vocals, bass guitar, double bass
- Years active: 1989 present
- Labels: Jupiter 2 Records, Zyx, Black Market Music
- Formerly of: Dutch Tilders
- Website: www.geoffachison.com

Geoff Achison (born 5 August 1965 in Cowes on Phillip Island in the Gippsland region of Victoria, Australia) is an independent Australian Melbourne-based singer/songwriter guitarist, whose artistic focus is of the blues, blues rock and soul genres. He performs in two modes – as a solo artist performing and singing with acoustic guitar, and bandleader as a singer/electric guitarist.

== Career ==
Achison performed as lead guitarist for Dutch Tilders between 1989 and 1996, before beginning to feature as a solo artist. He appeared in many festivals in Australia, including:

- Echuca Moama Winter Blues
- Australian Blues Music Festival
- Port Fairy Folk Festival
- Wangaratta Jazz Festival
- Sydney Blues Festival 2010, 2015
- Bendigo Blues & Roots Music Festival
- Bruthen Blues & Arts Festival
- Manly Jazz Festival 1998/99;
- the Thredbo Blues Festivals of 2011, and 2001, 1995–98 performing as the "Classically Blue" Trio with violinist Adrian Keating and bass player Steve Sampson;
- the Sydney Festival's 2001 'Jazz in the Domain' performing as 'Classically Blue'.

After performing with Dutch Tilders, Achison formed his band 'the Souldiggers' and produced his first album, Big Machine in 1994. It is featured in the National Library of Australia. By 2002, membership of 'The Souldiggers' included Gerry Pantazis and two ex-members of Little River Band: bassist Roger McLachlan, and keyboardist Mal Logan.

Achison has been an instructor at Fur Peace Ranch guitar camp run by Jorma Kaukonen each year since 1998, and has featured in a live performance with the Allman Brothers.

He currently plays a Lichty Guitars acoustic instrument when performing in the US. In Australia, Achison plays Cole-Clark acoustic guitars.

== Awards ==
In 1995 the Melbourne Blues Appreciation Society sent Achison to the Memphis International Blues Challenge, where he won the Albert King Award for the most promising guitarist of the finals. He received a Gibson Nighthawk guitar and signed an endorsement contract with Gibson Guitar Corporation following the event.

He was awarded London-based Jazz FM's Album of the Month in 1999, for Mystery Train. Achison, along with the Souldiggers, won 'Group of the Year' at the 2007 Australian Blues Music 'Chain' Awards.

In 2007, Little Big Men won Kweevak Music Magazine's Readers' Choice awards., and in 2008, 'Guitar Player' magazine's readers' poll listed Achison as one of the top 10 Hot New Guitarists.

The Melbourne Blues Appreciation Society has awarded Achison 'Male Artist of the Year', 'Album of the Year', 'Song of the Year' and 'Band of the Year' 2012.

== Discography ==
| Band | Album | Date | Label | Notes |
|---|---|---|---|---|
| Dutch Tilders & The Blues Club | Blues Is My Life | 1989 | Blues Club Records | |
| Dutch Tilders & The Blues Club | Real Australian Blues Vol 1 (compilation) | 1992 | | |
| Dutch Tilders & The Blues Club | Live at the Station | 1995 | Blues Club Records | |
| Dutch Tilders & The Blues Club | One More Time | 2001 | Independent | |
| Classically Blue | Classically Blue | 1994 | Larrikin | with Violinist Adrian Keating, Sydney Souldiggers Tim Sampson Bass, Julia Day Drums and String Quartet |
| Classically Blue | You Get That | 1998 | Larrikin | with Violinist Adrian Keating, Sydney Souldiggers Tim Sampson Bass, Julia Day Drums and String Quartet |
| Classically Blue | Classically Blue 'Live at the Basement' DVD/CD | 2012 | Jupiter 2 Records | with Violinist Adrian Keating, Sydney Souldiggers Tim Sampson Bass, Julia Day Drums and String Quartet |
| Geoff Achison Band | Big Machine | 1994 | Jupiter 2 Records/Larrikin | |
| Geoff Achison Band | Genevieve | 1995 | Jupiter 2 Records | |
| Geoff Achison Band | Real Australian Blues Vol 3 (compilation) | 1997 | | |
| Geoff Achison (solo acoustic) | Real Australian Blues Vol 2 (compilation) | 1993 | | |
| Geoff Achison (solo acoustic) | Mystery Train | 1996 | Jupiter 2 Records/Newmarket | |
| Geoff Achison (solo acoustic) | Acho Solo | 2007 | Jupiter 2 Records | |
| Geoff Achison (solo acoustic) | Live at Burrinja Cafe | 2011 | Jupiter 2 Records | |
| Geoff Achison (solo acoustic) | Don't Play Guitar Boy | 2024 | Jupiter 2 Records | |
| Geoff Achison | Sovereign Town | 2018 | Jupiter 2 Records | Geoff Achison - Vocals, Guitars Andrew Fry - Upright Bass Dave Clark - Drums Liam Kealy - Hammond Organ John McNamara - Backing Vocals |
| Geoff Achison & The Souldiggers | Gettin' Evil | 1999 (US) | Jupiter 2 Records | |
| Geoff Achison & The Souldiggers | Live at St Andrews | 2000 (Aus) | Jupiter 2 Records | |
| Geoff Achison & The Souldiggers | Souldiggin' In The UK | 2001 | Powerhouse Records | |
| Geoff Achison & The Souldiggers | Chasing My Tail | 2002 (UK) | Jupiter 2 Records | |
| Geoff Achison & The Souldiggers | Each Long Day | 2002 (UK) | Powerhouse Records | |
| Geoff Achison & The Souldiggers | Little Big Men | 2005 (Aus) | Jupiter 2 Records | |
| Geoff Achison & The Souldiggers | Souldiggin' DVD/CD | 2005 (Aus) | Jupiter 2 Records | |
| Geoff Achison & The Souldiggers | One Ticket One Ride | 2009 (US) | Jupiter 2 Records/Black Market Music | |
| Geoff Achison & The Souldiggers | Live at Guitars Across The Bay | 2010 (Aus) | Jupiter 2 Records | |
| Geoff Achison & The Souldiggers | 20th Anniversary Concert double disc DVD/CD set | 2014 (Aus) | Jupiter 2 Records | |
| Geoff Achison & The Souldiggers | 20th Anniversary UK | 2019 (UK) | Jupiter 2 Records | |
| Geoff Achison & The Souldiggers | Eyes On The Prize (Single) | 2020 | Jupiter 2 Records | |
| Geoff Achison & The Souldiggers | Dragon Wings (Single) | 2020 | Jupiter 2 Records | |
| Geoff Achison & The Souldiggers | Footy Cards (Single) | 2020 | Jupiter 2 Records | |
| Geoff Achison & The Souldiggers | Secret To Life (Single) | 2022 | Jupiter 2 Records | |
| Geoff Achison & The Souldiggers | Capricorn Pilot (Single) | 2022 | Jupiter 2 Records | |
| Randall Bramblett & Geoff Achison | Jammin' In The Attic | 2010 (US) | Hittin' The Note Records | |
| Chris Wilson & Geoff Achison | Box of Blues | 2012 | Jupiter 2 Records | Feat: Chris Wilson – Geoff Achison – Mal Logan – Roger McLachlan – Gerry Pantazis with Shannon Bourne & Kerri Simpson |
| Other Appearances | Hot Tuna: 2000-11-15 The Birchmere, Alexandria, VA | 2000 | | Features on the encore track 'I Just Want To Make Love To You' |

== Awards and nominations ==
=== Music Victoria Awards ===
The Music Victoria Awards is an annual awards ceremony celebrating Victorian music.

| Year | Nominee / work | Award | Result |
|---|---|---|---|
| Music Victoria Awards of 2013 | Box of Blues (with Geoff Achison ) | Best Blues Albums | Nominated |
