= Dutch Tilders =

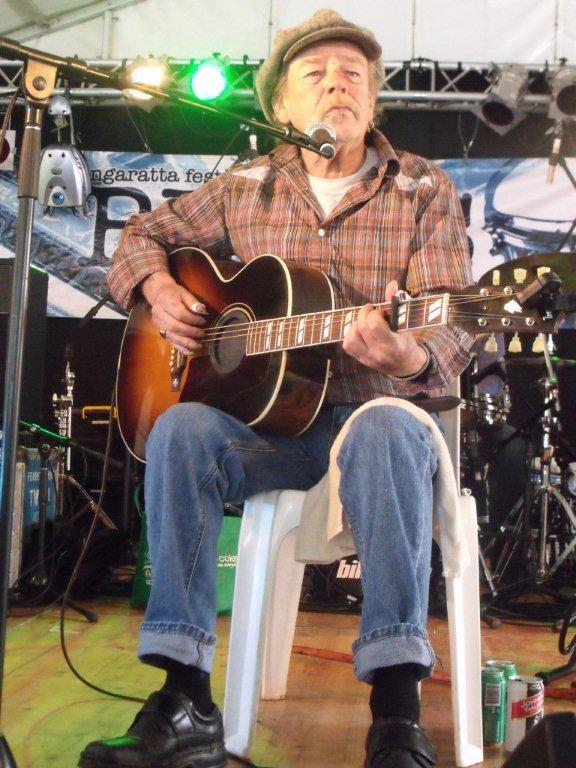
- Dutch Tilders performing at the Wangaratta Festival of Jazz, October 2010

Background information
- Also known as: Matthew Tilders
- Born: Mattheus Frederikus Wilhelmus Tilders; 29 August 1941; Nijmegen, Netherlands
- Origin: Melbourne, Australia
- Died: 23 April 2011 (aged 69) Melbourne, Victoria, Australia
- Genres: Blues, folk, jazz
- Occupations: Singer-songwriter, musician
- Instruments: Vocals, guitar (electric, acoustic), harmonica
- Years active: 1956–2011
- Labels: Bootleg/Fable, Jazznote, Eureka/Electric, Empire/MGM
- Website: dutchtilders.com.au

Dutch Tilders (29 August 1941 – 23 April 2011), born Mattheus Frederikus Wilhelmus Tilders, anglicised as Matthew Tilders, was a Netherlands-born Australian blues singer-songwriter and guitarist. He performed and released material as a solo artist and also issued a blues-rock album with Kevin Borich, The Blues Had a Baby and They Called It Rock'n'Roll (November 1980). He has toured with John Mayall (1974), Brownie McGhee (1976, 1980s), and Taj Mahal (1986, 1990s). Tilders was diagnosed with oesophageal and liver cancer in May 2010 and died on 23 April 2011, aged 69. In May 2012 Australian Guitar magazine listed him in the top 40 on their Definitive Australian Guitarists of All Time.

== Biography ==
Dutch Tilders was born on 29 August 1941 as Mattheus Frederikus Wilhelmus Tilders (anglicised as Matthew Frederick William Tilders) in Nijmegen, Netherlands. His father was Frederikus Theodorus Tilders (born 25 July 1913) and his mother was Cathiarina Maria (née Luermans, born 7 November 1909), his younger siblings are Wilhelmus (born 2 October 1942); Johanna (born 30 May 1944); Frederikus (born 17 December 1945); Johannes (born 30 December 1947); and Bartholomeus (born 27 October 1951). From the age of ten, Tilders was a member of the local church choir. After his voice broke he sang baritone and falsetto and joined his secondary school's choir.

The Tilders family emigrated to Melbourne, Australia, in 1955 aboard the SS Fairsea. Frederikus worked as a furniture upholsterer. The family spent about a year at the Brooklyn Migrant Hostel, where Tilders worked at a local timber yard, before they moved to Frankston. As a child Tilders had sung choral music, but later he moved towards blues music, his first paying gig was on harmonica at the Collingwood Town Hall at the age of 15, at a concert also featuring Johnny O'Keefe.

In 1959, Tilders bought his first guitar, to be able to accompany himself when playing in cafes around Melbourne. His early influences were Big Bill Broonzy, Mississippi John Hurt and Blind Blake. In 1961 he recorded a 10" album at a friend's home studio. The following year he formed a duo with Shane Duckham on harmonica and they worked in the Sydney folk and blues circuit. During the mid-to-late 1960s Tilders performed less frequently.

In September 1970, Tilders appeared on TV talent show New Faces and was signed by one of the judges, Ron Tudor, to his Bootleg Records label. Tilders released his self-titled debut album in 1972 with Brian Cadd producing and backing provided by members of Chain. Australian musicologist, Ian McFarlane, described the album, which "proved the man's mastery of the blues form. One side featured Tilders playing down-home Mississippi delta acoustic blues, the flip Chicago electric blues".

Tilders performed at the Sunbury Pop Festivals in both January 1973 and the following year. Later in 1974 he toured the United Kingdom supporting John Mayall; he also issued a split album with fellow blues-folk artist Margret RoadKnight, Australian Jazz of the 70s Vol. 5 The Blues Singers. The Canberra Times's Michael Foster described Tilders' contributions "[he] takes side one with a selection of eight blues, all but one his own work. Like Miss Roadknight he sings the basic, 12-bar blues and like her he gets well into the feeling and expression which gave birth to the form and feeling of the blues".

In the next year he used a backing band of Phil Colson on guitar (The Foreday Riders); Keith Dubber on trumpet and flugel horn; Rick Lock on drums (The Foreday Riders); John Power on bass guitar (Company Caine) and Don Reid on saxophone. They recorded his following album, Break. Tony Catterall for The Canberra Times noted his style "ranges from the intimate blues-in-a-smoke-filled-café-late-at-night feeling of 'Diddie Wa Diddie' and 'Just a Dream' ... to the sheer "happy picking" of his own '21st Birthday Rag'". "I'm a Mean Mistreater" was issued as a single from the album.

In 1976, Tilders supported tours by US blues duo, Sonny Terry and Brownie McGhee, and then by B.B. King. At their first gig King heard Tilders from backstage but had not seen him, King assumed that he was black and expressed surprise when the two were introduced. For Tilders' next album, Working Man, he used a backing band of Jim Conway on harmonica (The Captain Matchbox Whoopee Band); Ray Arnott on drums, John Dubois on bass guitar, and Kerryn Tolhurst on mandolin and dobro (all from The Dingoes); and Jeff King on dobro (The Foreday Riders).

Julie Meldrum of The Canberra Times said he "confirms his position as the top blues performer in Australia. He continues to show his remarkable talent, which has already earned him recognition from Sonny Terry and Brownie McGee ... [he] has added a rustic flavour which makes his style more accessible than before". In February 1977 the album provided a single, "Goodnight, Irene", which is a cover version of the Lead Belly 1933 blues standard.

In March 1978 he appeared on the Australian Broadcasting Corporation (ABC) TV series Rocturnal, following Richard Clapton. The Canberra Times's Bradley Wynne was impressed by Clapton and felt the "second best feature of the show was the mellow electric blues guitar" of Tilders "with that whisky Leadbelly voice". In January the following year Tilders recorded a direct to disc album, Direct, which appeared in May – it was the second Australian album issued using that process. He used a backing group of Conway with Bob Bertles on alto and soprano saxophones and Peter Howell on bass guitar with Lee Simmonds producing.

Luis Feliu's favourable review in The Canberra Times finds Direct has "a few instrumental [tracks], a couple of romping boogie rockers and some soothing blues stories. His style is studied, synthesised from that of the old masters". He compared it positively with work by Ry Cooder, Leon Redbone and Leo Kottke, where Tilders has "a strong faith in his music that gives blues lovers in Oz faith in him".

During the late 1970s, Tilders also fronted bands such as the Elks, the Cyril 'B' Bunter Band, and Mickey Finn. Tilders had formed a friendship with McGhee, who considered Tilders a genuine bluesman. McGhee was also collaborator and close friend of Big Bill Broonzy and the affinity between Tilders and McGhee led to several combined tours of Australian during the 1980s, generally accompanied by Conway. In 1980 his backing band was the R&B Six, which included Mick Elliott on guitar; Charley Elul on drums; Peter Frazer on saxophone; Dave Murray on bass guitar and vocals; and Suzanne Petersen on flute and vocals. Tilders and Petersen co-wrote "Tell Me How to Stop the Rain".

In August 1980, Tilders worked with Kevin Borich on lead vocals and lead guitar, and his backing group The Express, to record another direct to disc album, The Blues Had a Baby and They Called It Rock'n'Roll, as a blues-rock crossover. The Express line up were Michael Deep on bass guitar and John Watson on drums; they were joined in the studio by Bertles on saxophone.

The Australian Women's Weekly's Susan Moore described the album, which was issued in November, as "a vibrant blend of gruff, bluesy vocals and shivering, evocative guitar". Borich told Moore that the recording process meant "[i]f you blow the last note, you have to go back and start all over again ... We didn't want a clinical sound, we wanted a completely live feeling". The ensemble issued a single, "Bad Books", in April 1981. In June that year Tilders opened for Scottish comedian, Billy Connolly.

In September 1986, and again during the 1990s, Tilders toured with Taj Mahal. In 1986, Tilders formed Dutch Tilders & The Blues Club with Martin Cooper on lead guitar; Winston Galea on drums and Barry Hills on bass guitar. In 1990, Cooper left the Blues Club and was replaced by Geoff Achison on lead guitar. In April 1990 they issued an album, The Blues Is My Life, which Foster noted displayed Tilders' "rough-edged voice and guitar, traditional blues from the darker side of life, but with a sometimes dour humour. Also that year Tilders helped establish the Melbourne Blues Appreciation Society (MBAS) and later became its patron. Dutch Tilders and The Blues Club followed with a live album, Live at the Station, in 1993, which was recorded at a gig at the Station Tavern and Brewery in Prahran in January.

In 1994 his backing band were The Holey Soles with Ian Clarke on drums; Anthony Harkin on harmonica; and Hills on bass guitar. The line up changed to Clarke; Peter Howell on bass guitar; and Luke Keoh on harmonica. By 1996 he had formed the Dutch Tilders Band with former band mates, Galea and Hills, joined by Greg Dodd on guitar. In 1998 he issued his next album, I'm a Bluesman, which was produced by Hills and included guest musicians: Steven Cepron on harmonica; Winston Galea on drums; Warren Hall on piano; David Lowry on guitar; Mick O’Connor on Hammond organ; and Suzanne Tilders on backing vocals.

Tilders later worked with the Legends Band. During the 2000s he issued three more albums, One More Time – Live at St Andrews (2001), Highlights of Bob Barnard's Jazz Party (2003) and Mine & Some I Adopted (2005). Tilders described his concept for the latter album, "[t]he idea was to show-case what I love to do best, playing solo, without the restrictions of an ensemble". He categorised his style of music "[s]ome of it is not strictly blues but it has the basis of that genre. I like to think that the listener gets a good feeling and doesn't take me too seriously. I'm a little irreverent at times but tongue in cheek".

In November 2009, Tilders performed at The Bridgetown Blues Festival, in Western Australia, front-lining "The Legends" tour with seminal Australian Blues performers: Matt Taylor (harmonica, guitar & vocals); Barry "Little Goose" Harvey (drums); Martin Cooper (lead guitar); Bob Patient (keyboards)

In October 2010, Tilders reunited with Martin Cooper and Winston Galea from the Blues Club to perform at the 21st annual Wangaratta Festival of Jazz. The following month he joined Barbara Blue, the "Queen of Memphis Blues", on her Australian tour. Tilders curated a compilation album, Going on a Journey. Anthology of 50 Great Years Playing the Blues, in 2010. On 23 April 2011 Matthew "Dutch" Tilders died, aged 69.

On 30 October 2019, Tilders was the first blues musician inducted into the Blues Music Victoria Inc Hall of Fame.

=== Personal life ===
Tilders married four times, and has two sons. His son Sonny Tilders is an animatronics artist, known for his work as a creative director for the Creature Technology Company. Sonny was born to Tilders' wife Loma, a school teacher. However, the couple separated when Sonny was a child and Dutch had little contact with Sonny during his upbringing. Tilders' other son Sam has a different mother. Tilders' solo album, Working Man (December 1976), was dedicated to Sonny and Sam Tilders.

In May 2010, Tilders' manager, Lynne Wright, announced that he had been diagnosed with oesophageal and liver cancer (although incorrectly reported in the media to be lung cancer). Tilders wrote and recorded "Going on a Journey" after learning of his diagnosis, it became the title track of his final album. In July that year a benefit concert was held with a line up of Tilders, Chain, Kevin Borich Express, Chris Finnen, Steve Russell, Geoff Achison, Lloyd Spiegel, Stevie Paige, and Jeannie Lushes Band. He retired from performing in January the following year due to the illness and ongoing treatment.

On 23 April 2011, Matthew "Dutch" Tilders died, aged 69. Tilders was dubbed the "Godfather of Blues" in Australia, he is survived by two sons and four siblings. Suzanne Petersen issued "Fine as Wine" in July 2011 as a tribute to Tilders. In May 2012 Australian Guitar magazine listed Tilders in the top 40 on their Definitive Australian Guitarists of All Time.

== Discography ==
=== Albums ===
- Dutch Tilders (August 1972) Fable Records / Bootleg Records (BLA-021)
- Australian Jazz of the 70s Vol. 5 The Blues Singers (split album with Margret RoadKnight) (1974) Jazznote (JNLP-009/S)
- Break (1975) Eureka Records / Electric Records Distribution (E-101)
- Working Man (December 1976) Eureka Records (E-104)
- Direct (May 1979) Eureka Records / RCA - AUS #68
- The Blues Had a Baby and They Called It Rock'n'Roll (by Dutch Tilders and Kevin Borich Express) (November 1980) - AUS #96
- The Blues Is My Life (April 1990)
- Eureka Files 1975–1980 (compilation album, 1992)
- Live at the Station (live album, 1993)
- I'm a Bluesman (1998)
- One More Time – Live at St Andrews (2001)
- Highlights of Bob Barnard's Jazz Party (2003)
- Dutch Direct/Blues Had a Baby (Remastered) (2004)
- Mine & Some I Adopted (2005)
- Going on a Journey (2010) Empire Records: MGM Distribution
- Live at the Commune 1973 (2020) Black Box Records

=== Singles ===
- "I'm a Mean Mistreater" (1975)
- "Goodnight, Irene" (1977)
- "Bad Books" (by Dutch Tilders and Kevin Borich Express) (1981)
