= The Party Boys (album) =

Studio album by The Party Boys
- Released: 13 November 1987
- Genre: Rock
- Label: CBS
- Producer: Alan Lancaster; John Brewster

The Party Boys chronology
You Need Professional Help (1985)	The Party Boys (1987)	Greatest Hits, Misses, B-Sides and Rarities (1992)

The Party Boys is the self-titled lone studio album by Australian rock supergroup the Party Boys. It was released in November 1987. Tracks 2, 4, 5 and 8 were originals, the rest of the songs are covers, originally recorded by (in order): Argent, John Kongos, Them, the Angels, La De Da's and AC/DC, however "It Could Have Been You" was originally released by the Party Boys' frontman John Swan as a solo single in 1985.

== Track listing ==
1. "Hold Your Head Up"
2. "Is This the Way to Say Goodbye"
3. "He's Gonna Step on You Again"
4. "She's a Mystery"
5. "Rising Star"
6. "Gloria"
7. "Small Talk"
8. "It Could've Been You"
9. "Gonna See My Baby"
10. "High Voltage"

== Personnel ==
- John Swan - lead vocals
- Kevin Borich - lead guitar, backing vocals; lead vocals on "Gonna See My Baby"
- John Brewster - rhythm guitar, backing vocals; guitar solo on "Rising Star"
- Alan Lancaster - bass, backing vocals; lead vocals on "Could've Been You"
- Paul Christie - drums, backing vocals
- Richard Harvey - drums
- Chris Turner - guitar solo on "She's a Mystery"

== Charts ==
Chart (1988)	Peak position
Australian Albums (Kent Music Report)	18
New Zealand Albums (RMNZ)	41

== Certifications ==
Region	Certification	Certified units/sales
Australia (ARIA)	Gold	35,000^{^}
^{^} Shipments figures based on certification alone.
