= Lichty Guitars =

American guitar manufacturer

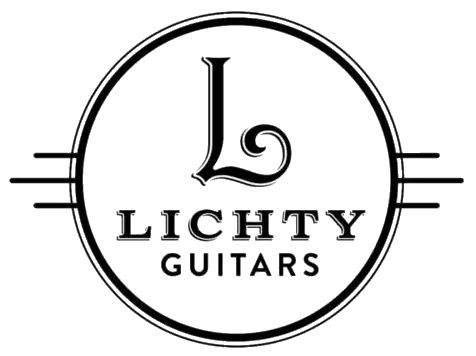
- Type: Private
- Industry: Musical instrument
- Founded: 2009; 17 years ago
- Founder: Jay Lichty
- Headquarters: Tryon, North Carolina, United States
- Products: Acoustic guitars
- Website: lichtyguitars.com

Lichty Guitars is an American company based in Tryon, North Carolina, that has been making custom acoustic guitars and ukuleles since 2009. It was founded by musician Jay Lichty.

== History ==
Lichty Guitars creates handmade instruments using domestic and exotic hardwoods. The company offered a series of handmade, hand-painted guitars and ukuleles following a collaboration with Raleigh, North Carolina artist Clark Hipolito.

The company's founder, Jay Lichty, offers individual and group guitar-building workshops and classes. He is a member of the Guild of American Luthiers (GAL) and the Association of Stringed Instrument Artisans (ASIA).

== Awards ==
Lichty Guitars was the overall winner in Garden & Gun magazine's "Made in the South" competition in 2010.

== Designs ==
=== Acoustic guitars ===
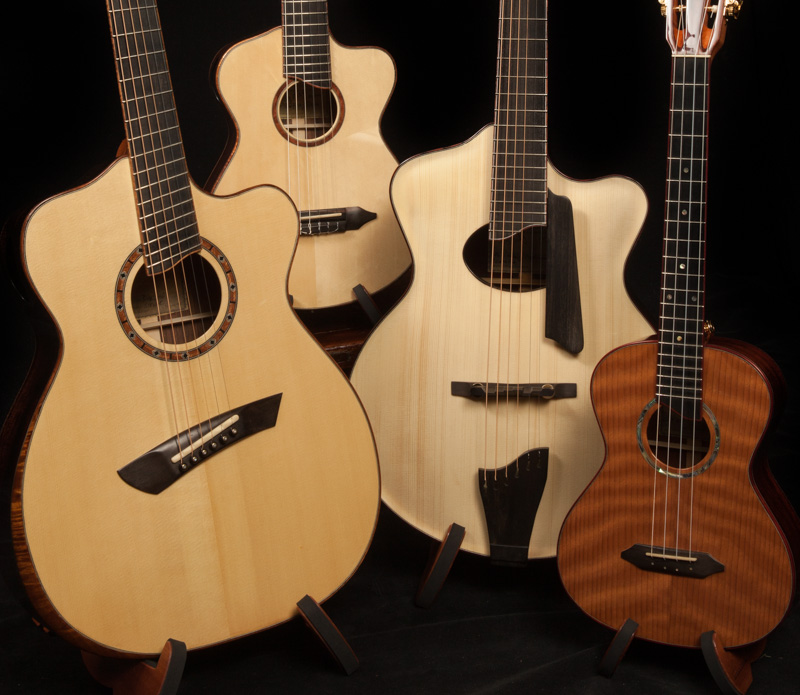
Lichty Custom Guitars and Ukuleles

- Dreadnought: A square-shouldered, deep-bodied guitar based on the steel-string guitar design. The quality of the dreadnought sound is full, balanced, and powerful, with deep bass registers.
- Orchestral Model (OM): The Lichty OM has a 14-fret neck, a smaller body than the dreadnought, and sloping shoulders. Its distinguishing features are responsive playability and balanced notes. Unlike the dreadnought, the bass register does not dominate.
- Alchemist: The Alchemist features distinctive body lines, a wedge-shaped body (inspired by the innovations of Linda Manzer), a side sound port, extended fretboard, bound fretboard and headstock, and Gotoh 510 tuners.
- Parlor Guitar: The smaller body size and design of the parlor guitar allows for a balance of frequencies.
- Crossover: A melding of a classical and a steel string guitar, the Crossover has the body and bracing of a Ramirez classical coupled with a radius fretboard and a 1-7/8″ nut width. Classical guitars typically have a 2" to 2-1/4" nut width and steel string guitars are 1-11/16" to 1-13/16". Lichty's model adds a truss rod, optional body cutaway and side sound port, a K&K Classic pickup, and nylon strings.

=== Ukuleles ===
- Tenor Ukulele: The tenor is larger than the concert and soprano size, and therefore produces greater volume and a more complex tone than smaller ukuleles. Its larger size also makes it an easier adaption for guitar players.
- Baritone Ukulele: The baritone is the largest of the ukulele sizes and produces the deepest sound. Its size and tuning are often the same as the bottom four strings of the guitar.
