= The Happy Prince (The La De Das album) =

Studio album by The La De Da's
- Released: June 1969
- Recorded: January 1969
- Studios: EMI Studios, Sydney, Australia
- Genres: Psychedelic rock; psychedelic pop; soft rock; rock opera; proto-prog
- Labels: Columbia Records; EMI
- Producer: David Woodley-Page

The La De Da's chronology
Find Us A Way (1967)	The Happy Prince (1969)	Rock And Roll Sandwich (1973)

Singles from The Happy Prince
- 1. "Come And Fly With Me" / "Swallow, Little Swallow" Released: 1969

The Happy Prince is a studio album by the New Zealand rock band the La De Da's, released in June 1969. It was the third album from the group and is often cited as the first Australian and New Zealand concept album.

== Background ==
In early 1967, while preparing for their second album, bassist Trevor Wilson anticipated an era when rock music would be taken seriously as an art form. He came up with a project that he felt would put the group far in front of their contemporaries, and put them on the map internationally. His idea was to create what would later be called "rock opera". For the basis of the piece he chose to adapt Oscar Wilde's classic tale "The Happy Prince". Unfortunately, keyboardist Bruce Howard was his only ally in the band, but together they started to piece the work together, although it would take several years to come to fruition. It was also the seed of later divisions within the band.

Later in mid-1967, the La De Da's would see the Australian rock group the Twilights at Berties nightclub in Melbourne. Fresh from their recent trip to England, decked out in the latest Carnaby Street gear, The Twilights were currently wowing local audiences with their famous note-perfect live renditions of the entire Sgt Pepper's Lonely Hearts Club Band album. Seeing them gave Howard and Wilson's plan to realise the Happy Prince project added impetus, although they knew it was something they probably wouldn't be able to achieve in Australia.

Over 1967 and 1968 the Las De Das would build a reputation for their live shows. Their look and sound become more psychedelic, augmenting their stage setup with exotic and varied instrumentation like organ, electric piano, saxophone, sitar, flute, mandolin, cello and even bagpipes. They were crowned "Sydney's Gods of Psychedelia" and where filling out venues around the city.

After over 12 months in Australia, the La De Da's were a hit on the live circuit, but they still hadn't released any records, steadfastly refusing to record anything other than their cherished Happy Prince project. The chance finally came their way in late 1968. Jimmy Stewart, expatriate English producer behind Melbourne band Pastoral Symphony's one-off hit "Love Machine", had recently set up a new independent label, Sweet Peach.

Stewart approached the La De Da's with an offer to record and release The Happy Prince. The delighted band began intensive rehearsals in preparation for recording at Armstrong Studios in Melbourne. But as the year wore on, Sweet Peach repeatedly arranged sessions and then postponed them, and by November the deal had collapsed. This was a major disappointment for the band, who had worked for several months to arrange and rehearse the piece, and the failure of the deal was a massive letdown for Trevor Wilson.

== Recording ==
It was at this point that the saviour of The Happy Prince appeared. Melbourne writer Adrian Rawlins had attended many of the rehearsals and was profoundly impressed with the piece. On his way north to Townsville in December, he stopped off in Sydney to catch a La De Da's gig at the Here disco in North Sydney; he exhorted the band not to give up on the project and his enthusiasm convinced Trevor Wilson to give it one more try.

Overseen by then up-and-coming young producer David Woodley-Page, The Happy Prince was recorded over four weeks in early 1969. The album was recorded using two 4-track tape machines. Australia lagged behind the UK and USA in access to new recording equipment, and although 8-track was already in common use overseas, Australia's first 8-track recorder (at Armstrong Studios) was not installed until 1970. So many of the album's songs featured overdubbing via bouncing down the tracks from the first 4-track into a single or two channels of another 4-track to create additional tracks.

== Album concept ==
The album is based on the Oscar Wilde story of the same name. The album features a narration of The Happy Prince story by Australian poet Adrian Rawlins interspersed between songs by the La De Da's that also relate to the story's plot.

== Releases and reception ==
The album was released in June 1969 on EMI/Columbia in Australia and on Columbia in New Zealand later that year. It was also slated for an October 1969 release on Capitol Records in the United States. Although the album received positive reviews from some Australian critics, it was a commercial failure on release. A digitally remastered version was released on CD in New Zealand in 2005.

== Track listing ==
All songs written by Bruce Howard and Trevor Wilson, based on the story by Oscar Wilde.

=== Side A ===
1. Intro
2. Covered In Gold
3. Ruby For The Lady
4. Come And Fly With Me
5. Swallow, Little Swallow
6. You Can't Take It With You

=== Side B ===
1. Life Is Leaving
2. Tales Of The Nile
3. Winter Song
4. Lullaby
5. Civic Pride
6. 'Chant'
