= The La De Da's =

New Zealand rock band

- L to R: Phil Key, Kevin Borich, Peter Roberts "Gonna See My Baby" on GTK, 1971

Background information
- Also known as: The Mergers; The La-De-Da Band; La De Das
- Origin: Te Atatū, Auckland, New Zealand
- Genres: Garage rock; rhythm and blues; psychedelic rock; blues rock
- Years active: 1963–1975
- Labels: Zodiac; Philips; Columbia; EMI
- Spinoffs: Kevin Borich Express
- Past members: Kevin Borich; Phil Key; Brett Neilsen; Trevor Wilson; Bruce Howard; Bryan Harris; Keith Barber; Reno Tehei; Peter Roberts; Ronnie Peel (p.k.a. Rockwell T. James)

The La De Da's were a New Zealand rock band active from 1963 to 1975. Originally formed as a mod-inspired group called the Mergers in Te Atatū, the band’s long-term members were Kevin Borich (lead guitar and vocals), Phil Key (lead vocals and guitar), and Trevor Wilson (bass guitar). In mid-1968, they relocated to Australia.

Their popular singles in New Zealand included "How Is the Air Up There?" and "On Top of the World" (both 1966), as well as "Hey! Baby", "All Purpose Low", and "Rosalie" (all 1967). In Australia, they achieved chart success on the Go-Set National Top 40 with "Gonna See My Baby Tonight" (1971), "Morning, Good Morning" (1972), and "Too Pooped to Pop" (1974). The group released one of the first Australasian concept albums, The Happy Prince (1969).

The La De Da's toured throughout New Zealand, Australia, England, and continental Europe, and supported several international artists during their Australian performances. Their musical style evolved over time—from instrumentals and garage rock-infused R&B to psychedelic rock, and later to blues rock and a more stripped-down hard rock sound in their final years. In Australia, the band is remembered for launching the solo career of Borich, who went on to form the Kevin Borich Express in 1976. Phil Key died in 1984 from a congenital heart defect, and Ronnie Peel, their later-era bass guitarist, died of cancer in 2020.

== History ==
=== 1963–1967: Formation to Find Us a Way ===
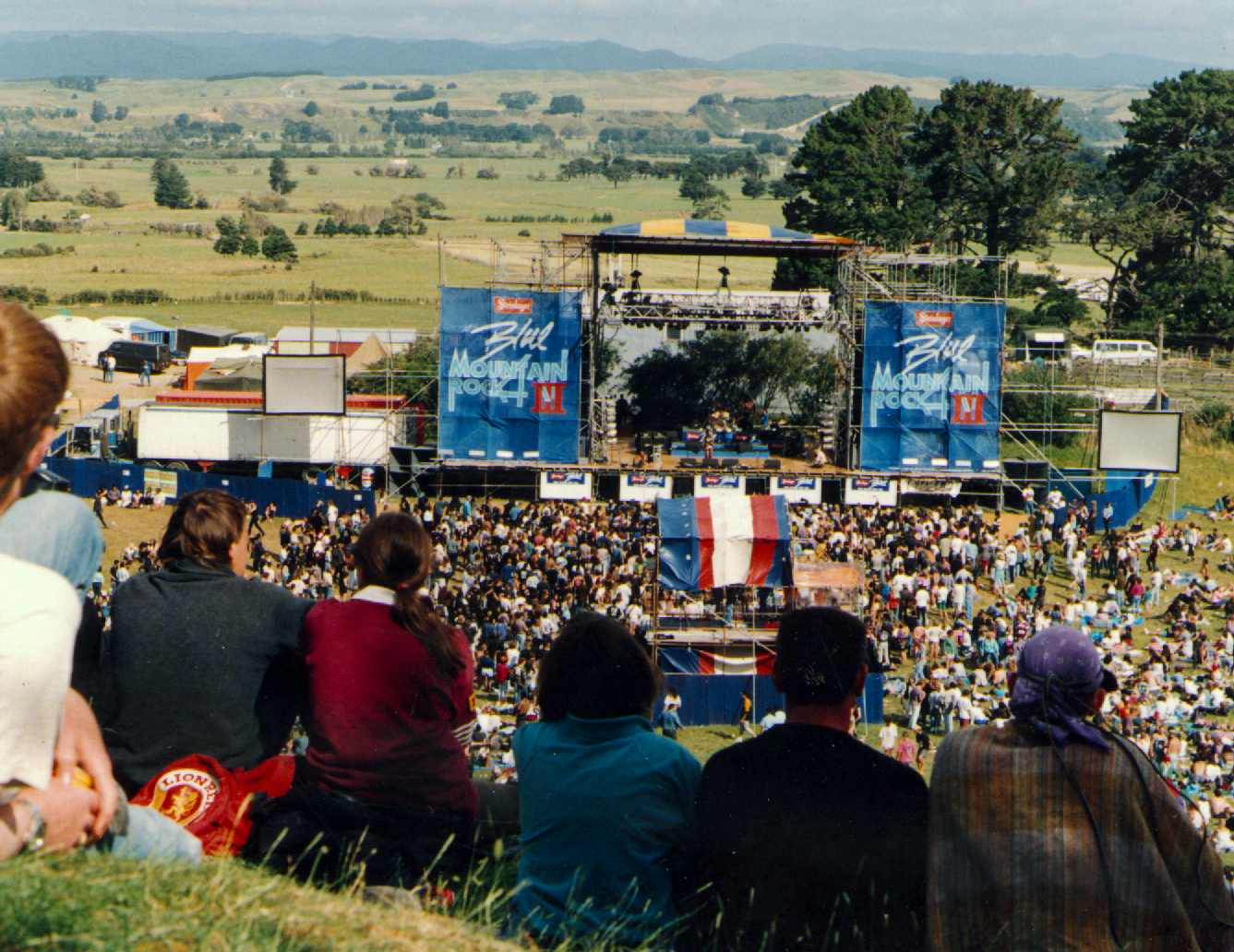
Kevin Borich performing at Mountain Rock

The La De Da's were formed as the Mergers in Te Atatū Peninsula in late 1963 by three Rutherford High School students Kevin Borich on lead guitar, Brett Neilsen on drums and Trevor Wilson on bass guitar; they were joined by Phil Key on rhythm guitar from Mt Albert Grammar School. Their average age was 16 years. The Mergers played mod-ish instrumentals, with the Shadows as their major influence, at local dances and school socials. The Beatles' visit in June 1964 and the emergence of the Rolling Stones, brought a change of style to the group with Key becoming their lead singer and Borich and Wilson adding backing vocals.

The members decided that the Mergers failed to reflect the toughness of their new garage rock music and searched for another name. One promoter changed it to the Gonks for an early 1965 gig at a summer carnival. They initially decided on the Criminals, however, one of the members' mother suggested "something nice, like the la-de-das ...", which was approved. By early 1965 the group were getting regular bookings on Auckland's dance circuit. A local TV producer, Robert Handlin, had the group promote a film broadcast, Those Magnificent Men in Their Flying Machines (1965), in exchange for studio recording time. Their debut single, "Little Girl", was released on the Talent City label in April 1965. The track was co-written by Borich and Wilson. Australian musicologist Ian McFarlane described it as a "low-key slice of Rolling Stones-derived R&B".

In November 1965 they gained a residency at an Auckland nightclub, The Platterack. After Key finished secondary education in December, the band became fully professional and received NZ£12 per week. Classically trained organist Bruce Howard joined them on keyboards and occasional lead vocals. Thereafter, Howard and Wilson co-wrote most of their original material. Zodiac's owner Eldred Stebbing caught their performance at The Platterack and asked the La De Da's to issue a cover version of American duo the Changin' Times's album track, "How Is the Air Up There?" (February 1966), as their second single. It reached No. 4 on New Zealand Listener's Hit Parade. The single also charted at Sydney radio stations. The group signed with Stebbing both as their talent manager and record producer for Zodiac, which was distributed via Phillips.

Their fourth single, "On Top of the World" (November 1966), was a cover of John Mayall's song, which peaked at No. 2 on the Hit Parade. They became resident band at Stebbing's Galaxie nightclub and regularly appeared on TV pop music show C'mon. Although their music was "tough garage-punk", the La De Da's donned mod clothing with plaid trousers, satin shirts and buckle shoes. Key recalled:

We tried to be honest and sincere with our music, only playing and recording what we liked. The guys in the good record bars dug what we were doing and they got in all the latest English R&B records for us. We were listening to Zoot Money, John Mayall, Manfred Mann, the Animals, all that sort of stuff and trying to create that sound... we tried to be a lot more imaginative about what we did ... We had no idea what we were earning on tour, we just spent what we wanted and ploughed the rest back into the band. We had our way with girls, bought more clothes and equipment and just enjoyed being stars.

In November 1966 their song "How Is the Air Up There?" was a finalist for the Loxene Golden Disc Awards. They issued their debut self-titled album of cover versions in December 1966, which sold out of its first pressing. Multi-instrumentalist Claude Papesch recommended Bruce Channel's "Hey! Baby" to the group, which they released in February 1967. It resulted in their first number-one on the Hit Parade and the first New Zealand-made record to reach the top. In April they released their extended play Stupidity, with covers of Solomon Burke's "Stupidity", "Coming Home", the Young Rascals' "I Ain't Gonna Eat Out My Heart Anymore" and Otis Redding's "Respect".

While preparing for their second album, Wilson began working on his rock opera project, The Happy Prince. He adapted Oscar Wilde's story "The Happy Prince". Howard supported his project, although it became a divisive issue for other band members. The La De Da's second album, Find Us a Way (May 1967), had their sound shifting from R&B roots by adding influences from the Spencer Davis Group. It included original material and covers. McFarlane, in 1999, described their first two albums and their EP as "highly regarded by 1960s aficionados". Although they were unhappy about Find Us a Way's track selection and cover art, it sold well in New Zealand.

=== 1967–1969: Australian relocation and The Happy Prince ===
The La De Da's travelled to Sydney in May 1967, where they worked at Ward Austin's Jungle disco and also supported the Easybeats, which had returned from the United Kingdom. The band's Australian talent manager, Jimmy Murta, had their near-shoulder-length hair trimmed back and pitched them at the teenage market, which dissatisfied the band's members. Another single, "All Purpose Low", was released in June and went to No. 3 on the NZ Hit Parade. It was followed in August by "Rosalie", which reached No. 5. Before their second visit to Australia, in early 1968, Neilson was replaced on drums by Bryan Harris (ex-the Action). McFarlane observed, "they had changed direction. [They] were one of the first local bands to include covers of Vanilla Fudge, Doors and Traffic... [and were] at the forefront of the Australian flower power movement."

In June 1968 Harris was replaced, in turn, by Keith Barber (ex-the Wild Cherries). English-born producer, Jimmy Stewart approached the La De Da's to record their third album, The Happy Prince, but by November the deal had collapsed. Early in 1969 Adrian Rawlins convinced the group to continue recording in Sydney with himself as narrator and David Woodley-Page as producer for EMI Music (NZ). Woodley-Page recorded their material onto two Scully 4-track recorders, which were electronically synchronised and provided better multi-tracking and overdubbing. The Happy Prince was issued in April 1969, as one of the first Australasian concept albums. It was "praised for its quality musicianship and production values. Despite the fine playing, it was an overly serious and flawed album, and duly sank without a trace." Music journalist Ed Nimmervoll felt "the ambition of the project outweighed its entertainment value."

They toured England from April 1969, but "[their] brand of soft psychedelic pop was outdated". Their use of cover versions put them "out of step with what was going on" locally. Nevertheless they recorded their rendition of the Beatles' "Come Together", which was issued, by the La-De-Da Band, in September 1969. They performed shows at London's Stax Club, the Corn Exchange and at clubs in Birmingham, but the UK gigs dried up. They undertook a short German tour and then France for a month of poorly paid gigs. Leaving Wilson in the UK, the rest of the group returned to Australia in April 1970.

Back in Australia they changed musical direction again, adopting "straightforward, gutsy rock'n'roll". Reno Tahei (ex-Compulsion, Luke's Walnut, Genesis) joined on bass guitar until Wilson returned. Tahei was arrested and deported to New Zealand. The exit of Howard, Tahei and Wilson resulted in a four-piece with Barber, Borich and Key joined by Peter Roberts (ex-Freshwater) on bass guitar. At Byron Bay on New Year's Eve 1970, the La De Da's unveiled their stripped-down hard rock style, which took them back to their R&B roots and drew heavily from 12-bar Chicago blues and the legacy of Jimi Hendrix. The new line-up got a rousing reception at the Wallacia Festival in January. They regularly shared bills with Tamam Shud, Company Caine, Chain and Billy Thorpe and the Aztecs.

In the latter half of the year, they often appeared alongside Daddy Cool. In September they teamed with Chain, Tamam Shud and Country Radio for two outdoor concerts at Wollongong and Sydney Showgrounds, before a combined crowd of about 10,000 people, and on Boxing Day 1971 they co-headlined with Daddy Cool before an estimated 50,000 people at the 3XY Rosebud Show in Victoria. The La De Da's issued their next single, "Gonna See My Baby Tonight", in November 1971, which drew a rave review from Molly Meldrum in teen pop music newspaper, Go-Set ("...a fantastic song, intelligently recorded, it has to be number one"). It reached No. 12 on the Go-Set National Top 40. "Gonna See My Baby Tonight" was written by Borich.

=== 1971–1972: Line-up changes ===
In November 1971 the La De Da's planned a four-week New Zealand tour but despite shows selling out the group dropped out at Key's insistence. Sydney-based Michael Chugg of Consolidated Rock was hired as their talent agent and when he later set up his own agency, Sunrise, he continued to handle the La De Da's. In January 1972 they performed at the inaugural Sunbury Pop Festival and were described as one of the highlights of the weekend. Three of their tracks, "Roundabout", "Gonna See My Baby Tonight" and "Morning Good Morning", were recorded for EMI/His Master's Voice's live double album by Various Artists, Sunbury (October 1972).

Their next single, "Morning Good Morning", was released in March and peaked at No. 24 on the Go-Set charts. It was co-written by Borich and Key; on the 1972 Go-Set pop poll the pair were listed in the top 10 of the Best Songwriter category. The band continued to attract large audiences through 1972, touring nationally supporting Manfred Mann Chapter Three. They appeared with Gerry Humphrys, Friends and Billy Thorpe and the Aztecs at 3XY's free concert at the Myer Music Bowl, which drew an estimated 200,000 people – one of the largest concert audiences in Australia to that time. McFarlane considered they were one of the top three bands in the country, beside Billy Thorpe and the Aztecs and Daddy Cool, during that year.

In spite of the successes, internal tension in the band had grown. Chugg resigned as their manager and they took on Roger Davies (Chugg's workmate at Sunrise). Key and Roberts, who "wanted to pursue a gentle pop course", left in September 1972 to form Band of Light. Borich, now the last original member, with Barber brought in Ronnie Peel (p.k.a. Rockwell T. James) on bass guitar to continue the band as a trio, which "became a rock powerhouse". Their debut performance of the new line-up was at Sydney's Paddington Town Hall in November.

=== 1973–1975: Rock and Roll Sandwich to Legend ===
In January 1973, the La De Da's headlined the Great Ngaruawahia Music Festival, New Zealand. According to NZ musicologist John Dix, they delivered "...a well-paced set [that] blew Black Sabbath and everything New Zealand had to offer clear off the stage." Returning to Australia they completed a major-city concert tour in May. For the rest of the year, it was a constant round of touring, either as head-liners, sharing the bill with Sherbet or as support to visiting international acts, Little Richard, Gary Glitter, Three Dog Night, the Guess Who and Lindisfarne. They also provided backing on two tracks of Richard Clapton's debut album, Prussian Blue (November 1973), including Borich's guitar solo on Clapton's single, "I Wanna Be a Survivor" (July 1974).

In July the band's truck collided on the Hume Highway, Peel and their roadie John Brewster (not the Angels's John Brewster) were both hospitalised with injuries. However, most of their equipment was destroyed. The Sunrise agency organised a benefit concert at Sydney's Green Elephant Hotel (the Doncaster Theatre) with the La De Da's, Sherbet, Buffalo, Pirana, Lotus, Home, Country Radio, I'Tambu, Original Battersea Heroes and Hush, which raised about AU$2000 for the group. The band were being hailed as Australia's leading live act and Borich was widely regarded as Australia's pre-eminent guitar hero. Nimmervoll recalled, "Borich had always impressed with his guitar work. Now he had the chance to shine, a latter day [Hendrix] with pop star features inside a fiery rock trio."

With Chugg back as manager, Borich was impatient to record a new album. The first sessions at EMI's studios with Rod Coe producing were unsatisfactory and only two tracks, "She Tell Me What To Do" and "No Law Against Having Fun", were kept. Additional sessions at the Green Elephant Hotel and were more fruitful. Their fourth studio album, Rock and Roll Sandwich (November 1973), "remains a classic boogie rock album" according to McFarlane. It was also lauded by Glenn A. Baker as "one of Australia's finest rock albums, a fiery, cohesive work dominated by the superbly talented [Borich] and carried off by the reliable gutsiness of Peel and Barber." Touring in support of the release, the La De Da's enjoyed their most successful period, including supports for Elton John and Suzi Quatro on their Australian tours.

Solid gigging continued through 1974 and into 1975, including an appearance at the final Sunbury Festival in January 1975. During 1975 problems for the band increased — Australian commercial radio was ignoring their records and internal tensions were building. The situation was summarised by Baker in 1981:

Overseas bands can make an album, do a tour and then hide away for a year or two to prepare the next LP with no concern for loss of position. In Australia, just three months off the road to prepare new material and a band's gig price drops to half, the media erects new superstars in their place, and the public acts as if they never were ... That is what killed the La De Da's: the bludgeoning effect of realising that, after 10 hard years, nothing tangible had really been achieved and the only thing that lay ahead was more of the same.

In March 1975 EMI issued Legend, a valedictory compilation album of single A-sides, recent recordings and leftovers curated by Chugg. It also included Borich's studio rendition of "All Along the Watchtower", which was Hendrix-inspired. On 20 April, they performed at a benefit concert for Bangladesh at the Sidney Myer Music Bowl with Ayers Rock, Jim Keays, AC/DC, Phil Manning, Daddy Cool, Toulouse & Too Tight, the Dingoes, and the Moir Sisters. In May 1975, Borich announced that the La De Da's were disbanding.

Nimmervoll felt, "[what] attracted band members and audiences to the [group] from the beginning was the musicianship coming off the stage... [they were] hurtling from one dramatic change to another, in between were the kind of performances most musicians and groups dream of delivering. The changes came both from circumstances, and the fact that the group had never really been allowed to be single-minded about what they wanted to do". AllMusic's Richie Unterberger acknowledged "[they] were New Zealand's most popular rock group of the '60s" aside from Ray Columbus & the Invaders". He described their later work as "pedestrian hard rock that — like even the best of their early work — was very derivative of overseas trends." Andrew Schmidt of AudioCulture described the band's relocation to Australia, "They may have left New Zealand, but they never left the New Zealand music community" – they worked with ex-pat New Zealander musicians and producers.

=== 1975–present: Post-break-up ===
Kevin Borich toured under the La De Da's name with Harry Brus on bass guitar and Barry Harvey on drums, which were renamed as the Kevin Borich Express in 1976. He continued that band into the 1990s with a succession of bass guitarists and drummers. After the split of Band of Light in 1975, Phil Key left the music business and died in 1984 from a congenital heart condition. Ronnie Peel undertook a solo career in the late 1970s as Rockwell T James and later joined John Paul Young's backing band. Trevor Wilson continued performing in Australia before moving to London. Howard also lived in London.

Neilsen returned to Auckland where he was a member of the Action from 1967 to 1969 and later joined Cruise Lane and thence to the Medicine Show. The remaining original La De Da's' members reunited in New Zealand in 1992 for a Galaxie Club reunion show and played a set dedicated to the memory of Phil Key. Keith Barber quit the music industry and became a printer; he died in 2005 after being diagnosed with cancer. Ronnie Peel died of an unspecified cancer in 2020. Bruce Howard died in 2021.

== Personnel ==
- Kevin Borich – lead guitar, vocals (1964–1975)
- Phil Key – lead vocals, rhythm guitar (1964–1972, died 1984)
- Brett Neilsen – drums, vocals (1964–1968)
- Trevor Wilson – bass guitar (1964–1970)
- Bruce Howard – organ, keyboards (1965–1972, died 2021)
- Bryan Harris – drums (1968)
- Keith Barber – drums (1968–1975, died 2005)
- Reno Tehei – bass guitar (1970)
- Peter Roberts – bass guitar (1971–1973)
- Ronnie Peel (p.k.a. Rockwell T. James) – bass guitar, vocals (1973–1975, died 2020)

== Discography ==
=== Studio albums ===
- The La De Da's (1966) – Zodiac Records / Philips
- Find Us a Way (1967) – Zodiac Records / Philips (PL08792)
- The Happy Prince (1969) – EMI (SCXO 7899)
- Rock and Roll Sandwich (1973) – EMI (EMC 2504)

=== Live albums ===
- Sunbury 1972 (by Various Artists) (1972) – EMI/His Master's Voice

=== Compilation albums ===
- Legend (1975) – EMI (EMA 309) (re-released on CD as The Best of the La De Das Legend)
- Rock 'n' Roll Decade 1964-74 (1981) – EMI (EMY 508/9)
- La De Da's (1995) – Zero Records (re-released in 2003 on EMI)
- How Is the Air Up There?: 1966-1967 (2000) – Ascension (ANCD018)
- La De Da's (2014) – Real Groovy Records

=== Extended plays ===
- Stupidity (1967) – Philips

=== Singles ===
List of singles with selected chart positions
| Title | Year | Peak chart positions | | Ref. |
| Title | Year | NZ | AUS | Ref. |
|---|---|---|---|---|
| "Little Girl" | 1965 | 32 | — | |
| "How Is the Air Up There?" | 1966 | 4 | — | |
| "Don't You Stand in My Way" | 1966 | — | — | —N/a |
| "On Top of the World" | 1966 | 2 | — | |
| "Hey Baby" | 1967 | 1 | — | |
| "All Purpose Low" | 1967 | 3 | — | |
| "Rosalie" | 1967 | 5 | — | |
| "Come Together" | 1969 | — | — | —N/a |
| "Come and Fly with Me" | 1969 | — | — | —N/a |
| "Sweet Girl" | 1971 | — | — | —N/a |
| "Gonna See My Baby Tonight" | 1971 | — | 12 | |
| "Morning, Good Morning" | 1972 | — | 24 | |
| "I'll Never Stop Loving You" | 1972 | — | — | —N/a |
| "The Place" | 1974 | 48 | — | |
| "Too Pooped to Pop" | 1974 | — | 26 | |
| "Honky Tonkin'" | 1974 | — | — | —N/a |

== Awards ==
- 1977 - Australian Rock Music Awards - Best Guitarist
- 1978 - Australian Rock Music Awards - Best Guitarist
- 1978 - Concert of The Year Award (Marconi Club)
- 1983 - Ampex Golden Reel Award
- 1983 - The Party Boys - LP EMI Gold Record
- 1983 - Live at Several 21st (Party Boys) EMI Gold Record
- 1987 - He's Gonna Step on You (Party Boys) EMI Gold Record
- 1999 - Australian Blues Music Festival - Heritage Award
- 2003 – Australian Blues Foundation – Hall of Fame
