= Kevin Borich =

- Also known as: KB
- Born: Kevin Nicholas Borich; 27 October 1948 (age 77); Huapai, New Zealand
- Genres: Blues, rock
- Occupations: Singer-songwriter, musician
- Instrument: Guitar
- Years active: 1969–present
- Labels: Astor, Zodiac, Festival, EMI
- Member of: Kevin Borich Express
- Formerly of: The La De Da's; John Paul Young & the Allstars; The Party Boys
- Website: Official Rock House of Kevin Borich

Kevin Nicholas Borich (born 27 October 1948) is a New Zealand-born Australian guitarist, singer, and songwriter. He was a key member of the La De Da's, the founder and frontman of the Kevin Borich Express, and a founding member of the Party Boys. Borich has also worked extensively as a session musician for numerous Australian artists.

Borich wrote "Gonna See My Baby Tonight" for the La De Da's, which became a top 10 hit in 1971 on the Australian singles chart. He performed at some of Australia's biggest rock events including the 1972 Sunbury Pop Festival and the late 1970s Rockarena tours with 60,000 people, featuring Fleetwood Mac, Santana and The Little River Band. He played in two New Year's Eve celebrations at the Sydney Opera House with 70,000 people as well as support shows for international acts including Elton John, Status Quo, Jeff Beck and Buddy Guy.

Australian rock music historian Ian McFarlane has described Borich as "one of the most celebrated guitar players in the history of Australian rock. He also remains an underrated songwriter, and his live reputation has rarely been reflected in record sales".

His son Lucius Borich joined Kevin Borich Express as a drummer and was later a member of Sydney-based progressive rock band Cog.

== Early life ==
Borich was born in Huapai north west of Auckland on New Zealand's North Island. He attended secondary school at Rutherford High School in Te Atatū Peninsula, a suburb of Auckland. In 1961, at the age of 12, Borich recorded a private single on Astor Records with sisters Judy and Sue Donaldson (later as New Zealand duo The Chicks). As a guitarist, Borich formed The Mergers in late 1963 with fellow students Brett Neilsen on drums and Trevor Wilson on bass guitar. Initially they performed covers of The Shadows' material as an instrumental band after school and on week-ends.

== Career ==
=== 1964–1975: The La De Da's ===
With the addition of vocalist/rhythm guitarist Phil Key, The Mergers with Borich on lead guitar/vocals, Neilsen on drums/vocals and Wilson on bass guitar, were eventually renamed as the La De Da's in 1964 in Auckland, New Zealand. In June 1965 they recorded their debut single, "Little Girl", and later that year added Bruce Howard on keyboards. From 1966 to 1967 they had five New Zealand top 10 hits, "How is the Air Up There?", "On Top of the World", "Hey Baby", "All Purpose Low" and "Rosalie". By 1968 they were based in Sydney and recorded their concept album, The Happy Prince, in 1969 on EMI.

Line-up changes occurred, with Borich and Key joined by Peter Roberts on bass guitar and Keith Barber on drums by 1971's Australian Kent Music Report top 10 hit single, "Gonna See My Baby Tonight". It had been written by Borich, who had established a reputation as "Australia's guitar hero supremo" and regularly performed "All Along the Watchtower" using Jimi Hendrix' interpretation of the Bob Dylan song to close the La De Da's' live set.

In late January 1972, they appeared at the inaugural Sunbury Pop Festival and featured on the subsequent double album, Sunbury, released in October by EMI/His Master's Voice.

The La De Da's recorded further albums and singles and, despite critical acclaim, had little chart success. Only Borich remained throughout until he disbanded the group in 1975. After the La De Da's, Borich toured with John Paul Young & the Allstars for some months before forming a new band.

=== 1976–1989: Kevin Borich Express to The Party Boys ===
Kevin Borich Express was formed in early 1976 by Borich on lead guitar, lead vocals and occasional flute with Harry Brus on bass guitar (ex-Blackfeather) and Barry Harvey on drums (Wild Cherries, Chain). They recorded a track, "The End of Me", before Brus and Harvey were soon replaced by Reuben San Fiansco on bass guitar and Gil Matthews on drums. Subsequent line-ups were typically a three piece with a succession of bass guitarists and drummers. They released their debut single, "Goin' Somewhere", in October using Fiansco, and John Annas on drums (Wendy Saddington Band). Following in March 1977 was their debut album, Celebration! with Annas, and Tim Partridge on bass guitar (Mighty Kong, The Johnny Rocco Band). The album was favoured by critics and peaked in the top 30 on the Australian albums charts.

In early 1977, Borich supported the tour by UK rock guitarist Jeff Beck. Mid-1977 saw the release of the band's follow-up album Lonely One. This was followed in October by supporting the Rockarena tour with Fleetwood Mac, Santana and Little River Band; Borich was invited on-stage to jam with Carlos Santana. In May 1978, the band toured the US in support of Australian heavy rockers AC/DC, with Annas, Paul Christie on bass guitar and keyboard player Tim Shafer (Gary Wright Band). This line-up recorded No Turning Back which was released in March 1979.

By mid-year, Partridge had returned with both Christie and Shafer departing, and together with Annas, Borich recorded Live!, using the 2JJ mobile studio equipment over performances in Melbourne and Wollongong. Live! contains one of the most incendiary and atmospheric versions of "Little Red Rooster" ever recorded, along with a number of Borich standards.

In July, Kevin Borich Express appeared on Renée Geyer's album Blues License. A European tour by Kevin Borich Express resulted in a compilation album being released in Germany. After the tour, John Watson (Heavy Division) replaced Annas on drums and the band recorded Angel's Hand in November 1979. Similar line-up changes continued into the early 1980s with Michael Deep replacing Partridge in April 1980. This line-up collaborated with solo artist Dutch Tilders to record Blues Had a Baby and They Called It Rock'n'Roll in 1981 on RCA Records. Kerry Jacobsen (Dragon) replaced Watson on drums for the Shy Boys Shy Girls mini-LP in late 1981. By mid-1982, Annas returned on drums, with Steve Balbi on bass guitar, and Andy Cowan on keyboards.

Later that year, Borich on guitar joined The Party Boys which was formed by previous band member Paul Christie (now ex-Mondo Rock) on bass guitar, drums and backing vocals, Harvey James (Sherbet) on guitar and Graham Bidstrup (The Angels) on drums. Initially a side-project, The Party Boys, had top 10 success with singles "He's Gonna Step on You Again" (No. 1, 1987) and "Hold Your Head Up" (No. 7, 1987), and albums Live at Several 21sts (No. 9, 1983) and The Party Boys (No. 1, 1987). Consequently, Kevin Borich Express output and touring was reduced during the 1980s. In 1989, Borich left The Party Boys and appeared in Jimmy Barnes band for the 1990 Two Fires tour.

Borich won 'Best Guitarist' at the 1977 and 1978 Australian Rock Music Awards.

=== 1990–present ===
Borich continues to perform at Australian and international events, in 2011 featuring long time friend Harry Brus on bass and his son Lucius Borich on drums. This lineup released a double CD and DVD under the banner Borich X Borich Live at the Basement. Borich still utilises a spectrum of Australia's best musicians at different times, including John Annas returning on drums with Ian Lees on bass guitar (ex-Moving Pictures), and with two former members John Watson and Harry Brus. He released the CD/DVD package of Live at the Big Kahuna in 1995. A studio album was released in 1998, Heart Starter, with Lucius Borich of Cog on drums and Ben Rosen on bass guitar touring to promote it.

At the Gimme Ted benefit concert on 10 March 2001 Borich performed three songs. Over the 15 years since, he has continued to perform the Australian tour circuit and festivals with various line-ups, and released albums Nomad and Borich X Borich, recorded live at Circular Quay's The Basement. His latest studio album is Totem.

Borich won the Heritage Award at the 1999 Australian Blues Music Festival and was inducted into the Australian Blues Foundation Hall of Fame in 2003.

In July 2023, Borich released the album Duets. It was preceded by the single "Keep It to Myself" with Tim Rogers.

== Personal life ==
Borich has been married twice and has six children, the youngest three with his second wife Melissa Borich.

He was diagnosed with Nasopharyngeal squamous cell carcinoma in May 2005 and undertook radiation and chemotherapies. The treatments resulted in the loss of his salivary glands and some hearing.

== Cultural influences ==
Australian band TISM, on their 1990 album Hot Dogma, have tracks called "Kevin Borich Expressionism" Parts 1, 2 and 4. On the Collected Recordings 1986-1993 box set there is a track called "Kevin Borich Expressionism".

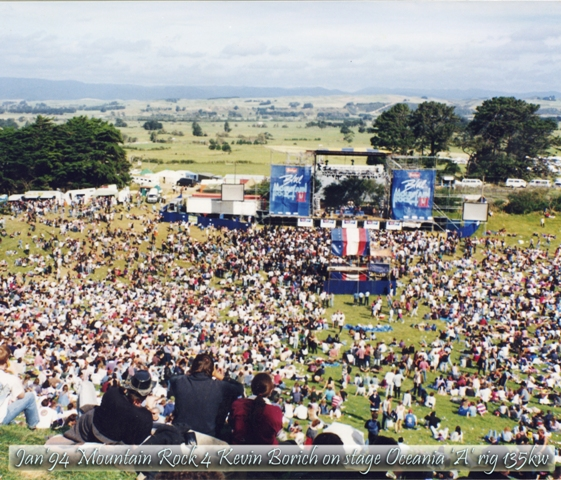
Kevin Borich Express playing at Mountain Rock 3

== Discography ==
=== Albums ===
List of albums, with selected details and chart positions
Title	Album details	Peak chart positions
Title	Album details	AUS
Celebration (as Kevin Borich Express)	Released: March 1977; Label: Image (ILP757)	28
Lonely One	Released: November 1977; Label: Image (ILP 778)	51
No Turning Back (as Kevin Borich Express)	Released: March 1979; Label: Mercury (6357 059)	48
Live (as Kevin Borich Express)	Released: 1979; Label: Image/Mushroom (L 37139); Note: Live album	—
The Blues Had a Baby (as Borich 'n' Tilders)	Released: November 1980; Label: Eureka (E 113)	96
Angel's Hand (as Kevin Borich Express)	Released: December 1980; Label: Image/Mushroom (L 37181)	92
Shy Boys Shy Girls (as Kevin Borich Express)	Released: 1982; Label: Image/Mushroom (L-20008)	—
The Best of The Kevin Borich Express	Released: 1988; Note: Greatest hits album	—
Collection	Released: 1992; Label: KB (555-2); Note: Greatest hits album	—
Live at the Big Kahuna	Released: 1995; Label: KB (666-2); Note: Live album	—
Celebration	Released: 1996; Label: RAJON (R0091); Note: Greatest hits album	—
Goin' Down Town	Released: 1996; Label: RAJON (CDR0790); Note: Greatest hits album	—
Heartstarter (as Kevin Borich Express)	Released: 1998; Label: Kevin Borich (888-2)	—
One Night Jamm Live (as Kevin Borich Express)	Released: 1999; Label: Kevin Borich (999-2); Note: Live album	—
Nomad	Released: 2004; Label: KB (CD0002)	—
Live at the Basement (with Lucius Borich, Harry Brus)	Released: 2009; Label: SG Productions; Note: Live album	—
Duets	Released: 14 July 2023; Label: Kevin Borich (KBD01)	66
Kevin Borich Express Live (as Kevin Borich Express)	Released: 6 June 2025; Label: Australia Road Crew Association; Note: Live album	—
