= Mondo Rock discography =

- Studio albums: 6
- EPs: 1
- Live albums: 2
- Compilation albums: 7
- Singles: 26

This is the discography of Mondo Rock, an Australian pop rock band that formed in November 1976. The group released six studio albums until their split in 1991. In that time, the group had ten top 40 singles and was one of the most popular acts in Australia during the early 1980s.

== Albums ==
=== Studio albums ===
List of studio albums, with selected chart positions.
Title	Album details	Peak chart positions	Certifications
Title	Album details	AUS	Certifications
Primal Park	Released: October 1979; Label: Avenue. Oz Records, EMI Records (OZS.1014); Formats: LP	40	
Chemistry	Released: July 1981; Label: Avenue Records, Atlantic Records (L37592, K 50843); Formats: LP	3	AUS: 2× Platinum
Nuovo Mondo	Released: July 1982; Label: RCA, Warner Music Group (600124); Formats: LP, MC	7	
The Modern Bop	Released: April 1984; Label: RCA, WEA (250391-1, 250391–4); Formats: LP, MC	5	
Boom Baby Boom	Released: September 1986; Label: Polydor Records, Columbia Records (TWAD404, BFC 40470); Formats: LP, CD	27	
Why Fight It?	Released: November 1990; Label: BMG (VPCD0831); Formats: CD	102	
"—" denotes a recording that did not chart or was not released in that territory.

=== Live albums ===
List of live albums, with selected chart positions.
Title	Album details	Peak chart positions
Title	Album details	AUS
Summer of '81, Live at the Pier	Released: 8 May 2020; Label: Mondo Rock; Formats: Download, streaming	104
Live At Billboard 1985	Released: 4 March 2022; Label: Mondo Rock; Formats: Download, streaming	-

=== Compilation albums ===
List of compilation albums, with selected chart positions.
Title	Album details	Peak chart positions
Title	Album details	AUS
Up to the Moment	Released: June 1985; Label: Polydor Records (825 597); Formats: LP, MC, CD	8
Mondo Rock	Released: 1985; Label: Columbia Records (US) (BFC 40143); Formats: LP	—N/a
Best of Dragon and Mondo Rock	Released: June 1990; Label: J&B Records (JB 418); Formats: LP, CD; (with Dragon)	47
The Essential Mondo Rock	Released: 31 October 2003; Label: Sony Music Australia (5139862000); Formats: 2× CD	70
The Greatest	Released: 15 November 2004; Label: Sony Music Australia (5187502000); Formats: CD	—
Besto Mondo	Released: 1 August 2015; Label: Aztec Records (AVSCD080); Formats: CD, DD	—
The Complete Anthology	Released: 20 October 2017; Label: Bloodlines/ Liberation Records (LMCD0328); Formats: CD, DD	163
"—" denotes a recording that did not chart or was not released in that territory.

== Extended plays ==
List of extended plays.
Title	Album details
Aliens	Released: November 1987; Label: Polydor Records (887 230–1, 887 230–4); Formats: 12" EP, MC, CD

== Singles ==
List of singles, with selected chart positions, showing year released and album name.
Title	Year	Peak chart positions				Album
Title	Year	AUS	NZ	US	US Main.	Album
"The Fugitive Kind"	1978	49	—	—	—	Non-album single
"Love Shock"	1979	—	—	—	—	Non-album single
"Searching for My Baby"	1979	—	—	—	—	Primal Park
"Primal Park"	1979	—	—	—	—	Primal Park
"State of the Heart"	1980	6	—	—	—	Chemistry
"Cool World"	1981	8	—	—	—	Chemistry
"Chemistry"	1981	20	—	—	—	Chemistry
"Summer of '81"	1981	31	—	—	—	Chemistry
"No Time"	1982	11	—	—	—	Nuovo Mondo
"The Queen and Me"	1982	40	—	—	—	Nuovo Mondo
"In Another Love"	1983	86	—	—	—	Nuovo Mondo
"Come Said the Boy"	1983	2	43	—	—	The Modern Bop
"Baby Wants to Rock"	1984	18	—	—	—	The Modern Bop
"The Modern Bop"	1984	85	—	—	—	The Modern Bop
"Good Advice"	1984	56	—	—	—	Up to the Moment
"The Moment"	1985	—	—	—	—	Up to the Moment
"Rule of Threes"	1986	58	—	—	—	Boom Baby Boom
"Primitive Love Rites"	1986	34	40	71	31	Boom Baby Boom
"Boom Baby Boom"	1986	86	—	—	—	Boom Baby Boom
"Aliens Walk Among Us"	1987	—	—	—	—	Aliens (EP)
"Why Fight It?"	1990	96	—	—	—	Why Fight It?
"I Had You in Mind"	1991	94	—	—	—	Why Fight It?
"Soul Reason"	1991	140	—	—	—	Why Fight It?
"The First Time" (Damon Boyd vs Mondo Rock)	2004	79	—	—	—	non-album single
"—" denotes a recording that did not chart or was not released in that territory.
