= The Complete Anthology =

Greatest hits album by Mondo Rock
- Released: 20 October 2017
- Recorded: 1978–1990
- Genre: Rock, pop rock
- Label: BloodLine Records / Liberation Music

Mondo Rock chronology
Besto Mondo (2015)	The Complete Anthology (2017)	Summer of '81, Live at the Pier (2020)

The Complete Anthology is a compilation album by Australian rock band Mondo Rock, released in October 2017 through BloodLine Records / Liberation Music. The Complete Anthology includes all the hits, plus album tracks and rarities, from their 1978 debut single "The Fugitive Kind" to 1991's "Soul Reason".

Mondo Rock will tour in support of the album in June 2018.

== Track listing ==
CD1

No.	Title	Writer(s)	Album	Length
1.	"The Fugitive Kind"	Ross Wilson; Tony Slavich	non-album single	3:34
2.	"Searching for My Baby"	Wilson	Primal Park	2:51
3.	"Love Shock"	Peter Laffy; Wilson	non-album single	3:09
4.	"Primal Park"	David Pepperell; Wilson	Primal Park	4:13
5.	"State of the Heart"	Eric McCusker	Chemistry	4:16
6.	"Summer of '81"	McCusker	Chemistry	3:56
7.	"Chemistry"	McCusker; Paul Christie	Chemistry	4:25
8.	"Cool World"	Wilson	Chemistry	3:33
9.	"Step Up, Step Out"	McCusker	Chemistry	3:27
10.	"Mondo Sexo"	Wilson	Chemistry	3:01
11.	"Tied Up in Knots"	McCusker	non-album single	4:49
12.	"No Time"	McCusker	Nuovo Mondo	4:04
13.	"The Queen and Me"	McCusker	Nuovo Mondo	3:28
14.	"In Another Love"	McCusker	Nuovo Mondo	3:54
15.	"A Touch of Paradise"	Gulliver Smith; Wilson	Nuovo Mondo	4:17

CD2

No.	Title	Writer(s)	Album	Length
1.	"Come Said the Boy"	McCusker	The Modern Bop	5:33
2.	"Baby Wants to Rock"	James Black; Wilson	The Modern Bop	5:37
3.	"The Modern Bop"	Wilson	The Modern Bop	5:43
4.	"Marina"	McCusker	The Modern Bop	4:57
5.	"Cost of Living"	McCusker; John James Hackett; James Black; James Gillard; Wilson	The Modern Bop	4:06
6.	"Good Advice"	McCusker	Up to the Moment	4:23
7.	"The Moment"	McCusker	Up to the Moment	3:38
8.	"Dark Secrets"	McCusker	B-side to "Good Advice"	5:16
9.	"Rule of Threes"	McCusker	Boom Baby Boom	4:07
10.	"Primitive Love Rites"	Hackett; Wilson	Boom Baby Boom	4:50
11.	"Boom Baby Boom"	McCusker; Wilson; Hackett	Boom Baby Boom	4:18
12.	"Aliens Walk Among Us"	Wilson	Aliens (EP)	4:14
13.	"Why Fight It"	McCusker	Why Fight It?	5:27
14.	"I Had You in Mind"	McCusker	Why Fight It?	4:17
15.	"Soul Reason"	McCusker	Why Fight It?	4:30

== Charts ==
Chart (2017)	Peak position
Australian Albums (ARIA Charts)	163
Australian Independent Albums (AIR)	8

== Release history ==
Region	Date	Format	Edition(s)	Label	Catalogue
Australia	20 October 2017	CD; digital download	Standard	BloodLine Records / Liberation Music	LMCD0328
