= Besto Mondo =

Greatest hits album by Mondo Rock
- Released: 7 August 2015
- Recorded: 1980–1990
- Genre: Rock, pop rock
- Label: Aztec Music
- Producer: John Sayers, Mark Moffatt, Peter McIan, Bill Drescher, Waddy Wachtel

Mondo Rock chronology
The Greatest (2004)	Besto Mondo (2015)	The Complete Anthology (2017)

Besto Mondo is a compilation album by Australian rock band Mondo Rock, released in August 2015 by Aztec Music. The album includes remastered versions of the band's hits. Upon release, band member Ross Wilson said "We start the compilation with "Come Said the Boy" of course, because that's become our biggest perennial, but you can play this record all the way through and it holds your attention. You hear one song and then another one comes along and grabs you, rather than it sounds the same, so I've tried to programme it so it flows really well."

The album was promoted with a national Besto Mondo tour.

In an interview with Weekend Notes, band member Paul Christie said "We toured in 2014 for the first time in 24 years, with the original line up and played to sold out shows around the country to rave reviews. We are getting a whole new generation of fans coming to the concerts and having that same emotional connection, largely due to the Mondo Rock songs being constantly played on the radio."

== Track listing ==
No.	Title	Writer(s)	Album	Length
1.	"Come Said the Boy"	Eric McCusker	The Modern Bop	5:15
2.	"Chemistry"	McCusker; Paul Christie	Chemistry	4:22
3.	"Summer of '81"	McCusker	Chemistry	3:55
4.	"State of the Heart"	McCusker	Chemistry	4:17
5.	"Cool World"	Ross Wilson	Chemistry	3:33
6.	"No Time"	McCusker	Nuovo Mondo	4:01
7.	"The Queen and Me"	McCusker	Nuovo Mondo	3:21
8.	"In Another Love"	McCusker	Nuovo Mondo	3:57
9.	"The Moment" (Extended mix)	McCusker	Up to the Moment	4:03
10.	"Good Advice"	McCusker	Up to the Moment	3:43
11.	"Baby Wants to Rock"	James Black; Wilson	The Modern Bop	4:29
12.	"The Modern Bop" (Jellybean Mix)	Wilson	The Modern Bop	3:46
13.	"Rules of Three"	McCusker	Boom Baby Boom	4:04
14.	"Boom Baby Boom"	McCusker; Wilson; John James Hackett	Boom Baby Boom	5:16
15.	"Primitive Love Rites"	Hackett; Wilson	Boom Baby Boom	4:50
16.	"I Had You in Mind"	McCusker, J. Van Tongeren, C. Leiberman	Why Fight It?	4:19

== Release history ==
Region	Date	Format	Edition(s)	Label	Catalogue
Australia	7 August 2015	CD; digital download	Standard	Aztec Music	AVSCD080
