= The Greatest (Mondo Rock album) =

Greatest hits album by Mondo Rock
- Released: 15 November 2004
- Recorded: 1980–1990
- Genre: Rock, pop rock
- Label: Sony Music Australia, Liberation Music
- Producer: Bill Drescher, Chris Corr, Jim Barton, John L Sayers, Mark Moffatt, Mondo Rock, Peter McIan, Waddy Wachtel

Mondo Rock chronology
The Essential Mondo Rock (2004)	The Greatest (2004)	Besto Mondo (2015)

Alternative cover
- The Greatest Hits (2017)

The Greatest is a compilation album by Australian rock band Mondo Rock, originally released on 15 November 2004 by Sony Music Australia.

The album was re-released in 2017 under the title The Greatest Hits by Liberation Music.

== Background ==
Mondo Rock were formed in 1976 by mainstay singer-songwriter, Ross Wilson. The band released 6 studio albums between 1979 and 1990. The group had ten top 40 singles and was one of the most popular acts in Australia during the early 1980s.

== Track listing ==
No.	Title	Writer(s)	Album	Length
1.	"Come Said the Boy"	Eric McCusker	The Modern Bop	5:15
2.	"Summer of '81"	McCusker	Chemistry	3:55
3.	"Chemistry"	McCusker; Paul Christie	Chemistry	4:22
4.	"Cool World"	Ross Wilson	Chemistry	3:33
5.	"State of the Heart"	McCusker	Chemistry	4:17
6.	"No Time"	McCusker	Nuovo Mondo	4:01
7.	"The Modern Bop" (Jellybean Mix)	Wilson	The Modern Bop	3:46
8.	"Primitive Love Rites"	J. J. Hackett; Wilson	Boom Baby Boom	4:50
9.	"Winds Light to Variable"	Wilson; McCusker; Hackett; Black; Gillard	non album track	4:14
10.	"The Moment" (NY mix)	McCusker	Up to the Moment	4:03
11.	"Why Fight It"	McCusker; Wilson	Why Fight It?	4:58
12.	"A Woman Like You"	McCusker; Wilson; Hackett	Aliens	3:58
13.	"Boom Baby Boom"	McCusker; Wilson; Hackett	Boom Baby Boom	4:20
14.	"Dark Secrets"	McCusker	non-album track	5:17
15.	"Cost of Living"	McCusker; Wilson; Hackett; Gillard; Black	The Modern Bop	3:40
16.	"I'm Free"	Mick Jagger; Keith Richards	Aliens	3:37
17.	"The First Time" (Ivan Gough's Starfish remix)	McCusker	The Greatest	3:16

== Release history ==
Region	Date	Format	Edition(s)	Label	Catalogue
Australia	15 November 2004	CD	Standard	Sony Music Australia	5187502000
Australia	24 January 2017	digital download	Standard	Liberation Music	
Australia	17 April 2017	CD	Standard	Liberation Music	LMCD0313
