= The Essential Mondo Rock =

Greatest hits album by Mondo Rock
- Released: 31 October 2003
- Recorded: 1980–1990
- Genre: Rock, Pop rock
- Label: Sony Music Australia
- Producer: Bill Drescher, Chris Corr, Jim Barton, John L Sayers, Mark Moffatt, Mondo Rock, Peter McIan, Waddy Wachtel

Mondo Rock chronology
Why Fight It? (1990)	The Essential Mondo Rock (2003)	The Greatest (2004)

The Essential Mondo Rock is a 2 disc compilation album by Australian rock band Mondo Rock, released in October 2003 by Sony Music Australia. It peaked at number 70 on the ARIA Charts in November 2003.

== Background and release ==
Mondo Rock were formed in Melbourne in 1977 and were a staple of the Australian rock scene throughout the 1980s with 4 top 10 albums and a string of hit singles. Disc 1 features hits and singles, while disc 2 features non-album singles, instrumentals, live tracks and two songs never before heard on disc. The album was released to coincide with the Here & Now concert tour.

== Track listing ==
Disc 1

1. "No Time" (Eric McCusker) – 4:01
2. "Summer of '81" (McCusker) – 3:49
3. "State of the Heart" (McCusker) – 4:18
4. "Cool World" (Ross Wilson) – 3:34
5. "Chemistry" (McCusker, Paul Christie) – 3:39
6. "The Queen and Me" (McCusker) – 3:21
7. "A Touch of Paradise" (Gulliver Smith, Wilson) – 4:13
8. "Come Said the Boy" (McCusker) – 5:15
9. "The Modern Bop" (Jellybean mix) (Wilson) – 3:46
10. "Baby Wants to Rock" (James Black, Wilson) – 4:31
11. "The Moment" (NY mix) (McCusker) – 3:39
12. "Rule of Threes" (McCusker) – 4:06
13. "Boom Baby Boom" (McCusker, J. J. Hackett, Wilson) – 4:20
14. "Primitive Love Rites" (Hackett, Wilson) – 4:51
15. "Why Fight It" (McCusker, Wilson) – 5:27
16. "I Had You in Mind" (McCusker) – 4:17
17. "Soul Reason" (McCusker, Harry Bogdanovs) – 4:28

Disc 2

1. "Il Mondo Caffe" (Black, Wilson) – 2:44
2. "Mondo Sexo" (Wilson) – 3:02
3. "Domination" (Black, Christie, Wilson) – 4:26
4. "Winds Light to Variable" (McCusker, Hackett, Black, James Gillard, Wilson) – 3:51
5. "Moves" (live) (McCusker) – 4:00
6. "Mona Lisa" (live) (McCusker) – 3:52
7. "Tied Up in Knots" (live) (McCusker) – 4:51
8. "Slice of Life" (live) (McCusker) – 4:00
9. "We're No Angels" (live) (Wilson) – 6:27
10. "The Fugitive Kind" (live) (Wilson, Tony Slavich) – 3:35
11. "Aliens Walk Among Us" (Wilson) – 4:14
12. "Dark Secrets" (McCusker) – 5:16

== Charts ==
The Essential Mondo Rock debuted at number 94 on the ARIA Charts and peaked at number 70 on 17 November 2003.

Chart performance for The Essential Mondo Rock
Chart (2003)	Peak position
Australian Albums (ARIA)	19

== Release history ==
Region	Date	Format	Edition(s)	Label	Catalogue
Australia	31 October 2003	CD	Standard	Sony Music Australia	5139862000
