= Up to the Moment =

Compilation album by Mondo Rock
- Released: June 1985
- Recorded: 1978–1985
- Genre: Rock, pop rock
- Length: 44:59
- Label: Polydor
- Producer: Ernie Rose, John L Sayers, Ross Wilson

Mondo Rock chronology
The Modern Bop (1984)	Up to the Moment (1985)	Boom Baby Boom (1986)

Singles from Up to the Moment
- 1. "Good Advice" Released: December 1984; 2. "The Moment" Released: April 1985

Up to the Moment is the first compilation album by Australian rock band Mondo Rock, which was released in June 1985 through Polydor Records. It peaked at number 8 on the Kent Music Report albums chart.

== Background ==
Mondo Rock were formed in 1976 and released four studio albums by 1985, Primal Park (October 1979), Chemistry (July 1981), Nuovo Mondo (July 1982) and The Modern Bop (March 1984). Up to the Moment is a compilation album of tracks from those albums; it also includes their debut single, "The Fugitive Kind" (1978) and two new singles "Good Advice" (December 1984) and "The Moment" (April 1985).

== Track listing ==
All tracks are written by Eric McCusker, unless otherwise noted.

Side A
No.	Title	Length
1.	"Good Advice"	3:43
2.	"The Moment"	3:34
3.	"Come Said the Boy"	4:42
4.	"The Modern Bop" (Ross Wilson)	3:47
5.	"No Time"	4:01
6.	"Baby Wants to Rock" (James Black, Wilson)	5:20
7.	"Dark Secrets"	4:38

Side B
No.	Title	Length
1.	"Cool World" (Wilson)	3:34
2.	"Summer of '81"	3:56
3.	"Chemistry"	3:39
4.	"The Queen and Me"	3:21
5.	"The Fugitive Kind" (Wilson, Tony Slavich)	3:35
6.	"State of the Heart"	4:17
7.	"Winds Light to Variable (Instrumental)" (Wilson, McCusker, Hackett, Gillard, Black)	3:59
Total length:		56:22

== Charts ==
Chart (1985)	Peak position
Australia (Kent Music Report)	8
