= The Best of Dragon and Mondo Rock =

Compilation album by Mondo Rock & Dragon
- Released: June 1990
- Genre: Rock, pop rock
- Label: J & B Records

Dragon chronology
Bondi Road (1989)	The Best of Dragon and Mondo Rock (1990)	Cuts from the Tough Times (1990)

Mondo Rock chronology
Aliens (1987)	The Best of Mondo Rock and Dragon (1990)	Why Fight It? (1990)

The Best of Dragon and Mondo Rock is a collaborative compilation album by Australian rock band Mondo Rock and New Zealand band Dragon, released in June 1990. The album peaked at number 47 on the ARIA Charts.

== Track listing ==
Side A - Dragon
No.	Title	Writer(s)	Length
1.	"Rain"	Johanna Pigott, Marc Hunter, Todd Hunter	3:40
2.	"Body and the Beat"	Marc Hunter, Robert Taylor	4:26
3.	"Magic"	Marc Hunter, Roger Taylor, Robert Taylor	3:57
4.	"Speak No Evil"	Alan Mansfield, Johanna Pigott, Todd Hunter	4:00
5.	"Dreams of Ordinary Men"	Alan Mansfield, Marc Hunter, Sharon O'Neill, Todd Rundgren	4:02
6.	"Fool"	Johanna Pigott, Todd Hunter	3:31
7.	"Still in Love With You" (live)	Paul Hewson	3:27
8.	"Are You Old Enough?" (live)	Marc Hunter, Paul Hewson	4:08
9.	"April Sun in Cuba" (live)	Paul Hewson	3:29

Side B - Mondo Rock
No.	Title	Writer(s)	Length
1.	"No Time"	Eric McCusker	4:02
2.	"The Queen and Me"	Eric McCusker	3:21
3.	"Come Said the Boy"	Eric McCusker	5:31
4.	"Chemistry"	Eric McCusker	3:39
5.	"Primitive Love Rites"	John James Hackett, Ross Wilson	4:48
6.	"Boom Baby Boom"	Eric McCusker, John James Hackett, Ross Wilson	4:20
7.	"Cool World"	Ross Wilson	3:32
8.	"Summer of '81"	Eric McCusker	3:38
9.	"State of the Heart"	Eric McCusker	4:16

== Charts ==
Chart (1990)	Peak position
Australian Albums (ARIA)	47

== Personnel ==
Dragon

- Marc Hunter – vocals (1973–1979, 1982–1997)
- Todd Hunter – bass guitar, vocals (1972–1995, 2006–present)
- Jeffrey Bartolomei – keyboards (1989–1996)
- Mike Caen – guitar (1989–1995, 1996–1997)

Mondo Rock

- Ross Wilson – vocals, guitar, harmonica (1976–1991)
- James Gillard – bass guitar (1982–1990)
- Duncan Veall – keyboards (1984–1990)
- Eric McCusker – guitar, keyboards (1980–1991)
- John James Hackett – drums, percussion, guitar (1981–1990)
