= Paul Christie (musician) =

Australian rock musician

- Birth name: Paul Adrian Christie
- Born: 1953 (age 71–72); Brisbane, Queensland, Australia
- Genres: Rock
- Occupation: Musician
- Instruments: Bass guitar; vocals
- Years active: 1976–present

Paul Adrian Christie (born 1953) is an Australian rock bassist and vocalist. He was a member of various groups including Kevin Borich Express (1978–79), Mondo Rock (1980–82) and the Party Boys (1982–90, 1992, 1998–99). As a member of Mondo Rock he performed on the tracks, "State of the Heart", "Cool World", "Summer of '81", "Chemistry", "No Time", "The Queen and Me" and "In Another Love".

== Biography ==
Paul Adrian Christie was born in 1953 and grew up in Brisbane. By 1976 he was a member of a group, Feet First, followed by Silverwing, Bobby Warren & Co & Loose Booty before joining hard rockers, Kevin Borich Express, in May 1978 in Sydney. He replaced Bob Jackson on bass guitar alongside Kevin Borich on lead guitar and lead vocals and John Annas on drums.

The group toured the United States, where they added the American keyboardist, Tim Schafer (ex-Gary Wright Band) and recorded tracks at Cherokee Studios, Los Angeles. While in LA they performed two shows at Starwood Theatre with a set list, "'Going Somewhere', 'Celebration', 'KB's Boogie', 'Going Down Town', 'No Turning Back' and 'New City Lights'." This line-up issued a studio album, No Turning Back, in March 1979, with Tom Serfert producing. In the following month Christie and Schafer both left.

In April 1980 Christie joined Mondo Rock in Melbourne on bass guitar with James Black (ex-Rum Jungle, Russell Morris Band) on keyboards and guitar; Gil Matthews (ex-Billy Thorpe & the Aztecs) on drums; Eric McCusker (ex-the Captain Matchbox Whoopee Band) on guitar; and Ross Wilson (ex-Daddy Cool) on lead vocals and harmonica. As a member of that group he performed on the albums, Chemistry (July 1981) and Nuovo Mondo (July 1982).

The albums provided the singles, "State of the Heart" (October 1980), "Cool World" (March 1981), "Chemistry" (July), "Summer of '81" (October), "No Time" (June 1982), "The Queen and Me" (September) and "In Another Love" (March 1983). He co-wrote the tracks, "Chemistry" from the album of that name, and, "Domination", from Nuovo Mondo (and B-side of "The Queen and Me"). By September 1982 Christie had left that group.

Christie then founded an Australian rock ensemble, the Party Boys, in November 1982 in Sydney. The initial line-up was former bandmate Borich on guitar, Graham "Buzz" Bidstrup, (ex-the Angels) on drums, Harvey James (ex-Mississippi, Ariel, Sherbet) on guitar and James Reyne (on loan from Australian Crawl) on lead vocals. From his memoirs:

'Upon leaving Mondo Rock in late 1982 I returned to Sydney and took a break on the northern beaches. I thought about options for the future and devised the concept of The Party Boys. Australian Crawl singer James Reyne & I had become friends whilst I was living in Melbourne. We shared a common belief that as musicians, we were not receiving the best financial returns based on the success experienced in our respective bands. This was the way the music business was structured coming out of the ‘70’s into the early ‘80’s."

"I believed a line-up of musicians from a number of known bands performing together for an interim period, managed and coordinated by myself, would succeed, for the benefit of the musicians. In October of 1982 I approached the manager of Moby Dick Surfers Club, Graham Chatfield and proposed two concert dates for Nov 14th & 21st 1982. He accepted and booked the yet unrehearsed band. James was in Sydney filming Return to Eden, he had available time. I called guitarist Ian Moss (Cold Chisel) who was unavailable however his housemate Harvey James (Ariel, Sherbet) was and agreed to participate. I had worked with The Angels fleetingly and become friends with drummer Graham Bidstrup, he joined along with Kevin Borich who had employed me as bass player from 1977-1979 in the Kevin Borich Express."

"The Nov 14th date was wildly successful, the band then performed at The Astra Hotel Bondi, The National Hotel Brisbane, The Manly Vale Hotel then Moby’s again on the 21st. A live album Live at Several 21st's was recorded by Keith Walker of 2JJJ at Manly Vale." Released by EMI Records it received gold record certification. The band went through several incarnations over the next decade.

Christie was a founding partner of Almost Famous , a corporate team building and events company. He has participated in reformations of Mondo Rock. In 2006 with the line-up of Christie, Black, McCusker and Wilson, they performed on the 2006 Countdown Spectacular concert series playing a medley of "Cool World" and "Summer of '81" and a full version of "Come Said the Boy". In June 2014 they reunited to perform Chemistry live at a series of gigs at Australian state capitals. The line-up was Christie, Black, Mathews, McCusker, and Wilson. They released a compilation album, Besto Mondo, in August 2015.
