= Pat Wilson =

Australian singer and journalist (born 1948)

- Born: Patricia Mary Higgins; 11 June 1948 (age 78); Australia
- Other name: Mummy Cool
- Occupations: Journalist, singer
- Employer: Go-Set
- Spouse: Ross Wilson (m. 1969–1989)
- Children: 1

Patricia Mary Wilson (née Higgins; born 11 June 1948) is an Australian singer and journalist. Wilson wrote for Go-Set, a 1960s and 1970s pop music newspaper, under the pen-name "Mummy Cool" during 1971–1972. Wilson released several singles in the early 1980s including the hit single "Bop Girl". The song was written by her then husband Ross Wilson of the bands Daddy Cool and Mondo Rock. Pat currently resides in the Melbourne suburb of Elwood.

== Biography ==
=== Early years ===
Little is known about Pat Wilson's early years.

She first saw Ross Wilson perform with his band The Pink Finks in about 1965, when she was sixteen. They met when he was working for the Department of Supply. In 1969, Ross left Australia for England to become a member of Procession. Wilson joined him there; they married and returned to Australia.

Ross and three bandmates formed Daddy Cool in 1970 and toured Australia. In early 1971 they performed at the Myponga Festival in South Australia. Outdoor concert footage taken at the festival was included in the music video directed by Chris Löfvén for Daddy Cool’s 1971 song "Eagle Rock". In this footage, a pregnant Pat Wilson can be seen briefly in the front row at the 1min 53sec mark of the music video clapping her hands. In addition, both Pat (still visibly pregnant) and Ross also appear in Chris Löfvén's short film Part Two - The Beginning.

The Wilsons' son Daniel was born just as "Eagle Rock" reached No. 1 on the National singles charts. At about this time, Wilson started writing her column for Go-Set taking over an advice column called "Dear Lesley Pixie" and using the pen-name "Mummy Cool". Wilson also appeared in a documentary about the band, singing with Rock Granite and the Profiles, a group which featured future members of Jo Jo Zep and the Falcons.

In 1975, Wilson appeared on Australian band Skyhooks' second album Ego is not a Dirty Word playing finger cymbals on the title track, "Ego is not a Dirty Word". Ross produced the album.

=== "Bop Girl" ===
In September 1983, Wilson released "Bop Girl", a song written by Ross which peaked at number 2 in Australia; and achieved airplay in the United States, where it peaked at No. 104 on the Billboard pop chart. Ross also provided backing vocals and appeared in its music video.

Eric McCusker of Mondo Rock, when interviewed in Juke Magazine in 1983, was asked whether he could have written something like "Bop Girl", he replied:

"No, that's a very Ross Wilson song isn't it? That's been around for about four years. I think Ross did a demo with some guys from the first Mondo line up and we all liked the song but it was obvious it wasn't a Mondo Rock sound. But that's what I say about doing other things aside from Mondo Rock: it's healthy and you don't feel restricted as a result."

A single "Strong Love" was released in May 1984 and peaked at number 26. This was following by the 5-track mini-album Strong Love. This mini-album was issued in the US as Bop Girl.

=== Personal life ===
Wilson was married to musician Ross Wilson for 20 years, according to her account on ABC-TV's Talking Heads on 9 July 2007, where Peter Thompson interviewed Ross. They have a son, Daniel, born in 1971.

== Discography ==
=== Albums ===
- Strong Love (1984 Warner Music Group)

=== Singles ===
- "Bop Girl" / "Tacky" (1983) AUS No. 2
- Shimmy Shimmy Koko Bop (1984)
- "Strong Love" (1984) AUS No. 26

== Awards and nominations ==
=== Countdown Music Awards ===
Countdown was an Australian pop music TV series on national broadcaster ABC-TV from 1974–1987 and it presented music awards from 1979–1987, known as the Countdown Music Awards.

Year	Nominee / work	Award	Result
1983	"Bop Girl"	Best Debut Single	Won
1983	"Bop Girl"	Best Promotional Video	Nominated
1983	herself	Most Popular Female Artist	Nominated
