= Strong Love =

Single by Pat Wilson

from the album Strong Love
- Released: May 1984
- Studio: Festival and AAV Studios
- Genre: pop
- Length: 3:56
- Label: WEA
- Songwriter(s): Ross Wilson,
- Producer(s): Ross Wilson, Mark Moffatt, Ricky Fataar

Pat Wilson singles chronology
"Bop Girl" (1983)	"Strong Love" (1984)

"Strong Love" is a song recorded by Australian pop singer Pat Wilson. The song as written by her husband, Ross Wilson of the bands Daddy Cool and Mondo Rock.

"Strong Love" was released in May 1984. It peaked at number 26 on the Kent Music Report.

== Track listing ==
7" Vinyl (WEA – 7-259578)

1. "Strong Love" - 3:56
2. "Tacky Too" - 3:25

== Charts ==
Chart (1984)	Position
Australian Kent Music Report	26
