= Rule of Threes (song) =

Single by Mondo Rock

from the album Boom Baby Boom
- Released: August 1986
- Genre: Rock, pop rock
- Length: 3:58 (Album version), 7:05 (Extended version)
- Label: Polydor Records
- Songwriter(s): Eric McCusker
- Producer(s): Bill Drescher

Mondo Rock singles chronology
"The Moment" (1985)	"Rule of Threes" (1986)	"Primitive Love Rites" (1986)

Rule of Threes is the seventeen single by Australian band Mondo Rock, released in 1986. It was released as a first single from Mondo Rock's fifth studio album Boom Baby Boom. The song reached at number 58 on the Kent Music Report. The song was written by Mondo Rock's guitarist Eric McCusker.

== Track listing ==
AUS 7" Single

No.	Title	Writer(s)	Length
1.	"Rule of Threes"	Eric McCusker	3:58
2.	"Roman Holiday"	Eric McCusker	3:15

== Charts ==
Chart (1986)	Peak position
Australia (Kent Music Report)	58

== Personnel ==
- Ross Wilson – vocals, guitar, harmonica (1976–1991)
- John James Hackett – drums, percussion, guitar (1981–1990)
- James Gillard – bass guitar (1982–1990)
- Andrew Ross – saxophone, keyboards (1986–1990)
- Eric McCusker – guitar, keyboards (1980–1991)
- Duncan Veall – keyboards (1984–1990)

Production

- Bill Drescher - Producer (tracks 1 & 2)
