= Bop Girl =

1983 single by Pat Wilson

Single by Pat Wilson

from the album Strong Love
- B-side: "Tacky"
- Released: September 1983
- Studio: Rhinoceros
- Genre: Pop
- Length: 3:33
- Label: WEA
- Songwriter: Ross Wilson
- Producers: Ross Wilson; Mark Moffatt; Ricky Fataar

Pat Wilson singles chronology
"Bop Girl" (1983)	"Strong Love" (1984)

Audio
- "Bop Girl" on YouTube

"Bop Girl" is the debut single of Australian pop singer Pat Wilson. The song was written by her then-husband, Ross Wilson of the bands Daddy Cool and Mondo Rock. "Bop Girl" was released in September 1983, peaking at number two on the Australian Kent Music Report, number 10 in New Zealand and number 28 in South Africa. At the 1983 Countdown Music Awards, the song won Best Debut Single. Wilson was also nominated for Most Popular Female Performer and "Bop Girl" was nominated for Best Promotional Video.

== Music video ==
Film maker Gillian Armstrong directed "Bop Girl"'s music video. It is the screen debut of 15-year-old Nicole Kidman playing the role of one of three young "bop girls". Kidman was chosen by Armstrong; songwriter Ross Wilson recalled that Kidman was to represent "an up and coming starlet with a bright future." Kidman herself insisted that the video be used for both a BBC documentary about her career, and in an American Cinematheque tribute (November 2003), with the result that the video returned to Australian music video play lists in 2004. The music video was shot in South Coogee. Much of the video was a pixilation animation in time with the music. At the Countdown Australian Music Awards for 1983, it was nominated for Best Promotional Video.

== Track listings ==
7-inch vinyl (WEA – 7–259854)

1. "Bop Girl" – 3:51
2. "Tacky" – 3:17

12-inch vinyl (WEA – 0–259850)

1. "Bop Girl" – 4:33
2. "Tacky" – 3:17

== Charts ==
=== Weekly charts ===
Chart (1983–1984)	Peak position
Australia (Kent Music Report)	2
New Zealand (Recorded Music NZ)	10
South Africa (Springbok Radio)	28

=== Year-end charts ===
Chart (1983)	Position
Australia (Kent Music Report)	11

== In popular culture ==
"Bop Girl" was featured in the short-lived 1980s American sci-fi show Otherworld episode "Rock n' Roll Suicide", with the two young members of the family performing it in a talent show. The song was featured as the title song for the short-lived Being Lara Bingle.
