= Bondi Road (album) =

Studio album by Dragon
- Released: 10 April 1989
- Recorded: 1987−88
- Genre: New wave
- Length: 52:46
- Label: RCA Records, Wheatley Records
- Producer: David Hirschfelder

Dragon chronology
| So Far: Their Classic Collection (1988) | Bondi Road (1989) | The Best of Dragon and Mondo Rock (1990) |

Singles from Bondi Road
- 1. "Celebration" Released: November 1987; 2. "Young Years" Released: 3 April 1989; 3. "Here Am I" Released: 5 June 1989; 4. "Summer" Released: 18 September 1989; 5. "Book of Love" Released: 19 March 1990

Bondi Road is the ninth studio album by Australian-New Zealand rock band Dragon, released in April 1989. It was the last album of new material to be released during Marc Hunter's lifetime.

== Track listing ==
1. "Young Years" (Alan Mansfield, Sharon O'Neill) – 3:58
2. "Blue Blue" (Marc Hunter, Todd Hunter) – 4:16
3. "Book of Love" (Johanna Pigott, T. Hunter) – 4:21
4. "Here Am I" (A. Mansfield, M. Hunter) – 5:17
5. "Ice in this Town" (A. Mansfield, Sharon O'Neill) – 4:17
6. "Gold in the River" (Brent Thomas, M. Hunter, Mike Caen) – 4:15
7. "Bondi Road" (J. Pigott, M. Hunter, T. Hunter) – 4:07
8. "Summer" (David Hirschfelder, M. Hunter, Wendy Hunter) – 3:44
9. "Family Man" (D. Hirschfelder, M. Hunter) – 5:14
10. "Runaway" (A. Mansfield, S. O'Neill) – 3:50
11. "Good Time Girl" (A. Mansfield, S. O'Neill) – 5:03
12. "Celebration" (Kool & The Gang, Ronald Bell) – 3:54

== Charts ==
=== Weekly charts ===
| Chart (1989) | Peak position |
|---|---|
| Australian Albums (ARIA) | 22 |
| New Zealand Albums (RMNZ) | 19 |

=== Year-end charts ===
| Chart (1989) | Position |
|---|---|
| ARIA Albums Chart | 83 |

== Certifications ==
| Region | Certification | Certified units/sales |
|---|---|---|
| Australia (ARIA) | Gold | 35,000^{^} |
^{^} Shipments figures based on certification alone.

== Personnel ==
- Backing vocals – Mary Azzopardi, Wendy Matthews
- Bass, backing vocals – Todd Hunter
- Guitar – Mike Caen
- Keyboards – Alan Mansfield, David Hirschfelder, Lee Borkman
- Vocals – Marc Hunter

Production

- Mixed by Carey Taylor
- Producer – David Hirschfelder, Dragon
- Producuction assistant, engineer [Master of Midi] – Andy Sidari
- Recorded by John Harvey
- Additional recording by Adam Chapman, Andy Sidari, Carey Taylor, David Hemmings, Steve Bywaters
- Remixed by Carey Taylor
- Mix engineer – David Hemmings
- Arranged by Carey Taylor, David Hirschfelder, Dragon
