= Summer (Dragon song) =

Single by Dragon

from the album Bondi Road
- B-side: "Heart of Fire"
- Released: 18 September 1989
- Genre: Pop rock
- Length: 3:44
- Label: RCA
- Songwriter(s): Marc Hunter, David Hirschfelder, Wendy Hunter
- Producer(s): Dragon, David Hirschfelder

Dragon singles chronology
"Here Am I" (1989)	"Summer" (1989)	"Book of Love" (1990)

"Summer" is a song by Australian-New Zealand group Dragon, released on 18 September 1989 as the fourth single to be released from the group's ninth studio album Bondi Road (1989). "Summer" peaked at No. 57 on the ARIA charts.

== Track listing ==
1. "Summer" (Marc Hunter, David Hirschfelder, Wendy Hunter) - 3:44
2. "Heart of Fire" (Marc Hunter) -

== Charts ==
Chart (1989)	Peak position
Australian (ARIA Charts)	57
