= The Fabulaires =

Australian R&B band

- Origin: Adelaide, South Australia, Australia
- Genres: R&B
- Years active: 1979–1981
- Labels: Rough Diamond
- Past members: Greg Champion; John James "J.J." Hackett; Jane Lewis; Ian McDonald; Jo Moore; Mick Teakle

The Fabulaires were an Australian R&B group formed in Adelaide by Greg Champion on guitar and lead vocals, John James "J.J." Hackett on drums (ex-Stars), Jane Lewis on vocals, Ian McDonald on bass guitar (ex-Stars), Jo Moore on vocals and Mick Teakle on guitar. They relocated to Melbourne in the following year where Wayne Burt joined on guitar and vocals (ex-Daddy Cool, Jo Jo Zep & The Falcons).

They recorded their debut six-track extended play, Apocalypso. Two tracks, "The Remedy" and "Ghost Riders" were recorded in July 1980; a third track, "Sunglasses", was recorded in December; and the final three tracks were recorded live at the Aberdeen Hotel in Fitzroy North in March 1981. Hackett left to join Mondo Rock and was replaced by Geoff Hassell on drums.

While touring, Moore died in a car accident in April 1981. The group broke up and the EP was released posthumously, late that year, on Rough Diamond Records. The EP peaked at number 52 on the Australian Charts.

Champion and Teakle joined Adelaide-based group, Young Homebuyers, which issued two singles followed by an eponymous EP in October 1982. From 1981 Champion was a radio presenter, as a member of Coodabeen Champions, on the Coodabeens Footy Show and The Saturday Soiree. Burt was a member of the Black Sorrows from 1983 to 1985, from 1988 to 1991 and again in 1998. Hackett remained with Mondo Rock until 1990.

== Discography ==
- Apocalypso (late 1981) – Rough Diamond (RDM 8802)

No.	Title	Writer(s)	Length
1.	"The Remedy"	Wayne Burt	3:50
2.	"Ghost Riders"	Stan Jones	2:53
3.	"Sunglasses"	Burt	3:35
4.	"Too Bad"	Burt	2:55
5.	"Problem of Mine"	Greg Champion	2:44
6.	"I Knew This Would Happen"	Champion	2:32
Total length:			18:29
