= Here Am I (Dragon song) =

Single by Dragon

from the album Bondi Road
- B-side: "Good Time Girl"
- Released: 5 June 1989
- Recorded: 1988
- Genre: Pop rock
- Length: 5:19
- Label: RCA
- Songwriter(s): Marc Hunter, Alan Mansfield
- Producer(s): Dragon, David Hirschfelder

Dragon singles chronology
"Young Years" (1989)	"Here Am I" (1989)	"Summer" (1989)

"Here Am I" is a song by Australian-New Zealand group Dragon, released on 5 June 1989 as the third single from the group's ninth studio album Bondi Road (1989). "Here Am I" peaked at No. 77 on the ARIA charts.

== Track listing ==
1. "Here Am I" (Marc Hunter, Alan Mansfield) – 5:19
2. "Good Time Girl" (Alan Mansfield, Sharon O'Neill) – 5:07

== Charts ==
Chart (1989)	Peak position
Australian (ARIA Charts)	77
