= Peter Thompson (broadcaster) =

Australian broadcaster (1952–2026)

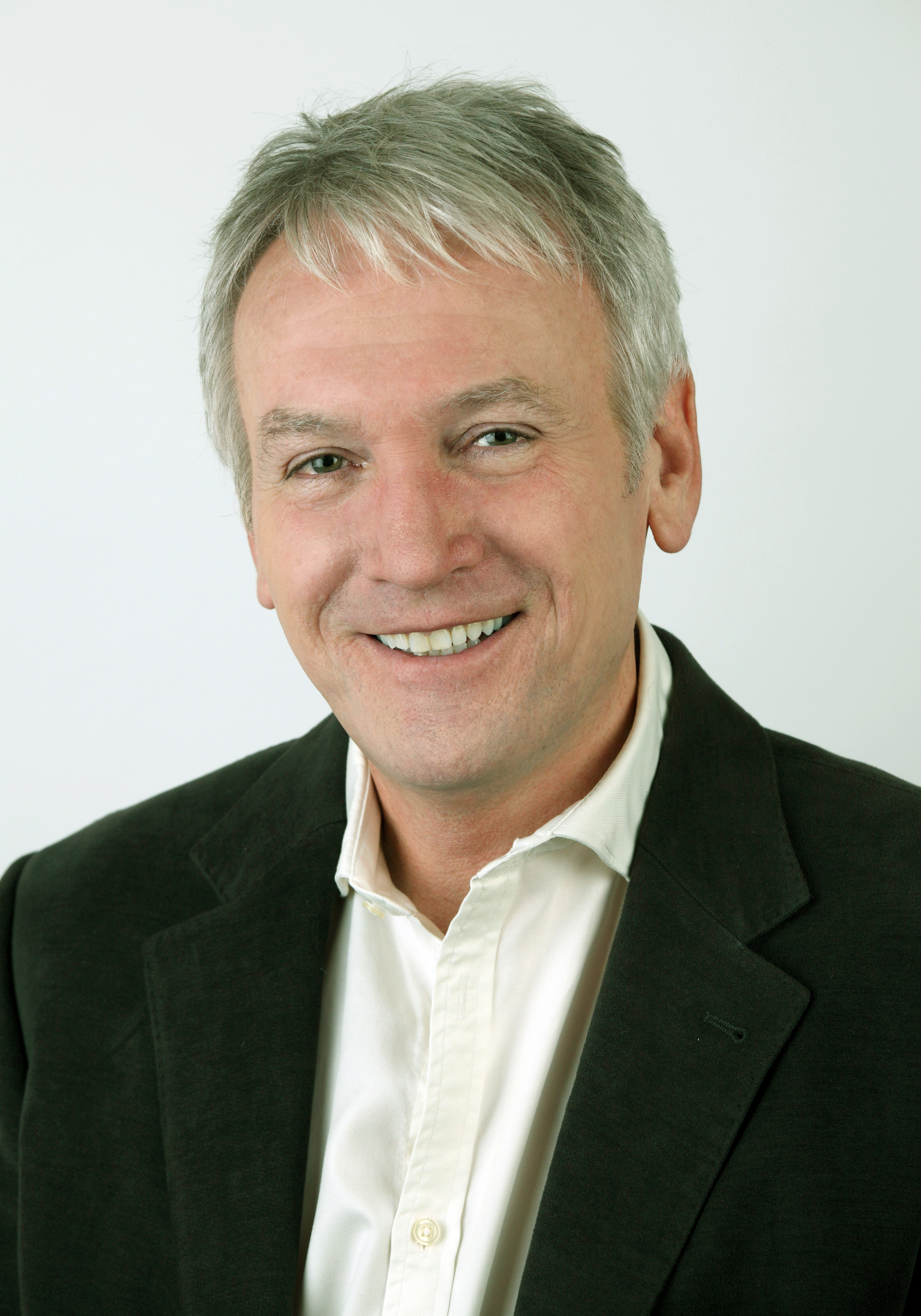
- Self-portrait photograph, 2010
- Born: 1952; Sydney, New South Wales, Australia
- Died: 11 September 2026 (aged 73); Sydney, New South Wales, Australia
- Education: St. Joseph's College, Hunters Hill; St Pius X College, Sydney
- Alma mater: Australian National University; Australian Graduate School of Management; Harvard Kennedy School
- Occupations: Broadcast journalist; Educator; Communications consultant
- Notable work: Talking Heads (2005–2010)

Peter Thompson (1952 – 11 September 2026) was an Australian broadcast journalist and educator. He was a fellow of the Australia and New Zealand School of Government and an adjunct professor at Macquarie University. He was director of the Centre for Leadership, a private consultancy on communication.

Thompson was the presenter of the Australian Broadcasting Corporation's Talking Heads, a weekly biographical television program about the lives of prominent Australians, which began on ABC1 in 2005 and ended in 2010 after 238 episodes.

== Early life and career ==
Peter Thompson was born in Sydney, New South Wales in 1952. He was educated at St Joseph's College, Hunters Hill and St Pius X College, Chatswood. Thompson graduated with a Bachelor of Arts degree from the Australian National University in 1977, a Masters of Business Administration from the Australian Graduate School of Management in 1984 and a Masters of Public Administration from the Harvard Kennedy School in 1987.

Thompson began his career as a sports broadcaster on radio at 2LF in Young, New South Wales, in 1970. He moved to Tasmania in 1972 and worked as a presenter on various commercial stations, including 7EX, 7LA and TNT-9. He also presented the ABC TV current affairs program This Day Tonight in 1978.

From 1979 to 1982, as project officer for the Australian Conservation Foundation, he was a leader of the effort to protect the world heritage values of Tasmania's Franklin and Gordon rivers from hydro-electric development. He wrote two books on the campaign. In 1985 he was presented with the University of New South Wales Alumni Award for his role in conservation.

He presented ABC Radio Sydney's Drivetime in 1987 and then the ABC morning current affairs program AM from 1988 to 1993. He was presenter of Radio National Breakfast from 1994 to 1999 and again from 2003 to 2004. He also hosted a series of 35 "Wisdom Interviews" for Radio National from 2002 to 2004.

Thompson was appointed a fellow of the Australia and New Zealand School of Government in 2007 and taught executive programs in public policy with a focus on communication concepts. His interests included political and social change, risk communication and behavioural change. He became an adjunct professor at Macquarie University's Department of International Communication in 2006.

The Centre for Leadership creates educational workshops for the public, private and not-for-profit sectors on public interest issues such as ethics and communicating with integrity, according to Aristotle's principles of ethos, pathos and logos.

== Personal life and death ==
Thompson died on 11 September 2026 at the age of 73.

== Publications ==
- Power in Tasmania, Australian Conservation Foundation, 1982.
- Bob Brown of the Franklin River, Allen and Unwin, 1985.
- The Secrets of the Great Communicators, ABC, 1992.
- Persuading Aristotle, Allen and Unwin, 2001.
- Wisdom: The Hard Won Gift, Interviews, ABC, 2003.
- Talking Heads, Interviews, ABC Books, 2008.
- More Talking Heads, Interviews, ABC Books, 2009.
