= Talking Heads (Australian TV series) =

- Presented by: Peter Thompson
- Country of origin: Australia
- Original language: English
- No. of series: 6
- No. of episodes: 238

Production
- Executive producer: Margot Phillipson
- Producers: Daniel Cooper; Jeremy Boylen; Geraldine McKenna; Stamatia Maroupas; Carolyn Jones; Matthew Lovering; Lincoln Tyner

Original release
- Network: ABC1
- Release: 25 March 2005 – 29 November 2010

Talking Heads was an Australian television series presented by Peter Thompson. It premiered on ABC1 in 2005 and aired for six series until its cancellation in 2010. The first three series were filmed at Brisbane Powerhouse in New Farm, Queensland; the series relocated to Adelaide in 2008.
