= Aliens (EP) =

EP by Mondo Rock
- Released: November 1987
- Recorded: Polygram Records
- Studio: Platinum Studios, Melbourne
- Genre: Rock
- Length: 20:49
- Label: Polydor Records
- Producer: Chris Corr, Mondo Rock

Mondo Rock chronology
Boom Baby Boom (1986)	Aliens (1987)	The Best of Dragon and Mondo Rock (1990)

Singles from Aliens
- 1. "Aliens (Walk Among Us)" Released: 1987

Aliens is the first EP by Australian rock band Mondo Rock, released in 1987. It peaked at number 66 on the Kent Music Report.

== Track listing ==
No.	Title	Writer(s)	Length
1.	"A Woman Like You"	Eric McCusker, John James Hackett, Ross Wilson	3:59
2.	"Aliens (Walk Among Us)"	Ross Wilson	4:09
3.	"I'm Free"	Mick Jagger, Keith Richards	3:35
4.	"Primitive Love Rites (L.A. Rhythm Mix)"	John James Hackett, Ross Wilson	4:53
5.	"Working My Way Back"	Andrew Ross, Eric McCusker, Ross Wilson	4:11
Total length:			20:49

=== Cassette track listing ===
A cassette was released featuring two additional tracks.

No.	Title	Length
6.	"Taxi Driver"
7.	"Boom Baby Boom" (New York Club Mix)

== Personnel ==
Mondo Rock:

- Ross Wilson – vocals, harmonica
- Eric McCusker – guitar, backing vocals
- Duncan Veall – keyboards, backing vocals
- Andrew Ross – keyboards, saxophone, backing vocals
- James Gilland – bass, backing vocals
- John James Hackett – drums, percussion, guitar, backing vocals

Production team:
For all tracks except "Boom Baby Boom" and "Primitive Love Rites":

- Producer – Mondo Rock and Chris Corr
- Mixed By – Mark Opitz with Chris Corr (tracks 1, 2, 3); Chris Corr with Ross Wilson (tracks 5, 6)

For "Boom Baby Boom" and "Primitive Love Rites":

- Producer, Engineer, Mixed in L.A. by – Bill Drescher

== Charts ==
Chart (1987/88)	Peak position
Australia (Kent Music Report)	66
