= Primal Park =

Studio album by Mondo Rock
- Released: October 1979
- Recorded: May 1979
- Studio: Bombay Rock, Melbourne
- Genre: Rock
- Length: 65:42
- Label: OZ Records
- Producer: Ross Wilson

Mondo Rock chronology
Primal Park (1979)	Chemistry (1981)

Singles from Primal Park
- 1. "Searching for My Baby" Released: September 1979; 2. "Primal Park" Released: November 1979

Primal Park is the debut studio album by Australian rock band Mondo Rock, released in October 1979 and peaked at number 40 on the Kent Music Report. The album is a mixture of live recordings (tracks 1, 6–9) and studio recordings (tracks 2–5). It spawned the non-charting singles "Searching for My Baby" and "Primal Park", both of which were studio recordings. In 2009, the album was remastered and included eight bonus tracks.

== Track listing ==
Side A

1. "Question Time" (Gunther Gorman) – 3:38
2. "Down to Earth" (Kim Fowley, Ross Wilson) – 4:06
3. "Primal Park" (David Pepperell, R. Wilson) – 4:15
4. "Searching for My Baby" (R. Wilson) – 2:52
5. "Tell Me" (Iain McLennan) – 4:21

Side B

1. "Toughen Up" (R. Wilson) – 3:45
2. "Down Down" Down Down (R. Wilson) – 4:29
3. "The Rebel" (R. Wilson, Tony Slavich) – 5:26
4. "Live Wire" – The Mondo Shakedown (R. Wilson, Simon Gyllies) – 6:56

2009 Bonus tracks – Singles A's And B's 1978/79

1. "The Fugitive Kind" (R. Wilson, T. Slavich) – 3:35
2. "The Breaking Point" (I. McLennan) – 4:57
3. "Send Me Someone" (R. Wilson) – 3:18
4. "Love Shock" (Peter Laffy, R. Wilson) – 3:10
5. "Don't You Lie to Me" (Chuck Berry) – 2:51
6. "Louie Louie" (Richard Berry) – 4:56
7. "Telephone Booth" (R. Wilson, Stephen Cummings) – 3:16
8. "Perhaps Perhaps" (R. Wilson, S. Cummings) – 3:11

== Personnel ==
Mondo Rock:

- Ross Wilson – lead vocals, harmonica
- Randy Bulpin – guitar, slide guitar
- Peter Laffy – guitar, backing vocals
- Rex Bullen – keyboards (tracks 2–5 only)
- Simon Gyllies – bass
- Iain McLennan – drums, backing vocals; lead vocals on "Tell Me"

also:

- Tony Slavich – keyboards (on bonus tracks 10, 11)
- Gil Matthews – drums (on bonus tracks 14–17)

with:

- Sunil De Silva – percussion
- Eddie Rayner – synthesizer
- Andrew Bell – additional vocals

Production team:

- Producer – Ross Wilson
- Engineers – Ern Rose and Jim Barton (tracks 1, 6–9: recorded live at Le Club Bombay Rock, Melbourne, 18 May 1979)
- Engineers – Mal Devenish, Richard Lush, Tony Cohen (tracks 2–5)
- Mixed by – Ross Cockle

== Charts ==
Chart (1979)	Peak position
Australia (Kent Music Report)	40
