= Good Advice (song) =

Single by Mondo Rock

from the album Up to the Moment
- Released: December 1984
- Studio: Paradise Studios, Sydney, Australia
- Genre: Pop rock
- Length: 3:43
- Label: Polydor Records
- Songwriter(s): Eric McCusker
- Producer(s): Mark Moffatt

Mondo Rock singles chronology
"The Modern Bop" (1984)	"Good Advice" (1984)	"The Moment" (1985)

"Good Advice" is a song by Australian rock band Mondo Rock, released in December 1984 as the lead single from the band's first greatest hits album Up to the Moment (1985). It was written by the band's guitarist Eric McCusker. The single peaked at number 56 on the Kent Music Report. "Good Advice" had been previously recorded by Deborah Conway for TV drama, music series Sweet and Sour (1984) in episode 12. Her version also appeared on the related soundtrack album, Sweet and Sour Volume Two – TV Soundtrack (1984), which was re-issued with Volume One as Sweet and Sour Soundtrack on CD in 2010.

== Track listings ==
Aus 7" Single

1. "Good Advice" - 3:43
2. "Dark Secrets"

== Charts ==
Chart (1985)	Peak position
Australia (Kent Music Report)	56
