= The Fugitive Kind (song) =

Single by Mondo Rock
- Released: 4 September 1978
- Genre: Rock
- Length: 3:33
- Label: Oz Records
- Songwriter(s): Ross Wilson, Tony Slavich
- Producer(s): Ross Wilson

Mondo Rock singles chronology
"The Fugitive Kind" (1978)	"Love Shock" (1979)

"The Fugitive Kind" is the debut single by Australian rock band Mondo Rock. It was released in September 1978. It peaked at number 49 on the Kent Music Report. The song appears as a bonus track for Mondo Rock's debut studio album Primal Park.

== Reception ==
Dennis Atkins in RAM said, "It's got an infectious hook line and some fancy pop riffs, especially from Slavich's piano."

== Track listing ==
1. "The Fugitive Kind" (Ross Wilson, Tony Slavich) - 3:47
2. "The Breaking Point" (Iain McLennan) - 4:57

== Charts ==
Chart (1978)	Peak position
Australia (Kent Music Report)	49
