= In Another Love =

Single by Mondo Rock

from the album Nuovo Mondo
- Released: March 1983
- Length: 3:57
- Label: WEA
- Songwriter(s): Eric McCusker
- Producer(s): Peter Mclan

Mondo Rock singles chronology
"The Queen and Me" (1982)	"In Another Love" (1983)	"Come Said the Boy" (1983)

"In Another Love" is a song by Australian rock band Mondo Rock, released in March 1983 as the third and final single from the band's third studio album Nuovo Mondo (1982). It peaked at number 86 on the Kent Music Report.

== Track listing ==
1. "In Another Love" - 3:57
2. "Is It Any Wonder?"

== Charts ==
Chart (1983)	Peak position
Australia (Kent Music Report)	86
