= Baby Wants to Rock =

Single by Mondo Rock

from the album The Modern Bop
- Released: March 1984
- Studio: Fast Forward Studios
- Genre: Rock
- Length: 4:29
- Label: WEA
- Songwriter(s): James Black, Ross Wilson
- Producer(s): John Sayers, Mondo Rock

Mondo Rock singles chronology
"Come Said the Boy" (1983)	"Baby Wants to Rock" (1984)	"The Modern Bop" (1984)

"Baby Wants to Rock" is a song by Australian rock band Mondo Rock, released in March 1984 as the second single from the band's fourth studio album The Modern Bop (1984). The song peaked at number 18 on the Kent Music Report.

== Track listings ==
Aus 7" Single

1. "Baby Wants to Rock" - 4:29
2. "Winds Light to Variable" - 4:14

== Charts ==
Chart (1984)	Peak position
Australia (Kent Music Report)	18
