= Boom Baby Boom =

Studio album by Mondo Rock
- Released: September 1986
- Studio: Platinum Studios, Melbourne
- Genre: Rock
- Length: 42:03
- Label: Polydor Records
- Producer: Bill Drescher

Mondo Rock chronology
Up to the Moment (1985)	Boom Baby Boom (1986)	Aliens (1987)

Singles from Boom Baby Boom
- 1. "Rule of Threes" Released: August 1986; 2. "Primitive Love Rites" Released: October 1986; 3. "Boom Baby Boom" Released: April 1987

Boom Baby Boom is the fifth studio album by Australian rock band Mondo Rock, released in September 1986. It peaked at number 27 on the Kent Music Report.

== Reception ==
Cash Box magazine called the album a "clever, dance-rock outing full of potential singles. Enough quirky, progressive elements to interest modern-leaning musos; enough pop craftsmanship and crisp song writing to catch traditionalists."

== Track listing ==
Side A
No.	Title	Writer(s)	Length
1.	"Primitive Love Rites"	John James Hackett, Ross Wilson	4:50
2.	"Boom Baby Boom"	Eric McCusker, John James Hackett, Ross Wilson	5:16
3.	"Rule of Threes"	Eric McCusker	4:04
4.	"Get to You"	Eric McCusker	4:26
5.	"Our Time"	Eric McCusker	4:20

Side B
No.	Title	Writer(s)	Length
1.	"Rise And Fall"	Eric McCusker	4:16
2.	"Do It Yourself (Health And Happiness)"	Andrew Ross, Duncan Veall, Eric McCusker, James Gillard, John James Hackett	4:33
3.	"Roman Holiday"	Eric McCusker	3:15
4.	"Let It Rain"	Eric McCusker	5:20
5.	"Under Lights"	Eric McCusker	4:03

== Personnel ==
Mondo Rock:

- Ross Wilson – vocals, harmonica
- Eric McCusker – guitar, backing vocals
- Duncan Veall – keyboards, backing vocals
- Andrew Ross – keyboards, saxophone, backing vocals
- James Gillard – bass, backing vocals
- John James Hackett – drums, percussion, guitar, backing vocals

with:

- Alex Pertout – percussion
- Bruce Allen – second saxophone on "Rule of Threes" and "Roman Holiday"
- Greg Thorne – trumpet on "Rule of Threes"
- Bob Venier – flugelhorn
- Angus Davidson, Pat Wilson, Ross Hannaford, Venetta Fields – backing vocals

Production team:

- Producer, Engineer, Mixed by – Bill Drescher
- Assistant Engineers – Angus Davidson (recording), Charlie Brocco (mixing)

== Charts ==
Chart (1986)	Peak position
Australia (Kent Music Report)	27
