= Why Fight It? =

Studio album by Mondo Rock
- Released: December 1990
- Genres: Rock, pop rock
- Labels: Wheatley Records, BMG Records
- Producer: Waddy Wachtel

Mondo Rock chronology
The Best of Dragon and Mondo Rock (1990)	Why Fight It? (1990)	The Essential Mondo Rock (2003)

Singles from Why Fight It?
- 1. "Why Fight It?" Released: August 1990; 2. "I Had You in Mind" Released: February 1991; 3. "Soul Reason" Released: May 1991

Why Fight It? is the sixth and final studio album by Australian rock band Mondo Rock, released in December 1990. The album includes former Beach Boys drummer Ricky Fataar and American guitarist Waddy Wachtel. The album peaked at number 102 in April 1991.

== Track listing ==
No.	Title	Writer(s)	Length
1.	"I Had You In Mind"	Eric McCusker, J. Van Tongeren, C. Leiberman	4:19
2.	"Why Fight It"	Ross Wilson, McCusker	4:58
3.	"Keep the Motor Running"	McCusker, Van Tongeren, Leiberman, Wilson	4:10
4.	"Soul Reason"	McCusker, Bogdanova	4:28
5.	"There Will Be Some Changes"	Wilson, Duncan Veall	4:09
6.	"Once You Get Me Started"	McCusker, James Gillard	4:29
7.	"Love Sucks You In"	McCusker, Gierman, McGraw, Myers	4:14
8.	"Winter Sky"	McCusker	4:06
9.	"You Got It Coming"	Wilson, McCusker	4:14
10.	"Things Are Hotting Up"	John James Hackett, McCusker, Wilson	4:52

== Personnel ==
Mondo Rock:

- Ross Wilson – vocals, harmonica
- Eric McCusker – guitar, keyboards, backing vocals

with:

- Waddy Wachtel – guitar, percussion, backing vocals
- Bernie Worrell – organ, clavinet, synthesizer
- Colin "Polly" Newham – keyboards and programming (tracks 1, 2, 5)
- Ian Belton – bass
- Ricky Fataar – drums, backing vocals
- Kipp Lennon, Mark Lennon, Michael Lennon – backing vocals (tracks 1, 4, 5)
- Mark Williams, Mary Azzopardi – backing vocals (tracks 2, 3, 9, 10)

Production team:

- Producer – Waddy Wachtel
- Engineers – Andrew Scott, Shep Lonsdale
- Mixed by – Shep Lonsdale

== Charts ==
Chart (1990/1991)	Peak position
Australian Albums (ARIA Charts)	102
