= Primitive Love Rites =

Single by Mondo Rock

from the album Boom Baby Boom
- Released: October 1986
- Studio: Platinum Studios, Melbourne, Australia
- Genre: Pop rock
- Length: 4:50
- Label: Polydor Records
- Songwriter(s): Ross Wilson, John James Hackett
- Producer(s): Bill Drescher

Mondo Rock singles chronology
"Rule of Threes" (1986)	"Primitive Love Rites" (1986)	"Boom Baby Boom" (1987)

"Primitive Love Rites" is a song by Australian rock band Mondo Rock, released in October 1986 as the second single from the band's fifth studio album Boom Baby Boom (1986). The song peaked at number 34 on the Kent Music Report. The song became the band's only song to peak within the Billboard Hot 100, at 71. In New Zealand the song peaked at number 40 on Recorded Music NZ.

== Track listings ==
Aus 7" Single

No.	Title	Writer(s)	Length
1.	"Primitive Love Rites"	Ross Wilson, John James Hackett	4:50
2.	"Under Lights"	Eric McCusker	4:02

Aus 12" Single

No.	Title	Writer(s)	Length
1.	"Primitive Love Rites (Extended Mix) "	Ross Wilson, John James Hackett	6:04
2.	"Rule Of Threes (Extended Version) "	Eric McCusker	7:05

International 12" single

No.	Title	Writer(s)	Length
1.	"Primitive Love Rites (U.S. Remix) "	Ross Wilson, John James Hackett	4:54
2.	"Under Lights"	Eric McCusker	4:02
3.	"Primitive Love Rites (Original Australian Extended Mix)"	Ross Wilson, John James Hackett	6:04

== Charts ==
Chart (1986/87)	Peak position
Australia (Kent Music Report)	34
New Zealand (Recorded Music NZ)	40
Billboard Hot 100	71
Billboard Mainstream Rock	31

== Personnel ==
- Ross Wilson – vocals, guitar, harmonica (1976–1991)
- John James Hackett – drums, percussion, guitar (1981–1990)
- James Gillard – bass guitar (1982–1990)
- Andrew Ross – saxophone, keyboards (1986–1990)
- Eric McCusker – guitar, keyboards (1980–1991)
- Duncan Veall – keyboards (1984–1990)
