= Nuovo Mondo =

Studio album by Mondo Rock
- Released: July 1982
- Recorded: RCA, Warner Music Group
- Genre: Rock
- Length: 37:02
- Label: RCA, Warner Music Group
- Producer: Peter McIan

Mondo Rock chronology
Chemistry (1981)	Nuovo Mondo (1982)	The Modern Bop (1984)

Singles from Nuovo Mondo
- 1. "No Time" Released: June 1982; 2. "The Queen and Me" Released: September 1982; 3. "In Another Love" Released: February 1983

Nuovo Mondo is the third studio album by Australian rock band Mondo Rock, released in July 1982. It was released through WEA Records and reached number 7 on the Kent Music Report.

== Track listing ==
Side A
No.	Title	Writer(s)	Length
1.	"No Time"	Eric McCusker	4:03
2.	"Up And Down"	Eric McCusker	2:51
3.	"The Queen and Me"	Eric McCusker	3:21
4.	"Mondomania"	Ross Wilson	3:38
5.	"A Touch of Paradise"	Gulliver Smith, Ross Wilson	4:07

Side B
No.	Title	Writer(s)	Length
1.	"Out The Window"	Eric McCusker	4:05
2.	"In Another Love"	Eric McCusker	3:48
3.	"Domination"	James Black, Paul Christie, Ross Wilson	4:25
4.	"When Men And Women Come Out To Play"	Eric McCusker	3:00
5.	"Is It Any Wonder?"	James Black	5:04

== Personnel ==
Mondo Rock:

- Ross Wilson – vocals
- Eric McCusker – guitar, backing vocals
- James Black – keyboards, guitar, bass, backing vocals
- Paul Christie – bass, backing vocals
- John James Hackett – drums

Production team:

- Producer, Engineer – Peter McIan
- Additional Engineers – Jim Barton, Jim Barbour
- Remixed by – Peter McIan, Paul Ray

== Charts ==
Chart (1982)	Peak position
Australia (Kent Music Report)	7
