= No Time (Mondo Rock song) =

Song by Australian rock band Mondo Rock

Single by Mondo Rock

from the album Nuovo Mondo
- Released: June 1982
- Genre: Rock
- Length: 4:03
- Label: WEA
- Songwriter(s): Eric McCusker
- Producer(s): Peter Mclan

Mondo Rock singles chronology
"Summer of '81" (1981)	"No Time" (1982)	"The Queen and Me" (1982)

"No Time" is a song by Australian rock band Mondo Rock, released in June 1982 as the lead single from the band's third album Nuovo Mondo. It peaked at number 11 on the Kent Music Report.

According to Eric McCusker the song was inspired by The Beatles' "Don't Let Me Down", as a tribute to John Lennon.

== Track listing ==
1. "No Time" (Eric McCusker) - 4:03
2. "Il Mondo Caffe" (James Black, Ross Wilson) - 2:48

== Charts ==
Chart (1982)	Peak position
Australia (Kent Music Report)	11
