= The Queen and Me =

"The Queen And Me"

Single by Mondo Rock

from the album Nuovo Mondo
- Released: September 1982
- Genre: Rock
- Length: 3:21
- Label: WEA
- Songwriter(s): Eric McCusker
- Producer(s): Peter Mclan

Mondo Rock singles chronology
"No Time" (1982)	"The Queen And Me" (1982)	"In Another Love" (1983)

"The Queen and Me" is a song by Australian rock band Mondo Rock, released in September 1982 as the second single from the band's third studio album Nuovo Mondo (1982). It peaked at number 40 on the Kent Music Report.

== Track listing ==
1. "The Queen and Me" (Eric McCusker) - 3:21
2. "Domination" (Ross Wilson, James Black, Paul Christie) - 4:25

== Charts ==
Chart (1982)	Peak position
Australia (Kent Music Report)	40
