= Chemistry (Mondo Rock album) =

- Original 1981 cover

Studio album by Mondo Rock
- Released: 10 July 1981
- Recorded: 1980
- Studios: AAV Studios, Melbourne/Festival Records, Sydney
- Genre: Rock
- Length: 61:56
- Labels: Avenue Records, Atlantic
- Producer: Mark Moffatt

Mondo Rock chronology
Primal Park (1979)	Chemistry (1981)	Nuovo Mondo (1982)

Singles from Chemistry
- 1. "State of the Heart" Released: October 1980; 2. "Cool World" Released: March 1981; 3. "Chemistry" Released: July 1981; 4. "Summer of '81" Released: October 1981

Chemistry is the second studio album by Australian rock band Mondo Rock, produced by Mark Moffatt, and released in July 1981. It was released in the US in January 1982 on Atlantic Records. The album was certified 2× Platinum in Australia.

At the 1981 Countdown Australian Music Awards the album won Best Australian Album.

In 2014, the album was remastered and reissued with two bonus tracks, previously unreleased demos and came with a second disc of live tracks.

== Reception ==
On its US release, Billboard described it as "state of the art rock that can be played on a variety of formats". In 2014, Cream Magazine described it as "one of the better albums of its year of release".

== Chart performance and singles ==
Chemistry peaked at number 3 in Australia during a 33-week run beginning in July 1981. It was released through the Avenue Records label. State Of The Heart first charted on November 17, 1980, peaked at 6th position and stayed in the charts for 26 weeks. Mondo Rock released the single "Cool World" in 1981. It was released through the Avenue Records label. Cool World first charted on April 13, 1981, peaked at 8th position and stayed in the charts for 20 weeks. Mondo Rock released the single "Summer Of '81" in 1981. "Summer Of '81" first charted on November 16, 1981, peaked at 31st position and stayed in the charts for 17 weeks. Their second album, Chemistry was issued in July 1981, which peaked at No. 2 on the Australian Kent Music Report Albums Chart. Mondo Rock reached the top 10 on the related Kent Music Report Singles Chart with "State of the Heart" (October 1980) and "Cool World" (April 1981).

== 2014 live shows ==
In 2014 the band reformed to play the album live on its 33 1/3 anniversary.

== Track listing ==
Side A
No.	Title	Writer(s)	Length
1.	"Chemistry"	Eric McCusker, Paul Christie	4:20
2.	"Trash"	Ross Wilson, Simon Gyllies	3:13
3.	"The Popular View"	Eric McCusker	3:36
4.	"State of the Heart"	Eric McCusker	4:14
5.	"Moves"	Eric McCusker	3:44

Side B
No.	Title	Writer(s)	Length
1.	"Step Up, Step Out"	Eric McCusker	3:23
2.	"Summer of '81"	Eric McCusker	3:50
3.	"Cool World"	Ross Wilson	3:30
4.	"Mondo Sexo"	Ross Wilson	2:57
5.	"We're No Angels"	Ross Wilson	5:28

=== Bonus tracks (Single B-sides) ===
No.	Title	Writer(s)	Length
11.	"Mona Lisa"	Eric McCusker	3:54
12.	"Back On The Outside"	Eric McCusker, Ross Wilson	2:31

=== Previously unreleased demos ===
No.	Title	Writer(s)	Length
13.	"Step Up, Step Out"	Eric McCusker	4:03
14.	"Photographica"	Eric McCusker	3:27
15.	"We're No Angels"	Ross Wilson	5:37
16.	"The Popular View"	Eric McCusker	3:47

=== Disc 2 (Live) ===
No.	Title	Writer(s)	Length
1.	"Chemistry (Live)"	Eric McCusker, Paul Christie	5:18
2.	"Summer Of '81 (Live)"	Eric McCusker	4:36
3.	"Slice Of Life (Live)"	Eric McCusker	3:56
4.	"Tied Up In Knots (Live)"	Eric McCusker	4:49
5.	"Modified TV Version (Live)"	Eric McCusker	3:54
6.	"Crimes Of Passion (Live)"	Eric McCusker, Ross Wilson	5:19
7.	"It's Money That I Love (Live)"	Randy Newman	3:48
8.	"The Bop Is Back (Live)"	Ross Wilson	4:30
9.	"Getting Even (Live)"	Eric McCusker	4:13
10.	"Mondo Sexo (Live)"	Ross Wilson	3:11
11.	"Louie Louie/Do The Boomerang (Live)"	Richard Berry/Junior Walker, Willie Woods, Henry Cosby	10:00
12.	"Living In The Land Of Oz (Live)"	Ross Wilson	4:56
13.	"Searching For My Baby (Live)"	Ross Wilson	4:37

Note

- International releases swap Side A and Side B of the record.

== Personnel ==
Mondo Rock:

- Ross Wilson – vocals
- Eric McCusker – guitar, backing vocals
- James Black – keyboards, backing vocals
- Paul Christie – bass, backing vocals
- John James Hackett – drums (on "We're No Angels" only)

According to the original liner notes, "these quasi-members also played drums"

- Andrew Buchanan (tracks 3, 8, 12)
- Gil Matthews (tracks 4, 9, 11, 13, 14, 15, 16)
- Graham "Buzz" Bidstrup (1, 2, 5, 6, 7)

On the live tracks on CD 2, the drummers are:

- John James Hackett (1, 2, 3, 4, 12, 13)
- Gil Matthews (tracks 5–11)

Production team:
Original album (except "State Of The Heart") + "Back On The Outside"

- Producer, Engineer – Mark Moffatt
- Engineers – Jim Barton, Ross Cockle, Scott Hemming

"State Of The Heart" + "Mona Lisa"

- Producer, Engineer – Ern Rose
- Re-mix Engineer ("State Of The Heart") – Gil Matthews

Previously Unreleased Demos

- Engineer, Mixed by – Gil Matthews

Live tracks

- Producer – Jim Barton and Mondo Rock
- Engineers – Jim Barton, Keith Walker

== Charts ==
=== Weekly charts ===
Chart (1981/82)	Peak position
Australia (Kent Music Report)	3

=== Year-end charts ===
Chart (1981)	Peak position
Australia (Kent Music Report)	24
