= The Modern Bop =

Studio album by Mondo Rock
- Released: March 1984
- Studio: Music Farm Studios, AAV, Fast Forward Studios
- Genre: Rock
- Length: 43:32
- Label: Polydor
- Producer: John Sayers

Mondo Rock chronology
Nuovo Mondo (1982)	The Modern Bop (1984)	Up to the Moment (1985)

Singles from The Modern Bop
- 1. "Come Said the Boy" Released: November 1983; 2. "Baby Wants to Rock" Released: March 1984; 3. "The Modern Bop" Released: July 1984

The Modern Bop is the fourth studio album by Australian rock band Mondo Rock, released in March 1984 and peaked at number 5 on the Kent Music Report.

Rolling Stone stated: “The album achieves the Mondo’s oft-quoted aim: ‘adult’ music that isn't soft or easy-listening.”

== Track listing ==
Side A
No.	Title	Writer(s)	Length
1.	"Lovers Of The World"	Eric McCusker	3:32
2.	"Come Said the Boy"	Eric McCusker	5:17
3.	"Happy Families"	Ross Wilson	3:03
4.	"The Modern Bop"	Ross Wilson	5:18
5.	"Take Me Away"	Eric McCusker, J. J. Hackett	4:04

Side B
No.	Title	Writer(s)	Length
1.	"Baby Wants to Rock"	James Black, Ross Wilson	5:20
2.	"Flight 28"	Eric McCusker	4:54
3.	"Marina"	Eric McCusker	4:37
4.	"Cost Of Living"	Eric McCusker, J. J. Hackett, James Black, James Gillard, Ross Wilson	3:40
5.	"In My House"	Eric McCusker	3:47

== Personnel ==
Mondo Rock:

- Ross Wilson – vocals, guitar, harmonica
- Eric McCusker – guitar, backing vocals
- James Black – keyboards, guitar, backing vocals
- James Gillard – bass, backing vocals
- John James Hackett – drums

with:

- Joe Camilleri – saxophone on "Flight 28"

Production team:

- Producer – John Sayers, Mondo Rock
- Engineers – John Sayers, John French, Ross Cockle
- Assistant Engineers – Doug Brady, Gary Constable
- Mixed by – John Sayers

== Charts ==
Chart (1984)	Peak position
Australia (Kent Music Report)	5
