= The Modern Bop (song) =

Single by Mondo Rock

from the album The Modern Bop
- Released: July 1984
- Studio: Fast Forward Studios
- Genre: Pop rock
- Length: 3:45
- Label: Polydor Records; WEA
- Songwriter(s): Ross Wilson
- Producer(s): John Sayers, Mondo Rock

Mondo Rock singles chronology
"Baby Wants to Rock" (1984)	"The Modern Bop" (1984)	"Good Advice" (1984)

"The Modern Bop" is a song by Australian rock band Mondo Rock, released in July 1984 as the third and final single from the band's fourth studio album The Modern Bop (1984). The song peaked at number 85 on the Kent Music Report.

== Track listings ==
Aus 7" Single

1. "The Modern Bop" - 3:45
2. "Cost of Living" - 3:40

Aus 12" Single

1. "The Modern Bop" (New York remix) - 6:53
2. "The Modern Bop" (Instrumental) - 5:48
3. "Winds - Light to Variable" - 4:14

== Charts ==
Chart (1984)	Peak position
Australia (Kent Music Report)	85
