= Cool World (song) =

- AUS single

Single by Mondo Rock

from the album Chemistry
- Released: March 1981
- Recorded: 1980
- Genre: Rock, new wave
- Length: 3:33
- Label: Avenue Records (AUS), WEA (NZ), Atlantic Records (UK)
- Songwriter(s): Ross Wilson
- Producer(s): Mark Moffatt

Mondo Rock singles chronology
"State of the Heart" (1980)	"Cool World" (1981)	"Chemistry" (1981)

"Cool World" is a song by Australian rock band Mondo Rock, released in March 1981 as the second single released from the band's second studio album Chemistry (1981). The song became the band's second top ten single, peaking at number 8 on the Kent Music Report. The song was written by Mondo Rock's lead vocalist Ross Wilson.

At the 1981 Countdown Music Awards, the song was nominated for Best Australian Single.

== Track listing ==
AUS 7" Single

No.	Title	Writer(s)	Length
1.	"Cool World"	Ross Wilson	3:34
2.	"Back On The Outside"	Ross Wilson, Eric McCusker	2:31

UK 7" Single

No.	Title	Writer(s)	Length
1.	"Cool World"	Ross Wilson	3:34
2.	"Step Up, Step Out"	Eric McCusker	3:23

== Charts ==
=== Weekly charts ===
Chart (1981)	Peak position
Australia (Kent Music Report)	8

=== Year-end charts ===
Chart (1981)	Position
Australian (Kent Music Report)	43
