= Ross Wilson (musician) =

Australian singer and songwriter (born 1947)

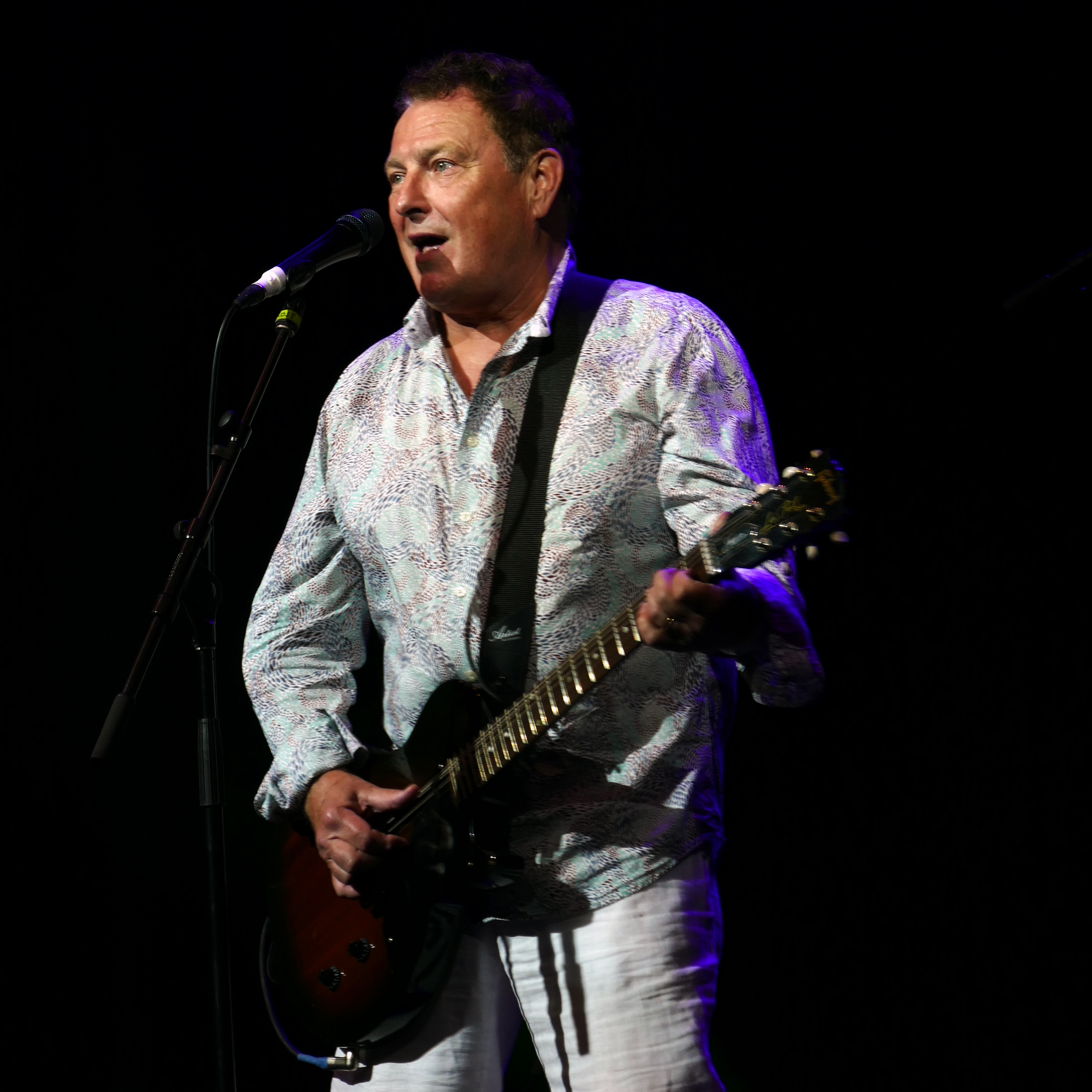
- Wilson performing in 2018

Background information
- Also known as: Duke Wilson
- Born: Ross Andrew Wilson; 18 November 1947 (age 79); Melbourne, Victoria, Australia
- Genres: Rock and roll, progressive rock
- Occupations: Singer-songwriter; musician; producer
- Instruments: Vocals, guitar, harmonica
- Years active: 1964–present
- Labels: Sparmac; Wizard; Sony BMG; Liberation; Shock
- Formerly of: Daddy Cool; Mondo Rock; Pat Wilson; Jo Jo Zep & the Falcons; The Pink Finks; Sons of the Vegetal Mother; Mighty Kong; The Johnnys; The Party Machine
- Website: Official website

Ross Andrew Wilson (born 18 November 1947) is an Australian singer-songwriter, musician and producer. He is the co-founder and frontman of the long-standing rock groups Daddy Cool and Mondo Rock, as well as a number of other former bands, in addition to performing solo. He has produced records for bands such as Skyhooks and Jo Jo Zep & the Falcons, as well as for those of his own bands. He appeared as a judge on celebrity singing TV series It Takes Two from 2005. Wilson was individually inducted into the Australian Recording Industry Association (ARIA) Hall of Fame in 1989 and again as a member of Daddy Cool in 2006. Ross currently resides in the Melbourne suburb of Port Melbourne.

== Early life ==
Wilson's father was an amateur jazz musician and his mother would play classical music on the piano at their home in the Melbourne suburb of Hampton. Wilson learnt to sing harmonies with the local Anglican church choir and was selected as a boy soprano wedding singer. In 1958, at ten and a half years old, he and his father attended their first rock & roll show featuring Johnny O'Keefe, Jerry Lee Lewis and Buddy Holly and the Crickets. A car accident in 1963 caused severe injuries. During recovery over subsequent months, Wilson took up harmonica playing and would copy from records to develop his playing style.

== Career ==
=== Early career ===
Wilson began his musical career in 1964 and formed his first band The Pink Finks with thirteen-year-old Ross Hannaford (guitar and vocals), who would become his long-time musical partner, whilst both were still at school. They released a cover version of "Louie Louie" as a single in 1965 on their own label, Mojo, and followed with three more singles after being signed to local label W & G. At about this time he met Patricia Higgins (future Pat Wilson) whilst working at the Department of Supply. The Pink Finks was followed by the more progressively oriented The Party Machine (1967–69) still with Hannaford, but included Mike Rudd on bass (later in Spectrum). Compensation for his earlier car accident was received by 1969, which enabled Wilson to travel to England with Pat. He had been invited by Brian Peacock (bass guitar) to join his band Procession. Whilst there, Wilson married Pat, recorded an album Procession with the band and began to work on the song "Eagle Rock". Wilson returned to Australia later that year and formed Sons of the Vegetal Mother (1969–70), again including Hannaford and Rudd, a group inspired by the work of Frank Zappa.

=== 1970–1976: Daddy Cool and producing Skyhooks ===
In 1970 Sons of the Vegetal Mother formed a side-project called Daddy Cool. The original members were Wilson, Hannaford (vocals and guitars), Gary Young (drums, vocals) and Wayne Duncan (bass, vocals), other members that joined, included saxophonist Jeremy Noone and guitarist Ian Winter.

Known for their "good time" image, Daddy Cool's repertoire mixed covers of 1950s R&B and doo-wop classics with original compositions mostly written by Wilson. The band signed to the independent Sparmac label, co-owned by producer and former child prodigy guitarist Robie Porter. Daddy Cool became very popular in Australia and their records also gained a following in the US and Canada in the early 1970s. They scored a nationwide No. 1 hit in Australia in mid-1971 with the single "Eagle Rock" and their debut LP, Daddy Who? Daddy Cool, also reached No. 1 to set a record as the biggest selling Australian album to that time. The "Eagle Rock" promo was directed by Chris Löfvén who had earlier that year directed the video for Spectrum's single "I'll Be Gone".

Around this time Ross and wife Pat both appeared naked in a short film directed by Chris Löfvén titled "The Beginning" which is an extra on the DVD release of Oz.

After Daddy Cool broke up late in 1972, Wilson and Hannaford formed the short-lived Mighty Kong which included former Spectrum drummer Ray Arnott and Company Caine guitarist Russell Smith. They recorded only one LP, All I Wanna Do Is Rock released on Porter's new label Wizard Records, but the band broke up soon after. Whilst performing with Mighty Kong, Wilson was impressed by a fledgling Melbourne band called Skyhooks and signed their main songwriter Greg Macainsh to his publishing company.

Daddy Cool made a surprise reformation for the January 1974 Sunbury Pop Festival and remained together until late 1975. Also performing at Sunbury in 1974 were Skyhooks and, despite their being booed off stage, Wilson recommended the band to Mushroom Records boss Michael Gudinski. In June / July 1974 Wilson took time off from Daddy Cool and produced Skyhooks’ breakthrough debut album Living in the Seventies, which overtook Daddy Cool's first album to become the biggest-selling Australian LP. He went on to produce their next two albums, Ego is not a Dirty Word (1975) and Straight in a Gay Gay World (1976), both of which were also successes in Australia.

=== 1976–1991: Mondo Rock and solo ===
Contractual problems with Porter's Wizard label, to whom Wilson was signed at the time, forced him to wait out the end of his recording contract. He turned to producing records for Skyhooks on Mushroom Records and Company Caine on his own label Oz Records. When his contractual obligations ended, Wilson also scored Chris Löfvén's 1976 film, Oz, inspired by The Wizard of Oz but set in Australia. Wilson performed "Livin' in the Land of Oz" (also released as a single), "The Mood", "Greaseball", "Who's Gonna Love You Tonight" and "Atmospherics", with fellow ex-Daddy Cool members Gary Young and Wayne Burt; he produced the soundtrack which also featured the film's stars Joy Dunstan and Graham Matters singing a track each and two tracks by Jo Jo Zep & The Falcons. Jo Jo Zep, containing Young and Burt, were also signed to Oz Records and released the single "Beating Around the Bush" from the soundtrack.

To promote his single, Wilson formed Mondo Rock:

My longest lasting project, Mondo Rock (76–90) started as an occasional thing to help promote my 1st solo single "Living in the Land of Oz" & it wasn't until 1978 that we issued our debut single

— Ross Wilson, 2001

Mondo Rock went through several incarnations but the best known line-up included bassist Paul Christie (ex-Kevin Borich Express, later in The Party Boys), guitarist and songwriter Eric McCusker, (ex-The Captain Matchbox Whoopee Band), drummer John Hackett (ex-Stars) and James Black on keyboards and guitar. Wilson also produced the band's first single in 1978 "The Fugitive Kind" and first album, 1979's Primal Park for his own Oz Records label. Greatest singles success was with 1980's "State of the Heart", 1981's "Chemistry" and "Cool World" all from their award-winning second album Chemistry released in 1981 on Avenue Records. 1980s teen-idol Rick Springfield recorded "State of the Heart" in 1985, making the U.S. Top 40. McCusker had written "State of the Heart", co-written "Chemistry" with Christie, and Wilson had written "Cool World". Mondo Rock released Nuovo Mondo in 1982 which included their track "A Touch of Paradise" written by Wilson and Gulliver Smith (aka Kevin Smith, ex-Company Caine). This became a 1986 hit when covered by Australian pop singer John Farnham (ex-Little River Band).

In 1983, Wilson's then wife Pat recorded and released, "Bop Girl" a song written by Ross. The song featured Ross on backing vocals, and became an Australian No. 2 hit and gained recognition internationally. It also had a video directed by Gillian Armstrong, which featured not only Ross, but the screen debut of Nicole Kidman.

Mondo Rock released further albums including The Modern Bop in 1984, which had their best charting single "Come Said the Boy" (#2 on National singles chart) and "The Modern Bop"; and Boom Baby Boom in 1986, Aliens (EP) in 1987 and Why Fight It? in 1990. The later albums and singles had little chart success. Wilson's most successful solo release was 1989's "Bed of Nails" which reached No. 25 on the National singles charts. It was released from his July 1989 solo album Dark Side of the Man on WEA.

=== 1990s and beyond ===
Wilson returned to performing in the late 1990s and he has released two albums of new material plus a two-CD retrospective covering his entire career, including many rare tracks. He has also collaborated with children's group The Wiggles, singing on their re-recording of "Eagle Rock" and playing the part of "King Mondo" in the video "Space Dancing". Wilson also appeared as "King Mondo" on the 2004 video "Santa's Rockin'!" singing This Little Baby Is Born Again.

In 1996 Wilson was part of the pre-game entertainment at the ARL Grand Final at the Sydney Football Stadium, with other famous Australian music acts, The Del Tones, Glenn Shorrock, Christine Anu and Kate Ceberano. Wilson sang "Eagle Rock", which was later adopted by the winners of the Grand Final, the Manly-Warringah Sea Eagles, as their team anthem. At the Gimme Ted benefit concert on 9 March 2001 Wilson performed four songs.

Ross Wilson has appeared as a judge on the Seven Network celebrity reality singing competition It Takes Two in both 2006 and 2007 series, and was featured in the ABC interview series Talking Heads with Peter Thompson on 9 July 2007.

In August 2009, Wilson celebrated 45 years in music with the commemorative "5 Decades of Cool" concert at the Palais Theatre, St Kilda, Melbourne.

Wilson made a celebrity guest appearance on Neighbours in 2018.

On 9 June 2023, Wilson released the 4-track She's Stuck On Facebook All the Time EP, the first new music in 13 years.

== Personal life ==
Wilson has a brother, Bruce Wilson, who designed the logo for the Mojo Label under which The Pink Finks released "Louie Louie", Bruce also designed the logo for The Party Machine, and printed their "obscene and seditious" songbook. Ross Wilson's first wife, Pat Wilson, was a journalist and, briefly, a pop star with "Bop Girl" (written by Ross) in 1983 and reached No. 2. On the promo video for "Eagle Rock" a pregnant Pat Wilson is in the front row of the concert footage. Their only child together, a son, was born later that year. They were married for twenty years. He married his second wife, Tania Gogos Wilson, in 1999. They have two children. Through Tania, Wilson is the stepfather of actress and model, Olympia Valance.

== Discography ==
=== Studio albums ===
List of studio albums, with selected details and chart positions
| Title | Album details | Peak chart positions |
| Title | Album details | AUS |
|---|---|---|
| Dark Side of the Man | Released: July 1989; Label: WEA (256405.2) | 28 |
| Go Bongo Go Wild! | Released: 2001; Label: Wild Bongo (WBR 001) | — |
| Country and Wilson | Released: 2003; Label: Sound Vault (SV0360) | — |
| Tributary | Released: 2008; Label: Liberation Music (BLUE161.2) | 99 |
| I Come in Peace | Released: 2010; Label: Shock (CD-1181) | — |

=== Soundtrack albums ===
List of soundtrack albums, with selected details and chart positions
| Title | Album details | Peak chart positions |
| Title | Album details | AUS |
|---|---|---|
| Oz – A Rock 'n' Roll Road Movie | Released: 1976; Format: LP; Label: OZ Records (OZS 1001); Original Motion Picture Soundtrack | 54 |

=== Extended plays ===
List of EPs, with selected details
| Title | Details |
|---|---|
| She's Stuck On Facebook All the Time | Released: 9 June 2023; Format: digital; Label: Bloodlines |
| Slave to My Emotions | Released: 4 July 2025; Format: digital; Label: Mushroom |

=== Charting singles ===
List of singles, with selected chart positions
| Title | Year | Peak chart positions | Album |
| Title | Year | AUS | Album |
|---|---|---|---|
| "Living in the Land of Oz" | 1976 | 46 | Oz – A Rock 'n' Roll Road Movie |
| "Bed of Nails" | 1989 | 25 | Dark Side of the Man |
| "Eagle Rock" (with The Wiggles) | 2003 | 80 | Non-album single |

=== See also ===
- The Pink Finks
- Procession (band)
- Sons of the Vegetal Mother
- Daddy Cool (band)
- Mighty Kong (band)
- Mondo Rock

== Awards and nominations ==
=== ARIA Music Awards ===
The ARIA Music Awards is an annual awards ceremony that recognises excellence, innovation, and achievement across all genres of Australian music.

| Year | Nominee / work | Award | Result | Ref. |
|---|---|---|---|---|
| 1989 | himself | ARIA Hall of Fame | inducted | |

=== Australian Songwriters Hall of Fame ===
The Australian Songwriters Hall of Fame was established in 2004 to honour the lifetime achievements of some of Australia's greatest songwriters.

| Year | Nominee / work | Award | Result | Ref. |
| 2009 | himself | Australian Songwriters Hall of Fame | inducted | |
