= Come Said the Boy =

1983 song by Mondo Rock

Single by Mondo Rock

from the album The Modern Bop
- Released: 28 November 1983
- Recorded: August 1983
- Studio: Fast Forward Studios
- Genre: Rock, pop rock
- Length: 4:41
- Label: WEA
- Songwriter: Eric McCusker
- Producers: John Sayers, Mondo Rock

Mondo Rock singles chronology
"In Another Love" (1983)	"Come Said the Boy" (1983)	"Baby Wants to Rock" (1984)

"Come Said the Boy" is a song by Australian rock band Mondo Rock, released in November 1983 as the lead single from the band's fourth studio album The Modern Bop (1984). The song became the band's highest-charting single, peaking at number 2 on the Kent Music Report. It was written by the group's lead guitarist, Eric McCusker, and was co-produced by John Sayers and the band.

The music video and vinyl single's cover artwork was filmed at Maroubra Beach in Sydney in 1983.

At the 1983 Countdown Music Awards, the song was nominated for Best Australian Single.

In January 2018, as part of Triple M's "Ozzest 100", the 'most Australian' songs of all time, "Come Said The Boy" was ranked number 73.

== Background ==
By 1983 the Mondo Rock line-up were James Black (ex-Rum Jungle, Russell Morris Band) on keyboards and guitar; James Gillard on bass guitar; John James Hackett (ex-Stars, the Fabulaires) on drums; Eric McCusker (ex-The Captain Matchbox Whoopee Band) on guitar and Ross Wilson (ex-Daddy Cool) on lead vocals. They started recording their fourth studio album, The Modern Bop (March 1984), in August 1983 with co-production by John Sayer and the band.

In November 1983 the album's lead single, "Come Said the Boy", was released, which peaked at number 2 on the Kent Music Report singles chart in the following month. It was written by McCusker as a provocative tale about the loss of virginity—it was banned by some radio stations, including Sydney's then top-rated 2SM, which was affiliated with the Roman Catholic Church. McCusker later recalled, "I can't remember if [the title] was a smutty pun. I think there was a little bit of that." He elaborated, "[It's] a linear song with a lot of ocean imagery... Back then, I was interested in seeing what you could get away with."

== Track listings ==
Aus 7" Single

1. "Come Said the Boy" (Eric McCusker) – 4:41
2. "Gotta Get Out" (Ross Wilson) – 3:27

US 7" Single

1. "Come Said the Boy" (Eric McCusker) – 3:57
2. "Cost of Living" (Eric McCusker, John James Hackett, Ross Wilson, James Black) – 4:06

== Charts ==
=== Weekly charts ===
Chart (1983/84)	Peak position
Australia (Kent Music Report)	2
New Zealand (Recorded Music NZ)	43

=== Year-end charts ===
Chart (1984)	Position
Australia (Kent Music Report)	13

== Damon Boyd version ==
"The First Time"

Single by Damon Boyd vs. Mondo Rock

from the album Mondo Rock The Greatest
- Released: May 2004
- Genre: Progressive house
- Length: 3:16
- Label: Vicious Vinyl
- Songwriter: Eric McCusker

Mondo Rock singles chronology
"Soul Reason" (1991)	"The First Time" (2004)

Melbourne-based DJ Damon Boyd provided a cover version as "The First Time" (DJ Damon Boyd vs. Mondo Rock), in May 2004. "The First Time" samples the opening riff and vocal of the original. The single peaked at number 79 on the ARIA Charts.

=== Track listings ===
Aus CD single (VV12058CD)

1. "The First Time" (original radio edit) – 3:16
2. "The First Time" (Ivan Gough's starfish remix – radio edit) – 3:16
3. "The First Time" (original 12" vocal) – 6:27
4. "The First Time" (Ivan Gough's starfish remix) – 8:32
5. "The First Time" (original 12" dub) – 8:13
6. "The First Time" (Ivan Gough's starfish dub) – 6:16

=== Charts ===
Chart (2004)	Peak position
Australia ARIA Charts	79
Australian Dance ARIA Report	8

== Other cover versions ==
John Farnham released his cover version of the track on his 19th studio album, I Remember When I Was Young (November 2005). Tex Perkins' rendition appeared on his 5th studio album, No. 1's and No. 2's (October 2008).
