= Chemistry (Mondo Rock song) =

Single by Mondo Rock

from the album Chemistry
- Released: July 1981
- Genre: Rock
- Length: 3:34
- Label: Avenue Records
- Songwriters: Eric McCusker, Paul Christie
- Producer: Mark Moffatt

Mondo Rock singles chronology
"Cool World" (1981)	"Chemistry" (1981)	"Summer of '81" (1981)

"Chemistry" is a song by Australian rock band Mondo Rock, released in July 1981 as the third single from the band's second studio album Chemistry (1981). The song peaked at number 20 on the Kent Music Report.

== Track listing ==
AUS 7" Single

No.	Title	Writer(s)	Length
1.	"Chemistry (Edited Version)"	Eric McCusker, Paul Christie	3:34
2.	"Searching For My Baby (Live)"	Ross Wilson	4:37

== Charts ==
Chart (1981)	Peak position
Australia (Kent Music Report)	20

== Personnel ==
- Ross Wilson – vocals, guitar, harmonica (1976–1991)
- John James Hackett – drums, percussion, guitar (1981–1990)
- James Gillard – bass guitar (1982–1990)
- James Black – keyboards (1980–1984)
- Eric McCusker – guitar, keyboards (1980–1991)
- Paul Christie – bass guitar (1980–1982)
