= Summer of '81 =

"Summer Of '81"

Single by Mondo Rock

from the album Chemistry
- Released: October 1981
- Studio: AAV
- Genre: Rock
- Length: 3:56
- Label: Avenue Records
- Songwriter(s): Eric McCusker
- Producer(s): Mark Moffatt

Mondo Rock singles chronology
"Chemistry" (1981)	"Summer Of '81" (1981)	"No Time" (1982)

"Summer of '81" is a song by Australian rock band Mondo Rock, released in October 1981. It is the fourth and final single to be released from the band's second studio album Chemistry (1981). The song was written by Mondo Rock guitarist Eric McCusker. It peaked at number 31 on the Kent Music Report.

== Track listing ==
1. "Summer of '81" (Eric McCusker) - 3:56
2. "Mona Lisa (She Smiles)" (E. McCusker) - 4:06
3. "The Fugitive Kind" (live in concert) - 3:47

== Charts ==
Chart (1981/82)	Peak position
Australia (Kent Music Report)	31
