= State of the Heart (Mondo Rock song) =

Single by Mondo Rock

from the album Chemistry
- Released: October 1980
- Studio: AAV Studios
- Genre: Rock
- Length: 4:17
- Label: Avenue Records, WEA NZ, Atlantic Records US, UK & Canada
- Songwriter: Eric McCusker
- Producer: Ern Rose

Mondo Rock singles chronology
"Primal Park" (1979)	"State of the Heart" (1980)	"Cool World" (1981)

"State of the Heart" is a song written by Eric McCusker. In Australia, it is best known for being recorded by Australian rock group Mondo Rock (of whom McCusker was a member); the track was released in October 1980 as the lead single from the band's second studio album, Chemistry (1981), and peaked at number 6 on the Australian Kent Music Report.

Mondo Rock's recording of the song was not a hit outside of Australia. In the United States, "State of the Heart" is best remembered for a recording by Rick Springfield, which peaked at number 22 on the Billboard Hot 100 singles chart in 1985. Springfield's version of the song was also a minor hit in Canada and Germany. Springfield performed "State of the Heart" at a Live Aid concert in Philadelphia at JFK Stadium on 13 July 1985.

The song was featured in the 2016 movie, Lion starring Dev Patel and Nicole Kidman.

== Background ==
In 1980 writer Eric McCusker was signed with Warner Chappell to write songs to sell to other people. He joined Mondo Rock the same year but didn't think they'd be interested in the song. In 2015 he explained "I didn’t think Mondo Rock would be interested in a ballad, we were playing fairly full on rockier stuff. Then I played the band the demos and they were like … what’s the matter? You keeping your best songs for other people?"

McCusker added "The solo is pretty much a restating of the melody of the verses with a bit extra. Then Ross did the falsetto singing over the top of it. So the concept of not having a middle where it gets big and fills up, it sort of emptied out and took the emphasis to the bottom end with the bass playing. I thought it was a really interesting thing and then Rick Springfield recorded that song and got completely rid of that and wrote a vocal bridge for it … it was like … coward. Made me some money though so that was good!".

== Track listing ==
AUS 7" Single

No.	Title	Writer(s)	Length
1.	"State of the Heart"	Eric McCusker	4:17
2.	"Mona Lisa (She Smiles)"	Eric McCusker	3:52

== Charts ==
=== Weekly charts ===
Chart (1981/82)	Peak position
Australia (Kent Music Report)	6

=== Year-end charts ===
Chart (1981)	Position
Australian (Kent Music Report)	38

== Cover versions ==
- Australian Rick Springfield covered the song for his 1985 album, Tao. This was the second of three singles from the album, and it peaked at number 22 on the Billboard Hot 100 singles chart in the United States. Springfield performed the song at a Live Aid concert in Philadelphia at JFK Stadium on 13 July 1985.
- Australian rock outfit Pollyanna for the soundtrack of the 1999 film Bigger Than Tina.
