= Mondo Rock =

Australian rock band

- Origin: Melbourne, Victoria, Australia
- Genres: Rock; pub rock; sophisti-pop; pop rock
- Years active: 1976–1991, 2006–2007, 2014–present
- Labels: Oz; Avenue; EMI; Atlantic; RCA; WEA; Polygram; Polydor; Columbia; J&B; BMG; Sony
- Members: Ross Wilson; Eric McCusker; James Black; Paul Christie; Gil Matthews
- Past members: See members

Mondo Rock are an Australian rock band, formed in November 1976 in Melbourne, Victoria. Singer-songwriter Ross Wilson founded the band, following the split of his previous band Daddy Cool. Guitarist Eric McCusker, who joined in 1980, wrote many of the band's hits, and along with Wilson formed the core of the group. They are best known for their second album, Chemistry, which was released in July 1981 and peaked at number 3 on the Australian Kent Music Report. Their song "Come Said the Boy" peaked at number two in Australia in 1984.

Mondo Rock disbanded in 1991, although they periodically appeared at reunion concerts, and reformed on a more-or-less continuing basis in 2014. According to Australian musicologist Ian McFarlane, "by way of ceaseless touring and the release of a series of sophisticated pop rock albums, [the band was] one of the most popular acts in Australia during the early 1980s". The band had a national tour in 2019, and continues to play occasional dates.

== History ==
=== 1976–1979: Early years and Primal Park ===
Mondo Rock were formed in November 1976 in Melbourne by Bob Bickerton on drums (ex-Rock Granite and the Profiles); Mike Clarke on bass guitar (ex-Mick Rogers and Eclipse); Greg Cook on keyboards and guitar (ex-Cam-Pact, Skylight, Phil Manning Band); Peter Laffy on guitar (ex-Fox, Freeway); and Ross Wilson (ex-Daddy Cool) on lead vocals and harmonica.

Personnel turnover in the band (except for Wilson) was a constant, and by mid-1978, the line-up consisted of Wilson, Laffy, Randy Bulpin (guitars), Tony Slavich (keyboards), Simon Gyllies (bass) and Iain McLennan (drums). In September 1978, this line-up of Mondo Rock released their debut single, "The Fugitive Kind", on Oz Records which peaked at number 49 on the Australian Kent Music Report. Slavich left shortly thereafter.

After recording and issuing another single ("Love Shock", which didn't chart), in May 1979 the band recorded live material for use on their debut album, which was to be an unusual mix of live tracks and studio recordings. A few months later in 1979, the line-up of Wilson, Gyllies, Randy Bulpin, Laffy, McLennan and new keyboardist Rex Bullen recorded the studio material for their debut album, Primal Park, which was issued on the Oz label via EMI Records and peaked at number 40 in Australia. The album yielded two singles, "Searching for My Baby" (September) and "Primal Park" (November), neither of which charted. McLennan contracted hepatitis as the band was due to tour to promote the album, so he was replaced, first by Eddie Van Roosendael (ex-Stiletto), and then by Gil Matthews (ex-Billy Thorpe & the Aztecs) on drums, for the tour.

=== 1980–1984: Breakthrough – Chemistry, Nuovo Mondo and The Modern Bop ===
In February 1980, an almost entirely new version of Mondo Rock debuted. The new line-up consisted of Wilson, Matthews and James Black (ex-Rum Jungle, Russell Morris Band) on keyboards and guitar; Paul Christie (ex-Kevin Borich Express) on bass guitar; and Eric McCusker (ex-The Captain Matchbox Whoopee Band) on guitar. Wilson's role as frontman and songwriter would remain an important part of Mondo Rock, but McCusker would come to be the other Mondo Rock mainstay, eventually becoming responsible for writing the majority of their material.

This line-up released their first major hit single, "State of the Heart" in October 1980, which peaked at number 6 on the Kent Music Report. The track was written by McCusker, taking some of the pressure off Wilson, who was experiencing temporary writer's block. Matthews left after the single appeared and was replaced by Andy Buchanan (ex-Darryl Cotton Band) who stayed long enough to drum on a few cuts. Their next single, "Cool World", appeared in April 1981 and was also successful on the chart, reaching No. 8. Buchanan left shortly before the single was issued, and was replaced by John James "J. J." Hackett (ex-Stars, the Fabulaires).

The band's second album, Chemistry was released in July 1981 and peaked at number two on the Kent Music Report. Two more singles were released from the album with "Chemistry" peaking at number 20 and "Summer of '81" at 31. The royalties from "Summer of '81" single were donated to Amnesty International.

In June 1982, Mondo Rock released "No Time", the lead single from the band's third studio album. According to McCusker, "No Time" was inspired by The Beatles' "Don't Let Me Down", as a tribute to John Lennon. The song peaked at number 11 in Australia. In July 1982 the band released its third studio album Nuovo Mondo, on RCA / WEA, which peaked at number seven in Australia. Christie left the group in September and subsequently formed an all-star band, The Party Boys; he was replaced on bass guitar by James Gillard. Two additional singles were released, "The Queen and Me" and "In Another Love". The album also includes "A Touch of Paradise" which was released in February 1987 by Australian pop singer John Farnham, as his third single from his album, Whispering Jack and reached the Australian top 30.

By 1983, the Mondo Rock line-up of Wilson, Black, Gillard, Hackett, and McCusker started recording their fourth studio album. In December, the album's lead single "Come Said the Boy" was released, which peaked at number two in Australia. The song is a provocative tale about the loss of virginity and was banned by many radio stations including Sydney's then top-rated 2SM – which was affiliated with the Roman Catholic Church. The Modern Bop was released in March 1984 and peaked at number 5 in Australia. The album yielded two more singles, "Baby Wants to Rock" and "The Modern Bop". Black left the group later in the year, and was not immediately replaced, with Mondo Rock continuing as a four-piece band.

=== 1985–1991: Up to the Moment and Boom Baby Boom ===
In June 1985 Polydor Records released the band's first compilation album Up to the Moment, which peaked at number 5. The album produced two singles, "Good Advice" and "The Moment". On 13 July 1985 Mondo Rock performed four tracks for the Oz for Africa concert (part of the global Live Aid program). The concert was broadcast in Australia (on both Seven Network and Nine Network) and on MTV in the US.

The group's fifth studio album, Boom Baby Boom was released in September 1986 with the line-up swelling to a sextet, as Wilson, Gillard, Hackett, and McCusker were joined by new members Andrew Ross on saxophone and Duncan Veall on keyboards. The album peaked at number 27 in Australia. The album's second single "Primitive Love Rites" was released in October 1986 and peaked in the top 40 in Australia and in 1987, became a minor hit on the US ''Billboard'' Hot 100 and reached the top 40 on its Mainstream Rock chart. In November 1987, the band released an extended play titled, Aliens. Wilson disbanded the group early the following year and recorded a solo album, The Dark Side of the Man, which included a top 40 single, "Bed of Nails", in June 1989.

In 1990 Mondo Rock—officially now simply the duo of Wilson and McCusker, aided by session players—reconvened and recorded the group's sixth studio album, Why Fight It?, which was issued in November 1990. Three singles were released from the album, "Why Fight It?", "I Had You in Mind" and "Soul Reason"; none peaked higher than number 94 on the national charts. In 1991 Wilson dissolved the group again.

=== 1991–present: After disbandment ===
After disbanding Mondo Rock, Wilson initially formed RAW with Barry Deenik on bass guitar; Michael Sheridan on guitar (ex-No); and Craig Waugh on drums (ex-Uncanny X-Men). They performed on the pub rock circuit until 1993 and then Wilson continued his solo career. Black had left in 1984 and worked in a variety of groups including GANGgajang (1984), Men at Work (1985), and The Black Sorrows (1985, 1994, 2004). By the mid-1990s, McCusker was a director for the Australasian Performing Right Association. From 2005, Black featured on the Australian TV quiz show RocKwiz on SBS, as a member of the house band the RocKwiz Orkestra.

In 2006, the line-up of Wilson, Black, Christie and McCusker appeared in the 2006 Countdown Spectacular concert series and performing a medley of "Cool World" and "Summer of '81" and a full version of "Come Said the Boy".

In June 2014, the band reunited to perform their 1981 album Chemistry. The 2014 Mondo Rock line-up was exactly the same line-up that played on the 1980 single "State of the Heart", as well as a few tracks on Chemistry: Ross Wilson, Eric McCusker, James Black, Paul Christie and Gil Matthews. The band released Besto Mondo in August 2015. The band toured nationally in 2019, and they continue to play live.

On 8 May 2020, the band released their first-ever live album, Summer of '81, Live at the Pier.

== Members ==
Credits:

Current members

- Ross Wilson – lead vocals, guitar, harmonica (1976–1991, 2006–2007, 2014–present)
- Gil Matthews – drums (1979–1980, 2014–present)
- Eric McCusker – guitar, keyboards, backing vocals (1980–1991, 2006–2007, 2014–present)
- James Black – keyboards, backing vocals (1980–1984, 2006–2007, 2014–present)
- Paul Christie – bass guitar (1980–1982, 2006–2007, 2014–present)

Former members

- Bob Bickerton – drums (1976)
- Mike Clarke – bass guitar (1976)
- Greg Cook – keyboards, guitar (1976)
- Peter Laffy – guitar, backing vocals (1976–1978)
- Trevor Courtney – drums (1977–1978)
- Barry Sullivan – bass guitar (1977–1978)
- Ian Winter – guitar (1977–1978)
- Gunther Gorman – guitar (1977)
- Chris Jones – guitar (1978)
- Simon Gyllies – bass guitar (1978–1979)
- Iain McClennan – drums, backing vocals, occasional lead vocals (1978–1979)

Former members (cont'd)

- Tony Slavich – keyboards (1978–1979)
- Randy Bulpin – guitar (1978–1979)
- Eddie Van Roosendael – drums (1979)
- Simon Philips – bass guitar (1979)
- Andrew Bell – guitar (1980)
- Kerry Jacobsen – drums, backing vocals (1980, 2006–2007)
- Andy Buchanan – drums (1981)
- John James Hackett – drums, percussion, guitar (1981–1990)
- James Gillard – bass guitar (1982–1990)
- Andrew Ross – saxophone, keyboards (1986–1990)
- Duncan Veall – keyboards (1984–1990)
- Colin Newham – keyboards (1988)
- Ian Belton – bass guitar (1990–1991)
- Mitch Farmer – drums (1990)
- Sean Timms – keyboards (1990)
- Mary Azzopardi – backing vocals (1991)
- Mark Williams – backing vocals (1991)
- Bernie Worrell – keyboards (1991)

== Discography ==
- Primal Park (1979)
- Chemistry (1981)
- Nuovo Mondo (1982)
- The Modern Bop (1984)
- Boom Baby Boom (1986)
- Why Fight It? (1990)

== Awards and nominations ==
=== TV Week / Countdown awards ===
Countdown was an Australian pop music TV series on national broadcaster ABC-TV from 1974 to 1987; it presented music awards from 1979 to 1987, initially in conjunction with magazine TV Week. The TV Week / Countdown awards were a combination of popular-voted and peer-voted awards.

Year	Nominee / work	Award	Result
1980	"State of the Heart"	Best Single Record	Nominated
1981	Chemistry	Best Australian Album	Won
1981	"Cool World"	Best Australian Single	Nominated
1981	Eric McCusker – Mondo Rock	Best Australian Songwriter	Won
1981	Themselves	Most Consistent Live Act	Nominated
1983	"Come Said the Boy"	Best Australian Single	Nominated
