= Dragon discography =

- Studio albums: 16
- Extended plays: 2
- Live albums: 5
- Compilation albums: 10
- Singles: 33

This is the discography of Dragon, a popular rock band formed in Auckland, New Zealand, in January 1972, who relocated to Sydney, Australia in May 1975. They were previously led by singer Marc Hunter, and are currently led by his brother, bass player Todd Hunter. They performed and released material under the name Hunter in Europe and United States during 1987.

== Albums ==
=== Studio albums ===
Title	Album details	Peak chart positions		Certifications
Title	Album details	AUS	NZ	Certifications
Universal Radio	Released: June 1974; Vertigo Records (6360902)	—	—	
Scented Gardens for the Blind	Released: February 1975; Vertigo Records (6360903)	—	—	
Sunshine	Released: February 1977; CBS (SBP 234946)	24	—	AUS: Gold
Running Free	Released: November 1977; Portrait Records (33005)	6	16	AUS: 3× Platinum
O Zambezi	Released: September 1978; Portrait (PR33010)	3	17	AUS: Platinum
Power Play	Released: September 1979; CBS (237352)	64	—	
Body and the Beat	Released: June 1984; Polydor (817874-1)	5	—	AUS: Platinum
Dreams of Ordinary Men Released in U.S. / Europe by Hunter in 1987	Released: August 1986; Polydor (829828-1)	18	—	AUS: Platinum
Bondi Road	Released: April 1989; RCA (0170)	18	22	AUS: Gold
Incarnations	Released: 1995; Roadshow Music (14251-2)	55	—	
Sunshine to Rain	Released: 27 June 2006; Label: Liberation Music (Blue090.2)	87	—	
Remembers	Released: 25 March 2009; Label: Dragon	—	—	
Happy I Am	Released: 14 June 2009; Label: Dragon Records	—	—	
It's All Too Beautiful	Released: 2 February 2011; Label: Ozmo Music	—	—	
Roses	Released: 14 September 2014; Label: Ozmo Music	—	—	
Dragon Celebrates Countdown 80s UK Chartbusters	Released: 24 August 2018; Label: Ozmo Music	—	—	
Life Is a Beautiful Mess	Released: 24 August 2018; Label: Ozmo Music			
"—" denotes a recording that did not chart or was not released in that territory.

=== Live albums ===
Title	Album details	Peak chart positions	
Title	Album details	AUS	NZ
Live One	Released: June 1985; Label: Polydor Records	62	49
Live 2008	Released: 25 March 2009; Label: Dragon	—	—
Live in Melbourne 1989	Released: 25 March 2009; Label: Dragon	—	—
Live in the 70s	Released: 25 March 2009; Label: Dragon	—	—
"—" denotes a recording that did not chart or was not released in that territory.

=== Compilation albums ===
Title	Album details	Peak chart positions		Certifications
Title	Album details	AUS	NZ	Certifications
Dragon's Greatest Hits Vol. 1	Released: April 1979; Label: CBS Records (237294)	8	—	
Are You Old Enough	Released: 1983; Label: K-Tel (NA 662)	—	—	
So Far: Their Classic Collection	Released: January 1988; Label: J & B (JB 325)	26	—	
The Best of Dragon and Mondo Rock (with Mondo Rock)	Released: June 1990; Label: J & B (JB 418)	47	—	
Cuts from the Tough Times	Released: November 1990; Label: Polydor (843 257–2)	—	—	
Snake Eyes on the Paradise Greatest Hits 1976-1989	Released: April 1998; Label: Raven (RVCD-76)	70	—	
Tales from the Dark Side Greatest Hits and Choice Collectables 1974–1997	Released: July 1998; Label: Raven (RVCD-80)	186	—	
The Essential Dragon	Released: 7 April 2007; Label: Sony BMG (88697069592)	—	—	
The Very Best of Dragon	Released: March 2010; Label: Sony Music (88697684102)	151	4	NZ: Gold
The Dragon Years - 40th Anniversary Collection	Released: 28 September 2012; Label: Liberation (LMCD0196) / Universal Music Australia	150	21	
50 - The Greatest Hits	Released: 5 April 2024; Label: Universal Music Australia (5399793)	— (Note: 50 - The Greatest Hits (listed on ARIA asCelebrating 50 Years of Dragon) did not enter the ARIA Top 100 Chart, but peaked at number 19 on the Australian Artists Album Chart.)	—	
"—" denotes a recording that did not chart or was not released in that territory.

== Extended plays ==
Title	EP details
Chase the Sun	Released: 2 September 2011; Label: Ozomusic
The Great Divide	Released: November 2011; Label: Ozomusic

== Singles ==
Year	Title	Album	Label	Peak chart positions			Certification
Year	Title	Album	Label	AUS	NZ	US	Certification
1975	"Vermillion Cellars"	Scented Gardens for the Blind	Vertigo	—	—	—	
1975	"Education"	Single only release	Vertigo	—	—	—	
1975	"Star Kissed"	Single only release	Vertigo	—	—	—	
1976	"Wait Until Tomorrow"	Single only release	CBS / Portrait	—	—	—	
1976	"This Time"	Sunshine	CBS / Portrait	26	—	—	
1977	"Get That Jive"	Sunshine	CBS / Portrait	13	—	—	
1977	"Sunshine"	Sunshine	CBS / Portrait	36	—	—	AUS: Gold
1977	"April Sun in Cuba"	Running Free	CBS / Portrait	2	9	—	RMNZ: 4× Platinum; AUS: Gold
1978	"Shooting Stars"	Running Free	CBS / Portrait	58	—	—	
1978	"Konkaroo"	Dragon's Greatest Hits Vol. 1	CBS / Portrait	40	—	—	
1978	"Are You Old Enough?"	O Zambezi	Portrait	1	5	—	
1978	"Still in Love with You"	O Zambezi	Portrait	27	35	—	
1979	"Love's Not Enough"	Single only release	CBS	37	—	—	
1979	"Counting Sheep"	Power Play	CBS	—	—	—	
1979	"Motor City Connections"	Power Play	CBS	—	—	—	
1982	"Ramona"	Single only release	EMI Music	79	—	—	
1983	"Rain"	Body and the Beat	Polydor	2	—	88	
1983	"Magic"	Body and the Beat	Polydor	33	—	—	
1984	"Cry"	Body and the Beat	Polydor	17	—	—	
1984	"Wilderworld"	Body and the Beat	Polydor	42	—	—	
1984	"Body and the Beat"	Body and the Beat	Polydor	—	—	—	
1985	"Speak No Evil"	Dreams of Ordinary Men	Polydor	19	—	—	
1986	"Dreams of Ordinary Men"	Dreams of Ordinary Men	Polydor	17	43	—	
1986	"Western Girls"	Dreams of Ordinary Men	Polydor	58	37	—	
1987	"Nothing to Lose"	Dreams of Ordinary Men	Polydor	—	—	—	
1987	"Celebration"	Bondi Road	RCA	11	—	—	
1988	"River"	Single only release	RCA	81	—	—	
1989	"Young Years"	Bondi Road	RCA	18	13	—	
1989	"Here Am I"	Bondi Road	RCA	77	—	—	
1989	"Summer"	Bondi Road	RCA	57	—	—	
1990	"Book of Love"	Bondi Road	RCA	—	—	—	
1995	"Chains of Love"	Incarnations	Roadshow music	238	—	—	
2011	"Chase the Sun"	Chase the Sun	Ozmomusic	—	—	—	
"—" denotes a recording that did not chart or was not released in that territory.
