= The Very Best of Dragon =

Greatest hits album by Dragon
- Released: March 2010
- Recorded: 1976–1989
- Genre: Rock, pop
- Label: Sony Music Australia

Dragon chronology
Happy I Am (2009)	The Very Best of Dragon (2010)	It's All Too Beautiful (2011)

The Very Best of Dragon is a compilation album by the New Zealand band Dragon. The album was first released in New Zealand in March 2010 and peaked at number 4.

== Track listing ==
No.	Title	Writer(s)	Album	Length
1.	"April Sun in Cuba"	Marc Hunter; Paul Hewson	Running Free
2.	"Are You Old Enough?"	Hewson	O Zambezi
3.	"Still in Love with You"	Hewson	O Zambezi
4.	"Rain"	Johanna Pigott; M. Hunter; Todd Hunter	Body and the Beat
5.	"Celebration"	Ronald Nathan Bell; Claydes Charles Smith; George Melvin Brown; James "J.T." Taylor; Robert Spike Mickens; Earl Eugene Toon Jr.; Dennis Ronald Thomas; Robert Earl Bell; Eumir Deodato	Bondi Road
6.	"Get that Jive"	Hewson	Sunshine
7.	"This Time"	M. Hunter; Neil Storey; Hewson; T. Hunter	Sunshine
8.	"Konkaroo"	Hewson	Dragon's Greatest Hits Vol. 1
9.	"Island Nights" (credited to Marc Hunter)	Sam Egorin; Tony Scuito
10.	"Love's Not Enough"	Hewson	non-album single
11.	"Magic"	M. Hunter; R. Taylor	Body and the Beat
12.	"Young Years"	Alan Mansfield; Sharon O'Neill	Bondi Road
13.	"Speak No Evil"	Mansfield; Steve Piggot; T. Hunter	Dreams of Ordinary Men
14.	"Dreams of Ordinary Men"	Mansfield; Doane Perry; M. Hunter; T. Hunter; Todd Rundgren	Dreams of Ordinary Men
15.	"Western Girls"	Piggot; T. Hunter	Dreams of Ordinary Men
16.	"River"	T. Hinter	non-album single
17.	"Summer"	David Hirschfelder; M. Hunter; Wendy Hunter	Bondi Road

== Charts ==
Chart (2010)	Peak position
Australia (ARIA Charts)	151
New Zealand Albums (RMNZ)	4

=== Certifications ===
Country	Certification
New Zealand	Gold

== Release history ==
Region	Date	Format	Edition(s)	Label	Catalogue
New Zealand	29 March 2010	CD; digital download	Standard	Sony Music	150262
Australia	9 July 2010	CD	Standard	Sony BMG	88697748982
