= The Dragon Years =

Compilation album by Dragon
- Released: 28 September 2012
- Recorded: 1976–2011
- Genre: Rock, pop
- Label: Liberation Records

Dragon chronology
The Great Divide (2011)	The Dragon Years (2012)	Roses (2014)

The Dragon Years (subtitled The 40th Anniversary Collection) is a compilation album by the New Zealand band Dragon. The album was released in September 2012 and peaked at number 21 in the New Zealand chart.

This comprehensive 40 track, 2-CD set contains a disc of all the hits, and a special second disc of new songs recorded since the band reformed in 2006.

Upon release, band member Todd Hunter said; “When a band has been around for 40 years it’s just not possible to thank everyone who should be acknowledged within the confines of a cramped CD cover. From the 40 musicians who have been through the band in the last 4 decades to all those who have been through the Dragon crews in different eras we salute you. To all the record companies we have plagued and all managers who had to manage the unmanageable in the early days, cheers. We must acknowledge the songwriters for their memorable songs that are a joy to play and have such longevity that the 20 year olds are googling the lyrics on their phones and singing along at the shows now.“

To promote the release, Dragon toured New Zealand in October and November 2012.

== Track listing ==
Disc one
No.	Title	Writer(s)	Album	Length
1.	"April Sun in Cuba"	Marc Hunter; Paul Hewson	Running Free	3:34
2.	"Young Years"	Alan Mansfield; Sharon O'Neill	Bondi Road	4:03
3.	"Rain"	Johanna Pigott; M. Hunter; Todd Hunter	Body and the Beat	3:45
4.	"Are You Old Enough?"	Hewson	O Zambezi	4:13
5.	"Dreams of Ordinary Men"	Mansfield; Duane Perry; M. Hunter; T. Hunter; Todd Rundgren	Dreams of Ordinary Men	4:06
6.	"Get that Jive"	Hewson	Sunshine	2:52
7.	"Magic"	M. Hunter; R. Taylor	Body and the Beat	4:01
8.	"Konkaroo"	Hewson	Dragon's Greatest Hits Vol. 1	3:33
9.	"Still in Love with You"	Hewson	O Zambezi	3:31
10.	"Gold in the River"	Brent Thomas; M. Hunter; Mike Caen	Bondi Road	4:20
11.	"This Time"	M. Hunter; Neil Storey; Hewson; T. Hunter	Sunshine	3:14
12.	"Western Girls"	Piggot; T. Hunter	Dreams of Ordinary Men	4:15
13.	"River"	T. Hinter	non-album single	3:31
14.	"Sunshine"	Hewson	Sunshine	4:58
15.	"Body and the Beat"	M. Hunter; T. Hinter	Body and the Beat	4:32
16.	"Summer"	David Hirschfelder; M. Hunter; Wendy Hunter	Bondi Road	3:45
17.	"Book of Love"	Pigott; T. Hunter	Bondi Road	4:26
18.	"Speak No Evil"	Mansfield; Steve Piggot; T. Hunter	Dreams of Ordinary Men	4:04
19.	"O Zambezi"	R. Taylor	O Zambezi	4:33
20.	"Celebration"	Ronald Nathan Bell; Claydes Charles Smith; George Melvin Brown; James "J.T." Taylor; Robert Spike Mickens; Earl Eugene Toon Jr.; Dennis Ronald Thomas; Robert Earl Bell; Eumir Deodato	Bondi Road	3:56

Disc two
No.	Title	Writer(s)	Album	Length
1.	"Rainy Day"	Mark Williams; P. Drummond; T. Hunter; Reid; Piggot	The Great Divide	3:39
2.	"Rain" (1984 US Dance Mix)	Pigott; M. Hunter; Todd Hunter
3.	"New Blue Moon"	T. Hunter; Piggot	The Great Divide	3:35
4.	"21 (Heart of Gold)"	P. Drummond; R. Drummond	Chase the Sun	3:37
5.	"Chase the Sun"	P. Drummond; R. Drummond	Chase the Sun	3:21
6.	"Don't I Look Like Jim"	B. Reid	The Great Divide	3:56
7.	"Call Out"	P. Drummond; R. Drummond	The Great Divide	3:42
8.	"Find My Way Home"	T. Hunter; Piggot	Happy I Am	4:13
9.	"Great Divide"		The Great Divide	3:57
10.	"Goodbye Babylon"	Williams; P. Drummond; T. Hunter; Reid; Piggot	Happy I Am	4:38
11.	"Radio Song"	P. Drummond; R. Drummond	The Great Divide	2:57
12.	"On the Road"	Williams; P. Drummond; T. Hunter; Reid; Piggot	Happy I Am	5:05
13.	"God of Small Things"	T. Hunter; Piggot	Happy I Am	4:10
14.	"When I Was Young"	Eric Burdon; Vic Briggs; John Weider; Barry Jenkins; Danny McCulloch	It's All Too Beautiful	3:36
15.	"Mad World"	B. Reid; P. Drummond	Chase the Sun	3:33
16.	"Words"	P. Drummond
17.	"Happy I Am"	T. Hunter; Piggot	Happy I Am	3:47
18.	"Kumera Dreaming"		The Great Divide	2:53
19.	"Take Me to the End"	P. Drummond; R. Drummond
20.	"Who I Am"	T. Hunter; Piggot	Happy I Am	2:56

== Charts ==
Chart (2012)	Peak position
Australia (ARIA Charts)	150
New Zealand Albums (RMNZ)	21

== Release history ==
Region	Date	Format	Edition(s)	Label	Catalogue
Australia	28 September 2012	CD	Standard	Liberation Records	LMCD0196
New Zealand	5 October 2012	CD; digital download	Standard	Universal Music	212068
