= Tales from the Dark Side Greatest Hits and Choice Collectables 1974–1997 =

Tales from the Dark Side Greatest Hits and Classic Collection 1974–1997

Greatest hits album by Dragon
- Released: August 1998
- Recorded: 1974–1997
- Genre: Rock
- Label: Raven

Dragon chronology
Snake Eyes on the Paradise Greatest Hits 1976–1989 (1998)	Tales from the Dark Side Greatest Hits and Classic Collection 1974–1997 (1998)	Sunshine to Rain (2006)

Tales from the Dark Side Greatest Hits and Classic Collectables 1974–1997 is a compilation album by rock music group, Dragon, released in August 1998. Disc one has the same track listing as Snake Eyes on the Paradise Greatest Hits 1976–1989, which was issued in the same year. Disc two consists of album tracks, live, b-sides and other rarities.

== Reception ==
Professional ratings
Review scores
Source	Rating
AllMusic	4/5 stars

Adrian Zupp from AllMusic said "Tales from the Dark Side: Greatest Hits and Choice Collectables 1974-1997 is really the ultimate Dragon compilation. Combining the full greatest-hits disc Snake Eyes on the Paradise with a second disc of delectable grab-bag material, this album contains virtually everything you need to know about this mythic New Zealand band. Disc One presents all of the slick hits... The second disc takes the listener deep below the surface with 19 tracks of B-sides, album cuts, live tracks, and other odds and rarities. Go back to the band's trippy beginnings and hear the Pink Floyd-meets-Santana vibe of the lengthy "Universal Radio," or the amazing cassette-player-recorded sound check of the band jamming on The Doors' "Soul Kitchen," with singer Marc Hunter ad-libbing new lyrics (here called "Final Years"). Apart from such alluring curiosities, the high points include the glossy pop/rock of "Shooting Stars", the disco boogie of "O Zambezi", and "The Empty Beach," which was penned by Cold Chisel keyboard player Don Walker." Zupp added "Perhaps tastier still is the handful of live tracks which really open the door to the past. There's the funky "Blacktown Boogie" (an ode to one of the toughest, rock & roll-loving suburbs of Sydney's notorious west side), an excellent cover of the Velvet Underground/Lou Reed classic "White Light/White Heat" and a deuce of Dragon's second-echelon songs: the high-energy "Dreaded Moroxy Bind." Tales From the Dark Side is a thoroughly entertaining document of the life and times of Dragon."

== Track listing ==
Disc 1

1. "This Time" (Marc Hunter, Neil Storey, Paul Hewson, Robert Taylor, Todd Hunter) - 3:09
2. "Get that Jive" (Paul Hewson) - 2:47
3. "Sunshine" (Paul Hewson) - 4:49
4. "April Sun in Cuba" (Marc Hunter, Paul Hewson) - 3:29
5. "Konkaroo" (Paul Hewson) - 3:29
6. "Are You Old Enough?" (Paul Hewson) - 4:08
7. "Still in Love With You" (Paul Hewson) - 3:27
8. "Love's Not Enough" (Paul Hewson) - 3:36
9. "Island Nights" (by Marc Hunter) (Sammy Egorin, Tony Scuito) - 3:15
10. "Ramona" (Paul Hewson) - 3:39
11. "Rain" (Johanna Pigott, Marc Hunter, Todd Hunter) - 3:40
12. "Magic" (Marc Hunter, Robert Taylor) - 3:57
13. "Cry" (Todd Hunter) - 3:43
14. "Wilderworld" (Johanna Pigott, Marc Hunter, Todd Hunter) - 3:50
15. "Speak No Evil" (Alan Mansfield, Johanna Pigott, Todd Hunter) - 4:00
16. "Dreams of Ordinary Men" (Alan Mansfield, Doane Perry, Johanna Pigott, Todd Hunter, Todd Rundgren) - 4:02
17. "Western Girls" (Alan Mansfield, Marc Hunter, Sharon O'Neill, Todd Rundgren) - 4:07
18. "Celebration" (Kool & the Gang, Ronald Bell) - 3:56
19. "River" (Todd Hunter) - 3:27
20. "Young Years" (Alan Mansfield, Sharon O'Neill) - 3:59
21. "Summer" (David Hirschfelder, Marc Hunter, Wendy Hunter) - 3:38

Disc 2

1. "Universal Radio" (Goodwin, M. Hunter, Thompson, Storey, T. Hunter) - 8:32
2. "Vermillion Cellars" (Marc Hunter, Todd Hunter, Ray Goodwin) - 3:23
3. "Education" (Ray Goodwin) - 3:28
4. "Star Kissed" (Ray Goodwin) - 2:31
5. "Show Danny Across the Water" (Paul Hewson) - 4:26
6. "Shooting Stars" (P. Hewson) - 3:30
7. "O Zambesi" (Robert Taylor)- 4:22
8. "Blacktown Boogie" (Marc Hunter, Robert M. Taylor, Todd Hunter) (Recorded Live at the Palais Theatre, St Kilda, 22 September 1977) - 3:30
9. "White Light/White Heat" (Lou Reed) (Recorded Live at the Palais Theatre, St Kilda, 22 September 1977) - 3:46
10. "Counting Sheep" (Billy Rogers, Paul Hewson) - 3:30
11. "The Empty Beach" (credited to Marc Hunter) - 3:28
12. "Dreaded Moroxy Bind" (Marc Hunter, Todd Hunter, Paul Henson, Robert Taylor, Neil Storey) (live) - 3:15
13. "Body and the Beat" (Marc Hunter, Robert Taylor) (Recorded Live at the Sydney Entertainment Centre, Sydney, 10 August 1984) - 4:25
14. "Smoke" (Johanna Pigott, Marc Hunter, Todd Hunter) - 4:42
15. "Blue, Blue is the Radio" (Alan Mansfield, Marc Hunter, Todd Hunter) - 3:46
16. "Heart of Fire" - 4:18
17. "Oh Now Girl" - 5:09
18. "Be All Right" - 3:58
19. "Final Years" (Recorded Live at Bombay Rock, Melbourne, January 1979) - 4:19
- NB: Disc 2, Tracks 18 & 19 are previously unreleased.
- NB: Disc 2, Tracks 3, 2, 15 & 16 are previously non-album tracks.

== Charts ==
Chart (1998)	Peak position
Australia (ARIA Charts)	186
