= Robert Taylor (Australian guitarist) =

Australian musician (1951–2025)

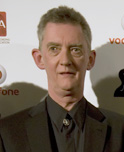
- Taylor in 2008

Background information
- Born: Robert MacLean Taylor; 16 April 1951; Waipukurau, North Island, New Zealand
- Died: 4 November 2025 (aged 74) Sydney, New South Wales, Australia
- Genres: Rock, country rock
- Occupation: Musician
- Instruments: electric guitar, acoustic guitar, slide guitar, vocals
- Years active: 1970–1985, 1995

Robert MacLean Taylor (16 April 1951 – 4 November 2025) was a New Zealand-born Australian guitarist who was best known as a member of the band Dragon during 1974–1984. Their top ten albums during his tenure are Running Free (1977), O Zambezi (1978) and Body and the Beat (1984). Dragon were inducted into the ARIA Hall of Fame in 2008 and the New Zealand Music Hall of Fame in 2011.

== Early life ==
Robert MacLean Taylor, was born in Waipukurau, a small town on the North Island of New Zealand, the son of an ice cream maker and a housewife. He received a scholarship to study English at Victoria University of Wellington, but left his studies for a music career.

== Career ==
In the early 1970s, Taylor was a member of various bands including Mandrake, Chum (country rockers) and the Windy City Strugglers (acoustic, blues) as well as performing solo gigs. After leaving Victoria University he joined Mammal on lead guitar in 1972 alongside Tony Backhouse on keyboards, Rick Bryant on lead vocals and tambourine, Steve Hemmens on bass guitar and Jeff Kennedy on drums. Mammal were managed by Graeme Nesbitt and were "playing basically dance-orientated music they soon got a reputation for being an arty band."

Mammal teamed with local poet Sam Hunt to jointly release a studio album, Beware the Man (1972). For the album the group's line-up was Taylor on guitars, slide guitar and vocals, Bryant on vocals and washboard; Patrick Bleakley on bass guitar and violoncello; Mike Fullarton on drums; Bill Lake on harmonica, guitars and vocals. They were joined by the Alex Lindsay String Quartet (Alex Lindsay, violin; Mrs. A. Lindsay, violin; Ken Burward-Hoy, viola; Wilfred Simenauer, violoncello). Mammal attended the Ngaruawahia Music Festival in January 1973, where they "gave one of their better performances". In June of that year Kerry Jacobson joined on drums. Mammal disbanded after a farewell performance at Wellington Opera House in September 1974.

The guitarist joined Dragon in December 1974 after that group had recorded their second album, Scented Gardens for the Blind (1975). With Taylor on board, the group "eschewed the art-rock trappings for raunchier dance music." His first songwriting credit for the group, "Education", was issued as a non-album single in early 1975, but it did not chart. The band relocated to Sydney, Australia in May 1975. Another Taylor-penned track, "Wait Until Tomorrow", was recorded as their next single, by ex-pat New Zealander Peter Dawkins, who had signed the group to CBS. It had previously been recorded by Taylor with Mammal. Dragon's rendition "made little impression on the charts".

Taylor provided the "powerful two-chord riff" that underlies their first top ten hit "April Sun in Cuba" (November 1977). He was a co-author of the compositions "Education", "Blacktown Boogie", "Street Between Your Feet" and "Magic". After Dragon's first breakup in 1979, Taylor participated in the successful 1982 reunion, which resulted in the album Body and the Beat (1984) and the related single "Rain", which reached number 2 on the Australian chart. Taylor participated in the recording of their acoustic album Incarnations (1995) and reunited with former bandmates on stage when the band was inducted into the ARIA Hall of Fame in 2008. He was also honoured when Dragon was inducted into the New Zealand Music Hall of Fame in 2011.

== Personal life and death ==
Taylor married Carol, and the couple had two children. He died in Sydney on 4 November 2025, at the age of 74. His death was announced by former Dragon drummer, Kerry Jacobson.

== Awards and achievements ==
- ARIA Hall of Fame (2008) – for his contribution to the music of the band Dragon.
- New Zealand Music Hall of Fame (2011) – for his participation in the creation of Dragon songs.

== Discography ==
=== With Mammal ===
- Beware the Man (by Mammal and Sam Hunt) (1972) Red Rat Records
- "Wait" / "Whisper" (1973)

=== With Dragon ===
==== Albums ====
Year	Title	Label	Catalogue No.	Peak chart position	
Year	Title	Label	Catalogue No.	AUS	NZ
1977	Sunshine	CBS, Portrait	SBP234946; JR35068	24	—
1977	Running Free	Portrait, CBS	6	16	
1978	O Zambezi	Portrait	PR33010	3	17
1979	Power Play	CBS	SBP237352	64	—
1984	Body and the Beat	Polydor	817874–1	5	—
1995	Incarnations	Roadshow Music	14251–2	55	—

==== Singles ====
Year	Title	Album	Label	Peak chart position	
Year	Title	Album	Label	AUS	NZ
1975	"Education"	Single only release	Vertigo	—	—
1975	"Star Kissed"	Single only release	Vertigo	—	—
1976	"Wait Until Tomorrow"	Single only release	CBS, Portrait	—	—
1976	"This Time"	Sunshine	CBS, Portrait	26	—
1977	"Get that Jive"	Sunshine	CBS, Portrait	13	—
1977	"Sunshine"	Sunshine	CBS, Portrait	36	—
1977	"April Sun in Cuba"	Running Free	CBS, Portrait	2	9
1977	"Konkaroo"	Running Free	CBS, Portrait	40	—
1978	"Are You Old Enough?"	O Zambezi	Portrait	1	5
1978	"Still in Love with You"	O Zambezi	Portrait	27	35
1979	"Love's Not Enough"	Single only release	CBS	37	—
1982	"Ramona"	Single only release	Polydor	79	—
1983	"Rain"	Body and the Beat	Polydor	2	—
