= Snake Eyes on the Paradise Greatest Hits 1976–1989 =

Greatest hits album by Dragon
- Released: 1998
- Recorded: 1976–1989
- Genre: Rock
- Length: 1:18:13
- Label: Raven Records
- Producer: Peter Dawkins

Dragon chronology
Incarnations (1995)	Snake Eyes on the Paradise Greatest Hits 1976–1989 (1998)	Tales From the Dark Side Greatest Hits and Choice Collectables 1974-1997 (1998)

Snake Eyes on the Paradise Greatest Hits 1976–1989 is a compilation album by rock music group, Dragon, released in 1998. This is the single disc version - there is also a two-disc version called Tales from the Dark Side Greatest Hits and Choice Collectables 1974–1997, which has this disc plus a second disc of album tracks, live, b-sides and other rarities. The album charted at number 70 on the ARIA Charts.

== Reception ==
Professional ratings
Review scores
Source	Rating
AllMusic	4.5/5 stars

Adrian Zupp from AllMusic said Dragon were "a hell of a good one when they put their minds to it", adding "in the studio... they crafted some great music. Snake Eyes on the Paradise captures the best of it. A 21-track set, this disc offers excellent coverage of the band's recording history and varying lineups while placing emphasis on their peak period from the 1970s and their renaissance in the early 1980s. The early stuff in particular -- April Sun in Cuba, Are You Old Enough?, Still in Love With You, et al is comprised of prototypical singalong, but like all of the material here, it's memorable without being simplistic or 'disposable'; you know you're listening to a band that can both write and play with aplomb." Zupp added, "The melodies are ear-grabbing, the hooks sharp, and the musicianship tight as a noose. This disc is a superb tribute to a band that was as unique as it was inherently troubled, a document of a skilled and passionate group that swaggered its way into the folklore of down under rock. Released just after the passing of charis-nihilistic frontman Marc Hunter in 1998 -- the third member of the band to die before his time -- Snake Eyes has a haunting poignancy. From the days when artistic integrity and radio-readiness weren't mutually exclusive, this one recommends itself."

== Track listing ==
1. "This Time" (Marc Hunter, Neil Storey, Paul Hewson, Robert Taylor, Todd Hunter) - 3:09
2. "Get that Jive" (Paul Hewson) - 2:47
3. "Sunshine" (Paul Hewson) - 4:49
4. "April Sun in Cuba" (Marc Hunter, Paul Hewson) - 3:29
5. "Konkaroo" (Paul Hewson) - 3:29
6. "Are You Old Enough?" (Paul Hewson) - 4:08
7. "Still in Love With You" (Paul Hewson) - 3:27
8. "Love's Not Enough" (Paul Hewson) - 3:36
9. "Island Nights" (by Marc Hunter) (Sammy Egorin, Tony Scuito) - 3:15
10. "Ramona" (Paul Hewson) - 3:39
11. "Rain" (Johanna Pigott, Marc Hunter, Todd Hunter) - 3:40
12. "Magic" (Marc Hunter, Robert Taylor) - 3:57
13. "Cry" (Todd Hunter) - 3:43
14. "Wilderworld" (Johanna Pigott, Marc Hunter, Todd Hunter) - 3:50
15. "Speak No Evil" (Alan Mansfield, Johanna Pigott, Todd Hunter) - 4:00
16. "Dreams of Ordinary Men" (Alan Mansfield, Doane Perry, Johanna Pigott, Todd Hunter, Todd Rundgren) - 4:02
17. "Western Girls" (Alan Mansfield, Marc Hunter, Sharon O'Neill, Todd Rundgren) - 4:07
18. "Celebration" (Kool & the Gang, Ronald Bell) - 3:56
19. "River" (Todd Hunter) - 3:27
20. "Young Years" (Alan Mansfield, Sharon O'Neill) - 3:59
21. "Summer" (David Hirschfelder, Marc Hunter, Wendy Hunter) - 3:38

== Personnel ==
- Todd Hunter – bass guitar, vocals
- Marc Hunter – vocals
- Alan Mansfield – keyboards
- Jeffrey Bartolomei – keyboards
- Tommy Emmanuel – guitar
- Terry Chambers – drums
- David Hirschfelder – keyboards
- Mike Caen - guitar

== Charts ==
Chart (1998)	Peak position
Australia (ARIA Charts)	70

== Notes ==
14 page colour booklet contains biography, various band line-ups and credits
