= Sunshine to Rain =

Studio album by Dragon
- Released: 27 June 2006
- Recorded: Electric Avenue Studios, Axle Studio, Cambewarra
- Genre: Pop rock
- Length: 69:46
- Label: Liberation Blue
- Producer: Todd Hunter, Warren Costello, Brent Clark

Dragon chronology
Tales from the Dark Side Greatest Hits and Choice Collectables 1974–1997 (1998)	Sunshine to Rain (2006)	The Essential Dragon (2007)

Sunshine to Rain is the eleventh studio album by New Zealand-Australian band, Dragon. The band reformed featuring Mark Williams on vocals. The album was released on 27 June 2006 and is their first since 1995's Incarnations. The album debuted and peaked at number 87 on the ARIA Charts. The album release was followed with a tour.

== Track listing ==
1. "Sunshine" (Paul Hewson) – 5:00
2. "Speak No Evil" (Alan Mansfield, Johanna Pigott, Todd Hunter) – 4:02
3. "April Sun in Cuba" (Marc Hunter, Paul Hewson) – 3:47
4. "Are You Old Enough?" (Paul Hewson) – 4::43
5. "Body and the Beat" (Marc Hunter Robert Taylor) – 3:14
6. "Wilderworld" (Johanna Pigott, Marc Hunter, Todd Hunter) – 3:56
7. "Still in Love with You" (Paul Hewson) – 3:19
8. "Dreams of Ordinary Men" (Alan Mansfield, Doane Perry, Johanna Pigott, Todd Hunter, Todd Rundgren) – 4:24
9. "Get that Jive" (Paul Hewson) – 4:01
10. "Magic" (Marc Hunter, Robert Taylor) – 4:14
11. "Age of Reason" (Todd Hunter, Johanna Pigott) – 5:03
12. "Promises" (Johanna Pigott, Marc Hunter, Todd Hunter) – 4:16
13. "This Time" (Marc Hunter, Neil Storey, Paul Hewson, Robert Taylor, Todd Hunter) – 2:59
14. "Young Years" (Alan Mansfield, Sharon O'Neill) – 3:45
15. "Celebration" (Kool & the Gang, Ronald Bell) – 4:05
16. "Rain" (Johanna Pigott, Marc Hunter, Todd Hunter) – 4:21
17. "Age of Reason" (reprise) – 4:37

== Charts ==
Chart (2006)	Position
Australian ARIA Charts	87

== Release history ==
Region	Date	Format	Edition(s)	Label	Catalogue
Australia	27 June 2006	CD; digital download	Standard	Liberation Blue	BLUE0902
