= Are You Old Enough (album) =

Compilation album by Dragon
- Released: 1983
- Recorded: 1976–1978
- Genre: Rock
- Length: 59:41
- Label: K-tel
- Producer: Peter Dawkins

Dragon chronology
Power Play (1979)	Are You Old Enough (1983)	Body and the Beat (1984)

Are You Old Enough (subtitled 16 of the Very Best) is a compilation album by New Zealand group Dragon, released in 1983 through budget label K-tel (NA 662). The album includes all tracks from the 1979 LP Dragon's Greatest Hits Vol. 1 and adds six album tracks from the group's tenure with the Portrait label, while omitting the top 40 single "Love's Not Enough" or any tracks from Power Play which did not feature Marc Hunter as vocalist.

The album was released when Dragon's hit single "Rain" was in the top 5 in Australia.

== Track listing ==
Side A

1. "Are You Old Enough?" (Paul Hewson) – 4:08
2. "This Time" (Marc Hunter, Neil Storey, Paul Hewson; Robert Taylor, Todd Hunter) – 3:10
3. "Get that Jive" (Paul Hewson) – 2:45
4. "Sunshine" (Paul Hewson) – 4:53
5. "Konkaroo" (Paul Hewson) – 3:26
6. "Politics" (Jenny Hunter-Brown, Robert Taylor, Todd Hunter) – 3:58
7. "The Dreaded Moroczy Bind" (Marc Hunter, Neil Storey, Paul Hewson; Robert Taylor, Todd Hunter) – 3:25
8. "Same Old Blues" (Hewson) – 4:54

Side B

1. "April Sun in Cuba" (Marc Hunter, Paul Hewson) – 3:27
2. "Still in Love With You" (Paul Hewson) – 3:26
3. "Wait Until Tomorrow" (Robert Taylor) – 3:25
4. "O Zambezi" (Robert Taylor) – 4:30
5. "Blacktown Boogie" (Marc Hunter, Robert M. Taylor, Todd Hunter) – 3:15
6. "Company" (Jenny Hunter-Brown, Todd Hunter) – 3:55
7. "Burn Down the Bridges" (Marc Hunter) – 3:23
8. "Shooting Stars" (Paul Hewson) – 3:31

== Personnel ==
- Bass guitar, vocals – Todd Hunter
- Drums – Kerry Jacobson
- Guitar, vocals – Robert Taylor
- Keyboards, vocals – Paul Hewson
- Vocals – Marc Hunter
