= So Far (Dragon album) =

Compilation album by Dragon
- Released: January 1988
- Recorded: 1976–1986
- Genre: Rock, pop rock
- Label: J&B Records

Dragon chronology
Dreams of Ordinary Men (1986)	So Far (1988)	Bondi Road (1989)

So Far (subtitled Their Classic Collection') is a compilation album by New Zealand group Dragon, released in January 1988 through J&B Records (JB 325), under licence from CBS Records and PolyGram Records. The album was released as the band's cover version of Kool & The Gang's "Celebration" was in the top 20 in Australia, on the RCA Records label.

So Far peaked at number 26 on the Australian Kent Music Report.

== Track listing ==
Side A

1. "April Sun in Cuba" (Marc Hunter, Paul Hewson) – 3:27
2. "Still in Love With You" (Paul Hewson) – 3:26
3. "Get that Jive" (Paul Hewson) – 2:45
4. "Are You Old Enough?" (Paul Hewson) – 4:08
5. "O Zambezi" (Robert Taylor) – 4:30
6. "Rain" (Johanna Pigott, Marc Hunter, Todd Hunter) – 3:40
7. "Speak No Evil" (Alan Mansfield, Johanna Pigott, Todd Hunter) – 4:00
8. "Fool" (Johanna Pigott, Todd Hunter) – 3:31

Side B

1. "Dreams of Ordinary Men" (Alan Mansfield, Doane Perry, Johanna Pigott, Todd Hunter, Todd Rundgren) – 4:02
2. "Western Girls" (Alan Mansfield, Marc Hunter, Sharon O'Neill, Todd Rundgren) – 4:07
3. "Body and the Beat" (Marc Hunter, Robert Taylor) – 4:26
4. "Magic" (Marc Hunter, Robert Taylor) – 3:57
5. "Burn Down the Bridges" (Marc Hunter) – 3:23
6. "Promises" (Johanna Pigott, Marc Hunter, Todd Hunter) – 4:11
7. "Company" (Jenny Hunter-Brown, Todd Hunter) – 3:55
8. "Konkaroo" (Paul Hewson) – 3:26

== Charts ==
Chart (1988)	Peak position
Australian Albums (Kent Music Report)	26
