= Dragon's Greatest Hits Vol. 1 =

Dragon's Greatest Hits, Vol. 1

Greatest hits album by Dragon
- Released: April 1979
- Recorded: 1976–1978
- Genre: Rock
- Length: 33:56
- Label: CBS Records, Portrait Records
- Producer: Peter Dawkins

Dragon chronology
O Zambezi (1978)	Dragon's Greatest Hits, Vol. 1 (1979)	Power Play (1979)

Dragon's Greatest Hits Volume 1 is the first greatest hits album by New Zealand group Dragon, released in April 1979 through CBS Records. It includes tracks from the band's three CBS/Portrait albums, Sunshine, Running Free and O Zambezi, as well as three non-album tracks; "Wait Until Tomorrow", "Konkaroo" and "The Dreaded Moroczy Bind". Dragon's Greatest Hits Vol. 1 peaked at number 8 on the Australian Kent Music Report.

== Track listing ==
1. "Wait Until Tomorrow" (Robert Taylor) – 3:25
2. "This Time" (Marc Hunter, Neil Storey, Paul Hewson; Robert Taylor, Todd Hunter) – 3:10
3. "Get that Jive" (Paul Hewson) – 2:45
4. "Sunshine" (Paul Hewson) – 4:53
5. "Konkaroo" (Paul Hewson) – 3:26
6. "April Sun in Cuba" (Marc Hunter, Paul Hewson) – 3:27
7. "Shooting Stars" (Paul Hewson) – 3:31
8. "Are You Old Enough?" (Paul Hewson) – 4:08
9. "Still in Love With You" (Paul Hewson) – 3:26
10. "The Dreaded Moroczy Bind" (Marc Hunter, Neil Storey, Paul Hewson; Robert Taylor, Todd Hunter) – 3:25

== Charts ==
Chart (1979)	Peak position
Australian Albums (Kent Music Report)	8

== Personnel ==
- Bass guitar, vocals – Todd Hunter
- Drums – Kerry Jacobson
- Guitar, vocals – Robert Taylor
- Keyboards, vocals – Paul Hewson
- Producer – Peter Dawkins
- Vocals – Marc Hunter
