= Cuts from the Tough Times =

Compilation album by Dragon
- Released: 1990
- Recorded: 1983–1986
- Genre: Rock, pop rock
- Label: Polydor Records

Dragon chronology
The Best of Dragon and Mondo Rock (1990)	Cuts from the Tough Times (1990)	Incarnations (1995)

Cuts from the Tough Times is a compilation album by New Zealand group Dragon, released in January 1990 through Polydor Records. The album comprised all the tracks from their 1984 album, "Body and the Beat" and a selection of tracks from their 1986 album, "Dreams of Ordinary Men". The album has been re-released numerous times.

== Track listing ==
1. "Rain" (Johanna Pigot, Marc Hunter, Todd Hunter) – 3:33
2. "Dreams of Ordinary Men " (Alan Mansfield, Doane Perry, Johanna Pigott, Todd Hunter, Todd Rundgren) – 4:02
3. "Speak No Evil" (Alan Mansfield, Johanna Pigott, Todd Hunter) – 3:34
4. "Western Girls" (Alan Mansfield, Marc Hunter, Sharon O'Neill, Todd Rundgren) – 4:10
5. "Promises" (Johanna Pigott, Marc Hunter, Todd Hunter) – 4:11
6. "Wilderworld" (Johanna Pigott, Marc Hunter, Todd Hunter) – 3:51
7. "Cry" (Todd Hunter) – 3:44
8. "Cool Down" (Alan Mansfield, Todd Hunter) – 4:21
9. "Body And The Beat" (Marc Hunter, Robert Taylor) – 4:26
10. "Witnessing" (Marc Hunter, Todd Hunter) – 4:39
11. "Magic" (Robert Taylor) – 3:57
12. "What Am I Gonna Do?" (Alan Mansfield, Kerry Jacobson, Robert Taylor, Paul Hewson, Todd Hunter) – 3:41
13. "Fool" (Johanna Pigott, Todd Hunter) – 3:31
14. "Start It Up" (Alan Mansfield, Doane Perry, Johanna Pigott, Todd Hunter, Todd Rundgren) – 4:20
15. "Smoke" (Johanna Pigott, Marc Hunter, Todd Hunter) – 4:42

== Release history ==
Region	Date	Format	Label	Catalogue
Australia / New Zealand	1990	CD	Polydor Records	843 257–2
Australia	16 September 1996	CD	Polydor Records	9399084325729
United States/ United Kingdom	12 November 2002	CD, Digital Download	Universal Music Australia	9399084325729
Australia	1 October 2005	CD	Universal Music Australia	8432572
Australia	2010	Digital Download	Universal Music Australia	365752557
