= Incarnations (album) =

Studio album by Dragon
- Released: 1995
- Recorded: EMI Studios 301, Sydney
- Genre: Pop rock
- Length: 62:24
- Label: Roadshow Entertainment
- Producer: Dragon

Dragon chronology
Cuts from the Tough Times (1990)	Incarnations (1995)	Snake Eyes on the Paradise Greatest Hits 1976–1989 (1998)

Singles from Incarnations
- 1. "Chains of Love" Released: 1995

Incarnations is the tenth studio album by New Zealand-Australian band, Dragon. The album was released in 1995. and is an acoustic album of their previously released material. It was their final studio album for eleven years, their last before their second split in 1997 and their last to feature Marc Hunter before his death in 1998.

== Track listing ==
1. "Are You Old Enough?" (Paul Hewson)
2. "Chains of Love" (Marc Hunter, Mark McDuff)
3. "Rain" (Johanna Pigott, Marc Hunter, Todd Hunter)
4. "Come Together" (Johanna Pigott, Todd Hunter)
5. "O Zambezi" (Robert Taylor)
6. "Oh Now Girl" (Marc Hunter, Todd Hunter)
7. "April Sun in Cuba" (Marc Hunter, Paul Hewson)
8. "Body and the Beat" (Marc Hunter Robert Taylor)
9. "Wish It Would Rain" (Marc Hunter, Mark McDuff, Scott Christie)
10. "Young Years" (Alan Mansfield, Sharon O'Neill)
11. "Still in Love with You" (Paul Hewson)
12. "Speak No Evil" (Alan Mansfield, Johanna Pigott, Todd Hunter)
13. "Requiem" (Johanna Pigott, Todd Hunter)
