= Are You Old Enough =

Are You Old Enough may refer to:

- "Are You Old Enough?", a 1978 song by Dragon
- Are You Old Enough (album), a 1983 compilation album by Dragon
