= Power Play (Dragon album) =

Studio album by Dragon
- Released: September 1979
- Studio: EMI Studios 301, Sydney
- Genre: Rock
- Length: 36:59
- Label: CBS Records
- Producer: Peter Dawkins

Dragon chronology
Dragon's Greatest Hits Vol. 1 (1979)	Power Play (1979)	Are You Old Enough (1983)

Singles from Power Play
- 1. "Motor City Connection" Released: September 1979; 2. "Counting Sheep" Released: October 1979

Power Play is the sixth studio album recorded by Australian-New Zealand group Dragon, released in September 1979. It was the group's first album without their iconic singer Marc Hunter although arguably it was the lack of support from the group's label, rather than a decline in quality of the group's output, that accounted for its poor commercial performance: Power Play peaked at number 64 on the Australian Kent Music Report. It was the group's final studio album for five years; they split up in December 1979. Unlike other Dragon albums from the 1970s, it has not been reissued on CD, except as a bootleg; notwithstanding that Dragon in its current form has been playing for over a decade with Mark Williams as singer, Power Play appears to be regarded as 'non-canon' amongst the group's records.

The cover of the album refers to fourth album Running Free, the new line-up of the group depicted on the front cover; the back cover reveals they hold weapons behind their backs.

== Track listing ==
1. Motor City Connection (Jenny Hunter-Brown, Todd Hunter) – 3:50
2. Counting Sheep (Billy Rogers, Paul Hewson) – 3:41
3. Crying Shame (J. Hunter-Brown, T. Hunter) – 3:12
4. Bus Stop (Robert Taylor) – 3:16
5. Time Of The Year (Billy Rogers, Paul Hewson) – 4:09
6. Gans En Farben (B. Rogers, Kerry Jacobson, Richard Lee, Robert Taylor, T. Hunter, P. Hewson) – 3:09
7. Crooked Highway (P. Hewson) – 4:31
8. For Free (R. Taylor) – 4:19
9. 3:33 (J. Hunter-Brown, T. Hunter) – 3:00
10. Same Old Lies (B. Rogers, R. Taylor) – 3:52

== Charts ==
Chart (1979)	Peak position
Australian Albums (Kent Music Report)	64

== Personnel ==
- Bass, vocals – Todd Hunter
- Drums – Kerry Jacobson
- Guitar, vocals – Robert Taylor
- Keyboards, vocals – Paul Hewson
- Saxophone, lead vocals – Billy Rogers
- Synthesizer – Murray Burns
- Violin [Electric Violin] – Richard Lee

== Production ==
- Peter Dawkins – producer
- Howard Steele – engineer
- Dave Marett – assistant engineer
- Richard Dunn – cover
- Photography by Graeme Webber – photography
- Greg Penniket – photography
