= Shooting Stars (Dragon song) =

Single by Dragon

from the album Running Free
- Released: January 1978
- Genre: Rock
- Length: 3:30
- Label: Portrait Records
- Songwriter(s): Paul Hewson
- Producer(s): Peter Dawkins

Dragon singles chronology
"April Sun in Cuba" (1977)	"Shooting Stars" (1978)	"Konkaroo" (1978)

"Shooting Stars" is a song by New Zealand band Dragon, released in January 1978 as the second and final single to be released from Dragon's fourth studio album, Running Free (1977).

== Composition ==
Songwriter Hewson said, "Everybody went out for lunch so I sat at the piano and came up with it. On the original demo tape Marc Hunter plays drums, Robert Taylor is on bass, and I sang - dreadfully but with feeling."

== Track listing ==
1. Shooting Stars (Paul Hewson) - 3:30
2. Some Strange Dream (Todd Hunter) - 3:15

== Charts ==
Chart (1977/78)	Peak position
Australian Kent Music Report	58

== Personnel ==
- Bass – Todd Hunter
- Guitar – Robert Taylor
- Keyboards – Paul Hewson
- Lead Vocals – Marc Hunter
- Percussion – Kerry Jacobson
- Vocals – Paul Hewson, Robert Taylor, Todd Hunter
