= Universal Radio =

Studio album by Dragon
- Released: June 1974
- Recorded: February 1974
- Studios: Stebbing Studios, Auckland
- Genre: Progressive rock
- Length: 48:02
- Labels: Vertigo, TRC, Aztec
- Producer: Rick Shadwell

Dragon chronology
Universal Radio (1974)	Scented Gardens for the Blind (1975)

Universal Radio is the debut album by the New Zealand group Dragon, released in June 1974 on Vertigo Records and produced by Rick Shadwell. Universal Radio, along with their second album Scented Gardens for the Blind are in the progressive rock genre—all subsequent albums are hard rock/pop rock.

On 2 July 2009, Aztec Music reissued Universal Radio with extensive liner notes, rare photos, and three bonus tracks. The first bonus track is a live recording from 1974 of their cover version of Fleetwood Mac's "Black Magic Woman", while the last two, "X-Ray Creature" and "Dinghy Days" are the A-side and B-side of Marc Hunter's first solo single released in 1973.

== Track listing ==
=== 1974 Vertigo ===
Side 1

1. "Universal Radio" (Goodwin, M. Hunter, Thompson, Storey, T. Hunter) - 8:33
2. "Going Slow" (T Hunter) - 6:16
3. "Patina" (Goodwin, (Break Dragon)) - 11:47

Side 2

4. "Weetbix" (Goodwin, T Hunter, Bedgegood, Abbot) - 2:55
5. "Graves" (Goodwin, T Hunter, Reynolds, Thompson) - 6:56
6. "Avalanche" (Goodwin, T Hunter, Reynolds, Thompson) - 11:08

=== 2009 Aztec Music reissue ===
7. "Black Magic Woman" (Peter Green) - 6:38
8. "X-Ray Creature" (Graeme Collins, A Baysting) - 3:06
9. "Dinghy Days" (T Hunter) - 3:33

== Liner notes ==
=== 1974 Vertigo ===
- Universal Radio was recorded at Stebbings Studio, Auckland (late February 1974)
- Produced by Rick Shadwell
- Engineered by Tony Moan
- "X-Ray Creature" b/w "Dinghy Days" was recorded at Mascot Recording Studios, Auckland (May 1973)
- Engineered by Gary Potts

Dragon:

- Ivan Thompson – organ, piano, Moog synthesiser
- Ray Goodwin – guitars, vocals
- Marc Hunter – vocals, percussion
- Neil Storey – drums
- Todd Hunter – bass, vocals

Dragon thanks

- Paul Crowther for Moog
- Tony for Fender Rhodes
- All songs by Dragon
- Liner and cover art by Dick Frizzell

=== 2009 Aztec Music Reissue ===
Additional musicians

- Graeme Collins – piano on "X-Ray Creature" (Collins was a founding member of Dragon but had left before Universal Radio was recorded)
- Herb Mann – lead guitar on "Dinghy Days"
