= Scented Gardens for the Blind =

Studio album by Dragon
- Released: February 1975
- Recorded: December 1974
- Studios: Stebbing Studios, Auckland
- Genre: Progressive rock
- Length: 37:35
- Labels: Vertigo, TRC
- Producer: Rick Shadwell

Dragon chronology
Universal Radio (1974)	Scented Gardens for the Blind (1975)	Sunshine (1977)

Singles from Scented Gardens for the Blind
- 1. "Vermillion Cellars" Released: March 1975

Scented Gardens for the Blind is the second album by New Zealand group Dragon released in February 1975 on Vertigo Records before they relocated to Australia in May. Scented Gardens for the Blind, along with their first album Universal Radio, is in the progressive rock genre—all subsequent albums are hard rock/pop rock. "Vermillion Cellars" was released as a single in March and was followed by non-album singles, "Education" in May and "Star Kissed" in August but neither albums nor singles had any local chart success.

The album's title presumably comes from that of New Zealand author Janet Frame's award-winning fourth novel, published in 1963.

== Background ==
Dragon formed in Auckland, New Zealand, in January 1972 with a line-up that featured Todd Hunter on bass guitar, Graeme Collins on vocals, guitarist Ray Goodwin, drummer Neil Reynolds and Ivan Thompson on keyboards. All had previously been in various short-lived bands in Auckland. Graeme Collins is credited with using I Ching to provide the name Dragon. Their first major gig was an appearance at The Great Ngaruawahia Music Festival in early January 1973. By 1974 several personnel changes had occurred including Collins leaving, with Todd Hunter's younger brother Marc Hunter joining on vocals and Neil Storey on drums. The band released two progressive rock albums, Universal Radio in June 1974 and Scented Gardens for the Blind in March 1975, both on Vertigo Records. Scented Gardens for the Blind was released in New Zealand, France and Australia.

"Vermillion Cellars" was released as a single in March and was followed by a non-album single, "Education" in May, written by new guitarist Robert Taylor. Despite being New Zealand's top live attraction by late 1974, neither albums nor singles had any local chart success, and the recruitment of Taylor (ex-Mammal) on guitar had taken place in pursuit of a raunchier pop sound. By early 1975, manager Graeme Nesbitt (ex-Mammal), who had obtained regular gigs and organized their first New Zealand tours, felt they should tackle the larger Australian market. Nesbitt was unable to travel with them to Australia — he had been arrested for selling drugs — and they relocated in May. Once in Australia, they released another non-album single, "Star Kissed", written by Ray Goodwin, in August.

Dragon's first two albums had been available in bootleg versions in Europe beginning with a 1990 release by the German label Twilight Tone. In June 2023 Scented Gardens... was rereleased on vinyl by Replica/MUSEA. The album is also available on Spotify packaged with the abovementioned singles.

Scented Gardens for the Blind is the last full Dragon album to feature drummer Neil Storey, who died in September 1976. Storey does appear on one track - the group's first hit single, "This Time" - on their third album, Sunshine.

== Track listing ==
Side A

1. "Vermillion Cellars" (Marc Hunter, Todd Hunter, Ray Goodwin) – 3:23
2. "La Gash Lagoon" a.k.a. "L'Gash Lagoon" (M. Hunter, T. Hunter, Goodwin) – 8:18
3. "Sunburst" (Goodwin, T. Hunter, M. Hunter) – 8:33

Side B

4. "Greylynn Candy" a.k.a. "Grey Lynn Candy" (Goodwin, T. Hunter) – 4:57
5. "Darkness" (M. Hunter, T. Hunter, Goodwin) – 4:44
6. "Scented Gardens for the Blind" (M. Hunter, T. Hunter, Goodwin) – 7:40

Grey Lynn is a suburb of Auckland.

== Personnel ==
Dragon

- Marc Hunter – saxophone, percussion, vocals; lead vocals (tracks 2–4, 6)
- Ray Goodwin – guitars, vocals; lead vocals (tracks 1, 5)
- Ivan Thompson – keyboards
- Todd Hunter – bass, backing vocals
- Neil Storey – drums

Additional personnel

- "Josie" – background vocals
- Recorded at Stebbings Studio Auckland Dec 1974
- Engineer – Tony Moan
- Produced by Rick Shadwell for Marmalade Productions
- Cover design and artwork Super Graphics Ltd
