= Roses (Dragon album) =

Studio album by Dragon
- Released: 14 September 2014
- Genre: Pop rock
- Length: 41:00
- Label: Ozmo Music

Dragon chronology
The Dragon Years (2013)	Roses (2014)

Roses is the fifteenth studio album by New Zealand band Dragon. The album was released digitally on 14 September 2014.

Band member Todd Hunter said; “We held a band camp at my studio and spent a week writing songs. It was just the right atmosphere to let the creative juices flow. We hung around the pool and relaxed. It produced great results.” adding “We are not afraid to fail. We try all sorts of material until we find what’s right for us".

The album was launched at The Basement, Sydney. The album marks the 10th release from the band's current incarnation and the launch will be their 600th show since they reformed in 2006.

== Track listing ==
1. "Silver Dome Sky" – 3:41
2. "Don't Wait for Tomorrow" – 3:40
3. "Love That's Strong" – 4:01
4. "Roses" – 3:14
5. "Hey Hey" – 2:41
6. "Going Down" – 4:04
7. "Alice Pan" – 2:54
8. "Random Stranger" – 3:53
9. "Go" – 3:04
10. "All for Love" – 2:58
11. "High" – 3:26
12. "Little More Than Dust" – 3:40

== Personnel ==
- Todd Hunter – bass, vocals
- Mark Williams – lead vocals, acoustic guitar
- Bruce Reid – guitar
- Pete Drummond – drums, vocals, keyboards, percussion
