= Ramona (Dragon song) =

Single by Dragon
- A-side: "Ramona"
- B-side: "Blacktown Boogie"
- Released: October 1982
- Genre: Rock
- Length: 3:40
- Label: EMI Records
- Songwriter(s): Paul Hewson

Dragon singles chronology
"Motor City Connections" (1979)	"Ramona" (1982)	"Rain" (1983)

"Ramona" is a song by Australian-New Zealand band Dragon released in October 1982. The song was Dragon's first and only single to be released on the EMI Music label. The song peaked at number 79 on the Australian Kent Music Report.

It is included on the band's 1998 album, Snake Eyes on the Paradise Greatest Hits 1976–1989

== Track listing ==
7" (EMI-875)

1. "Ramona" (Paul Hewson) - 3:40
2. "Blacktown Boogie" (Robert Taylor, Marc Hunter, Todd Hunter) - 3:15

== Charts ==
Chart (1982)	Peak position
Australian Kent Music Report	79
