= It's All Too Beautiful =

Studio album by Dragon
- Released: 2 February 2011
- Studio: Linear Studios, Sydney Australia
- Genre: Rock
- Length: 39:07
- Label: Ozmo Music

Dragon chronology
The Very Best of Dragon (2010)	It's All Too Beautiful (2011)	Chase the Sun (2011)

It's All Too Beautiful is the fourteenth studio album by New Zealand band, Dragon. The album was recorded live in the studio.

It pays tribute to songs from the British Invasion of the 1960s.

The album was released on 2 February 2011.

Dragon promoted the album with a British Invasion Tour throughout 2011.

On 1 April 2011 the band recorded a "Live at the Linear DVD", which was uploaded onto YouTube in 2014.

== Track listing ==
Standard edition
No.	Title	Writer(s)	Length
1.	"In My Life"	Lennon–McCartney	2:36
2.	"Bus Stop"	Graham Gouldman	3:16
3.	"Itchycoo Park"	Steve Marriott, Ronnie Lane	2:59
4.	"She's Not There"	Rod Argent	2:47
5.	"Albatross"	Peter Green	3:26
6.	"Waterloo Sunset"	Ray Davies	3:30
7.	"A Girl Like You"	Jerry Lordan	2:28
8.	"Something in the Air"	Speedy Keen	2:28
9.	"When I Was Young"	Eric Burdon, Vic Briggs, John Weider, Barry Jenkins, Danny McCulloch	3:36
10.	"Keep On Running"	Jackie Edwards	3:02
11.	"Fire"	Arthur Brown, Vincent Crane, Mike Finesilver, Peter Ker	2:53
12.	"A Day in the Life"	Lennon–McCartney	4:33

== Personnel ==
- Todd Hunter – bass, vocals
- Mark Williams – lead vocals, acoustic guitar, keyboards
- Bruce Reid – guitar, vocals
- Pete Drummond – drums, vocals, mandolin, melodica, keyboards, percussion
