= River (Dragon song) =

Single by Dragon
- Released: 30 May 1988
- Genre: Rock
- Length: 6:32 (12 Alluvial Mudmix); 3:34 (7 version)
- Label: RCA
- Songwriter(s): Todd Hunter
- Producer(s): David Hirschfelder

Dragon singles chronology
"Celebration" (1987)	"River" (1988)	"Young Years" (1989)

"River" is a song by New Zealand-Australian rock band Dragon, released in May 1988. It was released as a non-album single but later appeared on Dragon's compilation album, Snake Eyes on the Paradise Greatest Hits 1976–1989. The song peaked at number 81 on the Australian ARIA Singles Chart.

== Track listing ==
1. "River" (12" Alluvial Mudmix) (Todd Hunter) - 6:32
2. "River" (7" version) (Todd Hunter) - 3:34
3. "Bottom to the Top" (Alan Mansfield, Marc Hunter, Todd Hunter) - 4:47

== Charts ==
Chart (1988)	Peak position
Australia (ARIA)	81

== Personnel ==
- Marc Hunter – vocals
- Todd Hunter – bass guitar, vocals
- Lee Borkman – keyboards
- John Watson – drums
- Tommy Emmanuel – guitar
- Doane Perry – drums
- David Hirschfelder – keyboards
