= Love's Not Enough =

Single by Dragon
- Released: April 1979
- Genre: Rock
- Length: 3:36
- Label: CBS Records
- Songwriter: Paul Hewson
- Producer: Peter Dawkins

Dragon singles chronology
"Still in Love with You" (1978)	"Love's Not Enough" (1979)	"Counting Sheep" (1979)

"Love's Not Enough" is a song by New Zealand band Dragon, released in April 1979 as a non-album single, but later to appear on the compilation album Snake Eyes on the Paradise Greatest Hits 1976–1989. The single charted at number 37 on the Australian Kent Music Report. It was the group's first release without Marc Hunter; he had been replaced by Billy Rogers and Richard Lee. Lee had played on a previous Dragon single, "Are you Old Enough". "Love's Not Enough" had been popular in Dragon's live repertoire prior to Hunter's departure. The b-side of the single, "Four Short Solos" was contrived to give drummer Kerry Jacobson and new members Rogers and Lee some songwriting royalties on a release that the group expected would be a major hit.

== Track listing ==
1. Love's Not Enough (Paul Hewson) - 3:36
2. Four Short Solos (Kerry Jacobson, Richard Lee, Billy Rogers) - 3:22

== Charts ==
Chart (1979)	Peak position
Australian Kent Music Report	37

== Personnel ==
- Bass, vocals – Todd Hunter
- Drums – Kerry Jacobson
- Guitar, vocals – Robert Taylor
- Keyboards, vocals – Paul Hewson
- Saxophone, lead vocals – Billy Rogers
- Synthesizer – Murray Burns
- Electric violin – Richard Lee
