= Dreams of Ordinary Men =

Studio album by Dragon
- Released: August 1986
- Genre: Rock
- Length: 49:04
- Label: Polydor Records
- Producer: Todd Rundgren

Dragon chronology
Live One (1985)	Dreams of Ordinary Men (1986)	So Far: Their Classic Collection (1988)

Singles from Dreams of Ordinary Men
- 1. "Speak No Evil" Released: February 1985; 2. "Dreams of Ordinary Men" Released: August 1986; 3. "Western Girls" Released: November 1986; 4. "Nothing to Lose" Released: 1987

Dreams of Ordinary Men is the eighth studio album recorded by Australian-New Zealand rock band Dragon. The album was released in August 1986 and peaked at number 18 on the Australian Kent Music Report and was certified platinum in November 1986.

== Track listing ==
Side A

1. "Dreams of Ordinary Men " (Alan Mansfield, Doane Perry, Johanna Pigott, Todd Hunter, Todd Rundgren) - 4:02
2. "Speak No Evil" (Alan Mansfield, Johanna Pigott, Todd Hunter) - 3:34
3. "Nothing to Lose" (Johanna Pigott, Todd Hunter) - 4:20
4. "Western Girls" (Alan Mansfield, Marc Hunter, Sharon O'Neill, Todd Rundgren) - 4:10
5. "Intensive Care" (Alan Mansfield, Marc Hunter) - 4:25

Side B

1. "Temptation" (Alan Mansfield, Johanna Pigott, Todd Hunter) - 4:10
2. "Midnight Sun" (Todd Rundgren) - 3:30
3. "Love Don’t Stop" (Johanna Pigott, Todd Hunter) - 3:42
4. "Forever and Ever" (Alan Mansfield, Johanna Pigott, Todd Hunter) - 3:24
5. "Smoke" (Johanna Pigott, Marc Hunter, Todd Hunter) - 4:42

CD Bonus Tracks

"Start It Up" (Alan Mansfield, Doane Perry, Marc Hunter, Todd Hunter) - 4:20

"When I’m Gone" (Marc Hunter, Martin Briley) - 3:30

== Charts ==
Chart (1986)	Peak position
Australian Albums (Kent Music Report)	18

== Certifications ==
Region	Certification	Certified units/sales
Australia (ARIA)	Platinum	70,000^{^}
^{^} Shipments figures based on certification alone.

== Personnel ==
- Todd Hunter – Bass, vocals
- Marc Hunter – Vocals
- Alan Mansfield – Keyboards
- Doane Perry – Drums

with:

- Tommy Emmanuel – Guitar
- Todd Rundgren – Guitar [additional], backing vocals
- Gary Window, Lenny Pickett - Saxophone

Production

- Management – Stephen White
- Other [Fairlight Cmi Bass] – Todd Hunter
- Photography by – Janette Beckman
- Producer – Todd Rundgren
- Engineer – Chris Andersen, Todd Rundgren
- Remix – Jason Corsaro (tracks: 3 to 6, 8 to 10, 12), Jim Boyer (tracks: 3 to 6, 8 to 10, 12)
- Art direction, design – The Cream Group
