= Kerry Jacobson =

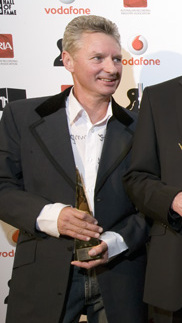
- Jacobson in 2008

Background information
- Born: Kerry Samuel Jacobson; 19 April 1954 (age 72); Wellington, New Zealand
- Genres: Rock, pop, progressive rock
- Occupations: Drummer, songwriter, educator
- Instruments: Drums, percussion
- Years active: 1970s-present
- Labels: Vertigo, CBS, Portrait, Polydor, RCA, J & B, Liberation Music, Mushroom Publishing, Sony Music Australia

Kerry Samuel Jacobson (born 19 April 1954) is a New Zealand musician, educator, ARIA hall of fame inductee and former drummer of rock band Dragon. Jacobson was a member from 1976 to 1983, played at their 30-year reunion and at the 2008 ARIA Hall of Fame in Melbourne, Australia. He continues to write and play with Ian Moss and is the drummer for Mondo Rock and his own band The Filthy Animals.

== Career ==
=== Dragon ===
Kerry Jacobson had been a member of various New Zealand groups including Mammal, Tapestry and Ebony before moving to Australia in 1976 where he joined rock music group, Dragon, on drums. He replaced Neil Storey who had died from an accidental drug overdose. He went on to play with the band until their official break-up in 1979. In 1982 Dragon reformed with its original and most notable line-up, including Jacobson, as they needed to pay off some outstanding debts which had accumulated after their breakup in 1979. After the debt was paid off, the band continued to perform as they enjoyed the limelight again. Feeling exhausted, Jacobson left the band in 1983, after recording the single Rain, to become a session musician. He was then replaced by Terry Chambers from UK band XTC and later Doane Perry from Jethro Tull.

=== Session Career ===
After leaving Dragon in 1983, Jacobson recorded several albums including "Dark Spaces" by Richard Clapton, "Big City Talk" by Marc Hunter and "Shy Boys Shy Girls" by the Kevin Borich Express. He also recorded several tracks on Ian Moss' 2018 album, self-titled Ian Moss, and co-wrote the track "If Another Day (Love Rewards Its Own)".

=== Education ===
In 1990 Jacobson moved to Brisbane where he studied Jazz Drums and Piano at the Conservatorium of Music, earning him a diploma in music.

=== Mondo Rock ===
Jacobson joined Mondo Rock for a brief period of time before leaving the band in 1981. He later rejoined in 2003 to perform in the Hear and Now Tour which toured Australia nationally. He also performed with Mondo Rock at the 2006 Countdown Spectacular and still performs with the band at various outdoor festivals around Australia.

=== Ian Moss ===
Since the 1990s, Jacobson has toured with many different acts, including a European tour with Cold Chisel guitarist Ian Moss. He continues to write and perform with Ian Moss to this day.

=== Other Acts Performed With ===
==== National Acts ====
- Renee Geyer (2006–2010)
- The Black Sorrows (2016)

==== International Acts ====
- The Supremes (USA)
- Canned Heat (USA)
- Eugene "Hideaway" Bridges (USA)
- Shirley Myers (Canada)
- Leo Sayer (UK)

=== Present Day ===
Jacobson is endorsed by Dixon drums, Bosphorus cymbals, Promark drumsticks and Evans drum heads (D'Addario). Jacobson currently teaches percussion at a private school in Brisbane, Australia. He still performs live with Ian Moss, Mondo Rock and many others. He also performs with his own band The Filthy Animals, a classic rock cover band formed during the 2021 COVID-19 lockdown. The band usually plays cover songs at corporate gigs; the band often features, among many others, Kerry Jacobson (Dragon, Mondo Rock, Ian Moss), Brett Williams (The Choirboys), and Glen Muirhead (Eurogliders, James Reyne Band).

== Discography (With Dragon) ==
=== Albums ===
Year	Title	Label	Catalogue No.	Peak chart position	
Year	Title	Label	Catalogue No.	AUS	NZ
1977	Sunshine	CBS; Portrait	SBP234946; JR35068	24	—
1977	Running Free	Portrait; CBS	PR33005; 1989 CD: 465720-2	6	16
1978	O Zambezi	Portrait	PR33010	3	17
1979	Power Play	CBS	SBP237352	64	—
1984	Body and the Beat ("Rain" only)	Polydor	817874-1	5	—
1989	Bondi Road ("Gold in the River" only)	RCA	SFCD0170	18	—

=== Singles ===
Year	Title	Album	Label	Peak chart position	
Year	Title	Album	Label	AUS	NZ
1977	"Get that Jive"	Sunshine	CBS, Portrait	13	—
1977	"Sunshine"	Sunshine	CBS, Portrait	36	—
1977	"April Sun in Cuba"	Running Free	CBS, Portrait	2	9
1977	"Konkaroo"	Running Free	CBS, Portrait	40	—
1978	"Are You Old Enough?"	O Zambezi	Portrait	1	5
1978	"Still in Love with You"	O Zambezi	Portrait	27	35
1979	"Love's not Enough"	Single only release	CBS	37	—
1982	"Ramona"	Single only release	Polydor	79	—
1983	"Rain"	Body and the Beat	Polydor	2	—

== See also ==
- Music in New Zealand

== Awards ==
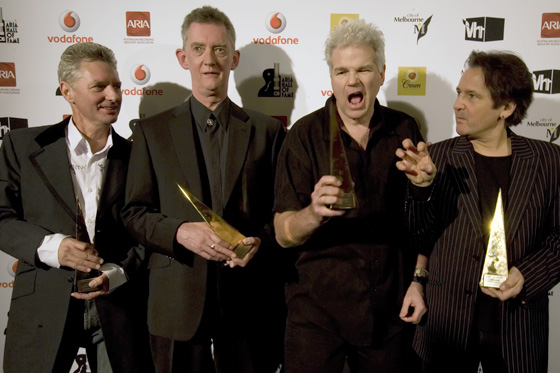
Jacobson on the far left along with the rest of Dragon at the 2008 ARIA Hall of Fame

=== ARIA Awards ===
Kerry Jacobson was inducted into the ARIA Hall of Fame in 2008 for his work with Dragon.

Year	Nominee / work	Award	Result
2008	Dragon	ARIA Hall of Fame	Inducted

=== New Zealand Music Awards ===
Kerry Jacobson was inducted into the New Zealand Music Hall of Fame in 2011 for his work with Dragon.

Year	Nominee / work	Award	Result
2011	Dragon	New Zealand Music Hall of Fame	Inducted
