= O Zambezi =

Studio album by Dragon
- Released: September 1978
- Genre: Pop rock
- Length: 37:55
- Label: Portrait Records
- Producer: Peter Dawkins

Dragon chronology
Running Free (1977)	O Zambezi (1978)	Dragon's Greatest Hits Vol. 1 (1979)

Singles from O Zambezi
- 1. "Are You Old Enough?" Released: 21 August 1978; 2. "Still in Love with You" Released: October 1978

O Zambezi is the fifth studio album by New Zealand rock band, Dragon. It was produced by Peter Dawkins and was released in September 1978 on vinyl and re-released on CD in 1988. The album peaked at number 3 on the Australian Kent Music Report which remains the band's highest charting album in that country. The album was certified platinum in Australia.

In October 2010, the album was listed in the book 100 Best Australian Albums, despite being released by a New Zealand band.

== Track listing ==
1. "O Zambezi" (Robert Taylor) - 4:30
2. "Still in Love with You" (Paul Hewson) - 3:24
3. "Are You Old Enough?" (Paul Hewson) - 4:07
4. "Politics" (Jenny Hunter-Brown, Robert Taylor, Todd Hunter) - 3:58
5. "Reach the Top" (Marc Hunter, Robert Taylor) - 4:04
6. "Civilization" (Paul Hewson) - 3:59
7. "Midnight Groovies" (Paul Hewson) - 3:19
8. "One Look Across the Water" (Robert Taylor) - 3:16
9. "Company" (Jenny Hunter-Brown, Todd Hunter) - 3:55
10. "Burn Down the Bridges" (Marc Hunter) - 3:23

== Charts ==
Chart (1978/79)	Peak position
Australian Albums (Kent Music Report)	3
New Zealand Albums (RMNZ)	17

== Certifications ==
Region	Certification	Certified units/sales
Australia (ARIA)	Platinum	50,000^{^}
^{^} Shipments figures based on certification alone.

== Personnel ==
- Bass Guitar, Vocals – Todd Hunter
- Drums – Kerry Jacobson
- Keyboards, Vocals – Paul Hewson
- Guitar, Vocals – Robert Taylor
- Lead Vocals – Marc Hunter
- Violin [Vitar] – Richard Lee

Production

- Management – Sebastian Chase
- Photography By – Graeme Webber
- Producer – Peter Dawkins
- Remix – Howard Steele
- Engineer – Ric Curtin
- Engineer [2nd Engineer, Remix] –Tim Dennen
- Arranged By [Strings], Conductor [Strings] – Adrian Scott
- Cover – Ian McCausland
