= Sunshine (Dragon album) =

- Original 1977 cover

Studio album by Dragon
- Released: February 1977; 1978 International release
- Genre: Pop rock
- Length: 38:32
- Labels: CBS; Portrait
- Producer: Peter Dawkins

Dragon chronology
Scented Gardens for the Blind (1975)	Sunshine (1977)	Running Free (1977)

Singles from Sunshine
- 1. "This Time" Released: 1976; 2. "Get that Jive" Released: March 1977; 3. "Sunshine" Released: 18 July 1977

Sunshine
- 1978 International release

Sunshine is the third studio album by New Zealand rock band Dragon, it was their first album after they had relocated to Sydney, Australia in May 1975. Sunshine was released in February 1977 by CBS Records and peaked at #24 on the Australian national albums charts. The album was certified gold. The single "This Time" had been released in late June 1976, which peaked at #26 on the Australian national singles charts. The second single "Get that Jive" was the best charting peaking at #13 and the third single "Sunshine" reached #36. The album had US and International releases in 1978 on Portrait Records, with "This Time" called "In the Right Direction" and an alternative cover used (see infobox).

Dragon had released two progressive rock albums in New Zealand but in Sydney they were moving to a pop rock sound and sent for keyboardist Paul Hewson of rival kiwi group Mammal. Hewson joined Dragon with Marc Hunter on vocals and his older brother Todd Hunter on bass guitar, Neil Storey on drums and Robert M. Taylor on lead guitar. Storey died of heroin overdose in September 1976, aged 22. Their debut single "This Time" had begun charting, they considered disbanding but continued with ex-Mammal drummer Kerry Jacobson to complete the album. The album was dedicated to Neil Storey (1954–1976).

== Background ==
After Dragon relocated to Sydney in May 1975 they landed a contract with CBS Records when record producer Peter Dawkins caught one of their performances. Dragon co-founder Ray Goodwin left the group in 1975, so Dragon sent for keyboard player Paul Hewson who had a reputation, in New Zealand, as a pop songwriter. Hewson, ex-Mammal, had been scouted by Dragon when they were still in New Zealand but had declined to join. Often courting or creating controversy, the band was rocked by the heroin overdose death of drummer Neil Storey in September 1976, aged 22. By then, their debut single "This Time" had begun charting. After considering disbanding, Todd Hunter consulted with former manager Graeme Nesbitt (ex-Mammal) who advised him to continue and organised for Kerry Jacobson (ex-Mammal) to join on drums.

== Recording ==
Marc Hunter acknowledged the difference from the band's earlier prog rock records. He said, "We used to have about ten styles, but we narrowed it down to about four of the album. We thought if we went out and did everything we could do it'd be confusing for anyone who was listening. The wonderful record company thought it would be too."

== Reception ==
Rip It Up noted that the song-writing in the band had matured, saying, "A few might argue that Dragon, in adopting a more commercial format, have forsaken their Art: a few more may grumble about the weaker songs on side two, but I for one see their adoption of a tried and true style as good discipline."

RAM said, "It's a refined set covering a multiplicity of styles, a fervent statement of life from a band who've most of their time in Oz teetering on the brink of oblivion."

== Track listing ==
=== Australian/New Zealand release ===
All songwriters according to Australasian Performing Right Association (APRA).

1. "Same Old Blues" (Paul Hewson) - 4:54
2. "Blacktown Boogie" (Marc Hunter, Robert M. Taylor, Todd Hunter) - 3:15
3. "Sunshine" (Hewson) - 4:50
4. "On the Beachead" (Taylor) - 3:59
5. "This Time" (Hewson, M Hunter, Neil Storey, Taylor, T Hunter) - 3:07 ^^
6. "Get that Jive" (Hewson) - 2:44
7. "Street Between Your Feet" (M Hunter, Taylor) - 4:19
8. "New Machine" (Hewson) - 3:47
9. "MX" (M Hunter, Taylor) - 3:28
10. "The Letter" (M Hunter, Taylor) - 4:09

=== International release ===
1. "Same Old Blues" (Hewson) - 4:54
2. "Blacktown Boogie" (M Hunter, Taylor, T Hunter) - 3:15
3. "Sunshine" (Hewson) - 4:50
4. "On the Beachead" (Taylor) - 3:59
5. "In the Right Direction" (Hewson, M Hunter, Storey, Taylor, T Hunter) - 3:07 ^^
6. "Get that Jive" (Hewson) - 2:44
7. "Street Between Your Feet" (M Hunter, Taylor) - 4:19
8. "New Machine" (Hewson) - 3:47
9. "MX" (M Hunter, Taylor) - 3:28
10. "The Letter" (M Hunter, Taylor) - 4:09

(^^) "This Time" was renamed "In the Right Direction" for International release but is otherwise the same.

== Charts ==
Chart (1977)	Peak position
Australian Albums (Kent Music Report)	24

== Certifications ==
Region	Certification	Certified units/sales
Australia (ARIA)	Gold	20,000^{^}
^{^} Shipments figures based on certification alone.

== Personnel ==
Credited to:

=== Dragon ===
- Paul Hewson – keyboards
- Marc Hunter – lead vocals
- Todd Hunter – bass guitar
- Kerry Jacobson – drums (except "This Time")
- Neil Storey – drums on "This Time"
- Robert M. Taylor – guitars (electric, acoustic)

=== Additional musicians ===
- Tony Buchanan – tenor saxophone on "Sunshine"
- William Motzing – brass arranger

=== Recording ===
- Producer – Peter Dawkins
- Engineer – Bruce Brown @ Albert Studio
  - Additional engineering – Wyn Wynard
- Manager – Sebastian Chase

=== Artwork ===
- Art Direction & Design – J. Peter Thoeming
  - International release, Illustrator – Julia van Henneside
  - International release, Design – Nancy Donald, Tim Stocke
  - International release, Inner sleeve logo – Andy Capel
- Cover Photography – Carroll Holloway
