= Running Free (album) =

Studio album by Dragon
- Released: November 1977
- Genre: Pop rock
- Length: 36:39
- Labels: Portrait Records, CBS Records
- Producer: Peter Dawkins

Dragon chronology
Sunshine (1977)	Running Free (1977)	O Zambezi (1978)

Singles from Running Free
- 1. "April Sun in Cuba" Released: October 1977; 2. "Shooting Stars" Released: January 1978

Running Free is the fourth studio album by New Zealand rock band Dragon. It was produced by Peter Dawkins and was originally released in November 1977 on vinyl and re-released on CD in 1989. The album peaked at number 6 on the Australian Kent Music Report. The album was certified triple platinum in Australia.

== Reception ==
Skip Jansen from AllMusic gave the album 3 out of 5 saying commented on the change of sound from previous records from the "verbose progressive rock sound into an equally lurid pub rock sound" adding "the album remain [a] timepieces of a dark and decadent era for New Zealand rock."

== Track listing ==
1. "April Sun in Cuba (Marc Hunter, Paul Hewson) - 3:26
2. "Rose (M. Hunter, Robert Taylor, Todd Hunter) - 3:36
3. "Any Fool Can Tell You (P. Hewson) - 4:42
4. "Shooting Stars (P. Hewson) - 3:30
5. "Man Gone West (R. Taylor) - " 4:30
6. "Bob's Budgie Boogie (R. Taylor) - " 3:53
7. "Some Strange Dream" (T. Hunter) - 3:15
8. "Mr Thunder (M. Hunter) - " 3:50
9. "Since You Changed Your Mind (P. Hewson) - " 3:41
10. "Running Free" (M. Hunter, R. Taylor, T. Hunter) - 4:16

== Charts ==
Chart (1977–1978)	Peak position
Australian Albums (Kent Music Report)	6
New Zealand Albums (RMNZ)	16

== Certifications ==
Region	Certification	Certified units/sales
Australia (ARIA)	3× Platinum	150,000^{^}
^{^} Shipments figures based on certification alone.

== Personnel ==
- Bass – Todd Hunter
- Guitar – Robert Taylor
- Keyboards – Paul Hewson
- Lead Vocals – Marc Hunter
- Percussion – Kerry Jacobson
- Vocals – Paul Hewson, Robert Taylor, Todd Hunter
