= Sunshine (Dragon song) =

Single by Dragon

from the album Sunshine
- Released: 17 July 1977
- Genre: Rock
- Length: 4:26
- Label: CBS
- Songwriter(s): Paul Hewson
- Producer(s): Peter Dawkins

Dragon singles chronology
| "Get that Jive" (1977) | "Sunshine" (1977) | "April Sun in Cuba" (1977) |

"Sunshine" is a song by New Zealand–Australian rock band Dragon released on July 1977, as the third and final single to be released from the band's third studio album Sunshine (1976). It peaked at number 36 on the Kent Music Report and remained in the chart for 15 weeks.

== Track listing ==
1. Sunshine (Paul Hewson) – 4:26
2. New Machine (P. Hewson) – 3:47

== Charts ==
| Chart (1977) | Peak position |
|---|---|
| Australian Kent Music Report | 36 |

== Certifications ==
| Region | Certification | Certified units/sales |
|---|---|---|
| Australia (ARIA) | Gold | 50,000^{^} |
^{^} Shipments figures based on certification alone.

== Personnel ==
- Paul Hewson – keyboards
- Marc Hunter — lead vocals
- Todd Hunter — bass guitar
- Kerry Jacobson – drums
- Robert M. Taylor – Guitars (electric, acoustic)

Production

- Producer – Peter Dawkins
