= Konkaroo =

Single by Dragon

from the album Dragon's Greatest Hits Vol. 1
- Released: April 1978
- Genre: Rock
- Length: 3:26
- Label: Portrait Records
- Songwriter(s): Paul Hewson
- Producer(s): Peter Dawkins

Dragon singles chronology
"Shooting Stars" (1978)	"Konkaroo" (1978)	"Are You Old Enough?" (1978)

"Konkaroo" is a song by New Zealand band Dragon, released in April 1978. A non-album single, it was included on the group's first greatest hits, Dragon's Greatest Hits Vol. 1 in 1979. The B-side, "Mr. Thunder", appears on the group's fourth album Running Free.

== Track listing ==
1. Konkaroo (Paul Hewson) - 3:26
2. Mr. Thunder (Marc Hunter) - 3:45

== Charts ==
Chart (1978)	Peak position
Australian Kent Music Report	40

== Personnel ==
- Bass guitar, vocals – Todd Hunter
- Drums – Kerry Jacobson
- Guitar, vocals – Robert Taylor
- Keyboards, vocals – Paul Hewson
- Producer – Peter Dawkins
- Vocals – Marc Hunter
