= Western Girls (Dragon song) =

Single by Dragon

from the album Dreams of Ordinary Men
- B-side: "When I'm Gone"
- Released: November 1986
- Genre: Rock, pop
- Length: 4:10
- Label: Polydor Records
- Songwriter(s): Todd Rundgren, Alan Mansfield, Sharon O'Neill, Marc Hunter
- Producer(s): Todd Rundgren

Dragon singles chronology
| "Dreams of Ordinary Men" (1986) | "Western Girls" (1986) | "Nothing to Lose" (1987) |

"Western Girls" is a song by New Zealand-Australian rock band Dragon released in November 1986 as the third single from the group's eighth studio album Dreams of Ordinary Men (1986). The song peaked at number 58 on the Australian Kent Music Report and 37 in New Zealand.

== Track listing ==
1. "Western Girls" (Alan Mansfield, Doane Perry, Marc Hunter, Sharon O'Neill, Todd Rundgren) - 4:10
2. "When I'm Gone" (Marc Hunter, Martin Briley) - 3:30

== Charts ==
| Chart (1986/87) | Peak position |
|---|---|
| Australian Kent Music Report | 58 |
| New Zealand (Recorded Music NZ) | 37 |
