= Young Years =

Single by Dragon

from the album Bondi Road
- B-side: "Runaway"
- Released: 3 April 1989
- Recorded: 1988
- Studio: Axle Studios
- Genre: Rock
- Length: 3:56
- Label: RCA
- Songwriter(s): Alan Mansfield, Sharon O'Neill
- Producer(s): David Hirschfelder

Dragon singles chronology
"River" (1988)	"Young Years" (1989)	"Here Am I" (1989)

"Young Years" is a song by New Zealand group Dragon, released on 3 April 1989 as the second single to be released from the group's ninth studio album Bondi Road (1989). "Young Years" peaked at No. 18 on the ARIA charts and No. 13 on the Recorded Music NZ chart, their final top 40 hit to date.

== Overview ==
NZOn Screen said, "Marc is celebratory in one of his last videos with the band. Todd — bass against the bush background — is gleeful. Written by keyboard player Alan Mansfield and his partner, Kiwi singer Sharon O’Neill, ‘Young Years’ gained added poignancy following Marc Hunter's death in 1998.

== Track listing ==
1. Young Years (Alan Mansfield, Sharon O'Neill) – 3:56
2. Runaway (Alan Mansfield, Sharon O'Neill) – 3:49

== Charts ==
Chart (1989)	Peak position
Australia (ARIA)	18
New Zealand (Recorded Music NZ)	13

== Certifications ==
Region	Certification	Certified units/sales
New Zealand (RMNZ)	Gold	15,000^{‡}
^{‡} Sales+streaming figures based on certification alone.

== Personnel ==
- Backing vocals – Mary Azzopardi, Wendy Matthews
- Drums – Mitch Farmer
- Bass, backing vocals – Todd Hunter
- Banjo – Mark Collins
- Saxophone – Andrew Oh
- Violin – Wayne Goodwin
- Guitar – Tommy Emmanuel, Mike Caen
- Keyboards – Alan Mansfield, David Hirschfelder, Lee Borkman
- Lead and backing vocals – Marc Hunter
