= Dreams of Ordinary Men (song) =

Single by Dragon

from the album Dreams of Ordinary Men
- B-side: "Start it Up"
- Released: August 1986
- Genre: Rock, pop
- Length: 4:02
- Label: Polydor Records
- Songwriter(s): Alan Mansfield, Doane Perry, Johanna Pigott, Todd Hunter, Todd Rundgren
- Producer(s): Todd Rundgren

Dragon singles chronology
"Speak No Evil" (1985)	"Dreams of Ordinary Men" (1986)	"Western Girls" (1986)

"Dreams of Ordinary Men" is a song by New Zealand-Australian rock band Dragon released in August 1986 as the second single from the group's eighth studio album Dreams of Ordinary Men (1986). The song peaked at number 17 on the Australian Kent Music Report.

== Track listing ==
7"

1. "Dreams of Ordinary Men" (Alan Mansfield, Doane Perry, Johanna Pigott, Marc Hunter, Todd Hunter, Todd Rundgren) - 4:02
2. "Start it Up" (Mansfield, Perry, M. Hunter, T. Hunter) - 4:20

12"

1. "Dreams of Ordinary Men" (Mansfield, Perry, Pigott, T. Hunter, Rundgren) (extended) - 7:11
2. "Start it Up" (Mansfield, Perry, M. Hunter, T. Hunter) (extended) - 7:03

== Charts ==
Chart (1986)	Peak position
Australian Kent Music Report	17
New Zealand (Recorded Music NZ)	43
