= Speak No Evil (song) =

Single by Dragon

from the album Dreams of Ordinary Men
- B-side: "Witnessing"
- Released: February 1985
- Genre: Rock, pop
- Length: 4:00
- Label: Polydor Records
- Songwriter(s): Johanna Pigott, Alan Mansfield, Todd Hunter
- Producer(s): Todd Hunter, Alan Mansfield

Dragon singles chronology
"Body and the Beat" (1984)	"Speak No Evil" (1985)	"Dreams of Ordinary Men" (1985)

"Speak No Evil" is a song by New Zealand band Dragon released in February 1985 as the lead single from the group's eighth studio album Dreams of Ordinary Men. The song peaked at number 19 on the Australian Kent Music Report.

== Track listing ==
1. "Speak No Evil" (Johanna Pigott, Alan Mansfield, Todd Hunter) - 4:00
2. "Witnessing" (Marc Hunter, Todd Hunter) - 4:42

== Charts ==
Chart (1985)	Peak position
Australian Kent Music Report	19
