= This Time (Dragon song) =

Single by Dragon

from the album Sunshine
- A-side: "This Time"
- B-side: "The Dreaded Moroczy Bind"
- Released: June 1976
- Genre: Rock
- Length: 3:05
- Label: CBS Records, Portrait Records
- Songwriters: Marc Hunter; Neil Storey; Paul Hewson; Robert Taylor; Todd Hunter
- Producer: Peter Dawkins

Dragon singles chronology
"Wait Until Tomorrow" (1976)	"This Time" (1976)	"Get that Jive" (1977)

"This Time" (also titled as "In the Right Direction" in some international releases) is a song by the New Zealand band Dragon, released in 1976, and included on their album Sunshine. It was released as a single in June 1976, and peaked at No. 26 on the Australian national singles chart, remaining on the chart for twenty-three weeks.

== B-side ==
The B-side, "The Dreaded Moroczy Bind", did not appear on any of Dragon's studio albums but was included on Greatest Hits Vol. 1 and some subsequent compilations. Chess-fan Hewson named it after the Maróczy Bind, a pawn formation.

== Track listing ==
1. This Time (Marc Hunter, Neil Storey, Paul Hewson, Robert Taylor, Todd Hunter) – 3:05
2. The Dreaded Moroczy Bind (Marc Hunter, Neil Storey, Paul Hewson, Robert Taylor, Todd Hunter) – 3:24

== Charts ==
Chart (1976/77)	Peak position
Australian Kent Music Report	26

== Personnel ==
- Paul Hewson – keyboards
- Marc Hunter – vocals
- Todd Hunter – bass guitar
- Neil Storey – drums
- Robert M. Taylor – guitars (electric, acoustic)

Production

- Producer – Peter Dawkins
