= Get That Jive =

Single by Dragon

from the album Sunshine
- A-side: "Get that Jive"
- B-side: "On the Beachhead"
- Released: March 1977
- Genre: Rock
- Length: 2:44
- Label: CBS Records
- Songwriter(s): Paul Hewson
- Producer(s): Peter Dawkins

Dragon singles chronology
"This Time" (1976)	"Get That Jive" (1977)	"Sunshine" (1977)

"Get That Jive" is a song by Australian–New Zealand band Dragon released in March 1977 as the second single from the band's third studio album, Sunshine (1977). "Get That Jive" peaked at No. 13 on the Australian Kent Music Report. It was the first of the group's singles to feature drummer Kerry Jacobson.

== Track listing ==
1. Get That Jive (Paul Hewson) – 2:44
2. On the Beachhead (Robert Taylor) – 4:00

== Charts ==
=== Weekly charts ===
Chart (1977)	Peak position
Australian (Kent Music Report)	13

=== Year-end charts ===
Chart (1977)	Position
Australia (Kent Music Report)	84

== Personnel ==
- Paul Hewson – keyboards
- Marc Hunter — lead vocals
- Todd Hunter — bass guitar
- Kerry Jacobson – drums
- Robert M. Taylor – Guitars (electric, acoustic)

=== Production ===
- Producer – Peter Dawkins
