= Still in Love with You (Dragon song) =

"Still In Love With You"

Single by Dragon

from the album O Zambezi
- Released: October 1978
- Genre: Rock
- Length: 3:22
- Label: Portrait
- Songwriter(s): Paul Hewson
- Producer(s): Peter Dawkins

Dragon singles chronology
"Are You Old Enough?" (1978)	"Still In Love With You" (1978)	"Love's Not Enough" (1979)

"Still in Love with You" is a song by then Australian-based New Zealand rock band Dragon, released in October 1978 as the second and final single to be released from the band's fifth studio album O Zambezi (1978).

== Overview ==
One of a series of songs written by keyboardist Paul Hewson, "Still in Love with You" is a live staple for the band.

== Track listing ==
1. "Still in Love with You" (Paul Hewson) – 3:22
2. "Politics" (Robert Taylor, Todd Hunter, Jen Hunter-Brown) – 3:57

== Personnel ==
- Todd Hunter – bass guitar, vocals
- Kerry Jacobson – drums
- Paul Hewson – keyboards, vocals
- Robert Taylor – lead guitar, vocals
- Marc Hunter – lead vocals
- Richard Lee – Vitar violin

== Charts ==
Chart performance for "Still in Love with You"
Chart (1978–1979)	Peak position
Australia (Kent Music Report)	27
New Zealand (Recorded Music NZ)	35

== Certifications ==
Region	Certification	Certified units/sales
New Zealand (RMNZ)	Gold	15,000^{‡}
^{‡} Sales+streaming figures based on certification alone.
