= April Sun in Cuba =

Single by Dragon

from the album Running Free
- A-side: "April Sun in Cuba"
- B-side: "Telephone"
- Released: October 1977
- Genre: Rock; pub rock
- Length: 3:24
- Label: Portrait Records
- Songwriters: Marc Hunter, Paul Hewson
- Producer: Peter Dawkins

Dragon singles chronology
"Sunshine" (1977)	"April Sun in Cuba" (1977)	"Shooting Stars" (1978)

"April Sun in Cuba" is a song recorded by New Zealand group Dragon, released in October 1977. It is the first single to be released from Dragon's fourth studio album Running Free. "April Sun in Cuba" first charted on 7 November 1977, peaking at number two on the Kent Music Report Singles Chart and staying on the chart for 22 weeks. It also reached number nine on the New Zealand singles chart. The b-side of the single, a non-album track called "Telephone", was credited to "Dr. Agony".

== Track listing ==
1. April Sun in Cuba (Marc Hunter, Paul Hewson) — 3:24
2. Telephone (Paul Hewson, Marc Hunter, Todd Hunter) — 3:10

== Charts ==
=== Weekly charts ===
Chart (1977/78)	Peak position
Australian Kent Music Report	2
New Zealand (Recorded Music NZ)	9

=== Year-end charts ===
Chart (1977)	Position
Australia (Kent Music Report)	91
Chart (1978)	Position
Australian (Kent Music Report)	32

== Certifications ==
Region	Certification	Certified units/sales
Australia (ARIA)	Gold	50,000^{^}
New Zealand (RMNZ)	5× Platinum	150,000^{‡}
^{^} Shipments figures based on certification alone.^{‡} Sales+streaming figures based on certification alone.

== Personnel ==
- Bass – Todd Hunter
- Guitar – Robert Taylor
- Keyboards – Paul Hewson
- Lead Vocals – Marc Hunter
- Percussion – Kerry Jacobson
- Vocals – Paul Hewson, Robert Taylor, Todd Hunter

Production

- Producer – Peter Dawkins
- Written by - Marc Hunter, Paul Hewson
