= Are You Old Enough? =

Single by Dragon

from the album O Zambezi
- Released: August 1978
- Genre: Rock
- Length: 4:08
- Label: Portrait Records
- Songwriter: Paul Hewson
- Producer: Peter Dawkins

Dragon singles chronology
"Konkaroo" (1977)	"Are You Old Enough?" (1978)	"Still in Love with You" (1978)

"Are You Old Enough?" is a song by New Zealand rock band Dragon, released in August 1978 while the band was still based in Australia. It was released as the first single from the group's fifth studio album O Zambezi (1978). The song peaked at number one on the Australian Kent Music Report, becoming the group's first number-one single.

== Reception ==
Reviewed at the time of release, South Australian music magazine Roadrunner said the song was, "Their best yet. This band continues to make superb sounding singles (this will be No 1 for sure) and continue to be the most sexist band in the country. This one, about fucking young women and going to gaol for it is their most offensive yet."

David Nichols described the song as, "essentially a paean to underage sex, perhaps even pedophilia. A glowing, irresistible pop tune, sung delectably by Marc Hunter with uncredited backing vocal from Renée Geyer, it is a virtually flawless pop record, its subversive nature being an essential element of this status."

"When we'd go on the road Paul Hewson would bring a small bag with a few clothes and a chess set. He wrote most of "Are you old enough" on a nylon string guitar out on the water in a dinghy off Magnetic Island with a couple of girls who he wasn't too sure about". (As told to Paul Schluter by Todd Hunter, 2005, Cranbrook)

== Track listing ==
1. Are You Old Enough? (Paul Hewson) - 4:08
2. Company (Jenny Brown, Todd Hunter) - 3:54

== Charts ==
=== Weekly charts ===
Chart (1978/79)	Peak position
Australian Kent Music Report	1
New Zealand (Recorded Music NZ)	6

=== Year-end charts ===
Chart (1978)	Position
Australian Kent Music Report	14

== Certifications ==
Region	Certification	Certified units/sales
New Zealand (RMNZ)	2× Platinum	60,000^{‡}
^{‡} Sales+streaming figures based on certification alone.

== Personnel ==
- Bass guitar, vocals – Todd Hunter
- Drums – Kerry Jacobson
- Keyboards, vocals – Paul Hewson
- Lead guitar, vocals – Robert Taylor
- Lead vocals – Marc Hunter
- Violin [Vitar] – Richard Lee
