= Peter Dawkins (musician) =

New Zealand musician and record producer

Peter William Dawkins (27 November 1946 – 3 July 2014) was a New Zealand record producer and musician, best known for his late-1960s to mid-1970s New Zealand hits and his 1970s productions for Australian-based pop artists, including Dragon, Australian Crawl and Air Supply. He won multiple production awards, including the Countdown Producer of the Year. In the late 1980s, he developed Parkinson's disease.

== Early days ==
Born in Timaru, New Zealand, Dawkins started in the music business as a drummer in his teens; he toured Europe in the mid-1960s with his freakbeat bands Me and the Others, and The New Nadir. In London they jammed at The Speakeasy with Jimi Hendrix, which eventually led to the recording of a lost 7" acetate for the UK Polydor Records label. Over 40 years later, in 2009 a whole album of 1966 – 1967 recordings by Me and the Others and The New Nadir was finally released by Feathered Apple Records. After the breakup of The New Nadir, guitarist and lead vocalist Ed Carter moved to California to play for the Beach Boys, bassist Gary Thain joined the Keef Hartley Band, and then Uriah Heep before dying of an overdose in 1975. Dawkins returned home in late 1968 and started his production career with His Master's Voice Records, the NZ branch of EMI, where he produced a large number of recordings, scoring seven No.1 pop hits including "Nature" by The Fourmyula.

== Australia and the 1970s ==
Dawkins moved to Australia in c.1972 and became a house producer for EMI Australia, where he succeeded fellow New Zealand expatriate Howard Gable as the producer of leading Australian progressive rock band Spectrum, for whom he produced the albums Warts Up Your Nose (1972, released under the pseudonym 'Indelible Murtceps'), Testimonial (1973), and the valedictory live album Terminal Buzz. Around 1972/1973 he also produced early singles for John Farnham (then known as Johnny Farnham), including "Don't You Know It's Magic" and "Rock Me Baby".

In the mid-seventies Dawkins produced Spectrum's successor Ariel, including their acclaimed albums A Strange Fantastic Dream (1973) and Rock 'n' Roll Scars (1974), which was recorded at Abbey Road Studios in London, and engineered by the legendary Geoff Emerick. During 1973 Dawkins also created, co-wrote, and produced The Star Suite (EMI Records), a concept album based on astrological themes, released under the name 'Patch', and featuring an all-star lineup of players that included members of Ariel and Tamam Shud, as well as leading Australian session musicians.

In 1975, he moved briefly to Festival Records, where he worked with Billy Thorpe (including Thorpe's 1975 solo hit "It's Almost Summer"), before moving to CBS Records. He then produced a string of successful recordings, including hits for the expatriate New Zealand rock group Dragon and Melbourne band Australian Crawl, as well as reggae-rock group Billy T (which included former Daddy Cool guitarist Ross Hannaford), and hard rock group Rabbit, which was fronted by original AC/DC vocalist Dave Evans.

During this period, Dawkins also produced several albums and hit singles by singer-songwriter Ross Ryan, including Ryan's signature hit "I Am Pegasus". Remarkably, Dawkins had to fight to get the song released as a single, over the vocal objections of Ryan's then manager, who loudly declared, "There is no way in the world that is going to be a hit!" In fact, the song reached No. 3 on the national chart. Dawkins also produced hit albums and singles for expatriate NZ band Mi-Sex, the Australian group Pseudo Echo, the hugely successful album-oriented rock group Air Supply, country music star Slim Dusty, singer-songwriter Russell Morris and rocker Billy Thorpe, amongst many others. (See discography below).

In early 1976, at the urging of Ariel's Mike Rudd, Dawkins went to see the recently arrived NZ band Dragon at the Recovery Wine Bar in Camperdown, Sydney, and he was so impressed by their material (mostly written by keyboard player Paul Hewson) that he immediately signed them to a recording contract with CBS' subsidiary label, Portrait. Dawkins' productions for Dragon included the hit singles "This Time", "Are You Old Enough?" and "April Sun in Cuba", and the LPs Sunshine, Running Free and O Zambezi. His success led to a move to Los Angeles for a year in 1976. In 1978 he flew to a Holiday Inn club in Baltimore, Maryland, to see singer songwriter Tony Sciuto, and signed him on the spot to a CBS Record contract. (Island Nights EPIC 1980)

== 1980s, illness and onwards ==
While working as A&R Manager at CBS Australia in 1980, Dawkins discovered the band Matt Finish and left CBS to start his first label, The Giant Recording Label. Subsequently, Giant released Matt Finish's enduring cult classics Short Note and Fade Away. Giant later signed Melbourne band Little Heroes.

Dawkins produced Australian Crawl's album Sirocco, which went to No. 1 in Australia and earned four platinum records. He went on to be general manager of EMI Australia in the mid-1980s.

In 1986, he was appointed general manager of music publisher J. Albert & Son, running its London office. The death of CEO Ted Albert precipitated Dawkins' return to Australia and another change of employment.

In 1990, Dawkins opened Giant Studios Balmain, Sydney, and started his second label (through BMG) called Nova. The earlier Giant name was bought by Irving Azoff, who was starting a label in the United States with the same name.

Dawkins' development of Parkinson's disease meant that he had to gradually cease work over the next few years, with the shut-down of the studio in the mid-1990s. In 2005, he was able to afford further medical treatment, deep brain stimulation, after extensive fund-raising by his friends in the music industry.

As part of that effort, in 2006, Sony/BMG issued a compilation album of Dawkins' productions, For Pete's Sake, which included the Matt Finish hit Short Note, and a new song, "Understand", written by Dawkins' son Paul and the late Matt Moffitt, and sung by the Little River Band's Glenn Shorrock. It was produced at Sony Studios in Sydney and mixed by noted engineer Richard Lush. The CD included liner notes by rock music historian Glenn A. Baker.

Dawkins died on 3 July 2014, from injuries sustained in a fall.

== Selective list of Peter Dawkins' productions ==
- Shane: "St. Paul" – Dawkins' first New Zealand #1 hit (1969)
- The Fourmyula: "Nature" (1969)
- Russell Morris: "Wings of an Eagle" (1972)
- Spectrum: Testimonial (1973); Terminal Buzz (1973)
- John Farnham: "Rock Me Baby" (1972); "Don't You Know It's Magic" (1973)
- Ariel: A Strange Fantastic Dream (1973); Rock 'n' Roll Scars (1974)
- Patch: The Star Suite (1973)
- Ross Ryan: "I Am Pegasus" – AUS: No. 9 (1973)
- Slim Dusty: Australiana (1973), Lights on the Hill (1974)
- Billy Thorpe: "It's Almost Summer" (1975)
- Air Supply: "Love and Other Bruises" (1976)
- Dragon: "This Time" (1976); "April Sun in Cuba" (1977); "Are You Old Enough?" (1978); and album O Zambezi (1978)
- Mi-Sex: "Computer Games" (1979)
- MEO 245: Screen Memory
- Sharon O’Neill: "How Do You Talk to Boys?" (1980)
- Matt Finish: Short Note (1981)
- Little Heroes "The Little Heroes" (1981)
- Australian Crawl: Sirocco (1981) – Australian No. 1
- Outline: Maybe It's a Game (1982)
- Pseudo Echo: "Listening" (1983)
- Az One: "New Love" (1991)

== Awards and nominations ==
=== King of Pop Awards ===
The King of Pop Awards were voted by the readers of TV Week. The King of Pop award started in 1967 and ran through to 1978.

Year	Nominee / work	Award	Result
1977	himself	Best Australian Record Producer	Won

=== TV Week / Countdown Awards ===
Countdown was an Australian pop music TV series on national broadcaster ABC-TV from 1974–1987, it presented music awards from 1979–1987, initially in conjunction with magazine TV Week. The TV Week / Countdown Awards were a combination of popular-voted and peer-voted awards.

Year	Nominee / work	Award	Result
1979	himself for Graffiti Crimes for Mi-Sex	Best Australian Producer	Won
1980	himself	Best Australian Producer	Nominated
1981	himself	Best Australian Producer	Won
