= Rain (Dragon song) =

- International version: new drummer, Terry Chambers (second from left), was not used for original recording

Single by Dragon

from the album Body and the Beat
- B-side: "It's Too Late"
- Released: July 1983
- Recorded: 1983
- Studio: Rhinoceros Studios, Sydney
- Genre: Rock
- Length: 3:33
- Label: Mercury
- Songwriters: Johanna Pigott, Todd Hunter, Marc Hunter
- Producer: Alan Mansfield

Dragon singles chronology
"Ramona" (1982)	"Rain" (1983)	"Magic" (1983)

"Rain" is a song by New Zealand rock group Dragon released in July 1983 as the first single ahead of their seventh studio album, Body and the Beat (June 1984). It is co-written by the group's brothers, Marc and Todd Hunter, with Johanna Pigott, Todd's then-domestic partner. "Rain" peaked at number 2 and stayed in the Kent Music Report singles chart for 26 weeks. The song reached number 88 on the United States Billboard Hot 100 charts in mid-1984. For the original single version the group's Kerry Jacobson had provided drums and percussion; he left the group in September 1983 and was replaced by Terry Chambers, who is shown in promotional material including cover art and music videos.

At the 1983 Countdown Music Awards, the song was nominated for Best Australian Single.

== Background ==
Dragon issued "Rain" in July 1983 almost a year after the group had reconvened in the previous August with the line-up of Marc and Todd Hunter, Robert Taylor, Paul Hewson and Kerry Jacobson.

They undertook the Class Reunion tour in late 1982, which was "ostensibly run to pay off outstanding debts, the tour proved so successful that the band re-formed on a permanent basis", according to Australian musicologist Ian McFarlane. In October of that year they issued a single, "Ramona", which did not reach the top 50 on the Kent Music Report Singles Chart.

The group's bass guitarist, Todd, had started writing the instrumental portion of "Rain" at his home in Bondi when his domestic partner, Johanna Pigott, jokingly sang, "It's raining, it's pouring" from the children's nursery rhyme over the top of it. This provided the lyrical focus for the work. Pigott recalled, "[it] was written before Dragon even reformed. I didn't think it'd be a hit but Todd always thinks all his songs are hits."

American producer Alan Mansfield, who had worked with the group's lead singer, Marc, on his solo material, was invited to work with Dragon. At the first recording session, Jacobson, their drummer had a headache and took some over-the-counter medication. Together with Todd and Taylor, Jacobson, "laid down an aggressive bed to which overdubs could be added" on their third take.

Mansfield told Jacobson to go home to recover while Todd, Marc and Pigott were asked to finish off the lyrics. Meanwhile, Mansfield recorded Hewson's "low, menacing synthesiser parts." The producer also provided his own keyboards, guitar and backing vocals. Upon hearing their work, after the first day's sessions, the Hunter brothers told Mansfield, "If this song doesn't make it to number one you'll have to join the band."

"Rain" first charted in Australia on 15 August 1983, peaked at number 2 and stayed in the Kent Music Report singles chart for 26 weeks. In September Jacobson injured his right index finger, he was temporarily replaced by Brent Eccles (on loan from The Angels) for two weeks of gigs in Sydney and Melbourne. Jacobson left the group and was replaced by Terry Chambers (ex-XTC) on drums, soon after Mansfield joined the band on keyboards, guitar and vocals.

Three music videos were filmed for the track – in the first, Marc's infant son appears below Hewson's keyboards. For its United States release their label, PolyGram International, made a second version with the new band members, Chambers and Mansfield, appearing – the group disapproved of its "post-apocalyptic scenario" and a third one was commissioned. This version also has Chambers and Mansfield as band members. The song peaked at number 88 on the US Billboard Hot 100 charts in mid-1984.

The new line-up recorded a single, "Magic" (December 1983), which was also produced by Mansfield – it reached the top 40 in Australia. Both singles were included on Dragon's seventh studio album, Body and the Beat (June 1984), with Carey Taylor as producer for the new tracks.

== Track listings ==
7" Australian version on Mercury Records (812 763-7)
No.	Title	Writer(s)	Length
1.	"Rain"	Johanna Pigott, Marc Hunter, Todd Hunter	3:33
2.	"It's Too Late"	B. Hamilton, M. Hunter, P. Grinwood	3:03

7" International version on Polydor Records (817 292-7)
No.	Title	Writer(s)	Length
1.	"Rain"	Pigott, M. Hunter, T. Hunter	3:33
2.	"Moroxy Bind" (a.k.a. "Dreaded Moroczy Bird")	Paul Hewson, M. Hunter, Robert Taylor, Neil Storey, T. Hunter	3:19

12" Maxi version on Polydor Records (881 328-1)
No.	Title	Writer(s)	Length
1.	"Rain" (dance mix)	Pigott, M. Hunter, T. Hunter	6:45
2.	"Rain" (dub mix)	Pigott, M. Hunter, T. Hunter	6:52

== Personnel ==
Dragon

- Paul Hewson – keyboards, vocals
- Marc Hunter – lead vocals
- Todd Hunter – vocals, bass guitar
- Kerry Jacobson – percussion, drums
- Robert Taylor – guitar, vocals

Additional musicians

- Alan Mansfield – keyboards, guitar, vocals

Recording details

- Steve Bywaters – audio engineer
- Alan Mansfield – producer at Rhinoceros Studios, Sydney
- Otto Ruiter – mastering engineer at EMI Studios 301, Sydney for "It's Too Late"
- Carey Taylor – mixing engineer at Fast Forward Recorders, Melbourne for "Rain"

== Charts ==
=== Weekly charts ===
Weekly chart performance for "Rain"
Chart (1983–1984)	Peak position
Australia (Kent Music Report)	2
US Billboard Hot 100	88

=== Year-end charts ===
Year-end chart performance for "Rain"
Chart (1983)	Position
Australia (Kent Music Report)	15

== Certifications ==
Region	Certification	Certified units/sales
New Zealand (RMNZ)	4× Platinum	120,000^{‡}
^{‡} Sales+streaming figures based on certification alone.

== The Drought Breakers version ==
In 2018, Australian musician Scott Darlow enlisted the help of Australian musicians to re-record the track with all net proceeds from the sale to go towards to the Buy-a-bale program in support of Australian farmers suffering from the Australian drought. The musicians include Darlow, Sarah McLeod, Adam Brand, Jack Jones and Todd Hunter. The track was released on 14 September 2018.
