= Dragon (band) =

New Zealand rock band

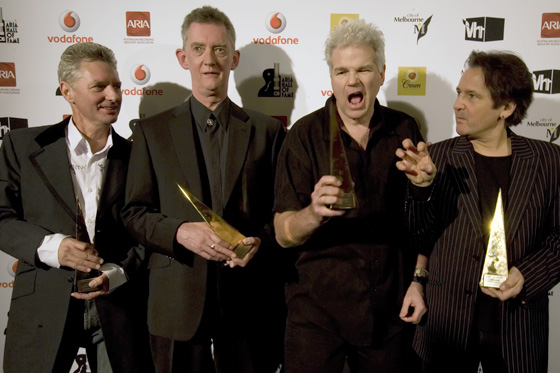
- Dragon at the ARIA Hall of Fame; Melbourne Town Hall on 1 July 2008; Left to right: Kerry Jacobson, Rob Taylor, Todd Hunter and Alan Mansfield

Background information
- Also known as: Hunter
- Origin: Auckland, New Zealand
- Genres: Pop rock; new wave; progressive rock
- Years active: 1972–1979, 1982–1997, 2006–present
- Labels: Vertigo, CBS, Portrait, Polydor, RCA, J &B, K-tel Liberation Music
- Members: Todd Hunter; Mark Williams; Bruce Reid
- Past members: Marc Hunter; Former members
- Website: dragononline.com.au

Dragon are a New Zealand rock band which was formed in Auckland in January 1972, and, from 1975, based in Sydney, New South Wales, Australia. The band was originally fronted by singer Graeme Collins, but rose to fame with singer Marc Hunter and is currently led by his brother, bass player and co-founder Todd Hunter. Their name "Dragon" came from a consultation of I Ching cards by Collins. The group performed, and released material, under the name Hunter in Europe and the United States during 1987.

Keyboard player Paul Hewson wrote or co-wrote most of the group's 1970s hits: "April Sun in Cuba" peaked at No. 9 in New Zealand and No. 2 in Australia; "Are You Old Enough?" reached No. 6 in New Zealand and No. 1 in Australia in 1978; and "Still in Love with You" reached No. 35 and No. 27 in each country respectively that same year. Later hits, from when the band re-grouped in the 1980s, were written by other band members, often working with outside associates: The Hunter brothers, with Todd's partner, Johanna Pigott, wrote "Rain", a No. 2 hit in 1983, while other, more minor hits were written by the Hunters and/or Alan Mansfield, frequently in collaboration with any combination of Pigott, Mansfield's partner Sharon O'Neill, Marc Hunter's partner Wendy Hunter, or producers Todd Rundgren and David Hirschfelder.

Dragon has endured tragedy, adversity and notoriety, and three band members have died from drug-related causes. Problems began soon after the band's arrival in Sydney in late 1975, when all of their equipment was stolen. Several months later, in 1976, drummer Neil Storey died of a heroin overdose. The following decade, in 1985, Paul Hewson died from a drug overdose. Marc Hunter died from smoking-related throat cancer in 1998. Several members of the group including Hewson and Marc Hunter were heavy heroin users during the band's heyday and the Stewart Royal Commission (1980–1983) which investigated the Mr. Asia drug syndicate obtained evidence that Dragon members were clients. Two members were involved in a serious car crash in 1977, when Paul Hewson's neck was in a brace as well as having a broken arm and Robert Taylor needed plastic surgery, and Hewson also suffered from debilitating scoliosis and arthritis, the pain of which reportedly contributed to his heroin use. The band also undertook a famously disastrous 1978 tour of the US, supporting Johnny Winter, which ended when Marc Hunter abused a Texan audience as "faggots" and the band were pelted off stage, while Winter's band were said to have taken bets about how long it would be before Hunter was shot. On 1 July 2008, the Australian Recording Industry Association (ARIA) recognised the Auckland-formed band's iconic status in its country by inducting Dragon into the ARIA Hall of Fame.

== History ==
=== 1972–1975: Early years ===
Dragon formed in Auckland in January 1972 with a line-up that featured Todd Hunter on bass guitar, guitarist Ray Goodwin, drummer Neil Reynolds and IvanThompson on keys. All had been in various short-lived bands in Auckland, and Collins is credited with using I Ching to provide the name Dragon. Their first major gig was an appearance at the Great Ngaruawahia Music Festival in early January 1973. By 1974 several personnel changes had occurred, with Todd Hunter's younger brother, Marc Hunter, joining on vocals and Neil Storey on drums. The band recorded two progressive rock albums in Auckland, Universal Radio in June 1974 and Scented Gardens for the Blind in February 1975 both on Vertigo Records. Despite being one of Auckland's top live attractions by late 1974, neither albums nor related singles had any local chart success, and they recruited Robert Taylor (ex-Mammal) on guitar as they searched for a raunchier pop sound. By early 1975, manager Graeme Nesbitt (ex-Mammal), who had obtained regular gigs and organised their first New Zealand tours, felt they should tackle the larger Australian market. Nesbitt was unable to travel with them to Australia as he had been arrested for selling drugs.

=== 1975–1979: Australasian stardom ===
Dragon relocated to Sydney, Australia, in May 1975 and toured the country as support act to Status Quo in October. They recorded the single "Starkissed" for PolyGram, but it was not commercially successful. The band then sent for keyboard player Paul Hewson (not to be confused with Bono, frontman of Irish rock band U2) who had a reputation in New Zealand as a pop songwriter. Hewson had been scouted by Nesbitt when Dragon were still in New Zealand but had declined to join at that time. The group had originally intended to go to Canada, but opted to stay in Australia, settling in Bondi in late 1975, where they secured a residency at the Bondi Lifesaver club. They convinced Sebastian Chase to become their talent manager. On the recommendation of fellow New Zealand expatriate Mike Rudd, CBS house producer Peter Dawkins went to see the group at the Recovery Wine Bar in Camperdown, Sydney, in early 1976 and he was so impressed by their performance and Hewson's material that he immediately signed them to a contract with CBS Records. Often courting or creating controversy, the band was rocked by the heroin overdose death of 22-year-old drummer Neil Storey in September 1976. By then, founding member Ray Goodwin had left the group and their single "This Time" had begun charting.

Dragon considered disbanding after Storey's death, but Todd Hunter consulted with Nesbitt who advised him to continue and organised for Kerry Jacobson (ex-Mammal) to join on drums. Between 1977 and 1979 the Hunter brothers, Taylor, Hewson and Jacobson had a string of major hits on the Australian charts with singles "April Sun in Cuba", "Are You Old Enough?" and "Still in Love with You" and albums Sunshine (February 1977), Running Free (November 1977) and O Zambezi (September 1978). These releases, and their dynamic concert performances, made them one of Australia's most popular rock acts. They attempted a breakthrough into the American market with a tour supporting Johnny Winter, starting in November 1978, but this was foiled after a disastrous show in Dallas, Texas, at which Marc Hunter incited a crowd by suggesting all Texans were "faggots": band members had to dodge flying beer bottles.

In 1994, Marc Hunter related his version of the Texas show to rock journalist Glenn A. Baker:

"I remember seeing someone standing holding a pistol and shouting 'I'm gonna kill you, you son of a bitch' ... I didn't know it but by this point the rest of the band had left the stage. I was still singing because I could still hear the music in my head. It took ages to clear the pile of debris on the stage – broken glass, bottles, chairs, half a table – but I was totally unaware of this, I thought I was going over really well and I'm standing there in a crucifixion pose with my arms out, really gone, with heaps of eye make-up on, looking like some sort of twisted priest. And apparently Johnny Winter was taking bets on the side of the stage as to how long it would take before somebody shot me. Then I turned around and saw no one was on stage so I realised I wasn't going over too well after all and I went back to the dressing room and everyone was just standing there ... I said 'We went great, weren't we terrific?' At that stage of the band I was really a shocking sod. And all the record company people were just staring at me like I was an insectoid from Mars. And so that was it for us for that trip to America."

— Marc Hunter, 1994

In their 1970s heyday Dragon were regulars on the teen-oriented national TV pop show Countdown, which greatly enhanced their sales and popularity, with Marc Hunter hosting the show on several occasions, but the band's darker side, especially Marc's unpredictable stage behaviour, were often in evidence at their live performances. Singer and actress Jane Clifton (who played Margo Gaffney in Prisoner) relates a time when she saw them live:

"I would see him do the most unspeakable things on stage. One night at Dallas Brooks Hall they had some long song about someone going down by the riverside and getting raped or something. He got some girl out of the audience, had her on her back and he was doing this whole rave to her. He had a bottle of champagne which he proceeded to spew from his mouth all over her. I thought: I don't believe this person is letting this happen to her."

— Jane Clifton, 1993

Soon after returning to Sydney from the US, Marc Hunter was sacked from Dragon in February 1979 due to his drug and alcohol use, which was seriously affecting both his vocal performances and his general health. According to Todd Hunter:

"Things like Dallas happened all the time ... Most of the time I wasn't drinking or anything and, from my perspective, this Fall of the Roman Empire thing was pretty wild. I hated a lot of it. People came along because they wanted to see Dragon decombust. They were enjoying it but Marc was just killing himself. We had to fire him or he'd have destroyed himself."

— Todd Hunter, 1994

To replace Marc, the band recruited singer Billy Rogers, formerly of Perth group Last Chance Cafe, and violinist Richard Lee from Melbourne band Sidewinder. Dragon recorded the commercially unsuccessful Power Play (September 1979) album before breaking up in December 1979.

=== 1979–1982: First split ===
Marc Hunter cleaned up in the post-Dragon years and released two successful solo singles, "Island Nights" (1979) from Fiji Bitter and "Big City Talk" (1981) from Big City Talk. The Big City Talk video clip was filmed in the Broadway Tunnel, a long and dreary pedestrian walkway linking Sydney's Central Station with Broadway. It captured the seedy and unsettling atmosphere of the tunnel, adding extra mood to the song's words.

Todd Hunter had meanwhile teamed up with his domestic partner (and later second wife) Johanna Pigott, formerly of indie punk group XL Capris, who later fronted the alternative rock band, Scribble. Together they became a successful songwriting team, with credits including the John Farnham hit "Age of Reason". XL Capris were not commercially successful, although their memorable re-working of crooner Tommy Leonetti's "My City Of Sydney" became a minor cult classic. Todd Hunter produced both their albums Where's Hank? (March 1981) and Weeds (October 1981), and was a member of the band for the second.

Paul Hewson moved back to Auckland and joined the Pink Flamingos, who became one of New Zealand's top musical acts in the early 1980s. They were led by Dave McArtney formerly of Hello Sailor which had toured with Dragon but had also split.

=== 1982–1997: Reformation ===
Dragon reformed in August 1982 to pay off outstanding debts, but Kerry Jacobson left the band soon after the reformation, for health reasons. He was replaced by noted British drummer Terry Chambers, formerly of XTC,. Chambers, who quit XTC in 1983 after they were forced to stop touring (due to leader Andy Partridge's debilitating stage fright), had married his Australian girlfriend and settled in Newcastle, New South Wales. Dragon decided to stay together when their second comeback single, "Rain", proved to be a No. 2 hit in 1983, American keyboard player and Dragon's producer Alan Mansfield also joined. Mansfield had worked for Robert Palmer (including guitar for the "Johnny and Mary" single from Palmer's album Clues) and Bette Midler in the late 1970s, by 1982 Alan Mansfield was living in Sydney and produced tracks for Marc Hunter. Marc Hunter convinced Mansfield to also produce Dragon's single "Rain".

Dragon's June 1984 album Body and the Beat became a top five album in Australia and was certified gold in the week of release. Their public profile was further raised by Marc Hunter's solo album, Communication. Its title track became a moderate hit in Australia and featured a loosely cabaret-oriented video-clip filmed in Amsterdam in which Marc – resplendent in a bright red cowboy hat – was flanked by two women who also danced away under red Stetsons. Body and the Beat yielded further successful Australasian singles, notably "Magic" and "Cry", but the 'new' Dragon and the ascendancy of the Hunter-Piggot team also marked the rapidly declining influence of the band's former songwriting powerhouse, Paul Hewson, who only managed one co-writing credit on the album. Alan Mansfield and New Zealand-born singer-songwriter Sharon O'Neill met on Dragon's Body and the Beat tour: they later became domestic and professional partners.

Paul Hewson left Dragon in late 1984 and returned to New Zealand where he died of an accidental drug overdose on 9 January 1985. During 1984 Hewson had shared an apartment in Elizabeth Bay, Sydney, with singer-songwriter Paul Kelly, who had recently arrived from Melbourne, and was trying to relaunch his career. He and Hewson became close friends. In May 1985, four months after Hewson's death, Kelly released his breakthrough solo album Post, which dealt extensively with themes of addiction and was dedicated to Hewson's memory. Terry Chambers and Robert Taylor left some time after. Dragon performed three songs for 13 July 1985 Oz for Africa concert (part of the global Live Aid program) – "Speak No Evil", "Rain" and "Are You Old Enough?"; which was broadcast in Australia (on both Seven Network and Nine Network) and on MTV in the US. American drummer Doane Perry replaced Chambers, and Taylor was eventually succeeded by local Sydney guitar ace Tommy Emmanuel. This line-up went to America to record the Todd Rundgren-produced Dreams of Ordinary Men album in August 1986 and toured Europe with Tina Turner under the name Hunter in 1987. By this time Alan Mansfield was writing with Sharon O'Neill; they wrote "Western Girls" for Dreams of Ordinary Men and then three tracks for Sharon's 1987 fifth solo album Danced in the Fire.

Dragon briefly split up in 1988 but the Hunter brothers and Alan Mansfield then regrouped with guitarist Randall Waller and drummer Barton Price (ex-Models) for the Bondi Road album released in April 1989 on RCA, it also featured Emmanuel's guitar work. Bondi Road reached No. 18 on the Australian albums charts and the single "Young Years" written by Alan Mansfield and Sharon O'Neill also reached No. 18. The pair had written two other tracks: "Ice in this Town" and "Good Time Girl". Dragon continued to record and tour with varying line-ups centred around the Hunter brothers and Mansfield. They also supported Elton John for his 1990 Australian tour. Todd Hunter worked on Heartbreak High (TV series) from 1994 for six years as Music Composer, he retired from Dragon in 1995 after the release of Incarnations.

Dragon continued on without Todd Hunter. Then, in November 1997, Marc Hunter was diagnosed with severe throat cancer and died on 17 July 1998. A memorial service for him was held at St Andrew's Cathedral in Sydney, followed by an all-star benefit concert to raise money to support Marc's widow and child. A compilation CD, Forever Young, was released on Raven Records, highlighting his solo career.

=== 1997–2006: Second split ===
Dragon broke up a second time after Marc Hunter's illness had been diagnosed. Todd Hunter continued composing music for TV and film with Heartbreak High to 1999, Walk the Talk (2000 film), Out There (2003 TV series) and Out of the Blue (2008 BBC-TV series). Alan Mansfield and Sharon O'Neill continued songwriting including "True Love" co-written with Robert Palmer for his 1999 album Rhythm and Blues. They both performed with Leo Sayer during his tours in 2006 and 2007, Sharon O'Neill would sing "Young Years" in honour of Marc Hunter.

=== 2006–present: ARIA Hall of Fame and Mark Williams years ===
Todd Hunter (bass) reformed Dragon in 2006 with a line-up of Mark Williams (vocals, guitar), Bruce Reid (guitar) and Pete Drummond (drums). The new line-up released Sunshine to Rain on the Liberation Blue label.

Dragon were inducted into the ARIA Hall of Fame by Richard Wilkins on 1 July 2008. The band was joined on-stage by James Reyne and Ian Moss to perform "April Sun in Cuba" and "Rain":

Dragon's performance featured Ian Moss and James Reyne on vocals, alongside founding member Todd Hunter. During a fiery version of "April Sun in Cuba", the late Dragon singer Marc Hunter was incorporated into the chorus via a stirring performance video shown on a huge screen behind the band. Reyne said: "I used to go and see Dragon play in the mid to late 1970s before I even had a proper band, so it's great to be able to do this. I'm a big Dragon fan, and did tours with them when Marc was alive, and I knew him quite well. He'd think this is a blast." According to Todd Hunter, Dragon has had, at last count, 35 members and umpteen reincarnations. "Well, Wikipedia says 35 members so far", he said. "We had a long break as a band, but we started doing acoustic shows a couple of years ago. But we couldn't be heard above the crowd because they were singing so loud, so now we're back doing electric shows."

— Andrew Murfett, James Reyne, Todd Hunter

In March 2009, Dragon released online albums of previously unreleased material, including live albums. In October 2009, they released Happy I Am on Ozmo Records, distributed internationally by MGM Records.

In September 2011, Dragon released an EP titled Chase The Sun and in November, The Great Divide. The band continues to tour, including the Rhythm and Vines Festival in New Zealand in 2011, The 40th anniversary Tour, The Long Way to the Top, The Red Hot Summer Tour with Jimmy Barnes across 2012/13. A 2-CD set compilation was released in 2012 titled The Dragon Years – 40th Anniversary Collection which peaked at number 21 in New Zealand.

In 2012, their single "Are You Old Enough?" was used in the opening credits of Australian television drama series Puberty Blues.

Alan Mansfield, the group's keyboardist from 1983 to 1997, died on 16 October 2024 at the age of 72.

Robert Taylor, the group's guitarist from 1974 to their first split in 1979, then again from 1982 to his final departure in 1985, died on 4 November 2025, at the age of 74.

== Personnel ==
Below are current and former members of Dragon listed in chronological order.

=== Current members ===
- Todd Hunter – bass, backing vocals (1972–1979, 1982–1995, 2006–present)
- Mark Williams – lead vocals, guitars, keyboards (2006–present)
- Bruce Reid – guitars, backing vocals (2006–present)
- Syd Green – drums (2024–present)

=== Former members ===
- Ray Goodwin – guitar, keyboards, backing and lead vocals (1972–1975; died 2022)
- Graeme Collins – lead vocals, piano (1972–1973; died 2001)
- Neil Reynolds – drums (1972–1973)
- Neil Storey – drums (1973–1974, 1975–1976; died 1976)
- Ivan Thompson – keyboards, vocals (1973–1974)
- Marc Hunter – lead vocals, percussion, saxophone (1973–1979, 1982–1989, 1995–1997; died 1998)
- Geoff Chunn – drums (1974–1975)
- Robert Taylor – guitar, backing vocals (1974–1979, 1982–1985; died 2025)
- Paul Hewson – keyboards, backing vocals (1975–1979, 1982–1984; died 1985)
- Terry Tolhurst – drums (1976; died 1981)
- Kerry Jacobson – drums (1976–1979, 1982–1983)
- Richard Lee – violin, guitar, vocals (1979)
- Billy Rogers – lead vocals, saxophone (1979)
- Terry Chambers – drums (1983–1985)
- Alan Mansfield – keyboards, backing vocals, guitar (1983–1997; died 2024)
- Don Miller-Robinson – guitar (1985–1986)
- Doane Perry – drums (1985–1988)
- Tommy Emmanuel – guitar (1986–1988, 1995)
- David Hirschfelder – keyboards (1987, 1989)
- Peter Grimwood – guitar (1988)
- Randall Waller – guitar (1988)
- Barton Price – drums (1988)
- Sticks Mareebo – drums (1989)
- Mitch Farmer – drums (1989)
- John Watson – drums (1989)
- Andy Sidari – Bass (1989)
- Mike Caen – guitar (1989–1995, 1996–1997)
- Jeffrey Bartolomei – keyboards (1989–1996)
- Lee Borkman – keyboards (1989)
- Peter Northcote – guitar (1989–1995)
- Ange Tsoitoudis – guitar (1996–1997)
- Dario Bortolin – bass (1995-1997)
- Brad Ford – drums (1996)
- Mick O'Shea – drums (1996–1997)
- Billy Kervin – bass (1996–1997)
- Bernie Segedin – guest vocals (2007)
- Pete Drummond – drums, keyboards, backing vocals (2006–2024)

== Discography ==
- Universal Radio (1974)
- Scented Gardens for the Blind (1975)
- Sunshine (1977)
- Running Free (1977)
- O Zambezi (1978)
- Power Play (1979)
- Body and the Beat (1984)
- Dreams of Ordinary Men (1986)
- Bondi Road (1989)
- Incarnations (1995)
- Sunshine to Rain (2006)
- Happy I Am (2009)
- It's All Too Beautiful (2011)
- Roses (2014)
- Life Is a Beautiful Mess (2018)
- Dragon Celebrates Countdown 80's UK Chartbusters (2018)

== Awards and nominations ==
=== Aotearoa Music Awards ===
The Aotearoa Music Awards (previously known as New Zealand Music Awards (NZMA)) are an annual awards night celebrating excellence in New Zealand music and have been presented annually since 1965.

Year	Nominee / work	Award	Result	Ref.
1984	Dragon	International Achievement	Nominated	
2011	Dragon	New Zealand Music Hall of Fame	inductee	

=== ARIA Music Awards ===
The ARIA Music Awards is an annual awards ceremony that recognises excellence, innovation, and achievement across all genres of Australian music. They commenced in 1987. Dragon were inducted into the Hall of Fame in 2008.

Year	Nominee / work	Award	Result
1987	Dreams of Ordinary Men	Highest Selling Album	Nominated
1987	Dreams of Ordinary Men	Best Adult Contemporary Album	Nominated
1987	"Dreams of Ordinary Men"	Highest Selling Single	Nominated
1990	Bondi Road	Best Adult Contemporary Album	Nominated
2008	Dragon	ARIA Hall of Fame	Won

=== King of Pop Awards ===
The King of Pop Awards were voted by the readers of TV Week. The King of Pop award started in 1967 and ran through to 1978.

Year	Nominee / work	Award	Result
1977	themselves	Most Popular New Group	Won
1978	themselves	Outstanding Local Achievement	Won

=== Countdown Music Awards ===
Countdown was an Australian pop music TV series on national broadcaster ABC-TV from 1974–1987, it presented music awards from 1979–1987, initially in conjunction with magazine TV Week. The TV Week / Countdown Awards were a combination of popular-voted and peer-voted awards.

Year	Nominee / work	Award	Result
1983	"Rain"	Best Australian Single	Nominated
1984	Body and the Beat	Best Australian Album	Nominated
