= Marc Hunter =

New Zealand singer-songwriter (1953–1998)

- Born: Marc Alexander Hunter; 7 September 1953; Taumarunui, New Zealand
- Origin: Auckland, New Zealand
- Died: 17 July 1998 (aged 44) Berry, New South Wales, Australia
- Genres: Rock, pop
- Occupations: Musician, songwriter, producer
- Instruments: Vocals; drums; saxophone; percussion
- Years active: 1970–1997
- Labels: PolyGram; Mercury; ABC; Roadshow

Marc Alexander Hunter (7 September 1953 – 17 July 1998) was a New Zealand rock and pop singer, songwriter and record producer. He was the lead vocalist of Dragon (1973–11/1979, 8/1982–1989, 1995–11/1997), a band formed by his older brother, Todd Hunter, in Auckland in January 1972. They relocated to Sydney in May 1975. He was also a member of the Party Boys in 1985. For his solo career he issued five studio albums, Fiji Bitter (November 1979), Big City Talk (August 1981), Communication (September 1985), Night and Day (August 1990) and Talk to Strangers (late 1994). During the 1970s Hunter developed heroin and alcohol addictions and was incarcerated at Mt Eden Prison in Auckland in 1978. He was recklessly outspoken and volatile on-stage. In November 1978, during the band's American tour, supporting Johnny Winter, they performed in Dallas, Texas, where "he made some general stage observations about redneck buddies, illegal oral sex and utility trucks" and called the audience members "faggots". Upon his return to Australia, in February 1979, he was fired from the group by his brother, Todd.

In August 1982, Hunter returned to the line-up of Dragon and continued with the group while also maintaining his solo career. The band included Craig Laird on lead guitar (currently of 1927) and Steve Boyd on drums (ex-Adam Brand). They disbanded in November 1997 when he was diagnosed with throat cancer, and he died on 17 July 1998. Benefit concerts were held to provide for his widow, Wendy Hunter, and children. On 1 July 2008, the Australian Recording Industry Association (ARIA) inducted Dragon into their Hall of Fame. His biography, Chasing the Dragon: the Life and Death of Marc Hunter, was published by Jeff Apter in October 2011.

== Early life ==
Marc Alexander Hunter was born in Taumarunui on 7 September 1953. In the late 1950s his family performed publicly, where his father, Stuart, played saxophone; his mother, Voi, played piano; and his older brother, Todd Hunter (born 1951), played guitar, with Marc providing drums. He also grew up with two younger brothers, Ross and Brett. Hunter remembered, "We got guitars for Christmas one year, I broke mine but Todd played his. He was two years older than me and always more interested in music. I only saw it as a way of wagging school." He described his home town, "[it] was a great place to grow up in, and a great place to run away from, because you always knew you could go back to it and nothing much would have changed. It was the place where our parents always told us to 'Do what you want to do, just try and be happy doing it.'"

Hunter attended Taumarunui High School and started performing as a cabaret singer, Todd later reminisced, "Oh, he was fabulous! He was playing in cabaret lounges and entertaining all sorts of people, driving a pink Mercedes, all that sort of stuff, straight out of school!" Hunter also provided drums and vocals as a member of a band, Quintessence, which performed at a restaurant in Auckland.

== Music career ==
=== 1970–79: Dragon ===
In 1973, Hunter issued a solo single, "X-Ray Creature" (1973), on the Family Records label.

Todd, meanwhile, had formed a progressive rock band, Dragon, in January 1972 in Auckland. About a year later the group "played in the next room to [Marc] one night, and he came through and did some songs ... I think we were playing for a really tough crowd of dock-workers, it was really tough and he just swanned in and was excruciatingly funny and completely irreverent. We just thought this guy's great – he's even madder than us, we must get him!"

Marc Hunter joined Dragon in 1973 on lead vocals, percussion and saxophone, replacing their founding member singer, pianist Graeme Collins. The band recorded two progressive rock albums for Vertigo Records, their guitarist, Robert Taylor later recalled "[our gigs] weren't totally original, they were doing things like Santana and Doors songs... At that stage Marc Hunter was playing congas and I think a little bit of sax." They moved to Sydney in May 1975. They were managed by Wayne de Gruchy who told Hunter that he should "stop playing the congas, be more of a front man... Marc was more than just one of the musos." Dragon became a pop-rock act after Paul Hewson joined on keyboards in 1975. They supported Status Quo on their Australian tour in October 1975.

Dragon became one of Australia's biggest-selling bands, scoring a number of hit singles, including "April Sun in Cuba" (No. 2, November 1977) and "Are You Old Enough?" (No. 1, August 1978). Their related top 10 albums, were Running Free (No. 6, 1977) and O Zambezi (No. 3, 1978). Hunter was incarcerated in Mt Eden Prison, Auckland in 1978 due to developing heroin and alcohol addictions. He was recklessly outspoken and volatile on-stage: in November 1978 during the band's North American tour, supporting Johnny Winter, they performed in Dallas, Texas, where "he made some general stage observations about redneck buddies, illegal oral sex and utility trucks" and called the audience members, "faggots".

In February 1979 Hunter was fired from Dragon by his brother. Todd later explained, "He was demonic... Things like Dallas happened all the time. The 'Miss Mercy' mock rape thing lasted until these feminists started getting up and punching him in the face. Most of the time I wasn't drinking or anything and, from my perspective, this Fall of the Roman Empire thing was pretty wild. I hated a lot of it. People came along because they wanted to see Dragon decombust. They were enjoying it but Marc was just killing himself. We had to fire him or he'd have destroyed himself."

According to the music journalist David Nichols, in the mid-1970s, "Three of the five members of Dragon – Marc Hunter, Paul Hewson and Neil Storey – were associated with heroin selling and consumption." Indeed, Dragon were named in the 1981 Stewart Royal Commission of Inquiry into Drug Trafficking due to their association with fellow New Zealander, Greg Ollard, of the Mr Asia drug trafficking network. This international narcotics syndicate was headed by Marty Johnstone until he was murdered on orders from his trafficking partner and subordinate Terry Clark, who were both also New Zealanders. The Royal Commission reported that "Ollard supplied heroin to Dragon band members, and at least one member of the group sold heroin on Ollard's behalf." Ollard himself was also murdered in September 1977, again on Terry Clark's orders, with his body not being found for five years.

=== 1979–82: Solo Career: Fiji Bitter and Big City Talk ===
Marc Hunter travelled overseas to recuperate, visiting Morocco and London. Back in Australia he signed a recording deal with CBS, which issued his debut solo album, Fiji Bitter, in November 1979. For the sessions he used Todd on bass guitar, John Annas on drums (ex-Kevin Borich Express), Harvey James on guitar (from Sherbet), and Terry Wilson on guitar (ex-Original Battersea Heroes, Wasted Daze).

Fiji Bitter was recorded at Studios 301 in Sydney with Richard Lush producing and engineering – Hunter wrote or co-wrote most of its tracks. The album's lead single, "Island Nights" (July), peaked at No. 20. He formed Marc Hunter and the Romantics, with Annas and James, to promote the album. Two more singles, "Don't Take Me" (November) and "When You Walk in the Room" (January 1980), appeared – neither reached the top 50.

In 1980 Hunter, on lead vocals, formed an R&B group in Sydney, the Headhunters, with Todd on bass guitar (by then ex-Dragon), Kevin Borich on guitar, Mick Cocks on guitar (ex-Rose Tattoo), John Watson on drums (ex-Kevin Borich Express). Australian musicologist, Ian McFarlane, described them as "an ad hoc aggregation of musicians who were drawn together by a love of playing raucous R&B".

An encounter with Hunter in 1980, at 7am in Sydney's King's Cross, led Robert Forster of The Go-Betweens to describe how Hunter was the embodiment of a "rock star":

"He didn’t have to look so good so early – he just can’t help it...A haughtiness, a regal grab at life, a mood, that doesn’t just come on at six o’clock in the evening when showtime is close. Rock stars are ready at breakfast."

Hunter resumed his solo career with his second album, Big City Talk, which appeared in August 1981 on PolyGram/Mercury labels. It was co-produced by Hunter and Todd. Debbie Muir of The Canberra Times, felt it "covered a wide range of material that bore some resemblance to his last album, Fiji Bitter, but was totally different to his old, Dragon days." He had used session musicians: Kevin Borich, Dave Mason (of the Reels) and Mark Punch (ex-Renée Geyer Band). Muir's fellow journalist at The Canberra Times, Garry Raffaele, opined that it "is flat, directionless, unexciting, effete rock and roll. It is devoid of feeling."

On working as a solo artist, he declared, "I am happier now on my own. I was in a wretched state of mind when I was in the band... I miss the camaraderie involved but then I prefer to make my own decisions." The title track, "Big City Talk", was released as a single in July and reached No. 25. Follow up singles, "(Rock'n'Roll is) a Loser's Game" (September), "Side Show" (November) and "Nothing but a Lie" (May 1982) did not chart. In 1981 he formed the Marc Hunter Band and in October they toured Australia with Renée Geyer; the set included a duet by Hunter and Geyer. During 1982 Hunter was working with US-born keyboardist and record producer, Alan Mansfield. In March of that year he was arrested for "$4500 in unpaid parking fines", he described his jail cell as "unbelievably filthy."

=== 1982–89: Dragon reborn, Party Boys and solo Communication ===
In August 1982 Dragon reformed with the line-up of Marc, Todd, Hewson, Jacobsen and Robert Taylor on guitar (ex-Mammal) for a national Class Reunion tour. McFarlane noted that it was "Ostensibly run to pay off outstanding debts, the tour proved so successful that the band re-formed on a permanent basis." Their single, "Rain", was issued in July 1983, which peaked at No. 2. It was co-written by Marc, Todd and the latter's then-girlfriend, Johanna Pigott; and had Mansfield producing.

In June 1984 the group's next album, Body and the Beat, which was produced by Mansfield and Carey Taylor, was released and peaked at No. 5. The group provided "a much fuller, more rock-oriented sound... [it] was a polished, contemporary sounding Adult Oriented Rock album." After a tour in support of the album, Hewson left to return to New Zealand, he died of a heroin overdose in January 1985.

While on a break between Dragon tours Hunter joined the Party Boys, a "good-time rock'n'roll band" with a floating ensemble, for their Great Bars of Australia tour. The line-up of Hunter, Kevin Borich on guitar, Paul Christie on bass guitar (ex-Mondo Rock), Richard Harvey on drums (ex-Divinyls) and Joe Walsh on guitar and lead vocals (of the Eagles), recorded that group's fourth live album, You Need Professional Help (1985), during the tour.

Hunter issued his third solo album, Communication, in September 1985 with various session musicians used: Jeff "Skunk" Baxter, Kirk Lorange, Mark Punch and Peter Walker on guitars, Todd Hunter and Phil Scorgie on bass guitar, Allan Mansfield and Don Walker on keyboards, and Mark Kennedy and Ricky Fataar on drums. Mansfield produced the album, which McFarlane described as "a polished set of Adult Oriented Rock (AOR) songs." Its title track had been released as a single in 1984. Hunter returned to his duties with Dragon and was recorded on two more studio albums by the end of the decade.

=== 1989–96: Night and Day, Talk to Strangers to Dragon finale ===
Marc Hunter was invited by Australian Broadcasting Corporation's Keith Walker to contribute to a various artists' children's album, Zzzero (1989). He provided lullaby versions of Billie Holiday's "God Bless the Child" and Bob Dylan's "Forever Young". He worked with Walker producing when recording his next solo album, Night and Day (August 1990), which was "a collection of jazz and pop standards."

Late in 1994 Hunter's fifth solo album, Talk to Strangers, was released, which had Hunter co-producing with David Hirschfelder and Mark Walmsley via the Roadshow Music label. Soon after Hunter was back with Dragon to record their album, Incarnations (1995). Todd then left the band to concentrate on his work for film and television soundtracks. Dragon with Hunter and Mansfield aboard toured during 1996 with a line-up of Mike Caen on guitar, Ange Tsoitoudis on guitar, Dario Bortolin on bass guitar (ex-Scary Mother).

=== 1997–98: Night of the Hunter and death ===
In November 1997, Marc Hunter was diagnosed with throat cancer. He had felt unwell, "One doctor told Marc he probably had tonsillitis and sent him home. Unsatisfied with this diagnosis, Marc visited a throat specialist. 'The doctor felt around my throat, and said, "You have a large cancer." I sort of didn't hear anything for a minute. I was stunned. I just sat there.'"

His friends, including Renée Geyer, organised a benefit concert to raise money for his treatment and to provide for his wife and children. Geyer explained, "He's a dear old friend and he's someone who's put a lot of time and energy into the business. I just thought it would be great for the industry to give a little bit back to someone who has given so much." The concert, Night of the Hunter, was held in February 1998 at the Palais Theatre in St Kilda in Melbourne. It had various artists performing Dragon tracks: "Are You Old Enough?" by Tex Perkins and friends, Chris Wilson singing "O Zambezi", Paul Kelly and Geyer singing a duet of "I'm Still in Love with You", Snout performing "Rain" and Men at Work's Colin Hay provided a new song he wrote in Hunter's honour.

The finale, "April Sun in Cuba", was rendered by the ensemble led by John Farnham and his band, with Todd on bass guitar. The house erupted when Geyer led Hunter onto the stage where he joined in for his signature tune for what became his last stage appearance. Todd described the concert "Marc sang, maybe for the last time, that song. These musicians' incredible generosity was so phenomenal. There was a time when Marc thought nobody cared about his music. But he was amazed by what all these guys were doing, and it got to him in an incredible way."

Another benefit, the Good Vibrations concert, was staged soon after at Selina's nightclub in the Coogee Bay Hotel in Sydney's eastern suburbs. The performers included Glenn Shorrock, James Reyne, Ross Wilson, Todd Hunter, Alan Mansfield, Robert Taylor, Tommy Emmanuel, Men at Work regrouped for the first time in a decade to perform, and the remaining members of INXS performed live for the first time since the death of their lead singer, Michael Hutchence; Peter Garrett and Jimmy Barnes provided a duet on "Dreams of Ordinary Men" and "Speak no Evil". Hunter was unavailable – he was in Korea undergoing alternative therapy to prepare for a major throat operation, but he sent a letter which was read to the crowd. The gig was taped and an audio 2-CD live album, Good Vibrations – A Concert for Marc Hunter (1998), was released as well as a VHS video album of the same name.

For the last few months of his life, Hunter underwent various forms of treatment including several alternative medicine remedies – he attended a traditional Korean medicine clinic to undertake "an ancient metaphysical healing process, Qi". Hunter reflected, "I have thought a lot about the possibility of dying... Now, I believe it doesn't really matter when or where you die, but how you live your life. If somebody diagnoses you with cancer and tells you they are going to cut open your jaw and take out a tumor, you would panic unless you had something to sustain you. But my time with the Qi masters gave me a tap on the shoulder and reminded me we are spiritual beings."

He died in Berry near Kiama on 17 July 1998. A memorial service for him was held at St. Andrew's Cathedral in Sydney, followed by an all-star benefit concert to raise money to support his widow and children. A compilation CD, Forever Young, was released on Raven Records, highlighting his solo career.

Marc Hunter was buried at Gerringong Cemetery, Gerringong, New South Wales.

=== 2008-present: Hall of Fame ===
On 1 July 2008, the Australian Recording Industry Association (ARIA) recognised Dragon's iconic status when they were inducted into their Hall of Fame. At the induction ceremony they were joined on-stage by James Reyne and Ian Moss to perform "April Sun in Cuba" and "Rain":

Dragon's performance featured Ian Moss and James Reyne on vocals, alongside founding member Todd Hunter. During a fiery version of "April Sun in Cuba", the late Dragon singer Marc Hunter was incorporated into the chorus via a stirring performance video shown on a huge screen behind the band. Reyne said: "I used to go and see Dragon play in the mid to late 1970s before I even had a proper band, so it's great to be able to do this. I'm a big Dragon fan, and did tours with them when Marc was alive, and I knew him quite well. He'd think this is a blast."

— Andrew Murfett, James Reyne, Todd Hunter, 2 July 2008

== Personal life ==
Annie Burton, a rock music writer for Rock Australia Magazine, had a nine-year domestic relationship with Marc Hunter from mid-1975. By the mid-1980s, they had separated and shared custody of their child. In 1985, he shared a house with Renée Geyer.

In the late 1980s, Hunter married Wendy Heather, a fashion designer, and the couple had two children, Isabella and Jackson. Isabella "Bella" Hunter covered Dragon's song "April Sun in Cuba", in February 2009 for RocKwiz Salutes the Bowl (March 2009) – a celebration of the Myer Music Bowl's 50th anniversary – on an episode of season six of the SBS program, RocKwiz. Live performances by various artists were also released as a DVD of the same name. She was a contestant on season four of the Australian version of The X Factor, in August 2012 but she was eliminated before the finals.

In October 2011 Hunter's biography, Chasing the Dragon: the Life and Death of Marc Hunter, was published by Jeff Apter. Fiona Scott-Norman of The Sydney Morning Herald felt it "should be a classic modern-day tragedy" as Hunter provided "an embarrassment of talent and charisma, held the promise of greatness in his hands and pissed it all away through heroin, narcissism and self-sabotage. He died at 44 from throat cancer and it's a toss-up which of his addictions was to blame." However, she felt that Apter's presentation was "a utilitarian read that feels like it's been knocked out pretty quickly... Hunter is never likeable, or even knowable. He got lost early on, from the minute Dragon hit Sydney and heroin in 1975 and Apter does not find him." Simon Collins of The West Australian reviewed several rock music biographies, he noticed that Apter "spoke to dozens of family and friends, including a who's who of Australian rock in the 70s and 80s." Apter portrayed Hunter as someone who "could be a horrendous human being, some sort of supernatural charisma the only explanation for the almost universal love for the larger-than-life antipodean superstar. Heroin, booze and women feature in equally gargantuan proportions"; however, the biography, "lacks the real passion that underpins some of the great rock books."

In 2023, Hunter's daughter, Bella, married billionaire Restoration Hardware CEO Gary Friedman.

== Solo discography ==
=== Albums ===
List of Albums, with release date and label shown
Title	Album details	Peak chart positions
Title	Album details	AUS
Fiji Bitter	Released: November 1979; Label: CBS; Format: LP, Cassette	54
Big City Talk	Released: August 1981; Label: Mercury; Format: LP, Cassette	54
Communication	Released: September 1985; Label: Polygram; Format: LP, Cassette	-
Night and Day	Released: July 1990; Label: ABC Music; Format: LP, CD	54
Talk to Strangers	Released: 1994; Label: Roadshow Music; Format: LP, CD	116
Forever Young: The Solo Recordings 1979-1995	Released: 2000; Label: Raven Records; Format: CD; Compilation	-

=== Charting singles ===
List of promotional singles, with selected chart positions
Title	Year	Peak chart positions	Album
Title	Year	AUS	Album
"Island Night"	1979	22	Fiji Bitter
"Don't Take Me"	1979	80	Fiji Bitter
"Big City Talk"	1981	41	Big City Talk
"Communication"	1984	78	Communication
"Get So Rough"	1994	115	Talk to Strangers

== Awards ==
=== Aotearoa Music Awards ===
The Aotearoa Music Awards (previously known as New Zealand Music Awards (NZMA)) are an annual awards night celebrating excellence in New Zealand music and have been presented annually since 1965.

Year	Nominee / work	Award	Result	Ref.
2011	Marc Hunter (as part of Dragon)	New Zealand Music Hall of Fame	inductee	

=== ARIA Music Awards ===
The ARIA Music Awards is an annual awards ceremony that recognises excellence, innovation, and achievement across all genres of Australian music. They commenced in 1987. Dragon were inducted into the Hall of Fame in 2008.

Year	Nominee / work	Award	Result
1991	Night & Day	Best Adult Contemporary Album	Nominated
2008	Marc Hunter (as part of Dragon)	ARIA Hall of Fame	inducted
