= John Farnham discography =

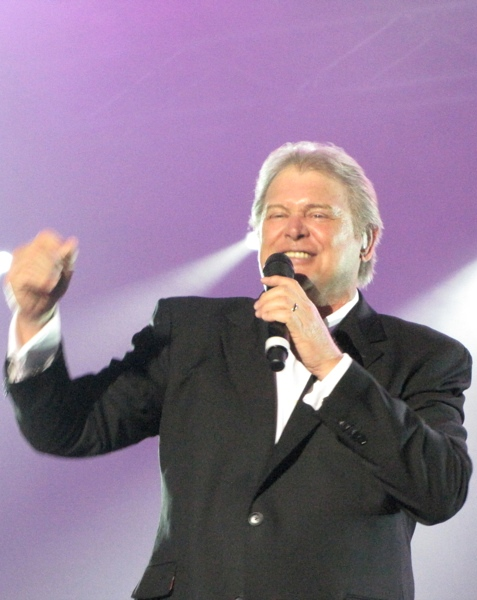
- Studio albums: 21
- Extended plays: 3
- Soundtrack albums: 3
- Live albums: 6
- Compilation albums: 19
- Singles: 74
- Video albums: 13

John Farnham, billed under stage name Johnny Farnham from 1964 until 1979, is a British-born Australian pop singer who has released 21 studio albums, 6 live albums, 3 soundtracks, 19 compilation albums, 13 video albums, 3 extended plays and 74 singles.

Manager Kenn Brodziak changed his stage name to John Farnham in 1980, and he released his first album under this banner Uncovered, featuring his version of The Beatles hit single "Help!". His career has mostly been as a solo artist but he replaced Glenn Shorrock as lead singer of Little River Band during 1982–1985. Aside from solo releases, Farnham has recorded albums and duets with other artists or bands, including Tom Jones and Olivia Newton-John.

== Background ==
Farnham was vocalist for The Mavericks from 1964, by late 1965 he had joined Strings Unlimited, In 1966, they recorded a three-track demo tape with Farnham on vocals, Stewart Male on lead guitar, Barry Roy on rhythm guitar, Mike Foenander on keyboards and Peter Foggie on drums. Talent manager, Darryl Sambell, saw Strings Unlimited perform on 29 April 1967 and encouraged Farnham to go solo. Farnham recorded an advertising jingle, "Susan Jones", for airline, Ansett-ANA, and signed a contract with EMI. Farnham's debut single was a novelty song, "Sadie (The Cleaning Lady)", released in November 1967. His debut extended play, Johnny Farnham, followed in December, and his single peaked at No. 1 on the Australian National Singles Charts for five weeks in early 1968. Selling 180,000 copies in Australia, "Sadie" was the highest selling single by an Australian artist of the decade. Farnham's debut studio album, Sadie was issued in April 1968. Other No. 1 singles are "Raindrops Keep Fallin' on My Head" in 1969–1970, "You're the Voice" in 1986 and "Age of Reason" in 1988; and his No. 1 albums are Whispering Jack in 1986–1987, Age of Reason in 1988, Chain Reaction in 1990, Then Again in 1993, Anthology 1: Greatest Hits 1986-1997 in 1997, Highlights from The Main Event with Olivia Newton-John and with Anthony Warlow in 1998, 33⅓ in 2000, The Last Time in 2002 and in 2015 and Friends for Christmas.

== Albums ==
=== Studio albums ===
List of studio albums, with selected chart positions and certifications
Title	Details	Peak chart positions						Certifications (sales thresholds)
Title	Details	AUS	NOR	NZL	SWE	SWI	UK	Certifications (sales thresholds)
Released as Johnny Farnham (1964–1979)
Sadie	Released: April 1968; Label: EMI/Columbia (OSX-7854); Producer: David Mackay; Formats: LP	—	—	—	—	—	—	
Everybody Oughta Sing a Song	Released: November 1968; Label: EMI/Columbia (SOEX-7891); Producer: David MacKay; Formats: LP	12	—	—	—	—	—	
Looking Through a Tear	Released: July 1970; Label: EMI/Columbia (SCXO-7920); Producer: Howard Gable; Formats: LP	11	—	—	—	—	—	
Christmas Is... Johnny Farnham (Note: Re-released by John Farnham as Memories of Christmas in 1995 and 1997, each time with a different cover.)	Released: December 1970; Label: EMI/Columbia (SOEX-9700); Producer: Howard Gable; Formats: LP	—	—	—	—	—	—	
Johnny	Released: August 1971; Label: His Master's Voice/Columbia (OSCD-7680); Producer: Howard Gable; Formats: LP	24	—	—	—	—	—	
Together (with Allison Durbin)	Released: August 1971; Label: His Master's Voice/Columbia (OCSD-7682); Producer: Howard Gable; Formats: LP	22	—	—	—	—	—	
Johnny Farnham Sings the Shows	Released: June 1972; Label: Axis (Axis 6000); Producer: Howard Gable; Formats: LP	—	—	—	—	—	—	
Hits Magic & Rock 'N Roll	Released: June 1973; Label: EMI (EMC-2502); Producer: Peter Dawkins; Formats: LP	—	—	—	—	—	—	
Johnny Farnham Sings Hits from the Movies	Released: September 1974; Label: EMI (SOELP-10018); Producer: Peter Dawkins; Formats: LP	—	—	—	—	—	—	
J.P. Farnham Sings	Released: November 1975; Label: EMI (EMA-310); Producer: Peter Dawkins; Formats: LP	—	—	—	—	—	—	
Released as John Farnham (1980–present)
Uncovered	Released: 3 July 1980; Label: Wheatley Brothers, RCA/Sony BMG (WBEX-1002); Producer: Graham Goble; Formats: LP, MC	20	—	—	—	—	–	AUS: Gold
Whispering Jack	Released: 29 September 1986; Label: Wheatley, Starcall, RCA/Sony BMG (SFL1-0149); Producer: Ross Fraser; Formats: LP, MC, CD	1	12	2	1	3	35	AUS: 24× Platinum; NZ: Platinum
Age of Reason	Released: 25 July 1988; Label: RCA/Sony BMG (SFL1-0168); Producer: Ross Fraser; Formats: LP, MC, CD	1	9	6	4	—	—	AUS: 8× Platinum; NZ: Platinum
Chain Reaction	Released: 24 September 1990; Label: RCA/Sony BMG (VPL1-0830); Producer: Ross Fraser; Formats: LP, MC, CD	1	—	8	35	—	—	AUS: 8× Platinum; NZ: Gold
Then Again...	Released: 18 October 1993; Label: RCA/Sony BMG (74321166652); Producer: Ross Fraser; Formats: MC, CD	1	—	34	—	—	—	AUS: 4× Platinum
Romeo's Heart	Released: 3 June 1996; Label: RCA/Sony BMG (74321373002); Producer: Ross Fraser; Formats: MC, CD	2	—	—	—	—	—	AUS: 4× Platinum
33⅓	Released: 7 July 2000; Label: RCA/Sony BMG (74321773912); Producer: Ross Fraser, John Farnham; Formats: CD, digital	1	—	—	—	—	—	AUS: 3× Platinum
The Last Time	Released: 7 October 2002; Label: RCA, Sony BMG, Gotham (74321969012); Producer: Ross Fraser, John Farnham; Formats: CD, digital	1	—	—	—	—	—	AUS: 3× Platinum
I Remember When I Was Young	Released: 6 November 2005; Label: RCA, Sony BMG, Gotham (82876747652); Producer: Ross Fraser, John Farnham; Formats: CD	2	—	—	—	—	—	AUS: 2× Platinum
Jack	Released: 15 October 2010; Label: Sony BMG (88697751692); Producer: Ross Fraser, John Farnham; Formats: CD, digital	2	—	—	—	—	—	AUS: Gold
Friends for Christmas (with Olivia Newton-John)	Released: 11 November 2016; Label: Sony Music Australia (88985387172); Producer: Chong Lim; Formats: CD, digital	1	—	—	—	—	—	AUS: 2× Platinum
"—" denotes releases that did not chart or were not released in that region.

=== Live albums ===
List of live albums, with selected chart positions and certifications
Year	Details	Peak chart positions			Certifications (sales thresholds)
Year	Details	AUS	NOR	NZL	Certifications (sales thresholds)
Released as Johnny Farnham (1964–1979)
Johnny Farnham Sings the Big Hits of '73 Live! (Note: Recorded live at Armstrong's Studios on 29 September 1973.)	Released: October 1973; Label: EMI (EMC-2506); Producer: Peter Dawkins; Formats: LP	45	—	—	
Released as John Farnham (1980–present)
Full House	Released: 4 November 1991; Label: Sony BMG, RCA, Wheatley (VPCD-0843); Producer: Ross Fraser, John Farnham; Formats: MC, CD	2	11	16	AUS: 5× Platinum
Highlights from The Main Event (Note: Recorded on 28 October 1998 at Melbourne Park as part of The Main Event Tour with Olivia Newton-John, Farnham and Anthony Warlow.) (with Olivia Newton-John and Anthony Warlow)	Released: 14 December 1998; Label: Sony BMG (74321638832); Producer: Ross Fraser; Formats: CD	1	—	—	AUS: 5× Platinum
Live at the Regent Theatre – 1st July 1999	Released: 30 August 1999; Label: Sony BMG, RCA, Gotham (74321699032); Producer: Ross Fraser; Formats: CD	7	—	—	AUS: Platinum
John Farnham & Tom Jones – Together in Concert (Note: Recorded in February 1999, at Melbourne Park as part of the Together in Concert Tour with Tom Jones.) (with Tom Jones)	Released: 20 March 2005; Label: Sony BMG (82876682212); Producer: Ross Fraser; Formats: CD	3	—	—	AUS: Platinum
The Acoustic Chapel Sessions	Released: 30 September 2011; Label: Sony BMG (88697969872); Producer: Ross Fraser; Formats: CD+DVD, digital download	10	—	—	
Highlights from Two Strong Hearts: Live (with Olivia Newton-John)	Released: 26 June 2015; Label: Sony BMG (88875103742); Formats: CD, digital download	1	—	—	AUS: Gold; NZ: Gold
"—" denotes releases that did not chart or were not released in that region.

=== Soundtrack albums ===
List of soundtrack albums, as lead artist, with selected chart positions and certifications
Title	Details	Peak chart positions	Certifications (sales thresholds)
Title	Details	AUS	Certifications (sales thresholds)
Released as Johnny Farnham (1964–1979)
Charlie Girl (with Anna Neagle and Derek Nimmo)	Released: May 1972; Label: His Master's Voice; Format: LP	29	
Pippin (with Colleen Hewett)	Released: July 1974; Label: EMI; Format: LP	60	
Released as John Farnham (1980–present)
Jesus Christ Superstar (with Kate Ceberano and Jon Stevens)	Released: 6 July 1992; Label: Mushroom; Format: CD, cassette	1	AUS: 4× Platinum
Finding the Voice: Music from the Feature Documentary (with various artists)	Released: 19 May 2023; Label: Wheatley, Sony; Format: CD, digital	2	

=== Compilation albums ===
List of compilation albums, with selected chart positions and certifications
Title	Details	Peak chart positions			Certifications (sales thresholds)
Title	Details	AUS	GER	NZL	Certifications (sales thresholds)
Released as Johnny Farnham (1967–1979)
The Best of Johnny Farnham	Released: 1971; Label: WRC (S/4875); Formats: LP	—	—	—	
Johnny Farnham's Greatest Hits	Released: 1976; Label: WRC/EMI (04643); Formats: LP	—	—	—	
Released as John Farnham (1980–present)
The Best of John Farnham	Released: 1980; Label: Axis (AX-430007); Formats: LP	—	—	—	
John Farnham Phenomenon (18 Farnham Classics)	Released: May 1987; Label: J&B (JB300); Formats: LP, cassette	44	—	—	
Another Side of John Farnham	Released: 1987; Label: Axis (AX-701355); Formats: LP, CD, cassette	—	—	—	
Time Brings Change	Released: 1988; Label: Axis (AX-701443); Formats: LP, CD, cassette	—	—	—	
Where Do I Begin?	Released: 1995; Label: EMI (8145732); Formats: CD	—	—	—	
The Classic Gold Collection – Through the Years (1967–1985)	Released: 6 November 1995; Label: EMI (8145802); Formats: CD	—	—	—	
Johnny Farnham	Released: 1995; Label: EMI (8146482); Formats: CD	—	—	—	
Anthology 1: Greatest Hits 1986–1997 aka Greatest Hits	Released: 29 September 1997; Label: Sony BMG (74321518692); Formats: CD, cassette, digital	1	40	13	AUS: 5× Platinum; NZ: Gold
Anthology 2: Classic Hits 1967–1985 (Recorded Live)	Released: 29 September 1997; Label: Sony BMG (74321518702); Formats: CD, cassette	12	—	—	AUS: Platinum
Anthology 3: Rarities	Released: 10 November 1997; Label: Sony BMG (74321518712); Formats: CD	20	—	—	AUS: Gold
Love Songs	Released: July 2002 (Europe only); Label: Sony BMG (74321916842); Formats: CD	—N/a	—	—N/a	
One Voice: The Greatest Hits	Released: 20 October 2003; Label: Sony BMG (82876556482); Formats: 2×CD, digital	2	—	29	AUS: 4× Platinum
Collections	Released: 12 October 2008; Label: Sony BMG (88697375442); Formats: CD	—	—	—	
Essential: John Farnham	Released: 31 January 2009; Label: EMI (2426622); Formats: CD, digital	—	—	—	
The Essential John Farnham aka The Essential 3.0	Released: 21 August 2009; Label: Sony BMG (88697553842); Formats: 3×CD, digital	6	—	—	ARIA: Gold
"—" denotes releases that did not chart or were not released in that region.

=== Video albums ===
Title	Details	Peak chart positions	Certifications (sales thresholds)	Notes
Title	Details	AUS	Certifications (sales thresholds)	Notes
Whispering Jack – Live in Concert	Released: 1987; Label: BMG; Producer: David Mackay; Formats: TV, VHS (PAL)	—N/a	AUS: Gold	Recorded live at the Melbourne Sports and Entertainment Centre, Melbourne in March 1987 and was broadcast on national TV. An edited VHS version (100 min) was released later in 1987. An even further edited DVD version (68 min) was included on the 20th Anniversary re-release of Whispering Jack on 25 November 2006.
Classic Jack Live!	Released: July 1989; Label: BMG; Producer: David Mackay; Formats: TV, VHS (PAL)	6 (Note: Classic Jack peaked at number 6 in 2005)	AUS: 2× Platinum	Recorded during the Age of Reason National Tour live from National Tennis Centre, Melbourne and televised in May 1989 on Seven Network, an edited VHS version (90 min) was released in July. Recorded with the Melbourne Symphony Orchestra. Re-released on DVD (PAL) on 13 November 2005.
Chain Reaction Live In Concert	Released: 1990; Label: BMG; Producer: David Mackay; Formats: TV, VHS (PAL)	5 (Note: Chain Reaction Live In Concert peaked at number 5 in 2005)	AUS: 2× Platinum	Recorded during the Chain Reaction National Tour live from National Tennis Centre, Melbourne and televised in 1990 on Seven Network, an edited VHS version (110 min) was released. Re-released on DVD (PAL) on 13 November 2005.
Talk of the Town Tour	Released: 1994; Label: BMG; Producer: David Mackay; Formats: TV, VHS (PAL)	—N/a		Recorded during the Talk of the Town Tour in support of Then Again..., live from National Tennis Centre, Melbourne and televised on Seven Network in 1994, an edited VHS version (110 min) was released.
The Main Event	Released: December 1998; Label: Roadshow; Producer: David Mackay; Formats: TV, VHS (PAL), DVD (PAL)	—N/a		Recorded on 8 December 1998 of The Main Event Tour with Olivia Newton-John and Anthony Warlow and televised on Seven Network. VHS and DVD versions (159 min) released in December.
Anthology 1 – The Videos	Released: 1999; Label: BMG; Producer: David Mackay; Formats: VHS (PAL)	—N/a		Collection of Farnham's music videos during 1986–1997.
33⅓	Released: May 2001; Label: BMG; Producer: David Mackay; Formats: VHS (PAL), DVD (PAL)	2		Released in support of 33⅓, with live performances in the studio, interviews and "The Making of 33⅓".
An Audience with John Farnham	Released: 9 December 2002; Label: BMG; Formats: TV, DVD (PAL)	9	AUS: Gold	Filmed on 23 October 2002 in front of an audience of friends and family at Seven Network's Studios in Melbourne, backstage footage added.
The Last Time	Released: July 2003; Label: BMG; Formats: TV, VHS (PAL), DVD (PAL)	1	AUS: 5× Platinum	Filmed on 15 June 2003 at Rod Laver Arena, Melbourne, of the final show in The Last Time Tour, behind the scenes footage added.
One Voice: The Greatest Clips	Released: 1 December 2003; Label: BMG; Formats: VHS (PAL), DVD (PAL)	2	AUS: 5× Platinum	Collection of Farnham's music videos and rare footage.
John Farnham & Tom Jones – Together in Concert (with Tom Jones)	Released: 24 April 2005; Label: Sony BMG; Formats: DVD (PAL)	1	AUS: 5× Platinum	Filmed in early 2005 of a performance by Farnham & Tom Jones as part of their Together in Concert Tour.
John Farnham with the Sydney Symphony Live at the Sydney Opera House	Released: March 2006; Label: Sony BMG; Formats: TV, DVD (PAL)	1	AUS: 2× Platinum	Filmed in early 2006 of a performance by Farnham & Sydney Symphony Orchestra at the Sydney Opera House, televised on Nine Network.
Two Strong Hearts Live (with Olivia Newton-John)	Released: 2015; Label: Sony BMG; Formats: DVD	1	AUS: Platinum	Recorded at Rod Laver Arena on 8 April 2015
"—" denotes releases that did not chart or were not released in that region.

== Extended plays ==
List of EPs, with selected details
Title	Details
Released as Johnny Farnham (1964–1979)
Johnny Farnham	Released: December 1967; Label: EMI/Columbia (SEGO-70168); Producer: David Mackay; Formats: LP
Number One	Released: 1970; Label: EMI/Columbia (SEGO-70185); Producer: David Mackay; Formats: LP
Released as John Farnham (1980–present)
Fight for Survival – The Concert for Rwanda	Released: September 1994; Label: BMG, Gotham (74321232392); Producer: Ross Fraser; Formats: CD

== Singles ==
List of singles between 1967 and 1973 with selected chart positions
Title	Year	Chart positions	Sales	Album
Title	Year	AUS	Sales	Album
"Sadie (The Cleaning Lady)" / "In My Room"	1967	1	AUS: 183,000	Johnny Farnham (EP) / Sadie
"Underneath the Arches" / "Friday Kind of Monday"	1968	6		Johnny Farnham (EP) / Sadie
"Jamie" / "I Don't Want to Love You"	1968	8		Everybody Oughta Sing a Song
"Rose Coloured Glasses"	1968	16		Everybody Oughta Sing a Song
"I Saw Mommy Kissing Santa Claus"	1968	—		Non-album single
"One" / "Mr. Whippy"	1969	4		Looking Through a Tear
"Raindrops Keep Fallin' on My Head"	1969	1		Looking Through a Tear
"Comic Conversation"	1970	10		Non-album single
"Christmas Happy"	1970	—		Christmas Is Johnny Farnham
"Acapulco Sun"	1971	21		Non-album single
"Baby, Without You" (with Allison Durbin)	1971	16		Together
"Walking the Floor on My Hands"	1971	25		Non-album singles
"For Christ's Sake Help the Kids"	1972	—		Non-album singles
"Rock Me Baby"	1972	4		Non-album singles
"Charlie Girl"	1972	—		Johnny Farnham Sings the Shows
"Don't You Know It's Magic"	1972	12		Hits, Magic & Rock 'N Roll
"Everything Is Out of Season"	1973	8		Hits, Magic & Rock 'N Roll
"I Can't Dance to Your Music"	1973	12		Non-album singles
"Shake a Hand"	1973	24		Non-album singles

List of singles between 1974 and 1985 with selected chart positions
Title	Year	Chart positions	Album
Title	Year	AUS	Album
"Corner of the Sky"	1974	—	Pippin
"One Minute Every Hour"	1974	91	Non-album single
"Things to Do"	1975	88	JP Farnham Sings
"Don't Rock the Boat"	1975	—	JP Farnham Sings
"You Love Me Back to Life Again"	1976	—	Non-album singles
"Rock and Roll Hall of Fame"	1977	—	Non-album singles
"Help!"	1980	8	Uncovered
"She's Everywhere"	1980	90	Uncovered
"Please Don't Ask Me"	1981	67	Uncovered
"Too Much Too Soon"	1981	82	Non-album singles
"That's No Way to Love Someone"	1981	52	Non-album singles
"Nothing's Gonna Stand in Our Way" (Germany and Mexico only)	1984	—	Savage Streets
"Justice for One"	1984	—	Savage Streets
"Love (It's Just the Way It Goes)" (with Sarah M Taylor)	1985	—	The Slugger's Wife

List of singles between 1986 and 1993 with selected chart positions
Title	Year	Chart positions										Certification	Album
Title	Year	AUS	AUT	CAN	GER	NLD	NZL	SWE	SWI	UK	US	Certification	Album
"Break the Ice"	1986	—	—	—	—	—	—	—	—	—	—		Rad
"You're the Voice"	1986	1	6	12	1	18	13	1	3	6	82	ARIA: 8× Platinum; BPI: Platinum; GLF: Gold; IFPI: Gold; RMNZ: 3× Platinum	Whispering Jack
"Pressure Down"	1986	4	—	70	32	99	8	11	—	78	—	RMNZ: Gold	Whispering Jack
"A Touch of Paradise"	1987	24	—	—	—	—	47	—	—	—	—	RMNZ: Gold	Whispering Jack
"Reasons"	1987	60	—	—	—	—	—	—	—	—	—		Whispering Jack
"Age of Reason"	1988	1	—	25	20	43	4	—	—	87	—		Age of Reason
"Two Strong Hearts"	1988	6	—	50	—	43	28	—	—	80	—	RMNZ: Platinum	Age of Reason
"Beyond the Call"	1988	40	—	—	—	—	—	—	—	—	—		Age of Reason
"We're No Angels"	1989	108	—	—	—	—	—	—	—	—	—		Age of Reason
"Communication" (with Dannielle Gaha)	1989	13	—	—	—	—	—	—	—	—	—		Non-album single
"Chain Reaction"	1990	6	—	—	—	79	21	—	—	—	—	ARIA: Gold	Chain Reaction
"That's Freedom"	1990	6	—	22	56	52	—	—	—	—	—	ARIA: Gold	Chain Reaction
"Burn for You"	1990	5	—	—	—	—	—	—	—	—	—	ARIA: Gold	Chain Reaction
"In Days to Come"	1991	49	—	—	—	79	—	—	—	—	—		Chain Reaction
"When Something Is Wrong with My Baby" (with Jimmy Barnes)	1991	3	—	—	—	—	6	—	—	—	—	ARIA: Platinum; RIANZ: Gold	Soul Deep
"Please Don't Ask Me" (live)	1991	22	—	—	—	—	—	—	—	—	—		Full House
"Help!" (live) (Germany only)	1992	—	—	—	—	—	—	—	—	—	—		Full House
"You're the Voice" (live) (Germany only)	1992	—	—	—	—	—	—	—	—	—	—		Full House
"Everything's Alright" (with Kate Ceberano and Jon Stevens)	1992	6	—	—	—	—	—	—	—	—	—	ARIA: Gold	Jesus Christ Superstar
"Seemed Like a Good Idea (At the Time)"	1993	16	—	—	59	—	—	—	—	—	—		Then Again...
"Angels"	1993	36	—	—	—	—	—	—	—	—	—		Then Again...

List of singles from 1994, with selected chart positions
Title	Year	Chart positions	Certification	Album
Title	Year	AUS	Certification	Album
"Talk of the Town"	1994	61		Then Again...
"The Reason Why"	1994	116		Then Again...
"Have a Little Faith"	1996	3		Romeo's Heart
"A Simple Life"	1996	29		Romeo's Heart
"Heart's on Fire"	1996	50		Romeo's Heart
"Don't Let It End"	1996	66		Romeo's Heart
"All Kinds of People"	1997	191		Romeo's Heart
"Everytime You Cry" (with Human Nature)	1997	3	ARIA: Platinum	Anthology 1: Greatest Hits 1986–1997
"Trying to Live My Life Without You"	2000	42		33⅓
"Dare to Dream" (with Olivia Newton-John)	2000	(promo)		Official Music from the Opening Ceremony – Sydney 2000
"Man of the Hour"	2000	128		33⅓
"You're the Only One"	2001	—		33⅓
"The Last Time"	2002	(promo)		The Last Time
"Keep Talking"	2002	65		The Last Time
"No Ordinary World"	2003	(promo)		The Last Time
"We Will Rock You" (with Queen)	2003	(promo)		One Voice: The Greatest Hits
"Downhearted"	2005	(promo)		I Remember When I Was Young
"Even When I'm Sleeping"	2005	(promo)		I Remember When I Was Young
"Hit the Road Jack" / "Fever"	2010	—		Jack

== Guest appearances ==
List of other non-single song appearances
Title	Year	Album
"Things Go Better with Coca-Cola"	1968	A Groovin' with Coca-Cola
"My World Is Empty Without You" (with Rainey Haynes)	1984	Voyage of the Rock Aliens (soundtrack)
"Innocent Hearts"	1984	Savage Streets (soundtrack)
"The Quiet Ones You Gotta Watch"	1984	Savage Streets (soundtrack)
"Running for Love"	1985	Fletch (soundtrack)
"Thunder in Your Heart"	1986	Rad (soundtrack)
"Santa Claus Is Coming to Town"	1986	The Christmas Album
"When Something Is Wrong with My Baby" (live) (with Jimmy Barnes)	1991	Live at the Palais 1991
"The Full House Mega Mix" (by Brahms 4 featuring The Music of John Farnham) (Note: "The Full House Mega Mix" is a megamix of several of Farnham's singles, and peaked at number 109 on the ARIA Chart.)	1992	Non-album single
"You're the Voice" (live)	1993	The Best of the Prince's Trust Concerts
"You'll Never Walk Alone"	1993	The Spirit of Christmas
"Amazing Grace"	1994	The Spirit of Christmas '94
"Cool Water" (with Smokey Dawson)	1995	Ridin' All Over Again
"Showing We Care"	1995	I Can Do That
"Rock Me Baby"	1996	John Bromell - What a Great Guy!
"Don't Let It End"	1996	Santa's Hit List
"The Little Boy that Santa Claus Forgot"	1996	The Spirit of Christmas '96
"Advance Australia Fair"	1997	Anthem - Celebration of Australia
"A Whiter Shade of Pale" (Mike Batt & the Royal Philharmonic Orchestra)	1998	Philharmania
"When All Else Fails"	1998	The Real Macaw (soundtrack)
"Small One"	1999	The Spirit of Christmas 1999
"Black Dog"	2000	102 Dalmatians (soundtrack)
"Love's in Need of Love Today"	2003	The Spirit of Christmas 2003
"One Little Christmas Tree"	2005	The Spirit of Christmas 2005
"I Remember When I Was Young" (live)	2006	Sunrise Live - The Concert Series
"Two Strong Hearts" (with Olivia Newton-John)	2020	Artists Unite for Fire Fight
"You're the Voice" (with Olivia Newton-John, Mitch Tambo and Brian May)	2020	Artists Unite for Fire Fight
"She's So Fine" / "Sorry" (with Doc Nelson)	2024	Tour of Duty – Concert for the Troops (Live in Dili 1999)
"Shout" (with Kylie Minogue)	2024	Tour of Duty – Concert for the Troops (Live in Dili 1999)
"Chain Reaction", "Have A Little Faith", "Playing to Win", "Sadie", "That’s Freedom", "You’ll Never Walk Alone"	2024	Tour of Duty – Concert for the Troops (Live in Dili 1999)
"You’re the Voice", "It's a Long Way to the Top", "Take a Long Line", "Will I Ever See Your Face Again", "I Still Call Australia Home" (with everyone)	2024	Tour of Duty – Concert for the Troops (Live in Dili 1999)

== See also ==
- Little River Band discography
