= Everybody Oughta Sing a Song =

Everybody Oughta Sing A Song

Studio album by Johnny Farnham
- Released: November 1968
- Recorded: April–August 1968
- Genre: Pop
- Labels: EMI, Columbia
- Producer: David Mackay

Johnny Farnham chronology
Sadie (1968)	Everybody Oughta Sing A Song (1968)	Looking Through a Tear (1970)

Singles from Everybody Oughta Sing A Song
- 1. "Jamie"/"I Don't Want To Love You"" Released: July 1968; 2. "Rose Coloured Glasses" Released: October 1968

1974 Re-release
- Alternative cover for "Everybody Oughta Sing A Song."

Everybody Oughta Sing A Song is the second solo studio album by Australian pop singer John Farnham (billed then as Johnny Farnham) and was released on EMI Records in November 1968. Its first single, released in July, was the double A-sided, "Jamie"/"I Don't Want To Love You", which peaked at No. 8 on the Go-Set National Singles Charts. The second single, "Rose Coloured Glasses" was released in October and peaked at No. 16. Writers on the album included Hans Poulsen, Neil Diamond and Quincy Jones. The album was re-released in 1974 with a different cover, it shows Farnham performing live on stage, whereas the initial 1968 release had him leaning against a Holden Monaro (see infobox at right).

== Background ==
Johnny Farnham's first commercially successful solo recording was the novelty song entitled "Sadie (The Cleaning Lady)", his manager, Darryl Sambell had disliked it as the lyrics were so persistent. However, EMI's in house producer, David Mackay, insisted and so the single was released in November 1967. "Sadie" hit No. 1 on the Go-Set National Singles Charts in January 1968 and remained there for five weeks. Selling 180 000 copies in Australia, "Sadie" was the highest selling single by an Australian artist of the decade. Farnham's first album, Sadie, produced by Mackay was released in April. Almost immediately, Farnham was recording his second album, Everybody Oughta Sing A Song with Mackay producing. The first single from the album was released in July, the double A-sided, "Jamie" / "I Don't Want To Love You" which peaked at No. 8. It was followed by the second single, "Rose Coloured Glasses" which peaked at No. 16. while the album itself was released in November.

== Track listing ==
Side A

1. "Everybody Oughta Sing a Song" (Dallas Frazier) – 2:18
2. "Jamie" (Hans Poulsen) – 2:28
3. "There Is No Season to My Love" (Quincy Jones, Dorothy Fields) – 2:24
4. "Two-Bit Manchild" (Neil Diamond) – 3:01
5. "The Last Thing on My Mind" (Tom Paxton) – 3:27
6. "Strollin'" (Ralph Reader) – 1:59
7. "Scratchin' Ma Head" (Guy Fletcher, Doug Flett) – 2:07

Side B

1. "I Don't Want To Love You" (Don Everly, Phil Everly) – 2:48
2. "Confidentially" (Reg Dixon) – 2:03
3. "Rose Coloured Glasses" (Hans Poulsen) – 2:49
4. "Grand Unspeakable Passion" (Peter Best) – 2:12
5. "Sunday Will Never Be The Same" (Eugene Pistilli, Terry Cashman) – 2:58
6. "You Can Write a Song" (Roger Cook, John Neel) – 2:38
