= John Farnham: Finding the Voice =

- Theatrical film poster
- Directed by: Poppy Stockell
- Written by: Poppy Stockell
- Produced by: Mikael Borglund; Paul Clarke; Martin Fabinyi; Olivia Hoopmann; Elizabeth Daley
- Starring: John Farnham
- Cinematography: Aaron Smith
- Edited by: Scott Gray; Steven Robinson
- Production companies: Beyond Oz Pty Ltd; Finding the Voice Pty Ltd; Blink TV Pty Ltd
- Distributed by: Sony Pictures Releasing International
- Release date: 18 May 2023
- Running time: 96 mins
- Country: Australia
- Language: English

John Farnham: Finding the Voice is a 2023 Australian documentary film following recording artist John Farnham's career in an authorised biopic. The film's trailer was released on 11 April 2023 whilst the film was released in Australian cinemas on 18 May 2023. It was broadcast on the Seven Network on 24 July 2023.

The film includes commentary from Jimmy Barnes, Daryl Braithwaite, Celine Dion, Tommy Emmanuel, Brett Garsed, Graeham Goble, Bev Harrell, Richard Marx, Olivia Newton-John, Robbie Williams and Glenn Wheatley.

The film is the biggest theatrical Australian music documentary (excl. Imax), exceeding $2.57 million in its second weekend.

The television premiere on 24 July 2023 had 866,000 viewers across the five city metro spread, and was the third most viewed program of the evening.

At the 2023 ARIA Music Awards, the soundtrack won the ARIA Award for Best Original Soundtrack, Cast or Show Album.

At the 2024 AACTA Awards, the documentary won the ACCTA Award for Best Documentary.

== Critical response ==
On review aggregator website Rotten Tomatoes, the film has an approval rating of 92% based on twelve reviews. Reviewer Jim Schembri notes "A fitting, lovingly made tribute to a singer who evolved into the definitive Australian pop artist...a very good, richly detailed biographical documentary that chronicles Farnham's stellar, decidedly bumpy career."

Sandra Hall from Sydney Morning Herald gave the film 4 out of 5 stars saying "Reality rarely produces biographies that fit neatly into three acts, but John Farnham's life so far is a stirring exception. Success came early to him, followed by a midlife slump and a triumphant comeback. It's a story with everything – laughter, tears, love and rock 'n' roll... [and the documentary] captures it all, with Farnham's large roster of friends taking an obvious delight in reminiscing about times spent with a man they both like and admire."

Peter Gray from The AU Review gave the film 4 out of 5 stars saying "'Finding the Voice' finds the love for its subject and envelops his presence, and in a day and age where talent is fleeting and prominence is temporary, there's a warmth in being reminded of longevity and the facility behind it."

David Michael Brown from Flicks said it "Traces the singer's life and career, his journey to find an artistic voice and become one of Australia's most beloved performers. It's an enthralling new doco that helps us try and understand 'The Voice' calling it "a must-see" for any Farnham fan".

Graeham Goble, who produced Farnham's Uncovered album and recommended that Farnham replace Glenn Shorrock as lead singer of Little River Band, took issue with Wheatley's description in the film that managing Little River Band was like managing a war. Wheatley had been the manager of both Farnham and Little River Band.

== Soundtrack ==
John Farnham: Finding the Voice: Music from the Feature Documentary

Soundtrack album by John Farnham and various artists
- Released: 19 May 2023
- Labels: Wheatley Records, Sony

John Farnham albums chronology
Friends for Christmas (2016)	John Farnham: Finding the Voice: Music from the Feature Documentary (2023)

A double-disc soundtrack was released on 19 May 2023. It features live tracks from Farnham's career, as well as music that had an impact on his career. Opening and closing compositions were written by music producer/director and former Farnham band keyboardist David Hirschfelder. The album debuted at number 2 on the ARIA Charts with 2520 sales.

=== Track listing ===
All songs performed by Farnham except where noted.

Disc 1
No.	Title	Writer(s)	Length
1.	"Lay Down Misère" (by David Hirschfelder)
2.	"Age of Reason" (Live In Melbourne)	Todd Hunter; Johanna Pigott
3.	"In My Room"	Farnham
4.	"Don't You Know It's Magic"	Brian Cadd
5.	"You're the Voice" (Live in Germany)	Chris Thompson; Maggie Ryder; Andy Qunta; Keith Reid
6.	"A Touch of Paradise" (Live in Melbourne)	Ross Wilson; Gulliver Smith; Roger McLachlan
7.	"Playing to Win" (Live in Melbourne)	Farnham; Graeham Goble; Hirschfelder; Stephen Housden; Spencer Proffer; Wayne Nelson; Steve Prestwich
8.	"Burn for You" (Live in Melbourne)	Farnham; Ross Fraser; Phil Buckle
9.	"When Something Is Wrong With My Baby" (with Jimmy Barnes)	Isaac Hayes; David Porter
10.	"One"	Harry Nilsson
11.	"When the War Is Over" (Live in Germany)	Steve Prestwich
12.	"Help" (Live in Melbourne)	Lennon–McCartney

Disc 2
No.	Title	Writer(s)	Length
1.	"Amazing Grace" (Live in Melbourne)	John Newton
2.	"Sadie the Cleaning Lady" (Live In Melbourne)	Ray Gilmore; Johnny Madara; David White
3.	"Help Is on Its Way" (by Little River Band)	Glenn Shorrock
4.	"Pressure Down"	Harry Bogdanovs
5.	"Please Don't Ask Me"	Goble
6.	"Raindrops Keep Falling On My Head"	Burt Bacharach; Hal David
7.	"As the Days Go By" (by Daryl Braithwaite)	Ian Thomas
8.	"Because I Love You" (by Masters Apprentices)	Doug Ford; Jim Keays
9.	"Going Going Gone"	Farnham; Hirschfelder; Fraser
10.	"You're the Voice"	Thompson; Ryder; Qunta; Reid
11.	"Finding the Voice (End Credit Suite)" (by David Hirschfelder)

=== Charts ===
Weekly chart performance for John Farnham: Finding the Voice (Music from the Feature Documentary)
Chart (2023)	Peak position
Australian Albums (ARIA)	2

=== Year-end charts ===
2023 year-end chart performance for John Farnham: Finding the Voice (Music from the Feature Documentary)
Chart (2023)	Position
Australian Artist Albums (ARIA)	12
