= Looking Through a Tear =

Looking Through A Tear

Studio album by Johnny Farnham
- Released: July 1970
- Recorded: December 1969–April 1970
- Genre: Pop
- Labels: EMI, Columbia
- Producers: Howard Gable; Arrangements: Johnny Hawker

Johnny Farnham chronology
Everybody Oughta Sing a Song (1968)	Looking Through A Tear (1970)	Christmas Is... Johnny Farnham (1970)

Singles from Looking Through A Tear
- 1. "One" Released: July 1969; 2. "Raindrops Keep Fallin' on My Head" Released: November 1969

Looking Through A Tear is the third studio album by Australian pop singer Johnny Farnham, the title of which relates to a song on the album, which is a cover of an Aretha Franklin number. it was released in Australia by EMI Records in July 1970. Farnham's covers of Harry Nilsson's penned "One" which became a hit for Three Dog Night and a cover B. J. Thomas' single "Raindrops Keep Fallin' on My Head" were released as singles, and helped to propel the album to No. 11 on the Australian Kent Music Report Album Charts. "One"/"Mr. Whippy" (non-album track) was released as a double A-side in July 1969 and peaked at No. 4 on the Go-Set National Singles Charts. "Raindrops Keep Fallin' On My Head" was released in November and peaked at No. 1 for seven weeks in January–March 1970. Farnham wrote two songs for the album.

== Background ==
Farnham's first solo single was the novelty song entitled "Sadie (The Cleaning Lady)", which was released in November 1967, it made No. 1 on the Go-Set National Singles Charts in January 1968 and remained there for five weeks. Selling 180 000 copies in Australia, "Sadie (The Cleaning Lady)" was the highest selling single by an Australian artist of the decade. Farnham's first album, Sadie, produced by David Mackay was released in April. Almost immediately, Farnham was recording his second album, Everybody Oughta Sing a Song released in November. This was followed by a non-album single, "I Saw Mommy Kissing Santa Claus", in November 1968. In July 1969, Farnham released a cover of Harry Nilsson's "One" with another novelty song, "Mr. Whippy", as a double A-side single, Produced by Howard Gable which peaked at No. 4 on the Go-Set National Singles Charts. Farnham then released a cover of B. J. Thomas' "Raindrops Keep Fallin' on My Head" also produced by Howard Gable, in November, which peaked at No. 1 for seven weeks in January–March 1970. Both of these singles were contained on his third album, Looking Through A Tear released in July 1970, which peaked at No. 11 on the Kent Music Report Albums Charts.

== Track listing ==
Side A

1. "One" (Harry Nilsson) – 2:49
2. "I've Been Rained On" (Dallas Frazier) – 2:22
3. "Mirror of My Mind" (Flynn (Mick Flynn) Douglas (pseudonym, used by Buddy England) – 2:15
4. "The World Goes Round and Round" (Michael Kunze, Ralph Siegel) – 3:55
5. "All Night Girl" (Peter Lee Stirling, John Barry Mason, Sylvan Whittingham) – 2:06
6. "You're Breaking Me Up" (Roy Wood) – 2:28
7. "Two" (John Farnham) – 4:42

Side B

1. "Raindrops Keep Fallin' on My Head" (Hal David, Burt Bacharach) – 2:29
2. "Looking Through A Tear" (Bobby Scott, Arthur Resnick) – 3:40
3. "Visions of Sugarplums" Jerry Fuller, Glen Campbell) – 2:12
4. "What Can I Do" (John Farnham) – 2:43
5. "In a Moment of Madness" (Ralph Freed, Jimmy McHugh) – 2:48
6. "Ain't Society Great" (Bobby Russell) – 2:34
7. "1432 Franklin Pike Circle Hero" (Bobby Russell) – 3:58

== Chart positions ==
Year	Chart	Peak Position
1970	Kent Music Report Albums Chart	11
1970	Go-Set Albums Chart	9
