= Johnny Farnham's Greatest Hits =

Compilation album by Johnny Farnham
- Released: July 1976
- Recorded: 1967–1974
- Genre: Pop
- Label: EMI Music

Johnny Farnham chronology
J.P. Farnham Sings (1975)	Johnny Farnham's Greatest Hits (1976)	Uncovered (1980)

Johnny Farnham's Greatest Hits is a compilation album by Australian pop singer John Farnham (known then as Johnny Farnham). The album was released in July 1976. It was Farnham's last album for EMI.

== Track listing ==
Side A

1. "Sadie (The Cleaning Lady)" (White, Madara, Gilmore)
2. "Friday Kind of Monday" (Greenwich, Barry)
3. "Underneath the Arches" (Bud Flanagan)
4. "I Don't Want to Love You" (Don Everly, Phil Everly)
5. "Jamie" (Hans Poulsen)
6. "Rose Coloured Glasses" (Poulsen)

Side B

1. "One" (Harry Nilsson)
2. "Raindrops Keep Falling on My Head" (Burt Bacharach-Hal David)
3. "Comic Conversation" (Bromley)
4. "Rock Me Baby" (Cymbal-Clinger)
5. "Don't You Know It's Magic" (Brian Cadd)
6. "Everything Is Out of Season" (Cook-Greenaway)
7. "I Can't Dance to Your Music" (Barry, Williams)
8. "Corner of the Sky" (Stephen Schwartz)
