= Anthology 1: Greatest Hits 1986–1997 =

Greatest hits album by John Farnham
- Released: 29 September 1997 (Australia)
- Recorded: 1986–1996
- Genres: Synthpop, pop, rock
- Length: 1:13:20
- Labels: Sony BMG, RCA, Gotham
- Producer: Ross Fraser

John Farnham chronology
Romeo's Heart (1996)	Anthology 1: Greatest Hits 1986–1997 (1997)	Anthology 2: Classic Hits 1967-1985 (Recorded Live) (1997)

Singles from Anthology 1: Greatest Hits 1986-1997
- 1. "Everytime You Cry"

Greatest Hits Edition Cover
- European edition titled "Greatest Hits"

2009 Reissue Cover
- 2009 reissue titled Greatest Hits

Anthology 1: Greatest Hits 1986–1997 (simply known as Greatest Hits outside of Australia and New Zealand) is a greatest hits compilation album by Australian singer John Farnham. The album was released in Australia on 29 September 1997, and is the first of a three disc Anthology set, coinciding with Farnham celebrating his 30th Anniversary in music.

This album reached No. 1 in the ARIA charts in October, and yielded a No. 3 hit single with the Human Nature and John Farnham collaboration, "Every Time You Cry".

In 2009, the album was reissued with the title Greatest Hits. The album was certified 5× platinum in Australia in 2020.

== Track listing ==
1. "You're the Voice" (M. Ryder, C. Thompson, A. Qunta, K. Reid) – 5:02
2. "Pressure Down" (H. Bogdanovs) – 3:45
3. "A Touch of Paradise" (R. Wilson, G. Smith) – 4:44
4. "Reasons" (S. See) – 4:26
5. "Two Strong Hearts" (B. Woolley, A. Hill) – 3:31
6. "Age of Reason" (T. Hunter, J. Pigott) – 5:06
7. "That's Freedom" (Tom Kimmel, J. Chapman) – 4:17
8. "Chain Reaction" (David A Stewart, S. Stewart) – 3:12
9. "Burn for You" (Phil Buckle, J. Farnham, R. Faser) – 3:32
10. "Seemed Like A Good Idea (At The Time)" (edit) (R. Wilson, J. Farnham, R. Fraser) – 3:46
11. "Talk of the Town" (S. Howard) – 3:41
12. "Angels" (T. Kimmel, J. Kimball) – 5:44
13. "Have a Little Faith (In Us)" (edit) (R. Desalvo, A. Roman) – 4:46
14. "A Simple Life" (J. Lind, R. Page) – 3:58
15. "Heart's on Fire" (edit) (T. Kimmel, S. Lynch) – 4:16
16. "When Something Is Wrong with My Baby" (with Jimmy Barnes) (J. Hayes, D. Porter) – 4:56
17. "Everytime You Cry" (with Human Nature) (S. Peiken, G. Sutton) – 4:47

VHS Release

The accompanying video cassette tape release includes all songs from Anthology 1, although “Reasons” is represented by a live version recording as no official music video was ever produced. The tape also includes music videos of “Please Don’t Ask Me” and “All Kinds of People” as well as a bonus “The Making of Age of Reason” video.

== Charts ==
=== Weekly charts ===
Chart (1997–2020)	Peak position
Australian Albums (ARIA)	1
German Albums (Offizielle Top 100)	40
New Zealand Albums (RMNZ)	10

=== Year-end charts ===
Chart (1997)	Position
Australian Albums (ARIA)	13
Chart (1998)	Position
Australian Albums (ARIA)	73

== Certifications ==
Region	Certification	Certified units/sales
Australia (ARIA)	5× Platinum	350,000^{‡}
New Zealand (RMNZ)	Gold	7,500^{^}
^{^} Shipments figures based on certification alone.^{‡} Sales+streaming figures based on certification alone.

== See also ==
- List of number-one albums of 1997 (Australia)
