= Anthology 2: Classic Hits 1967–1985 (Recorded Live) =

Greatest hits album by John Farnham
- Released: 29 September 1997 (Australia)
- Recorded: 1986–1996
- Genres: Pop, rock
- Length: 55:34
- Labels: Sony BMG, RCA, Gotham
- Producer: Ross Fraser

John Farnham chronology
Anthology 1: Greatest Hits 1986–1997 (1997)	Anthology 2: Classic Hits 1967–1985 (Recorded Live) (1997)	Anthology 3: Rarities (1997)

Anthology 2: Classic Hits 1967–1985 (Recorded Live) is a compilation album by Australian singer John Farnham. The album was released in Australia on 29 September 1997, and is the second of a three disc anthology set. The album features live recorded versions of Farnham's older hits, rare soundtrack songs, as well as covers of Australian band Cold Chisel’s "When the War Is Over" and The Beatles’ “Help!” as well as "And I Love Her". Many of the live recordings presented in this collection also appear on Farnham's 1991 live album Full House.

== Performance ==
This album peaked at No. 12 in the ARIA charts.

== Track listing ==
1. "Sadie (The Cleaning Lady)" (Gilmore, Madara) – 1:22
2. "One" (H. Nilsson) – 2:57
3. "Looking Through a Tear" (B. Scott, A. Resnick) – 3:47
4. "Raindrops Keep Falling on My Head" (B. Bacharach, H. David) – 3:08
5. "Comic Conversation" (J. Bromley) – 3:52
6. "Don't You Know It's Magic" (B. Cadd) – 4:07
7. "Everything Is Out of Season" (Cook, Greenway) – 2:54
8. "Help!" (J. Lennon, P. McCartney) – 4:49
9. "Matilda" (G. Goble) – 4:17
10. "Infatuation" (M. Brady, G. Goble) – 2:43
11. "That's No Way to Love Someone" (J. Farnham, S. McNally, J. Nicholls, R. Leigh) – 2:51
12. "Please Don't Ask Me" (G. Goble) – 3:24
13. "Playing to Win" (G. Goble, J. Farnham, D. Hirschfelder, S. Housden, S. Proffer, W. Nelson, S. Prestwich) – 3:01
14. "Justice For One" (J. Farnham, S. Shifrin) – 3:28
15. "When the War is Over" (S. Prestwich) – 5:31
16. "And I Love Her" (J. Lennon, P. McCartney) – 3:30

== Charts ==
=== Weekly charts ===
Chart (1997)	Peak position
Australian Albums (ARIA)	12

=== Year-end charts ===
Chart (1997)	Position
Australian Albums (ARIA)	56

== Certifications ==
Region	Certification	Certified units/sales
Australia (ARIA)	Gold	35,000^{^}
^{^} Shipments figures based on certification alone.
