= 33 1/3 (album) =

- Cover to the standard edition of the album

Studio album by John Farnham
- Released: 4 August 2000
- Genres: Pop, rock, soul
- Length: 51:21
- Labels: Sony BMG, RCA, Gotham
- Producers: Ross Fraser, John Farnham

John Farnham chronology
Live at the Regent Theatre – 1st July 1999 (1999)	33 1/3 (2000)	Love Songs (2002)

Singles from 33 1/3
- 1. "Trying to Live My Life Without You" Released: July 2000; 2. "Man of the Hour" Released: October 2000; 3. "You're the Only One" Released: January 2001

33 1/3 is a studio album by Australian singer John Farnham. The album was released in Australia in August 2000, and is Farnham's first studio release since Romeo's Heart in 1996. This album debuted at No. 1 in the ARIA Charts.

On 27 November 2000, a DVD version of the album was released which contained bonus footage, including behind the scenes, band interviews, and a documentary on the making of the album.

== Track listing ==
No.	Title	Writer(s)	Length
1.	"That Driving Beat"	Willie Mitchell	2:26
2.	"Trying to Live My Life Without You"	Eugene Williams	3:27
3.	"You Don't Know Like I Know"	Isaac Hayes, David Porter	2:47
4.	"Everything Is Gonna Be All Right"	Willie Mitchell	3:15
5.	"Man of the Hour"	Sean Hostin, Dane Deviller, Steve Kipner	4:10
6.	"I've Been Lonely for So Long"	Posie Knight, Jerry Weaver	4:42
7.	"That's What Love Will Make You Do"	Milton Campbell	4:10
8.	"I Can't Get Next to You"	Norman Whitfield, Barrett Strong	5:02
9.	"You're the Only One"	Merril Bainbridge	4:20
10.	"I Thank You"	I. Hayes, D. Porter	3:50
11.	"Soul Reason"	Jeff Pescetto, Steve Diamond	4:14
12.	"The Way"	Geoff Wells	4:44
13.	"Walk Away"	Oliver Sain	4:20

== DVD track listing ==
No.	Title	Writer(s)	Length
1.	"Intro"		0:09
2.	"Trying to Live My Life Without You"	E. Williams	3:42
3.	"That Driving Beat"	W. Mitchell	2:52
4.	"Man of the Hour"	S. Hostin, D. Deviller, S. Kipner	4:21
5.	"That's What Love Will Make You Do"	M. Campbell	4:43
6.	"You Don't Know Like I Know"	Isaac Hayes, David Porter	3:04
7.	"You're the Only One"	M. Bainbridge	4:26
8.	"Everything Is Gonna Be Alright"	W. Mitchell	3:17
9.	"I Can't Get Next to You"	Norman Whitfield, Barrett Strong	5:19
10.	"The Way"	G. Wells	5:02
11.	"I Thank You"	I. Hayes, D. Porter	3:59
12.	"Soul Reason"	J. Pescetto, S. Diamond	4:37
13.	"Credits"		1:18
14.	"Everytime You Cry" (Bonus Track)	Gregg Sutton, Shelly Peiken	4:47
15.	"On the Inside" (Bonus Track)		24:19
16.	"Band Interviews" (Bonus Track)		9:53

== Personnel ==
Musicians:

- John Farnham – vocals
- Lisa Edwards – vocals
- Lindsay Field – vocals
- Stuart Fraser – guitars
- Chong Lim – keyboards, additional brass arrangements
- Joe Creighton – bass, vocals
- Angus Burchall – drums
- Steve Williams – tenor sax, baritone sax, brass arrangements
- Bob Coassin – trumpet, flugelhorn
- Lex Tier – trombone

Technical:

- Michael Costa – mastering

== Charts ==
=== Weekly charts ===
Chart (2000/01)	Peak position
Australian Albums (ARIA)	1

=== Year-end charts ===
Chart (2000)	Position
Australian Albums (ARIA)	12

== Certifications ==
Region	Certification	Certified units/sales
Australia (ARIA)	3× Platinum	210,000^{^}
^{^} Shipments figures based on certification alone.

== Release history ==
Region	Date
Australia	7 July 2000
Netherlands	3 October 2000
Germany	9 October 2000

== See also ==
- List of number-one albums of 2000 (Australia)
