= Love Songs (John Farnham album) =

Compilation album by John Farnham
- Released: July 2002 (Germany)
- Genres: Pop, rock
- Length: 67:59
- Label: RCA Records
- Producer: Ross Fraser

John Farnham chronology
33⅓ (2000)	Love Songs (2002)	The Last Time (2002)

Love Songs is a compilation album by Australian singer John Farnham. It was released in Germany in July 2002.

== Track listing ==
CD

1. "Love to Shine" (Harry Bogdanovs) - 4:02
2. "You're the Voice" (Andy Qunta, Keith Reid, Maggie Ryder, Chris Thompson) - 5:05
3. "A Touch of Paradise" (Ross Wilson, Gulliver Smith) - 4:47
4. "Please Don't Ask Me" (Graham Goble) - 3:19
5. "She Says to Me" (Graham Globe) - 3:49
6. "Jillie's Song" (John Farnham, Graham Goble) - 3:59
7. "On My Own" (Graham Goble) - 5:12
8. "Help!" (John Lennon, Paul McCartney) - 4:24
9. "Listen to the Wind" (Jonathan Stevens / Brent Thomas) - 4:22
10. "We're No Angels" (Ross Wilson) - 4:50
11. "In Days to Come" (John Farnham, Ross Fraser, David Hirschfelder) - 4:05
12. "Burn for You" (Phil Buckle, Ross Fraser) - 3:33
13. "I Can Do Anything" (Phil Buckle, John Farnham) - 4:26
14. "Treated This Way" (Phil Buckle, John Farnham, Ross Fraser, Richard Marx) - 4:08
15. "The Reason Why" (Phil Buckle, Richard Marx) - 3:40
16. "Romeo's Heart" (J.D. Kimball) - 4:18
