= The Last Time (album) =

Studio album by John Farnham
- Released: 7 October 2002 (Australia)
- Recorded: March–July 2002
- Genres: Pop; rock
- Length: 38:38
- Labels: Sony BMG, RCA, Gotham
- Producers: Ross Fraser, John Farnham

John Farnham chronology
Love Songs (2002)	The Last Time (2002)	An Audience with John Farnham (2002)

Singles from The Last Time
- 1. "Keep Talking" Released: January 2003

"The Last Time" DVD cover
- "The Last Time" DVD released on 21 July 2003

The Last Time is a studio album by Australian singer John Farnham. The album was released in Australia on 7 October 2002 and reached No. 1 in the ARIA charts with triple platinum status. The album featured one single "Keep Talking" and two promotional singles

== Track listing ==
1. "The Last Time" (Mick Jagger, Keith Richards) – 3:31
2. "No Ordinary World" (Lars Anderson, Stephen Allen Davis) – 3:50
3. "Lonely Man" (Simon Ellis, Wayne Hector) – 4:48
4. "When I Can't Have You" (Winston Sela) – 4:15
5. "Undeniably Real" (Keith Beauvais, Shaun Escoffery, Keith Murrell) – 3:30
6. "Keep Talking" (David Munday, Phil Thornalley) – 3:14
7. "Sometimes" (Steve Romig) – 4:09
8. "One More Try" (Andrew Gibbs) – 3:34
9. "Even After All This Time" (Andrew Gibbs) – 4:07
10. "Eternally" (James Roche, Melinda Schneider) – 3:44

== Personnel ==
Musicians

- John Farnham – vocals
- Chong Lim – keyboards, arrangements
- Angus Burchall – drums
- Craig Newman – bass
- Stuart Fraser – guitars
- Lindsay Field – vocals
- Lisa Edwards – vocals
- The Victorian Philharmonic Orchestra – strings

Technical staff

- Michael Costa – mastering

== Charts ==
=== Weekly charts ===
Chart (2002/03)	Peak position
Australian Albums (ARIA)	1

=== Year-end charts ===
Chart (2002)	Position
Australian Albums (ARIA)	10
Chart (2003)	Position
Australian Albums (ARIA)	16

== Certifications ==
Region	Certification	Certified units/sales
Australia (ARIA)	3× Platinum	210,000^{^}
^{^} Shipments figures based on certification alone.

== DVD ==
On 21 July 2003, a DVD, also titled The Last Time, was released featuring live footage of Farnham's concert tour The Last Time Live. The DVD featured tracks from The Last Time album along with other hits and well known songs from his previous ARIA award-winning albums Whispering Jack, Age of Reason, Chain Reaction and Romeo's Heart.

=== The Last Time, DVD track listing ===
Part 1: Acoustic

1. "A Simple Life [Live]" (J. Lind, R. Page) – 4:28
2. "Raindrops Keep Falling on My Head [Live]" (B. Bacharach, H. David) – 8:01
3. "A Touch Of Paradise [Live]" (R. Wilson, G. Smith) – 7:44
4. "Burn For You [Live]" (P. Buckle, J. Farnham, R. Faser) – 9:09
5. "Talk of the Town [Live]" (S. Howard) – 4:07
6. "Two Strong Hearts [Live]" (B. Woolley, A. Hill) – 3:21
7. "Chain Reaction [Live]" (D. Stewart, S. Stewart) – 3:47

Part 2: Electric

1. "Reasons [Live]" (S. See) – 5:17
2. "No Ordinary World [Live]" (L. Andersson, S. Davis) – 4:02
3. "Hearts On Fire [Live]" (T. Kimmel, S. Lynch) – 7:53
4. "When The War Is Over [Live]" (S. Prestwich) – 5:24
5. "Age Of Reason [Live]" (T. Hunter, J. Pigott) – 10:34
6. "Keep Talking [Live]" (P. Thornalley, D. Munday) – 3:16
7. "Man of the Hour [Live]" (S. Hostin, D. Deviller, S. Kipner) – 5:09
8. "One [Live]" (H. Nilsson) – 3:47
9. "Everytime You Cry [Live]" (S. Peiken, G. Sutton) – 6:13
10. "Please Don't Ask Me [Live]" (G. Goble) – 6:35
11. "Help! [Live]" (J. Lennon, P. McCartney) – 7:46
12. "That's Freedom [Live]" (T. Kimmel, J. Chapman) – 4:53
13. "Pressure Down [Live]" (H. Bogdanovs) – 3:35
14. "Playing to Win [Live]" (G. Goble, J. Farnham, D. Hirschfelder, S. Housden, S. Proffer, W. Nelson, S. Prestwich) – 3:07
15. "You're the Voice [Live]" (M. Ryder, C. Thompson, A. Qunta, K. Reid) – 8:10
16. "Sadie (The Cleaning Lady) [Live]" (Gilmore, Madara) – 2:15
17. "The Last Time [Live]" (M. Jagger, K. Richards) – 6:57

Part 3

1. "Credits" – 3:14

Part 4

1. "Under The Big Top" – 27:21
