= An Audience with John Farnham =

Video by John Farnham
- Released: 9 December 2002 (Australia)
- Recorded: 23 October 2002
- Genres: Pop; rock
- Length: 1:12:58
- Labels: Sony BMG, RCA, Gotham
- Director: Simon Francis
- Producers: Grant Rule, Melissa Byrne

John Farnham chronology
The Last Time (2002)	An Audience with John Farnham (2002)	One Voice: The Greatest Hits (2003)

An Audience with John Farnham is a DVD release by Australian singer John Farnham. The DVD was released in Australia on 9 December 2002.

Originally this program aired on Australia's Channel Seven Network on 23 October 2002, and was filmed at Channel Seven Studios in Melbourne, Australia.

== DVD track listing ==
1. "Introduction" – 0:29
2. "Chain Reaction" (D. Stewart, S. Stewart) – 3:16
3. "Q&A: Part 1" – 7:13
4. "No Ordinary World" (L. Andersson, S. Davis) – 3:57
5. "Q&A: Part 2" – 1:53
6. "Pressure Down" (H. Bogdanovs) – 4:05
7. "Q&A: Part 3" – 15:05
8. "Keep Talking" (P. Thornalley, D. Munday) – 3:27
9. "Q&A: Part 4" – 4:32
10. "That's Freedom" (T. Kimmel, J. Chapman) – 4:41
11. "Q&A: Part 5" – 1:48
12. "When I Can't Have You" (S. Waermo, W. Sela) – 4:48
13. "Q&A: Part 6" – 5:09
14. "The Last Time" (M. Jagger, K. Richards) – 5:37
15. "Behind The Scenes [Bonus Track]" – 3:42
16. "Bonus Q&A [Bonus Track]" – 3:22

== Charts ==
Chart (2003)	Peak position
Australia DVD (ARIA)	9

== Certifications ==
Region	Certification	Certified units/sales
Australia (ARIA)	Gold	7,500^{^}
^{^} Shipments figures based on certification alone.
