= Christmas Is Johnny Farnham =

Christmas Is... Johnny Farnham

Studio album by Johnny Farnham
- Released: December 1970
- Recorded: December 1970
- Genres: Pop; Christmas
- Labels: EMI, Columbia
- Producer: David Mackay

Johnny Farnham chronology
Looking Through a Tear (1970)	Christmas Is... Johnny Farnham (1970)	Johnny (1971)

Singles from Christmas Is... Johnny Farnham
- 1. "Christmas Happy" Released: December 1970

1995 Re-release
- Memories of Christmas

1997 Re-release
- Memories of Christmas with variant cover.

Christmas Is... Johnny Farnham (later re-released twice as Memories of Christmas by Johnny Farnham, with different cover art, at the time of the album's release, he was now recording under John Farnham) is a studio album of Christmas songs recorded by Australian pop singer John Farnham (then billed as Johnny Farnham) and released on EMI Records in December 1970. The single, "Christmas Happy", was also released in December. It would be Farnham's only Christmas album until 2016, when he would release Friends for Christmas, a duet seasonal album with Olivia Newton-John.

== Re-releases ==
The album was re-released under the new title of Memories of Christmas, on 13 November 1995 and again on 6 December 1997 with different covers and an altered track list each time.

== Background ==
Johnny Farnham's first No. 1 single on the Go-Set National Singles Charts was the novelty song "Sadie (The Cleaning Lady)" released in 1967. Selling 180 000 copies in Australia, "Sadie (The Cleaning Lady)" was the highest selling single by an Australian artist of the decade. His first Christmas song was a non-album single, "I Saw Mommy Kissing Santa Claus", in November 1968. A cover of B. J. Thomas' "Raindrops Keep Fallin' on My Head" was released in November 1969 and peaked at No. 1 for seven weeks in January–March 1970. After his third album, Looking Through a Tear was released in July 1970, a non-album single, "Comic Conversation" was released in October and peaked at No. 10 on the Go-Set National Top 60 Singles Chart. Farnham recorded his fourth album as Christmas Is... Johnny Farnham, it was released in December and contained Christmas songs but did not chart on the Go-Set National Top 20 Albums Chart. One of the songs, "Good Time Christmas", was written by Farnham. The single, "Christmas Happy", was also released in December.

== Track listing ==
Side A

1. "Santa Claus Is Coming to Town" (J. Fred Coots, Haven Gillespie) – 3:14
2. "Christmas Is" (Percy Faith, Spence Maxwell) – 2:58
3. "The Ringing Reindeer" (Gunnar Skoglund) – 3:10
4. "Little Drummer Boy" (Katherine Kennicott Davis, Henry Onorati, Harry Simeone) – 3:42
5. "Jingle Bells" (James Pierpont) – 2:49
6. "Good Time Christmas" (John Farnham) – 2:28
7. "Everything Is Beautiful" (Ray Stevens) – 3:50

Side B

1. "White Christmas" (Irving Berlin) – 3:55
2. "The First Noel" (Traditional; arranged by Davies Gilbert) – 3:08
3. "Silent Night" (Josef Mohr, Franz Gruber, translated by John Freeman Young) – 2:50
4. "There's No Place Like Home" (Henry Bishop, John Howard Payne) – 3:11
5. "Little Boy Dear" (François Vaz) – 3:38
6. "It Must Be Getting Close to Christmas" (Sammy Cahn, Jimmy Van Heusen) – 3:21
7. "Christmas Happy" (Tommy Leonetti, A. Kitson) – 2:28
