= The Acoustic Chapel Sessions =

Live album by John Farnham
- Released: 30 September 2011 (Australia)
- Recorded: July 2011 at Chapel off Chapel
- Genres: Pop, rock
- Label: Sony BMG
- Producer: Ross Fraser

John Farnham chronology
Jack (2010)	The Acoustic Chapel Sessions (2011)	Two Strong Hearts Live (2015)

The Acoustic Chapel Sessions is an album by Australian singer, John Farnham. It was released through Sony BMG, as a CD + DVD package in September 2011 and the album peaked at number 10 on the ARIA Charts.

The CD, recorded at Chapel off Chapel in July of that year, consists of eleven of Farnham's greatest hits reworked as stripped-back acoustic compositions. The DVD package includes eight of the songs ('Two Strong Hearts' being an alternate take) as well as interviews with John and the band, in addition to behind-the-scenes footage.

== Background ==
The release of The Acoustic Chapel Sessions coincides with the 25th anniversary of Whispering Jack, Australia's highest-selling and most successful album ever.

John Farnham explained, "We wanted to rework some of the songs that we have been doing on stage for the last 25 years. It's always difficult to rework something that people are very used to, having said that we have had a lot of fun doing it'. Farnham's manager, Glenn Wheatley, added, "This recording has just given me goose bumps; it's amazing seeing the songs stripped right back and all acoustic. I wonder why we didn't think about doing this earlier".

== Tour and promotion ==
Farnham toured the album nationally in October and November 2011 in intimate venues with smaller audiences than his large stadium shows. Patrick McDonald of Adelaide Now said of the tour, "Magic was the right word. For all the flack he cops about endless comebacks, it would truly be a crime if 'The Voice' was ever silenced."

A music video of "Pressure Down" taken from the DVD was released to further promote the album.

== Review ==
Jon O'Brien of AllMusic gave the album 3 out of 5. He said that the majority of the album adheres to the "if it ain't broke.." approach but complimented the conviction on "Pressure Down" which abandons its synth-heavy AOR sound in favor of a subtle and soulful gospel vibe, and "Two Strong Hearts", which transforms the impassioned MOR staple into a seductive slice of lounge-pop. O'Brien did comment that the acoustic setting meant some of his bigger/bolder tracks lost their anthemic appeal, in particular "Age of Reason" and "You're the Voice" which removes the bagpipe solo that made it so memorable.

== Track listing ==
CD

1. Pressure Down - 4:11
2. Reasons - 3:55
3. Chain Reaction - 3:09
4. Playing to Win - 3:01
5. You're the Voice - 4:00
6. That's Freedom - 4:18
7. Two Strong Hearts - 3:27
8. Age of Reason - 4:59
9. Talk of the Town - 3:51
10. A Simple Life - 4:04
11. Heart's on Fire - 4:47

DVD

1. Talk of the Town
2. Chain Reaction
3. Two Strong Hearts
4. Pressure Down
5. Hearts on Fire
6. A Simple Life
7. Age of Reason
8. Playing to Win

== Charts ==
The Acoustic Chapel Sessions debuted and peaked on the week commencing 10 October 2011.

=== Weekly charts ===
Chart (2011)	Peak position
Australian Albums (ARIA)	10

== Credits ==
- Lead Vocals – John Farnham
- Backing and Harmony Vocals – Lindsay Field, Lisa Edwards, Rod Davies, Susie Ahern
- Keys – Chong Lim
- Guitar and Banjo – Brett Garsed
- Guitar – Stuart Fraser
- Bass – Craig Newman
- Drums – Angus Burchall
- Saxophone and Harmonica – Steve Williams
- Mix and Engineering – Doug Brady
- Producer – Ross Fraser
