= Johnny Farnham Sings Hits from the Movies =

Studio album by Johnny Farnham
- Released: 6 September 1974
- Recorded: February–June 1974
- Genre: Pop
- Label: His Master's Voice
- Producer: Peter Dawkins

Johnny Farnham chronology
Johnny Farnham Sings The Big Hits Of '73 Live! (1973)	Johnny Farnham Sings Hits from the Movies (1974)	J.P. Farnham Sings (1975)

Johnny Farnham Sings Hits from the Movies is the 9th studio album by British-born Australian pop singer John Farnham (known then as Johnny Farnham). The album was released in September 1974.

== Track listing ==
Side A

1. "Cabaret" (from Cabaret)
2. "Speak Softly Love" (from The Godfather)
3. "Everybody's Talkin''" (from Midnight Cowboy)
4. "The Summer Knows"
5. "Carnival"
6. "Hi-Lili, Hi-Lo" (from Lili)

Side B

1. "Raindrops Keep Fallin' on My Head" (from Butch Cassidy and the Sundance Kid)
2. "The Rain in Spain" (from My Fair Lady)
3. "Singin' in the Rain" (from Singin' in the Rain)
4. "(Where Do I Begin?) Love Story" (from Love Story)
5. "Where's The Birdie?"
6. "The First Time Ever I Saw Your Face" (from Play Misty for Me)
7. "Mrs Robinson" (from The Graduate)
