= Uncovered (John Farnham album) =

Studio album by John Farnham
- Released: 3 July 1980 (Australia)
- Recorded: 1979–1980
- Genres: Pop; rock
- Length: 40:10
- Labels: Sony BMG, Wheatley
- Producer: Graeham Goble

John Farnham chronology
Johnny Farnham's Greatest Hits (1976)	Uncovered (1980)	The Best of John Farnham (1980)

Singles from Uncovered
- 1. "Help!" Released: June 1980; 2. "She's Everywhere" Released: September 1980; 3. "Please Don't Ask Me" Released: January 1981

Uncovered is the eleventh solo studio album by British-born Australian singer John Farnham, produced by Little River Band's Graeham Goble, and released on 3 July 1980, which peaked at No. 20 on the Australian Kent Music Report album chart and was certified gold in 1981.

Farnham's first single from the album was a reworking of the Beatles' song "Help!"; it peaked at No. 8 on the Kent Music Report singles chart. The third single "Please Don't Ask Me" peaked at No. 67.

== Background ==
John Farnham had been a teen pop idol during the late 1960s and 1970s, when he met Glenn Wheatley, who was bass guitarist of rock group the Masters Apprentices, when both acts were managed by Darryl Sambell. From the mid-1970s, Farnham had moved into television, stage and cabaret entertainment. Wheatley, who was already managing Little River Band (LRB), signed Farnham to his company in 1980. They decided Farnham's comeback single would be a reworking of the Beatles' "Help!", which was produced by LRB's Graeham Goble. It peaked at No. 8 on the Australian Kent Music Report singles chart. Farnham was utilising a more adult contemporary pop style and the associated album, Uncovered, also produced by Goble, peaked at No. 20 on the Kent Music Report album chart. The B-side of "Help" was Farnham's songwriting debut "Jillie's Song", co-written with Goble. For the recording of the album, Farnham's studio band included guitarist Tommy Emmanuel (ex-Southern Star Band), keyboardist Mal Logan (ex-Renée Geyer Band, LRB), drummer Derek Pellicci (LRB) and bass guitarist Barry Sullivan (ex-Chain). They became his tour band until Logan and Pellicci returned to their LRB commitments and were replaced by Sam McNally and David Jones respectively. Three other solo singles followed in 1981 but none charted into the top 50. In February 1982, after Glenn Shorrock had departed Little River Band, Farnham became their lead vocalist with recommendations by Goble and Wheatley. Farnham remained with Little River Band until late 1986.

== Track listing ==
1. "Matilda" (Graeham Goble) – 4:19
2. "She Says to Me" (Goble) – 3:48
3. "Jillie's Song" (John Farnham, Goble) – 3:59
4. "Infatuation" (Mike Brady, Goble) – 2:56
5. "On My Own" (Goble) – 5:13
6. "Back to the Backwoods" (Goble) – 5:13
7. "I Never Did Get Through" (Goble) – 2:45
8. "Please Don't Ask Me" (Goble) – 3:19
9. "She's Everywhere" (Goble, Mal Logan) – 4:20
10. "Help!" (John Lennon, Paul McCartney) – 4:25

== Personnel ==
- David Briggs – guitar
- Peter Cupples – backing vocals
- Tommy Emmanuel – guitar
- John Farnham – lead vocals
- Ric Formosa – string arrangements
- Doug Gallacher – conga
- Graeham Goble – vocals
- Bill Harrower – saxophone
- Peter Jones – piano, electric piano
- Mal Logan – synthesizer, electric piano, clavinet, hammond synthesiser
- Graeme Lyall – saxophone
- Julie McKenna – vocals
- Wayne Nelson – vocals
- Derek Pellicci – drums, percussion
- Barry Sullivan – bass guitar

== Charts ==
Chart (1980)	Peak position
Australia (Kent Music Report)	20

== Certifications and sales ==
Region	Certification	Certified units/sales
Australia (ARIA)	Gold	20,000^{^}
^{^} Shipments figures based on certification alone.
