= Anthology 3: Rarities =

Compilation album by John Farnham
- Released: 10 November 1997 (Australia)
- Recorded: 1966–1997
- Genres: Pop, Rock
- Length: 59:06
- Labels: Sony BMG, RCA, Gotham
- Producer: Ross Fraser

John Farnham chronology
| Anthology 2: Classic Hits 1967-1985 (Recorded Live) (1997) | Anthology 3: Rarities (1997) | Highlights from The Main Event (1998) |

Anthology 3: Rarities is a compilation album of mainly covers (including songs originally recorded by The Beatles, ZZ Top and Led Zeppelin), by Australian singer John Farnham. The album was released in Australia on 10 November 1997, and is the third of a three disc anthology set. The album features a live 'Swing Version' of "You're the Voice" performed with the Melbourne Symphony Orchestra at the grand opening of Crown Casino, as well as duets with Australian country vocalist Smoky Dawson and Taiwanese singer Chiu.

== Track listing ==
1. "I Feel Fine" (J. Lennon, P. McCartney) – 2:06
2. "Susan Jones" (P. Best) – 2:00
3. "Birthday" (J. Lennon, P. McCartney) – 2:50
4. "Legs" (F. Beard, J. Hill, B. Gibbons) – 4:38
5. "Black Dog" (J. Page, R. Plant, J. Jones) – 4:37
6. "Dream People" (F. Howson, J. Capek) – 5:05
7. "Good Company" (R. Fraser, P. Buckle, J. Farnham) – 4:23
8. "Take You Back" (S. Romig, F. Sablotny) – 4:06
9. "Love's in Need" (S. Wonder) – 4:04
10. "You're the Voice [Swing Version]" (A. Qunta, C. Thompson, K. Reid, M. Ryder) – 4:57
11. "Little Piece of My Heart" (C. Celli, A. Levin, J. Ponti) – 2:10
12. "Break The Ice" (S. Schifrin, B. Marlette) – 3:19
13. "Running For Love" (H. Faltermeyer, T. Whitlock) – 2:56
14. "Burn For You [U.S. Mix]" (P. Buckle, R. Fraser, J. Farnham) – 3:28
15. "Cool Water" – with Smoky Dawson (B. Nolan) – 3:54
16. "Don't Let It End" – with Chiu (A. Hendra) – 4:42

== Charts ==
=== Weekly charts ===
| Chart (1997) | Peak position |
|---|---|
| Australian Albums (ARIA) | 20 |

=== Year-end charts ===
| Chart (1997) | Position |
|---|---|
| Australian Albums (ARIA) | 87 |

== Certifications ==
| Region | Certification | Certified units/sales |
|---|---|---|
| Australia (ARIA) | Gold | 35,000^{^} |
^{^} Shipments figures based on certification alone.
