= With the Sydney Symphony Live at the Sydney Opera House =

With The Sydney Symphony Live at the Sydney Opera House

Video by John Farnham
- Released: 29 April 2006 (Australia)
- Recorded: 2006
- Genre: Pop, rock
- Length: 2:01:49
- Label: Sony BMG
- Producer: Ross Fraser

John Farnham chronology
Chain Reaction Live in Concert (2005)	With The Sydney Symphony Live at the Sydney Opera House (2006)	The Essential 3.0 (2009)

With The Sydney Symphony Live at the Sydney Opera House is a DVD release by Australian singer John Farnham. The DVD was released in Australia on 29 April 2006.

This DVD contains John Farnham's performance at the Sydney Opera House, Sydney in 2006 with the Sydney Symphony Orchestra. This program was originally aired on Australia's Channel Seven in 2006.

== DVD track listing ==
1. "Heading in the Right Direction" (M. Punch, G. Paige) – 4:37
2. "Come Back Again" (R. Wilson) – 5:30
3. "Downhearted" (B. McDonough, G. McDonough, S. Higgins) – 5:05
4. "Girls on the Avenue" (R. Clapton) – 4:59
5. "No Aphrodisiac" (T. Freedman, G. Dormand, M. Ford) – 6:25
6. "Man of the Hour" (S. Hostin, D. Deviller, S. Kipner) – 4:28
7. "Green Limousine" (M. Spiby) – 4:03
8. "Come Said the Boy" (E. McCusker) – 4:37
9. "Tryin' To Live My Life Without You" (E. Williams) – 3:43
10. "I Remember When I Was Young" (M. Taylor) – 4:49
11. "Reasons" (S. See) – 5:02
12. "One" (H. Nilsson) – 3:49
13. "Age of Reason" (T. Hunter, J. Pigott) – 7:01
14. "A Touch of Paradise" (R. Wilson, G. Smith) – 4:54
15. "Everytime You Cry" (S. Peiken, G. Sutton) – 4:21
16. "Pressure Down" (H. Bogdanovs) – 6:33
17. "Burn for You" (P. Buckle, J. Farnham, R. Faser) – 6:59
18. "Help!" (J. Lennon, P. McCartney) – 5:04
19. "That's Freedom" (T. Kimmel, J. Chapman) – 4:27
20. "Playing to Win" (G. Goble, J. Farnham, D. Hirschfelder, S. Housden, S. Proffer, W. Nelson, S. Prestwich) – 4:06
21. "We Will Rock You" (B. May) – 3:23
22. "You're the Voice" (M. Ryder, C. Thompson, A. Qunta, K. Reid) – 5:43
23. "I Remember When I Was Young: A Chat With Jack" [Bonus Track] – 12:20

== Charts ==
=== Weekly charts ===
Chart (2006–2007)	Peak position
Australia DVD (ARIA)	1

=== Year-end charts ===
Chart (2006)	Rank
Australia DVD (ARIA)	34

== Certifications ==
Region	Certification	Certified units/sales
Australia (ARIA)	2× Platinum	30,000^{^}
^{^} Shipments figures based on certification alone.
