= Highlights from The Main Event =

Highlights from the Main Event

Live album by Olivia Newton-John, John Farnham, Anthony Warlow
- Released: December 1998
- Genres: Pop; rock
- Label: BMG Ariola

John Farnham chronology
Anthology 3: Rarities (1997)	Highlights from the Main Event (1998)	Live at the Regent Theatre – 1st July 1999 (1999)

Alternative cover

Olivia Newton-John chronology
Back with a Heart (1998)	Highlight from the Main Event (1999)	One Woman's Live Journey (2000)

Highlights from The Main Event is an Australian live album released in 1998, which consists of performances from the collaborative The Main Event Tour by John Farnham, Olivia Newton-John, and Anthony Warlow. The album peaked at No. 1 on the ARIA Albums Chart for two weeks in December that year. It was re-released in 2001 with three additional tracks.

== Track listing ==
=== Main album ===
1. "Overture" feat. Olivia Newton-John, John Farnham, Anthony Warlow
2. "Age of Reason (Part 1)" feat. Olivia Newton-John, John Farnham, Anthony Warlow
3. "The Phantom of the Opera" feat. Olivia Newton-John, John Farnham, Anthony Warlow
4. "Little More Love" feat. Olivia Newton-John, John Farnham, Anthony Warlow
5. "Age of Reason (Part 2)" feat. Olivia Newton-John, John Farnham, Anthony Warlow
6. "This Is the Moment" feat Anthony Warlow
7. "Hopelessly Devoted to You" feat. Olivia Newton-John
8. "Every Time You Cry" feat. John Farnham
9. "Please Don't Ask Me" feat. Olivia Newton-John, John Farnham
10. "You're the One That I Want" feat. Olivia Newton-John, John Farnham
11. "Long and Winding Road" feat. Olivia Newton-John, Anthony Warlow
12. "Take Me Home, Country Roads" feat. Olivia Newton-John, Anthony Warlow
13. "I Honestly Love You" feat. Olivia Newton-John, Anthony Warlow
14. "Love Is a Gift" feat. Olivia Newton-John, Anthony Warlow
15. "That's Life/Bad Habits" feat. John Farnham, Anthony Warlow
16. "Granada" feat. John Farnham, Anthony Warlow
17. "You've Lost That Lovin' Feelin'" feat. Olivia Newton-John, John Farnham, Anthony Warlow
18. "Summer Nights" feat. Olivia Newton-John, John Farnham, Anthony Warlow
19. "If Not for You" feat. Olivia Newton-John, John Farnham, Anthony Warlow
20. "Let Me Be There" feat. Olivia Newton-John, John Farnham, Anthony Warlow
21. "Raindrops Keep Falling on My Head" feat. Olivia Newton-John, John Farnham, Anthony Warlow
22. "Jolene" feat. Olivia Newton-John, John Farnham, Anthony Warlow
23. "Heart's on Fire" feat. Olivia Newton-John, John Farnham, Anthony Warlow
24. "Don't You Know It's Magic" feat. Olivia Newton-John, John Farnham, Anthony Warlow
25. "You're the Voice" feat. Olivia Newton-John, John Farnham, Anthony Warlow

=== 2001 limited edition reissue bonus tracks ===
1. "Two Strong Hearts" feat. Olivia Newton-John, John Farnham
2. "Not Gonna Give in to It" feat. Olivia Newton-John, Anthony Warlow
3. "Help!" feat. John Farnham, Anthony Warlow

== Charts ==
=== Weekly charts ===
Chart (1998/99)	Peak position
Australian Albums (ARIA)	1

=== Year-end charts ===
Chart (1998)	Position
Australian Albums (ARIA)	4
Chart (1999)	Position
Australian Albums (ARIA)	24

== Certifications ==
Region	Certification	Certified units/sales
Australia (ARIA)	5× Platinum	350,000^{^}
^{^} Shipments figures based on certification alone.
