= Then Again (John Farnham album) =

1993 studio album by John Farnham

Then Again...

Studio album by John Farnham
- Released: 18 October 1993
- Length: 1:00:54
- Label: Sony BMG, RCA
- Producer: Ross Fraser, John Farnham

John Farnham chronology
Full House (1991)	Then Again... (1993)	Romeo's Heart (1996)

Singles from Then Again...
- 1. "Seemed Like a Good Idea (At the Time)" Released: 6 September 1993; 2. "Angels" Released: 15 November 1993; 3. "Talk of the Town" Released: 7 February 1994; 4. "The Reason Why" Released: 9 May 1994

Then Again... is a studio album by Australian singer John Farnham. The album was released in Australia on 18 October 1993, and reached No. 1 on the ARIA charts. It is notable along with its predecessor, Chain Reaction, for the fact that Farnham himself co-wrote most of the songs on the album, in this case nine of the fourteen tracks. The album won Highest Selling Album at the ARIA Music Awards of 1994, and was promoted in a nationwide tour titled "Talk of the Town", which began in early 1994. American artist Richard Marx, wrote four songs on the album and was a special guest on the album, playing piano on "The Reason Why".

== Synopsis and writers ==
Of its four singles, only "Seemed Like A Good Idea (At The Time)" reached the top 20, peaking at No. 16. However, "Angels" and "Talk of the Town" remained fan favourites and fixtures in Farnham's live sets in future years. The album was produced by Ross Fraser and Farnham, who co-wrote many of the featured tracks. Other writers included Phil Buckle, Richard Marx, Jon Stevens, and Russell Morris. The album featured a classic reworking of the Alice Cooper hit Only Women Bleed.

== Track listing ==
1. "Angels" (T. Kimmel, J. Kimball) – 5:47
2. "Seemed Like a Good Idea (At the Time)" (R. Wilson, J. Farnham, R. Fraser) – 4:19
3. "Only Women Bleed" (Alice Cooper, Dick Wagner) – 4:23
4. "Talent for Fame" (J. Farnham, R. Fraser, R. Marx) – 4:39
5. "When All Else Fails" (J. Farnham, R. Fraser, P. Buckle) – 4:54
6. "What You Don't Know" (J. Farnham, P. Buckle, R. Fraser) – 3:19
7. "Treated This Way" (J. Farnham, R. Marx, P. Buckle, R. Fraser) – 4:11
8. "Always the Same" (J. Farnham, R. Fraser, J. Stevens, S. Fraser) – 4:07
9. "The Reason Why" (R. Marx. P. Buckle) – 3:43
10. "So Long in Love" (R. Marx, J. Farnham, P. Buckle, R. Fraser) – 4:35
11. "It All Comes Back to You" (D. Brown, D. Batteau, J. Farnham, R. Fraser) – 4:27
12. "Diamonds" (R. Morris, J. Farnham, R. Fraser) – 4:36
13. "Rolling Home" (H. Bogdanovs, C. Thompsen) – 4:15
14. "Talk of the Town" (S. Howard) – 3:43

== Personnel ==
Credited to:

- John Farnham – vocals, keys (tracks 5–6, 8, 11, 13), percussion (tracks 1, 5, 11), drums (8), drum program (track 12)
- Phil Buckle – guitars (tracks 1–8, 10–14)
- Angus Burchall – drums (track 4, 6–7, 11, 13–14), lager phone (track 14)
- Ross Fraser – keys (tracks 1–2, 5–6, 8–9, 11–12), loops (tracks 1–3, 5, 10–11, 13), bass guitar (tracks 1, 3), additional guitars (track 3), programming (track 8), drum program (track 12), guitar (track 13)
- Michael Hegerty – bass guitar (tracks 2, 4–8, 10, 12–14)
- David Hirschfelder – keys (tracks 1–2, 4, 7), organ (track 10)
- Annie Crummer – vocals (tracks 1, 3–8, 11–12, 14)
- Lisa Edwards – vocals (tracks 3–8, 11–12, 14)
- Lindsay Field – vocals (tracks 2–8, 11, 13–14)
- Richard Marx – piano (track 9)
- Steve Williams – sax (track 10), brass arrangement (track 10)
- Robbie Burke – sax (track 10)
- Anthony Norris – trumpet (track 10)
- Darrell Brown – additional keys (track 11)
- Justin Brady – violin (track 14)
- Mastered by Don Bartley at Studio 301, Sydney

== Charts ==
=== Weekly charts ===
Chart (1993/94)	Peak position
Australian Albums (ARIA)	1

=== Year-end charts ===
Then Again was the highest selling album by an Australian artist in Australia in 1993.

Chart (1993)	Position
Australian Albums (ARIA)	8
Chart (1994)	Position
Australian Albums (ARIA)	27

== Certifications ==
Region	Certification	Certified units/sales
Australia (ARIA)	4× Platinum	280,000^{^}
^{^} Shipments figures based on certification alone.

== See also ==
- List of number-one albums of 1993 (Australia)
