= Jack (album) =

Studio album by John Farnham
- Released: 15 October 2010
- Recorded: July–September 2010
- Genre: Pop; rock; soul
- Length: 43:14
- Label: Sony BMG; RCA
- Producer: Ross Fraser; John Farnham

John Farnham chronology
The Essential John Farnham 3.0 (2009)	Jack (2010)	The Acoustic Chapel Sessions (2011)

Singles from Jack
- 1. "Hit the Road Jack" / "Fever" Released: September 2010

Jack is the twentieth studio album by Australian singer John Farnham. The album was released in Australia on 15 October 2010, and supported by a series of performances, John Farnham Live!. The album has seven new tracks and four cover versions of tracks by Eddy Arnold, Percy Sledge, Jerry Vale, Curtis Mayfield and Ray Charles. It peaked at No. 2 on the ARIA Albums Chart and, at the end of the year, it was certified gold by ARIA for shipment of 35000 copies.

The first single from the album, which made its digital and analogue radio debut on 24 September 2010, is "Hit the Road Jack"/"Fever" medley. Farnham performed it live on TV programme, The Footy Show (AFL). A teaser trailer for the album was posted to his official web site, and YouTube Channel on 23 September 2010.

== Reception ==
Professional ratings
Review scores
Source	Rating
AllMusic	2.5/5 stars

Jon O'Brien from AllMusic rated Jack at two-and-a-half stars out-of five and observed, "Rejuvenated by his show-stopping duet with Coldplay at 2009's Sound Relief, Australia's most successful solo artist John Farnham, returns for his first new studio album in five years... [and] sees the former teen pop idol and Little River Band frontman embrace a previously hidden swing-blues side for the first time in his 40-year career." adding "overall, Farnham ... just isn't the right one to sing these types of songs, while its hodgepodge of busily arranged covers and limp original efforts ensures that Jack is a lackluster comeback that fails to build on his recent credible endorsements."

== Track listing ==
Title	Writer/s	Running Time	Original Artist
"Love Chooses You"	Laurie Lewis	4:31	
"You Took My Love"	Steve Booker, Pixie Lott, Karen Poole	3:53	
"Hit the Road Jack"/"Fever"	Percy Mayfield, Eddie Cooley Otis Blackwell	4:21	Ray Charles/Peggy Lee
"247365"	John Herron / Gregg Sutton	3:38	
"Nobody Gets Me Like You"	Glenn Cunningham	4:04	
"You Don't Know Me	Cindy Walker	2:59	Eddy Arnold/Jerry Vale
"Love Me Like You Do"	Glenn Cunningham	3:12	
"Today"	Beth Hart, John Herron, Gregg Sutton	4:42	
"I'm the One Who Loves You"	Stuart Hamblen	3:28	Stuart Hamblin
"Love Come Knockin'"	David Malloy, Gregg Sutton	3:35	
"Sunshine"	Glenn Cunningham	4:52	

== Charts ==
=== Weekly charts ===
Chart (2010–11)	Peak position
Australian Albums (ARIA)	2

=== Year-end charts ===
Chart (2009)	Position
Australian Albums (ARIA)	60

== Certifications ==
Region	Certification	Certified units/sales
Australia (ARIA)	Gold	35,000^{^}
^{^} Shipments figures based on certification alone.
