= J.P. Farnham Sings =

Studio album by Johnny Farnham
- Released: 11 July 1975
- Recorded: February−April 1975
- Genre: Pop
- Label: EMI Music
- Producer: Peter Dawkins

Johnny Farnham chronology
Johnny Farnham Sings Hits from the Movies (1974)	J.P. Farnham Sings (1975)	Johnny Farnham's Greatest Hits (1976)

J.P. Farnham Sings is the 10th studio album by British-born Australian pop singer John Farnham (known then as Johnny Farnham). The album was released in July 1975.

== Background ==
Farnham recorded his last studio album for EMI, which was released in July.

== Track listing ==
Side A

1. "Some People Sing" (Peter Dawkins)
2. "I Must Stay" (Ross Ryan)
3. "Don't Rock The Boat (You Have To Go Gently)" (Russell Morris)
4. "Till Time Brings Change" (Graham Loundes)
5. "Saturday Dance" (Mike McClellan)
6. "Most People I Know (Think That I'm Crazy)" (Billy Thorpe)

Side B

1. "Show Me The Way" (Brian Cadd, Don Mudie)
2. "Running to the Sea" (Corben Simpson)
3. "Things To Do" (Harry Vanda, George Young)
4. "I Can't Fly" (Colleen Hewett)
5. "To Be Or Not To Be" (Johnny Farnham)
6. "So Many Years" (Graham Wardrop)
