= Sadie (album) =

Studio album by Johnny Farnham
- Released: April 1968
- Recorded: September 1967–January 1968
- Genre: Pop
- Labels: EMI, Columbia
- Producer: David Mackay

Johnny Farnham chronology
Sadie (album) (1968)	Everybody Oughta Sing a Song (1968)

Singles from Sadie
- 1. "Sadie" Released: November 1967; 2. "Friday Kind Of Monday" Released: March 1968

Sadie is the debut studio album by Australian pop singer John Farnham (billed then as Johnny Farnham) it was released by EMI Records in April 1968. The lead single, "Sadie (The Cleaning Lady)" had been released in November 1967, it was No. 1 on the Go-Set National Singles Charts for five weeks, and was the largest selling single in Australia by an Australian artist in the 1960s. The single, "Sadie (The Cleaning Lady)" sold approximately 180,000 copies in Australia, and was also released in New Zealand, Denmark and Germany. The second follow up album single was Jeff Barry/Ellie Greenwichs "Friday Kind of Monday" included on the album and was released in March as a double-A side with a cover of Flanagan and Allens, "Underneath the Arches" (non-album track) as Farnham's second single, which peaked at No. 6.

== Track listing ==
Side A

1. "Friday Kind of Monday" (Jeff Barry, Ellie Greenwich) – 2:44
2. "Are You Havin' Any Fun?" (Sammy Fain, Jack Yellen) – 2:10
3. "Turn Around" (Farnham, David Mackay) – 2:25
4. "Painting a Shadow" (Rodney Bainbridge, Brian Pritchard) – 2:10
5. "Pay The Waiter" (Hans Poulsen) – 2:31
6. "There's Got To Be a Word" (Don Ciccone) – 2:06

Side B

1. "Sadie (The Cleaning Lady)" (Ray Gilmore, John Medora, David White) – 3:17
2. "Woman, Woman" (Jim Glaser, Jimmy Payne) – 3:13 (a cover of Gary Puckett & the Union Gap)
3. "The Old Bazaar in Cairo" (Clinton Ford, Charlie Chester, Ken Morris) – 1:53
4. "Come On Back To Me" (Farnham) – 1:39
5. "Miss Elaine E.S. Jones" (Paul Nicodemus) – 2:31
6. "Otherwise It's Been a Perfect Day" (Farnham) – 2:30
