= Have a Little Faith (In Us) =

Single by John Farnham

from the album Romeo's Heart
- Released: March 1996
- Studio: Gotham Audio
- Length: 5:08
- Label: Wheatley, RCA, Sony BMG
- Songwriter(s): Arnie Roman, Russ DeSalvo
- Producer(s): Ross Fraser

John Farnham singles chronology
"The Reason Why" (1994)	"Have a Little Faith (In Us)" (1996)	"A Simple Life" (1996)

"Have a Little Faith (In Us)" (sometimes known as simply Have a Little Faith) is a song by Australian pop rock singer John Farnham. It was released in March 1996 as the lead single from his 16th studio album Romeo's Heart. The song peaked at number 3 on the ARIA Charts.

== Track listing ==
Australian CD/7" single

1. "Have a Little Faith (In Us)" - 5:08
2. "Have a Little Faith (In Us)" (Acoustic version) - 5:01
3. "Cool Water" - 3:58

== Charts ==
Chart (1996)	Peak position
Australia (ARIA)	3
