= Romeo's Heart =

Studio album by John Farnham
- Released: 3 June 1996
- Genres: Pop, rock
- Length: 51:58
- Labels: Sony BMG, RCA, Gotham
- Producer: Ross Fraser

John Farnham chronology
Then Again... (1993)	Romeo's Heart (1996)	Anthology 1: Greatest Hits 1986-1997 (1997)

Singles from Romeo's Heart
- 1. "Have a Little Faith" Released: March 1996; 2. "A Simple Life" Released: May 1996; 3. "Heart's On Fire" Released: September 1996; 4. "Don't Let It End" Released: December 1996; 5. "All Kinds of People" Released: May 1997

Romeo's Heart is a studio album by Australian singer John Farnham. The album was released in Australia on 3 June 1996 and was Farnham's first studio album since the release of Then Again... in 1993.

This album peaked in the ARIA charts at No. 2 and was four times platinum.

It won the ARIA Award for Best Adult Contemporary Album at the ARIA Music Awards of 1996. This album produced five singles in total Including: (A Simple Life), (Hearts On Fire), (Don't Let It End), (All Kind Of People) and "Have a Little Faith (In Us)" which gained the most commercial success, reaching No. 3 in March.

== Track listing ==
No.	Title	Writer(s)	Length
1.	"Have a Little Faith (In Us)"	Russ DeSalvo; Arnie Roman	5:08
2.	"Little Piece of My Heart"	Camus Celli; Andres Levin; Jack Ponti	4:52
3.	"A Simple Life"	Jon Lind; Richard Page	3:58
4.	"All Kinds Of People"	Eric Pressley; Sheryl Crow; Kevin Gilbert	5:16
5.	"Romeo's Heart"	Jennifer Kimball; Randy VanWarmer	4:18
6.	"Don't Let It End"	Aaron Hendra	4:41
7.	"Hearts On Fire"	Tom Kimmel; Stan Lynch	4:48
8.	"Hard Promises To Keep"	Kimmie Rhodes	5:45
9.	"Over My Head"	Richard Pleasance; Andrew Tanner	5:46
10.	"May You Never"	John Martyn	3:50
11.	"Second Skin"	John Farnham; Ross Fraser; Chong Lim	3:41

== Personnel ==
Credited to:

- John Farnham – vocals
- Lindsay Field – vocals
- Lisa Edwards – vocals
- Joe Creighton – bass, vocals
- Brett Garsed – guitars, vocals
- Stuart Fraser – guitars
- Chong Lim – keyboards
- Angus Burchall – drums
- Steve Williams – harmonica

== Charts ==
=== Weekly charts ===
Chart (1996/97)	Peak position
Australian Albums (ARIA)	2

=== Year-end charts ===
Chart (1996)	Position
Australian Albums (ARIA)	10

== Certifications ==
Region	Certification	Certified units/sales
Australia (ARIA)	4× Platinum	280,000^{^}
^{^} Shipments figures based on certification alone.
