= Darryl Sambell =

- Born: Darryl Lloyd Sambell; 26 November 1945; Gawler, South Australia, Australia
- Died: 19 September 2001 (aged 55) Gold Coast, Queensland, Australia
- Genre: Pop
- Occupations: Talent manager; music promoter; race horse owner
- Years active: 1965–2000

Darryl Lloyd Sambell (26 November 1945 – 19 September 2001) was an Australian accountant, talent manager and music promoter from the mid-1960s.

In 1967 Samball established the "Australian Musicians Booking Organisation" (AMBO), with fellow talent agents, Gary Spry and Jeff Joseph, to act as a music promoter for their artists.

He initially managed Bev Harrell, The Masters Apprentices in 1968–69 as well as Zoot. His longest lasting management relationship was with teen pop idol, Johnny Farnham, for the early part of Farnham's career from 1967 until 1976.

Sambell, a heavy smoker, was diagnosed with lung cancer in early 2001. He died of the disease later that year, aged 55.

== Biography ==
Sambell was born on 26 November 1945 to Ivy Irene (née Haynes, 1913–2011) and Donald George Sambell (1918-1984). He grew up in Gawler, South Australia with an older brother and two younger sisters. He attended Gawler Primary School where, in 1954, he was awarded a prize for 'Outstanding Citizenship'. By the early 1960s he was an accountant for a concreting business in Adelaide.

In 1965 Sambell started managing Bev Harrell. The singer briefly joined Adelaide-based pop-rockers, the Clefs in 1966 as co-lead vocalist. In April 1967 Sambell was in Cohuna, Victoria to see Harrell perform at a dance when they heard her support act Melbourne band "Strings Unlimited" Sambell was impressed by their lead singer, Johnny Farnham, and arranged to become his manager a month later. Farnham's early solo performances were in Adelaide, but soon Sambell relocated to Melbourne. Late in 1967 Sambell established the Australian Musicians Booking Organisation (AMBO), with fellow talent managers, Gary Spry and Jeff Joseph, to act as music promoters for their artists. In September of that year Sambell organised Farnham's signing to EMI Records.

Farnham's first commercially successful recording was a cover of British novelty song, "Sadie (The Cleaning Lady)", Sambell later recalled, "I just thought, 'you've got to be joking'. I could not get the words out of my mind." EMI's in house producer, David Mackay, insisted on recording it and it was released in November 1967. By arrangement with Sambell, Melbourne radio DJ Stan Rofe pretended that he disliked "Sadie" before playing it. In January of the following year it peaked at No. 1 on Go-Set National Top 40 for five weeks.

In Go-Set in January 1968, Farnham described Sambell, "My manager is pretty good to me. He irons my clothes, washes them, too. Packs all my cases and carries all 27 of them." According to a newspaper report, in June 1969, Farnham was suing Sambell for monies owed, amounting to $30,000. Farnham's father had initiated legal proceedings when his accountant had checked his son's financial records. After returning from their current tour, Sambell provided the missing receipts, the case never went to court and Farnham told media, "There's no ill feeling at all. It is unfortunate that this happened, and I stress that there are absolutely no plans for changing my management."

In mid-1968 Sambell had taken over the management of pop, rock band, the Masters Apprentices, which had formed in Adelaide but was based in Melbourne. According to Duncan Kimball of Milesago website, "it turned out to be a mixed blessing. He was a master networker and great at getting publicity... He was also a partner in the newly-formed AMBO booking agency... this proved very helpful for concert bookings. But in the long run Sambell was more interested in promoting Farnham's career... Sambell's pop tastes were also were [sic] at odds with the developing progressive direction of the Masters' music."

Late in 1968 he took over management of another Adelaide-formed pop, rock band, Zoot. Sambell had already worked with Zoot in Adelaide in 1965 when they were known as Down the Line and had used them as a backing band for Harrell's early performances. He also used them in mid-1967 to back Farnham on his demo recordings prior to signing with EMI. The Masters Apprentices and Zoot had been rivals in Adelaide, further animosity occurred as both groups competed at the Hoadley's Battle of the Sounds, "when Zoot refused to let the Masters use some of their equipment." The Masters Apprentices' bass guitarist, Glenn Wheatley, took over their management and promotion, early in 1970, before they relocated to England in mid-year.

Sambell worked with Farnham into the 1970s where the artist branched out into TV series and stage musicals. Sambell was Farnham's best man at his wedding to Jillian Billman, a former musical theatre dancer, in April 1973. Sambell disapproved of the wedding: Australian music critic, Ed Nimmervoll, opined, "it's a symbol of just how out of touch Sambell had become with Farnham's needs personally as well as professionally." He had denied news reports of the imminent wedding and disrupted Farnham's plan to have a double wedding ceremony alongside his sister, Judith, who was due to marry her fiancé on their originally scheduled date in March. Sambell explained in 1999, "With John, and with everything I've ever done, I wanted everything to be sensational and done correctly."

In January 1976 Sambell and Farnham parted ways, and Sambell travelled to New Zealand a few days later. Sambell managed a pop singer, Richard Wilde, leader of the band Wilde and Reckless before they relocated to Australia in late 1970s. Wilde later worked under his birth name Richard Wilkins as a celebrity reporter. Sambell later managed cricketer, Martin Crowe, and continued the involvement in the horse racing industry which dated back to his time with Farnham - the two owned a horse named Seascape - including an interest in Bonecrusher. He remained in New Zealand for 12 years and returned to live in Australia in the Gold Coast region. Sambell was diagnosed with lung cancer early in 2001, and died of the disease in September of that year, aged 55.

In 2024 Farnham claimed that Sambell routinely drugged him with amphetamines and sleeping pills, and was frequently 'aggressively sexual' towards Farnham.
