= John Farnham =

Australian singer (born 1949)

John Farnham AO
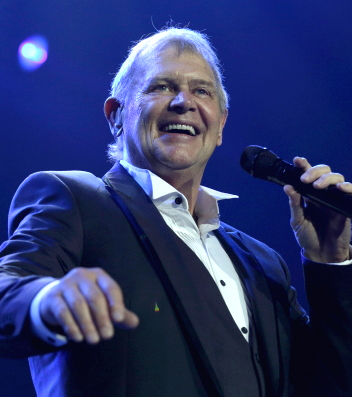
- Farnham in Brisbane, March 2014
- Born: John Peter Farnham; 1 July 1949 (age 77); Dagenham, Essex, England
- Occupations: Singer; songwriter; actor; TV presenter
- Years active: 1964–2025
- Spouse: Jillian Billman (m. 1973)
- Children: Robert; James
- Musical career
- Origin: Melbourne, Australia
- Genres: Pop rock; adult contemporary; soft rock; soul; R&B
- Instruments: Vocals
- Labels: Columbia; EMI; RCA; Axis; Wheatley; BMG; Gotham; Sony
- Formerly of: The Mavericks; Strings Unlimited; Little River Band
- Website: johnfarnham.com.au

John Peter Farnham (born 1 July 1949), is a British-born Australian singer, actor, and television personality. As Johnny Farnham, he was a teen pop idol from 1967 to 1979 and thereafter was an adult contemporary entertainer, becoming one of Australia's best-known and most popular performers and the only Australian musical artist to have a number-one single or album in each of six consecutive decades. He was managed by Darryl Sambell from 1967 to 1976 and by his long-term friend Glenn Wheatley from 1980 until Wheatley's death in 2022. Farnham married former dancer Jillian Billman in 1973 and the couple have two children.

Farnham's first commercially successful recording was the American-written novelty song "Sadie (The Cleaning Lady)". Released in November 1967 the song gave Farnham widespread recognition in Australia. He subsequently replaced Glenn Shorrock as lead singer of Little River Band (LRB) from 1982 to 1986 but otherwise has worked mostly as a solo artist. In November 1986 his solo single "You're the Voice" peaked at No. 1 on the Australian singles charts, and the associated album, Whispering Jack, held the number-one position on the album charts for a total of 25 weeks. Whispering Jack is the third-highest-selling album in Australian history and as of September 2026 remains the highest-selling album in Australia by any Australian artist. Both the single and the album also had international success, with the album reaching No. 6 in the United Kingdom and No. 1 in Sweden. Farnham's other number-one recordings are the singles "Raindrops Keep Fallin' on My Head" (1970) and "Age of Reason" (1988), and the albums Age of Reason (1988), Chain Reaction (1990), Then Again... (1993), 33⅓ (2000), The Last Time (2002), and Two Strong Hearts Live (2015). He has toured with numerous artists including the Seekers, Stevie Nicks, and Lionel Richie, and has released three collaborative albums with Olivia Newton-John and one with Tom Jones.

Farnham has been recognised with numerous honours and awards, including Australian of the Year (1987), Officer of the Order of Australia (1996), 22 ARIA Music Awards (including his 2003 induction into the ARIA Hall of Fame), and he was voted 'King of Pop' by TV Week magazine readers for five consecutive years from 1969 to 1973. Aside from his recording career Farnham has acted in musical theatre with lead roles in Australian productions of Charlie Girl (1971), Pippin (1974), and Jesus Christ Superstar (1992). He starred in his own TV series and specials, including It's Magic (with Colleen Hewett, 1974), Bobby Dazzler (1977–78), and Farnham and Byrne (with Debra Byrne, 1980), as well as appearing as a guest on numerous television shows, including The Don Lane Show, Countdown, and Hey Hey It's Saturday.

Farnham has not performed publicly since February 2020. In August 2022 a cancerous tumour was successfully removed from his mouth in an operation involving jaw reconstruction. His autobiography The Voice Inside (2024), was co-written with Poppy Stockell. In May 2026 Farnham announced that, "because of the surgeries to my mouth and face over the past few years, singing on stage is not something I can consider again". On 20 September 2026 numerous local and international artists presented a tribute concert, The Songs of John Farnham: A Living Legend. However, Farnham was unable to attend due to his poor health.

== Early life ==
Farnham was born in Mile End Hospital, Dagenham, Essex, England on 1 July 1949 to John Peter Farnham Sr – a worker at Ford's motor assembly plant – and Rose Farnham (née Pemberton). He is the eldest of four children, with his sisters Jean and Jacqueline born in Britain and his brother Steven born in Australia after the family moved there when Farnham was nine years old. He was given a plastic guitar to amuse himself when confined to bed with pneumonia as a six-year-old, and in the following years he performed publicly across Essex.

Farnham's family emigrated to Australia in May 1959 on the SS Orsova to live in Noble Park, Victoria with his father's elder sister Mary, accompanied on the voyage out by his uncles Alf and Chris and his paternal grandparents John and Mary. Soon after arriving in Australia his mother, aunt, and grandmother won £A10,000 in a lottery and used the money to build two family homes in Noble Park. Farnham attended Yarraman Park State School (now Yarraman Oaks Primary School) in Noble Park East, and Lyndale Primary School (now Lyndale Greens Primary School) and Lyndale High School in Dandenong North.

== Musical career ==
=== The Mavericks and Strings Unlimited: 1964–67 ===
Early in his career he was billed as Johnny Farnham and performed with local band the Mavericks from 1964 while still attending school. Playing on weekends, the band had a five-song repertoire and mostly played at school socials. He left school at the age of 16 to become a plumber's apprentice.

In late 1965 Farnham joined the group Strings Unlimited, a group which used only string instruments. Soon after they gained a regular booking at a local hotel. In 1966, after making the Victorian state finals of Hoadley's Battle of the Sounds, the band recorded a three-track demo tape with Farnham on vocals, Joe Cincotta on bass guitar, Mike Foenander on keyboards, Peter Foggie on drums, Stewart Male on lead guitar, and Barry Roy on rhythm guitar. On 29 April 1967 Strings Unlimited performed as a backing band for pop singer Bev Harrell in Cohuna, Victoria. Harrell's manager and then-boyfriend Darryl Sambell was impressed with Farnham's vocals and offered to become his manager.

Initially performing in Sambell's home town of Adelaide, Farnham recorded an advertising jingle for the airline company Ansett-ANA entitled "Susan Jones" (backed by the Susan Jones Rock Five), and was offered a solo record contract with EMI under house producer David Mackay. In mid-1967 Sambell had used Adelaide group, Down the Line, to back Farnham on his demo tapes. Down the Line members were Beeb Birtles on vocals and bass guitar, Daryl Cotton on lead vocals and guitar, John D'Arcy on lead guitar and vocals, and Ted Higgins on drums; they changed their name to Zoot and were managed by Sambell.

=== Teen pop idol: 1967–79 ===
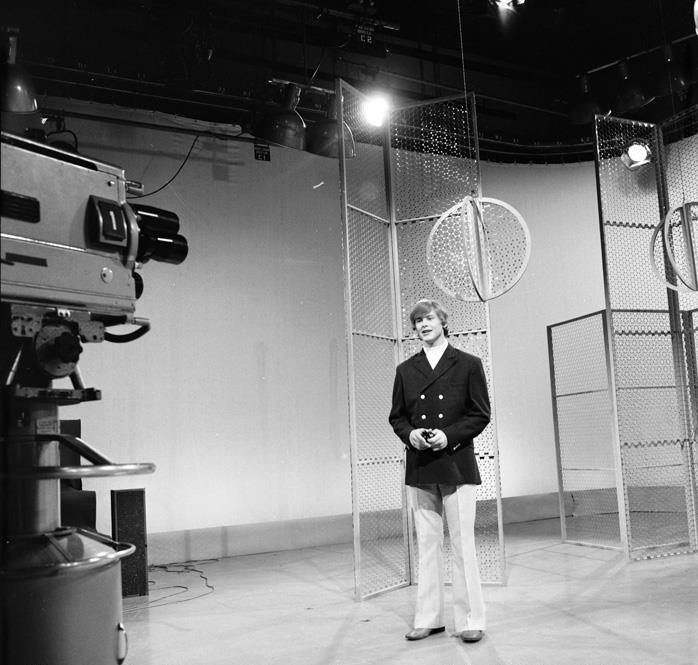
Johnny Farnham performing on ABC-TV in 1968.

Farnham's first commercially successful recording was an American-written novelty song, "Sadie (The Cleaning Lady)". Sambell disliked it as the lyrics were so persistent, but MacKay insisted and the single was released in November 1967. It's B-side, "In My Room", was written by Farnham, and was one of the demo tapes recorded with Down the Line. He had quit his plumber's apprenticeship on 23 November 1967, the day before it was issued.

Sambell arranged with Melbourne radio DJ Stan Rofe to pretend that the latter disliked "Sadie" before playing it on air, with Rofe continuing the ploy on the TV pop music show Uptight. However, Rofe's colleague on the teen-oriented pop magazine Go-Set – Molly Meldrum – praised Farnham's efforts, and fans responded with calls to play the song. It hit No. 1 on the Go-Set National Top 40 in January 1968 and remained there for 5 weeks, giving Farnham widespread recognition in Australia. Shipping 180,000 units in Australia, "Sadie" was the highest-selling single by an Australian artist in the 1960s and became the biggest-selling single in Australia to that time.

In 1968 Farnham released the double A-sided single "Underneath the Arches" / "Friday Kind of Monday" and "I Don't Want to Love You" / "Jamie", with both records reaching the Go-Set Top 10. In April 1968 he released his debut album Sadie on Columbia Records. Garry Raffaele of The Canberra Times reviewed the record and described its "gimmick" singer thus: "[he] has little wrong with his voice. Slightly nasal, it nonetheless hits each note with a fair degree of accuracy. But he never becomes involved with a lyric." Although disappointed with Sadie overall, Raffaele praised its arrangements by Johnny Hawker and nominated "Friday Kind of Monday" as its best song.

In 1969 Farnham released a cover of Harry Nilsson's 1968 single "One", with the Australian's rendition peaking at No. 4. At that time TV Week magazine ran an annual pop poll to determine the King of Pop, first won by Normie Rowe in 1967 and again in 1968, with Farnham then winning the title five consecutive times from 1969 to 1973. In December 1969 his cover version of B.J. Thomas's hit "Raindrops Keep Fallin' on My Head" became his second number-one hit, and Meldrum privately advised Farnham and Sambell to leave Australia for the international market. Meldrum had relocated to London in December 1969 and in January 1970 he publicly invited Farnham to England via Go-Set. In April of that year Meldrum lamented, "If Farnham doesn't go, he can only look forward to entertaining drunks in hotels and nightclubs as a future". However, Sambell advised Farnham that he was not ready to try overseas.

In October 1970 Farnham's single "Comic Conversations" peaked at No. 10. During 1971 he teamed up with Allison Durbin – winner of the Most Popular Female Performer at the King of Pop awards from 1969 to 1971 – and they released the duet album Together in September, and then the single "Baby, Without You" in November. Both peaked in the top 30 of their respective charts.

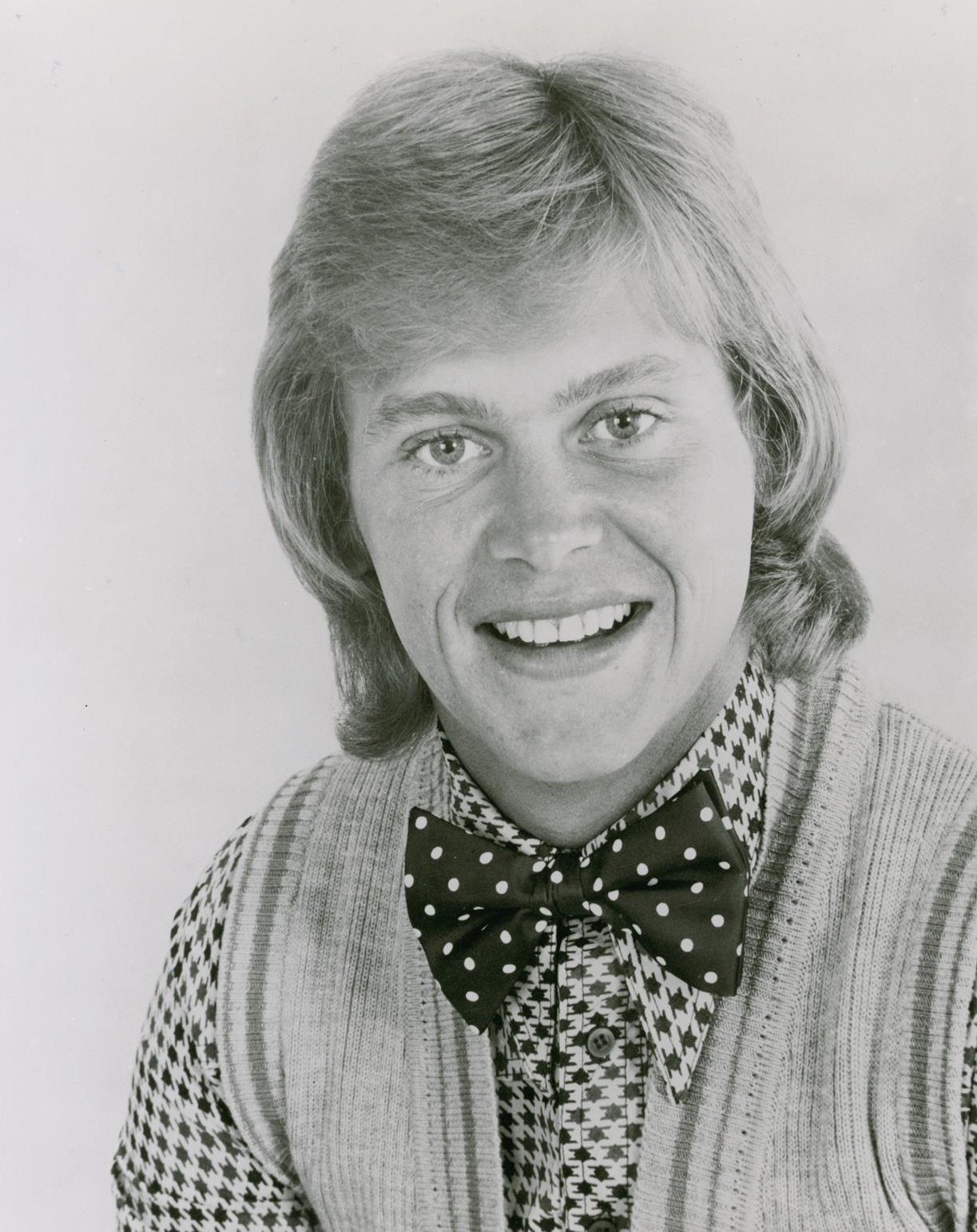
Farnham, c. 1971.

In addition to his recording career and appearing on television variety shows as either a guest performer or a host, Farnham also performed in stage musicals, starting in December 1969 by playing the titular hero in Dick Whittington and His Cat at Sydney Stadium. From September 1971 he starred as Joe Studholme in the Australian musical theatre production of Charlie Girl at Her Majesty's Theatre, Melbourne. And in 1972 Farnham was appointed King of Moomba at the age of 22, with former Australian rules footballer Lou Richards appointed his court jester. The Sun's Craig Bellamy described Farnham as a "likeable English migrant" who is "King of Pop, King of Kids, and today Johnny Farnham was King of Moomba." That same year he also had a top five national hit with a cover version of the title track from David Cassidy's international hit album Rock Me Baby.

The clean-cut pop star issued more singles and albums, but by the mid-1970s his recording output had reduced and he turned more to stage musicals and television. Farnham and Colleen Hewett – Queen of Pop for 1972 and 1973 – combined in the stage musical Pippin, and its associated show album in 1974. Also in that year the duo co-hosted the children's TV series It's Magic on Channel Ten. Farnham became familiar to viewers of the TV pop music show Countdown after hosting its first colour episode in early 1975 and introducing Skyhooks' performance of "Horror Movie". He also guested on the popular music and variety shows The Don Lane Show (1975–1983) and Hey Hey It's Saturday (1971–1999).

Farnham's relations with his manager Sambell became strained and in January 1976 they announced their split. Back in June 1969 Farnham's father had begun a lawsuit against Sambell for monies owed to his then-underage son, when the age of majority was 21. The case was finally dropped in December 1975 with terms not disclosed, and Sambell relocated to New Zealand for 12 years. After this separation Farnham first turned to Kenn Brodziak, producer of Pippin, for management from 1976 to 1978 and then subsequently to Danny Finley, Hewett's then-husband but no relation to the "Panama Red" Danny Finley of Kinky Friedman and the Texas Jew Boys fame. During this time Farnham starred as the titular character in the comedy TV series Bobby Dazzler (1977–1978) and narrated the documentary series Survival with Johnny Farnham (1977). His singing career became centred on the cabaret circuit and stage musicals, and in 1979 he shortened his stage name to John Farnham. But the collapse of a restaurant venture he had opened in mid-1979 with Finley and Hewett put him in financial difficulty from unpaid taxes, and the Farnhams sold their holiday farm and family home to clear the debts.

=== "Help" and Little River Band: 1980–86 ===
Farnham signed with Glenn Wheatley – the former bass guitarist of 1960s rock group the Masters Apprentices – as his manager in January 1980. Farnham had originally met Wheatley when both acts were managed by Sambell, and Wheatley had been managing Little River Band (LRB) since March 1975. They decided that Farnham's comeback single would be a reworking of the Beatles' hit "Help!", which was produced by LRB guitarist and vocalist Graeham Goble. It was released in June 1980 and peaked at No. 8. By now Farnham had adopted a more adult contemporary pop style, and his 1980 album Uncovered, also produced by Goble, peaked at No. 20. The studio band for the album consisted of guitarist Tommy Emmanuel (ex-Southern Star Band), keyboardist Mal Logan (ex-Renée Geyer Band and LRB), drummer Derek Pellicci (LRB) and bass guitarist Barry Sullivan (ex-Chain and LRB). This line-up became Farnham's tour band until Logan and Pellicci returned to their LRB commitments and were replaced by Sam McNally and David Jones respectively. Also in 1980, Farnham appeared in the TV series Farnham and Byrne with former Young Talent Time teen star and 1974 Queen of Pop, Debra Byrne. In 1981 Farnham released three further solo singles but none reached the top 50. On the B-side of his non-album single "Too Much Too Soon" was another of Farnham's songwriting efforts, "Jillie's Song", co-written with Goble. And despite having received offers from American record labels to relocate there none were accepted.

After Glenn Shorrock left Little River Band, Farnham became LRB's lead vocalist in February 1982 on recommendations from Goble and Wheatley. He initially resisted the idea of joining LRB but Wheatley had convinced him that Shorrock had approved the replacement, and this change continued Farnham's move away from cabaret into adult contemporary pop-rock music. LRB recorded three studio albums with Farnham, but their modest commercial success was not enough to pay back the record company's advances. Farnham had no input other than recording lead vocals on his first studio album with LRB, The Net, since it had already been written. His biggest Australian hits with LRB were the 1982 single "Down on the Border", which peaked at No. 7, and The Net which peaked at No. 11 on the albums charts in 1983. The LRB albums with Farnham's vocals that charted on Billboard 200 in the US were Greatest Hits (1982), The Net (1983), and Playing to Win (1985), and the band's charting singles with Farnham in the US were "The Other Guy" (1982), "We Two", "You're Driving Me Out of My Mind" (both 1983), and "Playing to Win" (1984).

In October 1983 after their four-night tenure at Universal Amphitheatre, Los Angeles, Farnham railed against the bickering of fellow band members, Birtles (guitars, vocals) and Goble, and their restrictions imposed on his own performances. Birtles left LRB at the end of that month due to his conflict with Goble over their shift in music style to "harder, more progressive music" and Birtles' preference for Shorrock's over Farnham's vocals. According to Farnham, "Playing to Win" "was about my frustration in the band, about wanting out, not wanting to be there any more. There was a bit of in-fighting and we were doing it hard on the road. That's what inspired the song". As a result Farnham's relationship with remaining band members soured further and songwriting disputes over the song escalated.

According to Jeff Apter's unauthorised biography Playing to Win (2016), "Even though 'Playing to Win', a rocking anthem and a real statement of intent was [Farnham]'s by the time it had been through the LRB production blender, every member of the band had a share". Goble analysed the song to determine who owned what and the proportion of royalties each deserved, meticulously dividing the song's royalties between Farnham (55.5%), LRB's Goble, Wayne Nelson (bass guitar, vocals), Stephen Housden (guitars), David Hirschfelder (keyboards) and Steve Prestwich (drums), and producer Spencer Proffer.

During this time Farnham also supplied vocals on soundtracks for the films Savage Streets (1984), The Slugger's Wife (1985), and Fletch (1985). The song "Justice for One" was co-written by Farnham for Savage Streets and was issued as a solo single under his name in August 1984. LRB recorded a one hour long concert in Melbourne which aired in the United States on HBO and highlighted songs from The Net as well as reworked versions of earlier LRB singles "Cool Change" and "Reminiscing". Also included was "Please Don't Ask Me", a song written by Goble as a non-Top 50 single for Farnham back in January 1981, which was played during the "Australian-themed" opening of the concert. Farnham left the group following the completion of seven shows of their short Australian tour in April 1986, and LRB's third studio album with Farnham as lead vocalist, No Reins, appeared the following month.

=== Whispering Jack and "You're the Voice": 1986–87 ===
Farnham's first solo performance since 1981 was a live show in Tweed Heads in March 1986 while he was still with LRB, with his backing band consisting of Bruno Di Stanislo on bass guitar and vocals, Brett Garsed on lead guitar, Derek Pellicci on drums, and Sam See on guitar. Farnham had already started collecting a song list for a future solo album and sound engineer Ross Fraser advised Wheatley that it was time to start work on the album. But Wheatley was unable to secure a producer and record label and so Fraser took on the producer's role, Wheatley provided financial support by mortgaging his house, and they used Wheatley's own record label, Wheatley Records.

With Fraser's advice Farnham expanded his song list: "A Touch of Paradise" was co-written by Gulliver Smith and Mondo Rock's Ross Wilson, while "Pressure Down" was provided by Harry Bogdanovs. Another song on offer was "We Built This City" but Farnham knocked it back as unsuitable and it was later recorded by US band Starship. Two weeks before recording was due to end a demo tape containing "You're the Voice" arrived from London. Written by Andy Qunta (ex-Icehouse), Keith Reid (Procol Harum), Maggie Ryder, and Chris Thompson (ex-Manfred Mann's Earth Band), Farnham and Fraser knew that it was a once-in-a-lifetime song. The completed album's name of Whispering Jack originated in a visit Farnham paid to a US jazz club where he was mistakenly introduced as Jack Phantom. When he subsequently provided a running commentary for a local pool game he named himself "Whispering Jack Phantom" after the Pot Black commentator, "Whispering Ted Lowe". Hence Whispering Jack.

Public interest in the re-branded former teen idol was initially difficult to cultivate and most radio stations refused to play Farnham's new material. But after Sydney's 2Day FM played "You're the Voice" in September 1986 other radio stations responded to requests. The song's television debut was on Hey Hey It's Saturday with former Skyhooks member Greg Macainsh playing bass guitar. "You're the Voice" peaked at No. 1 in Australia, Germany, and Sweden, as well as reaching No. 3 in Switzerland, No. 6 in the UK, and No. 6 in Austria. The album Whispering Jack was released on 29 September 1986 and became the highest-selling album by an Australian artist in Australia to that date, peaking at No. 1 on the Australian Kent Music Report albums chart for a total of 25 weeks. Other singles from the album that charted in Australia were "Pressure Down", which reached No. 4 in December 1986, "Touch of Paradise" which reached No. 24 in March 1987, and "Reasons" which reached No. 60 in September 1987. The album was released internationally on RCA/BMG and peaked at No. 1 in Sweden, No. 3 in Austria, No. 6 in the UK, and No. 12 in Norway. The CD of Whispering Jack was the first Australian-made music CD released in Australia and renewed interest in the album, returning it to the top ten in August 1988, nearly two years after its release. In 2006 it was accredited with 24 times platinum status for shipments of over 1.68 million units in Australia alone.

Farnham followed the album's success with the Jack's Back Tour, with the John Farnham Band now consisting of Garsed on lead guitar, Hirschfelder on keyboards, Macainsh on bass guitar, and Angus Burchall on drums. An initial itinerary of eleven performances was thought to be enough considering they were competing with tours by Michael Jackson and Billy Joel, but after high ticket sales the tour was extended by a further eight shows using larger venues, making it the highest-grossing tour by an Australian act. In 1987 Farnham won six of the inaugural ARIA Music Awards for Album of the Year, Single of the Year, Highest Selling Album, Highest Selling Single, Best Male Artist, and Best Adult Contemporary Album, and at the 1986 Countdown Music and Video Awards Farnham won the Best Album, Best Single, Best Male Performance in a Video, and Outstanding Achievement. During this time he also continued soundtrack work on the films Rad (1986) and Voyage of the Rock Aliens (1987).

=== Age of Reason and Chain Reaction: 1988–90 ===
In July 1988 Farnham released the single "Age of Reason", which peaked at No. 1 on the ARIA singles charts, his last number-one single in Australia. Co-written by Johanna Pigott (Scribble) and her songwriting and domestic partner Todd Hunter (Dragon), it made Pigott the first Australian woman to write a number-one single. The album of the same name, produced by Fraser, debuted at No. 1 in August 1988 and stayed on top for eight weeks, becoming the highest-selling album in Australia for 1988. As of 1997 it was accredited 8 times platinum status for shipment of over 560,000 units. Internationally, Age of Reason peaked at No. 4 in Sweden and No. 9 in Norway. Other singles from the album that charted in Australia were "Two Strong Hearts", which reached No. 6, and "Beyond the Call".

At the 1988 ARIA Music Awards Farnham won Best Male Artist, Best Adult Contemporary Album for "Touch of Paradise" [sic], and an Outstanding Achievement Award. In March 1989 Farnham went to Moscow, USSR to promote Greenpeace's album Rainbow Warriors, part of an international ensemble including David Byrne (Talking Heads), Peter Gabriel, Chrissie Hynde (Pretenders), Annie Lennox (Eurythmics), and the Edge (U2). Farnham recorded the duet "Communication" with fellow Australian singer Dannielle Gaha, which peaked at No. 13 in Australia in September 1989. The song was used in promotional ads for the Australian government's The Drug Offensive program that sought to curb the illegal drug trade during the late 1980s.

Farnham's next album, Chain Reaction, was also produced by Fraser and was released in October 1990. It also debuted at No. 1 on the ARIA album charts and provided three top ten hits: "Chain Reaction" (August), "That's Freedom" (September), and "Burn for You" (December). Unlike his previous two albums where most songs were written by outside writers, Farnham co-wrote nine of the twelve tracks on Chain Reaction with Fraser and keyboardist/musical director Hirschfelder, as well as with Phil Buckle on "Burn for You" and Joe Crighton on "The Time Has Come". With a sound that was less electronic and more acoustic it became the biggest-selling album in Australia in 1990 and was No. 1 on the ARIA End of Year albums chart. At the 1991 ARIA Music Awards Farnham won Best Male Artist, Song of the Year for "Burn for You", and Highest Selling Album for Chain Reaction.

=== Full House to Tour of Duty: 1991–99 ===
Farnham's live album Full House was produced by Fraser and Farnham and released in November 1991. It contained concert material recorded from May 1987 to October 1990 and peaked at No. 2 on the ARIA albums chart. The live version of "Please Don't Ask Me" was released as a single and reached the Top 30. Fellow Australian singer Jimmy Barnes' album Soul Deep reached No. 1 on the albums chart and included a duet with Farnham on a cover version of "When Something is Wrong with My Baby", which also peaked at No. 3 on the singles chart.

During August and September 1992 Farnham performed in the title role of an Australian production of Tim Rice and Andrew Lloyd Webber's stage musical Jesus Christ Superstar. Fellow cast members included Angry Anderson as Herod, Kate Ceberano as Mary Magdalene, Russell Morris as Simon Zealotes, Jon Stevens as Judas, and John Waters as Pontius Pilate. The stage soundtrack, Jesus Christ Superstar The Album, provided the single "Everything's Alright" by Ceberano, Farnham, and Stevens, which peaked at No. 6 in September of that year.

In October 1993 Farnham released his next studio album, Then Again..., produced by Fraser and Farnham, which peaked at No. 1. Of its four singles only "Seemed Like a Good Idea (At the Time)" reached the Top 20. Then Again... won Highest Selling Album at the 1994 ARIA Music Awards. In March 1996 Farnham's single "Have a Little Faith (In Us)" peaked at No. 3. The associated album, Romeo's Heart, was released in June. Produced by Fraser it peaked at No. 2 and won Best Adult Contemporary Album at the 1996 ARIA Music Awards. In the following year Farnham collaborated with vocal group Human Nature to record "Everytime You Cry" which reached No. 3. Also in that year he issued a series of three compilation albums – Anthology 1: Greatest Hits 1986–1997; Anthology 2: Classic Hits 1967–1985 (Recorded Live); and Anthology 3: Rarities – which all reached the top 20, with Anthology 1 peaked at No. 1.

From October to December 1998 Farnham collaborated with fellow singers Olivia Newton-John and Anthony Warlow on The Main Event Tour. The resulting live album, Highlights from The Main Event, peaked at No. 1 in December and shipped 280,000 units to earn 4 times platinum status and win Highest Selling Album at the 1999 ARIA Music Awards. The Main Event concert was broadcast on 26 March 1999 on the Seven Network and was also released on VHS. From April to May 1999 Farnham undertook his I Can't Believe He's 50 Tour, supported by Merril Bainbridge, Kate Ceberano, Human Nature, James Reyne, Ross Wilson, and thrash metal band Nana-Zhami, which included his son Robert Farnham on guitar. A live album, Live at the Regent, was recorded on Farnham's 50th birthday on 1 July 1999 and was released in September, reaching No. 7 on the album chart.

On 21 December 1999 Farnham performed a set during the Tour of Duty concert in Dili, Timor-Leste for Australian troops serving with InterFET. Fellow performers were James Blundell, Dili Allstars, Gina Jeffreys, the Living End, Kylie Minogue, Doc Neeson, and the RMC Band. Although Tour of Duty was the first of Farnham's concerts to be webcast, the concert was also recorded. However, the tapes were misplaced and not re-discovered until over 20 years later, hence The Tour of Duty Concert for the Troops Live in Dili East Timor 21st December 1999 was issued on ANZAC Day, 25 April 2024.

=== Collaborations, concerts, and recordings: 2000–23 ===
In 2000 Farnham and Newton-John performed "Dare to Dream" during the Parade of Nations at the Opening Ceremony of the 2000 Sydney Olympics, with the broadcast of the ceremony viewed by an estimated 3.5 billion people around the world. On 11 September 2000 Farnham appeared as himself in the final episode of the Australian comedy TV series The Games, which focused on the Olympics.

From 6 November 2002 to 15 June 2003 Farnham embarked on his country-wide Last Time Tour, taking a circus-style tent to smaller towns and filling large entertainment venues in capital cities. It became the biggest-grossing tour in Australian history to that date, surpassing his previous Jack's Back Tour. In October 2002 he released an associated album, The Last Time, which reached No. 1 and achieved 3 times platinum status for its 210,000 shipments. Also in 2002 Farnham announced he would retire from full-scale national tours after The Last Time Tour, although he would still perform in concerts and record.

During July 2003 Farnham worked with Queen to create a new version of their song, "We Will Rock You" for the 2003 Rugby World Cup, and it was included on his greatest hits album One Voice. Media speculation that Queen would ask him to join the band was subsequently denied by both Farnham and Queen's Brian May. On 21 October 2003 he performed "You're the Voice" at the 2003 ARIA Music Awards, where he was inducted into the ARIA Hall of Fame. At that ceremony he also won Best Adult Contemporary Album for The Last Time. The previous year's Hall of Fame inductee was Olivia Newton-John, and the following year LRB were inducted, without Farnham,

During February 2005 Farnham combined with Welsh singer Tom Jones for the Together in Concert series, with ten shows in Perth, Sydney, Brisbane and Melbourne. The pair performed duets as well as their own solo hit songs. The resulting video album, John Farnham & Tom Jones – Together in Concert, was issued on DVD in May 2005, debuting at No. 1 on the ARIA Top 40 Music DVDs chart. A live album of the same name was released simultaneously on CD and peaked at No. 3 on the ARIA Albums chart. The announcement of the Farnham and Jones tour triggered an unsuccessful claim for damages from a fan, angry that The Last Time Tour was not in fact Farnham's last, as purported in its marketing. Consumer watchdog the Australian Competition & Consumer Commission (ACCC) took no further action on this complaint.

During the 2005 Melbourne Music Festival Farnham made an appearance at the Tsunami Benefit Concert to raise funds for rebuilding after the 2004 Indian Ocean earthquake. In November 2005 Farnham released I Remember When I Was Young: Songs from The Great Australian Songbook, which containing his covers of 13 hits written and performed by fellow Australian artists, which peaked at No. 2 on the ARIA albums charts. In February 2006 Farnham undertook four shows at the Sydney Opera House with the Sydney Symphony Orchestra, followed by shows at the Victorian Arts Centre's Hamer Hall in Melbourne. The concerts were sponsored by Dairy Farmers and a percentage of revenue went to Dairy Farmers' "Creating Greener Pastures" program to aid dairy farmers and their communities. The DVD John Farnham with the Sydney Symphony Orchestra was released in 2006 and reached No. 1 on the ARIA DVD chart.

Beginning on 18 February 2006, Farnham embarked on a small Australian tour with Fleetwood Mac singer Stevie Nicks. Both had equal billing, performed individually, and used the same backing singer, but did not duet together as on the Tom Jones shows. On 26 March 2006 Farnham sang at the 2006 Commonwealth Games closing ceremony in Melbourne, starting with his hit "Age of Reason", followed by "I Remember When I Was Young" from his most recent studio album "Playing to Win", and finishing with his anthemic song "You're the Voice". The full Whispering Jack concert was originally released on VHS in 1987, but the twentieth anniversary of Whispering Jack in 2006 was marked by an enhanced commemorative CD re-release plus a DVD featuring an edited version of the tour promoting the album. Whispering Jack subsequently re-entered the ARIA Top 50 in December 2006, November 2016, and August 2023, and as of May 2023 it remains the highest-selling album in Australia by an Australian act.

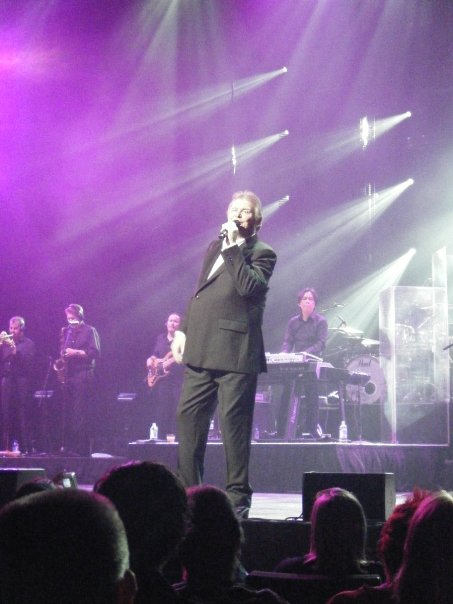
Farnham singing at the Queensland Performing Arts Centre on 4 October 2009 during the Live By Demand tour.

On 27 May 2009 Farnham announced the John Farnham – Live By Demand tour for September and October of that year. On 15 October 2010, Sony BMG released Farnham's new studio album Jack, his first studio album in over five years. Jack contained covers of material by Ray Charles, Curtis Mayfield, and Percy Sledge, and coincided with the indoor and outdoor performances of the John Farnham Live! tour throughout October and November.

In October and November 2011 Farnham embarked on a nationwide tour of Australia to celebrate the 25th anniversary of Whispering Jack. On 30 September, ahead of that tour, Farnham released the live album The Acoustic Chapel Sessions via Sony BMG, which had been recorded in Melbourne in July at Chapel Off Chapel. Containing both a CD and a DVD, the two-disc set has eleven songs re-recorded acoustically on the CD, with the DVD including eight songs, behind-the-scenes footage, and interviews with Farnham and the band. On 27 July 2012 Farnham performed live for the Australian Olympic team in London prior to the 2012 Olympic Games, singing "Playing to Win", "Pressure Down" and "You're the Voice".

In August 2014 he appeared in a one-off show with the Seekers as part of the Decades Festival, commemorating the music, fashion, and cars of the 1960s and coinciding with the Seekers' golden jubilee year. In 2015 Farnham re-joined Newton-John on the concert tour Two Strong Hearts Live, with the duo singing hits from Newton-John's film Grease, popular Farnham tracks, and renditions of popular songs such as "Over the Rainbow" and "Tenterfield Saddler". A live album, Highlights from Two Strong Hearts, and an associated DVD video album, Two Strong Hearts, were issued in June 2015 and both peaked at No. 1 on their respective charts. In the following year the pair collaborated for a Christmas-themed duet album, Friends for Christmas, which was issued in November 2016 and also reached No. 1.

Farnham and Newton-John were the last artists to perform at Fire Fight Australia – a 10-hour benefit concert at Stadium Australia, Sydney on 16 February 2020. Together with the other artists, they helped raise funds for victims of the 2019–20 Australian bushfire season. For the duo's rendition of the concert's finale, "You're the Voice", they were joined onstage by Indigenous singer, Mitch Tambo on lead vocals (singing its second verse in the Indigenous Gamilaraay language), Allan Mackenzie on didgeridoo, and Brian May on rhythm guitar. The associated various artists' live album, Artists Unite for Fire Fight was issued on 13 March 2020 and peaked at No. 1.

As of February 2020, Farnham's band members were musical director and keyboardist Chong Lim, Angus Burchall on drums, Brett Garsed on guitar and Craig Newman on bass guitar, with backing vocalists: Lindsay Field, Lisa Edwards, Susie Ahern, and Rod Davies. Previous long-serving members include Venetta Fields (backing vocals, 1987–1994) and Stuart Fraser. Fraser had died on 1 December 2019 after being diagnosed with lung cancer in 2016. In 2026 Whispering Jack (40th Anniversary Edition) reached No. 1 on the ARIA Top 50 On Replay Albums chart.

== Use of his music ==
In 2015 Farnham and Wheatley spoke out against "You're the Voice" being used by Reclaim Australia, an anti-Islamic group, having to do so again in 2020 with regard to the song's use at anti-lockdown rallies during the Stage 4 COVID-19 pandemic in Melbourne.

In September 2023 Farnham supported "You're the Voice" being used to advocate for the "Yes" campaign in the 2023 Australian Indigenous Voice referendum, a vote to change the Australian Constitution to enshrine a Voice to Parliament for Indigenous Australians. The song played on the soundtrack of a video advertisement directed by Indigenous filmmaker Warwick Thornton which was aired on both social media and digital television. On 10 October 2023 Farnham was one of 25 Australians of the Year who signed an open letter supporting the "Yes" vote. However, the referendum was defeated.

== Other activities ==
Farnham has supported several charities over the years, including Rwandan Refugees, Farm Aid, Community Aid Abroad, and the Starlight Foundation for children with terminal illnesses. Wheatley combined with session and touring musician, Lindsay Field to establish the various artists' charity album, The Spirit of Christmas, in 1993. Farnham contributed his version of "You'll Never Walk Alone" to the inaugural compilation. He supplied songs for most of the related album series of the same name, which continued annually (except 1997) until The Spirit of Christmas 2018. He headlined the 2019 Hay Mate series of concerts for Australia's farming community which raised over $4.4 million. He co-wrote the autobiography The Voice Inside, with Poppy Stockell, which won Book of the Year, Audiobook of the Year (also narrated by Farnham), and Biography of the Year at the 2025 Australian Book Industry Awards.

== Recognition and awards ==
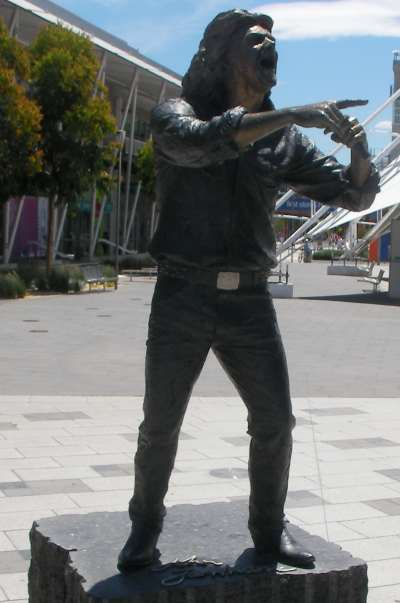
Statue of John Farnham, Melbourne Docklands

Farnham has both won and been nominated for numerous Australian music and entertainment awards, including 22 ARIA Awards from 65 nominations, as well as induction into the ARIA Hall of Fame. He has also been recognised in the Countdown Music and Video Awards, the Mo Awards, and TV Week magazine's King of Pop Awards and Logie Awards.

In Australia's Bicentennial Year of 1988 Farnham was named 1987 Australian of the Year for "his outstanding contribution to the Australian music industry over 20 years". However, he had not yet been naturalised and so a hastily-organised swearing-in occurred before the honour could be conferred. On Australia Day 1996 Farnham was made an Officer of the Order of Australia "In recognition of service to the Australian music industry and to charitable and community organisations, particularly those relating to youth". On 1 January 2001, as part of Australia's celebration of a centenary of federation, he was awarded a Centenary Medal "for outstanding service to Australian music".

Along with nine other Australian artists, Farnham was declared an Australian Legend of Music by Australia Post in January 2013 and was commemorated with a postage stamp. In 2015, Farnham, AC/DC, Newton-John, the Seekers, and Indigenous Australian musical artist Archie Roach were inducted into the Music Victoria Hall of Fame.

Farnham is the subject of a biographical documentary film, John Farnham: Finding the Voice, directed by Poppy Stockell and shown in cinemas in May 2023. Australian rock music historian Ian McFarlane has described Farnham as "the most successful solo artist in the history of Australian rock and pop... [He] has retained an affable sense of humour and a simple, unpretentious 'everyman' charm which also makes him one of the most respected celebrities in Australian entertainment history".

== Personal life ==
Farnham met dancer Jillian Billman in September 1971 while both were performing in the stage musical Charlie Girl. In a February 1973 edition of Go-Set, Ian Meldrum announced their wedding plans after having received an invitation for March. Farnham's then-manager Darryl Sambell was against Farnham marrying Billman, and despite being best man publicly denied the early reports of the marriage while convincing the couple to delay their nuptials. Nevertheless, Farnham wed Billman on 18 April 1973, co-writing "Jillie's Song" as the B-side of his 1981 single "Too Much Too Soon". The couple have two sons, Robert and James, and live in Wonga Park, Victoria. Farnham is a supporter of the North Melbourne Football Club in the Australian Football League.

Glenn Wheatley, Farnham's manager since 1980, died on 1 February 2022 at the age of 74 from complications of COVID-19. Over the years the pair and their respective families had become close friends, with Farnham declaring that "With his passing so many people have lost a part of their lives". Wheatley's widow Gaynor Wheatley became Farnham's manager.

In his memoir The Voice Inside (2024), Farnham alleged that Sambell had routinely drugged him without his knowledge by slipping amphetamines and sleeping pills into beverages, and was frequently "sexually aggressive" with unwanted advances.

== Health ==
After years of performing in loud-volume concerts, Farnham developed tinnitus and profound hearing loss and has worn hearing aids since 2011. In 2019 he cancelled an Australian and New Zealand tour due to a severe kidney infection and dehydration, subsequently reducing his alcohol intake and giving up his lifetime habit of smoking, initially by switching from cigarettes to cigars. By August of that year he was able to return to performing in Australia and New Zealand.

On 23 August 2022 Farnham issued a statement that he was to undergo immediate surgery after being diagnosed with cancer, stating "cancer diagnosis is something that so many people face every single day, and countless others have walked this path before me". He underwent a nearly twelve-hour surgery the same day to remove a tumour in his mouth, including jaw reconstruction. It was later announced that the tumour had been successfully removed, but his public appearances became sporadic thereafter and in March 2023 he was hospitalised due to a respiratory infection.

On 23 August 2023 Farnham released a statement saying he was cancer-free. In an interview with Variety Australia (September 2023) Farnham's sons were asked if he would ever tour again or release new material and said, "Anything's possible... I think he'd like to, and he can definitely still sing". However, in May 2026 Farnham issued a statement that he will never sing publicly again: "Because of the surgeries to my mouth and face over the past few years, singing on stage is not something I can consider again. It's just not possible. We can rule that out".

In September 2026 his family released a statement that "[Farnham]'s health has deteriorated in recent months. He now requires continuous oxygen support and uses a wheelchair for mobility", and he has 24-hour nursing at home.

== Celebration of his life ==
On 20 September 2026, 120 local and international artists and musicians gathered at Rod Laver Arena to present The Songs of John Farnham: A Living Legend, a tribute concert to Farnham and his music. Farnham was unable to attend due to poor health and was represented by his son Rob. Performers in Melbourne included Tina Arena, Jimmy Barnes, Jack Jones, Richard Marx, Human Nature, and Keith Urban, while Celine Dion and Hugh Jackman appeared by satellite. Also on satellite was Coldplay's Chris Martin, who offered up a new song, which he wrote honouring Farnham, "A Better Singer Than Me". Some of the proceeds will benefit the charity Head & Neck Cancer Australia.

A stage dramatisation of Farnham's life between 1980 and 1986, Whispering Jack: The John Farnham Musical was developed. Written by Jack Yabsley, directed by Mitchell Butel and co-produced by Michael Cassel and Gaynor Wheatley for the Sydney Theatre Company, its opening run was on 15 November 2026 to 3 January 2027 at Roslyn Packer Theatre, Sydney. Australian singer-songwriter Michael Paynter portrayed Farnham.

== Discography ==
- Sadie (1968)
- Everybody Oughta Sing a Song (1968)
- Looking Through a Tear (1970)
- Christmas Is... Johnny Farnham (1970)
- Johnny (1971)
- Together (with Allison Durbin) (1971)
- Johnny Farnham Sings the Shows (1972)
- Hits Magic & Rock 'N Roll (1973)
- Johnny Farnham Sings Hits from the Movies (1974)
- J.P. Farnham Sings (1975)
- Uncovered (1980)
- Whispering Jack (1986)
- Age of Reason (1988)
- Chain Reaction (1990)
- Then Again... (1993)
- Romeo's Heart (1996)
- 33⅓ (2000)
- The Last Time (2002)
- I Remember When I Was Young (2005)
- Jack (2010)
- Friends for Christmas (with Olivia Newton-John) (2016)
