= Sadie (The Cleaning Lady) =

Single by Johnny Farnham

from the album Sadie
- A-side: "Sadie (The Cleaning Lady)"
- B-side: "In My Room"
- Released: November 1967
- Recorded: 1967
- Genre: Pop
- Length: 3:13
- Label: EMI, Columbia
- Songwriters: Ray Gilmore, Johnny Madara, Dave White
- Producer: David Mackay

Johnny Farnham singles chronology
"Sadie (The Cleaning Lady)" (1967)	"Friday Kind of Monday" / "Underneath the Arches" (1968)

"Sadie (The Cleaning Lady)" was Australian pop singer Johnny Farnham's first solo single. The novelty song was released in November 1967 and was No. 1 on the Go-Set National Singles Charts for five weeks in early 1968 (six weeks on the Australian charts in 1968 based on the Kent Music Report). It was the largest-selling single in Australia by an Australian artist in the 1960s.

"Sadie" sold approximately 183,000 copies in Australia and was the highest-selling Australian single until "Up There Cazaly" was released in 1979. It was also released in New Zealand, Denmark and Germany. The B-side, "In My Room", was written by Farnham. The A-side's label includes the acknowledgement "Vacuum cleaner solo: Mr. Jolly". (Note: An in-joke; "Mr Jolly" was the generic name for their door-to-door salesmen in Electrolux advertisements.)

== Background ==
Farnham's manager, Darryl Sambell, had disliked "Sadie (The Cleaning Lady)" because the lyrics were so persistent. However, EMI's in-house producer David Mackay insisted, so the single was released in November 1967. The song was written by United States writers Ray Gilmore, Johnny Madara and Dave White. Sambell approached the Australian Broadcasting Corporation (ABC) TV program This Day Tonight to do a "day in the life of" segment where they followed Farnham around to radio studios to promote the single. Sambell also arranged for the electrical appliance store Godfreys to supply a vacuum cleaner salesman, a Mr Jolly, to be on hand.

By arrangement with Sambell, Melbourne radio DJ Stan Rofe pretended that he disliked "Sadie" before playing it. Rofe continued the ploy on TV's Uptight and viewers responded with calls to play the song. Rofe was also a writer for Go-Set, a teen-oriented pop magazine. Another writer for the magazine, Molly Meldrum, praised Farnham's efforts. "Sadie" hit No. 1 on the Go-Set National Singles Charts in January 1968 and remained there for five weeks. Selling 180,000 copies in Australia, "Sadie" was the highest selling single by an Australian artist of the decade. The B-side, "In My Room", was written by Farnham. The album, Sadie, also produced by Mackay, was released in April.

According to author Jeff Jenkins, another local pop performer, Mike Furber, had the first option on recording "Sadie", but declined. Furber later told Sambell that due to this mistake he was not destined for success.

== Track listing ==
1. "Sadie (The Cleaning Lady) (Ray Gilmore, Johnny Madara, Dave White) – 3:13
2. "In My Room" (Johnny Farnham) – 2:17

== Cover versions ==
- Wolverhampton band Finders Keepers recorded "Sadie, The Cleaning Lady" in mid-1968.
- Swedish singer Siw Malmkvist recorded "Sadie" in English, Swedish (as "Mamma är lik sin mamma" with lyrics translated by Stig Anderson), Danish ("Mor er som hendes mor var") and German ("Frauen sind doch nur Frauen")—all in 1968. The Swedish-language version charted at Svensktoppen for six weeks between 6 October–10 November 1968, topping the chart.
- Finnish singer Katri Helena recorded it in Finnish as "Äiti kuin äidinäiti" in 1968.
- Australian Frankie Davidson parodied it with "Hector the Trash Collector" in 1968.

== Chart positions ==
Year	Singles Chart	Position	Catalogue #
1968	Kent Music Report	1	DO-5032
1968	Go-Set	1	DO-5032
	NZ Listener	2	DNZ.10546
