= Full House (John Farnham album) =

Live album by John Farnham
- Released: 4 November 1991
- Recorded: 1987–1990
- Venues: Melbourne Sports and Entertainment Centre and Flinders Park National Tennis Centre
- Genres: Pop, rock
- Length: 1:08:25
- Labels: Sony BMG, RCA, Wheatley
- Producers: Ross Fraser, John Farnham

John Farnham chronology
| Chain Reaction (1990) | Full House (1991) | Then Again... (1993) |

Singles from Full House
- 1. "Please Don't Ask Me [Live]" Released: November 1991; 2. "Help! [Live]" Released: April 1992 (Germany only); 3. "You're The Voice [Live]" Released: June 1992 (Germany only)

Full House is a live album by Australian singer John Farnham. The album was released in Australia on 4 November 1991, and is the first live album by Farnham since his comeback via the 1986 release of Whispering Jack. It peaked at No.2 on the ARIA Albums Chart.

The album contains live tracks recorded during Farnham's 1987 Whispering Jack Tour, 1989 Age of Reason Tour and the 1990 Chain Reaction Tour. Only one track from this album was released as a single. "Please Don't Ask Me", written by Graeham Goble, of The Little River Band was released in late 1991 and peaked at No. 22 on the ARIA Singles Chart. It had previously been featured on an earlier album Uncovered.

== Track listing ==
1. "When the War Is Over" † (S. Prestwich) – 5:33
2. "Age of Reason" § (T. Hunter, J. Pigott) – 5:35
3. "Don't You Know It's Magic" ‡ (B. Cadd) – 4:18
4. "Two Strong Hearts" ‡ (B. Woolley, A. Hill) – 3:49
5. "Comic Conversations" † (J. Bromley) – 4:05
6. "Help!" ‡ (with Melbourne Symphony Orchestra) (J. Lennon, P. McCartney) – 4:57
7. "Chain Reaction" § (D. Stewart, S. Stewart) – 3:42
8. "Burn for You" § (P. Buckle, J. Farnham, R. Faser) – 4:20
9. "Reasons" § (S. See) – 4:25
10. "You're the Voice" † (with The Australian Children's Choir) (M. Ryder, C. Thompson, A. Qunta, K. Reid) – 5:17
11. "A Touch of Paradise" ‡ (with Ross Wilson) (R. Wilson, G. Smith) – 4:42
12. "That's Freedom"§ (T. Kimmel, J. Chapman) – 4:37
13. "One" ‡ (with Melbourne Symphony Orchestra) (H. Nilsson) – 3:04
14. "Playing to Win" ‡ (with Melbourne Symphony Orchestra) (G. Goble, J. Farnham, D. Hirschfelder, S. Housden, S. Proffer, W. Nelson, S. Prestwich) – 3:07
15. "Pressure Down" † (H. Bogdanovs) – 3:37
16. "Please Don't Ask Me" ‡(with Melbourne Symphony Orchestra) (G. Goble) – 3:29

Notes:
† - Recorded at the Melbourne Sports and Entertainment Centre, March 1987, during the Whispering Jack Tour
‡ - Recorded at the Flinders Park National Tennis Centre, Melbourne, December 1988, during the Age of Reason Tour
§ - Recorded at the Flinders Park National Tennis Centre, Melbourne, December 1990, during the Chain Reaction Tour

== Charts ==
| Chart (1991/92) | Peak position |
|---|---|
| Australian Albums (ARIA) | 2 |
| New Zealand Albums (RMNZ) | 16 |
| Norwegian Albums (VG-lista) | 11 |

== Certifications ==
| Region | Certification | Certified units/sales |
|---|---|---|
| Australia (ARIA) | 5× Platinum | 350,000^{^} |
^{^} Shipments figures based on certification alone.
