= One Voice: Greatest Hits =

One Voice: The Greatest Hits

Greatest hits album by John Farnham
- Released: 20 October 2003 (Australia)
- Recorded: 1967–2003
- Genres: Synthpop, pop, rock
- Length: 1:50:49
- Labels: Sony BMG, RCA, Gotham
- Producers: Ross Fraser, John Farnham

John Farnham chronology
An Audience with John Farnham (2003)	One Voice: The Greatest Hits (2003)	One Voice: The Greatest Clips (2003)

Singles from One Voice: The Greatest Hits
- 1. "We Will Rock You" Released: October 2003

One Voice: The Greatest Hits is a 2 disc greatest hits compilation album by Australian singer John Farnham. The album was released in Australia on 20 October 2003, and was accompanied by a DVD of music videos titled One Voice: The Greatest Clips. It was released to celebrate 35 years of John Farnham's career.

This album and subsequent DVD were released by Sony BMG to celebrate 35 years of John Farnham's music being commercially available in Australia. The album reached No. 2 in the ARIA charts.

The compilation is an updated version of his 1997 hits package Anthology 1 with some newer tracks and notable pre-1986 singles added.

== Track listing ==
Disc 1

1. "We Will Rock You" (Brian May) – 3:06
2. "That's Freedom" (T. Kimmel, J. Chapman) – 4:16
3. "Age of Reason" (T. Hunter, J. Pigott) – 5:06
4. "Pressure Down" (H. Bogdanovs) – 3:44
5. "Don't You Know It's Magic" (B. Cadd) – 4:01
6. "A Touch of Paradise" (R. Wilson, G. Smith) – 4:44
7. "Help!" (John Lennon, Paul McCartney) – 4:23
8. "When Something Is Wrong with My Baby" Feat. Jimmy Barnes (Isaac Hayes, David Porter) – 4:52
9. "Chain Reaction" (D. Stewart, S. Stewart) – 3:11
10. "Raindrops Keep Falling on My Head" (Hal David, Burt Bacharach) – 2:30
11. "Sadie (The Cleaning Lady)" (Ray Gilmore, Johnny Madara, Dave White) – 3:16
12. "A Simple Life" (J. Lind, R. Page) – 3:50
13. "Burn for You" (P. Buckle, J. Farnham, R. Faser) – 3:32
14. "The Last Time" (Mick Jagger, Keith Richards) – 3:26

Disc 2

1. "You're The Voice" (M. Ryder, C. Thompson, A. Qunta, K. Reid) – 5:02
2. "Two Strong Hearts" (B. Woolley, A. Hill) – 3:30
3. "Everything's Alright" Feat. Kate Ceberano and Jon Stevens (Andrew Lloyd Webber, Tim Rice) – 4:47
4. "One" (Harry Nilsson) – 2:49
5. "Seemed Like A Good Idea (At The Time)" (1997 edit) (R. Wilson, J. Farnham, R. Fraser) – 3:45
6. "Talk of the Town" (S. Howard) – 3:42
7. "Angels" (2003 edit) (T. Kimmel, J. Kimball) – 5:35
8. "Have a Little Faith (In Us)" (1997 edit) (R. Desalvo, A. Roman) – 4:45
9. "Hearts On Fire" (1997 edit) (T. Kimmel, S. Lynch) – 4:16
10. "Everytime You Cry" Feat. Human Nature (S. Peiken, G. Sutton) – 4:43
11. "Reasons" (S. See) – 4:26
12. "No Ordinary World" (L. Andersson, S. Davis) – 3:45
13. "Man of the Hour" (S. Hostin, D. Deviller, S. Kipner) – 4:01

== Charts ==
=== Weekly charts ===
Chart (2003–06)	Peak position
Australian Albums (ARIA)	2
New Zealand Albums (RMNZ)	29

=== Year-end charts ===
Chart (2003)	Position
Australian Albums (ARIA)	13
Chart (2004)	Position
Australian Albums (ARIA)	57

=== Decade-end chart ===
Chart (2000–2009)	Position
Australian Albums (ARIA)	55

== Certifications ==
Region	Certification	Certified units/sales
Australia (ARIA)	4× Platinum	280,000^{‡}
^{‡} Sales+streaming figures based on certification alone.
