= List of awards and nominations received by John Farnham =

John Farnham awards and nominations
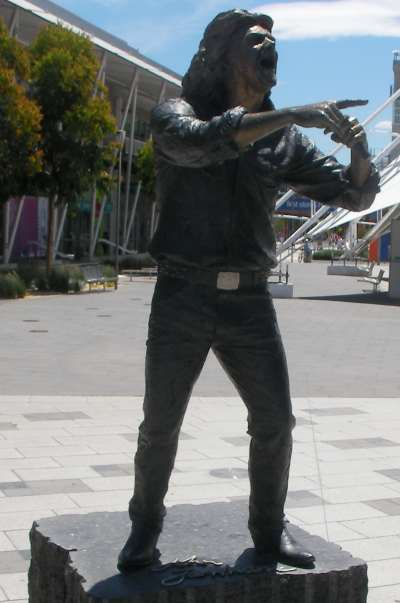
- Statue of John Farnham, Melbourne Docklands
Awards and nominations
| Award | Wins | Nominations |
| ARIA Awards | 21 | 60 |
| Countdown Music and Video Awards | 4 | 4 |
| King of Pop Awards | 8 | 8 |
| Logie Awards | 10 | 10 |
| Mo Awards Entertainment industry awards | 14 | 14 |

Totals (Note: Certain award groups do not simply award one winner. They acknowledge several different recipients, have runners-up, and have third place. Since this is a specific recognition and is different from losing an award, runner-up mentions are considered wins in this award tally. For simplification and to avoid errors, each award in this list has been presumed to have had a prior nomination.)
- Wins: 57
- Nominations: 96

John Farnham is an Australian pop singer who has won and been nominated for Australian music and entertainment awards, including Australian Recording Industry Association (ARIA) Awards, Countdown Music and Video Awards, and King of Pop Awards. He was inducted into the ARIA Hall of Fame in 2003.

== ARIA Awards ==
Farnham has won 22 Australian Recording Industry Association (ARIA) Awards including his 2003 induction into the Hall of Fame. This induction recognised his achievement of a "significant body of recorded work" and that he "had a cultural impact within Australia". Farnham has won 21 other ARIA Awards, from a total of 65 nominations, including winning five for Highest Selling Album in 1987, 1989, 1991, 1994 and 1999; and four for Best Adult Contemporary Album in 1987, 1988, 1996 and 2003. 1987 was his most successful year when he won six awards from ten nominations.

| Year | Nominee / work | Award | Result |
|---|---|---|---|
| 1987 | "You're the Voice" | Highest Selling Single | Won |
| 1987 | "You're the Voice" | Single of the Year | Won |
| 1987 | Whispering Jack | Best Adult Contemporary Album | Won |
| 1987 | Whispering Jack | Highest Selling Album | Won |
| 1987 | Whispering Jack | Album of the Year | Won |
| 1987 | Whispering Jack | Best Male Artist | Won |
| 1987 | Whispering Jack – Ross Fraser | Producer of the Year | Nominated |
| 1987 | Whispering Jack – Doug Brady | Engineer of the Year | Nominated |
| 1987 | Whispering Jack – Steve Malpass | Best Cover Artist | Nominated |
| 1987 | "No One Comes Close" – Eric McCusker | Best Songwriter | Nominated |
| 1988 | John Farnham | Outstanding Achievement Award | Won |
| 1988 | John Farnham | Best Male Artist | Won |
| 1988 | "Touch of Paradise" | Best Adult Contemporary Album | Won |
| 1989 | Age of Reason | Highest Selling Album | Won |
| 1989 | Age of Reason | Album of the Year | Nominated |
| 1989 | Age of Reason | Best Male Artist | Nominated |
| 1989 | Age of Reason | Best Adult Contemporary Album | Nominated |
| 1989 | Age of Reason – Ross Fraser | Producer of the Year | Won |
| 1989 | Age of Reason – Malpass & Burrows | Best Cover Art | Nominated |
| 1989 | "Age of Reason" | Single of the Year | Nominated |
| 1989 | "Age of Reason" | Highest Selling Single | Nominated |
| 1989 | "Age of Reason" | Song of the Year | Nominated |
| 1989 | "Age of Reason" – Stephen Priest & Steve Hopkins | Best Video | Nominated |
| 1989 | Age of Reason | Engineer of the Year | Won |
| 1990 | "Communication (with Dani'Elle)" - Doug Brady | Engineer of the Year | Nominated |
| 1991 | Chain Reaction | Highest Selling Album | Won |
| 1991 | Chain Reaction | Album of the Year | Nominated |
| 1991 | Chain Reaction | Best Male Artist | Won |
| 1991 | "That's Freedom" | Single of the Year | Nominated |
| 1991 | "That's Freedom" | Best Video | Nominated |
| 1991 | "Burn for You" | Song of the Year | Won |
| 1991 | "That's Freedom" - Ross Fraser | Producer of the Year | Won |
| 1991 | "Burn for You", "That's Freedom" - Doug Brady | Engineer of the Year | Nominated |
| 1991 | Chain Reaction - Jon Quinn | Best Cover Art | Nominated |
| 1992 | Full House | Best Male Artist | Nominated |
| 1992 | Full House | Highest Selling Album | Nominated |
| 1992 | "When Something Is Wrong with My Baby (with Jimmy Barnes)" | Single of the Year | Nominated |
| 1992 | "When Something Is Wrong with My Baby (with Jimmy Barnes)" | Highest Selling Single | Nominated |
| 1992 | "In Days to Come", "That's Freedom" - Ross Fraser | Producer of the Year | Nominated |
| 1994 | "Seemed Like a Good Idea (At the Time)" (Note: The video for "Seemed Like a Good Idea (At the Time)" was directed by Craig Griffin.) | Best Video | Nominated |
| 1994 | Then Again | Best Male Artist | Nominated |
| 1994 | Then Again | Highest Selling Album | Won |
| 1994 | Then Again | Album of the Year | Nominated |
| 1996 | Romeo's Heart (Note: The album Romeo's Heart was engineered by Doug Brady.) | Album of the Year | Nominated |
| 1996 | Romeo's Heart | Best Male Artist | Nominated |
| 1996 | Romeo's Heart | Best Adult Contemporary Album | Won |
| 1996 | Romeo's Heart | Engineer of the Year | Nominated |
| 1997 | Romeo's Heart | Highest Selling Album | Nominated |
| 1997 | "All Kinds of People" | Best Video | Nominated |
| 1997 | "Heart's on Fire" (Note: The song "Heart's on Fire" was engineered by Doug Brady.) | Engineer of the Year | Nominated |
| 1998 | Anthology 1 | Highest Selling Album | Nominated |
| 1998 | "Every Time You Cry (with Human Nature)" | Highest Selling Single | Nominated |
| 1999 | Highlights from The Main Event (with Olivia Newton-John & Anthony Warlow) | Highest Selling Album | Won |
| 1999 | Highlights from The Main Event (with Olivia Newton-John & Anthony Warlow) | Best Adult Contemporary Album | Nominated |
| 2000 | Live at the Regent (Note: The album Live at the Regent was engineered by Doug Brady.) | Best Original Cast / Show Recording | Nominated |
| 2000 | Live at the Regent | Engineer of the Year | Won |
| 2001 | 33 1/3 (Note: The album 33 1/3 was engineered by Doug Brady.) | Highest Selling Album | Nominated |
| 2001 | 33 1/3 | Best Adult Contemporary Album | Nominated |
| 2001 | 33 1/3 | Engineer of the Year | Nominated |
| 2003 | The Last Time | Highest Selling Album | Nominated |
| 2003 | The Last Time | Best Adult Contemporary Album | Won |
| 2003 | The Last Time | Hall of Fame | Inducted |
| 2005 | Together in Concert (with Tom Jones) | Best Adult Contemporary Album | Nominated |
| 2011 | Jack | Best Adult Contemporary Album | Nominated |
| 2015 | Two Strong Hearts Live (with Olivia Newton-John) | Best Adult Contemporary Album | Nominated |

== Countdown Awards ==
Countdown was an Australian pop music TV series on national broadcaster ABC-TV from 1974 to 1987, it presented music awards from 1979 to 1987, initially in conjunction with magazine TV Week but then independently. TV Week had previously sponsored the 'King of Pop' awards. The Countdown Music and Video Awards were succeeded by the ARIA Awards. The 1986 awards ceremony was held on 19 July 1987 at Sydney Opera House, it followed the last regular Countdown show.

| Year | Nominee / work | Award | Result |
|---|---|---|---|
| 1986 | Whispering Jack | Best Album | Won |
| 1986 | "You're the Voice" | Best Single | Won |
| 1986 | "You're the Voice" | Best Performance in a Video | Won |
| 1986 | "You're the Voice" | Best Video | Nominated |
| 1986 | John Farnham | Outstanding Achievement | Won |

== Go-Set Pop Poll ==
The Go-Set Pop Poll was coordinated by teen-oriented pop music newspaper, Go-Set and was established in February 1966 and conducted an annual poll during 1966 to 1972 of its readers to determine the most popular personalities.

| Year | Nominee / work | Award | Result |
|---|---|---|---|
| 1968 | himself | Top Male Singer | 2nd |
| 1969 | himself | Male Vocal | 2nd |
| 1970 | himself | Best Male | 1st |
| 1971 | himself | Best Male | 1st |
| 1971 | Looking Through a Tear | Best Album | 7th |
| 1971 | "Acapulco Sun" | Best Single | 8th |
| 1972 | himself | Male Vocal | 1st |
| 1972 | Johnny Farnham Sings the Shows | Best Album | 3rd |
| 1972 | Together | Best Album | 10th |
| 1972 | "Rock Me Baby" | Best Single | 4th |
| 1972 | "Walking the Floor with My Hands" | Best Single | 5th |

== Helpmann Awards ==
The Helpmann Awards are an accolade, presented by Live Performance Australia (LPA), for achievements in disciplines of Australia's live performance sectors, including theatre, musicals, opera, ballet, dance and concerts. In 2004, Farnham received the JC Williamson Award, the LPA's highest honour, for his life's work in live performance.

| Year | Nominee / work | Award | Result |
|---|---|---|---|
| 2004 | Himself | JC Williamson Award | awarded |

== King of Pop Awards ==
Teen-oriented pop music magazine, Go-Set was established in February 1966 and conducted an annual poll of its readers to determine the most popular personalities. In 1967 the most popular performer was Normie Rowe and when the awards were announced on the Go!! television show there was a crowning of Rowe as 'King of Pop'. In the following years, TV Week provided coupons for readers to vote for their choice, a similar system had been in use for TV's Logie Awards since 1960. The 'King of Pop' awards ceremony was televised by the 0–10 Network from 1967 to 1975, and from 1976 to 1978 by the Nine Network. As Johnny Farnham, he was crowned 'King of Pop' for five consecutive years, 1969–1973 and won three other awards.

| Year | Nominee / work | Award | Result |
|---|---|---|---|
| 1969 | Johnny Farnham | King of Pop | Won |
| 1970 | Johnny Farnham | King of Pop | Won |
| 1971 | Johnny Farnham | King of Pop | Won |
| 1971 | Johnny Farnham | Best Dressed Male Performer | Won |
| 1972 | Johnny Farnham | King of Pop | Won |
| 1972 | "Walking the Floor" | Most Popular Australian Single | Won |
| 1973 | Johnny Farnham | King of Pop | Won |
| 1973 | Hits 1: Magic Rock 'N' Roll | Most Popular Australian Album | Won |

== Logie Awards ==
Television guide TV Week developed a set of awards in 1958 which became the Logie Awards, the magazine provided coupons for readers to vote for their choice in a variety of categories from 1960. As Johnny Farnham, he was voted "Best Teenage Personality" on television for five years in a row, during 1969–1973 and received five more Logies as John Farnham for "Most Popular Music Video" during the late 1980s and early 1990s.

| Year | Nominee / work | Award | Result |
|---|---|---|---|
| 1969 | Johnny Farnham | Best Teenage Personality | Won |
| 1970 | Johnny Farnham | Best Teenage Personality | Won |
| 1971 | Johnny Farnham | Best Teenage Personality | Won |
| 1972 | Johnny Farnham | Best Teenage Personality | Won |
| 1973 | Johnny Farnham | Best Teenage Personality | Won |
| 1987 | "You're the Voice" (Note: The video for "You're the Voice" was directed by Meiert Avis.) | Most Popular Music Video | Won |
| 1989 | "Age of Reason" (Note: The video for "Age of Reason" was directed by .) | Most Popular Music Video | Won |
| 1991 | "Chain Reaction" (Note: The video for "Chain Reaction" was directed by .) | Most Popular Music Video | Won |
| 1992 | "When Something Is Wrong with My Baby" (Note: "When Something Is Wrong with My Baby" was performed by Farnham and Jimmy Barnes who shared the award. The video was directed by .) | Most Popular Music Video | Won |
| 1993 | "Everything's Alright" (Note: "Everything's Alright" was performed by Farnham, Kate Ceberano and Jon Stevens who shared the award. The video was directed by .) | Most Popular Music Video | Won |

== Mo Awards ==
The Mo Awards are Australia's entertainment industry awards, which began in 1975, as the New South Wales Star Awards, when they become a national awards program in the next year, Don Lane proposed the name, Mo Awards, in honor of Australian entertainer Roy "Mo McCackie" Rene. Award categories are reviewed annually and adapted to changing trends. Farnham has won "Male Vocal" or "Male Vocal Performer" on seven occasions from 14 award wins.

| Year | Nominee / work | Award | Result |
|---|---|---|---|
| 1978 | Johnny Farnham | Male Vocal | Won |
| 1979 | Johnny Farnham | Male Vocal | Won |
| 1980 | John Farnham | Male Vocal | Won |
| 1980 | John Farnham | Entertainer of the Year | Won |
| 1981 | John Farnham | Male Vocal | Won |
| 1982 | John Farnham | Male Vocal | Won |
| 1986 | John Farnham | Entertainer of the Year | Won |
| 1987 | John Farnham | Daily Telegraph — Male | Won |
| 1987 | John Farnham | Male Vocal Performer | Won |
| 1988 | John Farnham | Daily Telegraph — Male | Won |
| 1988 | John Farnham | Male Vocal Performer | Won |
| 1991 | John Farnham | Contemporary Concert Performer of the Year | Won |
| 1999 | Main Event (Anthony Warlow, John Farnham, Olivia Newton-John) | Australian Performer of the Year | Won |
| 2000 | John Farnham | Arena Performer of the Year | Won |

== Music Victoria Awards ==
The Music Victoria Awards are an annual awards night celebrating Victorian music. They commenced in 2005.

| Year | Nominee / work | Award | Result |
|---|---|---|---|
| 2015 | John Farnham | Hall of Fame | inductee |
