= One Voice: The Greatest Clips =

Video by John Farnham
- Released: 20 October 2003 (Australia)
- Recorded: 1967–2003
- Genres: Pop, rock
- Length: 2:42:38
- Labels: Sony BMG, RCA, Gotham
- Director: Various
- Producers: Ross Fraser, John Farnham

John Farnham chronology
One Voice: The Greatest Hits (2003)	One Voice: The Greatest Clips (2003)	John Farnham & Tom Jones – Together in Concert (2005)

One Voice: The Greatest Clips is a DVD release by Australian singer John Farnham. The DVD was released in Australia on 20 October 2003 in conjunction with a 2 disc greatest hits compilation titled, One Voice: The Greatest Hits. This DVD contains all of John Farnham's music videos and clips from 1966 to 2003.

== DVD track listing ==
1. "You're The Voice" – 5:06
2. "Pressure Down" – 5:01
3. "A Touch of Paradise" – 4:40
4. "Two Strong Hearts" – 3:42
5. "Age Of Reason" – 5:10
6. "That's Freedom" – 4:23
7. "Chain Reaction" – 4:02
8. "Burn for You" – 3:35
9. "Seemed Like a Good Idea (At the Time)" – 5:33
10. "Talk of the Town" – 3:40<
11. "Angels" Music Video – 4:55
12. "Have a Little Faith (In Us)" – 4:43
13. "A Simple Life" – 3:36
14. "Heart's On Fire" – 4:12<
15. "When Something Is Wrong with My Baby" (with Jimmy Barnes) – 5:01
16. "Everytime You Cry" (with Human Nature) – 4:06
17. "Please Don't Ask Me" – 3:26
18. "All Kinds Of People" – 4:09
19. "Trying to Live My Life Without You" – 3:43
20. "Man of the Hour" – 4:24
21. "Don't Let It End" – 4:43
22. "Beyond the Call" – 4:40
23. "Sadie (The Cleaning Lady)" – 3:13
24. "One" – 2:44
25. "Help!" – 4:23
26. "Communication" (with Danni'elle) – 4:1
27. "In Days to Come" – 4:03
28. "No Ordinary World" – 3:30
29. "Only Women Bleed" – 4:20
30. From the Vault (Bonus Track) – 17:20
31. 50th Birthday Concert Opener (Bonus Track) – 4:06
32. Behind The Reason: The Making of John Farnham's Age of Reason (Bonus Track) – 12:25
33. The Last Time Launch Presentation (Bonus Track) – 3:33

== Charts ==
=== Weekly charts ===
Chart (2003-2009)	Peak position
Australia DVD (ARIA)	2

=== Year-end charts ===
Chart (2003)	Rank
Australia DVD (ARIA)	14
Chart (2004)	Rank
Australia DVD (ARIA)	4

== Certifications ==
Region	Certification	Certified units/sales
Australia (ARIA)	5× Platinum	75,000^{^}
^{^} Shipments figures based on certification alone.
