= Live One (Dragon album) =

Live album by Dragon
- Released: June 1985
- Recorded: 10 August 1984; Sydney Entertainment Centre
- Genres: Rock, pop rock
- Length: 52:55
- Label: PolyGram Records

Dragon chronology
Body and the Beat (1984)	Live One (1985)	Dreams of Ordinary Men (1986)

Live One is the first live album by Australian-New Zealand rock band Dragon. The album was recorded on 10 August 1984 at the Sydney Entertainment Centre during the promotion of the Body and the Beat album. Live One was released in June 1985 and peaked at number 62 on the Australian Kent Music Report.

The album is dedicated to Paul Hewson, who appeared as part of the group on the recording, but who had died in early 1985. The album was also the last new Dragon recording to feature guitarist Robert Taylor, bookending Taylor's ten-year membership of the group. It also spelt the end of Terry Chambers' involvement with Dragon.

== Track listing ==
Side One

1. "Wilderworld" (Johanna Pigott, Marc Hunter, Todd Hunter) – 4:00
2. "Magic" (M. Hunter, Robert Taylor) – 3:53
3. "Still in Love with You" (Paul Hewson) – 3:14
4. "Body and the Beat" (M. Hunter, R. Taylor) – 4:45
5. "Witnessing" (M. Hunter, T. Hunter) – 4:49
6. "Promises" (J. Pigott, M. Hunter, T. Hunter) – 5:37

Side Two

1. "Cry" (T. Hunter) – 4:23
2. "April Sun in Cuba" (M. Hunter, P. Hewson) – 6:51
3. "Are You Old Enough?" (P. Hewson) – 5:35
4. "Rain" (J. Pigott, M. Hunter, T. Hunter) – 5:56

== Charts ==
Chart (1985)	Peak position
Australian Albums (Kent Music Report)	62

== Personnel ==
- Terry Chambers – drums
- Robert Taylor – guitar, vocals
- Alan Mansfield – keyboards, guitar, vocals, remix
- Paul Hewson – keyboards, vocals
- Marc Hunter – lead vocals
- Todd Hunter – vocals, bass, remix

Production

- Recorded by Ernie Rose
- Remixed by Steve Bywaters
