= Body and the Beat =

Studio album by Dragon
- Released: June 1984
- Genre: Rock
- Length: 38:02
- Label: Polydor
- Producer: Alan Mansfield, Carey Taylor

Dragon chronology
Are You Old Enough (1983)	Body and the Beat (1984)	Live One (1985)

Singles from Body and the Beat
- 1. "Rain" Released: July 1983; 2. "Magic" Released: November 1983; 3. "Cry" Released: May 1984; 4. "Wilderworld" Released: July 1984; 5. "Body and the Beat" Released: October 1984

Body and the Beat is the seventh studio album recorded by Australian-New Zealand rock band, Dragon. The album was released in June 1984 and peaked at number 5 on the Australian Kent Music Report. The album was certified gold in the week of release and achieved platinum status in Australia. It was the band's first studio album since Power Play in 1979.

Although Dragon had reformed with the "classic" 1970s line-up which had produced the group's biggest hits of the previous decade, this album saw some line-up changes: the addition of second keyboard player Alan Mansfield and the substitution of Terry Chambers for Kerry Jacobson. Paul Hewson, who had been responsible for many of the band's hits, was unwilling or unable to contribute extensively to songwriting, and instead Todd Hunter, who had always contributed to Dragon's repertoire but had not been key to its chart success, contributed the majority of the album's hits with his partner Johanna Pigott. Between the demise and revival of Dragon, Pigott and Hunter had been members of, and songwriting contributors to, the group XL Capris. Robert Taylor's song "Magic" was also released as a single from the album, Taylor's third single A-side with the group after the much earlier "Education" (1975) and "Wait Until Tomorrow" (1976).

At the 1984 Countdown Music Awards, Body and the Beat was nominated for Best Australian Album.

== Track listing ==
Side one

1. "Rain" (Johanna Pigott, Marc Hunter, Todd Hunter) – 3:39
2. "Promises" (Johanna Pigott, Marc Hunter, Todd Hunter) – 4:11
3. "Wilderworld" (Johanna Pigott, Marc Hunter, Todd Hunter) – 3:51
4. "Cry" (Todd Hunter) – 3:44
5. "Cool Down" (Alan Mansfield, Todd Hunter) – 4:21

Side two

1. "Body and the Beat" (Marc Hunter, Robert Taylor) – 4:26
2. "Witnessing" (Marc Hunter, Todd Hunter) – 4:39
3. "Magic" (Robert Taylor) – 3:57
4. "What Am I Gonna Do?" (Alan Mansfield, Kerry Jacobson, Robert Taylor, Paul Hewson, Todd Hunter) – 3:41
5. "Fool" (Johanna Pigott, Todd Hunter) – 3:31

== Personnel ==
- Robert Taylor – guitar, vocals
- Alan Mansfield – keyboards, guitar, vocals
- Paul Hewson – keyboards, vocals
- Marc Hunter – lead vocals
- Terry Chambers – drums
- Todd Hunter – bass guitar, vocals

uncredited:

- Kerry Jacobson – drums on "Rain"

Production

- Produced by Alan Mansfield (tracks 1 and 8) and Carey Taylor (tracks 2–7, 9, 10)

== Charts ==
Chart performance for Body and the Beat
Chart (1984)	Peak position
Australian Albums (Kent Music Report)	5

== Certifications ==
Certifications for Body and the Beat
Region	Certification	Certified units/sales
Australia (ARIA)	Platinum	70,000^{^}
^{^} Shipments figures based on certification alone.
