= John Farnham & Tom Jones – Together in Concert =

2005 live album

John Farnham & Tom Jones - Together In Concert

Live album by John Farnham and Tom Jones
- Released: 31 May 2005
- Recorded: February 2005
- Genres: Pop, rock
- Length: 49:08
- Label: Sony BMG
- Producer: Ross Fraser

John Farnham chronology
| One Voice: The Greatest Clips (2003) | John Farnham & Tom Jones - Together In Concert (2005) | I Remember When I Was Young (2005) |

Tom Jones chronology
| Tom Jones and Jools Holland (2004) | John Farnham & Tom Jones (2005) |

John Farnham and Tom Jones – Together in Concert is an Australian tour featuring John Farnham and Tom Jones performing together for ten concerts throughout the capital cities of Perth, Sydney, Brisbane, and Melbourne. Jones sings his major hits, before Farnham performs his set including hits "One", "Pressure Down", "That's Freedom", "Heart's on Fire", "Playing to Win", "Everytime You Cry", "Man of the Hour", "Age of Reason" and "Burn for You". The pair then return to the stage together to perform four duets of soul classics: Sam and Dave's "Hold On I'm Coming", Otis Redding's "Try a Little Tenderness", Ray Charles's "What'd I Say", Arthur Conley's "Sweet Soul Music" and AC/DC's "It's a Long Way to the Top (If You Wanna Rock 'n' Roll)".

On 31 May 2005, a CD album and DVD video were released from a show at the Rod Laver Arena at Melbourne Park. The DVD release debuted at number 1 on the Australian charts, with the album reaching number 3, and being awarded as 3× platinum.

== Track listing ==
1. "Mama Told Me Not to Come" (Randy Newman) – 3:21
2. "200 Pounds of Heavenly Joy" (Willie Dixon) – 3:04
3. "Man of the Hour" (Sean Hosein, Dane DeViller, Steve Kipner) – 4:25
4. "What Am I Living For" (Art Harris, Fred Jay) – 2:41
5. "It's Not Unusual" (Gordon Mills, Les Reed) – 2:34
6. "Burn for You" (Phil Buckle, John Farnham, Ross Fraser) – 4:22
7. "Playing to Win" (Graeham Goble, John Farnham, David Hirschfelder, Stephen Housden, Spencer Proffer, Wayne Nelson, Steven Prestwich) – 3:06
8. "My Yiddishe Momme" (Lew Pollack, Jack Yellen) – 2:29
9. "You're the Voice" (Maggie Ryder, Chris Thompson, Andy Qunta, Keith Reid) – 4:39
10. "That Driving Beat" (Willie Mitchell) – 3:04
11. "Hold On, I'm Coming" (Isaac Hayes, David Porter) – 3:17
12. "Try a Little Tenderness" (Harry M. Woods, James Campbell, Reginald Connelly) – 4:03
13. "What'd I Say" (Ray Charles) – 4:42
14. "Sweet Soul Music" (Sam Cooke, Otis Redding, Arthur Conley) – 3:26
15. "It's a Long Way to the Top (If You Wanna Rock 'n' Roll)" (Malcolm Young, Angus Young, Bon Scott) – 5:34

== Charts ==
=== Weekly charts ===
Weekly chart performance for John Farnham & Tom Jones – Together in Concert
| Chart (2005) | Peak position |
|---|---|
| Australian Albums (ARIA) | 3 |
| Australian DVD (ARIA) | 1 |

=== Year-end charts ===
2005 year-end chart performance for John Farnham & Tom Jones – Together in Concert
| Chart (2005) | Position |
|---|---|
| Australian Albums (ARIA) | 47 |
| Australian DVD (ARIA) | 3 |

2006 year-end chart performance for John Farnham & Tom Jones – Together in Concert
| Chart (2006) | Position |
|---|---|
| Australian DVD (ARIA) | 31 |

== Certifications ==
Certifications for John Farnham & Tom Jones – Together in Concert
| Region | Certification | Certified units/sales |
|---|---|---|
| Australia (ARIA) album | Platinum | 70,000^{^} |
| Australia (ARIA) DVD | 5× Platinum | 75,000^{^} |
^{^} Shipments figures based on certification alone.
