= APRA Music Awards of 1990 =

Annual Australian music awards

- Date: 1990
- Location: Australia
- Website: apra-amcos.com.au

The Australasian Performing Right Association Awards of 1990 (generally known as APRA Awards) are a series of awards held in 1990. The APRA Music Awards were presented by Australasian Performing Right Association (APRA) and the Australasian Mechanical Copyright Owners Society (AMCOS).

== Awards ==
Only winners are noted

Award	Winner
Gold Award	"Devil Inside" (Andrew Farriss, Michael Hutchence) by INXS
Gold Award	"New Sensation" (Farriss, Hutchence) by INXS
Most Performed Australasian Work for Film	Young Einstein (William Motzing, Tommy Tycho) by Martin Armiger, William Motzing, Tommy Tycho
Most Performed Country Work	"A Little Further North Each Year" (Graeme Connors) by Graeme Connors
Most Performed Australasian Popular Work	"Age of Reason" (Johanna Pigott, Todd Hunter) by John Farnham
Most Performed Australasian Serious Work	"Concertino for Oboe & Orchestra" (Colin Brumby) by Colin Brumby
Most Performed Australasian Jazz Work	"Saturday Sailing" (James Morrison and John Morrison) by Morrison Brothers Big Bad Band
Most Performed Overseas Work	"Two Strong Hearts" (Bruce Woolley, Andy Hill) by John Farnham

== See also ==
- Music of Australia
