= Together in Concert =

Together in Concert and similar names may refer to:

- Together in Concert: Live, a 2000 live album by Tim Finn, Bic Runga, and Dave Dobbyn
- John Farnham & Tom Jones – Together in Concert, a 1990s concert tour and 2005 live album
- Together In Concert, a 1975 live album by Arlo Guthrie and Pete Seeger
- Juntos en concierto 2006 (translation: "Together in Concert 2006"), a concert tour by Marc Anthony, Laura Pausini and Marco Antonio Solís
