= Cry (Dragon song) =

Single by Dragon

from the album Body and the Beat
- Released: May 1984
- Genre: Rock
- Length: 3:43
- Label: Polydor Records, Mercury Records
- Songwriter(s): Johanna Pigott, Todd Hunter
- Producer(s): Carey Taylor

Dragon singles chronology
| "Magic" (1983) | "Cry" (1984) | "Wilderworld" (1984) |

"Cry" is a song by the New Zealand-Australian rock band Dragon, released in May 1984 as the third single from the group's seventh studio album Body and the Beat (1984). The song peaked at number 17 on the Australian Kent Music Report.

== Track listing ==
1. Cry (Johanna Pigott, Todd Hunter) - 3:43
2. What Am I Gonna Do? (Alan Mansfield, Kenny Jacobson, Robert Taylor, Paul Hewson, Todd Hunter) - 3:41

== Charts ==
| Chart (1984) | Peak position |
|---|---|
| Australian Kent Music Report | 17 |

== Personnel ==
- Guitar, vocals – Robert Taylor
- Keyboards, guitar, vocals – Alan Mansfield
- Keyboards, vocals – Paul Hewson
- Lead vocals – Marc Hunter
- Percussion – Terry Chambers
- Vocals, bass guitar – Todd Hunter
