= Scribble (band) =

- Origin: Sydney, New South Wales, Australia
- Genres: Post-punk, synth-pop
- Years active: 1983–1987
- Labels: Regular/WEA; Regular/Festival
- Past members: see Members

Scribble were an Australian post-punk synthpop band based around Johanna Pigott (ex-XL Capris) on lead vocals, guitar, piano and keyboards, which she formed in 1983. She was joined by her domestic partner, Todd Hunter (of Dragon, also ex-XL Capris), on bass guitar and keyboards, and session musicians. They released two albums, So Far 1983-1985 (December 1985) and Pop Art (mid-1986). Scribble disbanded in 1987 with Pigott focussing on her song writing.

== History ==
Johanna Pigott formed Scribble as a synth pop band in Sydney in 1983, the year after her previous group, XL Capris had disbanded. For her new group Pigott provided lead vocals, guitar, piano and keyboards. She recruited her domestic partner (later her husband), Todd Hunter, on bass guitar and keyboards. Hunter was also a member of the rock group, Dragon, and had been her bandmate in XL Capris.

In November 1983 the group issued a seven-track extended play, Scribble, on Regular/WEA. Session musicians with Pigott and Hunter were Jeff Oakes on saxophone, Michel Rose on pedal steel and Keith Stirling on trumpet. It provided their debut single, "Silly Girl", in the same month, with cover art depicting a dark forest and the band's name stylised as bare trees. The track was written by Pigott. Its music video showed a wistful Pigott singing and playing guitar. Australian musicologist, Ian McFarlane, described their sound as "winsome, witty pop." Christine Nestel of The Canberra Times opined that "[their] first album met with critical acclaim."

The group's second single, "Adaptability", followed a year later in November 1984. The track was co-written by Pigott, Hunter and their former XL Capris bandmate, Tim Gooding; it was used for the theme of a children's TV show, The Cartoon Connection (from 1985). Regular Records released a compilation album, So Far 1983-1985, in December 1985 on Regular/Festival Records. To promote the album Pigott and Hunter assembled a touring version of Scribble with Lee Borkman on keyboards and keyboard bass, Mike Caen on guitar and backing vocals (both ex-Pink Slips), and Tim Powles on drums (ex-Ward 13, on loan from the Venetians). That line-up recorded a studio album, Pop Art, which was issued in mid-1986 via Regular/Festival. Its cover depicts a pop art stylised version of Pigott. Hunter produced the album.

Pigott described her preference when performing, "Just singing, you can actually concentrate on entertaining rather than playing in tune. When you play and sing you have to concentrate on so many things – you're thinking is the amp right, is the mike OK, are you singing in tune. It's a real luxury just being able to relate to the audience without all those things to worry about." By that time the line-up was Pigott, Hunter, Borkman and Caen joined by Neville Anderson (also ex-Pink Slips) on drums, Mark Bell on guitar (ex-Blam Blam Blam, Coconut Rough) and Sandy Chick on backing vocals (ex-Rockmelons).

The album had ten tracks, including three singles: "Sunday School" (April 1986), "Don't Give Your Heart Away" (July) and "Alligator" (November) – all are co-written by Pigott and Hunter. Pigott's punk nickname from her time in XL Capris had been Alligator Bagg. "Alligator" was later performed by Fleur Beaupert on the TV drama series, Heartbreak High, episodes No. 133 and No. 145 (Series 6, 1998). The Canberra Times' Laurence Boswell declared that their recorded sound was "soft and smooth" compared with their live show, which was "harder and heavier — partly due to the guitar work of [Bell]."

At the end of 1986 the group's line-up was Pigott, Bell, Nicolette Boaz on keyboards, Bill Heckenberg on drums and Geoff Lundren on bass guitar. Hunter had returned to his work with Dragon. During 1986 Melanie Oxley provided backing vocals. Scribble toured in support of the album and its singles. They disbanded in 1987 and Pigott continued song writing with Hunter. Hunter revealed that "there are film projects that we've got that we have to start soon... There are all these projects on hold. [Dragon's] taking up a lot of time at the moment." Although achieving some cult interest there was little commercial success for Scribble. Both Borkman (1989) and Caen (1989, 1995) were later members of Dragon.

== Members ==
- Todd Hunter – bass guitar, keyboards (1983–86)
- Johanna Pigott – lead vocals, guitar, keyboards (1983–87)
- Lee Borkman – keyboards, keyboard bass (1985–86)
- Mike Caen – guitar, backing vocals (1985–86)
- Tim Powles – drums (1985–86)
- Neville Anderson – drums (1986)
- Mark Bell – guitar (1986–87)
- Sandy Chick – backing vocals (1986)
- Boaz Nicolette – keyboards (1986–87)
- Bill Heckenberg – drums (1986–87)
- Geoff Lundren – bass guitar (1986)
- Melanie Oxley – backing vocals (1986)

== Discography ==
=== Albums ===
- So Far 1983-1985 (December 1985) Regular Records/Festival Records
- Pop Art (mid-1986) Regular/Festival

=== Extended plays ===
- Scribble (November 1983) Regular/WEA

=== Singles ===
- "Silly Girl" (November 1983) Regular/WEA
- "Adaptability" (November 1984) Regular
- "Sunday School" (April 1986) Regular/Festival
- "Don't Give Your Heart Away" (July 1986) Regular/Festival
- "Alligator" (November 1986) Regular/Festival
