= Peter Menzies Jr. =

Australian cinematographer

- Born: Sydney, New South Wales, Australia
- Years active: 1979–present
- Organization(s): American Society of Cinematographers; Australian Cinematographers Society
- Website: www.petermenziesjr.com

Peter Gary Menzies Jr., ASC ACS is an Australian cinematographer, best known for his work on blockbuster action films.

== Early life and career ==
Menzies was born in Sydney. He was introduced to the film industry by his father, director and cinematographer Peter Menzies Sr.

He started as a camera loader and worked his way through the ranks in commercials and features as a camera assistant, and later as an operator, working regularly under DPs David Gribble and Russell Boyd.

Menzies became a member of the Australian Cinematographers Society in 1996, and the American Society of Cinematographers in 2024. He is also a member of the Academy of Motion Picture Arts and Sciences, and is the Chairman of the Board for the Grand Jury of the Cordillera International Film Festival in Reno/Tahoe Nevada.

== Filmography ==
=== Film ===
Year	Title	Director
1992	White Sands	Roger Donaldson
1993	Posse	Mario Van Peebles
1994	The Getaway	Roger Donaldson
1995	Die Hard with a Vengeance	John McTiernan
1996	A Time to Kill	Joel Schumacher
1998	Hard Rain	Mikael Salomon
1999	The General's Daughter	Simon West
1999	The 13th Warrior	John McTiernan
2000	The Kid	Jon Turteltaub
2000	Bless the Child	Chuck Russell
2001	Lara Croft: Tomb Raider	Simon West
2003	Kangaroo Jack	David McNally
2005	Man of the House	Stephen Herek
2005	Miss Congeniality 2: Armed and Fabulous	John Pasquin
2005	Four Brothers	John Singleton
2005	The Great Raid	John Dahl
2006	When a Stranger Calls	Simon West
2007	Shooter	Antoine Fuqua
2008	The Incredible Hulk	Louis Leterrier
2010	Clash of the Titans	Louis Leterrier
2011	Abduction	John Singleton
2012	Playing for Keeps	Gabriele Muccino
2013	Killing Season	Mark Steven Johnson
2014	The Expendables 3	Patrick Hughes
2016	Gods of Egypt	Alex Proyas
2017	All Eyez on Me	Benny Boom
2018	Peter Rabbit	Will Gluck
2019	A Dog's Way Home	Charles Martin Smith
2021	Peter Rabbit 2: The Runaway	Will Gluck
2025	The Yellow Tie	Serge Ioan Celebidachi
2026	Northbound	William Scoular
2026	Confession	Václav Marhoul

Short film

Year	Title	Director
1995	Hayride to Hell	Kimble Rendall
2018	Rising	David Nutter

=== Television ===
Year	Title	Director	Notes
2007	Traveler	David Nutter	Episode "Pilot"
2009	Hawthorne	Mikael Salomon	Episode "Pilot"
2016	Roots	Mario Van Peebles; Thomas Carter; Bruce Beresford	3 episodes
2020	The Right Stuff	Chris Long	2 episodes
2022	The Time Traveler's Wife	David Nutter	All 6 episodes
2025	Washington Black	Wanuri Kahiu; Maurice Marable; Rob Seidenglanz	3 episodes

TV movies

Year	Title	Director
2016	Surviving Compton: Dre, Suge & Michel'le	Janice Cooke
2018	The Bad Seed	Rob Lowe
2019	Love You to Death	Alex Kalymnios
