= Chase the Sun (EP) =

EP by Dragon
- Released: 2 September 2011
- Recorded: 2011
- Genre: Rock, pop
- Label: Ozmomusic
- Producer: Dragon

Dragon chronology
It's All Too Beautiful (2011)	Chase the Sun (2011)	The Great Divide (2011)

Singles from Chase the Sun
- 1. "Chase the Sun" Released: 4 April 2011

Chase the Sun is an extended play by the New Zealand band Dragon. The EP was released in September 2011.

Upon release, band member Todd Hunter said; “We are releasing this EP because it's what we do and we love it. The band may have been around for a long time but not in this form. It's a case of old brand / new band and it's thrilling to write and play new stuff.”

Drummond continued; “During 2010 the band spent a lot of time traveling both at home [in Australia] and in New Zealand. I was determined to write some songs, so I spent my spare time in hotels and airports etc, sketching ideas and recording rough demos. I took those ideas home and played them to Bec. We talked about lyric ideas and had fun fleshing the sketches out together. Sometimes the demos were already fairly complete and we finished them off together. Other times it was Bec who brought melodies or lyric ideas for us to work on. Most of the songs evolved that way. For my part the lyrics are based on the things I feel about the world around me; the climate we're living in and the social conventions and dysfunctions that we're greeted with on a daily basis.”

The EP was launched at The Basement, Sydney on 21 July 2011.

== Track listing ==
1. "21 (Heart of Gold)" (Pete Drummond, Rebecca Drummond) – 3:37
2. "Words" (P. Drummond) – 3:49
3. "Chase the Sun" (P., R. Drummond) – 3:31
4. "Meet Me at the End of the World" (P., R. Drummond) – 3:27
5. "Mad World" (P. Drummond, R. Drummond, Bruce Reid) – 3:33

== Personnel ==
- Todd Hunter – bass, banjo, melodica
- Mark Williams – vocals
- Pete Drummond – drums, percussion, mandolin, keyboards, guitar, vocals
- Bruce Reid – guitar, lap steel, keyboards, vocals

== Release history ==
Region	Date	Format	Edition(s)	Label
Australia	2 September 2011	digital download	Standard	Ozmomusic
