= Solid Citizens =

- Years active: 1981-1986
- Labels: RCA
- Past members: Michael Walker; Glen Muirhead; Geoff Lungren; John Barnes; Scott Williams; Len Henderson

Solid Citizens were an Australian rock band who dressed in newspaper print dinner suits. Their single "Singing In The Shower" made Australian singles chart.

Solid Citizens was originally made up of Michael Walker, Glen Muirhead, John Barnes, Scott Williams and Len Henderson. This line up broke up in 1982 and soon after a single "You’re Not Alone" was released. After the song generated some interest Walker and Muirhead reunited and signed with RCA. In 1984 they released "Singing in the Shower" which peaked at number 59 in early 1985. The song had previously appeared in the TV series Sweet and Sour (1984 TV series) where it was sung by Deborah Conway. Geoff Lungren was added to the line up and they released another single "(Just Don't) Care At All" in 1985.

== Discography ==
=== Singles ===
List of singles, with Australian chart positions
Year	Title	Peak chart positions
Year	Title	AUS
1982	"You're Not Alone"	-
1984	"Singing in the Shower"	59
1985	"(Just Don't) Care At All"	-
