= Age of Reason (album) =

Studio album by John Farnham
- Released: 25 July 1988
- Genres: Synthpop; rock
- Length: 52:50
- Labels: Sony BMG; RCA; Wheatley
- Producer: Ross Fraser

John Farnham chronology
Whispering Jack (1986)	Age of Reason (1988)	Chain Reaction (1990)

Singles from Age of Reason
- 1. "Age of Reason" Released: 4 July 1988; 2. "Two Strong Hearts" Released: 26 September 1988; 3. "Beyond the Call" Released: 14 November 1988; 4. "We're No Angels" Released: February 1989

Professional ratings
Review scores
Source	Rating
AllMusic	2.5/5 stars

Age of Reason is the thirteenth studio album by Australian pop singer John Farnham. It was released through BMG in Australia on 25 July 1988 and debuted at No. 1 on the Australian Recording Industry Association (ARIA) Albums Chart in August and remained on top for eight weeks. It was the follow-up to his previous No. 1 album, Whispering Jack, and was the highest-selling album in Australia in 1988. As of 1997, it was eight times platinum, indicating sales of over 560,000 units. It is also critically considered one of Farnham's best albums, with the title track "Age of Reason" and "Beyond the Call" being about the urgency for the world to wake up and solve its problems.

The first two singles from the album were "Age of Reason", which peaked at No. 1, and "Two Strong Hearts", at No. 6. Two further singles were released: "Beyond the Call", which reached the top 50, and "We're No Angels".

At the 1988 ARIA Awards, Farnham won the Best Male Artist, Best Adult Contemporary Album and the Outstanding Achievement Award.

The album was re-released on vinyl on 18 August 2017 by Sony Music.

== Background ==
Farnham released Whispering Jack in October 1986, becoming the highest-selling album by an Australian act in Australia and peaked at No. 1 on the Australian Kent Music Report Album Charts for a, then record, total of 25 weeks. Ahead of his follow-up album, in July 1988, he released the title single, "Age of Reason", which peaked at No. 1 on the ARIA Singles Chart, It was written by Johanna Pigott and Dragon member Todd Hunter. The album, Age of Reason, which was produced by Ross Fraser, debuted at No. 1 on the ARIA Albums Chart in August and stayed on top for eight weeks. It was the highest-selling album in Australia from 1988, and, as of 1997, it was 8 × platinum indicating sales of over 560,000 units. Renewed interest in Whispering Jack returned that album to the Top Ten in August, nearly two years after its initial release.

== Track listing ==
1. "Age of Reason" (Todd Hunter, Johanna Pigott) – 5:08
2. "Blow by Blow" (Dave Stewart, Olle Ormo, Brian Harrison) – 4:37
3. "Listen to the Wind" (Brent Thomas, Jon Stevens) – 4:26
4. "Two Strong Hearts" (Bruce Woolley, Andy Hill) – 3:35
5. "Burn Down the Night" (Bill LaBounty) – 3:32
6. "Beyond the Call" (David Batteau, Darrell Brown, Kevin Dukes) – 4:43
7. "We're No Angels" (Ross Wilson) – 4:52
8. "Don't Tell Me It Can't Be Done" (Chris Thompson, Andy Qunta) – 3:35
9. "The Fire" (Thompson, Keith Reid, Jed Leiber) – 4:26
10. "Some Do, Some Don't" (Stephen Hague, Mark Mueller) – 4:19

CD bonus tracks:

11. "When the War Is Over" (Steve Prestwich) – 4:50
12. "It's a Long Way to the Top (If You Wanna Rock 'n' Roll)" (Angus Young, Malcolm Young, Bon Scott) – 4:11

== Personnel ==
- John Farnham – vocals
- David Hirschfelder – keyboards
- Brett Garsed – guitars
- Angus Burchall – drums & percussion
- Wayne Nelson – bass
- Venetta Fields – vocals
- Lindsay Field – vocals
- Jon Stevens – guitar on "Listen to the Wind"
- James Morrison – trumpet on "Some Do, Some Don't"
- Bill Harrower – sax on "Blow by Blow"
- Thomas Metropouli – mandolin & piano accordion
- Lisa Edwards – additional vocals
- Ross Hannaford – additional vocals
- Joe Creighton – additional vocals

== Charts ==
=== Weekly charts ===
Chart (1988–89)	Peak position
Australian Albums (ARIA)	1
German Albums (Offizielle Top 100)	14
Dutch Albums (Album Top 100)	51
New Zealand Albums (RMNZ)	6
Norwegian Albums (VG-lista)	9
Swedish Albums (Sverigetopplistan)	4
Canada Top Albums (RPM)	46
Finnish Albums (The Official Finnish Charts)	18
European Albums (Eurotipsheet)	33

=== Year-end charts ===
Chart (1988)	Position
Australian Albums (ARIA)	13
Chart (1989)	Peak position
Australian Albums (ARIA)	71

== Certifications ==
Region	Certification	Certified units/sales
Australia (ARIA)	8× Platinum	780,000
New Zealand (RMNZ)	Platinum	15,000^{^}
Sweden (GLF)	Gold	50,000^{^}
^{^} Shipments figures based on certification alone.

== See also ==
- List of number-one albums of 1988 (Australia)
