= The Great Divide (EP) =

EP by Dragon
- Released: November 2011
- Recorded: 2011
- Genre: Rock, pop
- Label: Ozmomusic
- Producer: Dragon

Dragon chronology
Chase the Sun (2011)	The Great Divide (2011)	The Dragon Years (2012)

The Great Divide is an extended play by the New Zealand band Dragon. The EP was released digitally in November 2011.

During the press conference for Chase the Sun, band member Todd Hunter said “...fans can look out for several EP releases over the next 12 months.” This, being the second Dragon EP release in three months.

== Track listing ==
1. "Rainy Day" – 3:39
2. "Call Out" – 3:42
3. "New Blue Moon" – 3:35
4. "Don't Look Like Jim" – 3:56
5. "Radio Song" – 2:57
6. "The Great Divide" – 3:57
7. "Kumera Dreaming" – 2:53

== Personnel ==
- Todd Hunter – bass, banjo, melodica
- Mark Williams – vocals
- Pete Drummond – drums, percussion, mandolin, keyboards, guitar, vocals, saxophone (on, Don't I look Like Jim)
- Bruce Reid – guitar, lap steel, keyboards, vocals

== Release history ==
Region	Date	Format	Edition(s)	Label
Australia	November 2011	digital download	Standard	Ozmomusic
