= Beyond the Call (song) =

Single by John Farnham

from the album Age of Reason
- B-side: "Blow By Blow"
- Released: 14 November 1988
- Recorded: 1988
- Genre: Rock, pop rock
- Length: 4:34
- Label: RCA Records, Sony BMG
- Songwriter(s): David Batteau, Kevin Dukes, Darrell Brown
- Producer(s): Ross Fraser

John Farnham singles chronology
"Two Strong Hearts" (1988)	"Beyond the Call" (1988)	"We're No Angels" (1989)

"Beyond the Call" is a song by Australian singer John Farnham recorded the song and released it as the third single from his album Age of Reason (1988).

== Track listing ==
1. "Beyond The Call" - 4:34
2. "Blow By Blow" - 4:34
3. "Blow By Blow" (Extended 'Quake' Mix) - 8:00

== Chart history ==
Chart (1988)	Peak position
Australia (ARIA)	40
