= Daydream Believer (1992 film) =

- Directed by: Kathy Mueller
- Written by: Saturday Rosenberg
- Produced by: Ben Gannon
- Starring: Miranda Otto; Martin Kemp; Gia Carides
- Cinematography: Andrew Lesnie
- Edited by: Robert Gibson
- Music by: Todd Hunter; Johanna Pigott
- Production companies: Beyond Films; View Films; Australian Film Finance Corporation
- Distributed by: Hoyts-Fox-Columbia TriStar Films
- Release dates: 7 August 1992 (United Kingdom); 22 May 1993 (Australia)
- Running time: 82 minutes
- Country: Australia
- Language: English
- Box office: A$24,885 (Australia)

Daydream Believer aka The Girl Who Came Late (working title) is a 1992 Australian romantic comedy film starring Miranda Otto, Martin Kemp and Gia Carides; and directed by Kathy Mueller. Otto was nominated for an Australian Film Institute Award for "Best Actress in a Lead Role".

== Plot ==
The 'Girl' of the working title is Nell Tiscowitz (Otto), a struggling actress with an affinity for horses. She meets wealthy rock music promoter and stable owner Digby Olsen (Kemp). Nell's best friend and flatmate, Wendy (Carides) provides dubious love-lorn advice. After Nell uses her 'telepathy' to help Digby tame horses they eventually fall in love.

== Cast ==
- Miranda Otto as Nell Tiscowitz
- Martin Kemp as Digby Olsen
- Gia Carides as Wendy
- Anne Looby as Margo
- Bruce Venables as Stu
- Deidre Rubenstein as Trish Schultz
- Geoff Morrell as Brad Hislop
- Les Foxcroft as Perce
- Kerry Walker as Aunt Vera
- Peter Hehir as German film director
- Kieran Darcy-Smith as Stagehand (uncredited)

== Production ==
The film was one of five films financed by the FFC Film Fund in 1990. Otto was cast after over 200 girls auditioned; it was only her second major role, after Emma's War. The role of Digby entailed looking at actors from London and Los Angeles; after Martin Kemp was cast, the occupation of the character was changed from theatre entrepreneur to rock promoter.

== Release ==
Ozmovies says of the release:

The film was given a short release at four Hoyts cinemas (including Hoyts Centre) in Sydney, beginning 3rd September 1992, but other bookings were very limited... (It) had a frosty reception from newspaper reviewers at the time of its limited domestic release, which saw only Sydney papers (and the national The Australian) take a look at it.
