= Wilderworld =

Single by Dragon

from the album Body and the Beat
- Released: July 1984
- Genre: Rock
- Length: 3:51
- Label: Polydor Records, Mercury Records
- Songwriter(s): Johanna Pigott, Todd Hunter, Marc Hunter
- Producer(s): Carey Taylor

Dragon singles chronology
"Cry" (1984)	"Wilderworld" (1984)	"Body and the Beat" (1984)

"Wilderworld" is a song by New Zealand-Australian rock band Dragon released in July 1984 as the fourth single from the group's seventh studio album Body and the Beat (1984). The song peaked at number 42 on the Australian Kent Music Report.

== Track listing ==
1. "Wilderworld" (Johanna Pigott, Todd Hunter, Marc Hunter) – 3:51
2. "Easy Street" (Bruce Smeaton) (from the film Street Hero) -

== Charts ==
Chart (1984)	Peak position
Australian Kent Music Report	42
