= Kimble Rendall =

Australian director, musician and writer (1957–2025)

Kimble John Rendall
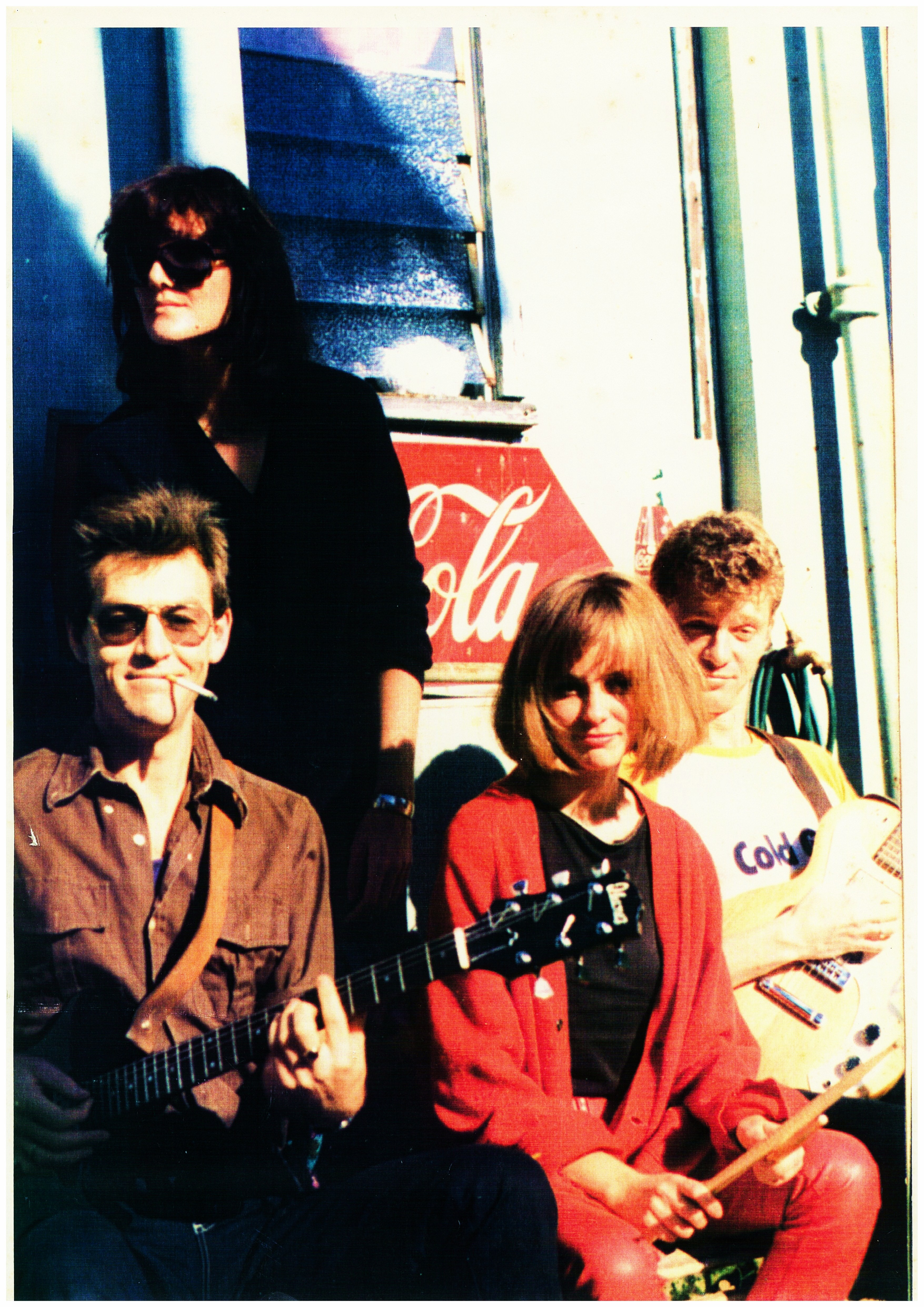
- XL Capris: Kimble Rendall, Johanna Pigott, Julie Anderson and Tim Gooding in Balmain, 1979
- Born: 1957; Sydney, New South Wales, Australia
- Died: 18 April 2025 (aged 67–68)
- Other name: Dag Rattler
- Occupations: Director, musician, writer
- Years active: 1978–20??
- Spouse: Basia Bonkowski (m. 1982; died 2022)
- Children: 2

Kimble John Rendall (1957 – 18 April 2025) was an Australian film director, musician and writer mostly known for his second unit direction of The Matrix Reloaded (2003), The Matrix Revolutions (2003), I, Robot (2004), Casanova (2005) and Ghost Rider (2007). As a musician Rendall was guitarist, vocalist and co-founder of punk rockers XL Capris and of rock band the Hoodoo Gurus.

== Career ==
=== Early works ===
Rendall used an 8mm camera to write and direct short films while still at school, he completed a Bachelor of Arts in Communication and Mass Media and then trained at Australian Broadcasting Commission (ABC) as a film editor. My Survival as an Aboriginal (1978) was a documentary written and directed by Essie Coffey on her life in the township of Brewarrina produced and edited by Rendall.

=== XL Capris ===
Rendall was taking acting lessons at the Nimrod Theatre when he met Tim Gooding and Johanna Pigott, and with their mutual interest in music they formed punk rock band XL Capris in 1978 (Rendall was called 'Dag Rattler'). Rendall played lead guitar and sang vocals with Gooding (guitars, vocals) and Pigott (bass guitar, vocals, keyboards). Early practice sessions were held in the front room of a Birchgrove house where Gooding (and later Rendall) lived. They were joined by Julie Anderson (drums) and achieved minor notoriety for their first single "My City of Sydney" (1979), Rendall co-wrote (with Gooding) their second single "Skylab (Son of Telstar)" but he left XL Capris after their next single "World War Three" (October, 1980). Pigott and Gooding created Sweet and Sour (1984) for ABC-TV which followed the first year of a fictional band, The Takeaways, and was based on their experiences with XL Capris.

=== Hoodoo Gurus ===
A chance meeting on New Year's Eve with fellow guitarists Dave Faulkner and Roddy Radalj, led to the formation of the Hoodoo Gurus (with drummer James Baker) in January 1981. Rendall also managed the band whilst they developed the material for their first album Stoneage Romeos. The band supported Gary Glitter on his national tour. Rendall had a meeting with Joe Strummer at The Sebel Townhouse when The Clash were looking for a Sydney support act. Strummer sat at the pool bar between swims, in his swimming costume and dripping wet. The band dropped the "Le" to become Hoodoo Gurus and later, after Rendall's departure, had a #3 Australian hit with "What's My Scene?" (1987). Hoodoo Gurus iconic status on the Australian rock scene was acknowledged when they were inducted into the 2007 ARIA Hall of Fame.

=== Music video director ===
Rendall returned to film as a Music video director with clips for: XL Capris, Sardine v, Scribble, Peter Blakeley, Mental as Anything, UB40, Hoodoo Gurus, Shooting School (You Won't Listen), Allniters (Montego Bay & I Saw you First)The Angels (e.g. "Between the Eyes"), Cold Chisel (e.g. "Flame Trees"), Dragon, Rockmelons, Hunters and Collectors, and Boom Crash Opera. He was voted Australia's top music video director in a poll conducted by Rolling Stone magazine.

=== Second unit director ===
In 1994, Rendall set up Flat Rock Pictures to direct TV commercials and, later, film projects. He won all the major awards in advertising including a Cannes Lion. He directed a short film Hayride to Hell (1995) featuring Kylie Minogue and Richard Roxburgh and the teen slasher flick, Cut (2000) which starred Molly Ringwald and Minogue. Cut went to number two at the box office in France and was the second most popular Australian film there behind Strictly Ballroom. It also went to number two in Asia. Rendall became the second unit director for The Matrix Reloaded, The Matrix Revolutions and the associated video game Enter the Matrix (all in 2003). He was also second unit director for Casanova (2004) Ghost Rider (2007)., Underworld: Rise of the Lycans (2009) and Knowing (2008).

=== Director ===
Rendall was set to direct the Australian-Chinese thriller film The Nest 3D.

Year	Film	Notes
1995	Hayride to Hell	Short film
2000	Cut	
2012	Bait 3D	
2018	Guardians of the Tomb	

== Personal life and death ==
Rendall married television presenter and producer, Basia Bonkowski in 1982 and the couple had two adopted children: William and Camille. Bonkowski died on 3 September 2022.

Rendall died on 18 April 2025, a Facebook post from Melissa Hoyer announcing Rendall's death was posted on 20 April 2025.

== Awards and nominations ==
=== ARIA Music Awards ===
The ARIA Music Awards is an annual awards ceremony that recognises excellence, innovation, and achievement across all genres of Australian music. They commenced in 1987.

Year	Nominee / work	Award	Result	Ref.
1987	Kimble Rendall for "Hands Up in the Air" (Boom Crash Opera)	Best Video	Nominated	
