= Hayride to Hell =

- Directed by: Kimble Rendall
- Written by: Kimble Rendall; Phillip Roope
- Produced by: Victoria Treole
- Starring: Kylie Minogue; Richard Roxburgh
- Cinematography: Peter Menzies Jr.
- Edited by: Gary Hillberg
- Music by: Dave Faulkner
- Release date: 1995
- Running time: 10 minutes
- Country: Australia
- Language: English

Hayride to Hell is a 1995 Australian drama short film co-written and directed by Kimble Rendall and starring Kylie Minogue and Richard Roxburgh. It tells the story of salesman George Weygate, who comes across a girl begging for his help. Only shown in late night art houses, the film has never been widely released. It is believed that Minogue became involved in the project as a favour to the director, whom she would work with five years later on the film Cut (2000).

== Plot summary ==
The film's lead character George Weygate, a kind family man, meets a young woman while driving home from work, the girl suggests she is suffering from a diabetic seizure and demands him to take her to a block of flats as soon as possible to fictional Walker Street, in Sydney's Darlinghurst. He complies, but is left wondering what is going on. When they reach their destination, the girl departs from the car without saying a word, heading towards the block of flats. Weygate, realizing that she left her belongings in the back of his car, goes after her to return them to her. After finding her apartment, he realizes that he has been mysteriously locked in. In an effort to escape he begins to scale the building. A neighbour tries to stop his escape, but is unsuccessful. He later discovers the girl slumped on the floor in the building's elevator. He goes to help her, but she screams at him for stealing her bag. Eventually he manages to escape the building and returns home.

== Cast ==
- Kylie Minogue: The Girl
- Richard Roxburgh: George Weygate
- Chloe Angel: Weygate Child
- Patsy Flanagan: Buelgie Woman
- Daphnee King: Neighbour
- Victoria Longley: Hilary Weygate
- Scott Love: Detective #2
- Ellie MacCarthy: Weygate Child
- Iris Shand: Old Woman
- Ross Sharp: Detective #1
