= Chain Reaction (John Farnham album) =

Studio album by John Farnham
- Released: 24 September 1990
- Studios: Metropolis Audio, Melbourne
- Length: 51:59
- Labels: Sony BMG; RCA; Wheatley
- Producer: Ross Fraser

John Farnham chronology
Age of Reason (1988)	Chain Reaction (1990)	Full House (1991)

Singles from Chain Reaction
- 1. "Chain Reaction" Released: 6 August 1990; 2. "That's Freedom" Released: 17 September 1990; 3. "Burn For You" Released: 12 November 1990; 4. "In Days to Come" Released: March 1991

Chain Reaction is the 14th studio album by Australian singer John Farnham. It was released in Australia on 24 September 1990, becoming the highest selling album in Australia for that year, which debuted at No. 1 on the ARIA albums chart. By the end of the following year it was accredited 7× platinum by Australian Recording Industry Association (ARIA) for shipment of 490,000 units.

It provided four singles: the title track (August 1990) reached No. 6, "That's Freedom" (September) peaked at No. 6, "Burn for You" (November) reached No. 5 and "In Days to Come" (March 1991) peaked at No. 49. Chain Reaction was re-released on vinyl on 18 August 2017 by Sony Music.

== Background ==
John Farnham was keen to change his sound on Chain Reaction from his previous two studio albums Whispering Jack (October 1986) and Age of Reason (July 1988). Consequently, he enlisted the song writing help of Southern Sons' guitarist Phil Buckle, producer Ross Fraser and former bandmate and keyboardist David Hirschfelder: nine of the twelve songs on the album are co-written by Farnham. Doug Brady was brought in as audio engineer, whose daughter was born during recording sessions: her photo is in the centre of the front cover.

Farnham chose to launch Chain Reaction at the New South Wales 1990 Rugby League Grand Final at Sydney Football Stadium on 23 September as part of its pre-game entertainment. His set included the debut live performance of its second single, "That's Freedom".

== Reception ==
Professional ratings
Review scores
Source	Rating
Allmusic	2.5/5 stars

According to AllMusic's Jonathan Lewis, Chain Reaction saw Farnham "aiming for the adult contemporary market." Lewis praised "In Days to Come" as "a great song that became a deserving Australian hit."

== Chain Reaction tour and DVD ==
The album was promoted by his nationwide Chain Reaction Tour. Mid-tour he attended Parliament House, Canberra in November 1990 to lobby sitting members, Ros Kelly and John Button, to bring in harsher penalties against bootleg and pirate recordings. The Canberra Times' Megan Bird reported his talent manager, Glenn Wheatley's claim that Farnham is "the most bootlegged artist in Australia." The tour concluded with a televised performance at Rod Laver Arena in Melbourne, (then known as Flinders Park National Tennis Centre), on either 14 and 15 December 1990. This performance aired on Australia's Channel Seven and was released on VHS. The video album was reissued as a DVD, Chain Reaction Live in Concert on 13 November 2005.

== Track listing ==
All tracks are written by Phil Buckle, John Farnham and Ross Fraser, unless otherwise indicated.

Chain Reaction (VPCD 0830, PD 74768)
No.	Title	Writer(s)	Length
1.	"That's Freedom"	Jean Anne Chapman, Thomas E Kimmel	4:19
2.	"In Days to Come"	Farnham, Fraser, David Hirschfelder	4:06
3.	"Burn for You"		3:33
4.	"See the Banners Fall"	Farnham, Fraser, Hirschfelder	4:35
5.	"I Can Do Anything"		4:27
6.	"All Our Sons and Daughters"		4:09
7.	"Chain Reaction"	David A. Stewart, Siobhan Fahey	3:12
8.	"In Your Hands"		4:21
9.	"New Day"		4:16
10.	"The Time Has Come"	Joe Creighton, Farnham, Fraser	4:58
11.	"The First Step"	Chris Thompson, Jean-Jacques Kravetz, Keith Reid	4:54
12.	"Time and Money"		5:13
Total length:			51:59

== Personnel ==
Credited to:

- John Farnham – vocals, acoustic guitar
- David Hirschfelder – keyboards, bass guitar, string arrangements, programming, piano
- Brett Garsed – guitars
- Angus Burchall – drums & percussion
- Phil Buckle – guitars
- Jack Jones – guitars
- Tommy Emmanuel – guitars
- Ross Fraser – guitars, producer
- Steve Williams – tenor sax, harmonica
- Venetta Fields – vocals
- Lindsay Field – vocals
- Doug Brady – engineer

== Charts ==
=== Weekly charts ===
Chart (1990/91)	Peak position
Australian Albums (ARIA)	1
Dutch Albums (Album Top 100)	88
New Zealand Albums (RMNZ)	8
Swedish Albums (Sverigetopplistan)	35
Canada Top Albums (RPM)	56

=== Year-end charts ===
Chart (1990)	Position
Australian Albums (ARIA)	1
Chart (1991)	Position
Australian Albums (ARIA)	19

== Certifications ==
Region	Certification	Certified units/sales
Australia (ARIA)	8× Platinum	560,000^{^}
New Zealand (RMNZ)	Gold	7,500^{^}
^{^} Shipments figures based on certification alone.

== See also ==
- List of number-one albums of 1990 (Australia)
