= Magic (Dragon song) =

Single by Dragon

from the album Body and the Beat
- Released: November 1983
- Genre: Rock
- Length: 3:57
- Label: Polydor Records, Mercury Records
- Songwriters: Robert Taylor, Marc Hunter
- Producer: Alan Mansfield

Dragon singles chronology
"Rain" (1983)	"Magic" (1983)	"Cry" (1984)

"Magic" is a song by New Zealand-Australian rock band Dragon released in November 1983 as the second single from the group's seventh studio album Body and the Beat (1984). The song peaked at number 33 on the Australian Kent Music Report.

== Track listing ==
1. "Magic" (Robert Taylor, Marc Hunter) - 3:57
2. "April Sun in Cuba" (Marc Hunter, Paul Hewson) (Live In Concert 1982) -

== Charts ==
Chart (1983/84)	Peak position
Australian Kent Music Report	33
