= Sweet and Sour (1984 TV series) =

Australian television series

- Sweet and Sour TV Soundtrack album cover
- Genre: 1980s Music, Drama
- Created by: Tim Gooding; Johanna Pigott
- Developed by: ABC Drama Department
- Starring: Tracy Mann; David Reyne; Sandra Lillingston; Arky Michael; Ric Herbert; Robin Copp
- Voices of: Deborah Conway; John Clifforth; Cathy McQuade (singing voices)
- Theme music composer: Sharon O'Neill; Martin Armiger
- Country of origin: Australia
- Original language: English
- No. of seasons: 1
- No. of episodes: 20

Production
- Producer: Jan Chapman
- Production locations: Sydney, Australia
- Running time: 30 min

Original release
- Network: ABC TV
- Release: 2 July – 2 August 1984

Related
- Countdown; Heroes (NZ TV Series: 1984, 1986)

Sweet and Sour was an Australian television series that screened on the Australian Broadcasting Corporation (ABC) in 1984. It was created by Tim Gooding and Johanna Pigott and was produced internally for the ABC by Jan Chapman.

== Synopsis ==
The main storyline of the series followed the efforts of a fictional band, The Takeaways, to break into the Sydney music scene. "The Takeaways have so far eluded commercial success. However, negotiations are presently underway for the band to sell their story to a prominent TV station, and really clean up."

In mid-1983 Sydney a band called The Takeaways is formed. Initially it consists of Carol Howard, Martin Kabel and George Poulopoulos. Carol Howard (Tracy Mann) is an attractive vocalist and novice guitarist from Melbourne; she had pursued an acting career with little success but is now focussed on her music. Carol wrote her first song on the train to Sydney.

Martin Kabel (David Reyne) is an established, albeit unsuccessful, guitarist who wants to branch out from his current band: he would like to sing his own songs. Martin gets his chance with The Takeaways.

George Poulopoulos (Arky Michael) is more interested in playing soccer for the Combined Hellenic Travel Agents but reluctantly joins to play bass. He learns how to play at the band's first practice session; slowly he overcomes his shyness to become a confident performer.

Darrell Winters (Ric Herbert) sees a quick dollar to be made as their manager; Darrell talks the talk and tries to walk the walk. He sets out to organise their first gig: a backyard barbecue! Fortunately better gigs followed in various Sydney pubs. Their first jam sessions are in an old boot factory.

Meanwhile, Christine Yates (Sandra Lillingston) breaks into their house and rather than turn her in to the police they offer her a spot in their band. Christine's father, legendary 1960s saxophonist Shrug Yates (Martin Vaughan), taught her to 'feel' music while playing sax. Christine sings lead vocal on some songs.

Initially they play their gigs using a drum machine until Johnny Black (Robin Copp), an established drummer, joins.

George Poulopoulos (Arky Michael), Christine Yates (Sandra Lillingston), Martin Kabel (David Reyne), Carol Howard (Tracy Mann), Johnny Black (Robin Copp) as The Takeaways with manager Darrell Winters (Ric Herbert)

Some six months later, The Takeaways release an independent single, Sweet and Sour, and await the pressing of their first album. They meet recording executives and media personalities including Ian "Molly" Meldrum and artist Jon English. They undertake a tour of Melbourne to promote the first single.

There is some romantic tension between Carol and Martin, and between George and Christine. Martin is brash and confident but his Lothario image is belied by his naivety when he deals with a female music executive (Megan Williams). Darrell starts to believe his own PR and eventually becomes more interested in his music video career than the band. Manipulation by music industry insiders sees both Martin and Carol tempted by solo deals; eventually the group splits.

The outer cover of their first Soundtrack album shows The Takeaways in a similar pose to the inner cover photo but has them as neon outlines whereas the second Soundtrack has the same neon outlines but with a reversed design. The neon outlines were also animated and used on their first promo video.

Other actors in the show included Megan Williams, Martin Vaughan as Christine's father Shrug, Jane Clifton, Rocky Horror star Daniel Abineri, George Spartels as Nick, George's older brother, Carmen Tanti and Michelle Stayner.

== Logie Awards ==
The TV series launched the career of David Reyne (TV Week Logie Award 1985 Best New Talent in Australia) as the charismatic band member Martin, contrasting the introverted George (played by Arky Michael).

== Episodes ==
1. Martin quits Lone Sharks (fronted by Mark Edwards of The Runners) who are shown performing Crocodile Shoes. He moves into a warehouse with Darrell who is an amateur music photographer. Carol moves from Melbourne to Sydney for a new start and joins them. George has trouble collecting the rent for his brother Nick, whom he works for at his Travel Agency. Martin performs Down The Road. Guest appearance is Renee Geyer as the train hostess.
2. Darrell shoots a video to the sound of the Sweet And Sour theme and tries to get Carol and Martin to form a band while trying to buy time paying the rent to Nick. Carol sells her own designed clothes while at the Dole office Martin tries to avoid work. George is invited to join on bass.
3. The band go to a record executive's party. Christine breaks into the warehouse and stalks Martin. Darrell still steals every scene. Carol pens Sweet & Sour. Martin introduces Christine to the band who endears herself to the group by fixing the keyboard.
4. Darrell prepares for his 21st and gets the band to make their debut there. Christine starts practicing the saxophone again with help from her father Shrug (Martin Vaughan) and joins the band. Dave Mason from The Reels makes a brief appearance.
5. After their first gig the go to the beach dancing to Singing In The Shower. George and Nick's dad buys 4000 dolls. Martin and Ric try to raise funds with an escapologist act in the mall while Nick and George ponder what to do with 4000 dolls. Nick's wife Nina (Carmen Tanti) is supportive of George's music.
6. Martin's mystery woman (Urszula Anna-Teresa) turns out to be his mother who wants to stay in touch. Ric and George try thinking of how to sell the dolls. George stumbles as he tries to tell Christine how he feels. Christine and George perform a routine/clip for Image Of An Angel.
7. Darrell gets the band's first pub gig booked. George's dad has a 65th birthday party and George inadvertently invites the whole band plus the Telecom man when he tried to ask Christine to come. Robert Hughes (as Darrell's tech school teacher) and Kirk Pengilly make guest appearances.
8. Martin starts his night cleaning job as the band gets ready for their first gig at the Garry Owen Hotel where they perform Too Hot To Move.
9. Johnny is invited to join the band as drummer. Martin quits his cleaning job. Darrell interviews Ignatius Jones in a cemetery at night. George is in love. Carol performs No Focus.
10. Darrell tries to get No Focus picked up by radio only to find out it is similar to Dead Lions song Psychosis. Carol confronts Leo (Daniel Abineri) about stealing her song but finds she is wrong. Shrug starts his job selling supermarket records. Christine performs Glam To Wham while taking on a job as a checkout chick. Peter Oxley of Sunnyboys is the guest appearance in this episode buying mountains of Lux soap powder. The band get invited to a Dead Lions gig and to join them as a support act.
11. Carol and Leo meet up. Darrell tries his managerial skills against the Dead Lions manager Pat Mason (Amanda Muggleton) and comes up a bit short. George's dad buys a bus which Nick thinks they can use for Nite Tours of Sydney. The band don't do well as a support for the Dead Lions. Special guest is Marc Hunter as Pat Mason's secretary. Tim Gooding (co-creator) makes an appearance as a postman.
12. The band want out of supporting Dead Lions but cannot get out of their contract. Leo tries to encourage Carol to join him in the US. George becomes tour bus driver while Darrell gets a touring German Rugby team to act as positive crowd support as the band perform Good Advice. Carol decides to stay with the band.
13. Martin gets disenchanted with the band's progress and is influenced by Charlie (Megan Williams) and her Fairlight. Darrell books a studio to do a demo but it costs $500 so they do a gig at the Pleasant Grove Bowling Club.
14. Darrell makes documentaries about himself and discovers the Hoons. Carol feels under pressure, Christine feels rejected, George has computer problems, Martin heads in a different direction with Charlie. They get together for a great performance at the fashion parade to raise the rest of the money needed for the demo. Brian Kawolsky (Robin Stewart), a promoter introduces himself.
15. Plans don't meet expectations. Darrell is persuaded to drop the Hoons and leaves the band to concentrate on videos. Martin finds he can't connect with Charlie's music and Shrug quits his record selling job that girlfriend Kerry (Michelle Stayner) had set up. Martin performs It's A Game
16. The band hit the recording studio to lay down Sweet And Sour. Martin finally decides to show up. George quits the band and takes over as manager. Their gig, featuring Moon & Stars, is a success. Sweet And Sour gets played on radio.
17. Sweet And Sour gets pressed and the band try to get it into the shops. A magazine interview does not go to plan. The gigs get better under George's management.
18. The band respond to media and management issues. They make a clip for Sweet And Sour and make their TV debut late at night.
19. The band travel to Melbourne with internal differences between the members exposed when George left too much to the booking agency and the trip bombed financially.
20. The band plays their last gig, performing Heart Plays Tricks, Singing In The Shower, Hip Romeo, Glam To Wham, Party On Wheels. Johanna Pigott (co-creator) makes an appearance dancing to the music.

== Musicians and songwriters ==
Numerous Australian and New Zealand musicians and songwriters were involved in this TV series.

The title song of the series,"Sweet and Sour", was written by Sharon O'Neill, who also recorded the song in 1987 as "In Control" on her album Danced in the Fire. Deborah Conway (Do-Ré-Mi) was actor Tracy Mann's 'singing voice' and sang the hit "Sweet & Sour" (#13 Australian national singles chart). The song's lyrics relate to self-empowerment in the face of life's vagaries: "Life can be sweet and sour, But I am in control. It can chill me to the bone, Give me wings to fly on my own."

Music was directed by Martin Armiger (The Sports, Stephen Cummings Band) who also provided backing vocals, lead guitar, bass guitar, keyboards, drums and lyrics. Associate Music Director Graham Bidstrup (The Angels, GANGgajang) also provided backing vocals, keyboards, percussion and lyrics. In 1980, Bidstrup had produced a single, "Russia Rocks", for an Australian group The Takeaways. Assistant to Music Director Stephen O'Rourke also provided backing vocals.

The list of recording musicians/songwriters includes Tommy Emmanuel, Chris Bailey (The Angels, GANGgajang), Eric McCusker (Mondo Rock), Red Symons (Skyhooks), "Freddie" Strauks (Skyhooks), Todd Hunter (Dragon, XL Capris), Rick Grossman (Divinyls, Hoodoo Gurus), Mark Edwards (The Runners), Tony Buchanan (Billy Thorpe & The Aztecs mk2) and Reg Mombassa (Mental As Anything).

Cathy McQuade (Deckchairs Overboard) was Sandra Lillingston's 'singing voice' and John Clifforth (Deckchairs Overboard) was David Reyne's 'singing voice' (both Reyne and Herbert sang backing vocals on some tracks).

The soundtrack album went platinum, selling over 70,000 copies.

Australian band GANGgajang were formed as a direct result of four of their members involvement as musicians/songwriters for this show: Chris Bailey, Graham Bidstrup, Mark Callaghan and Kay Bee.

Cameo appearances from other Australian musicians include, The Johnnys playing Slip Slap Fishin' and Rebel Yell live in Episode 3 and Richard Clapton playing acoustic in the street in Episode 6. Kirk Pengilly from INXS appeared in Episode 7 and Chrissie Amphlett from the Divinyls popped up in Episode 8.

== Countdown links ==
As an ABC TV show, there was a natural tie-in to Countdown, with guest appearance by Ian "Molly" Meldrum. "Sweet & Sour" (lead vocal Conway) was shown on the 12 August 1984 episode of Countdown. The promo clip does not show The Takeaways' 'bass player' George (Arky Michael), but does include a juggler, acrobat and stage magician. On the same Countdown episode were O'Neill performing "Power" and Stephen Cummings performing "Gymnasium" (Armiger as producer/musician/songwriter). "Glam To Wham" (lead vocal Conway, backing vocal McQuade) was broadcast Countdown on 7 October 1984, with guest hosts Michael, Lillingston and Herbert of The Takeaways (during which Herbert refers to Arky Michael as "Spartels"). It shows Lillingston miming to Conway's vocals; however, in the "Sweet and Sour" TV series Lillingston's vocals were supplied by McQuade and she only sang lead on "Digging A Hole" and "On The Street Where You Live". Also on the 7 October episode was Cummings performing "Another Kick to the Head" (Armiger as producer/musician/songwriter).

The pilot episode was directed by Grant Rule, an Executive Producer of Countdown, it was shot in an old warehouse in Pyrmont and starred Terry Serio from the Elks and Joy Smithers, who would later star in Bangkok Hilton mini series with Nicole Kidman. The guitar player was Marty Shiel (Juggernaut). Another link to Countdown is the selection and briefing of songwriters by Countdown Awards co-producer Carolyn James, credited as researcher on the LP sleeve. On advice from Peter Hall at Rondor Publishing, Carolyn also negotiated with Jan Chapman a first for ABC drama. Instead of a one-off single payment for a song, a "No Favoured Nations" contract was offered to all songwriters. This meant the music budget stretched much further, and that signed and unsigned writers received ongoing royalty payments for each unit sold and so provided significant income to lesser-known songwriters such as David McComb of The Triffids. Graham Thorburn came up from producing and directing Countdown to direct four episodes.

New Zealand's TVNZ series Heroes, released 21 October 1984, "is about a group of musicians just getting started as a rock 'n' roll band". It ran for 8 episodes in 1984 and 6 in 1986. Actors included Michael Hurst, Jay Laga'aia, Margaret Umbers and John Gibson.

== Creators, Writers, and Directors ==
Tim Gooding and Johanna Pigott were members of Sydney post-punk band, XL Capris (1978–1982). Dragon bassist Todd Hunter later produced the band before joining the line-up. Pigott and Hunter wrote "Rain" for the reformed Dragon, and "Age of Reason" for John Farnham. Gooding and Pigott both wrote for the TV Series Heartbreak High(Hunter composed its music) and for Mortified.

Writers for Sweet and Sour were Gooding, Pigott, Michael Cove, Paul Leadon, David Poltorak, Bert Deling, Forrest Redlich and Debra Oswald. Directors were Geoffrey Nottage, Riccardo Pellizzeri, Graham Thorburn, Posie Graeme-Evans (aka Posie Jacobs) and Helena Harris.

== Discography ==
=== Sweet and Sour – TV Soundtrack ===
Sweet and Sour – TV Soundtrack by Takeaways & Various Artists, ABC Records L-38159, Cassette C38159 © 1984.
Track listing

1. "Sweet and Sour" (Sharon O'Neill) – 3:03 Lead vocal by Deborah Conway
2. "Hip Romeo" (Jennifer Hunter-Brown aka Jennifer Jewel Brown) – 2:21 Lead vocal: Conway
3. "Moon and the Stars" (William "Billy" Miller (The Ferrets)) – 2:17 Lead vocal: Conway
4. "Chicken Feed – Part 1" (Words: Tim Gooding, Music: Martin Armiger) – 0:25 spoken by Ric Herbert and Tracy Mann
5. "Singing in the Shower" (Michael Walker, Glenn Muirhead, John Barnes) (all in Solid Citizens) – 2:43 Lead vocal: Conway.
6. "It's A Game" (Don Walker (Cold Chisel)) – 2:31 Lead vocal: Ian Moss
7. "Glam to Wham" (O'Neill) – 4:10 Lead vocal: Conway, backing vocal: Cathy McQuade
8. "Heart Plays Tricks" (Mark Callaghan (Riptides), Kay Bee aka K Bidstrup, G Bidstrup) (all in GANGgajang) – 2:47 Lead vocal: Conway
9. "On the Street Where You Live" (David McComb (The Triffids)) – 2:50 Lead vocal: McQuade
10. "Too Hot to Move" (McComb) – 4:16 Lead vocal: Conway.
11. "Little Boxes" (Words: Oswald, Music: Armiger) – 1:04 spoken by David Reyne and Megan Williams
12. "No Worries" (Reg Mombassa (Mental As Anything) as Christopher O'Doherty) – 2:20 Lead vocal: Clifforth
13. "Party On Wheels" (Chris Bailey, Callaghan, G Bidstrup) (all in GANGgajang) – 2:31 Lead vocal: Clifforth.
14. "Sweet" (Johanna Pigott, Todd Hunter) – 2:50 Lead vocal: Conway

=== Charts ===
Chart (1984)	Peak position
Australia (Kent Music Report)	4

=== Sweet and Sour Volume Two – TV Soundtrack ===
Sweet and Sour Volume Two, ABC RML 53143 © 1984. Track listing

1. "Sweet and Sour Theme Tune" (O'Neill, Armiger) – 0:57 (instrumental)
2. "No Focus" (Steve Leeson, Sally Ford) (both from the Kevins) – 2:33 Lead vocal: Conway
3. "Crocodile Shoes" (Edwards) – 3:08 Lead vocal: Mark Edwards
4. "The Kiss" (Bert Deling, Armiger, Gooding) – 1:20 spoken by Sandra Lillingston and Arky Michael
5. "Image of an Angel" (Roger Hart-Wells (Little Heroes) aka Roger Wells) – 3:05 Lead vocal: Clifforth, McQuade
6. "Down the Road" (Callaghan) – 2:41 Lead vocal: Clifforth
7. "Good Advice" (Eric McCusker) – 2:29 Lead vocal: Conway.
8. "Psychosis" (Symons) – 3:17 Lead vocal: Daniel Abineri
9. "Popstars and Politicians" (Pigott, Liz Munro aka E Kalkipsakis) – 3:01 Lead vocal: Conway
10. "Digging a Hole" (McComb) – 2:28 Lead vocal: McQuade
11. "The Rain" (Armiger) – 0:23 (instrumental)
12. "Can't Stand Still" (Armiger) – 2:00 Lead vocal: Clifforth
13. "Two of the Boys" (Armiger, Michael Cove, Gooding) – 1:12 spoken by Mann and Lillingston
14. "I'm a Genius" (Pigott, Hunter, Gooding) – 2:18 Lead vocal: Conway
15. "Bill Posters" (Armiger) – 1:07 (instrumental)
16. "Can't Imagine" (Pigott) – 2:39 Lead vocal: Conway

=== Singles ===
Year	Title	Peak chart positions
Year	Title	AUS
1984	"Sweet and Sour"	13
1984	"Glam to Wham"	85
1984	"No Focus"	-
