= Age of Reason (song) =

1988 single by John Farnham

Single by John Farnham

from the album Age of Reason
- Released: 4 July 1988
- Length: 5:08
- Label: Sony BMG, RCA, Wheatley
- Songwriter(s): Todd Hunter, Johanna Pigott
- Producer(s): Ross Fraser

John Farnham singles chronology
"Reasons" (1987)	"Age of Reason" (1988)	"Two Strong Hearts" (1988)

"Age of Reason" is a song by Australian pop rock singer John Farnham. Written by Todd Hunter and Johanna Pigott, it was released as the first single from Farnham's 1988 album of the same name. The song topped Australia's ARIA Singles Chart for four weeks and became a hit in New Zealand, where it peaked at number four. At the APRA Music Awards of 1990, the song won the Most Performed Australasian Popular Work award.

== Composition ==
"Age of Reason" was composed by Todd Hunter and partner Johanna Pigott, who had previously written the song "Rain" for Dragon and played together in the XL Capris. Pigott said, "You write songs and you're surprised at what you wrote sometimes, and you think, goodness, is that me, did I do that? It's not something you consider of perfect taste or anything, and someone records them and you think that's fantastic. It's a really exciting and thrilling thing."

== Music video ==
The music video for "Age of Reason" was filmed in 1988 and included six key scenes, with the Victorian Children's Choir in three of the sequences: running through a scrap metal yard, running down a hill behind Farnham, and standing in a warehouse as Farnham walks between them.

In the "making of" feature included on the One Voice: The Greatest Clips DVD, Farnham can be seen singing with the children after the film clip wraps shooting in the warehouse. They each received a copy of the track on vinyl.

== Track listing ==
1. "Age of Reason" (Extended mix) – 7:42
2. "Age of Reason" (album) – 5:08
3. "When the War Is Over" – 4:49

== Personnel ==
- John Farnham – vocals
- David Hirschfelder – keyboards, piano
- Brett Garsed – guitars
- Angus Burchall – drums and percussion
- Wayne Nelson – bass
- Venetta Fields – vocals
- Lindsay Field – vocals
- Thomas Metropouli – mandolin and piano accordion
- Lisa Edwards – additional vocals
- Ross Hannaford – additional vocals
- Joe Creighton – additional vocals

== Charts ==
=== Weekly charts ===
Chart (1988–1989)	Peak position
Australia (ARIA)	1
Canada Top Singles (RPM)	25
Netherlands (Dutch Top 40)	28
Netherlands (Single Top 100)	43
New Zealand (Recorded Music NZ)	4
Quebec (ADISQ)	19
South Africa (Springbok Radio)	22
UK Singles (OCC)	87
West Germany (GfK)	20
Europe (Eurochart Hot 100)	63

=== Year-end charts ===
Chart (1988)	Position
Australia (ARIA)	9
New Zealand (Recorded Music NZ)	41

== See also ==
- List of number-one singles in Australia during the 1980s
