= Reasons (John Farnham song) =

Single by John Farnham

from the album Whispering Jack
- B-side: "One Step Away"
- Released: 21 September 1987
- Recorded: AAV, 1985–1986
- Genre: Rock, pop rock
- Length: 4:23
- Label: Sony BMG
- Songwriter(s): Sam See
- Producer(s): Ross Fraser, John Farnham

John Farnham singles chronology
"A Touch of Paradise" (1987)	"Reasons" (1987)	"Age of Reason" (1988)

"Reasons" is a song written by Sam See recorded by Australian singer John Farnham. The song was released as the fourth and final single from his album Whispering Jack (1986).

== Track listing ==
1. "Reasons" - 4:23
2. "One Step Away" - 3:35

== Charts ==
Chart (1987)	Peak position
Australia (Kent Music Report)	60
