= A Touch of Paradise =

Single by John Farnham

from the album Whispering Jack
- B-side: "Help! (Live Version)"
- Released: 2 March 1987
- Recorded: 1985–1986
- Genre: Rock, pop rock
- Length: 4:45
- Label: Sony BMG
- Songwriters: Ross Wilson, Gulliver Smith, Roger McLachlan
- Producers: Ross Fraser, John Farnham

John Farnham singles chronology
"Pressure Down" (1986)	"A Touch of Paradise" (1987)	"Reasons" (1987)

"A Touch of Paradise" is a song written by Ross Wilson, Gulliver Smith and Roger McLachlan. The song was originally recorded by Mondo Rock on their album Nuovo Mondo (1982).

The song was covered by Australian singer John Farnham as well as American singer Kevin Paige. Farnham’s cover was released as the third single from his album Whispering Jack (1986). While many believe that no music video was ever made for this song, one rarely-seen video was made for its single release in late 1986.

== Track listing ==
1. "A Touch of Paradise" - 4:45
2. "Help!" (Live Version) - 4:13

== Chart history ==
Chart (1987)	Peak position
Australia (Kent Music Report)	24
New Zealand (Recorded Music NZ)	47

== Certifications ==
Certifications for "A Touch of Paradise"
Region	Certification	Certified units/sales
New Zealand (RMNZ)	Gold	15,000^{‡}
^{‡} Sales+streaming figures based on certification alone.
