= XL Capris =

Australian indie-punk band

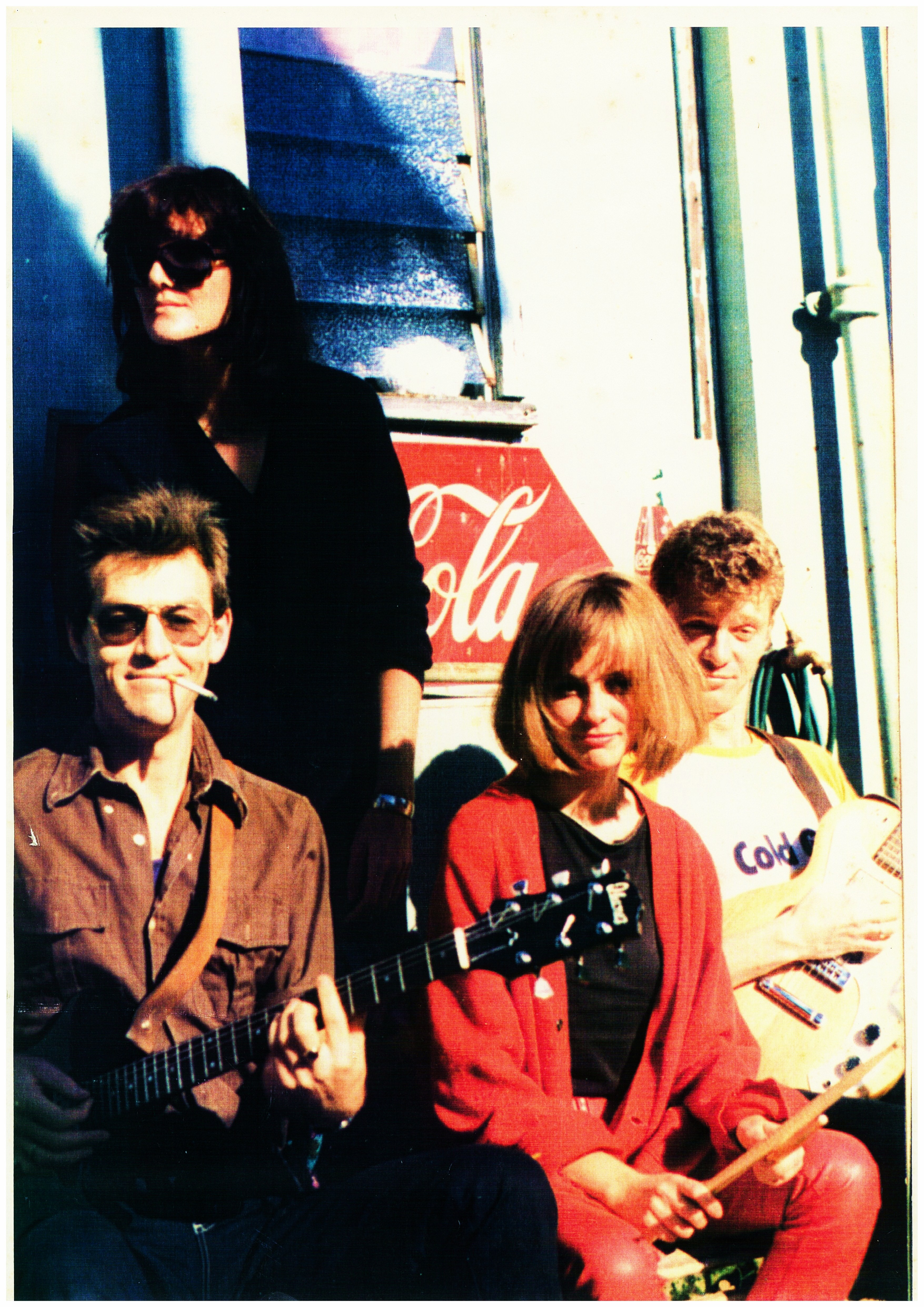
- Left to right: Kimble Rendall, Johanna Pigott, Julie Anderson and Tim Gooding in Balmain, 1979

Background information
- Origin: Sydney, New South Wales, Australia
- Genres: Punk, rock
- Years active: 1978–1982
- Label: Axle
- Spinoffs: Le Hoodoo Gurus
- Past members: Tim Gooding; Johanna Pigott; Kimble Rendall; Julie Anderson; Todd Hunter; Michael Chirnside; Michael Farmer; Barry Blackler

XL Capris were an Australian indie-punk band formed in Sydney in 1978 by Julie Anderson (aka Nancy Serapax), Tim Gooding (aka Errol Cruz), Johanna Pigott (aka Alligator Bagg), and Kimble Rendall (aka Dag Rattler).

Their best known single was a punk version of Tommy Leonetti's "My City of Sydney" (1979). This single was the only Australian disc found in legendary UK DJ John Peel's "battered wooden box" of 142 favourite records when, following his death in 2004, the contents of the box were revealed to the public in a Channel 4 television special. XL Capris made two albums, Where Is Hank? (March, 1981) and Weeds (October, 1981) both produced by Todd Hunter of New Zealand/Australian band Dragon and released on their own label Axle Records. Hunter later joined XL Capris as guitarist and subsequently married Pigott; they became a successful songwriting team: cowriting "Rain" for Dragon and "Age of Reason" for John Farnham.

Prior to forming the XL Capris, Gooding was a film and television screenwriter (The Aunty Jack Show; Wollongong The Brave/Kev Kavanagh: Beyond The Infinite; Heatwave). He and Pigott worked together creating the 1984 ABC-TV series Sweet and Sour which chronicled the activities of a fictional band, The Takeaways, and their efforts to succeed in 1980s Sydney Pop music scene.

== History ==
=== Punk rock ===
Tim Gooding and Johanna Pigott had studied Architecture during the early 1970s at the University of Sydney along with friend Angela Webber. Early practice sessions by XL Capris were held in the front room of a rented house where Gooding (and later Rendall) lived. The mattress soundproofing was not effective and the band threatened with eviction. Practice was relocated to a lightproof and airproof shed in the grounds of the infamous Cockroach Towers.

Each band member had a punk nickname: Pigott (bass, vocal, keyboard, guitar) was 'Alligator Bagg', Gooding (guitar, keyboard, vocal): 'Errol Cruz', Anderson (drum): 'Nancy Serapax' and Rendall (guitar, vocal): 'Dag Rattler'.

Their first single was a punk version of Tommy Leonetti's "My City of Sydney" (1979), arranged by Gooding. The promo video, recorded at the Sheraton Hotel in a room The Beatles had occupied during their Australian tour, featured the four band members in bed together! The single received much independent radio airplay but was not a commercial success. It is one of the 143 singles stored in a small wooden box by British DJ John Peel that is the subject of the television documentary John Peel's Record Box.

"Skylab (Son of Telstar)", written by Gooding and Rendall, received radio airplay as a tape in mid 1979. It was never released as a single and did not appear on either of the XL Capris' two albums. The song does feature on later compilation albums featuring independent bands of the period.

Their next single, "World War Three" (October 1980, produced by Hunter) was written by Pigott and Hunter. Rendall left to form Le Hoodoo Gurus in January 1981. He later became a music video director and then a second unit director for the latter two Matrix series movies. He was replaced by Hunter (guitar), Michael Chirnside (bass) joined, Anderson left to be replaced by Michael Farmer (drums). Barry Blackler (drums) also joined.

=== Where Is Hank? ===
Where Is Hank? by XL Capris

First album was Where Is Hank? (March 1981, produced by Hunter). Gooding wrote ten of the fourteen tracks including two with Pigott. 'Hank' in the title was a German shepherd owned by Rendall: "Hank went to live on a farm at Nambucca Heads". 'Tosca' was the name of their landlady's cat and it was chased up a tree by Hank, thus the album title, Where Is Hank?, is a pun on a 1980s television advertisement for a chocolate bar: 'Where's George?' The response is ... 'gone for a Tosca!'.

=== Weeds ===
Weeds by XL Capris

Second album was Weeds (October 1981, produced by Hunter). Pigott and Hunter wrote six songs including the single "Igloos" and Gooding wrote six songs. Hunter returned to Dragon (late 1981) and XL Capris dissolved in 1982. Gooding briefly joined Tactics and resumed screenwriting. He also wrote the successful country and western stage musical, King of Country.

== Poster art ==
Street poster art featuring XL Capris include: Toby Zoates' 1978 screenprint, XL Capris for the B-side of 1981 single "Red Bikini Runaway" called "K-Tel City" (Gooding) and has the band on the bonnet of a car crashing into a TV game show; and Paul Worstead's 1979 screenprints, Settlement Dance - Scarlet, XL-Capris and XL-Capris, Settlement - Beginning of School Holiday Dance.

Both album covers were created by Kent Whitmore.

== Band members ==
Lineup 1 (end 1978 – 4/1980, approx 120 gigs):

- Errol Cruz (Tim Gooding) – guitar, vocals
- Däg Rattler (Kimble Rendall) – guitar, vocals
- Alligator Bag (Johanna Pigott) – bass
- Nancy Serapax (Julie Anderson) – drums

Lineup 2 (4–11/1980, approx 60 gigs):

- Tim Gooding – guitar, vocals
- Kimble Rendall – guitar, vocals
- Todd Hunter – guitar
- Johanna Pigott – bass, vocals
- Michael Farmer – drums

Lineup 3 (11/1980 – late 1981, approx 50 gigs):

- Johanna Pigott – vocals
- Tim Gooding – guitar
- Todd Hunter – guitar
- Michael Chirnside – bass
- Michael Farmer – drums

Lineup 4 (late 1981 – 1.1.1982, approx 30 gigs):

- Johanna Pigott – vocals
- Tim Gooding – guitar
- Todd Hunter – guitar
- Michael Chirnside – bass
- Michael Farmer – drums
- Barry Blackler – drums

== Discography ==
=== Studio albums ===
List of albums, with Australian chart positions
Title	Album details	Peak chart positions
Title	Album details	AUS
Where is Hank?	Released: March 1981; Format: LP; Label: Axle Records (103LP)	89
Weeds	Released: 1981; Format: LP; Label: Axle Records (104LP)	-

=== Singles ===
Year	Title	Peak chart positions
Year	Title	AUS
1979	"My City of Sydney" / "Dead Budgies"	-
1980	"World War 3" / "Dusty"	98
1981	"Red Bikini Runaway" / "K-Tel City"	-
1981	"Igloos"/"Elevator"	-
