= Two Strong Hearts =

1988 single by John Farnham

Single by John Farnham

from the album Age of Reason
- B-side: "It's a Long Way to the Top (If You Wanna Rock 'n' Roll)"
- Released: 26 September 1988
- Length: 3:35
- Label: RCA, Sony BMG
- Songwriters: Andy Hill, Bruce Woolley
- Producers: John Farnham, Ross Fraser

John Farnham singles chronology
"Age of Reason" (1988)	"Two Strong Hearts" (1988)	"Beyond the Call" (1988)

"Two Strong Hearts" is a song written by Andy Hill and Bruce Woolley. Australian singer John Farnham recorded the song and released it as the second single from his 13th studio album, Age of Reason (1988). The song peaked at number six on the Australian ARIA Singles Chart in October 1988.
At the APRA Music Awards of 1990, the song won the Most Performed Overseas Work award.

"Two Strong Hearts" was also recorded as a duet by Johnny Mathis and Dionne Warwick on Mathis's studio album Once in a While, released in May 1988.

== Track listing ==
1. "Two Strong Hearts" – 3:35
2. "It's a Long Way to the Top (If You Wanna Rock 'n' Roll)" – 4:11

== Charts ==
=== Weekly charts ===
Chart (1988–1989)	Peak position
Australia (ARIA)	6
Canada Top Singles (RPM)	50
New Zealand (Recorded Music NZ)	28
Quebec (ADISQ)	20
UK Singles (Official Charts)	80
US Adult Contemporary (Billboard)	38

=== Year-end charts ===
Chart (1988)	Position
Australia (ARIA)	54

== Certifications ==
Certifications for "Two Strong Hearts"
Region	Certification	Certified units/sales
New Zealand (RMNZ)	Platinum	30,000^{‡}
^{‡} Sales+streaming figures based on certification alone.

== Legacy ==
In March 2026, Queensland graffiti artist James Hillier, who posts on Instagram under the name Nordacious, used a line from Two Strong Hearts which featured the words “river to the sea” and depicted a slice of watermelon. On March 28, Queensland Police stated that they asked him to remove the graffiti, because the phrase "river to the sea" had been classed as hate speech in Queensland earlier that month.
