= Whispering Jack =

Studio album by John Farnham
- Released: 20 October 1986
- Recorded: October 1985 − June 1986
- Studio: Farnham's garage (Bulleen, Victoria) / Armstrong Studios
- Genres: Pop rock; adult contemporary
- Length: 41:14
- Labels: Wheatley; Sony BMG; RCA
- Producer: Ross Fraser

John Farnham chronology
The Best of John Farnham (1980)	Whispering Jack (1986)	Age of Reason (1988)

Singles from Whispering Jack
- 1. "You're the Voice" Released: 15 September 1986; 2. "Pressure Down" Released: 1 December 1986; 3. "A Touch of Paradise" Released: 2 March 1987; 4. "Reasons" Released: 21 September 1987

Professional ratings
Review scores
Source	Rating
AllMusic	3/5 stars

Whispering Jack is the twelfth studio album by Australian adult contemporary pop singer John Farnham. It was produced by Ross Fraser and released on 20 October 1986, peaking at No. 1 on the Australian Kent Music Report albums chart. Whispering Jack became the second-best-selling album in Australia, behind only Meat Loaf's album Bat Out of Hell, and the highest-selling album in Australia by an Australian artist―24× platinum, indicating over 1.68 million copies sold; it remains the third-best-selling album of all time in Australia, as Shania Twain's Come On Over eventually eclipsed it. It spent 25 weeks at the No. 1 spot on the albums chart during 1986–1987, it was awarded the 1987 ARIA Award for Album of the Year, and it was the best-charting album for the decade of the 1980s in Australia. It was the first Australian-made album to be released on compact disc within Australia. One of Farnham's biggest hits, "You're the Voice", was issued as the lead single from the album and peaked at No. 1 on the Kent Music Report singles chart.

Prior to this album, Farnham's career had stalled after being recruited and then leaving as lead singer of Little River Band. Farnham's manager, Glenn Wheatley, mortgaged his home to raise funds for the recording of this album. After initial reluctance by major Australian radio stations to play the lead single, "You're the Voice", public demand became overwhelming and they relented. The song became one of the standout number-one songs on the Australian charts of the 1980s and still remains a staple of Australian radio. Whispering Jack restarted Farnham's career, which sustained across two more decades. On 21 November 2006, Whispering Jack was re-released to celebrate its 20th anniversary, which came with a bonus track, an extended studio version of "Pressure Down", and with a DVD of the edited 1987 Whispering Jack Live in Concert televised performance.

== Background ==
John Farnham had been a teen pop idol during the late 1960s and 1970s billed then as "Johnny". He met Glenn Wheatley, who was bass guitarist of rock group The Masters Apprentices, when both acts were managed by Darryl Sambell. From the mid-1970s, Farnham had moved into television, stage and cabaret entertainment. Wheatley, who was already managing Little River Band (LRB), signed Farnham to his company in 1980. They decided Farnham's comeback single would be a reworking of the Beatles' "Help!", which was produced by LRB's Graeham Goble, it peaked at No. 8 on the Australian Kent Music Report singles chart. Farnham was utilising a more adult contemporary pop style and the associated album, Uncovered, was also produced by Goble, which peaked at No. 20 on the Kent Music Report albums chart. The B-side of "Help" was Farnham's songwriting effort, "Jillie's Song", co-written with Goble. In recording the album, Farnham's studio band included guitarist Tommy Emmanuel (ex-Southern Star Band), keyboardist Mal Logan (ex-Renée Geyer Band, LRB), drummer Derek Pellicci (LRB) and bass guitarist Barry Sullivan (ex-Chain). They became his tour band until Logan and Pellicci returned to their LRB commitments and were replaced by Sam McNally and David Jones respectively. Three other solo singles followed in 1981 but none charted in the top 50. In February 1982, after Glenn Shorrock had departed Little River Band, Farnham became their lead vocalist with recommendations by Goble and Wheatley.

In 1985, Farnham had started collecting a song list for a future solo album while still in Little River Band, and after he finished his vocals for their album, No Reins, he left the band late that year. Farnham's first solo performances since 1981 were live shows with the John Farnham Band consisting of Brett Garsed on lead guitar, Sam See on guitar and Derek Pellicci, formerly of Little River Band, on drums. In early 1986, sound engineer Ross Fraser suggested to Wheatley that it was time to start working on the solo album. Wheatley searched in vain for a producer and record label willing to work with Farnham, so Fraser took on the producer role and Wheatley provided financial support.

Whilst visiting a jazz club in the US, Farnham was mistakenly introduced as Jack Phantom, and when he subsequently provided a running commentary for a local pool game he named himself Whispering Jack Phantom after the Pot Black commentator 'Whispering' Ted Lowe. Farnham's work for the album, Whispering Jack, included expanding his song list with Fraser's advice. "A Touch of Paradise" was co-written by Gulliver Smith of Company Caine and Mondo Rock's Ross Wilson, while "Pressure Down" was provided by Harry Bogdanovs. Two weeks before the album was due to be recorded a demo tape arrived from London with similar material to "Pressure Down"; Farnham and Fraser listened to the demo of "You're the Voice" and knew they had found a once-in-a-lifetime song. Another song on offer was "We Built This City" but Farnham knocked it back; it was later recorded by US band Starship.

== Recording ==
Recording began in October 1985 in the suburban garage of Farnham's house on Manningham road in Bulleen, Victoria. The recording's $150,000 cost was financed by the remortgaging of Glenn Wheatley's house. In addition to traditional instrumentation, the album relied heavily on sampling. The drum sounds on "You're the Voice" were sampled from a slamming car door played via the Fairlight CMI. Armstrong Studios in South Melbourne were then later used to complete the album.

== Reception ==
Initially, public interest in the re-branded former teen idol was difficult to cultivate, and many radio stations refused to play Farnham's album. Things, however, started to change. Sydney radio station 2SM, Melbourne stations 3Eon FM and 3XY were among the first to start playing the song and soon after Sydney station 2Day FM also started playing its first single, "You're the Voice", which was released on the 15th of September 1986.

Henceforth, other radio stations nationwide began receiving requests for the song. Its television debut was on Hey Hey It's Saturday with Skyhooks' Greg Macainsh providing bass guitar. "You're the Voice" peaked at No. 1 in Sweden and Australia, as well as being a top-ten hit in some European countries: No. 3 in Switzerland, No. 6 in the UK, and No. 6 in Austria. The song was written by Andy Qunta (Icehouse), Keith Reid (Procol Harum), Maggie Ryder and Chris Thompson (ex-Manfred Mann's Earth Band).

Whispering Jack, released in October, became the highest-selling album by an Australian act in Australia, and peaked at No. 1 on the Australian Kent Music Report albums chart for a total of 25 weeks. As of 2006, it was 24× platinum, indicating sales of over 1.68 million units in Australia alone. The album was released internationally on RCA/BMG and peaked at No. 1 in Sweden, No. 3 in Austria, the top 20 in Norway, and No. 35 in the UK. In August 1988 it returned to the Australian top ten. Other Australian singles were December's "Pressure Down", which peaked at No. 4, March 1987's "A Touch of Paradise" and September's "Reasons".

Farnham followed with the Jack's Back Tour; an initial itinerary of eleven performances was thought to be enough considering they were up against tours by Michael Jackson and Billy Joel, but after high ticket sales, it was extended by eight more shows and use of larger venues. At that time, Jack's Back Tour was the highest-grossing tour by an Australian act. John Farnham Band now consisted of Brett Garsed on lead guitar, David Hirschfelder on keyboards (ex-Little River Band), Macainsh on bass and Angus Burchill on drums. Farnham won six of the inaugural 1987 ARIA Music Awards for Album of the Year, Single of the Year, Highest Selling Album, Highest Selling Single, Best Male Artist and Best Adult Contemporary Album. On 19 July 1987, TV series Countdown broadcast its last show, the 1986 Countdown Music and Video Awards with Farnham winning the Best Album Award for Whispering Jack. In October 2010, Whispering Jack (1986) was listed in the book, 100 Best Australian Albums. In December 2021, the album was listed at number three in Rolling Stone Australia's '200 Greatest Albums of All Time' countdown.

In 2011, Farnham announced a national tour to celebrate the 25th anniversary of Whispering Jack, including the album being performed in its entirety in track order.

== Track listing ==
1. "Pressure Down" (Harry Bogdanovs) – 3:50
2. "You're the Voice" (Andy Qunta, Keith Reid, Maggie Ryder, Chris Thompson) – 5:04
3. "One Step Away" (Jon Kennett, Dave Skinner) – 3:36
4. "Reasons" (Sam See) – 4:26
5. "Going, Going, Gone" (John Farnham, David Hirschfelder, Ross Fraser) – 3:33
6. "No One Comes Close" (Eric McCusker) – 4:09
7. "Love to Shine" (Bogdanovs, Kiki Dee) – 4:01
8. "Trouble" (Dennis East) – 3:25
9. "A Touch of Paradise" (Ross Wilson, Gulliver Smith) – 4:48
10. "Let Me Out" (Farnham) – 4:22

=== Alternate track listing ===
1. "Pressure Down (remix)" (Bogdanovs) – 3:45
2. "You're the Voice (remix)" (Qunta, Reid, Ryder, Thompson) – 5:35
3. "A Touch of Paradise (remix)" (Wilson, Smith) – 4:39
4. "One Step Away" (Kennett, Skinner) – 3:36
5. "Reasons" (See) – 4:26
6. "No One Comes Close" (McCusker) – 4:09
7. "Love to Shine" (Bogdanovs, Dee) – 4:01
8. "Trouble" (East) – 3:25
9. "Let Me Out" (Farnham) – 4:22
10. "Going, Going, Gone" (Farnham, Hirschfelder, Fraser) – 3:33

=== Whispering Jack Live ===
Following the initial success of the album, a series of concerts was performed around Australia in 1987. One such performance was recorded at the Melbourne Sports and Entertainment Centre, and broadcast on Network Ten. A full version of the concert was also released to video in the same year.

1. "Pressure Down" (Bogdanovs)
2. "One Step Away" (Kennett, Skinner)
3. "Going, Going, Gone" (Farnham, Hirschfelder, Fraser)
4. "Paper Paradise" (Hirschfelder, Nelson)
5. "Infatuation" (Brady, Goble)
6. "Let Me Out" (Farnham)
7. "A Touch of Paradise" (Wilson, Smith)
8. "When the War Is Over" (Prestwich)
9. "Comic Conversations" (Bromley)
10. "All in Love Is Fair" (Stevie Wonder)
11. "Amazing Grace" (Traditional)
12. "Reasons" (See)
13. "No One Comes Close" (McCusker)
14. "Trouble" (East)
15. "Love to Shine" (Bogdanovs, Dee)
16. "Playing to Win" (Farnham, Goble, Hirschfelder, Housden, Proffer, Nelson, Prestwich)
17. "One" (Nilsson)
18. "Down on the Border (Goble)
19. "Help" (Lennon, McCartney)
20. "You're the Voice" (Qunta, Reid, Ryder, Thompson)

=== 20th anniversary edition ===
Disc one (CD)

1. "Pressure Down" (Bogdanovs) – 3:50
2. "You're the Voice" (Qunta, Reid, Ryder, Thompson) – 5:04
3. "One Step Away" (Kennett, Skinner) – 3:36
4. "Reasons" (See) – 4:26
5. "Going, Going, Gone" (Farnham, Hirschfelder, Fraser) – 3:33
6. "No One Comes Close" (McCusker) – 4:09
7. "Love to Shine" (Bogdanovs, Dee) – 4:01
8. "Trouble" (East) – 3:25
9. "A Touch of Paradise" (Wilson, Smith) – 4:48
10. "Let Me Out" (Farnham) – 4:22
11. "Pressure Down" extended version (Bogdanovs) – 5:55

Disc two ("Whispering Jack Live in Concert" DVD) (Note: The DVD used the edited version originally broadcast on television in 1987, minus "Paper Paradise".)

1. "Pressure Down" (Bogdanovs) – 4:19
2. "One Step Away" (Kennett, Skinner) – 3:35
3. "Going, Going, Gone" (Farnham, Hirschfelder, Fraser) – 3:47
4. "Let Me Out" (Farnham) – 4:21
5. "A Touch of Paradise" (Wilson, Smith) – 5:29
6. "When the War Is Over" (Steve Prestwich) – 5:33
7. "Amazing Grace" (Traditional) – 4:39
8. "Reasons" (See) – 5:14
9. "No One Comes Close" (McCusker) – 4:26
10. "Love to Shine" (Bogdanovs, Dee) – 4:23
11. "One" (H Nilsson) – 5:47
12. "Playing to Win" (Graham Goble, Farnham, Hirschfelder, Stephen Housden, Spencer Proffer, Wayne Nelson, Prestwich) – 3:08
13. "Help!" (John Lennon, Paul McCartney) – 4:58
14. "You're the Voice" (Qunta, Reid, Ryder, Thompson) – 6:13
15. "Credits" – 2:06

== Personnel ==
=== John Farnham band ===
- John Farnham – vocals, drum machine, percussion (credited as Whispering Jack)
- Brett Garsed – guitars
- David Hirschfelder – keyboards, drum machine, percussion
- Roger McLachlan – bass guitar

=== Additional musicians ===
- Rozzi Bazzani – backing vocals
- Sandy Weeks – backing vocals
- Helen Cornish – backing vocals
- Penny Dyer – backing vocals
- Colin Setches – backing vocals
- Mal Stainton – backing vocals
- Nikki Nicholls – backing vocals
- Ross Fraser – drum machine, percussion
- Wickow – percussion
- Dougie – low moans

=== Production ===
- Ross Fraser – producer
- Doug Brady – recording and mix engineer
- Michael Wickow – assistant engineer
- Don Bartley – original 1986 mastering engineer
- Martin Pullan – 2006 remastering engineer

== Chart positions ==
=== Weekly charts ===
Weekly chart performance for Whispering Jack
Chart (1986–1989)	Peak position
Australian Albums (Kent Music Report)	1
Canada Top Albums (RPM)	36
German Albums (Offizielle Top 100)	4
Dutch Albums (Album Top 100)	32
New Zealand Albums (RMNZ)	2
Norwegian Albums (VG-lista)	12
Swedish Albums (Sverigetopplistan)	1
Swiss Albums (Schweizer Hitparade)	3
UK Albums (Official Charts)	35
European Albums (Eurotipsheet)	22

=== Year-end charts ===
1987 year-end chart performance for Whispering Jack
Chart (1987)	Position
Australian Albums (Kent Music Report)	1
New Zealand Albums (RMNZ)	5

1988 year-end chart performance for Whispering Jack
Chart (1988)	Position
Australian Albums (ARIA)	10

== Certifications and sales ==
Certifications and sales for Whispering Jack
Region	Certification	Certified units/sales
Australia (ARIA)	24× Platinum	1,730,000
Canada (Music Canada)	Gold	50,000^{^}
Germany (BVMI)	Gold	250,000^{^}
New Zealand (RMNZ)	Platinum	15,000^{^}
Sweden (GLF)	Platinum	100,000^{^}
Summaries
Worldwide 1986 and 1987 sales	—	2,000,000
^{^} Shipments figures based on certification alone.

== See also ==
- List of best-selling albums in Australia
- List of Top 25 albums for 1987 in Australia
- List of Top 25 albums for 1988 in Australia
- List of number-one albums in Australia during the 1980s
