= Chain Reaction (John Farnham song) =

1990 single by John Farnham

Single by John Farnham

from the album Chain Reaction
- Released: 6 August 1990
- Length: 3:12
- Label: RCA, Wheatley, BMG Arista/Ariola
- Songwriter(s): David A. Stewart, Siobhan Fahey
- Producer(s): Ross Fraser

John Farnham singles chronology
"Communication" (1989)	"Chain Reaction" (1990)	"That's Freedom" (1990)

"Chain Reaction" is a song by Australian pop rock singer John Farnham. It was released as the lead single from his 14th studio album, Chain Reaction, in August 1990 . The song peaked at number six on the Australian Singles Chart and was certified gold by the Australian Recording Industry Association (ARIA). At the 1991 Logie Awards, the music video won Most Popular Music Video.

== Track listings ==
Australian CD and 7-inch single

1. "Chain Reaction" – 3:12
2. "In Your Hands" – 4:19

12-inch single

1. "Chain Reaction" (Tex mix) – 6:07
2. "In Days to Come" – 4:01
3. "Chain Reaction" (radio mix) – 3:12

== Charts ==
=== Weekly charts ===
Chart (1990)	Peak position
Australia (ARIA)	6
Netherlands (Single Top 100) with "In Days to Come"	79
New Zealand (Recorded Music NZ)	21

=== Year-end charts ===
Chart (1990)	Position
Australia (ARIA)	44

== Certifications ==
Region	Certification	Certified units/sales
Australia (ARIA)	Gold	35,000^{^}
^{^} Shipments figures based on certification alone.
