= That's Freedom =

1987 song by American singer-songwriter Tom Kimmel

Single by Tom Kimmel

from the album 5 to 1
- Released: 1987
- Songwriters: Tom Kimmel; Jean Anne Chapman

"That's Freedom" is a song written and performed by American singer-songwriter, Tom Kimmel. It was taken from his debut studio album, 5 to 1 and reached number 64 on the US Billboard Hot 100 in July 1987.

== John Farnham version ==
"That's Freedom"

Single by John Farnham

from the album Chain Reaction
- Released: September 17, 1990
- Length: 4:16
- Label: RCA, Wheatley, BMG
- Songwriter: Tom Kimmel
- Producer: Ross Fraser

John Farnham singles chronology
"Chain Reaction" (1990)	"That's Freedom" (1990)	"Burn for You" (1990)

In 1990, Australian pop rock singer John Farnham recorded a version of "That's Freedom". It was released in September 1990 as the second single from his 14th studio album Chain Reaction. The song peaked at number six on the Australian Singles Chart. At the ARIA Music Awards of 1991, the song was nominated for Single of the Year.

Live versions of Farnham performing "That's Freedom" have subsequently been released on the albums Full House and Live at the Regent Theatre – 1st July 1999.

=== Track listings ===
Australian CD and 7-inch single

1. "That's Freedom" (7-inch version) – 4:16
2. "New Day" – 4:14

German 12-inch single

1. "That's Freedom" (club mix) – 7:36
2. "In Your Hands" – 4:19
3. "That's Freedom" (7-inch version) – 4:16

=== Charts ===
==== Weekly charts ====
Chart (1990–1991)	Peak position
Australia (ARIA)	6
Canada Top Singles (RPM)	22
European Airplay (European Hit Radio)	41
Germany (GfK)	56
Netherlands (Single Top 100)	52
Quebec (ADISQ)	27

==== Year-end charts ====
Chart (1990)	Position
Australia (ARIA)	70

=== Certifications ===
Region	Certification	Certified units/sales
Australia (ARIA)	Gold	35,000^{^}
^{^} Shipments figures based on certification alone.
