= Pressure Down =

Single by John Farnham

from the album Whispering Jack
- B-side: "Let Me Out"
- Released: 1 December 1986
- Recorded: 1985–1986
- Genre: Rock, pop rock
- Length: 3:45
- Label: Wheatley Records
- Songwriter: Harry Bogdanovs
- Producer: Ross Fraser

John Farnham singles chronology
"You're the Voice" (1986)	"Pressure Down" (1986)	"A Touch of Paradise" (1987)

"Pressure Down" is a song written by Harry Bogdanovs, recorded by Australian singer John Farnham. The song was released as the second single from his 1986 album Whispering Jack.

== Reception ==
Cash Box magazine called it "A summer's breeze of a pop tune, with razor-sharp production."

== Charts ==
=== Weekly charts ===
Weekly chart performance for "Pressure Down"
Chart (1986–87)	Peak position
Australia (Kent Music Report)	4
Canada Top Singles (RPM)	70
Netherlands (Single Top 100)	99
New Zealand (Recorded Music NZ)	8
Quebec (ADISQ)	19
Sweden (Sverigetopplistan)	11
UK Singles (Official Charts)	78
West Germany (GfK)	32

=== Year-end charts ===
Year-end chart performance for "Pressure Down"
Chart (1987)	Position
Australia (Australian Music Report)	16
New Zealand (Recorded Music NZ)	49

== Certifications ==
Certifications for "Pressure Down"
Region	Certification	Certified units/sales
New Zealand (RMNZ)	Platinum	30,000^{‡}
^{‡} Sales+streaming figures based on certification alone.
