= Burn for You (John Farnham song) =

1990 single by John Farnham

Single by John Farnham

from the album Chain Reaction
- B-side: "Chains Around the Heart"; "The Time Has Come"
- Released: 12 November 1990
- Length: 3:45
- Label: RCA, Wheatley, Sony BMG
- Songwriters: Ross Fraser, John Farnham, Phil Buckle
- Producer: Ross Fraser

John Farnham singles chronology
"That's Freedom" (1990)	"Burn for You" (1990)	"In Days to Come" (1991)

"Burn for You" is a song by Australian pop rock singer John Farnham. It was released in November 1990 as the third single from his 14th studio album, Chain Reaction. The song peaked at number five on the Australian Singles Chart. At the ARIA Music Awards of 1991, it won the Song of the Year. B-side "Chains Around the Heart" was later recorded by Richard Marx under the title "Chains Around My Heart".

== Track listings ==
- Australian CD and 7-inch single
1. "Burn for You" (Ross Fraser, John Farnham, Phil Buckle) - 3:45
2. "Chains Around the Heart" (Richard Marx, Fee Waybill) - 6:36
- 12-inch single
1. "Burn for You" (Buckle, Fraser, Farnham) - 3:45
2. "The Time Has Come" (James Creighton, Farnham, Fraser) - 4:55
3. "Chains Around the Heart" (Richard Marx, Fee Waybill) - 6:36

== Charts ==
=== Weekly charts ===
Chart (1990–1991)	Peak position
Australia (ARIA)	5
UK Airplay (Music Week)	55

=== Year-end charts ===
Chart (1990)	Position
Australia (ARIA)	82

== Certifications ==
Region	Certification	Certified units/sales
Australia (ARIA)	Gold	35,000^{^}
^{^} Shipments figures based on certification alone.
