= Johanna Pigott =

Australian musician

- Born: Johanna Paton Pigott ca. 1955 (age 70–71); Sydney, New South Wales, Australia
- Other name: "Alligator Bagg"
- Education: Presbyterian Ladies' College, Sydney; University of Sydney
- Occupations: Musician, singer-songwriter, screenwriter
- Partner: Todd Hunter

Johanna Paton Pigott (born ca. 1955) is an Australian musician, singer-songwriter and screenwriter. Her best known hit songs are Dragon's "Rain" which peaked at No. 2 on the Australian Kent Music Report Singles Chart in 1983, and John Farnham's "Age of Reason". "Rain" was co-written with her partner, Dragon's Todd Hunter, and his younger brother, Marc Hunter. When "Age of Reason" reached the top of the charts in July 1988, Pigott became the first Australian woman to have written a No. 1 hit. It was co-written with Todd Hunter.

Scripts by Pigott for TV include Sweet and Sour (created with Tim Gooding), Heartbreak High (for which she also co-wrote the theme music and other songs with Hunter) and Mortified (created by Angela Webber). Film scripts she has written include those for Broken English (co-written with Gregor Nicholas and James Salter) and Alex (featuring original music she co-wrote with Hunter, and for which she performed lead vocals on the soundtrack).

== Early life ==
Pigott was educated at the Presbyterian Ladies' College, Sydney in Croydon, together with schoolmate Angela Webber. Following matriculation from high school in the 1970s, Pigott studied architecture at the University of Sydney.

== Bands ==
=== XL Capris ===
XL Capris was an indie-punk band formed by Pigott in 1978, for whom she performed bass guitar, vocals, keyboards and guitar whilst also going by the stage name 'Alligator Bagg'. The band's other members included Tim Gooding (guitar, vocal) aka 'Errol Cruz', Julie Anderson (drums) aka 'Nancy Serapax' and Kimble Rendall (guitar, vocal) aka 'Dag Rattler'. The group's early practice sessions were in the front room of a Birchgrove house where Gooding (and later Rendall) lived. Their first single was a punk version of Tommy Leonetti's "My City of Sydney" (1979), which had a promo video showing the four band members in bed together and Pigott performing lead vocals and bass guitar. The single received some radio airplay but was not a commercial success. XL Capris' second single "Skylab (Son of Telstar)", released later that same year, was written by Rendall but had even less success.

Their next single, "World War Three" (October 1980), was produced by Todd Hunter and co-written by Pigott and Hunter. Rendall thereafter left the band to form Le Hoodoo Gurus, before ultimately becoming a music video director and then a second unit director for the latter two Matrix series movies. He was replaced on guitar by Hunter. Michael Churnside (bass) also joined the group, and when Anderson left she was replaced on drums by Barry Blackler. Michael Farmer would also go on to drum for XL Capris following Blackler's departure.

The band's first album was Where's Hank? (March 1981, produced by Hunter). Gooding wrote ten songs for the record, including two with Pigott: "Red Bikini Runaway" (single, April 1981) and "Hi Rise Heart". Pigott also wrote "Evelyn". 'Hank' was a German shepherd owned by Rendall which "went to live on a farm at Nambucca Heads". Based on Rendall's and Pigott's recollections, the album title Where's Hank? was a pun based on a 1980s TV commercial for a Rowntree's chocolate bar in which the question is asked, 'Where's George?' with the response being, 'Gone for a Tosca!'

For the band's second album, Weeds, (October 1981, produced by Hunter) Pigott and Hunter co-wrote six songs including the single "Igloos",. Pigott also wrote "Please Excuse Me" and Gooding wrote a further six songs. Hunter returned to Dragon late in 1981 and XL Capris dissolved in 1982.

Street poster art featuring XL Capris include: Toby Zoates' 1978 screenprint, XL Capris for the B-side of their 1981 single "Red Bikini Runaway" called "K-Tel City" and features the band on the bonnet of a car crashing into a TV game show; and Paul Worstead's 1979 screen prints, Settlement Dance – Scarlet, XL-Capris and XL-Capris, Settlement – Beginning of School Holiday Dance.

=== Sardine v and Scribble ===
Pigott briefly joined Sardine v on bass guitar in 1982. The video for their single "Sudan" shows Pigott heavily disguised in a burqa-like black costume strumming bass to Stephanie Rilen's plaintive vocals and Ian Rilen's guitar.

Scribble (1983–1987) was a post punk synth pop band based around Pigott (vocals, guitar, keyboard) with session musicians and band members including Hunter, Mark Bell, Lee Borkman, Mike Caen, Bill Heckenberg, Geoff Lungren and Tim Powles. They released Scribble (a seven-track mini-LP) in 1983 including the double A-side single "Silly Girl" (written by Pigott) / "Mr Calico" (co-written by Pigott and Hunter). The video for "Silly Girl" showed a wistful Pigott singing and playing guitar. "Adaptability" aka "Cartoon Connection (theme)" (co-written by Pigott, Hunter and Gooding) was a 1984 single. Scribble's two albums were So Far 1983–1985 (1985) and Pop Art (1986), which had ten tracks, including singles "Sunday School", "Don't Give Your Heart Away" and "Alligator" (all co-written by Pigott and Hunter). "Alligator" (a reference to Pigott's nickname from XL Capris) was later performed by Fleur Beaupert during season six of Heartbreak High in episodes No. 133 and No. 145. The Pop Art cover depicts a stylised version of Pigott. Although achieving some cult interest, there was little commercial success for Scribble.

== Solo and with Genni Kane ==
In 1984, Pigott and Hunter wrote Pigott's "Turn It Up" on various artists' album The Nine O'Clock Muse. In 1993, Genni Kane (of the Flying Emus) and Pigott released "Starlight Hotel" (co-written by Kane, Pigott, John Kane and Hunter) as a CD single. In 2005, Pigott sang a verse of "ComeDown" by KingJustice on their album What the World Needs Now.

== Songwriter ==
=== Dragon ===
During 1983, Pigott and Hunter co-wrote Dragon's comeback hit single "Rain". Pigott remembers, "I went from a little underground band to finding myself up the back of the Entertainment Centre hearing 10,000 people sing the chorus of my song." The song reached No. 2 on the singles chart, only being blocked from the top spot by Austen Tayshus's No. 1 novelty hit "Australiana". Pigott later sang "Rain" with Rockmelons on their 1992 album Form 1 Planet with Hunter and Rockmelons' Bryon Jones providing backing vocals. Hunter and Pigott co-wrote other Dragon songs including "Cry", and Pigott was a session musician on Dragon's 1989 album, Bondi Road. When the band re-formed in 2006, Dragon performed acoustic versions of their earlier work including "Rain".

=== John Farnham ===
John Farnham had asked Hunter and Pigott to write him a song, and they provided him with number-one hit single, "Age of Reason" (which reached the top of the charts on 30 July 1988 and remained there for four weeks). The album from which the single came, also called Age of Reason, debuted at number one as well in July, 1988. The demo version of the track had been recorded with Todd's brother Marc Hunter singing lead. In achieving this milestone with the single, Pigott became the first Australian woman to write an Australian number one hit.

=== Keith Urban ===
In 1990, Hunter and Pigott wrote Keith Urban's first single "Only You", which also appeared on his first album, Keith Urban.

== Screenwriter and songwriter ==
=== TV series ===
During 1983–1984 Pigott and Gooding created the ABC TV series Sweet and Sour (1984), they also wrote episodes. Shared experiences in the music industry lent authenticity to their scripts. Pigott also wrote (or co-wrote) four songs for the two soundtrack albums.

The theme song for TV series, Heartbreak High (1994–1999) written by Hunter and Pigott was nominated for the 1994 Australasian Performing Right Association (APRA) 'Television Theme of the Year' award. Hunter was the composer for the series and, with Pigott, wrote over 20 songs for the series (mostly performed by Abi Tucker, Fleur Beaupert or themselves). Pigott also wrote episode scripts. Episode No. 61 featured six songs written by Hunter and Pigott: "Down to the River", "Rest in Peace" and "Second Chance" performed by Tucker and Terry Serio; and "You've Changed", "Only You" and "Whatever I Had with You" by Tucker alone. Hunter and Pigott performed their own songs: "I'll Be There" in episode No. 70, "Gravity and Psyche" No. 92, "Love Is Here to Stay" No. 125.

In 1995 a combined American Broadcasting Company and Australian Broadcasting Corporation production, ABC's World Of Discovery: Australia's Outback: The Vanishing Frontier, featured music by Pigott, Hunter, Stacey Widelitz and Lee Holdridge.

During 2006–2007, TV series, Mortified episodes No. 1.7 Flag Fall and No. 1.12 Being Me were written by Pigott. Her close friend and former schoolmate, Angela Webber, had created the TV series and Gooding also wrote scripts for some episodes.

In 2008, Pigott co-wrote the Title Theme (with Hunter) of the new BBC/Southern Star TV Serial Out of the Blue.

=== Films ===
The Girl Who Came Late aka Daydream Believer (1991) had original music by Hunter and Pigott. Pigott performed "I'll Stand by You" for the soundtrack and, with Hunter, wrote: "The Love Theme", "The Polo Factor" and "Nell Rides Out" for the film score. "Daydream Believer is their first major feature film as composers". End titles song performed by Sam Brown, "With You" (Hunter, Pigott, Brown) involved exchanges of tapes and long-distance phone calls.

Alex aka Alex: The Spirit of a Champion (1993) had original music by Hunter and Pigott. "Alex (theme)" aka "Aotearoa" written by Hunter and "For The Rest Of My Life'" by Hunter and Pigott. Broken English (1996) was co-written by Pigott with director Gregor Nicholas and James Salter. The New Zealand film won six awards and is a Romeo and Juliet for Māori Eddie, and an immigrant Croatian Nina.

== See also ==
- List of Old Girls of PLC Sydney
