= Todd Hunter =

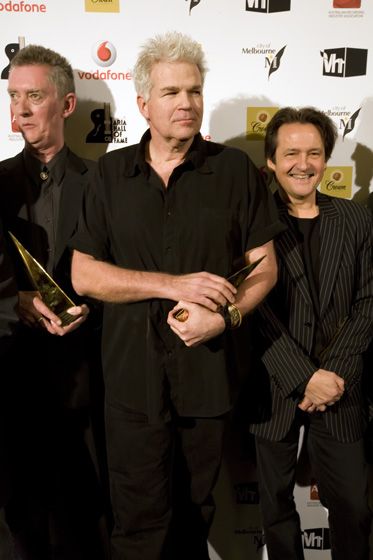
- Hunter with Dragon at the ARIA Hall of Fame on 1 July 2008

Background information
- Born: Todd Stuart Hunter; 22 June 1951 (age 75); Waitara, New Zealand
- Occupations: Musician, composer, manager, producer
- Website: dragononline.com.au

Todd Stuart Hunter (born 22 June 1951) is a New Zealand musician and composer known for his involvement in the band Dragon. Their best known songs are "April Sun in Cuba", "Are You Old Enough?", "Still in Love With You", and "Rain". Hunter also composed John Farnham's hit song "Age of Reason" with Johanna Pigott and music for film Daydream Believer (1991) and TV series Heartbreak High (1994–1999).

On 1 July 2008 the Australian Recording Industry Association (ARIA) recognised Dragon's iconic status when they were inducted into their Hall of Fame.

== Biography ==
=== Dragon - 1970s ===
Hunter (bass guitar, vocals) formed Dragon in 1972 with Graeme Collins (piano, vocals), Neil Storey (drums) and Ray Goodwin (guitar, keyboards, vocals); the group was soon joined by Hunter's younger brother Marc Hunter (vocals) and moved to Australia in 1975. The band toured Australasia, America and Europe and their songs from that time, "April Sun in Cuba", "Are You Old Enough?" and "Still in Love With You" are still played on radio.

=== Jen Brown ===
Hunter's first wife was poet, artist, writer Jen Jewel Brown (aka Jennifer Hunter Brown) who had written Million Dollar Riff (1975) a book describing Australian band Skyhooks prior to their first tour of US. Hunter and Brown co-wrote "Politics" and "Company" for Dragon's album O Zambezi (1978). Brown introduced Hunter to violinist Richard Lee who then played violin on "Civilization" for O Zambezi as a session musician before joining Dragon in February 1979. Follow up album Power Play (1979) had disappointing sales by comparison, and despite Dragon having sold over a million records in the 1970s, they first broke up on New Year's Eve of 1979.

=== Johanna Pigott ===
After the first demise of Dragon, Hunter became a record producer for bands including the New Zealand punk group Toy Love. He produced two albums for XL Capris, a Sydney-based punk band, which included vocalist & bass guitarist Johanna Pigott. She and Hunter became domestic partners and in 1981 he joined the band as guitar player. When that group disbanded in 1982, Hunter joined Pigott in her next group, Scribble from 1983 to 1986.

=== Dragon - 1980s ===
When Dragon reformed in 1982, Hunter and Pigott co-wrote the song "Rain", which went to #2 in 1983.

Around this time Hunter (usually with Pigott) became involved with film and TV scoring and found that he was far more suited to the discipline of working in a studio to a deadline than playing in a live band. Pigott (co-creator, screenwriter and performer) and Hunter (guitarist and songwriter) were involved in Australian ABC-TV series Sweet and Sour (1984). Hunter's first wife, Jen Brown also wrote "Hip Romeo" for Sweet and Sour.

Nevertheless, Dragon toured Europe with Tina Turner in 1986–1987 promoting the Dreams of Ordinary Men album produced by Todd Rundgren. At that time the band consisted of Marc Hunter (lead vocal), Hunter on bass, guitar player Tommy Emmanuel, Alan Mansfield from Robert Palmer's band on keyboards and Doane Perry from Jethro Tull on drums.

On that tour Hunter hauled a large road case containing a portable studio through Europe and on it he wrote and recorded the scores for many imaginary movies. It was on that same Box that the Dragon hit single "Celebration" was recorded in hotel rooms around the world with David Hirschfelder producing. In 1987 while on tour (Dragon was briefly called Hunter) with Turner, John Farnham asked Hunter and Pigott to write a song for his next album. They wrote "Age of Reason", which went to #1 in Australia for four weeks from 30 July and was a top 10 hit in Germany and Canada in 1989. "Age of Reason" won the APRA 'Most Performed Australasian Popular Song' of the year award for 1989. After selling another million records worldwide in the 1980s Dragon disbanded again in 1995.

=== Film and TV scoring ===
From 1994 to 1999 Hunter was the composer for the hit TV Series Heartbreak High and wrote and recorded the 7500 cues that underscored the series. The theme song was nominated for 1994 APRA Television Theme of the Year. Hunter and Pigott also wrote over 20 songs for the series (mostly performed by Abi Tucker, Fleur Beaupert or themselves). Other TV series Hunter worked on included Headstart and Out There.

Hunter and Pigott composed music for the film The Girl Who Came Late, also known as Daydream Believer (1991), and Alex aka Alex: The Spirit of a Champion (1993). "Alex (theme)" aka "Aotearoa" was written by Hunter and "For the Rest of My Life" by Hunter and Pigott.

In 2008 Hunter worked on the BBC/Southern Star TV serial 'Out of the Blue' with composer Stephen Rae and composed the music for the series Pride of Australia in 2009.

=== Dragon - 2000s ===
In 2006 Todd Hunter reformed Dragon with Mark Williams, Bruce Reid and Pete Drummond; they recorded Sunshine to Rain for Liberation Blue Records. Dragon toured Australia to promote their 2008 CD Dragon Remembers which was an affectionate look at great Australian Anthems recorded by friends and colleagues no longer with us. Dragon were inducted into the ARIA Hall of Fame on 1 July 2008, Hunter stated that they had switched from acoustic performances to fully electric because fans were singing so loud the band could not be heard. In 2010 Dragon released the first studio album of new songs for 20 years entitled "Happy I Am" followed by the EP "Chase The Sun" in 2011 and the EP "The Great Divide" in 2012. Dragon have played over 500 shows since the reformation. The band played the "Long Way to the Top" series of concerts in October 2012 then embarked on a 16 date "40th Anniversary National Tour" of New Zealand in mid October. To mark the occasion Liberation Records released "The Dragon Years" a 40-song compilation CD. Dragon played 20 shows on The Red Hot Summer Tour around Australia in early 2013 and kicked off their 40th Anniversary Concert Series at The Sydney Opera House in April 2013. As of July 2014 the reformed Dragon have played over 600 shows. In November 2013 the band mounted a 20 date acoustic tour in cathedrals and churches in New Zealand. In 2014 they Toured Australia from March through to the end of June with The Trilogy Tour, a tour that featured the three main eras of the band, The Young Years (1970s), The Glory Years (1980s) and The Phoenix Years (2006 on). Dragon are The Harbour Agency's hardest working band. They play almost every weekend of the year. After a break since March 2020 due to COVID-19 the band start playing in New Zealand in January 2021 for the Greenstone Tour and are booked until NYE 2022.

== Personal life ==
Hunter and his partner, Johanna Pigott, have three sons: Harry Hunter, James Hunter and Joey Hunter.

== Awards ==
=== Aotearoa Music Awards ===
The Aotearoa Music Awards (previously known as New Zealand Music Awards (NZMA)) are an annual awards night celebrating excellence in New Zealand music and have been presented annually since 1965.

Year	Nominee / work	Award	Result	Ref.
2011	Todd Hunter (as part of Dragon)	New Zealand Music Hall of Fame	inductee	
