= Minson =

Minson is a surname. Notable people with the surname include:

- Artie Minson, American businessman
- John Minson (1927–2017), Australian radio personality
- Lawrie Minson (born 1958), Australian guitarist
- Roland Minson (1929–2020), American basketball player
- Sofia Minson (born 1984), New Zealand oil painter
- Tony Minson (born 1944), English virologist
- Will Minson (born 1985), Australian football player
