= Chuck Jackson =

American R&B singer (1937–2023)

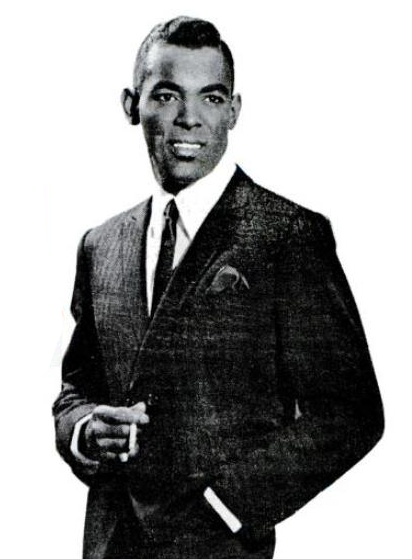
- Jackson in 1965

Background information
- Born: Charles Benjamin Jackson; July 22, 1937; Winston-Salem, North Carolina, U.S.
- Died: February 16, 2023 (aged 85) Atlanta, Georgia, U.S.
- Genre: R&B
- Occupation: Singer
- Instrument: Vocals
- Labels: Wand; Motown; All Platinum; Carolina

Charles Benjamin Jackson (July 22, 1937 – February 16, 2023) was an American R&B singer who was one of the first artists to record material by Burt Bacharach and Hal David successfully. Between 1957 and 1959, he was a member of The Del-Vikings. He performed with moderate success starting in 1961. His hits include "I Can't Break Away", "I Don't Want to Cry!" "Any Day Now", "I Keep Forgettin'", and "All Over the World". He is often confused with Charles "Chuck" Jackson (no relation), a younger singer who also recorded for Scepter Records' Wand label in the 1970s, led the R&B group The Independents and produced Natalie Cole along with Marvin Yancy.

== Career ==
Jackson was born in Winston-Salem, North Carolina, in 1937. He grew up in Latta, South Carolina, singing in a gospel group, and moved to Pittsburgh when he was 13.

Between 1957 and 1959, he was a member of The Del-Vikings, singing lead on the 1957 release "Willette". After leaving the group, he was "discovered" by Luther Dixon when he opened for Jackie Wilson at the Apollo Theater. He signed a recording contract with Scepter Records subsidiary Wand Records. His first single, "I Don't Want to Cry", which he co-wrote (with Luther Dixon) and recorded in November 1960, was his first hit (released in January 1961). The song charted on both the R&B and pop charts. In 1962, Jackson's recording of the Burt Bacharach-Bob Hilliard song "Any Day Now" became a sizable hit and his signature song. His popularity in the 1960s prompted him to buy out the time on his contract from Scepter and move to Motown Records. Despite the quality of his first album with the company, he later commented the decision was "one of the worst mistakes I ever made in my life" due to the fact that they gave his work very little promotion. He recorded a few successful singles including "Honey Come Back" for Motown. Then he recorded for All Platinum and other labels but with minimal success.

After meeting producer/composer Charles Wallert at the Third Annual Beach Music Awards, the two collaborated to record "How Long Have You Been Loving Me" on Carolina Records. In 1998, Jackson teamed with longtime friend Dionne Warwick and recorded "If I Let Myself Go"; it was arranged as a duet by Wallert for Wave Entertainment. The recording received critical acclaim charting at number 19 on the Gavin Adult Contemporary Charts. Jackson then released "What Goes Around, Comes Around", another Wallert production and composition; it reached No. 13 on the Gavin Charts.

== Legacy ==
Several of Jackson's songs later became hits for other artists including Ronnie Milsap, whose 1982 cover version of "Any Day Now" reached No. 1 on the Country and Adult Contemporary charts. Michael McDonald covered "I Keep Forgettin'" with much success. "I Keep Forgettin'" was also covered by David Bowie on his album Tonight, as well as on a version produced by Phil Spector for the Checkmates, Ltd. Jackson was close friends with political strategist Lee Atwater. He appears in the documentary Boogie Man: The Lee Atwater Story.

Australian pop-rock band Big Pig recorded a cover of "I Can't Break Away", simply titled "Breakaway", which was used as the opening theme to the 1989 film Bill & Ted's Excellent Adventure. The song was covered in 2007 by house music singer Inaya Day.

On 4 October 2015, Chuck Jackson was inducted into the Rhythm and Blues Music Hall of Fame. His song "Hand it Over" was featured on the 2019 video game, Far Cry New Dawn. In 2021, his song "Any Day Now" was used in a Volkswagen commercial.

Jackson died on February 16, 2023, at the age of 85.

== Awards ==
- 1992: Rhythm and Blues Foundation, Pioneer Award
- 2009: Carolina Beach Music Hall of Fame, Joe Pope Pioneer Award
- 2015: National Rhythm and Blues Hall of Fame

== Discography (selected) ==
=== Albums ===
- 1961: I Don't Want to Cry! (Wand WDM-650)
- 1962: Any Day Now (Wand WDM-654)
- 1963: Encore! (Wand WDM-655)
- 1964: Chuck Jackson on Tour (Wand WDM-658)
- 1965: Mr. Everything (Wand WDM-667)
- 1965: Saying Something, with Maxine Brown (Wand WDM-669)
- 1966: A Tribute to Rhythm and Blues (Wand WDM-673)
- 1966: A Tribute to Rhythm and Blues, Volume 2 (Wand WDM-676)
- 1966: Dedicated to the King (Wand WDM-680)
- 1967: Greatest Hits (Wand WDM-683)
- 1967: Hold On, We're Coming, with Maxine Brown (Wand WDM-678)
- 1967: The Early Show, with Tammi Terrell (Wand WDM-682)
- 1968: Chuck Jackson Arrives (Motown)
- 1969: Goin' Back to Chuck Jackson (Motown)
- 1970: Teardrops Keep Fallin' on My Heart (Motown)
- 1974: Through All Times (ABC)
- 1975: Needing You, Wanting You (All Platinum)
- 1977: The Great Chuck Jackson (Bulldog)
- 1980: After You (EMI America)
- 1980: I Wanna Give You Some Love (EMI America)
- 1992: I'll Take Care of You, with Cissy Houston (Shanachie Entertainment)
- 1994: Chuck Jackson (Platinum Pop)
- 1994: Encore/Mr. Everything (Kent-UK)
- 1998: Smooth, Smooth Jackson (Sequel Records)

=== Singles ===
Year	Single (A-side, B-side) Both sides from same album except where indicated	Chart positions		Album
Year	Single (A-side, B-side) Both sides from same album except where indicated	US	US R&B	Album
1957	"Woke Up This Morning" b/w "Willette"; Both sides with Kripp Johnson			Non-album tracks
1959	"Willette" b/w "A Little Man Cried"			Non-album tracks
1959	"Come on and Love Me" b/w "Ooh Baby"			Non-album tracks
1960	"I'm Yours" b/w "Hula Lula"			Non-album tracks
1961	"I Don't Want to Cry" b/w "Just Once" (from Any Day Now)	36	5	I Don't Want to Cry!
1961	"(It Never Happens) In Real Life" b/w "The Same Old Story"	46	22	Any Day Now
1961	"Mr. Pride" b/w "Hula Lula"	91		Non-album tracks
1961	"Never Let Me Go" b/w "Baby I Want to Marry You"			Non-album tracks
1961	"I Wake Up Crying" b/w "Everybody Needs Love" (from Any Day Now)	59	13	I Don't Want to Cry!
1961	"The Breaking Point" b/w "My Willow Tree" (from I Don't Want to Cry!)			Any Day Now
1962	"What'cha Gonna Say Tomorrow" b/w "Angel Of Angels"			Any Day Now
1962	"Any Day Now" b/w "The Prophet"	23	2	Any Day Now
1962	"Come on and Love Me" b/w "Ooh Baby"; Second pressing			Non-album tracks
1962	"I Keep Forgettin'" /	55		Any Day Now
1962	"Who's Gonna Pick Up the Pieces"	119		Any Day Now
1962	"Getting Ready for the Heartbreak" b/w "In Between Tears" (from I Don't Want to Cry!)	88		Encore!
1962	"I'm Yours" b/w "Hula Lula"; Second pressing			Non-album tracks
1963	"Tell Him I'm Not Home" b/w "Lonely Am I"	42	12	Encore!
1963	"Tears of Joy" /	85		Mr. Everything
1963	"I Will Never Turn My Back on You"	110	29	Non-album track
1963	"Any Other Way" b/w "Big New York" (Non-album track)	81	47	Chuck Jackson's Greatest Hits
1964	"Hand It Over" b/w "Look Over Your Shoulder"	92	13	Non-album tracks
1964	"Beg Me"; Original B-side: "For All Time" (Non-album track); Later B-side: "This Broken Heart" (from Encore!)	45	5	Chuck Jackson's Greatest Hits
1964	"Somebody New" b/w "Stand by Me" (Non-album track)	93		Mr. Everything
1964	"Since I Don't Have You" b/w "Hand It Over" (Non-album track)	47	18	Mr. Everything
1965	"I Need You" b/w "Soul Brother's Twist" (from Chuck Jackson on Tour)	75	22	Mr. Everything
1965	"Something You Got" b/w "Baby Take Me"; Both sides with Maxine Brown	55	10	Saying Something
1965	"If I Didn't Love You" b/w "Just A Little Bit of Your Soul" (Non-album track)	46	18	Mr. Everything
1965	"Can't Let You Out of My Sight" b/w "Don't Go"; Both sides with Maxine Brown	91		Saying Something
1965	"I Need You So" b/w "'Cause We're in Love"; Both sides with Maxine Brown	98		Saying Something
1965	"Good Things Come to Those Who Wait" b/w "Yah"	105		Non-album tracks
1966	"I'm Satisfied" (With Maxine Brown) /	112		Saying Something
1966	"Please Don't Hurt Me" (With Maxine Brown)			Saying Something
1966	"All in My Mind" b/w "And That's Saying a Lot" (Non-album track)			Tribute to Rhythm and Blues
1966	"These Chains of Love" b/w "Theme to the Blues" (from Tribute to Rhythm and Blues)			Non-album track
1967	"Hold On, I'm Comin'" b/w "Never Had It So Good" (from Saying Something); Both sides with Maxine Brown	91	20	Hold on We're Coming!
1967	"Need You There (to See Me Through)" b/w "Every Man Needs a Down Home Girl" (from Tribute to Rhythm and Blues Volume 2)			Non-album track
1967	"Daddy's Home" b/w "Don't Go" (from Saying Something); Both sides with Maxine Brown	91	46	Hold on We're Coming!
1967	"Hound Dog" b/w "Love Me Tender"			Dedicated to the King!
1967	"C.C. Rider" b/w "Tennessee Waltz"; Both sides with Maxine Brown			Hold on We're Coming!
1967	"Shame on Me" b/w "Candy" (Non-album track)	76	40	Chuck Jackson's Greatest Hits
1968	"(You Can't Let the Boy Overpower) The Man in You" b/w "Girls Girls Girls"	94		Chuck Jackson Arrives!
1969	"Are You Lonely for Me Baby" b/w "Your Wonderful Love" (from Chuck Jackson Arrives!)	107	27	Goin' Back to Chuck Jackson
1969	"Honey Come Back" b/w "What Am I Gonna Do Without You" (from Chuck Jackson Arrives!)		43	Goin' Back to Chuck Jackson
1969	"Baby I'll Get It" b/w "The Day My World Stood Still" (from Goin' Back To Chuck Jackson)			Teardrops Keep Fallin' on My Heart
1970	"Let Somebody Love Me" b/w "Two Feet from Happiness"			Teardrops Keep Fallin' on My Heart
1971	"Pet Names" b/w "Is There Anything Love Can't Do" (from Teardrops Keep Fallin' on My Heart)			Non-album tracks
1972	"Cold Feet" b/w "A Little Man Cried"; Both sides with The Dell Vikings			Non-album tracks
1972	"The Man and the Woman" b/w "I Forgot to Tell You"			Non-album tracks
1973	"I Only Get This Feeling" b/w "Slowly but Surely"	117	35	Through All Times
1973	"I Can’t Break Away" b/w "Just a Little Tear"		62	Through All Times
1974	"Maybe This Will Be the Morning" b/w "If Only You Believe"			Through All Times
1974	"Take Off Your Make Up" b/w "Talk a Little Less" (from Through All Times)			Non-album track
1975	"Love Lights" b/w "Love Lights" (Instrumental)			Needing You, Wanting You
1975	"I'm Needing You, Wanting You" b/w "Shine Shine Shine"		30	Needing You, Wanting You
1976	"If You Were My Woman" b/w "If You Were My Woman" (Instrumental)			Non-album tracks
1977	"One of Those Yesterdays" b/w "Love Lights" (from Needing You, Wanting You)			Non-album tracks
1977	"I Fell Asleep" b/w "One of Those Yesterdays"			Non-album tracks
1977	"We Can't Hide It Anymore" (With Sylvia Jackson) b/w "I'm Needing You, Wanting You" (from Needing You, Wanting You)			Non-album tracks
1978	"When the Fuel Runs Out" b/w "Good Love"			Non-album tracks
1980	"I Wanna Give You Some Love" b/w "Waiting in Vain"		90	I Wanna Give You Some Love
1980	"After You" b/w "Let's Get Together"			I Wanna Give You Some Love
1989	"Relight My Fire" b/w "All Over the World"			Non-album tracks
1997	"If I Let Myself Go" p/w "What Goes Around Comes Around"; CD single, both tracks with Dionne Warwick			I'll Never Get Over You
2010	"I Only Get This Feeling"; B-side by Felice Taylor: "I Can Feel Your Love"			Non-album tracks

=== Singles on Tamla Motown (UK) ===
- TMG651 "Girls Girls Girls" / "(You Can't Let the Boy Overpower) The Man in You" – 7"
- TMG729 "Honey Come Back" / "What Am I Gonna Do Without You" – 7"
