= Jean Stafford (musician) =

Jean Stafford OAM
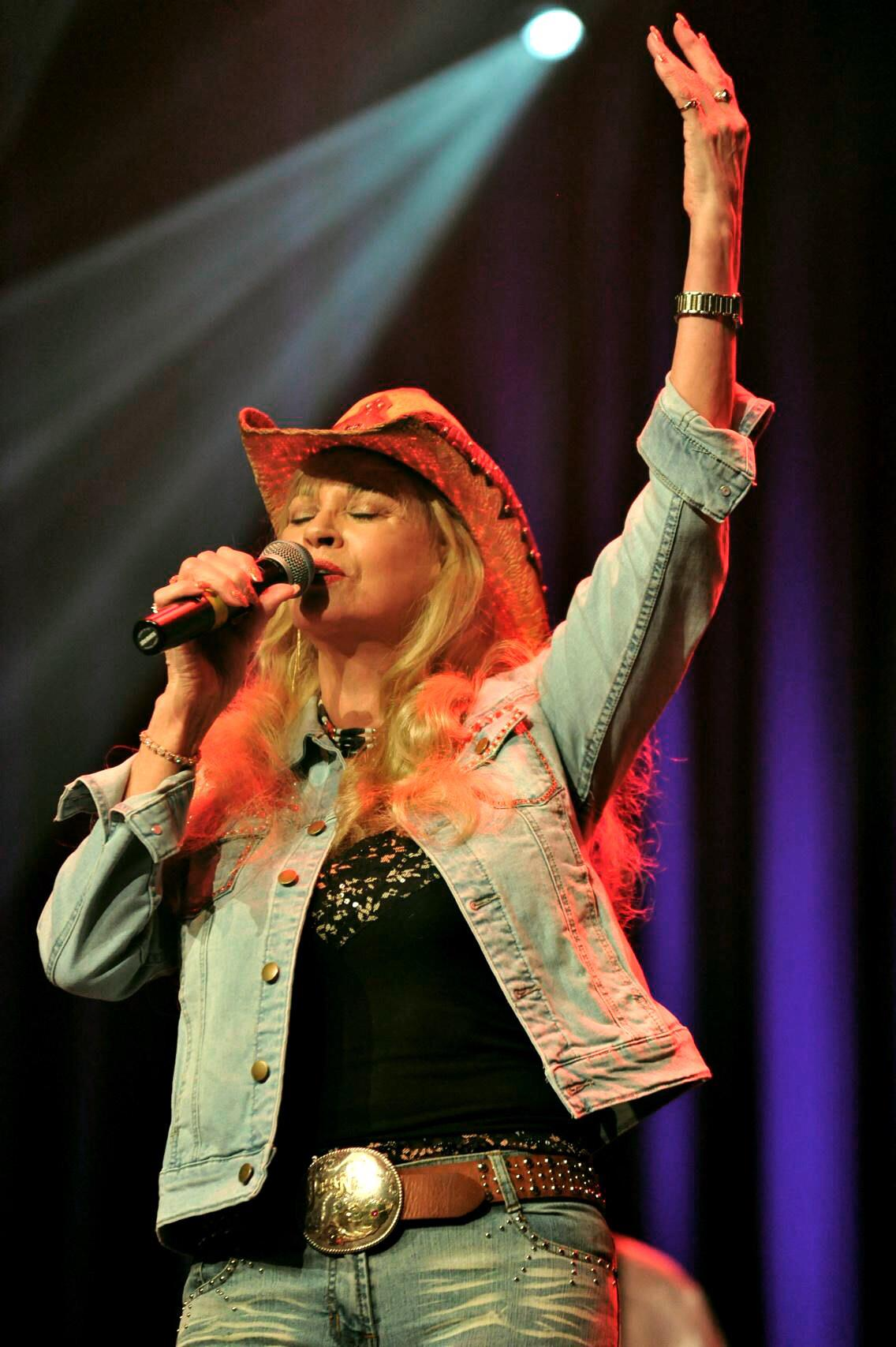
- Stafford in 2019

Background information
- Born: Jean Honora Stafford; 1 January 1950 (age 76); Latrobe, Tasmania, Australia
- Genres: Country
- Occupations: Singer-songwriter, paintist.
- Instruments: Vocals, guitar
- Years active: 1965–present.
- Labels: Hadley Records, EMI, UMA
- Website: jeanstaffordmusic.com

Jean Stafford OAM (born 1 January 1950) is a country music singer and songwriter who rose to fame in the 1970s and 1980s known for her rich voice and traditional country style. Stafford has won numerous awards and accolades, earning her the title as “Australia’s Queen of Country Music.” Stafford has sold gold and platinum albums throughout her career, along with her hit song Someday I'll Take Home The Roses.

In 1991, Stafford was awarded a ceremonial Key to the City of Nashville by Mayor Bill Boner, in recognition of her significant contributions to country music and her efforts in promoting cultural ties between Australia and the United States — Notably, Stafford is the only Australian to have received this distinction from Nashville.

Stafford also received honorary Tennessean citizenship by the Tennessee Governor Ned McWherter, this honor awarded in recognition of her significant and outstanding service to country music.

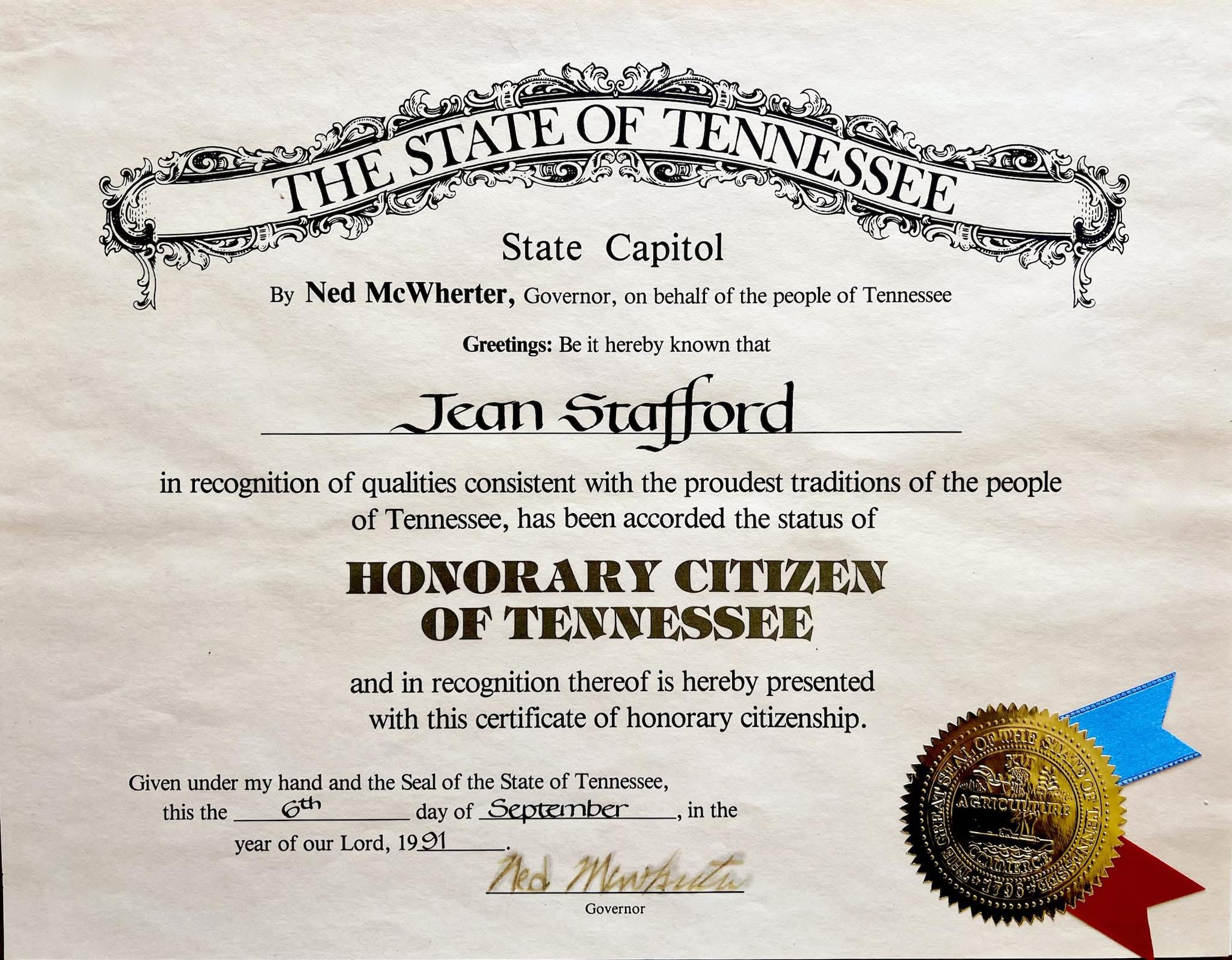
Jean Stafford Honorary Citizen Of Tennessee

Stafford was the first and only female country music artist to have albums with high sales that led to her receiving two Aria nominations at the 1987 Aria Awards inauguration. Stafford has won four Golden Guitar awards and was inducted into the Country Music Awards of Australia's "Roll Of Renown" in 2008.

Stafford was a regular guest on "Midday" a popular Australian television program on the Nine Network hosted by Ray Martin during the 1980s and 1990s with over 40 performances. Alongside midday, her numerous appearances on Australian television shows like "The Mike Walsh Show", "The Ernie Sigley Show" and "It's Country Today", Stafford holds the record for the most appearances by an individual female country music artist in Australian television history.

== Early life and career ==
Stafford was born on January 1, 1950. and grew up in the rural country town of Meander in northern Tasmania.

In 1962, at the age of 12, Stafford made her first television appearance on a program called ShowTime a popular series from TNT-9 Launceston, Tasmania at that time. After leaving school in Meander, Stafford worked at a hotel as a kitchen hand in a nearby town of Deloraine, Tasmania, while performing at local dances on weekends, she began to learn her craft as a professional singer.

Stafford began her recording career in 1965, teaming up with Australian country music pioneer Dusty Rankin. Stafford recorded several tracks with Rankin including “Promised To John” for Hadley Recording Company owned and operated by Eric Scott in Tamworth.

In 1970, Stafford recorded two tracks on a special mixed artists L.P. (Country Music Around Australia Volume 1) with Hadley “The Hands You’re Holding Now” and “I Thought Of You”.

=== 1973-1980s ===
In 1973, Stafford won first prize in a Country Music Talent contest in Launceston and with this received a five-album deal with Hadley Records. Stafford's debut album Flowers for Mama was recorded in Tamworth was released in 1974. It gained her Australia-wide recognition, winning her first Golden Guitar Award at the 1975 Country Music Awards of Australia with the song "What Kind of a Girl Do You Think I Am". In 1979, Stafford imprinted her hands into the Tamworth Hands of Fame. Stafford won her a second Golden Guitar award for Female Vocalist of the Year in 1980. followed by her third Golden Guitar award for Female Vocalist of the Year 1981.

After exiting Hadley Records, Stafford signed with a recording company in Sydney, EMI Music Australia Her first album with them was The Way I Feel Inside, released in 1981.

Someday I'll Take Home the Roses, Stafford's second album under the EMI deal, was released in 1982. The album's title track was written by Stafford and became a hit single, and the album itself debuted at number 21 on the Australian country music chart.

Stafford's final album under the EMI Music Australia deal was Burning Bright, co-produced by Rod Coe and released in 1986. The album featured a more polished sound, with elements of cross-over music infused into Stafford's traditional country sound. Besides the success of three singles on the album, "Beyond The Great Divide," was a top-40 hit in Australia.

In 1985, Stafford began appearing on the Ray Martin Midday Show, Stafford was asked that same year to be part of the Australia Too campaign, recording the charity single "The Garden" for Freedom from Hunger in Ethiopia. The song peaked at number 38 on the Australian charts. At the 1986 Country Music Awards of Australia, it won Song of the Year. and at the APRA Music Awards of 1987, the song won Most Performed Australasian Country Work.

At the inaugural ARIA Music Awards in 1987, Stafford received two nominations. She was the sole female nominee in the Best Country Album category and the only country artist nominated for Best Female Artist, becoming the first female country artist to be nominated at the ARIA Awards and breaking new ground for future women in Australian country music. In 1988, her first compilation album, The Golden Voice of Country, was released.

In 1988, Stafford performed at World Expo ’88 in Brisbane, Queensland, appearing on the Country Music Spectacular at the River Stage alongside Smoky Dawson, Evelyn Bury, James Blundell, and other Australian country artists.

In 1989, Stafford was crowned Australia's Queen of Country Music in Sydney by Smoky Dawson. Notably the same year she toured with American country music legend Slim Whitman during his Australian tour.

=== 1990s ===
In 1990, Stafford released the album Classic Jean Stafford before heading to Nashville, Tennessee where she recorded the album, That Says it All; it was released in 1991. In the 1991 Mo Awards, Stafford won Female Country Entertainer of the Year.

In 1992, Stafford was appointed Honorary Commissioner to the US by Tasmanian Government for three years, which was later extended.

In 1993, Stafford wrote and recorded the song "Tassie's Got It All", promoting Tasmanian tourism.

In 1996, Stafford was inducted into the South Australian Country Music Festival Award's Hall of Fame.

In 1997, Stafford collaborated with Grand Ole Opry superstar Kitty Wells. The duo recorded Wells' 1952 hit "It Wasn't God Who Made Honky Tonk Angels" as a single and later released on compilation album as The Queens of Country Music.

In 1998, Stafford and Wells formed an Australian tour to promote the album ending their final concert in Comet, Queensland.

=== 2000s ===
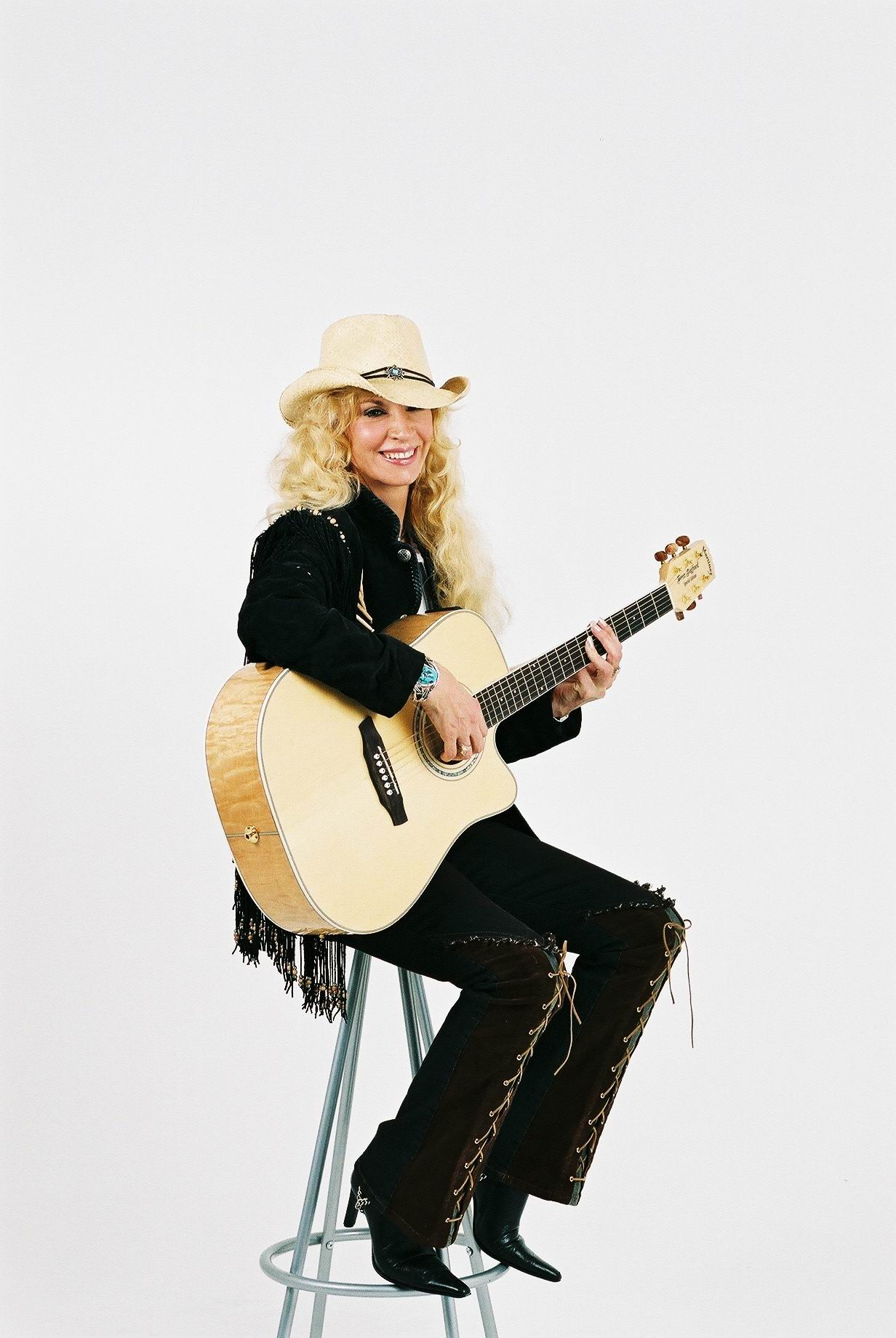
JeanStafford

In 2004, Stafford produced her eleventh studio album Let the Dance Begin, co-produced with Jimmie Crawford in Nashville, her first commercial release in over a decade. All songs on the album were composed and written by Stafford. The album “Let the Dance Begin” has won Stafford many awards and accolades, including Female Vocalist of the Year at the Western Country Music Awards in Fort Worth, Texas, becoming the first Australian to be nominated and win a Western Country Music Awards.

In 2008, Stafford was elevated to Australian Roll of Renown at the Country Music Awards Australia before relocating back to Tasmania in 2009.

=== 2010 to present ===
In 2012, Stafford was inducted into the Tasmania Axemans Wall of Fame. In 2016, Stafford was the inaugural inductee in the Tasmanian Independent Country Music Awards Hall of Fame.

In 2019, at the annual Country Music Awards of Australia held in Tamworth, Stafford was announced by the CMAAs as the official "Australia's Queen Of Country Music" for first time since being crowned by Smoky Dawson in 1989.

In 2021, Stafford was inducted into the Tasmanian Honour Roll of Women (for services to arts and media).

On 12 June 2023, Stafford received the Medal of the Order of Australia (OAM) in the King's Birthday Honours for her "service to the performing arts".

On June 8, 2025, Stafford released a self-penned single titled Wild Hearts, which explores the theme of adversity underlying Cyber Bullying and Domestic Violence. Produced by Matt Fell.

== Discography ==
=== Studio albums ===
Title	Details
Flowers for Mama	Released: 1974; Label: Hadley Records (HLP 1216); Format: LP
Jean Stafford	Released: 1975; Label: Hadley Records (HLP 1221); Format: LP
I'll Sing You a Country Song	Released: 1977; Label: Hadley Records (HLP 1236); Format: LP
Hello Love	Released: 1979; Label: Hadley Records (HLP 1242); Format: LP, Cassette
Born Again	Released: 1980; Label: Hadley Records (HLP 1246); Format: LP, Cassette
The Way I Feel Inside	Released: 1981; Label: EMI (EMX 110); Format: LP, Cassette, Digital
Someday I'll Take Home the Roses	Released: 1982; Label: EMI Music (EMX 116); Format: LP, Cassette
Burning Bright	Released: 1986; Label: EMI Music (EMX.430040); Format: LP, Cassette; Reissue, Digital, Checked Label Services 2025
Classic Jean Stafford	Released: 1990; Label: Rich River Records (JSR 1990); Format: LP, Cassette, CD
That Says it All	Released: 1991; Label: Dino (214); Format: CD, Cassette
Welcome To My World	Released: 1995; Label: One Stop Country; Format: CD
Let the Dance Begin	Released: 2005; Reissue: 2025; Lebel: Checked Label Services; Formats: CD, digital

=== Compilation albums ===
Title	Details
The Golden Voice of Country	Released: 1988; Label: Axis (AX 701403); Format: LP, Cassette, Digital; Reissue: 2015 (UMG)
Finest Collection	Released: 1993; Label: Dino (271); Format: Cassette, CD
Country Girl	Released: 1994; Label: Axis (701533); Format: Cassette, CD
Queens of Country Music (with Kitty Wells)	Released: 1998; Label: Massive (21682); Format: CD
Jean Stafford - Finest Collection: 18 of Her Greatest Hits	Reissue: 2020; Label: Dino Music (DIN271C); Format: Digital

=== Singles ===
==== Other singles ====
List of singles as featured artist, with selected chart positions
Title	Year	Peak chart positions
Title	Year	AUS
"What Kind Of A Girl (Do you think I am?)"	1974	1
"Fire At Shepherds Flat"	1981	
"Let’s Hear It For The Working Man"	1985	
"Rock Me by the Fire” / “The Only Love I Found"	1986	
"Along the Razor’s Edge"	1987	
"Tassie’s Got It All"	1995	
"The Garden" (as Australia Too)	1985	22
"It Wasn’t God Who Made Honky Tonk Angels" (Duet with Kitty Wells)	1998	
"Don’t Bet Your Boots"	2005	
"Flowers For Mama" (The 50th Anniversary)	2025	
"Wild Hearts"	2025	
"I’m On My Way"	2025	

== Television performances ==
In 1985, Stafford began performing regularly on Midday hosted by Ray Martin on the Nine Network.

In 1993, after 14 seasons and over 47 performances, Stafford ended her final performance on Midday.

== Awards and nominations ==
=== ARIA Awards ===
Stafford had been nominated for 2 ARIA Music Awards

Year	Nominee / work	Award	Result
1987	Burning Bright	Best Country Album	Nominated
1987	Burning Bright	Best Female Artist	Nominated

=== APRA Awards ===
At the APRA Music Awards of 1987, Stafford was one of the vocalist in the Australian Supergroup line-up "Australia Too" the song The Garden won Most Performed Australasian Country Work. All Proceeds went to Freedom from Hunger in Ethiopia. The song peaked at number 38 on the Australian singles chart.

=== Australian Country Music Hall Of Fame ===
The Wax Museum is housed within the Tamworth Visitor Information Centre at the Big Golden Guitar complex. Established in 1983

Year	Nominee / work	Award	Result
1979	Jean Stafford	Hands of Fame	imprinted
1986	Jean Stafford	Wax Museum	immortalised
2008	Jean Stafford	Roll of Renown	Won

=== Black Opal International Songwriting Competition ===
The Australian Black Opal International Songwriting Competition was independently administered by A1 High Pty Ltd. Industry and media partners associated with the competition included APRA (Australasian Performing Right Association) and MCA Music Publishing. These organisations were involved as partners.

Year	Nominee / work	Award	Result
1995	“What Ever Happened”	Ballad Section	Won

=== Country Music Awards (CMAA) ===
Stafford has been nominated won three Golden guitar awards at the Tamworth Country Music Awards of Australia

Year	Nominee / work	Award	Result
1975	"What Kind of a Girl Do You Think I Am"	Female Vocalist of the Year	Won
1975	"Flowers For Mama"	Album of the Year	Nominated
1976	"Philadelphia Lawyer"	Female Vocalist of the Year	Nominated
1979	"Paper Roses"	Female Vocalist of the Year	Nominated
1980	Hello, Love	Female Vocalist of the Year	Won
1980	"Hello Love"	Album of the Year	Nominated
1981	"That Glory Bound Train"	Female Vocalist of the Year	Won
1981	"Born Again"	Album of the Year	Nominated
1982	"Cold Winter Body"	Female Vocalist of the Year	Nominated
1982	"The Way I Feel Inside"	Album of the Year	Nominated
1983	"Someday I’ll Take Home The Roses"	Female Vocalist of the Year	Nominated
1983	"Someday I’ll Take Home The Roses"	Album of the Year	Nominated
1986	"The Garden" by Australian Supergroup "Australia Too"	Apra Song Of The Year (awarded to Alan Caswell) only	Won
1986	"Lets Hear It For The Working Man"	Female Vocalist of the Year	Nominated
1987	"Rock Me By The Fire"	Female Vocalist of the Year	Nominated
1987	"Burning Bright"	Album of the Year	Nominated

=== Dusty Boots Awards ===
The Dusty Boots Awards, is an annual event celebrating contributions to the Australian country music industry. Founded and organized by Mal Norton, the awards are held during the Dusty Boots Festival at the Narromine United Services Memorial Club (USMC) in New South Wales.

Dusty Boots Awards

Year	Nominee / work	Award	Result
2025	herself	Keeping The Dream Alive Award	Won

=== Mo Awards ===
The Mo Awards was an annual Australian entertainment industry awards. They recognised achievements in live entertainment in Australia. Stafford has won two awards.

Year	Nominee / work	Award	Result
1990	Jean Stafford	Female Country Entertainer of the Year	Won
2015	Jean Stafford	Country Female Act of the Year	Won

=== NSW Country Music Awards ===
The Sydney Country Music Festival ran from 1992 to about 1994 and was discontinued by 1995.

Year	Nominee / work	Award	Result
1993	Jean Stafford	Services to the Industry	Won

=== NZ Golden Guitar Awards ===
Year	Nominee / work	Award	Result
1988	Jean Stafford	Services to the Industry of Country Music	Won

=== South Australian Country Music Festival Awards ===
Year	Nominee / work	Award	Result
1996	herself	Hall of Fame	inducted

=== Tasmania Axemans Wall of Fame ===
Year	Nominee / work	Award	Result
2012	herself	Wall of Fame	inducted

=== Tasmanian Independent Country Music Awards ===
The Tasmanian Independent Country Music Awards commenced in 2016.

Year	Nominee / work	Award	Result
2016	herself	Hall of Fame	inducted

=== Western Country Music Awards ===
The Western Country Music Awards commenced in 1996 at Fort Worth, Texas, recognising the performers and artisans active in the contemporary cowboy and western movement.

Year	Nominee / work	Award	Result
2006	Steelin' The 2 Step	Female Vocalist of the Year	Won
