= The Three Chord Wonders =

Australian country music trio

Three Chord Wonders
- Genre: Country
- Years active: 1985-1988
- Past members: Andrew Clermont; Lawrie Minson; John Green

Three Chord Wonders were an Australian country music trio of Andrew Clermont, Lawrie Minson and John Green, which formed in 1985. Their album, Try Change (1986), was nominated for a 1987 ARIA Award for Best Country Album. The group disbanded in 1988

== Discography ==
=== Albums ===
Title	Album details
Try Change	Released: 1986; Label: EMI (EMX 430041)

== Awards and nominations ==
=== ARIA Music Awards ===
The ARIA Music Awards is an annual awards ceremony held by the Australian Recording Industry Association. They commenced in 1987.

Year	Nominee / work	Award	Result	Ref.
1987	Try Change	Best Country Album	Nominated	

=== Country Music Awards of Australia ===
The Country Music Awards of Australia (CMAA) (also known as the Golden Guitar Awards) is an annual awards night held in January during the Tamworth Country Music Festival, celebrating recording excellence in the Australian country music industry. They have been held annually since 1973.

Year	Nominee / work	Award	Result
1987	"Losin' My Blues Tonight"	Vocal Group or Duo of the Year	Won
