= Excess All Areas =

Excess All Areas may refer to:

- Excess All Areas (Kevin Bloody Wilson album), 2009
- Excess All Areas (Shy album), 1987
- Excess All Areas (Scooter album), 2006
- Happy Mondays – Excess All Areas: A Biography, a book on Happy Mondays
