= Vince Jones =

Australian jazz musician

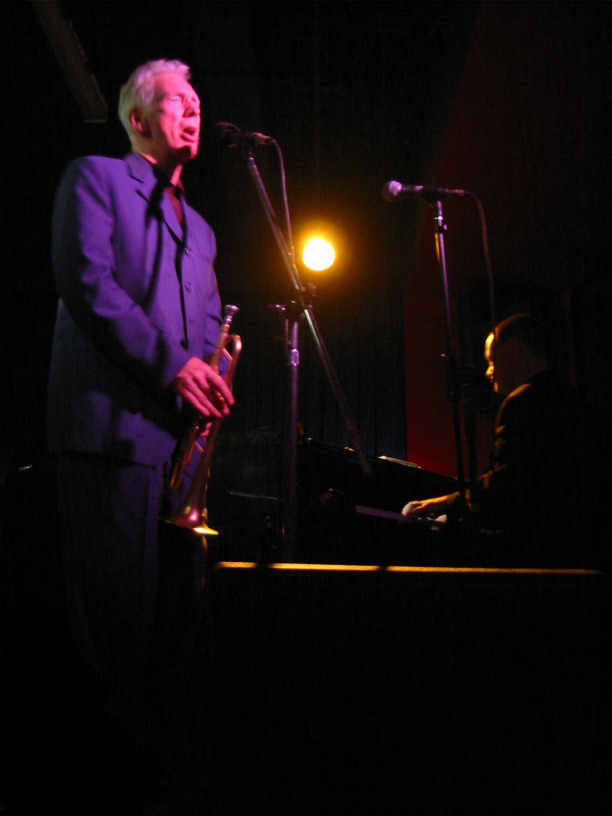
- Jones in concert, October 2006

Background information
- Born: Vincent Hugh Jones; 24 March 1954 (age 72); Paisley, Scotland, United Kingdom
- Origin: Wollongong, New South Wales, Australia
- Genres: Jazz
- Occupation: Musician
- Instruments: Voice, flugelhorn, trumpet, flumpet
- Years active: 1974–present
- Website: vincejones.com.au

Vincent Hugh Jones (born 24 March 1954) is an Australian jazz singer, songwriter, and trumpet, flugelhorn and flumpet player. His music includes both original material and new contemporary versions of jazz standards. His themes are often love, inequity, injustice, peace and anti-greed.

== Biography ==
Vincent Hugh Jones was born on 24 March 1954 in Paisley, Scotland. He is the second eldest of four children to John Jones and Mary (née Docherty); the family moved to Australia in April 1964 and lived in Wollongong; where Jones attended Corrimal High School. He attributes his love of jazz to hearing Miles Davis's album Sketches of Spain, when he was about 14 and taught himself to play the trumpet. Jones began his career in 1974 in New South Wales as a bebop trumpet player on the club and jazz circuit.

In November 1981 Jones recorded his debut album, Watch What Happens, with John Bye producing at Richmond Recorders in Melbourne. Adrian Jackson of Jazz magazine touted Jones as the "new Melbourne jazz star" in June 1982.

In 1994, he contributed "A Song for You" for Kate Ceberano's 1994 album, Kate Ceberano and Friends.

On 25 May 2011, Vince appeared as a contestant in Episode #7.4 of music quiz show Spicks and Specks.

== Discography ==
=== Albums ===
Name	Album details	Peak chart positions	Certification
Name	Album details	AUS	Certification
Watch What Happens	Released: 1982; Label: EMI Music; Format: LP, Cassette	-	
Spell	Released: 1983; Label: John Bye Productions, EMI; Format: LP, Cassette	-	
For All Colours	Released: 1984; Label: Suitable Management, EMI; Format: LP, Cassette	54	
On the Brink of It	Released: November 1985; Label: Suitable Management, EMI; Format: CD, LP	58	
Tell Me a Secret	Released: November 1986; Label: Suitable Management, EMI; Format: CD, LP	71	
It All Ends Up in Tears	Released: October 1987; Label: Suitable Management, EMI; Format: CD, LP, Cassette	79	
Trustworthy Little Sweethearts	Released: February 1989; Label: EMI; Format: CD, LP, Cassette	42	
Come in Spinner (with Grace Knight)	Released: March 1990; Label: ABC Records; Format: CD, LP, Cassette	4	ARIA: 2xPlatinum
One Day Spent	Released: August 1990; Label: EMI; Format: CD, LP, Cassette	42	
Future Girl	Released: 1992; Label: EMI; Format: CD	-	
The Complete	Released: 1993 (Germany); Label: Intuition Records; Format: CD; Best of compilation	-	
Here's To The Miracles	Released: 1995; Label: EMI; Format: CD	-	
Virtue: The Best of Vince Jones	Released: 1996; Label: EMI; Format: CD; Best of compilation	-	
Live	Released: 2003; Label: Universal Music Australia; Format: CD, Digital Download; Live album	-	
Gold	Released: 2004; Label: Universal Music Australia; Format: 2x CD, Digital Download; Best of compilation	-	
Moving Through Taboos	Released: 2004; Label: Universal Music Australia; Format: CD, Digital Download	-	
Modern Folk	Released: 2010; Label: Vitamin; Format: CD, Digital Download; Live album	-	
The Monash Sessions	Released: 6 June 2014; Label: A Jazzhead Recordings; Format: CD, Digital Download	-	
Provenance (with Paul Grabowsky)	Released: October 2015; Label: ABC Jazz; Format: CD, Digital Download	-	
A Personal Selection	Released: April 2019; Label: Vince Jones; Format: CD, Digital Download, streaming	-	
Tyneham: No Small Sacrifice (with Jordan Paul Clarke)	Released: June 2020; Label: Live New Musicals; Format: Digital Download, streaming	-	

== Awards ==
=== AIR Awards ===
The Australian Independent Record Awards (commonly known informally as AIR Awards) is an annual awards night to recognise, promote and celebrate the success of Australia's Independent Music sector.

Year	Nominee / work	Award	Result
2017	Provanance (with Paul Grabowsky)	Best Independent Jazz Album	Nominated

=== APRA Awards ===
The APRA Awards are held in Australia and New Zealand by the Australasian Performing Right Association to recognise songwriting skills, sales and airplay performance by its members annually. Jones has won three awards from four nominations.

Year	Nominee / work	Award	Result
1986	"For All Colours"	Most Performed Australian Jazz Work	Won
1987	"Blue"	Most Performed Australian Jazz Work	Won
1993	"Hindered on His Way to Heaven" (with Barney McAll)	Jazz Composition of the Year	Won
2017	"Still Night" (with Andrea Keller, Stephen Magnusson, Gian Slater and Julien Wilson)	Jazz Work of the Year	Nominated

=== ARIA Music Awards ===
The ARIA Music Awards is an annual awards ceremony that recognises excellence, innovation, and achievement across all genres of Australian music. It commenced in 1987. Jones has won three awards from nine nominations.

Year	Nominee / work	Award	Result
1987	Tell Me a Secret	Best Jazz Album	Nominated
1987	Tell Me a Secret	Best Adult Contemporary Album	Nominated
1988	It All Ends Up in Tears	Best Jazz Album	Won
1990	Trustworthy Little Sweethearts	Best Jazz Album	Nominated
1991	Come in Spinner (with Grace Knight)	Best Original Soundtrack/Cast/Show Album	Nominated
1991	Come in Spinner (with Grace Knight)	Best Adult Contemporary Album	Won
1993	Future Girl	Best Jazz Album	Nominated
2014	The Monash Sessions	Best Jazz Album	Nominated
2016	Provenance (with Paul Grabowsky)	Best Jazz Album	Won

=== Australian Jazz Bell Awards ===
The Australian Jazz Bell Awards, also known as the Bell Awards or The Bells, are annual music awards for the jazz music genre in Australia. They commenced in 2003. Jones has been nominated twice.

Year	Nominee / work	Award	Result
2004	Gold	Best Australian Jazz Vocal Album	Nominated
2016	Provenance (with Paul Grabowsky)	Best Australian Jazz Vocal Album	Nominated

=== Mo Awards ===
The Australian Entertainment Mo Awards (commonly known informally as the Mo Awards), were annual Australian entertainment industry awards. They recognise achievements in live entertainment in Australia from 1975 to 2016.

Year	Nominee / work	Award	Result (wins only)
1996	Vince Jones	Jazz Vocal Performer of the Year	Won
