= John Justin and the Thunderwings =

John Justin & the Thunderwings
- Origin: Melbourne, Victoria, Australia
- Genres: rock
- Years active: 1985 - 1987
- Label: Wheatley
- Members: John Justin; Paul Hines; Gordon Pitts; Carl Manuell; Tony Featherstone; Robert Wodrow

John Justin & the Thunderwings were an Australian rock band formed by John Justin (guitar, vocals), Paul Hines (keyboards), Gordon Pitts (bass, vocals), Carl Manuell (drums) in 1985. In 1987, Tony Featherstone (bass) replaced Pitts and Robert Wodrow (drums) replaced Manuell. They released one full-length album, Justice, in 1986.

Debbie Cameron of The Canberra Times described the impact of the album, "I am not wildly enthusiastic about this type of music so I do not want to be unduly unfriendly about it. All I will say is that Justin appears to be a competent exponent." Australian musicologist, Ian McFarlane, felt "[it] was brimming with swaggering glam-pop material."

Their debut single "Flash King Cadillac" (1986) was co-produced by Ross Fraser. Fraser was nominated for Producer of the Year at the ARIA Music Awards of 1987 for his work on this single and an album, Whispering Jack, by John Farnham.

== Discography ==
=== Studio albums ===
List of albums, with Australian chart positions
Title	Album details	Peak chart positions
Title	Album details	AUS
Justice	Released: September 1986; Format: LP, CD, Cassette; Label: Wheatley (WRLP 1017)	64

=== Singles ===
List of singles, with selected chart positions
Year	Title	Peak chart positions	Album
Year	Title	AUS	Album
1984	"It's Magic" (by John Justin)	64	non album single
1986	"Flash King Cadillac" (by John Justin & the Thunderwings)	51	Justice
1986	"Justice" (by John Justin & the Thunderwings)	-	Justice
1987	"Little Miss Love" (by John Justin & the Thunderwings)	-	Justice
1987	"Rock On" (by John Justin)	50	non album single
