= The Road Less Travelled (Graeme Connors album) =

Studio album by Graeme Connors
- Released: August 1996
- Studio: Mr. Jones, Brisbane
- Label: ABC Country
- Producer: Graeme Connors, Mark McDuff

Graeme Connors chronology
The Here and Now (1995)	The Road Less Travelled (1996)	One of the Family (1997)

The Road Less Travelled is the eighth studio album by Australian country music singer, Graeme Connors. It was released in August 1996 and peaked at number 62 on the ARIA charts.

At the ARIA Music Awards of 1997, the album won the ARIA Award for Best Country Album.

== Track listing ==
No.	Title	Length
1.	"The Road Less Travelled"	4:28
2.	"All That Matters Now" (with Elizabeth Lord)	4:38
3.	"I Won't Forget Loving You"	3:21
4.	"Let It Rain"	3:41
5.	"Boomerang in Paraguay"	4:35
6.	"Big Jimmy and Felicidad"	3:14
7.	"Talking to an Old Lover"	3:02
8.	"Hart Creek Debutante Ball"	3:46
9.	"The Places I Go in My Mind"	3:38
10.	"Sunset Bay"	3:51
11.	"You, Me, All the Same Brothers"	3:47

== Charts ==
Chart (1996)	Peak position
Australian (ARIA) chart	62

== Certifications ==
Region	Certification	Certified units/sales
Australia (ARIA)	Gold	35,000^{^}
^{^} Shipments figures based on certification alone.
