= Mike McClellan =

Australian singer/songwriter (born 1945)

- Birth name: Mike McClellan
- Born: 24 August 1945 (age 79); Melbourne, Victoria, Australia
- Genres: Folk pop
- Occupations: singer; songwriter; guitarist
- Instrument(s): Vocals, guitar
- Years active: Late 1960s–present
- Labels: Ata; EMI Music; Albert
- Website: www.mikemcclellan.com.au

Mike McClellan (born 24 August 1945) is an Australian folk pop singer-songwriter and musician who was performed since the late 1960s.

== Biography ==
McClellan began performing in the late 1960s and in 1972, released his debut album, titled simply Mike McClellan in 1972. McClellan toured extensively for the next two years playing the songs and previewing the material that would make up his next album.

In September 1974, McClellan's second album, Ask Any Dancer was released. The album peaked at number 22 on the Australian charts, and the album's lead single "Song and Danceman" was voted Song of the Year at the Annual Music Industry Awards in February 1975. In March 1976 McClellan released his third studio album, Until the Song is Done. The album peaked at number 61 on the Australian charts. McClellan recorded a live album, which was released in October 1977.

In 1979, McClellan compered his first television series, National Star Quest, which lead him to taking over the successful ABC program Country Road. Within a year, it was renamed and became Mike McClellan's Country Music and he continued to present the show for a further 3 years. In 1980, McClellan parted company with EMI and released Laughing in the Dark on the Albert's label. The album peaked at number 43 on the Australian charts and the single "The One I Love" peaked at number 45.

In 1982, McClellan travelled to the United Kingdom and United States. Upon his return in 1983, McClellan began writing for Mojo, then regarded a dynamic Australian ad agency, and he contributed words and music for clients such as Australian Airlines, Red Rooster, Channel 9, XXXX and Tooheys. McClellan left Mojo and, with a partner, set up his own agency called Kazoo. Kazoo grew rapidly and in 1991, was employing 30 staff. McClellan subsequently sold his share-holding in Kazoo and established Mike McClellan Pty Ltd.

In 1989, McClellan released his fifth studio album, The Heartland on the EMI label.

In 2001 a comprehensive retrospective of his recording career was released by EMI.

In 2011, McClellan released his first album of new songs in 20 years, titled If Only for a Moment, which was followed in 2014 by Dancing in the Rain and in July 2017, No Intermission.

== Discography ==
=== Studio albums ===
List of albums, with selected details and chart positions
Title	Details	Peak chart positions
Title	Details	AUS
Mike McClellan	Released: 1972; Format: LP; Label: Ata (L-34537)	—
Ask Any Dancer	Released: September 1974; Format: LP; Label: EMI (EMA 305)	22
Until the Song Is Done	Released: March 1976; Format: LP; Label: EMI (EMA 320)	61
Laughing in the Dark	Released: May 1980; Format: LP; Label: Albert Productions (APLP.044)	43
The Heartland	Released: 1989; Format: LP, CD, cassette; Label: EMI (EMX 791277)	—
If Only for a Moment	Released: July 2011; Format: CD, DD; Label: Mike McClellan Pty Ltd (MM07)	—
Dancing in the Rain	Released: 4 July 2014; Format: CD, DD; Label: Mike McClellan Pty Ltd (MM08)	—
No Intermission	Released: July 2017; Format: CD, DD; Label: Mike McClellan Pty Ltd (MM09)	—

=== Live albums ===
List of albums, with selected details and chart positions
Title	Details	Peak chart positions
Title	Details	AUS
An Evening with Mike McClellan – Live	Released: October 1977; Format: LP; Label: EMI (EMC.2623)	97

=== Compilation albums ===
List of compilations, with selected details
Title	Details
Repeat Prescription	Released: 1987; Format: LP, cassette; Label: Axis (AX 701365)
Time and Time Again: The Best of the Song and Danceman	Released: 2001; Format: 2×CD; Label: EMI (72435356252-6)

=== Singles ===
List of singles, with selected chart positions
Year	Title	Peak chart positions	Album
Year	Title	AUS	Album
1972	"Some Other Sunrise"	—	Mike McClellan
1972	"Susie Get Me Off This Train"	—	Mike McClellan
1974	"Song and Dance Man"	48	Ask Any Dancer
1974	"Rock 'n' Roll Lady"	—	Ask Any Dancer
1975	"Country Morning"	—	Non-album singles
1975	"Change Your Ways"	—	Non-album singles
1975	"Carry Me (Until the Song Is Done)"	—	Until the Song Is Done
1976	"Room Service"	—	Until the Song Is Done
1977	"Another Night"	—	Non-album single
1980	"Good Companions"	—	Laughing in the Dark
1980	"The One I Love"	45	Laughing in the Dark
1980	"Rock 'n' Roll Man"	—	Laughing in the Dark
1986	"Face to Face"	—	The Heartland
1987	"The Heartland"	—	The Heartland
1989	"Murmur of the Heart"	—	The Heartland

==== Other singles ====
List of singles as featured artist, with selected chart positions
Title	Year	Peak chart positions
Title	Year	AUS
"The Garden" (as Australia Too)	1985	22
