= Born Again Piss Tank =

Studio album by Kevin Bloody Wilson
- Released: October 1987
- Genre: Comedy/Australian humour
- Producer: Kevin Bloody Wilson

Kevin Bloody Wilson chronology
Kev's Back (The Return of the Yobbo) (1985)	Born Again Piss Tank (1987)	My Australian Roots (1989)

Born Again Piss Tank is an album by Australian singer/comedian Kevin Bloody Wilson. Released in October 1987, the album peaked at number 16 on the Australian album chart.

== Track listing ==
All tracks written by Denis Bryant.

1. "Born Again Piss Tank" - 5:33
2. "Kev's Love Song (Dinkum 'Bout Ya)" - 4:01
3. "Supa Mega Fugly" - 2:42
4. "Manuel the Bandito" - 3:57
5. "I Knew the Bride (When She Used to be a Moll)" - 4:12
6. "Fair & Just" - 3:13
7. "Anytime at All" - 2:44
8. "The Kid (He Swears a Little Bit)" - 5:52
9. "Dick On Her Mind" - 3:16
10. "Rootin' in the Back of the Ute" - 3:12

== Charts ==
Chart (1987/88)	Peak position
Australian (Kent Music Report)	16

== Certifications ==
Region	Certification	Certified units/sales
Australia (ARIA)	2× Platinum	140,000^{‡}
^{‡} Sales+streaming figures based on certification alone.
