= 1987 ARIA Music Awards =

Annual Australian music awards

- Date: 2 March 1987
- Venue: Sheraton Wentworth Hotel, Sydney, New South Wales

Highlights
- Most wins: John Farnham (6)
- Most nominations: John Farnham (10)
- Website: www.ariaawards.com.au

The First Australian Recording Industry Association Music Awards (generally known as the ARIA Music Awards or simply the ARIAs) was held on 2 March 1987 at the Sheraton Wentworth Hotel in Sydney with Elton John as the host. The awards were introduced by ARIA Chairman, Paul Turner, who explained the nomination and voting procedures. Presenters of the 20 awards included Slim Dusty, Basia Bonkowski and Donnie Sutherland. The ceremony was not televised. The most successful artist was John Farnham with his album (Whispering Jack) and its associated single, "You're the Voice" helping him win six awards.

== History ==
Countdown was an Australian pop music TV series on national broadcaster ABC-TV from 1974–1987, it presented music awards from 1979–1987, initially in conjunction with magazine TV Week which had sponsored the previously existing 'King of Pop' Awards. After Cold Chisel performed at the 1980 awards ceremony, and then trashed their instruments and the set, sponsors TV Week withdrew their support and Countdown held its own awards ceremonies until the 1986 awards which were broadcast in 1987. The awards ceremony was co-produced by Carolyn James (aka Carolyn Bailey) during 1981–1984 in collaboration with the Australian Recording Industry Association (ARIA), which provided peer voting for some awards. Countdown provided coupons in the related Countdown Magazine for viewers to vote for some awards including 'Most Popular Male Performer', 'Most Popular Female Performer', 'Most Popular Group' and 'Most Popular International Act'. At the 1985 awards ceremony (held in April 1986) fans of INXS and Uncanny X-Men scuffled and as a result ARIA decided to hold their own awards.

ARIA instituted its own entirely peer-voted Australian Record Industry Awards. The first awards ceremony was held on 2 March 1987 at the Sheraton Wentworth Hotel in Sydney with Elton John as the host. The awards were introduced by ARIA Chairman, Paul Turner, who explained the nomination and voting procedures. The eligibility period was for material released in the previous calendar year with the final five nominees determined by independent auditors, Deloitte, Haskin & Sells. Presenters of the 20 awards included John, Turner, promoter-manager Glenn Wheatley, Country music veteran Slim Dusty, Rock Around the World host Basia Bonkowski, and Sounds Unlimited host Donnie Sutherland. The 1987 ceremony was not televised, host John recommended that it not be televised in future:

if you want to keep these awards fun. The only reason I agreed to do this is because it's not on television. If, in future years, you keep it like that, I think it means something more because it's much more personal.

— Elton John

Anthony O'Grady, an Australian music journalist, cited ARIA founder and spokesperson Peter Rix, "Not that the first awards would have been allowed on TV ... The boys and girls really let their hair down that night – every acceptance speech was crammed with expletive-deletives." John Farnham was the most successful artist on the night, with his album Whispering Jack and its associated single, "You're the Voice" winning six awards from ten nominations.

== Awards and nominations ==
Winners are listed first and bolded, other final nominees (where known) are listed alphabetically.

=== ARIA Awards ===
- Album of the Year
  - **John Farnham –Whispering Jack**
    - Crowded House – Crowded House
    - Hunters & Collectors – Human Frailty
    - Paul Kelly & the Coloured Girls – Gossip
    - Spy vs Spy – A.O. Mod. TV. Vers.
- Single of the Year
  - **John Farnham – "You're the Voice"**
    - Crowded House – "Don't Dream It's Over"
    - Hunters & Collectors – "Say Goodbye"
    - INXS & Jimmy Barnes – "Good Times"
    - Paul Kelly & the Coloured Girls – "Before Too Long"
- Highest Selling Album
  - **John Farnham – Whispering Jack**
    - Dragon – Dreams of Ordinary Men
    - Icehouse - Measure for Measure
    - Kevin 'Bloody' Wilson – Kev's Back
    - Rodney Rude – Rude Rides Again
    - Spy vs Spy – A.O. Mod. TV. Vers.
    - Tim Finn – Big Canoe
- Highest Selling Single
  - **John Farnham – "You're the Voice"**
    - Boom Crash Opera – "Great Wall"
    - Do-Re-Mi – "Guns and Butter"
    - Dragon – "Dreams of Ordinary Men"
    - INXS & Jimmy Barnes – "Good Times"
    - Pseudo Echo – "Funky Town"
    - Wa Wa Nee – "Stimulation"
- Best Group
  - **INXS – "Listen Like Thieves"**
    - Crowded House – "Don't Dream It's Over"
    - Hunters & Collectors – Human Frailty
    - Midnight Oil – The Dead Heart
    - Pseudo Echo – "Funky Town"
- Best Female Artist
  - **Jenny Morris – "You're Gonna Get Hurt"**
    - Jean Stafford – Burning Bright
    - Jo Kennedy – The Pack of Women
    - Renée Geyer – Renée Live at the Basement
    - Wendy Matthews – "Dancing Daze"
- Best Male Artist
  - **John Farnham – Whispering Jack**
    - Jimmy Barnes – "Good Times"
    - Martin Plaza – Plaza Suite
    - Paul Kelly – Gossip
    - Tim Finn – Big Canoe
- Best New Talent
  - **Crowded House – "Don't Dream It's Over"**
    - Big Pig – "Hungry Town"
    - Boom Crash Opera – "Great Wall", "Hands up in the Air"
    - Ups and Downs – "The Living Kind"
    - Wa Wa Nee – "Stimulation"
- Best Country Album
  - **John Williamson – Mallee Boy**
    - Jean Stafford – Burning Bright
    - Johnny Chester – There's a Shadow on the Moon Tonight
    - Slim Dusty – Stories I Wanted to Tell
    - The Three Chord Wonders – Try Change
- Best Indigenous Release
  - **Coloured Stone – Human Love**
    - Dave de Hugard – The Magpie in the Wattle
    - John Williamson – Mallee Boy
    - Sirocco – Voyage
    - The Three Chord Wonders – Try Change
- Best Adult Contemporary Album
  - **John Farnham – Whispering Jack**
    - Dragon – Dreams of Ordinary Men
    - Mondo Rock – Boom Baby Boom
    - The Reels – "Bad Moon Rising"
    - Vince Jones – Tell Me a Secret
- Best Comedy Release
  - **Kevin 'Bloody' Wilson – Kev's Back**
    - Austen Tayshus – "Do the Pope"
    - Mary Kenneally, Steve Blackburn – Australia You're Standing In It
    - Rodney Rude – Rude Rides Again
    - Vince Sorrenti – Unbelievable

=== Fine Arts Awards ===
- Best Jazz Album
  - **The George Golla Orchestra – Lush Life**
    - Dick Hughes – The Last Train for Casablanca Leaves Once in a Blue Moon
    - Maree Montgomery – Woman of Mystery
    - Various Artists – The Esso Australian Jazz Summit
    - Vince Jones – Tell Me a Secret
- Best Classical Album
  - **Barry Conyngham – Southern Cross / Ice Carving**
    - Australian Chamber Orchestra – Mozart in Delphi
    - Grant Foster – Rhapsody for Piano and Orchestra
    - Robert Allworth - Last Look at Bronte
    - Sydney University Chamber Choir – The Victoria Requiem
- Best Original Soundtrack / Cast / Show Recording
  - **Robyn Archer – The Pack of Women**
    - Martin Armiger – Dancing Daze
    - Nathan Waks – For Love Alone
    - Peter Best – "Crocodile" Dundee
    - Peter Carey, Martin Armiger – Illusion

=== Artisan Awards ===
- Best Songwriter
  - **Neil Finn – Crowded House – "Mean to Me", "Don't Dream It's Over", "Now We're Getting Somewhere"**
    - Eric McCusker – Mondo Rock – "Rule of Three", John Farnham – "No One Comes Close"
    - Garry Gary Beers, Andrew Farriss, Jon Farriss, Tim Farriss, Michael Hutchence, Kirk Pengilly – INXS – "Listen Like Thieves"
    - Paul Gray – Wa Wa Nee – "Stimulation", "I Could Make You Love Me"
    - Paul Kelly – "Before Too Long"
- Producer of the Year
  - **Mark Opitz – Models – Models' Media, The Reels – "Bad Moon Rising", INXS & Jimmy Barnes – "Good Times", Noiseworks – No Lies, Jump Incorporated – "Sex and Fame"**
    - Alan Thorne – Paul Kelly & the Coloured Girls – Gossip
    - Brian Canham – Pseudo Echo – "Funky Town"
    - Charles Fisher – Tango Bravo – "Blood Is the Colour", The Cockroaches – "Wait Up", Martin Plaza – Plaza Suite
    - Ross Fraser – John Farnham – Whispering Jack, John Justin – "Flash King Cadillac"
- Engineer of the Year
  - **Alan Wright – Jump Incorporated – "Sex and Fame"**
    - Doug Brady – John Farnham – Whispering Jack
    - Guy Gray – Flotsam Jetsam – Show Me
    - Jim Taig – Wa Wa Nee – Wa Wa Nee
    - John Bee – Doug Mulray & the Rude Band – "You Are Soul"
- Best Video
  - **Alex Proyas – Crowded House – "Don't Dream It's Over"**
    - Alex Proyas – INXS – "Kiss the Dirt"
    - Julie Stone Productions – Big Pig – "Hungry Town"
    - Kimble Rendall – Boom Crash Opera – "Hands up in the Air"
    - Tony Leitch, Andrew de Groot – Hunters & Collectors – "Everything's on Fire"
- Best Cover Art
  - **Oleh Witer – Big Pig – Big Pig**
    - Art Scarff – Australian Crawl – The Final Wave
    - Buster Stiggs – Pseudo Echo – Love an Adventure
    - Nick Seymour – Crowded House – Crowded House
    - Richard Alan – Models – Models' Media; I'm Talking – Bear Witness
    - Steve Malpass – John Farnham – Whispering Jack

== Multiple nominations and awards ==
Artists who received multiple nominations
Nominations	Artist
10	John Farnham
7	Crowded House
6	INXS
5	Paul Kelly
4	Jimmy Barnes
4	Hunters & Collectors
4	Pseudo Echo
4	Wa Wa Nee
3	Big Pig
3	Boom Crash Opera
3	Dragon
2	Martin Armiger
2	Tim Finn
2	Vince Jones
2	Jump Incorporated
2	Models
2	Mondo Rock
2	Martin Plaza
2	Alex Proyas
2	The Reels
2	Rodney Rude
2	Spy vs Spy
2	Jean Stafford
2	The Three Chord Wonders
2	John Williamson
2	Kevin Bloody Wilson

Artists who received multiple awards
Wins	Artist
6	John Farnham
3	Crowded House
2	INXS
2	Jump Incorporated
