= Breakaway (Big Pig song) =

1973 song by Chuck Jackson

"I Can't Break Away"

Song by Chuck Jackson

from the album Through All Times
- B-side: "Just a Little Tear"
- Released: 1973
- Length: 3:36
- Label: Probe; ABC
- Songwriters: Mitchell Bottler; Gary Zekley
- Producer: Steve Barri

Chuck Jackson singles chronology
"I Only Get This Feeling" (1973)	"I Can't Break Away" (1973)	"Maybe This Will Be the Morning" (1974)

"Breakaway"

Single by Big Pig

from the album Bonk
- B-side: "Hellbent Heaven"; "The Bald Dwarf"
- Released: November 2, 1987
- Length: 3:38
- Label: White Label; Mushroom
- Songwriters: Mitchell Bottler; Gary Zekley
- Producer: Nick Launay

Big Pig singles chronology
"Boy Wonder" (1987)	"Breakaway" (1987)	"Big Hotel" (1988)

Audio
- "Breakaway" on YouTube

"Breakaway", by Australian band Big Pig, is a cover of American R&B singer Chuck Jackson's song "I Can't Break Away". Originally released on November 2, 1987, in the United Kingdom, it was released on February 15, 1988, in Australia as the third single from their debut album Bonk. The song, written by Mitchell Bottler and Gary Zekley, is about freedom and fighting against destiny. Like many other Big Pig songs, "Breakaway" features plentiful drums and percussion but no guitars.

The song became the band's most successful single, reaching number one in New Zealand in May 1988. It also reached number eight in their native Australia and charted in North America, reaching number 60 on the US Billboard Hot 100 and number 10 on Canada's RPM 100 Singles chart. Its earlier UK release saw the song peak at number 89 on the UK Singles Chart.

In 1989, the song appeared on the soundtrack to the science-fiction comedy film Bill & Ted's Excellent Adventure, also appearing in the film's opening credits.

== Reception ==
In 2004, Clem Bastow of Stylus Magazine wrote that while Big Pig's "Breakaway" is likely "the least 'rock' of all the songs from Excellent Adventure," it incites a sense of excitement. He added that the song is "a dodgy, quasi-deep (see: made up language) throwaway hit" from an otherwise obscure band clad in matching dresses, "yet doesn't that line, 'All my life I’ve wanted to fly/Like the birds that you see way up in the sky', set to that pulsating proto-industrial clang, tap into that universal wish for freedom, for super-human powers, for that which we cannot have? The answer is, of course, yes."

== Track listings ==
White Label Records 7-inch single

1. "Breakaway" – 3:45
2. "Hellbent Heaven" – 3:33

White Label Records 12-inch maxi-single

1. "Breakaway" (Popper mix) – 6:02
2. "The Bald Dwarf"
3. "Breakaway" – 3:30

== Charts ==
=== Chuck Jackson version ===
Chart (1974)	Peak position
US Hot Soul Singles (Billboard)	62

=== Big Pig version ===
==== Weekly charts ====
Chart (1987–1988)	Peak position
Australia (Australian Music Report)	8
Canada Top Singles (RPM)	10
New Zealand (Recorded Music NZ)	1
UK Singles (Official Charts)	89
US Billboard Hot 100	60
US 12-inch Singles Sales (Billboard)	16
US Dance Club Play (Billboard)	7

==== Year-end charts ====
Chart (1988)	Position
Australia (ARIA)	37
New Zealand (RIANZ)	12

== Release history ==
Region	Date	Format(s)	Label(s)	Ref.
United Kingdom	November 2, 1987	7-inch vinyl; 12-inch vinyl	A&M	
Australia	February 15, 1988	7-inch vinyl; cassette	White Label; Mushroom	
