= Kev's Back (The Return of the Yobbo) =

Studio album by Kevin Bloody Wilson
- Released: 1985
- Genre: Comedy/Australian humour
- Label: Both Barrels Music
- Producer: Kevin Bloody Wilson

Kevin Bloody Wilson chronology
Your Average Australian Yobbo (1984)	Kev's Back (The Return of the Yobbo) (1985)	Born Again Piss Tank (1987)

Kev's Back (The Return of the Yobbo) is the second album by the bawdy Australian singer/comedian Kevin Bloody Wilson. The album won the first ever ARIA Award for "Best Comedy Release" and was nominated for "Highest Selling Album". The album includes what is claimed by critics to be overtly racist humour.

The song, "Living Next Door to Alan", is a parody of New World's "Living Next Door to Alice", and is about an Indigenous family claiming land next door to millionaire Alan Bond.

== Track listing ==
All tracks written by Dennis Bryant.

1. "The Last Lager Waltz"
2. "That's What He Really Said"
3. "Kev's Courtin' Song"
4. "Breathe Through My Ears"
5. "Mick the Master Farter"
6. "Living Next Door To Alan"
7. "The Pubic Hair Song"
8. "It Was Over" (Kev's Lament)
9. "Dick'taphone"
10. "Hey Santa Claus"

== Charts ==
=== Weekly charts ===
Chart (1985–87)	Peak position
Australian Albums (Kent Music Report)	20
New Zealand Albums (RMNZ)	3

=== Year-end charts ===
Chart (1986)	Position
Australian Albums (Kent Music Report)	11
Chart (1987)	Position
New Zealand Albums (RMNZ)	25

== Certifications ==
Region	Certification	Certified units/sales
Australia (ARIA)	4× Platinum	280,000^{‡}
^{‡} Sales+streaming figures based on certification alone.
