= Jump Incorporated =

Australian musical group

- Origin: Sydney, New South Wales, Australia
- Genres: Rock
- Years active: 1985–1987
- Label: Mushroom/Festival
- Spinoff of: Moving Parts; the Sirens
- Past members: Geoff Gray; Martin Sinkovic; Nada Sinkovic; Mark Woods; Lee Borkman; Finbar O'Hanlon

Jump Incorporated was an Australian rock band founded in 1985 by Geoff Gray (bass guitar, vocals), Martin Sinkovic (drums, vocals), his sister Nada Sinkovic (keyboards, vocals) and Mark Woods (guitar, vocals). All four were members of Moving Parts and Sirens. In late 1986, they added Lee Borkman (keyboards) and Finbar O'Hanlon (lead guitar). They released one full-length album, Push Push One Day Too Far, in 1986. Their first single, "Sex and Fame", was produced by Mark Opitz and engineered by Alan Wright. Opitz won the 1987 ARIA Music Award for Producer of the Year for this single and four other releases. Alan won the award for Engineer of the Year for this single.

== History ==
Jump Incorporated was formed in 1985 in Sydney by Geoff Gray on bass guitar and vocals, Martin Sinkovic on drums and vocals, his sister Nada Sinkovic on keyboards and vocals and Mark Woods on lead guitar and vocals. The group evolved from a school-based band Moving Parts formed in 1978, which included Gray, Martin and Woods – all from Camden High School – as a dance pop group. In the following year, Nada joined but it disbanded in 1980. The band reconvened in 1983 but name confusion with a rival Australian group, Moving Pictures, resulted in another change to the Sirens before they settled for Jump Incorporated as a rock band.

The group signed to Mushroom Records and Mark Opitz produced the first single, "Sex and Fame", which was issued in January 1986. The Australian musicologist Ian McFarlane described its sonation as "mixed heavy guitars, anthemic choruses and glam-rock sleaze over a throbbing disco beat". It peaked at No. 32 on the Australian Kent Music Report singles chart. At the 1987 ARIA Music Awards Opitz won Producer of the Year for "Sex and Fame" and four other releases, while Wright won Engineer of the Year for his work on that single.

Jump Incorporated's only studio album, Push Push One Day Too Far, appeared in 1986 and was also produced by Opitz. Three singles were released from it, "Never Needed You More" (September 1986), "Turn It On" (April 1987) and "Jagged" (June 1987). The line-up was augmented in late 1986 by Lee Borkman on keyboards and Finbar O'Hanlen on lead guitar. The band continued for a year before disbanding.

== Discography ==
=== Studio album ===
Title	Album details
Push Push One Day Too Far	Released: 1986; Format: LP, CD, cassette; Label: Mushroom (L 38646)

=== Singles ===
List of singles, with selected chart positions
Year	Title	Peak chart positions	Album
Year	Title	AUS	Album
1986	"Sex and Fame"	32	Push Push One Day Too Far
1986	"Never Needed You More"	-	Push Push One Day Too Far
1987	"Turn It On"	-	Push Push One Day Too Far
1987	"Jagged"	-	Push Push One Day Too Far
