= Trustworthy Little Sweethearts =

Studio album by Vince Jones
- Released: February 1989
- Studio: Metropolis Studios, Melbourne, Australia
- Genre: Jazz
- Length: 53:55
- Label: EMI Music
- Producer: Doug De Vries

Vince Jones chronology
It All Ends Up in Tears (1987)	Trustworthy Little Sweethearts (1989)	Come in Spinner (1990)

Trustworthy Little Sweethearts is the seventh studio album by Australian jazz musician Vince Jones, released in February 1989 and peaked at number 42 on the ARIA Charts.

At the ARIA Music Awards of 1990 the album was nominated for ARIA Award for Best Jazz Album.

== Track listing ==
1. "Big City" (Marvin Jenkins) - 3:54
2. "Trustworthy Little Sweethearts" (Vince Jones, Doug de Vries)- 4:17
3. "Stricken By a Storm" (Vince Jones) - 4:03
4. "I'm a Fool to Want You" (Joel Herron, Frank Sinatra, Jack Wolf) - 6:20
5. "That Old Feeling" (Lew Brown, Sammy Fain) - 3:32
6. "My Only Friend" (Vince Jones, Doug de Vries) - 3:17
7. "In an Attempt to Be Fascinating" (Vince Jones, Doug de Vries) - 4:30
8. "I Didn't Know What Time It Was" (Lorenz Hart, Richard Rodgers) - 5:53
9. "Not Much" (Vince Jones, Doug de Vries) - 4:34
10. "Turned Around" (Vince Jones, Doug de Vries) - 3:07
11. "The Masquerade Is Over" (Herbert Magidson, Allie Wrubel) - 4:50

== Charts ==
Chart (1989)	Peak position
Australian Albums (ARIA)	42
