= Bonk (album) =

Studio album by Big Pig
- Released: May 1988
- Recorded: 1987
- Studios: Metropolis, Melbourne; Rhinoceros, Sydney, Australia^{[A]}
- Genre: Rock
- Length: 43:11
- Label: White Label
- Producer: Nick Launay

Big Pig chronology
Big Pig (1986)	Bonk (1988)	You Lucky People (1990)

Singles from Bonk
- 1. "Boy Wonder" Released: April 1987; 2. "Breakaway" Released: February 1988; 3. "Big Hotel" Released: June 1988; 4. "Iron Lung" Released: December 1988

Professional ratings
Review scores
Source	Rating
AllMusic	3/5 stars

Bonk is the debut studio album by Australian rock band Big Pig. It was released in May 1988 on White Label Records and peaked at number 5 on The Australian charts. The album was released in America by A&M Records in 1988. It was produced by Nick Launay. "Breakaway" was featured on the Bill & Ted's Excellent Adventure soundtrack.

== Track listing ==
All songs written by O. Witer, A. Scaglione, N. Disbray, and S. Abeyratne, except where noted, according to Australasian Performing Right Association (APRA).

1. "Iron Lung" - 3:34
2. "Hungry Town" - 3:06
3. "Tin Drum" - 4:22
4. "Breakaway" (Gary Zekley, Mitch Bottler) - 3:38
5. "Big Hotel" - 3:26
6. "Boy Wonder" (O. Witer, A. Scaglione, N. Disbray and T. Rosewarne) - 4:14
7. "Hellbent Heaven" (O. Witer, S. Abeyratne, A Antoniades and N. Baker) - 3:27
8. "Nation" - 3:34
9. "Charlie" - 4:03
10. "Fine Thing" - 3:22
11. "Money God" - 4:28
12. "Devil's Song" - 5:27
13. "Breakaway" (Popper Mix) (Zekley, Bottler) - 6:01
14. "Hungry Town" (Grub Club Mix) - 6:27

== Charts ==
=== Weekly charts ===
Chart (1988)	Position
Australia (Kent Music Report) Albums Chart	5
Canada Top Albums/CDs (RPM)	27
New Zealand Albums (RMNZ)	2

=== Year-end charts ===
Chart (1988)	Position
Australian Albums Chart (ARIA Charts)	18

== Certifications ==
Region	Certification	Certified units/sales
Australia (ARIA)	Platinum	70,000^{^}
^{^} Shipments figures based on certification alone.

== Personnel ==
Credited to:

Big Pig

- Tony Antoniades - Harmonica, Vocals
- Neil Baker - Drums
- Nick Disbray - Percussion, Vocals
- Tim Rosewarne - Keyboards, Vocals
- Adrian Scaglione - Drums
- Sherine Abeyratne - Percussion, Vocals
- Oleh Witer - Drums, Vocals

Additional musicians

- Jim Benning - Guitar
- Mike Tyler - Guitar, Bass guitar
- Al Colman - Bass guitar
- Como String Quartet - Strings (Track 9)

Recording details

- Producer — Nick Launay
- Engineer — Nick Launay
  - Assistants — Heidi Cannave^{[A]}, Noel Haris, Michael Wickow
- Mixer — Nick Launay

Art work

- Art Direction & Design - Oleh Witer, Jeremy Pearce
- Photography — Eric Watson
- Video Photography - Eric Watson, Robert Ogilvie

Notes

- A "Boy Wonder" was recorded in Sydney separately to the album which was recorded in Melbourne, Nick Launay was assisted by Heidi Cannova on this track
