= Graeme Connors =

Australian country music singer, songwriter, and performer (born 1956)

- Born: 29 April 1956 (age 70); Mackay, Queensland, Australia
- Occupations: Singer; songwriter; composer; musician
- Years active: 1974–present

Graeme Connors (born 29 April 1956) is an Australian country music singer, songwriter, and performer. Connors has released seventeen studio albums and has received fourteen Golden Guitar awards among other prestige Australian country music awards.

In 2009 as part of the Q150 celebrations, Graeme Connors was announced as one of the Q150 Icons of Queensland for his role as an "Influential Artists".

In 2016, Connors was inducted into the Australian Roll of Renown.

== Career ==
=== 1965-1987: Early career ===
Connors attended school St. Patricks in Mackay. Connors commenced his music career in the mid-1970s doing support vocals for many well-known acts of the day.

In 1974, at the age of 18, Connors opened for American singer/songwriter, Kris Kristofferson during his Australian tour. Kristofferson was so impressed with young Connors, that he took him into the recording studio to produce his 1976 debut album And When Morning Comes.

From the late 1970s through to the late 1980s, Connors wrote songs that became big hits for Slim Dusty, John Denver and Jon English.

Connors spent the first half of the 1980s writing songs based on truck driving which became hits for Slim Dusty such as "I'm Married to My Bulldog Mack" and "Dieseline Dreams".

=== The 1987-present ===
In 1988, Connors had recorded and released the breakthrough single "A Little Further North", featured on his first album on the Australian ABC Records label, North. Subsequent singles followed with the releases of "Let the Canefields Burn", "Cyclone Season", "Sicilian Born" and "A Heartache (Or Two)".

In 1995, Connors released the album The Here and Now and won three golden guitars at the CMAA Awards, including Album of the Year.

In 1995, Connors won MO Award for Male Country Performer of the Year and was Inducted into the Hands of Fame.

In 1998, Connors wrote the Cowboys theme song "The Cowboys are my Team".

In 2000, Connors performed at both the opening and closing ceremonies for the 2000 Paralympics and he wrote their theme song "Being Here".

In 2011, Connors was awarded Album of the Year at the 2011 Tamworth Country Music Festival for Still Walking.

== Discography ==
=== Studio albums ===
List of studio albums, with selected chart positions and certifications
Title	Album details	Peak chart positions	Certifications
Title	Album details	AUS	Certifications
And When Morning Comes	Released: 1976; Label: Festival Records (L35794); Format: LP	-	
North	Released: April 1988; Label: ABC Music (479593-2); Format: CD, LP	73	ARIA: Platinum
South of These Days	Released: late 1989; Label: ABC Music (479614-2); Format: CD, LP	114	
Tropicali	Released: September 1991; Label: ABC Music (510307-2); Format: CD, LP	121	
The Return	Released: March 1993; Label: ABC Music (514511-2); Format: CD, Cassette	90	
Homeland	Released: January 1994; Label: The Panama Music Company (423576-2); Format: CD, Cassette	126	
The Here and Now	Released: May 1995; Label: ABC Country (489119-2); Format: CD, Cassette	157	
The Road Less Travelled	Released: August 1996; Label: ABC Country (489598-2); Format: CD, Cassette	62	ARIA: Gold
One of the Family	Released: September 1997; Label: ABC Country; Format: CD, Cassette	177	
A Delicate Balance	Released: June 1999; Label: ABC Country (520795 2); Format: CD, Cassette	94	
This Is Life	Released: April 2002; Label: ABC Country (12352); Format: CD	60	
The Moment	Released: June 2004; Label: ABC Country (13822); Format: CD, digital	146	
The Last Supperteers (with The Fiddler's Feast)	Released: August 2007; Label: Panama Music (70510518819); Format: CD, Digital download	-	
Still Walking	Released: August 2010; Label: Panama Music (1794200015); Format: CD, Digital download	-	
At the Speed of Life	Released: August 2011; Label: Panama Music (1794200017); Format: CD, Digital download	-	
Kindred Spirit	Released: January 2013; Label: Panama Music (1794200018); Format: CD, Digital download	-	
From the Backcountry	Released: 3 August 2018; Label: Panama Music (1794200018); Format: CD, Digital download	31	
What Next	Released: August 2026; Label: Panama Music; Format: CD, Digital download	-	

=== Live albums ===
List of live albums, with selected details
Title	Album details
#1 Hits Live	Released: May 2018; Label: Panama Music; Format: Digital download, streaming

=== Compilation albums ===
List of compilation, with selected chart positions and certifications
Title	Album details	Peak chart positions	Certifications
Title	Album details	AUS	Certifications
The Best... Til' Now	Released: September 2000; Label: ABC Music (520795-2); Format: CD	45	ARIA: Gold
It's All Good... More of the Best	Released: August 2006; Label: Panama Music (1794200013); Format: CD	165	
60 Summers – The Ultimate Collection	Released: 29 April 2016; Label: ABC Music (4785233); Format: 2xCD, digital	11	

=== Charted singles ===
List of charted singles in the ARIA top 200, with selected chart positions
Title	Year	Chart positions
Title	Year	AUS
"A Little Further North"	1988	125
"Cyclone Season"	1989	135
"Helpless Heart"	1993	166
"Prodigal Son"	1993	194

== Awards and nominations ==
=== AIR Awards ===
The Australian Independent Record Awards (commonly known informally as AIR Awards) is an annual awards night to recognise, promote and celebrate the success of Australia's Independent Music sector.

Year	Nominee / work	Award	Result
2012	At the Speed of Life	Best Independent Country Album	Nominated

=== APRA Awards ===
The APRA Awards are held in Australia and New Zealand by the Australasian Performing Right Association to recognise songwriting skills, sales and airplay performance by its members annually. Connors has won three awards from seven nominations.

Year	Nominee / work	Award	Result
1986	"I'm Married To My Bulldog Mack" (written by Graeme Connors / Doug Trevor)	Most Performed Australasian Country Work	Won
1990	"A Little Further North Each Year" (written by Graeme Connors)	Most Performed Australasian Country Work	Won
1998	"Road Less Travelled" by Graeme Connors (written by Graeme Connors)	Most Performed Australasian Country Work	Nominated
1998	"These Uncertain Times" by Graeme Connors (written by Graeme Connors)	Most Performed Australasian Country Work	Nominated
2002	"Good Things in Life" by Adam Brand (written by Adam Brand & Graeme Connors)	Most Performed Australasian Country Work	Nominated

=== ARIA Music Awards ===
The ARIA Music Awards is an annual awards ceremony that recognises excellence, innovation, and achievement across all genres of Australian music. Connors has won one award from four nominations.

Year	Nominee / work	Award	Result
1992	Tropicali	Best Country Album	Nominated
1994	The Return	Best Country Album	Nominated
1996	The Here and Now	Best Country Album	Nominated
1997	The Road Less Travelled	Best Country Album	Won

=== Country Music Awards (CMAA) ===
Connors has won fourteen Golden guitar awards at the Tamworth Country Music Awards of Australia and was inducted into the Australian Roll of Renown.

- Note: Wins Only

Year	Nominee / work	Award	Result
1989	"We've Done Us Proud" (recorded by Slim Dusty)	Song of the Year	Won
1995	"Songs from the Homeland"	Song of the Year	Won
1995	Homeland	Album of the Year	Won
1995	Homeland	Male Vocalist of the Year	Won
1996	"The Great Australian Dream"	Song of the Year	Won
1996	"Slowly But Surely" (with Rosemary Rae)	Vocal Collaboration of the Year	Won
1996	"The Ringer and the Princess"	Bush Ballad Heritage Song	Won
1996	"The Great Australian Dream"	Video Track of the Year	Won
1997	The Road Less Travelled	Album of the Year	Won
1997	"The Road Less Travelled"	Male Vocalist of the Year	Won
2001	"Good Things in Life" (recorded by Adam Brand)	Song of the Year	Won
2004	"The Simple Truth"	Video Track of the Year	Won
2011	"A Good Life"	Male Artist of the Year	Won
2011	Still Walking	Album of the Year	Won
2017	himself	Australian Roll of Renown	inductee

=== Mo Awards ===
The Australian Entertainment Mo Awards (commonly known informally as the Mo Awards), were annual Australian entertainment industry awards. They recognise achievements in live entertainment in Australia from 1975 to 2016. Graeme Connors won two awards in that time.

Year	Nominee / work	Award	Result (wins only)
1994	Graeme Connors	Male Country Entertainer of the Year	Won
1996	Graeme Connors	Male Country Entertainer of the Year	Won

=== Tamworth Songwriters Awards ===
The Tamworth Songwriters Association (TSA) is an annual songwriting contest for original country songs, awarded in January at the Tamworth Country Music Festival. They commenced in 1986. Graeme Connors won nine awards in that time.

Year	Nominee / work	Award	Result (wins only)
1992	Graeme Connors	Songmaker Award	Won
1994	"Prodigal Son"	Contemporary Song of the Year	Won
1994	"Prodigal Son"	Country Song of the Year	Won
1995	"Songs from the Homeland"	Contemporary Song of the Year	Won
1996	"The Great Australian Dream"	Contemporary Song of the Year	Won
1997	"The Road Less Travelled"	Contemporary Song of the Year	Won
1998	"I Believe in Santa Claus"	Children's Song of the Year	Won
1998	"One Child Born"	Gospel Song of the Year	Won
2000	"These Uncertain Times"	Contemporary Song of the Year	Won

=== Other Awards ===
- 1975 American Song Festival Award
- 1976 American Song Festival Award
- 2000 Victorian Country Music Awards - Song of the Year "These Uncertain Times"
- 2005 Victorian Country Music Awards - Song of the Year "Hard Decisions"
- 2009 Q150 Queensland Icon Award
- 2011 WARP Gold Medallion Award (Queensland Male Vocalist of the Year)
