= I Don't Want to Cry! =

I Don't Want to Cry

Studio album by Chuck Jackson
- Released: 1961
- Recorded: Fall 1960 (title song November 1960)
- Genre: Pop, R&B
- Label: Wand

Chuck Jackson chronology
I Don't Want to Cry (1961)	Any Day Now (1962)

Professional ratings
Review scores
Source	Rating
AllMusic	4/5 stars
The Encyclopedia of Popular Music	3/5 stars

I Don't Want to Cry! is Chuck Jackson's debut studio album, released in 1961. The album is completely devoted to songs about crying.

Jackson co-wrote the title track. It became a Top 40 Pop hit and a Top 5 R&B hit.

The album's design and photography was by Jules Maidoff.

== Critical reception ==
AllMusic wrote that the "hit title cut serves as a springboard to explore 11 other tear-stained tunes, forming a concept record detailing the many subtle gradations of melancholy and heartbreak."

== Track listing ==
=== Side 1 ===
1. "I Don't Want to Cry" (Luther Dixon, Chuck Jackson)
2. "Tears on My Pillow" (Al Lewis, Sylvester Bradford)
3. "My Willow Tree" (Bob Elgin, Kay Rogers)
4. "In Between Tears" (Bob Elgin, Kay Rogers, Luther Dixon)
5. "Tear of the Year" (Gary Geld, Peter Udell)
6. "I Cried for You" (Abe Lyman, Arthur Freed, Gus Arnheim)

=== Side 2 ===
1. "Lonely Teardrops" (Berry Gordy, Jr., Tryan Carlo)
2. "Don't Let the Sun Catch You Crying" (Joe Greene)
3. "Salty Tears" (Lincoln Chase)
4. "I Wake Up Crying" (Burt Bacharach, Hal David)
5. "A Tear" (Luther Dixon, Willie Denson)
6. "A Man Ain't Supposed to Cry" (Frankie Laine, Irving Reid, Norman Gimbel)

== See also ==
- I Don't Want to Cry! on Discogs
