= Provenance (album) =

Studio album by Vince Jones and Paul Grabowsky
- Released: October 2015
- Label: ABC Jazz

Vince Jones chronology
The Monash Sessions (2014)	Provenance (2015)	A Personal Selection (2019)

Paul Grabowsky chronology
Spiel (2015)	Provenance (2015)	Nyilipidgi (2016)

Provenance is a collaborative studio album by Australian recording artists Vince Jones and Paul Grabowsky, released in October 2015.

Jones and Grabowsky first worked together in the 1980s, when Grabowsky was music director to Jones. Provenance marks a renewed collaboration between the pair after several decades apart. The title describes the music which the duo chose to record: ballads that showcase the essential elements of their craft, elements that have been the foundations of their careers, pared down to the intimate combination of piano and voice (and occasionally piano and flumpet – a hybrid of trumpet and flugelhorn).

At the ARIA Music Awards of 2016 it won the ARIA Award for Best Jazz Album.

At the AIR Awards of 2017, it was nominated for Best Independent Jazz Album.

== Track listing ==
1. "Rainbow Cake" - 4:38
2. "Oh My Love" - 4:56
3. "We've Only Just Begun" - 4:43
4. "Stella by Starlight" - 4:31
5. "If You Never Come to Me" - 4:37
6. "Each Other's Child" - 3:32
7. "May I Come in?" - 4:15
8. "Between Your Eyes" - 4:01
9. "So" - 4:15
10. "This is Always" - 4:18
11. "The Parting Glass" - 4:55

== Charts ==
=== Year-end charts ===
Chart (2015)	Position
Australian Top Jazz & Blues Albums (ARIA)	24
Chart (2016)	Position
Australian Top Jazz & Blues Albums (ARIA)	41
