= My Australian Roots =

Studio album by Kevin Bloody Wilson
- Released: June 1989
- Genre: Comedy/Australian humour
- Length: 42:09
- Label: Both Barrels Music
- Producer: Kevin Bloody Wilson

Kevin Bloody Wilson chronology
| Born Again Piss Tank (1987) | My Australian Roots (1989) | The Lovable Larrikin (best of) (1990) |

My Australian Roots is a 1989 album by Australian rude singer/comedian Kevin Bloody Wilson. The album was nominated for the ARIA Award for Best Comedy Release in 1990.

== Track listing ==
All tracks written by Denis Bryant.

1. "You Orta' See Me (When I'm Pissed)" – 3:36
2. "Double Decker Dog" – 4:26
3. "The Great Roberto" – 5:05
4. "Me Dick's on the Dole" – 2:43
5. "The Featherbrain Championship" – 4:19
6. "The First Six Rows" – 3:35
7. "Ollie and Olga" – 3:11
8. "You Can Never Find One" – 2:35
9. "Flowers" – 3:05
10. "The Builder" – 3:18
11. "Amazing Grass" – 5:40

== Charts ==
Chart performance for My Australian Roots
| Chart (1989) | Peak position |
|---|---|
| Australian Albums (ARIA) | 25 |
