= The Garden (Australia Too song) =

Single by Australia Too
- Released: 26 August 1985
- Recorded: 1985
- Studio: Albert Studios, Sydney
- Genre: Pop
- Length: 5:54
- Label: Albert Productions
- Songwriter: Alan Caswell
- Producer: Rod Coe

"The Garden" is a charity single, recorded by the Australia supergroup Australia Too. All Proceeds went to Freedom from Hunger in Ethiopia. The song peaked at number 38 on the Australian singles chart.

At the 1986 Country Music Awards of Australia, it won APRA Song of the Year. At the APRA Music Awards of 1987, the song won Most Performed Australasian Country Work.

== Artists and musicians ==
=== Artists that sang on the record ===
Laurie Allen, Dave Allenby, Serina Andrew, Johnny Ashcroft, Lissa Barnum, Kevin Bennett, Keith Blinman, Bobby Bright, Alan Caswell, Stuart Cowell, Smoky Dawson, Leanne Douglas, Pat Drummond, Jon English, Mort Fist, Renée Geyer, Eric Grothe, Mick Hamilton, Alan Hawking, Wayne Horsburgh, Bob Hudson, Marc Hunter, Karen Johns, Dan Johnson, Col Joye, Genni Kane, Gay Kayler, Jan Kelly, Kevin King, Sally King, Anne Kirkpatrick, Roger Knox, Vic Lanyon, Darcy Leyear, Rose Marie, Lawrie Minson, Mike McClellan, Nev Nicholls, Sharon O'Neill, Doug Parkinson, Gordon Parsons, Reg Poole, Bob Purtell, Bruni Riley, Doug Rowe, Alex Smith, Terry Smith, Ivy Somerfield, Don Spencer, Jean Stafford, Judy Stone, John Swan, Buck Taylor, Kathy Thomson, John Wallis, Manny West and Sand Williams.

=== Musicians that performed on the record ===
Charlie Boyter, Bob Butler, Roger Corbett, Jimmy Duke-Yonge, Russell Dunlop, Phil Emmanuel, Tommy Emmanuel, Mick Hamilton, Marcus Holden, Leon Isackson, Phil Jenkins, Johnny Marshall, Lawrie Minson, Hugh McDonald, Doug Rowe, Ian Simpson and Darcy Wright.

== Track listing ==
7" (AP-1568)

- Side A "The Garden" - 5:54
- Side B "One Family World" (Slim Dusty) - 3:03

== Charts ==
Chart (1985)	Peak position
Australia (Kent Music Report)	38
