= Kevin Bloody Wilson =

Australian comic singer-songwriter (born 1947)

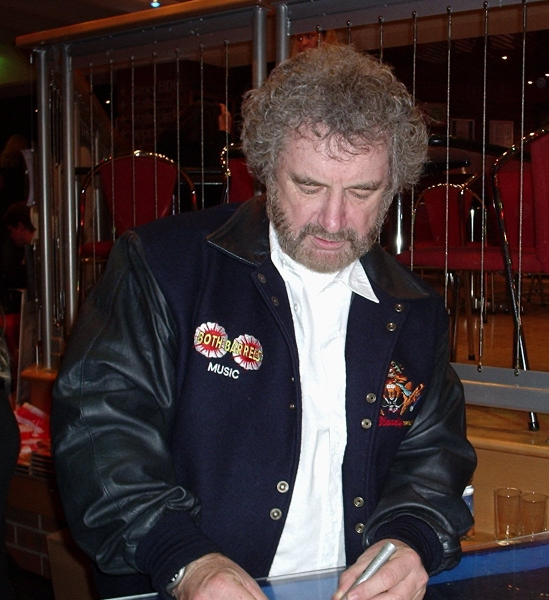
- Kevin Bloody Wilson signing an autograph after a performance on the 2005 DILLIGAF Tour

Background information
- Also known as: Kevin Bloody Wilson
- Born: Dennis Bryant; 13 February 1947 (age 79); Bathurst, New South Wales
- Origin: Australian
- Genres: country rap, comedy hip hop
- Occupations: Comedian, satirist, parodist, singer-songwriter,
- Instruments: Vocals, guitar
- Years active: 1977-present
- Formerly of: Bryan Dennis and the Country Club
- Website: http://www.kevinbloodywilson.com/

Kevin Bloody Wilson (born Dennis Bryant; 13 February 1947) is an Australian musical comedian who performs comical songs with his heavy Australian accent and often including sexual themes. He has won one ARIA Music Award.

== Early career ==
Bryant was born in Bathurst, although he identifies with Kalgoorlie, Western Australia, where he was an electrician in the gold mines.

In the 1970s, Bryant fronted his own band called 'Bryan Dennis and the Country Club'. He also used the name 'Bryan Dennis' when he hosted a country music show on radio 6KG in Kalgoorlie from 1973 to 1980, before he was thrown off air for playing the parody song, "I'm Heaving on a Jet Plane".

He moved to Perth and began playing bawdy songs as a hobby, singing at pubs and Australian rules football clubs. He had adopted the name Kevin Bloody Wilson by 1984, when he put together a cassette of his songs called Your Average Australian Yobbo, which he sold at gigs and by mail order. He managed to sell 22,000 copies of the cassette before it was eventually transferred to LP, where it went on to sell many thousands more.

He is one of Perth's most famous comedians. His humour is regarded by media commentators as politically incorrect. As one of Australia's most successful comedians, he continues to tour and performs an average of 120 concerts worldwide each year.

Wilson is married and his wife Betty comes on tour with him. She sells merchandise at shows and has appeared on guest vocals in a few of his songs, including "Dick'taphone".

Wilson appeared on the popular television show Enough Rope with Andrew Denton in October 2008. On the show, he told of how he met his wife Betty, who was originally from Kalgoorlie, but lived in Perth at the time they met. She had returned to the town to visit friends and her brother who still lived there and they met when she attended one of his shows. Betty, who was in the studio audience, told Denton that Wilson was a romantic who regularly bought her flowers.

"The Genie in the Bottle", a country song which Wilson co-wrote with Adam Harvey, reaching the number one video spot on the Country Music Television Channel in 2008.

== Discography ==
=== Studio albums ===
Year	Album	Peak positions	Certifications
Year	Album	AUS	Certifications
1984	Your Average Australian Yobbo: Released: 1984; Label: Both Barrels Music, CBS (SBP 8174); Format: LP, cassette	20	
1985	Kev's Back (The Return of the Yobbo): Released: 1985; Label: Both Barrels Music, CBS (SBP 8215); Format: LP, cassette, CD (BBCD 100797R)	8	ARIA: 4× Platinum
1987	Born Again Piss Tank: Released: October 1987; Label: Both Barrels Music, CBS (460432 1); Format: LP, cassette	16	ARIA: 2× Platinum
1989	My Australian Roots: Released: May 1989; Label: Both Barrels Music, CBS (465428 1); Format: LP, cassette, CD	25	
1991	Let's Call Him ... Kev!: Released: November 1991; Label: Both Barrels Music, CBS (469188 2); Format: CD, cassette	50	
1993	Nashville Trash: Released: 1993; Label: Both Barrels Music (BB01); Format: CD	—	
1994	Backout from the Outback: Released: 1994; Label: Both Barrels Music (BB05); Format: CD	—	
1996	Santa's Kummin': Kev's Kristmas Album: Released: November 1996; Label: Both Barrels Music (BBCD 60896); Format: CD	—	
1998	Kalgoorlie Love Songs: Released: November 1998; Label: Both Barrels Music (BBCD 160798); Format: CD	—	
2001	The Second Kummin' of Kev: Released: 2001; Label: Both Barrels Music (BBCD 08); Format: CD	—	
2006	DILLIGAF: Released: 2006; Label: Both Barrels Music, Sony Music Australia (BBCD 011006); Format: CD	—	
2009	Excess All Areas: Released: September 2009; Label: Both Barrels Music, Sony Music Australia; Format: CD	—	
2013	Wrong! Wrong! Wrong!: Released: September 2013; Label: Both Barrels Music (BBCD011113); Format: CD, Digital download	—	
2016	Rides Again: Released: 14 October 2016; Label: Both Barrels Music (BBCD010916); Format: CD, Digital download	—	
2018	Kev's Krissmas Vol 2: Released: August 2018; Label: Kevin Bloody Wilson; Format: CD, Digital download	—	
2023	International DILLIGAF Day: Released: April 2023; Label: Kevin Bloody Wilson; Format: CD, Digital download	—	

=== Live albums ===
Year	Album	Peak positions
Year	Album	AUS
1995	Let Loose Live in London: Released: 1995; Label: Both Barrels Music (BBCD2894); Format: CD	—
2003	Let Loose Live in the Outback: Released: 2003; Label: Both Barrels Music (BBCD10); Format: CD	—
2007	Let Loose Back Home: Released: 2007; Label: Both Barrels Music (BBDVD011107); Format: CD/DVD, download	95

=== Compilation albums ===
Year	Album	Peak positions	Certifications
Year	Album	AUS	Certifications
1990	The Loveable Larrikin: Released: 1990; Label: X Rated, Both Barrels Music; Format: LP, CD	—	
1990	Far-Canal: Released: 1990; Label: Both Barrels Music; Format: LP, CD	—	
1992	The Worst of Kevin Bloody Wilson: Released: 1992; Label: Sony Music (472317 2); Format: CD	—	ARIA: Gold
2004	20 Years Of Kev: Released: August 2004; Label: Both Barrels Music (BBCD 160704); Format: CD	64	ARIA: Gold
2011	Klassic Kev: Released: December 2011; Label: Kevin Bloody Wilson; Format: CD, Digital Download	—	
2019	35 Years of Kevin Bloody Wilson: Released: 26 July 2019; Label: Sony Music Australia (19075979242); Format: Digital Download, CD, streaming	—	

His songs generally consist of irreverent humour and plenty of swearing with eclectic musical backing.

== ARIA Awards ==
He has been nominated five times for the ARIA Award for Best Comedy Release at the ARIA Music Awards:

Year	Nominee / work	Award	Result
1987	Kev's Back	Best Comedy Release	Won
1987	Kev's Back	Highest Selling Album	Nominated
1990	My Australian Roots	Best Comedy Release	Nominated
1992	Let's Call Him Kev	Best Comedy Release	Nominated
1995	Let Loose Live in London	Best Comedy Release	Nominated
2002	The Second Kummin' of Kev	Best Comedy Release	Nominated

== Website ==
Wilson was the first Australian performing artist to have a website which a friend set up for him in 1993, which has since been a major source of album and product sales. He also runs an internet radio station kevfm.com, which was the first 24-hour adult comedy radio station.

== Daughter ==
Tammy Jo "Jenny Talia" Bryant has followed in her father's footsteps singing similarly bawdy songs, some of them being reworded Kev songs, but done from a female perspective.
