= Big Pig (EP) =

1988 EP by indie pop band Big Pig

EP by Big Pig
- Released: May 1986
- Recorded: Richmond Recorders
- Label: Big Pig
- Producer: Big Pig, Etienne Conod

Big Pig chronology
Big Pig (1986)	Bonk (1988)

Big Pig is the debut self-titled extended play (EP) by Australian indie pop band Big Pig, released independently in May 1986.

The EP was re-released following the band's signing to Mushroom's White Label Records.

At the ARIA Music Awards of 1987, the EP won the ARIA Award for Best Cover Art.

== Track listing ==
Original release

Side One
No.	Title	Writer(s)	Length
1.	"Hungry Town"	Big Pig, Oleh Witer	2:51
2.	"Devil's Song"	Big Pig, Witer	4:18

Side Two
No.	Title	Writer(s)	Length
1.	"Money God"	Big Pig, Witer	3:59

White Label re-release

Side Three
No.	Title	Writer(s)	Length
1.	"Hungry Town" (Extended Dance Mix)	Big Pig, Witer	6:42

Side Four
No.	Title	Writer(s)	Length
1.	"Money God" (Extended Dance Mix)	Big Pig, Witer	6:24

== Release history ==
Region	Date	Format(s)	Label	Catalogue
Australia	May 1986	12" EP	Big Pig Music	BP 001
Australia / New Zealand	1986	2x 12" EP / Cassette	White Label Records	C 14444, L14444
