= Ups and Downs (band) =

Australian pop band

- Also known as: Ups & Downs
- Years active: 1983 - 1990, 2007, 2008, 2011, 2017
- Members: Darren Atkinson; Greg Atkinson; John Flade; Trevor O'Neil; Peter Shaw; Alex Ronayne

Ups and Downs is an Australian pop band. Their single "The Living Kind" was nominated for the ARIA Award for Best New Talent at the ARIA Music Awards of 1987.

== History ==
=== 1983-1990 ===
Ups and Downs was formed in Brisbane in 1983 by brothers Greg and Darren Atkinson with John Flade. Peter Shaw soon joined the lineup. After the release of two singles through Basketcase in 1984, they relocated to Sydney, where they built a cult following.

In 1986 they released the single "The Living Kind" through True Tone which saw them nominated for an ARIA Award at the ARIA Music Awards of 1987.

In 1987 Trevor O'Neil joined the band. They signed with Mushroom Records and released their debut album Underneath the Watchful Eye in 1988. Flade left the band in 1989 and they released one more EP before breaking up in 1990.

=== 2007-present ===
In 2007 they played at Pig City, a celebration of Brisbane music, and for the 4ZZZ Flashback, a 40th anniversary of the Brisbane radio station.

They reformed in 2011 for a series of shows and they released a compilation album of old tracks, Out of the Darkness: Sleepless, Singles & Other Stories.

In 2017 they released their album "The Sky's In Love With You" on Basketcase Records, with bass player Alex Ronayne.

In September 2019, they recorded a cover version of The Hummingbirds' "Two Weeks With a Good Man in Niagara Falls" for the Shake Yer Popboomerang Volume 3 compilation. Before re-recording and releasing "The Real World", which was featured on the 1983 cassette Darling It's Wonderful.

== Band members ==
=== Members ===
- Darren Atkinson - drums, vocals
- Greg Atkinson - bass, vocals
- John Flade - guitar
- Trevor O'Neil - keyboards
- Peter Shaw - guitar
- Alex Ronayne - bass

== Discography ==
=== Studio albums ===
Title	Details	Peak chart positions
Title	Details	AUS
Sleepless	Released: August 1986; Label: Truetone Records (830269-1 / 830269-4); Format: LP, Cassette	84
Underneath the Watchful Eye	Released: November 1988; Label: Mushroom Records (D38951/ C38951); Format: CD, Cassette	75
The Sky's in Love With You	Released: 4 November 2017; Label: Basketcase; Format: Music download, streaming	-

=== Compilation albums ===
Title	Details
Anthology	Released: 2001; Label: Big Heavy Stuff Web Release; Format: CD; Note: Limited to 100 copies
Out of the Darkness (Sleepless, Singles & Other Stories)	Released: July 2011; Label: Feel Presents (FEEL 010); Format: CD, DD

=== Extended plays ===
Title	Details
Darling It's Wonderful	Released: 1983; Label: Ups And Downs; Format: Cassette
Rash	Released: 1990; Label: Volition (VOLT 31); Format: CD, 12" LP

=== Singles ===
Title	Year	Peak chart positions	Album
Title	Year	AUS	Album
"Darling It's Wonderful"	1983	—	Darling It's Wonderful
"Living Inside My Head"	1984	—	non album single
"Perfect Crime"	1985	—	non album single
"In the Shadows"	1986	—	non album single
"The Living Kind"	1986	75	Sleepless
"Lit by the Fuse"	1988	94	Underneath the Watchful Eye
"Moments Away"	1988	—	Underneath the Watchful Eye
"Untie Ian"	1991	—	non album single
"True Love Waste"	2017	—	The Sky's in Love with You
"Disco in My Head"	2018	—	The Sky's in Love with You
"Some Sleep"	2018	—	The Sky's in Love with You
"The Real World"	2019	—	non album single

== Awards and nominations ==
=== ARIA Music Awards ===
The ARIA Music Awards is an annual awards ceremony that recognises excellence, innovation, and achievement across all genres of Australian music. They commenced in 1987.

Year	Nominee / work	Award	Result
1987	themselves	Best New Talent	Nominated

=== Countdown Australian Music Awards ===
Countdown was an Australian pop music TV series on national broadcaster ABC-TV from 1974–1987, it presented music awards from 1979–1987, initially in conjunction with magazine TV Week. The TV Week / Countdown Awards were a combination of popular-voted and peer-voted awards.

Year	Nominee / work	Award	Result
1986	themselves	Most Promising New Talent	Nominated
