= It All Ends Up in Tears =

It All Ends Up In Tears

Studio album by Vince Jones
- Released: October 1987
- Studio: Metropolis Studios, Melbourne, Australia
- Genre: Jazz
- Length: 47:46
- Label: EMI Music
- Producer: Paul Grabowsky

Vince Jones chronology
Tell Me a Secret (1986)	It All Ends Up In Tears (1987)	Trustworthy Little Sweethearts (1989)

It All Ends Up In Tears is the sixth studio album by Australian jazz musician Vince Jones, released in October 1987.

At the ARIA Music Awards of 1988 it won the ARIA Award for Best Jazz Album.

== Track listing ==
1. "If You're Goin' to the City" (Mose Allison)
2. "Jettison" (Vince Jones)
3. "Five O'Clock in the Morning" (Joe Williams)
4. "Budgie" (Vince Jones)
5. "You Don't Know What Love Is" (Don Raye, Gene DePaul)
6. "Rainbow Cake" (Paul Grabowsky, Vince Jones)
7. "Comes Love" (Charles Tobias, Les Brown, Sam H. Stept)
8. "But Beautiful" (Jimmy Van Heusen, Johnny Burke)
9. "A Sweet Defeat" (Paul Grabowsky, Vince Jones)
10. "Circle in the Square" (Paul Grabowsky, Vince Jones)
11. "It All Ends Up in Tears" (Vince Jones)

== Charts ==
Chart (1987)	Position
Australia (Kent Music Report)	79
