= Your Average Australian Yobbo =

Studio album by Kevin Bloody Wilson
- Released: 1984
- Genre: Comedy/Australian humour
- Length: 34:20
- Labels: Both Barrels Music; CBS Records Australia
- Producer: Kevin Bloody Wilson

Kevin Bloody Wilson chronology
Your Average Australian Yobbo (1984)	Kev's Back (The Return of the Yobbo) (1985)

Your Average Australian Yobbo is the debut album by Australian singer/comedian Kevin Bloody Wilson. It started out as just a collection of rude songs on a tape which he sold at performances at pubs and clubs around Australia, and by mail order. 22,000 copies of the cassette, Your Average Australian Yobbo, were sold this way. The album was later transferred to vinyl in 1986 and then re-released on CD in April 2002.

== Track listing ==
All tracks written by Denis Bryant.

1. "Sunday Morning" - 3:42
2. "I Gave Up Wanking" - 4:01
3. "Cum Chin Mi Gurflen" - 1:39
4. "Arr Fuck" (The Instrumental) - 1:59
5. "Country Bumpkin" - 3:48
6. "That Fucking Cat's Back" - 2:55
7. "Stack the Fridge" - 2:31
8. "Ailments of the Eighties" - 2:16
9. "Wow, Did I Get Whacked!" - 5:48
10. "The Festival of Life" - 5:41

== Charts ==
Chart (1984–86)	Peak position
Australian (Kent Music Report)	8
