= 60 Summers =

Greatest hits album by Graeme Connors
- Released: 29 April 2016
- Length: 151:44
- Label: ABC Country

Graeme Connors chronology
Kindred Spirit (2013)	60 Summers (2016)	#1 Hits Live (2018)

60 Summers (subtitled The Ultimate Collection) is the third compilation album by Australian country music singer, Graeme Connors. It was released in April 2016 and peaked at number 11 on the ARIA charts, becoming Connors' highest-charting album.

The album was promoted with the single of the same name released in March 2016 and its video premiering on 20 April 2016.

== Track listing ==
CD1

1. "60 Summers" (Graeme Connors) - 3:44
2. "Seasonally Adjusted" (Connors) - 3:24
3. "Mosquitoville" (Connors) - 3:17
4. "Cyclone Season" (Connors) - 3:15
5. "Let the Canefields Burn" (Connors) - 5:06
6. "The Mouth of the River" (Connors) - 4:58
7. "The Great Australian Dream" (Connors) - 5:06
8. "It's All Good" (Connors, Mark McDuff) - 3:56 n
9. "The Oldest Kid in Town" (Connors) - 3:44
10. "The Simple Truth" (Connors, McDuff) - 4:40
11. "Whatever It Takes" (Connors, McDuff) - 4:04
12. "Before the Wet" (Connors) - 5:04
13. "Pacifica" (Connors) - 4:08
14. "Mt Everest" (Connors) - 3:17
15. "A Beach House in the Blue Mountains" (Connors) - 4:08
16. "Socrates" (Connors) - 3:41
17. "A Good Life" (Connors) 4:42
18. "Rock 'n' Roll Time" (Kris Kristofferson, Roger McGuinn, Bob Neuwirth) - 4:52
19. "The Love I Leave Behind" (Allan Caswell, Drew McAlister) - 3:57

CD2

1. "A Little Further North Each Year" (Connors) - 3:39
2. "Louisa" (Connors, McDuff) - 4:54
3. "You’re Getting to Me" (Connors, McDuff) - 3:57
4. "What If" (Connors) - 3:56
5. "Only One You" (Connors) - 4:10
6. "Go On" (Connors, Michael Carr) - 3:58
7. "Half an Hour to Happy Hour" (Connors, McDuff) - 3:16
8. "The Road Less Travelled" (Connors) - 4:30
9. "Big Jimmy and Felicidad" (Connors) - 3:16
10. "Watching Byron Raise the Flag" (Connors) - 3:55
11. "The Piper" (Connors) - 3:37
12. "Bondwood Boat" (Connors, Aleyce Simmonds) - 3:18
13. "I Notice These Things" (Connors) - 3:44
14. "Dieseline Dreams" (Connors) - 4:05
15. "Better Off Alone" (Connors, Gary Scruggs) - 3:46
16. "Prodigal Son" (Connors) - 4:22
17. "An Old Piece of Wood" (Connors) - 4:03
18. "The Ringer and the Princess" (Connors) - 6:15

== Charts ==
=== Weekly charts ===
Chart (2016)	Peak position
Australian Albums (ARIA)	11

=== Year-end charts ===
Chart (2016)	Position
ARIA Country Albums Chart	9
Chart (2017)	Position
ARIA Country Albums Chart	71
