= The Living Kind =

Single by Ups and Down

from the album Sleepless
- Released: August 1986
- Studio: Trafalgar Studios, Sydney
- Length: 3:49
- Label: Truetone Records
- Songwriter(s): Darren Atkinson, Greg Atkinson
- Producer(s): Alan Thorne, Ups and Downs

Ups and Down singles chronology
| "In the Shadows" (1986) | "The Living Kind" (1986) | "Lit by the Fuse" (1988) |

"The Living Kind" is a song by Australian pop group Ups and Down. The song was released in August 1986 as the lead single from their debut studio album Sleepless. The song peaked at number 75 on the Australian singles chart.

At the ARIA Music Awards of 1987 the song earned the band a nomination for Best New Talent.

== Track listing ==
7" (884915-7)

- Side A "The Living Kind"
- Side B "Painted Sad"

== Charts ==
| Chart (1986–1988) | Peak position |
|---|---|
| Australia (Kent Music Report) | 75 |
