= APRA Music Awards of 1986 =

Annual Australian music awards

- Date: 1986
- Website: apra-amcos.com.au

The Australasian Performing Right Association Awards of 1986 (generally known as APRA Awards) are a series of awards held in 1986. The APRA Music Awards were presented by Australasian Performing Right Association (APRA) and the Australasian Mechanical Copyright Owners Society (AMCOS).

== Awards ==
Only winners are noted

Award	Winner
Gold Award	"And the Band Played Waltzing Matilda" (Eric Bogle) by Eric Bogle, the Bushwackers
Most Performed Australasian Music for Film	Razorback (Iva Davies) by Iva Davies
Most Performed Australasian Country Work	"I'm Married to My Bulldog Mack" (Graeme Connors, Doug Trevor) by Graeme Connors
Most Performed Australasian Popular Work	"Soul Kind of Feeling" (Robert Susz) by Dynamic Hepnotics
Most Performed Australasian Serious Work	Trio for Flute, Clarinet & Bassoon (George Dreyfus)
Most Performed Australasian Jazz Work	"For All Colours" (Vince Jones) by Vince Jones
Most Performed Overseas Work	"I Just Called to Say I Love You" (Stevie Wonder) by Stevie Wonder

== See also ==
- Music of Australia
