= Tell Me a Secret =

Studio album by Vince Jones
- Released: November 1986
- Recorded: June–August 1986
- Studio: Flagstaff Studios & AAV, Studio Two
- Genre: Jazz
- Length: 47:46
- Label: EMI Music
- Producer: Vince Jones

Vince Jones chronology
On the Brink of It (1985)	Tell Me a Secret (1986)	It All Ends Up In Tears (1987)

Tell Me a Secret is the fifth studio album by Australian jazz musician Vince Jones, released in November 1986.

At the ARIA Music Awards of 1987, the album was nominated for Best Jazz Album and Best Adult Contemporary Album.

== Track listing ==
1. "Don't Worry About a Thing" - 3:12
2. "Two Sleepy People" - 2:56
3. "Sensual Item" - 4:19
4. "I've Been Used" - 2:39
5. "Too Much Too Soon" - 3:01
6. "Tell Me a Secret" - 3:59
7. "Stop This World" - 3:45
8. "It's Hard to Be Good" - 4:10
9. "Harold's Land" - 4:34
10. "I've Never Been in Love Before" - 3:20
11. "Some Say You Win" - 3:29
12. "All the Way" - 5:02

== Charts ==
Chart (1986)	Position
Australia (Kent Music Report)	71
