= Big Pig =

Australian funk/pop band

- Origin: Melbourne, Victoria, Australia
- Genres: Funk, rock, pop
- Years active: 1985–1991
- Labels: White Label/Mushroom, Festival, A&M
- Past members: Sherine Abeyratne; Tony Antoniades; Neil Baker; Nick Disbray; Tim Rosewarne; Adrian Scaglione; Oleh Witer

Big Pig was an Australian funk, rock and pop band that existed from 1985 to 1991. An early line-up was Sherine Abeyratne on lead vocals and percussion (ex-Editions, Bang); Tony Antoniades on vocals and harmonica; Neil Baker on drums; Nick Disbray on vocals and percussion; Tim Rosewarne on vocals and keyboards (ex-Bang); Adrian Scaglione on drums; and Oleh Witer on vocals and percussion (ex-Bang). They issued two albums, Bonk (May 1988) and You Lucky People (15 November 1990), on the White Label Records imprint of Mushroom Records.

Bonk reached No. 5 on the Kent Music Report. In New Zealand, it peaked at No. 2. On the Kent Music Report they had three top 50 singles with "Hungry Town" (October 1986) which peaked at No. 18, "Breakaway" (February 1988) at No. 8, and "Big Hotel" (July) at No. 40. In New Zealand, "Breakaway" was a number-one hit, while "Hungry Town" and "Big Hotel" both reached the top 30. At the ARIA Music Awards of 1987, Big Pig were nominated for Best New Talent and Best Video for "Hungry Town" by Julie Stone Productions, and they won Best Cover Artist for their debut self-titled extended play (May 1986) by Witer.

== History ==
=== 1984–1985: Formation ===
In 1984, Big Pig was formed in London by visiting Australian drummer, Oleh Witer (ex-Scratch Record Scratch, Bang), with a variable line-up of eight or nine drummers.

I'd been in four bands and nothing had really come of it. I put loads of effort into each group, and at the end we'd have nothing to show for it, except a lousy demo or something. And I thought, 'Well, right, if I'm gonna do it again, I'm gonna do it on my own terms completely. I'm going to write all the songs, I'm going to create something that's very different and I'm not going to compromise at all on my ideas.' And that's really what sparked it off.

— Witer

Inspired by a performance of Japanese taiko drummers, Witer formed Big Pig: "When I saw them, the key to it was orchestration – that each guy had his own part. There was no improvisation at all. So from that point on, I knew how to do it. It was just a matter of getting the right people". The initial incarnation involved eight or nine drummers with Witer trying to sing over the poly-rhythmic din, while members of the band came and went. At an early gig Witer's former bandmate, Sherine Abeyratne, attended and subsequently joined the ensemble. As a vocalist, she had been a member of various groups: Grand Wazoo, The Editions, Bang, Big Choir, Bob Starkie Shape Up, Gospel Truth, Jo Jo Zep Band, Black Coffee, Dianna Boss and The Extremes, and The Rock Party. In 1988, Sherine recalled "I started joining bands eight years ago, as long as the music was high-energy, really strong, that was the criterion". She had also toured with INXS as a backing vocalist. Another early member was Nick Disbray on vocals and percussion.

Witer and Sherine were previously together in a Melbourne-based band, Bang, which Australian musicologist, Ian McFarlane, described as playing "Grace Jones-styled funk". Witer wanted an edgier, more experimental sound that also retained Bang's funky rhythms and, when his visa ran out, he returned to Melbourne. Late in 1985, Big Pig consisted of Abeyratne on lead vocals and percussion, Tony Antoniades on vocals and harmonica, Neil Baker on drums, Disbray on vocals and percussion, Tim Rosewarne on vocals and keyboards (also ex-Scratch Record Scratch and then Bang with Witer), Adrian Scaglione on drums, and Witer on vocals and percussion. McFarlane felt the new group's sound used a "more avant-funk-meets-disco route while still retaining a feel for pop economy".

=== 1986: Big Pig ===
Big Pig made its concert debut in February 1986 and soon recorded a self-financed, independently distributed three-track, self-titled extended play, which was released in May. It was co-produced by Etienne Conod and Big Pig. Two of its tracks were "Hungry Town" and "Money God". They signed with Mushroom Records' imprint White Label Records, which re-released their debut EP in October as a double-12" with bonus dance mixes of "Hungry Town" and "Money God". In November that year, Polyanna Sutton of The Canberra Times reported that the group had postponed plans to return to London pending interest from the United States. Antoniades told her "The dance mixes are just for clubs, really. The other thing is: say it did well on the American club scene, it is a strong inroad into cracking some of the American market". Sutton noted that as they "do not use guitars there is a strong reliance on the harmonica to fulfill what the lead guitar would do, playing either riffs or solos".

"Hungry Town" peaked at No. 18 on the Australian Kent Music Report Singles Chart. In March the following year it reached No. 22 in New Zealand. Witer won an award for Best Cover Artist for the artwork on the Big Pig EP at the first ARIA Music Awards of 1987. They were also nominated for ARIA Award for Best New Talent and ARIA Award for Best Video for "Hungry Town" by Julie Stone Productions. The video was directed by Richard Lowenstein (INXS, Hunters & Collectors) and was filmed by Andrew de Groot at a Melbourne dance club.

=== 1987–1989: Bonk ===
Their debut studio album, Bonk, was recorded at Metropolis Studios in Melbourne, Rhinoceros Studios in Sydney and Townhouse Studios in London, in 1987, with producer Nick Launay (Public Image Ltd, Midnight Oil, Models). Bonk was mixed in London later that year and issued in May 1988.

It took about 3½ months to do, and we used three tracks, "Hungry Town", "Money God" and "Devil's Song", as the basis for the album after we'd reworked them. All the tracks were first recorded in Australia, and then we mixed the album in London. The biggest problem in recording was successfully integrating all the percussion parts so that nothing got lost in the mix. It would be possible to play all the songs live in the studio, like a gig, but the problems of miking make it very difficult, so we built up each track bit by bit by first programming a drum machine, and then replacing those parts with live drums. And by using the drum machine feel as a foundation, it becomes much easier to record complex patterns, and once you get past the high hat, kick drum and snare, it all becomes a lot more fluid and a lot more human. We always fought against the idea of sounding too robotic just because so much of Big Pig's sound is based on rhythms.

— Witer

Bonk reached No. 5 on the Australian Kent Music Report Albums Chart It went platinum in Australia. Due to their dominant use of drums, harmonica and vocals, along with the absence of guitars, the band established a unique place in Australian music. Sounding unlike contemporary groups, they also adopted their signature look wearing black waterproof aprons, similar to those worn by blacksmiths, which gave their stage presence a distinctly industrial feel. The group toured the US in May where Justin Mitchell for The Spokesman-Review noted that "Although five of the members sing, vocalist Sherine (no last name) and harp player [Antoniades] handle most of the front work".

The album provided three singles, the Chuck Jackson cover "Breakaway" which reached No. 8 (February 1988), "Big Hotel" (June) No. 40, and "Iron Lung" (December). In the US, Bonk was released by A&M Records in March 1988 and peaked at No. 93 on the Billboard 200 with "Breakaway" reaching No. 60 on the Billboard Hot 100 Singles Chart, and No. 7 on the related Dance Music/Club Play Singles chart. "Money God" was used as the theme for the BBC-TV's DEF II's Rough Guides show with Magenta Devine hosting, whilst tracks from Bonk were used for Miami Vice episodes in the late 1980s. "Hungry Town" and "Boy Wonder" both featured in the 1988 Yahoo Serious film, Young Einstein. "Breakaway" was used in the opening sequence of comedy-road film, Bill & Ted's Excellent Adventure (1989).

=== 1990–1991: You Lucky People ===
Big Pig's second album, You Lucky People, was produced by Hawk Wolinski and Daddy-O, and released on 15 November 1990. Witer told Shane Walker of The Canberra Times that "At the end of our Bonk episode we took time out to rest before spending a lot of time on writing ... this album has been more of a band effort, with everyone chipping in ... we're still searching for and evolving the possibilities there are in our instrumentation". Walker felt the album was "more subtle and rounded" showcasing their "blend of thumping bass, strong vocals, blues harmonica and, of course multitudinous drummers".

Fellow journalist Penelope Layland opined that You Lucky People showed a "simple, funky rhythm threading its way through the tracks, but a sprinkle of other sounds have found their way into the picture, a smattering of harmonica and a deft, sparing dose of keyboards". They toured in support of the album, then in February 1991, Big Pig played for the last time at Melbourne's Sidney Myer Music Bowl. They issued a single, "King of Nothing", on 18 March 1991 and disbanded soon after.

=== 1991–present: Afterwards ===
Disbray played some gigs with Caitlin Reilly in 1991 and by 1994 had released his debut solo album, Yep!.

Late in 1994, Tim Rosewarne joined Chocolate Starfish but these days plays keyboards in the Absolutely 80's show which features Scott Carne, Sean Kelly, David Sterry, Brian Mannix, Ally Fowler, Tottie Goldsmith, Dale Ryder, and others performing their hits. Witer is a visual artist whose paintings have been exhibited in galleries across Australia. He also composed music for the 1996 Australian film, Love and Other Catastrophes.

Mushroom Records re-released "Hungry Town" in June 1998 to celebrate the label's 25th anniversary.

In 2007, "Breakaway" was covered by US House Diva Inaya Day.

"Hungry Town" featured in the first episode of Channel 9's, Underbelly: The Golden Mile on 12 April 2010.

== Members ==
=== Former members ===
- Sherine Abeyratne — lead vocals, percussion
- Tony Antoniades — vocals, harmonica
- Neil Baker — drums
- Nick Disbray — vocals, percussion
- Tim Rosewarne — vocals, keyboards
- Adrian Scaglione — drums
- Oleh Witer — vocals, drums, percussion

=== Touring/session members ===
- Jim Benning – guitar
- Al Colman – bass
- Mike Tyler – guitar, bass, backing vocals

=== Other associations ===
- Rosewarne: Scratch Record Scratch, Red=Blue=Yellow, Bang, Big Choir, Flares, Crawling Kingsnakes, Chocolate Starfish, 21/20, Absolutely '80s
- Abeyratne: Grand Wazoo Band of 1000 Dances, The Editions, Bang, Big Choir, Bob Starkie Shape Up, Gospel Truth, Jo Jo Zep Band, Black Coffee, Dianna Boss and The Extremes, The Rock Party, Mercy Mercy, Sherine, Sherine's X Machine
- Witer: Scratch Record Scratch, Bang
- Baker: Crawling Kingsnakes, Convenience Store

== Discography ==
=== Studio albums ===
Title	Details	Peak chart positions			Certification
Title	Details	AUS	NZ	US	Certification
Bonk	Released: May 1988; Label: White Label Records (RML.53271); Format: LP, CD, Cassette	5	2	93	ARIA: Platinum
You Lucky People	Released: 15 November 1990; Label: White Label Records (D30251); Format: LP, CD, Cassette	104	—	—	

=== Extended plays ===
Title	Details
Big Pig	Released: May 1986; Label: Big Pig Music (BP 001); Format: CD, Cassette

=== Singles ===
Title	Year	Peak chart positions				Album
Title	Year	AUS	NZ	UK	US	Album
"Hungry Town"	1986	18	22	91	—	Big Pig
"Boy Wonder"	1987	59	—	—	—	Bonk
"Breakaway"	1988	8	1	89	60	Bonk
"Big Hotel"	1988	40	27	—	—	Bonk
"Iron Lung"	1988	—	—	—	—	Bonk
"Justifier + Taste"	1990	73	—	—	—	You Lucky People
"Hanging Tree"	1991	174	—	—	—	You Lucky People
"King of Nothing"	1991	—	—	—	—	You Lucky People

=== Soundtrack appearances ===
Title	Release	Soundtrack
"Hungry Town"	1988	Young Einstein
"Boy Wonder"	1988	Young Einstein
"Breakaway"	1989	Bill & Ted's Excellent Adventure

== Awards ==
=== ARIA Music Awards ===
The ARIA Music Awards is an annual awards ceremony that recognises excellence, innovation, and achievement across all genres of Australian music. It commenced in 1987, Big Pig have won one award from five nominations.

Year	Nominee / work	Award	Result
1987	"Hungry Town"	Best New Talent	Nominated
1987	"Hungry Town"	Best Video	Nominated
1987	Big Pig	Best Cover Art	Won
1989	Bonk	Album of the Year	Nominated
1989	"Big Hotel"	Best Video	Nominated

=== Countdown Australian Music Awards ===
Countdown was an Australian pop music TV series on national broadcaster ABC-TV from 1974 to 1987. It presented music awards from 1979 to 1987, initially in conjunction with magazine TV Week. The TV Week / Countdown Awards were a combination of popular-voted and peer-voted awards.

Year	Nominee / work	Award	Result
1986	"Hungry Town"	Best Debut Single	Nominated
1986	themselves	Best Debut Act	Nominated
1986	themselves	Most Promising New Talent	Won
