= Excess All Areas (Kevin Bloody Wilson album) =

Studio album by Kevin Bloody Wilson
- Released: 1 September 2009
- Genre: Comedy/Australian humour
- Length: 36:03
- Producer: Kevin Bloody Wilson

Kevin Bloody Wilson chronology
DILLIGAF (2006)	Excess All Areas (2009)	Klassic Kev (2011)

Excess All Areas is a 2009 album by Australian singer/comedian Kevin Bloody Wilson. The title is a pun on "Access All Areas" (text often found on backstage passes at concerts) being a homonym with the title in Australian English.

== Track listing ==
All tracks written by Denis Bryant.

1. "Nigel & Wilma" – 3:00
2. "Old Home Videos" – 3:37
3. "Bring Back The Biff" – 3:09
4. "Butter Face" – 2:41
5. "You Can't Call Me Kev Anymore" – 3:23
6. "Nanna Never Farted" – 2:57
7. "The Cougar Song" – 3:11
8. "Common Sense" – 3:37
9. "Me Beers Cut Off" – 3:29
10. "Readin Me My Wrongs" – 3:32
