= APRA Music Awards of 1987 =

Annual Australian music awards

- Date: 1987
- Website: apra-amcos.com.au

The Australasian Performing Right Association Awards of 1987 (generally known as APRA Awards) are a series of awards held in 1987. The APRA Music Awards were presented by Australasian Performing Right Association (APRA) and the Australasian Mechanical Copyright Owners Society (AMCOS).

== Awards ==
Only winners are noted

Award	Winner
Gold Award	"Back in Black" (Angus Young, Malcolm Young, Brian Johnson) by AC/DC
Gold Award	For works on the album, Brothers in Arms (Mark Knopfler) by Dire Straits
Most Performed Australasian Music for Film	Crocodile Dundee (Peter Best) by Peter Best
Most Performed Australasian Country Work	"The Garden" (Allan Caswell) by Allan Caswell
Most Performed Australasian Popular Work	"Live It Up" (Andrew "Greedy" Smith) by Mental As Anything
Most Performed Australasian Serious Work	The Mountain (Brenton Broadstock)
Most Performed Australasian Jazz Work	"Blue" (Vince Jones) by Vince Jones
Most Performed Overseas Work	"Chain Reaction" (Barry, Robin & Maurice Gibb) by Diana Ross

== See also ==
- Music of Australia
