= John Minson =

John Minson AM
- Born: John Edgar Minson; 6 June 1927; Sydney Australia
- Died: 10 March 2017 (aged 89); Coffs Harbour Australia
- Occupation: Radio Personality
- Years active: 1961–1987
- Spouse: Ann
- Children: Lawrie, Kate, James
- Awards: Member of the Order of Australia AM
- Website: John Minson

John Minson AM (6 June 1927 – 10 March 2017) was an Australian radio personality, who moved to Tamworth in 1961 to work as an announcer/copywriter at 2TM and briefly at sister station 2MO in Gunnedah.

== Career ==
The country music radio program that Minson hosted was one of a number born out of the need for changes designed to meet the challenge of television which commenced in Tamworth on 10 April 1965 and took away most of the station's night-time (then prime time) advertising revenue. The legend of "Mr Hoedown" was born in 1967 when Minson changed the name of his Radio 2TM country music program to "Hoedown". The show was discovered by listeners in far distant locations – as far as Tasmania and New Zealand in the South, most of Queensland, parts of South Australia, even the islands of New Guinea. Request mail came in, and a strong demand for more time. By the late 1960s, Hoedown was so popular it was running from 7.30 to 11 and 2TM became the first station to be playing country music every weeknight. It was also becoming apparent that country music offered big possibilities for 2TM and Tamworth. In 1969, Minson was part of a group at the radio station that launched the concept of Tamworth as the Country Music Capital of Australia.

== Awards ==
In 1998, Minson was awarded an AM (Member of the Order of Australia) for service to country music and the entertainment industry and in particular for his contribution in establishing Tamworth as Australia's Country Music Capital.

=== Australian Roll of Renown ===
The Australian Roll of Renown honours Australian and New Zealander musicians who have shaped the music industry by making a significant and lasting contribution to country music.

Year	Nominee / work	Award	Result
1988	Australian Roll of Renown	inductee	
1994	Hands of Fame	imprinted	

=== South Australian Country Music Festival Awards ===
Year	Nominee / work	Award	Result
1992	South Australian Country Music Festival Awards	inductee	

=== Tamworth Songwriters Awards ===
The Tamworth Songwriters Association (TSA) is an annual songwriting contest for original country songs, awarded in January at the Tamworth Country Music Festival.

Year	Nominee / work	Award	Result (wins only)
1995	Tex Morton Award	awarded	
