= Lawrie Minson =

Australian musician

- Birth name: Lawrence Minson
- Born: 13 September 1958 (age 66); Paddington, NSW Australia
- Genres: Country / Rockabilly
- Occupation(s): Musician, Songwriter
- Instrument(s): Accordion, banjo, didgeridoo, guitar, harmonica, harp, mandolin, piano, vocals
- Years active: 1979–present

Lawrence (Lawrie) Minson (born 13 September 1958) is an Australian country musician, best known as a session player.

== Career ==
Minson is the son of former Australian radio personality John Minson. His country music career commenced in 1979 accompanying Buddy Williams on tour as a guitarist. He went on to performing with Slim Dusty in 1981 and 1982. Since then, Minson has performed as part of the Lee Kernaghan touring band and accompanied various other Australian acts. In 1989, Minson contributed "When the Rain Tumbles Down in July" and "Murrumbidgee Jack", as a tribute to Tex Morton, on an instrumental record album of Australian classics. He married Shelley Watts in 2008. Together, they have performed as a rockabilly duo. In 2012, Minson's debut as a headline act was at an Australian Italian club in Launceston, Tasmania.

In 2016, Tamworth Songwriters' Association presented Minson with the Tex Morton Award for his support and promotion of new songwriters.

== Discography ==
=== Albums ===
List of Albums
Title	Details
Memories Of Home - An Instrumental Tribute to Our Travelling Country Music Showmen	Released: 1989; Label: EMI (EMX 781815)
Family Tree	Released: 1996; Label: ABC Music (724348984029)
Milestones: The Ultimate Collection	Released: 2011; Note: Compilation album

=== Charting singles ===
List of singles as featured artist, with selected chart positions
Title	Year	Peak chart positions
Title	Year	AUS
"The Garden" (as Australia Too)	1985	22

== Awards ==
=== CMAA Awards ===
These annual awards have been presented since 1973 and have been organised by Country Music Association of Australia (CMAA) from 1993, to "encourage, promote and recognise excellence in Australian country music recording". From that time, the recipient's trophy has been a Golden Guitar.

Year	Nominee / work	Award	Result (wins only)
1990	"Wild River"	Instrumental of the Year	Won
1997	"Action Jackson"	Instrumental of the Year	Won

=== Tamworth Songwriters Awards ===
The Tamworth Songwriters Association (TSA) is an annual songwriting contest for original country songs, awarded in January at the Tamworth Country Music Festival. They commenced in 1986.

Year	Nominee / work	Award	Result (wins only)
2016	Lawrie Minson	Tex Morton Award	awarded
