= It's a Long Way There (Greatest Hits) =

Greatest hits album by Little River Band
- Released: September 1978
- Recorded: 1975–1978
- Genre: Pop rock
- Label: EMI
- Producer: Beeb Birtles; Graeham Goble; Glenn Wheatley; Little River Band; John Boylan

Little River Band chronology
Sleeper Catcher (1978)	It's a Long Way There (Greatest Hits) (1978)	First Under the Wire (1979)

It's a Long Way There (Greatest Hits) is the first compilation album by the Australian group Little River Band, released in Australia and New Zealand in September 1978. The album peaked at No. 4 on the Australian Kent Music Report albums chart and No. 12 in New Zealand. The album sold over 200,000 copies in Australia. Retitled It's a Long Way There (1975–1979) it was re-issued in Germany for the European market in 1979.

== Background ==
The eleven tracks on the compilation album, It's a Long Way There (Greatest Hits), are presented in chronological order of the singles' release dates, which are taken from the band's first four Australian studio albums. It was released in Australia and New Zealand via EMI Music in September 1978. Pop rock group Little River Band were formed in March 1975 in Melbourne. In May they signed with EMI Records and started recording their debut album, Little River Band (October) with the line-up of Beeb Birtles on lead vocals, backing vocals, guitars (acoustic, electric), Ric Formosa on guitars (lead, acoustic, slide), Graeham Goble on lead vocals, backing vocals and guitars (acoustic, electric), Roger McLachlan on bass guitar, Derek Pellicci on drums and percussion and Glenn Shorrock on lead vocals, backing vocals, percussion and harmonica. Three of its singles appeared on Australia's Kent Music Report singles chart. Their second album, After Hours (1976) provided one track, "Everyday of My Life". During August 1976 both Formosa and McLachlan were replaced by David Briggs on guitar and George McArdle on bass guitar, respectively. Their third Australian album, Diamantina Cocktail (1977), delivered four tracks and fourth album, ''Sleeper Catcher (1978) has three on this greatest hits album. The compilation reached No. 4 on the Kent Music Report albums chart – the highest charting compilation by Little River Band in Australia. Retitled It's a Long Way There (1975–1979) it was re-issued in Germany for the European market.

== Track listing ==
Side A
No.	Title	Writer(s)	Original album	Length
1.	"Curiosity (Killed the Cat)"	Beeb Birtles (as Gerard Bertelkamp)	Little River Band (1975)	3:40
2.	"Emma"	Glenn Shorrock	Little River Band (1975)	3:35
3.	"Everyday of My Life"	Birtles	After Hours (1976)	3:51
4.	"It's a Long Way There"	Graeham Goble	Little River Band (1975)	8:39
5.	"Help Is on Its Way"	Shorrock	Diamantina Cocktail (1977)	4:04

Side B
No.	Title	Writer(s)	Original album	Length
1.	"Witchery"	Birtles, Goble	Diamantina Cocktail (1977)	2:45
2.	"Happy Anniversary"	Birtles, David Briggs	Diamantina Cocktail (1977)	4:03
3.	"Home on Monday"	Birtles, Shorrock	Diamantina Cocktail (1977)	3:53
4.	"Shut Down Turn Off"	Shorrock	Sleeper Catcher (1978)	3:55
5.	"Reminiscing"	Goble	Sleeper Catcher (1978)	4:11
6.	"Lady"	Goble	Sleeper Catcher (1978)	4:55

== Charts ==
Chart performance for It's a Long Way There (Greatest Hits)
Chart (1978–1979)	Peak position
Australian Albums (Kent Music Report)	4
New Zealand Albums (RMNZ)	12

== Sales ==
Sales for It's a Long Way There (Greatest Hits)
Region	Certification	Certified units/sales
Australia	—	200,000
