= Stealin' Home (Ian Matthews album) =

Studio album by Ian Matthews
- Released: 11 August 1978
- Recorded: 1978
- Studio: Chipping Norton
- Genre: Soft rock
- Length: 36:51
- Label: Rockburgh (UK) Mushroom (US and Canada)
- Producer: Sandy Roberton, Ian Matthews

Ian Matthews chronology
Hit and Run (1977)	Stealin' Home (1978)	Siamese Friends (1979)

Singles from Stealin' Home
- 1. "Shake It" B-side "Stealin' Home " Released: September 1978 (US); 2. "Give Me an Inch" B-side "Let There Be Blues " Released: February 1979 (US); 3. "Don't Hang Up Your Dancing Shoes" B-side "Slip Away " Released: May 1979 (US)

Stealin' Home is the ninth solo album by British singer/songwriter Ian Matthews. The album is the first of Matthews' four solo albums released by Rockburgh Records. Matthews produced the album with the label's founder, Sandy Roberton, who previously produced In Search of Amelia Earhart (1972) for Matthews' band Plainsong, and later served as a producer for Matthews' solo albums Siamese Friends (1979), Spot Of Interference (1983), and Shook (1984).

Originally released on vinyl by Rockburgh Records on 11 August 1978 (catalogue # ROC 106), and in the US and Canada by Mushroom Records in September of that year (MRS 5012), Stealin' Home has been released over 40 times on vinyl, cassette, 8-track cartridge and CD, more than any other album in Matthews’ 50 plus years as a recording artist.

Expanded versions of the album featuring a 9-song live performance recorded at Texas A&M University in November 1978 were released by Air Mail Archive in Japan in 2013 (AIRAC-1701) and US label Omnivore in 2014 (OVCD-98).

== Background ==
"Loner Musician Plots Harmonious Career"
(15 November 1978) (excerpt)
"When his [Elektra Records] contract expired [Matthews] moved to Columbia Records. When [that] contract...expired, 'no one said anything' [recalls Matthews] so [he] made 'some demos & kind of did the round of the record companies...[Then] right out of the blue a friend [called] from London[: Sandy Robertson,] owner of Rock- burgh Records, who] was the only [music exec] who [approached] me at that...time. I went over there & signed a record deal & we recorded the album. [Robertson] started approaching [North American labels] with a complete album.'"

Recorded in the early summer of 1978 at Chipping Norton Recording Studios in the West Oxfordshire town of Chipping Norton, Stealin' Home was the result of Ian Matthews' first UK recording sessions since 1973 but in the opinion of Mark Deming of AMG, Matthews on Stealin' Home "dove headfirst into a polished pop sound that made the one-time British folkie sound like a member of the LA Mellow Mafia. [Though] recorded in Oxfordshire, 'Stealin' Home' re-created the meticulously crafted sound of West Coast pop with impressive accuracy."

Alan Mckay of MusicRiot.co.uk concurs that "with great session players, tasteful (bordering on minimal) FM radio-friendly arrangements and lyrics dealing with American themes [plus] a singer with a plaintive high tenor voice" it's obvious that "the album was aimed squarely at the American market". McKay further opines: "The theme running through the album was the failure of the American dream...Matthews picked out songs about the party set, car fanatics and sports groupies to form the backbone of this album. It's a melancholy album because it looks back at the unfulfilled promise of American lives in the same way that Bob Seger did with songs like 'Hollywood Nights" and 'Night Moves' and Jackson Browne did with 'The Pretender'."

While the lead US single off Stealin' Home: "Shake It", was in the Top 40, Matthews would tell Rolling Stone: "I don’t think I did anything different [to record a hit single]. I guess it's my reward. After all, I've been doing exactly what I want for 14 or 15 years." However Matthews would later acknowledge that on Stealin' Home, "I tried to add just a couple of songs that had Top 40 potential, without compromising the rest of the material [and the album] did precisely what it was supposed to do: it raised my profile, without lowering my credibility." Matthews had heard the original version of "Shake It" from its composer Terence Boylan's self-titled album played on a Seattle FM radio station: after Matthews phoned the radio station for info on the track the disc jockey sent him a copy of the 1977 Terence Boylan album from which Matthews would select two songs: "Shake It" and "Don't Hang Up Your Dancing Shoes", to record for Stealin' Home. "Don't Hang Up Your Dancing Shoes" would be the third single from the US release of Stealin' Home, the immediate followup to "Shake It" being the Robert Palmer composition "Give Me an Inch": having heard the original version of "Give Me an Inch" - introduced on the 1975 Robert Palmer album Pressure Drop - Matthews had wanted to put his own spin on the song.

Ian Matthews on Stealin' Home 36 years on
"I think it's a good album, from another time & place. A stepping stone of sorts. It turned me & propelled me in a certain direction, which...was exactly where I [then] needed to go. I don't listen to it much these days, but...whenever I do, I'm pleasantly surprised by its musicality.

Co-produced by Matthews with Sandy Roberton, who had produced Matthews' 1972 Plainsong project, Stealin' Home had its UK release on Roberton's Rockburgh Records label as ROC 106 and was picked up for September 1978 release in the US and Canada by Mushroom Records as MRS-5012. Matthews would give credit to Mushroom for the success of the album's lead single "Shake It", which afforded Matthews his first solo Top 40 hit: (Ian Matthews quote:)"I've had potential hit singles on [earlier] albums... but there's never been the enthusiasm I've had from this record company. It [gave] me a hit single." Spearheaded by the success of "Shake It", Stealin' Home became Matthews' first album to rise above the lower end of the Billboard 200 album chart where it reached a No. 80 peak in February concurrent with the No. 13 Billboard Hot 100 peak of the "Shake It" single, which would remain Matthews' only Top 40 hit, the second single from the Stealin' Home album: "Give Me an Inch", peaking at No. 67 and proving Matthews final Hot 100 entry. (Matthews, who had reached No. 23 on the Hot 100 in 1972 fronting the Matthews' Southern Comfort single "Woodstock", had as a solo act had one prior Hot 100 entry with "Da Doo Ron Ron" also in 1972.) Matthews would be afforded his final appearance on a Billboard chart via the third single off Stealin' Home: "Don't Hang Up Your Dancing Shoes", which peaked at No. 42 on the magazine's Easy Listening hit ranking, on which "Shake It" had reached No. 21 and "Give Me an Inch " No. 43.

In the UK the album's lead single was the John Martyn composition "Man in the Station" which Matthews would in 2014 cite as one of his two favorite tracks off the album (the other being his own "Let There Be Blues"), with successive single release then afforded the tracks "King of the Night" and "Give Me an Inch" before "Shake It" was issued as a UK single in February 1979, the last-named then nearing its No. 13 US chart peak: none of these singles garnered interest in the UK where the parent Stealin' Home album was resultantly also overlooked.

== Track listing (original 1978 album) ==
1. "Gimme an Inch Girl" (Robert Palmer) - 4:19
2. "Don't Hang Up Your Dancing Shoes" (Terence Boylan) - 2:58
3. "King of the Night" (Jeffrey Comanor) - 3:55
4. "Man in the Station" (John Martyn) - 3:53
5. "Let There Be Blues" (Ian Matthews) - 3:59
6. "Carefully Taught" (Richard Rodgers, Oscar Hammerstein II; arranged by Ian Matthews) - 0:59
7. "Stealin' Home" (Ian Matthews) - 3:21
8. "Shake It" (Terence Boylan) - 3:20
9. "Yank and Mary (Smile)" (Richard Stekol, Charlie Chaplin, John Turner, Geoffrey Parsons) - 2:29
10. "Slip Away" (Ian Matthews, Bill Lamb) - 4:12
11. "Sail My Soul" (Bill Lamb, Ian Matthews) - 4:26

The lead track varies in name depending on the version release of the album. On the Rockburgh Records vinyl release it is listed as "Gimme an Inch Girl" whereas on the Mushroom Records vinyl release it is just "Gimme an Inch". Similarly the Line Records CD release lists it as "Gimme an Inch Girl" whereas the Omnivore expanded CD release lists it as just "Gimme an Inch". The original song is the lead track on Robert Palmer's 1975 album Pressure Drop and is listed on that album as "Give Me an Inch".

== Track listing (expanded reissue) ==
Expanded versions of the album featuring a 9-song live performance recorded at Texas A&M University in November 1978 ('The Homecoming Concert') were released by Air Mail Archive in Japan in 2013 (AIRAC-1701)

1. "Tigers Will Survive" (Ian Matthews) - 3:45
2. "Stealin' Home" (Ian Matthews) - 5:02
3. "Shake It" (Terence Boylan) - 3:57
4. "Just One Look" (Ian Matthews, Jay Lacy) - 3:28
5. "King of the Night" (Jeffrey Comanor) - 4:31
6. "Man in the Station" (John Martyn) - 5:38
7. "Don't Hang Up Your Dancing Shoes" (Terence Boylan) - 2:57
8. "Call the Tune" (Ian Matthews) - 6:24
9. "Payday" (Jesse Winchester) - 4:47

The penultimate track in the live set is incorrectly listed as "Call the Tunes" on the 2014 Omnivore expanded release artwork. It is a song from Plainsong's In Search of Amelia Earhart album and should be "Call the Tune".

== Charts ==
Chart (1978)	Peak position
Australia (Kent Music Report)	81

== Personnel (original 1978 album) ==
- Ian Matthews - vocals
- Bryn Haworth - electric and acoustic guitars, mandolin
- Phil Palmer - electric guitar
- Jim Russell - drums
- Rick Kemp - bass
- Pete Wingfield - keyboards
- Mel Collins - saxophone on "Shake It" and "Let There Be Blues"
- Duffy Power - blues harp on "Man in the Station"
- Simon Morton - percussion

Production

- Produced by Sandy Roberton and Ian Matthews.
- Recording Engineer: Barry Hammond at Chipping Norton Studios.
- Front cover photo by Steve Hiett, courtesy of Reckitt & Colman.

Live concert band

- Ian Matthews - vocals, guitar
- Joel Tepp - guitar, harmonica
- Bob Metzger - guitar
- Mark Griffiths - bass, vocals
- Mick Weaver - keyboards
- Jim Russell - drums
