= Siamese Friends =

Studio album by Ian Matthews
- Released: 14 September 1979
- Recorded: 1979
- Label: UK Rockburgh Records US Mushroom Records
- Producer: Sandy Roberton

Ian Matthews chronology
Stealin' Home (1978)	Siamese Friends (1979)	Discreet Repeat (1979)

Siamese Friends is a solo album by singer/songwriter Ian Matthews. His tenth release, the album was recorded at Chipping Norton Recording Studios in Oxfordshire, with some overdubs added at Maison Rouge in Fulham.

The original vinyl album was released in 1979 on the Rockburgh Records label in the UK (ROC 107), various labels across Europe, and on Mushroom Records (MRS-5014) in the US and Canada. Siamese Friends was reissued on CD by Line Records in Germany in 1987 and a remastered version was issued by BGO records in 2005 as a 2-on-1 remaster coupled with Stealin' Home.

== Track listing ==
1. "You Don't See Me" (Ian Matthews/Mark Griffiths/Bob Metzger) - 4:04
2. "Survival" (Marc Jordan) - 3:23
3. "Heatwave" (Ian Matthews/Mark Griffiths) - 4:22
4. "Home Somewhere" (Jules Shear) - 3:36
5. "Crying In The Night" (Stevie Nicks) - 3:34
6. "The Baby She's On The Street" (Jona Lewie) - 3:37
7. "Hearts On The Line" (Ian Matthews/Judith Caldwell/Mark Griffiths) - 4:14
8. "Anna" (John Martyn) - 3:27
9. "Lies" (Ian Matthews/Mark Griffiths) - 3:33
10. "Runaway" (Ian Matthews) - 3:34

== Personnel ==
- Ian Matthews - Vocals, acoustic guitar
- Mark Griffiths - 4-string and fretless bass, electric guitar, backing vocals
- Bob Metzger - Electric and acoustic guitars
- Jim Russell - Drums
- Mick Weaver - Acoustic grand piano, clavinet, Fender Rhodes, Wurlitzer and Yamaha CS80
- Craig Buhler - Tenor and alto saxophones
- Wynder K Frogg - Hammond organ
- Mel Collins - Soprano and alto saxophones on "Anna", "Home Somewhere" and "Survival"
- Joel Tepp - Slide guitar on "The Baby She's On The Street" and "Anna"
- Simon Morton - Percussion

== Production ==
- Produced by Sandy Roberton
- Recording: Chipping Norton Studios; recording engineer Barry Hammond
- Overdubs: Maison Rouge, Fulham; recording engineer Tony Taverner
- Front and back cover photos: Brian D McLaughlin
- Inside photos: Keith Morris
- Album design: Chris Moore
- Album title: Jeffrey Comanor
