= Another Side of Rick =

Studio album by Rick Nelson
- Released: November 13, 1967
- Genre: Psychedelic pop
- Length: 30:10
- Label: Decca
- Producer: John Boylan

Rick Nelson chronology
Country Fever (1967)	Another Side of Rick (1967)	Perspective (1969)

Singles from Another Side of Rick
- 1. "Suzanne on a Sunday Morning" Released: August 1967; 2. "Dream Weaver" Released: November 1967; 3. "Don't Blame It on Your Wife" Released: March 1968; 4. "Don't Make Promises" Released: March 1968

Another Side of Rick is the sixteenth studio album by American singer Rick Nelson and his tenth for Decca Records. It was released on November 13, 1967. Jimmie Haskell arranged the album and John Boylan produced it.

The album was released on compact disc by Ace Records on September 29, 1998, as tracks 1 through 12 on a pairing of two albums on one CD with tracks 13 through 23 consisting of Nelson's 1969 album, Perspective. Bear Family included the album in the 2008 For You: The Decca Years box set.

== Production ==
Another Side of Rick was John Boylan's first production. The album was a thickly produced collection of songs from Koppelman-Rubim songwriters with the modern touch. These included Tim Hardin, John Sebastian, Boylan, and his brother, Terry Boylan. John Boylan selected a number of contemporary songs for the album: "Barefoot Boy", "Dream Weaver", "Suzanne on a Sunday Morning", and "I Wonder If Louise Is Home". Terry Boylan sang "Don't Blame It on Your Wife," which Rick Nelson didn't want to sing, saying "I want to sing the kind of thing I always wanted to, something I can close my eyes to with feeling" like Ray Charles. Instead, Nelson recorded "Georgia On My Mind." Rick Nelson also co-wrote two songs: "Marshmallow Skies" with James Burton, and "Promenade in Green", with John Boylan.

== Reception ==
Professional ratings
Review scores
Source	Rating
AllMusic	2/5 stars
The Encyclopedia of Popular Music	2/5 stars
Record Mirror	4/5 stars

Another Side of Rick was not considered a success, in part because songs like "Marshmallow Skies," "Promenade in Green," "Dream Weaver," and "Suzanne on a Sunday Morning" were alien to the Nelson image. even The Encyclopedia of Popular Music said that album was "flawed or lacking in some way." Richie Unterberger of AllMusic said that "It was about as good a strategy as any, considering his tried-and-true rock-a-ballad format wasn't working. But giving him fruity psychedelic Baroque production wasn't the answer, either, indeed yielding rather embarrassing results."

Historian John Einarson stated that Nelson's albums "Perspective and Another Side of Rick, embraced both folk and pop, with covers of Eric Andersen, Nilsson, Paul Simon, and Randy Newman. The eclectic choices reveal an artist still searching for a style that would reconcile his past and give him a future." Billboard selected the album for a "Pop Special Merit" review, and stated that Nelson "tackles the old standard "Georgia on My Mind" and the newer standard "Daydream with success."

Record Mirror described the album as "An interesting LP" and stated that "it found some interesting item...... here - apart from the many Timmy Hardin tracks, all of which are carefully, but unadventurously recorded", giving the album a four-star rating. Cashbox described the album as "a compelling manner" and stated that "The songs are soft and gentle" Record World described the album as "An especially attractive album.". Both The Encyclopedia of Popular Music and AllMusic gave the album a two-star ratings.

== Track listing ==
=== Side one ===
No.	Title	Writer(s)	Length
1.	"Dream Weaver"	John Boylan	2:51
2.	"Marshmallow Skies"	James Burton, Ricky Nelson	2:15
3.	"Don't Blame It on Your Wife"	Terence Boylan	2:36
4.	"Reason to Believe"	Tim Hardin	3:43
5.	"Suzanne on a Sunday Morning"	John Boylan	1:55
6.	"Baby Close Its Eyes"	Tim Hardin	1:39

=== Side two ===
No.	Title	Writer(s)	Length
1.	"Barefoot Boy"	John Boylan	2:35
2.	"Don't Make Promises"	Tim Hardin	2:48
3.	"Promenade in Green"	John Boylan, Ricky Nelson	2:12
4.	"Georgia on My Mind"	Hoagy Carmichael Stuart Gorrell	2:39
5.	"Daydream"	John Sebastian	2:39
6.	"I Wonder If Louise Is Home"	John Boylan	2:18
