= Happy Anniversary (Little River Band song) =

1977 single by Little River Band

- German picture sleeve

Single by Little River Band

from the album Diamantina Cocktail
- B-side: "The Inner Light" "Changed and Different"
- Released: December 1977
- Recorded: 1976
- Studio: Armstrong Studios, Melbourne
- Genre: Pop
- Length: 3:30 (single version); 4:04 (album version); 4:35 (alternative version)
- Label: EMI
- Songwriters: Beeb Birtles, David Briggs
- Producers: Little River Band, John Boylan

Little River Band singles chronology
"Home on Monday" (1977)	"Happy Anniversary" (1977)	"Shut Down Turn Off" (1978)

"Happy Anniversary" is a pop music song by Australian group Little River Band, released in territories outside of Australia in December 1977 as the fourth and final single from the group's third studio album, Diamantina Cocktail (April 1977). It was co-written by Beeb Birtles and David Briggs. The song became the band's second top twenty single in the United States, peaking at number 16 in March 1978 on the Billboard Hot 100.

== Background ==
"Happy Anniversary" appeared on Australian group Little River Band's third studio album, Diamantina Cocktail (April 1977). It was recorded, with the rest of the album, by the line-up of Beeb Birtles on guitar and vocals, David Briggs on lead guitar, Graeham Goble on guitar and vocals, George McArdle on bass guitar, Derek Pellicci on drums and Glenn Shorrock on vocals at Armstrong Studios, Melbourne with John Boylan and the group producing. "Happy Anniversary" was co-written by Birtles and Briggs.

For the local market, Diamantina Cocktail's singles were, "Help Is on Its Way" (April 1977), "Witchery" (August) and "Home on Monday" (November). For the international market "Happy Anniversary" was issued in December 1977 as the album's second single behind "Help Is on Its Way" (May). In the United States it peaked at number 16 in March 1978 on the Billboard Hot 100.

== Reception ==
Julie Meldrum of The Canberra Times reviewed Diamantina Cocktail and observed, "'Witchery', 'LA in the Sunshine' and 'Happy Anniversary' are all catchy numbers although after I had listened to 'Happy Anniversary' a few times the lyrics began to grind and become somewhat banal." AllMusic's Stephen Thomas Erlewine described how the album, "spawning the hit singles 'Happy Anniversary' and 'Help Is on Its Way'... With its laidback, sweet country-rock, [it] has a similar sound to the band's debut, but the melodies are a little sharper and catchier... better, more fully-rounded collection." Record World said that "an acappella chorus is the chief hook; the style is basic r&b."

== Track listing ==
European 7" (EMI 2702)
Side A. "Happy Anniversary" - 3:30
Side B. "The Inner Light"

North American 7" (Harvest 4524)
Side A. "Happy Anniversary" - 3:30
Side B. "Changed and Different" - 3:50

== Charts ==
Chart (1978)	Peak position
Canada Top Singles (RPM)	21
US Billboard Hot 100	16
