= Some Days You Eat the Bear =

Some Days You Eat the Bear and Some Days the Bear Eats You

Studio album by Ian Matthews
- Released: April 1974
- Recorded: December 1973–January 1974
- Studio: Elektra, Hollywood CA
- Genre: Country rock
- Length: 33:41
- Label: Elektra
- Producer: Ian Matthews

Ian Matthews chronology
Journeys from Gospel Oak (1974)	Some Days You Eat the Bear and Some Days the Bear Eats You (1974)	Go for Broke (1976)

Professional ratings
Review scores
Source	Rating
AllMusic	3/5 stars
Christgau's Record Guide	C+

Some Days You Eat the Bear and Some Days the Bear Eats You is the 1974 album by country rock/folk rock musician Ian Matthews.

The original vinyl album was released worldwide by Elektra Records in mid-April 1974, the second of two Ian Matthews solo albums released on that label (the first being Valley Hi in 1973), and featured various well-known session musicians such as David Lindley, Al Garth, Jeff Baxter from Steely Dan, and others. It also featured bandmates, guitarist Andy Roberts and drummer Timi Donald, from the first Plainsong album, In Search of Amelia Earhart.

The album was reissued on CD by Elektra in 1991 and has twice been reissued as a 2-on-1 remastered release with Valley Hi, first by Water Records in 2003, and more recently by BGO Records in 2017.

== Track listing ==
1. "Ol' '55" (Tom Waits) - 3:12
2. "I Don't Wanna Talk About It" (Danny Whitten) - 3:48
3. "A Wailing Goodbye" (Ian Matthews) - 2:52
4. "Keep On Sailing" (Ian Matthews) - 4:37
5. "Tried So Hard" (Gene Clark) - 3:00
6. "Dirty Work" (Donald Fagen, Walter Becker) - 2:51
7. "Do I Still Figure in Your Life" (Pete Dello) - 2:51
8. "Home" (Ian Matthews) - 3:12
9. "Biloxi" (Jesse Winchester) - 4:18
10. "The Fault" (Ian Matthews) - 3:00

== Personnel ==
- Ian Matthews - acoustic guitar, vocals
- Jeff "Skunk" Baxter - electric, acoustic and pedal steel guitar
- David Lindley - lap steel guitar
- B. J. Cole - pedal steel guitar
- David Barry - organ, piano, keyboards
- Andy Roberts - acoustic guitar
- Joel Tepp - acoustic guitar, harmonica
- Michael Fonfara - piano, keyboards
- Lyn Dobson - alto saxophone
- Al Garth - alto saxophone
- Jay Lacy - electric guitar
- Willie Leacox - drums
- Danny Lane - drums on "Tried So Hard"
- Timi Donald - drums on "Keep On Sailing"
- Danny Weis - electric and acoustic guitar
- Steve Gillette - acoustic guitar
- David Dickey - bass
- Billy Graham - bass on "Tried So Hard"
- Bob Warford - electric guitar on "Tried So Hard"

Production

- Producer: Ian Matthews
- Recording Engineer: Fritz Richmond at Elektra Sound Recorders, Hollywood CA
- Album Design: Brian D McLaughlin with assistance from Ian and Christina Matthews
- Photography/Cover Art: Front and back cover: Brian D McLaughlin; Insert: Christina Matthews
- Liner Notes: Linda Hennrick
