= Perspective (Rick Nelson album) =

Studio album by Rick Nelson
- Released: February 2, 1969
- Genres: Rock and roll; psychedelic pop
- Length: 30:56
- Label: Decca
- Producer: John Boylan

Rick Nelson chronology
| Another Side of Rick (1967) | Perspective (1969) | In Concert at the Troubadour, 1969 (1970) |

Perspective is the seventeenth studio album by American singer Rick Nelson, and his eleventh for Decca Records.

The album was a departure from Nelson's previous rockabilly records and an experiment in a more contemporary orchestral style. Like Nelson's prior album Another Side of Rick, it was produced by John Boylan. Boylan selected a number of contemporary songs for the album, including four by Randy Newman, who was not yet a well known songwriter. He also contributed two of his own songs, while Nelson's wife Kris performed vocals on "Hello to the Wind" (a joint Boylan/Nelson composition) and supplied album artwork. The album was recorded at TTG, Wally Heider, and Sunset Sound Studios in Hollywood between March–April 1968 and released in late August. Once sessions were complete, Telecaster icon James Burton left Nelson's band after an 11-year friendship and focused on his round-the-clock session work with the Wrecking Crew until Elvis Presley requested he join his TCB band ahead of his July–August 1969 comeback engagement at the International Hotel in Las Vegas.

Neither of the two Boylan-produced albums were a commercial success. Although Nelson grew to dislike Perspective's overproduced style, he credits the album with clarifying his future musical direction. "Perspective with those songs was a complete experiment and those Steve Miller type sound effects between tracks were my idea.... I'm not sorry I did those things because, if anything, it made up my mind as to the way I wanted to go... I just simplified the whole thing and went back to the formula of drums, bass, and guitar. That's where I'd always been most effective."

The album was released on compact disc by Ace Records on September 29, 1998, as tracks 13 through 23 on a pairing of two albums on one CD with tracks 1 through 12 consisting of Nelson's 1967 studio album, Another Side of Rick. Bear Family included the album in the 2008 For You: The Decca Years box set.

== Reception ==
Professional ratings
Review scores
| Source | Rating |
|---|---|
| AllMusic | 2/5 stars |
| The Encyclopedia of Popular Music | 1/5 stars |

Billboard selected the album for a "Pop Special Merit" review, and described as "an appealing, left - field type of tune"

Record World noted John and Rick "have chosen marvelous contemporary ballads and Rick sings his best."

Ernie Santosuosso published a review in the Boston Globe and argued, "It's not bubblegum rock, but neither is it the acid kind. Whatever 'Perspective' may be, it's a different Rick Nelson, still unexcitable but not nearly so bland. This album indicates he is developing a bent for singing thinking man's rock. He deserves an 'A' for effort."

Historian John Einarson stated that Nelson's albums "Perspective and Another Side of Rick embraced both folk and pop, with covers of Eric Andersen, Nilsson, Paul Simon, and Randy Newman. The eclectic choices reveal an artist still searching for a style that would reconcile his past and give him a future."

Richie Unterberger of AllMusic said that "Nelson did have good taste in selecting material, covering songs by Paul Simon, Richie Havens, Harry Nilsson, and Randy Newman, all of whom (except Simon) were little known by most of the public in 1967; indeed, Nelson covers five Newman songs in a row to end the album, creating the effect of an aborted "Nelson Sings Newman" concept record. The Encyclopedia of Popular Music gave the album a one-star rating, which meant that the album was classified as "poor".

== Track listing ==
=== Side one ===
| No. | Title | Writer(s) | Length |
|---|---|---|---|
| 1. | "When the Sun Shined Its Face on Me" | Reid Whitelaw | 2:19 |
| 2. | "Without Her" | Harry Nilsson | 2:32 |
| 3. | "The Lady Stayed with Me" | John Boylan | 2:19 |
| 4. | "Three Day Eternity" | Richie Havens | 2:22 |
| 5. | "For Emily, Whenever I May Find Her" | Paul Simon | 2:43 |
| 6. | "Stop by My Window" | John Boylan | 2:52 |

=== Side two ===
| No. | Title | Writer(s) | Length |
|---|---|---|---|
| 1. | "Hello to the Wind" | John Boylan, Ricky Nelson | 3:05 |
| 2. | "Wait 'til Next Year" | Randy Newman | 2:29 |
| 3. | "Love Story" | Randy Newman | 2:59 |
| 4. | "So Long Dad/Love Story (Reprise) [Medley]" | Randy Newman | 3:57 |
| 5. | "I Think It's Going to Rain Today" | Randy Newman | 3:19 |
