= Walking a Changing Line =

Studio album by Iain Matthews
- Released: 1988
- Genre: New age, folk, pop
- Label: Windham Hill
- Producer: Mark Hallman, Iain Matthews

Iain Matthews chronology
Shook (1984)	Walking a Changing Line (1988)	Nights in Manhattan (1988)

Walking a Changing Line is an album by the English musician Iain Matthews, released in 1988. All of its songs were written by the American musician Jules Shear. Walking a Changing Line was the first album that included vocals to be released by Windham Hill Records. Matthews supported it with a North American tour. He considered Walking a Changing Line to be a combination of new age, folk, and pop.

== Production ==
The album was produced by Mark Hallman and Matthews. Matthews's girlfriend had encouraged him to think about highlighting the work of Shear. After reviewing around 120 Shear songs, Matthews made a list of 30 to consider, and then, with Hallman, chose 12 for the CD release. Van Dyke Parks composed the music for "Only a Motion"; Osamu Kitajima (who played a koto), Fred Simon, and Patrick O'Hearn were among the musicians who worked on other tracks. "Alive Alone" is a duet with the American musician Eliza Gilkyson. "On Squirrel Hill" is about a man seeking comfort by returning to a familiar place from his past.

== Critical reception ==
Professional ratings
Review scores
Source	Rating
AllMusic	3/5 stars
The Encyclopedia of Popular Music	3/5 stars
The Great Rock Discography	5/10
MusicHound Rock: The Essential Album Guide	3/5 stars
The Philadelphia Inquirer	3/4 stars
The Rolling Stone Album Guide	3/5 stars

The Philadelphia Inquirer called Walking a Changing Line "an undeniably pretty album", but noted that Matthews "doesn't bring as much feeling to the work as its perennially hoarse author." The Toronto Star labeled the album "an instant classic", opining that "Shear's aching, difficult songs... are perfectly suited to Matthews's pure, steady, tenor." The Washington Post said that "all the cuts, even the multitracked a cappella 'On Squirrel Hill', composed for this album, have the wistful Windham Hill house sound [and would be at home] as background music for TV's thirtysomething."

The Chicago Tribune concluded that "the spare synthesizer-laden arrangements could use some of the tartness the songs have, but Matthews's voice is as sweet as ever and the lyrics brim with thoughtful yearning." The Kansas City Times deemed the album one "of the better New Age offerings", noting that "Matthews has a pleasant, slightly overripe voice". The Birmingham Evening Mail considered Walking a Changing Line "a long-overdue comeback."

AllMusic stated, "Often, dated keyboard sounds and soporific synth preludes do become intrusive, not to mention indulgent, but it's a credit to Matthews's skill as an interpreter and Shear's brilliant songs that things never degenerate into new age mush."

== Track listing ==
No.	Title	Length
1.	"Dream Sequence"
2.	"Standing Still"
3.	"Except for a Tear"
4.	"Following Every Finger"
5.	"Alive Alone"
6.	"Smell of Home"
7.	"On Squirrel Hill"
8.	"Shadows Break"
9.	"This Fabrication"
10.	"Lovers by Rote"
11.	"Only a Motion"
12.	"Why Fight"
