= Iain Matthews =

English musician (born 1946)

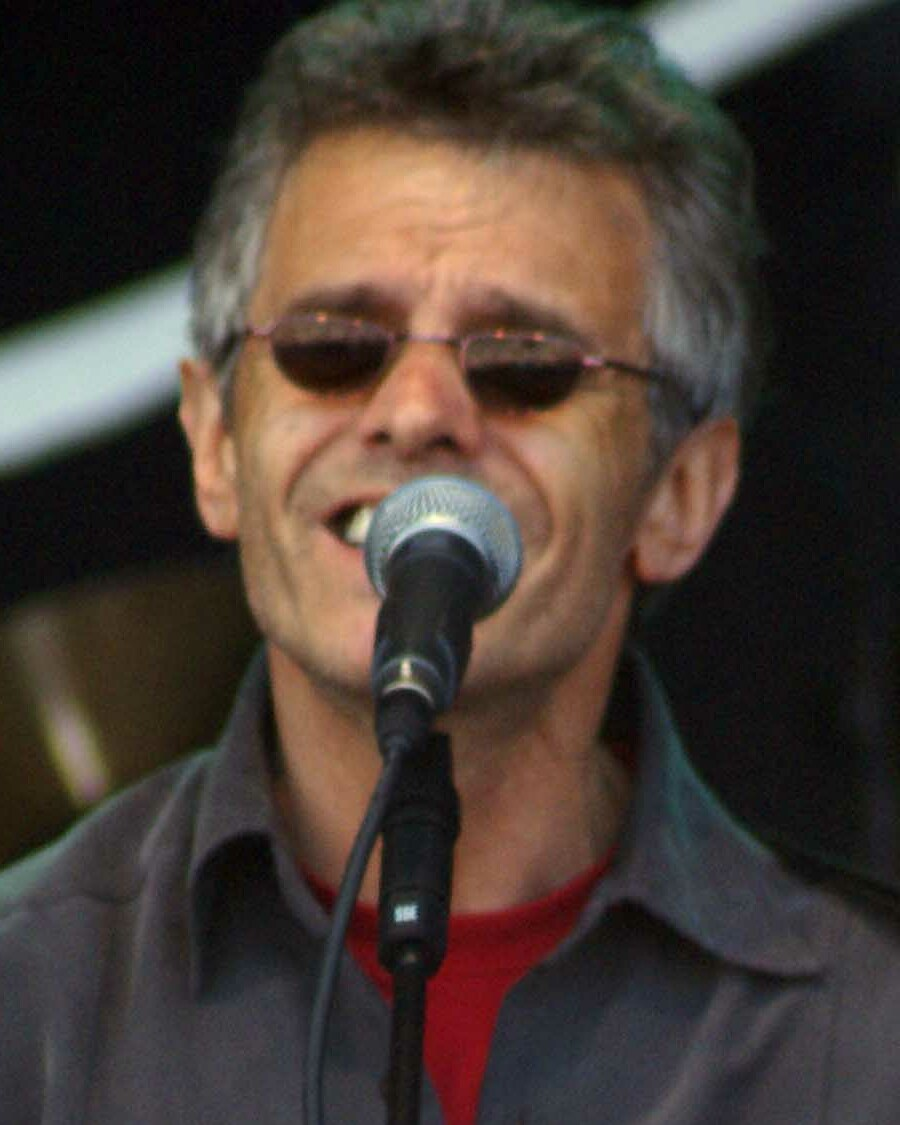
- Matthews performing in 2007

Background information
- Also known as: Ian MacDonald; Ian Matthews; Iain Matthews
- Born: Ian Matthews MacDonald; 16 June 1946 (age 80); Barton-upon-Humber, Lincolnshire, England
- Genres: Country rock; folk; pop; rock
- Occupations: Musician; singer; songwriter
- Instruments: Vocals; guitar; percussion
- Years active: 1967–present
- Labels: Decca; Deram; Polydor; Uni/MCA; Vertigo; Elektra; Columbia/CBS; Mushroom; Windham Hill; Mooncrest; Gold Castle; Perfect Pitch; Blue Rose; Brilliant; Watermelon; Omnivore; Fledg'ling; MK2
- Member of: Matthews Southern Comfort
- Formerly of: Fairport Convention; Plainsong
- Website: iainmatthews.nl

Iain Matthews (born Ian Matthews MacDonald, 16 June 1946) is an English musician. He was an original member of the British folk rock band Fairport Convention from 1967 to 1969 before leaving to form his own band, Matthews Southern Comfort, which had a UK number one in 1970 with their cover of Joni Mitchell's "Woodstock". In 1979, his recording of Terence Boylan's "Shake It" reached No. 13 on the US charts.

Born in Barton-upon-Humber, Lincolnshire, Matthews was known in the 1960s as Ian MacDonald. He changed his name to Ian Matthews (his mother's maiden name) in 1968 to avoid confusion with Ian McDonald of King Crimson. In 1989 he changed the spelling of his first name to Iain, and has been known as Iain Matthews ever since.

Influenced by both rock and roll and folk music, Matthews has performed solo and as a member of various bands. He was a member of Fairport Convention during the band's early period when they were heavily influenced by American folk rock and sang on their first three albums before leaving in 1969. He initially embarked upon a solo career before forming the bands Matthews Southern Comfort and Plainsong. Later in his career he was also a member of the bands Hi-Fi, No Grey Faith, and More Than a Song. In the 2000s he twice revived Plainsong and Matthews Southern Comfort (MSC) and continues to tour regularly with the current version of MSC. A new MSC album, The New Mine, was released in March 2020, and a vinyl-only album Fake Tan, recorded with Norwegian band the Salmon Smokers, was released in September 2020.

In a career spanning over fifty years, Matthews has featured on over 100 albums. In 2018 he published an autobiography co-written with author and broadcaster Ian Clayton, Thro' My Eyes: A Memoir, about his life in the music industry.

== Early life ==
Matthews' family moved to Scunthorpe, Lincolnshire, when he was twelve years old. After leaving school at sixteen he worked as an apprentice signwriter for a local painting and decorating firm. During the British pop music explosion of the mid-1960s he sang with local bands in Scunthorpe. He moved to London in the spring of 1965 and took a job in a Carnaby Street shoe shop, Ravel. In 1966 he formed a trio, The Pyramid (later just 'Pyramid'), a short-lived English surf music band, with Al Jackson and Steve Hiett (born 1940, died 2018). Hiett later became a world-renowned fashion photographer. The Pyramid released one single, "Summer of Last Year", in January 1967 on Deram Records. A remaining song, "Me About You," surfaced on Matthews' Orphans & Outcasts Volume 3 compilation album in 1999.

== Early career ==
In the winter of 1967 Matthews was recruited by Ashley Hutchings as a vocalist for Fairport Convention, where he sang with Judy Dyble on their self-titled first album Fairport Convention and with Sandy Denny on What We Did On Our Holidays. During the recording of Unhalfbricking in 1969, as Fairport increasingly drew their material from a traditional British folk repertoire, Matthews was not invited to a recording session. After a discussion with producer Joe Boyd and Hutchings, he left the band and departed on a musical direction of his own.

== Matthews Southern Comfort ==
In 1969 Matthews recorded his debut solo album, Matthews' Southern Comfort, which was rooted in American country music and rockabilly. He made the album with ex-Fairport colleagues Richard Thompson, Simon Nicol and Ashley Hutchings, plus guitarist Mark Griffiths, drummers Ray Duffy and Gerry Conway, pedal steel guitarist Gordon Huntley, and keyboardists Dolly Collins and Roger Coulam. This was his first significant experience recording as a songwriter. The band also performed Neil Young and Ian and Sylvia covers. He formed a working band, Matthews Southern Comfort (using the name of his first album, but without the apostrophe), and released two more albums, Second Spring (1970 – UK #52) and Later That Same Year (1970).

The band went through several line-ups and toured extensively for the next two years. They had one commercial success with Joni Mitchell's "Woodstock", which was a number one hit in the UK Singles Chart in October 1970. It received heavy airplay in Canada, reaching No. 5, as well as peaking at No. 23 on the Billboard singles charts in the United States in 1971. Matthews left Southern Comfort and the band released three albums of their own on Harvest Records.

== Plainsong ==
In 1971 Matthews recorded two solo albums, (If You Saw Thro' My Eyes and Tigers Will Survive), on Vertigo Records. Under the sponsorship of former Yardbird Paul Samwell-Smith, and in the company of like-minded British semi-folkies (notably ex-Fairporter Richard Thompson), he formed the band Plainsong with Andy Roberts, previously of The Liverpool Scene. The band's line-up consisted of Matthews, Roberts, guitarist Dave Richards and American bassist Bob Ronga.

In 1972 Plainsong released In Search of Amelia Earhart. The album included a cover of David McEnery's "Amelia Earhart's Last Flight", plus a song by Matthews, "True Story of Amelia Earhart's Last Flight". The song is based on research that suggested Amelia Earhart may have been spying on Japanese bases in the Pacific islands. It also included "Even the Guiding Light", an answer to Thompson's "Meet on the Ledge".

== Moving around ==
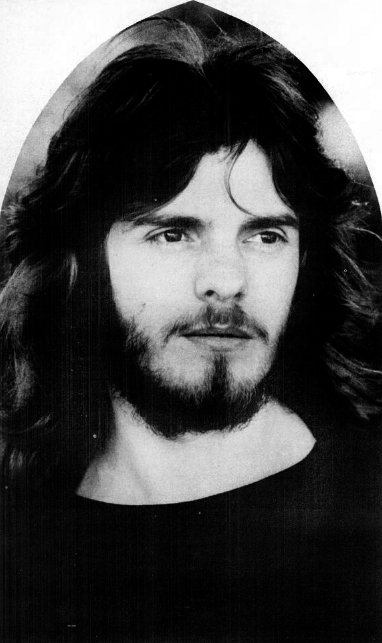
Matthews in 1972

After Plainsong collapsed as a result of a bandmate's alcoholism, and with his musical career now based in Los Angeles, Matthews released several more albums with ad hoc bands: Valley Hi (1973), produced by Michael Nesmith (formerly of the Monkees); Journeys from Gospel Oak and Some Days You Eat The Bear (1974); Go For Broke (1976) and Hit and Run (1977). None of these met with commercial success. Valley Hi featured a cover of the Steve Young song "Seven Bridges Road", arranged by Matthews and Nesmith with multitracked harmony, all parts of which were sung by Matthews. This version became famous after being covered live by the Eagles in 1980 and released on Eagles Live. His albums were not successful, and Matthews moved from Elektra Records to Columbia Records and from Columbia to the small Rockburgh label, where he scored a hit single in 1978 with a cover of Terence Boylan's "Shake It" which reached No. 13 on the US charts and No. 6 in Canada.

He had a moderately successful follow-up with Robert Palmer's "Give Me an Inch". The North American rights for his album Stealin' Home and its follow-up Siamese Friends were held by the small Canadian label Mushroom, and when label owner Shelly Siegel died in 1979 Matthews' association with the label ended. His song "Shake It" is heard at the beginning of the 1980 movie Little Darlings and in the game The Warriors from Rockstar Games.

Matthews' official website states that at this point he "had been struggling for nearly 15 years" and was still living hand to mouth, with nothing to show for his efforts "but a string of out-of-print albums and the loyalty of those musicians and fans who shared his vision." He moved from Los Angeles to Seattle, where he teamed up with David Surkamp, formerly of the St. Louis band Pavlov's Dog, to form the power pop band Hi-Fi. This band's repertoire included Matthews originals, Neil Young's "Mr. Soul" and Prince's "When You Were Mine". Matthews worked in an A&R capacity at Island Records and then Windham Hill Records.

== Later career ==
From 1977 Fairport Convention held an annual reunion festival at Cropredy in Oxfordshire and in the mid-1980s there was interest in reviving the band and recording new material. Matthews was invited to perform as a part of the band at the 1986 Cropredy Festival and this led to an album, Walking a Changing Line (1988) on Windham Hill Records, a tribute to Jules Shear of Jules and the Polar Bears. Matthews moved to Austin, Texas, and recorded several albums for a series of German independent labels. He appeared with Andy Roberts at the 1992 Cambridge Folk Festival, which inspired the first of what became several versions of Plainsong.

In 2000 Matthews moved to Amsterdam, where he became involved in independent music projects and collaborations, including the Sandy Denny tribute band No Grey Faith and another revival of Plainsong. ('No Grey Faith' being an anagram of "Fotheringay," the name of the castle in Northamptonshire in which Mary Queen of Scots was imprisoned, the title of a song that Denny had recorded for Fairport Convention, and the name of a short-lived band Denny had led in the 1970s.) Matthews moved to Horst in the Netherlands and in 2008 produced Joy Mining with the Dutch jazz ensemble Searing Quartet. In September 2010 he released the first Matthews Southern Comfort album in 40 years and returned to a major record label.

Since 2003 Matthews has worked with Dutch pianist and composer Egbert Derix. They met when Matthews, a jazz fan, came to a concert of Derix's Searing Quartet in Cambrinus (Horst, The Netherlands). Matthews invited Derix to join the 2003 tour of his 1970 album If You Saw Thro' My Eyes and they played a series of concerts with Eric Coenen (bass), Arthur Lijten (drums) and Ad Vanderveen (guitar). After the tour Matthews and Derix started writing together, resulting in the 2008 album Joy Mining. Matthews and Derix started their own label, MatriX. In 2012, the Iain Matthews/Egbert Derix album In the Now was released by Verve Records. Joy Mining and In the Now had separate releases in the United Kingdom and United States.

In December 2011, Matthews performed as Matthews Southern Comfort with his Dutch band at the 2nd Great British Folk Festival at Butlins Skegness and performed a set of old and new songs. In January 2014 he toured as part of the Gene Clark No Other band, performing Gene Clark's album No Other with singers including Robin Pecknold of the Fleet Foxes

In January–February 2015, Matthews and Derix toured in California to promote the US releases of their albums. Dutch filmmakers Peter Jong and Olivier Hamaker made a documentary about the making of In the Now. Matthews can also be heard on Egbert Derix' solo album Paintings in Minor Lila (2012), on which the music of British progressive rock band Marillion is featured. The album had contributions by Matthews, Marillion singers Fish and Steve Hogarth, and Supertramp saxophonist John Helliwell. Matthews was guest vocalist in 2011 on the Helliwell/Derix Quintet tour in The Netherlands. Matthews and Derix co-wrote eight songs for Matthews's solo album The Art of Obscurity (2013).

== Thro' My Eyes: A Memoir ==
In 2018 Matthews released an autobiography, Thro’ My Eyes: A Memoir. The book was co-written with Featherstone-based author and broadcaster, Ian Clayton. Clayton was contacted in 2010 by Matthews who had read his book Bringing It all Back Home, described by Record Collector magazine as "one of the best books about popular music ever written". It was several years before the project came to fruition as a co-written book.

Thro’ My Eyes: A Memoir was published by Pontefract-based Route Publishing in August 2018 in two editions, Standard and Deluxe. The Deluxe edition included an exclusive 2-CD compilation of 23 songs from Matthews’ career. The book describes Matthews’ life and musical career, from his beginnings in Barton-upon-Humber and Scunthorpe; moving to London in the 1960s and joining Fairport Convention; forming Matthews Southern Comfort in 1970 and having a #1 hit with their version of Joni Mitchell’s "Woodstock"; forming Plainsong with Andy Roberts in 1972; spending years in America as a solo artist; and returning to Europe in 2000 to continue making albums and touring.

Matthews also described watching and playing football as a boy in Scunthorpe, a failed trial as a potential professional footballer with Bradford Park Avenue, and his life-long love of Manchester United. A live concert recording of Plainsong in Paris in 2007 revealed him telling the audience that the words of his song "Busby's Babes", from the 1990 album Pure And Crooked, were displayed in the Manchester United Museum.

Matthews and Clayton promoted the book in 2019 with a concert tour of 11 venues in England and Scotland, entitled "Words And Music". in which Matthews and Clayton talked about episodes from the book and Matthews performed live. He was joined on stage on one night at The Greys in Brighton by former Plainsong bandmate Andy Roberts. A paperback version of the book, with new artwork and an updated discography, was published by Route in March 2021.

== Videography ==
=== Ian Matthews ===
- London Revisited VHS Tape (1984) Castle Hendring (live concert recorded at the Marquee Club in London, 9 March 1984)
- Live In London DVD (2005) Magada International (same live concert at the Marquee Club as the London Revisited VHS tape)
- I Can't Fade Away DVD (2006) Cherry Red Films (same live concert at the Marquee Club as the London Revisited VHS tape)

=== Iain Matthews ===
- Compass & Chart Volume 1 (1994) VHS Tape Perfect Pitch (83-minute video retrospective by Michael Solomon documenting his time with Fairport Convention, Matthews Southern Comfort and Plainsong, and containing rare solo performances and interviews)
- Zumbach's Coat (2004) CD + DVD Blue Rose/Perfect Pitch (DVD features 6 songs live by Iain and Ad Vanderveen)
- Osolomeo (2006) DVD + CD Inbetweens Records (DVD is A Night In Colorado solo concert from October 1993)
- Contact (2007) CD + DVD Blue Rose (with Richard Kennedy and Mike Roelofs, live in Heilbronn, Germany, December 2004)
- Live at Rockpalast – Hamburg 1983 (2017) DVD + 2CD MIG

=== Matthews Southern Comfort ===
- Fairport Convention and Matthews Southern Comfort: Maidstone 1970 (2000) DVD Voiceprint (Tony Palmer film, total playing time 32 minutes)

=== More Than a Song ===
- Witness (2003) DVD Inbetweens Records (DVD has live clips of 3 full songs plus backstage footage and interviews. Total playing time 22 minutes)

=== Ad Vanderveen and Friends ===
- Late Bloomer Adventures (2004) DVD Sonic Rendezvous (Iain Matthews duets with Ad Vanderveen on three tracks)

=== Hi-Fi ===
- Complete Works (2006) CD + DVD Blue Rose (live footage of Hi-Fi, plus interviews with Iain Matthews and David Surkamp)
- The Complete Collection (2012) CD + DVD Rockville Records (re-issue of Complete Works, CD has 3 extra tracks compared to the 2006 version)

=== With Egbert Derix ===
- Afterwords (2010) CD + DVD MatriX (live concert at Acoustic Alley, Den Haag, 18 October 2009)
- That Is to Say (2012) DVD MatriX (live concert at The Music Star, Norderstedt, Germany, 12 May 2012 + 3 bonus tracks recorded 10 October 2010)
- The Making of 'In the Now' (2014) DVD Omnivore (~40-minute documentary about the making of the album)

=== With Nanci Griffith ===
- Other Voices, Too (1998) VHS Tape Elektra (Iain Matthews plays on this live performance filmed at The Armadillo in Glasgow, 26/27 November 1998)

== Discography ==
=== The Pyramid ===
- "The Summer of Last Year" / "Summer Evening" (1967) UK Deram (Iain Matthews’ first recording (45 rpm single))

=== Solo albums ===
- Matthews' Southern Comfort (1969) UK Uni/US Decca
- If You Saw Thro' My Eyes (1971) UK and US Vertigo
- Tigers Will Survive (1972) UK and US Vertigo
- Valley Hi (1973) UK and US Elektra
- Journeys from Gospel Oak (1974) UK Mooncrest
- Some Days You Eat the Bear...Some Days the Bear Eats You (1974) UK and US Elektra
- Go for Broke (1976) UK CBS/US Columbia
- Hit and Run (1977) UK CBS/US Columbia
- Stealin' Home (1978) UK Rockburgh/US Mushroom
- Siamese Friends (1979) UK Rockburgh/US Mushroom
- Discreet Repeat (1979) Rockburgh
- Spot of Interference (1980) UK Rockburgh/US RSO
- Shook (1984) Line Records/Polydor (France, Spain)
- Walking a Changing Line (1988) Windham Hill
- Nights in Manhattan (1988) Taxim Records (live at The Bottom Line in New York, May 1988)
- Pure and Crooked (1990) Gold Castle
- Live Alone: Notebook Series No. 2 (1991) Perfect Pitch
- Orphans & Outcasts Volume I 1969-1979 (1991) Dirty Linen
- Skeleton Keys (1992) Europe Line Records/US Mesa Bluemoon Recordings (different artwork)
- Intimate Wash: Notebook Series No. 3 (1993) Perfect Pitch
- Orphans & Outcasts Volume II 1981-1989 (1993) Dirty Linen
- The Soul of Many Places (1993) Elektra (compilation album)
- The Dark Ride (1994) Watermelon
- Pure and Crooked (1994) Watermelon (5 bonus tracks)
- Camouflage: Notebook Series No. 4 (1995) Perfect Pitch
- God Looked Down (1996) Watermelon
- The Seattle Years 1978–1984 (1996) Varèse Sarabande (compilation album)
- Nights in Manhattan (And Points West) (1997) DCC (4 bonus tracks)
- Excerpts from Swine Lake (1998) Blue Rose/US Tangible (4 bonus demo tracks)
- Orphans & Outcasts Volume 3 (1999) Perfect Pitch
- A Tiniest Wham/A Live Wham 2CD (2000) Blue Rose (Germany)/Perfect Pitch (UK); (2001) Last Call (France); CD2 Iain Matthews & the Swinelakers live in Nürnburg, Germany, September 1998
- If You Saw Thro' My Eyes (remaster) (2003) MK2 Records
- Zumbach's Coat (2004) MK2 Records/Perfect Pitch
- Zumbach's Coat CD + DVD (2004) Blue Rose/Perfect Pitch (DVD features 6 songs live by Iain and Ad Vanderveen)
- Sparkler 2CD (2005) Blue Rose (CD1 Best of the Texas Recordings 1989-2004; CD2 If You Saw Thro' My Eyes Live)
- If You Saw Thro' My Eyes Live (2006) Vinyl Japan/ItsAboutMusic
- Osolomeo DVD + CD (2006) Inbetweens Records (DVD is A Night in Colorado solo concert from October 1993; CD is Iain and Andy Roberts at the Brosella Festival July 1992)
- Journeys from Gospel Oak (Expanded Edition) (2006) Castle Music (includes 5 songs rerecorded in 2006 as bonus tracks)
- Go for Broke (2007) Vinyl Japan (limited edition Japanese CD of Go for Broke + 6 live bonus tracks recorded in Denver June 1976)
- Hit and Run (2007) Vinyl Japan (limited edition Japanese CD of Hit and Run + 7 live bonus tracks recorded at rehearsals in Los Angeles)
- Stealin' Home (2007) Vinyl Japan (limited edition Japanese CD of Stealin' Home + 9 live bonus tracks recorded at Texas A&M University in November 1978)
- Contact (2007) Blue Rose, CD + DVD (with Richard Kennedy and Mike Roelofs, live in Heilbronn, Germany, December 2004)
- Rhino Hi-Five: Ian Matthews (2007) Rhino/Elektra/Apple Music (5-track digital EP)
- Collected (2011) Universal (57-track 3CD career retrospective, all tracks chosen personally by Matthews)
- If You Saw Thro' My Eyes (remaster) (2012) Esoteric/Cherry Red
- Tigers Will Survive (2012) Esoteric/Cherry Red (original album remaster + bonus track)
- The Art of Obscurity (2013) MK2 Records/Omnivore Music/Fledg'ling
- Stealin' Home (2014) Omnivore (original album remaster + 9 live bonus tracks recorded at Texas A&M University in November 1978)
- Live at Rockpalast – Hamburg 1983 (2017) MIG (DVD + 2CD: CD1 is the audio version of the DVD; CD2 contains the studio versions of all the songs)
- Walking a Changing Line 2CD (2017) MIG (original album remaster + CD2 of outtakes)
- A Baker's Dozen (2017) MK2 Records
- Thro' My Eyes (2018) Route (2CD compilation released as part of the Deluxe edition of his "Thro' My Eyes" biography)

=== Box sets ===
- The Original Notebook Series (2002) Coast To Coast (Limited edition 5CD archival box set containing Live Alone, Intimate Wash, Camouflage, Nights In Manhattan And Points West, plus a fifth, then unreleased CD, Woodshedding)
- Orphans And Outcasts (2019) Cherry Red Records (4CD box set containing remastered versions of Orphans And Outcasts Volumes 1-3, plus a fourth CD of newly curated outtakes and demo recordings)

=== Slimline series ===
- Amen (2009) Perfect Pitch (live at Café de Amer, Amen with Bart Oostindie and Mike Roelofs)
- Woodshedding (2009) Perfect Pitch (single CD issue of CD5 from the Original Notebook Series box set)

=== 2-in-1 reissues / remasters ===
- If You Saw Thro’ My Eyes / Tigers Will Survive (1992) Vertigo
- Stealin’ Home / Siamese Friends (1999) Line Records
- Valley Hi / Some Days You Eat The Bear (2003) Water Records
- Stealin’ Home / Siamese Friends (2005 remaster) BGO Records
- Spot Of Interference / Shook (2005 remaster) BGO Records
- Go For Broke / Hit And Run (2006 remaster) BGO Records
- The Dark Ride / God Looked Down (2006 remaster) BGO Records
- Pure And Crooked / Skeleton Keys (2009 remaster) BGO Records
- Valley Hi / Some Days You Eat The Bear (2017 remaster) BGO Records
- If You Saw Thro’ My Eyes / Tigers Will Survive (2024 remaster) BGO Records

=== Groups ===
Fairport Convention

- Fairport Convention (1968) UK Polydor/US Cotillion
- What We Did On Our Holidays (1968) UK Island/US A&M (US release has an entirely different cover to the UK release)
- Unhalfbricking (1969) UK Island/US A&M
- The History Of Fairport Convention (1972) Island (2LP compilation)
- Fairport Chronicles (1972) A&M (2LP compilation)
- Heyday: The BBC Sessions 1968-69 (1986) UK Island/US Hannibal
- The Other Boot (1987) Dirty Linen (2 Cassette, the official bootleg of the 1986 Fairport Cropredy reunion)
- Meet On The Ledge The Classic Years (1967-1975) (1999) UK Island/US A&M
- What We Did On Our Holidays - An Introduction To Fairport Convention (1999) Island Masters
- The Other Boot/The Third Leg (2001) Woodworm (3CD, the official bootleg of the 1986/1987 Cropredy Festivals)
- Heyday: The BBC Sessions 1968-1969 Extended (2002) Island Remasters (8 bonus tracks)
- Cropredy 2002. Another Gig; Another Palindrome (2002) Woodworm
- Fairport Convention (2003) Island Remasters (Remastered CD with 4 bonus tracks, including a rare studio version of Leonard Cohen’s "Suzanne" featuring Matthews on solo vocal, also two live tracks from French TV and the first single)
- What We Did On Our Holidays (2003) Island Remasters (Remastered CD with 4 bonus, including a rare BBC live recording from February 1969)
- Across The Decades (2003) Snapper (2CD compilation)
- The Quiet Joys of Brotherhood (Live At The Cropredy Festivals 1986 and 1987) 2CD (2004) Shakedown
- Cropredy Capers (Twenty Five Years Of Fairport Convention And Friends At Cropredy Festival) (2004) Free Reed (4CD Box Set)
- Live At The BBC (2007) Island Remasters (4CD Box Set)
- More Things We Did On Our Holidays (The Cropredy Festivals) (2011) 2CD Secret (same as The Other Boot/The Third Leg)
- Come All Ye: The First Ten Years (2017) UMC (7CD Box Set)
- What We Did On Our Saturday (2018) 2CD (Live At 50th Anniversary Cropredy Festival) Matty Grooves

Matthews Southern Comfort

- Second Spring (1970) UK Uni/US Decca (US release has an entirely different cover to the UK release)
- Later That Same Year (1970) UK Uni/US Decca/ US Reissue Pickwick
- One, Two, Three... Too Good! (1970 German vinyl release) Teldec/MCA (2LP best of compilation)
- The Best Of Matthews Southern Comfort (1971 Japanese vinyl release) Victor Co. of Japan/MCA
- Best Of Matthews Southern Comfort (1974 vinyl; 1989 CD) MCA Records
- Ian Matthews’ Best In Early 70s (1979 Japanese vinyl release) Victor Musical Industries/MCA
- Matthews Southern Comfort Meet Southern Comfort (1987 vinyl compilation) See for Miles
- Scion (1994) UK Band Of Joy/US Dutch East India Trading (collection of outtakes and BBC recordings)
- The Essential Collection (1997) Half Moon (retrospective of 1970s recordings)
- Matthews’ Southern Comfort/Second Spring (1996) BGO Records
- Later That Same Year (2008 CD) BGO Records (original album remaster + 4 bonus tracks)
- Fairport Convention & Matthews Southern Comfort – Live In Maidstone 1970 (2009) Voiceprint (Soundtrack to the Tony Palmer film, two tracks by Matthews Southern Comfort)
- Kind Of New (2010) Brilliant/Genepool
- Kind Of Live (2011) Perfect Pitch
- Kind Of New/Kind of Live (2012) 2CD Esoteric / Cherry Red
- Matthews Southern Comfort: A Simple History Vol.1 (2017) MK2 Records (2017 tour album)
- Like A Radio (2018) MIG
- Bits And Pieces (2018) MIG (4-track limited edition 10" white vinyl EP including and alternative mix of "Woodstock")
- The New Mine (2020) MIG
- '"Hey Superman" (2020) (Digital single)
- "With a Little Help from My Friends" (2022) (Digital single)
- "I Feel Like I’m Fixing To Die Rag" (2023) (Digital single)
- "Spinning Wheel" (2023) (Digital single)
- The Woodstock Album (2023) Must Have Music

Plainsong

- In Search Of Amelia Earhart (1972 vinyl) UK and US Elektra
- In Search Of Amelia Earhart (1991 CD) Japan Elektra/Warner-Pioneer Corporation
- And That’s That - The Demos (1992) Taxim Records
- On Air - Original BBC Recordings (1992) Band of Joy (BBC recordings from 1972)
- Dark Side of the Room (1992) Line Records
- Voices Electric (1994) Line Records
- Sister Flute (1996) Line Records
- On Air (1997) Strange Fruit (original BBC album + 2 extra tracks)
- New Place Now (1999) Blue Rose (Germany)/Spin Along (UK)/Tangible (US)
- Live In Austria (1999) Plainsong (4-track mini-CD, live in Thalgau, 6 July 1997)
- A To B (2001) Spin Along (6-track mini-CD)
- In Search Of Amelia Earhart (CD 2001) Perfect Pitch
- Pangolins (2003) Blue Rose Records
- Plainsong (2005) 2CD Water Records (remaster of In Search Of Amelia Earhart, unreleased second album Now We Are 3, plus radio sessions, live recordings and singles)
- Fat Lady Singing (2012) Blue Rose Records
- Reinventing Richard: The Songs of Richard Fariña (2015) Fledg'ling
- In Search Of Amelia Earhart (CD re-issue 2016) Man In The Moon

Hamilton Pool

- Return To Zero (1995) Watermelon

Hi-Fi

- Demonstration Record (1981) SP&S Records (US)/(1982) Butt Records (UK)
- Moods for Mallards (1982) First American Records (US)/(1983) Shanghai Records (UK)
- Complete Works (2006) CD + DVD Blue Rose
- The Complete Collection (2012) CD + DVD Rockville Records (CD has 3 extra tracks compared to the 2006 version)

No Grey Faith

- Secrets All Told – The Songs Of Sandy Denny (2000) Perfect Pitch/Unique Gravity

More Than A Song

- More Than A Song (2001) Perfect Pitch/Coast To Coast
- Witness (2002) Turtle Records (live in Amsterdam)
- More Than A Song (2003) Under The Radar (US release contains two bonus live tracks, "Anchor" and "Lamb In Armor").

Iain Matthews & The Salmon Smokers

- Woodstock b/w Keep On Sailing (2019) New Noise (limited edition 45 rpm single)
- Fake Tan (2020) New Noise (vinyl LP)
- Fake Tan (2021) Talking Elephant (CD release with Keep On Sailing as a bonus track)

The Matthews Baartmans Conspiracy

- Distant Chatter (2021) Talking Elephant

=== Collaborations with other artists ===
With Julian Dawson

- Songs From The Red Couch (1996) Iglhauser (live in Thalgäu, 4 August 1996)
- Flood Damage (2002) Key-Wi (live in Thalgäu, 29 November 2002)

With Ad Vanderveen

- The Iain Ad Venture (2000) Blue Rose
- Ride The Times (2010) Turtle Records
- Greetings From Grolloo (2024) RADZ Records

With Elliott Murphy

- La terre commune (2001) Blue Rose/Perfect Pitch/Eminent

With Elliott Murphy and Olivier Durand

- Official Blue Rose Bootleg Series 2CD (2001) Blue Rose (live in Solingen, 1 June 2001)
- CD Ticket (2001) Blue Rose (2-track CD, "Cortez The Killer"/"I Don't Wanna Talk About It" recorded live in Germany, 27 May 2001)

With Searing Quartet

- Joy Mining (2008) Perfect Pitch

With Egbert Derix

- Afterwords (2010) CD + DVD MatriX (CD live at Café Thembi, Maastricht, 17 May 2009; DVD live at Acoustic Alley, Den Haag, 18 October 2009)
- In The Now (2012) Verve/Fledg'ling (UK), Omnivore (US)
- That Is To Say (2012) DVD MatriX (live concert at The Music Star, Norderstedt, Germany, 12 May 2012 + 3 bonus tracks recorded 10 October 2010)
- The Making Of 'In The Now' (2014) DVD Omnivore (~40-minute documentary about the making of the album)

With Andy Roberts

- Live At The Bonington Theatre, Nottingham 1991 (2021) Angel Air

With Jim Fogarty

- The Heart Of Saturday Night (2021) Limited edition live album recorded in Voorhees, NJ in 2011 and sold exclusively to fans on tour or by direct mail order

=== As a featured artist ===
With Nanci Griffith

- Other Voices, Too (A Trip Back to Bountiful) (1998) Elektra

With Nick Vernier Band

- Woodstock (2009) Brinker Media download

With Nick Vernier Band and Emitt Rhodes

- Time Will Show The Wiser (2010) Brinker Media download

=== As a guest artist ===
Matthews featured as a guest artist on the following albums, either singing lead vocals, harmony vocals or playing guitar.

- Marc Ellington: Marc Ellington (1969) Philips
- Marc Ellington: Rains/Reins Of Changes (1971) B&C
- Andy Roberts: Nina And The Dream Tree (1969) Pegasus
- Long Dancer: It Was So Simple (1972) Rocket
- Allan Taylor: The Lady (1969) United Artists
- Marc Ellington: Restoration (1973) Philips
- Andy Roberts: Urban Cowboy (1973) Elektra
- Bob Neuwirth: Bob Neuwirth (1974) Asylum
- Steve Gillette: Back On The Street Again (1975) Outpost
- Jackie Lomax: Livin' For The Lovin' (1976) Capitol
- Richard Thompson: (guitar, vocal) (1976) Island
- Julie Covington: Julie Covington (1978) Virgin
- Richard and Linda Thompson: First Light (1978) Chrysalis
- Matinee Idols: Leaving Limbo (1982) DVG Records (12-inch EP)
- Any Trouble: Any Trouble (1983) EMI America
- Bourgeois Tagg: Bourgeois Tagg (1986) Island USA
- Fred Simon: Usually/Always (1988) Windham Hill
- Christine Albert: You Are Gold (1990) Gambini Global Recordings (cassette-only release)
- Eric Taylor: Eric Taylor (1995) Watermelon
- Denice Franke: You Don't Know Me (1997) de nICE giRL
- Mike Rosenthal: Mike Rosenthal (1999) Red Truck
- Rainravens: Rose Of Jericho (1999) Blue Rose
- Jeff Talmadge: Spinning Of The World (2000) Bozart
- Ad Vanderveen: Here Now (2000) Hunter Music
- Ad Vanderveen: The Moment That Matters (2003) Blue Rose
- Willy Russell Hoovering The Moon (2003) WR Ltd.
- Ad Vanderveen & The O'Neils: Live, Burgerhaus, Heilbron (2004) Blue Rose
- BJ Baartmans: Where Lovers Go (2004) Inbetweens
- Jelle Paulusma: iRECORD (2008) Munich
- BJ Baartmans: Voor en Achter (2010) Continental Europe (2CD compilation)
- Lorrie Singer and Bradley Kopp: A Deep Oasis (2011) Redboot
- Egbert Derix: Paintings In Minor Lila (2012) Eggy D
- Bart de Win: Easy To See (2012) Shine A Light
- Henning Kvitnes: Scandicana (2012) Parlophone Norway
- Pete Mancini: Foothill Freeway (2017) Paradiddle

=== Unique compilation albums ===
Compilations containing unique Matthews material not available elsewhere:

- Various Artists 2 Meter Sessions, Vol.4 (1993) Radio Records: Iain Matthews "A Cross To Bear", recorded 8 September 1992, NOB radio session
- Various Artists SXSW Live, Vol.3 (1994) SXSW: Iain Matthews "God Looked Down", recorded Austin, Texas 17/19 March 1994
- Various Artists Broadcasts Vol.2 (1994) KGSR 2CD set: Iain Matthews "Evening Sun", recorded live for 107.1 KGSR/Radio Austin, Austin, Texas 1994
- Various Artists Liner - New Tracks 2. (1994) Line Records promo CD: Iain Matthews & Ian Cussick "Meet On The Ledge", recorded live at the Knust Club, Hamburg
- Various Artists Three Two One It's Alive From Studio A (1995) WCBE: Iain Matthews "Jumping Off The Roof", WCBE radio sessions 1995
- Various Artists What's That I Hear? The Songs Of Phil Ochs (1998) Siced Bread Records: Iain Matthews "Flower Lady"
- Various Artists Live Pa Halkaer Kro: Iain Matthews "I Drove", Danish radio recordings released 2000.
- Various Artists 30 Jaar Hubert On The Air (2003) L1 Records 3CD set: More Than A Song "Ballad Of Gruene Hall", “Heart Of A Man” and “Bare Necessities”, 1Limburg Dutch radio session
- Various Artists Tønder Festival 2003 (2003) Millstream Records: Plainsong "Barbed Wire Fence (live)”.
- Various Artists Tønder Festival 2012 (2012) Millstream Records: Plainsong "Charlie (live)”
- Various Artists Ever After: Tree Of Life (2016) Fyify! Records & Publishing : Iain Matthews "Alone Again Blues (live).

=== Line Records compilations ===
- Various Artists Another Christmas Gift from Line - 1987 (1987) 2CD set, Line Records promo compilation : Ian Matthews "Shorting Out".

In addition, several tracks recorded in the 1980s as Ian Matthews appear on a Line Records compilation series, Der Sampler.

- Der Sampler 1 (1986): "Wild Places"
- Der Sampler 9 (1986): "For The Lonely Hunter"
- Der Sampler 10 (1986): "Gimme An Inch Girl"
- Der Sampler 11 (1986): "Carefully Taught/Stealin’ Home"
- Der Sampler 13 (1986): "Hearts On The Line"
- Der Sampler 15 (1986): "Polly"
- Der Sampler 36 (1989): "Wild Places"
- Der Sampler 39 (1989): "See Me"
- Der Sampler 40 (1989): "Carefully Taught/Stealin’ Home"

=== Blue Rose Records compilations ===
Matthews tracks appeared on various Blue Rose Records compilation albums, either as a solo artist, with Plainsong, or with Elliott Murphy.

- Blue Rose Collection Vol.4 (1998): Iain Matthews "Where the Big Dogs Run"
- Blue Rose Collection Vol.6 (1999): Plainsong "Following Amelia", Iain Matthews "Gimme An Inch" live in Nuremberg.
- Blue Rose Collection Vol.7 (2001): Iain Matthews "The Power And The Glory", "Timing", "Mercy Street"
- Blue Rose Collection Vol.8 (2001): Elliot Murphy & Iain Matthews "One Cold Street"
- Blue Rose Collection Vol.10 (2003): Plainsong "Barbed Wire Fence"
- Blue Rose Collection Vol.11 (2004): Iain Matthews "Power"
- The Blue Rose Christmas Party 2006 (2007):

CD1 with Julian Dawson "Rain On The Roof", "Can't Buy Me Love"
CD2 Iain Matthews solo "The Frame", "Southern Wind"; with Julian Dawson "Crazy Love"; with Julian Dawson & Ad Vanderveen "Funk And Fire"; with Elliott Murphy & Olivier Durand "Blind Willie McTell"
CD3 The Blue Rose Rockestra - Iain Matthews "Da Doo Ron Ron", "Brown Eyed Girl", "I Believe In You", "For What It’s Worth/Feeling Alright"

- Various Artists – 1995 – 2015 / 20 Years Blue Rose Records – Best of Americana Rock Music Past and Present (2CD) (2015): Iain Matthews "Funk and Fire"
- Various Artists – 20 Years Blue Rose Records – Best of Americana Rock Music Vol. 2 Past and Present (2CD) (2015): Plainsong "Barbed Wire Fence"

=== Blue Rose Nuggets series ===
Unique Iain Matthews tracks also appear on several Blue Rose Nuggets compilation albums:

- Blue Rose Nuggets 1 (2002): Iain Matthews with Elliott Murphy and Olivier Durand "Girl with the Clouds in Her Eyes", live at Burgerhaus Heilbron-Bockingen, 27 May 2001.
- Blue Rose Nuggets 2 (2003): Iain Matthews and The Swinelakers "Reno Nevada", live at Hirsch, Nurnburg, 28 September 1998.
- Blue Rose Nuggets 3 (2003): Plainsong "Needle in the Hay".
- Blue Rose Nuggets 4 (2004): Iain Matthews "Funk and Fire".
- Blue Rose Nuggets 8 (2004): Iain Matthews "Cartwheel Avenue".
- Blue Rose Nuggets 11 (2005): Plainsong "Even the Guiding Light" recorded live at the Hospitalkirche in Schwäbisch Hall, Germany, 8 May 2003
- Blue Rose Nuggets 14 (2005): Iain Matthews "The Limburg Girl and the Travelling Man".
- Blue Rose Nuggets 23 (2007): Iain Matthews with Mike Roelofs, Richard Kennedy, and Sean Staples "Funk and Fire", live.
- Blue Rose Nuggets 24 (2007): Iain Matthews (as part of the Blue Rose Rockestra) "For What It's Worth/Feelin' Alright", live.
- Blue Rose Nuggets 27 (2007): Plainsong "Footsteps Fall".
- Blue Rose Nuggets 32 (2008): Iain Matthews with Elliott Murphy "Close to the Bone"
- Blue Rose Nuggets 33 (2008): Iain Matthews "Something Mighty"
- Blue Rose Nuggets 36 (2009): Iain Matthews "Something Mighty"
- Blue Rose Nuggets 42 (2010): Iain Matthews with Elliott Murphy "Big Umbrella"
- Blue Rose Nuggets 46 (2010): Plainsong "Here Comes the Rain".
- Blue Rose Nuggets 54 (2012): Iain Matthews "The Onliest"
- Blue Rose Nuggets 57 (2012): Plainsong "Sloth".
- Blue Rose Nuggets 86 (2018): Iain Matthews "Like Dominoes"
- Blue Rose Nuggets 92 (2018): Iain Matthews "Touching the Fleece"
- Blue Rose Nuggets 95 (2019): Plainsong "I Can't Let Go".
- Blue Rose Nuggets 96 (2019): Iain Matthews "Sister"
- Blue Rose Nuggets 97 (2019): Iain Matthews with Elliott Murphy "The Ballad of the Soldier's Wife"
- Blue Rose Nuggets 100 (2019): Iain Matthews with Elliott Murphy "I Don't Wanna Talk About It" recorded live in Heilbronn, Germany on 27 May 2001

=== Other compilation albums ===
Iain Matthews tracks appear on some 90 compilation CDs, and the Matthews Southern Comfort 1970 No. 1 UK single "Woodstock" appears on over 200 compilation CDs.

=== Billboard/RPM charts ===
Hot 100 Singles

- "Woodstock", Matthews Southern Comfort (Band) (No. 23, No. 5 Canada, 1971)
- "Mare, Take Me Home", Matthews Southern Comfort (Band) (No. 96, No. 86 Canada, 1971)
- "Tell Me Why", Matthews Southern Comfort (Band) (No. 98, 1971)
- "Da Doo Ron Ron (When He Walked Me Home)" (No. 96, No. 68 Canada, 1972)
- "Shake It" (US No. 13; Canada No. 6, 1979)
- "Give Me an Inch" (No. 67, 1979)

Easy Listening (Adult Contemporary)

- "Woodstock – Matthews Southern Comfort (Band)" (No. 17, No. 22 Canada, 1971)
- "Shake It" (No. 21, No. 32 Canada, 1979)
- "Give Me an Inch" (No. 43, 1979)
- "Don't Hang Up Your Dancing Shoes" (No. 42, 1979)
