= I'll Always Call Your Name =

1977 single by Little River Band

- German 7" cover

Single by Little River Band

from the album Little River Band
- B-side: "The Man in Black"
- Released: January 1977
- Recorded: 1975
- Length: 3:35 (single version); 4:48 (album version)
- Label: Harvest / EMI Music
- Songwriter: Beeb Birtles
- Producers: Glenn Wheatley, Little River Band

Little River Band singles chronology
"It's a Long Way There" (1976)	"I'll Always Call Your Name" (1977)	"Help Is on Its Way" (1977)

"I'll Always Call Your Name" is a song by Australian band Little River Band. Originally released as a promotional single, the song was released in January 1977 in North American and limited European countries as the final single from the group's self-titled studio album. The song peaked at number 62 on the US Billboard Hot 100 in February 1977.

== Reception ==
Cash Box magazine said "Even without considering that they are a new group from Australia, the Little River Band logged a fine initial track record with their first single, and this selection from the debut album continues the pop harmonies and creative instrumentals that attracted fans at the beginning. For AM and FM play".

== Track listings ==
North American 7" (4380)
Side A. "I'll Always Call Your Name" - 3:35
Side B. "The Man in Black" - 5:06

German 7" (1C 006-82 345)
Side A. "I'll Always Call Your Name" - 3:35
Side B. "The Man in Black" - 5:06

== Charts ==
Chart (1977)	Peak position
Canada Top Singles (RPM)	76
US Billboard Hot 100	62
