= Terence Boylan (album) =

Studio album by Terence Boylan
- Released: 1977
- Genre: Soft rock
- Label: Asylum
- Producer: Terence Boylan

Terence Boylan chronology
Alias Boona (1969)	Terence Boylan (1977)	Suzy (1980)

Terence Boylan is the second album by the American musician Terence Boylan, released in 1977. He supported it by touring with the Cate Brothers. The album peaked at No. 181 on the Billboard 200.

== Production ==
The album was produced by Boylan, who spent a year recording it; his former classmates Donald Fagen and Walter Becker were originally supposed to produce. He had majored in creative writing, and many of the album's songs are about wanderers and outcasts. His backing band was made up of many session musicians and Los Angeles rock and pop mainstays, including Fagen, Timothy B. Schmit, Jim Gordon, Steve Lukather, Al Kooper, David Paich, Leland Sklar, John Klemmer, Chuck Rainey, and Don Henley, among others. The album cover art is a cropped portion of a Robert Motherwell painting. "Rain King" is about traveling to an African nation that keeps changing its name. "Where Are You Hiding?" touches on the Salem witch trials.

== Critical reception ==
Professional ratings
Review scores
Source	Rating
AllMusic	4/5 stars
The Encyclopedia of Popular Music	3/5 stars
The Journal Herald	A
The New Rolling Stone Record Guide	1/5 stars
Omaha World-Herald	4/5 stars

The New York Times likened Boylan to a "sensitive singer-songwriter" but admired that he "still manages to invest his songs and his singing with a poetic individuality." The Richmond Times-Dispatch noted that "like Jimmy Buffett or Steve Goodman, [Boylan] is a writer of evocative and literate but essentially neutral songs." The Clarion-Ledger concluded that "it may be formula music, but it is certainly an engaging formula." The Chicago Tribune called the album "middle-of-the road" but "wholly winning".

The Independent considered the music of Terence Boylan to be a mixture of Jackson Browne and Steely Dan. The Omaha World-Herald praised Boylan's "warm, personal and grainy voice". The Journal Herald noted the "deceivingly simple laid-back California melodies". The Boston Globe labeled it "almost insultingly bland" soft rock. However, in 1980, the same paper called it "an overlooked gem".

== Track listing ==
Side one

1. "Don't Hang Up Those Dancing Shoes"
2. "Shake It"
3. "Sundown of Fools"
4. The War Was Over"
5. "Shame"

Side two

1. "Hey Papa"
2. "Where Are You Hiding?"
3. "Rain King"
4. "Trains"
