= Diamantina Cocktail =

Studio album by Little River Band
- Released: April 1977; May 1977 (US version)
- Recorded: 1976
- Genre: Rock
- Length: 33:51
- Labels: EMI, Capitol Records (AUS); Harvest Records (USA)
- Producers: John Boylan, Little River Band

Little River Band chronology
After Hours (1976)	Diamantina Cocktail (1977)	Sleeper Catcher (1978)

Singles from Diamantina Cocktail
- 1. "Help Is on Its Way" Released: April 1977; 2. "Witchery" Released: July 1977; 3. "Home on Monday" Released: October 1977; 4. "Happy Anniversary" Released: December 1977

Alternative cover
- Cover of UK version of Diamantina Cocktail

Diamantina Cocktail is the third studio album by the Australian rock group Little River Band, released in April 1977. It peaked at No. 2 on the Australian Kent Music Report Albums Chart and reaching No. 49 on the Billboard 200. A different version was released in the US by Harvest in May 1977. The album was certified Gold in the US by the RIAA in January 1978 for over 500,000 copies sold.

The titled refers to a drink invented in the area of the Diamantina River in Queensland, Australia. It consists of Bundaberg Rum, condensed milk and an emu egg.

== Singles ==
- "Help Is on Its Way" was released as the album's lead single in April 1977. The song peaked at number 1 in Australia and number 14 in the United States.
- "Witchery" was released in Australia and New Zealand in July 1977 as the album's second single. It peaked at number 33 in Australia.
- "Home on Monday" was released in October 1977 as the album's third single. It peaked at number 73 in Australia and number 12 in The Netherlands.
- "Happy Anniversary" was released in December 1977 in Europe and in January 1978 in the United States as the album's fourth and final single. The song peaked at number 16 in the United States.

== Reception ==
Professional ratings
Review scores
Source	Rating
AllMusic	4/5 stars
The Rolling Stone Album Guide	2.5/5 stars

Cash Box said: "Thought the singers in this Aussie band justifiably deserve the spotlight aimed their way, the instrumental setting creates the perfect backdrop for the self-written selection."

== Track listing ==
=== Australian version ===
Side A

1. "Help Is on Its Way" (Glenn Shorrock) – 4:06
2. "The Drifter" (Graham Goble) – 3:53
3. "L.A. in the Sunshine" (David Briggs, Shorrock) – 3:07
4. "The Inner Light" (Goble) – 3:31

Side B

1. "Witchery" (Beeb Birtles, Goble) – 2:48
2. "Home on Monday" (Birtles, Shorrock) – 3:53
3. "Happy Anniversary" (Birtles, Briggs) – 4:04
4. "Raelene, Raelene" (Birtles) – 4:27
5. "Changed and Different" (Goble) – 4:02

Bonus tracks

1. "Days on the Road" (version 2) (Goble) – 5:24 (bonus track on 2010 remaster)
2. "Take Me Home" (version 2) (Birtles) – 5:08 (bonus track on 2010 remaster)

=== US and International version ===
Side A

1. "Help Is on Its Way" (Shorrock) – 4:06
2. "Days on the Road" (Goble) – 4:54
3. "Happy Anniversary" (Birtles, Briggs) – 4:04
4. "Another Runway" (Birtles, Ric Formosa) – 6:33

Side B

1. "Every Day of My Life" (Birtles) – 3:53
2. "Home on Monday" (Birtles, Shorrock) – 3:53
3. "The Inner Light" (Goble) – 3:31
4. "Broke Again" (Birtles, Goble) – 3:27
5. "Take Me Home" (Birtles) – 3:48

== Personnel ==
Little River Band

- Glenn Shorrock – lead vocals, piano
- Graham Goble – guitars, vocals
- Beeb Birtles – guitars, vocals
- David Briggs – guitars
- George McArdle – bass guitar
- Derek Pellicci – drums, percussion
- Ric Formosa – guitar (2, 4, 5 on international version)
- Roger McLachlan – bass (4, 8)

Additional musicians

- Eddy Denton – cor anglais
- Peter Sullivan – piano
- Ian Mason – piano
- Tony Buchanan – saxophones
- Graeme Lyall – flute

== Charts ==
=== Weekly charts ===
Chart (1977)	Peak position
Australia (Kent Music Report)	2
Canada Top Albums/CDs (RPM)	39
Dutch Albums (Album Top 100)	5
New Zealand Albums (RMNZ)	30
US Billboard 200	49

=== Year-end charts ===
Chart (1977)	Position
Australia (Kent Music Report)	6

== Certifications ==
Region	Certification	Certified units/sales
United States (RIAA)	Gold	500,000^{^}
^{^} Shipments figures based on certification alone.
