= Shake It (Iain Matthews song) =

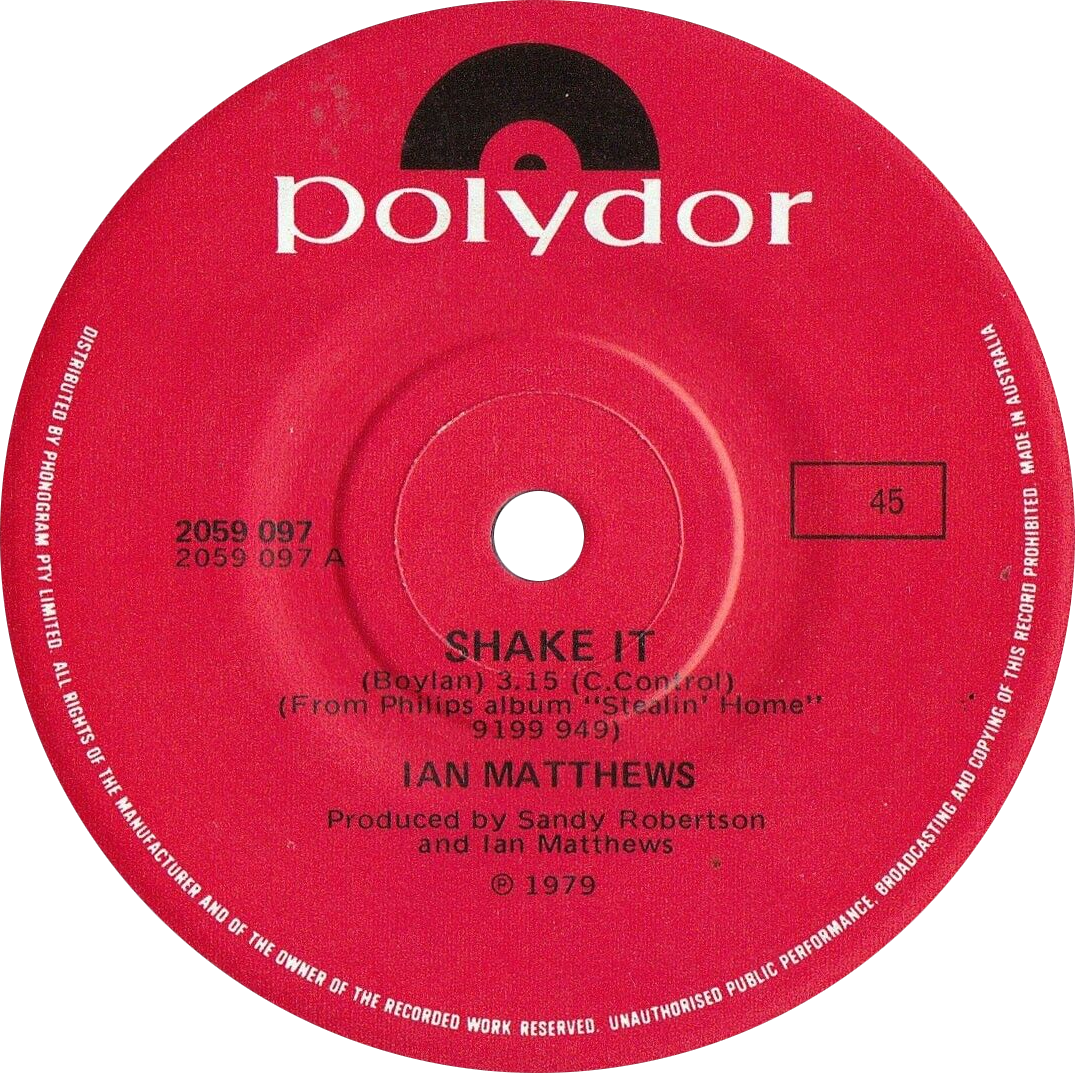
- Side A of the Australian single

Single by Ian Matthews

from the album Stealin' Home
- B-side: "Stealin' Home"
- Released: September 1978
- Recorded: 1978
- Studio: Chipping Norton Recording Studios
- Genre: Soft rock
- Length: 3:10
- Label: Rockburgh/Mushroom
- Songwriter: Terence Boylan
- Producers: Sandy Roberton & Ian Matthews

Ian Matthews singles chronology
"Tigers Will Survive" (1977)	"Shake It" (1978)	"Give Me an Inch" (1978)

"Shake It" was written and recorded by Terence Boylan in 1977. It was covered the following year by Ian Matthews for his album Stealin' Home and became a top 20 hit single in February 1979.

== Background ==
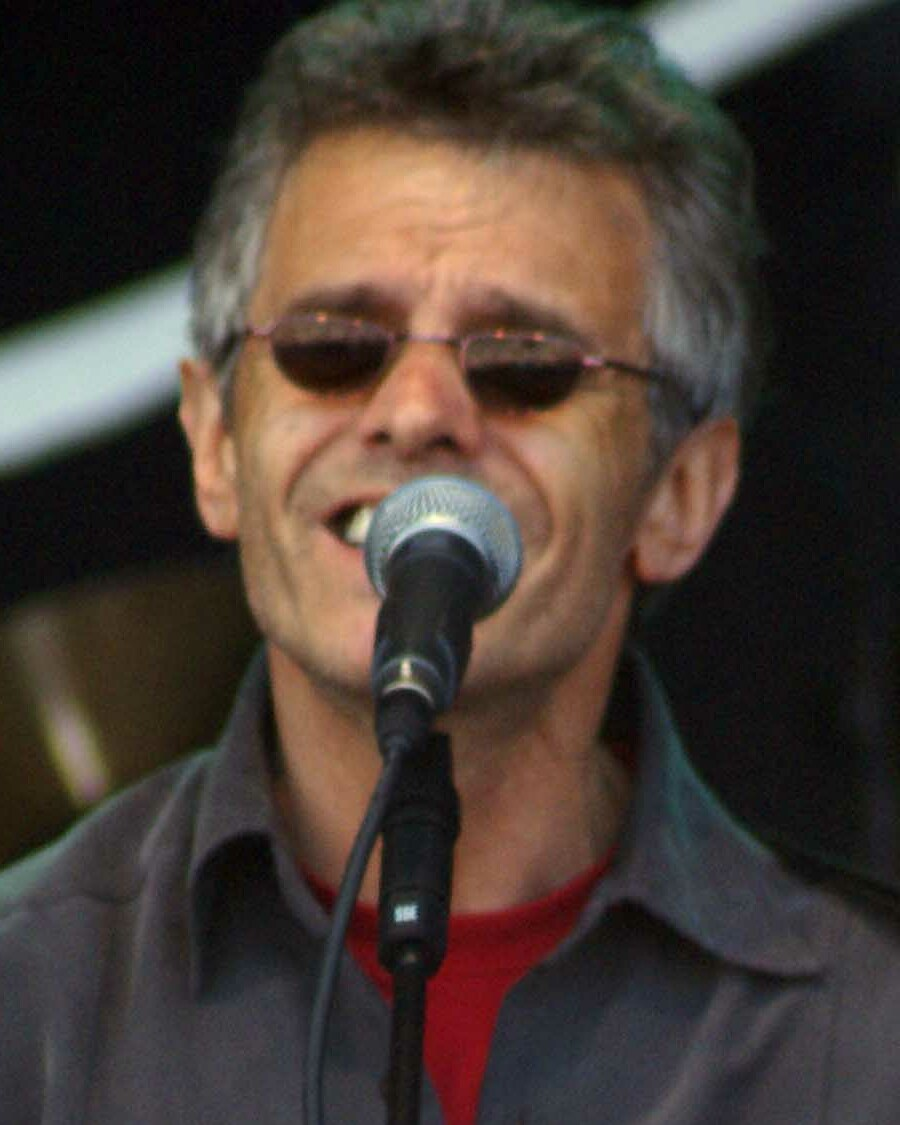
Matthews performing in 2007

"Shake It" was first recorded by its composer Terence Boylan, being introduced on Boylan's 1977 self-titled album on which Timothy B. Schmit – who would join Eagles that same year – sang background on eight of the nine tracks including "Shake It", which track also featured guitarist Al Kooper. Not chosen for US single release, Boylan's "Shake It" was given a 4 November 1977 single release in Ian Matthews's native UK; however, Matthews had been living in the US since 1973, and it was on an FM radio station in Seattle that he first heard Boylan's "Shake It". After Matthews phoned the radio station for info on the track the disc jockey sent him a copy of the Terence Boylan album from which Matthews would "cover" two songs: "Shake It" and "Don't Hang Up Your Dancing Shoes", for his album Stealin' Home recorded in the summer of 1978.

One of two tracks on Stealin' Home to feature Mel Collins on sax, "Shake It" was issued as the album's lead single to become Matthews's first top 40 hit, reaching a Hot 100 peak of #13 within a 19-week Hot 100 tenure. "Shake It" was especially popular in New England, reaching #2 in Springfield, Massachusetts (WAQY) and #3 in Bangor, Maine (WLBZ). The year-end tally for Hot 100 hits of 1979 would rank "Shake It" at #73. "Shake It" would remain Matthews's only top 40 hit as a solo act: the second single from the Stealin' Home album, the Robert Palmer composition "Give Me an Inch", peaked at #67 as Matthews's final Hot 100 entry. (The Boylan composition "Don't Hang Up Your Dancing Shoes", the third single release off Stealin' Home afforded Matthews his final appearance on a Billboard chart, peaking at #42 on the magazine's Easy Listening hit ranking, where "Shake It" had reached #21 and "Give Me an Inch" #43.)

Concurrent with the single's top 40 success, Ian Matthews would tell Rolling Stone: "I don’t think I did anything different [to record a hit single]. I guess it's my reward. After all, I've been doing exactly what I want for 14 or 15 years." However, Matthews would later acknowledge that on the single's parent album: Stealin' Home, "I tried to add just a couple of songs that had Top 40 potential, without compromising the rest of the material [and the album] did precisely what it was supposed to do: it raised my profile, without lowering my credibility." (Matthews, who had reached #23 on the Hot 100 in 1972 fronting the Matthews Southern Comfort single "Woodstock", had as a solo act had one prior Hot 100 entry with "Da Doo Ron Ron" also in 1972.) Also Matthews would give credit for the success of "Shake It" to Mushroom Records, who picked up the Stealin' Home album for U.S. and Canadian release: (Ian Matthews quote) "I've had potential hit singles on [earlier] albums...but there's never been the enthusiasm I've had from this record company. It [gave] me a hit single."

Although "Woodstock" had afforded Matthews' Southern Comfort a three-week tenure at #1 in the UK in 1970, Matthews would never appear on the UK chart as a solo act despite a string of UK single releases, including "Shake It" released in February 1979 after three previous tracks off Stealin' Home had failed as singles. "Shake It" would afford Matthews a top ten hit in Canada, peaking at #6: the track had been especially popular in New Brunswick, reaching #1 on CIHI in Fredericton. "Shake It" would also become a top 20 hit in New Zealand, and would chart in Australia with a #65 peak.

Sales of 800,000 units were cited for Matthews's "Shake It" single in May 1979.

== Use in media ==
"Shake It" is heard at the beginning of the 1980 film Little Darlings: (Ian Matthews quote) "The first I knew about the song being in the movie was when it came out and a friend called to ask if I’d heard it." The song can also be heard on the radio in the game The Warriors from Rockstar Games.

== Chart performance ==
=== Weekly charts ===
Chart (1978–1979)	Peak position
Australia (Kent Music Report)	65
Canadian RPM Top Singles	6
Canadian Adult Contemporary	32
New Zealand	17
US Billboard Hot 100	13
US Billboard Easy Listening	21
US Cashbox Top 100	10
US Record World	11

=== Year-end charts ===
Chart (1979)	Rank
Canada RPM Top Singles	68
US Billboard Hot 100	73
US Cash Box Top 100	77
