= Journeys from Gospel Oak =

Journeys From Gospel Oak

Studio album by Ian Matthews
- Released: 1974
- Recorded: November 1972
- Studio: Sound Techniques
- Genre: Country rock
- Label: Mooncrest
- Producer: Sandy Roberton

Ian Matthews chronology
Valley Hi (1973)	Journeys From Gospel Oak (1974)	Some Days You Eat The Bear (1974)

Professional ratings
Review scores
Source	Rating
AllMusic	4.5/5 stars

Journeys from Gospel Oak is the 1974 solo album by country rock/folk rock musician Ian Matthews. It was recorded in November 1972 as Matthews' expected third solo album of a three-album record deal on the Vertigo label and was originally set for release in mid-1973. Vertigo, however, lost interest in the project and it was signed over to and released by Mooncrest Records in 1974 who had also released albums by other ex-Fairport Convention colleagues, Ashley Hutchings and Sandy Denny. The album was recorded at Sound Techniques studio in Chelsea and took its title from Matthews' commute to the studio from where he then lived in North London.

The album was first released on CD in 1988 by Line Records in Germany, and then again by Mooncrest in 1991 with new liner notes by John Tobler. An expanded version of the album, featuring seven extra tracks, was released by the Sanctuary Records Group in 2006 on the Castle Music label.

== Track listing ==
1. "Knowing The Game" (Ian Matthews) - 2:34
2. "Polly" (Gene Clark) - 4:02
3. "Things You Gave Me" (Glen D. Hardin) - 2:32
4. "Mobile Blue" (Mickey Newbury) - 3:27
5. "Tribute To Hank Williams" (Tim Hardin) - 2:57
6. "Met Her On A Plane" (Jimmy Webb) - 3:33
7. "Bride 1945" (Paul Siebel) - 3:07
8. "Franklin Avenue" (Ian Matthews) - 2:51
9. "Do Right Woman" (Dan Penn, Chips Moman) - 3:35
10. "Sing Me Back Home" (Merle Haggard) - 3:36

Extra tracks (2006 Expanded Version)

1. "Met Her On A Plane" (7" single mix)
2. "Devil In Disguise" (album outtake)
3. "Knowing The Game" (2006 re-recording)
4. "Polly" (2006 re-recording)
5. "Franklin Avenue" (2006 re-recording)
6. "Tribute To Hank Williams" (2006 re-recording)
7. "Devil In Disguise" (2006 re-recording)

== Personnel ==
- Ian Matthews - guitar, vocals
- Jerry Donahue - guitar
- Andy Roberts - acoustic guitar
- Pat Donaldson - bass
- Timi Donald - drums

== Production ==
- Producer: Sandy Roberton
- Recording Engineer: Jerry Boys
- Art Director: Frank Sansom
- Artwork: Product Promotion
- Liner notes: John Tobler
