= Give Me an Inch =

1976 single by Robert Palmer

Single by Robert Palmer

from the album Pressure Drop
- B-side: "Pressure Drop"
- Released: 30 January 1976
- Length: 3:17
- Label: Island
- Songwriter: Robert Palmer
- Producer: Steve Smith

Robert Palmer singles chronology
"Which of Us is the Fool" (1975)	"Give Me an Inch" (1976)	"Man Smart, Woman Smarter" (1976)

Audio video
- "Give Me an Inch" on YouTube

"Give Me an Inch" (or "Give Me an Inch Girl" on some releases) is a song by English singer Robert Palmer, which was released in 1976 as the second single from his second studio album Pressure Drop (1975). The song was written by Palmer and produced by Steve Smith. "Give Me an Inch" reached No. 6 on the US Billboard Bubbling Under the Hot 100 chart and No. 88 on the Cash Box Top 100 Singles chart.

== Critical reception ==
Upon release, Cash Box commented: "Fine, fine lyrics and a boiling production full of soaring strings, steady drums and sultry bass, flutes in the background. Palmer's voice personifies the storyline which intimates that he's ready for the love that's finally crossed his path." In a review of Pressure Drop, Billboard listed the song as one of the album's "best cuts". In a retrospective review of the album, David Jeffries of AllMusic commented: "...the soft songs are well written and convincing, especially the opening "Give Me an Inch"."

== Track listing ==
7" single

1. "Give Me an Inch" – 3:17
2. "Pressure Drop" – 5:28

== Charts ==
Chart (1976)	Peak position
US Billboard Bubbling Under the Hot 100	6
US Cash Box Top 100 Singles	88

== Ian Matthews version ==
"Give Me an Inch"

Single by Ian Matthews

from the album Stealin' Home
- B-side: "Man in the Station"
- Released: 2 February 1979
- Recorded: 1978
- Studio: Chipping Norton Recording Studios
- Genre: Soft rock
- Length: 4:19 (album version); 3:32 (single version)
- Label: Rockburgh/Mushroom
- Songwriter: Robert Palmer
- Producers: Sandy Robertson; Ian Matthews

Ian Matthews singles chronology
"Shake It" (1978)	"Give Me an Inch" (1979)	"Don't Hang Up Your Dancing Shoes" (1978)

In 1978, English singer-songwriter Iain Matthews recorded "Give Me an Inch" for his ninth studio album Stealin' Home. Matthews told The Huffington Post in 2014, "I was a peripheral Robert [Palmer] fan. I knew him when I lived in England and had followed his musical development. I heard the song and wanted to interpret it." Reviewing Stealin' Home for Rolling Stone's syndicated record review column, Stephen Holden assessed Matthews' version as "more compelling" than the original preferring "Matthews' rock treatment [with its] eschewing [of] the pretentious string arrangements that mar much of Palmer's music." Released as the followup single to the Top 20 hit "Shake It", "Give Me an Inch" afforded Matthews a final Billboard Hot 100 entry, peaking at No. 67 in April 1979.
