= Ride the Times =

Ride The Times

Studio album by Iain Matthews & Ad Vanderveen
- Released: 2010
- Recorded: August to December 2009
- Genre: Folk rock, Jazz, Country music
- Language: English
- Label: Turtle Records

Ride The Times is the second album by "The Iain Ad Venture" (Iain Matthews & Ad Vanderveen), released on Turtle Records on May 14, 2010. The album is one of four on which Matthews and Vanderveen have recorded together and is a sequel to the original Iain Ad Venture live album recorded at the Cafe de Amer in Amen and released in 2000 (the other two albums being their More Than A Song and Witness collaborations with Eliza Gilkyson). The album features various duet performances between Matthews and Vanderveen in the Singer-Songwriter/Americana genre. It has 14 songs, some covers, others brand new. Most songs feature harmonies with the use of acoustic guitar. The album also features Dutch singer Kersten de Ligny on background vocals on its final track.

On May 14, 2010, the Iain Ad Venture presented their new album at Rhapsody High End Audio store at the Borneolaan in Hilversum.

== Songs ==
#	Song
1	Mohammed’s Radio (Warren Zevon)
2	Action (Iain Matthews)
3	Time So Green (Ad Vanderveen)
4	Things (Bobby Darin)
5	Ride The Times (Ad Vanderveen)
6	Sorrow (Iain Matthews)
7	Mr. Soul (Neil Young)
8	Unravel (Lynn Miles)
9	Love Is A Secret (Ad Vanderveen)
10	Him Who Saved Me (Chip Taylor)
11	The Moment That Matters (Ad Vanderveen)
12	Heart Of Saturday Night (Tom Waits)
13	Blossom (Iain Matthews, Pete Droge & Rasmus Hedeboe)
14	Carry Me Back (Ad Vanderveen)
