= Joel Tepp =

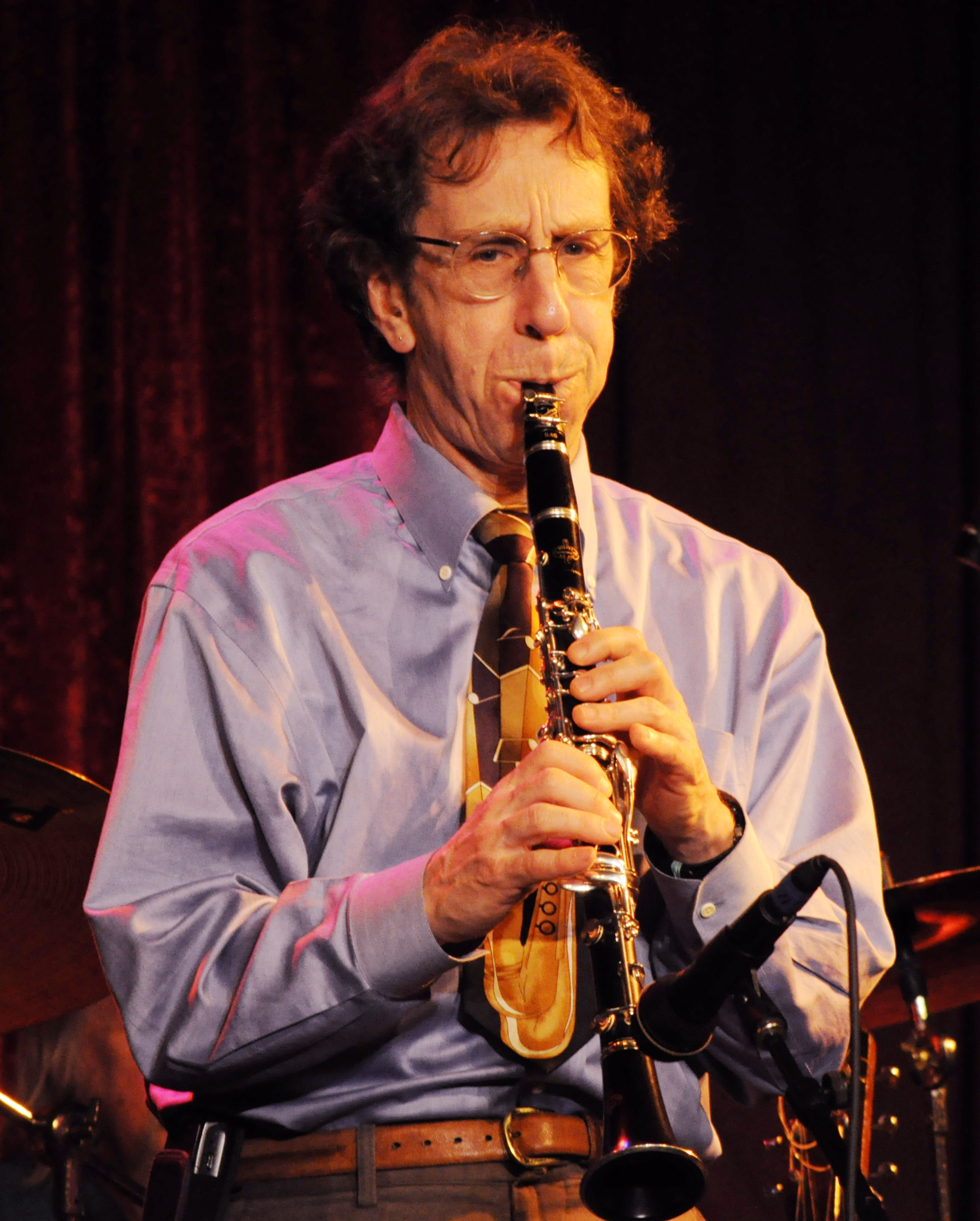
Joel Tepp, 2011

Joel Tepp is an American multi-instrumentalist (guitar, harmonica, clarinet) with a 40-year history in live and recorded music. He was born in 1948. He majored in criminology at UC Berkeley, where he was a gymnast, a gold medalist on the pommel horse and a member of the 1968 NCAA national championship team along with Dan Millman (Way of the Peaceful Warrior). He then completed another round of studies in music at UCLA.

His performance beginnings were in American Roots music where Tepp learned his trade directly from masters such as Johnny Shines, Bukka White, Earl Hooker, John Lee Hooker, Sippie Wallace, Magic Sam and Shakey Jake Harris. His first instrumental acclaim came on harmonica and clarinet. Working out of Los Angeles, he transitioned to folk, rock and songwriter-based music in the mid-1970s, performing or recording with Bonnie Raitt, Leslie West, Iain Matthews, Danny O'Keefe, Spencer Davis Wendy Waldman and others. At this same time, Joel's slide guitar work began to attract attention as well. While certainly facile in traditional blues and rock styles on that instrument, he has gradually developed a signature sound that includes elements of pedal steel and other various unusual harmonics and voicings.

Other activities in the Los Angeles music scene included his stint as the MC at The Troubadour for the legendary Monday night talent showcases. In conjunction with his partner Matt Kramer, the two introduced or previewed many artists who have become mainstays in the music world including Tom Waits, Rikki Lee Jones, Karla Bonoff, Billy Vera and Gail Davies, among many others.

Today, Joel resides in Seattle and is a familiar face as a multi-instrument accompanist at Northwest concerts, in California, Kerrville and elsewhere. He still regularly adds his slide guitar, harmonica and clarinet playing to the music of Bonnie Raitt, Little Feat, Danny O'Keefe, Caroline Aiken and many others. His recording credits include Jerry Garcia, Crazy Horse, John David Souther, Kate & Anna McGarrigle, several major films, television shows and much more. His slide guitar workshops and classes on the Art of Accompaniment are often parts of various music festivals, particularly on the West Coast.

In addition to his work as a musician, Joel Tepp is a financial advisor and father of Rhea Tepp, an experimental artist/musician who performs in the project Lilacs and is co-founder of L.A. Zine Fest and free form radio station Only For the Open Minded.

== Discography ==
- Karen Alexander : Isn't It Always Love (1975)
- Caroline Aiken : Are We There Yet, Mama? (2005)
- Bear Family Records : 30th Anniversary (2005)
- Marc Bristol : Sweet Misery Moan (1994)
- Marc Bristol : The Best of Marc Bristol - Country, Vol 1 (2002)
- Marc Bristol : On the Edge of Romance: The Best of Mark Bristol (2003)
- Buffalo Nickel Jug Band : The Buffalo Nickel Jug Band (1972)
- Crazy Horse : Loose (1971)
- Dynamic Logs : The Vinyl Reunion (1985)
- File Gumbo Zydeco Band : Mardi Gras in New Orleans (1998)
- Jerry Garcia : Garcia (Compliments of Garcia) ( 1974)
- Denny Hall : All Good Things...Studio Sessions (2004)
- Denny Hall : The Nite Cafe (2006)
- John Hall : John Hall (1978)
- Linda Ronstadt - Live @ McCabes 1974
- Little Feat - Live From O'Mahony's (2005)
- Little Feat : Live From Neon Park (1996)
- Little Feat : Hotcakes and Outtakes (2000)
- Jelly w/Amy Madigan : A True Story (1977)
- Ian Matthews : Some Days You Eat the Bear, Some Days the Bear Eats You (1974)
- Ian Matthews : Go For Broke (1975)
- Ian Matthews : Siamese Friends (1979)
- Iain Matthews : Orphans & Outcasts vol 1 (1993)
- Iain Matthews : Seattle Years 1978-1984 (1996)
- Kate & Anna McGarrigle : Kate & Anna McGarrigle (1976)
- Kate & Anna McGarrigle : Entre Lajeunesse et la sagesse (French Record) (1980)
- Danny O'Keefe : The Global Blues (1979)
- Danny O'Keefe : Runnin' from the Devil (2000)
- Danny O'Keefe : KEZX Album Project 2 (1986)
- Danny O'Keefe : Classics (2004)
- Danny O'Keefe : The Hereafter/Songs For Shelter (2005)
- The Olson Brothers : River in the Rain (1992)
- Jim Page : Human Interesting (2003)
- Bonnie Raitt : Live from the Record Plant 9–12–1973
- Ginny Reilly : Oh, Reilly! (1986)
- j.r. richards
- The Sibling Bros : AfriQueen Stare (2003)
- Washington : Washington (1989)
- John David Souther : John David Souther (1972)
- Jim Sullins : Inside Thunder Outside Laughing (1974)
- Rod Taylor : Rod Taylor (1973)
- Kim Townsend: Wayworn Traveler (2003)
- Wendy Waldman : Sail Away (2006)
- Gypsy Symphony (1974)
- Leslie West : The Great Fatsby (1975)
- Leslie West : Blood of the Sun: 1969-1975 (1996)
- Cris Williamson : Prairie Fire (1985)
- Cris Williamson : Best of Chris Williamson (1990)

== Films ==
- Walking Tall Part 1
- Walking Tall Part II
- Goldy, Last of the Golden Bears
- Paint Your Wagon
- Great Texas Dynamite Chase
- White Line Fever
- Jessie's Girls''
