= It's a Long Way There =

1976 single by Little River Band

- Dutch 7" picture sleeve

Single by Little River Band

from the album Little River Band
- B-side: "Time to Fly" / "Meanwhile"
- Released: August 1976
- Recorded: 1975
- Genre: Soft rock
- Length: 4:16 (single version); 8:39 (album version)
- Label: EMI Music / Harvest
- Songwriter: Graham Goble
- Producers: Glenn Wheatley, Little River Band

Little River Band singles chronology
"Everyday of My Life" (1976)	"It's a Long Way There" (1976)	"I'll Always Call Your Name" (1977)

"It's a Long Way There" is a song by Australian band Little River Band, released in August 1976 as the band's debut international single and in October 1976 as the third single from the group's self-titled studio album. The song peaked at number 35 on the Australian Kent Music Report singles chart, and peaked at #28 on the Billboard Hot 100 chart, becoming the band's first top 40 hit in the United States.

Written by Graeham Goble in 1972, the song was inspired by his regular trips from Melbourne to visit his family in Adelaide. The song was initially performed by Goble's earlier band Mississippi, which included three subsequent members of Little River band: Goble, Beeb Birtles and Derek Pellicci. Ric Formosa played lead guitar, Glenn Shorrock sang lead vocals, with Goble and Birtles providing harmonies.

== Reception ==
Cash Box magazine said "A haunting string introduction gives way to some funky rock and roll in this fully realised single from the Little River Band. A trifle long for AM play, this should definitely break through on the progressive FM side. The harmonies are deep and rich."

Billboard (magazine) said "There's a Crosby, Stills, Nash & Young feel as it shifts from a symphonic, airy opening to guitar-dominated mid-rock base. Carefully honed folk rock vocals throughout."

Writing in Something Else, S.Victor Aaron said that more often than not, they ended up sounding like Crosby, Stills & Nash. "It wasn’t the match of Crosby, Stills & Nash at their best, but darn close enough. In fact, "It’s a Long Way There" might be the best CSN song that CSN never did."

== Track listings ==
Australian 7" (EMI 11292)
Side A. "It's a Long Way There" - 4:16
Side B. "Time to Fly" - 3:00

US 7" (Harvest 4318)
Side A. "It's a Long Way There" - 4:16
Side B. "Meanwhile" - 3:53

== Charts ==
Chart (1976/77)	Peak position
Australia (Kent Music Report)	35
Canada Top Singles (RPM)	72
New Zealand (Recorded Music NZ)	32
Netherlands (Single Top 100)	14
US Billboard Hot 100	28
