= Witchery (song) =

1977 single by Little River Band

Single by Little River Band

from the album Diamantina Cocktail
- B-side: "L.A. in the Sunshine"
- Released: July 1977
- Recorded: 1976
- Length: 3:07
- Label: EMI Music
- Songwriters: Graham Goble, Beeb Birtles
- Producer: Little River Band

Little River Band singles chronology
"Help Is on Its Way" (1977)	"Witchery" (1977)	"Home on Monday" (1977)

"Witchery" is a song by Australian band Little River Band, released in July 1977 as the second single from the group's third studio album, Diamantina Cocktail. The song peaked at number 33 on the Australian Kent Music Report singles chart. In the US, it appeared on the 1980 After Hours album.

The song was originally written as a jingle for the 'Witchery Fun Fashion Boutiques' chain. On a 1975 compilation album promoting the brand, Witchery Spellbinders, the song 'Witchery' is listed, uncredited, on the sleeve but credited to 'The Spellbinders' on the label, with Beeb Birtles as songwriter. Little River Band's 'Curiosity Killed the Cat' also appears on the LP, properly attributed to Little River Band.

== Track listing ==
Australian 7" (EMI 11491)
Side A. "Witchery" - 3:07
Side B. "L.A. in the Sunshine" - 3:00

== Charts ==
Chart (1977)	Peak position
Australia (Kent Music Report)	33
