= Little River Band (album) =

- Australian cover art

Studio album by Little River Band
- Released: November 1975; September 1976 (US)
- Studio: Armstrong Studios, Melbourne
- Genre: Rock
- Length: 45:07
- Label: EMI, Harvest
- Producer: Glenn Wheatley, Little River Band

Little River Band chronology
| Little River Band (1975) | After Hours (1976) |

Alternative cover
- North American cover art (1976)

Singles from Little River Band
- 1. "Curiosity (Killed the Cat)" Released: September 1975; 2. "Emma" Released: December 1975; 3. "It's a Long Way There" Released: August 1976; 4. "I'll Always Call Your Name" Released: January 1977 (North America only)

Professional ratings
Review scores
| Source | Rating |
|---|---|
| Allmusic | 3/5 stars |

Little River Band is the debut studio album by the Australian rock group Little River Band which was released by EMI in November 1975. It peaked at No. 17 on the Australian Kent Music Report Albums Chart and was certified 2× gold in Australia in November 1976. It was released in the US by Harvest in September 1976.

== Singles ==
The band's first single, "Curiosity (Killed the Cat)", was released in September 1975, ahead of the album and peaked at No. 15 on the Kent Music Report Singles Chart. The following single, "Emma" was released in December 1975 and peaked at No. 20.

In August 1976, an edited version of "It's a Long Way There" was released as the band lead single international and the third single in Australia. It reached the Australian Top 40 and became the band's first US Top 40 hit. It also charted in Netherlands to reach No. 14.

"I'll Always Call Your Name" was released in early 1977 in North America only as the album's fourth and final single.

== Track listing ==
All tracks are written by Little River Band members as shown.

Side A
| No. | Title | Writer(s) | Length |
|---|---|---|---|
| 1. | "It's a Long Way There" | Graham Goble | 8:39 |
| 2. | "Curiosity (Killed the Cat)" | Beeb Birtles | 3:40 |
| 3. | "Meanwhile ..." | Glenn Shorrock | 3:35 |
| 4. | "My Lady and Me" | Goble | 5:45 |

Side B
| No. | Title | Writer(s) | Length |
|---|---|---|---|
| 1. | "I'll Always Call Your Name" | Birtles | 4:48 |
| 2. | "Emma" | Shorrock | 3:35 |
| 3. | "The Man in Black" | Shorrock | 5:06 |
| 4. | "Statue of Liberty" | Shorrock | 3:28 |
| 5. | "I Know It" | Goble | 3:21 |

1996 CD Reissue
| No. | Title | Writer(s) | Length |
|---|---|---|---|
| 10. | "Please Don't Ask Me" | Goble | 3:18 |

2010 Digital Remaster
| No. | Title | Writer(s) | Length |
|---|---|---|---|
| 10. | "I Just Don't Get the Feeling Anymore" | Goble | 4:52 |
| 11. | "Love Is a Feeling" | Birtles | 4:50 |
| 12. | "Time to Fly" | Birtles | 2:57 |

== Personnel ==
Little River Band members

- Beeb Birtles – lead vocals, backing vocals, guitars (acoustic, electric)
- Ric Formosa – guitars (lead, acoustic, slide)
- Graham Goble – lead vocals, backing vocals, guitars (acoustic, electric), vocal arrangements
- Roger McLachlan – bass guitar
- Derek Pellicci – drums, percussion
- Glenn Shorrock – lead vocals, backing vocals, percussion, harmonica

Additional musicians

- Stephen Cooney – clavinet (track 2), mandolin (track 9)
- Gary Hyde – percussion
- Peter Jones – strings (arrangement, conductor), piano (tracks 1–5, 7–9)
- Col Loughnan – saxophone (track 8)
- Ian Mason – piano (track 6)

Production details

- Engineering – Ross Cockle (recording and remix), Mark Opitz (mastering)
- Producer – Birtles, Shorrock, Glenn Wheatley, Goble
- Design – Art Sims

== Charts ==
| Chart (1975/76) | Peak position |
|---|---|
| Australia (Kent Music Report) | 12 |
| US Billboard 200 | 80 |

== Certifications ==
| Region | Certification | Certified units/sales |
|---|---|---|
| Australia (ARIA) | 2× Gold | 40,000^{^} |
^{^} Shipments figures based on certification alone.
