= Home on Monday =

1977 single by Little River Band

- Dutch picture sleeve

Single by Little River Band

from the album Diamantina Cocktail
- B-side: "Raelene, Raelene" "The Inner Light"
- Released: September 1977
- Recorded: 1976
- Length: 3:47 (single version); 3:51 (album version)
- Label: EMI
- Songwriters: Glenn Shorrock, Beeb Birtles
- Producer: Little River Band

Little River Band singles chronology
"Witchery" (1977)	"Home on Monday" (1977)	"Happy Anniversary" (1977)

"Home on Monday" (a.k.a. "Home on a Monday") is a song by Australian band Little River Band, released in September 1977 as the third single from the group's third studio album, Diamantina Cocktail. The song peaked at number 73 on the Australian Kent Music Report singles chart and at number 12 on the Dutch Single Top 100.

The "Las Vegas Hilton" in the song is now called the Westgate Las Vegas.

== Track listing ==
Australian 7" (EMI 11522)
Side A. "Home on Monday" - 3:40
Side B. "Raelene, Raelene" - 4:27

Dutch 7" (EMI 5C 006-82401)
Side A. "Home on Monday" - 3:47
Side B. "The Inner Light" - 3:25

== Charts ==
Chart (1977)	Peak position
Australia (Kent Music Report)	73
Netherlands (Single Top 100)	12
