= Ian Clayton =

English writer and broadcaster

Ian Clayton (born 4 September 1959 in Featherstone, Yorkshire) is an English writer and broadcaster. In a freelance career spanning 20 years he has edited and authored more than forty books and broadcast on TV and radio. He has run education workshops from infant schools to universities, working regularly with musicians on opera and music theatre projects. He has worked across Europe as well as China and the United States.

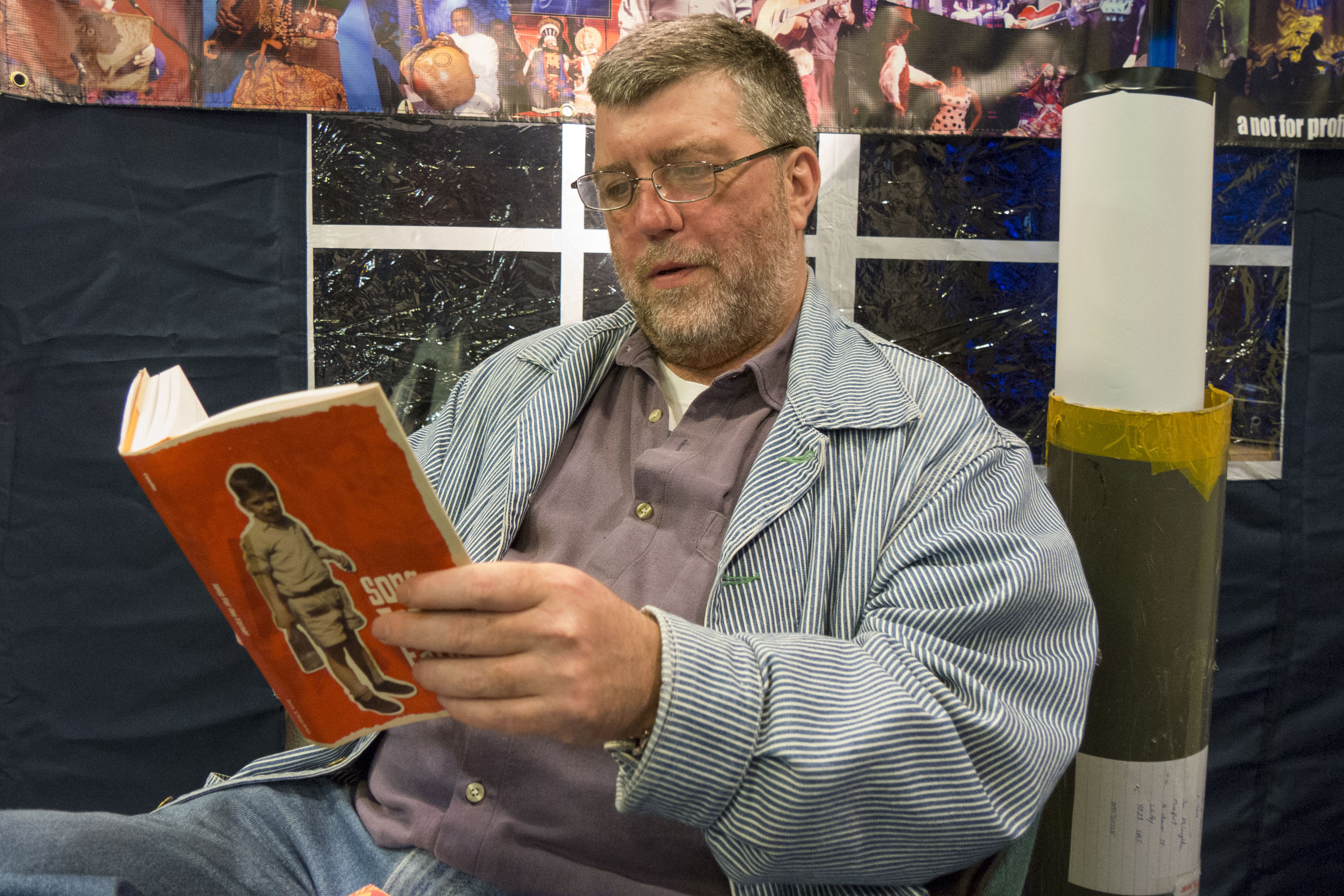
Clayton in 2014

== Current work ==
Clayton worked with Yorkshire Art Circus for twenty-five years and presented a documentary series for Yorkshire Television called My Yorkshire. He is a regular radio broadcaster and workshop leader for numerous cultural institutions.

== Canoeing incident ==
In April, 2006 Clayton's nine-year-old daughter Billie died in a canoeing accident in Powys, Wales in which her father and twin brother Edward survived. Following an inquest into her death in 2008 – which recorded a verdict of misadventure – Clayton criticised the canoe hire industry and called for it to be more strictly regulated.

== Selected books ==
- Right Up Your Street: The Express Columns Volume One (Route Publishing, 2015, ISBN 978-1-901927-63-4)
- Wisdom of our Own: Living and Learning Since the Miners' Strike (CCLC, 2015)
- Song for My Father (Route Publishing, 2014 (Paperback) ISBN 978-1-901927-62-7 (Hardback) privately published)
- Bringing It All Back Home (Route Publishing, 2007 (Hardback) ISBN 978-1-901927-33-7 (Paperback) ISBN 978-1-901927-35-1)
- Entertaining Angels (Saint George's Church & Crypt, 2002 ISBN 0-9534464-1-7)
- What the Eck Is That Over There? (Yorkshire Art Circus, 1996 ISBN 1-898311-27-7)
- When Push Comes To Shove Volume 2 – Centenary Edition (Yorkshire Art Circus, 1995, ISBN 1-898311-14-5)
- When Push Comes To Shove (Yorkshire Art Circus, 1993, ISBN 0-947780-98-X) – The Sunday Times Sports Book of the Year
- Running For Clocks and Dessert Spoons (Yorkshire Art Circus, 1988, ISBN 0-947780-32-7)

== Visiting Scholar ==
In 2013 and 2015, Ian Clayton was visiting scholar in creative writing at North East Normal University in Changchun, China, where he was invited to give the Masters Lecture at the media school, and was a guest lecturer at Jilin University.

== Selected projects as writing workshop leader. ==
- Academy of St Martin in the Fields.
- Opera North.
- London Sinfonietta.
- English National Opera at Sky TV.
- Royal Festival Hall.
- Benjamin Britton School of Advanced Music Study.
- National Youth Orchestra Summer School.

== Television ==
- With a little Help from our Friends – UNESCO prize nominee.
- Wakefield Jailhouse Opera.
- My Yorkshire – Yorkshire TV.

== Radio ==
- Still angry after all these years – BBC Radio 4

== Film ==
- Prometheus – Dir. Tony Harrison.
