= Emma (Little River Band song) =

1975 single by Little River Band

Single by Little River Band

from the album Little River Band
- B-side: "Love Is a Feeling"
- Released: December 1975
- Recorded: 1975
- Length: 3:40
- Label: EMI
- Songwriter(s): Glenn Shorrock
- Producer(s): Glenn Wheatley, Little River Band

Little River Band singles chronology
| "Curiosity (Killed the Cat)" (1975) | "Emma" (1975) | "Everyday of My Life" (1976) |

"Emma" is a song by Australian band Little River Band, released in December 1975 as the second single from their self-titled debut studio album. The song peaked at number 20 on the Australian Kent Music Report singles chart.

== Track listing ==
7" (EMI 11003)
Side A. "Emma" - 3:19
Side B. "Love Is a Feeling" - 4:40

== Charts ==
| Chart (1976) | Peak position |
|---|---|
| Australia (Kent Music Report) | 20 |
