= Everyday of My Life =

1976 single by Little River Band

Single by Little River Band

from the album After Hours
- B-side: "Days On the Road"
- Released: April 1976
- Length: 3:45
- Label: EMI Music
- Songwriter(s): Beeb Birtles
- Producer(s): Little River Band

Little River Band singles chronology
"Emma" (1975)	"Everyday of My Life" (1976)	"It's a Long Way There" (1976)

"Everyday of My Life" is a song by Australian band Little River Band, released in April 1976 as the first and only single from the group's second studio album, After Hours. The song peaked at number 29 on the Australian Kent Music Report singles chart.

== Track listings ==
7" (EMI 11116)
Side A. "Everyday of My Life" - 3:40
Side B. "Days On the Road" - 3:45

== Charts ==
Chart (1976)	Peak position
Australia (Kent Music Report)	29
