= Caroline Aiken =

American singer-songwriter

Caroline Aiken (born August 8, 1955) is a singer and guitarist from Atlanta, Georgia whose work spans genres, from folk to blues to rock. Aiken has released nine albums and performed with Bonnie Raitt and the Indigo Girls.

Caroline currently resides in Athens, GA and also teaches workshops on songwriting and performing.

== External resources ==
- Official website
