= Curiosity (Killed the Cat) =

1975 single by Little River Band

Single by Little River Band

from the album Little River Band
- B-side: "I Just Don't Get the Feeling Anymore"
- Released: September 1975
- Recorded: 1975
- Length: 3:40
- Label: EMI Music
- Songwriter(s): Beeb Birtles
- Producer(s): Glenn Wheatley, Little River Band

Little River Band singles chronology
"Curiosity (Killed the Cat)" (1975)	"Emma" (1976)

"Curiosity (Killed the Cat)" is the debut single by Australian band Little River Band, released in September 1975 from their self-titled debut studio album. The song peaked at number 15 on the Australian Kent Music Report singles chart.

The song was written by Beeb Birtles. In July 2003, he told Debbie Kruger of Melbourne Weekly Magazine, "I wrote "Curiosity (Killed the Cat)" in London in 1974 when I was in the band Mississippi. Graeham Goble's wife had been given a kitten, which I would see running around the house we shared, and the idea for "Curiosity (Killed the Cat)" came to me. The lyrics in the song pertain more to me being the crazy cat and my girlfriend at the time being the one to keep me on an even keel. It's a song about hope and hanging on to your dreams no matter what!"

== Track listing ==
7" (EMI 10900)
Side A. "Curiosity (Killed the Cat)" - 3:40
Side B. "I Just Don't Get the Feeling Anymore" - 4:55

== Charts ==
=== Weekly charts ===
Chart (1975)	Peak position
Australia (Kent Music Report)	15

=== Year-end charts ===
Chart (1975)	Peak position
Australia (Kent Music Report)	85
