= After Hours (Little River Band album) =

Studio album by Little River Band
- Released: April 1976; October 1980 (US)
- Genre: Rock
- Length: 44:13 (iTunes 2010 re-release)
- Label: EMI Records
- Producer: Little River Band

Little River Band chronology
Little River Band (1975)	After Hours (1976)	Diamantina Cocktail (1977)

Singles from After Hours
- 1. "Everyday of My Life" Released: April 1976

After Hours is the second studio album from the Australian rock band Little River Band, released in April 1976. It peaked at No. 5 on the Australian Kent Music Report Albums Chart.

Lead singer Glenn Shorrock names this album as his favourite album by the band.

The album was released in the US in October 1980.

In between the recording of After Hours and Diamantina Cocktail, two founding members of the band departed: Ric Formosa (lead guitar) and Roger McLachlan (bass).

== Reception ==
Professional ratings
Review scores
Source	Rating
Allmusic	2/5 stars

The Allmusic rating for After Hours is for the 1980 US version that is a compilation of leftovers from the Australian albums following the international release of Diamantina Cocktail.

== Track listing ==
=== Australian and European version ===
Side A

1. "Days on the Road" (G. Goble) – 5:20
2. "Everyday of My Life" (B. Birtles) – 3:45
3. "Broke Again" (B. Birtles/G. Goble) – 3:25
4. "Seine City" (G. Shorrock) – 3:43
5. "Another Runway" (B. Birtles/R. Formosa) – 6:28

Side B

1. "Bourbon Street" (R. Formosa) – 4:22
2. "Sweet Old Fashioned Man" (G. Shorrock) – 4:34
3. "Take Me Home" (B. Birtles) – 5:09
4. "Country Girls" (G. Goble) – 7:11

=== US version ===
1. "Seine City" (G. Shorrock) – 3:46
2. "Bourbon Street" (R. Formosa) – 4:22
3. "Sweet Old Fashioned Man" (G. Shorrock) – 4:38
4. "Country Girls" (G. Goble) – 7:13
5. "The Drifter" (G. Goble) – 3:53
6. "L.A. in the Sunshine" (D. Briggs/G. Shorrock) – 3:07
7. "Witchery" (B. Birtles) – 2:48
8. "Raelene Raelene" (B. Birtles) – 4:27
9. "Changed and Different" (G. Goble) – 4:02
10. "The Butterfly" (live) (traditional) – 2:41*
11. "Days on the Road" (live) (G. Goble) – 5:20*
12. "Long Jumping Jeweller" (G. Shorrock) – 4:46*
- *1997 re-release bonus tracks

== Personnel ==
- Beeb Birtles – lead vocals, guitars
- Ric Formosa – guitars, slide guitar, dobro, lead vocals on "Bourbon Street"
- Graham Goble – vocals, guitars
- Roger McLachlan – bass guitar
- Derek Pellicci – drums, percussion
- Glenn Shorrock – lead vocals, harmonica, acoustic guitar on "Seine City"

== Additional musicians ==
- Accordion [piano accordion] – Aurora Moratti
- Alto saxophone, Flute – Graeme Lyall
- Cor anglais – Eddy Denton
- Keyboards – Ian Mason
- Mandolin – Kerryn Tolhurst
- Steel guitar [pedal] – Mike Burke (3)
- Tenor saxophone – Tony Buchanan
- Trombone – Don Lock
- Trumpet – Bobby Vinier, Peter Salt

== Production details ==
- Engineering – Ross Cockle (recording and remix)
- Producer – Little River Band

== Charts ==
Chart (1976)	Peak position
Australia (Kent Music Report)	5
