= Help Is on Its Way =

1977 single by Little River Band

Single by Little River Band

from the album Diamantina Cocktail
- B-side: "Changed and Different"/"The Inner Light"
- Released: April 1977
- Recorded: 1976
- Genre: Pop rock, soft rock
- Length: 4:04
- Label: EMI / Harvest
- Songwriter: Glenn Shorrock
- Producers: John Boylan, Little River Band

Little River Band singles chronology
"I'll Always Call Your Name" (1977)	"Help Is on Its Way" (1977)	"Witchery" (1977)

"Help Is on Its Way" is a song by Australian band Little River Band, released in April 1977 as the lead single from the group's third studio album, Diamantina Cocktail. The song peaked at number one on the Australian Kent Music Report singles chart. The song also peaked at No. 14 on the Billboard Hot 100.

At the Australian 1977 King of Pop Awards, the song won Australian Record of the Year.

At the 1978 Australian Record Awards, the song won Top 40 Record of the Year.

The song was also covered by Keith Urban on his 2026 album, Flow State.

== Reception ==
Cash Box magazine said "Using classic chord progressions, this pop group from Australia builds carefully detailed arrangements that show case a tight vocal blend and bright guitar melodies. A strong sense of the dramatic build up geared for top 40 and AOR play."

== Track listings ==
Australian 7" (EMI 11405)
A. "Help Is on Its Way" - 4:04
B. "Changed and Different" - 3:50

New Zealand 7" (EMI 1064)
A. "Help Is on Its Way" - 4:04
B. "Changed and Different" - 3:50

North American 7" (Harvest 4428)
A. "Help Is on Its Way" - 4:04
B. "The Inner Light" - 3:30

Dutch (EMI – 5C 006-82 380)
A. "Help Is on Its Way" - 4:04
B1. "Changed and Different" - 3:50
B2. "L.A. in the Sunshine"

== Charts ==
=== Weekly charts ===
Chart (1977)	Peak position
Australia (Kent Music Report)	1
Canada Top Singles (RPM)	10
Netherlands (Single Top 100)	21
US Billboard Hot 100	14

=== Year-end charts ===
Chart (1977)	Peak position
Australia (Kent Music Report)	18
Canada (RPM)	102
