= John Boylan (music producer) =

American record producer (born 1941)

- Born: John Patrick Boylan II; March 21, 1941 (age 85); Brooklyn, New York, U.S.
- Genres: Rock; country; pop; soundtrack; children's
- Occupations: Record producer; songwriter; A&R executive; manager; teacher
- Years active: 1966–present
- Labels: Epic; Columbia; Capitol; Asylum; Geffen; Verve; Warner; Rhino; RCA; Atlantic

John Patrick Boylan (born March 21, 1941) is an American record producer, musician, songwriter, music publisher and A&R executive.

== Early life ==
The eldest of six children, Boylan was born on March 21, 1941, in Brooklyn, New York. His father, John Wilson Boylan, M.D., was a physician and educator and his mother, Jean Curtin Boylan, was a homemaker. He grew up in Buffalo, New York where his father taught at the State University of New York at Buffalo Medical School, and he credits the city's lively music scene as an early influence. In the mid-1950s, the family lived for two years in Cambridge, England, and Boylan attended The Leys School there, which he credits for further broadening his musical horizons.

== Career ==
After graduating from Bard College as a Theatre Arts major, Boylan moved to Greenwich Village in New York City. With his brother Terence Boylan, he formed a folk-rock band called the Ginger Men, playing mostly at the Night Owl Café, home base of the Lovin' Spoonful, James Taylor (with his band, Flying Machine), Richie Havens, and other artists of that era. When the band dissolved, he and his brother were signed as staff songwriters at Koppelman-Rubin Associates, home of John Sebastian, Tim Hardin and other hit songwriters. While on staff there, the brothers recorded a concept album for Verve/Forecast called Playback by the Appletree Theatre, a collection of songs interspersed with social commentary.

In late 1967, one of Boylan's songs was recorded by Rick Nelson, and he was asked to produce the next Nelson album, Another Side of Rick, for Decca Records, Over the next two years, Boylan put together a backup group for Rick called the Stone Canyon Band which included ex-Poco bassist Randy Meisner, and produced a comeback hit for Rick with the Bob Dylan song “She Belongs to Me”. During that time, Boylan decided to move to Los Angeles and in 1969, he produced the Association, including a soundtrack project for the film “Goodbye, Columbus”.

With his next project, producing the influential bluegrass group, the Dillards, Boylan became part of the burgeoning country-rock movement centered around the Troubadour nightclub in West Hollywood. In 1970, he was approached by Linda Ronstadt who asked him to produce her next record and to help her put together a backing band for her as he had done for Rick Nelson. First to be hired were Glenn Frey of the duet group Longbranch Pennywhistle, and Don Henley of the Texas band, Shiloh. While on their first tour in April, 1971, Glenn and Don decided to form their own band. With Ronstadt and Boylan's help, they recruited Randy Meisner from the Stone Canyon Band and Bernie Leadon from the Flying Burrito Brothers. The new group, now called Eagles, was signed by David Geffen to his management firm and to his new label, Asylum Records.

While working on her new album with Boylan producing, Linda parted ways with her former manager. Boylan suggested she ask Peter Asher, who was managing his friend James Taylor, but unfortunately, Asher had a conflict and was unable to accept at that time. Linda asked Boylan to fill in and take over as manager. For the next two years, Boylan handled her career and produced two albums, including the platinum-selling Don’t Cry Now. In addition, he engineered her transfer from Capitol to Asylum Records. In mid-1973, Peter Asher became available again, and took over Linda's management.

In 1974, Boylan reactivated his publishing company, Great Eastern Music, to administer his own material, and went back to fulltime record production as an independent. In the mid-1970s, he worked on projects by Brewer & Shipley, Pure Prairie League, Danny O’Keefe, and Commander Cody and His Lost Planet Airmen. His next project, however, arrived from an unlikely source. When his friend Paul Ahern, who had been working in promotion at Atlantic Records, played him a demo tape of an unknown band from New England, Boylan came on board as co-producer, part of a package they shopped to Epic Records. The subsequent album, recorded with the band's leader and co-producer Tom Scholz, was titled Boston, and became the best-selling debut album in history, over 20 million units worldwide.

Shortly after delivering the finished master of Boston to Epic Records, Gregg Geller, then the head of A&R for Epic Records in Los Angeles, offered Boylan a position at the label, where he spent the next twelve years, rising to the position of vice-president. During his time at Epic, he worked with many of the label's artists, including as Executive Producer for REO Speedwagon's platinum album, You Can Tune a Piano but You Can’t Tuna Fish, and for the multi-platinum follow-up album by Boston, Don’t Look Back. As an A&R Executive, along with colleague Dick Wingate, he signed the new-wave group, 'Til Tuesday, fronted by songwriter Aimee Mann. His contract also allowed him to produce one album a year for an outside label.

In the mid-1970s, Boylan was invited as a guest speaker by the Recording Industry Association of New Zealand (now called Recorded Music NZ). During that time he also visited Australia and was impressed by several of the local artists in both countries, notably New Zealand's Split Enz and Australia's Little River Band.

The next in-house project that Boylan produced was an artist already signed to Epic, the Charlie Daniels Band. Working in Nashville, they recorded Charlie's breakthrough album, Million Mile Reflections, featuring the Grammy-winning single “The Devil Went Down to Georgia”, which reached Number One on the Billboard Country Charts, Number Three on the Pop Charts, and was featured in the film, Urban Cowboy. Boylan went on to produce six more studio albums with the CDB, as well as numerous live recordings.

After Boylan had praised the music he had heard Down Under to Capitol Records A&R chief Rupert Perry, he was offered a chance to produce the Little River Band, newly signed to EMI in Australia and Capitol Records in the U.S. He traveled to Melbourne in early 1977 and recorded the album Diamantina Cocktail, including the hit singles “Help Is on Its Way” and “Happy Anniversary”. Again in 1978 and 1979, Boylan returned to Australia to record Sleeper Catcher and First Under the Wire, both platinum sellers which yielded four chart singles.

David Geffen brought Boylan his next project, an unknown band from Portland, Oregon called Seafood Mama. Signed to the newly formed Geffen Records by A&R executive Carole Childs, the group took on a new name, Quarterflash. Produced by Boylan, their eponymous debut album was released in 1981 and contained the hit singles “Harden My Heart” and “Find Another Fool”. Boylan went on to produce their next album and a concert video for Cinemax.

In the late 1980s, CBS sold its two record companies, Columbia and Epic, to the Sony Corporation and Boylan became an independent producer and publisher again.

Through the 1990s, he worked with Carly Simon and Nelson, the group fronted by the sons of Rick Nelson who had given Boylan his start as a producer. He also continued his working relationship with Little River Band and with Charlie Daniels, producing Charlie's only children's project for Sony Wonder.

In the early 2000s, Linda Ronstadt called Boylan and asked him to co-produce a classical album with her, after which he co-produced her next two albums, A Merry Little Christmas, and Hummin' to Myself. In 2004, he once again was asked to become her personal manager. In 2010, Ronstadt retired from singing for health reasons, and Boylan continued working with her on catalog releases and other projects, including a memoir, Simple Dreams, that was sold to Simon & Schuster and became a New York Times best-seller. For three years after the book's publication, they toured with a one-woman show in which Ms. Ronstadt talked about the book and her career, showing slides and presenting musical clips.

In 2019, working with directors Rob Epstein and Jeffrey Friedman, and producer James Keach, Boylan did the music supervision for the acclaimed documentary Linda Ronstadt – The Sound of My Voice, which premiered at the Tribeca Film Festival and was broadcast by CNN. The production won a Grammy for Best Musical Film.

In 2021, he engineered the sale of Ronstadt's catalog to Iconic Artists Group, headed by longtime friend Irving Azoff. Boylan is acting as liaison between Linda and the company for future projects. In 2022, Boylan partnered with James Keach to produce an authorized biographical feature film about the life and career of Linda Ronstadt, based on her memoir.

=== Film and television work ===
Throughout his career, Boylan has produced music for the film industry, beginning in 1969 with the Paramount release, Goodbye, Columbus. The most notable soundtracks he worked on were Urban Cowboy, Footloose, and Cry-Baby.

=== Children's music ===
In 1990 Boylan produced two albums starring the cast of the animated TV show, The Simpsons. He also produced albums by the Chipmunks, The Muppets, and a project for Sesame Workshop called Elmopalooza, which starred Jon Stewart and musical guests. A TV special aired on ABC in 1998, and the CD from the special won a Grammy for Best Children's Album.

=== Teaching ===
In 1990, Boylan began teaching part time at UCLA Extension. His course, Record Production 448.6, was offered every fall semester until 2001, when he left Los Angeles and re-located to New York. Upon his return to Los Angeles in 2003, he began guest lectures at Citrus College and in 2005 he joined the Adjunct Faculty, teaching three courses: in the Recording Arts Department, he taught REC 145 (Critical Listening for Audio Engineers), and REC 245 (Careers in the Music Industry for Audio Engineers), and in the Music Department, he taught MUS 254, a Songwriter's Workshop. He retired from teaching in June 2022, but continues to do guest lectures there and at other colleges.
