= Terence Boylan =

American singer-songwriter (born 1946)

Terence Curtin Boylan (born 1946) is an American singer-songwriter.

Brought up in Buffalo, New York, Terence Boylan first appeared on local radio in the late 1950s performing a song he had written at the age of 11. While still in his mid teens, in the early 1960s, he performed in Greenwich Village and, following a chance meeting with Bob Dylan, was encouraged to pursue a solo music career in upstate New York. He attended Bard College in New York and, with his older brother John, formed a band, the Ginger Men. By 1967, they had both signed with Verve Records, for whom they then recorded an experimental concept album, Playback, issued in the name of the Appletree Theatre.

After John Boylan moved to California, Terence stayed in New York City, returned to college, and played with classmates Walter Becker and Donald Fagen. With them, he cut a solo LP, Alias Boona in 1969, the title referring to his nickname. He then moved to California, working again with his brother. After a few years he was signed to Asylum Records, and he recorded his second album in 1977. Like his previous record, this was well received by critics but was never more than a cult success. However, Boylan did enjoy some success as a songwriter when Iain Matthews turned his song "Shake It" into a top five hit.

Following a third album, Suzy, Boylan has principally involved himself with songwriting and soundtrack work, and his own record label and publishing company, Spinnaker Records.

At the age of nine, Boylan sent a letter to the U.S. National Institutes of Health requesting a $10 "grant" to build a rocket ship. The peer review panel was so impressed with the young boy's initiative that they each contributed money to total $10 to send to Boylan. He has since been a big supporter of science, science education, and medical research. He is executive director of the John Boylan Medical Research Foundation which supports research and international scientist exchange fellowships and serves as Chairman of the Board of Trustees of the Mount Desert Island Biological Lab. Boylan has also supported children's educational programs at the Center for Scientific Review at the U.S. National Institutes of Health.

== Discography ==
- Alias Boona (1969)
- Terence Boylan (1977)
- Suzy (1980)
- Terence Boylan (1999) – (Compilation)
