= Ric Formosa =

- Also known as: Rick Formosa
- Born: Riccardo Formosa; 1 September 1954 (age 71); Rome, Italy
- Genres: Pop, classical
- Occupations: Musician; composer; arranger
- Instrument: Guitar
- Years active: 1974–present
- Formerly of: Little River Band

Riccardo Formosa (born 1 September 1954) is an Italian-born Australian musician and composer. He was the lead guitarist of the pop band Little River Band from 1975 to 1976 and recorded their first two albums, Little River Band and After Hours.

== Early life ==
Formosa was born in Rome, Italy, but grew up in Montreal, Quebec, Canada. He migrated to Australia in 1974 and worked as a music arranger and studio musician. He joined the Little River Band shortly after arriving in Australia.

== Little River Band ==
The original Little River Band (LRB) lead guitarist, Graham Davidge, played only on LRB's first recording session, a cover of The Everly Brothers' song When Will I Be Loved. Formosa replaced Davidge shortly after.

Formosa played on the first two LRB albums, Little River Band and After Hours, including the long guitar solo on It's a Long Way There on the former. For the latter, he wrote the song "Bourbon Street" and co-wrote "Another Runway" with fellow member Beeb Birtles. Formosa toured Australia with LRB, playing 311 shows in 1975–1976. He was replaced by David Briggs in August 1976.

On 19 August 1980, Formosa joined an ensemble of pop artists in a memorial concert for Andrew Durant, the former Stars' guitarist-songwriter who had died earlier that year. Formosa played slide guitar, guitar and piano. A live double-LP, The Andrew Durant Memorial Concert, was released on Mushroom Records in 1980.

== Composer ==
Formosa was awarded an Australia Council fellowship in 1983 and studied with Franco Donatoni at the Accademia Nazionale di Santa Cecilia in Rome and at the Accademia Musicale Chigiana in Siena. He also attended masterclasses in conducting with Franco Ferrara. On returning to Australia, Formosa worked for Victorian College of the Arts, the Victorian Arts Studio and Musica Viva. Formosa works as an arranger, conductor and studio musician for recordings, radio and television. He also has an extensive catalogue of compositions.

=== Awards ===
Formosa has won awards and commendations during his career, including:

Year	Award	Organisation
1988	John Bishop Memorial Prize	University of Adelaide
1991	Gold Lion Award	Cannes Advertising Festival
1991	Best International Television Commercial (Music)	Mobius Advertising Awards
2003	Best Music for Children's Television	APRA Screen Music Awards

== Family ==
Formosa's daughter Antonella is a successful singer who performs and records as A-Love.
