= Little River Band discography =

- Studio albums: 18
- Extended plays: 1
- Live albums: 5
- Compilation albums: numerous
- Singles: 39
- Music videos: 3

This is the discography of Australian rock music group Little River Band. To the present they have released 18 studio albums, four live albums, and numerous compilation albums.

== Albums ==
=== Studio albums ===
Title	Album details	Peak chart positions						Certifications (sales thresholds)
Title	Album details	AUS	GER	NLD	NZL	SWI	US	Certifications (sales thresholds)
Little River Band	Released November 1975; Label: EMI (EMA 318)	17	—	—	—	—	80	ARIA: 2× Gold
After Hours	Released April 1976; Label: EMI (EMC 2546)	5	—	—	—	—	—	
Diamantina Cocktail	Released: April 1977; Label: EMI (EMC 2575)	2	—	5	30	—	49	RIAA: Gold
Sleeper Catcher	Released: May 1978; Label: EMI (EMC 2660)	4	—	—	12	—	16	ARIA: 2× Platinum; RIAA: Platinum
First Under the Wire	Released: July 1979; Label: Capitol (11954)	2	—	—	19	—	10	RIAA: Platinum
Time Exposure	Released: August 1981; Label: Capitol (12163)	9	38	41	—	—	21	RIAA: Gold
The Net	Released: May 1983; Label: Capitol (12273)	11	31	23	14	—	61	
Playing to Win	Released: January 1985; Label: Capitol (240252)	38	—	—	18	—	75	
No Reins	Released: May 1986; Label: Capitol (240554)	85	—	—	—	—	—	
Monsoon	Released: June 1988; Label: MCA (42147-1)	9	—	—	—	—	—	
Get Lucky	Released: March 1990; Label: MCA (6369-1)	54	—	—	—	35	—	
Where We Started From	Released: November 2000; Label: Scream Marketing (SCR-5)	—	—	—	—	—	—	
Test of Time	Released: June 2004; Label: Little River Band	—	—	—	—	—	—	
Re-arranged	Released: June 2006; Label: Little River Band	—	—	—	—	—	—	
We Call It Christmas	Released: November 2007; Label: Little River Band; Re-released in 2011 as A Little River Band Christmas	—	—	—	—	—	—	
Cuts Like a Diamond	Released: 23 August 2013; Label: Frontiers Records (FR CD 612)	—	—	—	—	—	—	
The Hits...Revisited	Released: 1 October 2016; Label: Little River Band	—	—	—	—	—	—	
Black Tie	Released: May 2020; Label: Euterpe Records	—	—	—	—	—	—	
"—" denotes releases that did not chart

=== Live albums ===
Title	Album details	Peak chart positions			Certification
Title	Album details	AUS	NZL	US	Certification
Backstage Pass	Released October 1979; Label: EMI (EMC 2701)	18	50	44	AUS: Platinum
Live in America	Released April 1980; Label: Capitol (25517)	35	—	—	
Live Classics	Released 1992; Label: Blue Martin (BLM 330052–2); Recorded on their 1992 world tour	—	—	—	
One Night in Mississippi	Released July 2002; Recorded live in the 1980s	—N/a	—N/a	—	
Standing Room Only	Released February 2007; Label: Sony BMG Music (A 703555); Recorded: 2006 on North American Tour.	—N/a	—N/a	—	
"—" denotes releases that did not chart

=== Compilation albums ===
- The Little River Band have released numerous compilations; both official and unofficial. Below is a list of those that have charted on a national chart.

List of charting compilations
Title	Album details	Peak chart positions						Certifications (sales thresholds)
Title	Album details	AUS	GER	NLD	NZL	SWI	US	Certifications (sales thresholds)
It's a Long Way There (Greatest Hits)	Released: September 1978; Label: EMI (EMA 328)	4	—N/a	—N/a	12	—N/a	—N/a	
Greatest Hits [Greatest Hits Vol II in Australia]	Released: November 1982; Label: Capitol (Play 1023)	13	54	—	1	—	33	NZL: 3× Platinum; RIAA: 2× Platinum
Too Late to Load	Released: April 1989; Label: MCA (6369-1)	—	—	—	—	—	—	
Worldwide Love	Released: 1991; Label: Curb Records (D2-77468)	—N/a	—	—	—N/a	40	—	
The Classic Collection	Released: November 1992; Label: EMI (814075-2)	8	—	—	1	—	—	ARIA: Platinum
Forever Blue: The Very Best of	Released: June 1995 (Netherlands only); Label: Capitol (72438340092 8)	—N/a	—N/a	14	—N/a	—N/a	—N/a	
The Definitive Collection	Released: 2002; Label: EMI (7243540765 2 7)	31	—	—	—	—	—	ARIA: 2× Platinum
Ultimate Hits	Released: 14 October 2022; Label: EMI (5396742)	29	—	—	—	—	—	
Masterpieces	Released: 14 October 2022; Label: EMI (5396749)	75	—	—	—	—	—	
"—" denotes releases that did not chart

== Singles ==
Year	Title	Peak chart positions							Album
Year	Title	AUS	CAN	NLD	NZL	US	US A/C	US CB	Album
1975	"Curiosity (Killed the Cat)"	15	—N/a	—N/a	—N/a	—N/a	—N/a	—N/a	Little River Band
1975	"Emma"	20	—N/a	—N/a	—	—N/a	—N/a	—N/a	Little River Band
1976	"Everyday of My Life"	29	—N/a	—N/a	—	—N/a	—N/a	—N/a	After Hours
1976	"It's a Long Way There"	35	72	14	32	28	—	31	Little River Band
1977	"I'll Always Call Your Name"	—N/a	76	—	—N/a	62	—	71	Little River Band
1977	"Help Is on Its Way"	1	10	21	—	14	—	14	Diamantina Cocktail
1977	"Witchery"	33	—N/a	—N/a	—	—N/a	—N/a	—N/a	Diamantina Cocktail
1977	"Home on Monday"	73	—N/a	12	—	—N/a	—N/a	—N/a	Diamantina Cocktail
1977	"Happy Anniversary"	—N/a	21	—	—	16	—	22	Diamantina Cocktail
1978	"Shut Down Turn Off"	16	—N/a	—	—	—N/a	—N/a	—N/a	Sleeper Catcher
1978	"Reminiscing"	35	7	—	17	3	10	3	Sleeper Catcher
1978	"Lady"	46	29	—	28	10	7	10	Sleeper Catcher
1979	"Lonesome Loser"	19	3	—	31	6	15	7	First Under the Wire
1979	"Cool Change"	—N/a	7	—	25	10	8	13	First Under the Wire
1979	"It's Not a Wonder" (live)	—	—	—	—	51	—	62	Live in America
1980	"Red Shoes" (live)	—	—N/a	—N/a	—N/a	—N/a	—N/a	—N/a	Live in America
1981	"Long Jumping Jeweller"	32	—N/a	—N/a	—	—N/a	—N/a	—N/a	Non-LP single, issued only in AUS/NZ
1981	"The Night Owls"	18	16	—	46	6	33	7	Time Exposure
1981	"Take It Easy on Me"	—	17	—	—	10	14	13	Time Exposure
1982	"Ballerina"	—N/a	—N/a	—	—N/a	—N/a	—N/a	—N/a	Time Exposure
1982	"Man on Your Mind"	—	37	—	—	14	26	13	Time Exposure
1982	"Down on the Border"	7	—N/a	—	—	—N/a	—N/a	—N/a	Greatest Hits
1982	"St. Louis"	43	—N/a	—N/a	—	—N/a	—N/a	—N/a	Greatest Hits
1983	"The Other Guy"	18	30	—	2	11	6	8	Greatest Hits
1983	"We Two"	49	37	—	32	22	17	26	The Net
1983	"You're Driving Me Out of My Mind"	—	—	49	—	35	—	42	The Net
1985	"Playing to Win"	59	—	—	—	60	—	49	Playing to Win
1985	"Blind Eyes"	—	—	—N/a	—	—	—	—	Playing to Win
1986	"No Reins on Me"	73	—N/a	—N/a	—N/a	—N/a	—N/a	—N/a	No Reins
1986	"Time for Us"	—N/a	—	—	—	—	—	—	No Reins
1986	"Face in the Crowd"	—	—	—N/a	—	—	—	—	No Reins
1986	"When the War Is Over"	—	—	—N/a	—	—	—	—	No Reins
1988	"Love Is a Bridge"	6	47	—N/a	—	—	18	—	Monsoon
1988	"Son of a Famous Man"	—	—	—N/a	—	—	—	—	Monsoon
1988	"Soul Searching"	—	—N/a	—	—N/a	—N/a	—N/a		Monsoon
1988	"It's Cold Out Tonight" (North America only)	—N/a	—	—N/a	—N/a	—	—	—	Monsoon
1989	"When Will I Be Loved"	169	—	—N/a	—N/a	—N/a	—N/a	—N/a	Too Late to Load
1989	"Listen to Your Heart" (North America, Europe, Japan)	—N/a	—	—N/a	—N/a	—	—	—	The Karate Kid Part III (soundtrack)
1990	"If I Get Lucky"	75	—	—N/a	—	—	22	—	Get Lucky
1990	"Every Time I Turn Around"	134	—	—N/a	—	—	27	—	Get Lucky
1991	"Worldwide Love" (Europe only)	—N/a	—N/a	—N/a	—N/a	—N/a	—N/a	—N/a	Worldwide Love
1995	"Forever Blue"	—N/a	—N/a	12	—N/a	—N/a	—N/a	—N/a	Forever Blue: The Very Best Of
"—" denotes releases that did not chart / n/a denotes was not released in this territory

== VHS and DVD releases ==
Title	Album details	Peak chart positions
Title	Album details	AUS
Live Exposure	Released: September 2009; Label: Capitol (243866-9); Recorded: Concert in Houston, Texas (1981)	23
LRB Live	Released: November 2020; Label: Possum/Fanfare Classics (FANFARE384); Recorded: Concert in Baden-Baden, Germany (1991)	41
