= The Definitive Collection (Little River Band album) =

Greatest hits album by Little River Band
- Released: 2002
- Recorded: 1975–1985
- Genre: Rock; pop rock
- Length: 78:45
- Label: EMI, Capitol
- Producer: Little River Band

Little River Band chronology
Where We Started From (2000)	The Definitive Collection (2002)	Test of Time (2004)

Professional ratings
Review scores
Source	Rating
AllMusic	4.5/5 stars

The Definitive Collection is a greatest hits compilation by Australian rock group Little River Band, released in 2002. The album debuted and peaked on the ARIA chart in April 2015 at number 32 and was certified double platinum.

== Track listing ==
No.	Title	Writer(s)	Length
1.	"It's a Long Way There"	Graeham Goble	8:39
2.	"Curiosity (Killed the Cat)"	Beeb Birtles	3:40
3.	"Emma"	Glenn Shorrock	3:04
4.	"Everyday of My Life"	Birtles	3:40
5.	"Help Is on Its Way"	Shorrock	3:55
6.	"Home on Monday"	Birtles, Shorrock	3:51
7.	"Happy Anniversary"	Birtles, David Briggs	3:58
8.	"Shut Down Turn Off"	Shorrock	3:58
9.	"Reminiscing"	Goble	4:09
10.	"Lady"	Goble	4:43
11.	"Lonesome Loser"	Briggs	3:52
12.	"Cool Change"	Shorrock	4:51
13.	"The Night Owls"	Goble	5:07
14.	"Take It Easy on Me"	Goble	3:45
15.	"Man on Your Mind"	Shorrock	4:05
16.	"We Two"	Goble	4:25
17.	"Down on the Border"	Goble	2:56
18.	"The Other Guy"	Goble	2:49
19.	"Playing to Win"	John Farnham, Goble	2:57
Total length:			1:18:45

== Personnel ==
- Glenn Shorrock - lead vocals (tracks 1–15)
- Graeham Goble - guitars and backing vocals (all tracks)
- Beeb Birtles - guitars and backing vocals (tracks 1–18)
- Derek Pellicci - drums (tracks 1–18)
- Ric Formosa - lead guitar (tracks 1–4)
- Roger McLachlan - bass guitar (tracks 1–4)
- David Briggs - lead guitar (tracks 5–15)
- George McArdle - bass guitar (tracks 5–11)
- Wayne Nelson - lead vocals and bass guitar (track 13), bass guitar and backing vocals (tracks 14–19)
- Stephen Housden - lead guitar (tracks 16–19)
- John Farnham - lead vocals (tracks 16–19)
- David Hirschfelder - keyboards (tracks 16, 19)
- Steve Prestwich - drums (track 19)

== Additional personnel ==
- Geoff Skewes - clavinet
- Gary Hyde - percussion
- Ian Piano - acoustic piano
- Bobby Venier - trumpets, flugelhorn
- Peter Salt - trumpets
- Don Lock - trombone
- Tony Buchanan - tenor saxophone
- Graeme Lyall - alto saxophone
- Peter Sullivan - piano
- Peter Jones - electric piano
- Clive Harrison - bass guitar
- Mike Clarke - bass guitar
- Bill Harrower - tenor saxophone

== Charts ==
Chart (2015)	Peak position
Australian Albums (ARIA)	31

== Certifications ==
Region	Certification	Certified units/sales
Australia (ARIA)	2× Platinum	140,000^{^}
^{^} Shipments figures based on certification alone.
