= Greatest Hits (Little River Band album) =

Greatest hits album by Little River Band
- Released: November 1982
- Genre: Rock
- Length: 49:43; 77:14 (Expanded edition)
- Label: Capitol

Little River Band chronology
Time Exposure (1981)	Greatest Hits (1982)	The Net (1983)

Singles from Greatest Hits
- 1. "Down on the Border" Released: July 1982; 2. "St. Louis" Released: November 1982; 3. "The Other Guy" Released: February 1983

Professional ratings
Review scores
Source	Rating
AllMusic	(1982)
AllMusic	(2000)

Greatest Hits (titled Greatest Hits Vol. II in Australia) is a compilation of hits by the Australian band Little River Band, released in November 1982. The album peaked at No. 13 on the Australian Kent Music Report albums chart, at No. 1 in New Zealand, and at No. 33 on the Billboard 200. It included two new tracks, "The Other Guy" and "Down on the Border", to introduce the band's new lead singer, John Farnham. In 1992, it was certified 2× Platinum by the RIAA.

The album was digitally remastered and repackaged with additional tracks in an expanded edition in 2000.

== Reception ==
Cash Box magazine said "This is a unique 'best of' package in that it serves to close the door of one era of this most popular Australian band's career while ushering in another. Glenn Shorrock, the 'voice' of LRB for so many years, has departed for a solo flight, while the 'new' lineup with lead singer John Farnham is represented here by the currently rising Top 40 tune 'The Other Guy' and 'Down on the Border'. Fans of LRB can reminisce over 'Reminiscing', 'Lady', 'Help Is On The Way' [sic], 'Lonesome Loser', 'Happy Anniversary', 'Night Owls' and the more recent hits, 'Man On Your Mind' and 'Take It Easy On Me'."

== Track listing ==
All tracks are written by Graham Goble, unless otherwise noted.

International version (1982)
No.	Title	Writer(s)	Original album	Length
1.	"It's a Long Way There" (short version)		Little River Band (1975)	4:12
2.	"Help Is on Its Way"	Glenn Shorrock	Diamantina Cocktail (1977)	4:04
3.	"Reminiscing"		Sleeper Catcher (1978)	4:13
4.	"Man on Your Mind"	Glenn Shorrock; Kerryn Tolhurst	Time Exposure (1981)	4:16
5.	"The Other Guy"		New song	2:49
6.	"The Night Owls"		Time Exposure (1981)	5:19
7.	"Lonesome Loser"	David Briggs	First Under the Wire (1979)	3:58
8.	"Take It Easy on Me"		Time Exposure (1981)	3:45
9.	"Down on the Border"		new song	2:55
10.	"Happy Anniversary"	David Briggs; Birtles	Diamantina Cocktail (1977)	4:03
11.	"Lady"		Sleeper Catcher (1978)	4:55
12.	"Cool Change"	Glenn Shorrock	First Under the Wire (1979)	5:14
Total length:				49:43

Australian version - Greatest Hits Vol II (1982)
No.	Title	Writer(s)	Original album	Length
1.	"Lonesome Loser"	David Briggs	First Under the Wire (1979)	4:12
2.	"I'll Always Call Your Name"	Beeb Birtles	Little River Band (1975)	3:38
3.	"Down on the Border"		New song	2:35
4.	"Broke Again"	Graham Goble; Beeb Birtles	After Hours (1976)	3:25
5.	"The Other Guy"		New song	2:50
6.	"Long Jumpin' Jeweller"	Glenn Shorrock	After Hours (1976)	4:47
7.	"The Night Owls"		Time Exposure (1981)	3:51
8.	"Take It Easy on Me"		Time Exposure (1981)	3:45
9.	"St. Louis"	Harry Vanda; George Young	New Song	3:35
10.	"Statue of Liberty"	Glenn Shorrock	Little River Band (1975)	3:28
11.	"It's Not a Wonder"		First Under the Wire (1979)	3:55
12.	"Cool Change"	Glenn Shorrock	First Under the Wire (1979)	5:09
Total length:				45:10

Expanded edition (2000)
No.	Title	Writer(s)	Original album	Length
1.	"Lonesome Loser"	David Briggs	First Under the Wire (1979)	3:58
2.	"Help Is on Its Way"	Glenn Shorrock	Diamantina Cocktail (1977)	4:04
3.	"Cool Change"	Glenn Shorrock	First Under the Wire (1979)	5:14
4.	"Take It Easy on Me"		Time Exposure (1981)	3:45
5.	"Face in the Crowd"		No Reins (1986)	4:38
6.	"Reminiscing"		Sleeper Catcher (1978)	4:13
7.	"The Night Owls"		Time Exposure (1981)	5:19
8.	"Lady"		Sleeper Catcher (1978)	4:55
9.	"We Two"		The Net (1983)	4:33
10.	"The Other Guy"		New song	2:49
11.	"Man on Your Mind"	Glenn Shorrock; Kerryn Tolhurst	Time Exposure (1981)	4:16
12.	"I'll Always Call Your Name"	Beeb Birtles	Little River Band (1975)	4:49
13.	"Down on the Border"		The Net (1983)	2:55
14.	"Happy Anniversary"	David Briggs; Beeb Birtles	Diamantina Cocktail (1977)	4:00
15.	"Playing to Win"	John Farnham; Graham Goble; David Hirschfelder; Stephen Housden; Wayne Nelson; Steve Prestwich; Spencer Proffer	Playing to Win (1985)	4:25
16.	"It's Not a Wonder"		First Under the Wire (1979)	3:58
17.	"You're Driving Me out of My Mind"	Graham Goble; Beeb Birtles	The Net (1983)	5:11
18.	"It's a Long Way There" (short version)		Little River Band (1975)	4:12
Total length:				77:14

== Versions ==
Initial copies of the digitally remastered 2000 edition contained never-before-heard alternative versions of three of its tracks:

- "Take It Easy on Me"

When the band recorded the album Time Exposure in Montserrat with George Martin, two versions of this song were recorded, with Glenn Shorrock and Wayne Nelson respectively on lead vocal. "The Night Owls", with Nelson on lead vocal, had already been selected as the first single from the album. When Martin selected the Nelson version of "Take It Easy on Me" for the album and second single, Shorrock complained, and his version of the song was used instead. It is the Nelson version of "Take It Easy on Me" that appeared on the first 2000 release of Greatest Hits.

- "Man on Your Mind"

The alternative version uses a horn section in the backing music.

- "The Night Owls"

The alternative version has a heavier guitar sound.

Some members of the band objected to these alternative tracks. The remaining CDs were removed from the market and reissued with the original album tracks. The "unauthorised" version is keenly sought by collectors. However, the "unauthorised" version is still used on the Spotify streaming version of Greatest Hits.

== Charts ==
=== Weekly charts ===
Chart (1982–2003)	Peak position
Australian Albums (Kent Music Report)	13
Canada Top Albums/CDs (RPM)	48
German Albums (Offizielle Top 100)	54
New Zealand Albums (RMNZ)	1
US Billboard 200	33

=== Year-end charts ===
Chart (1983)	Position
New Zealand Albums (RMNZ)	10

== Certifications ==
Region	Certification	Certified units/sales
New Zealand (RMNZ)	3× Platinum	45,000^{^}
United States (RIAA)	2× Platinum	2,000,000^{^}
^{^} Shipments figures based on certification alone.
