= Ultimate Hits (Little River Band album) =

Greatest hits album by Little River Band
- Released: 14 October 2022
- Recorded: 1975–1986
- Length: 106:33
- Label: EMI
- Producer: Little River Band

Little River Band chronology
Black Tie (2020)	Ultimate Hits (2022)	Masterpieces (2022)

Ultimate Hits is a greatest hits compilation by Australian rock group Little River Band, released on 14 October 2022. It comprises the band's singles between 1975 and 1986, all remastered for this release. The album debuted at number 29 on the ARIA Charts.

== Track listing ==
CD1

1. "It's a Long Way There" – 8:42
2. "Curiosity (Killed the Cat)" – 3:43
3. "I'll Always Call Your Name" – 4:51
4. "Emma" – 3:28
5. "Everyday of My Life" – 3:51
6. "Help Is on Its Way" – 3:57
7. "Witchery" – 2:51
8. "Home on Monday" – 3:54
9. "Happy Anniversary" – 4:02
10. "Shut Down Turn Off" – 3:54
11. "Reminiscing" – 4:28
12. "Lady" – 4:49

CD2

1. "Lonesome Loser" – 3:59
2. "Cool Change" – 5:13
3. "It's Not a Wonder" – 3:59
4. "I'm Coming Home" – 3:45
5. "The Night Owls" – 5:22
6. "Take It Easy on Me" – 3:48
7. "Man on Your Mind" – 4:17
8. "Down on the Border" – 2:56
9. "The Other Guy" – 2:50
10. "We Two" – 4:33
11. "You're Driving Me Out of My Mind" – 5:14
12. "Playing to Win" – 2:59
13. "Forever Blue" – 5:08

== Charts ==
Chart performance for Ultimate Hits
Chart (2022)	Peak position
Australian Albums (ARIA)	29

== Release history ==
Country	Date	Label	Format	Catalogue	Reference
Australia	14 October 2022	EMI Music	2×CD, digital download	5396742	
Australia	14 October 2022	EMI Music	3×LP	5396746	
