= We Two Pty Ltd v Shorrock (2002) =

2002 Federal Court of Australia decision

- Court: Federal Court of Australia
- Full case name: We Two Pty Ltd v Glenn Barrie Shorrock, Gerard Bertelkamp and Graehame Goble
- Decided: 12 July 2002

Case history
- Subsequent action: We Two Pty Ltd v Shorrock (No 2) (2005)

Court membership
- Judge sitting: Raymond Finkelstein

We Two Pty Ltd v Shorrock (2002) was presided by Justice Raymond Finkelstein of the Federal Court of Australia, Melbourne to determine the ownership of the name Little River Band, its trademarks, logos and associated assets. We Two Pty Ltd, the applicant, was established in 1987 and had been solely owned by Stephen Housden of the music group Little River Band since 1998. The respondents, Glenn Shorrock, Gerard Bertelkamp (p.k.a. Beeb Birtles) and Graeham Goble, were all founding members of the same group, in 1975. Housden had joined them in 1981.

The case involved a counterclaim, The Little River Band Pty Ltd v We Two Pty Ltd, to remove the trademark due to lack of use and return it on the basis of prior ownership. The counter-claimant, The Little River Band Pty Ltd, was a holding company formed in 1975 by Goble and the group's then-talent manager Glenn Wheatley. Early in 2002 Birtles, Shorrock and Goble had formed a music trio, which performed variously as "The Original Little River Band" or "The Voices of Little River Band" and were managed by Wheatley. When Housden was informed he sought a legal injunction for the trio to cease and desist in the use of the name, Little River Band, which led to the court case.

Housden provided documentation to the court showing the assignment of the Little River Band trademarks to We Two, and Birtles' transfer of ownership of the url "littleriverband.com" to We Two in 2000. Housden also provided evidence of We Two's use of the trademark during the statutory period. On the second day of the case the cross-claimants The Little River Band Pty Ltd sought a settlement with We Two Pty Ltd. The terms of the settlement were provided to the judge. He was also asked to rule on any costs owing. Justice Finkelstein ruled that half the taxed costs of We Two Pty Ltd would be paid by the respondents.

== Background ==
Little River Band (LRB), a pop rock music group, were formed in Melbourne in March 1975 by Beeb Birtles (born Gerard Bertelkamp), Graham Davidge, Graeham Goble, Dave Orams, Derek Pellicci and Glenn Shorrock. They were managed by Glenn Wheatley and Goble and Wheatley formed The Little River Band Pty Ltd, a holding company, in 1975. The group had commercial success in Australia and the United States. In August 1981 Stephen Housden joined the line-up of Birtles, Goble, Pellicci, Shorrock, Mal Logan and Wayne Nelson. Birtles left them in 1983 and Wheatley resigned as manager in 1987.

In 1987 We Two Pty Ltd was established, as the holding company for Little River Band, by then-current members Goble, Housden, Nelson, Pellicci and Shorrock as directors in equal share. In 1988 Goble and Wheatley had transferred ownership of the band name, Little River Band, and associated trademarks, logos and assets from their holding company to the new one, We Two Pty Ltd. Goble left the band and the company in 1992 and was followed successively by Nelson and Shorrock in 1996, and Pellicci in 1998. Thereby Housden was the sole owner of We Two Pty Ltd. Thereafter new or returning members of LRB were contracted to his company.

Birtles Shorrock Goble (BSG), another pop rock group, were formed in early 2002 by the former members of Little River Band. They were managed by Wheatley, who revived The Little River Band Pty Ltd, as their holding company with himself and the three members of BSG as directors. They intended to advertise themselves as birtLes shoRrock goBle (highlighting LRB) "The Original Little River Band" or "The Voices of Little River Band". After Housden learnt of the new group he gained a legal injunction for the trio to cease and desist in the use of the name, Little River Band, which led to the court case.

== Court case ==
Justice Raymond Finkelstein of the Federal Court of Australia presided over We Two Pty Ltd v Shorrock (2002) or more fully We Two Pty Ltd v Glenn Barrie Shorrock, Gerard Bertelkamp and Graehame Goble (2002) FCA 875. Written submission began on 17 June 2002. We Two Pty Ltd, the applicant, was represented by counsels M J Colbran QC and S Hinchey and by solicitor Deacons. Glenn Shorrock, Gerard Bertelkamp and Graeham Goble, the respondents were represented by counsel J Bleechmore and solicitor Ronald V Tait.

Housden provided documentation to the court showing the assignment of the Little River Band trademarks to We Two, registered by the United States Patent and Trademark Office in 1989, and Birtles' transfer of ownership of the url "littleriverband.com" to We Two in 2000. Housden also provided evidence of We Two's use of the trademark during the statutory period, hence The Little River Band Pty Ltd withdrew their cross-claim. On the second day of the case the cross-claimants sought a settlement with We Two Pty Ltd. Justice Finkelstein was then asked to rule on any costs owing by any of the parties. On 12 July 2002 he announced his findings and gave the reasons for his decision. He ruled that half the taxed costs of We Two Pty Ltd would be paid by the respondents, The Little River Band Pty Ltd.

== Terms of settlement ==
Justice Finkelstein was informed of the settlement terms by interested parties. He described these to the court, which specified that the respondents, Birtles, Goble and Shorrock, were not to use the band name, trade marks or logos of Little River Band as their name or part thereof. They would be able to refer to themselves as the original members of LRB "but always only in a descriptive way in promotional and advertising material." He also declared his disappointment that the parties had not resolved their disputes without resorting to a court case.

== Aftermath ==
In Australia media reported on the case in June and the settlement in July 2002.

The July 2002 settlement was repeatedly tested, including the blocking of a retrospective DVD, Little River Band: Its a Long Way There, created by Birtles, Shorrock and Goble in 2004 which used historical concert footage. Housden challenged the manner in which BSG described their link to LRB in promotional material and recordings.

Little River Band's classic line-up of Birtles, David Briggs, Goble, Pellici, George McArdle and Shorrock were inducted into the ARIA Hall of Fame on 17 October 2004. They performed "Help Is on the Way", one of the group's early songs, as "Classic Line-up of the Little River Band" or "Little River Band: Classic Line-up" during the ceremony, which was broadcast. Other former or current members were not included in Little River Band's induction into the ARIA Hall of Fame.

Further legal action ensued in Australia, with We Two Pty Ltd v Shorrock (No 2) (2005) presided by Justice Finkelstein, in early July 2005. Both claim and counterclaim were dismissed and judgement reserved pending the outcome of another case being heard at the United States District Court of Florida. In late July of that year BSG and Housden reached a settlement in both cases with BSG allowed to refer to their heritage as the singers, songwriters and former members of LRB.

Birtles Shorrock Goble continued to perform and record until late September 2007. The BSG members have taken out their frustration with the legal situation through song: Goble's "Someone's Taken Our History" (September 2006), Birtles' "Revolving Door" (December 2012), and Shorrock's "Hear My Voice" (July 2016). As from October 2020 LRB continued to perform, largely in the US, and have released new material as well as re-recorded work written by the members of BSG and other early members.
