= The Net (album) =

Studio album by Little River Band
- Released: May 1983
- Recorded: 1982
- Genre: Rock
- Length: 46:14
- Label: Capitol
- Producers: Little River Band, Ernie Rose

Little River Band chronology
Greatest Hits (1982)	The Net (1983)	Playing to Win (1985)

Singles from The Net
- 1. "We Two" Released: May 1983; 2. "You're Driving Me Out Of My Mind" Released: August 1983

The Net is the seventh studio album by Australian group Little River Band. The Net was released in May 1983 and peaked at No. 11 on the Australian Kent Music Report Albums Chart and No. 61 on the Billboard 200.

The Net was their first full studio release to feature John Farnham as new lead vocalist, replacing Glenn Shorrock, and Stephen Housden taking over as lead guitarist for David Briggs. It was also the last album featuring original member Beeb Birtles, who left the line-up after the US tour in support of its release, and drummer Derek Pellicci, who would rejoin the band in 1987.

== Reception ==
Cashbox wrote: "Although Glenn Shorrock's vocals have been replaced by John Farnham's, the original core of the band is still the same as when it began back in 1975. In the past seven years, LRB released about a half-dozen memorable mellow-rock albums, and considering the group's loyal following, it's a cinch that The Net will be another big seller. 'We Two', the disc's first single, is already scaling the charts."

Professional ratings
Review scores
Source	Rating
AllMusic	2/5 stars

== Track listing ==
Side A

1. "You're Driving Me Out of My Mind" (B. Birtles, G. Goble) - 5:11
2. "We Two" (G. Goble) - 4:32
3. "No More Tears" (B. Birtles) - 3:20
4. "Mr. Socialite" (B. Birtles) - 5:24
5. "Down on the Border" (G. Goble) - 2:56

Side B

1. "The Danger Sign" (B. Birtles, F. Howson) - 4:02
2. "Falling" (Housden, Wakeford) - 4:19
3. "Sleepless Nights" (G. Goble) - 5:10
4. "Easy Money" (G. Goble) - 4:02
5. "The Net" (G. Goble) - 4:42
6. "One Day" (G. Goble) - 2:38 (not on original vinyl recording, appeared on 1997 CD reissue)

== Personnel ==
- John Farnham – lead vocals
- Beeb Birtles – guitars, vocals, lead vocals on "Mr. Socialite"
- Graham Goble – guitars, vocals
- David Hirschfelder – keyboards, synthesizers
- Stephen Housden – lead guitar, backing vocals
- Wayne Nelson – bass guitar, vocals, lead vocals on "Easy Money"
- Derek Pellicci – drums, percussion

Additional musicians

- Jon Clarke – saxophones, horns

== Charts ==
Chart (1983)	Peak position
Australia (Kent Music Report)	11
Canada Top Albums/CDs (RPM)	62
German Albums (Offizielle Top 100)	31
Dutch Albums (Album Top 100)	23
New Zealand Albums (RMNZ)	14
US Billboard 200	61
