= George McArdle =

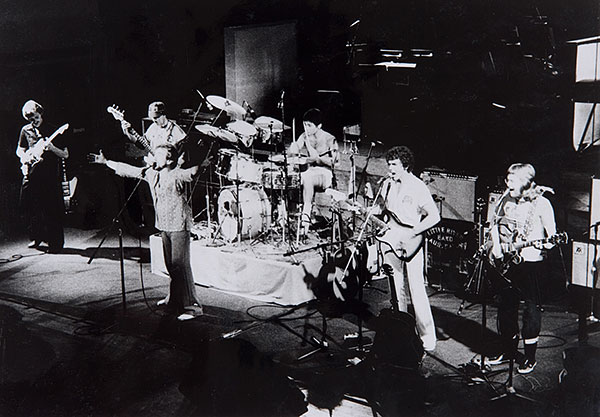
- McArdle, second from left, performing with Little River Band in 1977

Background information
- Born: 30 November 1954 (age 71)
- Occupation: Musician
- Instrument: Bass guitar
- Formerly of: Little River Band
- Website: Facebook page

George McArdle is an Australian bass guitarist. He came from a violent and abusive background and was drawn to alcohol, fighting, theft and rock music.

McArdle joined the pop-rock group Little River Band in August 1976, replacing Roger McLachlan. McArdle played on their studio albums Diamantina Cocktail (1977) and Sleeper Catcher (1978). In January 1979, McArdle left the band to further his Christian studies at a Bible college.

He is considered to be a member of the "classic lineup" of Little River Band. That lineup, Graeham Goble, Beeb Birtles, Derek Pellicci, Glenn Shorrock, David Briggs and McArdle, was inducted into the ARIA Hall of Fame in October 2004.

McArdle's biography, The Man from Little River, written by Denise A. Austin, was published in 2009.
