= Time Exposure (Little River Band album) =

Studio album by Little River Band
- Released: September 1981
- Recorded: 1981
- Studios: AIR Studios (Montserrat), West Indies
- Genre: Rock
- Length: 46:19
- Labels: EMI, Capitol
- Producer: George Martin

Little River Band chronology
Live in America (1980)	Time Exposure (1981)	Greatest Hits (1982)

Singles from Time Exposure
- 1. "The Night Owls" Released: September 1981; 2. "Take It Easy on Me" Released: December 1981; 3. "Ballerina" Released: January 1982 (Europe only); 4. "Man on Your Mind" Released: March 1982

Time Exposure is the sixth studio album by Little River Band (LRB), which was recorded with producer George Martin at Associated Independent Recording (AIR) in Montserrat and released in September 1981. It peaked at No. 9 on the Australian Kent Music Report Albums Chart. In the United States, it reached No. 21 on the Billboard 200.

It was the group's last album with Glenn Shorrock on lead vocals until 1988. In the interim John Farnham took over as main lead vocalist, staying with the band for the next three studio albums. Time Exposure was also the last album with lead guitarist David Briggs who left prior to its release. He was replaced on tour by Stephen Housden, who later joined the group. The album had other band members on lead vocals: Beeb Birtles on two tracks, "Ballerina" and the album closer "Guiding Light", and Wayne Nelson on the opening song and first single "The Night Owls" which peaked at #6 on Billboard's Hot 100, while "Take It Easy On Me" went to #10 and Man On Your Mind" was #14.

== Reception ==
Cash Box magazine said "This pop-rock sextet practically owns Australia, and it doesn't do too badly on the airwaves elsewhere in the world. This time, the inventive Aussies have recruited Beatles studio wizard George Martin as producer, and the musical marriage is one made in heaven. The first three songs on Time Exposure's first side are all potential top 40 hits."

== Track listing ==
Side A
No.	Title	Writer(s)	Length
1.	"The Night Owls"	Graham Goble	5:16
2.	"Man on Your Mind"	Glenn Shorrock, Kerryn Tolhurst	4:14
3.	"Take It Easy on Me"	Graham Goble	3:45
4.	"Ballerina"	Graham Goble, Beeb Birtles	4:02
5.	"Love Will Survive"	Garry Paige, David Briggs	4:38

Side B
No.	Title	Writer(s)	Length
1.	"Full Circle"	Graham Goble	1:54
2.	"Just Say That You Love Me"	Graham Goble	3:59
3.	"Suicide Boulevard"	Beeb Birtles, Frank Howson	3:23
4.	"Orbit Zero"	Glenn Shorrock, Terry Bradford	4:27
5.	"Don't Let the Needle Win"	David Briggs	3:57
6.	"Guiding Light"	Beeb Birtles	3:36
Total length:			46:19

== Personnel ==
- Glenn Shorrock – lead and harmony backing vocals
- Beeb Birtles – acoustic guitar, electric guitar, vocals, lead vocals on "Ballerina" and "Guiding Light"
- Graeham Goble – acoustic guitar, electric guitar, vocals
- Wayne Nelson – bass guitar, vocals, lead vocals on "The Night Owls," bridge vocals on "Take It Easy on Me"
- Derek Pellicci – drums, percussion
- David Briggs – acoustic guitar, lead guitar

Additional musicians

- Bill Cuomo – Prophet 5 synthesizer, clavinet, Hammond organ
- Peter Jones – acoustic piano, electric piano, Hammond organ

Production

- Producer: George Martin
- Recorded at Air Studios (Montserrat), West Indies
- Engineered by Geoff Emerick and Ernie Rose
- Tape Operator: Michael Stavrou
- Mastered at Capitol Records Studios, Hollywood, California by Wally Traugott

== Charts ==
=== Weekly charts ===
Chart (1981/82)	Peak position
Australia (Kent Music Report)	9
Canada Top Albums/CDs (RPM)	32
German Albums (Offizielle Top 100)	38
Dutch Albums (Album Top 100)	41
US Billboard 200	21

=== Year-end charts ===
Year End Chart (1982)	Peak position
U.S. (Billboard 200)	52

== Certifications ==
Region	Certification	Certified units/sales
United States (RIAA)	Gold	500,000^{^}
^{^} Shipments figures based on certification alone.
