= Playing to Win (Little River Band album) =

Studio album by Little River Band
- Released: January 1985
- Recorded: 1983–1984
- Genre: Rock
- Length: 46:47
- Label: Capitol
- Producer: Spencer Proffer

Little River Band chronology
The Net (1983)	Playing to Win (1985)	No Reins (1986)

Singles from Playing to Win
- 1. "Playing to Win" Released: November 1984; 2. "Blind Eyes" Released: 1985

Playing to Win is the eighth studio album by Australian group, Little River Band released on Capitol Records. This album is the second studio album with John Farnham as lead vocalist and the first to be recorded by the band in the United States. The album peaked at No. 38 on the Australian Kent Music Report Albums Chart and at No. 75 on The Billboard 200.

The title song, "Playing to Win", had been drafted by Farnham. By the time it had been through LRB production, every member of the band had a share. Band member Graham Goble analysed the lyrics to determine who contributed, and what percentage of royalties they deserved. Farnham eventually received 55.5% of the royalties.

The first single from the album was "Playing to Win", which was released in November 1984 and reached No. 59 on the Australian Singles Chart, No. 15 on the Billboard Mainstream Rock chart and No. 60 on The Billboard Hot 100. Channel 7 used "Playing to Win" as its football promo for its VFL coverage in early 1985. The second single, "Blind Eyes", failed to enter any chart.

The album was re-released on CD in March 1997 with bonus tracks.

== Track listing ==
1. "Playing to Win" (J. Farnham, G. Goble, S. Proffer) - 3:00
2. "Reappear" (S. Housden, M. Wakeford, G. Goble) - 4:07
3. "Blind Eyes" (J. Farnham, D. Hirschfelder, R. Chapman) - 4:59
4. "Through Her Eyes" (S. Housden, M. Wakeford, G. Goble, S. Proffer) - 5:17
5. "When Cathedrals Were White" (G. Goble, D. Hirschfelder, S. Housden) - 4:25
6. "Relentless" (G. Goble, S. Proffer) - 5:29
7. "Piece of the Dream" (W. Nelson, D. Scheibner, S. Shepherd) - 4:12
8. "Don't Blame Me" (G. Goble) - 3:30
9. "One Shot in the Dark" (S. Housden, M. Wakeford, G. Goble, S. Proffer) - 3:34
10. "Count Me In" (W. Nelson, D. Scheibner) - 3:52

Bonus CD tracks

1. "D" (B. Birtles, G. Goble) - 3:13
2. "Playing to Win" (Extended Version) (J. Farnham, G. Goble, S. Proffer) - 4:25

== Personnel ==
- John Farnham - lead vocals
- Graham Goble - guitar, vocals
- David Hirschfelder - synthesizer, guitar, piano, keyboards, programming, vocals
- Stephen Housden - lead guitar
- Wayne Nelson - bass guitar, vocals, lead vocals on "Piece of the Dream" and "Count Me In"
- Steve Prestwich - drums

== Charts ==
Chart (1985)	Peak position
Australia (Kent Music Report)	38
New Zealand Albums (RMNZ)	18
US Billboard 200	75
