= You're Driving Me Out of My Mind =

1983 single by Little River Band

Single by Little River Band

from the album The Net
- B-side: "Falling"
- Released: 1983
- Recorded: 1982
- Genre: Dance rock
- Length: 3:39 (single version); 5:11 (album & 12" version)
- Label: Capitol Records
- Songwriter(s): Beeb Birtles; Graeham Goble
- Producer(s): Little River Band; Ernie Rose

Little River Band singles chronology
"You're Driving Me Out of My Mind" (1983)	"Stone Love" (1983)

"You're Driving Me Out of My Mind" is a song by the Little River Band. It was released in 1983 as the second single from their album The Net.

The song is the band's final top 40 hit, peaking at No. 35 on the Billboard Hot 100.

== Chart performance ==
Chart (1983)	Peak position
US Billboard Hot 100	35
Netherlands Top 40	11
Netherlands Top 100	49
