= David Hirschfelder =

Australian film score composer, musician (born 1960)

- Born: 18 November 1960 (age 65); Ballarat, Victoria, Australia
- Genres: Pop rock, adult contemporary
- Occupations: Musician, composer
- Instruments: Keyboards, piano, bass
- Years active: 1980–present
- Formerly of: Pyramid; Peter Cupples Band; Little River Band; Blowout; Dragon; John Farnham band; CAB
- Website: davidhirschfelder.com

David Hirschfelder (born 18 November 1960) is an Australian musician, film score composer and performer. As a musician he has been a member of Little River Band and John Farnham Band. He has composed film scores for many films, including Strictly Ballroom, Australia, The Railway Man, The Water Diviner and The Dressmaker. He was nominated for Academy Awards for his scores for Shine and Elizabeth.

== Career ==
=== Musician ===
As a keyboardist, Hirschfelder has been a member of various groups including the jazz fusion band Pyramid, rock band Peter Cupples Band (1980), pop rockers Little River Band (1983–1986), Blowout, Dragon (1987, 1989), adult contemporary singer John Farnham's backing band (1986–1992), and jazz fusion supergroup CAB.

In 1980 Hirschfelder joined the Peter Cupples Band, Cupples had just left his soul-pop group, Stylus, and formed the rock group with Hirschfelder on keyboards, Virgil Donati on drums, Ross Ingliss on guitar and Robert Little on bass guitar. In October 1981 Peter Cupples Band released his debut album, Fear of Thunder. In 1982 Hirschfelder provided piano on Little River Band's album, Greatest Hits. Their next album, The Net had Hirschfelder on keyboards and as co-producer, with the band's line-up including Farnham on lead vocals, Beeb Birtles on guitars and vocals, Graeham Goble on guitars and vocals, Stephen Housden on guitar and backing vocals, Wayne Nelson on bass guitar and vocals, and Derek Pellicci on drums and percussion. He joined the group in September 1983, as they toured in the United States. Their 1984 album, Playing to Win saw Hirschfelder supplying guitar, piano, keyboards, synthesiser, programming and vocals. He also co-wrote the tracks, "When Cathedrals Were White", "Blind Eyes" and "Playing to Win". The latter two were issued as singles, with "Playing to Win" reaching the Billboard Hot 100 in March 1985 and Top 100 on the Australian Kent Music Report Singles Chart. In mid-1986 the group issued No Reins which had Hirschfelder on piano, keyboards and co-writing "Paper Paradise".

After No Reins had been recorded, Hirschfelder left Little River Band to return to Australia and joined Farnham's backing band. In April–June 1986 Farnham recorded his album, Whispering Jack with Hirschfelder on keyboards, drum programs and co-writing "Going, Going, Gone". For touring in support of the album Farnham and Hirschfelder were joined on the Jack's Back Tour by Angus Burchill (or Burchall) on drums, Brett Garsed on lead guitar, and Greg Macainsh on bass guitar (Skyhooks). At that time, Jack's Back Tour was the highest-grossing tour by an Australian act. Hirschfelder remained with Farnham for the studio albums, Age of Reason (July 1988) and Chain Reaction (September 1990). Between these two albums he released his own, Welcome to the Nightclub of My Mind in 1989. In 1992 Hirschfelder left Farnham's backing band to concentrate on his score work for television and feature films. In 1999 he collaborated with David Hobson for the song cycle Inside This Room based on writings by Joseph Campbell and Paulo Coelho.

=== Film composer ===
Hirschfelder's first score work was for the TV series, Skirts and Shadows of the Heart (both in 1990); Ratbag Hero followed in 1991.

He has composed scores for films including Strictly Ballroom (1992), Shine (1996), Sliding Doors (1998), Elizabeth (1998), Hanging Up (2000), Peaches (2004), Australia (2008), and Legend of the Guardians: The Owls of Ga'Hoole (2010).

He has worked numerous times with directors Ian Gilmour, Craig Monahan, Ann Turner, Roger Spottiswoode and Baz Luhrmann.

In 1999, the score for Elizabeth (composed for a 90-piece orchestra and a 40-piece choir) was nominated for an Oscar, and was honoured with a BAFTA award and an APRA award for Best Original Score. He also won the Best Score BAFTA in 1993 for Strictly Ballroom.

He composed for the opening ceremony of the 2000 Summer Olympics in Sydney.

== Selective filmography ==
Year	Film	Directed by	Notes
1990	Skirts	Brendan Maher, Richard Sarell & Ian Gilmour	TV series
1992	Strictly Ballroom	Baz Luhrmann	
1994	Dallas Doll	Ann Turner	
1996	Shine	Scott Hicks	nominated for Academy Award for Best Original Dramatic Score
1996	Dating the Enemy	Megan Simpson Huberman	
1998	Sliding Doors	Peter Howitt	also orchestrator
1998	The Interview	Craig Monahan	
1998	Elizabeth	Shekhar Kapur	also conductor and orchestrator; nominated for Academy Award for Best Original Dramatic Score
1999	What Becomes of the Broken Hearted?	Ian Mune	
2000	Hanging Up	Diane Keaton	
2000	Better Than Sex	Jonathan Teplitzky	
2000	The Weight of Water	Kathryn Bigelow	also conductor
2002	Bootleg	Ian Gilmour	TV mini-series
2003	The Wannabes	Nick Giannopoulos	
2004	Standing Room Only	Deborra-Lee Furness	Short film
2004	Peaches	Craig Monahan	
2004	BlackJack	Peter Andrikidis, Ian Watson & Kate Woods	TV series, all episodes except pilot
2004	The Five People You Meet In Heaven	Lloyd Kramer	TV film; also conductor
2006	Aquamarine	Elizabeth Allen	also conductor
2006	Irresistible	Ann Turner	
2007	Shake Hands with the Devil	Roger Spottiswoode	Won Canadian Screen Award for Best Original Song at the 28th Genie Awards
2008	The Children of Huang Shi	Roger Spottiswoode	
2008	Salute	Matt Norman	documentary
2008	Australia	Baz Luhrmann	also harmonica musician
2009	The Blue Mansion	Glen Goei	
2010	I Love You Too	Daina Reid	
2010	Legend of the Guardians: The Owls of Ga'Hoole	Zack Snyder	Animated film
2011	Sanctum	Alister Grierson	
2012	Beyond Right and Wrong: Stories of Justice and Forgiveness	Lekha Singh, Roger Spottiswoode	documentary
2013	The Railway Man	Jonathan Teplitzky, based on a true story by Eric Lomax	historical drama
2014	Healing	Craig Monahan	drama
2014	The Water Diviner	Russell Crowe	historical drama
2015	The Dressmaker	Jocelyn Moorhouse	drama
2016	A Street Cat Named Bob	Roger Spottiswoode	drama
2017	A Few Less Men	Mark Lamprell	comedy
2017	Dance Academy: The Movie	Jeffrey Walker	drama
2018	In Like Flynn	Russell Mulcahy	drama
2019	Ride Like a Girl	Rachel Griffiths	drama
2024	Sleeping Dogs	Adam Cooper	crime, mystery, thriller

== Discography ==
=== Charting albums ===
List of albums, with Australian chart positions
Title	Album details	Peak chart positions
Title	Album details	AUS
Inside This Room (with David Hobson)	Released: August 1999; Format: CD; Label: Mushroom (MUSH33241.2)	70

== Awards and nominations ==
=== Academy Awards ===
- 1997 Academy Award for Best Original Dramatic Score nomination for Shine
- 1999 Academy Award for Best Original Dramatic Score nomination for Elizabeth

=== ARIA Music Awards ===
The ARIA Music Awards is an annual awards ceremony that recognises excellence, innovation, and achievement across all genres of Australian music. They commenced in 1987.

Year	Nominee / work	Award	Result	Ref.
1993	Strictly Ballroom	Best Original Soundtrack, Cast or Show Album	Nominated	
1999	Elizabeth	Best Original Soundtrack, Cast or Show Album	Won	
1999	The Interview	Best Original Soundtrack, Cast or Show Album	Nominated	
2000	What Becomes of the Broken Hearted?	Best Original Soundtrack, Cast or Show Album	Nominated	
2001	Better Than Sex	Best Original Soundtrack, Cast or Show Album	Nominated	

=== APRA Awards ===
The APRA Awards are held in Australia and New Zealand by the Australasian Performing Right Association to recognise songwriting skills, sales and airplay performance by its members annually.

Year	Nominee / work	Award	Result	Ref.
1998	Shine	Best Film Score	Won	
1999	Elizabeth	Best Film Score	Won	
2008	Children of the Silk Road	Best Film Score	Won	
