= Forever Blue =

Forever Blue may refer to:

- Forever Blue (Chris Isaak album), 1995
- Forever Blue (Blue System album), 1995
- "Forever Blue" (Cold Case), a television episode
- Forever Blue (video game) or Endless Ocean, a 2007 scuba-themed game for Wii
- "Forever Blue", a 1989 single by Swing Out Sister from Kaleidoscope World
- "Forever Blue" (song), a 1986 song by Little River Band
