= Roger McLachlan =

New Zealand bass guitarist (1954–2025)

- Born: 15 January 1954; Riverton, New Zealand
- Died: 16 April 2025 (aged 71) Melbourne, Victoria, Australia
- Genres: Rock music
- Occupation: Musician
- Instrument: Bass guitar
- Years active: 1965–2025
- Formerly of: Little River Band, Stars
- Website: www.rogermclachlan.com

Roger McLachlan (15 January 1954 – 16 April 2025) was a New Zealand bass guitarist based in Australia. He was an early bass player for Little River Band.

== Early life ==
McLachlan was born on 15 January 1954 in the small town of Riverton, near Invercargill, New Zealand. He moved to Australia in 1974 to join the touring band for the stage musical Godspell.

== Little River Band ==
In 1975, McLachlan was invited to join the supergroup Little River Band, replacing the short-tenured Dave Orams. He appeared on the first two albums Little River Band and After Hours, and toured extensively, making 311 appearances with the band. He was replaced by George McArdle in 1976. By 1998, all original members of Little River Band had left. Guitarist Stephen Housden gained ownership of the band name, and asked McLachlan to re-join. He remained with the band for a year, until the pressure of touring in the United States led him to depart again.

== Subsequent career ==
McLachlan joined country-rock outfit Stars in 1976, remaining with them into 1977.

He was a member of the jazz-rock-experimental band Pyramid with David Jones, David Hirschfelder and Bob Venier, releasing albums in 1980 and 1983, and touring Europe in 1983.

As a session musician, he played the bass parts on the international John Farnham hit "You're the Voice" and also recorded fretless bass for "Touch Of Paradise" from the same album.

In the 1990s he joined Geoff Achison's on-going band The Souldiggers, recording several albums and continuing to tour Australia.

In 2012 McLachlan recorded a solo album: Roger This Roger That. He re-released the album with a live performance at Melbourne venue The Fyrefly in 2019.

He was part of the Stars re-formed lineup of 2019. They have released a live DVD, and two new albums: Boundary Rider and One More Circle Round the Sun.

== Death ==
McLachlan died from pancreatic cancer on 16 April 2025, at the age of 71.
