= Birtles & Goble =

Australian pop music duo

- Genres: Pop, soft rock
- Years active: 1978–1980
- Labels: Capitol
- Past members: Beeb Birtles; Graeham Goble

Birtles & Goble were an Australian pop music duo composed of Beeb Birtles (born 28 November 1948 in Amsterdam, Netherlands) and Graeham Goble (born 15 May 1947 in Adelaide, Australia). Although they were both full-time members of Little River Band during the late 1970s and early '80s, they also released an album and three singles as a duo between 1978 and 1980.

== Background ==
Birtles and Goble had worked together since 1972, first in the band Mississippi and then in Little River Band (LRB). LRB had an abundance of songwriters, with Birtles, Goble, Glenn Shorrock and David Briggs all contributing hit songs. Birtles and Goble were prolific songwriters so, despite contributing to four LRB albums by 1978 (Little River Band, After Hours, Diamantina Cocktail and Sleeper Catcher), they had a wealth of material left over.

Birtles noted that "we had so many good songs left over which the guys thought were unsuitable for Little River Band, that we decided to approach Glenn Wheatley with the idea of recording a duo album using our unwanted songs".

== Singles: 1978/79 ==
With Little River Band a going concern, Birtles and Goble issued the single "Lonely Lives" as a duet act in February 1978. The single peaked at a modest #66 on the Kent Music Report for Australia.

Exactly one year later, the duo tried again with more success. Their second single "I'm Coming Home" was a substantial hit, peaking at #6 on the Kent Music Report, and selling over 100,000 copies in the Philippines. Birtles & Goble performed the song live on television programs such as The Don Lane Show and The Paul Hogan Show. The song earned Birtles and Goble a nomination for Best Recorded Songwriters at the 1979 Australian Pop Music Awards.

With the success of "I'm Coming Home", the duo then decided to record an album.

== The Last Romance ==
Album cover of The Last Romance

The Last Romance was recorded with numerous musicians including current and future members of Little River Band. Birtles and Goble each wrote three of the songs, three songs were co-compositions and one track ("He Gives Us All His Love") was written by Randy Newman. As well, both "Lonely Lives" and "I'm Coming Home" were included on the album.

The album (and a new single pulled from it, ""How I Feel Tonight") didn't appear until May 1980, more than a year after the release of "I'm Coming Home". Perhaps due to the delay, the new single and album flopped. Goble believed that the duo suffered from a lack of promotion: "If The Last Romance album had been successful, I expect that Beeb and I would have left Little River Band and recorded as a duo, e.g. 'Hall & Oates'. Our record company (Capitol) were concerned about this possibility and so our album received little support. It was a great experience to record The Last Romance and it remains one of my favorite recordings."

Birtles and Goble did not record again as a duo. Songs from The Last Romance were recorded subsequently by other artists: Mark Holden had an Australian top ten hit with the song "Last Romance", and The Imperials recorded "Into My Life".

The b-side to the third single from The Last Romance, Birtles' paean to his country of birth ("The Netherlands"), subsequently appeared in demo form as a bonus track on the 1997 re-release of the Little River Band album No Reins, showing just how close the song came to being released initially by LRB.

== Discography ==
=== Albums ===
List of albums, with selected details
Title	Details
The Last Romance	Released: May 1980; Format: LP, Cass; Label: Capitol Records (ST.12078)

=== Singles ===
List of singles, with selected chart positions
Title	Year	Peak chart positions	Album
Title	Year	AUS	Album
"Lonely Lives" / "Megan"	1978	66	The Last Romance
"I'm Coming Home" / "You'll Never Change Your Mind"	1979	6	The Last Romance
"How I Feel Tonight" / "The Netherlands"	1980	—	The Last Romance
