= Travis Wellington Hedge =

Australian pop rock band

- L-R: Graeham Goble, Rick Phillips, Shane Simon, Rob Leedham, Greg Trezise

Background information
- Origin: Adelaide, South Australia
- Genres: Pop rock
- Years active: 1968–1969
- Label: RCA Australia
- Past members: Graeham Goble; Shane Simon; Rob Leedham; Greg Trezise; Rick Phillips

Travis Wellington Hedge was an Australian pop rock band, based in Adelaide, that existed from 1968 to 1969. It was an early band of noted musician and composer Graeham Goble, who subsequently achieved success with Mississippi, Little River Band and Birtles Shorrock Goble.

== Performances ==
Travis Wellington Hedge was formed in late 1968 following the breakup of Goble's first band The Silence. Their first public performance took place at Port Noarlunga's Teen Scene Club on 16 November 1968.

In a short lifespan of ten months, the band completed 83 performances. This included nine television appearances, on programs such as Adelaide Tonight, Today-Tonight (ABC Television) and In Time.

=== Hoadley's Battle of the Sounds ===
Hoadley's Battle of the Sounds was a prestigious Australian national band contest held annually from 1966 to 1972. The winning band received a cash prize and international travel. Winners included The Twilights, The Groop, Doug Parkinson In Focus, The Flying Circus and Sherbet.

1969 was the peak year of the contest, with over 1000 bands competing. For the only time, there were two categories: bands and vocal groups. The prize for each category was identical.

Travis Wellington Hedge entered the vocal groups category and, on 11 July 1969 at the South Australian Final, won the right to represent the state at the national final. One month later, on 10 August 1969, the band finished third at the National Final, losing to Sydney band The Affair featuring Kerrie Biddell.

== Recording ==
In 1969, Travis Wellington Hedge recorded a single for the RCA Australia label. The A-side was a cover of The Beatles' Yellow Submarine track "Hey Bulldog", while the B-side covered Screamin' Jay Hawkins' song "I Put a Spell on You".

"Hey Bulldog" subsequently reappeared as track 16 on the "psychotropic" compilation Datura Dreamtime. (Coincidentally, Datura Dreamtime is an interesting precursor to the internationally famous Little River Band (LRB). Other album tracks feature Goble's future LRB bandmates: Glenn Shorrock with The Twilights and Beeb Birtles with Zoot, as well as Goble's next band Allison Gros.)

== Breakup ==
Travis Wellington Hedge broke up towards the end of 1969. Their last performance was held at Adelaide's Princeton Club on 25 October 1969.

Graeham Goble, Shane Simon and Rob Leedham went on to form a new band, Allison Gros, later known as Mississippi.
