= No Reins =

Studio album by Little River Band
- Released: May 1986
- Recorded: 1985–1986
- Genre: Rock
- Length: 48:42
- Label: Capitol
- Producer: Richard Dodd, Little River Band

Little River Band chronology
Playing to Win (1984)	No Reins (1986)	Monsoon (1988)

Singles from No Reins
- 1. "No Reins On Me" Released: July 1986 (Australia only); 2. "Time for Us" Released: August 1986 (Internationally only); 3. "Face in the Crowd" Released: October 1986; 4. "When the War Is Over" Released: December 1986

No Reins is the ninth studio album by Australian group Little River Band. No Reins was released in May 1986 and peaked at number 85 on the Kent Music Report Albums Chart. It was the band's last studio album with John Farnham on lead vocals.

In 1997, the CD was re-released on One Way Records with two bonus tracks.

== Track listing ==
1. "Face in the Crowd" (G. Goble) - 4:38
2. "It's Just a Matter of Time" (G. Goble) - 4:47
3. "Time for Us" (G. Goble, W. Nelson, D. Scheibner) - 4:42
4. "No Reins on Me" (G. Goble) - 4:37
5. "When the War Is Over" (S. Prestwich) - 5:09
6. "Thin Ice" (G. Goble, W. Nelson) - 4:27
7. "How Many Nights" (G. Goble) - 4:35
8. "Forever Blue" (Stephen Edward Foster, G. Goble) - 5:06
9. "Paper Paradise" (D. Hirschfelder, W. Nelson) - 4:10
10. "It Was the Night" (G. Goble) - 5:57

Bonus CD tracks

1. "Netherlands" (B. Birtles) - 3:35
2. "St. Louis" (H. Vanda, G. Young) - 4:15

== Personnel ==
Little River Band:

- John Farnham – lead vocals, backing vocals
- Graham Goble – guitar, backing vocals
- David Hirschfelder – keyboards, backing vocals
- Stephen Housden – lead guitar
- Wayne Nelson – bass guitar, backing vocals, lead vocals
- Steven Prestwich – drums

== Charts ==
Chart (1986)	Peak position
Australia (Kent Music Report)	85
