= Stylus (band) =

Australian blue-eyed soul group

- Origin: Melbourne, Victoria, Australia
- Genres: Funk, blue-eyed soul
- Years active: 1975–1979, 2001–2002, 2009–2012
- Labels: WEA, Crystal Clear, Oz, EMI, Motown/Prodigal, Empire, Vivid Japan/Zoom
- Past members: Peter Cupples; Ashley Henderson; Peter Lee; Sam McNally; Ronnie Peers; Trevor Courtney; Joe Tattersalls; Peter Roberts; Mark Meyers; David Jones; Gerry Pantazis

Stylus were an Australian blue-eyed soul group formed in 1975. They were the only Australian act to be released by Motown Records in the United States. Stylus toured supporting George Benson, Average White Band, Ike & Tina Turner, and Little River Band. According to rock music historian, Ian McFarlane, Stylus "scored a number of hit singles and became very popular on the Australian pub and concert circuit". The group disbanded in 1979 and subsequently had various reunions. In 1998-99 Japan's Toshiba-EMI re-issued three Stylus albums on CDs (For the Love of Music, Best Kept Secret and Part of It All). Their reunions have resulted in a live album, Still Alive (2003); and a new studio album, Across Time (2010).

== History ==
Stylus developed from Mason's Cure, which were a Melbourne-based group, led by Ian Mason on keyboards, and included at various stages Peter Cupples (ex-Wheatfield, Canyon), Ashley Henderson, Peter Lee, Ronnie Peers and Ian Tomney. In early 1975 that group issued a single, "Let Me Love You Right", but Mason left to join The Bootleg Band. The remaining members became Stylus with Cupples on lead vocals, guitar (electric and acoustic), congas, percussion and electric piano; Henderson on bass guitar, lead and backing vocals; Lee on drums and percussion; Peers on lead guitar (electric and acoustic); and new member, Sam McNally (ex-Silver Sun, Baiyana) on keyboards: fender electric piano, acoustic piano, moog synthesiser and clavinet;. The group supported tours by Focus, Ike and Tina Turner, and Sherbet.

Stylus were signed to WEA and, in June 1975, released their debut single, "Summer Breeze", which was a cover version of Seals & Croft's 1972 song. The Stylus version reached the top 60 of the Kent Music Report Singles Chart. Their second single, "World of Make Believe", appeared in October which peaked into the top 40. It was followed, in November, by their debut album, Where in the World?, which was recorded at Armstrong Audio Video in Melbourne for Atlantic Records. In April 1976 the album provided a third single, "I'm Going Home", but Stylus had left WEA.

Their next single, "So Much Love", was issued in June 1976 on Crystal Clear Records, which reached the top 50. The group signed with the Oz label, run by Ross Wilson and Glenn Wheatley, and distributed by EMI. Their second album, For the Love of Music, was released in October that year, which was produced by Trevor Courtney and Cupples. It included their next single, "I Just Don't Wanna Fall in Love Right Now", which reached the top 100. By that time Courtney (ex-Vibrants, Skylight) had temporarily replaced Lee on drums, and was replaced in turn by Joe Tattersall (Ayers Rock) by the end of that year.

With Courtney on drums, Stylus had recorded the group's third album, Best Kept Secret, which appeared in April 1978. It provided three more singles, "Workout Fine" (March 1978), "Look at Me" (July) and "Got to Say Goodbye" (November). The group signed with Motown Records to re-issue Best Kept Secret as Stylus, in the United Kingdom and United States, on their Prodigal imprint. The album and its related singles received favourable reviews in music industry magazines, Cashbox and Billboard. By mid-1978 Peter Roberts (ex-Ride Band) had joined on co-lead vocals and then Mark Meyer (Sailor) replaced Tattersall on drums. Prodigal was shelved by Motown in 1979, disrupting the Stylus-Motown relationship, just as tours with Hall & Oates and Earth Wind & Fire were proposed. Stylus supported George Benson on his Australian tour. In August 1979 the band issued their fourth album, Part of It All, and the related single, "If You Believe in Me". The group disbanded later that year. Part of It All was to be their second US release but this was also shelved. EMI Records in Australia were not committed to the band despite the US interest.

=== Afterwards and reunions ===
Various Stylus members pursued separate careers after the group had disbanded. By 1980 Cupples had formed the first version of Peter Cupples Band with Virgil Donati (ex-Taste) on drums; David Hirschfelder on keyboards; Ross Ingliss on guitar; and Robert Little on bass guitar. In October 1981 he issued his debut solo album, Fear of Thunder, on the Full Moon label for Astor Records. He also appeared on TV variety shows and worked on the cabaret circuit. In 1980 McNally joined John Farnham Band, by February 1982 he issued his solo album, First Chance. He toured with various bands and worked as a session musician.

In 1998-99 Toshiba-EMI in Japan released the Stylus back catalogue on CD – which had not appeared in that format in Australia. Late in 2001 Stylus reunited with the line-up of Cupples, Henderson, McNally, and Peers joined by David Jones on drums. Live recordings from their 2002 tour were issued as Still Alive in 2003 on Empire Records.

In 2009, Toshiba-EMI requested a new studio album from Stylus, they had established a relationship with the band following the re-release of the original catalogue. On 23 June 2010 the album, Across Time, was released in Japan – the first one of new material in 31 years – on Vivid Japan/Zoom. The line-up were Cupples, Henderson, McNally and Peers with Gerry Pantazis on drums and percussion. Late in 2012 Stylus performed shows in Melbourne, Sydney and Newcastle; their first since 2002.

== Discography ==
=== Studio albums ===
List of studio albums, with selected details and chart positions
Title	Album details	Peak chart positions
Title	Album details	AUS
Where in the World	Released: October 1975; Label: Atlantic (600024)	25
For the Love of Music	Released: October 1976; Label: OZ Records (OZS 1002)	70
The Best Kept Secret (Released as Stylus in the US)	Released: April 1978; Label: OZ Records (OZS 1008), Prodigal Records (P7-10030R1)	70
Part of It All	Released: August 1979; Label: OZ Records (OZS 1012)	91
Across Time	Released: 23 June 2010; Label: PDC Music (VSCD3373)	—

=== Live albums ===
List of live albums, with selected details
Title	Details
Still Alive	Released: 2003; Label: Empire (52CD291)

=== Compilation albums ===
List of compilation albums, with selected details
Title	Details
The Stylus Collection	Released: 1992; Label: EMI Music Australia (4321282)

=== Singles ===
List of singles, with selected chart positions
Title	Year	Peak chart positions	Album
Title	Year	AUS	Album
"Summer Breeze"	1975	58	Where in the World
"World of Make Believe"	1975	34	Where in the World
"I'm Going Home"	1976	—	Where in the World
"So Much Love"	1976	44	For the Love of Music
"I Just Don't Wanna Fall in Love Right Now"	1976	83	For the Love of Music
"Kissin'"	1977	—	The Best Kept Secret
"Workout Fine"	1978	64	The Best Kept Secret
"Look at Me"	1978	—	The Best Kept Secret
"Got to Say Goodbye"	1978	—	Non-album single
"If You Believe in Me"	1979	—	Part of It All
