= Forever Blue (song) =

1988 single by Little River Band

Single by Little River Band

from the album No Reins
- B-side: "Help Is on Its Way"
- Released: July 1995
- Length: 5:05
- Label: Capitol
- Songwriter(s): Steve Foster, Graham Goble
- Producer(s): Richard Dodd, Little River Band

Little River Band singles chronology
""Worldwide Love"" (1991)	"Forever Blue" (1995)

"Forever Blue" is a song by Australian band Little River Band, released in May 1986 on the group's ninth studio album, No Reins. The song was written by Steve Foster and Graham Goble. It was subsequently released as a single in The Netherlands in July 1995 after frequent radio airplay by local DJs. It peaked at number 12 on Dutch Charts.

== Track listing ==
Netherlands 7" (Capitol 7243 8 720842 1)

Side A. "Forever Blue" – 5:05
Side B. "Help Is on Its Way" – 4:06

== Charts ==
Chart performance for "Forever Blue"
Chart (1995)	Peak position
Netherlands (Dutch Charts)	12
