= Dave Orams =

New Zealand bass guitarist and vocalist

David Orams is a New Zealand bass guitarist and vocalist. He was, briefly, the first bassist with Little River Band in 1975. He was replaced by Roger McLachlan before the band started to tour and record.

Orams was a member of numerous other bands, including Bari and The Breakaways (1964–67), Bitter End (1967) and Quincy Conserve (1967–73).
