= Masterpieces (Little River Band album) =

Compilation album by Little River Band
- Released: 14 October 2022
- Recorded: 1975–2003
- Label: EMI
- Producer: Little River Band

Little River Band chronology
Ultimate Hits (2022)	Masterpieces (2022)

Masterpieces is a compilation by Australian rock group Little River Band, released on 14 October 2022. It comprises band and fan favourite songs not released as singles. All songs were remastered for this release. The album debuted at number 75 on the ARIA Charts.

== Track listing ==
CD1

1. "My Lady and Me" – 5:16
2. "Days On the Road" – 5:23
3. "Broke Again" – 3:28
4. "Seine City" – 3:47
5. "Another Runway" – 6:32
6. "Raelene, Raelene" – 4:32
7. "Fall from Paradise" – 5:06
8. "Light of Day" – 8:04
9. "By My Side" – 4:28
10. "Hard Life" (Prelude) – 2:46
11. "Hard Life" – 4:50
12. "Middle Man" – 4:29
13. "Mistress of Mine" – 5:16

CD2

1. "Just Say That You Love Me" – 4:02
2. "Don't Let The Needle Win" – 3:39
3. "Mr. Socialite" – 5:26
4. "Sleepless Nights" – 5:17
5. "Easy Money" – 4:01
6. "I Know It" – 3:22
7. "Love Letters" – 3:08
8. "Blind Eyes" – 5:02
9. "No Reins On Me" – 4:41
10. "How Many Nights? " – 4:38
11. "When the War Is Over" – 5:13
12. "Face in the Crowd" – 4:48
13. "Full Circle" – 1:58

== Charts ==
Chart performance for Masterpieces
Chart (2022)	Peak position
Australian Albums (ARIA)	75

== Release history ==
Country	Date	Label	Format	Catalogue	Reference
Australia	14 October 2022	EMI Music	2×CD, digital download	5396749	
Australia	14 October 2022	EMI Music	3×LP	5396753	
