= Down on the Border =

Single by Little River Band

from the album Greatest Hits
- B-side: "No More Tears"
- Released: July 1982
- Recorded: 1982
- Genre: Rock
- Length: 2:40
- Label: Capitol Records
- Songwriter(s): Graeham Goble
- Producer(s): Little River Band and Ern Rose

Little River Band singles chronology
"Take It Easy on Me" (1982)	"Down on the Border" (1982)	"St Louis" (1982)

"Down on the Border" is a song by Australian soft rock band Little River Band, written by Graham Goble. It was released in July 1982 as the first single from the band's 1982 Greatest Hits album. The song also introduced the band's new lead vocalist, John Farnham, who replaced Glenn Shorrock.

"Down on the Border" peaked at number 7 on the Australian Kent Music Report singles chart.

As this was Little River Band's first release with Farnham as lead singer, they performed the song on several popular television programs, including The Paul Hogan Show, Hey Hey It's Saturday and Countdown. The band also released an official music video which dramatized lyrics from the song.

Farnham continued to feature the song in his set list after leaving Little River Band to re-establish his solo career.

== Track listings ==
Australian 7" (Capitol Records – CP-785)
A. "Down on the Border" - 2:40
B. "No More Tears" - 3:27

New Zealand 7" (Capitol Records – CP 637)
A. "Down on the Border" - 2:49
B. "No More Tears" - 3:27
