= Sleeper Catcher =

Studio album by Little River Band
- Released: May 1978
- Studio: Armstrong Studios South Melbourne.
- Genre: Soft rock
- Label: EMI
- Producers: John Boylan, Little River Band

Little River Band chronology
Diamantina Cocktail (1977)	Sleeper Catcher (1978)	It's a Long Way There (Greatest Hits) (1978)

Singles from Sleeper Catcher
- 1. "Shut Down Turn Off" Released: March 1978; 2. "Reminiscing" Released: June 1978; 3. "Lady" Released: September 1978

Professional ratings
Review scores
Source	Rating
AllMusic	4.5/5 stars
Christgau's Record Guide	C−
The Rolling Stone Album Guide	2.5/5 stars

Sleeper Catcher is the fourth studio album by the Little River Band, released in May 1978. It peaked at No. 4 on the Australian Kent Music Report Albums Chart and No. 16 on the Billboard 200. The album was certified Platinum by the RIAA in May 1979.

At the Australian 1978 King of Pop Awards the album won Most Popular Australian Album.

The band is shown on the cover of the album playing the Australian gambling game two-up, and the Sleeper Catcher is a participant who retrieves bets left behind by a tardy gambler in the game.

It was the band's last album to feature George McArdle on bass.

== Track listing ==
=== Australian version ===
Side A

1. "Fall from Paradise" (Beeb Birtles/Graham Goble) - 3:59
2. "Lady" (Goble) - 4:50
3. "Red-Headed Wild Flower" (Birtles/Ed Nimmervoll) - 4:35
4. "Light of Day" (Birtles) - 8:03

Side B

1. "So Many Paths" (Glenn Shorrock/Idris Jones) - 4:24
2. "Reminiscing" (Goble) - 4:13
3. "Sanity's Side" (Shorrock/Chris Dawes) - 4:14
4. "Shut Down Turn Off" (Shorrock) - 3:51
5. "One for the Road" (Birtles/Goble) - 4:01

=== American version ===
Side A

1. "Shut Down Turn Off" (Shorrock) - 3:51
2. "Reminiscing" (Goble) - 4:13
3. "Red-Headed Wild Flower" (Birtles/Nimmervoll) - 4:35
4. "Light of Day" (Birtles) - 8:03

Side B

1. "Fall from Paradise" (Birtles/Goble) - 3:59
2. "Lady" (Goble) - 4:50
3. "Sanity's Side" (Shorrock/Dawes) - 4:14
4. "So Many Paths" (Shorrock/Jones) - 4:24
5. "One for the Road" (Birtles/Goble) - 4:01

Bonus tracks in the 1996 reissue

10. "Take Me Home" (Birtles) - 3:49
11. "Changed and Different" (Goble) - 4:02

Bonus track on the 2022 remaster

10. "Recordando" (Goble) - 4:12

== Personnel ==
- Glenn Shorrock - lead vocals
- David Briggs - lead and Roland synthesizer guitars
- Beeb Birtles - electric and acoustic guitars, vocals
- Graham Goble - electric and acoustic guitars, vocals, vocal arrangements
- George McArdle - bass
- Derek Pellicci - Sonor and Syndrums drums, percussion

Additional musicians

- Vernon Hill - flute
- Bob Venier - flugelhorn
- Pam Raines - harp
- Peter Sullivan - electric and acoustic pianos
- Peter Jones - electric piano (2)
- Mal Logan - Hammond organ
- Ric Formosa - conductor, orchestral arrangements

== Charts ==
=== Weekly charts ===
Chart (1978/79)	Peak position
Australia (Kent Music Report)	4
Canada Top Albums/CDs (RPM)	16
New Zealand Albums (RMNZ)	12
US Billboard 200	16

=== Year-end charts ===
Chart (1978)	Position
Australia (Kent Music Report)	18
Canada Top Albums/CDs (RPM)	96
US Billboard 200	92
Chart (1979)	Position
US Billboard 200	66

== Certifications ==
Region	Certification	Certified units/sales
Australia (ARIA)	2× Platinum	100,000^{^}
United States (RIAA)	Platinum	1,000,000^{^}
^{^} Shipments figures based on certification alone.
