= The Other Guy (song) =

- North American 7" picture sleeve

Single by Little River Band

from the album Greatest Hits
- B-side: "No More Tears"
- Released: February 1983
- Recorded: 1982
- Genre: Soft rock
- Length: 2:49
- Label: Capitol Records
- Songwriter: Graeham Goble
- Producers: Little River Band and Ern Rose

Little River Band singles chronology
"St. Louis" (1982)	"The Other Guy" (1983)	"We Two" (1983)

"The Other Guy" is a song by Australian soft rock band Little River Band. It was released in February 1983 as the third and final single from the band's 1982 Greatest Hits album. The song also featured the band's new lead vocalist, John Farnham, who replaced Glenn Shorrock.

"The Other Guy" peaked at number 18 on the Australian Kent Music Report singles chart. It peaked at number 11 on the U.S. Billboard Hot 100 and number eight on the Cash Box Top 100.

Billboard said it has "a chunkier rhythm and more punch than their characteristic smooth sound, but the vocals are instantly recognizable."

== Track listings ==
Australian 7" (Capitol Records – CP-918)
A. "The Other Guy" - 2:53
B. "Take It Easy on Me" (Live) - 3:45

New Zealand 7" (Capitol Records – F 5185)
A. "The Other Guy" - 2:49
B. "No More Tears" - 3:27

North America 7" (Capitol Records – B-5185)
A. "The Other Guy" - 2:49
B. "No More Tears" - 3:27

== Charts ==
=== Weekly charts ===
Chart (1983)	Peak position
Australia (Kent Music Report)	18
Canada Top Singles (RPM)	30
Canada Adult Contemporary (RPM)	16
New Zealand (Recorded Music NZ)	2
U.S. Billboard Hot 100	11
U.S. Adult Contemporary (Billboard)	6
U.S. Cash Box Top 100 Singles	8

=== Year-end charts ===
Chart (1983)	position
New Zealand (Recorded Music NZ)	43
U.S. Billboard Hot 100	65
U.S. Cash Box	56

== Certifications ==
Region	Certification	Certified units/sales
New Zealand (RMNZ)	Platinum	30,000^{‡}
^{‡} Sales+streaming figures based on certification alone.

== Cover versions ==
A cover by David Slater, released in 1988 as the second single from his debut album Exchange of Hearts, reached No. 30 on the Billboard Billboard Hot Country Singles chart.
