= Man on Your Mind =

1982 single by Little River Band

- North American 7" picture sleeve

Single by Little River Band

from the album Time Exposure
- B-side: "Love Will Survive"/"Orbit Zero"
- Released: March 1982
- Recorded: 1981
- Genre: Rock
- Length: 4:05 (single version); 4:16 (album version)
- Label: Capitol Records
- Songwriters: Glenn Shorrock; Kerryn Tolhurst
- Producer: George Martin

Little River Band singles chronology
"Take It Easy on Me" (1981)	"Man on Your Mind" (1982)	"Down on the Border" (1982)

"Man on Your Mind" is a song by Australian rock band Little River Band. It was released in March 1982 as the third single from their sixth studio album, Time Exposure. "Man on Your Mind" peaked at No. 14 on the US Billboard Hot 100. The song is featured in the Sean Penn movie Bad Boys.

== Track listings ==
Australian 7" (Capitol Records – CP-633)
A. "Man on Your Mind" - 4:05
B. "Love Will Survive" - 4:38

New Zealand 7" (Capitol Records – F 5061)
A. "Man on Your Mind" - 4:05
B. "Orbit Zero" - 4:28

North American 7" (Capitol Records – B-5061)
A. "Man on Your Mind" - 4:05
B. "Orbit Zero" - 4:28

== Charts ==
=== Weekly charts ===
Chart (1981–1982)	Peak position
Canada Top Singles (RPM)	37
U.S. Billboard Hot 100	14
U.S. Adult Contemporary (Billboard)	26
U.S. Top 100 Singles (Cash Box)	13

=== Year-end charts ===
Chart (1982)	Position
U.S. Billboard Hot 100	92
U.S. Top 100 Singles (Cash Box)	81
