= Shut Down Turn Off =

1978 single by Little River Band

- Dutch picture sleeve

Single by Little River Band

from the album Sleeper Catcher
- B-side: "Days On the Road"
- Released: March 1978
- Genre: Soft rock
- Length: 3:54
- Label: EMI Music
- Songwriter: Glenn Shorrock
- Producers: Little River Band, John Boylan

Little River Band singles chronology
"Happy Anniversary" (1977)	"Shut Down Turn Off" (1978)	"Reminiscing" (1978)

"Shut Down Turn Off" is a song by Australian band Little River Band, released in March 1978 as the lead single from the group's fourth studio album, Sleeper Catcher. The song peaked at number 16 on the Australian charts.

== Track listing ==
Australian 7" (EMI 11691)
Side A. "Shut Down Turn Off" - 3:54
Side B. "Days On the Road" (Live from Rainbow Theatre, London.) - 5:17

== Charts ==
Chart (1978)	Peak position
Australia (Kent Music Report)	16
