= The Night Owls (song) =

- European 7" picture sleeve

Single by Little River Band

from the album Time Exposure
- B-side: "Suicide Boulevard"
- Released: September 1981
- Genre: Rock; AOR
- Length: 3:45 (single version); 5:19 (album version)
- Label: Capitol Records
- Songwriter: Graeham Goble
- Producer: George Martin

Little River Band singles chronology
"Long Jumping Jeweller" (1981)	"The Night Owls" (1981)	"Take It Easy on Me" (1981)

"The Night Owls" is a song by Australian rock band Little River Band. It was released in September 1981 as the lead single from their sixth studio album Time Exposure. It is the first song to feature new bassist Wayne Nelson on vocals.

"The Night Owls" peaked at number 18 on the Australian Kent Music Report singles chart and at number 6 on the US Billboard Hot 100.

== Track listings ==
Australian 7" (Capitol Records – CP-570)
A. "The Night Owls" - 3:45
B. "Suicide Boulevard" - 3:23

North American 7" (Capitol Records – A-5033)
A. "The Night Owls" - 3:45
B. "Suicide Boulevard" - 3:23

Spanish version (Capitol Records – 10C 006-086.414)
A. "La Noche de los Buhos" - 3:55
B. "Boulevard del Suicidio" - 4:11

== Charts ==
Chart (1981)	Peak position
Australia (Kent Music Report)	18
Canada Top Singles (RPM)	16
New Zealand (Recorded Music NZ)	46
U.S. (Billboard Hot 100)	6
U.S. (Easy Listening)	33
US (Top Rock Tracks)	9
