= Lady (Little River Band song) =

- North American 7" picture sleeve

Single by Little River Band

from the album Sleeper Catcher
- B-side: "Happy Anniversary"/"Take Me Home"
- Released: September 1978
- Recorded: 1978
- Genre: Pop rock, soft rock
- Length: 3:31 (single version); 4:50 (album version)
- Label: EMI (Australia); Harvest (US/Canada)
- Songwriter: Graeham Goble
- Producers: John Boylan, Little River Band

Little River Band singles chronology
| "Reminiscing" (1978) | "Lady" (1978) | "Lonesome Loser" (1979) |

"Lady" is a song written by Graeham Goble and performed by Australian rock music group Little River Band. It was released in September 1978 as the third and final single from their fourth studio album, Sleeper Catcher. The song peaked at number 46 on the Australian Kent Music Report singles chart. The song also peaked at No. 10 on the Billboard Hot 100 in April 1979.

== Background ==
Goble has recounted his inspiration for this song on many occasions: "A girl (I never met) inspired "Lady" when she danced in front of [previous band] Mississippi at the Matthew Flinders Hotel, Melbourne in 1973." Lead singer Glenn Shorrock did not like the song, so it was not recorded until they needed one more song for Sleeper Catcher.

== Track listings ==
Australian 7" (EMI 11800)
A. "Lady" - 3:31
B. "Happy Anniversary"

New Zealand 7" (EMI 1036)
A. "Lady" - 3:31
B. "So Many Paths" - 5:07

North American 7" (Harvest 4667)
A. "Lady" - 3:31
B. "So Many Paths" - 5:07

Spanish version (OZ Records 10C 006-082647)
A. "Señorita" - 3:55
B. "Recordando" - 4:11

== Charts ==
=== Weekly charts ===
| Chart (1978/1979) | Peak position |
|---|---|
| Australia (Kent Music Report) | 46 |
| Canada (RPM Top Singles) | 29 |
| Canada (RPM Adult Contemporary) | 4 |
| New Zealand (Recorded Music NZ) | 28 |
| U.S. (Billboard Hot 100) | 10 |
| U.S. (Easy Listening) | 7 |
| U.S. (Cash Box) | 10 |

=== Year-end charts ===
| Chart (1979) | Rank |
|---|---|
| Canada (RPM Adult Contemporary) | 70 |
| U.S. (Billboard Hot 100) | 42 |
| U.S. (Cash Box) | 78 |
