= Little River Band =

Australian rock band

- The 1976–1978 lineup of Little River Band (L–R): Graeham Goble, Beeb Birtles, George McArdle, Glenn Shorrock, David Briggs; (front): Derek Pellicci

Background information
- Origin: Melbourne, Victoria, Australia
- Genres: Rock; AOR; pop rock; soft rock
- Years active: 1975–present
- Labels: EMI; Harvest; Capitol; WEA; MCA; Frontiers; Westwood One; London Wavelength
- Spinoff of: Mississippi
- Members: Wayne Nelson; Chris Marion; Ryan Ricks; Colin Whinnery; Bruce Wallace
- Past members: See Band personnel
- Website: littleriverband.com

Little River Band (LRB) are a rock band formed in Melbourne, Australia, in March 1975. The band achieved commercial success in both Australia and the United States. They have sold more than 30 million records; six studio albums reached the top 10 on the Australian Kent Music Report albums chart including Diamantina Cocktail (April 1977) and First Under the Wire (July 1979), which both peaked at No. 2. Nine singles appeared in the top 20 on the related singles chart, with "Help Is on Its Way" (1977) as their only number-one hit. Ten singles reached the top 20 on the Billboard Hot 100 with "Reminiscing" their highest, peaking at No. 3.

Little River Band have received many music awards in Australia. The 1976 line-up of Glenn Shorrock, Graeham Goble, Beeb Birtles, George McArdle, David Briggs and Derek Pellicci were inducted into the Australian Recording Industry Association (ARIA) hall of fame at the 18th annual ARIA Music Awards of 2004. Most of the group's 1970s and 1980s material was written by Goble and/or Shorrock, Birtles and Briggs. In May 2001 the Australasian Performing Right Association (APRA), as part of its 75th anniversary celebrations, named "Cool Change", written by Shorrock, as one of the Top 30 Australian songs of all time. "Reminiscing", written by Goble, received a 5-Million Broadcast Citation from BMI in 2020.

The group have undergone numerous personnel changes, having had over 30 members since their formation, including John Farnham as lead singer after Shorrock first departed in 1982. None of the musicians now performing as Little River Band are original members, nor were they members in the 1970s. In the 1980s, members included Farnham, Wayne Nelson, Stephen Housden, David Hirschfelder and Steve Prestwich. The current line-up is Nelson, Chris Marion, Ryan Ricks, Colin Whinnery and Bruce Wallace, none of whom are Australian. Various legal disputes over the band's name occurred in the 2000s, with Housden filing suit against Birtles, Goble and Shorrock.

== History ==
=== 1970–1974: Pre Little River Band ===
Little River Band formed in March 1975 in Melbourne as a harmony rock group with Beeb Birtles on guitar and vocals, Graham Davidge on lead guitar, Graeham Goble on guitar and vocals, Dave Orams on bass guitar, Derek Pellicci on drums and Glenn Shorrock on lead vocals. Upon formation they were an Australian super group, with Birtles, Goble, Pellicci and Shorrock each from prominent local bands. Birtles had been the bass guitarist and vocalist in the pop-rock band Zoot (which launched the career of singer-guitarist Rick Springfield) from 1967 to 1971.

Goble had led Adelaide-formed folk rock group Allison Gros in 1970. They relocated to Melbourne and in 1972 were renamed as Mississippi, a harmony country rock band which, later that year, Birtles joined on guitar and vocals and Pellicci on drums. They had chart success in Australia and built up a following on the concert and festival circuit. During 1971 to 1972, the original members of Mississippi had also recorded as a studio band under the pseudonym Drummond. They achieved a number-one hit, for eight consecutive weeks, on the Go-Set National Top 40 with a novelty cover version of the Rays' song "Daddy Cool".

Shorrock had been the lead singer of a pop band, the Twilights (1964–69), and a country rock group, Axiom, from 1969 to 1971 (alongside singer-songwriter Brian Cadd). Both Axiom and Mississippi had relocated to the United Kingdom to try to break into the local record market, but without success. Axiom disbanded after moving to the UK, and Shorrock sang for a more progressive rock outfit, Esperanto, in 1973. He also provided backing vocals for Cliff Richard.

In late 1974, Birtles, Goble and Pellicci met with talent manager Glenn Wheatley (former bass player of the Masters Apprentices) in London, with a view to forming a new band. After auditioning Peter Doyle as lead singer, they settled on Shorrock. With Wheatley as manager, Birtles, Goble, Pellicci and Shorrock agreed to reconvene in Melbourne in early 1975. Due to the indifferent reception they had each received in the UK, they decided their new band would establish itself in the United States. Wheatley's first-hand experiences of the rip-offs in the 1960s music scene, combined with working in music management in the UK and the US in the early 1970s, allowed him to help the Little River Band become the first Australian group to enjoy consistent commercial and chart success in the US.

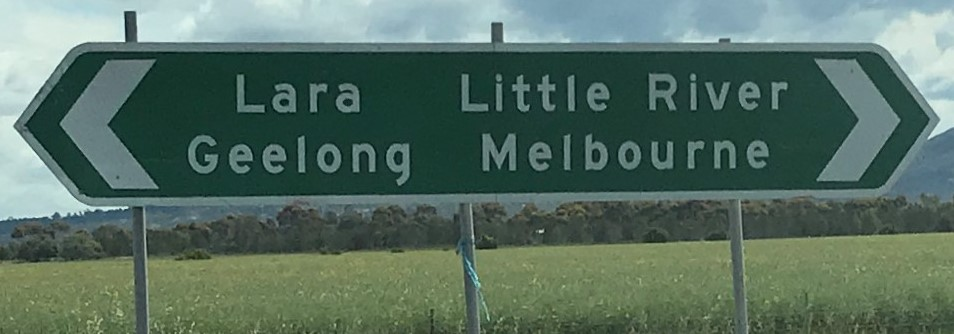
A road sign to Little River, on a trip by the fledgling band from Melbourne to Geelong, inspired Glenn Shorrock to suggest the band name

After their return to Australia, the members began rehearsing in February 1975, still using the name of Mississippi. On 20 March 1975, they played their first official gig at Martini's Hotel in Carlton. In Birtles' autobiography, Every Day of My Life, he explains how the band came to change its name:

[Shorrock] and I were sitting in the back seat of a car driving down Princes Highway to play a gig at The Golf View Hotel in Geelong. As we passed the Little River exit sign, [Shorrock] said "Little River, that'd be a good song title." Within a split second he said, "Hey, what about Little River Band?" We all agreed it was the perfect name for us.

Little River Band (as Mississippi) had recorded their first track, a cover version of the Everly Brothers' song "When Will I Be Loved", in February 1975, at Armstrong Studios. However, Linda Ronstadt's version appeared in the following month, so LRB did not release theirs. Before the group performed, Graham Davidge was replaced by Ric Formosa on guitar, and Dave Orams by Roger McLachlan (ex-Levi Smith's Clefs) on bass guitar and backing vocals. Phil Manning (ex-Chain) was LRB's first choice for lead guitar. Manning was busy with his solo career and recommended Formosa. The latter, who had travelled to Australia from Canada and was working in a music store, joined soon after.

=== 1975–1976: early years ===
In May 1975 they signed with EMI Records and started recording their debut self-titled album at Armstrong Studios in the following month. The album was co-produced by Birtles, Goble, Shorrock and Wheatley. Tony Catterall of The Canberra Times described it in November as "one of those flawed creations that inevitably draws a more-in-sorrow-than-in-anger response." Bruce Eder of AllMusic observed, "[it's] an astonishingly strong debut album." Little River Band peaked at No. 17 on the Kent Music Report Albums Chart and was certified gold in early 1976. Their debut single, "Curiosity (Killed the Cat)", was released in September, reaching No. 15 on the related Kent Music Report Singles Chart. Two more singles followed, "Emma" and "It's a Long Way There".

Wheatley travelled to Los Angeles in December 1975 and touted the group to various record companies until Rupert Perry of Capitol Records signed them on Christmas Eve. Little River Band issued their second Australian album, After Hours, in April 1976. It was produced by the band but was not issued in the US until 1980. After Hours peaked at No. 5 and provided the single "Everyday of My Life", in May 1976, which reached the top 30.

=== 1976–1982: success and changes of personnel ===
During August 1976 both Formosa and McLachlan were replaced. David Briggs joined on guitar (ex-Cycle, the Avengers, Ram Band) and George McArdle on bass guitar (also ex-Ram Band). According to Wheatley, Formosa was not enthusiastic about touring outside of Australia and left to work as a session musician, composer and arranger. The group had also decided to bring in McArdle to replace McLachlan, who also became a sessions player and joined the country rock group Stars in 1976. Australian music journalist Ed Nimmervoll listed the classic line-up of the band as Birtles, Briggs, Goble, McArdle, Pellicci and Shorrock. Formosa still worked with LRB by arranging and writing string parts for several tracks on subsequent albums.

Encouraged by their Australian success, they undertook their first international tour. They flew to the UK in September 1976 to play a show in London's Hyde Park supporting Queen. They then opened shows in the rest of Europe for the Hollies during September and October. Birtles advised fellow Australian bands to establish themselves in Australia first before trying the UK market. In October they performed their first US concert, at James Madison University (then called Madison College) in Harrisonburg, Virginia, as the opening act for Average White Band. Due to US appearances and support from FM stations, "It's a Long Way There" reached No. 28 on the Billboard Hot 100.

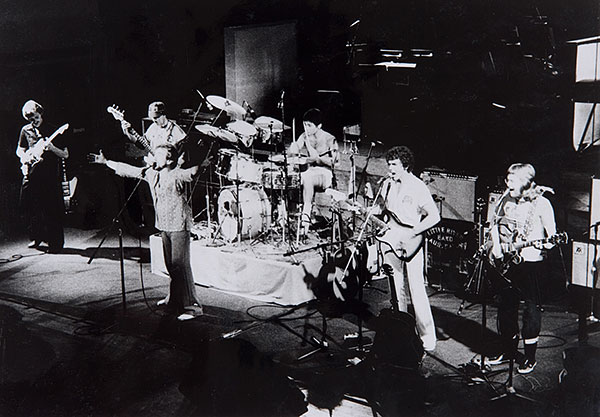
Little River Band performing in 1977 (left to right): Briggs, McArdle, Shorrock, Pellicci, Birtles and Goble (Pic: Ian Hood and Paul Temple)

Little River Band's second album, After Hours, had been passed over in the US by Capitol. The label selected tracks from it and from their third Australian release, Diamantina Cocktail (April 1977), to create Capitol's second US album, also titled Diamantina Cocktail (May 1977). The Australian version was co-produced by the group with John Boylan – who stayed on to co-produce their next two studio albums. Due to tension between band members, Birtles, Goble and Shorrock recorded as much of their parts individually as was feasible.

The Canberra Times' Julie Meldrum caught their local performance in May 1977 and described the band as "tightly disciplined" and "there was nothing that was not world class". She reviewed the album, which had no Australian references and felt they were aiming at the US West Coast scene with influences from David Crosby, Graham Nash and Little Feat apparent. Stephen Thomas Erlewine of AllMusic commented on the US release, "laidback, sweet country-rock, [it] has a similar sound to the band's debut, but the melodies are a little sharper and catchier, making [it] a better, more fully-rounded collection".

In Australia, Diamantina Cocktail became their highest charting album, peaking at No. 2; while the US version reached the top 50 on the Billboard 200. In January 1978 it was certified gold by RIAA for sales of 500,000 copies: the first Australian band to do so. The lead single, "Help Is on Its Way" reached No. 1 in Australia. Both it and the fourth single, "Happy Anniversary", peaked in the top 20 on the Billboard Hot 100.

During 1977 they consistently toured, mostly in the US, headlining in smaller venues and appearing in stadiums on multi-billed shows supporting the Doobie Brothers, Supertramp, America and Jimmy Buffett. In August they co-headlined day two of the Reading Music Festival in the UK alongside Thin Lizzy. In November they supported Fleetwood Mac and Santana at Rockarena concerts in Sydney and Melbourne.

Early in 1978, Little River Band performed a free concert on the steps of the Sydney Opera House, drawing 80,000 people and topping the previous record of 57,000 set by Fleetwood Mac and Little River Band on their previous Australian tour.

Their fourth studio album, Sleeper Catcher, was released in May 1978 and peaked at No. 4 in Australia and No. 16 in the US. By May of the following year, it was certified platinum by RIAA for sales of 1,000,000 copies: the first Australian-recorded album to achieve that feat. AllMusic's Mike DeGagne praised Shorrock's vocals, which give it "the perfect MOR sound, draping the tracks with his cool, breezy style that is much more apparent and effectual here than on the band's earlier efforts." Sleeper Catcher provided three singles, with "Shut Down Turn Off" being the highest charting in Australia at No. 16. However in the US the highest charting was "Reminiscing", which peaked at No. 3. The album's last single, "Lady", reached No. 10 in the US in early 1979.

Pellicci was hospitalised in May 1978 with severe burns due to methylated spirits igniting on a barbecue. Geoff Cox (ex-Brian Cadd, Bootleg Family Band, Avalanche) substituted on drums, rather than cancelling their next US tour. They supported Boz Scaggs, Jimmy Buffett and the Eagles. Cox remained playing alongside Pellicci when he joined the tour in August 1978; they supported the Eagles at C.N.E. Stadium in Toronto. Cox left once Pellicci had recovered.

Keyboardist Ian Mason, who was a session player on LRB's first three albums, played as a guest on some dates of their 1978 Australian tour. Mal Logan (ex-the Dingoes, Renée Geyer Band) joined on keyboards for another US tour which commenced in late December 1978. Logan stayed on as a touring member until the end of 1981.

Nimmervoll observed that by February 1978, "frictions inside the band continued to brew, relieved a little by" side projects. Birtles & Goble showcased tracks rejected for LRB. They issued three singles, "Lonely Lives" (March 1978), "I'm Coming Home" (March 1979) and "How I Feel Tonight" (June 1980) and an album, The Last Romance (May 1980). "I'm Coming Home" reached No. 8 in Australia. Shorrock's solo single was a cover version of Bobby Darin's "Dream Lover" (April 1979), which peaked in the Australian top 10.

Little River Band's fifth studio album, First Under the Wire, was released in July 1979. It reached No. 2 in Australia, equalling Diamantina Cocktail. It was also their highest charting album on the Billboard 200 at No. 10. In November it was certified by RIAA as a platinum album. AllMusic's Mark Allan described their "mix of harmony-drenched pop tunes and unthreatening rockers" which had a wide appeal. Both singles, "Lonesome Loser" and "Cool Change", peaked in the US top 10. Briggs wrote "Lonesome Loser" and Shorrock wrote "Cool Change".

Bassist George McArdle left in late January 1979 to become a Christian minister. In July that year Barry Sullivan (ex-Chain, Renée Geyer Band) took over on bass guitar. He was replaced, in turn, by American Wayne Nelson (ex-Jim Messina Band) in April 1980.

Backstage Pass was the first live album released by the band. It was recorded by the Australian Broadcasting Commission at the Adelaide Festival Theatre in November 1978 and released in October 1979. It peaked at No. 18 on the Australian Kent Music Report. The album was then released in the United States as a double album in March 1980, combined with the group's next live album, Live in America.

Goble was the producer for Australian pop singer John Farnham's solo album, Uncovered, which was released in September 1980. Goble wrote or co-wrote nine of its ten tracks and provided vocals. The album had other LRB alumni: Briggs, Formosa, Logan, Nelson, Pellicci and Sullivan. Farnham had signed with Wheatley's management company.

The line-up of Birtles, Briggs, Goble, Nelson, Pellicci and Shorrock recorded Little River Band's sixth studio album, Time Exposure, which was released in August 1981, with George Martin (the Beatles) producing. The Canberra Times' Garry Raffaele felt "it's easy listening, no demands, easing up, slowing down, getting older." By the time it appeared, Stephen Housden (ex-Stevie Wright Band, the Imports) replaced Briggs on lead guitar. The album reached No .9 in Australia and No. 21 in the US; and in November it was certified gold by RIAA.

In August 1981, Nelson provided lead vocals for its lead single, "The Night Owls", which peaked at No. 18 in Australia and No. 6 in the US. Raffaele described the track as "the punchiest thing LRB has done for some time but it's still middle-of-the-road pap, hummable". Nelson also shared vocals with Shorrock on the second single, "Take It Easy on Me" (November 1981). According to Nimmervoll, Nelson's presence added to the conflict between band members and that Goble "agitated within the band to replace [Shorrock] with [Farnham]".

=== 1982–1986: John Farnham years ===
In February 1982, Shorrock left Little River Band and resumed his solo career. Farnham replaced Shorrock on lead vocals and "Man on Your Mind", the third single from Time Exposure (with Shorrock's vocals), reached No. 14 in the US. Birtles described the removal of Briggs and Shorrock:

I remember a couple of embarrassing moments in the studio where [Briggs] was quite rude to [Martin], insisting that his way was better and that he didn't need to be told how or what to play. After our return from recording in Montserrat, during a meeting at [Wheatley]'s house, [Goble] was quite vocal about [Briggs'] conduct. He confronted [him] and virtually fired him ... After [Shorrock] took his frustration out on me one day during a rehearsal ... I said I couldn't work with [him] any more. [Goble], who had always been at opposite poles to Shorrock, agreed with me and Wheatley started freaking out saying he thought it was a big mistake ... in hindsight, I believe he was right on the money and to me this would be the mistake that cut Little River Band's throat.

In September 1982, Farnham told Susan Moore of The Australian Women's Weekly how easy it was to fit into the group although both recording and stage work had differed. On covering early LRB repertoire he said, "We've had to change the key with a lot of things because Glenn sang in a different register from me." The first single with Farnham as lead vocalist, "The Other Guy", was released in November 1982 and reached No. 18 in Australia and No. 11 in the US. Another single, "Down on the Border", peaked at No. 7 in Australia.

Their next single, "We Two", from their seventh studio album, The Net, reached No. 22 in the US. It had been co-produced by the group and Ern Rose (Mississippi, Rénee Geyer, Stars). DeGagne reviewed the album, which "failed to capture the same success they experienced with Shorrock at the helm. The same type of soft rock fluidity and laid-back charm has been replaced with a sound that seems forced and somewhat strained". In 1983, "You're Driving Me Out of My Mind" became the group's last single to reach the US Top 40. The band moved towards a 1980s style of sound and added a keyboardist, David Hirschfelder (ex-Peter Cupples Band, who had guested on The Net and at some LRB shows), in September 1983.

The pressures of success and constant touring took their toll on the band as line-up changes continued. Birtles left in October 1983 because he did not like the harder, more progressive musical path which Goble was taking and because he had preferred Shorrock's vocals. Birtles contributed to soundtracks for the feature films From Something Great (1985) and Boulevard of Broken Dreams (1988). He also worked as a session musician, eventually relocating to the US and releasing a solo album, Driven by Dreams, in 2000. Pellicci left in February 1984 for similar reasons and Steve Prestwich (ex-Cold Chisel) replaced him on drums. Pellicci also became a session musician: including working for Brian Cadd.

Their eighth studio album, Playing to Win, was released in January 1985, which delivered a harder sound with producer Spencer Proffer. The change in sound, along with the unofficial shortening of their name to LRB, confused fans and radio programmers. Australian musicologist Ian McFarlane felt it was "a strong album but it failed to halt the band's slide in popularity." It reached No. 38 in Australia and No. 75 on the US charts. The title track made No. 59 on the Australian singles chart, No. 15 on the Billboard Mainstream Rock chart and No. 60 on Hot 100. The second single, "Blind Eyes", failed to enter the charts.

In July 1985, LRB performed on the Oz for Africa benefit concert (part of the global Live Aid program): "Don't Blame Me", "Full Circle", "Night Owls", and "Playing to Win". They were broadcast in Australia (on both Seven Network and Nine Network) and on MTV in the US. In the US the ABC network broadcast "Don't Blame Me" and "Night Owls" during their Live Aid telecast ("Night Owls" was only partially transmitted). Farnham left the group following the completion of their short Australian tour in April 1986, which had Malcolm Wakeford drumming in Prestwich's place. Their ninth studio album, No Reins, recorded when Farnham was still aboard, appeared in the next month and was produced by Richard Dodd. It reached the Kent Music Report top 100.

Farnham explained to Pollyanna Sutton of The Canberra Times why he left, "[On the stage] I was up front and had to be the most liked. There was a lot of pressure because it wasn't, perhaps, working as it should, although there were other contributing things like the membership changes and perhaps the material." Nimmervoll described the Farnham years, "The experiment had never worked. Whatever [Farnham]'s talents, America longed for [Shorrock]. At the end of 1985, while LRB was seriously contemplating its future, Farnham took the initiative to start work on another solo album." Farnham continued to be managed by Wheatley – who left LRB in 1987 – and his solo career took off with his next album, Whispering Jack (October 1986). Hirschfelder, McLachlan, Nelson and Pellicci contributed to the album or the related tour.

=== 1987–1998: Shorrock's return ===
After Farnham's departure, Little River Band were in limbo until July 1987 when Pellicci and Shorrock returned at the request of Irving Azoff, the head of MCA Records, who wanted the band on his label. The reformed group signed new management with Geoffrey Schuhkraft and Paul Palmer, who assisted the line-up of Goble, Housden, Nelson, Pellicci and Shorrock in establishing a holding company, We Two Pty. Ltd, with all members as directors in equal share. Former manager Glenn Wheatley signed away rights to the band's name to the new company on 12 May 1988.

In July 1988, Pellicci described the group's previous two albums: "It was an overstatement to say the response to No Reins and Playing to Win was lukewarm — there was no response at all." The revamped group with keyboardist James Roche (Jamie Paddle) performed at the opening of World Expo 88 in Brisbane on 30 April. They were joined by the Eagles' Glenn Frey, who also accompanied them that year on tour.

The group released their tenth studio album, Monsoon, in May 1988, which peaked at No. 9 on the Kent Music Report. It was co-produced by Boylan and Goble. The Canberra Times' Lisa Wallace was disappointed by its lack of innovation despite showing technical skills. Its lead single, "Love Is a Bridge", co-written by Goble and Housden was released in April and peaked at No. 7 on the Kent Music Report. It was their second highest charting single in the Australian market, and a moderate Adult Contemporary radio hit in the US.

In 1989 the group recorded "Listen to Your Heart", written by Tom Kelly and Billy Steinberg, for the film soundtrack of The Karate Kid Part III.

The eleventh studio album, Get Lucky, was released in April 1990. It was their last charting album in Australia and made the top 60. Mike Boehm of the Los Angeles Times caught their gig in May, where "[Shorrock] was stiff and seemed stuck for words between songs. But he knew what to do when the music started, singing in a comfortably husky voice that resembled Phil Collins in tone and easy pop appeal. [Nelson], the group's Californian, generated more heat in his two lead vocal turns. The three-part harmonies behind Shorrock were exemplary, although the Crosby, Stills & Nash parallels were unmistakable. Lead guitarist [Housden] reinforced the emphasis on melody with his clean, lyrical lines."

MCA released a compilation album, Worldwide Love, of tracks from the previous two albums on their Curb Records imprint in June 1991. Both Get Lucky and Worldwide Love peaked in the top 40 on the Swiss Hitparade; with the latter also appearing on the Ö3 Austria Top 40. Goble had ceased touring with the group in 1989 and left altogether by 1992, as well as resigning from We Two. Peter Beckett (ex-Player) joined in 1989 to take Goble's place. The group went through a series of keyboard players, including Tony Sciuto (1990–1992, 1993–1997) and Richard Bryant (1992–1993, ex-the Doobie Brothers).

In September 1992, Nelson's daughter was killed in a traffic collision in San Diego while he was on tour with the band in Europe. Nelson immediately returned home and Hal Tupaea substituted on bass guitar for the New Zealand dates of the band's tour in November 1993. Little River Band subsequently took a break until Nelson's return in 1994 and embarked on a four-and-a-half month 20th anniversary US tour in 1995.

Shorrock left again in 1996: he was offered the option to buy out the remaining members of We Two Pty. Ltd. He took a one-third share of the monetary value of the company as he did not want to commit to the band's US touring schedule. Shorrock was replaced on lead vocals by Melbourne singer Steve Wade (ex-Dolphin Street). Nelson also left in 1996 and Tupaea returned on bass guitar. This line-up lasted until late 1997, when everyone, except Housden and Wade, started to leave, including Pellicci, who left again that December. The departure of all original directors left Housden as the sole owner of We Two Pty Ltd and the Little River Band's name and trademarks.

=== 1998–present ===
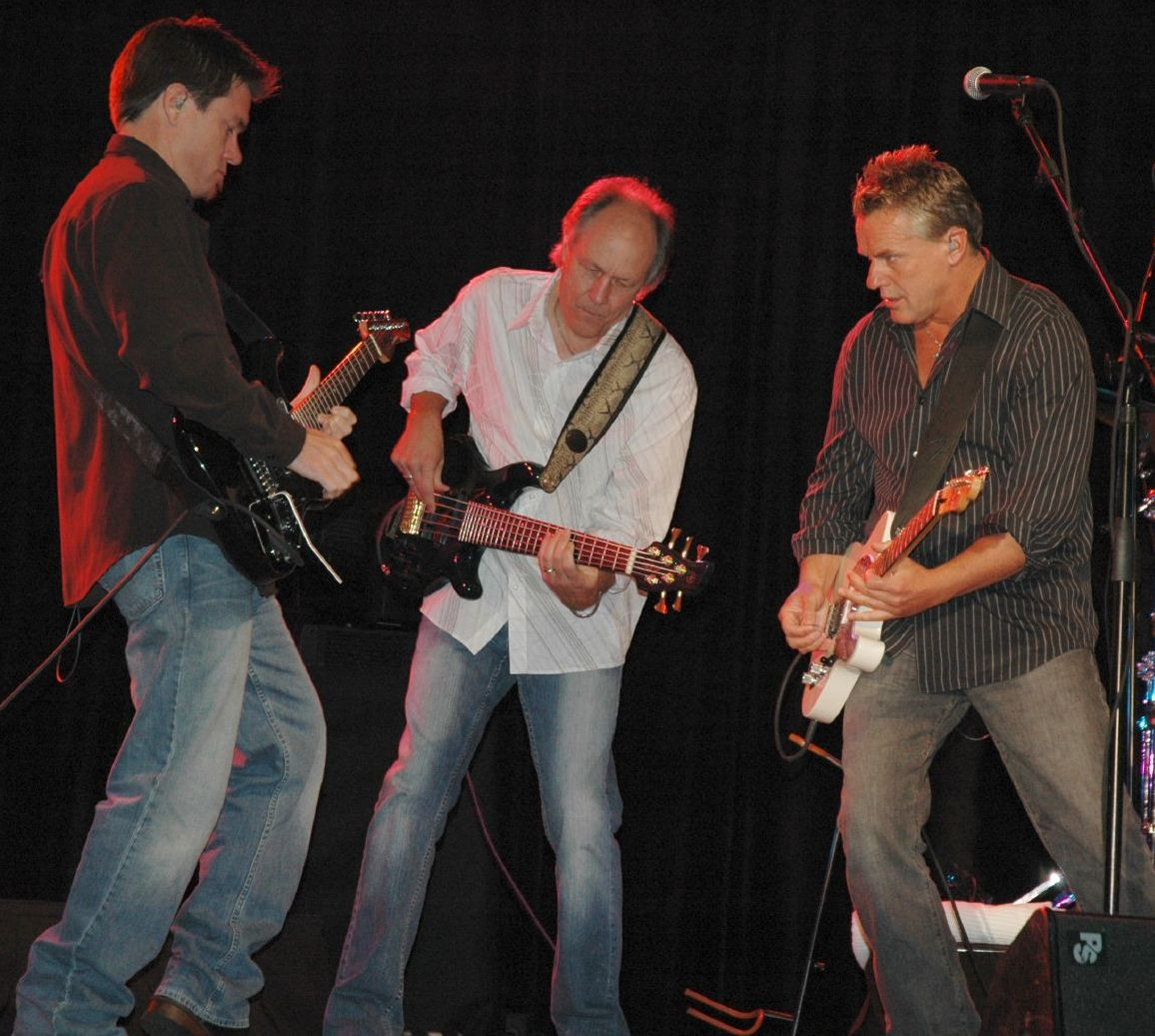
LRB performing at the Seminole Hard Rock Hotel and Casino Hollywood in October 2006

In 1998, Housden established a new band configuration with contracted members: Wade was joined by Paul Gildea on vocals and guitars; Kevin Murphy on vocals, drums and percussion; Adrian Scott on vocals and keyboards (ex–Air Supply) and McLachlan, who returned after 22 years, on bass guitar. McLachlan's second tenure was short lived; both he and Scott departed after a year. Nelson returned early in the following year and Glenn Reither joined on keyboards, saxophone and backing vocals. Gildea and Wade left early in 2000 with Australian Greg Hind joining on vocals and guitars and Nelson taking over as lead singer. The line-up of Hind, Housden, Murphy, Nelson and Reither recorded two studio albums, Where We Started From (November 2000) and Test of Time (June 2004).

In March 2002, Birtles Shorrock Goble (BSG) were formed in Melbourne as a soft rock trio, initially billed as "The Original Little River Band" or "The Voices of Little River Band". Wheatley returned as their manager. They undertook a series of concerts performing LRB's earlier material. In June of that year a legal dispute, We Two Pty Ltd v Shorrock (2002), over the use of the name "Little River Band" reached the Federal Court of Australia. Housden's company, We Two Pty Ltd, lodged an action against Birtles, Goble and Shorrock seeking to stop BSG from using the LRB trademarks, logos and band name. Housden provided documentation showing the assignment of those trademarks to We Two, registered by the United States Patent and Trademark Office in 1989, and Birtles' transfer of ownership of the url "littleriverband.com" to We Two in 2000.

The parties settled out of court on 13 June 2002 where We Two had ownership of the Little River Band name, trademarks and logos and that Birtles, Goble and Shorrock could reference their history in advertising separate to BSG's name but only in a descriptive manner. On 12 July of that year Birtles, Goble and Shorrock were directed to pay half of We Two's taxed costs. A further legal case in late July 2005 was also settled out of court which allowed the trio to advertise their Little River Band connection but not to perform under that name. The three former members shared their frustration at the situation via song, with Goble's "Someone's Taken Our History", Birtles' "Revolving Door" and Shorrock's "Hear My Voice".

At the end of 2004, Murphy and Reither left LRB and Chris Marion joined on keyboards, while Kip Raines briefly took on drumming duties until replaced by Billy Thomas in early 2005. Housden stopped touring with the band in 2006 but still participated in their recordings and management. Rich Herring took over lead guitar on tour and Mel Watts replaced Thomas, who had suffered a shoulder injury, on drums in 2007. Ryan Ricks replaced Watts in 2012.

The group self released a Christmas album, We Call It Christmas, in November 2007 and a five song EP, Outback, in December 2009.

Lehigh Valley Music's reviewer John Moser saw their performance in early 2013. He perceived that they largely played material from before 1985 and were unable to deliver improvements on the originals. That August, LRB released the album Cuts Like a Diamond on the Frontiers Records, a majority of which was written by other musicians.

Little River Band were scheduled to appear on The Tonight Show Starring Jimmy Fallon in January 2015 to promote the group's 40th anniversary. It was cancelled after complaints from early members over advertising that LRB would perform "Reminiscing". Permission for the use of any songs written by Birtles, Briggs, Goble or Shorrock was refused. Shorrock expressed his concerns over LRB's misrepresentations, "They are promoting a newly recorded album of their own material, or whatever material they have got. They should do that rather than pretend they are the band that sold 30 million albums."

In March 2015 the group's appearance in Winston-Salem, North Carolina, was cancelled after the venue received a cease and desist order from the early members regarding the use of their recordings in advertising and the demands by LRB members to be paid in full before performing. The venue described the latter demand as "not only unreasonable, but uncustomary". Rahni Sadler of Australian television show Sunday Night investigated the band name controversy. She asked Housden to display the document which showed the transfer of ownership but he had not located it. Wheatley said that he could not remember signing it when it appeared in the court case. Shorrock offered to make peace with Housden and perform together. Housden told Sadler that he would not allow the original members to work as Little River Band "in this lifetime". Housden and Nelson acknowledged that the later version of the band would not be successful without the songs of the founders.

In September 2015, Little River Band received Casino Musical Entertainer of the Year at the Annual G2E Awards ceremony at the Hard Rock Hotel in Las Vegas. As of 2017, LRB continue to tour, mostly in the US, performing more than 80 concerts annually and re-recording earlier material. When asked about LRB's Hits Revisited album, Birtles disparaged it saying, "That to me is the comedy album ... They re-arranged all the songs and it's bloody awful. They're nothing more than a tribute band." Also in 2017, Little River Band blocked Australia from its official website. Australian access to the band's Facebook page was also blocked.

On 13 November 2017, Birtles on Australian talk show Studio 10 confirmed that the founders would not reunite, saying that "Once [BSG] folded we all realised it wasn't going to go any further than that. It's unfortunate how we lost the name and everything, but if it's ruled in the court that way all you can do is walk away from it."

In February 2018, Herring in Everyone Loves Guitar disclosed that "We actually re-recorded all the hits and I'll say without any shame that I tried to make it sound as close to the originals as possible by bringing in background singers that actually sounded like those guys did 30–40 years ago. I'm pretty proud of it."

Nashville musician Colin Whinnery was recruited to replace Hind on vocals and guitar in 2018, consequently there are no Australians in Little River Band.

In January 2019 an agent for Goble, Birtles and Shorrock applied to the Australian Trademark Office to register "Little River Band" as a trademark. Little River Band Pty Ltd had current registered trademarks for "Little River Band". The application sought to have the existing Little River Band trademarks removed, alleging non-use in the three-year period ending in December 2018. On 17 May 2021 the Australian Trademark Office ruled in favour of Little River Band Pty Ltd's opposition to the application for removal of their "Little River Band" trademarks.

From May 2020 major music and streaming platforms such as iTunes recognise the original Little River Band as a separate entity to the latter band. On 18 September 2020, Birtles, Briggs, Goble and Shorrock participated in a video-conference where they discussed the formation and early history of the band.

In November 2020 the current lineup released Black Tie which features Little River Band's greatest hits performed with an orchestra (arranged by keyboardist Marion) recorded at a series of concerts with the Craig Turley Rock Symphony. This followed the concept of the album Backstage Pass recorded by the original members of the band in 1978 with the Adelaide Symphony Orchestra.

In December 2020, Rolling Stone Australia magazine reported that "the songwriters responsible for the band’s biggest songs – Graeham Goble, Glenn Shorrock, Beeb Birtles, and David Briggs – are unable to perform as the Little River Band, the band they themselves invented back in 1974! A version of Little River Band consisting of American musicians continues to tour, playing shitty versions of the hits. The owner of the title, Stephen Housden, is adamant he won’t share the rights with the original members."

Little River Band were listed at number 44 in Rolling Stone Australia's "50 Greatest Australian Artists of All Time" issue.

Little River Band's original manager, Glenn Wheatley, died from complications of COVID-19 on 1 February 2022 at the age of 74.

In 2022, Nashville singer, composer and guitarist Bruce Wallace replaced Rich Herring in the current band's lineup.

In September 2022 the band founders announced the remastered and expanded re-release of their first 10 albums, alongside two new compilations, Ultimate Hits and Masterpieces, which were released on 14 October 2022.

The current version of Little River Band independently released a new album Window To The World in October 2024.

Original bassist Roger McLachlan died from pancreatic cancer in April 2025.

== Legacy ==
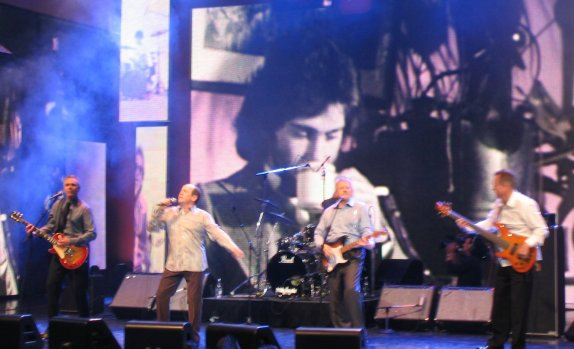
Former members of Little River Band performing at their induction into the ARIA Hall of Fame, 17 October 2004

The Little River Band are considered to be among Australia's most significant bands. As of September 2004 they have sold more than 30 million records and scored 13 US Top 40 hits. In May 2001 the Australasian Performing Right Association (APRA), as part of its 75th anniversary celebrations, named "Cool Change" as one of the Top 30 Australian songs of all time. At that ceremony Goble and Shorrock reconnected after ten years; they proposed a reunion with Birtles to perform their earlier material, which became the trio Birtles Shorrock Goble.

At the ARIA Music Awards of 2004, Little River Band were inducted into the Australian Recording Industry Association (ARIA) Hall of Fame. The presentation acknowledged the band's three decade career and thirteen official members and was accepted by the 1976 to 1978 line-up of Birtles, Briggs, Goble, Pellicci, McArdle and Shorrock. They were referred to as "The Classic Line-up of the Little River Band". They performed "Help Is on Its Way" at the ceremony on 17 October 2004. Shorrock had previously been inducted in 1991 for his work with the Twilights, Axiom and his solo career. Farnham, who had been inducted in 2003 for his solo work, was not inducted in 2004 with Little River Band. However, Farnham's contribution to LRB was acknowledged by Goble in his acceptance speech. The 2018 version of Little River Band claims the band's Hall of Fame induction, amongst other past achievements, on its website.

With more than five million plays, "Reminiscing", written by Goble, was recognised by Broadcast Music Incorporated (BMI) as one of the most frequently played songs in the history of US radio, the highest achievement of any Australian pop song internationally. According to Albert Goldman's biography, John Lennon named "Reminiscing" as one of his favourite songs. May Pang, Lennon's erstwhile girlfriend, said they considered "Reminiscing" as "our song". "Lady" has accumulated more than four million plays.

LRB were mentioned in the 2010 film The Other Guys, when the character portrayed by Will Ferrell played "Reminiscing" while driving. The character portrayed by Mark Wahlberg threw the CD out the window, but Ferrell's character played it again later on and said that he always had six identical LRB CDs in his car. In Sea Stories: My Life in Special Operations (2019), Admiral William H. McRaven wrote that he would sing "Happy Anniversary" before every jump.

Shorrock was appointed a member of the Order of Australia (AM) on 26 January 2020, awarded for significant service to the performing arts as a singer, songwriter and entertainer. In March 2020 he was due to perform at the Little River Country Fair in the town after which LRB were named. Shorrock wanted to celebrate the 45th anniversary of the group's first show. Due to the COVID-19 pandemic the performance was postponed. In September, Goble was acknowledged for achieving 12 million plays of his songs on US commercial radio by BMI after receiving his fifth such Million-Air Award, with the latest for "The Night Owls" (see their BMI Awards).

== Personnel ==
=== Current members ===
- Wayne Nelson – bass, vocals (1980–96, 1999–present)
- Chris Marion – keyboards, vocals (2004–present)
- Ryan Ricks – drums, vocals (2012–present)
- Colin Whinnery – guitar, vocals (2018–present)
- Bruce Wallace – guitar, vocals (2022–present)

=== Classic lineup ===
- Glenn Shorrock – vocals (1975–82, 1987–96)
- Graeham Goble – guitar, vocals (1975–92)
- Beeb Birtles – guitar, vocals (1975–83)
- Derek Pellicci – drums (1975–84, 1987–97)
- David Briggs – guitar (1976–81)
- George McArdle – bass (1976–79)

=== Other former members ===
- Graham Davidge – guitar (1975)
- Dave Orams – bass (1975)
- Ric Formosa – guitar, vocals (1975–76)
- Roger McLachlan – bass (1975–76, 1998–99; died 2025)
- Geoff Cox – drums (1978)
- Mal Logan – keyboards (touring 1978–82)
- Barry Sullivan – bass (1979–80; died 2003)
- Stephen Housden – guitar (1981–2006)
- John Farnham – vocals (1982–86)
- David Hirschfelder – keyboards, synthesisers, backing vocals (1983–86)
- Steve Prestwich – drums (1984–86; died 2011)
- Malcolm Wakeford – drums (1986)
- James Roche – keyboards (1988–89)
- Peter Beckett – guitar, vocals (1989–97)
- Tony Sciuto – keyboards, guitar, vocals (1990–92, 1993–97)
- Richard Bryant – keyboards, backing vocals (1992–93)
- Steve Wade – lead vocals, guitar (1996–2000)
- Hal Tupaea – bass (1993, 1996–97)
- Kevin Murphy – drums, vocals (1998–2004)
- Paul Gildea – guitar, vocals (1998–2000)
- Adrian Scott – keyboards, vocals (1998–99)
- Glenn Reither – keyboards, saxophone, backing vocals (1999–2004)
- Greg Hind - vocals, guitar (2000–18)
- Kip Raines – drums (2004–05)
- Billy Thomas – drums (2005–07)
- Rich Herring – guitar, vocals (2006–22)
- Mel Watts – drums (2007–12)

==== Deceased former members ====
- Barry Sullivan (2003)
- Steve Prestwich (2011)
- Roger McLachlan (2025)

== Discography ==
- Little River Band (1975)
- After Hours (1976)
- Diamantina Cocktail (1977)
- Sleeper Catcher (1978)
- First Under the Wire (1979)
- Time Exposure (1981)
- The Net (1983)
- Playing to Win (1985)
- No Reins (1986)
- Monsoon (1988)
- Get Lucky (1990)
- Where We Started From (2000)
- Test of Time (2004)
- We Call It Christmas (2007)
- Cuts Like a Diamond (2013)
- Window to the World (2024)
