= Stephen Housden =

English-Australian musician (born 1951)

- Born: Stephen Frank Housden; 1951 (age 74–75); Bedford, Bedfordshire, England
- Origin: Melbourne, Victoria, Australia
- Genre: Pop
- Occupation: Musician
- Instruments: Guitar; vocals
- Years active: 1971–2006
- Label: Tune Seven
- Formerly of: Little River Band
- Website: stephenhousden.com

Stephen Frank Housden (born 1951) is an English-born Australian musician. He joined the rock group Little River Band (LRB) in 1981 on lead guitar and vocals and ceased performing with them in 2006. Previously, Housden had worked as a session musician for various Australian artists. During the 1970s he was a member of Stevie Wright's band and Marcia Hines' touring and session bands. Housden released his debut solo album, New World Groove, in 1993.

== Biography ==
Stephen Frank Housden was born in 1951 in Bedfordshire, England. With his father, Frank, and mother, Sylvia, he migrated to Australia in April 1959 on Fairsky when he was eight. He is the brother of Australian guitarist Jak Housden who was a member of the Badloves and the Whitlams. In 1971, Housden joined Rachette on lead guitar alongside Peter Deacon on bass guitar, Stevie Wright on lead vocals and Malcolm Wakeford on drums. In the next year, Housden, Deacon and Wakeford were members of Nitro. Nitro issued a single, "Blues in My Shoes" (September 1973), on Warm & Genuine Records.

In the mid-1970s, Housden was a member of the Stevie Wright Band. He played on Marcia Hines' debut album, Marcia Shines (October 1975), and joined her touring band, which is documented on her live album Marcia Hines Live Across Australia (February 1978). From 1980 to 1981 he was a member of the Imports with Wakeford, Claude Carranza, Kevin Cooney and Simon Gillies.

Housden, on lead and slide guitars and backing vocals, joined Little River Band (LRB) in August 1981, which were then based in the United States. At that time the LRB line-up was Beeb Birtles on guitars and vocals, Graeham Goble on guitars and vocals, Wayne Nelson on bass guitar and vocals, Derek Pellicci on drums and percussion and Glenn Shorrock on lead vocals. They were promoting their sixth studio album, Time Exposure. Housden's first recordings with LRB were issued on the live video album, Live Exposure (1981), which was performed at The Summit in Houston, Texas in October 1981. In the video, Shorrock introduced him to the audience, "This is Stephen. He's our new boy. He plays guitar very well and dances OK. He's a loony toon." In the following February, John Farnham replaced Shorrock on lead vocals. Farnham left LRB to resume his solo career in mid-1986, the band were in hiatus from October of that year.

Upon resumption of LRB in December 1987 the line-up was Housden, Goble, Nelson, Pellici and Shorrock. LRB's name, logos and trademarks were signed over to a holding company, We Two Pty Ltd, with its members as directors in equal share. Over subsequent years, except for Housden, all these members left and he became sole owner of We Two Pty Ltd in 1998. Outside of his duties with LRB, Housden continued as a session musician on albums by Doug Ashdown (1983), Normie Rowe (1984), Brian Cadd (1985) and Marc Hunter (1986). During early 1990, Housden was a member of Farnham's backing band. From 1990 to 1991 he was a member of Broken Voices, with Goble and a vocalist, Susie Ahern, which recorded a self-titled album. He was a session guitarist on James Reyne's Electric Digger Dandy (1991) and Goble's two solo albums, Nautilus (1993) and Stop (1995). In 1991 he joined Million Dollar Twang with Mick Pealing (ex-Stars) on lead vocals, Andrew Midson on bass guitar, John Swinburne on guitar and Chris Tabone on drums. They provided cover versions of 1960s songs.

In 1993, Housden issued his debut solo album, New World Groove, on Tune Seven, which was co-produced with Anthony J. Fossey. All ten tracks were written by Housden. For the album he was joined in the studio by Fossey on keyboards, grand piano and synthesisers, Travis Clark on bass guitar and Phil Henderson on drums and drum programming. According to Guitar Nine's reviewer it is "chock full of tasty licks and melodic themes" and "marked by a tasteful sense of phrasing, while commanding your immediate attention." The lead track, "Celtic Warrior", was used on the soundtrack for TV series, Baywatch. In 1999 Housden and his family relocated to Cork, Ireland.

In June 2002, Housden initiated a Federal Court of Australia case, We Two Pty Ltd v Shorrock (2002), to prevent former LRB members Birtles, Goble and Shorrock from using the group's name, logos or trademarks. They had formed a trio, Birtles Shorrock Goble, earlier that year, and sought to advertise themselves as "The Original Little River Band" or similar. After Housden demonstrated his ownership of We Two Pty Ltd, a settlement was reached whereby the trio would not "use the band name, trade marks or logos". Solicitor Ron Tait, for Birtles, Goble and Shorrock, reflected on the settlement, "Legally it's a fair outcome because it's proper, the documentation was all there and the evidence was all there, but from the point of view, as I said before, of their heritage, it galls them slightly." Housden has continued LRB, which mainly performs in the US, using hired musicians. He stopped performing with them in March 2006 but continued directing the group's schedule. As of January 2017, Housden resides in Cork, Ireland, and periodically performs at charity events.
