= Take It Easy on Me =

- North American 7" artwork

Single by Little River Band

from the album Time Exposure
- B-side: "Orbit Zero"
- Released: 22 December 1981
- Recorded: 1981
- Genre: Soft rock
- Length: 3:45
- Label: Capitol
- Songwriter: Graeham Goble
- Producer: George Martin

Little River Band singles chronology
"The Night Owls" (1981)	"Take It Easy on Me" (1981)	"Man on Your Mind" (1982)

"Take It Easy on Me" is a song by Australian soft rock band Little River Band, released in December 1981 as the second single from the album Time Exposure. The song reached No. 10 on the U.S. Billboard Hot 100, becoming their sixth and last top 10 hit on the chart and also reached No. 14 on the Adult Contemporary chart. The song was written by band member Graham Goble and produced by British record producer George Martin.

== Background ==
Two versions of this song were recorded, with Glenn Shorrock and Wayne Nelson respectively on lead vocals. "The Night Owls", with Nelson on lead, had already been selected as the first single from the album. When Martin selected the Nelson version of "Take It Easy on Me" for the album and second single, Shorrock complained, and his version of the song was used instead (though Nelson's vocal was retained for the bridge) and released as the second single in December 1981.

== Track listings ==
Australian 7" (Capitol Records – CP-665)
A. "Take It Easy on Me" - 3:45
B. "Orbit Zero" - 4:28

New Zealand 7" (Capitol Records – F 5057)
A. "Take It Easy on Me" - 3:45
B. "Orbit Zero" - 4:28

North American 7" (Capitol Records A-5057)
A. "Take It Easy on Me" - 3:45
B. "Orbit Zero" - 4:28

== Charts ==
=== Weekly charts ===
Chart (1982)	Peak position
Canada (RPM Top Singles)	17
Canada (RPM Adult Contemporary)	27
U.S. Billboard Hot 100	10
U.S. Easy Listening (Billboard)	14
U.S. (Cash Box)	13

=== Year-end charts ===
Chart (1982)	Position
Canada RPM Top Singles	91
U.S. Billboard Hot 100	41
U.S. Cash Box	85
