= Wayne Nelson =

American singer and bassist (born 1950)

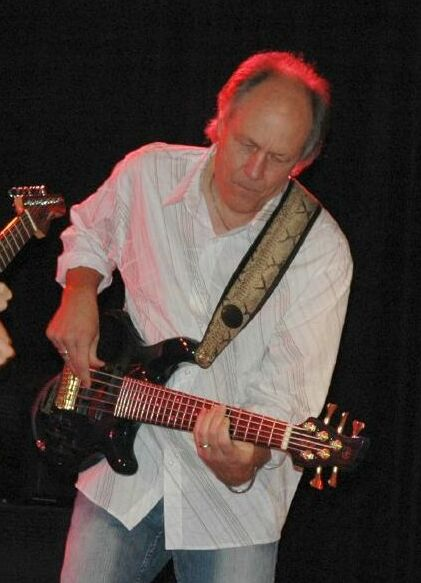
- Nelson with Little River Band in 2006

Background information
- Born: June 1, 1950 (age 75); Kansas City, Missouri, U.S.
- Genres: Rock
- Occupation: Musician
- Instrument(s): Vocals, bass guitar
- Years active: 1976–present

Wayne Nelson (born June 1, 1950) is an American musician best known for being the bassist and co-vocalist of the rock band Little River Band, which he joined in 1980. Since 1999, he has been the band's frontman.

Shortly after his birth, Nelson's family moved to Rome, Illinois, a suburb of Peoria. During his teenage years and early twenties, he played in various regional bands around the Chicago area, emulating multiple styles but focusing on rhythm and blues.

In 1978, Nelson moved to Los Angeles, and afterward worked with artists including Kenny Loggins and Jim Messina. He toured with many performers. While in Messina's band and opening for Little River Band in 1980, LRB's management invited Nelson to join the Australian band, and he officially became a member in 1981. In addition to playing bass, he was the lead singer on LRB's hit single "The Night Owls" (1981). Nelson also shared lead vocals with Glenn Shorrock on the single "Take It Easy on Me" (1982), the band's last top US 10 hit.

Nelson's daughter Aubree died in September 1992, aged 13, in a car collision in San Diego. Their son was injured in the same collision. Nelson left LRB from 1996 to 1999 but subsequently rejoined as bass guitarist and lead singer. Since 1997 LRB has no original members.
