= Graeham Goble =

Graeham Goble OAM
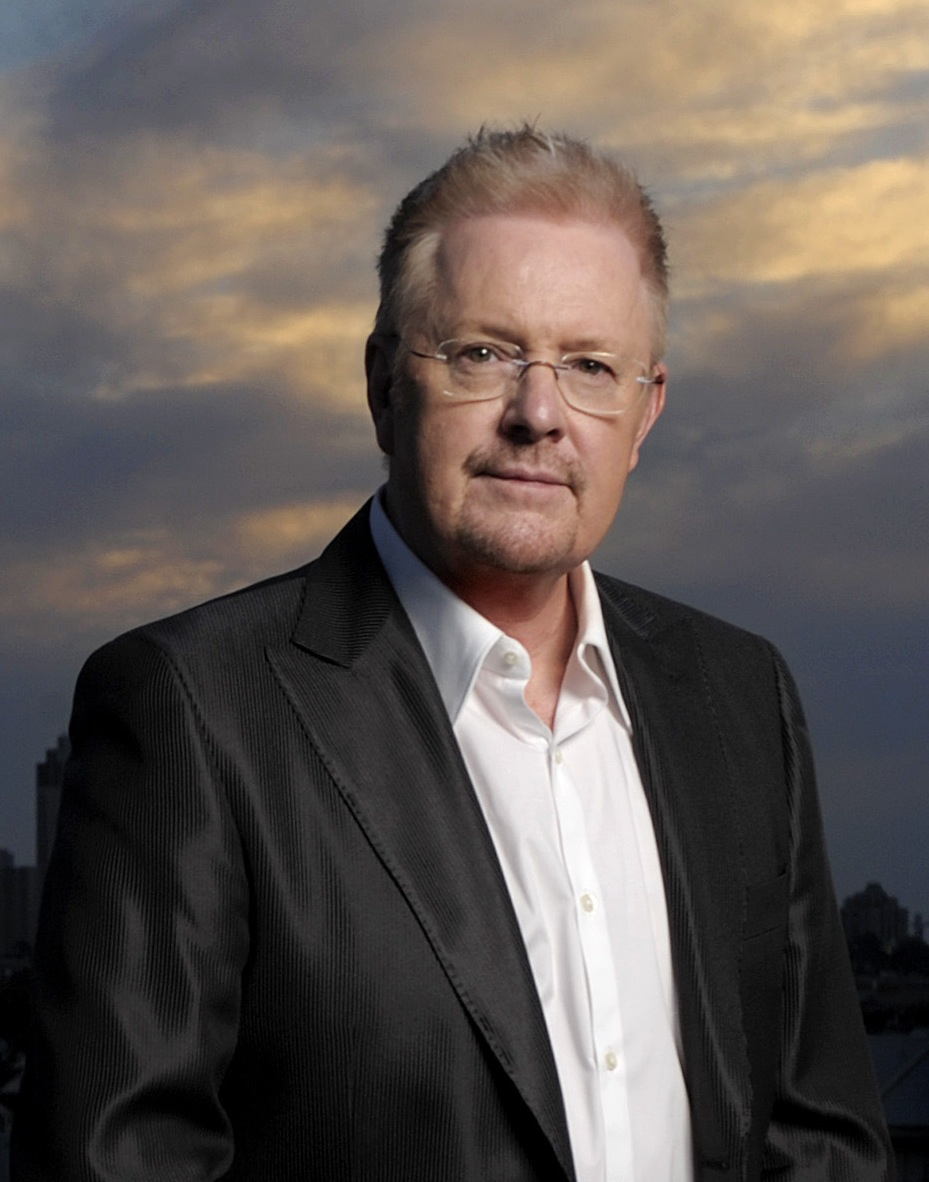
- Goble in 2008

Background information
- Born: Graham George Goble; 15 May 1947 (age 79); Adelaide, South Australia, Australia
- Genres: Pop, soft rock
- Occupations: Musician, singer-songwriter, record producer
- Instruments: Vocals; guitar; bass
- Years active: 1966–present
- Labels: RCA; Gamba; Fable; Bootleg; EMI; Capitol; MCA; Universal; Origin Music
- Formerly of: Little River Band; Mississippi; Birtles & Goble; Travis Wellington Hedge
- Website: graehamgoble.com

Graeham George Goble, OAM (born 15 May 1947) is an Australian musician, singer-songwriter and record producer, best known as a founding member of Australian rock group Little River Band and Birtles Shorrock Goble.

As a performer, Goble was responsible for the vocal arrangements and high harmonies on eleven studio albums and numerous Top 10 singles with LRB. As a songwriter he penned songs like "Reminiscing", "Lady", "Take It Easy on Me", "The Other Guy" and "The Night Owls", each played millions of times on radio. As a producer, Goble's credits include John Farnham's Uncovered album in 1980 and his own catalog of recordings.

Goble is a keen student of spirituality and changed his first name from Graham to Graeham as a consequence of his interest in numerology and feng shui.

Goble was awarded a Medal of the Order of Australia (OAM) in the 2021 Australia Day Honours "for service to the performing arts as a singer, songwriter and producer."

== Biography ==
=== 1947-1960s: Early Life ===
Goble was born in Adelaide, South Australia, and was drawn to music, in particular its harmonies, at an early age. "My early influences were bands like The Beatles, The Hollies, Crosby, Stills, Nash & Young, Bread and I always wanted to be in a band with harmonies. ... From my very first band we had 3 part harmonies"

=== 1966-1974: Early groups The Silence, Travis Wellington Hedge, Allison Gros & Drummond ===
Goble started his music career as a drummer but quickly progressed to the banjo. "As soon as I had a stringed instrument in my hands I suddenly had all these melodies." Thereafter came the transition to guitar. A number of bands followed in quick succession: The Silence (1966–67), Travis Wellington Hedge (1968), Allison Gros (1969–71) and Drummond (1971). Each of these bands recorded singles and or albums.

Timeline
1966	The Silence
1968	Travis Wellington Hedge
1969	Allison Gros (aka Drummond)
1972	Mississippi
1975	Little River Band (including Birtles & Goble 1978–1980)
1986	Band on hiatus
1988	Little River Band
1989	Broken Voices
1991	Graham Goble (including The Graham Goble Encounter 1993)
2002	Birtles Shorrock Goble
2007	Graeham Goble

The members of Allison Gros were recruited to record the song "Daddy Cool" but their Chipmunk version was so atypical that they recorded under the fictitious name Drummond. Drummond would provide Goble with his first Number 1 hit single with "Daddy Cool". "Daddy Cool" would remain on top of the charts for seven weeks from 6 September 1971.

The success of the hit song "Daddy Cool" brought about greater awareness of Allison Gros/Drummond and led to a recording contract with the new record label Bootleg. The band morphed yet again, this time adopting the name Mississippi. Still consisting of Goble, Russ Johnson and John Mower, the band was augmented by session musicians for the recording of their first, self-titled album.

The first single released by Mississippi would provide Goble with his first chart success as a songwriter, the song "Kings of the World" peaking within the Australian top 10. With a successful album and single behind them, Mississippi hit the road. To fill out their live sound, the band was enhanced by the addition of top musicians including Beeb Birtles (an ex-member of the band Zoot). The first appearance of the expanded Mississippi took place on 28 October 1972 at Corbould Hall, Ballarat. With various personnel changes, but always including Goble, Birtles and Pellicci, Mississippi would go on to notch up over 400 live performances in 1972–74. In 1974, Mississippi were disestablished.

=== 1975-1992: Little River Band (LRB) ===
The nucleus of Goble, Birtles, Pellicci, new boy Glenn Shorrock and manager Wheatley kicked off the revitalised venture. Guitarists Ric Formosa and Roger McLachlan were recruited to complete the sound of the band. The new group performed in public for the first time in March 1975, still known as Mississippi. The new name Little River Band followed soon after, taken from a road sign to the town of Little River as the band travelled to a performance in Geelong. Goble was one of the band's composers (Goble, Birtles, Shorrock and later addition David Briggs all wrote for the group, usually individually), and also acted as vocal arranger and co-producer (with the entire band). Due to his strong interest in the band's on-stage performance and day-to-day administration, Goble would soon come to be known as the "father figure" of the band. Glenn Shorrock put it less kindly, stating that "it's like having a policeman onstage with you every night". The creative tension, competition and differing personalities within the band would also fuel its subsequent rise to international stardom. As George Martin would later remark, "That's what makes these acts what they are. It's a matter of harnessing this energy they have."

"Graham was meticulous in every detail. He drove people crazy with his fanaticism but you had to respect and admire him for his absolute perseverance and his ability to write a good song. Without such songs we had nothing. Graham wrote some classics. He is also very intelligent, as I discovered in our many late-night discussions. Through all his quirks he is a very interesting human being." - Glenn Wheatley.

The group released five studio albums in the 1970s. In 1976, The little River Band's "It's a Long Way There" (written by Goble) became an international hit. This was followed in 1978 with "Reminiscing".

It was Goble who acted as spokesman in moving to have foundation lead vocalist Shorrock replaced by John Farnham.

According to Goble, "that lineup [Goble, Nelson, Housden, Farnham, Prestwich and Hirschfelder] was the most talented LRB lineup that I had ever played in." "The live performances were so inspiring that I enjoyed playing live as much as recording. I count myself privileged to have experienced playing and singing with this line-up." Additionally Goble summed up the LRB experience saying "There's been six bands from Australia that have made an impact in America. How incredible was our destiny to be one of the very few out of all these incredible bands. Think about the thousands of acts that tried – it's an extraordinary achievement."

=== 1978-present: Solo Career & Birtles Shorrock Goble ===
In 1978, After the successful release of The LRB's First Under the Wire, Beeb Birtles and Graeham Goble had composed so many songs that had not been used by LRB and were very keen to be put out as a duo and released The Last Romance. LRB members David Briggs, George McArdle and Derek Pellicci joined the two in the studio, together with other session musicians."

"If The Last Romance album had been successful, I expect that Beeb and I would have left Little River Band and recorded as a duo, e.g. Hall & Oates. Our record company (Capitol) were concerned about this possibility and so our album received little support. It was a great experience to record The Last Romance and it remains one of my favorite recordings."

In 1980, Australian singer John Farnham chose Goble to produce his 1980 album Uncovered. Aside from production and vocal arrangement, Goble also wrote or co-wrote nine of the ten songs on the album.

In 1990, Goble released his debut solo album, Broken Voices, for which he was composer, producer, vocal arranger, harmony vocalist and acoustic guitarist.

This was followed in 1993 with Nautilus and in 1995 with Stop. In 1998, The New Nautilus was released - it's a limited edition album and a re-package of Nautilus with a slightly altered track listing.

A chance meeting between Goble and Glenn Shorrock in 2001 (and a subsequent telephone call to Beeb Birtles) would lead to these three original members of LRB reforming as a group and released a live album Full Circle, which was certified gold in Australia.

In 2006, Goble released The Days Ahead, in 2008, Let It Rain, which musicologist Ed Nimmervoll said "Ultimately Graeham Goble's album Let It Rain is the journey of a lifetime. Listening to it takes us on an exceptional journey of our own." Of the eleven tracks on Let It Rain, two have been heard previously (albeit in different contexts). "Heart & Soul" appeared on the Birtles Shorrock Goble live DVD Full Circle while "Let It Rain" had been performed at the Farmhand Concert for Drought Relief in 2002.

== Personal life ==
Goble has been seriously writing songs since he was 16:

"I still write my songs the same way as when I first began. Usually an idea comes while I'm playing my acoustic guitar, but songs often come to me at any time of the day when I'm not playing my guitar. I sometimes dream complete compositions." Graham Goble (1997)

"I hear everything at once – melody, lyrics, it just comes in. There's a feeling that comes over me and I know that there's a song trying to come through. It's sort of like I'm taken over or someone's trying to contact me; I really believe very much that I'm in some ways channeling this thing. Because when I write a song it's always done very quickly, completed in 20 minutes or maybe half an hour. I never labour anything, or very rarely. The only labouring I've ever done in songwriting might be when I've completed a work, a song, and there might be a couple of lyrics I don't like, so sometimes I might sit with those and really put some brain power in how to fix up the lines. But for the most part it comes to me, it comes in and I can hear the whole thing finished with harmonies and everything." Graeham Goble (2001)

Graeham Goble has spent much of his adult life in the study of spirituality and related concepts:

"I believe very much in Spiritual Realms. I've undertaken a lot of Spiritual study – not religious study, but Spiritual study. There's a big difference. I believe in Guardian Angels and Higher Realms. My studies have taught me that when we sleep our soul leaves our body and has interaction with the Spiritual Realms. I've moved through lots of different beliefs and arrived at Rudolf Steiner."

Goble currently lives in a suburb of Melbourne, Australia. "I think the quality of what I'm doing is very high and the songs are very meaningful because I've lived a lot now. I've written from the point of view of somebody who's been through the mill and come out the other side."

== Solo discography ==
=== Studio albums ===
Title	Details
The Last Romance (with Beeb Birtles)	Released: 1980; Label: Capitol Records (ST.12078); Format: LP, Cassette
Broken Voices	Released: 1990; Label: Format: CD, LP, Cassette
Nautilus	Released: 1993; Label: Castle Communications (CSC 7100); Format: CD, Cassette
Stop	Released: 1995; Label: Words & Music; Format: CD, Cassette
The New Nautilus	Released: 1999; Label: Format: CD
The Days Ahead	Released: September 2006; Label: ORIGiN (OR 081); Format: CD, Digital download
Let It Rain	Released: May 2008; Label: ORIGiN; Format: CD, Digital download
Life Love Song	Released: 2015; Label: Format: CD, Digital download

=== Compilation albums ===
Title	Details
Beginnings (Before Little River Band) (with Glenn Shorrock & Beeb Birtles)	Released: 1978; Label: Capitol Records; Format: Vinyl
Beginnings Vol. 2 (Before Little River Band) (with Glenn Shorrock & Beeb Birtles)	Released: 1980; Label: Capitol Records; Format: Vinyl

== Awards ==
=== APRA Gold Award ===
The Australasian Performing Right Association gave Gold Awards to the best songs in Australia from 1982 to 1990.

Year	Nominee / work	Award	Result
1982	himself ("Reminiscing")	APRA Gold Award	Won
1985	himself ("The Other Guy")	APRA Special Award	Won

=== ARIA Hall of Fame ===
The ARIA Hall of Fame is to honour the growing number of legendary performers, producers, songwriters and others who have influenced music culture in Australia.

Year	Nominee / work	Award	Result
2004	Little River Band	ARIA Hall of Fame	inducted

=== Australian Songwriters Hall of Fame ===
The Australian Songwriters Hall of Fame was established in 2004 to honour the lifetime achievements of some of Australia's greatest songwriters.

Year	Nominee / work	Award	Result
2006	himself	Australian Songwriters Hall of Fame	inducted

=== BMI Special Citation of Achievement ===
Broadcast Music, Inc. (BMI), the performing rights organisation, awards a special citation of achievement for songs played more than one million times on US radio and television. Goble has won five such awards:

Year	Nominee / work	Award	Result
2007	himself ("Take It Easy on Me")	One Million-Air	awarded
2007	himself ("The Other Guy")	One Million-Air	awarded
2014	himself ("Reminiscing")	Five Million-Air	awarded
2017	himself ("Lady")	Four Million-Air	awarded
2020	himself ("The Night Owls")	One Million-Air	awarded

=== Mo Awards ===
The Mo Awards, (technically The Australian Entertainment Mo Awards), are annual Australian entertainment industry awards. They recognise achievements in live entertainment in Australia.

Year	Nominee / work	Award	Result
2004	Birtles Shorrock Goble	Classical Rock Performers of the Year	Won

=== South Australian Music Awards ===
The South Australian Music Awards are an annual two-week celebration of live music, celebrating musical achievements of South Australia.

Year	Nominee / work	Award	Result
2018	himself	Hall Of Fame	inducted
