= List of Little River Band members =

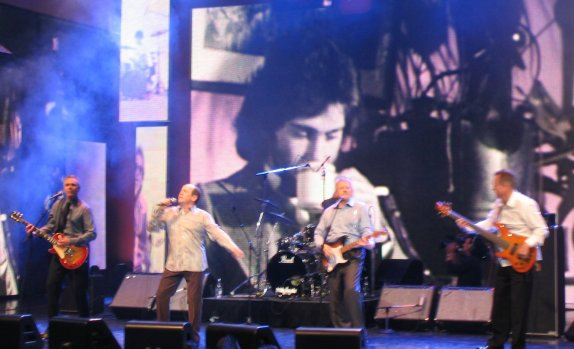
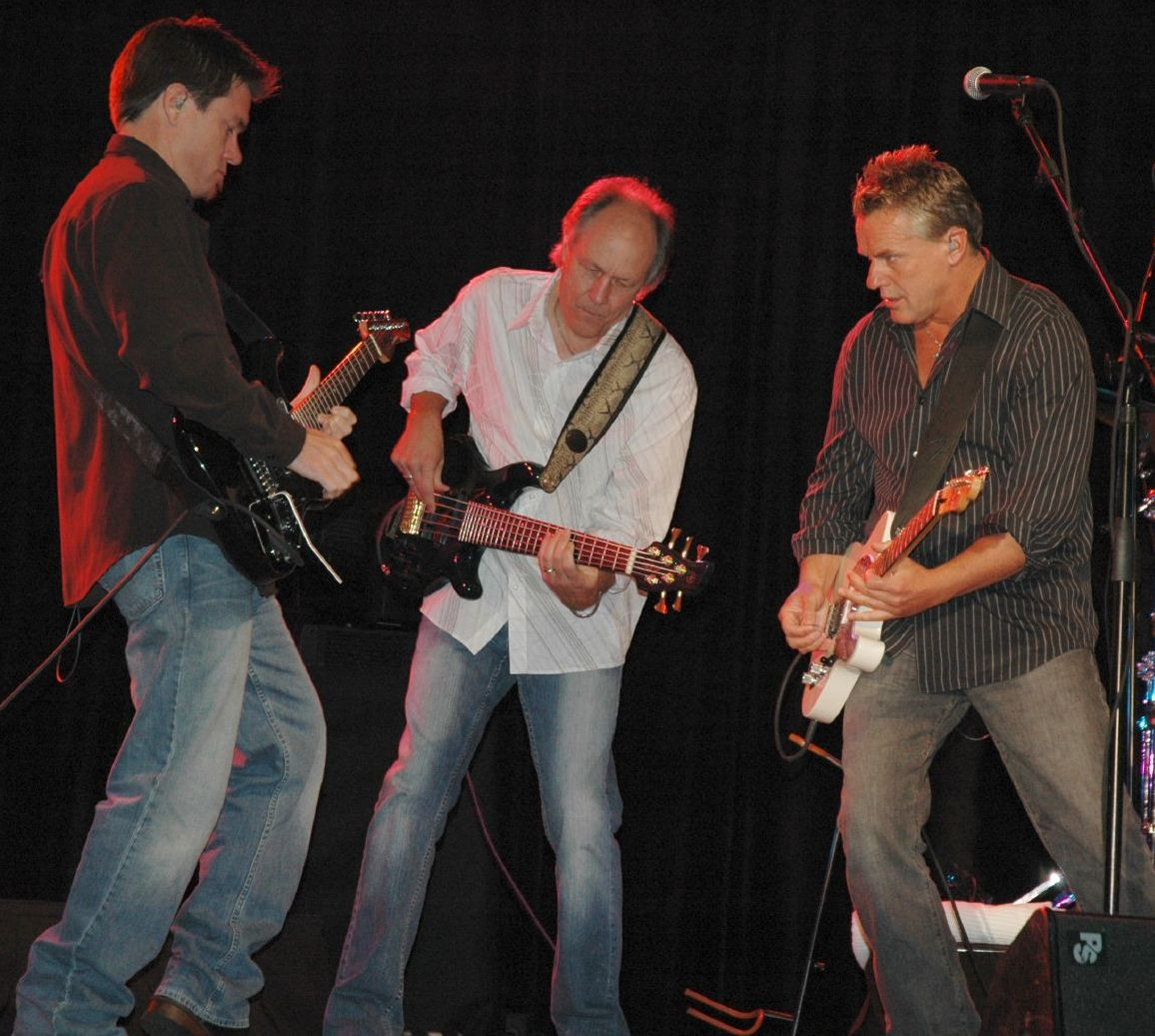
Members of Little River Band in 2004 (top) and 2006 (bottom)

Little River Band (LRB) were formed in Melbourne, Victoria, Australia, in March 1975. The original Australian group featured lead vocalist Glenn Shorrock, guitarists and vocalists Beeb Birtles and Graeham Goble, lead guitarist Ric Formosa, bassist Roger McLachlan and drummer Derek Pellicci. Since their formation, the band have been through numerous lineup changes. None of the original Australian band are members of the current American band which have legal use of the Little River Band name and trademarks. This band includes bassist and lead vocalist Wayne Nelson (from 1980 to 1996 and since 1999), keyboardist and vocalist Chris Marion (since 2004), drummer and vocalist Ryan Ricks (since 2012), guitarist and vocalist Colin Whinnery (since 2018) and guitarist and vocalist Bruce Wallace (since 2022).

== History ==
=== 1975–82 ===
LRB were formed in March 1975 by lead vocalist Glenn Shorrock, guitarist-vocalists Beeb Birtles and Graeham Goble, lead guitarist Ric Formosa, bassist Roger McLachlan and drummer Derek Pellicci. The previous month, before taking on its new name, the group had recorded a cover version of the Everly Brothers song "When Will I Be Loved" with lead guitarist Graham Davidge and bassist Dave Orams, however this remained unreleased until 1988 when it was featured on the compilation Too Late to Load. With the original lineup, LRB recorded its self-titled 1975 debut album and follow-up After Hours, before Formosa left in August 1976; he was replaced by David Briggs, while the group also brought in George McArdle to take over from McLachlan, with whom they "weren't 100 per cent happy".

With Briggs and McArdle, LRB achieved international success with the releases of Diamantina Cocktail in 1977 and Sleeper Catcher in 1978. For a world tour in the summer of 1978, Pellicci was temporarily replaced by Geoff Cox, a former bandmate of Briggs in the band Cycle, after suffering burn injuries which rendered him unable to perform. At the same time, Mal Logan was brought in as a touring keyboardist. Following Pellicci's return, the group recorded three shows in November 1978 for its first live album, Backstage Pass. At the end of January 1979, however, McArdle also left after converting to Christianity and deciding to attend Bible college full-time. He was not immediately replaced, with bass on First Under the Wire performed by session musicians Clive Harrison and Mike Clarke.

In July 1979, McArdle's official replacement was announced to be Barry Sullivan. He remained for less than a year, however, before former Jim Messina Band bassist Wayne Nelson took over in April 1980. The new lineup recorded Time Exposure in 1981, although before it was released Briggs left the group. He was replaced in August 1981 by Stephen Housden, formerly of Stevie Wright's band. Following a world tour which spawned the live video Live Exposure, frontman Shorrock left LRB in February 1982 to focus on his solo career. In subsequent years, Shorrock has claimed that he did not leave the band voluntarily, and was instead sacked. Nelson has supported the claim, suggesting that guitarist Beeb Birtles "voted to oust" the singer which led to the band subsequently "dismantling".

=== 1982–98 ===
Glenn Shorrock was replaced in February 1982 by John Farnham. His first recording with LRB was "The Other Guy", which was released on the compilation Greatest Hits. Following the release of The Net, the band added its first official keyboardist in David Hirschfelder, who joined in time for tour dates in September 1983. Within six months of his arrival, the group had lost two more founding members – Beeb Birtles left in October 1983 and Derek Pellicci followed in February 1984, both due to stylistic differences. Birtles was not replaced, while former Cold Chisel drummer Steve Prestwich took over from Pellicci ready for the recording of Playing to Win in July 1984. A second album, No Reins, followed in 1986.

For a short Australian tour in April 1986, Prestwich was replaced by touring drummer Malcolm Wakeford. However, this would prove to be the final tour with several band members, and the band's last activity for almost two years, as Farnham left in October that year to focus on his solo career. The group subsequently disbanded, citing "frustration over diminishing record sales and radio airplay". After months of rumours, LRB officially reformed in December 1987 with original lead singer Glenn Shorrock. Stephen Housden, Graeham Goble and Wayne Nelson returned from the 1986 lineup, alongside original drummer Derek Pellicci. James Roche joined as the band's touring keyboardist. This lineup issued Monsoon in 1988 and Get Lucky in 1990.

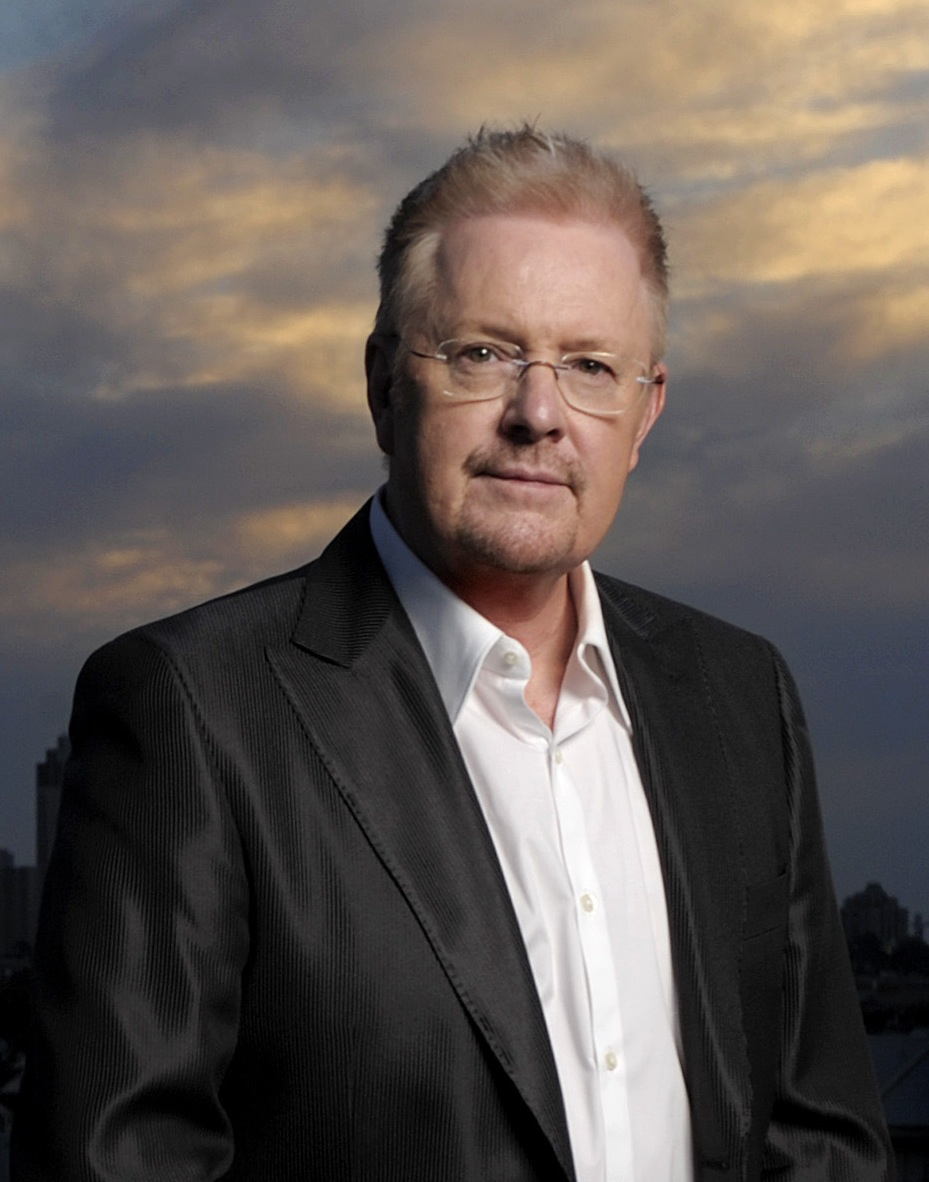
Graeham Goble became the last constant member to leave LRB when he ceased touring in April 1989, before leaving permanently in 1992.

Goble – now the sole constant member of LRB – performed his last shows with the band in April 1989. It was officially announced in March the next year that he would no longer tour with the group, in order to focus primarily on his side project Broken Voices. He was replaced by former Player frontman Peter Beckett, while Tony Sciuto joined as the group's new keyboardist. This lineup issued Worldwide Love in 1991, a compilation on which the title track was a new recording. By summer 1992, Goble had left permanently and Sciuto had been temporarily replaced by Richard Bryant. After a tour which spawned the live album Live Classics, Sciuto returned.

In 1996, both lead vocalists Shorrock and Nelson left LRB, replaced by Steve Wade and Hal Tupaea, respectively. After a touring cycle which ran until late 1997, Beckett left the band to return to Player, to which he also brought Sciuto. Pellicci also left for a second time, leaving the group with no founding members for the first time in its history. At this point, Stephen Housden acquired the rights to the LRB band name, after Shorrock reportedly declined an offer to rejoin the outfit.

=== Since 1998 ===
Retaining Steve Wade as frontman, Stephen Housden rebuilt LRB in early 1998 with the addition of Icehouse guitarist Paul Gildea, original LRB bassist Roger McLachlan, drummer Kevin Murphy and former Air Supply keyboardist Adrian Scott. McLachlan and Scott remained only for a year, before they were replaced in early 1999 by returning Wayne Nelson and new member Glenn Reither. One year later, Gildea was replaced by Greg Hind. Wade also left the group at the same time, at which point Nelson took over as the band's lead vocalist. This lineup issued the group's first studio album in 11 years, Where We Started From.

Shortly after the release of Test of Time in 2004, Reither was replaced by Chris Marion. Murphy was also briefly replaced by Kip Raines, although he was unable to commit to the band full-time and was himself replaced early the next year by Billy Thomas. In March 2006, LRB's longest-running continuous member Stephen Housden stepped down from touring, with Rich Herring brought in to take his place. This lineup released studio album Re-arranged and live collection Standing Room Only, before Thomas was replaced by Mel Watts in early 2007. Watts remained until early 2012, recording two Christmas albums with the group, before he was replaced by Ryan Ricks. During 2017, Hind was briefly unable to tour due to a carpal tunnel injury, with Colin Whinnery temporarily taking his place; Whinnery returned on a permanent basis early the next year, after Hind chose to leave following a series of family issues. In 2022, Bruce Wallace replaced Rich Herring on guitar and vocals.

== Members ==
=== Current ===
Image	Name	Years active	Instruments	Release contributions
	Wayne Nelson	1980–1986; 1987–1996; 1999–present	bass; vocals (co-lead until 2000, lead since 2000)	all Little River Band (LRB) releases from Time Exposure (1981) onwards
	Chris Marion	2004–present	keyboards; synthesisers; backing vocals	all LRB releases from Re-arranged (2006) onwards
	Ryan Ricks	2012–present	drums; percussion; backing vocals	Cuts Like a Diamond (2013); The Hits... Revisited (2016); Black Tie (2020)
	Colin Whinnery	2018–present	guitars; backing vocals	Black Tie (2020)
	Bruce Wallace	2022–present	guitars; backing vocals	Window to the World (2024)

=== Former ===
Image	Name	Years active	Instruments	Release contributions
	Graeham Goble	1975–1986; 1987–1992 (session only 1989–92)	rhythm and lead guitars; backing and lead vocals	all LRB releases from Little River Band (1975) to Get Lucky (1990)
	Derek Pellicci	1975–1984; 1987–1998	drums; percussion; backing vocals	all LRB releases from Little River Band (1975) to The Net (1983), and from Monsoon (1988) to Live Classics (1992)
	Beeb Birtles (Gerard Bertelkamp)	1975–1983	rhythm and lead guitars; lead and backing vocals	all LRB releases from Little River Band (1975) to The Net (1983)
	Glenn Shorrock	1975–1982; 1987–1996	lead vocals; harmonica; percussion; piano; acoustic guitar	all LRB releases from Little River Band (1975) to Live Exposure (1982), and from Monsoon (1988) to Live Classics (1992)
	Roger McLachlan	1975–1976; 1998–1999 (died 2025)	bass; backing vocals	Little River Band (1975); After Hours (1976)
	Ric Formosa	1975–1976	lead and slide guitars; backing and lead vocals	Little River Band (1975); After Hours (1976)
	David Briggs	1976–1981	lead and slide guitars	all LRB releases from Diamantina Cocktail (1977) to Time Exposure (1981)
	George McArdle	1976–1979	bass	Diamantina Cocktail (1977); Sleeper Catcher (1978); Backstage Pass (1980)
	Barry Sullivan	1979–1980 (died 2003)	bass	Live in America (1980)
	Stephen Housden	1981–2006	lead and slide guitars; backing vocals	all LRB releases from Live Exposure (1982) onwards
	John Farnham	1982–1986	lead vocals	"The Other Guy" (1982); The Net (1983); Playing to Win (1984); No Reins (1986)
	David Hirschfelder	1983–1986	keyboards; synthesisers; backing vocals	The Net (1983); Playing to Win (1984); No Reins (1986)
	Steve Prestwich	1984–1986 (died 2011)	drums; backing vocals	Playing to Win (1985); No Reins (1986)
	Peter Beckett	1990–1997	rhythm and lead guitars; backing vocals	"Worldwide Love" (1991); Live Classics (1992)
	Tony Sciuto	1990–1992; 1993–1997	keyboards; rhythm guitar; backing vocals	"Worldwide Love" (1991)
	Richard Bryant	1992–1993	keyboards; synthesisers; backing vocals	Live Classics (1992)
	Hal Tupaea	1992–1993 (touring only); 1996–1997	bass; backing vocals	none – live performances only
	Steve Wade	1996–2000	lead vocals; rhythm guitar	none – live performances only
	Kevin Murphy	1998–2004	drums; percussion; additional vocals	Where We Started From (2001); One Night in Mississippi (2002); Test of Time (2004)
	Paul Gildea	1998–2000	rhythm and lead guitars; backing vocals	Where We Started From (2001) – one track only
	Adrian Scott	1998–1999	keyboards; synthesisers; backing vocals	none – live performances only
	Glenn Reither	1999–2004	keyboards; saxophones; backing vocals	Where We Started From (2001); One Night in Mississippi (2002); Test of Time (2004)
	Greg Hind	2000–2018	rhythm and lead guitars; backing vocals	all LRB releases from Where We Started From (2001) to Cuts Like a Diamond (2013)
	Kip Raines	2004–2005	drums; percussion; backing vocals	all LRB releases from Re-arranged (2006) to A Little River Band Christmas (2011)
	Billy Thomas	2005–2007	drums; percussion; backing vocals	Re-arranged (2006); Standing Room Only (2007)
	Rich Herring	2006–present	lead and rhythm guitars; backing vocals	all LRB releases from Re-arranged (2006) onwards
	Mel Watts	2007–2012	drums; percussion; backing vocals	We Call It Christmas (2008); Outback (2009); A Little River Band Christmas (2011)

=== Touring ===
Image	Name	Years active	Instruments	Release contributions
	Mal Logan	1978–1982	keyboards; synthesisers; backing vocals	Logan served as LRB's touring keyboardist between 1978 and 1982. He also performed on Sleeper Catcher.
	Geoff Cox	1978 (substitute)	drums	Cox temporarily replaced Derek Pellicci, who had suffered injury, for tour dates between June and October 1978.
	Malcolm Wakeford	1986	drums	Wakeford took over from Steve Prestwich for a short Australian tour in April 1986, before the band went on hiatus.
	James Roche	1988–1990	keyboards; synthesisers; backing vocals	Roche joined as touring keyboardist when the band reformed in 1988, performing with the group for two years.

== Timelines ==
=== Recording ===
Album	Lead vocals	Lead guitar	Guitar, vocals	Bass	Drums	Keyboards
Little River Band (1975)	Glenn Shorrock	Ric Formosa	Graeham Goble, Beeb Birtles	Roger McLachlan	Derek Pellicci	session musicians
After Hours (1976)	Glenn Shorrock	Ric Formosa	Graeham Goble, Beeb Birtles	Roger McLachlan	Derek Pellicci	session musicians
Diamantina Cocktail (1977)	Glenn Shorrock	David Briggs	Graeham Goble, Beeb Birtles	George McArdle	Derek Pellicci	session musicians
Sleeper Catcher (1978)	Glenn Shorrock	David Briggs	Graeham Goble, Beeb Birtles	George McArdle	Derek Pellicci	session musicians
First Under the Wire (1979)	Glenn Shorrock	David Briggs	Graeham Goble, Beeb Birtles	session musicians	Derek Pellicci	session musicians
Time Exposure (1981)	Glenn Shorrock	David Briggs	Graeham Goble, Beeb Birtles	Wayne Nelson	Derek Pellicci	session musicians
The Net (1983)	John Farnham	Stephen Housden	Graeham Goble, Beeb Birtles	Wayne Nelson	Derek Pellicci	David Hirschfelder
Playing to Win (1984)	John Farnham	Stephen Housden	Graeham Goble	Wayne Nelson	Steve Prestwich	David Hirschfelder
No Reins (1986)	John Farnham	Stephen Housden	Graeham Goble	Wayne Nelson	Steve Prestwich	David Hirschfelder
Monsoon (1988)	Glenn Shorrock	Stephen Housden	Graeham Goble	Wayne Nelson	Derek Pellicci	session musicians
Get Lucky (1990)	Glenn Shorrock	Stephen Housden	Graeham Goble	Wayne Nelson	Derek Pellicci	session musicians
Where We Started From (2001)	Wayne Nelson	Stephen Housden	Greg Hind	Wayne Nelson	Kevin Murphy	Glenn Reither
Test of Time (2005)	Wayne Nelson	Stephen Housden	Greg Hind	Wayne Nelson	Kevin Murphy	Glenn Reither
Re-arranged (2006)	Wayne Nelson	Rich Herring	Greg Hind	Wayne Nelson	Billy Thomas	Chris Marion
We Call It Christmas (2008)	Wayne Nelson	Rich Herring	Greg Hind	Wayne Nelson	Mel Watts	Chris Marion
A Little River Band Christmas (2011)	Wayne Nelson	Rich Herring	Greg Hind	Wayne Nelson	Mel Watts	Chris Marion
Cuts Like a Diamond (2013)	Wayne Nelson	Rich Herring	Greg Hind	Wayne Nelson	Ryan Ricks	Chris Marion
The Hits... Revisited (2016)	Wayne Nelson	Rich Herring	Greg Hind	Wayne Nelson	Ryan Ricks	Chris Marion
Black Tie (2020)	Wayne Nelson	Rich Herring	Colin Whinnery	Wayne Nelson	Ryan Ricks	Chris Marion

== Lineups ==
Period	Members	Releases
February – March 1975 (rehearsals and initial shows as Mississippi)	Glenn Shorrock – lead vocals; Graham Davidge – lead guitar, vocals; Beeb Birtles – rhythm guitar, vocals; Graeham Goble – rhythm guitar, vocals; Dave Orams – bass, vocals; Derek Pellicci – drums, percussion, vocals	"When Will I Be Loved" (1988)
March 1975 – August 1976	Glenn Shorrock – lead vocals; Ric Formosa – lead guitar, vocals; Beeb Birtles – rhythm guitar, vocals; Graeham Goble – rhythm guitar, vocals; Roger McLachlan – bass, vocals; Derek Pellicci – drums, percussion, vocals	Little River Band (1975); After Hours (1976)
August 1976 – January 1979	Glenn Shorrock – lead vocals; David Briggs – lead guitar; Beeb Birtles – rhythm guitar, vocals; Graeham Goble – rhythm guitar, vocals; George McArdle – bass; Derek Pellicci – drums, percussion, vocals	Diamantina Cocktail (1977); Sleeper Catcher (1978); Backstage Pass (1980)
February – July 1979	Glenn Shorrock – lead vocals; David Briggs – lead guitar; Beeb Birtles – rhythm guitar, vocals; Graeham Goble – rhythm guitar, vocals; Derek Pellicci – drums, percussion, vocals	First Under the Wire (1979)
July 1979 – April 1980	Glenn Shorrock – lead vocals; David Briggs – lead guitar; Beeb Birtles – rhythm guitar, vocals; Graeham Goble – rhythm guitar, vocals; Barry Sullivan – bass; Derek Pellicci – drums, percussion, vocals	Live in America (1980)
April 1980 – August 1981	Glenn Shorrock – lead vocals; David Briggs – lead guitar; Beeb Birtles – rhythm guitar, vocals; Graeham Goble – rhythm guitar, vocals; Wayne Nelson – bass, vocals; Derek Pellicci – drums, percussion, vocals	Time Exposure (1981)
August 1981 – February 1982	Glenn Shorrock – lead vocals; Stephen Housden – lead guitar, vocals; Beeb Birtles – rhythm guitar, vocals; Graeham Goble – rhythm guitar, vocals; Wayne Nelson – bass, vocals; Derek Pellicci – drums, percussion, vocals	Live Exposure (1982)
February 1982 – September 1983	John Farnham – lead vocals; Stephen Housden – lead guitar, vocals; Beeb Birtles – rhythm guitar, vocals; Graeham Goble – rhythm guitar, vocals; Wayne Nelson – bass, vocals; Derek Pellicci – drums, percussion, vocals	"The Other Guy" (1982); The Net (1983)
September – October 1983	John Farnham – lead vocals; Stephen Housden – lead guitar, vocals; Beeb Birtles – rhythm guitar, vocals; Graeham Goble – rhythm guitar, vocals; Wayne Nelson – bass, vocals; Derek Pellicci – drums, percussion, vocals; David Hirschfelder – keyboards, vocals	none
October 1983 – February 1984	John Farnham – lead vocals; Stephen Housden – lead guitar, vocals; Graeham Goble – rhythm guitar, vocals; Wayne Nelson – bass, vocals; Derek Pellicci – drums, percussion, vocals; David Hirschfelder – keyboards, vocals	none
July 1984 – April 1986	John Farnham – lead vocals; Stephen Housden – lead guitar, vocals; Graeham Goble – rhythm guitar, vocals; Wayne Nelson – bass, vocals; Steve Prestwich – drums; David Hirschfelder – keyboards, vocals	Playing to Win (1985); No Reins (1986)
April – October 1986	John Farnham – lead vocals; Stephen Housden – lead guitar, vocals; Graeham Goble – rhythm guitar, vocals; Wayne Nelson – bass, vocals; David Hirschfelder – keyboards, vocals	none
Band inactive October 1986 – December 1987
December 1987 – April 1989	Glenn Shorrock – lead vocals; Stephen Housden – lead guitar, vocals; Graeham Goble – rhythm guitar, vocals; Wayne Nelson – bass, vocals; Derek Pellicci – drums, percussion, vocals	Monsoon (1988); Get Lucky (1990)
Late 1989 – early 1990	Glenn Shorrock – lead vocals; Stephen Housden – lead guitar, vocals; Peter Beckett – rhythm guitar, vocals; Wayne Nelson – bass, vocals; Derek Pellicci – drums, percussion, vocals	none
Early 1990 – summer 1992	Glenn Shorrock – lead vocals; Stephen Housden – lead guitar, vocals; Peter Beckett – rhythm guitar, vocals; Wayne Nelson – bass, vocals; Derek Pellicci – drums, percussion, vocals; Tony Sciuto – keyboards, guitar, vocals	"Worldwide Love" (1991)
1992–1993	Glenn Shorrock – lead vocals; Stephen Housden – lead guitar, vocals; Peter Beckett – rhythm guitar, vocals; Wayne Nelson – bass, vocals; Derek Pellicci – drums, percussion, vocals; Richard Bryant – keyboards, vocals	Live Classics (1992)
1993–1996	Glenn Shorrock – lead vocals; Stephen Housden – lead guitar, vocals; Peter Beckett – rhythm guitar, vocals; Wayne Nelson – bass, vocals; Derek Pellicci – drums, percussion, vocals; Tony Sciuto – keyboards, guitar, vocals	none
Spring 1996 – late 1997	Steve Wade – lead vocals, rhythm guitar; Stephen Housden – lead guitar, vocals; Peter Beckett – rhythm guitar, vocals; Hal Tupaea – bass, vocals; Derek Pellicci – drums, percussion, vocals; Tony Sciuto – keyboards, rhythm guitar, vocals	none
Spring 1998 – early 1999	Steve Wade – lead vocals, rhythm guitar; Stephen Housden – lead guitar, vocals; Paul Gildea – rhythm guitar, vocals; Roger McLachlan – bass, vocals; Kevin Murphy – drums, percussion, vocals; Adrian Scott – keyboards, vocals	none
Early 1999 – early 2000 (No longer any original members in the lineup)	Steve Wade – lead vocals, rhythm guitar; Stephen Housden – lead guitar, vocals; Paul Gildea – rhythm guitar, vocals; Wayne Nelson – bass, vocals; Kevin Murphy – drums, percussion, vocals; Glenn Reither – keyboards, saxophone, vocals	Where We Started From (2001) – one track
Early 2000 – late 2004	Wayne Nelson – lead vocals, bass; Stephen Housden – lead guitar, vocals; Greg Hind – rhythm guitar, vocals; Kevin Murphy – drums, percussion, vocals; Glenn Reither – keyboards, saxophone, vocals	Where We Started From (2001); One Night in Mississippi (2002); Test of Time (2004)
Late 2004 – early 2005	Wayne Nelson – lead vocals, bass; Stephen Housden – lead guitar, vocals; Greg Hind – rhythm guitar, vocals; Kip Raines – drums, percussion, vocals; Chris Marion – keyboards, vocals	none
Early 2005 – March 2006	Wayne Nelson – lead vocals, bass; Stephen Housden – lead guitar, vocals; Greg Hind – rhythm guitar, vocals; Billy Thomas – drums, percussion, vocals; Chris Marion – keyboards, vocals	none
March 2006 – early 2007	Wayne Nelson – lead vocals, bass; Rich Herring – lead guitar, vocals; Greg Hind – rhythm guitar, vocals; Billy Thomas – drums, percussion, vocals; Chris Marion – keyboards, vocals	Re-arranged (2006); Standing Room Only (2007)
Early 2007 – early 2012	Wayne Nelson – lead vocals, bass; Rich Herring – lead guitar, vocals; Greg Hind – rhythm guitar, vocals; Mel Watts – drums, percussion; Chris Marion – keyboards, vocals	We Call It Christmas (2008); Outback (2009); A Little River Band Christmas (2011)
Early 2012 – early 2018	Wayne Nelson – lead vocals, bass; Rich Herring – lead guitar, vocals; Greg Hind – rhythm guitar, vocals; Ryan Ricks – drums, percussion, vocals; Chris Marion – keyboards, vocals	Cuts Like a Diamond (2013); The Hits... Revisited (2016)
Early 2018 – early 2022 (No longer any Australians in the lineup)	Wayne Nelson – lead vocals, bass; Rich Herring – lead guitar, vocals; Colin Whinnery – rhythm guitar, vocals; Ryan Ricks – drums, percussion, vocals; Chris Marion – keyboards, vocals	Black Tie (2020)
Early 2022 – present	Wayne Nelson – lead vocals, bass; Colin Whinnery – lead guitar, vocals; Bruce Wallace – rhythm guitar, vocals; Ryan Ricks – drums, percussion, vocals; Chris Marion – keyboards, vocals	Window to the World (2024)
