= List of awards and nominations received by Little River Band =

Little River Band are a rock band that was formed in Melbourne, Australia, in 1975. The founding members include Beeb Birtles, Graeham Goble, Derek Pellicci and Glenn Shorrock. They have undergone numerous personnel changes, with over 30 members since their formation. The group have released 16 studio albums and have won numerous awards in Australia. In May 2001 the Australasian Performing Right Association (APRA), as part of its 75th anniversary celebrations, named "Cool Change", written by Shorrock, as one of the Top 30 Australian songs of all time. The 1976 line-up of Goble, Shorrock, Birtles, Pellicci, David Briggs and George McArdle, were inducted into the Australian Recording Industry Association (ARIA) Hall of Fame at the 18th Annual ARIA Music Awards of 2004. Little River Band are based in the United States and have no original members since 1998.

== APRA Awards ==
Year	Nominee / work	Award	Result
1982	"Reminiscing" – Graeham Goble	Gold Award	Won
1982	"Cool Change" – Glenn Shorrock	Gold Award	Won
1984	"The Other Guy" - Graeham Goble	Most Played Australasian Popular Work	Won
1985	"The Other Guy" - Graeham Goble	Special Award	Won
2001	"Cool Change" – Glenn Shorrock	Top 30 Australian songs	listed

== ARIA Awards ==
Year	Nominee / work	Award	Result
2004	Little River Band	Hall of Fame	inductee

== Australian Rock Music Awards ==
Year	Nominee / work	Award	Result
1978	Little River Band	Best Live Rock Act	Won
1978	Little River Band	Best Recording Group	Won
1978	Little River Band	Most Popular Group	Won
1978	Glenn Shorrock	Best Male Singer	Won
1978	Glenn Shorrock	Best Composer	Nominated
1978	Glenn Shorrock	Rock Hero	Won
1978	Beeb Birtles	Best Composer	Nominated
1978	David Briggs	Best Guitarist	Nominated
1978	George McArdle	Best Bassist	Nominated
1978	Derek Pellicci	Best Drummer	Nominated
1978	Diamantina Cocktail	Best Album Cover	Won
1978	Diamantina Cocktail	Best Album	Won
1978	Glenn Wheatley	Manager of the Year	Nominated
1978	"Help Is on Its Way"	Best Single	Won

== BMI Awards ==
Year	Nominee	Award	Work
2014	Graeham Goble	5 Million Broadcast Citation	"Reminiscing"
2014	Graeham Goble	4 Million Broadcast Citation	"Lady"
2014	Graeham Goble	1 Million Broadcast Citation	"The Other Guy"
2014	Graeham Goble	1 Million Broadcast Citation	"Take It Easy On Me"
2018	Glenn Shorrock	2 Million Broadcast Citation	"Cool Change"
2019	David Briggs	3 Million Broadcast Citation	"Lonesome Loser"
2020	Graeham Goble	1 Million Broadcast Citation	"The Night Owls"

== Grammy Awards ==
Year	Nominee / work	Award	Result
1979	"Lonesome Loser"	Best Pop Vocal Performance by a Duo, Group or Chorus	Nominated

== Mo Awards ==
The Australian Entertainment Mo Awards (commonly known informally as the Mo Awards), were annual Australian entertainment industry awards. They recognise achievements in live entertainment in Australia from 1975 to 2016.

Year	Nominee / work	Award	Result (wins only)
1985	Little River Band	Best Rock Group of the Year	Won

== TV Week King of Pop Awards ==
Year	Nominee / work	Award	Result
1977	"Help Is on Its Way"	Australian Record of the Year	Won
1977	Little River Band	Best Australian International Performers	Won
1977	Glenn Shorrock	Best Australian Songwriter	Won
1978	"Reminiscing"	Australian Record of the Year	Won
1978	"Help Is on Its Way" on Paul Hogan Show	Best Australian TV Performer	Won
1978	Sleeper Catcher	Most Popular Australian Album	Won

== TV Week / Countdown Music Awards ==
Year	Nominee / work	Award	Result
1979	First Under the Wire	Best Australian Album	Won
1979	"Lonesome Loser"	Best Australian Singles	Nominated
1979	Little River Band	Most Outstanding Achievement	Won
1979	Little River Band	Most Popular Group	Won
