= Live Exposure =

Video by Little River Band
- Released: 1981 (VHS); 2008 (DVD)
- Recorded: 7 October 1981; The Summit, Houston, Texas
- Length: 75 minutes
- Label: Capitol/EMI
- Director: Derek Burbridge

Live Exposure is a video by Little River Band, filmed at a live concert at The Summit in Houston, Texas on 7 October 1981.

Live Exposure was first released on VHS in 1981, on Laserdisc in 1982 and subsequently released on DVD in 2008

== Track listing ==
1. "It's A Long Way There" – Goble (from the album Little River Band)
2. "Man On Your Mind" – Shorrock/Tolhurst (Time Exposure)
3. "Mistress Of Mine" – Goble (First Under the Wire)
4. "Happy Anniversary" – Birtles/Briggs (Diamantina Cocktail)
5. "Don't Let The Needle Win" – Briggs (Time Exposure)
6. "Reminiscing" – Goble (Sleeper Catcher)
7. "Ballerina" – Birtles/Goble (Time Exposure)
8. "Cool Change" – Shorrock (First Under the Wire)
9. "The Night Owls" – Goble (Time Exposure)
10. "Help Is on Its Way" – Shorrock (Diamantina Cocktail)
11. "Lonesome Loser" – Briggs ([First Under the Wire)
12. "It's Not A Wonder" – Goble (First Under the Wire)
13. "Lady" – Goble (Sleeper Catcher)
14. "Just Say That You Love Me" – Goble (Time Exposure)

== Personnel ==
Cover of the original VHS video.

Little River Band

- Glenn Shorrock – lead vocal
- Graeham Goble – harmony vocals, acoustic and electric guitars
- Beeb Birtles – lead and harmony vocals, acoustic and electric guitars
- Derek Pellicci – drums
- Wayne Nelson – bass, lead and harmony vocals
- Stephen Housden – lead guitar
- Mal Logan – keyboards

== Charts ==
Chart (2009/10)	Peak position
Australia (ARIA)	23

== Reviews ==
- Fulvue Drive-in
