= The Classic Collection =

Greatest hits album by Little River Band
- Released: November 1992
- Recorded: 1975–1985, 1992
- Genre: Adult contemporary; rock; pop rock
- Length: 70.36
- Label: EMI
- Producer: Little River Band

Little River Band chronology
Live Classics (1992)	The Classic Collection (1992)	Forever Blue: The Very Best Of (2005)

The Classic Collection is a greatest hits compilation by Australian rock group Little River Band, released in November 1992.

The album peaked at number one in New Zealand in 1993 and at number eight on the ARIA chart in 1995 where it was certified platinum.

Professional ratings
Review scores
Source	Rating
AllMusic	4/5 stars

== Track listing ==
No.	Title	Writer(s)	Length
1.	"It's a Long Way There" (single version)	Graeham Goble	4:12
2.	"Emma"	Glenn Shorrock	3:35
3.	"Curiosity (Killed the Cat)"	Beeb Birtles	3:40
4.	"Help Is on Its Way"	Shorrock	4:04
5.	"Home on Monday"	Birtles, Shorrock	3:53
6.	"Happy Anniversary"	Birtles, David Briggs	4:03
7.	"Reminiscing"	Goble	4:11
8.	"Shut Down Turn Off"	Shorrock	3:55
9.	"Lonesome Loser"	Briggs	3:58
10.	"Cool Change"	Shorrock	5:14
11.	"Long Jumping Jeweller"	Shorrock	4:447
12.	"The Night Owls"	Goble	5:07
13.	"Down on the Border"	Goble	2:52
14.	"Lady" (single version)	Goble	3:34
15.	"The Other Guy"	Goble	2:49
16.	"Playing to Win"	Farnham, Goble	2:51
17.	"Walk Together"	David Froggatt, Brent Thomas	3:25
18.	"My Own Way Home"	Shorrock, Brian Cadd	4:14

== Charts ==
=== Weekly charts ===
Chart (1992–1995)	Peak position
Australian Albums (ARIA)	8
New Zealand Albums (RMNZ)	1

=== Year-end charts ===
Chart (1993)	Position
New Zealand Albums (RMNZ)	22
Chart (1995)	Position
Australian Albums (ARIA)	87

== Certifications ==
Region	Certification	Certified units/sales
Australia (ARIA)	Platinum	70,000^{^}
^{^} Shipments figures based on certification alone.

== See also ==
- List of number-one albums from the 1990s (New Zealand)
