= Live Classics =

Live album by Little River Band
- Released: 1992
- Recorded: 1992
- Genre: Rock
- Length: 76:01
- Language: English
- Label: EMI
- Producer: David J. Holman, Little River Band

Little River Band chronology
| Worldwide Love (1991) | Live Classics (1992) | The Classic Collection (1992) |

Professional ratings
Review scores
| Source | Rating |
|---|---|
| AllMusic | 3/5 stars |

Live Classics is a live album by Australian band Little River Band. It was recorded during their 1992 world tour. The album included two new studio songs, "Walk Together" and "My Own Way Home". It was the last Little River Band album (other than subsequent compilations) with founder Glenn Shorrock as lead vocalist.

== Background and release ==
During 1992 Little River Band went on an extensive worldwide tour throughout Europe and the United States. Live Classics was recorded during the tour. It was dedicated to Wayne Nelson's daughter Aubree who, at the age of 13, died in a car crash that year.

== Track listing ==
1. "Happy Anniversary" – Birtles, Briggs (4:50)
2. "It's a Long Way There" – Goble (4:19)
3. "I Dream Alone" – Pellicci, Shorrock (5:56)
4. "Skyboat" – Trad. (1:30)
5. "Man on Your Mind" – Shorrock, Tolhurst (3:54)
6. "Lonesome Loser" – Briggs (4:00)
7. "Take It Easy on Me" – Goble (4:03)
8. "Reminiscing" – Goble (6:48)
9. "Baby Come Back" – Beckett, Crowley (5:08)
10. "Walk Together" – Froggatt, Thomas (3:42)
11. "The Night Owls" – Goble (5:31)
12. "Help Is on Its Way" – Shorrock (4:24)
13. "Cool Change" – Shorrock (5:43)
14. "Lady" – Goble (4:11)
15. "Summertime Blues" – Capehart, Cochran (4:16)
16. "Walk Together" [Studio] – Froggatt, Thomas (3:30)
17. "My Own Way Home" [Studio] – Cadd, Shorrock (4:16)

== Personnel ==
Little River Band

- Glenn Shorrock - lead vocals
- Wayne Nelson - bass guitar, vocals
- Derek Pellicci - drums
- Stephen Housden - lead guitar
- Peter Beckett - guitar, vocals
- Richard Bryant - keyboards, vocals
