= Backstage Pass (album) =

Live album by Little River Band
- Released: October 1979
- Recorded: November 1978
- Venue: Festival Theatre
- Studio: The Adelaide Festival Theatre
- Genre: Rock
- Language: English
- Label: EMI
- Producers: Little River Band & Ernie Rose

Little River Band chronology
First Under the Wire (1979)	Backstage Pass (1979)	Live in America (1980)

Backstage Pass is a first live album by Australian group Little River Band. The album was recorded by the Australian Broadcasting Commission at the Adelaide Festival Theatre in November 1978 and released in October 1979. It peaked at No. 18 on the Australian Kent Music Report

The album was released in United States as a double album in March 1980, including the group's next live album, Live in America.

== Reception ==
Cash Box magazine said "This fine live package was recorded partly in Australia with the Adelaide Symphony Orchestra and partly during The Little River Band's 1979 North American tour, it is a splendid show- case of this versatile band's talents as the Aussie fivesome swims deftly through a sea of styles — folk, rock, country and A/C."

== Track listing ==
Side A

1. "It's a Long Way There" (Graham Goble) - 8:55
2. "So Many Paths" (Glenn Shorrock, Ignatius Jones) - 4:36
3. "Statue of Liberty" (Glenn Shorrock) - 3:24
4. "Fall from Paradise" (Beeb Birtles, Graham Goble) - 6:13

Side B

1. "Light of Day" (Beeb Birtles) 9:43
2. "Night and Day" (Intro) (Cole Porter) / "Reminiscing" (Graham Goble) - 4:16
3. "The Man in Black" (Glenn Shorrock) - 4:37
4. "Help Is on Its Way" (Glenn Shorrock) - 3:54

== Personnel ==
Little River Band

- Glenn Shorrock - lead vocals
- Graeham Goble - guitarist, backing vocals
- Beeb Birtles - guitar, backing vocals
- David Briggs - lead guitar
- Derek Pellicci - drums

Additional personnel Record 1:

- George McArdle - bass guitar
- Adelaide Symphony Orchestra conducted by David Measham

Additional personnel Record 2:

- Barry Sullivan - bass guitar
- Mal Logan - keyboards

== Charts ==
Chart (1979/80)	Peak position
Australia (Kent Music Report)	18
Canada Top Albums/CDs (RPM)	34
New Zealand Albums (RMNZ)	50
US Billboard 200	44

== Certifications ==
Region	Certification	Certified units/sales
Australia (ARIA)	Platinum	50,000^{^}
^{^} Shipments figures based on certification alone.
