= Live in America (Little River Band album) =

Live album by Little River Band
- Released: April 1980
- Genre: Rock
- Label: Capitol
- Producer: Little River Band, Ernie Rose

Little River Band chronology
Backstage Pass (1979)	Live in America (1980)	Time Exposure (1981)

Singles from Live in America
- 1. "Red Shoes" Released: April 1980

Live in America is a second live album by Australian group, Little River Band. The album was released in April 1980 and peaked at No. 35 on the Australian Kent Music Report.

== Track listing ==
Side A

1. "Hard Life" (Graham Goble) - 4:22
2. "The Rumor" (Glenn Shorrock) - 4:04
3. "Mistress of Mine" (Goble) - 5:36
4. "Too Lonely Too Long" (Goble) - 3:04
5. "Red Shoes" (Beeb Birtles) - 4:29

Side B

1. "I Don't Worry No More" (Birtles) - 4:10
2. "Let's Dance" (David Briggs) - 3:31
3. "Man On the Run" (Birtles, Goble) - 3:57
4. "It's Not a Wonder" (Goble) - 4:24
5. "Sweet Old Fashioned Man" (Shorrock) - 4:29

== Charts ==
Chart (1980)	Peak position
Australia (Kent Music Report)	35
