= Birtles Shorrock Goble =

Australian pop/rock group

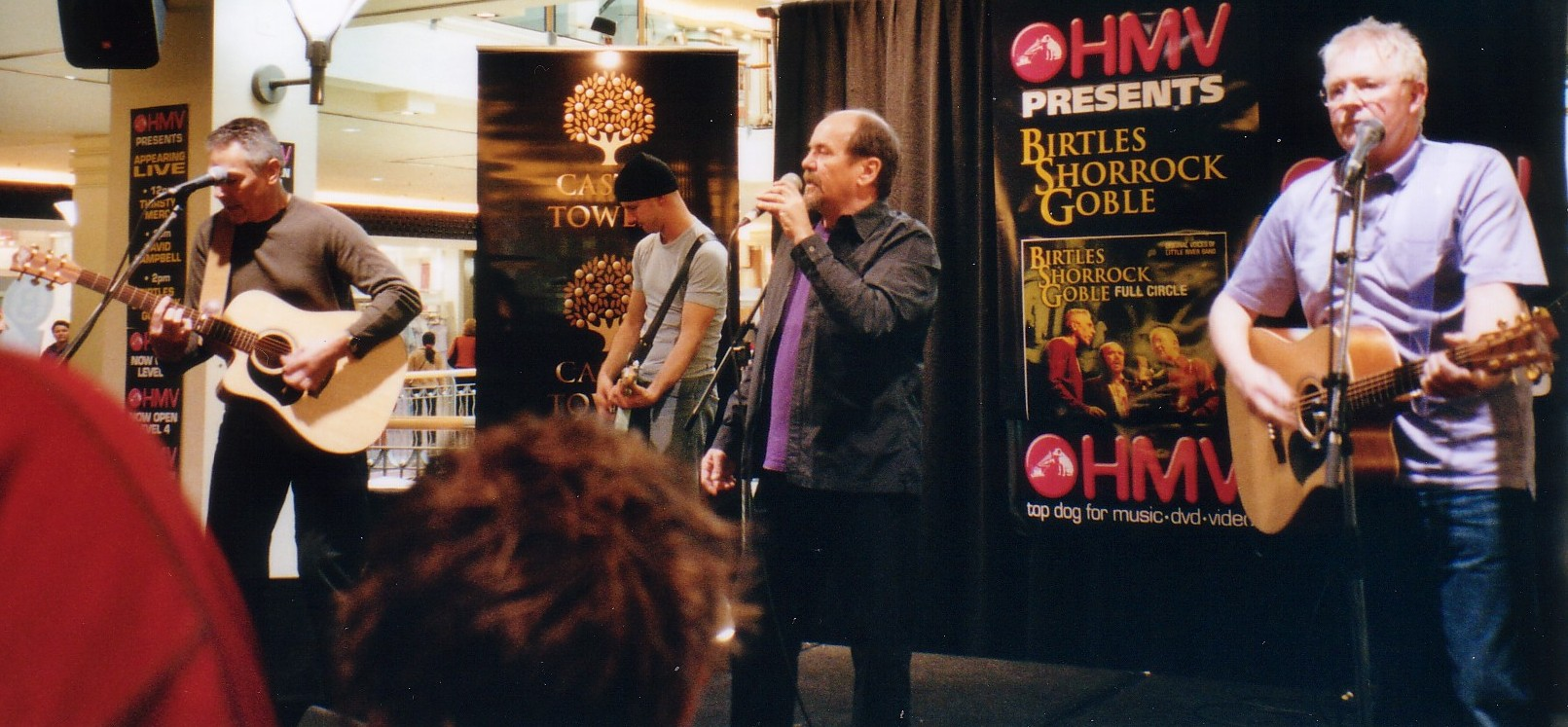
- BSG perform at Castle Towers, Sydney, Australia

Background information
- Also known as: BSG
- Genres: Pop rock, soft rock
- Years active: 2001–2007
- Labels: Universal, Capitol
- Past members: Beeb Birtles; Glenn Shorrock; Graeham Goble
- Website: shorrockbirtlesgoble.com

Birtles Shorrock Goble were an Australian pop/rock group composed of the three original singers and songwriters of Little River Band, namely Beeb Birtles, Glenn Shorrock and Graeham Goble. The members are known for their extensive writing and performance of hit songs and distinctive vocal harmonies. They are sometimes referred to by the initials BSG.

== History ==
=== Background and Little River Band ===
Birtles, Shorrock and Goble were members of popular Australian bands before forming Little River Band in 1974, which became one of Australia's first supergroups, achieving gold and platinum awards and multi-million international record sales and top 10 hits in the US for five consecutive years (1978–1982).

Birtles, Shorrock and Graeham Goble left Little River Band at different times and for different reasons.

Shorrock left in 1982, Birtles in 1983 and Goble retired with the band in 1989.

Following their departures from the band, Birtles, Shorrock and Goble continued to maintain careers in the music industry.

=== 2001-2007: BSG ===
On 28 May 2001, Shorrock and Goble were seated at the same table at the Australian APRA Awards. A reunion was first discussed after record producer Paul Rodger approached Graeham Goble and Derek Pellicci with interest from Warner Music to produce a video concert like the Eagles' Hell Freezes Over. Subsequent telephone calls to Birtles and Shorrock confirmed that they, too, were not averse to a reunion.

The initial plans provided for Birtles, Shorrock, Goble, Pellicci, David Briggs, and George McArdle to re-form under the band name The Original Little River Band. Those plans were quickly thwarted when former Little River Band manager Glenn Wheatley told Birtles, Shorrock, and Goble that things would be a lot easier if they reformed on their own. It was determined that the name Little River Band and associated logos had been transferred by Wheatley and Goble to a company owned by LRB lead guitarist Stephen Housden without the permission of the other members of the band. (See Legal battles.)

Wheatley decided that the three singer/songwriters would henceforth appear as Birtles Shorrock Goble: The Founding Members of Little River Band. ("Not BSG," said Shorrock, "it sounds like something you get at a Chinese restaurant.")

The first public performance of the reformed group occurred on 1 March 2002 at the Australian Grand Prix Ball. The hour-long set of twelve songs reprised many of their international hits.

In March 2003, Birtles Shorrock Goble appointed Paul Rodger as their manager and signed a recording contract with Universal Music Australia. The group recorded their live performance at The Forum in Melbourne and released it as the live album, Full Circle. The concert showcased Little River Band tracks, and new songs written by each of the members.

In August–September 2007 Birtles Shorrock Goble toured Australia with the Countdown Spectacular 2, which reacquainted Australian fans with many of the outstanding performers who appeared on the iconic television program Countdown. Birtles Shorrock Goble were given penultimate billing before Rick Springfield, Birtles' former bandmate in Zoot. BSG performed a LRB medley consisting of eight hits.

In September 2007, Birtles Shorrock Goble performed at the 2007 AFL Grand Final.

=== 2008-present: The Future ===
Since 2007, there have been no further Birtles Shorrock Goble shows. While there has never been an official announcement of Birtles Shorrock Goble disbanding, when asked in 2010 if they would perform again, Shorrock replied "No... The door is locked, but I have the key... I don't feel the need to go back and be married to those guys again. We had a stormy marriage [but] a great marriage."

== Legal battles ==
The seeds of future legal conflict were sown in 1987: with a new line-up and new recording company, the members of Little River Band formed a "clean slate" company known as We Two Pty Ltd. The five band members at that time were made equal shareholders. Band assets, including the name and logo, were transferred into this company. Goble acknowledges that mistakes were made:

"The LRB name was never 'for sale'. It was lost to Stephen Housden because of a legal document that transferred the name to We Two Pty. Ltd. The name should have been licensed, not transferred. We were ill-advised and totally unaware of what we were leaving behind." Graeham Goble (2005)

As the other members left over time, by 1997 Housden was the sole remaining member and ownership of We Two Pty Ltd (including rights to the name Little River Band) passed to him. He formed a new band which, with various personnel changes, is called the Little River Band and continues to tour North America.

When Birtles, Shorrock and Goble initially proposed to re-form as The Original Little River Band, Housden asserted his rights to the name and took the matter to the Federal Court of Australia (see We Two Pty Ltd v Shorrock (2002)). In an out-of-court settlement, it was agreed that Birtles, Shorrock and Goble would not use the trade mark (name) or logo as the name of their band, or in the name of their band, but "shall be entitled to refer prominently but always only in a descriptive way in promotional and advertising material, to the fact that they were members of the original line up of the Little River Band".

Loss of access to the LRB name for Birtles, Shorrock and Goble came as a shock to many fans and received considerable attention in the Australian media.

The settlement would be tested repeatedly, including the blocking of a Little River Band retrospective DVD put together by Birtles, Shorrock and Goble. Housden also challenged the manner in which BSG described their link to LRB in promotional material and recordings. Further legal action ensued in Australia and in the United States.

== Discography ==
=== Albums ===
Title	Album details	Certification
Full Circle	Released: 6 October 2003; Label: Universal Music Australia (9811807)	ARIA: Gold^{°}

- ° Australian Music DVD Chart.

=== Compilation albums ===
Title	Details
Beginnings (Before Little River Band)	Released: 1978; Label: Capitol Records; Format: Vinyl
Beginnings Vol. 2 (Before Little River Band)	Released: 1980; Label: Capitol Records; Format: Vinyl

=== As featured On ===
- "Little River Band medley" Countdown Spectacular Live 2 (2007)
- "O Holy Night" on The Spirit of Christmas 2002 (2002)

=== See also ===
- Little River Band
- Mississippi (band)

== Awards ==
=== ARIA Hall of Fame ===
The ARIA Hall of Fame is to honour the growing number of legendary performers, producers, songwriters and others who have influenced music culture in Australia.

Year	Nominee / work	Award	Result
2004	(As members of) Little River Band	ARIA Hall of Fame	inducted

=== Australian Club Entertainment ===
Year	Nominee / work	Award	Result
2005	Birtles Shorrock Goble	Best Original Music Group	Won

=== Mo Awards ===
The Mo Awards, (technically The Australian Entertainment Mo Awards), are annual Australian entertainment industry awards. They recognise achievements in live entertainment in Australia.

Year	Nominee / work	Award	Result
2004	Birtles Shorrock Goble	Classical Rock Performers of the Year	Won

== Musicians ==
Since forming in 2002, Birtles Shorrock Goble have used a small nucleus of support musicians who have mastered the original LRB sound.

- Lead guitar
  - Simon Hosford 2002–2006
  - Brett Garsed 2007
- Bass guitar
  - Jason Vorherr 2002–2007
- Guitar
  - Joshua Goble 2003, 2007
  - Nathan Goble 2007
- Drums
  - John Watson 2002
  - Angus Burchall 2002, 2006–2007
  - Dave Beck 2002–2005
- Keyboard
  - Stewart Wilkinson 2002
  - Dorian West 2002–2005, 2007
  - Scott Griffiths 2006
- Percussion
  - James Richardson 2002
  - Alejandro Vega 2002–2007
