= Greg London =

American singer, entertainer & impressionist

- Born: December 26, 1966 (age 59); Northern California, U.S.
- Years active: 1972–present
- Known for: Impressions
- Website: gregorylondon.com

Greg London (born December 26, 1966) is an American singer, entertainer and impressionist. After a solo hit show in London's West End, he enjoyed a lengthy residency in Reno, Nevada before announcing his move to the Las Vegas Strip in mid-2010.

== Biography ==
=== Early life ===
London was born in Northern California to an English mother and an American father. When he was a young boy he moved with his mother to England where he went to school, but they continued to travel back and forth between England and California. As a child he played the trumpet with his grandfather in the Salvation Army's local brass band, and later played first chair trumpet in the California Youth Symphony. Greg is the godson of English trumpeter Ronnie Hunt, whose claims to fame include the Coronation Street signature tune, London taught himself to play several musical instruments, and regularly performs the trumpet, guitar, piano, harmonica and percussion instruments in his shows. A student of Dramatic Arts from 1976 to 1979 at Cabrillo College, College of Marin, Deanza College and workshops at UCSC, he trained in acting at San Francisco Dramatic Arts under James Dunn and Harvey Susser.

=== Life in performance ===
He performed in theatre and musical comedy in England and America, beginning as a child in Windsor near London, UK, and in his early twenties south of San Francisco he starred as Billy Crocker in Anything Goes with the Civic Light Opera, opposite stage legend Chita Rivera as Reno Sweeney. He auditioned for film and television, gaining several small roles during this same time. His first recording release, Alive Again in Santa Cruz (1979), sold a few thousand copies through East Records, Tokyo, Japan.

London formed a band in 1984, playing many hundreds of dates in clubs all over California, Nevada, Arizona and Colorado. He began developing his singing voice, and was discovered in Pebble Beach, California by Jack Welch of General Electric, which led to many opportunities to play at varied events in the corporate world.

By the early 1990s, he had become known on America's corporate entertainment circuit with his musical impressions-based comedic performance to showcase his talents.

London then recorded Song of America at A&M Studios. This was a CD of old and new American patriotic music, arranged by pianist and arranger Randy Waldman and mixed by engineer Jeffrey (Woody) Woodruff. After this he went on a two-year tour singing for the American troops; his performances received positive reviews, including

Inspirational, truly great, emotionally charged performance.

— Clint Eastwood

In winter 2007, he returned to England with his own show at The Venue in London's West End. The ICONS in London opened to rave reviews by both media and audiences alike.

Greg London has a rare gift for impersonating the pop world's biggest artists. The Icons in London showcases his uncanny vocal talent ... This human jukebox could perform an entire gig in any pop persona of his choosing ... It's the music that moves and uplifts. London is the polished conduit for it, and the evening is best appreciated for a winter warm up, thank you to America for giving us the soundtracks to our lives.

— Daily Telegraph

He appeared and sang in the 2008 movie The Dukes, directed by Robert Davi. From July 2007 to the end of 2009 he performed at the Sammy Davis Jr Showroom at Harrah's Entertainment in Reno, Nevada. In January 2008 he was named the "Show of the Year" by the entertainment editor of the Sacramento Bee. By the end of 2008 he had become one of Reno's longest-running solo entertainers ever. In July 2009 he won Best Entertainer of Nevada in the Nevada Magazine readers poll, and Best Show of Northern Nevada for his comedy rock stylized ICONS an episodic satire musical that utilizes mixing genres, both lampooning and parodies of iconic artists and original satire; created by London and written in the classic literary format, The Hero's Journey, with theater director David Taylor and London playwright Paul Miller. At the end of 2009 London garnered a "best impersonation" credit in The Huffington Post. In July 2011 he won Best Show of Nevada in the Nevada Magazine readers poll.

On May 27, 2010, the Las Vegas Review Journal announced a move to the Riviera. At the Red Carpet Media event September 2, 2010 Riviera President, Bob Vanucci, told the media the resort secured Greg London after searching for a performer who could fill the void left in the Las Vegas Strip entertainment landscape by the death of long time Strip performer, Danny Gans. Greg London was presented with three congratulatory letters from Nevada Governor Gibbons, Congresswoman Dina Titus and Senator Ensign, September 2, 2010, was declared by proclamation Greg London's ICONS Day by Las Vegas Mayor Oscar Goodman. He was then moved to the Las Vegas Hilton in early 2011.

=== Hit singles ===
Greg London's success as a pop music artist began during the 2008 holiday season, when his rendition of "Have Yourself a Merry Little Christmas" debuted as the #2 most added track on FMQB's AC40 chart and Radio & Records (Billboard) Adult Contemporary chart during the same week. It peaked at #40 on FMQB.

London followed up with a cover of the David Gates song "Everything I Own" (originally a hit for the soft rock group Bread in 1972). It stayed in the top 30 of the Mediabase and R&R airplay charts for eleven weeks, reaching #25 and #26 respectively; it also hit number 5 on the FMQB AC40 chart. London's next single released to radio, a cover of the Glenn Shorrock song "Cool Change" (originally a hit for the soft rock group Little River Band in 1979), hit the top 30 on the Media Base and R&R airplay charts on August 18, 2009, and went to #5 on FMQB AC40.

=== Awards ===
In 2001, London was presented with the Spotlight Award for "Entertainer of the Year" for his dynamic performances in the corporate world.

On November 19, 2009, London and "Everything I Own" won the award for Best Adult Contemporary Song for the highest charting new artist release and release on an independent label on all three AC Radio airplay charts at the Hollywood Music in Media Awards.

Music Connection magazine awarded London a position on their Hot 100 Unsigned Artists List 2009 in the Adult Contemporary category as reported in the December 2009 issue.

He was nominated for Best Adult Contemporary Song for "Don't Be So Hard on Yourself" at the 2011 Hollywood Music in Media Awards.

== Works ==
=== Singles discography ===
Year	Single	US chart		
Year	Single	FMQB AC	R&R	Mediabase
2008	"Have Yourself a Merry Little Christmas"	40	74	92
2009	"Everything I Own"	5	26	25
2009	"Cool Change"	5	31	29

=== Theatre credits and role ===
- Anything Goes -Billy Crocker
- Bye Bye Birdie -Conrad Birdie
- Carousel -Billy Bigelow
- Guys and Dolls -Nathan Detroit -Sky Masterson
- Marat/Sade -Marquis de Sade
- Merchant of Venice -Antonio
- My Fair Lady -Henry Higgins
- Music Man -Harold Hill
- No No Nanette -Billy Early
- Oklahoma -Curly
- Sugar-Joe
- Sweet Charity -Vitorio Vidal

=== Film ===
- The Dukes (2008)

=== Television ===
- Hollywood Music in Media Awards HMMA Awards Show Host
