= Tony Sciuto =

American musician

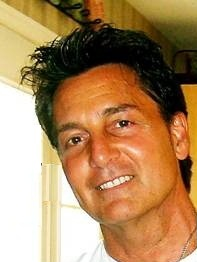

Background information
- Born: Antonino Joseph Sciuto Jr. December 30, 1952 (age 73); Baltimore, Maryland, U.S.
- Genres: Pop
- Occupation: Singer-songwriter
- Instruments: Vocals, guitar, keyboards
- Years active: 1965–present
- Labels: Epic Records, Cool Sound Records
- Formerly of: Little River Band, Player
- Website: www.tonysciuto.com

Antonino Joseph Sciuto Jr. (born December 30, 1952) is an American singer, songwriter, and record producer who has been active since 1965. He was a member of both Little River Band and Player. Sciuto has written songs for the Bay City Rollers, Nick Kamen, B. J. Thomas and Tina Turner amongst others. He has written soundtrack songs for several movies and scored a Top 10 hit in Japan.

== Early life ==
At the age of eight, Sciuto asked his mother for a guitar and was self-taught from listening to singles and reading music books. In 1964, he was taken to a Beatles concert that inspired him to take up music. As a teen, he also took formal guitar, piano, vocal and composition lessons. Sciuto studied Music Prep at the Peabody Institute.

== 1966-1981 ==
In 1966-The Beatles' New York affiliate manager Nat Weiss cited Sciuto to Brian Epstein as a "young protégé" to travel to New York for grooming. In 1975, Sciuto entered and won various contests with his songs in the American Song Festival.

In 1976, Sciuto had his song "My Lisa" recorded by the Bay City Rollers on their Dedication album on Arista Records. In 1979, he had two Top 40 hits in Japan and Australia with the song "Island Nights", recorded by Hideki Saijo in Japan and Marc Hunter in Australia.

In 1979, Sciuto was signed to Epic Records, with a 1980 release of his Island Nights album which reached the Top 10 in Japan along with the title track single. The album was written with lyricist Sammy Egorin. In 1981, Sciuto and his band toured Japan to rave reviews, opening the American Music Festival.

== 1986–1989 ==
Sciuto, and Sammy Egorin wrote "Last Sound Love Makes" for Don Johnson's album Heartbeat on Epic Records in 1986.

In 1988, Sciuto co-wrote Nick Kamen's "Bring Me Your Love" for the Us album on Sire Records, which was Top 20 in Italy and France. He co-wrote "Stronger than the Wind” for Tina Turner on Capitol Records in 1989.

In 1989 Sciuto co-wrote "One Last, One More Time" for B.J. Thomas on the Midnight Minute (Reprise Records) album. Also in 1989, Sciuto was a member of the John Stamos fictional band Jesse and the Rippers, and co-wrote a song for the episode "Comet's Excellent Adventure", for the Full House television series.

== 1990–2001 ==
In 1990, Sciuto co-wrote the title track for the Little River Band album Worldwide Love, with the song charting in Germany. He joined the Little River Band as a member and pianist from 1990 to 1997.

In 1991, Sciuto co-wrote and performed "Out Of The Darkness," the credit roll music for the film All-American Murder starring Christopher Walken. In 1992, he co-wrote "High Life" which was used in the Drew Barrymore film The Amy Fisher Story.

In 1996, Sciuto wrote, recorded and released the album Holiday in Eden under the band name Banging Rush. In 2001 Sciuto wrote a song with Sammy Egorin, "Legend in the Sun", that commemorated the career of Baltimore Orioles shortstop Cal Ripken Jr. He also performed the song on the Orioles dugout to a sellout crowd prior to the game.

Sciuto performed as keyboardist with Player from 1998 to 2001.

== 2002–present ==
Sciuto released Be My Radio, Live in Japan and Diamond In The Rough CDs on the Cool Sound label in Japan. Union of the Soul was released in 2010.

In 2012, the Tony Sciuto Band performed in Japan for the second time in 32 years, performing the entire Island Nights album for seven shows at the Cotton Club Tokyo. In 2014, Vivid Sound Records is releasing Under The Radar (Limited Edition) with the live Cotton Club Show as the second, bonus CD.

In 2013, after meeting Freda Kelly (the original secretary of the Beatles' fan club) in New York, Tony was inspired to write a song "Good Ol Freda," which was also the name of her documentary about her years with the Beatles. He also created a 'slideshow' video accompanying his song that was presented in a Catonsville, Maryland, theater following the documentary's screening with Freda present.

In 2016, P-Vine Records in Japan released Tony Sciuto's "Temptation Alley" CD, a gathering of 9 new songs plus a few songs from the 90's and 2 songs from the 80's. In 2017, P-Vine's Light and Mellow label released a compilation CD "Take a Trip" and included "The Quick and The Dead" from Tony's "Temptation Alley " CD In 2020, Tony Sciuto Released his "Rear View Mirror" Album https://tonysciuto.bandcamp.com/album/rear-view-mirror

Tony now resides in Delaware and occasionally plays shows with former Bad Company Bassist Paul Cullen

== Discography ==
Island Nights (re-release with further bonus tracks)

- Released: 2011
- Format: CD
- Tracks: "Island Nights Theme", "Island Nights", "Hold Back the Night", "You've Got a License (To Drive Me Crazy)", "Cafe L.A.", "Trapeze", "Angel", "Captain Wonderful", "Street Dancer", "Butterfly"
- Bonus tracks: "Where Would We Be (Without Love)", "One More Time Till Tomorrow", "Going Through the Emotions", "Temptation Alley", "Captain Wonderful" (1977 demo), "Ragtime"

Union of the Soul

- Released: April 22, 2010
- Format: CD
- Tracks: “Water to a Flame“, “If Hell Had Windows“, “Under a New Sky“, “Same Girl“, “All Over Again“, “Last Weekend“, “Quotation and Question Mark“, “Break the Fall“, “Mickey Mantle“, “Sabrina“

Live in Japan

- Released: January 5, 2005
- Format: CD
- Label: Cool Sound Records
- Tracks: "Island Nights Theme" / "Black And Blue Heart", "Street Dancer", "Captain Wonderful", "Trapeze", "Butterfly", "Hold Back To The Night", "On The Cold Street", "Cafe L.A.", "Island Nights", "You've Got A License (To Drive Me Crazy)"

Diamond in the Rough

- Released: January 5, 2005
- Format: CD
- Label: Cool Sound Records
- Tracks: "Diamond in the Rough", "Love Heat the Night", "We Belong Together", "Answer to my Prayer", "Water to a Flame", "Three Sides to Every Story", "I'll Build my World Around You", "The Last Sound Love Makes", "One Heartbeat at a Time", "All Over You", "Just a Photograph", "In My Life", "There's Such a Thing as too Long"

Island Nights (re-release with bonus tracks)

- Released: 1999
- Format: CD
- Writer: Sammy Egorin, Tony Sciuto, Steve Warehime
- Tracks: "Island Nights Theme", "Island Nights", "Hold Back the Night", "You've Got a License (To Drive Me Crazy)", "Cafe L.A.", "Trapeze", "Angel", "Captain Wonderful", "Street Dancer", "Butterfly"
- Bonus tracks: "Hold Back the Night" (live in Japan), "Cafe L.A." (live in Japan), "On the Cold Street", "Black and Blue Heart"

Be My Radio

- Released: 1999
- Format: CD
- Label: Cool Sound Records
- Tracks: "Secrets In The Night", "Feel My Love", "Be My Radio", "Gimme A Sign", "Showdown", "Let's Start All Over Again", "M'Lisa", "Take A Chance", "Next To Love"
- Bonus tracks: "Island Nights" (alternate mix), "Trapeze" (alternate mix), "Angel" (alternate mix)

Holiday in Eden (Banging Rush album)

- Released: December 7, 1997
- Format: CD
- Label: Psycho-Active Records
- Tracks: "Welcome to the Show", "Last Weekend", "Under a New Sky", "If Hell Had Windows", "Black Rain", "Mickey Mantle", "Break the Fall", "All Over Again", "Sabrina", "Who?", "Can't Stop the River", "Light My Fire"

Genius (bONEhEAD album)

- Released: 1995
- Format: CD
- Producer: Tony Sciuto and Arnold Geher
- Tracks: "Last Weekend", "Under a New Sky", "Mickey Mantle", "Black Rain, "Light My Fire", "Pigeon & Frog Dance", "Tattoo Blue", "Sabrina", "Who?", "Hiding in the Clouds"

"Worldwide Love" (Little River Band single) from the album Worldwide Love

- Released: May 28, 1991
- Format: 45 rpm single
- Label: Curb Records
- Writer: Tony Sciuto, Peter Beckett, Derek Pellicci
- Producer: David J. Holman, John Capek, Peter Beckett
- Tracks: "Worldwide Love", "The Bottom Line"

Island Nights

- Released: 1980
- Format: LP
- Label: Epic
- Writer: Sammy Egorin, Tony Sciuto, Steve Warehime
- Tracks: "Island Nights Theme", "Island Nights", "Hold Back the Night", "You've Got a License (To Drive Me Crazy)", "Cafe L.A.", "Trapeze", "Angel", "Captain Wonderful", "Street Dancer", "Butterfly"
