= Too Late to Load =

Compilation album by Little River Band
- Released: April 1989
- Recorded: 1975–1986
- Genre: Rock
- Length: 45:53
- Label: EMI
- Producers: Ern Rose, Little River Band, Graham Goble, Richard Dodd

Little River Band chronology
Monsoon (1988)	Too Late to Load (1989)	Get Lucky (1990)

Singles from Too Late to Load
- 1. "When Will I Be Loved" Released: June 1989

Too Late to Load (subtitled (The Unissued, Unavailable And Ultra Rare LRB Masters, 1975 - 1986)) is an Australian-only rarities compilation album by Australian band Little River Band, released in 1988.

== Background ==
While reviewing tracks for a Little River Band greatest hits collection, Glenn A. Baker and Graham Goble discovered many tracks which had been overlooked for earlier studio albums.

== Track listing ==
1. "When Will I Be Loved" (1975) (P. Everly) - 2:50
2. "D" (1983) (B. Birtles/G. Goble) - 3:03
3. "Gunslinger" (1976) (G. Shorrock) - 4:47
4. "Please Don't Ask Me" (1982) (G. Goble) - 3:17
5. "The Shut Out" (1985) (G. Goble) - 2:50
6. "One Day" (1986) (G. Goble) - 2:39
7. "Love Letters" - live (1983) (V. Young/E. Heyman) - 3:07
8. "Stormy Surrender" (1985) (G. Goble) - 4:53
9. "What Ya Thinka Me" (1978) (G. Goble/B. Birtles) - 3:37
10. "Tender Betrayal" (1986) (G. Goble) - 4:41
11. "The Butterfly" - instrumental (1985) (trad., arr. Little River Band) - 2:33
12. "Chip Off the Old Block" (1975) (G. Shorrock) - 2:54
13. "Good Wine"
