= Love Is a Bridge =

1988 single by Little River Band

Single by Little River Band

from the album Monsoon
- B-side: "Inside Story"
- Released: April 1988
- Length: 4:03
- Label: MCA
- Songwriters: Graham Goble, Stephen Housden
- Producer: John Boylan

Little River Band singles chronology
"When the War Is Over" (1986)	"Love Is a Bridge" (1988)	"Son of a Famous Man" (1988)

"Love Is a Bridge" is a song by Australian band Little River Band, released in April 1988 as the lead single from the group's tenth studio album, Monsoon. The song peaked at number 6 on the Australian Music Report singles chart. The music video features Australian actor Marcus Graham.

== Track listing ==
Australian 7" (MCA Records 7-53291), U.S. 7" (MCA Records MCA-53291)

Side A. "Love Is a Bridge" – 4:03
Side B. "Inside Story" – 4:22

== Charts ==
Chart performance for "Love Is a Bridge"
Chart (1988)	Peak position
Australia (Australian Music Report)	6
