= Get Lucky (Little River Band album) =

Studio album by Little River Band
- Released: April 1990
- Recorded: 1988−1989
- Genre: Rock
- Length: 43:47
- Label: MCA
- Producer: Dennis Lambert

Little River Band chronology
Too Late to Load (1989)	Get Lucky (1990)	Worldwide Love (1991)

Singles from Get Lucky
- 1. "If I Get Lucky" Released: March 1990; 2. "Every Time I Turn Around" Released: June 1990

Get Lucky is the eleventh studio album by Australian group, Little River Band, released in April 1990, the album peaked at number 54 on the Australian ARIA Charts.

== Track listing ==
1. "If I Get Lucky" (Mike Chapman) – 4:12
2. "There's Not Another You" (Graham Goble) – 3:49
3. "Second Wind" (Dennis Lambert, Pam Reswick, Steve Werfel) – 4:14
4. "Every Time I Turn Around" (Peter Beckett, Lambert) – 4:35
5. "I Dream Alone" (Derek Pellicci, Glenn Shorrock) – 4:50
6. "Time and Eternity" (Goble) – 4:08
7. "Two Emotions" (Goble) – 4:28
8. "As Long as I'm Alive" (Goble, Matthew Nelson, Gunnar Nelson) – 4:35
9. "The One That Got Away" (Lambert, Wayne Nelson, Claude Gaudette) – 3:56
10. "Listen to Your Heart" (Tom Kelly, Billy Steinberg) – 4:51

== Personnel ==
- Glenn Shorrock – lead vocals (tracks 1–6, 10)
- Graham Goble – rhythm guitar, backing vocals
- Derek Pellicci – drums
- Stephen Housden – lead guitar
- Wayne Nelson – bass, backing vocals; lead vocals (tracks 7–9)

Additional personnel

- Claude Gaudette – keyboards, programming
- Dennis Lambert – keyboards, programming
- Jamie Paddle – keyboards, programming
- John Robinson – additional drums

== Charts ==
Chart performance for Get Lucky
Chart (1990)	Peak position
Australian Albums (ARIA)	54
