= Steve Wade (singer) =

- Born: Stephen Wade; Liverpool, England
- Genre: Pop
- Occupation: Musician
- Instruments: Vocals, guitar
- Label: Swade
- Formerly of: Dolphin Street; Tempted; Little River Band
- Website: stevewade.com

Stephen Wade is an English-born Australian-based singer, songwriter and musician. He won the Australian Songwriter of the Year in 1989 and 1990. Wade was a member of the Graham Goble Encounter (1993–95), which recorded two albums and toured Germany. During 1994 he provided guitar and vocals for another group, Tempted, on their self-titled album. From 1996, for four years, Wade was a lead vocalist for the soft rock group, Little River Band. In 2001 he issued his debut self-titled album and during 2006 he was a member of the trio Pealing Wade & Young, with Mick Pealing (ex-Stars) and Gary Young (from Scarecrow), which issued an eponymous album. In April 2013 he auditioned for series two of The Voice, but was not selected.

== Biography ==
Steve Wade was born in Liverpool, England in the early 1960s and moved to Australia at a young age. He developed an interest in music and began performing at venues around Melbourne. He impressed jingle writer Mike Brady who employed him as a session singer. Wade was a member of various groups including Dolphin Street and Big Push.

In 1993 Wade was recruited by ex-Little River Band singer-guitarist, Graham Goble to front his new band, the Graham Goble Encounter. Wade sang lead vocals on their first album, Nautilus (1993), which was produced by Goble. The band toured Germany to promote that album. One of its tracks, "I've Been Broken", was co-written by Wade and Goble. Wade also sang on their second album, Stop (1996). In between the two albums, Wade on lead vocals and guitar formed a short-lived trio, Tempted, in 1994, alongside George Servanis on drums, percussion and backing vocals, and Anthony Tosti-Guerra on keyboarding, programming and backing vocals. They issued a self-titled album in that year produced by the band members and then they disbanded.

Wade joined Little River Band as lead singer in 1996, replacing Glenn Shorrock. During the next four years he appeared in more than 500 performances with the band. He was replaced, in turn, by Greg Hind in early 2000. Wade has been a member of ten different bands during his career. He has won three awards from the Australian Songwriters Association: Songwriter of the Year in 1989 and 1990 and Best Folk/World Song for "Lonely Balladeer" in 2001.

He has written, recorded or arranged jingles and theme songs for radio and television. He arranged the 2002 version of the theme for TV soap opera, Neighbours, which was sung by Janine Maunder. He was a member of Pealing Wade & Young alongside Mick Pealing (ex-Stars) on vocals and guitar, and Gary Young (from Scarecrow) on vocals, guitar and harmonica. They issued a self-titled album in that year which was recorded, mixed and mastered by Tosti-Guerra.

In 2008 Wade provided guitar and vocals as a member of the in-house band for the History of Rock display at the Arts Centre aimed at school students from years 4 to 12. During 2009 he performed at the Crown Casino.

In April 2013 Wade auditioned for a place on TV talent quest, The Voice. He sang Don Henley's "The Boys of Summer" although his powerful voice was not evident and he was not selected by any of the four judges. Elle Halliwell of The Daily Telegraph felt "[it was] downright embarrassing to watch Wade, whose songwriting talent has earned him two Australian Songwriters Association Songwriter of the Year awards, being given tips from Goodrem on how to improve his performances... There should be a point at which a contestant is too successful to audition for The Voice. To me, that point is when they have more experience than the show's coaches."

== Discography ==
Solo

- Steve Wade (2001)

The Graham Goble Encounter

- Nautilus (1993)
  - The New Nautilus (1999)
- Stop (1996)

Tempted

- Tempted (1994)

Pealing Wade & Young

- Pealing Wade & Young (2006)

== Videography ==
- "Can't Eat, Can't Sleep", The Graham Goble Encounter, German television appearance, 1993
- "Help Is On Its Way", Little River Band, live performance, 1996
- "Lady", Little River Band, Today (NBC), Rockefeller Plaza, 1997
- "Cool Change", Little River Band, Today (NBC), Rockefeller Plaza, 1997
