= First Under the Wire =

Studio album by Little River Band
- Released: July 9, 1979
- Genres: Rock; pop rock; hard rock; soft rock
- Length: 46:09
- Label: Capitol
- Producers: John Boylan & Little River Band

Little River Band chronology
It's a Long Way There (Greatest Hits) (1978)	First Under the Wire (1979)	Backstage Pass (1979)

Singles from First Under the Wire
- 1. "Lonesome Loser" Released: July 1979; 2. "Cool Change" Released: August 1979 (North America only); 3. "It's Not a Wonder" Released: October 1979

First Under the Wire is the fifth studio album by Australian group Little River Band, released in July 1979 by Capitol Records. The album peaked at No. 2 on the Australian Kent Music Report Albums Chart and at No. 10 on the Billboard 200, becoming the group's highest-charting album in that territory. The album included two top 10 Billboard Hot 100 hits in "Lonesome Loser" and "Cool Change".

== Reception ==
Cash Box magazine said "Ringing harmonies are the Little River Band's forte, and its resonant vocal arrangements are in full bloom on First Under the Wire. John Boylan's sterling production adds lustre to the songs, and David Briggs brilliant guitar work continues to be the group's musical focal point." calling the album "A must for AOR, MOR and pop programmers."

Mark Allan from Allmusic gave the album four stars.

Professional ratings
Review scores
Source	Rating
Allmusic	link

== Track listing ==
Side A

1. "Lonesome Loser" (David Briggs) - 3:58
2. "The Rumour" (Glenn Shorrock) - 4:18
3. "By My Side" (Beeb Birtles, Graham Goble) - 4:25
4. "Cool Change" (Glenn Shorrock) - 5:14
5. "It's Not a Wonder" (Graham Goble) - 3:56

Side B

6. "Hard Life" (Prelude) (David Briggs) - 2:42
7. "Hard Life" (Graham Goble) - 4:46
8. "Middle Man" (Beeb Birtles, Graham Goble) - 4:24
9. "Man on the Run" (Beeb Birtles, Graham Goble) - 4:16
10. "Mistress of Mine" (Graham Goble) - 5:32

== Personnel ==
- Glenn Shorrock - lead vocals (except as noted)
- David Briggs - lead guitars, Roland synthesizer guitars, Electric Sitar on track 10
- Beeb Birtles - electric and acoustic guitars, vocals, lead vocals on tracks 3 and 9, co-lead vocals on track 8
- Graham Goble - electric and acoustic guitars, backing vocals, vocal arrangements
- Derek Pellicci - Sonor and Syndrums drums, percussion
- Clive Harrison - bass guitar (tracks 1, 2, 5, 9 and 10)
- Mike Clarke - bass (tracks 3, 4, 6, 7, 8 and 10)
- Peter Sullivan - piano (tracks 1, 2, 5, 9)
- Peter Jones - piano and keyboards (tracks 3, 4, 6, 7, 8 and 10) and orchestrations
- Bill Harrower - saxophones on tracks 4 and 8
- John Boylan - acoustic guitar on track 2

== Charts ==
=== Weekly charts ===
Chart (1979)	Peak position
Australia (Kent Music Report)	2
Canada Top Albums/CDs (RPM)	7
New Zealand Albums (RMNZ)	19
US Billboard 200	10

=== Year-end charts ===
Chart (1979)	Position
Canada Top Albums/CDs (RPM)	30
Chart (1980)	Position
US Billboard 200	98

== Certifications ==
Region	Certification	Certified units/sales
United States (RIAA)	Platinum	1,000,000^{^}
^{^} Shipments figures based on certification alone.
