= Monsoon (Little River Band album) =

Studio album by Little River Band
- Released: May 1988
- Recorded: 1987
- Studios: Metropolis Audio (Melbourne); Capitol (Hollywood); Sunset Sound (Los Angeles)
- Genre: Rock
- Length: 43:17
- Label: MCA
- Producer: John Boylan

Little River Band chronology
| No Reins (1986) | Monsoon (1988) | Too Late to Load (1989) |

Singles from Monsoon
- 1. "Love Is a Bridge" Released: April 1988; 2. "Son of a Famous Man" Released: August 1988; 3. "Soul Searching" Released: September 1988

Monsoon is the tenth studio album by Australian group, Little River Band, with Glenn Shorrock returning as lead singer after John Farnham left the group to release his solo album Whispering Jack. The album was released in May 1988 and peaked at number nine on the Kent Music Report albums chart.

== Background ==
Little River Band (LRB) issued Monsoon as their tenth studio album with the line-up of Graeham Goble on guitars and vocals, Stephen Housden on lead guitar, Wayne Nelson on bass guitar and vocals, Derek Pellicci on drums and Glenn Shorrock on lead vocals and keyboards. The Australian band had formed in Melbourne as a harmony rock group by Goble, Pellicci and Shorrock, they toured extensively in the United States and were later joined by Nelson and Housden. Shorrock left LRB in 1982 and Pellicci left in 1984. Shorrock's replacement on lead vocals John Farnham left in 1986 to return to his solo career and LRB remained in hiatus. Pellicci and Shorrock returned in July 1987 at the request of Irving Azoff, the head of MCA Records, who wanted the group on his label. According to Lisa Wallace, Pellicci and Shorrock's rejoining was due to "the fact that they still make good music together, and the money".

Monsoon peaked at number nine on the Australian Kent Music Report albums chart. It provided three Australian singles "Love Is a Bridge" (April 1988), "Son of a Famous Man" (August) and "Soul Searching" (September). Meanwhile "It's Cold Out Tonight" was issued in North America instead of "Soul Searching". Only "Love Is a Bridge" charted – it reached number six in Australia and number 18 on the US Billboard Adult Contemporary chart.

== Reception ==
Professional ratings
Review scores
| Source | Rating |
|---|---|
| AllMusic | 2/5 stars |
| Encyclopedia of Popular Music | 3/5 stars |

The Canberra Times' Lisa Wallace was disappointed by Monsoon's lack of innovation despite the group showing technical skills.

== Track listing ==
Monsoon track listing
| No. | Title | Writer(s) | Length |
|---|---|---|---|
| 1. | "It's Cold Out Tonight" | Graham Goble | 4:38 |
| 2. | "Parallel Lines" | Glenn Shorrock, J.C. Crowley | 3:23 |
| 3. | "Love Is a Bridge" | Goble, Stephen Housden | 4:04 |
| 4. | "The Rhythm King" | Derek Pellicci, John Capek | 4:25 |
| 5. | "Face in the Crowd" ( (Note: Original version released on No Reins.)) | Goble | 4:45 |
| 6. | "A Cruel Madness" | Goble | 4:50 |
| 7. | "Inside Story" | David Scheibner, Steven Marc Cristol, Goble, Wayne Nelson, Pellicci, Housden | 4:40 |
| 8. | "Son of a Famous Man" | Goble, Nelson, Pellicci, Housden | 4:49 |
| 9. | "Soul Searching" | Peter Beckett, Shorrock | 4:22 |
| 10. | "Great Unknown" | John Boylan | 4:56 |
| 11. | "Shadow in the Rain" | Goble | 3:56 |
| Total length: | | | 43:17 |

== Personnel ==
Little River Band

- Glenn Shorrock – vocals, keyboards
- Graham Goble – guitar, vocals
- Stephen Housden – lead guitar
- Wayne Nelson – bass, lead vocals on "Inside Story"
- Derek Pellicci – drums

Additional musicians

- Chong Lim – synthesiser
- Jai Winding – piano
- John Capek – keyboards
- Paulinho da Costa – percussion

Technical work

- John Boylan – producer
- Ian McKenzie – engineer
- Michael Wickow, Paul Grupp – additional engineers
- Barry Conley, Jim Champagne, Leanne Vallence, Leslie Ann Jones, Paul Wertheimer – assistant engineers
- Wally Traugott – mastering

== Charts ==
Chart performance for Monsoon
| Chart (1988) | Peak position |
|---|---|
| Australian Albums (Australian Music Report) | 9 |
| Canada Top Albums/CDs (RPM) | 49 |
