= Worldwide Love =

Compilation album by Little River Band
- Released: June 1991
- Label: Curb Records

Little River Band chronology
Get Lucky (1990)	Worldwide Love (1991)	Live Classics (1992)

Worldwide Love is a 1991 compilation album by the Australian group Little River Band. It compiles songs from the band's previous two albums, Monsoon and Get Lucky, with the exception of the title track, "Worldwide Love", written by band members Tony Sciuto, Derek Pellicci and Peter Beckett which had not been previously released. The album was not released in Australia.

== Track listing ==
1. "Worldwide Love"
2. "It's Cold Out Tonight"
3. "There's Not Another You"
4. "Soul Searching"
5. "Parallel Lines"
6. "Son of a Famous Man"
7. "The Rhythm King"
8. "If I Get Lucky"
9. "I Dream Alone"
10. "The One That Got Away"

== Charts ==
Chart (1991)	Peak position
Austrian Albums (Ö3 Austria)	34
Swiss Albums (Schweizer Hitparade)	40
