= Mississippi (band) =

1970s Australian soft rock band

- Also known as: Allison Gros, Drummond
- Origin: Adelaide, South Australia, Australia
- Genres: Soft rock, folk rock, pop
- Years active: 1970–1975
- Labels: Gamba, Fable, Bootleg
- Spinoffs: Little River Band
- Past members: Graham Goble; Russ Johnson; Rob Leedham; John Mower; Shane Simon; Kerryn Tolhurst; Harvey James; Beeb Birtles; Colin DeLuca; Ted van Zyl; Peter Martin; Derek Pellicci; Andre Santos; Charlie Tumahai

Mississippi were an Australian soft rock band (1972–1975), which included Graham Goble on lead vocals and guitar, Beeb Birtles on lead vocals and guitar, and Derek Pellicci on drums. The band had started as Allison Gros in Adelaide in 1970 and moved to Melbourne in 1971 where they recorded as Allison Gros, Drummond and, early in 1972, became Mississippi. As Drummond they issued a cover version of "Daddy Cool" (July 1971), which peaked at No. 1 on the Go-Set National Top 40 for eight weeks. As Mississippi they reached No. 10 with "Kings of the World" (October 1972). In early 1975, with Birtles, Goble and Pellicci aboard and the addition of Glenn Shorrock, the group were renamed Little River Band.

== History ==
=== 1970–1972: Allison Gros and Drummond ===
Mississippi developed from an Adelaide-based soft rock group, Allison Gros which formed in 1970 with Graham Goble on vocals and guitar, Russ Johnson on vocals and guitar, Rob Leedham on bass guitar, John Mower on lead vocals and Shane Simon on drums. The group were probably named after "Allison Gross", which is a traditional English folk ballad, with a widely recognised version recorded by Steeleye Span for their 1973 album, Parcel of Rogues.

Allison Gros recorded a lone single, "Naturally", on the independent label, Gamba, which was released in 1970. It appeared on the Kent Music Report Singles Chart top 100. The band moved to Melbourne in 1971 and signed to Ron Tudor's Fable Records label and released two further singles: "If I Ask You" (July 1971) and "All the Days" (December 1971).

In 1971, Allison Gros (as Drummond) recorded a "Chipmunk"-style cover version of a 1950s rock song, "Daddy Cool" (July 1971), which spent eight weeks at the top of the Go-Set National Top 40, from 18 September to 12 November. Its success had immediately followed "Eagle Rock" by local band, Daddy Cool, which had held the number-one spot for 10 weeks. Drummond recorded further singles, but with no further involvement from members of Allison Gros. Fable (which owned the band name) used the name "Drummond" for different ensembles of studio musicians until September 1977.

=== 1972–1975: Mississippi ===
Early in 1972, Allison Gros were renamed as Mississippi with Goble, Johnson and Mower joined by session musicians: Geoff Cox on drums, Peter Jones on piano, Graeme Lyall on flute and Barry Sullivan on bass guitar. They released a self-titled debut LP in that year which reached No. 21 on the Kent Music Report Albums Chart. Mississippi was produced by Jones and Ern Rose via the Bootleg label, which had been set up by Tudor and Brian Cadd. According to Australian musicologist, Ian McFarlane, it "featured a harmony-rich rock sound heavily influenced by Crosby Stills Nash and Young and The Band. One of the highlights was the lush, orchestrated epic 'Save the Land'." In October, it provided the single "Kings of the World" – "another of the album's standouts" – which reached No. 10 on the Go-Set National Top 40.

In late 1972, Mississippi were joined by Beeb Birtles (ex-Zoot, Frieze) on guitar and vocals, Colin DeLuca (ex-Fugitives) on bass guitar and Derek Pellicci (ex-Ash) on drums. This line-up released a single, "Mr Moondog", in December and toured Australia. They appeared at the Sunbury Pop Festival in January 1973. During 1973 there were several changes in the line-up, with Johnson replaced, in February, by Kerryn Tolhurst (ex-Country Radio) on guitar and mandolin; he was replaced in turn by Harvey James (ex-Clydehouse, Sayla, Wendy Saddington Band) on guitar, a month later. Another single, "Early Morning", was released in July, which peaked at No. 56 on the Kent Music Report. They supported the Jackson Five on the Australian leg of their tour in October of that year. In that same month DeLuca and Mower left and were replaced by Andre Santos on bass guitar and vocals. Santos was replaced two months later by Charlie Tumahai.

In 1974, they appeared at the Sunbury Pop Festival again. Their next single, "Will I?", appeared in May which peaked at No. 31 on the Go-Set National Top 40. They toured the United Kingdom in 1974 and broke up. In London Birtles, Goble and Pellici met with former Masters Apprentices bass guitarist, Glenn Wheatley, who agreed to become their manager should they decide to go back to Australia. Wheatley was eager to return to Australia after working in the United States and the UK. In the UK, the group met Glenn Shorrock (ex-the Twilights, Axiom) who had been there for four years, and was also returning home.

In early 1975, the individuals members, Birtles, Goble, Pellici and Shorrock, had returned to Australia and reformed Mississippi, with the addition of Graham Davidge on lead guitar and Dave Orams on bass guitar. After a few concerts, on the way to a gig in Geelong, in March, they decided to change their name to Little River Band, after passing by the town of Little River. Under the guidance of Wheatley, they became one of Australia's most successful bands in the US.

== Discography ==
=== Studio albums ===
List of albums, with Australian chart positions
Title	Album details	Peak chart positions
Title	Album details	AUS
Mississippi	Released: 1972; Format: LP; Label: Bootleg (BLA 022)	21

=== Singles ===
Year	Single	Chart Positions
Year	Single	AUS
1972	"Kings of the World"	7
1972	"Mr. Moondog"	-
1973	"Early Morning"	56
1974	"Will I"	26
1975	"When You're Old"	-
