= Cool Change (song) =

- 7" vinyl single

Single by Little River Band

from the album First Under the Wire
- B-side: "Middle Man"
- Released: August 1979
- Recorded: 1979
- Genre: Soft rock
- Length: 5:14 (album version); 3:56 (single version)
- Label: Capitol
- Songwriter: Glenn Shorrock
- Producers: John Boylan, Little River Band

Little River Band singles chronology
"Lonesome Loser" (1979)	"Cool Change" (1979)	"It's Not a Wonder" (1979)

"Cool Change" is a song by Australian rock group Little River Band written by lead singer Glenn Shorrock. It was released in August 1979 as the second single from their fifth album, First Under the Wire.

The term "cool change" refers to a dry summertime southern Australian cold front. The song peaked at number 10 on the Billboard Hot 100 in the week of 19 January 1980.

The song was not released as a single in Australia. However, in May 2001, "Cool Change" was selected by the Australasian Performing Right Association (APRA) as one of the Top 30 Australian songs of all time. The song was also awarded a special citation of achievement by BMI for over two million radio broadcasts in the United States.

In January 2018, as part of Triple M's "Ozzest 100", the 'most Australian' songs of all time, "Cool Change" was ranked number 89.

== Track listings ==
New Zealand 7" (Capitol Records – F4789)
A. "Cool Change" - 3:56
B. "Middle Man" - 4:24

North American 7" (Capitol 4789)
A. "Cool Change" - 3:56
B. "Middle Man" - 4:24

== Personnel ==
Little River Band members

- Beeb Birtles – guitar, backing vocals (track 1), lead vocals (track 2)
- Derek Pellicci – drums, percussion
- Glenn Shorrock – lead vocals (track 1), backing vocals (track 2)
- Graeham Goble – guitar, backing vocals

Additional musicians

- Mike Clarke – bass guitar
- Bill Harrower – saxophone
- Peter Jones – piano (track 1), keyboards (track 2)

Production details

- Producer – John Boylan, Little River Band

== Charts ==
=== Weekly charts ===
Chart (1979/80)	Peak position
Canada Top Singles (RPM)	7
New Zealand (Recorded Music NZ)	25
U.S. (Billboard Hot 100)	10
U.S. (Easy Listening)	8

=== Year-end charts ===
Chart (1980)	Position
Canada Top Singles (RPM)	80
US (US Top Pop Singles)	56

== Cover versions ==
- Greg London released a cover to radio on 16 June 2009 that entered the top 30 on the Media Base and R&R airplay charts on 18 August 2009, while reaching number 5 on the FMQB AC40 chart.
- Cool Change is the name of a Little River Band tribute band based in Melbourne.
