= Derek Pellicci =

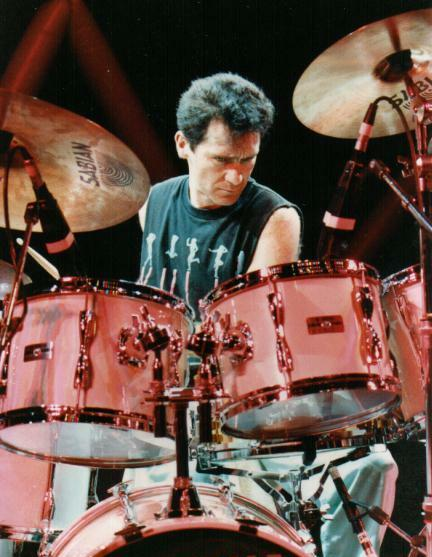

Background information
- Born: Derek Allan Pellicci; 18 February 1953 (age 73); London, England
- Genres: Soft rock, pop
- Instruments: Drums, percussion
- Years active: 1968–1997, 2026-Present
- Labels: Bootleg, EMI, Capitol, MCA,
- Formerly of: Little River Band, Mississippi

Derek Allan Pellicci (born 18 February 1953) is an English-born Australian drummer and songwriter. He was a founding member of Little River Band with whom he performed and recorded from 1975 to 1984 and again from 1988 to 1997. Pellicci played on the band's major international releases during its most commercially successful period, including all 13 U.S. Top 40 singles, and was a member of the lineup inducted into the ARIA Hall of Fame in 2004. Pellicci lives in Melbourne with his wife, Anne and a son.

== Early life ==
In 1960, Pellicci's family, his father Arthur, mother Jessie and older brother John, emigrated to Melbourne, Victoria, Australia as "Ten Pound Poms".

In 1964, his older brother John took the 11-year-old Pellicci to see The Beatles greet fans from the balcony of Melbourne's Southern Cross Hotel. Pellicci stated that the experience influenced his career path. Shortly after, John bought him a Trixon drum kit that had been traded in at a local car dealer. Pellicci subsequently prioritized drum practice over school attendance.

After the family moved to King Island, Tasmania in 1966, Pellicci attended the local high school while John and Arthur took jobs at the King Island Scheelite mine. This rural culture shock was magnified by the fact that Pellicci was passionate about music but had to wait up to a month for the latest pop 45s to be freighted over from mainland Victoria.

== Early career ==
In 1968 Pellicci returned to Melbourne to pursue his music career in earnest, first with the semi-pro band Recital, then his first professional group Plum.

The break-up of Plum led to stints with various groups: Ash (initially under the name Derek Allen), Arthur & The Argonauts, Island, Blackfeather and New Zealand Highway.

== Mississippi ==
In 1972 Pellicci joined a new band, Mississippi (featuring future Little River Band members, Graeham Goble and Beeb Birtles). Mississippi not only served to develop his studio skills, but also was an orientation into the gruelling road tours that lay ahead. This led to more studio experience, both in recordings with Mississippi and session work in radio jingles and recordings with other artists.

In 1974 Mississippi sailed for England (coincidentally on the same ship that had brought Pellicci to Australia, the Fairsky).

Whilst in the UK, Pellicci was stunned to learn he had been adopted as a baby. In 2003, he learnt that his birth mother, Gladys Sylvia Hadley had died in Jerusalem on 29 May 1990. Pellicci never met either of his biological parents.

== Little River Band ==
In 1975 Mississippi returned to Australia and commenced rehearsals with new lead singer Glenn Shorrock, subsequently changing their name to Little River Band. The band released their self-titled debut album later that year, followed by After Hours in 1976. Pellicci toured extensively with the band as it established itself in Australia and began achieving international recognition. In 1977, Little River Band released Diamantina Cocktail, which included the singles "Help Is on Its Way" and "Happy Anniversary".

In 1978, two significant events occurred in Pellicci's life. In May, he suffered a serious burns accident which hospitalised him for two months. In December of that year, he married his longtime girlfriend, Anne Deacon.

The band continued to build its international profile, releasing Sleeper Catcher in 1978 and First Under the Wire in 1979. Sleeper Catcher produced the singles "Reminiscing" and "Lady". First Under the Wire followed with "Lonesome Loser" and "Cool Change". Pellicci remained the band's drummer during this period and toured extensively in support of the albums.

Pellicci also performed as a session musician, contributing drums to Birtles & Goble's The Last Romance (1980), Darryl Cotton's 1980 solo album Best Seat in the House and John Farnham's adult contemporary album Uncovered with guitarists Tommy Emmanuel, David Briggs, Barry Sullivan, Mal Logan and Peter Jones in 1980.

In April 1981, Pellicci and the other members of Little River Band flew out to the Caribbean island of Montserrat to record the album Time Exposure with legendary Beatles producer George Martin.

After Glenn Shorrock’s departure in 1982, John Farnham became lead vocalist, with Pellicci remaining through the recording of The Net (album) (1983). After the departure of Beeb Birtles from Little River Band, in 1984, Pellicci also quit the band amid stylistic differences within the band and he and his wife Anne moved to Los Angeles to focus on his songwriting. Cold Chisel's Stephen Prestwich replaced Pellicci.

Pellicci and Anne moved back to Australia for the birth of their son Joel in 1985. Over the next few years Pellicci worked on projects with well-known artists including Goanna, Colin Hay, Daryl Braithwaite, Stevie Wright, Shirley Strachan, Ross Wilson, Marc Hunter, Stephen Cummings, Joe Camilleri, Renee Geyer, and Eddie Rayner, amongst others. He also composed lyrics for Japanese pop star, Yōsui Inoue's 'English language' album.

In 1988 Pellicci reunited with Little River Band (Birtles, David Briggs and George McArdle did not participate) for a triumphant show at the opening of the Brisbane World Expo 88 with a special guest, Eagles member Glenn Frey. Little River Band performed with Warren Zevon and Christopher Cross as special guest members and continued to tour internationally for at least three months every year after the Brisbane Expo. At this time he co-wrote three songs for Little River Band's album Monsoon, and in a joint acknowledgement of their emigration experience, co-wrote "I Dream Alone" with Glenn Shorrock for the Get Lucky album.

After the completion of a successful US tour in 1997, Pellicci played his last show with Little River Band in Biloxi, Mississippi and subsequently retired from the music business.

The classic line-up of Goble, Birtles, Pellicci, Shorrock, Briggs and McArdle reunited for a live performance of "Help Is on Its Way" at Little River Band's induction into the ARIA Hall of Fame in 2004.

== Solo artist ==
In 2026, Pellicci returned to recording as a solo artist after an extended period away from the music industry. In March 2026, Pellicci released his first solo album, Welcome to the Human Race, featuring the single "God Please Help The USA" co-written with former Little River Band producer John Boylan. In April 2026, Pellicci released the album, Country and Eastern.. In September 2026, Pellicci released the album, Il Profeta.
