= Lonesome Loser =

- British promotional single picture sleeve

Single by Little River Band

from the album First Under the Wire
- B-side: "Another Runway"/"Shut Down Turn Off"
- Released: July 1979
- Genre: Soft rock
- Length: 3:30 (promo version); 3:45 (single version); 3:59 (album version)
- Label: Capitol
- Songwriter: David Briggs
- Producers: John Boylan, Little River Band

Little River Band singles chronology
"Lady" (1978)	"Lonesome Loser" (1979)	"Cool Change" (1979)

Official audio
- "Lonesome Loser" by Little River Band on YouTube

"Lonesome Loser" is a song written by David Briggs and performed by Australian soft rock music group Little River Band. Released in July 1979 as the lead single from their fifth studio album First Under the Wire, the song peaked at number 19 on the Australian Kent Music Report singles chart. The song also peaked at No. 6 on the Billboard Hot 100, becoming the band's third top 10 hit and sixth overall top 40 hit in the United States.

== Track listings ==
Australian 7" (Capitol Records – CP-11972)
A. "Lonesome Loser" - 3:30
B. "Another Runway" - 6:28

US 7" single (Capitol Records – 4748)
A. "Lonesome Loser" - 3:59
B. "Shut Down Turn Off" - 3:50

== Chart performance ==
=== Weekly charts ===
Chart (1979)	Peak position
Australia (Kent Music Report)	19
Canada (RPM Top Singles)	3
Canada (RPM Adult Contemporary)	10
New Zealand (Recorded Music NZ)	31
US (Billboard Hot 100)	6
US (Adult Contemporary)	15
US (Cash Box Top 100)	7

=== Year-end charts ===
Chart (1979)	Rank
Canada (RPM Top Singles)	36
U.S. (Billboard Hot 100)	66
U.S. (Cash Box)	43
