= David Briggs (Australian musician) =

Australian musician and record producer

David Briggs AM
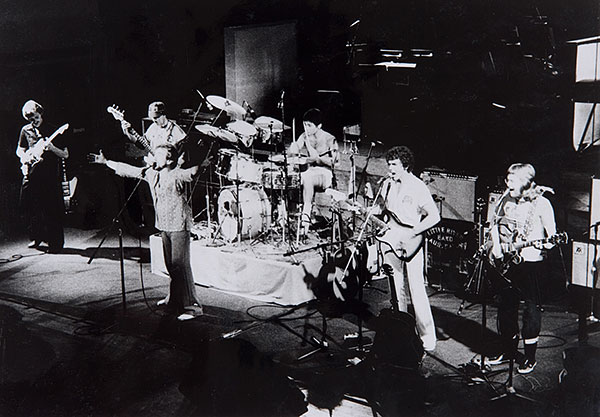
- Briggs, first from left, performing with Little River Band in 1977

Background information
- Born: David John Briggs; 26 January 1951 (age 75); Melbourne, Victoria, Australia
- Occupations: Musician, songwriter, record producer
- Instrument: Guitar
- Formerly of: Little River Band

David John Briggs AM (born 26 January 1951) is an Australian musician, songwriter and record producer, best known as lead guitarist in the rock band Little River Band between 1976 and 1981, having joined the band when original lead guitarist Ric Formosa left.

== Professional career ==
In 1976 he joined Little River Band. He wrote their hit single "Lonesome Loser" and co-wrote "Happy Anniversary", and played lead guitar on the albums Diamantina Cocktail, Sleeper Catcher, First Under the Wire, Backstage Pass, Live in America and Time Exposure.

Briggs also produced the rock band Australian Crawl and co-wrote their single "Hoochie Gucci Fiorucci Mama" with vocalist James Reyne. He produced Russell Morris' Almost Frantic album and started Rough Diamond Records with Ross Gardiner, a Melbourne-based music writer, which was distributed through Astor Records and then PolyGram. He signed the band No Fixed Address which was one of the first contemporary Aboriginal bands to record in Australia. Subsequently, the single "We Have Survived" was released, which was launched by Bob Hawke, the Prime Minister of Australia at the time. Briggs has also produced songs for artists, released on Rough Diamond.

Briggs works as a recording engineer and producer in Melbourne. Has worked on numerous records since starting the Production Workshop Recording Studio in 1979. Since 2002 he has been a lecturer at Victoria University, Melbourne, teaching Applied Acoustic Design and Advanced Digital Audio.

He was appointed a Member of the Order of Australia in the 2025 Australia Day Honours.
