= Beeb Birtles =

Australian musician, singer, songwriter and guitarist (born 1948)

Beeb Birtles AM
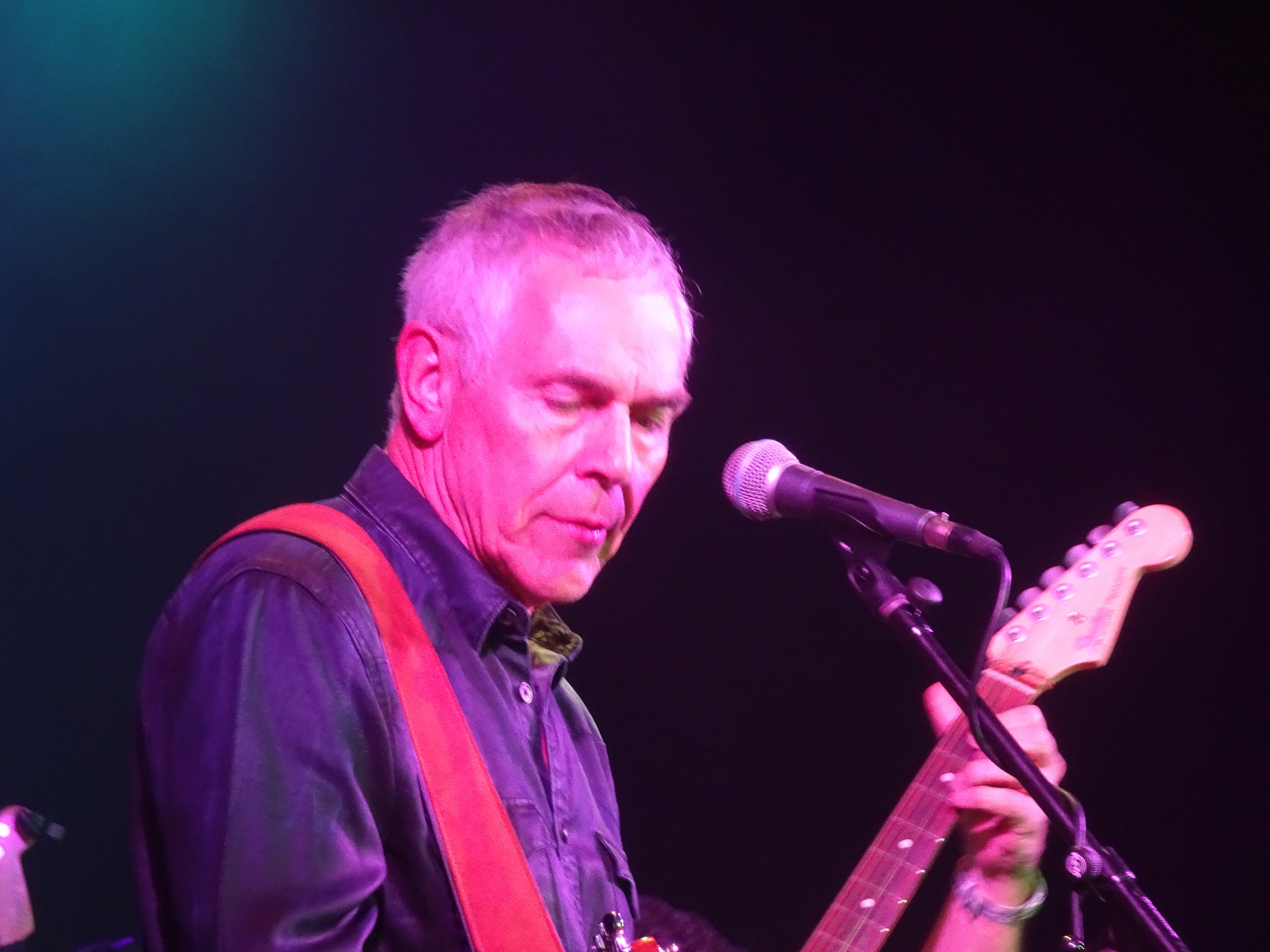
- Birtles in 2017

Background information
- Born: Gerard Bertelkamp; 28 November 1948 (age 77); Amsterdam, Netherlands
- Origin: Adelaide, South Australia, Australia
- Genres: Folk rock, pop rock, soft rock
- Occupations: Musician; singer; songwriter
- Instruments: Vocals; guitar; bass
- Years active: 1964–present
- Labels: Columbia; RCA; EMI; Capitol; MCA; Universal; Sonic Sorbet
- Formerly of: Zoot; Mississippi; Little River Band; Birtles & Goble; Birtles Shorrock Goble

Gerard Bertelkamp AM (born 28 November 1948), known professionally as Beeb Birtles, is an Australian musician, singer, songwriter and guitarist. He has been a member of various Australian groups including Zoot (1967–71), Mississippi (1972–74), Little River Band (1975–83) and Birtles Shorrock Goble (2002–07). He has also worked as a solo artist, including releasing an album, Driven by Dreams (2000). In 2004, Birtles and other members of the classic line-up of Little River Band were inducted into the ARIA Hall of Fame.

== Early life ==
Beeb Birtles was born on 28 November 1948 as Gerard Bertelkamp in Amsterdam, Netherlands, to Gerard Bertelkamp, Sr (30 May 1923 – 4 May 2000), a carpenter and building contractor, and Elisabeth Hendrika (née Deubel; 8 January 1924 – 2 December 2015). He has a younger sister, Elisabeth H (born 17 September 1952). Birtles later recalled seeing his parents singing in an amateur operetta in Amsterdam, saying that "I was very young and I went with my grandparents. They took me to the theatre to see my parents, and, er, I was so young that I actually called out my mother's name from the audience!"

The Bertelkamp family emigrated to Australia in September 1959 aboard MS Willem Ruys. The family settled in Adelaide where Birtles attended Netley Primary School – he was held back a year due to his language problems. He discovered a passion for music while attending Plympton High School. His mother taught him to sing: "after dinner at night, we would sing together. And she would take the melody and I would take the harmony." While at high school he was nicknamed "B. B. Eyes", after a Dick Tracy character from the associated TV cartoon show; it soon became "BB" and later "Beeb".

== Career ==
Timeline
1966	Times Unlimited
	Down The Line
1967	Zoot
1971	Frieze
1972	Mississippi
1975	Little River Band (including Birtles & Goble 1978–1980)
1983	Beeb Birtles
2002	Birtles Shorrock Goble
2007	Beeb Birtles (including reformed Zoot in 2011)

=== 1966-1974: Times Unlimited, Zoot, Frieze and Mississippi ===
In 1966 after high school Beeb Birtles, initially on lead guitar and harmony vocals, formed his first group, Times Unlimited, with his school mate John D'Arcy on guitars and vocals; they were joined by Ted Higgins on drums and a bass guitarist. D'Arcy was from Manchester and introduced Birtles to the music of the Hollies. When the bass guitarist left, Birtles took over that instrument and soon they asked Darryl Cotton to join on lead vocals.

Times Unlimited changed their name to Down the Line in homage to the Hollies' cover version of Roy Orbison's "Go Go Go (Down the Line)". During 1966, Down the Line played regular gigs in their home town, Adelaide, including a Friday night residency at Scot's Church, performing covers of English Mod groups: the Hollies, the Move, the Who and the Small Faces. By May 1967 they backed English-born singer Johnny Farnham and as session musicians they were used on demos, which secured Farnham's contract with EMI Records. One of the demos, "In My Room", became the B-side of Farnham's debut single, "Sadie (The Cleaning Lady)" (November 1967).

By June 1967 the group had changed their name to Zoot. They moved to Melbourne by mid-1968, where they recorded their debut single, "You'd Better Get Goin' Now". At this time Birtles adopted his professional name: Cotton had shortened his nickname to "Beeb", and Birtles anglicised the first two syllables of Bertelkamp. Birtles and Cotton co-wrote "Little Roland Lost", which was issued as the B-side of Zoot's June 1969 single, "Monty & Me". As a member of Zoot, Birtles appeared on all their recorded material including both of their studio albums, Just Zoot (1970) and Zoot Out (1971), but they broke up in May 1971.

After Zoot, Birtles and Cotton performed together as an eponymous pop, soft rock duo, Daryl and Beeb, which were renamed as Frieze for their sponsors – a clothing company. A teenage-themed newspaper, Go-Set, published its annual reader pop poll in July 1971 where Birtles appeared second as Best Bass Guitarist behind the Masters Apprentices member Glenn Wheatley. The duo issued an album, 1972 B. C., in May 1972, which was produced by Brian Cadd, but they disbanded in the next month.

In July 1972, Birtles was asked to join a folk rock band, Mississippi, which like Zoot had moved from Adelaide to Melbourne. The new line-up with Birtles on vocals and guitar, by October, were three of its founders, Graham Goble on vocals and guitar; Russ Johnson on vocals and guitar; John Mower on lead vocals (all ex-Allison Gros); and fellow new members Colin DeLuca on bass guitar (ex-Fugitives); and Derek Pellicci on drums (ex-Ash).

During 1973 the group issued a single, "Early Morning", which had been co-written by Birtles with Goble and Johnson. It peaked at No. 56 on the Australian Kent Music Report Singles Chart. In January 1974 Mississippi appeared at the Sunbury Pop Festival and then released another single, "Will I?", which was co-written by Birtles and former bandmate, Cotton. It reached No. 26. They toured the United Kingdom from May that year, where they "made little headway" and various members left the group. In London they met with fellow Australian musicians Glenn Shorrock (ex-Twilights) and Wheatley – both expressed a desire to return to Australia and work on a new version of Mississippi.

=== 1975-1984: Little River Band and Birtles & Goble ===
In early 1975 Mississippi band members Birtles, Goble, and Pellicci, had returned to Australia where they recruited Shorrock on lead vocals and Wheatley as their manager. They soon changed their name to Little River Band (LRB) and by year's end included Ric Formosa on guitar and Roger McLachlan on bass guitar. This line-up released their debut self-titled album in November, which was co-produced by Birtles, Goble, Shorrock and Wheatley. It peaked at No. 12 on the Kent Music Report Albums Chart. Their lead single, "Curiosity (Killed the Cat)", which was written by Birtles, appeared ahead of the album in September and reached No. 15 on the related singles chart. Soon after LRB moved to the United States and became "the first Australian band of the 1970s to gain significant international success, paving the way for AC/DC, Air Supply, Men at Work and INXS".

From 1978 to 1980 while still with LRB, Birtles & Goble also performed and recorded together as a duo, they issued three singles "Lonely Lives" (February 1978), "I'm Coming Home" (April 1979) and "How I Feel Tonight" (June 1980). In 1979 he had married Donna Brucks, the US assistant to LRB's booking agent. In May of the next year Birtles & Goble released an album, Last Romance. In a magazine interview, he told music industry writer Debbie Kruger: "I never felt 'pressured' to write hit songs because I've always written from my heart. In the early days quite a few of my songs were picked to be the singles and as we started to become more popular in the States, [Shorrock's] and [Goble's] songs were chosen to be the singles. We always left the choosing of the singles to the record label. As long as I had a few songs on each album, there were no complaints. We were selling millions of albums anyway, so people were still hearing my songs".

Birtles wrote or co-wrote several singles for the group; in addition to early hits "Curiosity (Killed the Cat)" (#15 AUS), "Everyday of My Life" (#29 AUS) and "Happy Anniversary" (#16 US, co-written with David Briggs), Birtles also co-wrote 1983's "You're Driving Me Out of My Mind", which was Little River Band's final top 40 US hit.

After a run of major international chart and critical successes from the late 1970s to the early 1980s, Birtles left LRB in October 1983.

By 1984, Birtles and wife Donna lived in Melbourne: they have two daughters, Hannah and Emmie. He gave his reasons for leaving the group: "I realised I was well and truly burned out from being on the road, travelling the world for eight years straight. It was the right decision at the time for me because my daughters were young and I got to spend their formative years at home with them".

=== 1992-2000: Driven by Dreams ===
In 1992, Birtles moved to the US with his family. They briefly settled in Donna's hometown of Jefferson City, Missouri, before moving to Nashville, where he and his wife still live – both daughters graduated from college in the US.

In 1998, Birtles and Bill Cuomo established Sonic Sorbet, a music production company. Sonic Sorbet has produced albums for a number of recording artists, including Birtles' first solo album, Driven by Dreams, released in 2000.

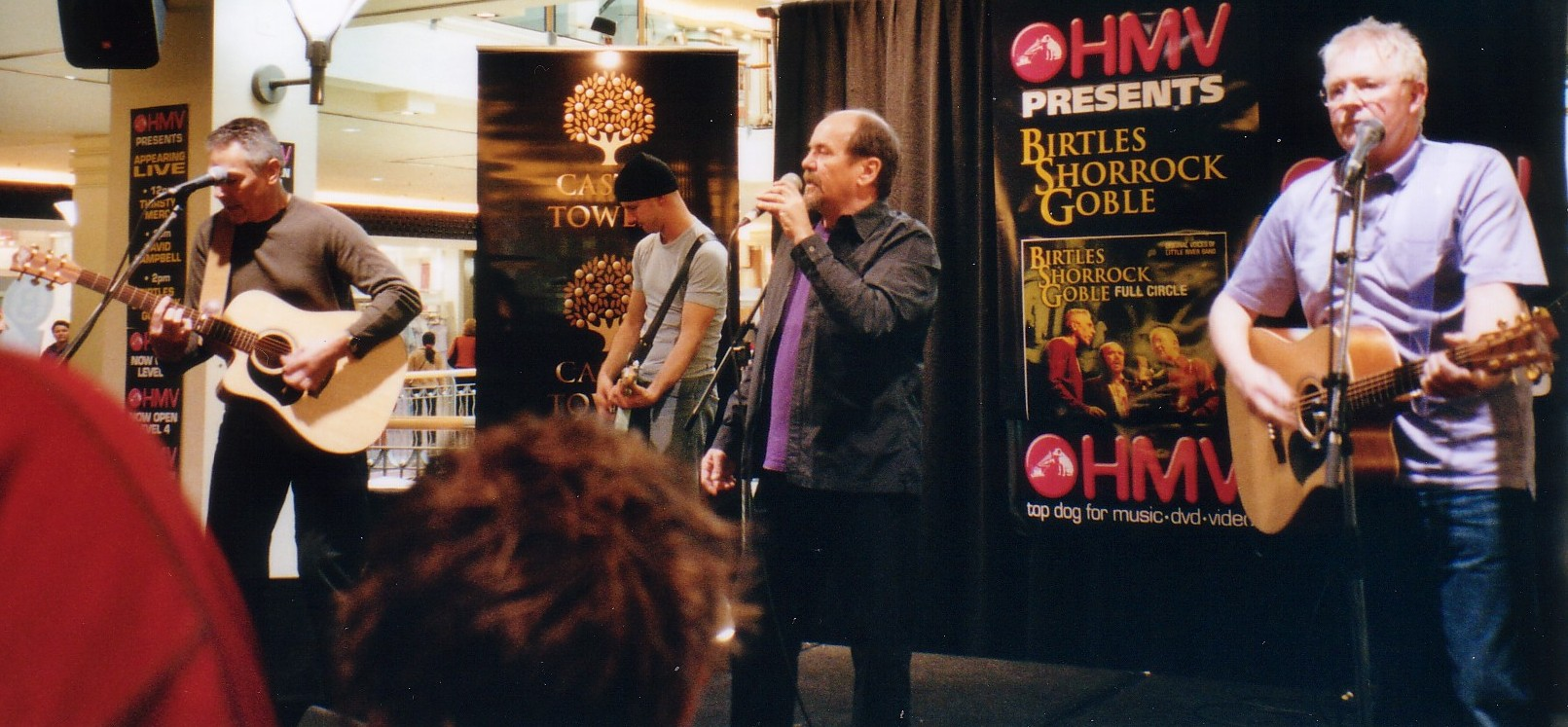
Birtles Shorrock Goble

=== 2001-2007: Birtles Shorrock Goble and ARIA and Australian Songwriter Hall of Fame ===
In 2001, Birtles rejoined with Shorrock and Goble to form Birtles Shorrock Goble. Initially they wanted to perform as "The Original Little River Band". However, they were not entitled to use the name Little River Band as it was legally owned by Stephen Housden, the group's guitarist from August 1981 to 2006, after previous members had been paid out upon leaving. Kruger described this situation coming about "due to clumsy paper work and general disinterest on the part of original band members as they each left the group in the 1990s". The group recorded the live album Full Circle, which was released in 2003.

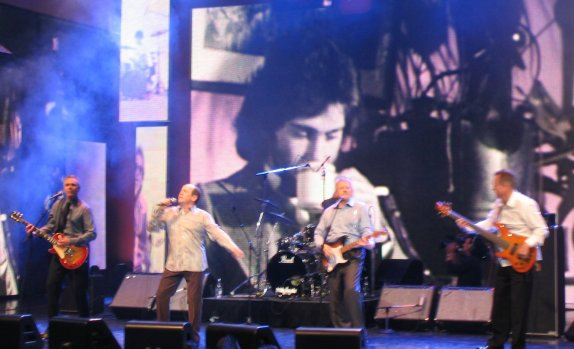
Little River Band's ARIA Music Hall Of Fame induction, 2004

At the ARIA Music Awards of 2004, Birtles and other members of the classic line-up of Little River Band were inducted into the ARIA Hall of Fame.

In 2004, Birtles Shorrock Goble won Classic Rock Performers of the Year at the 2004 Mo Awards and was inducted into the Australian Songwriters Association Hall of Fame.

In 2006, Birtles was inducted into the Australian Songwriters Hall of Fame.

=== 2008-present: Continued performance, autobiography and national award ===
In 2011 Birtles joined other key members of Zoot for a short performance cruise out from Miami. Further reunions of Zoot were prevented by the death of Darryl Cotton in July 2012. Birtles continued to write and produce music in Nashville.

In 2017, Birtles released his autobiography Every Day of My Life, published by Brolga Publishing (ISBN 1925367975).

Beeb was inducted into the South Australian Music Hall Of Fame on 24 November 2017, alongside Zoot bandmate Darryl Cotton and Barry Smith of the Town Criers. The ceremony took place at the German Club, Adelaide.

In the Australia Day honours of 2025. Birtles was appointed as a Member of the Order of Australia (AM).

== Discography ==
=== Solo studio albums ===
Title	Album details
The Last Romance (with Graeham Goble)	Released: 1980; Label: Capitol Records (ST.12078); Format: LP, Cassette
Driven by Dreams	Released: 25 April 2000; Label: Sonic Sorbet Records (SS7-0101-2)

=== Compilation albums ===
Title	Details
Beginnings (Before Little River Band) (with Glenn Shorrock & Graeham Goble)	Released: 1978; Label: Capitol Records; Format: Vinyl
Beginnings Vol. 2 (Before Little River Band) (with Glenn Shorrock & Graeham Goble)	Released: 1980; Label: Capitol Records; Format: Vinyl

=== See also ===
- Zoot (band)
- Mississippi (band)
- Little River Band
- Birtles Shorrock Goble

== Awards and nominations ==
=== Australian Songwriters Hall of Fame ===
The Australian Songwriters Hall of Fame was established in 2004 to honour the lifetime achievements of some of Australia's greatest songwriters.

Year	Nominee / work	Award	Result
2006	himself	Australian Songwriters Hall of Fame	inducted

=== Go-Set Pop Poll ===
The Go-Set Pop Poll was coordinated by teen-oriented pop music newspaper, Go-Set and was established in February 1966 and conducted an annual poll during 1966 to 1972 of its readers to determine the most popular personalities.

Year	Nominee / work	Award	Result
1971	himself	Best Bass Guitarist	2nd

=== King of Pop Awards ===
The King of Pop Awards were voted by the readers of TV Week. The King of Pop award started in 1967 and ran through to 1978.

Year	Nominee / work	Award	Result
1971	himself	Best Bass Guitarist	Won

=== Mo Awards ===
The Mo Awards, (technically The Australian Entertainment Mo Awards), are annual Australian entertainment industry awards. They recognise achievements in live entertainment in Australia.

Year	Nominee / work	Award	Result
2004	Birtles Shorrock Goble	Classical Rock Performers of the Year	Won

=== South Australian Music Awards ===
The South Australian Music Awards are an annual two-week celebration of live music, celebrating musical achievements of South Australia.

Year	Nominee / work	Award	Result
2017	himself	Hall Of Fame	inducted

=== TV Week / Countdown Awards ===
Countdown was an Australian pop music TV series on national broadcaster ABC-TV from 1974 to 1987, it presented music awards from 1979 to 1987, initially in conjunction with magazine TV Week. The TV Week / Countdown Awards were a combination of popular-voted and peer-voted awards.

Year	Nominee / work	Award	Result
1979	"I'm Coming Home" (by Birtles & Goble)	Best Recorded Songwriter	Nominated
