= Glenn Shorrock =

Australian singer (born 1944)

Glenn Shorrock AM
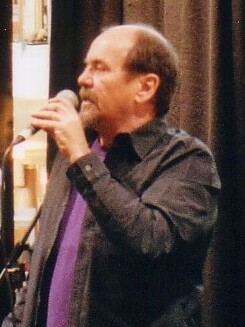
- Shorrock in 2007

Background information
- Also known as: André L'Escargot, Sharky
- Born: Glenn Barrie Shorrock; 30 June 1944 (age 82); Chatham, Kent, England
- Origin: Adelaide, South Australia, Australia
- Genres: Rock; pop; soft rock
- Occupations: Singer; songwriter
- Instruments: Vocals; guitar; piano; harmonica; percussion
- Years active: 1962–present
- Labels: MAM, Capitol, Mushroom, Liberation Blue
- Formerly of: The Checkmates; The Twilights; Axiom; Esperanto; Little River Band; Birtles Shorrock Goble
- Website: glennshorrock.com

Glenn Barrie Shorrock AM (born 30 June 1944) is an Australian singer and songwriter. He was a founding member of rock bands the Twilights, Axiom, Little River Band and post LRB spin-off trio Birtles Shorrock Goble, as well as being a solo performer.

The Twilights had eight consecutive national hit singles including "Needle in a Haystack" and "What's Wrong with the Way I Live". Axiom's top 10 hits were "Arkansas Grass", "Little Ray of Sunshine" and "My Baby's Gone". Little River Band had national and international chart success, including the Shorrock-penned "Emma", "Help Is on Its Way" and "Cool Change".

Shorrock was inducted into the Australian Recording Industry Association (ARIA) Hall of Fame as a solo artist in 1991 and as a member of Little River Band in 2004. In May 2001, the Australasian Performing Right Association (APRA), as part of its 75th-anniversary celebrations, named "Cool Change" as one of the APRA Top 30 Australian songs of all time.

== Early years ==
Glenn Barrie Shorrock was born on 30 June 1944 in Chatham, Kent, England. His family migrated to Adelaide, South Australia, on the Orcades in August 1954 when he was 10. His father, Harry Shorrock, was a Yorkshire-born fitter and turner at the Weapons Research Establishment in Salisbury, South Australia. The 1954–55 summer had days of 42 °C (108 °F) and Black Sunday bushfires ravaged the Adelaide Hills in January 1955. His London-born mother, Joyce Shorrock, was not impressed with Australia and she took Shorrock and his younger sister back to UK on the Strathmore, only to return to Australia on the Fairsea for a second attempt in 1956. The family settled in Elizabeth, 20 km (12 mi) north of Adelaide.

Shorrock's first public performance took place in 1958 at St Peter's Lutheran church hall in Elizabeth when he mimed to Elvis Presley's recording of "All Shook Up" on a gramophone and strumming on a cardboard guitar. When the record player stopped he was forced to continue singing by himself and realised he had a good voice.

In 1962, Shorrock formed his first band, the Checkmates, with Clem McCartney, Mike Sykes and Billy Volraat. They were a doo-wop harmony group covering the Platters and the Crew Cuts material. Sometimes teaming up with instrumental groups the Vector Men or the Hurricanes, the Checkmates performed in Adelaide cafes and folk clubs. As a result of the Beatles' popularity, members of the Checkmates and the Hurricanes merged to form the Twilights in 1964.

== The Twilights ==
Timeline
1962	The Checkmates
1964	The Twilights
1969	Axiom
1971	Glenn Shorrock
1972	Esperanto
1974	Glenn Shorrock
1975	Little River Band
1982	Glenn Shorrock
1988	Little River Band
1996	Glenn Shorrock
2002	Birtles Shorrock Goble
2007	Glenn Shorrock

In 1964 Shorrock, with McCartney as co-lead vocalist, formed the Twilights by merging with the Hurricanes' Frank Barnard on drums, Peter Brideoake on guitar, Terry Britten on guitar and John Bywaters on bass guitar. Their debut single, "I'll Be Where You Are", co-written by Shorrock and Britten, was released in June 1965. The band had eight consecutive hit singles, including covers of the Velvelettes' "Needle in a Haystack" and the Hollies' "What's Wrong with the Way I Live" (recorded at Abbey Road Studios in London). With two lead singers, two guitarists and five vocalists, the Twilights performed note-perfect covers of pop-rock songs and were famed for their live prowess. They relocated to Melbourne late in 1965 and were popular with teenage audiences and respected by fellow musicians. In July 1966, they won Hoadley's Battle of the Sounds with the prize including a trip to London. In 1967, shortly after returning from London, the group regularly performed the entire Sgt. Pepper's Lonely Hearts Club Band album live in sequence, weeks before it was released in Australia. The Twilights disbanded in January 1969 and Shorrock became band manager for Brisbane pop group the Avengers.

== Axiom ==
In May 1969 in Melbourne, Shorrock formed an early Australian "supergroup", Axiom, with Brian Cadd on keyboards and vocals, Don Mudie on lead guitar (both ex-the Groop), Doug Lavery (The Valentines) on drums and Chris Stockley (Cam-Pact) on guitar. They recorded two highly acclaimed albums, Fool's Gold and If Only ...; and had three top 10 singles, "Arkansas Grass", "Little Ray of Sunshine" and "My Baby's Gone" on the Go-Set national charts. Axiom travelled to the UK but disbanded there in March 1971.

Shorrock remained in the UK to pursue his solo career; he signed with MAM Records and released the self-penned "Let's Get the Band Together" single in October 1971. This was followed by a cover of "Rock and Roll Lullaby" in March 1972. As Andre L'Escargot and His Society Syncopaters, he released "Purple Umbrella" with his backing band being Quartet members Britten, Kevin Peek, Trevor Spencer and Alan Tarney. He joined the multinational progressive rock band Esperanto, which released their debut album, Esperanto Rock Orchestra, in 1973 with the Shorrock-written track "Statue of Liberty". He left Esperanto before their third album was released in 1974 and performed backing vocals for Cliff Richard.

== Little River Band ==
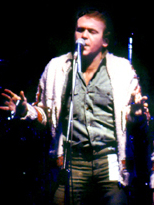
Glenn Shorrock performing in 1979

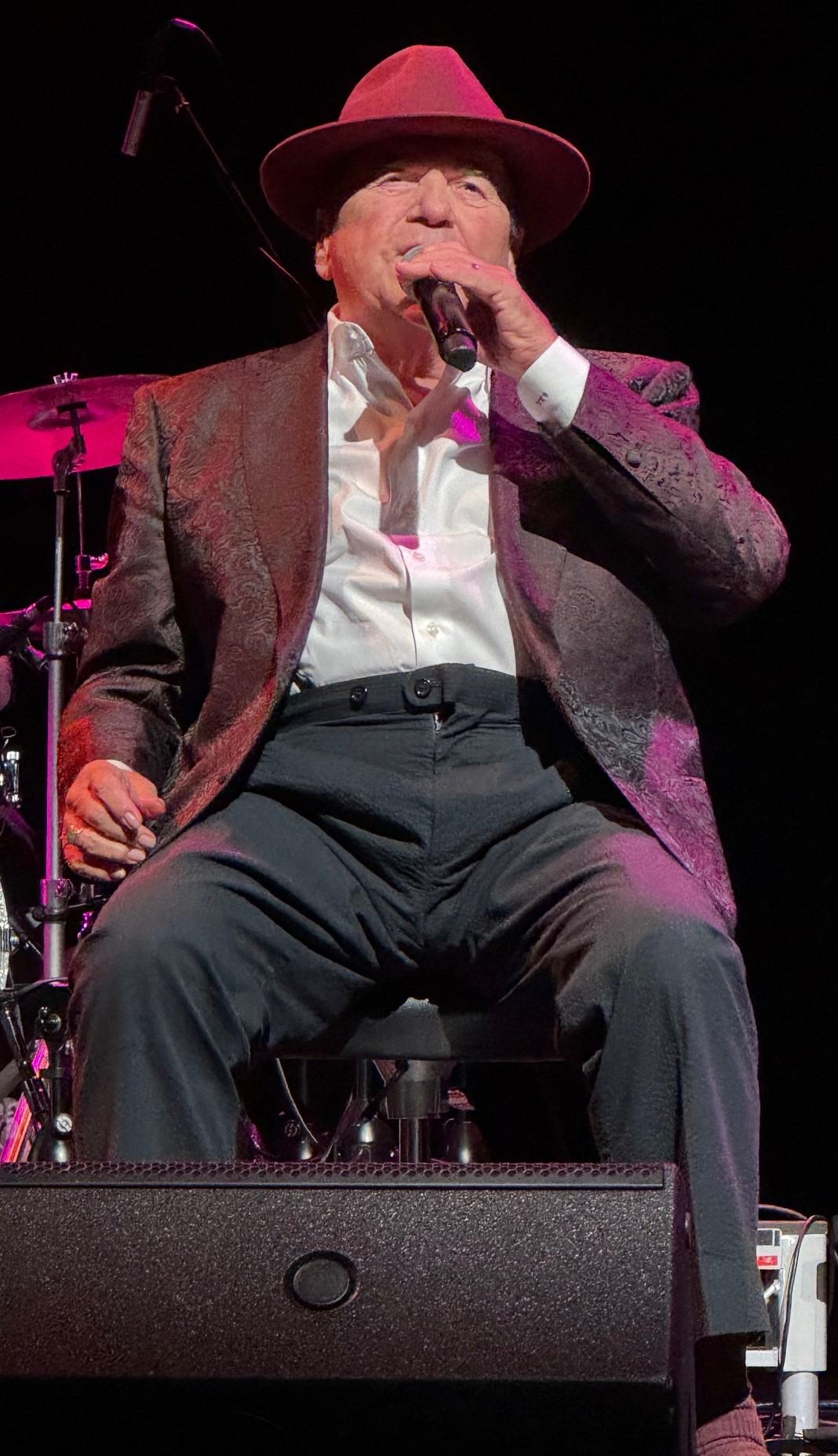
Glenn Shorrock performing in 2026

Mississippi was an Australian rock band which was working in the UK, with Beeb Birtles on vocals and guitar, Graham Goble (later Graeham Goble) on guitar and vocals and Derek Pellicci on drums. They contacted Glenn Wheatley (former bass guitarist for the Masters Apprentices) to become their manager. Birtles, previously in Adelaide band Zoot, called Shorrock to take part in the line up. Shorrock returned to Australia in October 1974 and joined Mississippi in January 1975 in Melbourne. They were soon renamed as Little River Band with the original line up of Birtles, Goble, Pellicci, Shorrock and lead guitarist Ric Formosa and bassist Roger McLachlan. The group went on to become one of the most successful bands ever to come out of Australia and the first to achieve major commercial success in the United States. For Little River Band, Shorrock wrote the hits "Emma", "Help Is on Its Way" (Australian No. 1) and "Cool Change".

While still a member of Little River Band, Shorrock released a solo single, a cover of Bobby Darin's 1959 hit "Dream Lover" in April 1979 on EMI, which peaked at No. 8 on the Kent Music Report singles chart. In February 1982, Shorrock left Little River Band and was replaced by John Farnham who was managed by Wheatley. Shorrock returned to Little River Band in 1987 but, despite several quality albums, they did not regain the earlier stellar recognition. He left again in 1996 leaving the naming rights with guitarist Stephen Housden. In May 2001 the Australasian Performing Right Association (APRA), as part of its 75th-anniversary celebrations, named "Cool Change" as one of the Top 30 Australian songs of all time.

== Later solo career ==
In 1982, Shorrock released the solo album Villain of the Peace and a single, "Rock and Roll Soldier", on Capitol Records recorded in Los Angeles with John Boylan (Charlie Daniels, Little River Band) producing. "Rock and Roll Soldier" reached the Australian top 40 in November but he did not achieve the international success attained with Little River Band. Late in 1982 he toured Australia and then teamed with Renée Geyer to release a duet, "Goin' Back", on Mushroom Records in February 1983. One of his backing singers was Wendy Matthews who had been a session singer in Los Angeles. "We're Coming to Get You", which peaked at No. 6 in October, was recorded with folk group, the Bushwackers. It was the theme for the film We're Coming to Get You. He released "Don't Girls Get Lonely?" in November. In 1984, he recorded "Restless" for the documentary World Safari II: The Final Adventure.

In 1985, Shorrock released The First Twenty Years, which was a double-LP album compilation of his career work with tracks by the Twilights, Axiom and Little River Band as well as solo work. He was compere of Australian Broadcasting Corporation (ABC) TV music series Rock Arena in 1986 and as a breakfast announcer for radio station Magic 11 in Sydney. His solo single, "American Flyers", appeared in July. He performed on the tour of the stage show One for the Money in 1986–87. He appeared in other stage shows including Evita (1989) and his own showcase productions Go Cat Go (1990–91) and Two Up (1996).

On 25 March 1991, Shorrock was inducted into the Australian Recording Industry Association (ARIA) Hall of Fame, alongside contemporary rocker Billy Thorpe, bass-baritone Peter Dawson and jazz musician Don Burrows. In 1993, he re-joined with Axiom bandmate Brian Cadd to record Blazing Salads and three singles for Blue Martin Records as well as a subsequent two-year tour. On tour Shorrock played his hit songs, along with those of Axiom accompanied by Cadd and a backing band of Rex Goh on guitar (ex-Air Supply), Kirk Lorange on guitar (Richard Clapton Band) and Mark Kennedy on drums (Spectrum, Ayers Rock, Marcia Hines Band).

Long Way to the Top was a 2001 ABC TV six-part documentary on the history of Australian rock and roll from 1956 to the modern era. Shorrock provided some interviews, "In Awe of The Beatles", "Being Pop Stars" and "Coming from the UK", about his early years with the Twilights. A Long Way to the Top Tour followed in August–September 2002 with Shorrock appearing with the Twilights in the first set performing "What's Wrong with the Way I Live?" and "Needle in a Haystack"; he returned in the second set with Axiom to perform "Arkansas Grass" and "Little Ray of Sunshine".

In 2002, Shorrock reunited with other Little River Band founders Beeb Birtles and Graeham Goble to form Birtles Shorrock Goble. On 17 October 2004, the 1970s members of Little River Band: Birtles, David Briggs, Goble, George McArdle, Derek Pellicci and Shorrock, were inducted into the ARIA Hall of Fame. The later members, including fellow Australian John Farnham and US-based musicians, were not included in this induction. Due to a 2002 legal ruling on their right to use the band's name, they performed "Help Is on the Way" as the "classic lineup" of Little River Band. Birtles Shorrock Goble recorded a successful DVD and CD, Full Circle (2005), and toured until 2007. In August–September, the trio played a medley of Little River Band hits at the Countdown Spectacular two concert series.

In 2005, Shorrock also undertook his career-spanning "The Reminiscing Tour – Glenn Shorrock & Friends" with invited guest singers including Doug Parkinson and Wendy Matthews. In May–June 2006, he partnered actress Judy Nunn on the first season of a reality TV singing competition, It Takes Two. They were voted off after week three. His first solo CD for seven years, Meanwhile, which contains acoustic versions of his career hits was released in 2007 on the Liberation Blue label. He performed a Beatles tribute show, Let It Be, with Parkinson, Sharon O'Neill and Mark Williams.

In 2008, Shorrock toured with the musical Shout! The Legend of the Wild One based on the life of Australian rocker Johnny O'Keefe. In July 2010, Shorrock performed a retrospective of his 45 years in the music industry. Currently Shorrock continues to tour Australia performing for public and private events in Australia and promotes new local music artists. In early 2013 he and his band were headlining performers in Macau, New York and London for the media launch of the Titanic II project. This was at the personal invitation of Australian entrepreneur Clive Palmer.

In October 2014, Shorrock was inducted into the South Australian Music Hall of Fame alongside Bon Scott's former band Fraternity as well as Chris Finnen and David Day. He released his autobiography, Now, Where Was I?, in June 2018. Shorrock was appointed a member of the Order of Australia (AM) on 26 January 2020, with a citation for significant service to the performing arts as a singer, songwriter and entertainer. In 2022 he took the role of Duncan in the Australian drama film, A Stitch in Time.

== Personal life ==
Shorrock met his first wife, Sue Doran, a Melbourne nurse, in 1966. The couple married in 1967 but divorced in 1971. In 1975, Shorrock met Jo Swan, a video producer, who worked in the same building (Armstrong Studios) where Little River Band were recording their first album. They married in 1980, separated in 2019 and divorced in 2020. Shorrock married Irene Rose, a teacher, on 21 December 2021. He has at times had arthritis, anxiety and stage fright. As from 2024 Shorrock has Parkinson's disease, and resides in Port Douglas, Queensland.

== Discography ==
=== Studio albums ===
List of studio albums, with selected chart positions
Title	Album details	Peak chart positions
Title	Album details	AUS
Villain of the Peace	Released: November 1982; Label: Capitol; Format: Vinyl, cassette	32
Spin Me 'Round	Released: 2000; Label: Streetwise Music Group; Format: CD	—
Meanwhile... Acoustically	Released: March 2007; Label: Liberation Blue; Format: CD, digital download	—
The Story of Sharky & the Caddman (with Brian Cadd)	Released: October 2013; Label: Fanfare; Format: CD, digital download	148
Rise Again	Released: 9 September 2016; Label: Social Family; Format: CD, digital download	130
Glenn Shorrock Sings Little River Band	Released: 8 March 2019; Label: Social Family; Format: CD, digital download, streaming	—

=== Live albums ===
List of live albums
Title	Album details	Peak chart positions
Title	Album details	AUS
45 Years of Song	Released: August 2013; Label: Aztec Music; Format: 2×CD	—
Legendary – The Ultimate Collection	Released: 2 October 2026; Label: Ambition Records; Format: 2×CD	34

=== Compilation albums ===
List of compilation albums, with selected chart positions
Title	Album details	Peak chart positions
Title	Album details	AUS
Beginnings (Before Little River Band) (with Beeb Birtles & Graham Goble)	Released: 1978; Label: Capitol; Format: Vinyl	—
Beginnings Vol. 2 (Before Little River Band) (with Beeb Birtles & Graham Goble)	Released: 1980; Label: Capitol; Format: Vinyl	—
The First Twenty Years	Released: October 1985; Label: J&B, EMI; Format: 2×vinyl, 2×CD, cassette	63

=== Charted singles ===
Year	Title	Peak chart positions	Album
Year	Title	AUS	Album
1979	"Dream Lover"	8	Non-album single
1982	"Rock and Roll Soldier"	39	Villain of the Peace
1983	"We're Coming to Get You"	6	Non-album single
1983	"Don't Girls Get Lonely"	75	Villain of the Peace (1983 re-release)
"—" denotes a recording that did not chart or was not released in that territory.

=== Other singles ===
Year	Title
1977	"Rock Around the Clock" (released to commemorate the 21st Anniversary of the release of "Rock Around the Clock") (with Renée Geyer, Frankie J. Holden, John Paul Young, Daryl Braithwaite and Graeme Strachan)
2019	"Help Is On Its Way" (with Wendy Matthews, The McClymonts, Beccy Cole, Jasmine Rae, Travis Collins, Busby Marou and Fanny Lumsden)

== Awards and nominations ==
=== ARIA Music Awards ===
The ARIA Music Awards is an annual awards ceremony which recognises excellence, innovation and achievement across all genres of Australian music. They commenced in 1987. Shorrock was inducted into the ARIA Hall of Fame in 1991.

Year	Nominee / work	Award	Result	Ref.
1991	himself	ARIA Hall of Fame	inductee	
2014	The Story of Sharky and The Caddman (with Brian Cadd)	Best Original Soundtrack, Cast or Show Album	Nominated	

=== Australian Songwriter's Hall of Fame ===
The Australian Songwriters Hall of Fame was established in 2004 to honour the lifetime achievements of some of Australia's greatest songwriters.

Year	Nominee / work	Award	Result
2006	himself	Australian Songwriter's Hall of Fame	inducted

=== King of Pop Awards ===
The King of Pop Awards were voted by the readers of TV Week. The awards began in 1967 and ended in 1978.

Year	Nominee / work	Award	Result
1977	himself	Best Australian Songwriter	Won

=== Mo Awards ===
The Australian Entertainment Mo Awards, commonly known as the Mo Awards, were annual entertainment industry awards held from 1975 to 2016 which recognised achievements in live entertainment in Australia. Shorrock won an award in 2015.

Year	Nominee / work	Award	Result (wins only)
2015	Glenn Shorrock	Hall of Fame	inducted

== Sources and further reading ==
- Kimball, Duncan (2002). "Australasian popular music of the 1960s and 1970s – an overview". Milesago: Australasian Music & Popular Culture 1964–1975. Ice Productions. Archived from the original on 31 October 2010.
- McFarlane, Ian (1999). "Whammo Homepage". Encyclopedia of Australian Rock and Pop. St Leonards, NSW: Allen & Unwin. ISBN 1-86508-072-1. Archived from the original on 5 April 2004. Note: Archived on-line copy has limited functionality.
- McKenzie, Stephen (11 June 2010). "All you need is Glenn". Melbourne Weekly (The Age). Fairfax Media. Archived from the original on 17 July 2010.
- Spencer, Chris; Zbig Nowara, Paul McHenry with notes by Ed Nimmervoll (2002) [1987]. The Who's Who of Australian Rock. Noble Park, Vic.: Five Mile Press. ISBN 1-86503-891-1. Note: online version established at White Room Electronic Publishing Pty Ltd in 2007 and was expanded from the 2002 edition.
