= In Search of Amelia Earhart =

Studio album by Plainsong
- Released: 6 October 1972
- Recorded: 8–30 June 1972
- Studio: Sound Techniques, London
- Genre: Country rock/Folk rock
- Length: 39:28
- Label: Elektra
- Producer: Sandy Roberton

Ian Matthews chronology
Tigers Will Survive (1972)	In Search of Amelia Earhart (1972)	Valley Hi (1973)

Plainsong chronology
In Search of Amelia Earhart (1972)	On Air (1992)

Professional ratings
Review scores
Source	Rating
Allmusic	4/5 stars

In Search of Amelia Earhart is the 1972 debut album by Plainsong. It was released on October 6, 1972, by Elektra Records.

Plainsong was a British country rock/folk rock band, formed in early 1972 by Ian (later Iain) Matthews, formerly of Fairport Convention and Matthews Southern Comfort, and Andy Roberts, previously of The Liverpool Scene. The band's line-up consisted of Matthews, Roberts, Dave Richards (died January 2019) and Bob Ronga (died November 2012). The original group lasted basically a year, splitting up in December 1972. Ronga had already left the band by then due to a drinking problem and Matthews and Richards did not see eye to eye over their musical direction during the recording of a planned second album, the unissued Plainsong III. Both Matthews and Roberts resumed making solo albums in 1973 following Plainsong's demise.

Ian Matthews played in four different band incarnations within three years. He had left Fairport Convention to form his own band, Matthews Southern Comfort, put out two solo LPs for Vertigo Records, and then started the band Plainsong. It is probably fair to say that In Search of Amelia Earhart is the pinnacle of Matthews' work in the 1970s. Working with producer Sandy Roberton (Hard Meat, Steeleye Span, Shirley Collins), Ian and bandmates, notably Andy Roberts who shared vocals on the album, created an atypical British folk album conceived around the idea of the legends surrounding Amelia Earhart and her supposed demise. Both Matthews and Roberts had read the 1966 book The Search for Amelia Earhart by CBS news correspondent Fred Goerner hypothesizing that Earhart and her flying companion Frederick Noonan had crashed around the Japanese held Marshall Islands area and been taken prisoner by the Japanese on Saipan, in the Marianas, in 1937. Their Lockheed Electra plane had supposedly been outfitted with aerial cameras and had a bigger fuel tank than anyone outside of the US government knew. After being grilled by Japanese interrogators Earhart would perish of dysentery, and Noonan was beheaded by the Japanese according to this still unproven theory.

The album at the time was widely perceived as being a concept album, but not all of the songs on the album are directly about Amelia Earhart. But the album carries that somber, mellow tone in which so much great folk music of the early ’70s was in touch. Many of the songs are about seeing and reaching for light, whether they be the light of day or the light of death. So in a way the album is more about the way people felt about, cared about and thought about Amelia Earhart and her death. That she is still considered a heroine of aviation and a distinctly American hero keeps the mystery of what happened to her in the greater cultural imagination.

== CD reissues ==
In Search of Amelia Earhart was unavailable on CD for many years, being first issued as a Japanese-only CD by Warner-Elektra in 1991. It was more widely reissued on Matthews' own label Perfect Pitch in 2001, and again more recently by Man In The Moon Records in 2016.

Plainsong’s unissued second album Plainsong III, now retitled Now We Are 3, finally saw the light of day in 2005 in a 2CD re-issue by Water Records. Simply entitled Plainsong, CD1 features In Search of Amelia Earhart plus various radio recordings and a demo of "I'll Fly Away". CD2 features Now We Are 3, live recordings and two singles, "Along Comes Mary" and "Even The Guiding Light".

== Track listing ==
1. "For the Second Time" (Ian Matthews) - 3:51
2. "Yo Yo Man" (Rick Cunha, Marty Cooper) - 2:13
3. "Louise" (Paul Siebel) - 3:18
4. "Call the Tune" (Ian Matthews) - 5:22
5. "Diesel on My Tail" (Jim Fagan) - 2:03
6. "Amelia Earhart's Last Flight" (Dave McEnery) - 4:05
7. "I'll Fly Away" (Albert E. Brumley) - 2:03
8. "True Story of Amelia Earhart" (Ian Matthews) - 4:32
9. "Even the Guiding Light" (Ian Matthews) - 4:12
10. "Side Roads" (Ian Matthews) - 3:29
11. "Raider" (Jerry Yester, Judy Henske) - 4:32

== Personnel ==
- Ian Matthews - vocals, acoustic guitar, percussion
- Andy Roberts - vocals, electric and acoustic guitars, Kriwaczek string organ, dulcimer
- Dave Richards - bass and piano
- Bob Ronga - 12- and 6-string acoustic guitars
- Timi Donald - drums
- Dave Mattacks - drums on “Call The Tune”
- Martin Jenkins - mandocello on “Diesel On My Tail”, fiddle on “Raider”

== Production ==
- Producer: Sandy Roberton
- Recording Engineer: Jerry Boys at Sound Techniques, London
- Sleeve Design: Seabrook Graves Aslett
- Photography: Harry Isles, Jeremy Ensor
- Liner Notes: Fred Goerner
