= Andy Roberts (musician) =

- Born: Andrew Jonathan Roberts; 12 June 1946 (age 79); Harrow, Middlesex, England
- Genres: Rock, folk rock
- Occupations: Singer-songwriter, composer
- Instruments: Guitar, mandolin, dulcimer, bouzouki, bodhran
- Years active: 1960s–present
- Labels: RCA, Elektra
- Website: andyrobertsmusic.com

Andrew Jonathan Roberts (born 12 June 1946 in Hatch End near Harrow, Middlesex, England) is an English musician, guitarist and singer-songwriter, perhaps best known for his 37-year partnership with singer Iain Matthews in the English folk rock band, Plainsong.

When he was nine years old, Roberts took up learning to play the violin and gained a violin scholarship to Felsted School in Essex. At the same time he also developed a talent for playing guitar, and became a member of various school bands. In 1965 he went to Liverpool University to study Law, and whilst there teamed up with poet Roger McGough, becoming the lone guitarist accompanying The Scaffold, and then joining The Liverpool Scene, with McGough and fellow Liverpool poet Adrian Henri. He has also played with Roy Harper, Chris Spedding, Hank Wangford, Kevin Ayers, Vivian Stanshall and Grimms, and has played on many sessions for artists such as Richard Thompson, Cat Stevens, Paul Korda and Maddy Prior.

He was a backing guitarist in the "surrogate band" during Pink Floyd's The Wall tour in 1981 (replacing Snowy White) and can be heard on the live Pink Floyd album Is There Anybody Out There? The Wall Live 1980–81. He has also written film scores, themes for TV series, backed Billy Connolly, provided music and voice for Spitting Image and continues to create musical backdrops for the poetry of Roger McGough.

== The Scaffold and The Liverpool Scene ==
When he was eighteen, Roberts and a friend were playing at a late-night review at the 1964 Edinburgh Festival. During his time there he not only met Vivian Stanshall of the Bonzo Dog Doo-Dah Band, with whom he would later play in the band Grimms, but also the Liverpool comedy trio The Scaffold, whose members included poet Roger McGough, John Gorman and Paul McCartney's brother, Mike McGear. At the same time he also met Liverpool poet Adrian Henri, with whom he would subsequently work sporadically, and with whom he would make his first album in 1967.

After he got back to London he accepted a place at Liverpool University to read Law and on the day he got there in 1965 bumped into Roger McGough in a bookshop. McGough later suggested some poetry and music collaborative gigs, so with Roberts providing backing guitar to the poetry of McGough and Henri, they appeared together for the first time in February 1966 at The Bluecoat Theatre in Liverpool. Things took off from there and within a couple of months, Roberts was doing poetry events at The Cavern Club and playing with a band at the university.

On the back of a 1967 poetry anthology entitled The Liverpool Scene, Henri, McGough and Roberts, along with jazz saxophonist Mike Evans and songwriter/guitarist Mike Hart, were taking bookings as ‘The Liverpool Scene Poets’. Roberts was also recording with McGough's music/comedy outfit The Scaffold, on a series of singles which included their breakthrough hits "Thank U Very Much" and "Lily the Pink". With The Scaffold's success McGough dropped out of the poetry gigs, leaving Roberts to suggest to Henri that all they needed was a bassist and drummer to become a bona fide band. Percy Jones and Bryan Dodson (later replaced by Pete Clarke) filled those roles respectively and The Liverpool Scene was born.

Roberts graduated from university in 1968 and immediately turned professional and went on the road with The Liverpool Scene. The band made four albums between 1968 and 1970 and toured the UK extensively, including Led Zeppelin's first tour in 1969 along with Blodwyn Pig, and playing to some 150,000 people at the July 1969 Isle of Wight Festival on the same day as Bob Dylan and The Band. They also toured the United States later in 1969, on one gig in Detroit sharing the bill with Joe Cocker & The Grease Band, The Kinks, Grand Funk Railroad and The James Gang. The band broke up in May 1970.

== Plainsong ==
Roberts formed the folk-rock band Plainsong in early 1972 with former Fairport Convention and Matthews Southern Comfort singer, Iain Matthews, on whose first solo album he had played guitar, and with whom he had earlier toured the United States alongside Richard Thompson in autumn 1971. The other two members of the band were Dave Richards (died January 2019), who played bass and piano and had been a member of both Sandy Denny's band and Roberts' Everyone band, and Bob Ronga (died November 2012), an American bass player who had earlier been the tour manager for Matthews, Roberts and Thompson on that 1971 tour. The band's name was picked on a whim when they randomly opened a copy of The Concise Oxford Dictionary of Music to find Plainsong at pages 450–451.

After a month of rehearsals, Plainsong hit the road in February, touring both the UK and the Netherlands. They also signed to Elektra Records and recorded their first album, In Search of Amelia Earhart, which was released in October 1972. The album mixed songs by both Matthews and Roberts with several covers, including versions of "Red River Dave" McEnery's song "Amelia Earhart's Last Flight", Paul Siebel's "Louise" and Jerry Yester and Judy Henske's "Raider". The album also included "True Story Of Amelia Earhart's Last Flight", a Matthews song based on research that suggests that Amelia Earhart on her round-the-world flight in 1937 may have been spying on Japanese bases in the Pacific islands; and "Even the Guiding Light", a response to Richard Thompson's "Meet on the Ledge".

Now viewed with classic album status, In Search Of Amelia Earhart was critically well-received at the time, but was not particularly a commercial success. The group recorded several radio sessions for the BBC and toured extensively with drummer Roger Swallow added to the line-up. Ronga, however, left the band due to a drinking problem and thus they began recording a second album, Now We Are 3, as a trio. Disagreements on the direction the album should take between Matthews and Richards occurred and in the event its release never came to fruition, leading to the break-up of the band. Roberts and Matthews each then began recording again as solo artists.

Apart from in Japan, In Search of Amelia Earhart was unavailable on CD until its reissue in 2001. Several albums of archive recordings of Plainsong have also been released on CD since the 1990s, including And That's That – The Demos, comprising recordings made for the band's unreleased second album, and two versions of On Air containing BBC recordings from 1972.

In 1991, some eighteen years after the original band broke up, Roberts encountered Matthews again when he was performing in a pub in Brighton, and the two decided to revive Plainsong. Adding Mark Griffiths and Julian Dawson, they recorded three albums – Dark Side of the Room (1992), Voices Electric (1994), and Sister Flute (1996) – before Dawson left to pursue a solo career. His replacement was Clive Gregson, once of Any Trouble and later Gregson & Collister. The new line-up then recorded New Place Now in 1999, before Matthews and Roberts recorded a six-track mini-album in 2001, A To B, as a duo under the Plainsong name. For the next Plainsong album, Pangolins in 2003, Dawson rejoined the band replacing Gregson.

In its various line-ups, Plainsong performed and toured throughout the 1990s and 2000s. Their final album as a quartet, Fat Lady Singing, recorded live in the studio, was released in 2012, that year marking the 40th anniversary of the formation of the band. Plainsong undertook a 40th Anniversary Farewell tour of Germany, Holland and the UK before disbanding. Their performance at Norderstedt in Germany on 4 September 2012 was recorded live and broadcast on NDR Radio. The tour culminated with two dates in Japan in October 2012.

In 2014, Roberts and Matthews decided to record some of the songs of Richard Fariña, to mark the approaching 50th anniversary of his death. With Griffiths back on board as well, the decision to use the Plainsong name made sense, and the group was again re-activated. The album Reinventing Richard: The Songs Of Richard Fariña was released in 2015. In July 2016, the trio played a handful of UK shows beginning at Whitstable in Kent, with US and European dates following later in September and October. The same Plainsong line-up came back together again for the Cropredy Festival in August 2017, celebrating Fairport Convention's 50th anniversary. The reformed band played a 12-song set featuring mostly songs from the Reinventing Richard and Amelia Earhart albums.

== Discography ==
=== Solo albums ===
- Home Grown (RCA SF8086, 1970)

With: Roger Powell, Mike 'Ace' Evans, Gordon Huntley, Ian Whiteman – Arrangements by Dave Palmer – Produced by Sandy Roberton.

Original 14-track vinyl release on RCA Records 1970. Released on CD by Strange Days Records in 2005 with one bonus track.

- Home Grown (B&C CAS1034, 1971)

With: Roger Powell, Mike 'Ace' Evans, Gordon Huntley, Ian Whiteman – Arrangements by Dave Palmer – Produced by Sandy Roberton.

A shortened 10-track vinyl release 1971 on B&C Records in the UK, and Philips in the Netherlands. A different 8-track version of Home Grown was also released in 1971 on Ampex Records in the US and Canada.

- Nina and the Dream Tree (Pegasus PEG 5, 1971)

With: Iain Matthews, Roger Powell, Charlene Collins, Gerry Conway, Zoot Money, Mac and Katie Kissoon, Mike London, John Pearson, Dave Richards, Ray Warleigh – Produced by Sandy Roberton.

Original vinyl release on Pegasus 1971, also released on Philips in the Netherlands. Released on CD by Strange Days Records in 2005.

- Everyone (band project) (B&C CAS1028, 1971)

With: Dave Richards, John Pearson, John Porter and Bob Sargeant – Produced by Sandy Roberton.

Original vinyl release on B&C Records 1971 in the UK, as 'Andy Roberts With Everyone' in the US on Ampex Records.

- Urban Cowboy (Elektra K42139, 1973)

With: Iain Matthews, Dave Richards, Bob Ronga, Timi Donald, B.J. Cole, Richard Thompson, Dick Parry, Mike Kellie, Neil Innes, Martin Carthy, Gerry Conway – Produced by Sandy Roberton.

Original vinyl release on Elektra 1973. Released on CD by Fledg'ling Records in 2012.

- Andy Roberts and the Great Stampede (Elektra K42151, 1974)

With: Zoot Money, B.J. Cole, Pat Donaldson, Sonny Francis, Ollie Halsall, Mik Kaminski, Ray Wehrstein – Produced by Sandy Roberton.

Original vinyl release on Elektra 1974. Released on CD by Fledg'ling Records in 2007 with five bonus tracks.

- Loose Connections – Not Exactly A Love Story (Virgin Records V2306, 1984)

With: Keith Nelson, Peter Dennis, B.J. Cole, Howard Tibble, Steve Simpson, Ricky Cool, Graham Preskett, Pete Wingfield, Bobby Valentino.

=== Compilation albums ===
- Andy Roberts (Charisma CS.6, 1973)

10-track vinyl compilation on Charisma Perspective – Produced by Sandy Roberton and John Peel (tracks 2 and 4).

- From Time To Time (Big Ben Records BBX 503, 1985)

7-track vinyl compilation on Big Ben Records – Produced by Sandy Roberton.

- The Best Of Andy Roberts (Mooncrest CRESTCD 014, 1992)

16-track CD compilation featuring tracks from 'Home Grown', 'Everyone' and 'Nina And The Dream Tree'.

- Just For The Record – The Solo Anthology 1969–76 (Castle Music CMEDD 1084, 2006)

33-track 2CD compilation.

- Cut-Outs (Vinyl Japan, JASK CD174, 2006)

Japan-only release in a limited edition of 500 copies to coincide with Roberts' dates in Tokyo in 2006. Compilation of mostly unreleased songs, demos, out-takes, radio cuts, etc.

=== Plainsong ===
- In Search Of Amelia Earhart (1972 vinyl) UK and US Elektra
- In Search Of Amelia Earhart (1991 CD) Japan Elektra / Warner-Pioneer Corporation
- And That’s That – The Demos (1992) Taxim Records
- On Air – Original BBC Recordings (1992) Band of Joy (BBC recordings from 1972)
- Dark Side of the Room (1992) Line
- Voices Electric (1994) Line
- Sister Flute (1996) Line
- On Air (1997) Strange Fruit (original BBC album + 2 extra tracks)
- New Place Now (1999) Blue Rose (Germany) / Spin Along (UK) / Tangible (US)
- Live In Austria (1999) Plainsong (4-track mini-CD, live in Thalgäu)
- A To B (2001) Spin Along (6-track mini-CD)
- In Search Of Amelia Earhart (CD 2001) Perfect Pitch
- Pangolins (2003) Blue Rose
- Plainsong (2005) 2CD Water Records (remaster of In Search Of Amelia Earhart, unreleased second album Now We Are 3, plus radio sessions, live recordings and singles)
- Fat Lady Singing (2012) Blue Rose
- Reinventing Richard: The Songs of Richard Farina (2015) Fledg'ling
- In Search Of Amelia Earhart (CD re-issue 2016) Man In The Moon

== See also ==
- Liverpool poets
- The Scaffold
- The Liverpool Scene
- Plainsong
