= Second Spring =

Studio album by Matthews Southern Comfort
- Released: July 1970
- Recorded: 1970
- Genre: Folk rock, country rock
- Length: 38:19
- Label: Vinyl: Uni (Europe), Decca (US) CD: Line / BGO
- Producer: Ian Matthews

Matthews Southern Comfort chronology
| Matthews' Southern Comfort (1970) | Second Spring (1970) | Later That Same Year (1970) |

Professional ratings
Review scores
| Source | Rating |
|---|---|
| AllMusic | 3/5 stars |
| Christgau's Record Guide | C |

Second Spring is the first album by country rock/folk rock musician Ian Matthews' band Matthews Southern Comfort, released on the Uni label in July 1970. It was Matthews' second album after his departure from Fairport Convention and was recorded with the touring band he put together following the release of his first solo LP, Matthews' Southern Comfort.

The original vinyl album was reissued on CD by Line Records in Germany in 1993, and a remastered version was released by BGO Records in 1996 as part of a 2-on-1 release with Matthews' Southern Comfort.

== Track listing ==
1. "Ballad of Obray Ramsey" (Ian Matthews) – 2:25
2. "Moses in the Sunshine" (Carl Barnwell) – 6:18
3. "Jinkson Johnson" (Ian Matthews) – 5:29
4. "Tale of the Trial" (Ian Matthews) – 2:42
5. "Blood Red Roses" (Ian Matthews) – 2:27
6. "Even As" (Carl Barnwell) – 2:49
7. "Darcy Farrow" (Tom Campbell, Steve Gillette) – 3:34
8. "Something in the Way She Moves" (James Taylor) – 4:48
9. "Southern Comfort" (Sylvia Tyson) – 7:47

== Personnel ==
- Ian Matthews – guitar, lead vocals, arranger
- Carl Barnwell – guitar, harmony vocals, lead vocal on "Even As"
- Mark Griffiths – lead guitar, harmony vocals
- Andy Leigh – bass, harmony vocals
- Gordon Huntley – steel guitar
- Ray Duffy – drums

Guest Musicians

- Tom Paley – banjo
- Martin Jenkins – mandolin
- Roger Churchyard – violin, fiddle
- Byard Ray – fiddle

Production

- Production: Ian Matthews and Southern Comfort
- Production Coordinator: Steve Barlby
- Recording Engineers: Robin Black at Morgan Studios, London on tracks 1, 2, 4, 5, 6 and 9; John Wood at Sound Techniques Studios, London, on tracks 3, 7 and 8.
- Art Direction: Paul Whitehead
- Cover Design: Ian Matthews
- Photography: Ray Stevenson
