= Fred Noonan =

American aviator and navigator (1893–1937)

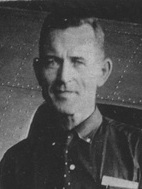
- Born: Frederick Joseph Noonan; April 4, 1893; Cook County, Illinois, U.S.
- Disappeared: July 2, 1937: Pacific Ocean; en route to Howland Island from Lae, New Guinea
- Status: Declared dead in absentia June 20, 1938 (aged 45)
- Occupations: Sea captain, flight navigator
- Spouses: Josephine Sullivan (m. 1927; div. 1937) Mary Beatrice Martinelli (née Passadori) (m. 1937)

Frederick Joseph Noonan (born April 4, 1893 – disappeared July 2, 1937, declared dead June 20, 1938) was an American flight navigator, sea captain and aviation pioneer, who first charted many commercial airline routes across the Pacific Ocean during the 1930s. As the flight navigator for famed aviator Amelia Earhart in their pioneering attempt at circumnavigating the globe, the two disappeared somewhere over the central Pacific Ocean on July 3, 1937.

== Early life ==
Fred Noonan was born on April 4, 1893, in Cook County, Illinois, to Joseph T. Noonan (born Lincolnville, Maine, in 1861) and Catherine Egan (born London, United Kingdom), both of Irish descent. Noonan's mother died when he was four, and three years later the 1900 census report listed his father as living alone in a Chicago boarding house. Relatives or family friends were likely looking after Noonan. In his own words, Noonan "left school in summer of 1905 and went to Seattle, Washington," where he was a seaman at an early age, serving in a succession of merchant ships and steadily advancing in his ratings and certifications.

== Maritime career ==
At the age of 17, Noonan shipped out of Seattle as an ordinary seaman on a British sailing bark, the Crompton. Between 1910 and 1915, Noonan worked on over a dozen ships, rising to the ratings of quartermaster and bosun's mate. During World War I, Noonan lived in New York and served aboard several American and British ships in the merchant marine, though he was never in the U.S. Navy. He continued working on merchant ships throughout the war. Serving as an officer on ammunition ships, his harrowing wartime service included being on three vessels that were sunk from under him by U-boats. After the war, Noonan continued in the Merchant Marine and achieved a measure of prominence as a ship's officer. In 1926, the U.S. Shipping Board awarded Noonan his license as "master of steamers of any gross tonnage." His maritime career was characterized by steadily increasing ratings and "good" (typically the highest) work performance reviews. His career moving ahead, the 34-year-old Noonan married Josephine Sullivan in 1927 in Jackson, Mississippi. After a honeymoon in Cuba, they settled in New Orleans, where Noonan worked for the Mississippi Shipping Company as chief mate on the SS Carplaka, a Design 1022 ship.

== Navigator for Pan Am ==
Following a distinguished 22-year career at sea, which included sailing around Cape Horn seven times (three times under sail), Noonan contemplated a new career direction. After learning to fly in the late 1920s, he received a "limited commercial pilot's license" in 1930, on which he listed his occupation as "aviator." In the following year, he was awarded marine license #121190, "Class Master, any ocean," the qualifications of a merchant ship's captain. During the early 1930s, he worked for Pan American World Airways as a navigation instructor in Miami and an airport manager in Port-au-Prince, Haiti, eventually assuming the duties of inspector for all of the company's airports. Adapting his maritime navigational expertise to aviation, Noonan was instrumental in developing techniques for the company's nascent Pacific Division.

In March 1935, Noonan and his wife moved to Oakland, California, and for the rest of that year, Noonan served as navigating officer on the survey flights that pioneered commercial air service across the Pacific. He was the navigator on the first Pan Am Sikorsky S-42 clipper at San Francisco Bay. In April, he navigated the historic round-trip China Clipper flight between San Francisco and Honolulu, piloted by Ed Musick (who was featured on the cover of Time magazine that year), its course set by Noonan. Noonan was subsequently responsible for mapping Pan Am's clipper routes across the Pacific Ocean, participating in many flights to Midway Island, Wake Island, Guam, the Philippines, and Hong Kong. He made at least 21 flights for Pan American in 1936, including numerous, often lengthy, test hops and five round-trip Pacific crossings to Manila. His last flight with the airline – a 16-day marathon as navigator of the "Philippine Clipper" – concluded on December 7, 1936. Sometime later that month, he left the company. In a 1939 book by Pan Am pilot William Grooch, who reported something of a rebellion among the airline's flight crews following the trip, Noonan said, "We've lived on promises for a year. I'm through." and resigned immediately.

1937 was a year of transition for Noonan, whose reputation as an expert navigator, along with his role in the development of commercial airline navigation, had already earned him a place in aviation history. The tall, very thin, dark auburn-haired and blue-eyed 43-year-old held maritime ratings and a pilot's license and was also a celebrated aerial navigator living in Los Angeles. He resigned from Pan Am because he felt he had risen through the ranks as far as he could as a navigator, and he had an interest in starting a navigation school. References in his own correspondence make it clear that Noonan enjoyed an occasional drink, and it is possible that he sometimes overindulged, but there is no contemporary evidence Noonan was an alcoholic or was fired by Pan American for drinking, although decades later, a few writers and others made some hearsay claims that he was. On March 3, Noonan's attorney filed divorce papers for his wife Josephine in Ciudad Juárez, Mexico. Around this time, Noonan was also involved in a serious automobile accident.

== Earhart world flight and disappearance ==
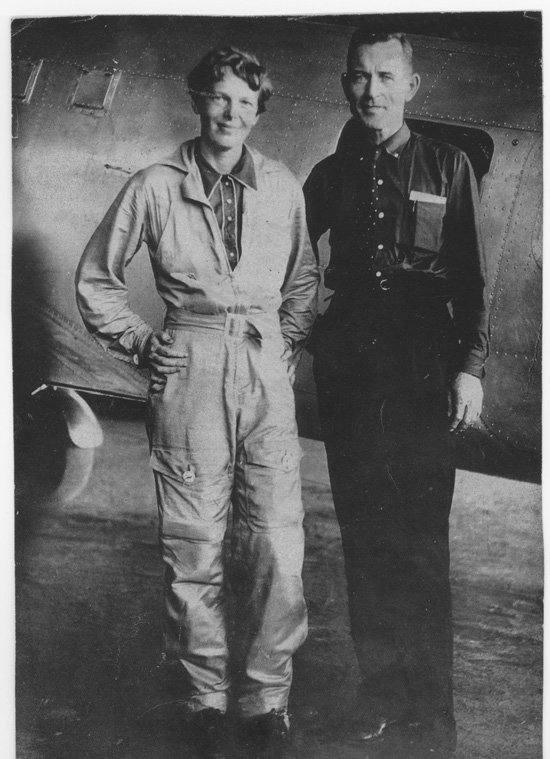
Fred Noonan with Amelia Earhart

Amelia Earhart met Noonan through mutual connections in the Los Angeles aviation community and chose him to serve as her navigator on her World Flight in the Lockheed Electra 10E that she had purchased with funds donated by Purdue University. She planned to circumnavigate the globe at equatorial latitudes. Although this aircraft was of an advanced type for its time, and was dubbed a "flying laboratory" by the press, little real science was planned. The world was already crisscrossed by commercial airline routes (many of which Noonan himself had first navigated and mapped), and the flight is now regarded by some as an adventurous publicity stunt for Earhart's gathering public attention for her next book. Noonan had recently left Pan American Airways and was available to help out. Noonan was probably attracted to this project because Earhart's mass market fame would almost certainly generate considerable publicity, which in turn might reasonably be expected to attract attention to him and the navigation school that he hoped to establish when they returned. Noonan's addition to the Electra's crew just days before the departure of the first world flight attempt appears to have been occasioned by the discovery that the flight's designated navigator Captain Harry Manning needed help. Noonan did not have the necessary visa to accompany the flight as far as New Guinea, but his skills in aeronautical-celestial and dead-reckoning navigation were most needed for the flight from Hawaii to Howland Island, a tiny sliver of land in the Pacific Ocean, barely 2,000 metres (1.2 mi) long. Noonan would leave the flight at Howland and return to Honolulu aboard the U.S. Coast Guard cutter Shoshone. This plan appears to have been altered after the plane reached Hawaii.

On March 13, 1937, Noonan's name appeared for the first time in the press as a member of Earhart's crew. On March 16, the first attempt was delayed due to weather conditions, and Noonan, having had a chance to assess the plane's navigational equipment, had identified a major deficiency in the flight's preparations. As described in a Time magazine article later that summer, Noonan was "dismayed to discover that there was nothing with which to take celestial bearings except an ordinary ship sextant. He remedied that by borrowing a modern bubble octant designed especially for airplane navigation." Modern bubble octants were expensive, and Noonan apparently did not own one himself. It is equally apparent that he was unwilling or unable to borrow one from his former employer, even though Pan American had a major terminal in Alameda. The octant was safely aboard when the flight began on March 17 with a record-breaking flight from Burbank, California, to Honolulu. On March 19, Noonan sent a telegram to Mary: "Leaving 1:30 AM your time. Amelia has asked me to continue with her at least as far as Darwin, Australia and possibly around before I can return from Australia. I love you, Fred." The next day, while the Electra was taking off to begin its second leg to Howland Island, its wing clipped the ground. Earhart cut an engine off to maintain balance, the aircraft ground looped, and its landing gear collapsed. Although there were no injuries, the Lockheed Electra had to be shipped back to Los Angeles by sea for expensive repairs. One week later, on March 27, Fred and Mary were married in Yuma, Arizona. According to newspaper accounts, the couple planned to settle in Oakland but would "spend a brief honeymoon in Hollywood as Noonan is now engaged with Miss Earhart in preparing plans for the re-start of the world flight." On April 4, Noonan's 44th birthday, as he and his bride drove through Fresno on their way back to Oakland along the Golden State Highway, they hit another car head-on. Fred escaped with minor bruises, while Mary was hospitalized with "an extensive laceration on the knee and other injuries." The other driver was not injured, but the man's wife and infant daughter were treated for bruises and released. Noonan was cited for driving in the wrong lane. Noonan maintained a post office box address in Hollywood, and a business directory published later that year lists a residence address in Los Angeles. After the Electra was certified on May 19, Noonan was on hand in Burbank the next day for the "sneak takeoff" of the second world flight attempt. Three days later, Earhart and Noonan arrived in Florida, having completed the Electra's cross-country test flight. In Miami, Noonan took the opportunity to renew his acquaintance with Helen Day, a young woman he had met when he worked for Pan American's Caribbean Division. He wrote to Day at least four times during the world flight.

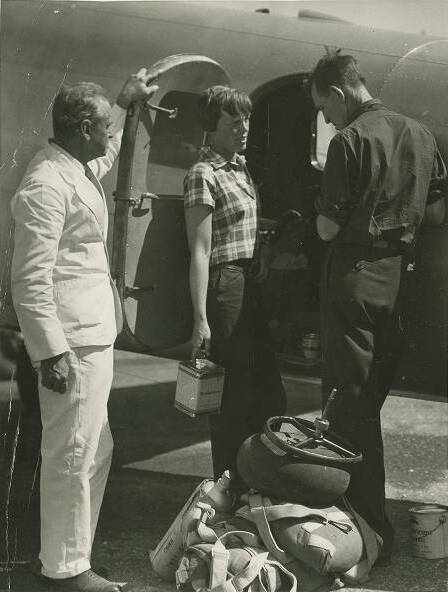
Noonan and Earhart prepare for the flight to Lae at Port Darwin, Australia on June 28, 1937

Over one month later, Earhart and Noonan began the second world flight attempt, this time leaving California in the opposite (eastward) direction. When Earhart made the announcement on May 30, she said she had originally "planned to be alone except for a navigator on the Pacific, where objectives were small islands on a vast ocean. Now I am taking Captain Noonan the whole distance to save time on occasion." Earhart characterized the pace of their 40-day, eastward trip from Burbank to New Guinea as "leisurely". As Noonan tracked the Electra's progress southward to San Juan, he and Earhart worked along together for the first time on the trip. Earhart made jotted comments that spoke rather dismissively of "Freddie," as he looked for a lighthouse and pointed out a partly submerged wreck off shore. Nonetheless, a growing admiration appeared in notations such as "6:35. We sight a reef. Freddie said we'd pass one at 6:40. Pretty good." and "Freddie says San Juan at 1:10 EST from white hankies of foam?" (an allusion to Noonan's ability to judge surface wind speed and direction from the appearance of the sea). Earhart's notes written later in the world flight refer to Noonan as "Fred" or "F.N.," never "Freddie". Contrary to belief, Noonan was not confined to the navigator's station in the rear cabin and able to communicate with Earhart only in notes passed forward over the fuel tanks by means of a bamboo pole; he spent much of his time in the cockpit with Earhart, clambering over the fuel tanks into the rear cabin only when he needed room to spread out a chart or use the lavatory, though they did communicate primarily in writing, due to the noise of the engines. After completing about 22,000 miles (35,000 km) of the journey, they took off from Lae on July 2, 1937, and headed for Howland Island. Their plan for the 18-hour-long flight was to reach the vicinity of Howland using Noonan's celestial navigation abilities and then find Howland by using radio signals transmitted by the U.S. Coast Guard cutter USCGC Itasca.

Through a combined sequence of misunderstandings or mishaps (that are still controversial) over scattered clouds, the final approach to Howland Island failed, although Earhart stated by radio that they believed they were in the immediate vicinity of Howland. The strength of the transmissions received indicated that Earhart and Noonan were indeed in the vicinity of Howland island, but could not find it and after numerous more attempts it appeared that the connection had dropped. The last transmission received from Earhart indicated she and Noonan were flying along a line of position (taken from a "sun line" running on 157–337 degrees) which Noonan would have calculated and drawn on a chart as passing through Howland. Two-way radio contact was never established, and the aviators and their aircraft disappeared somewhere over the Central Pacific Ocean. Despite an unprecedented, extensive search by the U.S. Navy—including the use of search aircraft from an aircraft carrier—and the U.S. Coast Guard, no traces of them or their Electra were ever found. (Note: The USS Lexington, a large aircraft carrier, and the USS Colorado, a battleship, the Itasca, and even two Japanese ships searched for seven days, covering 150,000 square miles (390,000 km^{2}) of ocean and the few islets. The official search for them by a variety of vessels lasted until July 18, 1937, a total of 16 days.)

Later research showed that Howland's position was misplaced on their chart by approximately five nautical miles (5.8 mi; 9.3 km). There is also some motion picture evidence to suggest that a belly antenna on their Electra might have snapped on takeoff, which could explain Earhart's inability to receive radio transmissions during the flight. One relatively new theory suggests that Noonan may have made a mistake in navigation due to the flight's crossing of the International Date Line. However, this theory is based entirely on supposition and misunderstanding of astronomy; it does not offer any evidence Noonan was impacted by or failed to adequately account for the 24-hour variance in his sun line calculations, and was reportedly debunked by an experienced navigator on a TIGHAR forum.

=== Theories on disappearance ===
While most historians believe Earhart and Noonan crashed and sank in the Pacific Ocean, a number of other possibilities have been proposed, including several conspiracy theories. The Gardner Island hypothesis supposes Earhart and Noonan were unable to find Howland Island and continued south. Nikumaroro, one of the Phoenix Islands known at the time as Gardner Island, has been the subject of inquiry as a possible crash-landing site but, despite numerous expeditions, no definitive link between Earhart and the island has been found.

The Japanese capture theory proposes Japanese forces captured Earhart and Noonan, possibly after they navigated to the Imperial Japanese South Seas Mandate. A number of Earhart's relatives have been convinced the Japanese were somehow involved in her disappearance, citing unnamed witnesses including Japanese troops and Saipan natives.

The New Britain theory assumes Earhart turned back mid-flight and tried to reach the airfield at Rabaul, New Britain, northeast of mainland Papua New Guinea, approximately 2,200 miles (3,500 km) from Howland Island. In 1990, Donald Angwin, a veteran of the Australian Army's World War II New Britain campaign, reported that, in 1945, he had seen a wrecked aircraft in the jungle that may have been Earhart's Electra. Subsequent searches of the area failed to find any wreckage.

Contradictory research has recently been advanced; it is possible to set course for and see Gardner from a point on the over Howland sunline (passing 7 miles or 11 km east of), but one does not simply reach Gardner by following such a line. A position line is part of a circle circumference and may be considered a straight line only for limited distances. The sun's azimuth change per hour is about 15 arcdegrees, whereas the Howland-to-Gardner flight—409 statute miles (658 km)—would have taken 2 hours 55 minutes at 140 miles per hour (230 km/h). As a result, the aircraft, when having followed the line of position by astronavigation, would have passed far northward of Gardner when reaching its meridian. The Gardner Island hypothesis originates from a 1980s book (Note: The Earhart Travesty: 75 Years of U.S. Government Deceit in the Disappearance of Amelia Earhart by Mike Campbell) where navigator Paul Rafford Jr. (Note: Paul Rafford Jr. was a navigator-radio operator for Pan American World Airways in the 1940s.) "fell off his chair when seeing that the position line points in the direction of Gardner Island". Apart from such supposition, with the available fuel reserves of 45 US gallons (170 L), it would not have been possible to reach Gardner from the Howland region, as the route would have taken at least 120 US gallons (450 L).

The author of an article in the European Journal of Navigation, Vol. 9, No. 3, December 2011, avers that due to insufficient fuel reserves from 1912 GMT, no land other than Howland itself and Baker Island at 45 miles (72 km) could be reached. With a maximum ferry range of 2,740 statute miles (4,410 km), even the closest islands of Winslow Reef and McKean Island, at 210 and 350 miles (340 and 560 km) away, respectively, were unreachable.

David W. Jourdan refutes the theory that Earhart and Noonan landed on Gardner Island, claiming that any transmissions attributed to Gardner Island were false.

== In popular culture ==
Although Fred Noonan has left a much smaller mark in popular culture than Amelia Earhart's, his legacy is remembered sporadically. He is often mentioned in W. P. Kinsella's novels.

The character of an aircraft pilot named Fred Noonan is portrayed by actor Eddie Firestone in "The Long Train", a 1961 episode of the television series The Untouchables. In the TV miniseries Amelia Earhart (1976), Noonan was played by Bill Vint. A 1990 episode of Unsolved Mysteries featured Mark Stitham as Noonan. Rutger Hauer portrayed Noonan in the TV movie Amelia Earhart: The Final Flight (1994). Noonan was portrayed by actor David Graf in "The 37's", a 1995 episode of Star Trek: Voyager. Christopher Eccleston portrayed Noonan in the biographical movie Amelia (2009).

The first ballad written about Earhart and Noonan was written and sung by David McEnery c. 1939 called "Amelia Earhart's Last Flight". The controversy over Earhart and Noonan's disappearance was discussed in the song "True Story of Amelia Earhart" on the 1972 album In Search of Amelia Earhart by Plainsong. Noonan is mentioned in the song "Amelia" on Bell X1's 2009 album Blue Lights on the Runway, which contemplates the last moments and the fates of the duo. Antje Duvekot's song "Ballad of Fred Noonan" on her 2012 album New Siberia imagines Noonan's unrequited and unremembered love for Earhart. Noonan and Earhart's fate is also considered in the song "Amelia" by Mark Kelly's Marathon, the opening single from the 2020 eponymous album by Mark Kelly from the band Marillion.

Noonan is a main character in Jane Mendelsohn's novel, I Was Amelia Earhart (1996), and in Neal Bowers' poem "The Noonan Variations".

== See also ==
- Air navigation
- List of people who disappeared mysteriously at sea
