= Later That Same Year =

Studio album by Matthews Southern Comfort
- Released: November 1970
- Recorded: 1970
- Studio: Morgan Studios, London, England
- Genre: Folk rock, country rock, soft rock
- Length: 41:05
- Label: Vinyl – Uni/MCA/Decca/Pickwick; CD – BGO
- Producer: Ian Matthews

Matthews Southern Comfort chronology
Second Spring (1970)	Later That Same Year (1970)

Professional ratings
Review scores
Source	Rating
AllMusic	3.5/5 stars
Christgau's Record Guide	B−

Later That Same Year is the second album by country rock/folk rock musician Ian Matthews' band, Matthews Southern Comfort. This was Matthews' third album overall after his departure from Fairport Convention in 1969 and was released in November 1970, shortly after the band's single "Woodstock" had reached number one on the UK Singles Chart. For the US release in spring 1971, "Jonah" was left off the album and was replaced with "Woodstock" which became the lead track. In Canada, the album reached number 52.

== Track listings ==
=== UK version on Uni (released 1970) ===
1. "To Love" (Gerry Goffin, Carole King) – 4:42
2. "And Me" (Ian Matthews) – 4:39
3. "Tell Me Why" (Neil Young) – 2:04
4. "Jonah" (Carl Barnwell) – 4:14
5. "My Lady" (Ian Matthews) – 1:38
6. "And When She Smiles (She Makes The Sun Shine)" (Alan Anderson) – 2:13
7. "Mare, Take Me Home" (Alan Anderson) – 3:43
8. "Sylvie" (Carl Barnwell) – 5:41
9. "The Brand New Tennessee Waltz" (Jesse Winchester) – 3:00
10. "For Melanie" (Carl Barnwell) – 6:40
11. "Road to Ronderlin" (Ian Matthews) – 2:19

=== US version on Decca (released 1971) ===
1. "Woodstock" (Joni Mitchell) – 4:26
2. "To Love" (Gerry Goffin, Carole King) – 4:42
3. "And Me" (Ian Matthews) – 4:39
4. "Tell Me Why" (Neil Young) – 2:04
5. "My Lady" (Ian Matthews) – 1:38
6. "And When She Smiles (She Makes The Sun Shine)" (Alan Anderson) – 2:13
7. "Mare, Take Me Home" (Alan Anderson) – 3:43
8. "Sylvie" (Carl Barnwell) – 5:41
9. "The Brand New Tennessee Waltz" (Jesse Winchester) – 3:00
10. "For Melanie" (Carl Barnwell) – 6:40
11. "Road to Ronderlin" (Ian Matthews) – 2:19

=== Canadian reissue on Pickwick (released 1979) ===
Side 1

1. "Woodstock" (Joni Mitchell) – 4:26
2. "To Love" (Gerry Goffin, Carole King) – 4:35
3. "And When She Smiles (She Makes The Sun Shine)" (Alan Gordon Anderson) – 2:09
4. "Tell Me Why" (Neil Young) – 2:03
5. "My Lady" (Ian Matthews) – 1:35

Side 2

1. "And Me" (Ian Matthews) – 4:36
2. "Mare, Take Me Home" (Alan Gordon Anderson) – 3:38
3. "The Brand New Tennessee Waltz" (Jesse James Winchester) – 2:57
4. "Road to Ronderlin" (Ian Matthews) – 2:18

=== Reissue on BGO (released 2008) ===
Later That Same Year was remastered and reissued in 2008 by BGO Records, with extensive new liner notes by David Wells. In addition to the original UK track listing, the reissue included 4 bonus tracks: "Woodstock", "The Struggle", "Parting" and "Scion". "Woodstock", the band's cover of the Joni Mitchell song, had been a UK Number 1 single in October 1970 backed by "Scion"; "The Struggle" was the B-side of the single "Colorado Springs Eternal" taken from the first album, Matthews' Southern Comfort. "Parting" was the B-side of the "Ballad Of Obray Ramsay" single.

== Personnel ==
- Ian Matthews – guitar, vocals
- Carl Barnwell – guitar
- Gordon Huntley – steel guitar
- Keith Nelson – banjo
- Mark Griffiths – bass
- Andy Leigh – bass
- Roger Coulam – piano
- Ray Duffy – drums
- Tristan Fry – vibraphone
- Tim Kraemer – arrangement

== Production ==
- Producer: Ian Matthews
- Recording Engineer: Robin Black
- Art Direction: unknown
- Photography: unknown
- Liner notes: unknown
