= Harsh Reality =

English proto-prog band

- Origin: Stevenage, Hertfordshire, England
- Genres: Progressive rock
- Years active: 1968–1969
- Label: Philips Records
- Members: Mark Griffiths; Dave Jenkins; Alan Greed; Roger Swallow; Steve Miller

Harsh Reality are a little-known, proto-prog band formed in Stevenage, Hertfordshire, England, in 1968 out of the remnants of the Freightliner Blues Band (formerly the Revolution). The band consisted of Mark Griffiths and Dave Jenkins on guitars, Alan Greed on lead vocals and organ, Roger Swallow on drums, and Steve Miller on bass and backing vocals. They released a single for Philips Records in 1968 ("Tobacco Ash Sunday" / "How Do You Feel") before releasing their only album, Heaven and Hell, also on Philips in 1969. A final single followed soon after, before the band split in 1969.

Their Heaven and Hell LP is now widely considered rare, selling for hundreds of pounds.

Though seen as part of the proto-progressive rock era, their work represented a marriage between the sounds of Procol Harum, Traffic and early Deep Purple.

Following the band's demise, Roger Swallow played with Principal Edwards Magic Theatre, Matthews Southern Comfort, Plainsong, Albion Country Band, and Al Stewart; before moving to California and establishing himself as an electronic musician, songwriter and entrepreneur. Alan Greed went on to work with Ray Russell on the Rock Workshop albums, and as a session singer. Greed later fronted the jazz/progressive outfit, The Running Man. A self-titled album was released in the UK on the Neon record label in 1972.

Mark Griffiths has worked with Matthews Southern Comfort, Jonathan Kelly, Al Stewart, David Essex, The Everly Brothers, and Cliff Richard & The Shadows. The rest of the band also went into session work.

The song "Tobacco Ash Sunday" was covered by Paul Weller for AOL Sessions.

Heaven and Hell was reissued for the first time on CD by Esoteric Recordings on 26 September 2011, with four bonus tracks and a 16-page booklet containing a lengthy interview with the band.

== Discography ==
- "Tobacco Ash Sunday" b/w "How Do You Feel" (October 1968)
- "Heaven And Hell " b/w "Praying For Reprieve " (May 1969)
- Heaven And Hell (Philips SBL 7891, 1969; official CD reissue: Esoteric, 2011)
