= Matthews' Southern Comfort (album) =

Studio album by Ian Matthews
- Released: January 1970
- Recorded: 1969
- Genre: Folk rock, country rock
- Length: 38:19
- Label: Vinyl: Uni (UK/Europe) and Decca (US). CD: Line and BGO
- Producer: Steve Barlby, Ian Matthews

Ian Matthews chronology
Matthews' Southern Comfort (1970)	Second Spring (1970)

Professional ratings
Review scores
Source	Rating
AllMusic	4/5 stars
Christgau's Record Guide	C+

Matthews' Southern Comfort is the 1970 debut solo album by country rock/folk rock musician Ian Matthews, recorded after he left Fairport Convention in 1969. The musicians who played on it with Matthews were luminaries of the British folk rock scene and included ex-Fairport colleagues Ashley Hutchings, Simon Nicol and Richard Thompson, plus Gerry Conway, the drummer from Eclection and Fotheringay.

The touring and recording band also named Matthews Southern Comfort, which released two more albums, Second Spring and Later That Same Year, was formed later, with only pedal steel player Gordon Huntley and Matthews appearing on all three albums. The Matthews' Southern Comfort album was released on the Uni label (a subsidiary of MCA Records) in January 1970 with a first single "Colorado Springs Eternal". It derived its name from a song, "Southern Comfort", written by Sylvia Fricker of the Canadian folk duo Ian & Sylvia, which appeared as the final track on Second Spring.

The original vinyl album was reissued on CD by Line Records in Germany in 1993 and a remastered version was issued by BGO records in 1996, not in its original form but as a 2-on-1 remaster with Second Spring.

== Track listing ==
1. "Colorado Springs Eternal" (Steve Barlby) - 3:13
2. "A Commercial Proposition" (Richard Thompson) - 3:01
3. "The Castle Far" (Steve Barlby) - 2:59
4. "Please Be My Friend" (Ian Matthews) - 3:23
5. "What We Say" (Ian Matthews) - 3:26
6. "Dream Song" (Ian Matthews) - 2:13
7. "Fly Pigeon Fly" (Steve Barlby, Hamwood a.k.a. Albert Hammond and Mike Hazlewood) - 3:22
8. "The Watch" (Ian Matthews, Steve Barlby, Frances Conford) - 2:41
9. "Sweet Bread" (Steve Barlby) - 2:34
10. "Thoughts for a Friend" (Ian Matthews) - 3:19
11. "I've Lost You" (Steve Barlby) - 2:28
12. "Once Upon a Lifetime" (Ian Matthews, Steve Barlby) - 4:27

== Personnel ==
- Ian Matthews - guitar, vocals
- Gerry Conway - drums, congas, tambourine
- Richard Thompson - guitars
- Gordon Huntley - pedal steel guitar
- Simon Nicol - guitar
- Ashley Hutchings - bass
- Marc Ellington - finger cymbals
- Roger Coulam - piano, Hammond organ
- Poli Palmer - flute
- Dolly Collins - flute organ (3)
- Pete Willsher - fuzz steel guitar (1)

Production

- Produced by Steve Barlby and Ian Matthews
- Recording Engineer: Barry Ainsworth at De Lane Lea studios.

The liner notes by John Tobler for the 1996 BGO reissue revealed 'Steve Barlby' to be a pseudonym for Ken Howard and Alan Blaikley, a successful song-writing partnership in the pop music industry and Matthews' managers at the time.
