= Matthews Southern Comfort =

British country rock band formed in 1970

- Origin: England
- Genres: Country rock; folk rock
- Years active: 1970; 1970–1972 (as Southern Comfort); 2010–2012; 2017–present
- Members: Iain Matthews; BJ Baartmans; Eric Devries; Bart de Win
- Past members: Mark Griffiths; Carl Barnwell; Gordon Huntley; Pete Watkins; Roger Swallow; Andy Leigh; Ray Duffy; Terri Binion; Richard Kennedy; Mike Roelofs; Elly Kellner

Matthews Southern Comfort (MSC) is a British country rock/folk rock band, formed in 1970 by former Fairport Convention singer Ian (later Iain) Matthews. The original line-up consisted of Matthews, lead guitarist Mark Griffiths (who later became the bass player with the Shadows and the Everly Brothers), rhythm guitarist Carl Barnwell, bass player Pete Watkins, drummer Roger Swallow and pedal steel guitarist Gordon Huntley. Watkins and Swallow left the band after a few weeks and were replaced by bass player Andy Leigh and drummer Ray Duffy.

The band was formed to enable Matthews to tour following the success of his first post-Fairport album, released in early 1970, Matthews' Southern Comfort. The band recorded two more albums that year, Second Spring and Later That Same Year, before Matthews abruptly quit at the height of their fame, shortly after their version of Joni Mitchell's song "Woodstock" became a worldwide hit. It reached the top of the UK music charts in October 1970, their only No. 1 hit single, and charted in several European countries, as well as reaching No. 5 in Canada and No. 23 in the Billboard Top 100 in the United States. A second single, "Mare, Take Me Home", reached #86 in Canada. Three more albums were released by the band under the name Southern Comfort in the early 1970s.

In the twenty-first century, Matthews has twice reformed the band with mostly Dutch musicians, first in 2010, releasing two new albums, Kind Of New and Kind Of Live (individually and as a combined tour issue), and again in 2017, releasing two further albums, Like A Radio in 2018 and The New Mine in 2020. A fifth MSC album, The Woodstock Album featuring 15 cover versions of songs played by various artists at the 1969 Woodstock Festival, was released in April 2023.

== Matthews Southern Comfort: The original band (1970) ==
=== Debut album ===
Matthews had been a member of Fairport Convention between 1967 and 1969 and sang vocals on the band's first two albums, alongside Judy Dyble on the self-titled Fairport Convention, and with Sandy Denny on the acclaimed What We Did on Our Holidays after she had replaced Dyble as lead female singer in 1968.

By the time they recorded their third album Unhalfbricking in early 1969, Fairport, under Denny's influence, had largely abandoned their original American singer-songwriter material and were moving towards what would become known as English folk rock. The genre was somewhat alien to Matthews' tastes, and led to a discontent within Fairport that ended with Matthews leaving the band after a meeting with producer Joe Boyd in February 1969. Matthews continued to live in a shared house in London with Fairport members Richard Thompson and Simon Nicol and was paid a £20 per week retainer while he found his new path. In Fairport Matthews had not played any instruments except the odd conga drum or Jew's harp, and to counter this 'deficiency' he set about learning to play the guitar, with Richard Thompson as his teacher. He was still living with Thompson and Nicol at the time of the motorway crash in May 1969 that killed Fairport drummer Martin Lamble and Thompson's then girlfriend, Jeannie Franklyn.

During the summer of 1969, after discussions with DJ John Peel, who had always championed Fairport's music, Matthews decided to follow the singer-songwriter path and recorded his debut solo album, Matthews’ Southern Comfort, at De Lane Lea Studios in London in November 1969. The other musicians who played on the album were stalwarts of the British folk rock scene and included ex-Fairport colleagues Ashley Hutchings, Simon Nicol and Richard Thompson, plus Gerry Conway, the drummer of folk rock band Fotheringay in which Sandy Denny was now the vocalist. Thompson was the original producer of the album; Matthews later took over the role.

The album was released in January 1970 on the Uni record label (a subsidiary of MCA Records) under the title Matthews’ Southern Comfort. Matthews Southern Comfort (without the apostrophe) was not a band at that stage and Matthews was not ready to go solo, so the name was an attempt to encompass an album title and the collective of musicians who had recorded it. As Matthews told author Ian Clayton in an interview for their co-written 2018 book Thro’ My Eyes: A Memoir, "it got me out of the dilemma of not wanting to go solo and it sounded like a band name". The album took its name from a song that Matthews liked, "Southern Comfort" by Canadian folk duo Ian & Sylvia.

Most of the songs on the album were written by Matthews and his new managers Ken Howard and Alan Blaikley (under the assumed name Steve Barlby), who had previously written hit songs for the likes of The Honeycombs and Dave Dee, Dozy, Beaky, Mick and Tich. The ‘first’ MSC album was essentially an Ian Matthews solo album. The touring and recording band Matthews Southern Comfort, which later released two more albums, Second Spring and Later That Same Year, was not formed until later, with only pedal steel player Gordon Huntley and Matthews appearing on all three albums.

=== Matthews Southern Comfort: The band ===
Matthews was a friend of musician Marc Ellington, who had guested as supporting vocalist on Fairport's 1969 album Unhalfbricking and provided percussion on the 1969 Matthews’ Southern Comfort album. In early 1970, at Ellington's suggestion, Matthews went to see a group called Harsh Reality who were about to be dropped by their record label, Philips, and the band's lead guitarist Mark Griffiths, rhythm guitarist Carl Barnwell and drummer Roger Swallow became the core of the new Matthews Southern Comfort band, together with session player Gordon Huntley who had played pedal steel on the Matthews’ Southern Comfort album. A young bass player, Pete Watkins, completed the first line-up, but soon realised that his studies were going to be affected and dropped out, to be replaced by Andy Leigh who had just left Spooky Tooth. Roger Swallow also left and was replaced by drummer Ray Duffy, late of Marmalade, the best of the half dozen drummers who auditioned to be Swallow's replacement.

This was the band that became the final version of Matthews Southern Comfort and recorded the follow-up albums Second Spring and Later That Same Year. Their style of three-part harmonies mixed with country rock appealed to English music fans at the time and they toured the UK extensively, beginning in February 1970 with a gig at the Mothers club in Birmingham, a triple-header bill alongside Fairport Convention and Fotheringay. A live performance of the band playing at a festival in Maidstone, Kent in 1970, again alongside Fairport Convention, was captured in a Tony Palmer film narrated by John Peel and released on DVD in 2007. It was also released as a CD soundtrack in 2009.

MSC also recorded nine radio sessions for the BBC, the best of which were eventually released on the 1994 album Scion. These radio sessions were aired regularly on the BBC during 1970 on programmes such as 'Folk On One' and 'Top Gear'. The recordings also appeared on eight editions of a series of BBC Transcription Services discs called Various – Pick Of The Pops For Your D.J.. These discs at the time were usually only made available to overseas radio stations for broadcast purposes and were not made available for sale to the general public.

=== "Woodstock" ===
Their albums were popular, but it was the band's version of Joni Mitchell's "Woodstock" that propelled Matthews Southern Comfort to fame. Mitchell wrote "Woodstock" about the music festival held in upstate New York in August 1969, an event widely regarded as a pivotal moment in the history of popular music. Hers was one of three versions of the song released in 1970. It was included on her March 1970 album Ladies Of The Canyon and was the B-side of her single release, "Big Yellow Taxi". The second version, also released in March, was by Crosby, Stills, Nash & Young, who had performed at the festival. Their version appeared as a track on their No.1 album Déjà Vu and as a single which reached No.11 in the Billboard Top 100 charts in May 1970. The CSN version became a staple of classic rock radio worldwide and is the best-known version in the United States. The version by Matthews Southern Comfort became the best known version in the UK and was the highest charting version of the song worldwide, reaching the top of the UK music charts in 1970.

On Sunday 4 June 1970, MSC went into the BBC's radio studio in London to record a ‘live’ performance for broadcast. They had three songs ready to record but the BBC wanted four, so the band worked out an impromptu arrangement of "Woodstock", a song that Matthews had particularly liked after hearing Mitchell's Ladies Of The Canyon album. Matthews recalled in 1000 UK #1 Hits by Jon Kutner & Spencer Leigh: "I had bought Joni Mitchell's album and we had to do four songs on a BBC lunchtime show. We worked up an arrangement for “Woodstock” and the response was so good that we put it out as a single. Crosby, Stills & Nash's record had just come out and so we waited to see what happened to that first".

The session was broadcast on the BBC on 28 June with "Woodstock" as the fourth song. There was a big listener response and people wanted to know where they could buy the record, which did not yet exist. Howard and Blaikley wanted the band to record it with a view to putting it on their forthcoming album Later That Same Year, but Matthews wanted to keep the album as he had originally planned it. The song was instead re-recorded and released as a single on the Uni label on 24 July 1970, backed by a Matthews composition, "Scion".

The day after its release, on Saturday 25 July 1970, MSC performed "Woodstock" on the British TV programme Disco 2 with DJ Tommy Vance. They performed it again on 13 August on the BBC's Top Of The Pops. Interest in the record was initially slow. It made a cautious entry to the UK charts at No.45, but in September 1970, Radio One DJ Tony Blackburn made "Woodstock" his Record of the Week and sales rocketed. "Woodstock" hit the top of the British charts on 31 October 1970, replacing Freda Payne's "Band of Gold", and stayed there for three weeks before being replaced by Jimi Hendrix's "Voodoo Chile". It was Matthews Southern Comfort's only No.1 record.

"Woodstock" also had widespread success outside the UK, charting in several European countries as well as in South Africa, New Zealand, and Australia. It was released as a single on the Decca label in the United States and Canada, coupled with a track from their Second Spring album, "Ballad of Obray Ramsey", and peaked at No.23 in the Billboard charts on 16 May 1971. The song was also made the lead track on the US and Canadian versions of the Later That Same Year album, replacing the original opening track "Jonah".

Matthews was not happy with chart success and its attendant media coverage and obligations, nor with the spectre of being labelled a country rock band. He became disenchanted with the dominant sound of pedal steel guitar during the tour to promote their third album, Later That Same Year, which had been released on 20 November and his discontent came to a head at the soundcheck for a sell-out gig at Birmingham Town Hall on Friday 27 November. He abruptly quit and returned to London by train, leaving the band to play the gig and another in Manchester the next day without their front man. In Disc and Music Echo, the music weekly, which had hit the news stands the day before, on Thursday 26 November, Matthews had been quoted as saying that he was not denying he was about to leave the band.

The original MSC lasted a year. In an interview published in 1971 in Disc and Music Echo, Matthews said, "In the past year, the group was formed, did two albums, got a number one single and disbanded". The remaining members of the group continued under the shortened name of Southern Comfort, releasing three albums on the Harvest label, while Matthews picked up the threads of his career. In early 1971 he joined forces again with former Fairport colleague Richard Thompson and Andy Roberts and the trio recorded two concert sessions for the BBC and toured the US in the summer. Matthews released his first solo album in his own name, If You Saw Thro' My Eyes, on the Vertigo label, formed Plainsong with Roberts at the end of 1971, recorded the album In Search of Amelia Earhart, released in October 1972; and then went to America in 1973 for a new career, recording numerous solo albums in the following years.

== Matthews Southern Comfort: revival (2010–2012) ==
After 27 years of recording and touring in America, Matthews returned to Europe in 2000. Based in Holland he continued to record and tour, mainly as a solo artist but also with Dutch singer-songwriter Ad Vanderveen as The Iain Ad Venture and with former bandmate Andy Roberts as Plainsong Light.

In 2005, he decided to revive the Matthews Southern Comfort band after touring with Dutch pianist Mike Roelofs and New Zealand guitarist Richard Kennedy, both of whom he thought would be perfect as members of a new MSC. He also co-opted Dutch guitarist and multi-instrumentalist BJ Baartmans and American singer Terri Binion for this project, and 15 new songs were recorded during a 10-day period at a studio in Holland. Plans for an MSC tour were made but Matthews had misgivings about the recordings – something felt "not quite right" – and the planned tour and recordings were shelved.

Five years later, after listening again to the tapes from the recording sessions, Matthews decided that his misgivings had been unfounded and he reassembled the band and resumed work on the recordings. Overdubs, new vocals and drums were added and in 2010, forty years after the original band had broken up, a new Matthews Southern Comfort album, Kind Of New, was released.

Female vocalist Terri Binion, however, now lived in Florida and was unavailable for a European tour to promote the new album. Matthews recruited as her replacement Dutch singer Elly Kellner, whom he had seen performing at a festival gig. The band toured Germany, Holland and the UK in 2011 and also recorded a 7-track live album, Kind Of Live, released in 2011. A combined 2CD version of the two albums was also released in 2012.

== Matthews Southern Comfort: current band (2017–present) ==
In 2015, Matthews again re-formed his 1970s band Plainsong with Andy Roberts, and toured to promote the albums Fat Lady Singing and Reinventing Richard: The Songs Of Richard Fariña. In 2017 he revived the Matthews Southern Comfort band for the third time, the latest line-up consisting of Matthews on vocals and guitar and Dutch musicians BJ Baartmans on electric guitar and mandolin, Eric Devries on vocals and guitar and Bart de Win on keyboards.

The band recorded 15 tracks for a new Matthews Southern Comfort album in the summer of 2017, consisting of 12 all-new Matthews compositions plus three re-worked versions of songs that had been recorded by the original band in 1970. They performed the new material on tour in October of that year and the opening gig of the tour, on 27 October 2017 at Music Star in Norderstedt, Germany was recorded. Two video clips of the band performing old MSC songs, "Road To Ronderlin" and "Darcy Farrow", were released on YouTube to promote the forthcoming album. A live concert recorded on 22 November 2017 at Bergen op Zoom in Holland was broadcast on the Dutch internet radio station, Crossroads Radio. The album Like A Radio was released on the MIG (Made In Germany) label on 23 February 2018 and was toured and promoted across Germany, Holland and the UK during 2018 and 2019.

After a short series of UK gigs in July 2019, the band returned to the studio and recorded a new 12-track album, The New Mine. The album consisted of mostly new material written by Matthews and contained another Joni Mitchell song, "Ethiopia", from her 1985 Dog Eat Dog album. The New Mine was released worldwide on 27 March 2020. A planned eight-date tour of Germany to promote the album had to be postponed because of the coronavirus pandemic. A new digital single, "Hey Superman", written by Matthews about the pandemic with all four musicians recording their parts in isolation, was released on 23 April 2020.

In July 2022, the band began recording a new Matthews Southern Comfort album, The Woodstock Album, at Studio Wild Verband in Boxmeer, the Netherlands. The album featured MSC's interpretation of 15 songs that had been performed by various artists at the Woodstock Festival in August 1969 and was released on the Must Have Music label in April 2023. Prior to the album's physical release on CD, three digital singles from the album, "With a Little Help from My Friends", "I Feel Like I'm Fixing to Die Rag" and "Spinning Wheel", were released via various digital streaming platforms and included two tracks not featured on the CD, "Find the Cost of Freedom" and "To Love Somebody". A 12-track version of the album was also released on vinyl in July 2023.

== Filmography ==
- Tony Palmer's Film of Fairport Convention and Matthews Southern Comfort, directed by Tony Palmer, featuring both bands appearances at the Maidstone Fiesta in 1970.

Originally released as a VHS video by MusicFolk/Weintraub, re-released on DVD by Voiceprint Records in 2007, soundtrack CD issued by Voiceprint as Live in Maidstone 1970 in 2009.

== Discography ==
=== Ian Matthews solo ===
- Matthews' Southern Comfort (1969), UK Uni / US Decca

=== Matthews Southern Comfort ===
- Second Spring (1970), UK Uni / US Decca
- Later That Same Year (1970), UK Uni / US Decca / US reissue Pickwick
- One, Two, Three... Too Good! (1970, German vinyl release), Teldec / MCA (2LP best of compilation)
- The Best of Matthews Southern Comfort (1971, Japanese vinyl release), Victor Co. of Japan / MCA
- Best of Matthews Southern Comfort (1974 vinyl; 1989 CD), MCA Records
- Ian Matthews' Best in Early 70s (1979, Japanese vinyl release), Victor Musical Industries / MCA
- Matthews Southern Comfort Meet Southern Comfort (1987 vinyl compilation), See for Miles
- Scion (1994), UK Band of Joy / US Dutch East India Trading (collection of outtakes and BBC recordings)
- The Essential Collection (1997), Half Moon (retrospective of 1970s recordings)
- Matthews' Southern Comfort / Second Spring (1996), BGO Records
- Later That Same Year (2008 CD), BGO Records (original album remaster + 4 bonus tracks)
- Fairport Convention & Matthews Southern Comfort – Live in Maidstone 1970 (2009), Voiceprint
- Kind of New (2010), Brilliant / Genepool
- Kind of Live (2011), Perfect Pitch
- Kind of New / Kind of Live (2012), 2CD Esoteric / Cherry Red
- Matthews Southern Comfort: A Simple History Vol. 1 (2017), MK2 Records (2017 tour album)
- Like a Radio (2018), MIG
- Bits and Pieces (2018), MIG (4-track EP including an alternative mix of "Woodstock")
- The New Mine (2020), MIG
- The Woodstock Album (2023), Must Have Music

=== Southern Comfort ===
- Frog City (1971), Harvest
- Southern Comfort (1971), Harvest
- Stir Don't Shake (1972), Harvest
