= Justin Long (businessman) =

American businessman and skier

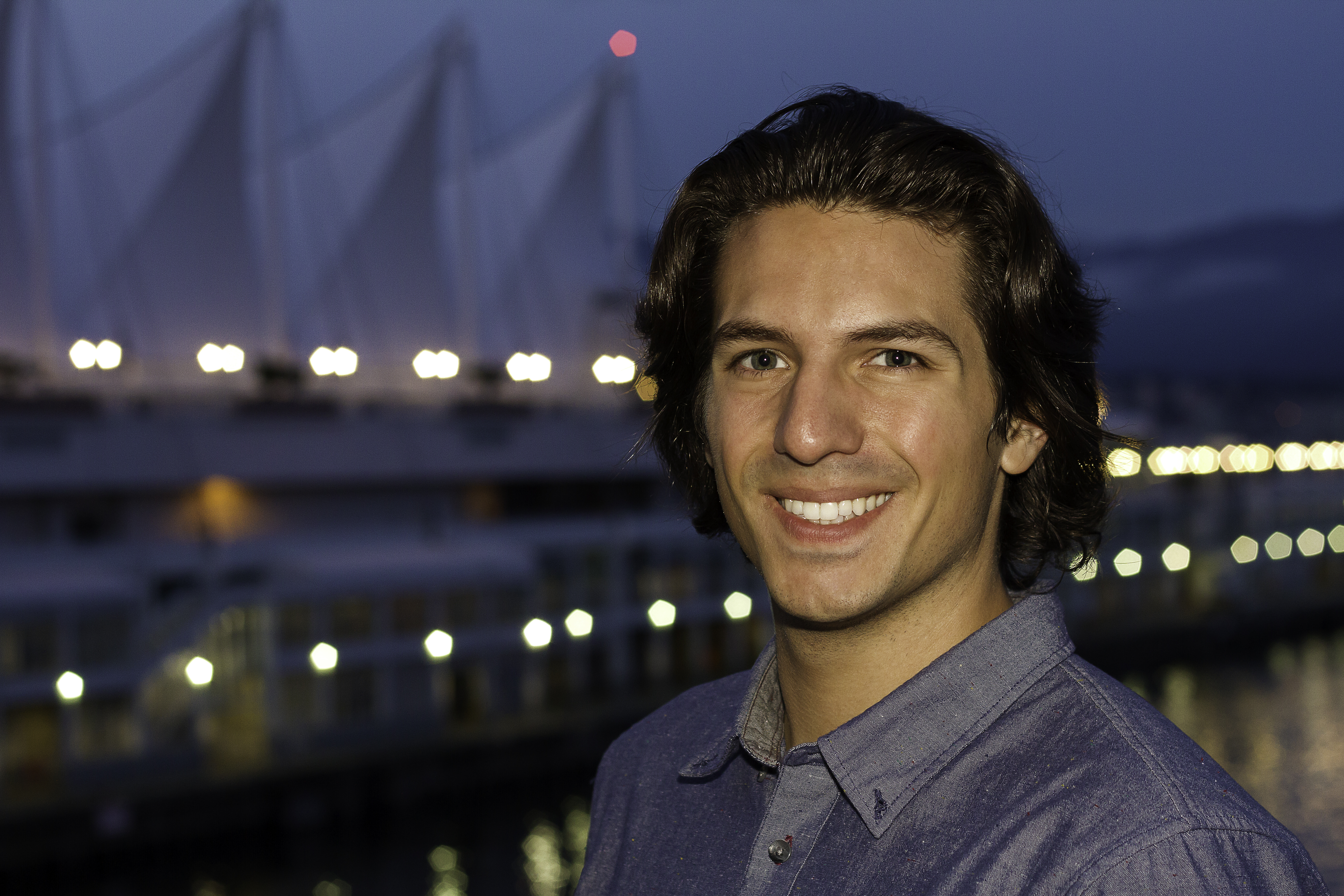
- Long in front of Canada Place in Vancouver, BC.
- Born: Justin Elgen Long; San Diego, California, United States
- Other name: The Dub
- Occupations: Skier, businessman
- Years active: 2006–present

Justin Elgen Long, "The Dub", is an American businessman and skier who currently resides in British Columbia, Canada. He is known for being the youngest person to ski Mount Stanley in Africa as well as for founding the Amelia Earhart DNA Project. Long currently dedicates himself to the technology industry in Vancouver and is the grandson of aviator and author Elgen Long.

== Early life and education ==
Long was born in San Diego and was a resident of the Reno-Lake Tahoe area. He graduated with honors from Galena High School in Reno, Nevada and spent his early years skiing in Lake Tahoe. Long received a degree in Health Sciences and Business from Simon Fraser University.

== Defining work ==
=== The Amelia Earhart DNA Project ===
In February 2011, Long approached Dr. Dongya Yang at Simon Fraser University with letters written by Amelia Earhart. His actions started the Amelia Earhart DNA Project, where Long currently provides support through logistics and funding. The letters were obtained through his grandfather Elgen Long when he realized that the seals on the envelopes were very likely to contain cells left over after Amelia licked them. The Amelia Earhart DNA project will create the first full genetic profile of the disappeared aviator and be used to examine many of the claimed theories of her disappearance.

=== Automation of Tinder Dating App ===
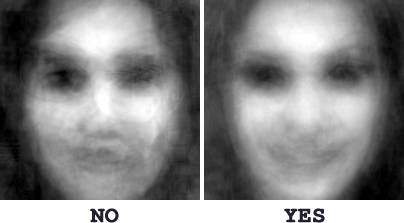
Average faces generated using a modified Eigenfaces algorithm representing yes/no swipes on Tinder.

In early February 2015, an Internet bot that Long developed to intelligently automate the Tinder dating app went viral worldwide. The project, named Tinderbox, was more intelligent than previous attempts to build automated bots on Tinder since it used the Eigenfaces algorithm and machine learning techniques to learn who Long found attractive. Additionally, the bot automated chats to help filter conversations of interest and determine which Tinder matches were truly interested.

=== Snow4Innocents Africa ===
To bring awareness to children's health in southern Uganda in 2010, Long created the Snow4Innocents campaign and became the youngest person to simultaneously climb and ski Mount Stanley, Africa. He was the first skier to use the new southern Rwenzori route from Kilembe trekking over 80 km on foot. Long successfully completed the climb and was acknowledged by figures including the Vice President of Uganda at the opening of Holy Innocents Children's Hospital. In the process he also planted an NHL Canucks flag on the mountain in an idea voted by contestants in an online contest. The campaign was a collaboration between Long and Holy Innocents Children's Hospital and received support from Children's Hospital Oakland, Newschoolers.com, IonEarth, and Oakley.

== Other work ==
From 2007 to January 2011, Long was known as the Executive Director of ACG Corp., a small PR and design agency in Vancouver, British Columbia, Canada. After four years servicing clients internationally, Long sold the agency to Blue Lotus Creative, another Vancouver agency.
