= Elgen Long =

American aviator and author (1927–2022)

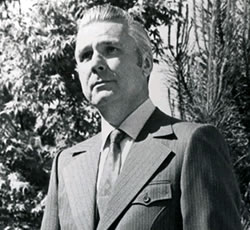
- c. 1972
- Born: August 12, 1927; McMinnville, Oregon, U.S.
- Died: January 26, 2022 (aged 94); Reno, Nevada, U.S.
- Occupations: Aviator, author, and researcher
- Known for: First man to fly solo across both poles, and valid research on Amelia Earhart's disappearance.
- Spouse: Marie K. Long

Elgen Marion Long (August 12, 1927 – January 26, 2022) was an American aviator, author, and researcher who set fifteen aviation records and firsts, including his 1971 flight around the world over both poles. He received the FAI Gold Air Medal for his accomplishment.

He developed the "Crash and Sink" theory explaining the disappearance of Amelia Earhart and Fred Noonan. For over 35 years, Long researched the last leg of Earhart and Noonan's flight in an attempt to determine where their Lockheed Electra may have crashed. He and his wife, Marie Katherine Long, documented the people and data involved in the disappearance, a collection that is held by the SeaWord Foundation.

== Life ==
Long was a Navy veteran who flew in seaplanes throughout the Pacific during World War II. He retired as Senior Boeing 747 Captain from The Flying Tiger Line in 1987. He served over forty years as pilot, examiner, instructor, radio operator, and navigator.

=== Rescue of Yemenite Jews ===
In January 1949, while working as a commercial-flight navigator for Alaska Airlines, Long was instructed to make for a British Royal Air Force base in Aden, located in the then-British Aden Colony. There, his crew took part in rescue mission, Operation Magic Carpet, that would come to be known as “On Eagle’s Wings” - a reference to Exodus 19:4 - that airlifted tens of thousands of Yemenite Jews facing persecution and death out of Yemen and into Israel. The airlift was directed by Alaska Airlines' president, James Wooten.

=== Notable flights ===
In 1971, Long flew solo around the world over both the North and South Poles in a Piper Navajo, setting fifteen world records and firsts. Long was the first man to have crossed Antarctica alone via the South Pole. He was also the first to use inertial navigation in crossing the Antarctic Continent. For those feats, he was awarded the Federation Aeronautique International "Gold Air Medal" as the world's outstanding sports pilot, the Institute of Navigation Superior Achievement Award for outstanding performance as a practicing navigator, and the Airline Pilots Association Award for Outstanding Airmanship.

=== Earhart research ===
Beginning in 1971, Long and his wife, interviewed and collected data from over a hundred surviving individuals that had a direct connection with Amelia Earhart's last flight. Using the data they collected, Long - a former accident investigator for the Airline Pilots Association and member of the International Society of Air Safety Investigators - used his expertise in radio communications, navigation, and aircraft operational performance to collaborate with his wife to write the book, Amelia Earhart: The Mystery Solved, published in 1999, about Earhart's last flight. In 1976, Long was interviewed by the television program, In Search of..., and gave his prognosis on Earhart's fate and the positive condition her aircraft would be in, in the deep sea. Long is the originator and leading proponent of the book's "Crash and Sink" theory explaining Amelia Earhart's disappearance. Long theorised that the Electra ran out of fuel and ditched at sea relatively near to Howland Island, the atoll Earhart was attempting to reach. Movie rights to the book were purchased for Fox Searchlight Studios and Long was hired as technical consultant for the film Amelia (2009).

Long devoted most of his retirement years to researching and writing about Earhart's last flight. He led two expeditions to the mid-Pacific Ocean where Earhart and Noonan disappeared, and in 2006, participated in a search that attempted to locate their downed aircraft on the ocean floor near Howland Island.

== Death ==
Long died in Reno, Nevada, on January 26, 2022, aged 94.

== See also ==
- David W. Jourdan
