= Plainsong (band) =

British country rock/folk rock band

- Origin: England
- Genres: Country rock, Folk rock
- Years active: 1972; 1992–2012; 2014–2017; 2020–2022
- Past members: Iain Matthews; Andy Roberts; David Richards; Bobby Ronga; Mark Griffiths; Julian Dawson; Clive Gregson

Plainsong was originally a British country rock/folk rock band, formed in early 1972 by Iain Matthews, formerly of Fairport Convention and Matthews Southern Comfort, and Andy Roberts, previously a member of The Liverpool Scene and Everyone. Plainsong's line-up consisted of Matthews, Roberts, piano and bass player David Richards (Note: David Latham Richards, born London 7 May 1947; died 16 January 2019. Prior to Plainsong David Richards had played in a band called P.C. Kent who like Plainsong were signed to Sandy Roberton's stable of artists and released an album Upstairs Coming Down on RCA Victor in 1970. He also played bass with Sandy Denny on her Autumn 1971 tour to promote her first solo album The North Star Grassman and the Ravens.) who had played with Roberts in the band Everyone, and American guitarist and bass player Bobby Ronga (Note: Robert R. Ronga, born 23 December 1946, New York; died 12 November 2012. Ronga was originally the driver and tour manager for Matthews' August 1971 US tour but began to play with the band on stage once they realised that he was in fact a fine musician.), who Matthews and Roberts had first met in the summer of 1971 when they toured the US and Canada as an acoustic trio with former Fairport guitarist Richard Thompson.

Managed by record producer Sandy Roberton, Plainsong released just one album during their original existence, In Search of Amelia Earhart in October 1972, before splitting up at the end of December that year in somewhat acrimonious circumstances. A second studio album Now We Are 3 was recorded before the split but remained unreleased until 2005.

Matthews and Roberts have revived Plainsong several times since the early 1990s, firstly as a quartet in 1992 with two new band members: Mark Griffiths, Matthews' former colleague in Matthews Southern Comfort, and British singer-songwriter Julian Dawson, recording a new album Dark Side Of The Room in 1992 and then going out on tour in August 1993 for the first time in 20 years. Two more albums followed - Voices Electric in 1994 and Sister Flute in 1996 - before Clive Gregson replaced Dawson in the band in 1996, touring Europe in 1997 and recording another new album New Place Now in 1999. Dawson rejoined Plainsong in 2003 for their next album Pangolins.

During the 2000s Matthews and Roberts intermittently performed and recorded together as a duo under the Plainsong name (sometimes as 'Plainsong Light') and in 2015 they revived Plainsong as a band once again, this time as a trio with Mark Griffiths, to record an album of Richard Fariña songs. Touring to promote the album began in 2016 and included a performance at the 2017 Cropredy Festival. They also released a live album under their own names in 2021, a performance recorded in Nottingham in 1991.

To celebrate the 50th anniversary of Plainsong’s 1972 debut album, 2022 saw both the release of a book In Search Of Plainsong by Ian Clayton which charts the history of the original 1972 band, and a retrospective 6-CD box set compilation, Following Amelia: The 1972 Recordings & More from Cherry Red Records. A short UK tour by Matthews and Roberts to promote both releases took place in December 2022.

== Original band ==
Ian (later Iain) Matthews had been a member of Fairport Convention between 1967 and 1969, sharing vocals on the band's first two albums, the self-titled Fairport Convention and What We Did On Our Holidays, singing with Judy Dyble initially and then later Sandy Denny. By the time of the recording of band's third album Unhalfbricking, Fairport, under Denny's influence, had largely abandoned their original American singer-songwriter material and were moving towards what would become known as English folk rock. The genre was somewhat alien to Matthews' tastes at the time, leading to a discontent within Fairport that saw him essentially fired from the band after a meeting with producer Joe Boyd in February 1969.

He then left to work solo, soon afterwards forming his own band, Matthews Southern Comfort whose greatest success was topping the UK Singles Chart with their version of Joni Mitchell's "Woodstock" in late October 1970. After that band split up, he recorded two solo albums in 1971 for the Vertigo label, If You Saw Thro' My Eyes and Tigers Will Survive, on both of which Andy Roberts had played guitar.

The beginnings of Plainsong stemmed from Iain Matthews' tour of the US in the summer of 1971 to promote his If You Saw Thro' My Eyes album released at the beginning of May that year. Matthews visited the US in June 1971 to meet with record industry contacts and to promote the album through a series of press conferences for Mercury Records, the distributor of the Vertigo label in America. That trip took in several US cities and laid the groundwork for a return at the end of July as an acoustic trio - joining him on the tour were Andy Roberts and his former colleague Richard Thompson, who by that time had recently left Fairport Convention. The tour would see them play residencies at The Bitter End in New York, the Poison Apple in Detroit and the legendary Troubador nightclub in Los Angeles. Their driver for the tour was New Yorker Bobby Ronga, who also happened to play bass and piano. Ronga was invited by Matthews to join them on bass during their mid-August Bitter End residency, where they were booked as the support act to the singer Dion (DiMucci), who at that time was reinventing himself as a folk singer some ten years after coming to fame with chart hits such as "Runaround Sue" and "Teenager In Love".

Following that tour, Andy Roberts was booked as the support act on an upcoming Steeleye Span tour and needed a bass player. His Everyone bandmate David Richards was his immediate choice but was unavailable as he was already out on tour with Sandy Denny. Roberts had liked Bobby Ronga's bass playing style on that summer tour and invited him to fill the vacant slot. Ronga duly moved to the UK for the tour, and also ended up playing piano alongside Roberts’ guitar work on the recording sessions for Matthews' second Vertigo album Tigers Will Survive.

Throughout that period, Matthews and Roberts frequently discussed the idea of playing together on a more formal basis. It came to fruition in late December 1971 after a meeting at Matthews' Highgate flat, where with Richards and Ronga they tried out the Tandyn Almer song "Along Comes Mary" and agreed that if it worked satisfactorily they would go ahead and form a band. The band's name was picked on a whim when later that evening they randomly opened a copy of The Concise Oxford Dictionary of Music to find Plainsong at pages 450-451.

Plainsong were managed by record producer Sandy Roberton whose music production and artist management company September Productions had signed The Liverpool Scene as their first artists in 1968. Roberton produced four albums in just under two years for The Liverpool Scene, plus Roberts’ 1970 solo album Home Grown and his 1971 Everyone album with Richards, in addition to producing Matthews’ first two solo albums in a three-album deal with Vertigo. He also produced and managed the folk rock band Steeleye Span amongst many others during that era.

After a month of rehearsals at a studio in London called The Cabin, Plainsong began their first UK tour at the end of January 1972, beginning at Leeds University on 29 January 1972 and ending at The Roundhouse in London on 19 March; (Note: A list of Plainsong's upcoming tour dates appeared in Sounds, 8 January 1972) they then embarked on a 10-date tour of Holland on 24 March. (Note: A full list of Plainsong's gigs throughout 1972 can be found as an Appendix in Ian Clayton's book In Search of Plainsong, Route Publishing 2022.) The band signed to Elektra Records and in June and July of that year recorded their debut album, In Search of Amelia Earhart, at the Sound Techniques studio in Chelsea favoured by producer Sandy Roberton for his stable of artists. The album was released on Friday 6 October 1972 and mixed songs by both Matthews and Roberts with several covers, including versions of "Red River Dave" McEnery's song "Amelia Earhart's Last Flight", Paul Siebel's "Louise" and Jerry Yester and Judy Henske's "Raider". The album also included "True Story Of Amelia Earhart's Last Flight", a Matthews song based on research that suggests that Amelia Earhart on her round-the-world flight in 1937 may have been spying on Japanese bases in the Pacific islands, and "Even the Guiding Light", a response to Richard Thompson's song "Meet on the Ledge" on Fairport's What We Did On Our Holidays album.

In Search Of Amelia Earhart was critically well-received on its release - Record Mirror called it "The Contemporary Folk Record of the Year"; and rock journalist Charles Shaar Murray, reviewing the album in New Musical Express, described it as “one of the classic albums of 1972” - but despite the acclaim it did not sell in particularly big numbers and was thus not a commercial success. The group continued to tour throughout the last three months of 1972 (with the addition of drummer Roger Swallow for a short time during October) and recorded a second album at Sound Techniques during December. The album was initially known during the recording sessions by two alternate titles: Plainsong III and Now We Are 3, to reflect the fact that they were by now a trio, Bobby Ronga having been asked to leave the band in November due to a drinking problem. However, relationships between the remaining band members deteriorated considerably towards the end of 1972 and Plainsong broke up at the end of December after Matthews accepted an offer from Elektra Records boss Jac Holzman to move to California to record as a solo artist working with ex-Monkee now turned record producer Michael Nesmith. With the band no longer in existence to promote the album, it remained officially unreleased, though a white-label promo copy by Elektra designated Plainsong III (K42136) did make it into existence, as did a bootleg cassette and then CD version circulated widely amongst Plainsong fans. (Note: Note that the track listings of Sides A and B were reversed when the album was officially released in 2005 as Now We Are 3.) Several songs from the intended follow-up album would subsequently appear on various Roberts and Matthews solo albums - "Urban Cowboy" for instance became the title song of Roberts' 1973 solo album, and "Keep On Sailing" and "Save Your Sorrows" would appear on Matthews' 1973 solo album Valley Hi.

In Search of Amelia Earhart in its original form was unavailable on CD for many years, being issued as a Japanese-only CD by Warner-Elektra in 1991 and then reissued by Matthews' own label Perfect Pitch in 2001, and more recently by Man In The Moon Records in 2016. The unissued Plainsong III, now under the Now We Are 3 title, finally saw the light of day in 2005 as the second disc of a 2-CD re-issue by Water Records just entitled Plainsong, where both Plainsong albums featured along with radio recordings, demos and singles, including "Along Comes Mary".

Three albums of archive Plainsong recordings were released on CD in the 1990s, including And That's That - The Demos, comprising recordings made for the band's unreleased second album, and two versions of On Air containing tracks recorded at the BBC studios in several sessions throughout 1972. The BBC material was also re-released in 2022 as part of a 50th anniversary box set on Cherry Red Records.

Plainsong also recorded two television sessions for the BBC2 music programme The Old Grey Whistle Test, appearing on 7 March and 17 October 1972 respectively. Introduced by presenter Bob Harris, Plainsong's performance of "Even The Guiding Light" from the October OGWT show can be viewed on YouTube.

== Revival ==
In March 1990, some eighteen years after the original band disbanded, Andy Roberts encountered Iain Matthews again when he was performing in a pub, The Richmond, in Brighton whilst touring the UK as a duo with American musician Mark Hallman who had produced his solo albums Walking A Changing Line and Pure & Crooked. (Note: Pure & Crooked was the first album released under the name Iain Matthews rather than Ian Matthews) After playing together on Matthews’ booking at the Cambridge Folk Festival in July 1990 and on his European tour later that same year, and with all previous issues now swept aside, the two decided to revive Plainsong once more.

Adding former Matthews Southern Comfort guitarist Mark Griffiths and singer/songwriter Julian Dawson, they reformed the band in 1992, recording an album of new Plainsong music, Dark Side of the Room, before returning to touring in August 1993. Their concert in Mayrhofen, Austria and appearance at the 1993 Tønder Festival in Denmark would be the first Plainsong gigs for some 20 years. Two more albums, Voices Electric and Sister Flute would follow before Dawson left in 1996 to pursue his solo career. His replacement in 1997 was Clive Gregson, once of Any Trouble and later Gregson & Collister. The new line-up with Gregson went out on tour in 1997 and recorded another new Plainsong album New Place Now in 1999, before Matthews and Roberts recorded a 6-track mini-album in 2001, A To B, (Note: The A and B in the title referred to Amsterdam and Brighton where Matthews and Roberts respectively lived at that time) as a duo under the Plainsong name. For the next Plainsong album, Pangolins in 2003, (Note: The album's title Pangolins was a simple anagram of the band's name Plainsong) Dawson rejoined the band replacing Gregson.

In its various line-ups, Plainsong performed and toured throughout the 1990s and 2000s. What was planned to be their final album, Fat Lady Singing (recorded live in the studio during their last tour in 2004) was released in 2012, that year marking the 40th anniversary of the formation of the original band. Plainsong promoted the album by undertaking a 40th Anniversary Farewell tour of Europe covering Germany, Austria, Holland, Denmark and the UK before disbanding as a quartet. Their performance at Norderstedt in Germany on 4 September 2012 was recorded live and broadcast on NDR Radio. The 'final tour' culminated with two dates in Japan in October 2012.

However, final album and tour it turned out not to be. In 2014, Matthews and Roberts decided to record some of the songs of Richard Fariña, to mark the approaching 50th anniversary of his death. With Mark Griffiths back on board playing guitar and bass, the decision to use the Plainsong name made sense, and the group was again re-activated, this time as a trio. The album Reinventing Richard: The Songs Of Richard Fariña was released in 2015. In July 2016, the trio played a handful of UK shows to promote the album, beginning at Whitstable in Kent, with US and European dates following later in September and October.

The same Plainsong line-up came back together again for the Cropredy Festival in August 2017, celebrating Fairport Convention's 50th anniversary. The reformed band played a 12-song set featuring mostly songs from the Reinventing Richard and Amelia Earhart albums. Iain Matthews also rejoined Fairport Convention later that evening during their headlining set, singing vocals on several songs including "Reno Nevada" and "Meet On The Ledge". The concert was later released as the Fairport Convention 2-CD What We Did On Our Saturday.

Nearly fifty years on from the formation of the band, Matthews and Roberts revived Plainsong yet again in 2021, playing a short tour of the UK including gigs at two of their favourite music venues, The Greys in Brighton and the Half Moon in Putney. Like their Cropredy performance in 2017, their set list featured several Richard Fariña songs plus cuts from the Amelia Earhart album. They also toured at the end of 2022 to promote the new Plainsong book and box set.

== 50th Anniversary ==
=== In Search of Plainsong ===
“Ian Clayton charts Plainsong's genesis within the wider musical context of both English folk-rock and what would become Americana. By drawing on interviews with surviving members, managers, road managers, diaries and unpublished memoirs, fans and record labels, Clayton paints an astonishingly complete portrait of the band's initial 12-month existence, and his conversational part biography, part oral history approach keeps the reader engaged.”

— Shindig, November 2022

Written during the Covid lockdown in 2020 by broadcaster and author Ian Clayton who had previously collaborated with Matthews on his 2018 biography, In Search of Plainsong from UK-based Route Publishing was initially released via their online website in mid-March 2022. With a Foreword by Clinton Heylin, author of What We Did Instead of Holidays and No More Sad Refrains about Fairport Convention and Sandy Denny respectively, the book is divided into two parts: ‘Call The Tune’ which charts the band’s origins leading up to their formation in December 1971, and ‘Face The Music’ which follows the band throughout 1972 to their break-up at the end of the year.

A Route-only Deluxe version was also made available and included a limited edition CD comprising an edited version of a Plainsong concert recorded in Amsterdam in April 1972, plus several Plainsong demo recordings. The book went on general release some six months later on 2 September 2022 to favourable reviews, including a 4-star rating from music journalist Nick Dalton in the August 2022 edition of Record Collector. An equally positive review also appeared in the November edition of Shindig magazine.

In addition, writing in the 13 October 2022 edition of online publication Americana UK, journalist Rick Bayles wrote “Ian Clayton has written the book this outstanding band have always deserved. The full story of what happened to Amelia Earhart may never be fully resolved but 'In Search of Plainsong' finally dispels the myths and mysteries around one of the great bands of English Folk Rock.”

=== Following Amelia: The 1972 Recordings & More ===
Released as a 6-CD box set on 21 October 2022 by Cherry Red Records on their Lemon label, Following Amelia: The 1972 Recordings & More brought together a 50th anniversary re-issue of their 1972 debut album In Search Of Amelia Earhart digitally remastered from the original reel-to-reel master tapes, their second originally unreleased follow-up album Now We Are 3, and a host of previously unissued tracks from Matthews' and Roberts' own archives and from the collections of fans worldwide.

The box set includes two discs of BBC recordings from the various shows they did for John Peel and Bob Harris, and also includes the rare Sounds On Sunday radio broadcast, the very last recording they made together at the end of December 1972 before their break-up. (Note: Plainsong's last performance together for Sounds on Sunday was recorded on December 29th 1972 at the BBC’s Maida Vale studios. The show was hosted by presenter Alan Black and recorded under the guidance of legendary BBC producer Frances Line, who eventually became Controller of Radio 2 in 1990, the first woman to hold that post. The session was broadcast on Radio 1 on 7 January 1973.) It also contains the full unedited version of the Folk Fairport concert (Note: An impromptu concert recorded on 25 April 1972 at a cafe called Folk Fairport after appearing earlier that night at Amsterdam's legendary Paradiso club.) in Amsterdam mastered from the original tape, excerpts from the very first concert by the reformed Plainsong in Mayrhofen, Austria in 1993 (Note: Recorded live at the Hotel Strass in Mayrhofen, Austria on 26 August 1993, Plainsong's first live performance since December 1972, and the first to feature new band members Mark Griffiths and Julian Dawson.), and a set of six acoustic remakes of Amelia Earhart songs originally recorded in 2020 to accompany the Ian Clayton book. (Note: Acoustic demos of the entire Amelia Earhart album were recorded in June 2020 at Roberts’ home studio in Brighton. In the event the Covid epidemic meant they were not able to be completed as planned and released with the book.)

Like the book, Following Amelia also received a 4-star review from Record Collector and numerous positive reviews from online publications such as Spirit of Progressive Rock, At The Barrier, The Second Disc and Spiral Earth.

=== UK Promotional Tour ===
Both the book and the box set were promoted by Matthews and Roberts as the two surviving members of the original band during a short tour of the UK in December 2022. (Note: The UK tour comprised 6 dates as follows: 7 December 2022 - Bulls Head, Barnes, London; 8 December 2022 - St. Mary’s Church, Twyford, Hampshire; 10 December - Mary Cryan's House Concert, Hull, Yorkshire; 11 December 2022 - The Pigeon Loft, Robin Hood pub, Pontefract, Yorkshire (afternoon matinee and evening concerts); 12 December 2022 - The Greys, Brighton.) The various performances began with a selection of songs chosen by Matthews and Roberts from their respective solo careers before turning to purely Plainsong material. The set lists included numerous tracks from their debut 1972 album In Search Of Amelia Earhart. A 4-song segue of ‘Amelia' songs from their evening performance in Pontefract on 11 December can be viewed on Route TV’s YouTube channel and a review by Paul Stewart of the final show in Brighton was published online on 16 December 2022 by Brighton Source.

== Discography ==
=== Original line-up ===
- In Search of Amelia Earhart (1972 vinyl) UK and US Elektra Records
  - First issued on CD in Japan, 1991, Elektra / Warner-Pioneer Corporation
  - Reissued on CD, 2001, Perfect Pitch
  - Reissued on CD, 2016, Man In The Moon
- On Air - Original BBC Recordings (recorded 1972, released 1992, Band Of Joy Records)
  - Plainsong On Air (expanded version with two extra tracks released 1997, Strange Fruit Records)
- And That's That - The Demos (recorded 1972, released 1992, Taxim Records)
- Plainsong 2-CD (2005) Water Records
  - CD1 features In Search Of Amelia Earhart, plus seven tracks of radio sessions and one demo
  - CD2 features Now We Are 3 (previously unreleased second album), plus seven live tracks and two singles

=== Revival ===
- Dark Side Of The Room (1992) Line Records
- Voices Electric (1994) Line Records
- Sister Flute (1996) Line Records
- New Place Now (1999) Spinalong Records UK / Blue Rose Records Europe
- Live In Austria (1999) Plainsong (Four-track mini-CD, live in Thalgäu)
- A To B (2001) Spinalong Records (Six-track mini-CD)
- Pangolins (2003) Blue Rose Records
- Fat Lady Singing (2012) Blue Rose Records
- Reinventing Richard: The Songs Of Richard Fariña (2015) Fledg’ling Records

=== Box Set ===
- Following Amelia: The 1972 Recordings & More (2022) Cherry Red Records.
  - 6-CD box set containing remastered versions of In Search Of Amelia Earhart, Now We Are 3 plus BBC recordings, various demos and the live Folk Fairport concert from 1972.

=== Blue Rose Records compilations ===
Plainsong tracks appear on various Blue Rose compilation CDs:

- Blue Rose Collection Vol.6 (1999) : Plainsong "Following Amelia"
- Blue Rose Collection Vol.10 (2003) : Plainsong "Barbed Wire Fence"
- Blue Rose Nuggets 3 (2003) : Plainsong "Needle In The Hay".
- Blue Rose Nuggets 11 (2005) : Plainsong "Even The Guiding Light" recorded live at the Hospitalkirche in Schwäbisch Hall, Germany, 8 May 2003
- Blue Rose Nuggets 27 (2007) : Plainsong "Footsteps Fall".
- Blue Rose Nuggets 46 (2010) : Plainsong "Here Comes The Rain".
- Blue Rose Nuggets 57 (2012) : Plainsong "Sloth".
- Various Artists – 20 Years Blue Rose Records – Best Of Americana Rock Music Vol. 2 Past and Present (2CD) (2015) :

Plainsong "Barbed Wire Fence"

- Blue Rose Nuggets 95 (2019) : Plainsong "I Can't Let Go".

=== Other compilation albums ===
Plainsong tracks can also be found on two compilation albums released under Iain Matthews' name.

- The Soul Of Many Places - The Elektra Years 1972-1974 (1993) Elektra Records
- Orphans And Outcasts (2019) Cherry Red Records
  - 4-CD box set containing remastered versions of Orphans And Outcasts Volumes 1-3, plus a fourth CD of newly-curated outtakes and demo recordings.

Plainsong tracks from both the original band and the revival bands can also be found on numerous other compilation albums.

== Recommended reading ==
- Ian Clayton: In Search Of Plainsong, Route Publishing, 2022; ISBN 978-1901927-87-0
- Iain Matthews with Ian Clayton: Thro' My Eyes: A Memoir, Route Publishing, 2018; ISBN 978-1901927-75-7
