= Sandy Roberton =

British record producer (1942–2022)

- Born: Alexander William Roberton; 7 July 1942; Edinburgh, Scotland
- Died: 25 July 2022 (aged 80) London, England
- Occupations: Record producer, businessman
- Website: worldsend.com/about/

Alexander William Roberton (7 July 1942 – 25 July 2022), known professionally as Sandy Roberton, was a British record producer, artist manager, and music industry executive. He played a prominent role in the development of the British folk-rock scene in the 1970s, producing early albums by Steeleye Span, Shirley Collins, Plainsong, and John Martyn. In addition to producing over fifty albums, he was also involved in artist and producer management, founding Worlds End Producer Management in 1980, a pioneering agency representing engineers, mixers, and producers.

Under Roberton's leadership, Worlds End became a globally influential producer management company, working with clients involved in recordings of David Bowie, U2, and Robert Plant. He later co-founded the record label Beverly Martel and the creative company IAMSOUND with his daughter, Niki Roberton. Known for his foresight in adapting to shifts in the music industry, he remained active in management and deal-making until shortly before his death.

== Early years ==
Roberton was born in Edinburgh, Scotland, on 7 July 1942. At the age of six, he emigrated with his parents to Africa, where his father Robert worked as a tractor technician in the British government's post-war Tanganyika Groundnut Scheme in East Africa. Roberton spent his early years in Tanganyika and Kenya, where he became involved in the local music scene. As a teenager, Roberton performed in the band Les Hombres.

== Career ==
=== Early career (1963–1967) ===
In 1963, Roberton moved to London to pursue a career in music. He worked day jobs at Olivetti and C&A. He was part of a duo act, with schoolmate Rick Tykiff, which performed at the King's Head pub in Soho. As a duo, they signed with producer Tom Springfield (brother of Dusty Springfield) and released singles like "Half as Much" (1965) on Decca and Mercury. Later tracks were arranged by songwriter Les Reed.

After Tykiff's departure, Roberton released solo covers under aliases. In 1966, he released a cover of "Solitary Man" by Neil Diamond under the alias Sandy on Columbia; the following year, he released a cover of "Mama, You Been on My Mind" by Bob Dylan, titled "Baby You've Been on My Mind," under the alias Lucien Alexander on Polydor, backed by Fleur de Lys.

=== Music publishing (1967–1968) ===
Roberton managed the London office of Chess Records' publishing arms, including Arc Music, founded by Leonard and Phil Chess and later owned by BMG, Regent Music, which published artists like Bo Diddley and Howlin' Wolf, and Jewel Music, which was acquired by Primary Wave in 2022.

He also represented Bill Lowery's catalog including artists Joe South and Tommy Roe. Roberton secured covers like Georgie Fame's "Sitting in the Park" (UK No. 12, 1966) and Little Walter's "It Ain't Right" for John Mayall's Blues Breakers with Eric Clapton (1966).

=== Blue Horizon and production (1968–1976) ===
Roberton joined Mike Vernon's Blue Horizon label and co-founded the publishing companies Goodie Two Shoes Music and Uncle Doris Music. He produced two singles by the Chocolate Watch Band (which featured singer-songwriter Gary Osborne) in 1967, early albums by Steeleye Span, including Hark! The Village Wait, from 1970 to 1971, and Shirley Collins's 1971 album No Roses, which was nominated for Melody Maker's "Folk Album of the Year."

=== September Productions (1968–1976) ===
In 1968, Roberton founded September Productions Ltd. Under it, he managed: The Liverpool Scene from 1968 to 1970, producing their debut album with John Peel and touring with Led Zeppelin; Plainsong from 1971 to 1972, producing their debut album In Search of Amelia Earhart; and solo works by Iain Matthews and Andy Roberts.

=== Rockburgh Records (1977–1981) ===
In 1977, Roberton launched Rockburgh Records. The label released music by various artists including Wilko Johnson, Allan Taylor, and Iain Matthews--whose 1978 song "Shake It" rose to No.13 in the US (from the album Stealin' Home).

=== Worlds End Management (c. 1980–2022) ===
In the 1980s, Roberton shifted to managing productions, founding Worlds End Management. His final production credit was for John Martyn's 1982 album, Well Kept Secret.

== Personal life ==
In 1968, Roberton married Dinah (née Cullen), his former personal assistant whom he met at music publishers Chappell & Co. They had two children, Christian and Nicola.Roberton died from cancer in London on 25 July 2022, age 80.

== Recommended reading ==
- Ian Clayton: In Search Of Plainsong, Route Publishing, 2022; ISBN 978-1901927-87-0
- Iain Matthews with Ian Clayton: Thro' My Eyes: A Memoir, Route Publishing, 2018; ISBN 978-1901927-75-7
- Clinton Heylin: What We Did Instead Of Holidays: A History Of Fairport Convention And Its Extended Folk-Rock Family. Route Publishing, 2018; ISBN 978-1901927-73-3
