= David W. Jourdan =

David Walter Jourdan (born December 5, 1954) is an American author, founder of Meridian Sciences, and the co-founder and president of Nauticos, a deep ocean exploration company. He studied physics and engineering at the U.S. Naval Academy and Johns Hopkins University, and served as a U.S. Navy submarine officer during the Cold War. Jourdan and his Nauticos team have made a number of notable deep ocean discoveries, including the missing Israeli submarine INS Dakar in the Mediterranean and the Japanese aircraft carrier Kaga, sunk in the Battle of Midway. He has led three deep ocean expeditions in search of Amelia Earhart and Fred Noonan’s Lockheed Electra airplane in the ocean off Howland Island, the atoll Earhart and Noonan were attempting to find when they vanished. He has published several books, Never Forgotten: the Search and Discovery of Israel's Lost Submarine Dakar; The Deep Sea Quest for Amelia Earhart.; and The Search for the Japanese Fleet: USS Nautilus and the Battle of Midway.

He refutes the theory that Earhart and Noonan landed on Gardner Island (now called Nikumaroro) in the Phoenix Island Group, claiming that any transmissions attributed to Gardner Island were false. Through his company Nauticos he extensively searched a 1,200-square-mile (3,100 km^{2}) quadrant north and west of Howland Island during three deep-sea sonar search expeditions (2002, 2006 & 2017) and found nothing. The search locations were derived from the line of position (157–337) broadcast by Earhart on July 2, 1937. Nevertheless, Elgen Long's interpretations have led Jourdan to conclude, "The analysis of all the data we have – the fuel analysis, the radio calls, other things – tells me she went into the water off Howland."

In 2024, Jourdan said in response to Deep Sea Vision finding what appeared to be the remains of an aircraft that might be the Electra on the ocean floor near Howland, "It is impossible to identify anything from a sonar image alone as sound can be tricky and the artifact could be damaged in unpredictable ways altering its shape. For that reason, you can never say that something is (or isn’t) from a sonar image alone.". Ultimately a follow up expedition by Deep Sea Vision determined the sonar image to be a geological formation.

== See also ==
- Elgen Long
