= Marc Ellington =

Scottish singer-songwriter (1945–2021)

- Born: Marc Floyd Ellington; 16 December 1945; Stoneham, Massachusetts, U.S.
- Died: 17 February 2021 (aged 75) Aberdeenshire, Scotland
- Genre: Folk-rock
- Occupation: Singer-songwriter
- Instruments: Guitar, bagpipes
- Labels: Philips, B&C, Transatlantic

Marc Floyd Ellington (16 December 1945 – 17 February 2021) was an American-born British folk and folk-rock singer-songwriter, guitarist and bagpiper. He recorded in Britain in the late 1960s and 1970s, and became active in conservation work in Scotland, restoring his home at Towie Barclay Castle, Aberdeenshire.

== Early life ==
The son of a radio broadcaster, Ellington was born in Stoneham, Massachusetts, U.S., a suburb of Boston. (Some sources wrongly give his birthplace as Boston, Lincolnshire, England.) In the early 1960s, he played in a folk group, The Highwaymen, in Eugene, Oregon.

== Move to Britain ==
He moved to Britain to avoid the Vietnam War draft, and in 1967, he was married in London. He was described as "the first American to refuse his draft call publicly in Great Britain", and was pictured presenting his US Army induction papers to Canon John Collins in what he described as "a symbolic gesture in seeking the sanctuary of the Church".

A singer-songwriter and guitarist, Ellington made his first recordings in London for Philips Records in 1968. These included versions of Bob Dylan's songs "I Shall Be Released" and "Peggy Day". Several Dylan songs alongside others by Tim Hardin, Al Stewart, Phil Ochs and John Martyn were included on Ellington's debut LP, Marc Ellington, released in 1969, which contained arrangements by Johnny Arthey. He also provided backing vocals on Fairport Convention's third album, Unhalfbricking, in 1969, and appeared on former Fairport Convention member Ian Matthews' debut solo album Matthews' Southern Comfort.

Ellington recorded his second solo album, Rains/Reins of Changes in 1971, for the B&C label; in North America it was issued by Ampex Records. This time, the album featured mainly his own songs, and most featured members of Fairport Convention. He then returned to the Philips label for two further albums, A Question of Roads (1972) and Restoration (1974). His final solo album, Marc Time, was issued by Transatlantic Records in 1975. Marc Time was also the name of a folk music series presented by Ellington on Grampian Television in the 1970s.

He became a British citizen in 1979 through the naturalization process. He continued to perform, often working on recordings with Richard and Linda Thompson, and occasionally performing at Fairport Convention's Cropredy Festival. In later years he performed in local Scottish clubs, and to help promote tourism in Scotland.

== Conservation work in Scotland ==
He developed close ties with Scotland – he played bagpipes on recordings, and dedicated one track to the National Trust for Scotland. In the late 1960s, he and his wife Karen bought Towie Barclay Castle, near Turriff in Aberdeenshire, which had fallen into "a desperate state of disrepair". The restoration, which was financed by Ellington's music work, took several years to complete, and won a Saltire Award in 1973. Ellington and his wife and family continued to live in the castle. In 2017, he said:

When Karen and I decided to restore Towie Barclay it hadn't been lived in for 200 years, it was nothing but a ruin when we started work in 1969. There was ivy everywhere but we had a vision and we’ve stayed true to it, we were unlucky enough not to have pictures and plans of what the castle used to be like and the restoration process took us four years. I am passionate about the history and heritage of Scotland and in particular Aberdeenshire which is very dear to my heart, there are moments when I sit here and look around in wonder. We tried to conserve and restore the features of the original building and although we made alterations for contemporary living we kept that side to a minimum. I feel very inspired here and although I don't feel any ghostly presence I can imagine what went on. When I first saw Towie Barclay I saw not what it was but what it could be – it was a ruin desperately in need of restoration.

Later, Marc and Karen Ellington took over Lairdship of the villages of Gardenstown and Crovie, and the Tomnaverie stone circle, one of the recumbent stone circles characteristic of Northeast Scotland.

Marc Ellington was awarded an honorary degree from the University of Aberdeen in 2015 because of his conservation work, and was appointed the Deputy Lieutenant of Aberdeenshire on 26 October 1984, and a member of the Heritage Lottery Fund Committee for Scotland. He was also a board member of the Historic Buildings Council (1980–1988), the Grampian Enterprise and the British Heritage Committee. He was a non-executive director of Historic Scotland (2005–2011), a board member of Banff and Buchan College and a Trustee of the National Galleries of Scotland (2002–2010). He set up the Scottish Traditional Skills Training Centre.

In 2015, he led a project to erect a cairn to those from the Cabrach area who lost their lives during the First World War, which was inaugurated by the Prince of Wales. A keen sailor, he also commentated at the annual Portsoy Small Boats Festival.

== Awards and honours ==
- 26 October 1984 – Deputy Lieutenant of Aberdeenshire
- 1988 – Serving Brother of the Most Venerable Order of the Hospital of Saint John of Jerusalem
- 2004 – Officer of the Most Venerable Order of the Hospital of Saint John of Jerusalem
- 2014 – Honorary Fellowship, Royal Incorporation of Architects in Scotland
- 2015 – Honorary Doctorate Honoris Causa, University of Aberdeen

== Death ==
Marc Ellington developed a serious heart condition, and died on 17 February 2021.

== Discography ==
=== Albums ===
- Marc Ellington (Philips, 1969)
- Rains/Reins of Changes (B&C, 1971)
- A Question of Roads (Philips, 1972)
- Restoration (Philips, 1973)
- Marc Time (Transatlantic, 1975)

== Publications ==
- Craigievar Castle (National Trust for Scotland, 1987)
- The Lost City: Old Aberdeen (Birlinn, 2008)
- Scotland's Secret History: The Illicit Distilling and Smuggling of Whisky (Birlinn, 2017)
