= Roger Swallow =

English producer, musician and songwriter

Roger Swallow (born 23 February 1946 in Northampton, England) is an English producer, musician and songwriter. He was a member of The Albion Band and worked with many artistes in the late 1960s/early 1970s as a session and touring drummer/percussionist.

== Early career ==
Starting his music career in rock and roll and rhythm and blues in Northampton, his early music projects brought him to London where he worked in children's television for the BBC and toured England playing for theatrical companies, before working for the Beatles' Apple Publishing on Baker Street in the late 1960s and forming Smile with Denis Couldry (also featuring musicians Chris Spedding and Mark Griffiths), recording for Decca Records.

== Session and touring musician ==
As a session and touring drummer/percussionist in the late 1960s/early 1970s Swallow worked with such bands & artists as Harsh Reality, Plainsong and Matthews Southern Comfort (both with Iain Matthews), Al Stewart, Neil Innes, Principal Edwards Magic Theatre, and many singer songwriters of that era, but is perhaps best known in the British traditional arena with collaborations with Albion Country Band, Richard Thompson, Martin Carthy, John Kirkpatrick, Musica Resavarta, Robin Williamson, Norma Waterson. After relocating from London to Los Angeles in the mid 1970s he began a parallel career in business management and real estate development but his credits as a percussionist also included such artists as Leon Russell and Rickie Lee Jones and others.

== Business pursuits ==
Later, as a lyricist/songwriter, Swallow has had solo recordings and chart successes writing for other artistes in the UK and Europe. Longtime collaborator and friend, producer Stephen Hague, a colleague from the Polar Bear days, is also co-owner with Swallow in London's famous Manna vegetarian restaurant. They also collaborate in their 'Blue Panda' enterprises, including real estate, recording studio, publishing, management & music production. His current projects are sheRifff, a collaboration of Los Angeles jazz musicians and vocalists for soundtracks, etc., and ongoing recordings with bFas. As a business professional, through swlo inc, Swallow has developed and managed real estate projects in California, Hawaii, and Florida. Most notably the boutique Hotel Metropole on Santa Catalina Island, off the coast of Los Angeles, which he has developed with the Miller family of Los Angeles (no relation to Judd).

He has four decades of experience with electronica, including collaborative efforts with Florida's musician-laureate Jack Tamul, a renowned electronic synthesist, and then in one of the first pop music onstage electronic percussion experiments he played with the legendary Los Angeles band, Jules and the Polar Bears, with songwriter/vocalist Jules Shear and producer/keyboardist/programmer Stephen Hague. His more current, collaborative projects are with Sound Designer & master EVI (electronic valve instrument) player Judd Miller, including their ambient group bFas (Blood from a Stone).
