= Woodstock (song) =

1970 single by Joni Mitchell

- Side B of the Canadian single

Single by Joni Mitchell

from the album Ladies of the Canyon
- A-side: "Big Yellow Taxi"
- Released: April 1970
- Recorded: 1970
- Studio: A&M, Hollywood
- Genre: Folk rock
- Length: 5:25
- Label: Reprise
- Songwriter: Joni Mitchell
- Producer: Joni Mitchell

Joni Mitchell singles chronology
"Chelsea Morning" (1969)	"Woodstock" (1970)	"Carey" (1971)

Official audio
- "Woodstock" by Joni Mitchell on YouTube

"Woodstock" is a song written by Canadian-American singer-songwriter Joni Mitchell. At least four versions of the song were released in 1970. Mitchell's own version was first performed live in 1969 and appeared in April 1970 on her album Ladies of the Canyon and as the B-side to her single "Big Yellow Taxi". A version by Crosby, Stills, Nash & Young appeared on their album Déjà Vu in March 1970 and became a staple of classic rock radio and the best-known version of the song in the United States. A third version, by the British band Matthews Southern Comfort, became the best-known version in the United Kingdom and was the highest charting version of the song in the UK, reaching the top of the Singles Chart in 1970. A fourth version by studio project the Assembled Multitude also became a chart hit.

The song's lyrics refer to the four-day Woodstock Music and Arts Festival held in August 1969, and tell the story of a concert-goer on a trek to Max Yasgur's farm in New York State to join in the "song and celebration". Mitchell, who was unable to perform at the festival herself, was inspired to write the song after she heard an account of it from her then-boyfriend Graham Nash, who had performed at the festival. Mitchell's song and the festival it commemorated became symbolic of the counterculture of the 1960s.

== Lyrics ==
Joni Mitchell's lyrics were based on the description of the Woodstock Music and Art Festival she was given by her then-boyfriend, Graham Nash. She had not been able to go to the festival herself because a manager had told her that it would be more advantageous for her to appear on The Dick Cavett Show. She composed the song in a hotel room in New York City as she watched televised reports of the festival. "The deprivation of not being able to go provided me with an intense angle on Woodstock", she told an interviewer afterwards. David Crosby, interviewed for the documentary Joni Mitchell: Woman of Heart and Mind, said Mitchell had captured in her song the feeling and importance of the Woodstock festival better than anyone who had actually been there.

The lyrics tell the story of a spiritual journey to Max Yasgur's farm, where the festival was held, and make use of sacred imagery, comparing the festival site with the Garden of Eden ("and we've got to get ourselves back to the garden"). The saga commences with the narrator's encounter of a fellow traveler ("Well, I came upon a child of God, he was walking along the road") and concludes with their arrival at their destination ("by the time we got to Woodstock, we were half a million strong"). There is also reference to the "mutual assured destruction" ideology of the Cold War ("bombers riding shotgun in the sky..."), contrasted with the peaceful intent of the festival goers ("...turning into butterflies above our nation").

== Releases and versions ==
=== Joni Mitchell ===
Mitchell performed "Woodstock" seated at a piano at the 1969 Big Sur Folk Festival, one month after Woodstock, prior to its release on any album. Her solo performance can be seen in the festival concert film Celebration at Big Sur, released in 1971. (Mitchell had not yet developed her distaste for large festival gigs.) "Woodstock" was released on Mitchell's third album, Ladies of the Canyon in April 1970, and served as the B-side for the album's single, "Big Yellow Taxi". She re-recorded "Woodstock" for her two live albums, Miles of Aisles and Shadows and Light. The original track was included on the 1996 compilation Hits and featured a stark and haunting arrangement of solo vocal, multi-tracked backing vocals and tremoloed Wurlitzer electric piano, all performed by Mitchell.

=== Crosby, Stills, Nash & Young ===
"Woodstock"
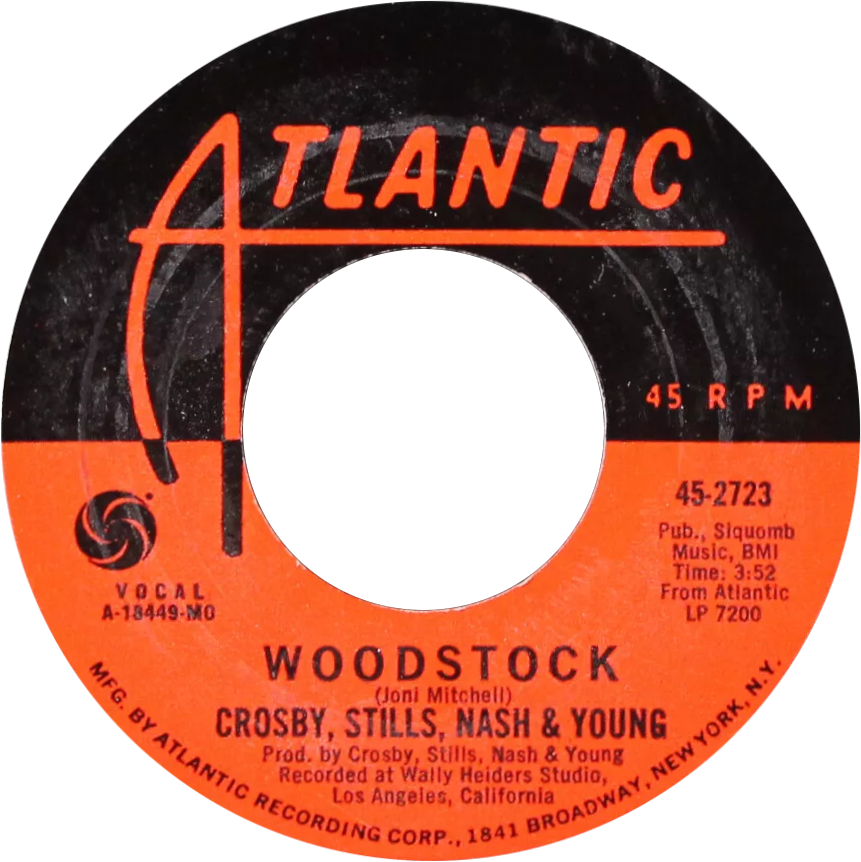
- One of side-A labels of the US single

Single by Crosby, Stills, Nash & Young

from the album Déjà Vu
- B-side: "Helpless"
- Released: March 1970
- Recorded: 5 November 1969
- Studio: Wally Heider Studio C, San Francisco; Studio III, Los Angeles
- Genre: Psychedelic rock; blues rock
- Length: 3:54
- Label: Atlantic
- Songwriter: Joni Mitchell
- Producers: Crosby, Stills, Nash & Young

Crosby, Stills, Nash & Young singles chronology
"Suite: Judy Blue Eyes" (1969)	"Woodstock" (1970)	"Teach Your Children" (1970)

Audio sample
- file; help

Official audio
- "Woodstock" by Crosby, Stills, Nash & Young on YouTube

At about the same time that Ladies of the Canyon appeared, Crosby, Stills, Nash & Young's upbeat rock arrangement of "Woodstock" was released as the lead single from their 1970 Déjà Vu album. The CSNY version opened with a lead guitar riff played by Neil Young, who also played the solo. Stephen Stills sang the lead vocal, with backing harmonies from David Crosby, Graham Nash, and Young. The Crosby, Stills, Nash & Young version of "Woodstock" was also notable for its stop-time instrument patterns, just prior to the "We are stardust, we are golden..." chorus.

Crosby, Stills, Nash & Young had learned the song from Mitchell, who was Nash's girlfriend at the time, but the band's version introduced major changes in tone. Jimi Hendrix was involved early in the song's development, and a recording taped on 30 September 1969, half a year before the album came out, with Hendrix playing bass and overdubbing guitar, was released in 2018 on the album Both Sides of the Sky. Sound engineer Eddie Kramer stated that with Jimi was "... helping the song along, it sounds like Crosby, Stills & Hendrix". The final version had Stephen Stills singing a slightly rearranged version of Mitchell's lyrics which put the line "we are billion year old carbon", which only appeared in her final chorus, into each of the first three choruses. That line was replaced with "we are caught in the devil's bargain" in the last chorus, which was also in Mitchell's final chorus.

"Woodstock" was one of the few Déjà Vu tracks on which Crosby, Stills, Nash, and Young all performed their parts in the same session. The original lead vocal by Stephen Stills was later partly replaced with a vocal recorded by Stills, who recalled: "I replaced one and a half verses that were excruciatingly out of tune." Neil Young disagreed, saying that "the track was magic. Then later on [Crosby, Stills & Nash] were in the studio nitpicking [with the result that] Stephen erased the vocal and put another one on that wasn't nearly as good."

The Crosby, Stills, Nash & Young version of "Woodstock" peaked at #11 on the Billboard Hot 100 in May 1970 and #3 in Canada. A different recording of "Woodstock" by Crosby, Stills, Nash & Young was played under the closing credits of the documentary film Woodstock released March 1970.

Cash Box said that "C, S, N & Y steam along with a splendid song by Joni Mitchell" and "the foursome offer some much more solid undercurrents in the instrumental end."

==== Personnel ====
- David Crosby – harmony vocals, electric rhythm guitar
- Stephen Stills – lead vocals, organ
- Graham Nash – harmony vocals, piano
- Neil Young – harmony vocals, electric lead guitar

Additional musicians

- Greg Reeves – bass guitar
- Dallas Taylor – drums

=== Matthews Southern Comfort ===
"Woodstock"
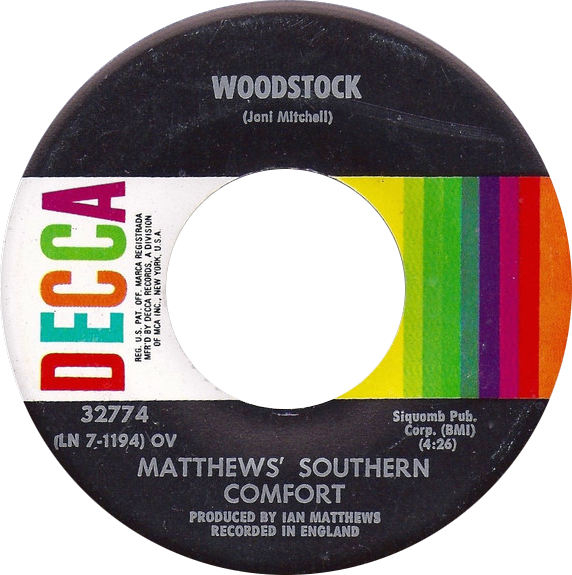
- One of side-A labels of the US single

Single by Matthews Southern Comfort

from the album Later That Same Year
- B-side: "Scion" (UK); "Ballad of Obray Ramsey" (US)
- Released: 24 July 1970
- Recorded: 1970
- Studio: Morgan Studios, London, England
- Genre: Folk rock, psychedelic rock
- Length: 4:26
- Label: Uni
- Songwriter: Joni Mitchell
- Producer: Iain Matthews

Matthews Southern Comfort UK singles chronology
"Ballad of Obray Ramsey" (1970)	"Woodstock" (1970)	"Mare, Take Me Home" (1971)

Matthews Southern Comfort US singles chronology
"Colorado Springs Eternal" (1970)	"Woodstock" (1970)	"Mare, Take Me Home" (1971)

"Woodstock" became an international hit in 1970 and 1971 thanks to a recording by Matthews Southern Comfort. The group performed "Woodstock" in the UK's Live in Concert program, broadcast by BBC Radio 1 on 28 June 1970. Front man Iain Matthews recalled later that the group had prepared three songs for the session but the BBC needed one more, and he had suggested an impromptu cover of "Woodstock", having heard Joni Mitchell's version on her Ladies of the Canyon album earlier that week. There was a positive response to the song after the broadcast and the BBC contacted Matthews's label, Uni Records. According to Matthews, the label "had no idea what the [BBC] were talking about and contacted my management, who asked me about it. Uni suggested that we record the song and add it to the newly recorded Matthews Southern Comfort album, Later That Same Year (ultimately appearing on its US edition and subsequent re-issues). I declined to mess with the completed album, but agreed to have them release the song as a single."

Matthews said his band's BBC Radio performance of "Woodstock" echoed the original, but for the studio recording of the song, made at Morgan Sound in Willesden Green, London, the band radically changed the arrangement. Matthews later admitted to unease when he eventually met Joni Mitchell because he had changed the melody of the song ("... I couldn't reach [her] high notes") but Mitchell said she preferred his arrangement. Matthews Southern Comfort bassist Andy Leigh recalled, "We took [the song] apart and reassembled it and we knew we had something. We were an album band. We didn't do singles." (Uni had issued one single off each of the first two of the three Matthews Southern Comfort albums, but neither charted.) "But we knew this [track] ... was something special."

MCA Records, Uni's parent company, agreed to release Matthews Southern Comfort's version of "Woodstock" only if the Crosby Stills Nash & Young version failed to chart in the United Kingdom. When that proved to be the case, Leigh said MCA "reluctantly released ours because of that agreement, but they wouldn't spend a penny on promotion ... But our managers, who were excellent, hired a PR, a song-plugger. Tony Blackburn, who had the breakfast show on Radio 1, played 'Woodstock' and kept playing it and other DJs started doing the same." Matthews recalled that once Blackburn had made "Woodstock" by Matthews Southern Comfort his record of the week, "it began to sell 30,000 copies a day, eventually going from #10 to #1 in a week."

Issued on 24 July 1970, "Woodstock" debuted on the UK Top 50 on 26 September 1970 and reached #1 on 31 October 1970, remaining there for two additional weeks. It was a #2 hit in Ireland and had widespread success in Europe, charting in Austria (#15), Denmark (#9), Finland (#23), Germany (#27), the Netherlands (#17), Norway (#2), Poland (#2), and Sweden (#2). In early 1971 the track also reached #3 in South Africa, #4 in New Zealand and was a minor hit in Australia (#55).

In November 1970, "Woodstock" by Matthews Southern Comfort had its US single release on the group's regular US label, Decca Records, another MCA affiliate. Initially the single's US release had only a marginal impact, spending six weeks on the 101–150 singles chart in Record World in December 1970 – January 1971 and then dropping off, having peaked at #110. But after its January 1971 single release in Canada, where a 30% Canadian Content radio airplay quota was being phased in, the track received airplay, at least partially because of its Canadian author, and assisted by airplay on Canadian radio stations with US listeners, notably CKLW, the Windsor ON station credited with the track's Canadian "breakout", "Woodstock" gained newfound US interest, debuting on the Billboard Hot 100 of 6 March 1971 at #83 and rising to a #23 Hot 100 that May. In Canada "Woodstock" reached a #5 peak on the RPM 100 singles chart.

By the time of the North American success of Matthews Southern Comfort's "Woodstock", the band was no more. An October 1970 shake-up at MCA Records (UK) had resulted in the band splitting with MCA, causing the cancellation of a US tour that was set to begin that November, the month of "Woodstock's" US single release. In December 1970 Matthews abruptly quit the band. He later attributed his departure to the demands that came with the band's success with "Woodstock". He said, "It created all this peripheral stuff that took up my time. What would've been time learning to be a songwriter, became time spent doing interviews, photographs, tours and appearances;" "It all came to a head after a dreadful soundcheck at Birmingham town hall. I left the building, walked down to the station, got on a train home and locked my door for a week." Matthews' debut solo album If You Saw Thro' My Eyes was released on Vertigo Records on 1 May 1971. His former band co-members had three Harvest Records album releases as Southern Comfort before disbanding in 1972.

In the UK, "Woodstock" was the final single release by Matthews Southern Comfort, who had released two previous non-charting UK singles, and "Woodstock" remained Matthews' sole UK charting single. (Although previously a member of Fairport Convention, he had not featured on their one charting single, "Si tu dois partir", and he did not rank in the UK charts as a solo artist). In other territories, two further tracks were issued as singles from the third and final Matthews Southern Comfort album, Later That Same Year, which outside the UK included "Woodstock" : "Mare, Take Me Home" and "Tell Me Why", both of which made the Billboard Hot 100 at respectively #96 and #98, while "Mare, Take Me Home" peaked at #86 in Canada Matthews Southern Comfort had a total of four US single releases, having had one non-charting US single, "Colorado Springs Eternal", in April 1970. Iain Matthews – as Ian Matthews – as a solo act placed three singles on the Billboard Hot 100 and also the Canadian charts, one of which, the November 1978 release "Shake It", became a major hit, reaching a Billboard Hot 100 peak of #13 in April 1979, and reaching #6 in Canada.

Despite his difficulties with the success of "Woodstock" in 1970, Matthews said in 2017, "Any kind of success in this business takes me by surprise. 'Woodstock' was the first and most exciting. It's still opening new doors to this day."

== Chart history ==
=== Weekly charts ===
Crosby, Stills, Nash & Young

Chart (1970)	Peak position
Australia (Kent Music Report)	19
Canada RPM Top Singles	3
France (IFOP)	21
U.S. Billboard Hot 100	11
U.S. Cash Box Top 100	13
U.S. Record World Top 100	10

Assembled Multitude

Chart (1970)	Peak position
U.S. Billboard Hot 100	79
U.S. Billboard Easy Listening	23
U.S. Cash Box Top 100	78
U.S. Record World Top 100	71
Canada RPM Top 100	67

Matthews Southern Comfort

Chart (1970–1971)	Peak position
Australia (Kent Music Report)	55
Canada RPM Top Singles	5
Canada RPM Adult Contemporary	22
Ireland (IRMA)	2
New Zealand (Listener)	4
South Africa (Springbok)	3
UK Singles Chart	1
U.S. Billboard Hot 100	23
U.S. Billboard Easy Listening	17
U.S. Cash Box Top 100	17
U.S. Record World	18

=== Year-end charts ===
Crosby, Stills, Nash & Young

Chart (1970)	Rank
Australia	127
Canada	78
US Billboard Hot 100	94
US Cash Box	77

Matthews Southern Comfort Band

Chart (1970/71)	Rank
UK	17
Can	59

=== Others ===
- Led Zeppelin incorporated Woodstock's lyrics and structure into live renditions of "Dazed and Confused" between 1973 and 1975.
- In 1994 Toto co-founder and long time vocalist Bobby Kimball included a rock version of the song as opener on his solo album Rise Up. Kimball's version is closer to the arrangement of Crosby, Stills, Nash & Young than to Mitchell's original.
- In 1995 Tuck & Patti included their own version of "Woodstock" (with Patti adding scat-singing and percussive vocals in between the verses) in their album "Learning How to Fly."
- In 1997 James Taylor performed "Woodstock" live at the 12th annual Rock and Roll Hall of Fame induction ceremony in tribute to Crosby, Stills, Nash & Young.
- The 2000 album release Time After Time by Eva Cassidy featured her live rendition of "Woodstock" performed at the Maryland Inn in Annapolis in the winter of 1995. Cassidy was a fan of the Matthews Southern Comfort version.
- A version of "Woodstock" was released on the 2004 album Grace of the Sun by Richie Havens.
- On her 2008 album A Long and Winding Road, Maureen McGovern sings the first verse and chorus of "Woodstock" as lead-in to her rendition of "Imagine."
- America remade "Woodstock" for their 2012 release Back Pages, a cover album that, according to group member Gerry Beckley, comprised "killer songs that are great examples that come from our best songwriters." Beckley's co-member Dewey Bunnell stated: "Joni Mitchell's 'Woodstock' is an anthem for me in the truest sense...a call to action....and I've always been a child of the 60's at heart."
- Jack DeJohnette included the song in his 2017 album Hudson.
- The song "Dimitri Mendeleev" by Astronautalis contains the line "Joni Mitchell said 'we are stardust, we are golden'" in reference to "Woodstock".
- New Zealand recording artist Brooke Fraser released a cover of "Woodstock" on the special edition of her 2010 album Flags. The cover was also included on her 2019 compilation album, B Sides.
- In 2017, John Legend recorded a cover of the song as a Spotify Single.
- David Crosby re-recorded the song in his 2018 album Here If You Listen, with his Lighthouse Band: Michael League, Becca Stevens and Michelle Willis.
