= Mark Griffiths (musician) =

British musician

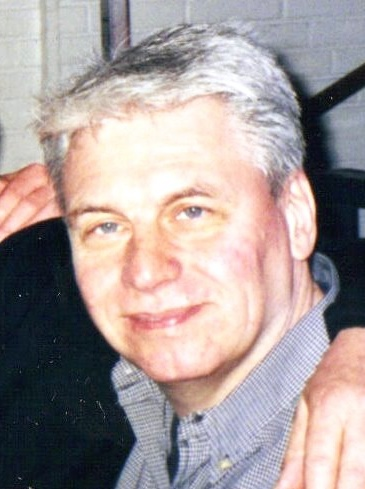
- Griffiths in 2005

Background information
- Born: Martin-Haydn Griffiths; Northampton, Northamptonshire, England, United Kingdom
- Occupation: Musician
- Instruments: Bass guitar
- Formerly of: The Rutles, The Shadows

Mark-Haydn Griffiths (born in Northampton, Northamptonshire) is a British bassist whose career begain with Matthews Southern Comfort. He toured with Neil Innes in his touring ensemble of the fictional Beatles parody the Rutles where he performs Rutles songs and other songs from his career such as his songs from the Bonzo Dog Doo-Dah Band. He also has played with Cliff Richard's backing band and with the Shadows.
