= Gordon Huntley =

British musician and steel guitar player

- Born: Thomas Gordon Huntley; 20 December 1925; Newbury, Berkshire, England
- Died: 7 March 1988 (aged 62)
- Genres: Country; folk; pop
- Instrument: Pedal steel guitar
- Years active: Late 1950s – 1980s

Thomas Gordon Huntley (20 December 1925 – 7 March 1988) was a British steel guitar player, best known for being a member of Matthews Southern Comfort. His early playing career was with the Hawaiian Serenaders in 1959, for whom he played a triple neck Fender lap steel guitar. He converted this to a pedal steel by adding an accelerator pedal from a tractor connected with bicycle brake cable. He formed the Black Stetson Boys in 1959 with John Derek, the two later playing together in Johnny and the Hounders (later to become the Flintlocks).

Around 1963, Huntley teamed up with Nigel Dennis (a Newbury solicitor) to manufacture Denley steel guitars (DENnis-huntLEY). The 1960s saw Huntley playing the "country" circuit, especially the USAF bases, with bands such as George Brown's Alabama Hayriders, the Saddletramps, Dougie Dee and the Dee Men.

In 1969, Huntley played as session musician on Keith Christmas's Stimulus album, and on Iain Matthews' debut album Matthews' Southern Comfort, subsequently becoming a member of the Matthews Southern Comfort band. In 1970, he played on the band's single "Woodstock", which reached No. 1 on the UK record charts on 31 October and remained there for 3 weeks. Also in 1970, Huntley played steel guitar on the track "Country Comfort" on Elton John's second album, Tumbleweed Connection.

Huntley was highly respected as a session musician and his steel sound was subsequently heard on recordings by artists including Elton John, Rod Stewart, Clodagh Rodgers, Barbara Dickson, the Pretty Things, Fairport Convention, and on the soundtrack of Cliff Richard's Take Me High.

In 1974, Huntley released his own album, Sleepwalk: The Romantic Sound of Gordon Huntley, with arrangements by Harry Robinson.

Huntley died on 7 March 1988 from cancer.
