= Amelia Earhart's Last Flight =

Song by David McEnery
- Published: 1939
- Songwriter: David McEnery

"Amelia Earhart's Last Flight" is a song written by "Red River Dave" McEnery shortly after Amelia Earhart's disappearance.

It was copyrighted in 1939, and was first performed by David McEnery on a pioneer television broadcast from the 1939 New York World's Fair. McEnery recorded it in 1941.

It has been covered by artists including Kinky Friedman, Ronnie Lane, the Greenbriar Boys, Country Gentlemen, the Phil Keaggy Band, and Plainsong. Saskatoon-based band The Heartstrings covered the song, and used the second line of the chorus as the title of their 2009 album Far Away in a Land That is Fair.
