= David McEnery =

American singer-songwriter

Background information
- Also known as: Red River Dave
- Born: David Largus McEnery; December 15, 1914; San Antonio, Texas, U.S.
- Died: January 15, 2002 (aged 87) San Antonio, Texas, U.S.
- Genre: Western music
- Occupations: Musician, songwriter
- Instruments: Vocals, guitar
- Years active: 1937–2002
- Labels: Decca Records; MGM Records; Savoy Records

David Largus McEnery (December 15, 1914 – January 15, 2002), often referred to professionally as Red River Dave, was an American musician, writer of topical songs, and painter. His two best-known songs are "Amelia Earhart's Last Flight" (a memorial tribute to the pilot following her disappearance) and "Ballad of Francis Powers" (his own lyrics set to the music of the World War II song "There's a Star-Spangled Banner Waving Somewhere").

== Biography ==
McEnery was born in December 1914 in San Antonio, Texas. He got the nickname "Red River Dave" because he enjoyed singing "Red River Valley" at Brackenridge High School in his hometown.

McEnery first appeared on radio at age 18, in 1932, for KABC in San Antonio. In 1936, he became "cattle whip and lariat champion" at a state competition. That same year, he broadcast a live singing performance from the Goodyear Blimp over CBS AM radio station WQAM in Miami.

McEnery's career really took off with his topical song "Amelia Earhart's Last Flight", broadcast in a pioneer television broadcast from the 1939 New York World's Fair, where his band entertained at the Swift Premium exhibit. He worked for radio station WOR (AM) in New York City. He was a radio personality in border radio for station XERF. From the 1940s, McEnery had a daily radio show for several years at station WOAI (AM) in his home town of San Antonio, where he set up a booking office for himself and his band.

During World War II, McEnery was briefly in the United States Army, from March through June 1943. Records indicate he was discharged for medical reasons after being admitted to hospital at Camp Croft, South Carolina.

McEnery was featured in several full-length westerns and short subjects as a singing cowboy including the Columbia Pictures feature Swing in the Saddle (1944), and the Universal Pictures featurettes Hidden Valley Days and Echo Ranch (both 1948). He also starred in 14 soundies, three-minute musical films shown in coin-operated "movie jukeboxes", and was the company's most prolific cowboy entertainer.

In 1947, columnist Lester Ketner of Boxoffice magazine asked McEnery about possibly running for political office, to which McEnery replied, "I'm gonna run for sheriff, just to keep outta jail."

McEnery became a disc jockey for WOAI in 1953, and also appeared on WOAI-TV. In November 1953, he bought a recording studio, Marathon Recording Company, in San Antonio.

In the latter part of his life, McEnery became a well-known painter of Texas landscapes and Western Americana themes, and was often known to paint the backs of his used guitars. He died in San Antonio in January 2002.

== Publications ==
- Red River Dave; Betty Ann Fisher (1939). Red River Dave Song Book: marvelous collection of cowboy, hill-billy, mountain and home songs, all originals. New York: Stasny Music Corporation.
- McEnery, Dave (c. 1940). Red River Dave's Louisiana Jamboree and Nashville Favorites. San Antonio, Texas: Red River Dave Music Company.

== Songs ==
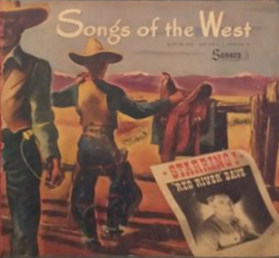
Album cover for Songs of the West by Red River Dave

McEnery was a prolific songwriter; his songs include the below. He also had songs that were recorded by Hank Snow and Tex Ritter.

- "Amelia Earhart's Last Flight" 1937
- "The Blind Boy's Dog" ("I'd Like To Give My Dog To Uncle Sam")
- "The Red Deck of Cards" 1954
- "Ballad Of Emmett Till"
- "The Ballad Of Francis Powers" 1960
- "Trial of Francis Powers" 1960
- "The Flight Of Apollo Eleven" 1969
- "The California Hippy Murders"
- "The Ballad Of Patty Hearst"
- "The Ballad of Three Mile Island" 1979
- "Atlanta's Black Children" 1981
- "The Pine-Tarred Bat, the Ballad of George Brett" 1983
- "The Clinging Lovers of Kenya" 1983
- "Night That Ronald Reagan Rode With Santa Claus" 1984
- "Shame is the Middle Name Of Exxon"
