= List of songs recorded by Jason Newsted =

Songs recorded by Jason Newsted
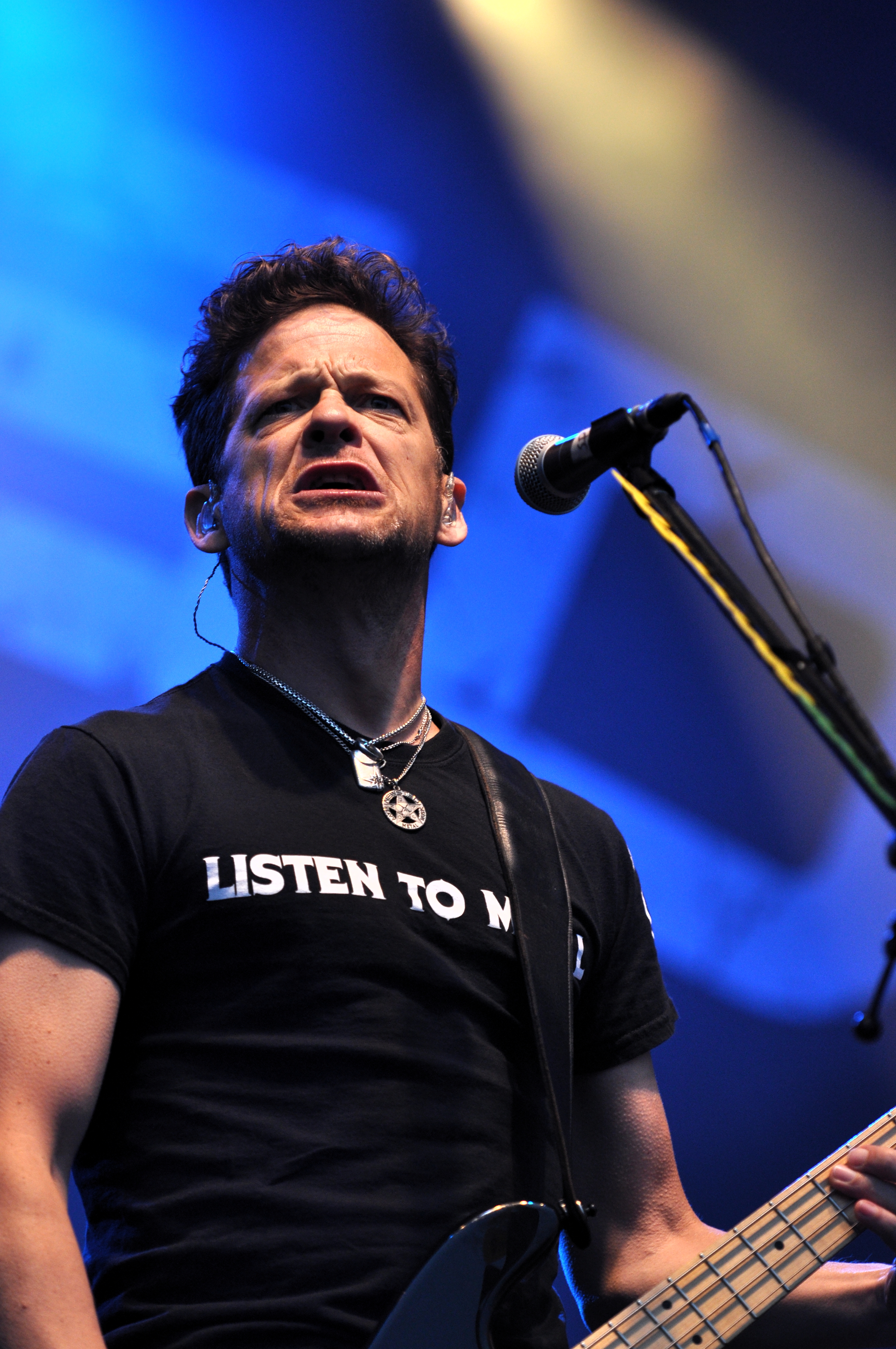
Breakdown by artist
Artist	No. songs
Metallica	145
Voivod	36
Papa Wheelie	20
Newsted	13
Echobrain	13
The Moss Brothers	12
Unkle	12
Rock Star Supernova	11
Flotsam and Jetsam	10
IR8 and Sexoturica	6
Gov't Mule	5
WhoCares	2
Sepultura	1

Throughout his career, musician Jason Newsted has made over 250 recordings, encompassing studio albums, live material and work for film soundtracks, cover albums and charity releases. Although he began his career as a member of the thrash metal group Flotsam and Jetsam, Newsted's work has primarily been with the band Metallica, with whom he played bass guitar between 1986 and 2001. During Newsted's tenure with the band, they produced four studio albums—1988's ...And Justice for All, 1991's Metallica, 1996's Load and 1997's Reload—as well as several supplementary releases. However, Newsted faced difficulty integrating with the group, and found little opportunity to add his music input; having only been given writing credit for only three Metallica songs during his tenure.

Frustrated by his "second-class citizen" status and having been forbidden to work on side projects, Newsted quit in 2001 to work with the band Echobrain. That band's self-titled debut was released in 2002, and featured an alternative metal style unlike Newsted's former work. That same year, Newsted appeared on albums by Papa Wheelie and southern rock band Gov't Mule, as well as becoming a full-time member of veteran Canadian thrash group Voivod. Newsted wrote and recorded three albums with the latter band: Voivod, Katorz and Infini. Since leaving the group, Newsted has been involved with several musical supergroups, releasing a charity double A-side single as part of WhoCares and starring in the television series Rock Star: Supernova, which led to the creation of an eponymous band. Newsted's other work has involved a cameo appearance on Sepultura's album Against playing instruments on Unkle's debut album Psyence Fiction, and releasing a split demo recording under the names of IR8 and Sexoturica.

In 2013, Newsted founded the self-titled band Newsted, who released the EP Metal in January 2013, and the full-length album Heavy Metal Music the following August. Newsted founded and operates the independent record label Chophouse Records, named for his home studio, and has issued several of his releases through the label since 2002.

== Songs ==
Key
†	Indicates single release

Song	Artist	Credit as writer(s)	Release	Year	Ref(s)
"2x4"	Metallica	James Hetfield; Lars Ulrich; Kirk Hammett	Load	1996	
"Above All"	Newsted	Jason Newsted	Heavy Metal Music	2013	
"Adrift"	Echobrain	Echobrain	Echobrain	2002	
"After All"	Voivod	Voivod	Katorz	2006	
"Ain't My Bitch"	Metallica	James Hetfield; Lars Ulrich	Load	1996	
"Ain't My Bitch"	Metallica	James Hetfield; Lars Ulrich	Cunning Stunts	1998	
"Alone"	IR8 and Sexoturica	IR8; Sexoturica	IR8 vs. Sexoturica	2003	
"Am I Evil?"	Metallica	Sean Harris; Brian Tatler	Live Shit: Binge & Purge	1993	
"Ampossible"	Newsted	Jason Newsted	Heavy Metal Music	2013	
"Anjali"	Echobrain	Echobrain	Strange Enjoyment	2002	
"...And Justice for All"	Metallica	James Hetfield; Lars Ulrich; Kirk Hammett	...And Justice for All	1988	
"...And Justice for All"	Metallica	James Hetfield; Lars Ulrich; Kirk Hammett	Six Feet Down Under	2010	
"...As the Crow Flies"	Newsted	Jason Newsted	Heavy Metal Music	2013	
"Astronomy"	Metallica	Joe Bouchard; Albert Bouchard; Sandy Pearlman	Garage Inc.	1998	
"Attitude"	Metallica	James Hetfield; Lars Ulrich	Reload	1997	
"Back on Black"	IR8 and Sexoturica	IR8; Sexoturica	IR8 vs. Sexoturica	2003	
"Bad Seed Jam/So What?"	Metallica	James Hetfield; Lars Ulrich; Kirk Hammett; Nick Kulmer; Chris Exall; Clive Blake	Cunning Stunts	1998	
"Bad Seed"	Metallica	James Hetfield; Lars Ulrich; Kirk Hammett	Reload	1997	
"Bass/Guitar Doodle"	Metallica	James Hetfield; Lars Ulrich; Kirk Hammett; Jason Newsted	Cunning Stunts	1998	
"Battery"	Metallica	James Hetfield; Lars Ulrich	S&M	1999	
"Be Yourself (and 5 Other Cliches)" †	Rock Star Supernova	Gilby Clarke; Butch Walker	Rock Star Supernova	2006	
"Better Than You"	Metallica	James Hetfield; Lars Ulrich	Reload	1997	
"Blackened"	Metallica	James Hetfield; Lars Ulrich; Jason Newsted	...And Justice for All	1988	
"Blame Us"	Voivod	Voivod; Denis Bélanger	Voivod	2003	
"Bleeding Me"	Metallica	James Hetfield; Lars Ulrich; Kirk Hammett	Load	1996	
"Bleeding Me"	Metallica	James Hetfield; Lars Ulrich; Kirk Hammett	S&M	1999	
"Bloodstain"	Unkle	Josh Davis; Alice Temple	Psyence Fiction	1998	
"Breadfan"	Metallica	Burke Shelley; Tony Bourge; Ray Phillips	"Harvester of Sorrow"	1988	
"The Call of Ktulu"	Metallica	James Hetfield; Lars Ulrich; Cliff Burton; Dave Mustaine	S&M	1999	
"Can't Bring Myself to Light This Fuse" †	Rock Star Supernova	Tommy Lee; Butch Walker; Scott Humphrey	Rock Star Supernova	2006	
"Carpe Diem Baby"	Metallica	James Hetfield; Lars Ulrich; Kirk Hammett	Reload	1997	
"Celestial Annihilation"	Unkle	Josh Davis	Psyence Fiction	1998	
"Chaos"	Unkle	Josh Davis	Psyence Fiction	1998	
"Colder World"	Echobrain	Echobrain	Echobrain	2002	
"Colossis"	IR8 and Sexoturica	IR8; Sexoturica	IR8 vs. Sexoturica	2003	
"Crash Course in Brain Surgery"	Metallica	Burke Shelley; Tony Bourge; Ray Phillips	The $5.98 E.P. - Garage Days Re-Revisited	1987	
"Creeping Death"	Metallica	James Hetfield; Lars Ulrich; Cliff Burton; Kirk Hammett	Live Shit: Binge & Purge	1993	
"Creeping Death"	Metallica	James Hetfield; Lars Ulrich; Cliff Burton; Kirk Hammett	Cunning Stunts	1998	
"Cryin' Shame"	Echobrain	Echobrain	Echobrain	2002	
"Cure Jam/Am I Evil? (Short Version)"	Metallica	James Hetfield; Lars Ulrich; Sean Harris; Brian Tatler	Cunning Stunts	1998	
"Cure"	Metallica	James Hetfield; Lars Ulrich	Load	1996	
"Damage Case"	Metallica	Eddie Clarke; Ian Kilmister; Phil Taylor; Mick Farren	"Hero of the Day"	1996	
"The Dead Parade"	Rock Star Supernova	Gilby Clarke; Butch Walker; Lukas Rossi	Rock Star Supernova	2006	
"Dead Soul at Sleep"	IR8 and Sexoturica	IR8; Sexoturica	IR8 vs. Sexoturica	2003	
"Deathproof"	Voivod	Denis Bélanger; Denis D'Amour; Michel Langevin; Jason Newsted	Infini	2009	
"Der Führer"	Flotsam and Jetsam	Eric A.K. Eric Carlson; Jason Newsted; Kelly David Smith	Doomsday for the Deceiver	1986	
"Desecrator"	Flotsam and Jetsam	Eric A.K. Eric Carlson; Jason Newsted; Kelly David Smith	Doomsday for the Deceiver	1986	
"Destroy After Reading"	Voivod	Denis Bélanger; Denis D'Amour; Michel Langevin; Jason Newsted	Infini	2009	
"Devil's Dance"	Metallica	James Hetfield; Lars Ulrich	Reload	1997	
"Devil's Dance"	Metallica	James Hetfield; Lars Ulrich	S&M	1999	
"Devil's Dance"	Metallica	James Hetfield; Lars Ulrich	Six Feet Down Under	2010	
"Die, Die My Darling" †	Metallica	Glenn Danzig	Garage Inc.	1998	
"Divine Sun"	Voivod	Voivod; Denis Bélanger	Voivod	2003	
"Dognation"	Voivod	Voivod	Katorz	2006	
"Don't Tread on Me"	Metallica	James Hetfield; Lars Ulrich	Metallica	1991	
"Doomsday for the Deceiver"	Flotsam and Jetsam	Eric A.K. Eric Carlson; Jason Newsted; Kelly David Smith	Doomsday for the Deceiver	1986	
"Dyers Eve"	Metallica	James Hetfield; Lars Ulrich; Kirk Hammett	...And Justice for All	1988	
"Earth Quakes"	The Moss Brothers	The Moss Brothers	Electricitation	1998	
"Earthache"	Voivod	Denis Bélanger; Denis D'Amour; Michel Langevin; Jason Newsted	Infini	2009	
"The Ecstasy of Gold"	Metallica	Ennio Morricone	S&M	1999	
"The Ecstasy of Gold/Enter Sandman"	Metallica	Ennio Morricone; James Hetfield; Lars Ulrich; Kirk Hammett	Live Shit: Binge & Purge	1993	
"Electricitation"	The Moss Brothers	The Moss Brothers	Electricitation	1998	
"Encore"	Papa Wheelie	Papa Wheelie	Live Lycanthropy	2002	
"Enter Sandman" †	Metallica	James Hetfield; Lars Ulrich; Kirk Hammett	Metallica	1991	
"Enter Sandman"	Metallica	James Hetfield; Lars Ulrich; Kirk Hammett	S&M	1999	
"Enter Sandman"	Metallica	James Hetfield; Lars Ulrich; Kirk Hammett	Cunning Stunts	1998	
"Eye of the Beholder" †	Metallica	James Hetfield; Lars Ulrich; Kirk Hammett	...And Justice for All	1988	
"Eye of the Beholder"	Metallica	James Hetfield; Lars Ulrich; Kirk Hammett	Six Feet Down Under	2010	
"Facing Up"	Voivod	Voivod; Denis Bélanger	Voivod	2003	
"Fade to Black"	Flotsam and Jetsam	Eric A.K. Eric Carlson; Michael Gilbert; Jason Newsted; Kelly David Smith	Doomsday for the Deceiver	1986	
"Fade to Black"	Metallica	James Hetfield; Lars Ulrich; Cliff Burton; Kirk Hammett	Live Shit: Binge & Purge	1993	
"Fade to Black"	Metallica	James Hetfield; Lars Ulrich; Cliff Burton; Kirk Hammett	Cunning Stunts	1998	
"The Feeling Is Over"	Echobrain	Echobrain	Echobrain	2002	
"Fire Face"	Papa Wheelie	Papa Wheelie	Unipsycho	2002	
"Fireface"	Papa Wheelie	Papa Wheelie	Live Lycanthropy	2002	
"Fixxxer"	Metallica	James Hetfield; Lars Ulrich; Kirk Hammett	Reload	1997	
"Flotzilla"	Flotsam and Jetsam	Eric A.K. Eric Carlson; Jason Newsted; Kelly David Smith	Doomsday for the Deceiver	1986	
"For Whom the Bell Tolls"	Metallica	James Hetfield; Lars Ulrich; Cliff Burton	Live Shit: Binge & Purge	1993	
"For Whom the Bell Tolls"	Metallica	James Hetfield; Lars Ulrich; Cliff Burton	Cunning Stunts	1998	
"For Whom the Bell Tolls"	Metallica	James Hetfield; Lars Ulrich; Cliff Burton	S&M	1999	
"The Four Horsemen"	Metallica	James Hetfield; Lars Ulrich; Dave Mustaine	Live Shit: Binge & Purge	1993	
"The Frayed Ends of Sanity"	Metallica	James Hetfield; Lars Ulrich; Kirk Hammett	...And Justice for All	1988	
"Free Speech for the Dumb"	Metallica	Garry Maloney; Cal Morris; Tony Roberts; Roy Wainwright	Garage Inc.	1998	
"From the Cave"	Voivod	Denis Bélanger; Denis D'Amour; Michel Langevin; Jason Newsted	Infini	2009	
"From This Place"	The Moss Brothers	The Moss Brothers	Electricitation	1998	
"Frustration"	The Moss Brothers	The Moss Brothers	Electricitation	1998	
"Fuel (Demo Version)"	Metallica	James Hetfield; Lars Ulrich; Kirk Hammett	Cunning Stunts	1998	
"Fuel" †	Metallica	James Hetfield; Lars Ulrich; Kirk Hammett	Reload	1997	
"Fuel"	Metallica	James Hetfield; Lars Ulrich; Kirk Hammett	S&M	1999	
"Fuel for Fire"	Metallica	James Hetfield; Lars Ulrich; Kirk Hammett	"The Memory Remains"	1997	
"Futureality"	Newsted	Jason Newsted	Heavy Metal Music	2013	
"Gasmask Revival"	Voivod	Voivod; Denis Bélanger	Voivod	2003	
"The Getaway"	Voivod	Voivod	Katorz	2006	
"Getting Ahead in the Lucrative Field of Artist Management"	Unkle	Josh Davis	Psyence Fiction	1998	
"Ghosts"	Echobrain	Echobrain	Echobrain	2002	
"Give It Back"	Papa Wheelie	Papa Wheelie	Live Lycanthropy	2002	
"Givin' It Back"	Papa Wheelie	Papa Wheelie	Unipsycho	2002	
"Global Warning"	Voivod	Denis Bélanger; Denis D'Amour; Michel Langevin; Jason Newsted	Infini	2009	
"God Phones"	Voivod	Denis Bélanger; Denis D'Amour; Michel Langevin; Jason Newsted	Infini	2009	
"The God That Failed"	Metallica	James Hetfield; Lars Ulrich	Metallica	1991	
"Godsnake"	Newsted	Newsted	Metal	2013	
"Guns Blazing (Drums of Death, Pt. 1)"	Unkle	Josh Davis; Kool G Rap	Psyence Fiction	1998	
"Hammerhead"	Flotsam and Jetsam	Eric A.K. Eric Carlson; Jason Newsted; Kelly David Smith	Doomsday for the Deceiver	1986	
"Harvester of Sorrow" †	Metallica	James Hetfield; Lars Ulrich	...And Justice for All	1988	
"Harvester of Sorrow"	Metallica	James Hetfield; Lars Ulrich	Live Shit: Binge & Purge	1993	
"Hatred Aside"	Sepultura	Igor Cavalera; Derrick Green; Paulo Jr. Andreas Kisser; Jason Newsted	Against	1998	
"Head First"	Papa Wheelie	Papa Wheelie	Unipsycho	2002	
"Headspin" †	Rock Star Supernova	Lukas Rossi; Dominic Cifarelli	Rock Star Supernova	2006	
"Heaven Got Overpopulated"	The Moss Brothers	The Moss Brothers	Electricitation	1998	
"Helpless"	Metallica	Sean Harris; Brian Tatler	The $5.98 E.P. - Garage Days Re-Revisited	1987	
"Hero of the Day" †	Metallica	James Hetfield; Lars Ulrich; Kirk Hammett	Load	1996	
"Hero of the Day"	Metallica	James Hetfield; Lars Ulrich; Kirk Hammett	Cunning Stunts	1998	
"Hero of the Day"	Metallica	James Hetfield; Lars Ulrich; Kirk Hammett	S&M	1999	
"Heroic Dose"	Newsted	Jason Newsted	Heavy Metal Music	2013	
"Highway 44"	Echobrain	Echobrain; Andrew Gomez	Echobrain	2002	
"His Scales Are His Pride"	Papa Wheelie	Papa Wheelie	Live Lycanthropy	2002	
"Holier Than Thou"	Metallica	James Hetfield; Lars Ulrich	Metallica	1991	
"Holy Water" †	WhoCares	Ian Gillan; Steve Morris	"Out of My Mind" / "Holy Water"	2011	
"The House That Jack Built"	Metallica	James Hetfield; Lars Ulrich; Kirk Hammett	Load	1996	
"I Disappear (Instrumental)"	Metallica	James Hetfield; Lars Ulrich	"I Disappear"	2000	
"I Disappear" †	Metallica	James Hetfield; Lars Ulrich	Music from and Inspired by Mission: Impossible 2	2000	
"I Don't Wanna Wake Up"	Voivod	Voivod; Denis Bélanger	Voivod	2003	
"I Drank You"	Echobrain	Echobrain	Echobrain	2002	
"In Orbit"	Voivod	Denis Bélanger; Denis D'Amour; Michel Langevin; Jason Newsted	Infini	2009	
"Invisible Planet"	Voivod	Voivod; Denis Bélanger	Voivod	2003	
"Iron Tears"	Flotsam and Jetsam	Eric A.K. Eric Carlson; Jason Newsted; Kelly David Smith	Doomsday for the Deceiver	1986	
"It's All Love" †	Rock Star Supernova	Tommy Lee; Butch Walker; Scott Humphrey	Rock Star Supernova	2006	
"It's Electric"	Metallica	Sean Harris; Brian Tatler	Garage Inc.	1998	
"It's On"	Rock Star Supernova	Tommy Lee; Butch Walker; Scott Humphrey	Rock Star Supernova	2006	
"Justice Medley"	Metallica	James Hetfield; Lars Ulrich; Kirk Hammett; Jason Newsted	Live Shit: Binge & Purge	1993	
"Keep Me Alive"	Echobrain	Echobrain	Echobrain	2002	
"Kill/Ride Medley"	Metallica	James Hetfield; Lars Ulrich; Cliff Burton; Dave Mustaine	Cunning Stunts	1998	
"Killing Time"	Metallica	Vivian Campbell; Trevor Fleming; Raymond Haller; Davy Bates	"The Unforgiven"	1991	
"Kindevillusion"	Newsted	Jason Newsted	Heavy Metal Music	2013	
"King Nothing" †	Metallica	James Hetfield; Lars Ulrich; Kirk Hammett	Load	1996	
"King Nothing"	Metallica	James Hetfield; Lars Ulrich; Kirk Hammett	Cunning Stunts	1998	
"King of the Underdogs"	Newsted	Newsted	Metal	2013	
"The Knock (Drums of Death Pt. 2)"	Unkle	Josh Davis	Psyence Fiction	1998	
"Krap Radio"	Voivod	Denis Bélanger; Denis D'Amour; Michel Langevin; Jason Newsted	Infini	2009	
"Last Caress"	Metallica	Glenn Danzig	Live Shit: Binge & Purge	1993	
"Last Caress/Green Hell"	Metallica	Glenn Danzig	The $5.98 E.P. - Garage Days Re-Revisited	1987	
"Lay Low"	Papa Wheelie	Papa Wheelie	Unipsycho	2002	
"Leave the Lights On"	Rock Star Supernova	Tommy Lee; Butch Walker; Scott Humphrey	Rock Star Supernova	2006	
"Leper Messiah Jam/Last Caress"	Metallica	James Hetfield; Lars Ulrich; Glenn Danzig	Cunning Stunts	1998	
"Les Cigares Volants"	Voivod	Voivod; Denis Bélanger	Voivod	2003	
"Lonely Soul"	Unkle	Richard Ashcroft; Josh Davis; Wil Malone	Psyence Fiction	1998	
"Long Time Dead"	Newsted	Jason Newsted	Heavy Metal Music	2013	
"Loverman"	Metallica	Nick Cave	Garage Inc.	1998	
"Low Man's Lyric (Acoustic)"	Metallica	James Hetfield; Lars Ulrich	Six Feet Down Under	2010	
"Low Man's Lyric"	Metallica	James Hetfield; Lars Ulrich	Reload	1997	
"Make No Mistake... This Is the Take"	Rock Star Supernova	Tommy Lee; Butch Walker; Scott Humphrey	Rock Star Supernova	2006	
"Mama Said" †	Metallica	James Hetfield; Lars Ulrich	Load	1996	
"Master of Puppets (Short Version)"	Metallica	James Hetfield; Lars Ulrich; Cliff Burton; Kirk Hammett	Cunning Stunts	1998	
"Master of Puppets"	Metallica	James Hetfield; Lars Ulrich; Cliff Burton; Kirk Hammett	Live Shit: Binge & Purge	1993	
"Master of Puppets"	Metallica	James Hetfield; Lars Ulrich; Cliff Burton; Kirk Hammett	S&M	1999	
"The Memory Remains" †	Metallica	James Hetfield; Lars Ulrich	Reload	1997	
"The Memory Remains"	Metallica	James Hetfield; Lars Ulrich	S&M	1999	
"Mercyful Fate"	Metallica	King Diamond; Hank Shermann	Garage Inc.	1998	
"Metal Shock"	Flotsam and Jetsam	Eric A.K. Eric Carlson; Jason Newsted; Kelly David Smith	Doomsday for the Deceiver	1986	
"The More I See"	Metallica	Garry Maloney; Cal Morris; Peter Purtill; Roy Wainwright	Garage Inc.	1998	
"Morpheus"	Voivod	Denis Bélanger; Denis D'Amour; Michel Langevin; Jason Newsted	Infini	2009	
"Motorbreath"	Metallica	James Hetfield	Live Shit: Binge & Purge	1993	
"Motorbreath"	Metallica	James Hetfield	Cunning Stunts	1998	
"Mr. Clean"	Voivod	Voivod	Katorz	2006	
"The Multiverse"	Voivod	Voivod; Denis Bélanger	Voivod	2003	
"My Friend of Misery"	Metallica	James Hetfield; Lars Ulrich; Jason Newsted	Metallica	1991	
"Never the Liar"	Papa Wheelie	Papa Wheelie	Unipsycho	2002	
"No Angels"	Voivod	Voivod	Katorz	2006	
"No Leaf Clover" †	Metallica	James Hetfield; Lars Ulrich	S&M	1999	
"Nocturnus"	Newsted	Jason Newsted	Heavy Metal Music	2013	
"Nothing Else Matters" †	Metallica	James Hetfield; Lars Ulrich	Metallica	1991	
"Nothing Else Matters"	Metallica	James Hetfield; Lars Ulrich	Live Shit: Binge & Purge	1993	
"Nothing Else Matters"	Metallica	James Hetfield; Lars Ulrich	Cunning Stunts	1998	
"Nothing Else Matters" †	Metallica	James Hetfield; Lars Ulrich	S&M	1999	
"Nothing"	IR8 and Sexoturica	IR8; Sexoturica	IR8 vs. Sexoturica	2003	
"Nursery Rhyme/Breather"	Unkle	Josh Davis	Psyence Fiction	1998	
"Odds & Frauds"	Voivod	Voivod	Katorz	2006	
"Of Wolf and Man"	Metallica	James Hetfield; Lars Ulrich; Kirk Hammett	Metallica	1991	
"Of Wolf and Man"	Metallica	James Hetfield; Lars Ulrich; Kirk Hammett	Live Shit: Binge & Purge	1993	
"Of Wolf and Man"	Metallica	James Hetfield; Lars Ulrich; Kirk Hammett	S&M	1999	
"Off the Charts"	The Moss Brothers	The Moss Brothers	Electricitation	1998	
"On & On"	Papa Wheelie	Papa Wheelie	Unipsycho	2002	
"On & On"	Papa Wheelie	Papa Wheelie	Live Lycanthropy	2002	
"One" †	Metallica	James Hetfield; Lars Ulrich	...And Justice for All	1988	
"One"	Metallica	James Hetfield; Lars Ulrich	Live Shit: Binge & Purge	1993	
"One"	Metallica	James Hetfield; Lars Ulrich	Cunning Stunts	1998	
"One"	Metallica	James Hetfield; Lars Ulrich	S&M	1999	
"Out of My Mind" †	WhoCares	Ian Gillan; Tony Iommi	"Out of My Mind" / "Holy Water"	2011	
"Out of School Anti-Blues"	The Moss Brothers	The Moss Brothers	Electricitation	1998	
"The Outlaw Torn"	Metallica	James Hetfield; Lars Ulrich	Load	1996	
"The Outlaw Torn"	Metallica	James Hetfield; Lars Ulrich	S&M	1999	
"Outro"	Unkle	Josh Davis	Psyence Fiction	1998	
"Overkill"	Metallica	Eddie Clarke; Ian Kilmister; Phil Taylor	"Hero of the Day"	1996	
"Polaroids"	Voivod	Voivod	Katorz	2006	
"Poor Twisted Me"	Metallica	James Hetfield; Lars Ulrich	Load	1996	
"The Prince"	Metallica	Sean Harris; Brian Tatler	"Harvester of Sorrow"	1988	
"Prince Charming"	Metallica	James Hetfield; Lars Ulrich	Reload	1997	
"A Promise Is a Promise"	The Moss Brothers	The Moss Brothers	Electricitation	1998	
"Psychomonkey"	The Moss Brothers	The Moss Brothers	Electricitation	1998	
"Pyramidome"	Voivod	Denis Bélanger; Denis D'Amour; Michel Langevin; Jason Newsted	Infini	2009	
"Rabbit in Your Headlights"	Unkle	Josh Davis; Thom Yorke	Psyence Fiction	1998	
"Reactor"	Voivod	Voivod; Denis Bélanger	Voivod	2003	
"Real Again?"	Voivod	Voivod; Denis Bélanger	Voivod	2003	
"The Real Me"	Papa Wheelie	Papa Wheelie	Unipsycho	2002	
"The Real Me"	Papa Wheelie	Papa Wheelie	Live Lycanthropy	2002	
"Rebel Robot"	Voivod	Voivod; Denis Bélanger	Voivod	2003	
"Red My Mind"	Voivod	Voivod	Katorz	2006	
"Ronnie"	Metallica	James Hetfield; Lars Ulrich	Load	1996	
"A Room with a V.U."	Voivod	Denis Bélanger; Denis D'Amour; Michel Langevin; Jason Newsted	Infini	2009	
"Sabbra Cadabra"	Metallica	Ozzy Osbourne; Tony Iommi; Geezer Butler; Bill Ward	Garage Inc.	1998	
"Sad but True" †	Metallica	James Hetfield; Lars Ulrich	Metallica	1991	
"Sad but True"	Metallica	James Hetfield; Lars Ulrich	Live Shit: Binge & Purge	1993	
"Sad but True"	Metallica	James Hetfield; Lars Ulrich	Cunning Stunts	1998	
"Sad but True"	Metallica	James Hetfield; Lars Ulrich	S&M	1999	
"Seek & Destroy"	Metallica	James Hetfield; Lars Ulrich	Live Shit: Binge & Purge	1993	
"She Took an Axe"	Flotsam and Jetsam	Eric A.K. Eric Carlson; Jason Newsted; Kelly David Smith	Doomsday for the Deceiver	1986	
"Shifter"	Papa Wheelie	Papa Wheelie	Unipsycho	2002	
"The Shortest Straw"	Metallica	James Hetfield; Lars Ulrich	...And Justice for All	1988	
"Silly Clones"	Voivod	Voivod	Katorz	2006	
"Sink Like Stone"	Papa Wheelie	Papa Wheelie	Live Lycanthropy	2002	
"Skyscraper"	Newsted	Newsted	Metal	2013	
"Slither"	Metallica	James Hetfield; Lars Ulrich; Kirk Hammett	Reload	1997	
"The Small Hours"	Metallica	John Mortimer	The $5.98 E.P. - Garage Days Re-Revisited	1987	
"So What?"	Metallica	Nick Kulmer; Chris Exall; Clive Blake	"The Unforgiven"	1991	
"So What?/Battery"	Metallica	Nick Kulmer; Chris Exall; Clive Blake; James Hetfield; Lars Ulrich	Live Shit: Binge & Purge	1993	
"Social Disgrace"	Rock Star Supernova	Tommy Lee; Butch Walker; Scott Humphrey; Lukas Rossi	Rock Star Supernova	2006	
"Soldierhead"	Newsted	Newsted	Metal	2013	
"Solos (Bass/Guitar)"	Metallica	Jason Newsted; Kirk Hammett	Live Shit: Binge & Purge	1993	
"Spoonfed"	Echobrain	Echobrain	Echobrain	2002	
"Spoonfed"	Echobrain	Echobrain	Strange Enjoyment	2002	
"Stone Cold Crazy"	Metallica	Freddie Mercury; Brian May; Roger Taylor; John Deacon	"Enter Sandman"	1991	
"Stone Cold Crazy"	Metallica	Freddie Mercury; Brian May; Roger Taylor; John Deacon	Live Shit: Binge & Purge	1993	
"Stone Dead Forever"	Metallica	Eddie Clarke; Ian Kilmister; Phil Taylor	"Hero of the Day"	1996	
"Strange and Ironic"	Voivod	Voivod; Denis Bélanger	Voivod	2003	
"The Struggle Within"	Metallica	James Hetfield; Lars Ulrich	Metallica	1991	
"Suckerpunch"	Echobrain	Echobrain	Echobrain	2002	
"Sweet Leaf"	Gov't Mule	Ozzy Osbourne; Tony Iommi; Geezer Butler; Bill Ward	The Deepest End, Live in Concert	2003	
"Sweet Summer"	Echobrain	Echobrain	Strange Enjoyment	2002	
"The Telephone Song"	Papa Wheelie	Papa Wheelie	Live Lycanthropy	2002	
"The Thing That Should Not Be"	Metallica	James Hetfield; Lars Ulrich; Kirk Hammett	S&M	1999	
"Thorazine Shuffle"	Gov't Mule	Warren Haynes; Matt Abts	The Deepest End, Live in Concert	2003	
"Thorn Within"	Metallica	James Hetfield; Lars Ulrich; Kirk Hammett	Load	1996	
"Three-Hour Day"	The Moss Brothers	The Moss Brothers	Electricitation	1998	
"Through the Never"	Metallica	James Hetfield; Lars Ulrich; Kirk Hammett	Metallica	1991	
"Through the Never"	Metallica	James Hetfield; Lars Ulrich; Kirk Hammett	Live Shit: Binge & Purge	1993	
"Through the Never"	Metallica	James Hetfield; Lars Ulrich; Kirk Hammett	Six Feet Down Under	2010	
"Through the Night"	Papa Wheelie	Papa Wheelie	Unipsycho	2002	
"To Live Is to Die"	Metallica	James Hetfield; Lars Ulrich; Cliff Burton	...And Justice for All	1988	
"Too Late Too Late"	Metallica	Eddie Clarke; Ian Kilmister; Phil Taylor	"Hero of the Day"	1996	
"Transfiguration"	Papa Wheelie	Papa Wheelie	Live Lycanthropy	2002	
"Treasure Chase"	Voivod	Denis Bélanger; Denis D'Amour; Michel Langevin; Jason Newsted	Infini	2009	
"Trying Not to Fall"	Gov't Mule	Warren Haynes; Danny Louis	The Deep End, Volume 2	2002	
"Trying Not to Fall"	Gov't Mule	Warren Haynes; Danny Louis	The Deepest End, Live in Concert	2003	
"Tuesday's Gone"	Metallica	Ronnie Van Zant; Gary Rossington; Allen Collins	Garage Inc.	1998	
"Turn the Page" †	Metallica	Bob Seger	Garage Inc.	1998	
"TV Crisis"	The Moss Brothers	The Moss Brothers	Electricitation	1998	
"Twisted Tail of the Comet"	Newsted	Jason Newsted	Heavy Metal Music	2013	
"U.L.S.W."	Flotsam and Jetsam	Eric A.K. Eric Carlson; Jason Newsted; Kelly David Smith	Doomsday for the Deceiver	1986	
"Underdog"	Rock Star Supernova	Gilby Clarke; Butch Walker; Lukas Rossi	Rock Star Supernova	2006	
"The Unforgiven" †	Metallica	James Hetfield; Lars Ulrich; Kirk Hammett	Metallica	1991	
"The Unforgiven"	Metallica	James Hetfield; Lars Ulrich; Kirk Hammett	Live Shit: Binge & Purge	1993	
"The Unforgiven"	Metallica	James Hetfield; Lars Ulrich; Kirk Hammett	Six Feet Down Under	2010	
"The Unforgiven II" †	Metallica	James Hetfield; Lars Ulrich; Kirk Hammett	Reload	1997	
"Unipsycho"	Papa Wheelie	Papa Wheelie	Unipsycho	2002	
"Unipsycho"	Papa Wheelie	Papa Wheelie	Live Lycanthropy	2002	
"UNKLE (Main Title Theme)"	Unkle	Josh Davis; Alice Temple	Psyence Fiction	1998	
"Unreal"	Unkle	Josh Davis; Jules Blattner Group	Psyence Fiction	1998	
"Until It Sleeps" †	Metallica	James Hetfield; Lars Ulrich	Load	1996	
"Until It Sleeps"	Metallica	James Hetfield; Lars Ulrich	Cunning Stunts	1998	
"Until It Sleeps"	Metallica	James Hetfield; Lars Ulrich	S&M	1999	
"Valentine"	Rock Star Supernova	Gilby Clarke; Butch Walker; Lukas Rossi	Rock Star Supernova	2006	
"Volcano"	Voivod	Denis Bélanger; Denis D'Amour; Michel Langevin; Jason Newsted	Infini	2009	
"The Wait"	Metallica	Jaz Coleman; Geordie Walker; Martin Glover; Paul Ferguson	The $5.98 E.P. - Garage Days Re-Revisited	1987	
"War Pigs"	Gov't Mule	Ozzy Osbourne; Tony Iommi; Geezer Butler; Bill Ward	The Deepest End, Live in Concert	2003	
"Wasting My Hate"	Metallica	James Hetfield; Lars Ulrich; Kirk Hammett	Load	1996	
"We Carry On"	Voivod	Voivod; Denis Bélanger	Voivod	2003	
"Welcome Home (Sanitarium)"	Metallica	James Hetfield; Lars Ulrich; Kirk Hammett	Live Shit: Binge & Purge	1993	
"Where the Wild Things Are"	Metallica	James Hetfield; Lars Ulrich; Jason Newsted	Reload	1997	
"Wherever I May Roam" †	Metallica	James Hetfield; Lars Ulrich	Metallica	1991	
"Wherever I May Roam"	Metallica	James Hetfield; Lars Ulrich	Live Shit: Binge & Purge	1993	
"Wherever I May Roam"	Metallica	James Hetfield; Lars Ulrich	Cunning Stunts	1998	
"Wherever I May Roam"	Metallica	James Hetfield; Lars Ulrich	S&M	1999	
"Whiner"	The Moss Brothers	The Moss Brothers	Electricitation	1998	
"Whiplash"	Metallica	James Hetfield; Lars Ulrich	Live Shit: Binge & Purge	1993	
"Whiskey in the Jar" †	Metallica	Traditional; Eric Bell; Brian Downey; Phil Lynott	Garage Inc.	1998	
"The X-Stream"	Voivod	Voivod	Katorz	2006	
"Zone of Death"	IR8 and Sexoturica	IR8; Sexoturica	IR8 vs. Sexoturica	2003	
"−Human"	Metallica	James Hetfield; Lars Ulrich	S&M	1999	

== Footnotes ==
=== Album notes ===
- Doomsday for the Deceiver (Media notes). Flotsam and Jetsam. Metal Blade Records. 1986.
- The $5.98 E.P. - Garage Days Re-Revisited (Media notes). Metallica. Elektra Records, Vertigo Records. 1987.
- ...And Justice for All (Media notes). Metallica. Elektra Records, Vertigo Records. 1988.
- Metallica (Media notes). Metallica. Elektra Records, Vertigo Records. 1991.
- Live Shit: Binge & Purge (Media notes). Metallica. Elektra Records, Vertigo Records. 1993.
- Load (Media notes). Metallica. Elektra Records, Vertigo Records. 1996.
- Reload (Media notes). Metallica. Elektra Records, Vertigo Records. 1997.
- Against (Media notes). Sepultura. Roadrunner Records. 1998.
- Garage Inc (Media notes). Metallica. Elektra Records, Sony Music, Vertigo Records. 1999.
- Psyence Fiction (Media notes). Unkle. Mo' Wax. 1998.
- S&M (Media notes). Metallica. Elektra Records, Vertigo Records. 1999.
- Music from and Inspired by Mission: Impossible 2 (Media notes). Various. Hollywood Records. 2000.
- Electricitation (Media notes). The Moss Brothers. Marshall Lamm Recording. 2001.
- The Deep End, Volume 2 (Media notes). Gov't Mule. ATO Records. 2002.
- Echobrain (Media notes). Echobrain. Surfdog Records. 2002.
- IR8 vs. Sexoturica (Media notes). IR8 and Sexoturica. Chophouse Records. 2002.
- Live Lycanthropy (Media notes). Papa Wheelie. Chophouse Records. 2002.
- Strange Enjoyment (Media notes). Echobrain. Surfdog Records. 2002.
- Unipsycho (Media notes). Papa Wheelie. Chophouse Records. 2002.
- Voivod (Media notes). Voivod. Chophouse Records. 2002.
- The Deepest End, Live in Concert (Media notes). Gov't Mule. ATO Records. 2003.
- Katorz (Media notes). Voivod. The End Records, Nuclear Blast. 2006.
- Rock Star Supernova (Media notes). Rock Star Supernova. Burnett Records, The End Records. 2006.
- Infini (Media notes). Voivod. Relapse Records. 2009.
- Six Feet Down Under (Media notes). Metallica. Universal Music Group. 2010.
- Metal (Media notes). Newsted. Chophouse Records. 2013.
- Heavy Metal Music (Media notes). Newsted. Chophouse Records. 2013.

=== Single notes ===
- "Harvester of Sorrow" (Single notes). Metallica. Elektra Records, Vertigo Records. 1988.
- "Enter Sandman" (Single notes). Metallica. Elektra Records, Vertigo Records. 1991.
- "The Unforgiven" (Single notes). Metallica. Elektra Records, Vertigo Records. 1991.
- "Hero of the Day" (Single notes). Metallica. Elektra Records, Vertigo Records. 1996.
- "The Memory Remains" (Single notes). Metallica. Elektra Records, Vertigo Records. 1996.
- "I Disappear" (Single notes). Metallica. Warner Bros. Records, Hollywood Records. 2000.
- "Out of My Mind" / "Holy Water" (Single notes). WhoCares. Ear Music, Eagle Rock Entertainment. 2011.

=== Other references ===
- "Jason Newsted's Official Website – Newsted Heavy Metal". Jason Newsted. Archived from the original on January 21, 2013.
- Metallica (1998). Cunning Stunts (Videotape). Elektra Entertainment.
- Berlinger, Joe (2004). Metallica: This Monster Lives. Saint Martin's Press Inc. ISBN 978-0-312-33311-9.
