= Voivod discography =

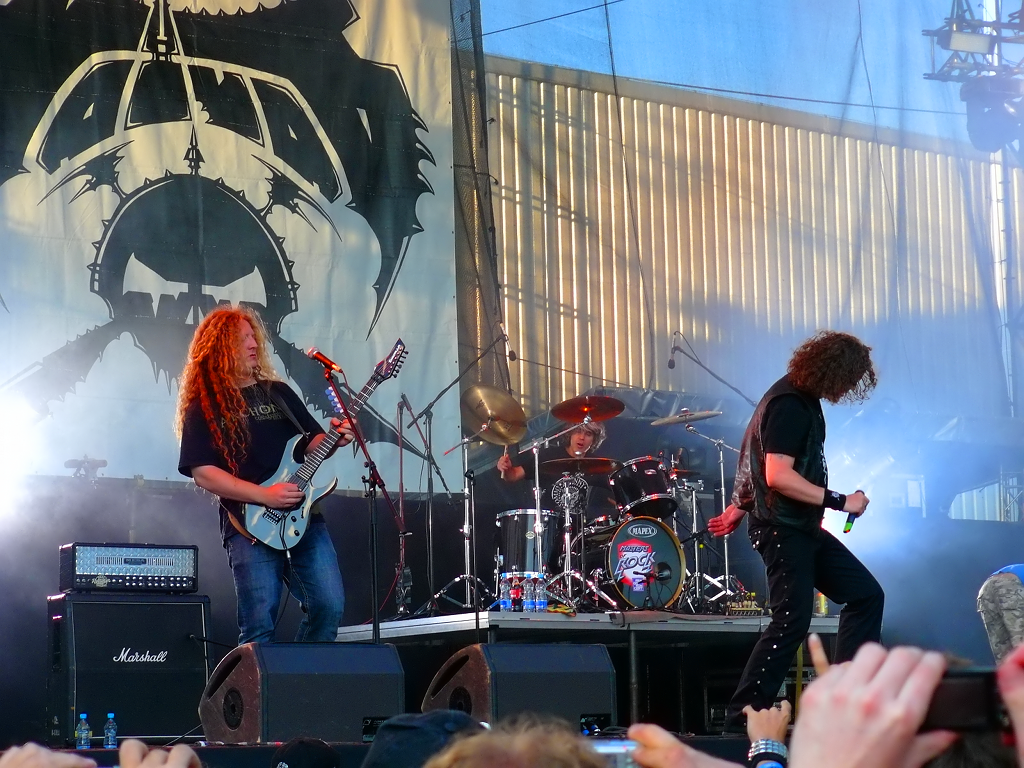
- Studio albums: 15
- Extended plays: 5
- Live albums: 3
- Compilation albums: 3
- Music videos: 16

The following is a comprehensive discography of the Canadian heavy metal band Voivod.

== Albums ==
=== Studio albums ===
| Year | Album details |
|---|---|
| 1984 | War and Pain: Released: 1984; Label: Metal Blade Records |
| 1986 | Rrröööaaarrr: Released: 1986; Label: Noise Records |
| 1987 | Killing Technology: Released: 1987; Label: Noise Records |
| 1988 | Dimension Hatröss: Released: 1988; Label: Noise Records |
| 1989 | Nothingface: Released: 1989; Label: Mechanic Records |
| 1991 | Angel Rat: Released: 1991; Label: Mechanic Records |
| 1993 | The Outer Limits: Released: 1993; Label: Mechanic Records |
| 1995 | Negatron: Released: 1995; Label: Mausoleum Records |
| 1997 | Phobos: Released: 1997; Label: Hypnotic Records |
| 2003 | Voivod: Released: 2003; Label: Chophouse Records |
| 2006 | Katorz: Released: 2006; Label: The End Records |
| 2009 | Infini: Released: 2009; Label: Relapse Records |
| 2013 | Target Earth: Released: 2013; Label: Century Media Records |
| 2018 | The Wake: Released: 2018; Label: Century Media Records |
| 2022 | Synchro Anarchy: Released: February 11, 2022; Label: Century Media Records |
| 2023 | Morgöth Tales: Released: July 21, 2023; Label: Century Media Records |

=== Live albums ===
- Voivod Lives (2000)
- Warriors of Ice (2011)
- Live at Roadburn (2011)
- Lost Machine – Live (2020)
- Live à St-Romuald (bootleg) (2023)
- Nothing Left - 1990 North American Tour (2024)
- Symphonique (2026)

=== Compilation albums ===
- The Best of Voivod (1992)
- Kronik (1998)
- To the Death 84 (2011)
- Build Your Weapons: The Very Best of the Noise Years 1986-1988 (2017)

=== EPs ===
- Thrashing Rage (1986)
- Cockroaches (1987)
- Angel Rat Sampler (1991)
- Live @ Musiqueplus (2000)
- Post Society (2016)
- The End of Dormancy (2020)

=== Demos ===
- Anachronism (1983)
- To the Death (1984)
- Morgoth Invasion (1984)
- Zeche Bochum (1986)
- No Speed Limit Weekend (1986)
- Live à Bruxelles (1987)
- Dimension Hatröss Demos (1987)
- Spectrum (1987)
- Nothingface Demos (1988)
- A Flawless Structure? (1988)
- Live at the Paradise (1990)
- Angel Rat Demos (1991)
- Negatron Demos (1994)
- Klubben Stockholm (1999)
- 2001 Album Demo (2001)
- Katorz Demos (2004)
- Alveol, an Angel Rat Demo (2022)
- Periscope, Nothingface This (2023)
- Commotion, Rrröööaaarrr Rough Mix Demo (2023)
- Specimen, The Outer Limits Demo (2024)
- Latitude, Dimension Hatross Demo (2024)

=== DVDs ===
- D-V-O-D-1 (2005)
- Tatsumaki: Voivod in Japan (2008)

=== Music videos ===
- Voivod (1984)
- Ripping Headaches (1986)
- Ravenous Medicine (1987)
- Tribal Convictions (1988)
- Psychic Vacuum (1988)
- Astronomy Domine (1989)
- Clouds in My House (1991)
- Insect (1995)
- The Tower (1997)
- We Carry On (2003)
- Mechanical Mind (2013)
- Target Earth (2013)
- Kluskap O'Kom (2013)
- We Are Connected (2015)
- Post Society (2016)
- Obsolete Beings (2018)
- Always Moving (2018)
- Iconspiracy (2018)
- The End Of Dormancy (Metal Section) (2020)
- Planet Eaters (2021)
- Synchro Anarchy (2022)
- Sleeves Off (2022)
- Quest For Nothing (2022)
- Nuage Fractal (Version 2023) (2023)
- Chaotic Harmony (Mystic Festival 2023 Anthem) (2023)
- Morgöth Tales (2023)
- Fix My Heart (Version 2023) (2023)
- Condemned To The Gallows (Version 2023) (2026)
