= Target Earth (album) =

Studio album by Voivod
- Released: January 22, 2013
- Recorded: 2010–2012
- Studio: Wild Studio, Saint-Zénon and Studio Plateau, Montreal, Quebec, Canada
- Genre: Progressive metal; thrash metal
- Length: 56:35
- Label: Century Media; Avalon (Japan)
- Producer: Voivod

Voivod chronology
Infini (2009)	Target Earth (2013)	Post Society (2016)

Singles from Target Earth
- 1. "Mechanical Mind" Released: 9 October 2012; 2. "Kluskap 'O Kom" Released: 19 October 2013; 3. "Target Earth" Released: 18 July 2013

Target Earth is the thirteenth studio album, and the sixteenth release overall, by the Canadian heavy metal band Voivod, which was released on January 22, 2013. This is the first Voivod studio album to feature Daniel Mongrain on guitar (replacing the late Denis D'Amour) and the only one since 1991's Angel Rat with Jean-Yves Thériault on bass.

== Background ==
After the 2005 death of Denis "Piggy" D'Amour, Voivod created two albums to realize the song ideas that he had left behind. With that material having been transformed into songs (as heard on Katorz and Infini), Voivod did not know what its future would involve. However, the band eventually decided to continue provided that the band, according to Michel "Away" Langevin, could "preserve the Voivod essence" and keep "Piggy's spirit intact."

The main songwriters on Target Earth were Jean-Yves "Blacky" Theriault, in his first songwriting credit with Voivod since 1991, and Daniel "Chewy" Mongrain, who replaced Piggy. As Langevin explained, Mongrain's role was both challenging and natural: "He [Mongrain] had to think from his point of view how Voivod should sound like nowadays...He learned to play guitar listening to Voivod, and he knows all the albums, he's a fan of all the eras, so it feels very natural for him to write Voivodian material."

Mongrain, a long-time fan of Voivod, was openly reverent about the role that he would play in succeeding Piggy as the guitarist for the band.

I started off thinking 'What would Piggy do with this part?' or 'What would Piggy write?' and I ultimately let go of that and let the essence of Voivod take over. At the beginning I was pretty stressed but after a while, it came very naturally for me. Voivod's been my favorite band since I was 11 years old. I've listened to them more than any other band in my life! I realized I don't want to copy Piggy. Piggy's unique. He's a unique musician. A unique human being. Piggy was a genius. I cannot be Piggy, I can only be the Voivod fan I am doing my best to write Voivod music that I can. This is what Voivod sounds like from my perspective of what I think a new Voivod album could and should sound like.

Part of realizing that distinctive sound involved breaking down Piggy's approach into its constituent elements, according to Mongrain. Mongrain specifically referenced the signature chords of King Crimson as giving Voivod its "color". "Piggy was a big progressive music fan," Mongrain said. "These chords are the most dissonant you can get and in Voivod, Piggy would throw them everywhere. It has that crazy, chaotic, end-of-the-world, post-nuclear vibe that's really associated with Voivod now." Langevin also specifically references the "progressive thrash metal" sound of Target Earth, which he contrasts to the "stoner-punk-metal" approach of the previous three albums that Voivod completed with bassist Jason Newsted.

== Reception ==
Professional ratings
Aggregate scores
Source	Rating
Metacritic	84/100
Review scores
Source	Rating
AllMusic	4/5 stars
Blabbermouth.net	8/10
Brave Words & Bloody Knuckles	8.5/10
Decibel	8/10
Exclaim!	9/10
Kerrang!	4/5 stars
PopMatters	8/10
Rock Hard	8.5/10
Spin	8/10
Sputnikmusic	4/5

Target Earth has received generally positive reviews, including a metascore of 84/100 on Metacritic based on 7 critics.

AllMusic proclaimed that "older fans can breathe a sigh of relief: Target Earth is not only better than we had any right to expect, it's relentlessly creative, inspired, and manic." Exclaim! praised Dan Mongrain's ability to play in Piggy's style without being merely imitative and noted that fears that Voivod would be unable to recapture the classic magic were "shattered within moments of the title track." Popmatters opined that, "were it not for the modern production you would be led to believe Target Earth is the natural successor to Nothingface in terms of being more rhythmically complex, forceful and lively than Voïvod have sounded in an age."

However, The Quietus criticized the album for failing to connect with the listener, speculating that fans of War and Pain and Killing Technology "may find Target Earth laborious, even alienating in its prog meanderings and long running time."

== Track listing ==
All lyrics are written by Denis Bélanger; all music is composed by Voivod.

No.	Title	Length
1.	"Target Earth"	6:03
2.	"Kluskap O'Kom"	4:24
3.	"Empathy for the Enemy"	5:46
4.	"Mechanical Mind"	7:34
5.	"Warchaic"	7:02
6.	"Resistance"	6:44
7.	"Kaleidos"	6:27
8.	"Corps étranger"	4:35
9.	"Artefact"	6:26
10.	"Defiance"	1:32
Total length:		56:35

Limited Edition Digibook bonus tracks
No.	Title	Length
11.	"Target Earth" (Live at Roadburn 2011)	5:58
12.	"Man in the Trees" (Live at Roadburn 2011)	3:39
Total length:		66:12

Limited Edition Box Set bonus disc: Live at Roadburn 2011
No.	Title	Length
1.	"The Prow"	3:26
2.	"Ravenous Medicine"	4:37
3.	"Overreaction"	5:08
4.	"Experiment"	5:49
5.	"Global Warning"	4:17
6.	"Ripping Headaches"	3:32
7.	"Nothingface"	4:20
8.	"Forlorn"	4:57
9.	"Voivod"	4:21
10.	"Astronomy Domine"	7:12
Total length:		47:10

== Personnel ==
Voivod

- Denis Bélanger (Snake) – vocals
- Daniel Mongrain (Chewy) – guitars
- Jean-Yves Thériault (Blacky) – bass, engineer
- Michel Langevin (Away) – drums, artwork

Additional musicians

- Katajjaq Inuit – additional vocals on track 2
- Periklis Tsoukalas – additional performance on track 3

Production

- Pierre Rémillard – engineer
- Martin Brunet, Peter Edwards – assistant engineers
- Sanford Parker – mixing
- Colin Jordan – mastering
