= Synchro Anarchy =

Studio album by Voivod
- Released: February 11, 2022
- Recorded: 2021
- Studio: RadicArt Studio
- Genres: Progressive metal; thrash metal
- Length: 47:54
- Label: Century Media
- Producer: Francis Perron

Voivod chronology
The Wake (2018)	Synchro Anarchy (2022)	Morgöth Tales (2023)

Singles from Synchro Anarchy
- 1. "Planet Eaters" Released: December 10, 2021; 2. "Paranormalium" Released: January 5, 2022; 3. "Synchro Anarchy" Released: January 26, 2022; 4. "Sleeves Off" Released: February 11, 2022

Synchro Anarchy is the fifteenth studio album, and nineteenth release overall, by Canadian heavy metal band Voivod, released on February 11, 2022. Like its predecessor The Wake, this album was produced by Voivod and Francis Perron who also recorded and mixed it. The mastering was done by Maor Appelbaum and the artwork was designed by drummer Michel "Away" Langevin, who has created the cover artwork for each of the band's albums since their 1984 debut War and Pain. Synchro Anarchy also marks the first album by Voivod since 2009's Infini to have been recorded with the same lineup as the prior album. The album won the Metal/Hard Music Album of the Year category at the Juno Awards of 2023.

== Track listing ==
Synchro Anarchy track listing
No.	Title	Length
1.	"Paranormalium"	5:34
2.	"Synchro Anarchy"	4:25
3.	"Planet Eaters"	5:32
4.	"Mind Clock"	6:44
5.	"Sleeves Off"	4:08
6.	"Holographic Thinking"	6:11
7.	"The World Today"	4:10
8.	"Quest for Nothing"	5:37
9.	"Memory Failure"	5:33
Total length:		47:54

Japanese limited edition bonus CD (Disc 2)
No.	Title	Length
1.	"Post Society" (Return to Morgöth - Live 2018)	7:39
2.	"The Unknown Knows" (Return to Morgöth - Live 2018)	6:47
3.	"Ravenous Medicine" (Return to Morgöth - Live 2018)	4:42
4.	"Psychic Vacuum" (Return to Morgöth - Live 2018)	5:51
5.	"Obsolete Beings" (Return to Morgöth - Live 2018)	4:51
6.	"Technocratic Manipulators" (Return to Morgöth - Live 2018)	5:25
7.	"Fall" (Return to Morgöth - Live 2018)	7:48
8.	"The Prow" (Return to Morgöth - Live 2018)	4:16
9.	"Order of the Blackguards" (Return to Morgöth - Live 2018)	6:13
10.	"The Lost Machine" (Return to Morgöth - Live 2018)	5:40
11.	"Korgüll the Exterminator" (Return to Morgöth - Live 2018)	6:11
Total length:		66:24

== Personnel ==
- Michel "Away" Langevin – drums
- Denis "Snake" Bélanger – vocals
- Daniel "Chewy" Mongrain – guitars
- Dominique "Rocky" Laroche – bass

Production

- Voivod – production
- Francis Perron – co-production, recording engineering, mixing engineering
- Maor Appelbaum – mastering engineering

== Charts ==
Chart performance for Synchro Anarchy
Chart (2022)	Peak position
Austrian Albums (Ö3 Austria)	67
Belgian Albums (Ultratop Flanders)	146
Belgian Albums (Ultratop Wallonia)	138
Dutch Albums (Album Top 100)	88
Finnish Albums (Suomen virallinen lista)	23
German Albums (Offizielle Top 100)	7
Scottish Albums (Official Charts)	44
Swiss Albums (Schweizer Hitparade)	64
UK Rock & Metal Albums (Official Charts)	7
