= Post Society =

EP by Voivod
- Released: February 26, 2016
- Recorded: 2015
- Studio: RadicArt Studio, Notre-Dame-du-Mont-Carmel, Quebec, Canada
- Genre: Progressive metal; thrash metal
- Length: 30:25
- Label: Century Media
- Producer: Voivod

Voivod chronology
Target Earth (2013)	Post Society (2016)	The Wake (2018)

Singles from Post Society
- 1. "We Are Connected" Released: 27 Jan 2015; 2. "Post Society" Released: 22 December 2016

Post Society is an EP by Canadian heavy metal band Voivod released on February 26, 2016. It is the band's seventeenth release overall and the first studio release with Dominique Laroche on bass, replacing Jean-Yves Thériault.

== Reception ==
Professional ratings
Review scores
Source	Rating
Blabbermouth.net	8.5/10
Brave Words & Bloody Knuckles	8.0/10
Metal Hammer	4/5 stars
PopMatters	8/10 stars
Rock Hard	8.0/10
Sputnikmusic	3.8/5

The album received highly positive reviews. Writing for Blabbermouth.net, Ray Van Horn Jr. suggested that Post Society fell between Dimension Hatröss and Angel Rat with its mixture of thrash metal and progressive metal. Jedd Beaudoin, writing for PopMatters, praised Voivod for being "so vital, focused, committed."

== Track listing ==
All lyrics are written by Snake; all music is composed by Voivod, except where noted.

No.	Title	Length
1.	"Post Society"	6:17
2.	"Forever Mountain"	5:12
3.	"Fall"	6:42
4.	"We Are Connected"	7:26
5.	"Silver Machine" (Hawkwind cover, written by Robert Calvert and Dave Brock)	4:48
Total length:		30:32

== Personnel ==
Voivod

- Denis Bélanger (Snake) – vocals
- Daniel Mongrain (Chewy) – guitars
- Dominique Laroche (Rocky) – bass
- Michel Langevin (Away) – drums, artwork

Production

- Francis Perron – mixing
- Pierre Rémillard – mastering
