= Aut'Chose =

Canadian garage rock band

- Origin: Montreal, Quebec
- Genres: Garage rock
- Years active: 1974–1977; 2014–2024
- Labels: Columbia Records, CBS Records International, Star Music, Disques Artic, Hasard Records, Amusic
- Members: Jacques Racine; Michel Langevin; Joe Evil; Vincent Peake; Alex Crow
- Past members: Pierre-André Gauthier; Denis D'Amour; Mick Gauthier; Jacques Lalumière; Jean-François St-Georges; Lucien Francœur

Aut'Chose was a Canadian garage rock group from Montreal, Quebec, first active in the 1970s.

== History ==
Led by poet Lucien Francœur, the band's original lineup featured a rotating collective of musicians including Pierre-André Gauthier, Jacques Racine, Mick Gauthier, Jacques Lalumière and Jean-François St-Georges. This group released three albums, Prends une chance avec moé (1974), Une nuit comme une autre (1975), and Le Cauchemar américain (1976).

The band broke up in 1976, just weeks after the release of Le Cauchemar américain. They were still nominated for Most Promising New Group at the Juno Awards of 1976.

The compilation Chaud comme un juke-box was released in France in 1977, and the compilation Encore was released in Canada in 1981.

Francœur continued to record and perform as a solo artist, and was noted for his single "Le Rap-à-Billy", which was credited as the first French Canadian rap single. He also continued to publish work as a poet, winning the Prix Émile-Nelligan in 1983 for his poetry collection Les Rockeurs sanctifiés.

In 2001, Francœur and Pierre Gauthier released an acoustic album of Aut'Chose songs, Dans la jungle des villes.

== Revival ==
In 2004, Francœur revived the band for a 30th anniversary show. Original members Francœur and Racine were supported by Michel Langevin and Denis D'Amour of Voïvod, Vincent Peake of Groovy Aardvark and Joe Evil of Grimskunk. The same lineup released a reunion album, Chansons d'épouvante in 2005.

All four of their studio albums and a concert DVD were re-released in 2014 as the box set Chaud comme un juke-box, l'intégrale.

As of 2019, the band was continuing to perform.

Francœur died on 5 November 2024, at the age of 76.

== Discography ==
=== Albums ===
- Prends une chance avec moé (1975-02-17), Columbia, CBS
- Une nuit comme une autre (1975-10-08), CBS
- Le Cauchemar américain (1976-10-14), CBS
- Dans la jungle des villes (2001), Star Records (Star Music)
- Chansons d'Épouvante (2005), Disques Artic

=== Compilations ===
- Chaud comme un juke-box (1977), CBS
- Encore (1981), CBS
- Chaud comme un juke-box, l'intégrale (2014), Amusic

=== Singles ===
- "Ch't'aime pi ch't'en Veux" / "Hey You Woman" (1974), CBS
- "Sexe-Fiction" / "Prends une chance avec moé" (1975), CBS
- "Nancy Beaudoin" (1975), CBS
- "Ambulance Francoeur" / "Blue jeans sur la plage" (1975), CBS
- "Le P'tit gros" / "Les Pays d'en haut" (1976), CBS
- "Le Rock-à-l'école" / "Ben dans ma peau" (1982), Hasard Records
