= Echobrain =

American rock band

- Echobrain in 2002. From left to right: Brian Sagrafena, Dylan Donkin, and Jason Newsted

Background information
- Genres: Alternative rock, alternative metal
- Years active: 2000–2005
- Label: Surfdog
- Past members: Dylan Donkin; Brian Sagrafena; Jason Newsted; David Borla; Chris Scianni; Adam Donkin; Andrew Gomez

Echobrain was an American rock/metal musical group formed in 2000, prominent for featuring bass guitarist Jason Newsted after his departure from Metallica. They released three albums and disbanded in 2005.

== History ==
Echobrain was formed in 2000 by Newsted, drummer Brian Sagrafena and singer/guitarist Dylan Donkin, all of whom had close contact with one another throughout the late-1990s after they met at a Super Bowl party at Newsted's home in 1995. On a road trip to Baja, Mexico, Sagrafena and Donkin recorded some rough demos. These recordings eventually caught Newsted's attention, who then offered to help out on bass guitar and assist with songwriting. In May 2000, they entered a studio to record the demos more professionally, with help from several musicians including Newsted's then-colleague and Metallica guitarist Kirk Hammett, and former Faith No More guitarist Jim Martin.

Newsted funded Echobrain himself, later claiming that he lost a great deal of money in the project. The tension created out of Newsted's work in Echobrain ultimately led to his departure from Metallica after over 14 years with the group. Metallica frontman James Hetfield expressed disapproval of Newsted's new focus, saying, "When someone does a side project, it takes away from the strength of Metallica" and pondered, "Where would it end? Does he start touring with it? Does he sell shirts? Is it his band?" Newsted responded by pointing out Hetfield's side projects with members of Corrosion of Conformity and his playing and singing on the South Park: Bigger, Longer & Uncut film. The remaining members of Metallica with producer Bob Rock were also filmed going to an Echobrain performance in the 2004 documentary Metallica: Some Kind of Monster. After the performance, they hoped to speak with Newsted in congratulations, but he was nowhere to be found; however, it was revealed in the DVD commentary by Kirk Hammett that he had met with Jason outside of the venue and talked with him there.

In 2002, Echobrain was sued by Dallas–Fort Worth, Texas funk rock band Echo Drain for trademark infringement. The United States District Court, C.D. California, dismissed that lawsuit in Echobrain's favor on Aug. 29, 2003 in Echo Drain v. Newsted, 307 F.Supp.2d 1116 (C.D.Cal., 2003). The Court found that "Echo Drain" mark was descriptive and not protectable; there was no likelihood of confusion; even if band had protectable trademark, its rights in mark were limited to geographical area of Dallas–Fort Worth; and Echobrain were not guilty of cybersquatting.

Echobrain opened several shows for Neil Young and appeared in his film Greendale.

Echobrain has since become inactive and all of its members have moved on to other projects. Dylan Donkin is a solo artist. His brother Adam is a producer who focuses on producing emerging artists, including Dylan. Andrew Gomez fronts the acoustic rock outfit, the Cons. Newsted joined Voivod for a time as their studio bass player.

== Line-ups ==
- Dylan Donkin – vocals, guitar, piano (2000–2005)
- Brian Sagrafena – drums, percussion (2000–2005)
- Jason Newsted – bass (2000–2004)
- Chris Scianni – guitar (2000–2002)
- David Borla – guitar (2002–2004)
- Andrew Gomez – guitar, bass, piano (2004–2005)
- Adam Donkin – bass (2004–2005)

== Discography ==
Year	Title	Label
March 5, 2002	Echobrain	Surfdog
Jul 23, 2002	Strange Enjoyment	Chophouse
Jan 1, 2004	Glean	Surfdog
Nov, 2026	The Canyon	
