= Jason Newsted =

American bassist (born 1963)

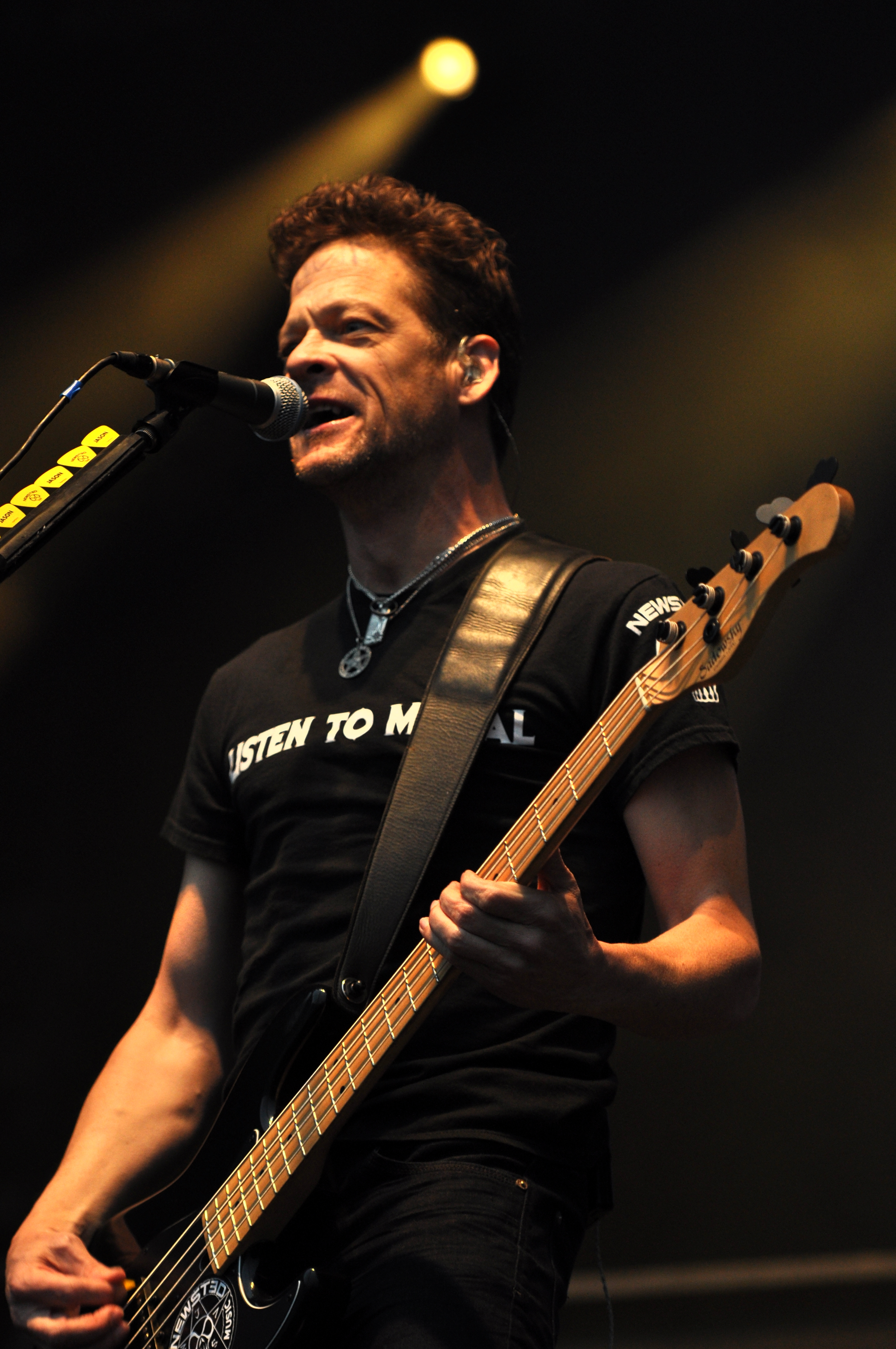
- Newsted at Rock am Ring 2013

Background information
- Also known as: Jasonic, Jason "Newkid"
- Born: Jason Curtis Newsted; March 4, 1963 (age 63); Battle Creek, Michigan, U.S.
- Genres: Heavy metal; thrash metal; hard rock
- Occupations: Musician; songwriter
- Instruments: Bass guitar; vocals
- Years active: 1981–present
- Member of: Newsted
- Formerly of: Voivod; Metallica; Flotsam and Jetsam; Papa Wheelie; Rock Star Supernova; Echobrain; Ozzy Osbourne Band; Spastik Children; WhoCares

Jason Curtis Newsted (born March 4, 1963) is an American musician who was the bassist of heavy metal band Metallica from 1986 to 2001. He first performed with thrash metal band Flotsam and Jetsam from 1981 to 1986 before joining Metallica. Newsted performed on the albums ...And Justice for All (1988), Metallica (1991), Load (1996), and Reload (1997), the most appearances among Metallica's bassists.

After leaving Metallica, Newsted was a member of metal bands Echobrain and Voivod, using the pseudonym Jasonic for the latter, and toured with Ozzy Osbourne. Since 2012, he has fronted heavy metal band Newsted. Newsted was inducted to the Rock and Roll Hall of Fame as a member of Metallica in 2009.

== Early life ==
Jason Curtis Newsted was born on March 4, 1963 in Battle Creek, Michigan. He has two older brothers and a younger sister. He grew up on a farm and at the age of six was given the responsibility of looking after animals. He was tasked with looking after hundreds of chickens and rabbits. He told author Paul Stenning, "It's where I learned about life – seeing a baby cow born right in front of your eyes when you're eight years old is pretty intense…I was from a very strong family and I was raised to be a strong, pure Americana farm boy."

Newsted's mother taught piano and one of his brothers plays trumpet. He was exposed to music as a child, listening to the record collections of his older brothers. His first instrument was a guitar, which he started to play at 9 years old, but he moved to bass at 14, after listening to Gene Simmons of Kiss. Newsted dropped out of high school at age 18 and joined 'Gangster' a local metal band before the group decided to relocate to California.

Newsted cites Geezer Butler of Black Sabbath as his major influence. He lists Lemmy Kilmister of Motörhead, Steve Harris of Iron Maiden, Peter Baltes of Accept, Geddy Lee of Rush, Rob Grange of Ted Nugent, and Bill Church of Montrose as other significant influences.

== Career ==
=== Flotsam and Jetsam ===
Following the breakup of Newsted's band 'Gangster' amidst their move to California in 1982; Newsted wound up living in Phoenix, Arizona temporarily before he joined thrash metal band Flotsam and Jetsam. Newsted wrote the majority of lyrics for their 1986 album Doomsday for the Deceiver.

=== Metallica ===
On September 27, 1986, during the European leg of the Damage, Inc. Tour, Metallica's bassist Cliff Burton died in a tour bus crash. Following Burton's death, the group began a search for a new bassist. They considered and auditioned over 50 musicians, including Greg Christian of Testament, Les Claypool of Primus, Gene Gilfen of Blind Illusion, Mike Jastremski of Heathen, Mel Sanchez of Abattoir, Troy Gregory and various others. Newsted was the last in line and ended up winning the part.

Newsted said in a 2015 interview that he learned about Metallica's plan to open for Ozzy Osbourne's tour at the time. To his advantage, Newsted strategically procured the band's setlist, studied it, and presented it to drummer Lars Ulrich saying he knew all these songs, much to Ulrich's surprise. Two days later, Metallica invited Newsted back and told to him that he had been chosen to fill the bassist position. The band involved both of Burton's parents in the decision to choose Newsted. After the band broke the news to Newsted, Burton's mother hugged him tightly and said, "You are the one. Please, be safe."

Newsted's first live performance with Metallica was at the Country Club in Reseda, California, November 8, 1986. His studio debut with Metallica was on The $5.98 E.P. - Garage Days Re-Revisited in 1987 in which he was credited as 'Master J Newkid' in the liner notes. This was followed by his first studio album with the band, ...And Justice for All (1988), which was criticized for its undermixed bass guitar and thin tone. Newsted said that this was deliberate on the part of Lars Ulrich and James Hetfield, although both Ulrich and Hetfield stated they were also disappointed with the production of the album. They stated that most or all of Newsted's bass lines closely followed the rhythm guitar lines to the point of being indiscernible from each other. However, Steve Thompson, who mixed the album, said that Ulrich was to blame for the inaudible bass and unusual drums. Thompson wanted to be relieved of his mixing duties when Ulrich presented his ideas on the production, but Thompson was not allowed to leave and received the majority of the criticism for the poor sound quality of the record. Nonetheless, the album peaked at number 6 on the Billboard 200 and projected the band to higher success.

Newsted subsequently performed on the self-titled album Metallica (1991), which is the best-selling Metallica album to date, as well as on Load (1996), Reload (1997), and Garage Inc (1998). Newsted appeared on the live concert releases Live Shit: Binge & Purge (1993), Cunning Stunts (1997), and S&M (1999), his last studio appearance with Metallica.

During his time in Metallica, Newsted also sang backing vocals or occasional lead vocals on a number of Metallica songs. During tours, beginning in 1989, he would often sing parts of "Creeping Death", "Whiplash" and "Seek & Destroy", and he performed lead in most songs for three shows at the Summer Sanitarium Tour, where Hetfield was recovering from injury. Newsted was often praised for his live performances with the band by fans for his showmanship and participation throughout his tenure with Metallica.

He has co-written three Metallica songs:

- "Blackened" (...And Justice for All) (James Hetfield, Lars Ulrich, Jason Newsted)
- "My Friend of Misery" (Metallica) (Hetfield, Ulrich, Newsted)
- "Where the Wild Things Are" (ReLoad) (Hetfield, Ulrich, Newsted)

He performed his last live show as Metallica's bassist on November 30, 2000, at the My VH1 Music Awards.

=== Echobrain and departure from Metallica ===
During a meeting between the members of Metallica in December 2000, Newsted proposed that the band should take a year-long hiatus, and he would use that time to focus on his side-project Echobrain. When the other band members (specifically James Hetfield) rejected Newsted's proposals, he chose to quit the band. On January 17, 2001, as plans were being made for the band to enter the recording studio to record their eighth studio album, Newsted made his departure public, citing "private and personal reasons and the physical damage I have done to myself over the years while playing the music that I love." During a Playboy interview with Metallica, Newsted revealed that he wanted to release an album with Echobrain. Hetfield was against the idea and said, "When someone does a side project, it takes away from the strength of Metallica." Newsted countered his statement by citing Hetfield's contributions to other musical outlets. Hetfield replied, "My name isn't on those records, and I'm not out trying to sell them", and pondered questions such as "Where would it end? Does he start touring with it? Does he sell shirts? Is it his band?" Newsted's departure from Metallica, along with Hetfield's decision to go to rehab a few months later, almost led to a breakup of the band. After Hetfield rejoined Metallica, the band finished recording St. Anger, with record producer Bob Rock filling the bass slot. Robert Trujillo became the band's new bassist in 2003.

Newsted has stated that he has never regretted leaving the band. In a 2009 interview, he said, "I tell you very honestly, one billion percent, I have never regretted leaving Metallica. It was the right thing for everyone. It was the right thing to do for the camp. That's it. I've never told anyone that I wanted to go back or anything like that—not once. I made up my mind. It was not an easy thing to do, but it was something I had to do. I thought about it very much before I pulled the trigger and because of that, I have never looked back. The past is where it's supposed to be." It was mentioned in the film Metallica: Some Kind of Monster that there was a rumor that Newsted would possibly rejoin the band, but to date it has not happened, aside from the brief appearance on the 30th anniversary shows.

Despite his departure from Metallica, Newsted reportedly remains on cordial terms with Ulrich, Trujillo, Hetfield, and Hammett. On April 4, 2009, Newsted joined Metallica for its induction into the Rock and Roll Hall of Fame in Cleveland, Ohio. He also performed three songs at the event—"Master of Puppets", "Enter Sandman", and "Train Kept A-Rollin'"—with Hetfield, Ulrich, Hammett, and Robert Trujillo, and Jeff Beck, Jimmy Page, Joe Perry, Ron Wood, and Flea. On December 5, 7, 9 and 10, 2011, Newsted reunited with Metallica during all four of their 30th anniversary shows and performed several songs with the band and, in some cases, other guest musicians. Hetfield noted how the fans "lit up" as Newsted walked on stage, smiling and waving to the crowd.

On December 16, 2013, Newsted expanded upon previous statements regarding his departure from Metallica and cited that his project with Echobrain was being discouraged by James Hetfield because Metallica's management at Q Prime wanted to go ahead with promoting Echobrain but was forced to drop it by Hetfield's demands with the quote "other arrangements can be made". Newsted was sure that Echobrain would not affect Metallica, explaining "And so they had told me, pretty convincingly, 'This is a great record, we've been playing it around the office, that's all I've been hearing, it's fantastic, this kid has a great voice. Let's do something with this.' That's what they told me, and then James Hetfield heard about it and was not happy. He was, I think, pretty much out to put the kibosh on the whole thing because it would somehow affect Metallica in his eyes, because now the managers were interested in something I was doing that had nothing to do with him". Newsted summed up the situation as follows: "I have no idea what [Hetfield] was thinking, other than just protecting what he valued, just like he does; that's his thing. He protects what he loves, squeezes it too hard, like he said himself. Squeeze it too hard, protecting it too much. That's where I was coming from. The people that I had counted on for 15 years to help me with my career, help Metallica, take care of my money, do all of those things, told me, 'Your new project is fantastic, we'd like to help you with it.' James heard about it, the manager calls me back a couple of days later – 'Sorry we're not going to be able to help you with that Echobrain thing'."

Ulrich admitted that Newsted's departure made a huge dent on Metallica, saying that his presence was overlooked.

"The ironic thing is that the model for what would have been the perfect Metallica in Jason's mind is the one that exists now. That is kind of ironic. It's also a little sad, because Jason's a good guy and he put a lot of effort into the band for many years, and in retrospect he was never really fully accepted into the band. Then when he tried to go elsewhere to satisfy his creative needs, he was told — well, barked at — that he couldn't. [Newsted] was the sacrificial lamb for our spiritual and mental growth as well as our creative growth, and it just sucks. It's medieval."

— Lars Ulrich (2003)

Hetfield once revealed that the initial writing sessions without Newsted were unsatisfying and that "the music was not all it could have been." He also admitted in October 2022 that the song "All Within My Hands" was about Newsted's departure, stating that he used it as a means of documenting his internal problems, talking about how "love is control" in the lyrics and crushing everything in his hands to mold Newsted into doing what he was told.

After releasing three studio albums, Newsted left Echobrain in 2004 and the group disbanded a year later.

=== Papa Wheelie ===
In 1997, Newsted formed Papa Wheelie at his home studio The Chophouse. In 2001, the band consisted of Joe "Joefus" Ledesma and Steven Wiig and recorded the album "Unipsycho" in Walnut Creek, CA. In 2002, Papa Wheelie recorded "Live Lycanthropy" at The Plant in Sausalito, California. After a hiatus, they reconvened to play a series of live shows in late 2011 in the San Francisco Bay Area performing with Anvil and Kyuss Lives. The band recorded a third album in 2011 which included two cover songs by Motörhead and Van Halen. The album is yet to be released.

=== Ozzy Osbourne ===
Newsted joined Canadian thrash metal band Voivod in 2002. Coincidentally, he was also Trujillo's replacement in Osbourne's band during Ozzfest 2003, which included Voivod as a Second Stage act. During an MTV interview, both Osbourne and Newsted showed enthusiasm in writing an album together, with Osbourne comparing Newsted to "a young Geezer Butler". However, this would not come to fruition as Newsted left Osbourne upon finishing tour duties in late 2003. He would soon be replaced by Rob Zombie bassist Rob "Blasko" Nicholson.

Focusing on Voivod, Newsted recorded two albums before his participation in Rock Star Supernova, a supergroup created through reality television series Rock Star: Supernova in 2006.

=== Voivod ===
The fourth incarnation of Voivod featured three of the four founding members: Denis Bélanger (vocals), Denis D'Amour (guitar), and Michel Langevin (drums), with Newsted on bass guitar. D'Amour died at the age of 45 on August 26, 2005, due to complications from colon cancer. The record Katorz (a phonetic spelling of quatorze, the French word for fourteen), released in July 2006, was based around riffs found on D'Amour's laptop.

A December 2008 update on Voivod's website noted that Newsted played "all the bass tracks" on their latest album Infini, which was released on June 23, 2009. Since then, Voivod reunited with their original bass player, Jean-Yves Thériault (Blacky), for a short period of time before he would leave the band permanently.

=== Rock Star Supernova ===
Supernova formed the basis of the second season of the CBS television program Rock Star in the quest to find a lead singer. The show began online on the Rock Star website on MSN on Monday, July 3, 2006, with an Internet exclusive weekly episode, and premiered on CBS on that Wednesday, July 5. Votes were cast via the website. On September 13, 2006, Lukas Rossi was crowned the winner.

=== Art career ===
Thanks to Lars Ulrich's interest in collecting art, Newsted became interested in the work of artists such as Jean Fautrier, Pablo Picasso, and Jean-Michel Basquiat. After leaving Metallica, Newsted took up painting as a hobby. He is a prolific artist and has displayed art around the United States.

While recovering from his shoulder injury in 2006, Newsted found solace through painting. Newsted has turned out a number of large original works of art over the last half a decade. Newsted said that he went "from making crazy and colorful music to making crazy and colorful paintings." His first gallery show opened on May 4, 2010, at Micaëla Gallery in San Francisco.

=== Rock and Roll Hall of Fame induction ===
On April 4, 2009, Newsted was present with his former Metallica bandmates James Hetfield, Lars Ulrich and Kirk Hammett, as well as Ray Burton, the father of late Metallica bassist Cliff Burton. He performed with the band alongside current bassist Robert Trujillo at the Rock and Roll Hall of Fame induction ceremony in Cleveland, Ohio.

It was his first performance with the band in nearly a decade, their last performance together having taken place during the VH-1 Awards at the Shrine Auditorium in November 2000. Both Newsted and Trujillo performed onstage at the same time, which was a first for the band.

=== WhoCares ===
In October 2010 Newsted joined a supergroup with singer Ian Gillan and former keyboardist Jon Lord from Deep Purple, guitarist Tony Iommi from Black Sabbath, second guitarist Mikko Lindström from HIM, and drummer Nicko McBrain from Iron Maiden. The band, called WhoCares, recorded a charity single titled "Out of My Mind". The charity single also features a track titled "Holy Water" and is available as digital download or CD format as of May 6, 2011.

=== Newsted ===
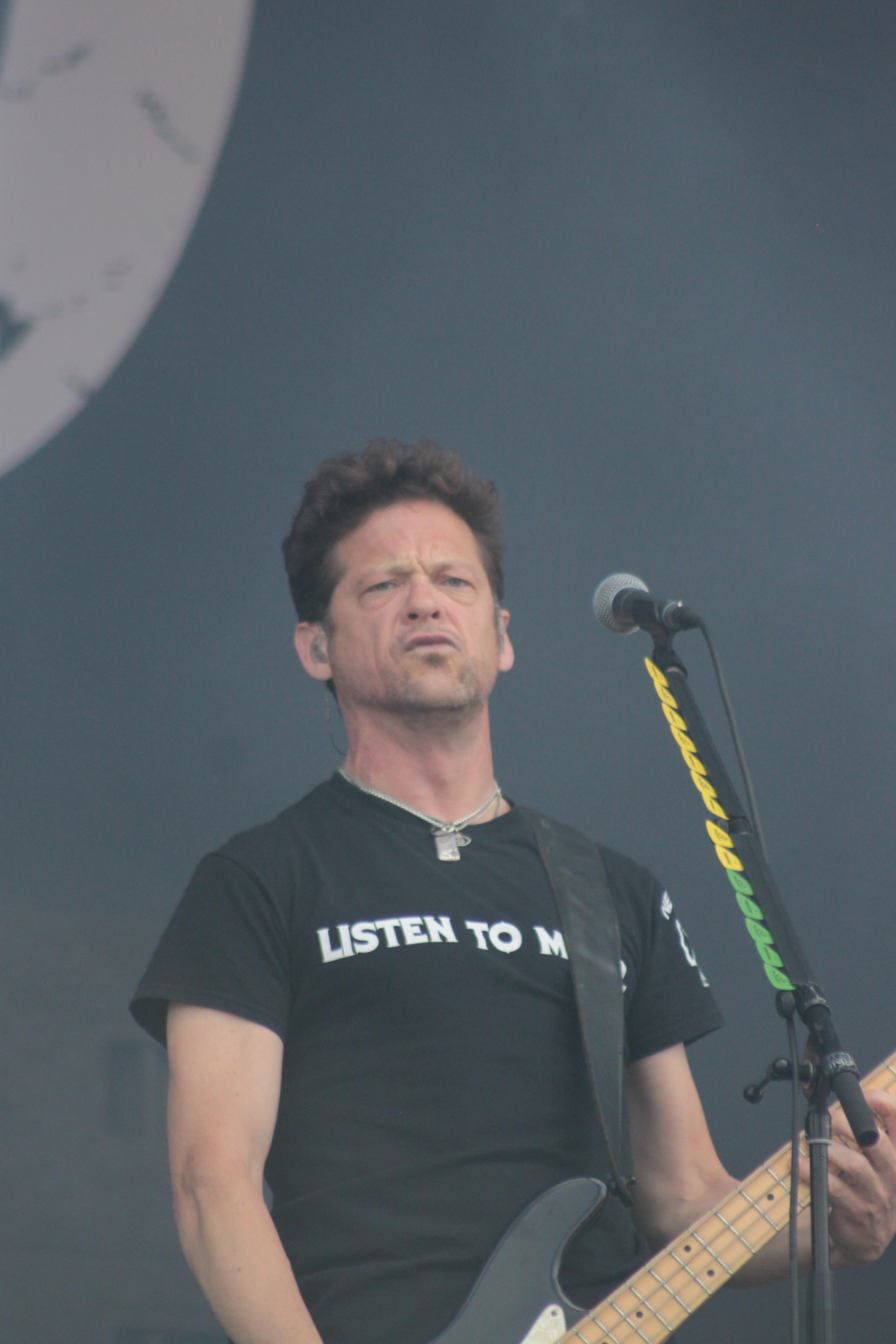
Jason Newsted playing live with his band Newsted in 2013

In December 2012, Newsted formed his own band called Newsted with drummer Jesus Mendez Jr. and guitarist Jessie Farnsworth, with Staind guitarist Mike Mushok joining later in March 2013. The band released a four-song EP, titled Metal, on January 8, 2013.

Newsted released its debut album entitled Heavy Metal Music on August 6, 2013. In September 2014, the band appeared inactive as its website contained only a brief message that as of September 15, 2014, Jason Newsted was no longer on any social networking sites. As of 2018, the Newsted official website has been deactivated.

He ceased touring with Newsted due to other musical interests as well as the band being unprofitable. He says "It cost me an awful lot of money – hundreds of thousands of dollars to take the Newsted band around to the 22 countries we played."

In April 2023, Newsted announced the band had been reactivated and would play their first show in nearly a decade on May 20 at Revolution Live in Fort Lauderdale, Florida.

=== Jason Newsted and the Chophouse Band ===
In August 2016, after being out of the public eye for two years, Newsted formed a new acoustic group named Jason Newsted and the Chophouse Band, and had scheduled several performing dates throughout the fall.

A fan-made video showed the band (with Newsted on acoustic guitar and lead vocals) playing the Woody Guthrie classic "This Land Is Your Land".

=== Megadeth rumors ===
Despite a brief onstage performance with Megadeth in 2013, Newsted was heavily rumored by fans to join the band as a possible replacement for recently-dismissed bassist David Ellefson in May 2021, though the rumors would later be denied by both Newsted and his wife Nicole.

== Equipment and bass rig ==
In July 2024, Sadowsky announced a Limited Edition Jason Newsted Signature model, his first since the company's endorsement in 1997. This special edition includes a total of 13 bass guitars, with eight 4-string models priced at $7,500 and five 5-string models priced at $7,800. By September 1, 2024, all basses were sold.

== Personal life ==
Newsted was married in 1988 to Judy Talbert but the couple divorced in 1991 during the recordings of the Black Album. He is currently married to his longtime girlfriend Nicole Leigh Smith, whom he wed in October 2012. Nicole, an artist, encouraged him to try painting.

=== Shoulder injury ===
On October 23, 2006, Newsted was injured while attempting to catch a falling bass amp head (the bass amp head which was used for recording Metallica, Load and Reload). The accident resulted in a torn anterior labrum in his left shoulder and a rotator cuff and biceps tear in the right. He was scheduled for immediate surgery, and underwent a lengthy rehab process. During this time he was unable to play, and began to express himself through painting. On January 4, 2007, he was back playing his bass again.

Newsted later reported that he had been addicted to painkillers, having taken such medication from his time in Metallica to cope with neck problems but without understanding the risks. After his shoulder injury the painkiller use became a problem, but Newsted said he had not used any since about 2010.

== Discography ==
Echobrain

- Echobrain (2002)
- Strange Enjoyment (2002) (EP)
- Glean (2004) (writing credit on one song, producer)

Flotsam and Jetsam

- Doomsday for the Deceiver (1986)
- No Place for Disgrace (1988) (writing credits on three songs)
- Ugly Noise (2012) (credited for songwriting, but does not perform)

Gov't Mule

- The Deep End, Volume 2 (2002)

IR8/Sexoturica

- IR8 vs. Sexoturica (2002)

Metallica

- The $5.98 E.P. – Garage Days Re-Revisited (EP) (1987)
- ...And Justice for All (1988)
- Metallica (1991)
- Live Shit: Binge & Purge (1993)
- Load (1996)
- Reload (1997)
- Garage Inc. (1998)
- Cunning Stunts (1998)
- S&M (1999)
- "I Disappear" (2000)
- Six Feet Down Under (2010)

Moss Brothers

- Electricitation (2001)

Newsted

- Metal (EP) (2013)
- Heavy Metal Music (2013)

Papa Wheelie

- Unipsycho (2002)
- Live Lycanthropy (2003)

Rock Star Supernova

- Rock Star Supernova (2006)

Sepultura

- Against (1998) (track 14, "Hatred Aside")

Speedealer

- Second Sight (2002) (producer)

Tina Turner & Elisa Toffoli

- Teach Me Again (2006) (Single)

Unkle

- Psyence Fiction (1998)

Voivod

- Voivod (2003)
- Katorz (2006)
- Infini (2009)

WhoCares

- Out of My Mind / Holy Water (2011)

Preceded by Cliff Burton	Metallica bassist 1986–2001	Succeeded by Bob Rock (Sessions)
