= The Wake (Voivod album) =

Studio album by Voivod
- Released: September 21, 2018
- Studio: RadicArt Recording Studio
- Genre: Progressive metal; thrash metal
- Length: 56:01
- Label: Century Media
- Producer: Francis Perron

Voivod chronology
Post Society (2016)	The Wake (2018)	Synchro Anarchy (2022)

Singles from The Wake
- 1. "Obsolete Beings" Released: July 20, 2018; 2. "Always Moving" Released: August 31, 2018; 3. "Iconspiracy" Released: September 14, 2018

Professional ratings
Review scores
Source	Rating
AllMusic	4/5 stars
Louder Sound	4.5/5 stars
Metal Injection	8/10
PopMatters	8/10 stars
Rolling Stone	4/5 stars
Metal Storm	8/10 stars

The Wake is the fourteenth studio album, and eighteenth release overall, by Canadian heavy metal band Voivod. The album was released on September 21, 2018 through Century Media Records.

The artwork was done by drummer Michel "Away" Langevin. It is also a concept album, and the first Voivod studio album to feature bassist Dominique "Rocky" Laroche, who replaced Jean-Yves "Blacky" Thériault in 2014. It was recorded and mixed by Francis Perron at RadicArt Recording Studio in Canada.

== Background ==
In an interview with Metal Hammer about the musical style of the album, Langevin said:

"The music is like a futuristic prog thrash metal trek with many twists and turns. The story involves the usual Voivodian topics: disasters, chaos, conflicts, strange plots and alternate consciousness."

== Awards ==
The album won the Metal/Hard Music Album of the Year at the Juno Awards of 2019.

== Accolades ==
Publication	Accolade	Rank	Ref.
Consequence of Sound	Top 25 Metal/Hard Rock Album of 2018	8	
Decibel	Decibel's Top 40 Albums of 2018	13	
PopMatters	Top 10 Progressive Rock/Metal Albums of 2018	10	
Rolling Stone	20 Best Metal Albums of 2018	8	
Sputnikmusic	Top 50 Albums of 2018	49	

== Track listing ==
No.	Title	Length
1.	"Obsolete Beings"	5:35
2.	"The End of Dormancy"	7:42
3.	"Orb Confusion"	6:00
4.	"Iconspiracy"	5:16
5.	"Spherical Perspective"	7:41
6.	"Event Horizon"	6:11
7.	"Always Moving"	5:12
8.	"Sonic Mycelium"	12:24
Total length:		56:01

Deluxe edition bonus disc

No.	Title	Length
1.	"Inner Combustion"	4:23
2.	"Order of the Blackguards"	5:03
3.	"Psychic Vacuum"	4:17
4.	"Lost Machine"	6:01
5.	"Fall"	6:38
6.	"Voivod"	6:27
Total length:		32:50

== Personnel ==
- Michel "Away" Langevin – drums
- Denis "Snake" Bélanger – vocals
- Daniel "Chewy" Mongrain – guitars
- Dominique "Rocky" Laroche – bass

== Charts ==
Chart (2018)	Peak position
Belgian Albums (Ultratop Wallonia)	94
German Albums (Offizielle Top 100)	26
Hungarian Albums (MAHASZ)	32
Scottish Albums (OCC)	87
Swiss Albums (Schweizer Hitparade)	51

== Awards and nominations ==
Year	Award	Category	Nominee/Work	Result	Ref
2019	Juno Award	Metal/Hard Music Album of the Year	The Wake	Winner	
