= Voivod (album) =

Studio album by Voivod
- Released: March 4, 2003
- Recorded: October 13 – November 26, 2002
- Genre: Heavy metal; progressive metal
- Length: 65:32
- Label: Chophouse/Surfdog; Victor (Japan)
- Producer: Voivod, Brian Joseph Dobbs

Voivod chronology
Voivod Lives (2000)	Voivod (2003)	Katorz (2006)

Professional ratings
Review scores
Source	Rating
AllMusic	4.5/5 stars
Blabbermouth.net	7/10
Brave Words & Bloody Knuckles	8.5/10
PopMatters	(favourable)
Rock Hard	9.0/10
Rolling Stone	2/5 stars
Sputnikmusic	3.5/5

Voivod is the tenth studio album and thirteenth release overall by Canadian thrash metal/progressive metal band Voivod. It is the first since 1993's The Outer Limits to feature returning vocalist Denis Bélanger (Snake) and their first recording with bassist Jason Newsted (Jasonic), formerly of Metallica. It was released in 2003 on Newsted's Chophouse Records label. This is also the last album Voivod completed before guitarist Denis D'Amour (Piggy) died of colon cancer in 2005.

This album is notable for gaining the band greater exposure to a younger audience. A music video was produced for "We Carry On" and received heavy rotation on MTV2's Headbangers Ball and Fuse TV's Uranium upon release. The band was also interviewed on the latter program with Newsted detailing his transition from Metallica to Voivod, a group of which he had been a longtime fan. Voivod also performed on the Second Stage of Ozzfest 2003. This had Newsted assuming bass duties for both Voivod and headlining act, Ozzy Osbourne.

== Track listing ==
All lyrics are written by Snake; all music is composed by Voivod.

No.	Title	Length
1.	"Gasmask Revival"	4:16
2.	"Facing Up"	4:48
3.	"Blame Us"	5:35
4.	"Real Again?"	4:52
5.	"Rebel Robot"	4:48
6.	"The Multiverse"	5:28
7.	"I Don't Wanna Wake Up"	5:49
8.	"Les Cigares volants"	4:06
9.	"Divine Sun"	5:05
10.	"Reactor"	3:55
11.	"Invisible Planet"	4:37
12.	"Strange and Ironic"	4:31
13.	"We Carry On" (includes silence from 4:42 to 6:12, then hidden track)	7:42
Total length:		65:32

== Personnel ==
Voivod

- Denis Bélanger a.k.a. Snake - vocals
- Denis D'Amour a.k.a. Piggy - guitar
- Jason Newsted a.k.a. Jasonic - bass guitar
- Michel Langevin a.k.a. Away - drums, artwork

Production

- Brian Joseph Dobbs - producer, engineer, mixing
- Kent Matcke, Leff Lefferts Jr. - digital editing
- Enrique Gonzales Muller - editing assistant
- George Marino - mastering at Sterling Sound, New York
