= Dylan Donkin =

American rock musician

- Genres: Folk rock, Psychedelic, Surf rock, Rock
- Occupations: solo singer, guitarist, bassist
- Instruments: Voice, guitar, bass
- Years active: 2000–present
- Label: Surfdog Records
- Website: Dylan

Dylan Donkin is an American rock musician.

== Career ==
=== 2000–2005: Echobrain ===
Echobrain first formed in 2000. Before this, Donkin first met Jason Newsted and a few friends at Newsted's residence. On a road trip to Mexico's Baja California peninsula, Donkin and Brian Sagrafena recorded some rough demos that, when they came home, eventually caught Newsted's attention, who then offered to help out on bass guitar and assist the songwriting. In May 2000, they entered a studio to record the demos more professionally, with help from several musicians including Newsted's then-colleague and Metallica guitarist Kirk Hammett, and former Faith No More guitarist Jim Martin.

The band broke up in 2005 after releasing two albums and one EP.

=== 2005–present: solo career ===
Donkin released a 7" single, Make a Choice, in September 2006. Donkin released his debut full-length album, Food for Thoughtlessness, in May 2007.

Donkin was also the bassist for The Cons.

== Discography ==
=== Echobrain ===
- Echobrain (2002)
- Strange Enjoyment (2002)
- Glean (2004)

=== Solo ===
- Make a Choice (2006)
- Food for Thoughtlessness (2007)
- Freak Fuzz (2023)
