= Rrröööaaarrr =

Studio album by Voivod
- Released: March 14, 1986
- Recorded: November 11–17, 1985
- Studios: L'Autre Studios, Montreal, Quebec, Canada
- Genres: Thrash metal, speed metal
- Length: 38:26
- Labels: Banzai (Canada); Combat/Noise (US); Noise International (rest of the world)
- Producers: Voivod, Mike Amstadt, Maurice Richard

Voivod chronology
War and Pain (1984)	Rrröööaaarrr (1986)	Killing Technology (1987)

Professional ratings
Review scores
Source	Rating
AllMusic	2/5 stars
Collector's Guide to Heavy Metal	6/10
Kerrang!	4/5 stars
Rock Hard	8.0/10
Sputnikmusic	3.5/5

Rrröööaaarrr is the second studio album by Canadian heavy metal band Voivod. It was released in 1986 on Noise Records. Estimated sales are more than 40,000 copies, worldwide. In a 2012 interview with Michael Dodd of Get Your Rock Out, vocalist Denis Bélanger stated that, while a thrash record, the album represents a progression from thrash sound of War and Pain to the more progressive metal elements that would feature on Killing Technology.

== Track listing ==
All lyrics by Snake, and all music by Piggy, Blacky & Away.

Ripping Side
No.	Title	Length
1.	"Korgüll the Exterminator"	4:57
2.	"Fuck Off and Die"	3:37
3.	"Slaughter in a Grave"	4:07
4.	"Ripping Headaches"	3:14
5.	"Horror"	4:13

Thrashing Side
No.	Title	Length
6.	"Thrashing Rage"	4:35
7.	"The Helldriver"	3:45
8.	"Build Your Weapons"	4:46
9.	"To the Death!"	5:12

== Personnel ==
Voivod

- Snake (Denis Bélanger) – vocals
- Piggy (Denis D'Amour) – guitar, assistant engineer
- Blacky (Jean-Yves Thériault) – bass guitar, assistant engineer
- Away (Michel Langevin) – drums, artwork

Production

- Mike Amstadt – producer, engineer
- Maurice "Rocker" Richard – executive producer
