= War and Pain =

Studio album by Voivod
- Released: September 1984
- Recorded: June 19–27, 1984
- Studios: Le Terroir Studio, Laterrière (now part of Saguenay, Québec), Canada
- Genre: Thrash metal
- Length: 42:07
- Label: Metal Blade
- Producer: Voivod

Voivod chronology
War and Pain (1984)	Rrröööaaarrr (1986)

Professional ratings
Review scores
Source	Rating
AllMusic	3/5 stars
Collector's Guide to Heavy Metal	7/10
Exclaim!	(favourable)
PopMatters	(favourable)
Rock Hard	7.5/10
Sputnikmusic	3.5/5

War and Pain is the debut studio album by Canadian heavy metal band Voivod, released in September 1984.

War and Pain was reissued several times on the CD format (sometimes on different labels in other countries): the first CD issue on Metal Blade in 1987, in 1990 on Enigma Records; remastered by Metal Blade and reissued in 1994; it was also released in Roadrunner's Pricekillers series (also 1990); and again by Metal Blade in 2004 as a remastered 3-CD boxset (see the 20th Anniversary Edition section for the bonus material).

A music video was made for the title song "Voivod" and was directed by Dédé Fortin.

== Legacy and influence ==
The track "Black City" was used by heavy metal record store, Black City Records, located in Bristol, England, as the name of their business in 2021.

== Track listing ==
All lyrics are written by Denis "Snake" Bélanger; all music is composed by Denis "Piggy" D'Amour, Jean-Yves "Blacky" Thériault and Michel "Away" Langevin, except where indicated.

This Side (Iron)
No.	Title	Length
1.	"Voivod"	4:16
2.	"Warriors of Ice"	5:04
3.	"Suck Your Bone"	3:30
4.	"Iron Gang"	4:15
5.	"War and Pain"	4:55

That Side (Blower)
No.	Title	Length
6.	"Blower"	2:42
7.	"Live for Violence"	5:11
8.	"Black City"	5:08
9.	"Nuclear War"	7:01

Original cassette version bonus track
No.	Title	Length
10.	"Condemned to the Gallows"	5:07

"Condemned to the Gallows" was originally recorded for the compilation album Metal Massacre V. Aside from one "War and Pain" cassette pressing, "Condemned to the Gallows" would not appear again on any Voivod release until re-recorded in 2023 for Morgöth Tales.

== 20th Anniversary Edition ==
Disc one: War and Pain (Remastered)
No.	Title	Length
1.	"Voivod"	4:16
2.	"Warriors of Ice"	5:06
3.	"Suck Your Bone"	3:32
4.	"Iron Gang"	4:15
5.	"War and Pain"	4:55
6.	"Blower"	2:43
7.	"Live for Violence"	5:11
8.	"Black City"	5:07
9.	"Nuclear War"	7:02

Anachronism (1st show, June 1983)
No.	Title	Length
10.	"Condemned to the Gallows"	5:07
11.	"Blower"	3:01
12.	"Voivod"	3:50

To the Death (Metal Massacre 5 sessions, January 1984)
No.	Title	Length
13.	"Condemned to the Gallows"	5:09
14.	"Voivod"	4:41
15.	"Iron Gang"	4:24

=== Disc two: Morgoth Invasion (Live demo, December 1984) ===
No.	Title	Writer(s)	Length
1.	"Build Your Weapons"		4:42
2.	"War and Pain"		6:25
3.	"Condemned to the Gallows"		4:52
4.	"Warriors of Ice"		5:07
5.	"Helldriver"		3:57
6.	"Horror"		3:52
7.	"Black City"		5:32
8.	"Nuclear War"		6:32
9.	"Blower"		3:04
10.	"Live for Violence"		6:45
11.	"Ripping Headaches"		3:12
12.	"Iron Gang"		4:19
13.	"Korgüll the Exterminator"		4:50
14.	"Suck Your Bone"		4:25
15.	"Witching Hour" (Venom cover)		2:51
16.	"Chemical Warfare" (Slayer cover)	Jeff Hanneman, Kerry King	6:17

=== Bonus CD ===
- In addition to videos, text, and images, the Bonus CD also contains a 46.5 MB mp3 file consisting of the first 7 tracks from a live demo recorded in January 1984, known as "To The Death."

== Personnel ==
Voivod

- Denis "Snake" Bélanger – vocals
- Denis "Piggy" D'Amour – guitar
- Jean-Yves "Blacky" Thériault – bass
- Michel "Away" Langevin – drums, artwork

Production

- Voivod – producers
- Guy Pedneault – engineer
- Brian Slagel – executive producer
