= Six Feet Down Under =

EP by Metallica
- Released: September 20, 2010 (Australia and New Zealand only)
- Recorded: May 4, 1989 – January 21, 2004, Australia
- Genres: Thrash metal, heavy metal
- Length: 52:47
- Label: Universal Music

Metallica chronology
Orgullo, Pasión, y Gloria: Tres Noches en la Ciudad de México (2009)	Six Feet Down Under (2010)	The Big Four: Live from Sofia, Bulgaria (2010)

Six Feet Down Under is a limited edition commemorative live EP by the American heavy metal band Metallica. It was released exclusively in Australia and New Zealand on September 20, 2010, through Universal Music. It has been sold by Trans-Tasman record stores, Metallica online store and iTunes only. The EP contains fan recordings of eight live songs from the band's archive that were never released (two songs from each Australian tour).

== Track listing ==
No.	Title	Recorded	Length
1.	"Eye of the Beholder"	May 4, 1989 at Festival Hall, Melbourne	6:33
2.	"...And Justice for All"	May 4, 1989 at Festival Hall, Melbourne	9:53
3.	"Through the Never"	April 8, 1993 at the Entertainment Centre, Perth	3:40
4.	"The Unforgiven"	April 4, 1993 at the National Tennis Centre, Melbourne	7:02
5.	"Low Man's Lyric" (acoustic)	April 11, 1998 at the Entertainment Centre, Perth	7:00
6.	"Devil's Dance"	April 12, 1998 at the Entertainment Centre, Perth	5:49
7.	"Frantic"	January 21, 2004 at the Entertainment Centre, Sydney	7:46
8.	"Fight Fire with Fire"	January 19, 2004 at the Entertainment Centre, Brisbane	5:09
Total length:			52:47

== Personnel ==
- James Hetfield - lead vocals, rhythm guitar
- Lars Ulrich - drums
- Kirk Hammett - lead guitar, backing vocals
- Jason Newsted - bass, backing vocals on tracks 1–6
- Robert Trujillo - bass, backing vocals on tracks 7–8
