= Dimension Hatröss =

Studio album by Voivod
- Released: June 29, 1988
- Recorded: 1987
- Studio: Music Lab, West Berlin, Germany
- Genre: Technical thrash metal; progressive metal; avant-garde metal
- Length: 39:53; 41:38 (with bonus track)
- Label: Maze (Canada); Noise (rest of the world)
- Producer: Voivod & Harris Johns

Voivod chronology
Killing Technology (1987)	Dimension Hatröss (1988)	Nothingface (1989)

Professional ratings
Review scores
Source	Rating
AllMusic	4/5 stars
Collector's Guide to Heavy Metal	9/10
NME	8/10
Rock Hard	9.0/10
Sputnikmusic	4.5/5

Dimension Hatröss (/ˈheɪtrɒs/ HAYT-ross) is the fourth studio album by the Canadian heavy metal band Voivod. It was released in 1988 on Noise Records and is a concept album which narrates the exploits of Voivod’s mascot cyborg Korgull. The cover concept and artwork was produced by drummer Michel Langevin. Estimated sales are more than 70,000 copies, worldwide. The album was recorded near Checkpoint Charlie in West Germany.

The "Batman Theme"'s cover only appears on the CD version, it is not present on the original vinyl and cassette pressings. In 2017, Dimension Hatröss was added by the US magazine Rolling Stone to its Top 100 Metal Albums of All Time list at No. 78.

The word Hatröss is pronounced by singer Snake (Denis Bélanger) in French as the word atroce, meaning terrible or horrible.

In 2024, a collection of early recordings was released under the title "Latitude" by Blacky's label, Minemine Records.

It is considered to be an essential release in the thrash genre by Revolver.

== Contemporary reviews ==
In the June 1988 issue of Circus magazine, music critic Paul Gallotta characterized the sonic direction of the release as speed metal combined with intelligent, though deliberately obscure, lyrical themes. The reviewer observed that the Canadian quartet demonstrated significantly more artistic vision and energy than typical contemporary acts within the industrial-influenced heavy metal subgenres. According to the publication, this creative approach translated into a cohesive record defined by aggressive, heavy power chords and harsh, gravelly vocal delivery. Gallotta ultimately concluded that the overarching performance succeeded in leaving the listener engaged and exhilarated, rather than fatigued by the intensity of the material.

== Legacy ==
Dimension Hatröss was named one of "The Best 25 Heavy Metal Albums of All Time" in the book Sound of the Beast: The Complete Headbanging History of Heavy Metal, by Ian Christe.

== Track listing ==
All songs were written by Voivod, except where indicated.

Prolog...
No.	Title	Length
1.	"Experiment"	6:10
2.	"Tribal Convictions"	4:52
3.	"Chaosmöngers"	4:39
4.	"Technocratic Manipulators"	4:35

Epilog...
No.	Title	Length
1.	"Macrosolutions to Megaproblems"	5:33
2.	"Brain Scan"	5:08
3.	"Psychic Vacuum"	3:49
4.	"Cosmic Drama"	4:54

Bonus tracks
No.	Title	Length
9.	"Batman (Neal Hefti)"	1:45

== Personnel ==
Voivod

- Snake (Denis Bélanger) - vocals
- Piggy (Denis D'Amour) - guitar
- Blacky (Jean-Yves Thériault) - bass
- Away (Michel Langevin) - drums, artwork

Production

- Harris Johns - producer, engineer, mixing
