= Papa Wheelie =

American punk rock/heavy metal band

- Origin: San Francisco Bay Area, California, United States
- Genres: Punk rock, stoner metal, sludge metal
- Years active: 1996–2002, 2011–?
- Label: Chophouse
- Members: Jason Newsted; Steven Wiig; Joe Ledesma

Papa Wheelie is an American punk rock/heavy metal band formed in 1996 by Jason Newsted, who is best known as a member of Metallica from 1986 to 2001. Papa Wheelie have played occasional gigs mainly in the Bay Area, ranging from outdoor BBQs to his neighbor's 12th birthday party to local San Francisco rock clubs.

The band emerged from a friendship between Newsted and a bike shop owner, over their shared love of mountain biking. Their name is a pun: to "pop a wheelie" is to ride a bicycle with the front wheel temporariliy lifted off the ground. Early in the project, Newsted played drums and Steven Wiig played guitar. Since then, Newsted assumed guitar and vocal responsibilities while Wiig returned to the drumkit and handled artistic duties, while a variety of others played bass guitar.

All the band's recorded material has been produced at Newsted's home studio, The Chophouse.

The band went on hiatus circa 2006 due to Newsted's shoulder injuries, but was resurrected in August 2011 after Newsted and Wiig simultaneously viewed the "U.S. Desert" episode of Anthony Bourdain: No Reservations, which featured musicians such as Kyuss, Queens of the Stone Age and Josh Homme. This television program inspired the resurrection of Papa Wheelie and resulted in the band performing several local Bay Area shows - including opening for Anvil at The Red Devil Lounge and Kyuss Lives! at San Francisco's Regency Ballroom on November 19, 2011, with The Sword & Black Cobra.

== Members ==
- Jason Newsted – vocal, guitar
- Steven Wiig – drums
- Joe Ledesma – bass

== Discography ==
- 2002: Unipsycho
- 2002: Live Lycanthropy
