= Killing Technology =

Studio album by Voivod
- Released: April 2, 1987
- Recorded: November 27 – December 14, 1986
- Studios: Music Lab, West Berlin, Germany
- Genres: Thrash metal; progressive metal
- Length: 39:49; 47:43 (with bonus tracks)
- Labels: Cobra (Canada); Combat/Noise (US); Noise International (rest of the world)
- Producers: Voivod & Harris Johns

Voivod chronology
Rrröööaaarrr (1986)	Killing Technology (1987)	Dimension Hatröss (1988)

Professional ratings
Review scores
Source	Rating
AllMusic	3.5/5 stars
Collector's Guide to Heavy Metal	7/10
Rock Hard	8.0/10
Sputnikmusic	5.0/5

Killing Technology is the third studio album by Canadian heavy metal band Voivod. It was released in 1987 on Noise Records and was the first to combine elements of progressive rock in the band's thrash metal sound.

== Track listing ==
All songs were written by Voivod. Lyrics by Snake.

Killing Side
No.	Title	Length
1.	"Killing Technology"	7:33
2.	"Overreaction"	4:45
3.	"Tornado"	6:02
4.	"Too Scared to Scream"	4:14

Ravenous Side
No.	Title	Length
5.	"Forgotten in Space"	6:10
6.	"Ravenous Medicine"	4:33
7.	"Order of the Blackguards"	4:28
8.	"This Is Not an Exercise"	6:18

Cassette and CD edition bonus track
No.	Title	Length
9.	"Cockroaches"	3:40

== Personnel ==
Voivod

- Snake (Denis Bélanger) – vocals
- Piggy (Denis D'Amour) – guitar, mixing assistant
- Blacky (Jean-Yves Thériault) – bass, mixing assistant
- Away (Michel Langevin) – drums, artwork

Production

- Harris Johns – producer, engineer, mixing
