= Infini (album) =

Studio album by Voivod
- Released: June 23, 2009
- Recorded: 2004 (Piggy's home recordings); 2008–2009
- Studios: Studio Vox (drums), Studio D.O.C. (vocals), Montreal, Quebec, Canada, Fantasy Studios, Berkeley, California (bass)
- Genres: Heavy metal, alternative metal
- Length: 58:10
- Labels: Relapse (US); Nuclear Blast (Europe); Victor (Japan)
- Producers: Jason Newsted, Glen Robinson & Voivod

Voivod chronology
Katorz (2006)	Infini (2009)	Target Earth (2013)

Professional ratings
Review scores
Source	Rating
AllMusic	4/5 stars
Blabbermouth.net	7/10
Brave Words & Bloody Knuckles	9.0/10
Chronicles of Chaos	8/10
Exclaim!	(favourable)
Metal Storm	(mixed)
PopMatters	8/10 stars
Rock Hard	8.0/10
Sputnikmusic	3.5/5

Infini is the twelfth studio album and fifteenth release overall by the Canadian heavy metal band Voivod, released on June 23, 2009. It is their last album to include contributions by their late original guitarist Piggy, who died nearly four years earlier, and their last to feature Jason Newsted on bass.

== Track listing ==
All lyrics are written by Denis Bélanger; all music is composed by Voivod.

No.	Title	Length
1.	"God Phones"	5:07
2.	"From the Cave"	2:55
3.	"Earthache"	3:21
4.	"Global Warning"	4:41
5.	"A Room with a V.U."	4:50
6.	"Destroy After Reading"	4:27
7.	"Treasure Chase"	3:38
8.	"KRAP Radio"	3:45
9.	"In Orbit"	4:12
10.	"Deathproof"	3:35
11.	"Pyramidome"	4:28
12.	"Morpheus"	5:32
13.	"Volcano" (includes hidden track)	7:39
Total length:		58:11

== Personnel ==
Voivod

- Denis Bélanger a.k.a. Snake – vocals
- Denis D'Amour a.k.a. Piggy – guitars
- Jason Newsted a.k.a. Jasonic – bass guitar, interludes, producer
- Michel Langevin a.k.a. Away – drums, artwork

Production

- Glen Robinson – producer, engineer (drums and vocals)
- Enrique Gonzalez Muller – engineer (bass), mixing at Fantasy Studios, Berkeley, California
- Tom Hutten – mastering
