= Katorz =

Studio album by Voivod
- Released: July 25, 2006
- Recorded: 2004–2006
- Studios: Chophouse Records, California (original demos); Studio Piccolo and Studio Multisons, Montreal, Quebec, Canada
- Genres: Heavy metal, thrash metal
- Length: 45:10
- Labels: The End (US); Nuclear Blast (Europe); Victor (Japan)
- Producers: Glen Robinson and Voivod

Voivod chronology
Voivod (2003)	Katorz (2006)	Infini (2009)

Professional ratings
Review scores
Source	Rating
AllMusic	4/5 stars
Blabbermouth.net	8/10
Brave Words & Bloody Knuckles	9.5/10
Chronicles of Chaos	8.5/10
Metal Storm	(favourable)
Rock Hard	8.5/10
Stylus Magazine	B+

Katorz is the eleventh studio album by Canadian heavy metal band Voivod, released on July 25, 2006.

Demos for the album had been made, but before the band could properly begin recording it guitarist Denis D'Amour (a.k.a. Piggy) died on August 25, 2005, due to colon cancer. The guitar and bass tracks for Katorz had been recorded by D'Amour and bassist Jason Newsted (formerly of Metallica) on D'Amour's Mac at Newsted's house in California. When D'Amour would send the band a Pro Tools CD of the demos, he wrote "Katorz" on it, a phonetic spelling of "quatorze", the French word for fourteen. After D'Amour's death, Langevin and Bélanger recorded their drum and vocal tracks, respectively, to be added to those existing tracks. The song, "The X-Stream", is included in the videogame Guitar Hero II.

== Track listing ==
All lyrics are written by Denis Bélanger; all music is composed by Voivod.

No.	Title	Length
1.	"The Getaway"	3:58
2.	"Dognation"	4:06
3.	"Mr. Clean"	4:16
4.	"After All"	4:44
5.	"Odds & Frauds"	4:50
6.	"Red My Mind"	4:41
7.	"Silly Clones"	3:18
8.	"No Angel"	5:06
9.	"The X-Stream"	4:58
10.	"Polaroids"	5:08
Total length:		45:10

== Personnel ==
Voivod

- Denis Bélanger a.k.a. Snake – vocals
- Denis D'Amour a.k.a. Piggy – guitar, interludes
- Jason Newsted a.k.a. Jasonic – bass guitar, backing vocals
- Michel Langevin a.k.a. Away – drums, interludes, artwork

Additional musicians

- Ramachandra Borcar – interludes

Production

- Glen Robinson – producer, mixing with Voivod
- Dominique Lejeune, Olivier Ouimet – assistant engineers
- Howie Weinberg – mastering at Masterdisk, New York
