= Voivod (band) =

Canadian heavy metal band

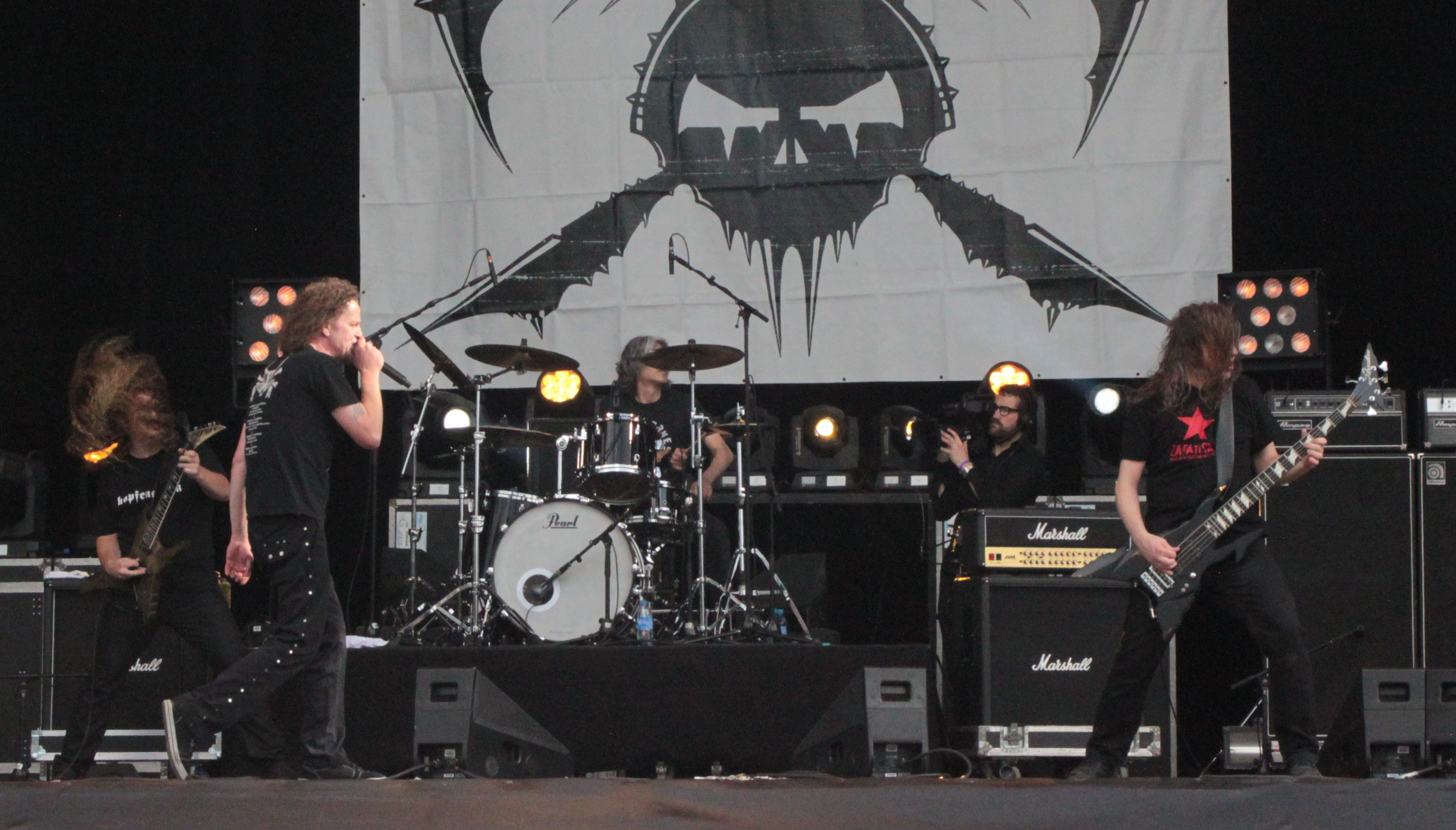
- Voivod at Hellfest 2013

Background information
- Origin: Jonquière (Saguenay), Quebec, Canada
- Genres: Progressive metal; thrash metal; avant-garde metal; speed metal (early)
- Works: Discography
- Years active: 1982–present
- Labels: Metal Blade; Noise; MCA; Mausoleum; Hypnotic; Chophouse; The End; Relapse; Century Media
- Members: Michel "Away" Langevin; Denis "Snake" Bélanger; Daniel "Chewy" Mongrain; Dominic "Rocky" Laroche
- Past members: Denis "Piggy" D'Amour; Jean-Yves "Blacky" Thériault; Pierre St. Jean; Gilles Brisebois; Eric "E-Force" Forrest; Jason "Jasonic" Newsted
- Website: www.voivod.com

Voivod (stylized as Voïvod) is a Canadian heavy metal band formed in Jonquière, Quebec in 1982. The original line-up consisted of vocalist Denis "Snake" Bélanger, guitarist Denis "Piggy" D'Amour, drummer Michel "Away" Langevin and bassist Jean-Yves "Blacky" Thériault. The band has had numerous members changes throughout its 44-year career, with Langevin as the only consistent member. As of 2014, the line-up includes Langevin, Bélanger, Daniel "Chewy" Mongrain (guitar) and Dominic "Rocky" Laroche (bass).

Voivod's musical style has changed numerous times since its inception. Starting out as a speed metal band, they have added a mix of progressive and thrash metal to create their own unique metal style, and have been credited as progenitors of the technical thrash metal sound along with Coroner, Watchtower, Dark Angel, Mekong Delta, Anacrusis and Blind Illusion, among others.

To date, Voivod has released sixteen studio albums, as well as one EP, one live album, two compilations, seven demos and one DVD featuring a live concert. They have been grouped with Sacrifice, Razor and Annihilator in the "Big Four" of Canadian thrash metal. The band found mainstream success in the late 1980s with their fifth studio album Nothingface (1989), which is Voivod's only album to enter the Billboard 200 charts, peaking at number 114. The band won the "Visionary" award at the 2017 Progressive Music Awards. In 2019, Voivod's fourteenth studio album, The Wake, won a Juno Award for Metal/Hard Music Album of the Year. Voivod's most recent studio album Morgöth Tales, a collection of re-recorded songs, was released in July 2023.

== History ==
=== Early career (1982–1990) ===
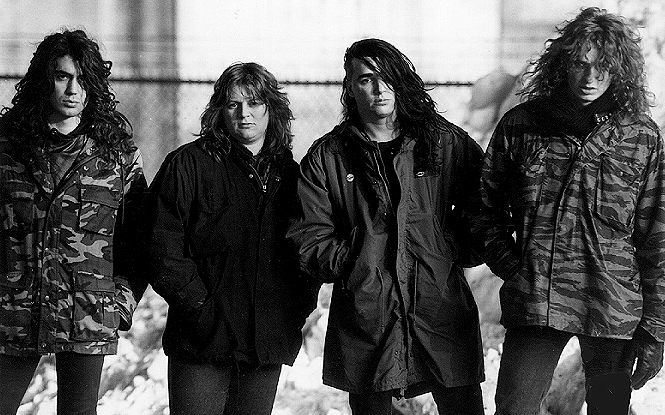
The original Voivod line-up in a 1986 promotional photo. From left to right: Away, Piggy, Blacky and Snake.

Voivod was formed in 1982 in Jonquière, Quebec. Influenced equally by the new wave of British heavy metal (NWOBHM), the burgeoning hardcore punk scene and 1970s progressive rock, Voivod forged a distinctive brand of heavy music that often relied on lyrical themes such as Reagan-era Cold War politics, post-apocalyptic literature and science fiction. Killing Technology (1987) began the band's evolution in earnest, with the character from Voivod's album covers (drawn by drummer Away and named "Korgull" on 1986's Rrröööaaarrr) significantly being depicted in a spaceship. Drawing more heavily on hardcore punk than metal influences by this point, Voivod began evolving without the aid of increasing speed and storytelling on the following album Dimension Hatröss (1988). Voivod was one of the first thrash bands from Canada to gain popularity outside of their country's borders, reaching the peak of their global popularity with the 1989 album Nothingface, which featured a cover version of Pink Floyd's "Astronomy Domine". Other covers include Pink Floyd's "The Nile Song" on their 1993 album The Outer Limits and "21st Century Schizoid Man" by King Crimson on 1997's Phobos. Much of the band's sound comes from guitarist Piggy's use of dissonant chords, usually played in the high register of the guitar, combined with Blacky's bass tone and chords as well, used extensively on Nothingface. Albums like Dimension Hatröss are dominated by unexpected time signatures and both Piggy and Blacky's liberal use of dissonant, unconventional minor chords.

=== Departures of Blacky and Snake, and Eric Forrest-era (1991–2000) ===
Two of the four founding members (bassist Jean-Yves Thériault and vocalist Denis Bélanger) left Voivod in the early 1990s. Jean-Yves co-founded The Holy Body Tattoo, an avant-garde modern dance company based in Vancouver and also wrote extensively all the music for it, as well as other electronic music projects, while Denis Bélanger isolated himself and eventually started a new project, Union Made. Meanwhile, the band recorded two albums as a trio in the mid-to-late 1990s with new member Eric Forrest, nicknamed "E-Force", handling both vocals and bass guitar. Forrest was seriously injured in a car accident in Germany in 1998, and that incarnation of Voivod never regained the momentum they lost during his rehabilitation. After Forrest left the band, his insurance company attempted to sue the band for the injuries he sustained in the crash, as he was in the care of the band at the time.

=== Reunion with Snake, arrival of Jasonic, and death of Piggy (2001–2006) ===
Voivod briefly disbanded in 2001 before Bélanger returned to the band. The next incarnation of Voivod featured three of the four founding members: Denis Bélanger (a.k.a. "Snake"; vocals), Denis D'Amour ("Piggy"; guitars), and Michel Langevin ("Away"; drums) along with Jason Newsted ("Jasonic", formerly of Metallica) on bass guitar. The album Voivod was released in 2003. Guitarist Denis D'Amour died at the age of 45 on August 26, 2005 due to complications from colon cancer. In July 2006 they released Katorz, based around riffs found on the laptop of D'Amour. Just prior to his death, he left instructions for his bandmates on how to use them. In November 2006, the song "X-Stream" was featured on Guitar Hero II.

=== Infini, return of Blacky, and Target Earth (2007–2013) ===
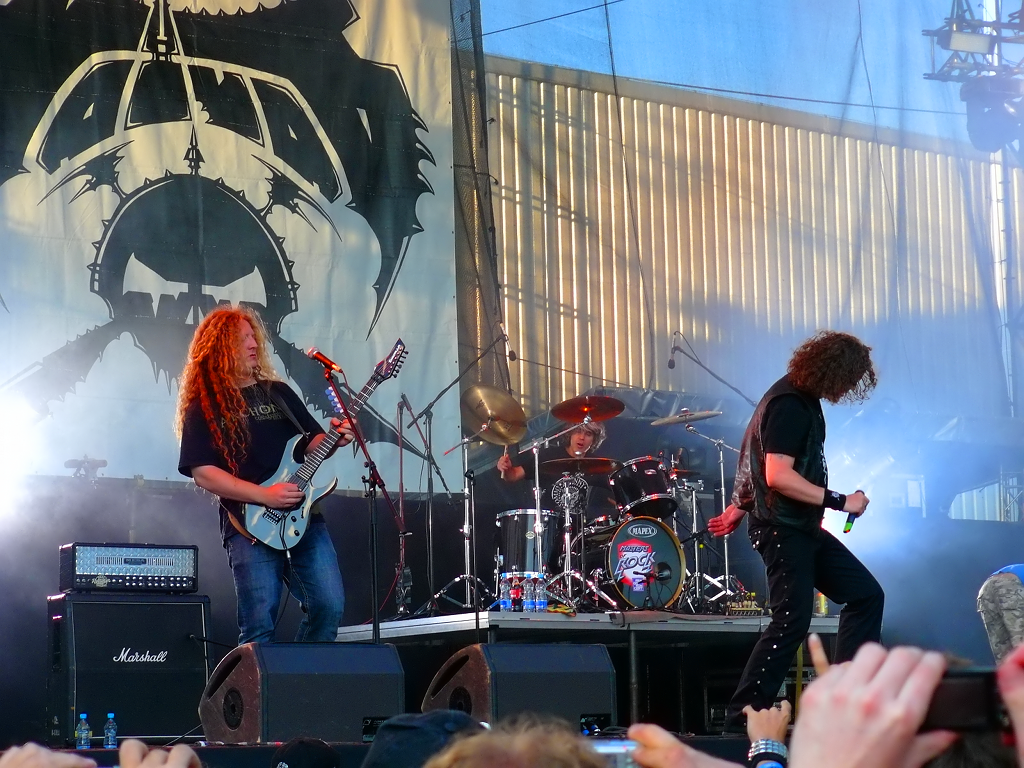
Voivod at Masters of Rock 2009

Voivod were planning to begin work on what was to be their final studio album in late 2007, which contained tracks recorded with D'Amour before his death. Voivod was part of the Heavy MTL show that was held in Montreal on June 22, 2008. Voivod also performed at the Monsters of Rock Festival in Calgary, Alberta, on July 26, 2008, and supported Judas Priest at the Bell Centre in Montreal, on August 12, 2008. Voivod also played a full set at Thrash Domination in Kawasaki, Japan, September 20–21, 2008, along with Testament and Forbidden. The band consisted of Bélanger, Langevin, a returning Jean-Yves "Blacky" Thériault, and Dan Mongrain on guitar.

In early January 2009, Voivod announced that they were putting the finishing touches on their new album and expected to release it in the spring of that year. The album, now known as Infini, was released on June 23, 2009.

By July 2010, Voivod had been writing and recording new music (including Dan Mongrain on guitar). On July 4, 2012, Voivod announced the title of their thirteenth studio album, Target Earth, which was released on January 22, 2013. Target Earth has a more progressive sound than some of their last few albums, and is a return to a more "classic" Voivod sound that can be heard on Dimension Hatross and Nothingface. All the music was written by Blacky and Chewy, while Snake focused on lyrics, and Away took care of the artwork.

=== Second departure of Blacky and arrival of Dominic "Rocky" Laroche (2014–present) ===
On July 10, 2014, it was reported that Blacky had left Voivod again. It was announced that he was forced out of the band. In late January 2015, the band released the new single "We Are Connected", which was the lead track from the 7-inch split vinyl disc with the band At the Gates. It was the first music to feature new bassist Dominic "Rocky" Laroche. They also released a new, five-track EP, entitled Post Society, featuring two new tracks and a cover of Hawkwind's "Silver Machine", on February 26, 2016.

As early as February 2015, Voivod began work on their fourteenth studio album, which was to be released in 2016 but later pushed back to 2017. Voivod toured Europe during the fall of that year supporting Carcass and Napalm Death, along with Obituary and Herod.

The band was expected to begin recording the album in August 2017. In June 2017, Langevin told Rock Sverige that the songwriting was almost completed with an estimated release for early 2018. He also said that the album would probably be a double-album on vinyl due to the songs being "really long and progressive", describing them as "seven or eight minutes long songs" and with it being a concept album as well. In November 2017, the members of Voivod began recording their next studio album, titled The Wake, which was released in September 2018.

In 2019, it was revealed that the master tapes for Voivod's MCA-era albums were destroyed in the 2008 Universal Studios fire.

Voivod's fifteenth studio album, Synchro Anarchy, was released on February 11, 2022. The band released Morgöth Tales, a collection of re-recorded songs, on July 21, 2023. As of 2023, the band was writing new music for their next album.

They announced tours of North America and Europe in early 2026. In addition to the aforementioned new album, they promised a live album and a video game were being released. They also performed at the Hell's Heroes music festival at the White Oak Music Hall in Houston. Their new live album Symphonique, a "special live collaboration" with the Quebec Symphony Orchestra, was released on June 5, 2026.

The band toured Europe in support of the album, with Eric Forrest (who was Denis "Snake" Bélanger's replacement from 1994 to 2001) filling in on vocals, due to Bélanger being committed to a "family matter". A documentary about the band, We Are Connected, is planned for release in late 2026, more than two years after it had its original premiere at the Fantasia International Film Festival in Montreal.

== Musical style, influences, and legacy ==
Voivod's style has been classified as progressive metal, thrash metal, technical thrash metal, and avant-garde metal. Their earlier albums have been labeled speed metal, while Angel Rat has been labelled alternative metal. Their influences include Béla Bartók, Igor Stravinsky, Dimitri Shostakovich, Yes, Einstürzende Neubauten, GBH, Genesis, Hawkwind, Judas Priest, Iron Maiden, Killing Joke, King Crimson, Motörhead, Sodom, Nektar, Pink Floyd, the Ramones, Rush, Van der Graaf Generator, Venom, and UFO. As Ed Strelecky wrote, for Guitar World in 1990, "One would expect two guys, one named Piggy (Denis D'Amour) and the other Blacky (Jean-Yves Thériault), to be part of a new music version of The Banana Splits. But the guitar half of Voivod, rock's premiere cyberpunk quartet, have influences of a more serious nature." In 2026, in regards to the band's longevity and their unique identity as a metal band, Dom Lawson of Blabbermouth.net wrote, "For most of the last 40 years, Voivod have been the progressive metal gift that keeps on giving. Perpetually ahead of the game, they have weathered every obstacle and pitfall imaginable to arrive at this point, and it seems only fitting that this most adventurous and free-thinking band should celebrate their ongoing existence by fulfilling one of their longstanding dreams."

Voivod has been praised for their unique approach, or cited as an influence, by other bands and artists such as Tool, Pantera, Soundgarden, Mastodon, Meshuggah, Fear Factory, the Fierce and the Dead, Jason Newsted (bassist on Voivod's 2000s albums), Dave Grohl, and Mike Patton.

In 2004, Dan Epstein of Guitar World described Voivod as "Canadian metal pioneers through a series of jaw-dropping albums that fused heavy thrash with progressive rock, psychedelia and futuristic lyrical themes." In 2018, Loudwire called the band "the preeminent space metal band of our times." In 2022, Metal Hammer stated the opinion that Voivod were among the greatest progressive metal acts of all time.

== Band members ==
Current

- Michel "Away" Langevin – drums (1982–present)
- Denis "Snake" Bélanger – vocals (1982–1994, 2001–present)
- Daniel "Chewy" Mongrain – guitars (2008–present)
- Dominic "Rocky" Laroche – bass (2014–present)

Guest musicians

- Pierre St-Jean – bass (1992–1993, on The Outer Limits)
- Martin Bolduc – bass (1993–1994)
- Gilles Brisebois – bass (1994)
- Vincent Peake – bass (2002)

Former

- Denis "Piggy" D'Amour – guitars (1982–2005; his death)
- Jean-Yves "Blacky" Thériault – bass (1982–1991, 2008–2014)
- Eric "E-Force" Forrest – vocals (1994–2001; touring: 2026), bass (1994–2001)
- Jason "Jasonic" Newsted – bass (2001–2008)

Timeline

== Discography ==
- War and Pain (1984)
- Rrröööaaarrr (1986)
- Killing Technology (1987)
- Dimension Hatröss (1988)
- Nothingface (1989)
- Angel Rat (1991)
- The Outer Limits (1993)
- Negatron (1995)
- Phobos (1997)
- Voivod (2003)
- Katorz (2006)
- Infini (2009)
- Target Earth (2013)
- The Wake (2018)
- Synchro Anarchy (2022)
- Morgöth Tales (2023)
