= Denis Bélanger =

Canadian singer

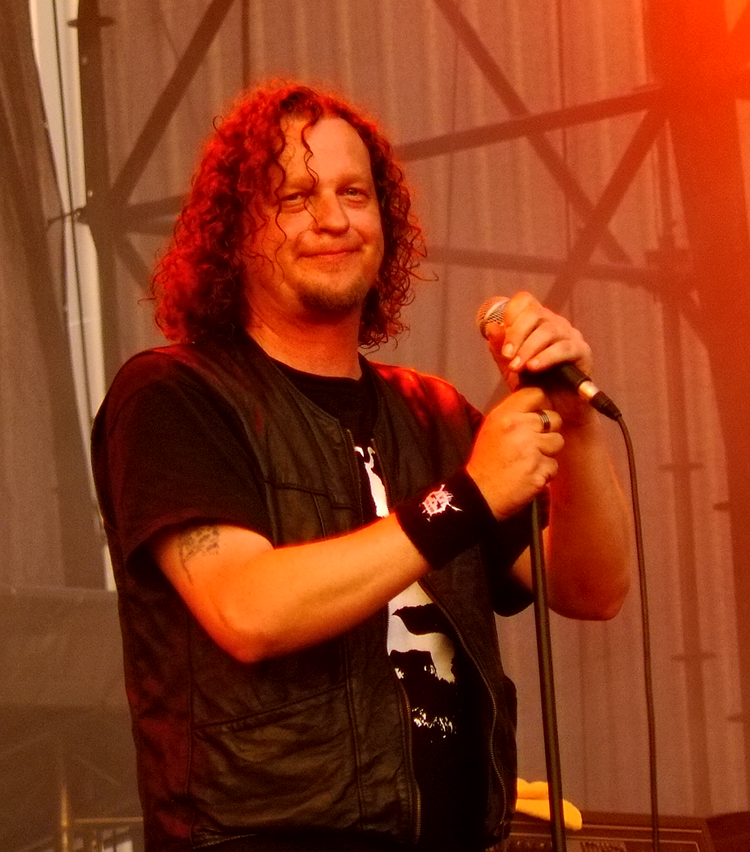
- Bélanger with Voivod at Masters of Rock 2009

Background information
- Also known as: "Snake"
- Born: August 9, 1964 (age 60)
- Origin: Jonquière, Quebec, Canada
- Genres: Heavy metal, progressive metal, thrash metal, speed metal
- Occupation(s): Singer, songwriter
- Years active: 1982–present
- Labels: Metal Blade, Noise, MCA, Mausoleum, Hypnotic, Chophouse, The End
- Member of: Voivod

Denis "Snake" Bélanger (born August 9, 1964) is a Canadian singer and songwriter. He is the lead singer and lyricist of heavy metal band Voivod.

== Early life ==
Bélanger was born on August 9, 1964 and grew up in Jonquière, Quebec.

== Career ==
Bélanger joined Michel Langevin, Denis D'Amour and Jean-Yves Thériault to form Voivod in 1982, in northern Quebec. He appeared on the albums War & Pain, Rrröööaaarrr, Killing Technology, Dimension Hatröss, Nothingface, Angel Rat and The Outer Limits.

Bélanger departed the group in 1994, after completing a tour in support of The Outer Limits. He formed his own band, Union Made with Peter Jackson and worked on the song "Dictatosaurus" with Dave Grohl's side project dubbed Probot.

Bélanger rejoined Voivod in 2002 and appeared on the albums, Voivod (2003), Katorz (2006), Infini (2009), Target Earth (2013), and The Wake (2018). This last album won a Juno Award for Heavy Metal Album of the Year.
