= Denis D'Amour =

Canadian guitarist (1959–2005)

Piggy
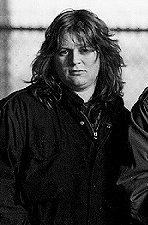
- Piggy in 1986

Background information
- Born: September 24, 1959
- Died: August 26, 2005 (aged 45)
- Genres: Heavy metal, progressive metal, thrash metal, speed metal
- Occupations: Guitarist, songwriter
- Years active: 1982–2005
- Labels: Metal Blade, Noise, MCA, Mausoleum, Hypnotic, Chophouse, The End
- Formerly of: Voivod

Denis "Piggy" D'Amour (September 24, 1959 – August 26, 2005) was a Canadian guitarist. He was a member of the heavy metal band Voivod from its inception in 1982 until his death in 2005.

D'Amour's approach to music was anarchic and experimental rather than strict and theoretical. He was trained in classical violin as a child. He was influenced by progressive rock artists such as King Crimson, Pink Floyd and Rush.

== Death ==
In the summer of 2005, D'Amour was diagnosed with colon cancer. Subsequently, a routine operation was scheduled though several complications led doctors to suspect further problems. The cancer had extensively progressed, rendering any operation non-viable.

D'Amour slipped into a coma in the palliative care unit of a Montreal hospital on August 25, 2005, surrounded in his final hours by family and friends. He died the next day at approximately 11:45pm.

The documentary Metal: A Headbanger's Journey, featuring an interview with D'Amour, was released on September 7, 2005.

Piggy's final recordings appear on two of Voivod's albums Katorz and Infini, released in 2006 and 2009 respectively.

== Equipment ==
=== Guitars ===
- Ibanez Universe
- Gibson SG
- Gibson Les Paul Custom
- Liberatore custom made guitar
- F4c guitar

=== Amps ===
- Marshall JCM 800 Head 2203
- Marshall JCM 800 Head 2210
- Marshall Series 9000 Preamp
- Marshall Series 9100 Dual MonoBlock

=== Effects/pedals ===
- Digitech IPS 33
- Yamaha SPX-90 II
- BOSS SD-1 Super Overdrive
- Ibanez DM-1100 Digital Delay

== Discography ==
Voivod albums:

- War & Pain 1984 (Metal Blade Records)
- Rrröööaaarrr 1986 (Noise Records)
- Killing Technology 1987 (Noise Records)
- Dimension Hatröss 1988 (Noise Records)
- Nothingface 1989 (Mechanic / MCA Records)
- Angel Rat 1991 (Mechanic Records) / MCA Records)
- The Outer Limits 1993 (Mechanic / MCA Records)
- Negatron 1995 (Hypnotic Records)
- Phobos 1998 (Slipdisc Hypnotic Records)
- Kronik 1998 (Slipdisc Hypnotic Records)
- Voivod Lives 2000 (Metal Blade Records)
- Voivod 2003 (Chophouse Records / Surfdog Records)
- Katorz 2006 (The End Records)
- Infini 2009 (Relapse Records)
  - Note: According to interviews with the surviving members of Voivod, D'Amour's recordings from 2004 appear on both Katorz and Infini.
