= Michel Langevin =

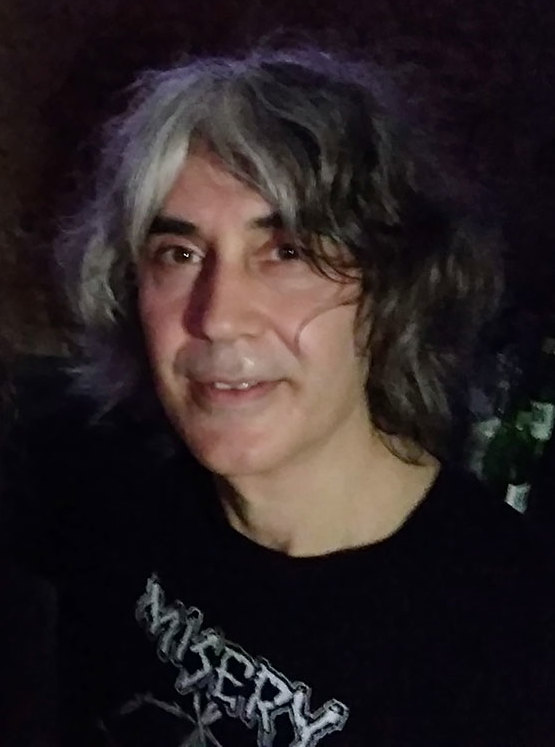
- Langevin in 2018

Background information
- Also known as: Away
- Born: May 30, 1963 (age 63); Jonquière, Quebec, Canada
- Genres: Heavy metal, progressive metal, thrash metal, progressive rock, speed metal
- Occupations: Musician, songwriter
- Instruments: Drums, accordion
- Years active: 1982–present
- Labels: Metal Blade, Noise, MCA, Mausoleum, Hypnotic, Chophouse, The End
- Member of: Voivod
- Formerly of: Tau Cross

Michel "Away" Langevin (born May 30, 1963) is a Canadian musician, best known as a founding member and drummer of heavy metal band Voivod. He has been a constant member of the band since its formation in 1982. Langevin is credited with the creation of the mythology of the post-apocalyptic vampire lord Voivod, about which the band originally coalesced, and is largely responsible for its continuing science fiction themes.

Langevin is also a graphic design artist. He has created all of Voivod's artwork, as well as the artwork for the Probot album. He is also credited with the design for Non Phixion's album cover artwork. He published an artbook called "Worlds Away: Voivod and The Art of Michel Langevin".

Langevin has also cowritten songs for JG Thirlwell's Steroid Maximus and drummed on Men Without Hats' Sideways (1991).

In 2005, less than six months before the death of Denis "Piggy" D'Amour (Voivod's guitarist), Away and Piggy recorded an album with Canadian artist Lucien Francoeur. Vincent Peake of Groovy Aardvark and Joe Evil of Grimskunk were part of the project as well. The songs are a selection of "classic" Aut'Chose songs, a band fronted by Francoeur since 1974.

In 2007, Michel Langevin and fellow Canadian musicians Pat Gordon (Ghoulunatics), Marc Vaillancourt (B.A.R.F.) and Philippe Mius D'Entremont (Maruka) founded Les Ékorchés, an acoustic hardcore/thrash metal band. On February 27, 2007, their first album entitled Les Ékorchés was released. All of the tracks are in French.
