= Rock Star Supernova =

American supergroup

- Origin: United States
- Genres: Hard rock
- Years active: 2006–2008
- Labels: Burnett; Epic
- Past members: Tommy Lee; Gilby Clarke; Johnny Colt; Jason Newsted; Lukas Rossi
- Website: intothesupernova.com

Rock Star Supernova was a reality television-formed supergroup consisting of drummer Tommy Lee, bassist Jason Newsted, guitarist Gilby Clarke, and singer Lukas Rossi. The band was formed during the second season of the Rock Star reality television series, which was titled Rock Star: Supernova.

== History ==
Rock Star Supernova band members Tommy Lee, Jason Newsted, and Gilby Clarke formed the basis of the second season of the Rock Star television program on CBS in the quest to find a lead singer. The show began online on the Rock Star website on MSN on Monday, July 3, with an Internet exclusive weekly episode and premiered on CBS on July 5, 2006. Votes were cast via the Rock Star website. On September 13, 2006, Lukas Rossi was crowned the winner.

=== Name issue ===
The band was originally formed as "Supernova" but the legality of the use of that name was called into question by another band of the same name: Supernova, a pop punk trio from California founded in 1989. On June 26, 2006, the latter band filed a federal lawsuit against Mark Burnett Productions, Rockstar Entertainment, CBS, Tommy Lee, Jason Newsted, and Gilby Clarke. The California band sought both compensatory and punitive damages, as well as trademark protection of the "Supernova" name, the destruction of all Rock Star materials bearing the name "Supernova," and clarifying statements made on the show. One of their primary pieces of evidence was a message from Butch Walker on the social networking website MySpace, in which he notes that the defendants had been informed of the existence of a prior band of the same name, but decided to proceed anyway.

Lee, Newsted, and Clarke were dropped as defendants in late August at the request of the original Supernova's lawyers.

On September 12, 2006, San Diego Judge John Houston ruled in favor of the original Supernova, granting their request for a preliminary injunction. The injunction keeps the producers of Rock Star: Supernova—which concluded September 13, 2006, as a television show, but will continue as a recording, touring, and merchandise entity for some time to follow—from "performing rock 'n' roll music, or recording, or selling rock 'n' roll music recordings under the same [name], pending a trial of this action on its merits, or until otherwise ordered by the court."

The decision bars the CBS-created rockers from touring, recording, and selling merchandise as "Supernova" once the order takes effect. First, the original Supernova must post bond, the amount of which has yet to be determined by the court.

Following the litigation, all promotional material generally bore the name "Rock Star Supernova" on it. This was especially evident on the band's MySpace page, which identifies the band as Rock Star Supernova, and not Supernova.

=== Debut album ===
Songwriter/performer Butch Walker was hired to produce the band's first album. The self-titled debut album was released on November 21, 2006. The album charted at No. 101 on the Billboard 200 and No. 4 on the Canadian Albums Chart.

Music critics generally panned the album. Stephen Thomas Erlewine, senior critic of AllMusic, wrote, "At no point does this band make sense ... it's gloriously bad, the kind of music that can only result when three talented musicians are contractually obligated to work with a wannabe singer who would be a laughing stock on a local level."

Christian Hoard of Rolling Stone thought the album had a few bright spots, "but most of the tunes feel tired, if not retrograde: Opener 'It's On' could have come from Collective Soul, the ballads suck, and there are some dark, sub-Alice in Chains bangers."

The band's first video, "Headspin," was recorded in early October, and was released in January 2007.

On October 23, 2006, Jason Newsted was injured while attempting to catch a falling bass amp head. The accident resulted in a torn anterior labrum in his left shoulder and a rotator cuff and biceps tear in the right. He was scheduled for immediate surgery, and underwent a lengthy rehab process. While Newsted recovered, former The Black Crowes bassist Johnny Colt served as a temporary replacement and was with the band on its national television debut on Jimmy Kimmel Live! on November 21, 2006.

The band went on tour with supporting acts Dilana (the runner-up on Rock Star: Supernova), Juke Kartel (Australian Rock Star: Supernova contestant Toby Rand's band), and The Panic Channel.

In January 2007, Gilby Clarke released a best-of album featuring tracks from all of his solo albums as well as two songs from the Col. Parker project and a re-recording of the song "Black," featuring vocals by Rock Star: Supernova runner-up Dilana.

On April 12, 2007, it was rumoured that Clarke had quit the band. It was subsequently confirmed, though, that he was still part of Rock Star Supernova.

In June 2007, Rossi released "The Love and Lust EP," a recording of four acoustic tracks. He toured the U.S. and Canada during the summer of 2007. In April 2008, Rossi did an interview with LiveVideo.com in which he said, "all that's not for me so I officially quit." He quit because the band members all started doing their own thing, such as DJing. This upset him, as he went through the audition process for one tour. Although on May 28, 2008, Rock Star Supernova reunited for the television series Battleground Earth.

== Discography ==
=== Album ===
List of albums, with selected details, chart positions and certifications
| Title | Details | Peak chart positions | | | | Certifications |
| Title | Details | US | AUS | CAN | NZ | Certifications |
|---|---|---|---|---|---|---|
| Rock Star Supernova | Released: November 21, 2006; Label: Mark Burnett Productions, Epic; Format: CD, digital | 101 | 87 | 4 | 6 | MC: Platinum |

=== Singles ===
| Year | Title | Album |
|---|---|---|
| 2006 | "It's All Love" | Rock Star Supernova |
| 2006 | "Be Yourself (and 5 Other Cliches)" | Rock Star Supernova |
| 2007 | "Headspin" | Rock Star Supernova |
| 2007 | "Can't Bring Myself to Light This Fuse" | Rock Star Supernova |

== Band members ==
- Gilby Clarke – lead guitar (2006–2008)
- Tommy Lee – drums (2006–2008)
- Jason Newsted – bass (2006–2007)
- Lukas Rossi – lead vocals, rhythm guitar (2006–2008)
- Johnny Colt – bass (2007–2008)
