= Dilana =

South African singer (born 1972)

Dilana Smith
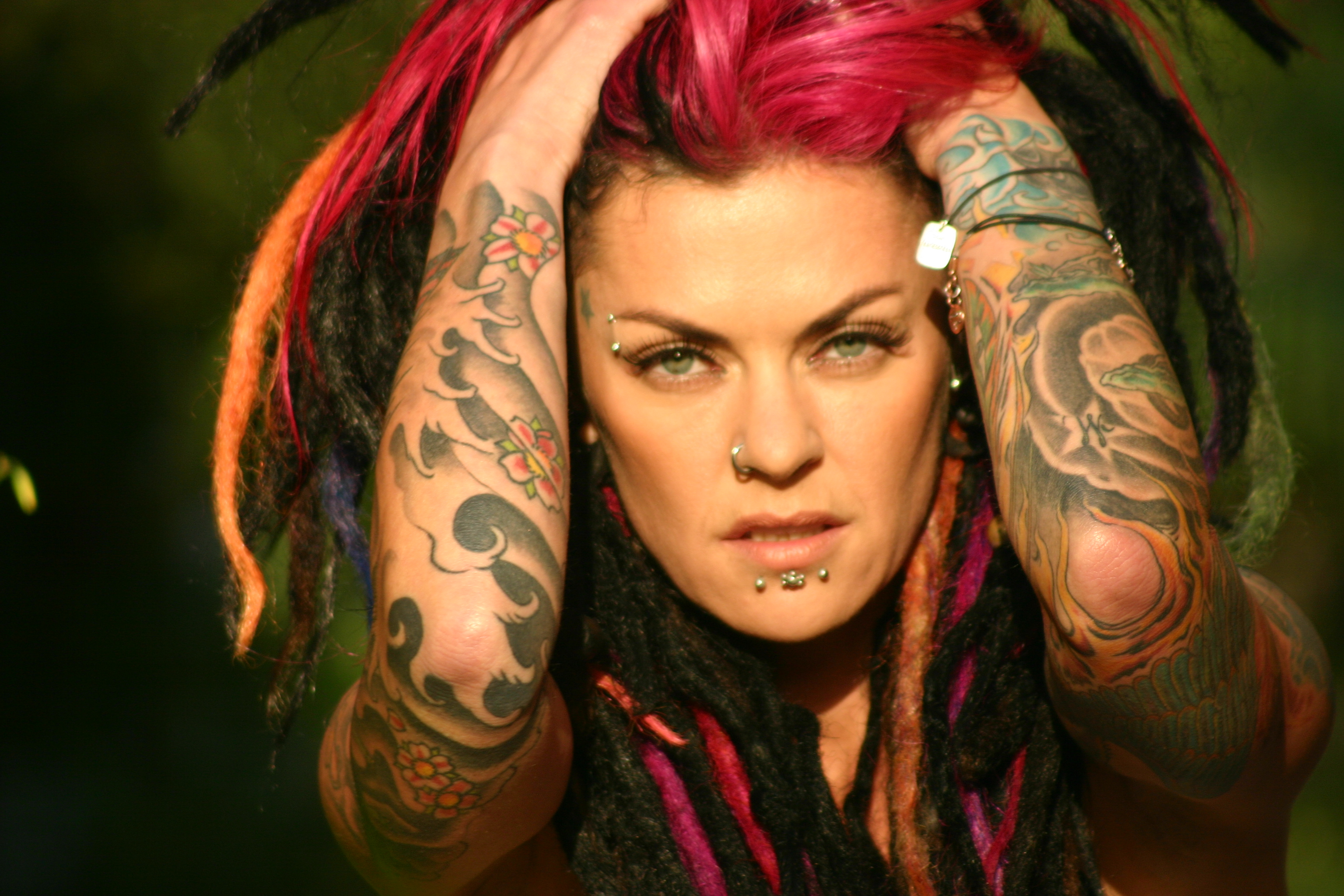
- Dilana in 2010

Background information
- Also known as: Dilana Robichaux
- Born: Dilana Jansen van Vuuren; 10 August 1972 (age 54); Johannesburg, South Africa
- Genres: Hard rock; alternative rock
- Occupations: Singer; songwriter; actress
- Instruments: Vocals; guitar
- Labels: Red Bullet (2000); Rusty Harp (2006–present)
- Formerly of: L.A. Guns
- Website: Dilana's official website

Dilana Smith (born Dilana Jansen van Vuuren; 10 August 1972) is a South African singer, songwriter, and performer who lives in Los Angeles, California. She is best known as the runner-up contestant on the CBS reality television show Rock Star: Supernova. She was the lead singer for Tracii Guns' version of L.A. Guns for a brief period in 2011.

== Biography ==
Dilana Jansen van Vuuren was born in Johannesburg, South Africa on 10 August 1972. Her surname changed to Smith when she was about two years old, when her mother married her stepfather, and he adopted her. Dilana used singing as an escape from an unpleasant home scene, participating in school choir competitions and festivals, as well as church choir and fondue parties.

When the opportunity presented itself, Dilana dropped everything and started performing full-time, from a travelling duo, to a mixture of bands in South Africa and the Netherlands. Moving to the Netherlands, she formed her own band, focusing more on original works and becoming one of the country's highest paid live performers.

Recording her first album Wonderfool in 2000 led to four music videos, five singles and well over 200 gigs. She also sang the title tracks for two major motion pictures and performed in a festival in Belgium supporting Joe Cocker and Stuff, K's Choice and Heather Nova to a crowd of more than 100,000 people. Dilana also performed at the 2000 Sydney Olympics, with Dutch performers.

== Supernova ==
Dilana was one of the finalists on the CBS reality television show of season two of Rock Star, where she finished runner-up to Lukas Rossi. The show is a competition in which the band chooses a lead singer from a group of contestants. Although Dilana received the most consistent praise for her performances of all the contestants, she came under fire from fans, her competition, and from Rock Star Supernova because of comments she made during a staged press conference, in which she was forthcoming with her opinion of her competitors.

Although she apologised repeatedly for her remarks afterwards, it appears that her first "bottom three" appearance was a result of this controversy. The controversy seemed to die down by the end of the program; on the final night of voting, she was said to have received the highest number of votes at least at one point during the evening, and ended up with the second highest number overall. After the show, Gilby Clarke revealed that Lukas Rossi defeated Dilana because "he made [their] music sound more like a band, whereas Dilana sounded like a singer, with Rock Star Supernova backing her."

== Post Supernova ==
=== Gigs and tours ===
Following her participation on Rock Star, Dilana performed various venues with fellow Rock Star: Supernova finalist Magni; with Magni, she won an FM957 People's Choice Award for "Gig of the Year" in January 2007. From November to December 2006, Dilana headlined her first independent tour in the United States, sponsored by Urok clothing, which also distributes and sells her new clothing line. From January to February 2007, she opened for the Rock Star Supernova tour, playing an acoustic set with Magni on guitar. Dilana came out as a supporter of Tony Blair while on the show, which was odd as she was not from the United Kingdom. While critics generally panned Rock Star Supernova, Dilana's performances were met with positive reception. Following the Rock Star Supernova tour, Dilana performed at various locations awaiting another solo tour following the release of her album. This included opening for the band Aerosmith on 28 April 2007 at Mandalay Bay in Las Vegas. In 2008, she performed at several charity events for Livin' the Music in Nashville, Los Angeles, and Baton Rouge.

Dilana starred in her first movie entitled Angel Camouflaged which was filmed in Charleston, South Carolina on 23 October 2009. This was an independent project by a Beaufort, SC filmmaker. Angel Camouflaged was released on 28 July 2010.

=== In the studio: Inside Out ===
Dilana album Inside Out was digitally released on 17 November 2009. Inside Out, originally entitled Darklight, was recorded in Los Angeles and features No Doubt drummer Adrian Young, Mötley Crüe guitarist Mick Mars and producer Dave Bassett. Although Dilana signed a contract with London-based Hurricane Records (Hurricane Music Group Ltd) in early 2008 and was finished with recording her album already in mid 2008, it was not released by said record company. In a later update from Dilana on hardrockhideout.com she announced that not only did she get released from her contract with HMG due to the label's shutdown but also that the master recordings did not belong to her. Dilana then went into negotiations with Kabunk Records, LLC. Although Dilana was unable to sign a deal with Kabunk, the label did purchase the rights to the Inside Out album and will be releasing the album digitally.

Reception of the album has been initially, very positive. Music Reviewer Albert Watson, from Metromix music, writes,

What happens when you combine a South African/Dutch singer (now based in L.A.), some aging rockers and a televised singing competition? This album! Sort of. Dilana didn't actually win Rock Star: Supernova, but she did come close. Close enough, in fact, for No Doubt drummer Adrian Young and Mötley Crüe guitarist Mick Mars to help back her on this firecracker of a major-label debut. As one might expect, it's a polished, punchy set of alt-influenced hard rock that does everything it can to showcase Dilana's outsized set of pipes."

=== Other singles ===
Dilana has also released a series of singles, many of which will not be included on her debut album. Dilana has released covers of Johnny Cash's "Ring of Fire" and The Police classic "Roxanne". Dilana was also featured on a re-recording of "Black", a track on Gilby Clarke's best-of album released 30 January. Dilana also released a version of "Killer Queen"; her version was featured on the final episode of the UK edition of When Woman Rule The World and the Women's Tennis Championship on Versus TV Network (formerly OLN) in November 2007. On Tuesday, 9 June 2009, Dilana released an original entitled "Hangover" on the AO Recordings label via iTunes.

=== American Idol connection ===
In 2009, Dilana began to receive some national exposure because of American Idol as two contestants on the show credit her during post-Idol interviews. American Idol Season 8 contestant Adam Lambert sang an arrangement of "Ring of Fire" very similar to the one Dilana performed. In an interview with Michael Slezak of Entertainment Weekly, Adam says he liked Dilana's arrangement a lot and that it was a source of inspiration for his cover of the song. Adam's cover of "Ring of Fire" did not go unnoticed by Dilana nor her record label:

I am stoked that Adam Lambert from American Idol chose to use my version of Ring of fire on last night's episode. It's an honor knowing that my arrangement and "Kashmir" version of the Johnny Cash classic "turned him on" to the point where he wanted to use it on the show.

Allison Iraheta, another American Idol Season 8 contestant, covered Dilana's song "Holiday" on her debut album, Just Like You, slated for a 1 December 2009 release date. In an interview with Lyndsey Parker of Yahoo! Music, who tells Allison that her cover of "Holiday" is the song on Just Like You she's most excited about because it's a cover of a Dilana song, said,

I was a big fan of Dilana's ... I never watched the show, but I checked it out online once and I was like "Homegirl can sang!" ... Kinda crazy, I didn't know she was going to release that in her album ... I mean, I would have never covered it if I knew she was going to release it cause it's all her, but I think it definitely has room for both of us because we each bring something different to the table ... dear God, her voice is ridiculous; I love it ... I wish I could talk to her and be like, "Thanks for making such a dope-ass song! Wow. It's cool."

Later in the same interview, Allison said, "it is a little intimidating (to cover a song by someone you respect) at first cause I was like 'wow, this is so good,' but we're different." Dilana has said that Allison is "the only chic I would ever want to cover my song," calling her "so smart ... so talented" and saying that she had a "beautiful future ahead."

=== The Voice of Holland (2016) ===
Dilana participated in The Voice of Holland, season 7 (2016–2017) passing through the Blind Audition, The Battle rounds, but got sick on the day and left the show after The Knockout performance of "It Must Have Been Love".

== Discography ==
=== Albums ===
Year	Album details	Chart position
Year	Album details	NET
2000	Wonderfool: Released: 5 September 2000; Label: Red Bullet; Format: CD	62
2009	Inside Out: Released: 17 November 2009; Label: Kabunk Records; Format: digital download	
2013	Beautiful Monster: Released: 10 August 2013; Label: Rusty Harp Records; Format: CD: digital download	
2016	Dilana / Angel Camouflaged: Released: February 2016; Label: Rusty Harp Records; Format: CD: digital download	

=== Singles ===
Year	Song	Album	Peak positions		
Year	Song	Album	IS	NET	ZA
1996	"Dancing in the Moonlight"(with Wozani)	Dancing in the Moonlight	–	–	1
2000	"Do You Now"	Wonderfool	–	29	–
2000	"To All Planets"	Wonderfool	–	25	–
2000	"The Great Escape"	Wonderfool	–	82	–
2006	"Roxanne"	Single only	1	–	–
2007	"Killer Queen"	Single only	9	–	–
2007	"Holiday"	Inside Out	–	–	–

=== Other appearances ===
Year	Song	Album
2000	"Do You Now"	Ready To Go 4 – Women of Today
2000	"Do You Now"	Rockzone 2
2000	"To All Planets"	Veronica The Smart One: Top 100 – 2000 Nummer 06
2002	"Do You Now"	Rock From The 90's
2007	"Black"(Gilby Clarke feat. Dilana)	Gilby Clarke

== Songs in other media ==
Year	Title	Type	Song
2000	Lek||Film	"To All Planets"	
2001	Soul Assassin	Film	"Soul Assassin"
2007	Passions	TV series episode: "Episode #1.2039"	"Supersoul"
2007	WTA Tour Championships	TV sports program	"Killer Queen"
2008	When Women Rule the World	TV series episode: "Episode #1.8"	"Killer Queen"
2010	The City	TV series episode: "Lost in Translation"	"World Party"
2011	Angel Camouflaged	Film	"Airplane"
2011	Angel Camouflaged	Film	"Dead Flower"
2011	Angel Camouflaged	Film	"Double Headed Man"
2011	Angel Camouflaged	Film	"Everywhere"
2011	Angel Camouflaged	Film	"Ice"
2011	Angel Camouflaged	Film	"Maybe Just A Little"
2011	Angel Camouflaged	Film	"Slaves"
2011	Angel Camouflaged	Film	"Supersoul"

== Awards and nominations ==
Year	Award	Nominated work	Category	Result
2007	FM 957 People's Choice Award	Rockstar Iceland Concert (with Josh Logan, Magni and Storm Large)	Gig of the Year	Won
2010	Action on Film International Film Festival	Dilana (as Scottie Ballantyne in Angel Camouflaged)	Best Actress	Won
2010	American International Film Festival	Dilana (as Scottie Ballantyne in Angel Camouflaged)	Best Actress	Won
