= It's All Love =

It's All Love may refer to:

- "It's All Love!", a 2009 song by Kumi Koda
- "It's All Love" (Rock Star Supernova song), 2006
- It's All Love, a 1999 album by Myka 9
- "It's All Love", a song by Belly featuring Starrah on Another Day in Paradise (mixtape), 2016
- "It's All Love", a song on the 2020 soundtrack album Trolls World Tour (soundtrack)
- "It's All Love", a 2024 song by Abi Carter
