= Inside Out (Dilana album) =

Studio album by Dilana
- Released: 11 November 2009
- Genre: Rock/Alternative/Pop
- Label: Kabunk Records
- Producer: Dave Bassett

Dilana chronology
Wonderfool (2000)	Inside Out (2009)

Singles from Inside Out
- 1. "Holiday" Released: February 20, 2007

Inside Out is the second studio album by Rock Star: Supernova runner-up Dilana. It was released via digital distribution on November 17, 2009.

== Development ==
"Inside Out," originally entitled "Darklight," was recorded in Los Angeles and features No Doubt drummer Adrian Young, Mötley Crüe guitarist Mick Mars and producer Dave Bassett. Although Dilana signed a contract with London-based Hurricane Records (Hurricane Music Group Ltd) in early 2008 and was finished with recording her new album already in mid-2008, it was not released by said record company. In a later update from Dilana on hardrockhideout.com she announced that not only did she get released from her contract with HMG due to the label's shutdown but also that the master recordings did not belong to her. Dilana then went into negotiations with Kabunk Records, LLC. Although Dilana was unable to sign a deal with Kabunk, the label did purchase the rights to the Inside Out album and will be releasing the album digitally.

== Critical reception ==
Professional ratings
Review scores
Source	Rating
Hard Rock Hideout	7/10 stars
Metromix	(Positive)
Pop Matters	7/10 stars
Sputnik Music	4/5 stars

Reception of the album has been, initially, very positive. Albert Watson, from Metromix music, writes,

What happens when you combine a South African/Dutch singer (now based in L.A.), some aging rockers and a televised singing competition? This album! Sort of. Dilana didn’t actually win “Rock Star: Supernova,” but she did come close. Close enough, in fact, for No Doubt drummer Adrian Young and Mötley Crüe guitarist Mick Mars to help back her on this firecracker of a major-label debut. As one might expect, it’s a polished, punchy set of alt-influenced hard rock that does everything it can to showcase Dilana’s outsized set of pipes."

== Singles ==
Year	Title	Length	Album	Format	Notes
2007	"Holiday"	3:43	Inside Out	Digital Download	Covered by Allison Iraheta on Just Like You

== Track listing ==
1. Holiday - 3:43
2. My Drug - 2:55
3. Hate U - 3:59
4. Loud Silence - 3:44
5. Somebody Else - 4:16
6. Ice - 4:26
7. Solid Gold - 4:09
8. Dirty Little Secret - 3:44
9. World Party (Free Love) - 3:29
10. Falling Apart - 4:02
11. Still Wanting - 3:48
12. The Question - 7:35
