= Holiday (Dilana song) =

Single by Dilana

from the album Inside Out
- Released: 2007, 2009
- Recorded: 2007
- Genre: Glam rock
- Length: 3:46
- Label: Rusty Harp
- Songwriter(s): Dave Bassett, Dilana
- Producer(s): Dave Bassett

Dilana singles chronology
"Supersoul" (2006)	"Holiday" (2007)

"Holiday" is an original song written by Dilana, about how her life has changed after appearing on Rock Star: Supernova. On February 20, it was released with "Ring of Fire" as a B-side track, exclusively on digital download websites such as iTunes and MySpace (through Snocap), where fans can also listen to the full version for free. It is the first single from her U.S. debut album, Inside Out, which was released on November 17, 2009.

== Recording information ==
Co-writing/ Vocals - Dilana

Co-Writing/Producing/Multiple Instruments - Dave Bassett

Mastering - Brian Gardner

Drums - Adrian Young (No Doubt)

Drum Tracks - Andrew Alekel (Grandmaster Recorders)

== Track listing ==
Year	Title	Album	Format	Notes
2007	"Holiday"	Inside Out	Digital Download	Covered by Allison Iraheta on Just Like You
2007	"Ring of Fire"	Single Only	Digital Download	Cover of Johnny Cash song

== Music videos ==
Dilana released a home-made music video for "Holiday" on YouTube on March 6, 2007. She used footage from her first six months after her rise to fame on Rock Star: Supernova, covering everything from her trips to Iceland to her first independent tour in the United States. Fans can watch the video by clicking on the following link: Holiday unofficial music video

In November 2009, the official music video premiered on Entertainment Weekly. The music video made its official television debut on LCN's The Vault on November 20, 2009, at 8:30 pm.

== Allison Iraheta version ==
American Idol Season 8 contestant Allison Iraheta covered "Holiday" on her debut album, Just Like You.

In an interview with Lyndsey Parker of Yahoo! Music, who tells Iraheta that her cover of "Holiday" is the song on Just Like You she's most excited about, Iraheta said,

I was a big fan of Dilana's ... I never watched the show, but I checked it out online once and I was like "Homegirl can sang!" ... Kinda crazy, I didn't know she was going to release that in her album ... I mean, I would have never covered it if I knew she as going to release it cause it's all her, but I think it definitely has room for both of us because we each bring something different to the table ... dear God, her voice is ridiculous; I love it ... I wish I could talk to her and be like, "Thanks for making such a dope-ass song! Wow. It's cool."

Later in the same interview, Allison said, "it is a little intimidating (to cover a song by someone you respect) at first cause I was like 'wow, this is so good,' but we're different." Rock Star: Supernova runner-up Dilana has also praised Iraheta, saying that she is "the only chic I would ever want to cover my song," calling her "so smart ... so talented" and saying that she had a "beautiful future ahead."

=== Reception ===
Iraheta's cover of the song has been received positively. Jim Cantiello, from MTV writes "Iraheta's rock and roll swagger is in full swing on this rock and roll shuffle, co-written by fellow reality star Dilana," adding that 'Holiday' should be released as a single." Lyndsey Parker, from Yahoo! music called it a "glam-rock stomper." Michael Slezak, of Entertainment Weekly, writes, "The second I heard 'Holiday,' I thought to myself: 'This ditty should go directly to The Rocker (referring to Iraheta) — without passing go, and without collecting $200.'"
