= Sex Tips from Rock Stars =

2010 book by Paul Miles

Sex Tips from Rock Stars: In Their Own Words
- Author: Paul Miles
- Language: English
- Subject: Rock and pop music, self help, sex instruction
- Genre: Biography, Health, Family & Lifestyle, Sex & Sexuality
- Publisher: Omnibus Press
- Publication date: July 5, 2010 (first edition)
- Publication place: United Kingdom
- Media type: print (paperback)
- Pages: 272
- ISBN: 978-1-84938-404-9
- OCLC: 50170658
- Followed by: Before I Hit the Stage (2015)

Sex Tips from Rock Stars: In Their Own Words is a book by Paul Miles that quotes answers from 23 rock stars to many questions on a broad range of sexual topics. The editors claim that the book is the world's first confessional by rock stars on their sexual adventures.

As the rock stars share their sexual instincts, urges and experiences, it produces a book that is part self-help sex manual, part rock music biography, part humour, and part erotica.

- Acey Slade – Murderdolls, Dope
- Adde – Hardcore Superstar
- Allison Robertson – The Donnas
- Andrew W.K.
- Blasko – Ozzy Osbourne, Rob Zombie
- Brent Muscat – Faster Pussycat
- Bruce Kulick – Kiss
- Chip Z'Nuff – Enuff Z'Nuff
- Courtney Taylor-Taylor – The Dandy Warhols
- Danko Jones
- Doug Robb – Hoobastank
- Evan Seinfeld – Biohazard
- Ginger – The Wildhearts
- Handsome Dick Manitoba – The Dictators, MC5
- James Kottak – Scorpions, Kingdom Come
- Jesse Hughes – Eagles of Death Metal
- Jimmy Ashhurst – Buckcherry
- Joel O'Keeffe – Airbourne
- Lemmy – Motörhead
- Nicke Borg – Backyard Babies
- Rob Patterson – Korn, Otep
- Toby Rand – Juke Kartel
- Vazquez – Damone

The sexual topics covered in the book comprise the following chapters:

- Beauty & attraction
- Clothing & lingerie
- Copulation
- Daring locations
- Dating & courtship
- Divorce
- Drugs & alcohol (& impotence)
- Enlargements & extensions
- Fetishes & fantasies
- Foreplay & arousal
- Groupies
- Hygiene & grooming
- Kissing & caressing
- Knitting & crocheting
- Marriage
- Masturbation (autoeroticism)
- Money for sex
- One night stands
- Oral sex
- Romancing & winning hearts
- Safe sex (contraceptives & STDs)
- Sexual preference (hetero & homo)
- Technique improvements
- Toys & tools
- Virginity

After contributing to the best-selling rock autobiography The Dirt, Paul Miles authored a range of paperback music books on the rock band: Mötley Crüe. Sex Tips from Rock Stars is his first book with other musicians.

The book was released worldwide by Omnibus Press, in July 2010 in Europe, and October 2010 in North America and Australia.
