= Be Yourself and 5 Other Cliches =

"Be Yourself (And 5 Other Cliches)"

Single by Rock Star Supernova

from the album Rock Star Supernova
- Released: November 21, 2006
- Recorded: 2006
- Genre: Hard rock
- Length: 3:10
- Label: Burnett/Epic Records
- Songwriter(s): Gilby Clarke and Butch Walker
- Producer(s): Butch Walker

Rock Star Supernova singles chronology
"It's All Love" (2006)	"Be Yourself (And 5 Other Cliches)" (2006)	"Headspin" (2007)

"Be Yourself and 5 Other Cliches" is the second single from hard rock supergroup Rock Star Supernova and was released on the band's self-titled debut album.

== Rock Star: Supernova ==
The song is only one of four tracks from the album that were performed on the reality show, Rock Star: Supernova. On the show, the song was first performed by Toby Rand.

== Jimmy Kimmel Live! ==
The band performed the song on the late-night American television talk show, Jimmy Kimmel Live!.
