= Levolution =

Levolution may refer to:

- Levolution, a feature of Frostbite (game engine)
- Levolution (album)
