= Wonderfool =

Studio album by Dilana
- Released: 5 September 2000
- Genre: Pop/Rock/Alternative rock
- Label: Red Bullet

Dilana chronology
| Wonderfool (2000) | Inside Out (2009) |

Singles from Wonderfool
- 1. "Do You Now" Released: February 19, 2000; 2. "To All Planets" Released: April 29, 2000; 3. "The Great Escape" Released: December 2, 2000

Wonderfool is an album by Rock Star: Supernova runner-up Dilana released in 2000 under the alias Dilana Smith. It was relatively successful; three of the five released singles successfully charted in The Netherlands. With the exception of the track Wonderfool, the album's sound is lighter than what Dilana showcased on Rock Star: Supernova and her more recent work. The album was re-released in 2006, following Dilana's appearance on Rock Star: Supernova. Dilana has stated that she does not make any financial benefit from sales from this album. Because it did not sell enough when originally released, all the proceeds go to Red Bullet.

== Singles ==
| Year | Title | Length | Album | Format | Chart (NET) |
|---|---|---|---|---|---|
| 2000 | "Do You Now" | 4:04 | Wonderfool | CD, Digital Download | 29 |
| 2000 | "To All Planets" | 4:27 | Wonderfool | CD, Digital Download | 25 |
| 2000 | "The Great Escape" | 5:08 | Wonderfool | CD, Digital Download | 82 |

== Track listing ==
1. "Kissed a Butterfly"
2. "Do You Now"
3. "To All Planets"
4. "Elvis Motor Inn"
5. "Breakfast in Central Park"
6. "When You're Around"
7. "Solo"
8. "PMS (Pack My Suitcase)"
9. "Secret of My Soul"
10. "Livin' by the Day"
11. "Wonderfool"
12. "The Great Escape"
13. "I Wish You Luck"
