= Juke Kartel =

Australian rock band

- Origin: Melbourne, Victoria, Australia
- Genres: Alternative rock
- Years active: 2003–2013
- Members: Toby Rand; Tommy Kende; Jason Pinfold; Dale Winters; AJ Oliveira
- Past members: Todd Burman; Eddie Murphy; Adam Wickel; Ted Window
- Website: facebook.com/JukeKartel open.spotify.com/artist/4ipjaPXLoG6Tpct3hEsqrK

Juke Kartel is an Australian rock band from Melbourne. The band formed in Melbourne in the early 2000s. They found success with the most consistent line up being Toby Rand, Dale Winters and Tommy Kende. Juke Kartel occasionally performs in Melbourne and Sydney when the members come home from all parts of the world.

== History ==
Lead vocalist Toby Rand, brought fame to the band after competing in American singing competition Rockstar: Supernova, a T.V show broadcast worldwide on CBS television - he finished third. In the early Fall of 2010, Juke Kartel released their latest album Levolution on Carved Records.

=== Before Rock Star Supernova ===
Before Toby appeared on Rock Star: Supernova, Juke Kartel were just beginning to make a serious impression in their home town of Melbourne. They were originally famous in Melbourne's underground music scene. Most notably Juke Kartel opened for Nickelback in April 2006 and performed at such shows as the Taste of Chaos Tour in October 2005.

=== Post-Supernova ===
Following lead vocalist Toby Rand finishing third in the Rock Star Supernova series in September 2006, Juke Kartel signed to major international management company Sanctuary, who were negotiating with several record companies to finalize Juke Kartel's first label deal. In the meantime, they played some well-received shows at LA's famed Viper Room as showcase gigs.

The band was home in Australia for a short break in the later stages of October through until early November in 2006, before returning to the US to tour. In early 2007 they were invited to join the Rock Star Supernova US tour in North America. In January 2007 they joined the huge Tour of the US and Canada, supporting Epic recording artists Rockstar Supernova. Juke Kartel performed alongside former Mötley Crüe drummer/vocalist, Tommy Lee, and fellow Rockstar Supernova band member Lukas Rossi, who beat Rand to claim the vocalist role in Supernova. In March 2007 they featured as the tour's special guests for shows in Australia and New Zealand. Frontman Toby Rand said in an interview that many pranks were played throughout the tour, including Tommy Lee and co. taking the drums from Juke Kartel mid-solo one-by-one, leaving the drummer with only a snare and a hi-hat. He says they got Tommy back by covering his skins with talcum powder, leaving him in a white mist.

Juke Kartel's return to Australia heeded two landmark performances for the band, at both the 2007 Astra Awards and the Australian 2007 MTV Video Awards. Their energetic live rendition of "Throw it Away" at the Australian 2007 MTV Video Awards received a positive reaction from pop star, Fergie.

On 30 November 2007, the band announced that their 2004 song, "Save Me", would feature on the series The Biggest Loser 5 in the US.

In late 2007, Juke Kartel did a number of gigs in their home town of Melbourne, including an unplugged performance on 23 November 2007, to open a show at the Palais Theatre in Melbourne, for Australian Idol season one runner up Shannon Noll. Also a performance at the Ferntree Gully Hotel in Melbourne's eastern suburbs alongside Australian band, Noiseworks, was declared a "sellout" by the band's website.

=== Signed ===
Juke Kartel released their debut album Nowhere Left to Hide on 3 April 2009. The album was produced by Rick Parashar who has worked with acts such as Nickelback, Pearl Jam, 3 Doors Down and Bon Jovi. The first single from their debut album, "Save Me", was released on 4 October 2008, with a music video shot in New York City. The video received airplay from Rage and Video Hits. After the success of "Save Me", Juke Kartel released two more singles, "December" was the second and it received quite a bit of airplay, the third single, "If Only" was released and has received some airplay, including a live performance of it on the WB Kids show on Channel 9.

Juke Kartel have toured the album successfully all over Australia, from Melbourne, to Sydney, to Brisbane and the Gold Coast and even Perth. They played a huge fire benefit concert in Traralgon that also featured Lee Kernaghen, Bodyjar, Adam Brand and Evermore. Juke Kartel have announced via a Myspace blog that after the "Nowhere Left To Hide Tour" that they are permanently moving to California, USA to further their career.

In May 2010, it was announced by Carved Records that they would be picking up Juke Kartel as the newest artist on their label. They are set to release their Carved Records debut, Levolution, in early Fall of 2010. They have since relocated to Los Angeles, CA and are preparing for a tour of Australia with Slash in August 2010.

== Television appearances ==
On return to Australia from touring, in early 2007, Juke Kartel's newfound fame led them to performing on two Australian morning television shows. 9am with David and Kim on Network 10 and The Today Show on the Nine Network. Toby also made a cameo appearance on Channel 9's show, 20 to 1.

On 2 November 2007, Rand appeared as a co-host on Channel V program, whatUwant.

On 24 March 2009, Juke Kartel appeared on Canadian TV - The Electric Playground.

On 10 May 2009, Juke Kartel appeared on the Warner Brothers kids show, performing their single "If Only".

In late 2009, Juke Kartel appeared on Season 3 of BETA Records TV and did an acoustic version of "My Baby".

On 20 January 2010, Tommy Kende made an appearance on the Spike series, 1000 Ways to Die.

In 2011, Juke Kartel appeared as the stars in an episode of The Antonio Project on HGTV

== Musical influences ==
Juke Kartel's influences came from many Australian bands such as INXS, AC/DC, and Midnight Oil, as well as other bands including Led Zeppelin, Guns N' Roses and U2. When asked in an interview, Toby Rand said that if the band could play with any other band, past or present, they would love to play with AC/DC, Pink Floyd, Incubus, INXS and Guns 'N' Roses. Juke Kartel will open for Slash (ex-Guns N'Roses) on 22 November 2009 in Los Angeles.

== Band members ==
- Toby Rand - Vocals
- Tommy Kende - Bass/Backing Vocals
- Dale Winters - Guitar/Backing Vocals
- AJ Oliveira - Guitar/Keyboard/Backing Vocals
- Jason Pinfold - Drums

=== Drummer replacement ===
Juke Kartel announced on 11 October 2007 on their website that Eddie Murphy "is no longer playing drums in jk (Juke Kartel)". Subsequently, Murphy was replaced by South African born Jason Pinfold. Pinfold also spent time in New Zealand prior to "landing in Oz" and eventually take the role as drummer for Juke Kartel.

== Discography ==
=== Albums ===
List of albums, with selected details and chart positions
Title	Details	Peak chart positions
Title	Details	AUS
Nowhere Left to Hide	Released: 2009; Label: Emporium Music	76
Acoustic Sessions	Released: 2010; Label: Juke Kartel Records	—
Levolution	Released: 2010; Label: Carved	—

=== EPs ===
List of EPs, with selected details
Title	Details
Tarko EP	Released: 2003; Label: Self-released
Juke Kartel EP	Released: 2006; Label: Self-released

=== Singles ===
List of singles, with selected chart positions
Title	Year	Peak chart positions	Album
Title	Year	AUS	Album
"Throw It Away"	2007	—	Nowhere Left to Hide
"Save Me"	2008	— (Note: "Save Me" did not enter the ARIA Singles Chart, but peaked at number 38 on the ARIA Physical Singles Chart.)	Nowhere Left to Hide
"December"	2008	74	Nowhere Left to Hide
