= Costa Mesa Hates Me =

Single by Supernova
- Released: 1994
- Recorded: 1994
- Genre: Pop punk
- Label: Tres Hombres Musica
- Songwriter(s): Dave Collins, Art Mitchell, Hayden Thais

"Costa Mesa Hates Me" is a song by Supernova, released as their fourth single on 7" by Tres Hombres Musica in 1994.

Tracks one and three were included on the 2001 compilation CD Pop as a Weapon.

The song was covered by The Vandals in 1996 on the Assorted Jellybeans/Vandals 7" split.

== Track listing ==
All lyrics written by Supernova.

Side A:

- Costa Mesa Hates Me

Side B:

- Cool Job
- Costa Mesa Hates Me Pt. 2

== Personnel ==
- Art Mitchell - Vocals, bass guitar
- Hayden 'Hank' Thais - Guitar, vocals
- Dave Collins - Drums, vocals
