= Before I Hit the Stage =

Before I Hit the Stage: Backstage Rock ‘n’ Roll Moments in New York City
- Author: Paul Miles and Jason Obrotka
- Language: English
- Subject: Rock and pop music, art, photography
- Genre: Rock 'n' roll, photo essay
- Publisher: Outskirts Press
- Publication date: March 17, 2015
- Publication place: United States
- Media type: print (hardback) and ebook
- Pages: 222
- ISBN: 978-1478739739
- Preceded by: Sex Tips from Rock Stars (2010)

Before I Hit the Stage: Backstage Rock 'n' Roll Moments in New York City (ISBN 978-1478739739) is a rock music photography book of images taken in concert dressing rooms and backstage hallways that capture artists in the moments before their performances. The authors claim that the book is the world's first photo-essay book of rock stars on tour in one city during one year.

The photographs show pre-show rituals and backstage antics of the artists, including getting into their stage clothes, putting on makeup, and warming up their fingers and vocal cords before performing in New York City during 2013.

It chronologically presents hundreds of images of 60 rock bands and solo artists, plus VIP guests Alice Cooper and Debbie Harry (Blondie). Orianthi is on the cover of the book.

After contributing to the best-selling rock autobiography The Dirt, Paul Miles authored a range of paperback music books on the rock band Mötley Crüe. His previous book Sex Tips from Rock Stars was released worldwide in 2010.

Before I Hit the Stage was released worldwide in hardcover format by Outskirts Press in March 2015.
