= Rock Star Supernova (album) =

Studio album by Rock Star Supernova
- Released: November 21, 2006
- Recorded: May 17 & June 11, 2006 at Pulse Recording California by Karl Egsieker
- Genre: Hard rock, heavy metal
- Length: 41:02
- Label: Burnett/Epic
- Producer: Butch Walker

Singles from Rock Star Supernova
- 1. "It's All Love"; 2. "Be Yourself (and 5 Other Cliches)"; 3. "Headspin"; 4. "Can't Bring Myself to Light This Fuse"

Professional ratings
Review scores
Source	Rating
Allmusic	2/5 stars
Rolling Stone	2.5/5 stars

Rock Star Supernova is the only studio album by American hard rock supergroup Rock Star Supernova, released on November 21, 2006, through Mark Burnett Productions and Epic Records. The band was formed during the second season of the Rock Star TV series, which was called Rock Star: Supernova. The album received mainly negative reviews and only charted at number 101 on the Billboard 200. However the album charted at #4 on the Canadian Albums Chart and was certified Gold (over 50,000 units sold).

== Background ==
Rock Star Supernova band members: Tommy Lee (Mötley Crüe), Jason Newsted (Voivod and ex-Metallica) and Gilby Clarke (ex-Guns N' Roses) formed the basis of the second season of the Rock Star television program on CBS in the quest to find a lead singer. The show began online on the Rock Star web site on MSN on Monday, July 3 with an Internet exclusive weekly episode and premiered on CBS on July 5, 2006. Votes were cast via the Rock Star website. On September 13, 2006, Lukas Rossi was crowned the winner.

== Release and reception ==
Upon release, Rock Star Supernova entered the Billboard 200 charts at number 101 selling 17,000 copies in the first week. The album also debuted at number 87 in Australia and number 4 in Canada.

Professional music critics mostly offered negative reviews of the album. Stephen Thomas Erlewine, senior critic of AllMusic, wrote, "At no point does this band make sense ... it's gloriously bad, the kind of music that can only result when three talented musicians are contractually obligated to work with a wannabe singer who would be a laughing stock on a local level." Christian Hoard of Rolling Stone thought the album had a few bright spots, "but most of the tunes feel tired, if not retrograde: Opener 'It's On' could have come from Collective Soul, the ballads suck, and there are some dark, sub-Alice in Chains bangers."

== Track listing ==
No.	Title	Writer(s)	Length
1.	"It's On"	Tommy Lee, Butch Walker, Scott Humphrey	4:05
2.	"Leave the Lights On"	Lee, Walker, Humphrey	2:43
3.	"Be Yourself (and 5 Other Cliches)"	Gilby Clarke, Walker	3:10
4.	"It's All Love"	Lee, Walker, Humphrey	3:15
5.	"Can't Bring Myself to Light This Fuse"	Lee, Walker, Humphrey	3:51
6.	"Underdog"	Clarke, Walker, Lukas Rossi	3:37
7.	"Make No Mistake... This Is the Take"	Lee, Walker, Humphrey	3:18
8.	"Headspin"	Rossi, Dominic Cifarelli	4:04
9.	"Valentine"	Clarke, Walker, Rossi	4:27
10.	"Social Disgrace"	Lee, Walker, Humphrey, Rossi	3:04
11.	"The Dead Parade"	Clarke, Walker, Rossi	5:28

== Personnel ==
Rock Star Supernova

- Lukas Rossi – lead vocals, rhythm guitar
- Gilby Clarke – lead guitar
- Jason Newsted – bass
- Tommy Lee – drums

Additional musicians

- Butch Walker
- Scott Humphrey
- Chad Stewart
- Josh Freese
- Jason Freese
- Nate Morton
- Rafael Moreira
- Sofi Toufa

Production personnel

- Butch Walker – production
- Mike Shipley – mixing
- Brian Wohlgemuth – mixing assistance
- Ted Jensen – mastering

== Charts ==
Chart performance for Rock Star Supernova
Chart (2006)	Peak position
Australian Albums (ARIA)	87
Canadian Albums Chart	4
New Zealand Albums (RMNZ)	6
US Billboard 200	101

== Certifications ==
Country	Certification	Sales/shipments
Canada	Platinum	100,000
