= Levolution (album) =

Studio album by Juke Kartel
- Released: Australia: 20 August 2010; USA: 28 September 2010
- Recorded: 2010
- Genre: Alternative rock
- Length: 48:28
- Label: Carved Records
- Producer: Rick Parashar/Brian Virtue

Juke Kartel chronology
Nowhere Left to Hide (2009)	Levolution (2010)

Singles from Levolution
- 1. "The Sign" Released: 20 August 2010; 2. "If Only" Released: 28 September 2009

Professional ratings
Review scores
Source	Rating
TheyWillRockYou.Com	4/5 stars

Levolution is the second studio album by Australian rock band Juke Kartel, and the first American released album. Levolution was released to the Australian public through Carved Records on 20 August 2010, and later released to the United States on 28 September 2010. Produced by Brian Virtue (Jane's Addiction, Velvet Revolver, Thirty Seconds to Mars, Chevelle) and Rick Parashar (Pearl Jam, Alice in Chains, 3 Doors Down, Nickelback), the album features a half-dozen freshly penned tracks and six from the band's 2009 Australian CD, Nowhere Left to Hide, remixed by Dan Korneff (My Chemical Romance, Cavo). With its overarching theme of personal growth and "the journey we’re all on", says vocalist/lyricist Toby Rand, Levolution finds musical parity in its strong hooks, multi-textured instrumentals and passionate vocals.

The title of the album comes from a word lead singer Toby Rand created, during an interview with shakefire.com Toby explains; "Levolution' is a word i created. It means 'Understanding the process of life by evolving to new or greater levels'...we have been faced with many goals to rise to and concur and the word Levolution sums up our band life. I am so fuckin proud of 'Levolution'....it is a culmination of our band's journey over the last few years and really tells stories of evolution we have undertaken. It has acoustic driven songs, heavy rock, and melodic sonics. So rewarding to hold the finish product and see everything we've poured into the album."

Levolution has received positive reviews from critics. Juke Kartel have also received high praises from producer Rick Parashar "Juke Kartel is one of the best rock bands to come out in a long time. They definitely are on their way to being a commercial arena rock band, with a '60s, grunge-like quality that gives them an edge."

== Singles ==
The first single released from the album was "The Sign". A music video has been shot but has yet to be released. The second single released was "If Only". The song was released in conjunction with Levolution, to radio and as a digital download in the USA. A music video has also been filmed but is still yet to be released.

== Track listing ==
1. "Anybody Out There" – 4:48
2. "My Baby" – 3:46
3. "Bullet Wearing Trademark Clothes" – 4:27
4. "If Only" – 3:42
5. "The Sign" – 4:20
6. "Save Me" – 3:42
7. "Road of Glass" – 3:28
8. "Soulshaper" – 3:53
9. "December" – 4:16
10. "Throw It Away" – 3:06
11. "On Fire" – 4:11
12. "Findout" – 4:49
