= Rox (album) =

Studio album by Supernova
- Released: February 10, 1998
- Recorded: Fall 1997–January 1998
- Genre: Pop punk
- Length: 40:52
- Label: Amphetamine Reptile
- Producer: Mike McHugh

Supernova chronology
Ages 3 & Up (1995)	Rox (1998)	Pop as a Weapon (2001)

Rox (often mistitled as Supernova, Rocks or Supernova (Rocks)) is the second album by the pop punk band Supernova, released in 1998.

== Critical reception ==
Professional ratings
Review scores
Source	Rating
Los Angeles Times	3/4 stars

The Boston Phoenix contrasted the album with Supernova's debut, writing that it "isn't quite as catchy, veering into somewhat less interesting (and even more tangentially alien) territories like phone sex, uh, barn sex, girls, and revved-up early-'80s hardcore." The Los Angeles Times called the album "frequently delightful," and praised the band's "ability to rock out with catchy, crunchy, crisply executed bubble-gum punk."

== Track listing ==
All lyrics written by Supernova.

1. "Purple Pony" - 2:17
2. "Back in the Saddle" - 3:11
3. "Swat the Fly" - 2:36
4. "Telephone" - 4:04
5. "Cynot Girl" - 2:44
6. "Roll in the Hay" - 2:46
7. "Dancin' Skool" - 3:03
8. "King Ding Dong" - :11
9. "3,2,1 Go!" - 2:12
10. "Mommy" - 3:25
11. "Flagpole" - 2:16
12. "Books" - 2:57
13. "Monsta" - 1:39
14. "Cowboy" - 2:46
15. "Rock 'n' Roll" - 4:38

== Personnel ==
- Art Mitchell – Vocals, bass guitar
- Jodey Lawrence – Guitar, vocals
- Dave Collins – Drums, vocals
