= Angel Camouflaged =

2010 film

Angel. Camouflaged
- Directed by: R. Michael Givens
- Written by: R. Michael Givens
- Starring: James Brolin; Dilana; Warrick Grier
- Cinematography: R. Michael Givens
- Release date: July 28, 2010 (AOF Fest)
- Country: United States
- Language: English

Angel Camouflaged is a 2010 drama film directed by R. Michael Givens. It stars James Brolin, Dilana, Warrick Grier, Carlos Bernard and Patty Smyth.

== Cast ==
- James Brolin as Salt
- Dilana as Scottie Ballantyne
- Warrick Grier as Morgan
- Carlos Bernard as Jude Stevens
- Terry Serpico as Mr. Belial
- Patty Smyth as Aunt Marie
- Jordan Woods-Robinson as Kip
- Marshall Tucker Band as Mustard A. Jones Band
- Tessie Santiago as Desdemona
- Cal Johnson as Balaclava Man
- Violeta Leskyte Cucchiara as Valya

== Awards and nominations ==
Year	Award	Nominated work	Category	Result
2010	Action On Film International Film Festival	R. Michael Givens	Best Cinematography	Won
2010	Action On Film International Film Festival	Dilana	Best Actress	Won
2010	Action On Film International Film Festival	James Brolin	Best Supporting Actor	Won
2010	Action On Film International Film Festival	R. Michael Givens	Best Artwork and Poster	Won
2010	American International Film Festival	Dilana	Best Actress	Won
2010	American International Film Festival	Dilana	Best Use of Music	Won
