= Lis Lewis =

American voice teacher

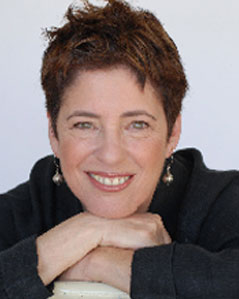
- Lis Lewis

Background information
- Origin: New York City, United States
- Occupations: Voice Teacher and Performance Coach, Author
- Instruments: Voice, Piano, Guitar
- Website: http://www.thesingersworkshop.com

Lis Lewis is an American voice teacher, author and performance coach. Lewis's clients include Miguel, Gwen Stefani, Rihanna, Courtney Love, Britney Spears, Colbie Caillat, Linkin Park, Demi Lovato, Tyson Ritter of The All-American Rejects, The Pussycat Dolls, Bryson Tiller, Iggy Azalea, and Jack Black.

== Musical background ==
Lewis grew up in New York City and began training as a child at the Dalcroze School of Music as well as with private music teachers. She attended both the University of Wisconsin-Madison and the University of Nebraska–Lincoln and has a master's degree in Theater and Music. Lewis has taught voice classes and lectured at the Liverpool Institute for Performing Arts, University of California, Berkeley, Musicians Institute in Hollywood, Blue Bear School of Music, Santa Monica College, National Academy of Songwriters, and UCLA.

== Career ==
=== The Singer's Workshop ===
Lewis founded a series of workshops, classes as well as private voice lessons called The Singer's Workshop in Los Angeles. She has been training recording artists since 1983. In 2012 Lewis worked with Grammy winning singer, Miguel. Lewis appeared as vocal coach on CBS's Rockstar: Supernova and MTV's Rock The Cradle. She has also appeared as a commentator on TV Guide Network’s Idol Chat, VH1's Dice: Undisputed, and Miss America: Reality Check.

Client List

- Miguel
- Rihanna
- Britney Spears
- Bryson Tiller,
- Iggy Azalea
- Courtney Love
- Gwen Stefani
- The All-American Rejects
- Demi Lovato
- Jack Black
- Meaghan Martin
- Kate Voegele
- Motion City Soundtrack
- The Bravery
- The Pussycat Dolls
- Colbie Caillat
- Jimmy Eat World
- Metro Station
- Priyanka Chopra
- Carolina Liar
- Boys Like Girls

=== Author ===
Lewis is the author of The Singer’s First Aid Kit and The Pop Singer’s Warm-Up. Both books not only focus on exercises and information to train his/her voice, but expand upon the challenges that professional singers face.
