= Pop as a Weapon =

Studio album by Supernova
- Released: January 23, 2001
- Recorded: 1992–1994
- Genre: Pop punk
- Length: 30:59
- Label: Sympathy for the Record Industry
- Producers: Supernova; Virgile Gentile; Geoff Harrington

Supernova chronology
Rox (1998)	Pop as a Weapon (2001)

Professional ratings
Review scores
Source	Rating
Allmusic	4/5 stars

Pop as a Weapon (often mis-credited as "More Songs About Hair") is a compilation album from Orange County pop punk band Supernova, released in 2001 by Sympathy for the Record Industry.

The album contains material recorded between 1992 and 1994 that was only previously available on vinyl.

== Track listing ==
All lyrics written by Supernova.

1. "Intro/Backyard Boat" – 4:28
2. "Calling Hong Kong" – 2:27
3. "Disco Fur" – 2:15
4. "Costa Mesa Hates Me" – 2:39
5. "Chewbacca" – 1:21
6. "Choke the Fuzz" (live) – 2:05
7. "Bad Haircut" – 3:24
8. "Long Hair and Tattoos" – 3:07
9. "Supersong" – 2:52
10. "Our Way or Highway" – 0:59
11. "Drool" – 1:15
12. "Electric Man" – 3:37
13. "Refuse Worker #2" – 1:02
14. "Costa Mesa Hates Me Pt. 2" – 1:28
- Tracks 1–5, 7–11 were recorded at Pyramid Productions by Virgil Gentile, 1992–1994
- Track 6 was recorded live at Our House in Costa Mesa, 1993
- Tracks 12–13 were recorded at Saturation Studios by Geoff Harrington, 1993
- Tracks 8, 10, and 11 were originally on the Long Hair & Tattoos 7".
- Tracks 2 and 5 were originally on the Calling Hong Kong 7".
- Tracks 12, 13, and 6 were originally on the Electric Man 7".
- Tracks 4 and 14 were originally on the Costa Mesa Hates Me 7".

== Personnel ==
- Art Mitchell – Vocals, bass guitar
- Hayden 'Hank' Thais – Guitar, vocals
- Dave Collins – Drums, vocals
