= Nowhere Left to Hide =

Studio album by Juke Kartel
- Released: 3 April 2009
- Recorded: 2008 at London Bridge Studios in Seattle, United States
- Genre: Alternative rock
- Length: 48:10
- Label: Emporium Music
- Producer: Rick Parashar

Juke Kartel chronology
Juke Kartel EP (2006)	Nowhere Left to Hide (2009)	Levolution (2010)

Singles from Nowhere Left to Hide
- 1. "Save Me" Released: October 4, 2008; 2. "December" Released: January 10, 2009; 3. "If Only" Released: April 3, 2009

Professional ratings
Review scores
Source	Rating
TuneLab Music	9/10 stars

Nowhere Left to Hide is the debut studio album by Australian rock band Juke Kartel, released through Emporium Music on 3 April 2009. The title of the album comes from lyrics in the song "Then She Said".

== Live performances ==
On 27 March 2009, Juke Kartel commenced their Nowhere Left to Hide national tour. They were supported by Town Hall Steps and Stone Parade. They also performed at the Gippsland emergency relief concert, to support victims of the February 2009 Victorian bushfires, along with Evermore, Adam Brand and Lee Kernaghan.

== Singles ==
The first single released from the album was "Save Me", on 4 October 2008. A music video was shot in New York City and has been shown on Channel V and Video Hits. The song was featured in an episode of The Biggest Loser 5 in the United States. The second single released was "December" on 10 January 2009. "If Only" was the third single released on 3 April 2009. The song was released in conjunction with Nowhere Left to Hide, to radio and as a digital download. On 27 March, Juke Kartel performed an acoustic version of "If Only" on Channel Ten.

== Track listing ==
1. "Save Me" - 3:44
2. "Throw It Away" - 3:06
3. "December" - 4:21
4. "If Only" - 3:42
5. "Innocence" - 3:51
6. "My Baby" - 3:44
7. "Sleeptalker" - 5:27
8. "The Closer We Get" - 3:39
9. "Scars" - 3:32
10. "Then She Said" - 3:59
11. "On Fire" - 4:17
12. "Firesign" - 4:47

== Charts ==
Chart performance for Nowhere Left to Hide
Chart (2009)	Peak position
Australian Albums (ARIA)	76
Australian Independent Albums (AIR)	4
