= It's All Love (Rock Star Supernova song) =

Single by Rock Star Supernova

from the album Rock Star Supernova
- Released: November 21, 2006
- Recorded: 2006
- Genre: Hard rock
- Length: 3:15
- Label: Burnett/Epic Records
- Songwriters: Tommy Lee; Butch Walker; Scott Humphrey
- Producer: Butch Walker

Rock Star Supernova singles chronology
"It's All Love" (2006)	"Be Yourself and 5 Other Cliches" (2006)

"It's All Love" is the debut single from hard rock supergroup Rock Star Supernova, released on the self-titled debut album.

== Rock Star: Supernova ==
The song was only one of four tracks from the album that were performed on the reality show, Rock Star: Supernova. While on the show, it was performed with Magni Ásgeirsson but on the finale Lukas Rossi sang it with the band after being chosen as the lead singer.

== Gemini Awards ==
Lukas Rossi and Gilby Clarke performed an acoustic version of the song at the Gemini Awards.

== Chart performance ==
Canada BDS
Day	01	02	03	04	05
Position	95	79	60	45	6
