= Supernova (American band) =

American pop punk band

- Origin: Costa Mesa, California, U.S.
- Genres: Punk rock, pop punk
- Years active: 1989–present (on hiatus since 2010)
- Labels: Amphetamine Reptile, Atlantic, Sympathy for the Record Industry
- Members: Art Mitchell; Dave "Nova" Collins; Courtney "Chainsaw" Pollock
- Past members: Hayden "Hank" Thais (1989–1994); Jodey Lawrence (1994–2008)
- Website: Official website

Supernova is an American punk rock band, founded in Costa Mesa, California in 1989. The band has released three full-length albums, numerous singles and EPs and were part of the original 1995 Vans Warped Tour line-up. They are perhaps best known by wider audiences for their song "Chewbacca", which was featured on the soundtrack to Kevin Smith's 1994 independent film Clerks. They are also known for the song "Up & Down", which was performed in 2007 on the Nick Jr. children's show Yo Gabba Gabba!

== Biography ==
=== Early years (1989–1994) ===
The original line-up of Supernova formed in Costa Mesa, California in 1989, consisting of bassist/vocalist Art Mitchell, guitarist/vocalist Hayden Thais and drummer Dave Collins. Noted for their energetic live shows and outlandish science fiction-themed aesthetic in which the members claimed to be aliens from a distant planet. the band quickly became a popular draw within the Orange County punk scene, independently releasing a slew of 7" singles and EPs throughout the early 1990s and receiving regular airplay on local and college radio.

In 1994, Supernova received significant exposure when their song "Chewbacca" - a mostly instrumental piece featuring the band members growling like Wookiees - was featured in the successful independent comedy Clerks and its respective soundtrack. That same year, however, Thais departed from the group's line-up, later joining the popular surf rock outfit Man or Astro-man? and fronting the robot-themed New Wave rock band Servotron.

=== Indie breakthrough (1995–2005) ===
After hiring Jodey Lawrence as their new guitarist, Supernova recorded their debut studio album Ages 3 & Up in 1995 on Amphetamine Reptile Records. The release of the album was followed by extensive touring as the band joined the line-up of the inaugural Vans Warped Tour in 1995, spending the remainder of the decade regularly touring with such notable Orange County bands like The Aquabats and Reel Big Fish, as well as opening for bands including The Buzzcocks, Dick Dale, The Presidents of the United States of America and The Supersuckers. In 1998, Supernova released their second album Rox, accompanied by another appearance on the Warped Tour in 1999. Rox was soon followed by Pop as a Weapon in 2001, a compilation album collecting all of the band's early vinyl releases.

In 2003, OC Weekly ranked Supernova No. 86 in their feature "The 129 Greatest OC Bands Ever". The reviewer described the band as "part of the wave of bands that brought the spotlight to OC for a bit", summarizing them as "one of the first and best of the slew of outer-space-themed rock bands". In an AllMusic review of Pop as a Weapon, reviewer Ned Raggett called Supernova "one of the most underrated acts of the '90s", calling their songs "[q]uick, brisk, to-the-point, and hilarious as all hell" and writing "Quite why they never connected with more folks like the equally wonderful Man or Astro-man?...will have to remain one of the many cosmic mysteries of music".

=== Resurgence (2006–2009) ===
In the mid-2000s, after several years of relative inactivity, Supernova experienced a resurgence of popularity after embarking on several tours with The Aquabats, following their own commercial resurgence with the 2005 album Charge!!. In 2007, Supernova appeared on two episodes of Yo Gabba Gabba!, a popular children's television series developed by Aquabats singer Christian Jacobs, where they performed their song "Up & Down" and featured Lawrence in a segment playing electric guitar with Aquabats guitarist Eagle "Bones" Falconhawk. Following the release of the live 7" ¡Diga Queso!, the band's first recorded material in six years, Supernova played a number of high-profile festivals, including the 2006 and 2008 Bamboozle fests and the 2007 Warped Tour.

In August 2008, Jodey Lawrence left Supernova; in a MySpace blog announcing his departure, the band facetiously explained that Lawrence had decided to become a "full-time Earthling". Former Aquabats guitarist and longtime Supernova fan Corey Pollock was recruited as a temporary replacement, though immediately following his first show with the band, it was announced that Pollock would become a permanent member, retaining his Aquabats stage name of "Chainsaw".

=== Current era (2010–present) ===
Since 2007, Supernova had announced plans to record a new studio album, with at least two new songs, "Poodle" and "Whiffle Bat", having been written and performed at live shows. Following Lawrence's departure, however, the band mentioned wanting to re-write the material with Pollock, though plans for the album were dropped as the band quickly slipped into an unexplained hiatus, performing their last show as "Supernova" on January 29, 2010.

On June 16, 2012, Mitchell, Collins and guitarist "Ben Nova" performed an all-Supernova set at the Tiki Bar in Costa Mesa under the name "Gum Fighters". There was no further information on Supernova's status until October 28, 2014, when the band released an EP entitled No Data on Amazon.com, featuring demos and various recordings from the cancelled studio album.

On April 26, 2015, Supernova - with Lawrence back on guitar - performed as part of a benefit show at The Boathouse in Costa Mesa.

On July 2, 2016, Supernova - Art, Dave, Jo - will perform at SATURDAY IN THE PARK festival in Sioux City, IA, as well as a club show at Marty's Tap in Sioux City on July 1, 2016.

2024 will see BeiHei Park Records release the band's second full length on vinyl for the first time ever.

== Band mythology and live shows ==
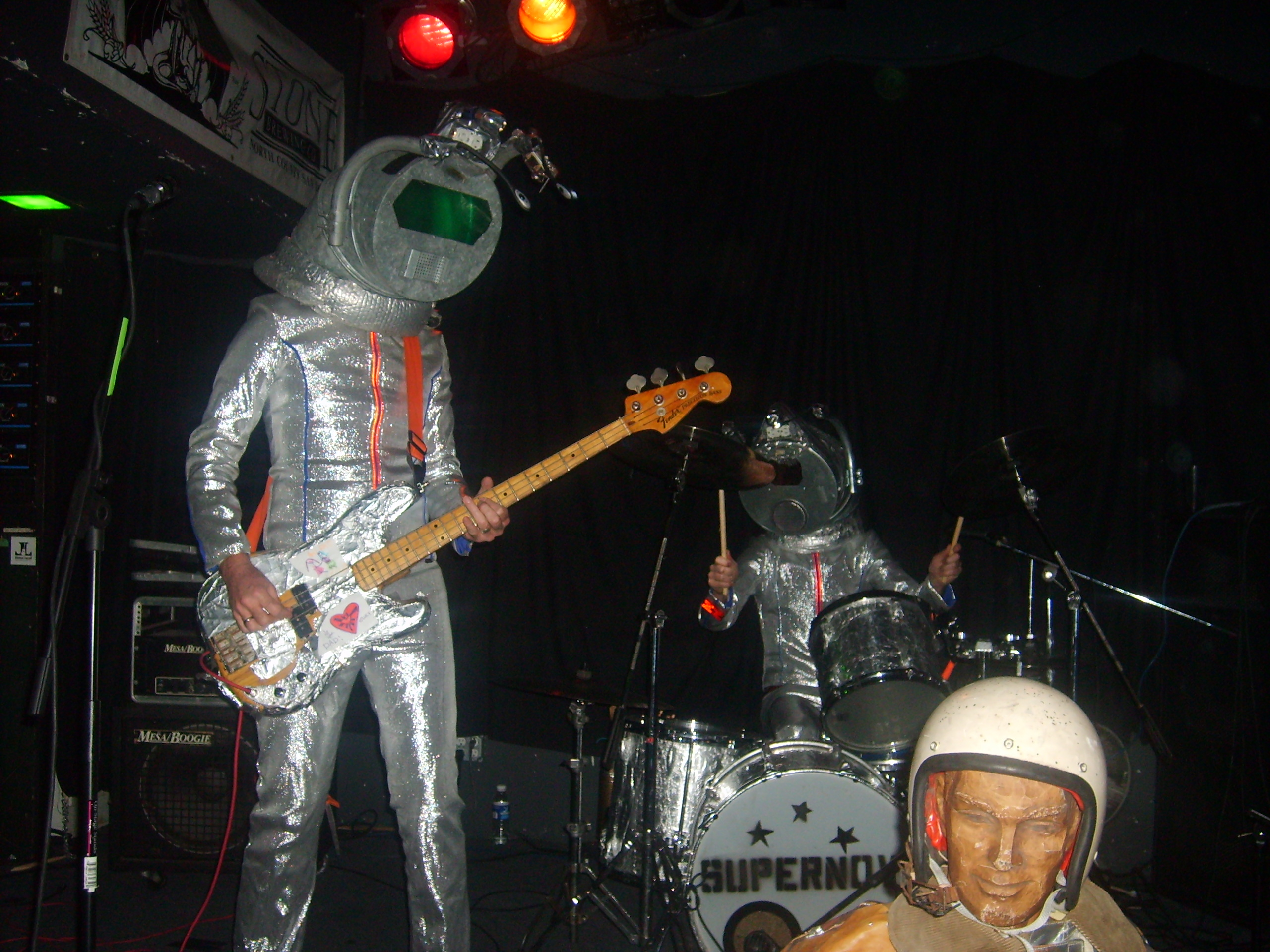
Supernova in spaceman regalia.

Similar to such bands as The Aquabats, The Phenomenauts or Servotron, one defining aspect of Supernova is the fictional mythology which accompanies the band's outer space theme.

According to the band's biography and press kits, the origins of Supernova begin on the distant planet of Cynot 3, a world inhabited by kind aliens who spend their days relaxing and searching for valuable tin foil. One day in 1989, their sun exploded in a supernova and the Cynotions were forced to flee the planet. Three native Cynotians - Art, Hank and Dave (later retconned to include Jo in hybernation phase) - escape just in time with their rock n' roll-powered tour bus spaceship and crash land in Costa Mesa, where they decide to start their very own rock band and use their popularity to convince Earth kids to bring them precious tin foil.

In 1995, Supernova produced a 25-minute television pilot starring themselves based on the band's mythology. Entitled Last In Space: A Show for Kids?, the pilot was an adult-oriented children's show chronicling the trio's adventures within their space van, complete with musical numbers. The pilot ultimately failed to generate network interest, but copies of the pilot were regularly sold on VHS at the band's shows up until their hiatus.

=== Live performances ===
While not as elaborately staged as other theatrical bands like The Aquabats, Supernova's live shows were characterized by a heavy science fiction-themed visual aesthetic. The band members most often entered the stage wearing shiny silver jumpsuits and custom-made space helmets, removing the latter to frequently reveal bizarre hairstyles or facial hair. Tin foil was a crucial element of the band's style: both Collins' drum kit and Mitchell's bass guitar were covered in foil, and the band would hand out sheets to audience members so they could create their own accessories. Fans were encouraged to wear tin foil to Supernova shows - with most venues offering ticket discounts for those who did - and, at the insistence of the band, attempt to pelt the members in the face with foil balls during the show. Mitchell often incited mass foil attacks by frequently making the often-disputed claim that he had never been successfully hit in the face.

== Rock Star dispute ==
From 1999 to 2003, a Chilean girl group named Supernova had to be billed as "Supernova Chile" in the United States.

In 2006, CBS premiered the second season of their reality television series Rock Star, in which contestants compete to become the lead singer of a new band featuring established musicians. The band which was created for the season, including musicians Tommy Lee, Jason Newsted and Gilby Clark, was to be named "Supernova".

On 27 June 2006, the members of the Orange County Supernova filed a lawsuit against CBS, Mark Burnett and Rockstar Entertainment, seeking compensatory and punitive damages, as well as trademark protection of the "Supernova" name and the destruction of all Rock Star materials bearing the name "Supernova". One of the primary pieces of evidence was a MySpace message from Rock Star producer Butch Walker in which he notes that the defendants had been informed of the existence of a prior Supernova, but decided to proceed anyway.

The defendants did not believe that the plaintiffs had exclusive and enforceable trademark rights to the band name "Supernova" for a number of reasons, including that the Orange County Supernova band had not performed for years, that they were not the only band who used the name "Supernova", and that their trademark rights had never been very strong.

On 12 September 2006, the judge ruled in favor of the original Supernova, granting their request for a preliminary injunction. The injunction kept the producers and musicians of Rock Star from performing, recording, or selling merchandise under the name "Supernova" pending the outcome of the lawsuit. As a result, the CBS band was simply renamed "Rock Star Supernova" and the lawsuit was settled soon thereafter (Rock Star Supernova disbanded in 2008).

== Members ==
=== Current lineup ===
- Art Nova (Art Mitchell) (born March 25, 1965) - bass, lead and backing vocals (1989–present)
- Dave Nova (Dave Collins) - drums, backing vocals (1989–present)
- Jo Nova (Jodey Lawrence) (born April 28, 1968) - guitar, lead and backing vocals (1994-2008, 2010–present)

=== Former members ===
- Chainsaw (Corey Pollock) - guitar, backing vocals (2008-2010)
- Hank (Hayden Thais) (born April 5, 1969) - guitar, lead and backing vocals (1989-1994)

== Discography ==
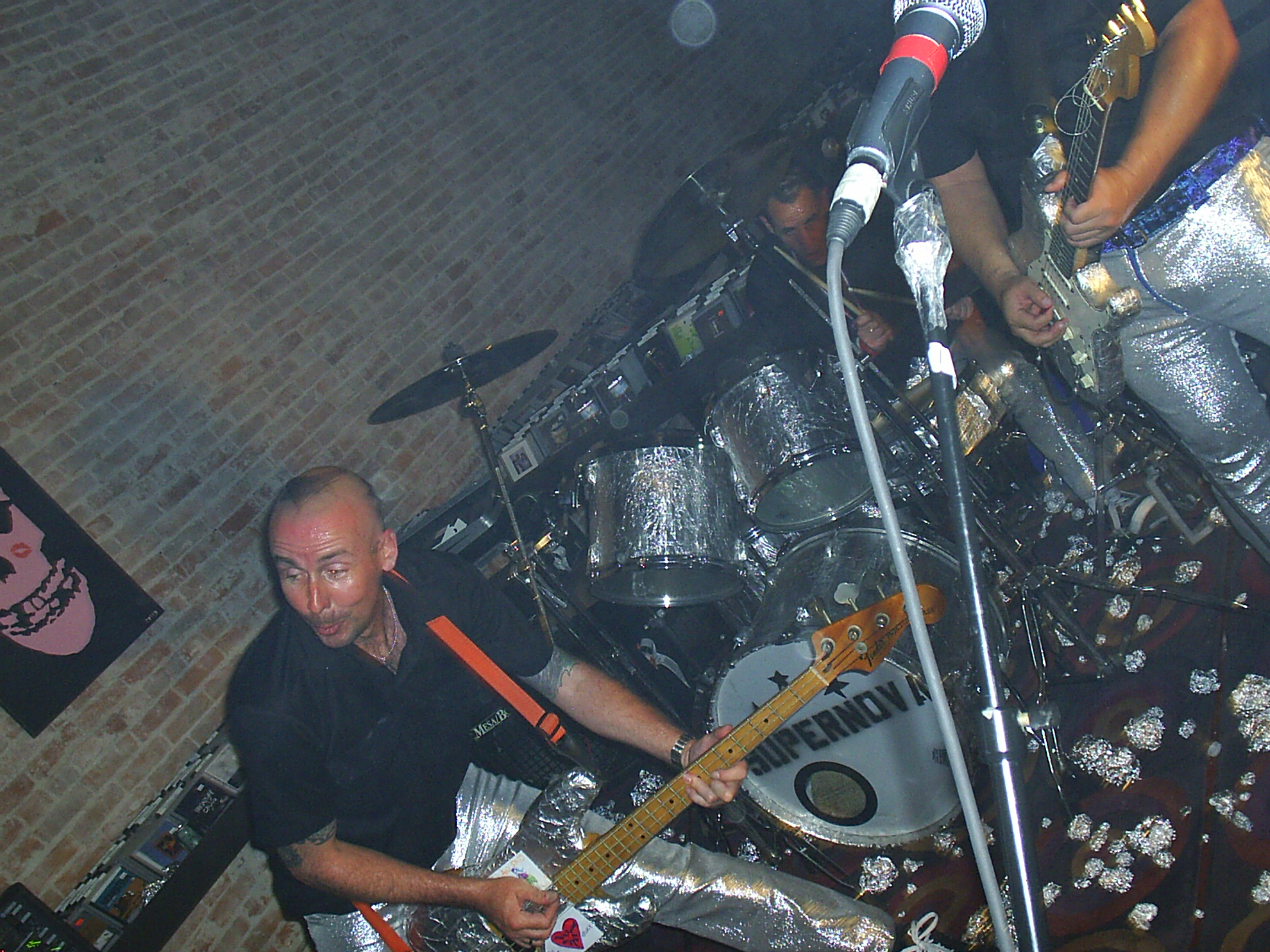
Supernova performing live at The Glass House Record Store in Pomona, California.

=== Studio albums ===
- Ages 3 & Up (1995, Amphetamine Reptile Records)
- Rox (1998, Amphetamine Reptile Records)

=== Compilations ===
- Pop as a Weapon (2001, Sympathy for the Record Industry)

=== EPs ===
- More Songs About Hair (1993, Odyssey Records)
- Live at the Lava Room (1997, What Else Records)
- No Data (2014, Religious Grandma Records)

=== Singles ===
- "Long Hair & Tattoos" (1992, Odyssey Records)
- "Calling Hong Kong" (1993, Goldenrod Records)
- "Electric Man" (1993, Sympathy for the Record Industry)
- "Costa Mesa Hates Me" (1994, Tres Hombres Musica)
- "Monsta!!" (1995, Sympathy for the Record Industry)
- "How Much More" (1996, Sympathy for the Record Industry)
- "¡Diga Queso!" (2007, Rococo Records)

=== Non-album tracks and compilation appearances ===
- "Chewbacca", Clerks: Music from the Motion Picture (1994, Sony Records)
- "Math", AmRep Motors 1995 Models (1995, Amphetamine Reptile Records)
- "Math", Tromeo and Juliet (Soundtrack) (1996, Oglio Records)
- "Vitamins", Dr Marten's Capitol Records Music Sampler (1996, Capitol Records)
- "Calling Hong Kong" Super Mixer: A Goldenrod Compilation (1996, Goldenrod Records)
- "Gates of Steel", We Are Not Devo (1997, Glue Factory Records)
- "Vitamins", AmRep Equipped (1997, Amphetamine Reptile Records)
- "Sugar Coated Stucco", Dope-Guns-'N-Fucking in the Streets (1997, Amphetamine Reptile Records)
- "The Trooper," Iron Maiden cover, I Love Metal (1999, Triple Crown Records)
