= Dana Andrews (musician) =

American singer and musician

Dana Andrews is a singer/musician from Augusta, Georgia. She was a top 15 finalist on the TV show Rock Star: Supernova.

== Biography ==
=== Early life ===
Born and raised in Augusta, Georgia, Dana found the stage early. She sought out any avenue to showcase her talent from elementary to high school and beyond. Whether it was school plays, karaoke contests or community theater, Dana has always found the spotlight. At thirteen, she began creating her own original material and devised a mission to find the musicians to complete her sound.

=== Career ===
Dana joined The Tony Howard Show & Band (a top-40 cover band) singing backup and lead at nineteen to hone her vocal skills. Shortly thereafter she cut her first demo. She traveled to several syndicated radio stations in the Southeast to promote her own music, and eventually was contacted by Everything After, an established original band based in Columbia, SC. Shortly after officially joining the band in early 2006, Dana auditioned for CBS's Rock Star: Supernova, hosted by Dave Navarro and Brooke Burke. Out of over 25,000 artists from nine countries auditioning, she made the final 16 and traveled to Hollywood to be on the show. She lasted 6 weeks on the show. The band Supernova consisted of Gilby Clarke, Jason Newsted, and Tommy Lee.

After being released from the competition, Dana returned home, where Augusta mayor Deke Copenhaver personally awarded her with a plaque declaring August 12, 2006, to be Dana Andrews Day. Soon, she reunited with her band, Everything After, in South Carolina. Within one month, the group had recorded and publicized two songs that were played on radio stations such as WARQ, WXRY and WCHZ. They performed with acts like 7 Mary 3, Decyfer Down, Black Stone Cherry, Drivin N Cryin, Hanson, Crossfade, and Buckcherry and developed a steady following. In 2009, she relocated to Los Angeles, recording with several different projects of various genres. She was a member of the blues-infused rock band Uniform Standard, where she played top venues in Los Angeles and San Francisco, had a show at SXSW Austin and played in NYC at The Bitter End.

She has now started a solo music career where she blends Southern rock with faith-based lyrics. She is based in Los Angeles.
