= Rock Star (TV series) =

American competition television series

- Genre: Reality competition
- Created by: Mark Burnett
- Presented by: Brooke Burke; Dave Navarro
- Country of origin: United States
- Original language: English
- No. of seasons: 2
- No. of episodes: 54

Production
- Executive producer: Mark Burnett
- Producers: Al Berman; David Geffen; Lisa Hennessy
- Camera setup: Multi-camera setup

Original release
- Network: CBS
- Release: July 11, 2005 – September 13, 2006

Rock Star is a television series produced by Mark Burnett, David Geffen, Lisa Hennessy, and Al Berman in which aspiring singers from around the world competed to become the lead singer of a featured group. It debuted on CBS on July 11, 2005, to mediocre ratings.

The show was hosted by television personality and commercial spokeswoman Brooke Burke and Jane's Addiction lead guitarist Dave Navarro. In season one Australian rock band INXS chose J.D. Fortune as their new lead singer. For season two, the newly formed supergroup hard rock band, Rock Star Supernova chose Lukas Rossi as the lead singer.

== Show information ==
Alice in Chains was approached by the producers of Rock Star for the show's second season, but the band turned the offer down.

In the final episode of season two, auditions were announced for a third season. However, CBS announced in May 2007 the series would not be renewed for a third season due to the premiere of another Burnett series, Pirate Master. Burnett has made a statement that he would like to bring Rock Star back for a third season. Velvet Revolver was a potential candidate; however, the band declined.

The show is notable for having future season 5 American Idol contestant Chris Daughtry audition for its first season. Daughtry did not make the cut for Rock Star: INXS.

Rock Star aired on CBS in the United States, Sky One in the UK, FOX8 in Australia, TV3 in New Zealand, Skjár einn in Iceland and Global in Canada.

Currently Supernova are no longer active, their last appearance together was in 2008. First season winner J.D. Fortune had been the lead singer of INXS for about six years from 2005 to 2011. The band decided not to renew the expiring contract for him after the Original Sin tour ended in August 2011. INXS themselves later disbanded in 2012.

== Seasons ==
Season	Subtitle	About	Season premiere	Season finale	Contestants	Winner
1	INXS	Finding a lead singer for INXS to replace deceased lead singer Michael Hutchence	July 11, 2005	September 20, 2005	15	J.D. Fortune
2	Supernova	Finding a lead singer for supergroup Rock Star Supernova, featuring Mötley Crüe drummer Tommy Lee, former Metallica and then-current Voivod bassist Jason Newsted and former Guns N' Roses guitarist Gilby Clarke	July 5, 2006	September 13, 2006	15	Lukas Rossi

== Albums ==
INXS released the album Switch following the first series with J.D. Fortune on lead vocals and went on tour. Switch was released on 29 November 2005. and peaked at number 17 on the Billboard 200, and appeared on the Canadian Hot 100 and Top Internet Albums charts at numbers two and 56, respectively. The album has sold 391,000 copies in the U.S. since release. The single "Pretty Vegas" received gold certification from the Recording Industry Association of America (RIAA) on 26 January 2006. In Canada, both the album and the single, "Pretty Vegas", went platinum and reached number one on the charts. The album received platinum certification in December 2005 by the Canadian Recording Industry Association (CRIA), and Canadian sales of the album have exceeded 170,000 units. The album went platinum and peaked at number 18 on the ARIA Charts.

Rock Star Supernova released their debut self-titled album following the second series and also went on tour. The album was released on November 21, 2006, and charted at #101 on the Billboard 200 and #4 on the Canadian Albums Chart. and was certified Platinum (over 100,000 units sold).

== House band ==
Contestants performed with a house band known as simply The House Band. The members of the House Band were Paul Mirkovich, Jim McGorman, Rafael Moreira, Nate Morton, and Sasha Krivtsov.

The House Band toured throughout 2006 with lead singer and guitarist of Kiss, Paul Stanley.
