= Lukas Rossi =

Canadian singer (born 1976)

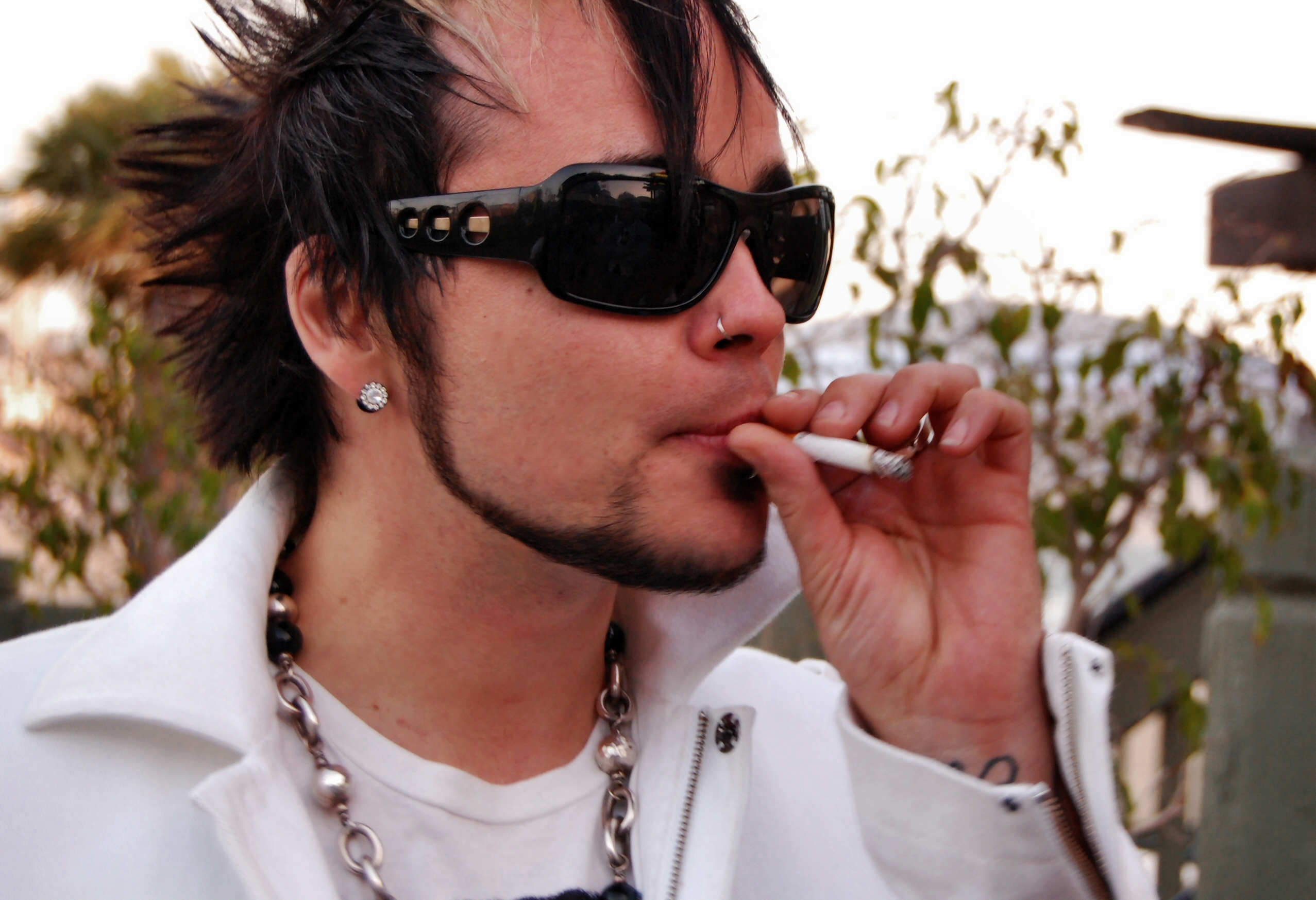
- Rossi in 2009

Background information
- Born: December 21, 1976 (age 49)
- Origin: Toronto, Ontario, Canada
- Genres: Rock; pop rock; hard rock
- Occupations: Singer; songwriter; musician
- Instruments: Vocals; guitar
- Website: lukasrossionline.com

Lukas Rossi (born December 21, 1976) is a Canadian rock singer, songwriter, musician, and producer. He was the winner of the CBS Television reality series Rock Star: Supernova – a televised audition contest to become lead singer of the hard rock supergroup Rock Star Supernova.

== Biography ==
Rossi was raised in Toronto, Ontario, Canada. He formed and fronted two bands; the first was Cleavage (1995–2005) with brothers Jon and Bill Jameson and Guitarist Jeff Smith. The Toronto-based band won the "Best Canadian Unsigned Band" award at the 2000 NXNE Music Festival in Toronto.

In 2004, Rossi entered into a publishing deal with EMI Music Canada. After acquiring this deal, Rossi worked with producer Dave Tyson in Los Angeles and later recorded demos with producer Gavin Brown.

In 2005, Rossi partnered with guitarist Dominic Cifarelli and drummer Maxx Zinno along with his longtime friend, Jay Cianfrini, to form a band in Montreal called Rise Electric.

Rossi and two of his colleagues, Mike Fox and Gavin Brown, were winners in the 2006 People's Voice International Songwriting Competition for their song, "Drive". It gained third place honors in the Top 40/Pop category and landed seventh place in the overall competition.

In the years following Rock Star: Supernova, Rossi has continued to work as a solo artist, songwriter, musician, and producer. He released a new album "Autonomic" in December 2021 and a new single "Alien Is Me" February 2024.

== Career ==
As of 2025, Rossi has released 21 solo albums and 33 singles spanning his career. Rossi is set to release a triple album in 2025.

=== Cleavage ===
Lukas formed and fronted Cleavage (1995–2005) with brothers Jon and Bill Jameson, as well as Grant Grebe during the band's first years. The Toronto-based band won the "Best Canadian Unsigned Band" award at the 2000 NXNE Music Festival in Toronto.

=== Rock Star: Supernova ===
While Rise Electric was on hiatus in the spring of 2006, Rossi competed in Los Angeles, California, on the television show Rock Star: Supernova, as an audition for a new band composed of Tommy Lee (Mötley Crüe), Jason Newsted (Metallica), and Gilby Clarke (Guns N' Roses). His selection as lead singer of Rock Star Supernova earned Rossi a tour of the U.S., Canada, Australia, and New Zealand in early 2007. One of his songs, "Headspin", was included on the band's album which earned platinum status in Canada.

=== After Rock Star Supernova ===
Rossi returned to Los Angeles to begin work on his own solo acoustic act. The Love and Lust EP was released in June 2007. He toured across the U.S. and Canada during the summer, accompanied by keyboard player, Lou Dawson (Men Without Hats).

=== Stars Down ===
In 2008, Rossi debuted his next project Stars Down. The band consisted of Rossi (vocals, guitar), German Briseño of Vim Furor (bass, vocals), with occasional appearances by Lou Dawson (keyboards), and guitars and drums with various musicians. The album was originally scheduled to be released in 2009 but Rossi has stated it may never see the light of day due to his own dissatisfaction with its quality. However, in 2011 Lukas released a flash drive that contained his back catalog, including the previously unreleased album "Mood Swings".

=== Switchblade Glory ===
On April 15, 2011, a debut album was released which features Rossi as lead vocals under the band named Switchblade Glory. The album was engineered and co-produced by Andy Johns. Producers are Gary Hoey and Steve Polin. Lyrics and melodies by Rossi. The band features Kenny Aronoff on drums, Steve Polin on guitar, and Josh Esther on bass. On February 26, 2021, Switchblade Glory released a new album titled "Human Toys".

=== The Halo Method ===
In 2012, Rossi teamed up with Evanescence co-founder/lead guitarist Ben Moody to form a new project called The Halo Method. In September 2012, the band released an introductory track, "Beauty is the Beast", for an online interview with Revolver Magazine and performed their debut show aboard the rock and roll cruise, Shiprocked, in November. In 2013, the band released a lyric video of "Toxic" and "Reset", an EP that features four songs: "Toxic", "Beauty Is The Beast", "Porcelain" and "Crutch". The EP was available as a free download at The Halo Method SoundCloud. Later in the year, the band appeared at Rock The River, a benefit festival for Angel on My Shoulder. Following their second appearance on Shiprocked (SR14) in late January 2014, The Examiner described the sound of the band: "The Halo Method rounded out the night on the main deck stage with their hard synth-fused rock show at top notch. The Halo Method features former members of Evanescence, and other well known projects, so these are not novice performers to the live stage. They produce hard rock energy with full emotion in one 'rocking fell swoop'. This band combines it all into one hell of a sound and show: elements of hard rock, goth, alternative metal, industrial, and pop with a great presence from a great band and the voice of Lukas Rossi." The band released a video for "The Last Astronaut" as performed aboard the ship.

=== Rock cover of "Hello" by Adele ===
In November 2015, Rossi released a rock cover of "Hello" by Adele which quickly amassed more than 1 million views upon its debut, and was extremely well received by critics, bloggers, radio, press and fans alike.

=== King City ===
In 2016, Lukas Rossi joined forces with Neil Sanderson of Three Days Grace to form the duo known as King City. Their first single, Neurotic, was released on August 25, 2016.

=== Stereo Satellite ===
Stereo Satellite was formed as a modern rock band with elements of many genres thrown in the mix as a result in each member's diverse musical influences. The band debuted on the 2018 Shiprocked Cruise and shortly after opened for Bon Jovi to a sold-out crowd.

=== Summertime solo album & ANDRO by Tommy Lee ===
In July 2020, Rossi released a music video for Summertime that features a litany of cameos as well as his family and friends showing how they are spending their summer.

In October 2020, Rossi was featured on two songs on the album Andro by Tommy Lee, "You Dancy" and a cover of "When You Were Mine" by Prince. Lee also makes an appearance in Rossi's music video for Summertime.

=== Autonomic solo album ===
Rossi released the album Autonomic on December 21, 2021.

=== Singles ===
On February 17, 2022, Three Days Grace released a promotional single, titled "Neurotic", featuring Lukas Rossi. It has amassed more than 25 million views since its debut.

In 2024, Rossi released music videos for the singles "Alien Is Me", "Civil", "Slow Burn", "Sorry Not Sorry", "Lovesick Drivebye", "Mr. Sad", "I Ain't A Monster", and "DOA", as well as a rock cover of "Comeback King" by Corey Feldman.

== Discography ==
=== Cleavage ===
- Cleavage (May 29, 2001)

=== Rock Star Supernova ===
- Rock Star Supernova (November 21, 2006 Burnett Records/Epic Records)

=== Solo ===
- Love and Lust EP (2007)
- So This is Christmas EP (2008)
- The Unreleased Demos (2009)
- The Hope Recordings Live (2009)
- Dark and a Gun EP (2010)
- Hollywood (2010)
- Hollywood Stripped (2010)
- Seed EP (2010)
- The Christmas Collection (2010)
- Story Teller (2011)
- Super Sex Magic (2011)
- Prophecy (2011)
- 8 Days (2012)
- Circus Freak Sideshow (2016)
- Naked (2017)
- Summertime (2020)
- Autonomic (2021)
- Prophecy: The Second Coming (2024)

=== Stars Down ===
- Stars Down Exclusive EP (2008)
- Mood Swings Sampler EP (2008)
- Mood Swings (2008)

=== Switchblade Glory ===
- Switchblade Glory (2011)
- Human Toys (2021)

=== The Halo Method ===
- Reset EP (2013)
- The Halo Method (2025)

== Singles ==
- Happy Xmas (War Is Over) (2008)
- Tattoo (2009)
- Empty Cities (2009)
- Last One Standing (2009)
- "Hello" (Adele Cover) (2015)
- Neurotic (2016)
- "Crawling" (Linkin Park Cover) (2020)
- "I'm Just Human" (2020)
- "Mary, Did You Know?" (Cover) (2020)
- This War (2021)
- "Rebel Yell" (Cover, with Jonathan Young) (2021)
- Headspin (2021)
- Into The Unknown (2022)
- Perfect World (2022)
- Alien Is Me (2024)
- Civil (2024)
- Slow Burn (2024)
- Sorry Not Sorry (2024)
- Lovesick Drivebye (2024)
- Mr. Sad (2024)
- Comeback King (Corey Feldman Cover) (2024)
- I Ain't A Monster (2024)
- DOA (2024)

=== Cleavage ===
- "Riddled" – Cleavage (2001)

=== Rock Star Supernova ===
- "It's All Love" (2006)
- "Be Yourself and 5 Other Cliches" (2006)
- "Headspin" (2007)
- "Can't Bring Myself To Light This Fuse" (2007)

== Features ==
=== Beyblade ===
- Let's Beyblade (2000)

=== Peter Jackson: Fresh Start ===
- "18 To Life" (Skid Row Cover) (2012)

=== Red Orbit ===
- "Connection Failed" (2014)

=== Tommy Lee: ANDRO ===
- "You Dancy" (2020)
- "When You Were Mine" (Prince Cover) (2020)

=== Micah ===
- "Upside Down" (2020)

=== Three Days Grace ===
- "Neurotic" (2022)

=== Defaze ===
- "Headstrong" (2024)
- "Dynamite" (2024)

== Soundtracks ==
=== Beyblade V-Force: Let It Rip ===
- "Lets Beyblade (Opening Theme)" – Beyblade V-Force: Let It Rip (2004)

== Composer ==
- "Cold" Single for Geoff Tate/Queensrÿche
- "Euphoria" Single for Judge & Jury Records and Trevor McNevan/Thousand Foot Krutch

== Media ==
Lukas performed live at the 2006 Gemini awards, appeared on and won the CBS television series Rock Star: Supernova, as well as appearing on The Ellen DeGeneres Show, Live with Regis and Kelly, Jimmy Kimmel Live!, Entertainment Tonight, The Howard Stern Show, and ET Canada. In 2010, Lukas began providing fashion commentary for In Touch weekly entertainment magazine.

== Personal life ==
Rossi and Kendra Jade Rossi, were married in May 2007. In 2021 Lukas and Kendra Jade Rossi divorced.

In a 2015 interview with ET Canada, Rossi announced that he and Kendra had adopted a boy named Bryden.

Lukas Rossi and Ronni Rossi were married in March 2024.
