= Toby Rand =

Australian singer (born 1977)

- Also known as: Rand
- Born: Toby William Lloyd Rand; 21 December 1977 (age 48)
- Origin: Melbourne, Australia
- Genres: Rock, alternative rock
- Occupations: Singer-songwriter, musician
- Instrument: Vocals guitar
- Years active: Early 2000s–present
- Label: The Rejected Group
- Website: TobyRand.com www.facebook.com/tobyrandmusic www.rocktopia.com

Toby Rand is a current Member of THE FELL, with bassist Billy Sheehan, Guitarist Mike Krompass, And Drummer Nick Chiarore. The band has been putting new music out regularly since 2017. In 2025 they released the "Killswitch" EP of 5 Songs.

In 2026 they will release, "The Way I Love You" Oct 14th. They will follow that up with a UK tour in Late November to Mid December,

Toby William Lloyd Rand (born 21 December 1977) is an Australian singer best known for being lead singer of rock band RAND, previous band Juke Kartel, and his appearance on Rock Star: Supernova. Currently, he fronts solo project Toby Rand & The FutureKind, and a lead role in the theater production ROCKTOPIA.

== Early life and family ==
Rand was born in Melbourne. His mother is from north Wales and is fluent in the Welsh language; his father is from England. Toby has two brothers, Simon and Tim. Both were a driving inspiration for him to become a singer/musician. Toby grew up in Bayside Melbourne, Australia. Toby also has a daughter named London Ava Rand who was born in 2009.

== Singing career ==
Juke Kartel

See

Toby Rand & The FutureKind debuted their first release in mid-2019. Working with major producer Alex Geringas, the record pushed the boundaries of the electronic / rock culture. Rand's previous band ‘Juke Kartel’ toured the United States as a support act for Slash, Ozzy Osbourne, Fuel, Rock Star: Supernova and opened for Nickelback and Seether during their Australia tours. Tours have also included Scandinavia, Canada and Australasia. Juke Kartel have also performed at several music festivals in Australia and many music award shows, including winning 2 awards at the MusicOz awards. Juke Kartel released Levolution in 2010/11.

Toby Rand was also a finalist in Cleo's Australian Bachelor of the Year 2008. He is one of the characters in the book Sex Tips from Rock Stars by Paul Miles, published by Omnibus Press in July 2010.0

Ashen Moon

Line-up

- Garry Beers – bass (INXS)
- Toby Rand – lead vocals (Rock Star: INXS)
- Yohai Portal – guitar
- Jackie Barnes – drums

Rand is currently signed to The Rejected Group production team. He released new music with INXS bassist Garry Beers in 2019.
