= Rock Star: Supernova =

Television series

- Hosted by: Brooke Burke; Dave Navarro
- Judges: Tommy Lee; Jason Newsted; Gilby Clarke
- No. of contestants: 15
- Winner: Lukas Rossi
- Runner-up: Dilana
- No. of episodes: 22

Release
- Original network: CBS
- Original release: July 5 – September 13, 2006

Season chronology
- ← Previous; INXS

Rock Star: Supernova is the second season of the reality television show Rock Star. The show, hosted by Dave Navarro and Brooke Burke, featured 15 contestants competing to become the lead vocalist for a newly formed supergroup featuring Mötley Crüe drummer Tommy Lee, former Metallica bassist Jason Newsted, and former Guns N' Roses guitarist Gilby Clarke.

On September 13, 2006, Lukas Rossi was crowned the winner and became the frontman of the band Rock Star Supernova.

== Controversy ==
As the show's name implies, the new group was to be called Supernova; however, another band named Supernova was granted an injunction against the television supergroup stating that they cannot use the name "Supernova" for any promotion or perform under that name. With this judicial ruling, the band announced their official name would be "Rock Star Supernova".

== Background ==
The show began online on the Rock Star web site on MSN on Monday, July 3 with an Internet exclusive weekly episode and premiered on 5 July 2006 on CBS in the United States and Global in Canada. Votes could be cast on the Rock Star website or by text message on Verizon Wireless. it was one of two prominent programs in the "Rock Reality Show" mini movement of the summer of 2006, the other being VH1's Supergroup.

Unlike in the first season, the behind-the-scenes episodes were not televised in the U.S.; instead, they were available online at the official MSN sponsored website, to subscribers of Verizon, and through the Rock Star tab on Windows Live Messenger. However, these "In the Mansion" reality episodes did air on television in Canada on Global, in Australia on Foxtel channel FOX8, and in Asia on STAR World.

== Top 15 Finalists ==
The following is a list of songs performed by each finalist during the competition. They are listed in order of elimination, so the first one mentioned was in first place in the competition and the number represents the week in which the song was performed. Each week one finalist is asked to perform an encore performance of the song they performed the night before which is noted below as an "Encore" performance. The three finalists who have the lowest total votes for the week are also asked to perform another song of their choice, and this song is noted as a "Bottom Three" performance. Additionally, beginning in Week Seven, one finalist is chosen to debut a new Supernova song with the members of Supernova. This is noted below as a "Special" performance.

Lukas Rossi's victory makes him the second Canadian to win the Rock Star competition.

Contestant	Performances	
Lukas Rossi (from Toronto, Ontario); WINNER	1. "Rebel Yell" (Billy Idol); 2. "Don't Panic" (Coldplay); 3. "Let's Spend the Night Together" (The Rolling Stones); 4. "Bitter Sweet Symphony" (The Verve); [Contestant played guitar]: 5. "Celebrity Skin" (Hole); 6. "Creep" (Radiohead); Encore Performance: 7. "Hero" (Chad Kroeger & Josey Scott); [Contestant played guitar]: 8. "All These Things That I've Done" (The Killers)	9. "Lithium" (Nirvana); Special Performance of a Supernova song: "It's On": 10. "Livin' on a Prayer" (Bon Jovi) [Contestant played guitar]; "Headspin" (Lukas Rossi) [Contestant played original song] Bottom Three Performance: "Headspin" (Lukas Rossi) [Contestant played original song]: 11. "Fix You" (Coldplay); "Headspin" (Lukas Rossi) [Contestant played acoustic version of original song] Final Three Performance: "Bitter Sweet Symphony" (The Verve) Won the competition on 09/13/06 Winner's Encore Performance with Supernova: "Be Yourself (And Five Other Clichés)" and "It's All Love"
Dilana (from Johannesburg, South Africa); Runner-up	1. "Lithium" (Nirvana) Encore Performance; 2. "Ring of Fire" (Johnny Cash); 3. "Zombie" (The Cranberries); 4. "Time After Time" (Cyndi Lauper); 5. "Can't Get Enough" (Bad Company); 6. "Won't Get Fooled Again" (The Who) (accompanied by Gilby Clarke on guitar); 7. "Cat's in the Cradle" (Harry Chapin); Special Performance of a Supernova song: "Leave the Lights On"	8. "Every Breath You Take" (The Police); 9. "Mother Mother" (Tracy Bonham) [Contestant played guitar]; Bottom Three Performance: "Psycho Killer" (Talking Heads): 10. "Behind Blue Eyes" (The Who); "Supersoul" (Dilana Robichaux) [Contestant played original song] Bottom Three Performance: "I Want You to Want Me" (Cheap Trick): 11. "Roxanne" (The Police); "Supersoul" (Dilana Robichaux) [Contestant played original song] Final Three Performance: "Zombie" (The Cranberries) Named runner-up on 09/13/06
Toby Rand (from Melbourne, Australia); 3rd Place	1. "Knockin' on Heaven's Door" (Bob Dylan); 2. "Somebody Told Me" (The Killers) Encore Performance; 3. "Runaway Train" (Soul Asylum); 4. "White Wedding" (Billy Idol); 5. "Pennyroyal Tea" (Nirvana); 6. "Burning Down the House" (Talking Heads); 7. "Solsbury Hill" (Peter Gabriel) [Contestant played percussion; accompanied by Gilby Clarke on guitar]	8. "Layla" (Derek and the Dominos); Special Performance of a Supernova song: "Be Yourself (and Five Other Clichés)" Bottom Three Performance: "Plush" (Stone Temple Pilots): 9. "Rebel Yell" (Billy Idol) Encore Performance [also provided backing vocals for Storm's "Bring Me to Life"]; 10. "Mr. Brightside" (The Killers); "Throw It Away" (Toby Rand) [Contestant played original song] Encore Performance (dedicated to fellow Australian Steve Irwin): 11. "Karma Police" (Radiohead); "Throw It Away" (Toby Rand) [Contestant played original song; accompanied by Magni on guitar] Bottom Two Performance: "White Wedding" (Billy Idol) Final Three Performance: "Somebody Told Me" (The Killers) Placed third on 09/13/06
Magni Ásgeirsson (from Borgarfjörður eystri, Iceland)	1. "(I Can't Get No) Satisfaction" (The Rolling Stones); 2. "My Generation" (The Who); 3. "Plush" (Stone Temple Pilots) Encore Performance; 4. "Heroes" (David Bowie) [Contestant played guitar]; 5. "Clocks" (Coldplay); 6. "The Dolphin's Cry" (Live) Encore Performance [Contestant performed solo, playing guitar]; (also played guitar on Zayra's "All the Young Dudes"): 7. "Starman" (David Bowie); Bottom Three Performance: "Creep" (Radiohead)	8. "Smells Like Teen Spirit" (Nirvana); Bottom Three Performance: "Fire" (The Jimi Hendrix Experience): 9. "I Alone" (Live); 10. "Back in the U.S.S.R." (The Beatles); "When the Time Comes" (Magni Ásgeirsson) [Contestant played original song] Special Performance of a Supernova song: "It's All Love": 11. "Hush" (Deep Purple) [Contestant played guitar]; "When The Time Comes" (Magni Asgeirsson) [Contestant played original song] (also played guitar on Toby's "Throw It Away") Bottom Two Performance: "Fire" (The Jimi Hendrix Experience) Eliminated 09/13/2006 (also played guitar on Supernova's song)
Storm Large (from Portland, Oregon)	1. "Pinball Wizard" (The Who); 2. "Surrender" (Cheap Trick); 3. "Just What I Needed" (The Cars); 4. "Anything, Anything (I'll Give You)" (Dramarama) Encore Performance; 5. "Changes" (David Bowie); 6. "We Are the Champions" (Queen); 7. "I Will Survive" (Gloria Gaynor)	8. "Cryin'" (Aerosmith); 9. "Bring Me to Life" (Evanescence) [accompanied by Toby Rand on backing vocals]; Bottom Three Performance: "Helter Skelter" (The Beatles): 10. "Suffragette City" (David Bowie) (accompanied by Dave Navarro on guitar); "Ladylike" (Storm Large) [Contestant played original song] Bottom Three Performance: "Wish You Were Here" (Pink Floyd) Eliminated 09/06/2006
Ryan Star (from Long Island, New York)	1. "Iris" (Goo Goo Dolls) [Contestant played guitar]; 2. "Jumpin' Jack Flash" (The Rolling Stones); 3. "Fortunate Son" (Creedence Clearwater Revival); 4. "I Alone" (Live); 5. "Losing My Religion" (R.E.M.) Contestant played piano Encore Performance; 6. "Paint It Black" (The Rolling Stones); Bottom Three Performance: "Enjoy the Silence" (Depeche Mode): 7. "In the Air Tonight" (Phil Collins) Encore Performance; 8. "Back of Your Car" (Ryan Star) [Contestant played original song and guitar]; 9. "Clocks" (Coldplay) [Contestant played piano]; Bottom Three Performance: "Baba O'Riley" (The Who) Eliminated 08/30/2006 11."Back of Your Car" (Ryan Star) [Contestant played original song] Fan-Selected Verizon Wireless Encore Performance	
Patrice Pike (from Austin, Texas)	1. "Somebody to Love" (Jefferson Airplane); 2. "Heart-Shaped Box" (Nirvana) [Contestant played guitar]; 3. "Helter Skelter" (The Beatles); 4. "Remedy" (The Black Crowes); Bottom Three Performance: "My Iron Lung" (Radiohead): 5. "Higher Ground" (Stevie Wonder/Red Hot Chili Peppers) (accompanied by Tommy Lee on drums); Bottom Three Performance: "Eternal Life" (Jeff Buckley): 6. "Instant Karma!" (John Lennon) [Contestant played guitar]; 7. "Message in a Bottle" (The Police); Bottom Three Performance: "Celebrity Skin" (Hole): 8. "Beautiful Thing" (Patrice Pike) [Contestant played original song and guitar]; Bottom Three Performance: "Middle of the Road" (The Pretenders) Eliminated 08/23/2006	
Zayra Alvarez (from Puerto Rico)	1. "Bring Me to Life" (Evanescence); 2. "You Really Got Me" (The Kinks); Bottom Three Performance: "You Really Got Me" (The Kinks): 3. "Everybody Hurts" (R.E.M.); 4. "Call Me" (Blondie); Bottom Three Performance: "Not an Addict" (K's Choice): 5. "867-5309/Jenny" (Tommy Tutone); 6. "All The Young Dudes" (Mott the Hoople/David Bowie) (accompanied by Magni on guitar); 7. "Lluvia de Mar" (Zayra Alvarez) [Contestant played original song and guitar]; Bottom Three Performance: "Razorblade" (Blue October) Eliminated 08/16/2006	
Jill Gioia (from New York City)	1. "Piece of My Heart" (Janis Joplin); 2. "Violet" (Hole); Bottom Three Performance: "Bring Me to Life" (Evanescence): 3. "All Right Now" (Free); 4. "Brown Sugar" (The Rolling Stones) (Gilby Clarke on guitar); 5. "Don't You (Forget about Me)" (Simple Minds); Bottom Three Performance: "Alone" (Heart): 6. "Mother Mother" (Tracy Bonham); Bottom Three Performance: "Respect" (Aretha Franklin) - Eliminated 08/09/06, along with Josh Logan	
Josh Logan (from Manchester, New Hampshire)	1. "She Talks to Angels" (The Black Crowes); 2. "With Arms Wide Open" (Creed); 3. "Come as You Are" (Nirvana) Contestant played guitar; Bottom Three Performance: "Heart-Shaped Box" (Nirvana): 4. "No Rain" (Blind Melon); 5. "Santeria" (Sublime); 6. "Interstate Love Song" (Stone Temple Pilots) (Tommy Lee on drums) Contestant played guitar; Bottom Three Performance: "Shooting Star" (Bad Company) - Eliminated 08/09/06 along with Jill Gioia	
Dana Andrews (from Augusta, Georgia)	1. "I'm the Only One" (Melissa Etheridge); 2. "Born to Be Wild" (Steppenwolf); 3. "It's My Life" (Bon Jovi); Bottom Three Performance: "High Road Easy" (Sass Jordan): 4. "About a Girl" (Nirvana) Contestant played guitar; 5. "Baba O'Riley" (The Who); Bottom Three Performance: "The House of the Rising Sun" (The Animals) - Eliminated 08/02/06	
Phil Ritchie (from Ocean City, Maryland)	1. "Cult of Personality" (Living Colour); Bottom Three Performance: "Stars" (Switchfoot): 2. "If You Could Only See" (Tonic); 3. "White Rabbit" (Jefferson Airplane) (Jason Newsted on bass); 4. "One Headlight" (The Wallflowers); Bottom Three Performance: "Smoking Umbrellas" (Failure) - Eliminated 07/26/06	
Jenny Galt (from Vancouver, British Columbia)	1. "How You Remind Me" (Nickelback) Contestant played guitar; 2. "Tainted Love" (Soft Cell); 3. "Drive" (Incubus) Contestant played guitar; Bottom Three Performance: "Vasoline" (Stone Temple Pilots) - Eliminated 07/19/06	
Chris Pierson (from Atlanta, Georgia)	1. "Roxanne" (The Police); Bottom Three Performance: "L.A. Woman" (The Doors): 2. "Take Me Out" (Franz Ferdinand); Bottom Three Performance: "If You Could Only See" (Tonic) - Eliminated 07/12/06	
Matt Hoffer (from Chicago, Illinois, born in Denver, Colorado)	1. "Yellow" (Coldplay); Bottom Three Performance: "Planet Earth" (Duran Duran) - Eliminated 07/06/06	

== Episodes ==
=== Week One ===
Performance Episode
All 15 contestants performed cover songs. Most of the rockers were praised for their performances (especially Dilana's version of Lithium and Lukas' version of "Rebel Yell"), but there was one notable bad performance in Chris Pierson's performance of "Roxanne" by The Police. They were judged by Dave Navarro, Tommy Lee, Jason Newsted, Gilby Clarke, and the album's producer Butch Walker.

Elimination Episode
At the beginning of the episode, Supernova wanted to see an encore of one rocker's performance, Dilana's. Phil, Chris, and Matt were placed in the bottom three based on votes from around the world. Magni, Ryan, and Zayra were also in the bottom three at some point during voting. They each performed a cover song of their choosing. Elimination was based on this additional performance and their previous performance. Subsequently, Matt was chosen by the band to be eliminated. Despite praising his previous night's performance of "Yellow" by Coldplay, Supernova claimed that Matt's elimination was based on his song choice; Jason, in particular, had exhorted Matt to "bring the rock" with his selection, and Matt's choice of "Planet Earth" by Duran Duran was seen as not being nearly "rock" enough.

=== Week Two ===
Performance Episode
The 14 contestants again performed cover songs. The judges were the same, with the exception of the album's producer, Butch Walker, who was absent. Jill, who performed "Violet" by Hole, was accused by Dave of imitating Courtney Love by wearing a wedding dress, as she did for the song's video.

Elimination Episode
This week, due to his strong performance, Toby was awarded the Encore performance. Zayra, Jill, and Chris found themselves in the bottom three based on the worldwide vote, while Jenny was singled out as the only other contestant to have at some point been in the bottom three during the voting period. Each one performed the cover song of their choice, and based on that performance as well as their previous performances, the band chose Chris for elimination. Supernova pointed out the fact that Chris was in the bottom three two weeks in row and cited that as the reason as to why he was eliminated. The following week, both Gilby and Dave said they at first felt they had made a mistake by not eliminating Zayra (they both told her they had changed their opinions of her).

=== Week Three ===
"In The Mansion" Episode
The 13 remaining Rockers received lessons from vocal coach Lis Lewis, who has worked with Steve Perry, Rihanna, and Emii, among others. During song selection, an argument arose between Jill and Patrice over the song "Helter Skelter." Josh also frustrated the others by taking Nirvana's "Come As You Are" without checking to see if it was all right with the other members.

Performance Episode
The 13 contestants each performed a cover song. An accompanying note said that on one of the songs, the contestant would be backed by a member of Supernova. This song turned out to be Phil's choice, "White Rabbit" by Jefferson Airplane, with Jason Newsted on bass. Phil received praise for his performance, with Dave pointing out how he had finally added some intensity. Lukas, Magni, Dilana, Zayra, Patrice, and Jill all earned praise from the judges, who agreed that they had been mistaken about Zayra, and were especially impressed with her performance.

Elimination Episode
This week, after Tommy noted the great performances from both Dilana and Jill, Magni was awarded the Encore. Based on the worldwide vote, the three Rockers with the fewest votes were Dana, Jenny, and Josh. Zayra and Ryan were also noted as having been in the bottom three at some point during the voting period. These three Rockers all performed the cover song of their choice, and in the end, Jenny was eliminated. Supernova said that while her performance was much more rock-oriented than before, they were still unsure about her vocals.

=== Week Four ===
"In The Mansion" Episode
The 12 remaining Rockers met with Gilby Clarke, who explained that for their next clinic, they would be separated into three groups to write lyrics and melodies to go along with a song that Supernova had already recorded. The team captains were the three who earned the Encore performances—Dilana, Toby, and Magni. Dilana's team consisted of Lukas, Ryan, and Storm. Toby's team consisted of Phil, Patrice, and Zayra. Magni's team included Josh, Jill, and Dana. Upon hearing all three new songs, Supernova was impressed and declared all three groups winners. Notably, this week's song selection was much more civilized than the previous week's.

Performance Episode
The 12 Rockers each performed a cover song of their choosing. An accompanying note said that the contestant selecting the song "Brown Sugar" would be backed by Gilby Clarke on guitar. Storm Large was highly praised for her performance of Dramarama's "Anything Anything" and did a stage dive after the song's climax. She received a standing ovation and made Rockstar history as the only person ever to do a stage dive. Jill Gioya chose to perform "Brown Sugar" backed by Gilby Clarke. Although Dave praised her performance, Gilby stated that he was annoyed when she started to "grind" against him.

Elimination Episode
The show started with Storm being awarded the Encore for her performance of "Anything, Anything." Per the show's format, Brooke then announced the three Rockers with the fewest votes—Patrice, Phil, and Zayra—with Josh and Jill having also been in the bottom three at some point during the voting period. All three performed cover songs of their choosing. Patrice sang "My Iron Lung" by Radiohead, Zayra sang "Not An Addict" by K's Choice, and Phil sang "Smoking Umbrellas" by Failure. Patrice and Zayra got a standing ovation from Supernova. After some deliberation, the judges stated that all three of the contestants gave great performances.

Despite being complimented by Dave Navarro for his song selection of "Smoking Umbrellas" and Gilby stating that it was his best performance yet, Phil was chosen to be sent home, mainly due to Supernova being unsure if he really wanted to be in the band. Essentially, Phil's elimination was the result of statements he had made to the press that he was primarily in the competition to get free publicity for his band, and was not "stoked" about the music Supernova was creating; while it was cut from the aired show, live attendees at the taping reported that Dave Navarro read from Phil's hometown newspaper of The Daily Times. On the following days Dave Navarro confirmed the reason's for Phil's exit on his MySpace and personal website's blog was a "question of his commitment," rehashing the words read aloud from the article. He also commented on Phil's overall performance and the rumors of scandal from the results show. Dave added that Phil's weekly performances were too similar and he did not seem to heed the advice to change it up, as opposed to Zayra. Dave also referred to the clip of the moment in question, viewable on the YouTube website, which also confirms the interactions between Phil, the band, and him on this night.

=== Week Five ===
"In The Mansion" Episode
Many of the remaining contestants were stunned that Phil was sent home as many of them, especially the guys, believed that Zayra should have been sent home. The 11 remaining contestants met with Jason Newsted. He walked the contestants through the art of stage performances, stating Supernova was aware that they could all sing, but wanted to know if they could actually lead the band. Song selection this week was done differently, with Lukas bringing all the songs outside and laying them on the table. The contestants liked the idea of not being confined and having the long march to the room where the songs are posted. Patrice received the most stress from this when she chose the song "Higher Ground," knowing that Tommy Lee would be playing on the drums.

Performance Episode
The 11 remaining contestants performed their cover songs. Patrice's worries were gone when she was highly praised for the performance of "Higher Ground." Other highly praised performances by the judges were by Dilana, Magni, Ryan, Storm, Dana, Toby, and Josh. Zayra received a moderate level of praise after the band took more time than usual to collect their thoughts on her performance. The only two contestants to receive negative comments were Jill for over-singing "Don't You (Forget About Me)," and Lukas for forgetting most of the lyrics to "Celebrity Skin."

Elimination Episode
At the beginning of the show, Supernova asked the 11 remaining Rockers if they deserved the Encore. Only four Rockers raised their hands, among them Zayra, Storm, Patrice, and a hesitant Ryan. Supernova noted that at this point in the game, everyone should have raised their hands for the Encore. Supernova also stated that it was close in the competition this week with some solid performances, one of them edging the rest out slightly. This night the Encore would belong to Ryan, who reprised his performance of the R.E.M. classic "Losing My Religion" on piano.

The Rockers in the bottom three were Jill, Dana, and Patrice. Toby and Zayra were also in the bottom three at some point during the voting. Jill was the first to sing for her survival in a performance that not only saved her from elimination, but garnered her a standing ovation with her version of Heart's "Alone." Supernova noted that it really said something to them if she Patrice was in the bottom three, even with Tommy playing drums behind her. Before Dana was sent to the bottom three, Brooke asked who missed their house band rehearsals and it turned out to be Toby and Dana. It turns out that Dana missed the rehearsal because she was at a spa. After Supernova deliberated, Dana was sent home, with the band claiming that she was too young and had a long way to go.

=== Week Six ===
"In The Mansion" Episode
As the 10 finalists celebrated their survival in the competition thus far, Gilby arrived on his motorcycle and presented them with new electric guitars from Gibson. Each of the Rockers was instructed to compose lyrics and perform one of Supernova's new tracks. All the contestants left Supernova impressed with their presentations. The next day, Dilana presented the songs to the other Rockers in the dining room. She immediately picked up the song with the opportunity to perform with Gilby Clarke, asking if anyone else wanted to go for it. However, none of the Rockers jumped at this occasion to shine.

Performance Episode
Dilana and Gilby started the show on this night. After their performance, Dave Navarro commented on the fact that no one fought for the chance to perform with Gilby. He went on to proclaim that if it had been up to him, Dilana would have won there and then. Dilana's performance was followed by a stream of great performances by everyone else, such as Magni singing to his family who was flown in for the show, per Supernova's promise. Another noteworthy performance was Zayra performing in a gold unitard and top hat. Magni was again onstage playing guitar for her song selection.

Elimination Episode
Starting the episode, Supernova announced that all the performances from the night before were outstanding, so instead of just one Encore, there would be two. Winning the first Encore by a nose, Lukas performed Radiohead's "Creep." The second Encore of the night went to Magni, with "The Dolphin's Cry" by Live. Supernova surprised the Rockers, announcing that the remaining Rockers at the end of the show would be going to Las Vegas to see the stage at the Hard Rock Hotel and Casino, where the winner would perform with Supernova on New Year's Eve. Brooke then announced the Rockers who landed in the bottom three at some point during the voting. Those Rockers were Jill, Josh, Zayra, Ryan, and Patrice. Dave commented that he was not surprised to see the familiar faces standing as the results were read. Zayra was immediately safe.

The first Rocker to end up in the final bottom three was Jill, who saved herself in every previous bottom three performance. She performed Aretha Franklin's "Respect" for her elimination review. The second Rocker to be in the final three was Josh. Tommy was concerned with Josh being in the bottom three as a result of standing behind his guitar during his performances. In a bold move, Josh announced that he would again be playing his guitar, performing "Shooting Star" by Bad Company. The final Rocker to be in the bottom three who would fight for their survival was Ryan, over Patrice, who had never been in the bottom three and had the Encore in the previous week. Jason commented he was surprised to see this and maybe the audience was confused with his diversity in performances. For this night, the crowd cheered to his selection of Depeche Mode's "Enjoy the Silence," in which he said he arranged especially for what he thought fit Supernova's taste. Impressed with the changing of his performances and growing momentum, Supernova let Ryan off the hook for this week.

In a surprising move, Tommy dropped his axe twice, eliminating both Josh and Jill. The eliminated Rockers showed great poise in their final moments, and self-proclaimed dork Josh jokingly asked if he could still go to Vegas with the rest of the guys.

=== Week Seven ===
"In The Mansion" Episode
Supernova took the remaining Rockers to Las Vegas so they could see the venue where the winning Rocker would make their debut with the band. Then Supernova threw a party where many of the contestants, including Toby and Lukas, get smashed. Upon returning to the mansion to pick songs, Zayra and Ryan discuss who would get to perform the original song. Ryan gives in and lets Zayra take the opportunity. Meanwhile, Toby literally jumped at the chance to play with Gilby Clarke, after Dilana concedes the song choice to him. In return, she proposed that he run around the pool naked, which he did without hesitation.

Performance Episode
Zayra kicked off the show with her original song. Supernova thought she did amazing and that it was a great performance, but still felt like it was not for Supernova. Most of the Rockers were praised for their performances; however, there was one notable exception—Storm Large's rendition of Gloria Gaynor's "I Will Survive." It was not well-received by the members of Supernova or Dave Navarro. Dave said he hated the performance, and Tommy Lee remarked that it was "sautéed in wrong sauce." Patrice also received moderately negative reviews, and was told to "bring the rock." At the end of the show, Dave felt that he had spoken too soon, when he told Ryan that his was the night's top performance, and favored Dilana's as the best of the night.

Elimination Episode
This episode introduced a new segment: "Special Supernova Performance." Each week, in addition to the Encore performance, Supernova would choose a Rocker to sing one of their new songs, backed by members of the band. For this first week, they chose Dilana. Following the original song, Ryan was awarded the Encore, with Jason claiming it as the super dynamic performance for the previous night.

The first Rocker in the bottom three this week was Zayra. She performed an energetic version of "Razorblade," originally performed by Blue October. Supernova noted they had never heard the song before and that both of her performances this week were risky, at best. However, they applauded her for taking these risks. The next Rocker in the bottom three was Patrice, performing "Celebrity Skin" by Hole. Patrice attempted to appeal directly to the band as Dilana had done in prior weeks, walking over to where Supernova was sitting and singing to them. Magni was the last of the bottom three; he chose "Creep" by Radiohead. His song selection was his self-proclaimed anthem, as he laid down on the stage and looked toward the "safe" Rockers when singing the line, "I don't belong here." The songs that Patrice and Magni had chosen were both performed by Lukas Rossi previously. When Supernova was ready to reveal their decision, Magni was sent to the Rockers' pod first, claiming he was "so far from going home."

Ultimately, Zayra was chosen for elimination. She told the audience how much of a roller-coaster ride this had been for her and that we would see her again soon.

=== Week Eight ===
"In The Mansion" Episode
The seven remaining Rockers found themselves in the hot seat when the media came in to interview them. During one of Dilana's interviews, when asked who she hates the most amongst the remaining Rockers, she answered, "Lukas." When Lukas was told how Dilana felt, he responded that he did not need anyone to look after him. Back in the song room, Toby was the one to break the news that two original songs would be performed this week. Ryan felt that since he had to forgo his chance last week, he deserved one. The second original was given to Patrice after Magni said she deserved it for being in the bottom three for the third time. Notably, Toby allowed Dilana to sing the song he wanted if she would run around the pool naked, like he had done the previous week. She did, after which Toby stated that he did not even want the song.

Performance Episode
Patrice opened the show with her original song, "Beautiful Thing." The song choice prompted an echo of Dave's advice to Zayra a few weeks back: seek a solo career. Magni's rendition of "Smells Like Teen Spirit" met with positive reviews, as well as Ryan's performance of his original song, "Back of Your Car." Ryan threw his guitar, which was an expensive move, but he was praised for it. Storm's performance of "Cryin'" was also well-received, as was Dilana's performance of "Every Breath You Take," a song that she readily stripped down (at the mansion) to perform. Toby's rendition of "Layla" was heightened when he took off his shirt, a move that Tommy Lee said made the ladies happy. Lukas capped off the night with his performance of "All These Things That I've Done," his only negative comments being centered on facing away from the audience too much. He also received an ambiguous comment from Tommy Lee. Lee said, "Check, please," and proceeded to throw down the microphone. This comment has been interpreted by Lukas fans as being a positive, while to others as negative ("Check, please," being a statement generally signaling one's desire to leave).

Elimination Episode
The show began with a recap of some of the controversial statements made by Dilana, one of which centered on Ryan's performance. Dilana and Ryan were able to voice their opinions on the situation. It was then announced that Toby was Supernova's choice to sing a Supernova song with them this week, and his performance was well received. After that, there was a recap of "Media Day" at the mansion and, again, some of Dilana's responses to the press were perceived as harsh. The band called her on it, and Dilana explained herself, and then apologized. She dismissed it as a mistake, and she said she would learn from it.

It was then announced that the bottom three included Patrice, Magni, and Toby. Also in the bottom three at some point in the voting was Storm. Magni performed "Fire" by Jimi Hendrix, his second consecutive performance in the bottom three. Patrice performed "Middle of the Road" by The Pretenders, her fourth performance in the Bottom Three. Toby performed "Plush" by Stone Temple Pilots, which convinced the band to send him back first.

Supernova chose Patrice for this week's elimination, explaining that they had to listen to the fans who had placed her in the bottom three for the fourth time. Patrice took the elimination well, stating that this was one of the most amazing experiences of her life. There was no Encore this week due to the time spent on the Media Day discussion.

=== Week Nine ===
"In The Mansion" Episode
When the Rockers arrived back at the mansion, Dilana was still upset by Dave Navarro's words. The next day while she was talking to Lukas and Magni, Dilana became aggravated with herself and her recent performance. In a fit of rage, Dilana flipped off the camera, voiced a profanity, and smashed a wine glass on the floor. A shard of glass hit Magni in the head, cutting him. The following day was to be a photo shoot with InStyle magazine for the rockers. Storm was a natural in front of the camera, but Magni had the most difficult time posing. Later it was revealed to the rockers that the songs they would be performing this week would be chosen by the fans; some of the rockers saw the fan's selections as fitting, while others were troubled by the choices.

Performance Episode
Lukas started the show by singing "Lithium" by Nirvana and was praised by Supernova for his arrangement. Next up was Magni, who has been in the bottom three twice now. He sang "I Alone" by Live and was also praised for his performance, especially by Dave Navarro commenting that "the boy can sing." The fans chose Ryan to sing "Clocks" by Coldplay. He changed the song by rocking it out and also received praise, earning the nickname Ryan "Dark Horse" Star from Dave Navarro. Storm sang "Bring Me to Life" by Evanescence, with Toby helping on the back-up vocals. However, Gilby thought that her performance was not memorable and cited Jill's version as more memorable. Toby performed "Rebel Yell" by Billy Idol, singing it well, and incorporating crowd interaction by inviting girls from the audience onto the stage. Last up was Dilana with "Mother Mother" by Tracy Bonham. Dave Navarro said it was the best performance of Rock Star: INXS and Rock Star: Supernova.

Elimination Episode
Supernova started the show with a recap of the performances. Lukas received the special performance and rocked the house. Next up was the encore sung by Toby. Then, the bottom three performances were Ryan who sang "Baba O'Riley" by The Who, Storm who sang "Helter Skelter" by The Beatles, and Dilana who sang "Psycho Killer" by Talking Heads. With Storm and Dilana in the bottom three for the first time, Lukas remained as the only person not to make a Bottom Three Performance. Notably, Dilana forgot the lyrics to her song.

Supernova decided it was Ryan who was eliminated, citing the reason that they feel that he may not be the perfect fit for the band. Supernova, however, noted the tremendous progress and improvement that Ryan made during his stay on the show and predicted that big things were in store for him and his musical career. In turn, Ryan informed Supernova that they could have made 20 years of great music together, and that he would see them on the record charts.

=== Week 10 ===
"In The Mansion" Episode
Back at the mansion, the Rockers saluted the departure of Ryan, before engaging in a food fight. Afterwards, they listened to the new Supernova track, for which they were all to create melodies and lyrics. The Rockers brought their creations and worked with Gilby in a songwriting clinic where everybody received criticism, except for Storm and Toby. When they returned to the mansion, they found out that, in addition to performing a cover song the following night, they would also be performing an original piece.

Performance Episode
Despite having torn a calf muscle during rehearsals, Dilana opened the show by singing "Behind Blue Eyes" by The Who, followed by her original performance, of which Dave and Tommy had conflicting opinions. Magni was next with the classic "Back in the U.S.S.R." by The Beatles, and then went on to sing his original song, which Supernova enjoyed, except Tommy Lee, who felt that both performances sounded too similar. Storm continued the show with "Suffragette City" by David Bowie with surprise guest Dave Navarro on guitar, along with a memorable original song "Ladylike," which Supernova loved, especially Tommy. Lukas took to the stage next and performed a stripped-down version of Bon Jovi's "Livin' on a Prayer," along with his original song. Supernova applauded both his performances, agreeing that they revealed his softer side. To close the show, Aussie Toby sang "Mr. Brightside" by The Killers, and his original work. Supernova enjoyed his performances, with Gilby mentioning that Toby brought the fun to rock n' roll. Overall, the Rockers' performances this week received positive reviews, as the band had very few criticisms in comparison to other shows. Before the show went off air, the first votes revealed Storm, Dilana, and Magni in the initial bottom three.

Elimination Episode
The show began by Supernova announcing that Magni would be performing with Supernova this week. Later, Brooke Burke surprised the contenders by saying that this week's encore performer would win one of the brand new Honda Ridgelines the contestants were transported in to the gig. The band announced Toby Rand as the winner by singing his catch phrase "Oh Oh Oh Oh Oh Oh" from his original song "Throw It Away." Toby carried an Australian flag on the way to the stage and told everyone that he was dedicating his Encore performance to fellow Aussie, "Crocodile Hunter," Steve Irwin, who had died only days before. Later, Storm, Dilana, and Lukas were this week's bottom three. Storm sung a rendition of Pink Floyd's "Wish You Were Here," which she dedicated to her mother; during the performance Jason Newsted could be seen wiping a tear drop from his eye (he was crying because of the recent death of his bandmate from VoiVod). Next was Dilana who sang Cheap Trick's "I Want You to Want Me". Lukas closed with his original song "Headspin," which he dedicated, just like Storm, to his mother.

After much deliberation, the band chose to send Storm home, but on air, Dave Navarro proclaimed that he would like to play with Storm on future projects, Tommy and Jason also volunteered with implication that Gilby would play too. Dave Navarro lived up to his promise by playing on Storm Large's album Ladylike Side One on the song "Ladylike," which is the same original song she had performed on the show.

=== Finale Week ===
In The Mansion Episode
During their last few days at the mansion, the four remaining rockers reflected on their time spent at their home away from home. For song selection, the rockers were presented with over 150 songs to choose from (all but four of them had been performed at some time or the other during the course of the series); three out of four songs selected for performance night were songs that had not been performed, the exception being "Roxanne." The fourth song was "Comfortably Numb" by Pink Floyd. Lukas and Dilana both wanted the song, but in the end, neither actually kept it. The rockers were instructed by Supernova to perform a song from the list, as well as their original songs.

Performance Episode
As per fans' choice, Ryan Star returned to the show just to perform his hit original song "Back of Your Car" as an opening act. Toby started off with a good performance of "Karma Police" by Radiohead, as well as getting the audience excited with his catchy original, "Throw It Away." Supernova applauded his performance. Next up was Lukas, who sang "Fix You" by Coldplay and a stripped down version of his original, "Headspin." Dilana went next with the song "Roxanne" by The Police. Like all the rest, she then sang her original, "Supersoul," which Supernova enjoyed. Magni finished the show with the Deep Purple song "Hush" followed by his original, "When the Time Comes." However, unlike the other Rockers, Tommy Lee and Jason Newsted had criticisms for Magni's performances, particularly how his original is not as "memorable" as some of the others. Nevertheless, Gilby said that he enjoyed both songs.

Elimination Episode
At the beginning of the show, Magni and Toby were revealed to be in the bottom two. Both of them performed songs that they had done prior. Magni performed 'Fire' and Toby performed “White Wedding” by Billy Idol. Based on these performances, Supernova sent Magni home, commenting that he seemed more like a part of a band instead of the frontman. The three remaining Rockers then each performed a song they felt best represented themselves. Lukas sang “Bitter Sweet Symphony” by The Verve, Dilana performed “Zombie” by The Cranberries, and Toby performed “Somebody Told Me” by The Killers. Based on these performances, the band sent Toby home. After further deliberation, Lukas won and became the frontman for Supernova, which meant that for the second straight season, the winner of Rock Star is a Canadian. Dilana was offered to have her album written and produced by Gilby Clarke. Dave Navarro offered to play on the album.

After the announcement that Lukas had been chosen to front the band, the newly formed Supernova closed the show with a performance of "Be Yourself (and Five Other Clichés)" and "It's All Love" (originally performed with Supernova by Toby and Magni, respectively).

== Elimination chart ==
Contestant	Week 1	Week 2	Week 3	Week 4	Week 5	Week 6	Week 7	Week 8	Week 9	Week 10	Week 11	Week 12	Week 13	
Contestant	Week 1	Week 2	Week 3	Week 4	Week 5	Week 6	Week 7	Week 8	Week 9	Week 10	Week 11	Week 12	Day 98	Finale
Bottom Three	Chris; Phil; Matt	Chris; Jill; Zayra	Dana; Jenny; Josh	Patrice; Phil; Zayra	Dana; Jill; Patrice	Jill; Josh; Ryan	Magni; Zayra; Patrice	Magni; Patrice; Toby	Magni; Patrice; Toby	Dilana; Ryan; Storm	Dilana; Lukas; Storm	(none)		
Bottom Two	Chris; Matt	Chris; Zayra	Jenny; Josh	Zayra; Phil	Dana; Patrice	Josh; Jill	Patrice; Zayra	Patrice; Zayra	Magni; Patrice	Dilana; Ryan	Lukas; Storm	Magni; Toby	Lukas; Toby	Dilana; Lukas
Lukas	Encore	Supernova	SAFE	SAFE	SAFE	Encore	SAFE	SAFE	SAFE	Supernova	Bottom Two	Encore	Bottom Two	Winner $1,000,000
Dilana	Supernova	Encore	SAFE	SAFE	SAFE	SAFE	Encore	Supernova	SAFE	Bottom Two	Bottom Three	Supernova	Supernova	Runner-up $475,000
Toby	Encore	SAFE	SAFE	Supernova	SAFE	SAFE	Bottom Two	SAFE	Supernova	Encore	Encore	Bottom Two	Bottom Two	Eliminated (Day 98)
Magni	SAFE	SAFE	Encore	SAFE	SAFE	Encore	SAFE	Bottom Three	Bottom Two	SAFE	Supernova	Bottom Two	Eliminated (Day 91)	
Storm	SAFE	SAFE	SAFE	Encore	Supernova	SAFE	SAFE	SAFE	Encore	Bottom Three	Bottom Two	Eliminated (Day 84)		
Ryan	SAFE	SAFE	SAFE	SAFE	Encore	Bottom Two	Bottom Three	Encore	SAFE	Bottom Two	Eliminated (Day 77)			
Patrice	SAFE	SAFE	SAFE	Bottom Two	Bottom Three	Supernova	SAFE	Bottom Two	Bottom Two	Eliminated (Day 71)				
Zayra	Bottom Two	Bottom Three	Supernova	Bottom Three	Encore	SAFE	Supernova	Bottom Two	Eliminated (Day 66)					
Jill	Bottom Three	Bottom Two	SAFE	SAFE	Bottom Two	Bottom Three	Bottom Two	Eliminated (Day 59)						
Josh	SAFE	SAFE	Bottom Two	SAFE	SAFE	Bottom Two	Eliminated (Day 52)							
Dana	SAFE	SAFE	Bottom Three	SAFE	Bottom Two	Eliminated (Day 44)								
Phil	SAFE	SAFE	SAFE	Bottom Two	Eliminated (Day 37)									
Jenny	SAFE	SAFE	Bottom Two	Eliminated (Day 31)										
Chris	SAFE	Bottom Two	Eliminated (Day 24)											
Matt	Bottom Two	Eliminated (Day 17)												

== Album ==
Following the series Rock Star Supernova recorded and released their self-titled debut album Rock Star Supernova with the first single being released in September 2006. The album charted at #101 on the Billboard 200 and #4 on the Canadian Albums Chart and was certified Platinum in Canada (over 100,000 units sold). Supernova's first concert performance took place on New Year's Eve at The Joint at the Hard Rock Hotel and Casino in Las Vegas, Nevada. A world tour followed in early 2007.

== House band ==
Five musicians made up the house band that backed the 15 contestants during the show. The house band was made up of Paul Mirkovich, Jim McGorman, Nate Morton, Sasha Krivtsov, and Rafael Moreira. Several of these musicians currently perform as the house band for the NBC show The Voice.
