= Imaginator =

Studio album by Nelson
- Released: December 18, 1996 (Japan); 1998 (US)
- Recorded: 1992
- Studio: Granny's House (Reno, Nevada); Cherokee Studios and Nichols Canyon Studios (Los Angeles, California); Blue Dog Studios (Sherman Oaks, California); Sound City Studios (Van Nuys, California); Santa Fe Studios (Valencia, California); Cactus Studios (Hollywood, California); Enterprise Studios (Burbank, California); Ocean Recording Studios (Ocean Gate, New Jersey)
- Genre: Hard rock
- Length: 49:43
- Label: Victor Entertainment (Japan); Fuel 2000 (US)
- Producer: Matthew Nelson, Gunnar Nelson

Nelson chronology
Because They Can (1995)	Imaginator (1996)	The Silence is Broken (1997)

Imaginator is the third album from American rock group Nelson. It was released in Japan through Victor Entertainment in 1996, and later in the US through Fuel 2000 in 1998.

The album is notable for being the second album recorded by the band, after the success of their debut album, After the Rain. The album was planned to be released around 1993. However, the album was rejected by John Kalodner and the executives at Geffen Records for being too heavy and dark. They gave the band the choice to either record another album, or they would be released from their contract. The band decided to return to the studio and recorded a third album, Because They Can, which ended up being released by Geffen in 1995. The band broke up with Geffen shortly after the release of that album and released Imaginator through a deal with Victor.

== Concept and recording ==
"The theme was: don't rely on technology or on the media to make up your own mind for you, make up your own mind for yourself and make your own decisions on what you like to listen to, what you like to see, what you like to do, how you are supposed to feel. That was what the Imaginator record was really all about. It was speaking against the sort of lucidity that we all seem to get hypnotized into by relying on the media to make up our tastes and our flavors of the minute for us so much.

— Gunnar Nelson (guitarist/singer)

After the success of their first album, After the Rain, and years of touring, Nelson returned to the studio to record their second album. Gunnar Nelson has said on interviews that they were "a little angry too because the whole music industry seemed to change, as well as our own label", referring to how labels and audiences were moving away from the music style that had made them popular at first.

They came up with a concept album that Nelson described as "really dark and brooding and angry". Gunnar described the concept as being "about the machine that is the media. That same machine that built us up and was also ready to tear us down". The album comments on society's dependence on technology and media to make decisions, and how people should take control of their lives and their choices.

Gunnar has also said the band wanted to prove their musicianship and showcase the talent of each member. He has said that the sound of the album is a representation of their live sound at the time.

According to Gunnar Nelson, Imaginator was recorded "in isolation" and nobody from Geffen was involved in the process. He has said that John Kalodner was "too busy making Aerosmith records" and he never visited the studio during the recording, so they decided to continue recording the album they had envisioned, hoping he would like it in the end. He also referred to the process as a "creative catharsis" saying that they felt they were under attack and they were "exorcising our demons, and we brought it into Geffen".

Production began August–September 1992 at Granny's House Recording Studio in Reno, Nevada. Demos were tracked previously at Cherokee Studios in Los Angeles, California. The album was recorded and co-produced by David Holmann who had recorded Olivia Newton-John, Little River Band, Bush and No Doubt. Several tracks originally recorded never ended up on the ultimate release of either the "Imaginator" or "Because They Can" records. Henry Rollins also wrote and recorded a spoken word interlude to be used on the album, though this had to be scrapped when Rollins' record label at the time refused to give permission for it to be used.

== Rejection by Geffen ==
When the band presented Imaginator to John Kalodner and the executives at Geffen, they weren't pleased with it. According to Gunnar Nelson, it "scared the hell out of [them] and basically they wanted to distance themselves from it as quickly as possible". Gunnar referred to it as "a very uncomfortable meeting". The executives at Geffen gave the band the choice to either record another album, more according to what they were expecting, or they would be released from their contract.

On interviews, Gunnar Nelson has compared the album to Metallica's 1991 self-titled album, arguing that Geffen could've had a similar success with Imaginator, if they had released it. However, he says that Geffen was seemingly expecting "After the Rain, Pt. II".

Although the band was frustrated by the reaction at Geffen, they decided to return to the studio to record another album. The result was Because They Can, which was released in 1995. Shortly after, the band broke up with Geffen.

== Release ==
After parting ways with Geffen, Nelson established their own label called Stone Canyon Records. In 1996, they released Imaginator through a partnership with Victor Entertainment in Japan. The album was finally released in the United States in 1998.

== Track listing ==
All tracks are written by Matthew & Gunnar Nelson and Marc Tanner, except where noted.

No.	Title	Writer(s)	Length
1.	"On/Off"		2:44
2.	"Sinners, Inc."		0:34
3.	"Do You Believe in Religion?"	M. Nelson; G. Nelson	3:11
4.	"Kiss Me When I Cry"	M. Nelson; G. Nelson; Jack Ponti	5:13
5.	"I Don't Mess Around, Boy"		0:14
6.	"Sooner or Later"	M. Nelson; G. Nelson; Ponti	4:09
7.	"We Always Want What We Can't Get"	M. Nelson; G. Nelson; Ponti	4:34
8.	"It's Your Body"		0:10
9.	"She Gets Down"	M. Nelson; G. Nelson; Donnie Vie; Chip Z'Nuff	3:55
10.	"Tell Me"	M. Nelson; G. Nelson; M. Alan Raphael	5:25
11.	"Greed"		0:12
12.	"Action" (Sweet cover)	Andy Scott; Brian Connolly; Steve Priest; Mick Tucker	3:36
13.	"Ain't Nothin' Really Changed"		0:34
14.	"We're All Alright"	M. Nelson; G. Nelson; Vie; Z'Nuff	4:22
15.	"Judas Mirror"	M. Nelson; G. Nelson	5:33
16.	"In a Perfect World"		0:35
17.	"Imaginator"	M. Nelson; G. Nelson	4:42
Total length:			49:43

== Personnel ==
Musicians

- Matthew Nelson – lead vocals, bass
- Gunnar Nelson – lead vocals, guitars
- Paul Mirkovich – keyboards, vocals
- Brett Garsed – lead guitars
- Joey Cathcart – guitars, vocals
- Bobby Rock – drums

Additional musicianship

- Dave Alford
- Brian Burwell
- Amir Derakh
- Michael Raphael
- Danny Simons
- John Stevens
- Matt Thorne
- Zeki

=== Production ===
- John Boylan – executive producer, recording
- Matthew Nelson – producer, recording
- Gunnar Nelson – producer, recording
- David J. Holman – co-producer, recording, mixing (1, 2, 4–14, 16, 17)
- Guy DeFazio – associate producer, recording, mixing (3, 15)
- Vic Pepe – recording
- Michael Raphael – recording
- Matt Thorne – recording
- Stephen Benben – mixing (1, 2, 4–14, 16, 17)
- Ron Boustead – digital editing
- Stephen Marcussen – mastering at Precision Mastering (Hollywood, California)
- Aki Ukawa – album artwork
- Tomoko Miura – album art coordinator
- Ken Davis – cover photography
- William Hames – band and tray photography
- The Left Bank Organization – management
- Henry Rollins – liner notes
