= Ain't No Mountain High Enough: A Tribute to Hitsville U.S.A. =

Studio album by Michael Bolton
- Released: February 26, 2013
- Studio: Ocean Way Recording (Hollywood, California); Westlake Audio (Los Angeles, California); Ocean Studios (Burbank, California); Passion Studios (Westport, Connecticut); Jungle City Studios and Germano Studios (New York City, New York)
- Genre: Pop
- Length: 32:47
- Label: Montaigne
- Producer: Michael Bolton; Paul Mirkovich; Dave Tozer

Michael Bolton chronology
Gems: The Duets Collection (2011)	Ain't No Mountain High Enough: A Tribute to Hitsville U.S.A. (2013)	Songs of Cinema (2017)

Professional ratings
Review scores
Source	Rating
AllMusic	link

Ain't No Mountain High Enough: A Tribute to Hitsville U.S.A. is the 22nd studio album by Michael Bolton. It features recordings of songs originally made famous by various artists during the Motown era. It became his highest charting studio album in the US since 2002.

== Track listing ==
1. "Ain't No Mountain High Enough" (featuring Kelly Rowland) – 2:49
2. "How Sweet It Is (To Be Loved by You)" – 3:13
3. "Ain't Nothing Like the Real Thing" (featuring Melanie Fiona) – 2:36
4. "Gotta Keep Dreaming" (Michael Bolton, Andrea Martin, Ron Pope, Dave Tozer) – 4:33
5. "Nowhere to Run" – 3:03
6. "The Way You Do the Things You Do" – 3:10
7. "You Keep Me Hangin' On" – 3:07
8. "What's Going On" (featuring Michael Lington) – 3:29
9. "Tracks of My Tears" – 3:59
10. "Signed, Sealed, Delivered (I'm Yours)" – 2:51
11. "Money (That's What I Want)" (featuring Orianthi) – 2:30 **Featured on European release
12. "Somethin' Out of Nothin" (Bolton, Walter Afanasieff, Lamont Dozier) – 4:12 **Featured on European release
  - "Ain't No Mountain High Enough" (featuring Leona Lewis) featured on European release.
  - "Ain't No Mountain High Enough" (featuring Delta Goodrem) featured on Australian release.
  - "Ain't Nothing Like the Real Thing" (featuring Sam Bailey) featured on European release.

== Personnel ==
- Michael Bolton – vocals
- Eric Daniels – keyboards (1–3, 5–10), Hammond B3 organ (1–3, 5–10)
- Paul Mirkovich – keyboards (1–3, 5–10), acoustic piano (1–3, 5–10), Wurlitzer electric piano (1–3, 5–10), synthesizers (1–3, 5–10), programming (1–3, 5–10), string arrangements (1, 3, 8), horn arrangements (2, 5, 6, 9, 10)
- Dave Tozer – keyboards (4), programming (4), guitars (4), bass (4), string arrangements (4)
- Mark Williams – acoustic piano (4), guitars (4), bass (4), string arrangements (4)
- David Delhomme – Hammond B3 organ (4)
- Justin Derrico – guitars (1–3, 5–10)
- Michael Thompson – guitars (4)
- Sasha Krivtsov – bass
- Nate Morton – drums, percussion (1–3, 5–10)
- Lenny Castro – percussion (4)
- Miguel Gandelman – baritone saxophone (2, 5, 6, 9, 10), tenor saxophone (2, 5, 6, 9, 10)
- Michael Lington – saxophone solo (6, 8)
- Ryan Porter – trombone (2, 5, 6, 9, 10)
- Chris Gray – trumpet (2, 5, 6, 9, 10)
- Ray Monteiro – trumpet (2, 5, 6, 9, 10)
- Richard Dodd – cello (1, 3, 8)
- David Low – cello (4)
- Lauren Chipman – viola (1, 3, 8)
- Luke Maurer – viola (4)
- Daphne Chen – violin (1, 3, 8)
- Eric Gorfain – violin (1, 3, 8)
- Ana Landauer – violin (4)
- Mark Robertson – violin (4)
- Jeremy Rubolino – orchestration (4)
- Kelly Rowland – vocals (1)
- Angie Fisher – backing vocals (2, 5–10)
- Aretha Scruggs – backing vocals (2, 5–10)
- Toni Scruggs – backing vocals (2, 5–10)
- Melanie Fiona – vocals (3)
- Suzie Benson – backing vocals (3)
- Andrea Martin – backing vocals (4)
- Monét Owens – backing vocals (4)
- Melanie Taylor – backing vocals (4)
- Jessyca Wilson – backing vocals (4)

=== Production ===
- Christina Kline – A&R, management
- Michael Bolton – executive producer, producer
- Paul Mirkovich – producer (1–3, 5–10)
- Dave Tozer – producer (4)
- Steve Milo – production coordinator
- Richard Nelson – art direction, design
- Helen Burnett, Virginia Fernando and Michael Karlin – business management

Technical

- Brad Blackwood – mastering at Euphonic Masters (Memphis, Tennessee)
- David Reitzas – instrumental recording, recording (1–3, 5–10)
- Jorge Velasco – recording engineer, vocal recording (1–3, 5, 6, 8–10), vocal recording for Kelly Rowland (1), horn recording (2, 5, 6, 9, 10), mixing (3, 4, 8), additional vocal recording (4, 7), sax solo recording (6, 8)
- Beau Vallis – vocal recording for Kelly Rowland (1)
- Stuart White – vocal recording for Melanie Fiona (3)
- Jason Agel – engineer (4)
- Dave Tozer – engineer (4)
- Mick Guzauski – mixing (1, 2, 5–7, 9, 10)
- Steve Milo – additional vocal recording (1–3, 8, 9)
- Rouble Kapoor – recording assistant (1–3, 5–10)
- Rob Suchecki – vocal recording assistant for Melanie Fiona (3)
- Brian Dong – recording assistant (4)

== Charts ==
Chart (2013)	Peak position
US Billboard Top R&B/Hip-Hop Albums	5
UK Pop Albums	19
US Billboard 200	38
Australian Albums (ARIA)	79
