= Because They Can =

Studio album by Nelson
- Released: June 21, 1995 (Japan)
- Studio: Sound City Studios (Van Nuys, CA); Capitol Studios, Cactus Studios and Conway Studios (Hollywood, CA); Studio F, Nichols Canyon Studios and Quarkbrain Studios (Los Angeles, CA); Granny's House (Reno, Nevada); Caravell Recording Studios (Branson, Missouri)
- Genre: Pop rock
- Length: 55:26
- Label: Geffen
- Producer: John Boylan; Matthew Nelson; Gunnar Nelson; David J. Holman

Nelson chronology
After the Rain (1990)	Because They Can (1995)	Imaginator (1996)

Because They Can is the second album from American rock group Nelson, released by Geffen Records in 1995.

The album had a shaky production history as a result of creative differences between brothers Matthew and Gunnar Nelson and the Geffen Records executives, the latter led by John Kalodner. After the success of their debut album, After the Rain, the band recorded the heavier and darker follow-up Imaginator. When Kalodner and other Geffen executives were displeased with it, Nelson was told to record a lighter album. After more than a year of writing and recording, Nelson came up with Because They Can. The band left Geffen shortly after the release of the album.

== Background and recording ==
"We basically stripped away everything and tried to make the songs work for themselves. And that's basically what we were left with. I am very proud of this piece of work even though the process was very painful."

— Gunnar Nelson (guitarist/singer)

After the success of their first album, After the Rain, and years of touring, Nelson returned to the studio to record their second album. They came up with a darker and harder, concept album titled Imaginator. However, when they presented the album to producer John Kalodner and the executives at Geffen Records, they weren't pleased. They then gave the band the choice to either record another album, more according to what they were expecting, or they would be released from their contract. The band decided to return to the studio and began working on a more acoustic-oriented album which was, according to Gunnar, "180 degrees in the opposite direction of Imaginator".

Because They Can was recorded at various studios such as Sound City, Studio F, Nichols Canyon Studios, Caravell Studios, Granny's House, Capitol Studios, Cactus Studios and Quarkbrain Studio. It featured original band members Brett Garsed, Paul Mirkovich, Joey Cathcart and Bobby Rock on most of the songs, and it featured guest musicians such as Mike Baird, Don Felder, Steve Porcaro and others. The album was mixed at Conway Studios.

"Won't Walk Away" was originally demoed in 1985 and an early version was performed during their 1986 Saturday Night Live appearance. Nelson reworked the song with Jack Ponti and recorded the song as studio track for this album.

== Reception ==
Professional ratings
Review scores
Source	Rating
AllMusic	2/5 stars

Because They Can was released in 1995, five years after the release of Nelson's first album. According to Gunnar Nelson, Geffen was not "going to put any money into promoting it". The album went mostly unnoticed and did not appear on the Billboard charts. "(You Got Me) All Shook Up" was released to radio and video outlets, and peaked at #30 on the Radio & Records Pop chart. On another interview, Gunnar said about the album "I’m really proud of [it], but our fanbase had gone away. Everybody had changed their musical tastes, and it was really kind of a drag".

Gunnar has also noted that People gave them the "best bad review in the history of rock 'n' roll" for Because They Can writing only "Maybe they shouldn’t". He has argued that a lot of the negative reviews they had were just based on their legacy and not in the actual music.

== Track listing ==
All tracks are written by Matthew & Gunnar Nelson and Marc Tanner, except where noted.

No.	Title	Writer(s)	Length
1.	"(You Got Me) All Shook Up"		4:42
2.	"The Great Escape"		5:25
3.	"Five O'Clock Plane"		5:00
4.	"Cross My Broken Heart"	Danny Tate	4:47
5.	"Peace on Earth"	Taylor Rhodes	4:30
6.	"Remi"		2:27
7.	"Won't Walk Away"	Jack Ponti	3:51
8.	"Only a Moment Away"		4:22
9.	"Joshua Is With Me Now"		1:30
10.	"Love Me Today"	M. Nelson; G. Nelson	4:19
11.	"Be Still"	M. Nelson; G. Nelson	4:14
12.	"Right Before Your Eyes"	Rhodes	4:51
13.	"Nobody Wins in the End"		5:28
Total length:			55:26

== Personnel ==
Musicians

- Matthew Nelson – co-lead vocals (1–5, 8, 11–13), backing vocals (1–5, 7, 8, 10–13), 12-string electric guitar (1), 12-string acoustic guitar (1, 2, 4, 5, 7), rhythm guitar (1, 2), bass guitar (1–5, 7, 8, 10, 12, 13), high-string acoustic guitar (3, 4), lead vocals (7, 10), 12-string guitar (8, 10), acoustic bass (11)
- Gunnar Nelson – lead vocals (1–5, 8, 11–13), acoustic guitar (1, 3–5, 8, 10–13), second lead guitar solo (1), mandolin (1), tambourine (1–3, 5, 8), castanets (3), gut-string acoustic guitar solo (4), backing vocals (4, 5, 7, 10–12), bells (5), shaker (5), co-lead vocals (7, 10), rhythm guitar (7, 8), "verse" guitar (8), second guitar solo (12), "second verse" guitar solo (13)
- Paul Mirkovich – Hammond organ (1, 4, 5, 7, 11, 12), acoustic piano (3, 7, 12, 13), harmonium (3, 4), backing vocals (7, 11), melodica (12), string arrangements (13)
- Steve Porcaro – keyboards (3)
- Joey Cathcart – high-string acoustic guitar (1), first lead guitar solo (1), backing vocals (1, 2, 4, 5, 7, 8, 11–13), acoustic guitar (2), 12-string electric guitar (2), electric rhythm guitar (4), lead guitar (5, 8), rhythm guitar (5, 7, 8, 12, 13), slide guitar (8, 11), dobro (11), scat (11), first guitar solo (12)
- Kenneth Blackwell – additional mandolin (1)
- Brett Garsed – 12-string electric guitar (3), rhythm guitar (3, 7), electric lead guitar (4), acoustic guitar (7, 11, 12), backing vocals (7, 11), high-string acoustic guitar (12), second guitar solo (13)
- Don Felder – mandolin (3)
- Jeff Baxter – pedal steel guitar (4)
- Elliot Easton – lead guitar (7), first guitar solo (13)
- Mike Baird – drums (1–3)
- Mike Botts – drums (4)
- Bobby Rock – drums (5, 7, 11–13)
- David Campbell – string arrangements (10)
- Jimmie Haskell – string arrangements (13)
- Sid Sharp – concertmaster (10, 13)
- Gerry Beckley – backing vocals (1, 2, 8)
- Timothy B. Schmit – backing vocals (1–3, 8)
- Mark Lennon – backing vocals (3, 4, 10)
- Marc Tanner – backing vocals (13)

=== Production ===
- John Kalodner – executive producer
- Gunnar Nelson – producer
- Matthew Nelson – producer
- John Boylan – producer (1–5, 7, 8, 10–12)
- David J. Holman – producer (6, 9, 13), engineer (7, 11, 13)
- Guy DeFazio – engineer (1–5, 7, 8, 10, 12, 13), mixing (10)
- Paul Grupp – engineer (1–5, 8, 10, 12), mixing (3)
- Frank Wolf – engineer (1, 2, 8)
- Jeff Sheehan – assistant engineer (1–5, 8, 12)
- Barry Taylor – assistant engineer (4, 12)
- Tom Gordon – assistant engineer (7, 13)
- Bjorn Thorsrud – assistant engineer (7, 13)
- Peter Doell – assistant engineer (10)
- Chris Henderson – assistant engineer (11)
- Andrew Gold – assistant engineer (12)
- Mick Guzauski – mixing (1–5, 7, 8, 11–13)
- Marnie Riley – mix assistant (1–5, 7, 8, 10–13)
- George Marino – mastering at Sterling Sound (New York, NY)

Art

- Robin Sloane – art direction
- William Wegman – photography
- Teri Weigel and John Boylan – additional photography
- Debra Shellman – product manager
- Teri Weigel – album coordinator
