= Songs of Cinema =

Studio album by Michael Bolton
- Released: February 10, 2017
- Studio: MXM Studios, Westlake Studios, VAM Studio and Beta Petrol, PDX (Los Angeles, California); Henson Recording Studios, Capitol Studios and Ocean Way Recording (Hollywood, California); WallyWorld Studios (Studio City, California); Passion Studios (Westport, Connecticut); The Beach House (Miami Beach, Florida); Milkos Studio, Studio Red Room and Studio Willow-Valley (Gothenburg, Sweden)
- Genre: Pop
- Length: 35:50
- Label: Frontiers
- Producer: Michael Bolton; Johan Carlsson; Dapo Torimiro; Walter Afanasieff; Paul Mirkovich; Greg Chun; Rudy Pérez; Akiva Schaffer

Michael Bolton chronology
Ain't No Mountain High Enough: A Tribute to Hitsville U.S.A. (2013)	Songs of Cinema (2017)

Songs of Cinema is the 23rd studio album by American singer Michael Bolton. The album was released on February 10, 2017, by Frontiers Records. The album contains a ballad version of Bolton's song with The Lonely Island, "Jack Sparrow". Bolton promoted the album in a guest appearance on Screen Junkies' series Honest Trailers, in a trailer for the film Willy Wonka and the Chocolate Factory.

== Track listing ==
No.	Title	Writer(s)	Producer(s)	Length
1.	"When a Man Loves a Woman" (2017 version) (from When a Man Loves a Woman)	Calvin Houston Lewis; Andrew James Wright	Johan Carlsson	3:56
2.	"Stand by Me" (from Stand by Me)	Jerry Lieber; Mike Stoller; Ben E. King	Dapo Torimiro	2:57
3.	"I've Got a Woman" (from Ray)	Ray Charles; Renald Richard	Carlsson	3:21
4.	"I Will Always Love You" (featuring Dolly Parton) (from The Bodyguard)	Dolly Parton	Carlsson	3:36
5.	"Old Time Rock and Roll" (from Risky Business)	George Jackson; Thomas Jones III	Walter Afanasieff; Michael Bolton	3:07
6.	"I Heard It Through the Grapevine" (from The Big Chill)	Barrett Strong; Norman Whitfield	Bolton; Paul Mirkovich	4:06
7.	"Cupid" (from Michael Bolton's Big, Sexy Valentine's Day Special)	Sam Cooke	Greg Chun; Bolton	3:10
8.	"Somewhere Over the Rainbow" (from The Wizard of Oz)	Harold Arlen; E.Y. "Yip" Harburg	Rudy Pérez; Bolton	3:28
9.	"As Time Goes By" (from Casablanca)	Herman Hupfeld	Torimiro	3:17
10.	"Jack Sparrow" (ballad) (from The Lonely Island SNL digital video short)	Jorma Taccone; Andrew Samberg; Akiva Schaffer; Michael Woods	Chun; Schaffer	1:43

== Personnel ==
- Michael Bolton – vocals, additional arrangements (2), arrangements (5)
- Johan Carlsson – programming (1–4), Hammond B3 organ (1, 3, 4), arrangements (1–4), percussion (2), shaker (2, 4), tambourine (2, 4), additional arrangements (2), acoustic piano (4), synthesizers (4), acoustic guitars (4), electric guitar (4)
- Mattias Bylund – Wurlitzer electric piano (1, 3)
- David Delhomme – Hammond B3 organ (1, 3)
- Dapo Torimiro – acoustic piano (2), Hammond B3 organ (2), programming (2, 9), acoustic guitars (2), guitar solo (2), bass (2), drums (2), arrangements (2, 9), instruments (9)
- Walter Afanasieff – acoustic piano (5), Hammond B3 organ (5), synth bass (5), arrangements (5)
- Paul Mirkovich – keyboards (6), acoustic piano (6), Wurlitzer electric piano (6), synthesizers (6), programming (6), horn and string arrangements (6)
- Eric Daniels – keyboards (6), Hammond B3 organ (6)
- Greg Chun – acoustic piano (7), strings (7), trumpet (7), arrangements (7, 10), instruments (10), programming (10)
- Rory Doggett – organ (7), pedal steel guitar (7), ukulele (7), bass (7), drums (7), percussion (7), arrangements (7)
- John Sarafian – guitars (1, 3, 4)
- Per Strandberg – guitars (1, 3, 4)
- Michael Thompson – acoustic guitars (2), electric guitars (2, 8), lead guitars (5), additional guitars (5, 6), guitars (7)
- Joe Walsh – lead guitar (5)
- Tim Pierce – additional guitars (5)
- Justin Derrico – guitars (6)
- Rudy Perez – all rhythm guitars (8), nylon guitar fills (8), bass (8), rhythm track arrangements (8)
- Brian Monroney – nylon guitar fills (8)
- Michael Engström – bass (1, 3, 4)
- Sasha Krivtsov – bass (6)
- Miko Rezler – drums (1, 3)
- John Robinson – drums (5), percussion (5), tambourine (5)
- Nate Morton – drums (6), percussion (6)
- Richard Bravo – drums (8), percussion (8)
- David Bukovinszky – cello (1, 3, 4)
- Richard Dodd – cello (6)
- Lauren Chipman – viola (6)
- Mattias Johansson – violin (1, 3, 4)
- Daphne Chen – violin (6)
- Eric Gorfain – violin (6)
- Wojek Goral – alto saxophone (3)
- Tomas Jonsson – baritone saxophone (3), tenor saxophone (3)
- Jason Peterson Delaire – sax solo (3, 9)
- Miguel Gandelman – baritone saxophone (6), tenor saxophone (6)
- Ryan Porter – trombone (6)
- Jan-Anders Bjerger – trumpet (3)
- Chris Gray – trumpet (6)
- Ray Monteiro– trumpet (6)
- Nils-Petter Ankarblom – string arrangements (1, 3, 4), horn arrangements (3)
- Chris Walden – string arrangements (8)
- Mabvuto Carpenter – backing vocals (1, 2, 3)
- Monét Owens – backing vocals (1, 2)
- Eric Dawkings – backing vocals (2)
- Sheree Brown – backing vocals (3)
- Dolly Parton – vocals (4)
- Luke Edgemon – backing vocals (5)
- Missi Hale – backing vocals (5)
- Angela Fisher – backing vocals (6)
- Aretha Scruggs – backing vocals (6)
- Toni Scruggs – backing vocals (6)

== Production ==
- Michael Bolton – executive producer
- Christina Kline – A&R, management
- Johan Carlsson – vocal production (1, 3, 4)
- Peter Karlsson – vocal production (1, 3, 4)
- Greg Chun – vocal production (10)
- Akiva Schafer – vocal production (10)
- Steve Milo – production coordinator
- Diana Flores – art direction, design
- Timothy White – photography

Technical

- Ted Jensen – mastering at Sterling Sound (New York City, New York)
- Jorge Velasco – recording engineer, engineer (1–4, 7, 9, 10), mixing (2, 4–6, 9, 10), additional engineer (5), horns recording (6), vocal recording (6)
- Mattias Bylund – string recording and editing (1, 3, 4)
- Johan Carlsson – mixing (1, 3, 4), additional recording (2)
- Tyler Gordon – engineer (5)
- David Reitzas – recording (6), MB vocal recording (8)
- Brent Asbury – mixing (7)
- Andres Bermudez – recording (8), mixing (8)
- Michael Bolton – additional recording (2)
- Steve Milo – additional vocal recording (6, 8), additional engineer (6, 8), vocal recording (7)
- Rouble Kapoor – assistant engineer (6)
- David Lopez – assistant engineer (8)
- Chris Brooke – assistant vocal engineer (8)

== Charts ==
Chart (2017)	Peak position
Australian Albums (ARIA)	81
German Albums (Offizielle Top 100)	90
Scottish Albums (OCC)	42
UK Albums (OCC)	46
US Billboard 200	177
