= Dark Matter (disambiguation) =

In cosmology, dark matter is matter that emits no detectable radiation, but whose presence can be inferred from gravitational effects.

Dark Matter(s) or Darkmatter may also refer to:

== Science ==
- Biological dark matter, unclassified or poorly understood genetic material
- Dark matter (economics)

== Literature ==
- Dark Matter (Reeves-Stevens novel), a 1990 novel by Garfield Reeves-Stevens
- Dark Matter (Zeh novel), a 2007 novel by Juli Zeh
- Dark Matter (Paver novel), a 2010 novel by Michelle Paver
- Dark Matter (Crouch novel), a 2016 novel by Blake Crouch
- Dark Matter (prose anthologies), an anthology series of science fiction, fantasy, and horror by writers of African descent
- Dark Matter (comics), a comic book series

== Film, radio, and television ==
=== Television ===
- "Dark Matter", a 2019 episode of Dark
- "Dark Matter" (Numb3rs), a 2005 episode of Numb3rs
- Dark Matter (2015 TV series), a space television series based on the comic book series
- Dark Matter (2024 TV series), a science fiction television series based on the Blake Crouch novel
- "Dark Matter" (Lewis), a 2010 television episode
- "Dark Matters" (The Outer Limits), a 1995 television episode
- Dark Matters, a 2015 web television series, prelude for 2015 television series Heroes Reborn
- Dark Matters: Twisted But True, a 2011 Science Channel television series
- Warp Darkmatter, a character in the animated series Buzz Lightyear of Star Command
- "Dark Matters" (The Night Agent), a 2026 television episode

=== Others ===
- Art Bell's Dark Matter, an American radio talk show on Sirius XM Radio
- Dark Matter (film), a 2007 film by Chen Shi-zheng
- Dark Matter, the film distribution arm of the Australian production company Bunya Productions

== Games ==
- Dark•Matter, a role-playing game campaign setting
- Dark Matter (video game), a 2013 indie metroidvania/survival horror video game
- Dark Matter (Kirby), a recurring antagonist in the Kirby video-game series
- DarkMatter (programming), a collection of 3D models by The Game Creators
- Teitoku Kakine, known as Dark Matter, a character in the Japanese light novel series A Certain Magical Index

== Music ==
- Dark Matter (IQ album), 2004
- Dark Matter (Brett Garsed album), 2011
- Dark Matter (The Word Alive album), 2016
- Dark Matter (Randy Newman album), 2017
- Dark Matter, an album by Les Friction, 2017
- Dark Matters (The Rasmus album), 2017
- Dark Matter (Moses Boyd album), 2020
- Dark Matter (CamelPhat album), 2020
- Dark Matter (Pearl Jam album), 2024
- Dark Matters (The Stranglers album), 2021
- Emre (Dark Matter), an experimental music compilation album
- Dark Matters, a concept album by Devin Townsend, released as the second part of Z²
- "Darkmatter", a song by Andrew Bird from Armchair Apocrypha
- "Dark Matter" (Pearl Jam song), 2024
- "Dark Matter", a song by Porcupine Tree from Signify
- "Dark Matter", a song by Björk from Biophilia
- "Dark Matter", a song by The Crüxshadows from As the Dark Against My Halo
- "Dark Matter", a song by Lagwagon from Railer

== Other uses ==
- DarkMatter (spoken word), queer South Asian artists
- DarkMatter (Emirati company), a technology company from the UAE
