= After the Rain (Nelson album) =

Studio album by Nelson
- Released: June 26, 1990
- Recorded: February–May 1990
- Studios: Cherokee Studios (Los Angeles, California); Studio B (Hollywood, California)
- Genres: Glam metal; arena rock; pop rock
- Length: 45:29
- Label: DGC
- Producers: Marc Tanner; David Thoener

Nelson chronology
After the Rain (1990)	Because They Can (1995)

Singles from After the Rain
- 1. "(Can't Live Without Your) Love and Affection" Released: May 19, 1990; 2. "After the Rain" Released: 3 November 1990; 3. "More Than Ever" Released: March 1991; 4. "Only Time Will Tell" Released: June 1991

After the Rain is the debut album by American rock group Nelson, released by DGC Records on June 26, 1990. The album was a commercial success, peaking at number 17 on the Billboard 200 and spending 64 weeks on the charts. It contained the #1 hit, "(Can't Live Without Your) Love and Affection" which was also a gold single. The follow-up single, "After the Rain", also reached the Hot 100's top 10, peaking at #6 in February 1991. The album was eventually certified double platinum by RIAA.

== Writing and composition ==
The twin sons of Ricky Nelson, Matthew and Gunnar Nelson decided to approach Geffen Records for a record deal. They began talks with A&R executive John Kalodner. According to Gunnar, they met with Kalodner "every month for a year", during which he filtered the songs they brought him until they had enough for an album. Most of the songs of the album were co-written with Marc Tanner, who was introduced to the band by Tom Vickers. Gunnar Nelson described the collaborating process in an interview as "magical" and praised Tanner for being "very supportive of our own instincts and our melodic sense". Tanner also produced the album.

After a year of meeting with Kalodner without being signed, Matthew and Gunnar met with him alone, against the wishes of their managers, and played an acoustic version of "(Can't Live Without Your) Love and Affection". Kalodner was so impressed that the band was signed the next day. As they prepared to record, Matthew and Gunnar started assembling a band. They settled on drummer Bobby Rock, Joey Cathcart, Brett Garsed, and Paul Mirkovich. Mirkovich also contributed an "Interlude" to the album.

In the making of the album, there were several issues in creating the album. One was that Gunnar could not play guitar. Gunnar stated "But what if I took a year off and all I did for that year was play guitar for 10 hours a day, every day?" Gunnar ended up studying and learning how to play. Another issue was their songwriting. Then another issue was the producers for the album: they had to fight the label to get Tanner behind production, and they were initially supposed to work with Duane Baron and John Purdell, which both never worked out. Eventually, they worked with Tanner and co-producer David Thoener, who helped shape Nelson's influences into a modern, radio-friendly sound.

== Recording ==
After the Rain was recorded at Cherokee Studios in Los Angeles, and Studio B in Hollywood. According to Gunnar Nelson, they weren't "intimidated" by the process, despite being relatively new to the industry. He also credits co-writer and producer Marc Tanner for keeping them focused.

According to the Nelsons, Geffen producer John Kalodner "basically let us do our own thing". Gunnar has said that Kalodner's process of filtering songs before signing them helped them sort out their material and made it easy for them to come up with the songs for the album.

== Reception ==
Professional ratings
Review scores
Source	Rating
AllMusic	4.5/5 stars
Chicago Tribune	1.5/4 stars
Robert Christgau	D+

After the Rain was released on June 26, 1990, and became an instant success, peaking at No. 17 on the Billboard 200. It also demonstrated staying power, remaining in the charts for 64 weeks. The album was eventually certified double platinum by RIAA after selling more than 2,000,000 copies. As a result of the success of the album, the band began a world tour with over 300 concerts.

The Chicago Tribune noted that "the Nelsons are decent enough guitar players and singers, but have yet to put together a strong sound for their band, which relies heavily on '70s-style riffs that vaguely recall Boston and Foreigner".

== Aftermath ==
After finishing the touring cycle for After the Rain, the band found themselves in massive debt despite the album's success. Nelson returned to the studio and recorded their second album, Imaginator, but it was rejected by their producer and the label for being too dark and heavy. Shelving that album, the band recorded a new collection of songs which became their second release Because They Can in 1995, five years after their debut. By this time, fans had moved on, and the record failed to chart, bringing Nelson's relationship with the label to an end.

== Track listing ==
All tracks are written by Matthew & Gunnar Nelson and Marc Tanner, except where noted.

No.	Title	Writer(s)	Length
1.	"(Can't Live Without Your) Love and Affection"		3:55
2.	"I Can Hardly Wait"		4:20
3.	"After the Rain"	M. Nelson; G. Nelson; Tanner; Rick Wilson	4:05
4.	"Tracy's Song/Only Time Will Tell"	M. Nelson; G. Nelson; Eric Hilliard Nelson	5:15
5.	"More Than Ever"		3:23
6.	"(It's Just) Desire"	M. Nelson; G. Nelson; Tanner; Craig Stull	4:24
7.	"Fill You Up"		4:38
8.	"Interlude/Everywhere I Go"	Paul Mirkovich	6:32
9.	"Bits and Pieces"	M. Nelson; G. Nelson; Tanner; Wilson	4:02
10.	"Will You Love Me?"	M. Nelson; G. Nelson; Brad Bailey	4:20
Total length:			45:29

Japanese special edition bonus MVCG-53
No.	Title	Writer(s)	Length
13.	"Too Many Dreams"	M. Nelson; G. Nelson; Tanner; Wilson	4:15
14.	"Keep One Heart"	M. Nelson; G. Nelson	4:54
Total length:			54:39

== Personnel ==
Nelson

- Matthew Nelson – lead and backing vocals, electric guitars, acoustic guitars, 12-string guitar, bass guitars, programming, drum programming
- Gunnar Nelson – lead and backing vocals, rhythm guitars, 12-string guitar, gut-string guitar, guitar solo (4, 10)
- Brett Garsed – all intercontinental lead guitars, rhythm guitars, acoustic 6 and 12-string guitars, backing vocals
- Paul Mirkovich – all keyboards, grand piano, strings, backing vocals
- Joey Cathcart – additional instruments, backing vocals
- Bobby Rock – drums

Additional musicians

- Robert O. Ragland – Synclavier arrangement (2, 4)
- Stephen Klong – programming, drum programming
- Scott Douglas MacLachlan – backing vocals

=== Production ===
- John Kalodner – producer
- Marc Tanner – producer
- David Thoener – producer, engineer, mixing
- David Holman – additional mixing
- Jack Benson – recording assistant at Cherokee Studios (Los Angeles, California)
- Leon Granados – recording assistant at Studio B (Hollywood, California)
- Nick Els – recording assistant at Studio B (Hollywood, California)
- Rick Norman – mix assistant
- Scotty Ralston – mix assistant
- Soundworks West (Hollywood, California) – mixing location
- Greg Fulginiti – mastering at Artisan Sound Recorders (Los Angeles, California)
- David Donnelly – mastering supervisor
- Evren Göknar – 2017 remastering at Capitol Mastering (Hollywood, California)
- Marc Greene – pre-production

Art

- Gabrielle Raumberger – art direction, design
- Lyn Bradley – design
- Dennis Keeley and Michael Lavine – photography
- Matthew Nelson, Gunnar Nelson, and Diane Estelle – clothing image concept
- Diane Estelle – clothes design
- Gail Ananighian and Marie Blom – assistants
- Kohlene Hendrickson – symbology

== Charts ==
Chart (1990–1991)	Peak position
Australian Albums (ARIA)	100
Canada Top Albums/CDs (RPM)	40
Swedish Albums (Sverigetopplistan)	47
US Billboard 200	17

== Certifications ==
Region	Certification	Certified units/sales
Canada (Music Canada)	Platinum	100,000^{^}
United States (RIAA)	2× Platinum	2,000,000^{^}
^{^} Shipments figures based on certification alone.

== Citations ==
- "Nelson | Biography & History". AllMusic. "Nelson made their debut in 1990 with the release of After the Rain. Filled with polished, radio-friendly pop-metal, the album was a major hit in America."
- After the Rain - AllMusic, "Led by brothers Matthew & Gunnar Nelson, Nelson brought Rick Nelson's sons a lot of exposure in the early 1990s. Like that celebrated '50s icon, Matthew and Gunnar went for a polished, boy-next-door image -- wholesome sex symbols, if you will -- but their music didn't sound anything like their father. Instead, this debut album boasted a glossy, '80s-sounding blend of corporate rock and arena rock (sort of White Lion meets Loverboy meets Bon Jovi, minus the "bad boy" element). Rock critics tend to deplore and rail against albums like After the Rain, but say what you will -- "I Can Hardly Wait," "Fill You Up," the chart-topping "(Can't Live Without Your) Love and Affection" and other melodic tunes are both catchy and likable. Granted, this type of pop/rock can easily become bloodless and mechanical, but the Nelson siblings come across as sincere. For all its slickness, After the Rain has heart."
- "Matthew & Gunnar Nelson Reflect on 'After the Rain' at 30: 'Love & Affection' 'Wasn't Even Going to Make the Album'". Billboard. "Their debut record, a catchy hybrid of power-pop and hard rock."
- "RIP..Former Nelson guitarist Joey Cathcart loses battle with Brain Cancer".Metal Sludge. Retrieved 2021-05-03.

== Sources ==
- Elliott, Paul (January 19, 1991). "Rights of Passage" (PDF). Sounds. Peterborough: United Newspapers. p. 20. Archived from the original (PDF) on June 22, 2022 – via World Radio History.
