= Power Tool =

Power Tool may refer to:

- Power tool
- an early name of the band Nelson
