= (Can't Live Without Your) Love and Affection =

1990 single by Nelson

Single by Nelson

from the album After the Rain
- B-side: "Will You Love Me"
- Released: June 15, 1990
- Genre: Power pop; glam metal
- Length: 3:55
- Label: DGC
- Songwriters: Matthew Nelson; Gunnar Nelson; Marc Tanner
- Producers: Marc Tanner; David Thoener

Nelson singles chronology
"(Can't Live Without Your) Love and Affection" (1990)	"After the Rain" (1990)

"(Can't Live Without Your) Love and Affection" is a song by American rock band Nelson, written by Matthew Nelson, Gunnar Nelson, and Marc Tanner. It was released in 1990 on DGC Records and backed with "Will You Love Me?". The song was based on a crush on Cindy Crawford. The music video features model and actress Judie Aronson who first appears on the cover of a magazine called "Vague", a parody of Vogue magazine.

The song topped the US Billboard Hot 100 chart on September 29, 1990, becoming the only single from the band to top the chart. This made the Nelson family the only American family to have three generations of number-one singles—the Nelson brothers are sons of musician Ricky Nelson and grandsons of bandleader Ozzie Nelson and singer Harriet Nelson.

The production on the single and its B-side, "Will You Love Me?", was done by David Thoener and Marc Tanner. It also appears as the first track on Nelson's album, After the Rain. The song is used in Beavis and Butt-Head. American boy band Natural covered the song for their 2002 album Keep It Natural.

== Charts ==
=== Weekly charts ===
Chart (1990–1991)	Peak position
Australia (ARIA)	20
Canada Top Singles (RPM)	11
New Zealand (Recorded Music NZ)	44
UK Singles (Official Charts)	54
US Billboard Hot 100	1
US Mainstream Rock Airplay (Billboard)	20
US Cash Box Top 100	1

=== Year-end charts ===
Chart (1990)	Position
Australia (ARIA)	99
Canada Top Singles (RPM)	81
US Billboard Hot 100	27
US Cash Box Top 100	2

== Certifications ==
Region	Certification	Certified units/sales
United States (RIAA)	Gold	500,000^{^}
^{^} Shipments figures based on certification alone.

== Release history ==
Region	Date	Format(s)	Label(s)	Ref.
United States	June 15, 1990	7-inch vinyl; cassette	DGC	
Australia	August 6, 1990	7-inch vinyl; cassette	DGC	
United Kingdom	September 17, 1990	7-inch vinyl; 12-inch vinyl; CD; cassette	DGC	
Australia	October 8, 1990	CD	DGC	
