= After the Rain (Nelson song) =

1990 single by Nelson

Single by Nelson

from the album After the Rain
- A-side: "After the Rain"
- B-side: "Fill You Up"
- Released: 1990
- Recorded: 1990
- Studio: Cherokee Studios
- Genre: Glam metal
- Length: 4:05
- Label: DGC
- Songwriters: Matthew & Gunnar Nelson, Tanner, Rick Wilson
- Producers: Marc Tanner, David Thoener

Nelson singles chronology
"(Can't Live Without Your) Love and Affection" (1990)	"After the Rain" (1990)	"More Than Ever" (1991)

"After the Rain" is a song by American glam metal band Nelson, released as a single in 1990.

== Critical reception ==
In review of 5 January 1991 Paul Elliott of Sounds called this song "a seemingly perfect and infallible rock single" and said that it, like "(Can't Live Without Your) Love and Affection," "is kinda sad yet still kicks ass."

== Music video ==
The song's music video was placed on Noiscreep's list of 10 Unintentionally Funny Heavy Metal Videos.

== Charts ==
Chart performance for "After the Rain"
Chart (1990–1991)	Peak position
Australia (ARIA)	75
Canada Top Singles (RPM)	6
US Billboard Hot 100	6
US Mainstream Rock (Billboard)	39
