= Big Sky (Brett Garsed album) =

Studio album by Brett Garsed
- Released: July 15, 2002
- Recorded: Cranky Boy Studios in Thousand Oaks, California
- Genres: Instrumental rock, jazz fusion
- Length: 61:22
- Label: Paranormal
- Producers: Brett Garsed, Ric Fierabracci, Grit Frederick

Brett Garsed chronology
Uncle Moe's Space Ranch (2001)	Big Sky (2002)	Dark Matter (2011)

Big Sky is the first studio album by guitarist Brett Garsed, released in 2002 through Paranormal Records. The intro of the second track, "Trinity", contains a sample from the 1952 educational film Duck and Cover.

== Track listing ==
All music is composed by Brett Garsed, except where noted.

No.	Title	Length
1.	"Undoing"	4:57
2.	"Trinity" (Garsed, John Glance)	7:26
3.	"Brothers"	5:40
4.	"Drowning"	8:08
5.	"Fu'd Fight"	5:14
6.	"Breathe"	5:05
7.	"Got the Horn"	5:55
8.	"The Myth"	4:41
9.	"Friend or Foe"	5:33
10.	"Big Sky"	8:43
Total length:		61:22

== Personnel ==
- Brett Garsed – guitar, engineering, mixing, production
- Toss Panos – drums
- Ric Fierabracci – bass, engineering, mixing, production
- Dave Schultz – mastering
- Grit Frederick – executive production
