= Rafael Moreira =

Brazilian musician (born 1974)

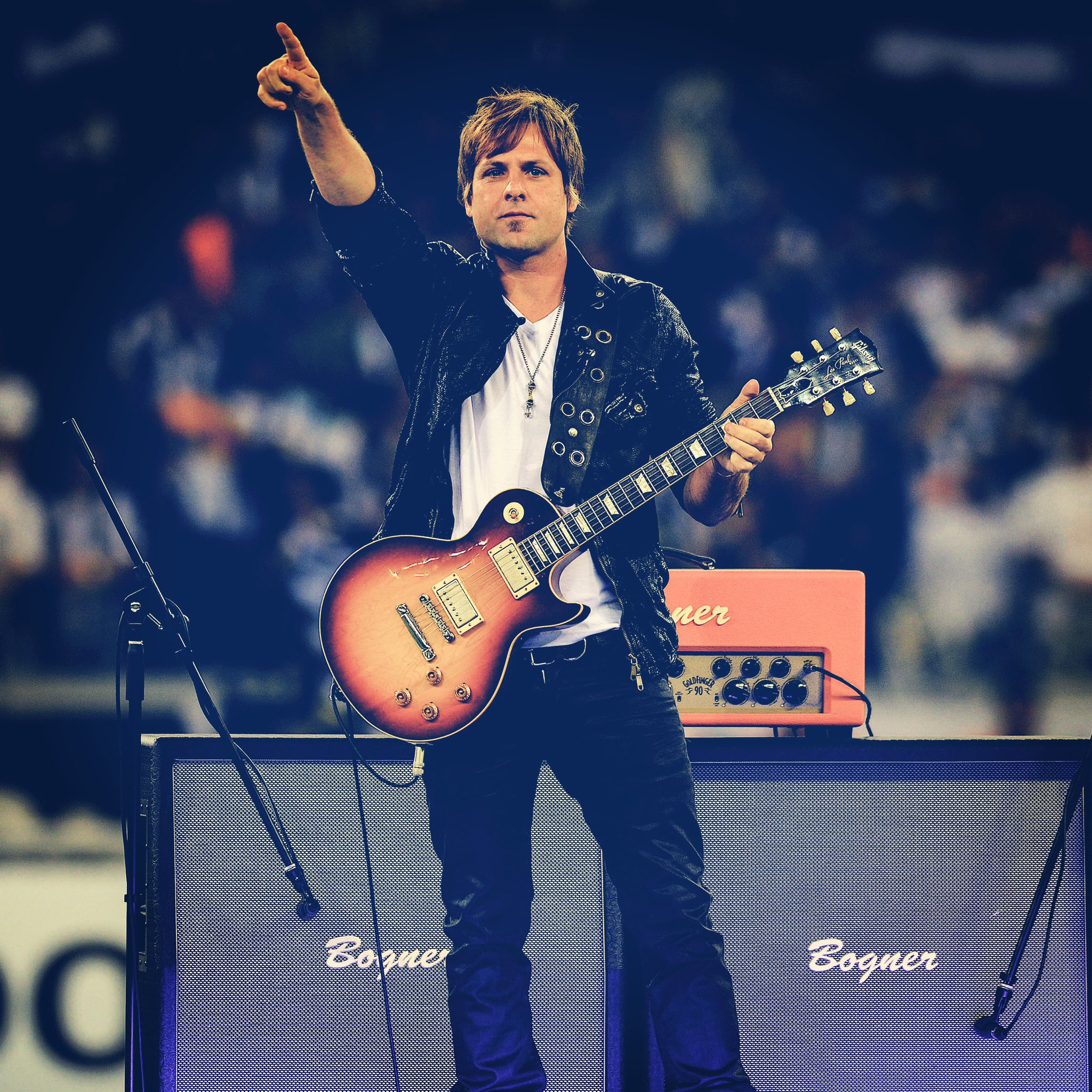
- 2013 Libertadores Cup Final

Background information
- Born: Rafael Cury Moreira; August 3, 1974; Cambará, Paraná, Brazil
- Genres: Rock, heavy metal, Brazilian music, fusion, pop, jazz
- Occupations: Guitarist, singer-songwriter, record producer
- Years active: 1980–present
- Website: www.rafaelmoreira.com

Rafael Moreira is a Brazilian-American guitarist, vocalist, songwriter and record producer, best known as the lead guitarist / vocalist on the hit CBS television shows Rock Star: INXS and Rock Star: Supernova, MTV's Rock The Cradle and most recently on NBC's The Voice. He has also appeared as lead guitarist / supporting vocalist live on world tours and television, as well as on CD & DVD releases, with world-renowned and groundbreaking artists such as Paul Stanley (KISS), Steven Tyler (Aerosmith), Dave Navarro and Stephen Perkins (Jane's Addiction), Tommy Lee (Mötley Crüe) and Natasha Bedingfield. Rafael has also performed as the lead guitarist for Grammy-winning artists Pink, Christina Aguilera, Don Felder (The Eagles) Marc Anthony, Colbie Caillat and Mýa.

In addition to these performances, Rafael's televised / feature appearances include American Idol (for "Rock Week" 2009), The American Music Awards, both the U.S. and European MTV Video Music Awards, BBC Top of the Pops, BBC Live Sessions, Saturday Night Live, Oprah, The Tonight Show with Jay Leno, Late Show with David Letterman, Late Night with Conan O'Brien, Jimmy Kimmel Live!, Good Morning America, Live with Regis and Kelly, The Ellen DeGeneres Show and a number of other major shows throughout Europe, Asia and Australia, including The Essence Awards, The ALMA Awards, The Rosie O'Donnell Show, VH-1's MTV/VH-1 Fashion Awards, Men Strike Back, Storytellers, and Divas Awards.

In 2009, Rafael was featured on the cover of the legendary publication Guitar Player Magazine online for his musical artistry and ability to unite fans around the world. In 2010, Rafael signed a publishing deal with the world's largest independent music publisher-Bug Music, home to such artists as Johnny Cash, Pete Townshend, Stevie Ray Vaughan and Kings of Leon. Bug Music now represents both Rafael's solo compositions as well as his rock band, Magnetico's catalog of songs.

== Early life ==
Born in Cambará, Paraná, in Southern Brazil, Rafael was born as the third child of four to father Benedito Moreira Jr, an agricultural engineer, and mother Marili Cury Moreira, a music teacher. It was the artistic influence of his mother, a classical/jazz pianist that fueled his earliest musical ambitions. He started singing at age two, by five he was playing guitar.

The rich musical diversity of Brazil, particularly the artistry of Djavan, Milton Nascimento and Antonio Carlos Jobim, proved an undeniable influence on Rafael's musical upbringing. At the request of her three young boys, Marili would frequently drive to the record store, only to return bearing the latest rock records—including the Rolling Stones, Kiss and Queen.

Rafael's two brothers, Benedito Moreira Neto and Leandro Cury Moreira, played drums and bass. Together, they performed with their mother in concert and theater appearances. The three siblings also formed a rock band and played outdoor shows at state fairs, honing their performance chops in front of audiences of 10,000+. Their younger sister, Mariana Cury Moreira occasionally lent her vocals to her brothers' performances. In this arena—at the age of nine—Rafael refined a ferocious, crowd-pleasing lead guitar style.

Rafael left home and moved to Curitiba, the capital of the state of Parana, to study classical music. His first band, however, was a jazz group called Lex Luthor. Next came Icarus, a melodic metal band where Rafael rejoined his brother to tour regionally to rave reviews. "Thrash Metal Jazz" was next on the agenda as a seventeen-year-old Rafael and company stirred up a smoking amalgam of rap and heavy metal in a group called Nospheratu. The band's EP was an underground indie hit.

== Rock Star House Band ==
The Rock Star House Band was formed in 2005 for the CBS reality TV series Rock Star: INXS. On becoming a member of the House Band ... "After being on the road with Pink throughout Europe for almost a year and a half, I got an email from Paul Mirkovich (House Band musical director) saying that he saw me playing with Pink and that he thought I was terrific (nice compliment!!) and wanted to know if I would be interested in auditioning with him for the Rock Star: INXS TV show and my reply was "lets do it!" At the auditions we got to play Bohemian Rhapsody (Queen), Need you Tonight (INXS) and Suffragette City (David Bowie) and when we finished playing, there was excitement in the room and chemistry on the stage!! Sasha also auditioned on bass with Paul and I. To complete the house band, the producers of the show ended up choosing drummer Nate Morton and rhythm guitar player Jim McGorman who were also auditioning with their own bands." The members of the House Band reunited in July 2006 for Rock Star: Supernova (season 2 of the CBS reality TV series Rock Star).

== Magnetico ==
In addition to his solo career, Rafael records and tours with his band, Magnetico. Joining Rafael on Magnetico's debut release "Songs About The World" are Corey McCormick on Bass and Backing Vocals and Joey K. on Drums and Backing Vocals. Bass Player, arranger, Singer-Songwriter Corey McCormick has been performing with legendary singer Chris Cornell, Vertical Horizon and The Big Pill. Drummer, Singer-Songwriter and Producer Joey K. has performed with Pink, Ozomatli, and The Big Pill.

Magnetico has performed around the world in countries such as Switzerland, Austria, Germany and Singapore. The band has also done numerous charity events in support of diabetes ('Rock Against Diabetes' alongside fellow rockers L.A. Guns) and cancer research ('Jimmy V. Foundation for Cancer Research').

In December 2009, Music Connection Magazine named Magnetico as one of the 'Top 100 Unsigned Bands of the Year'.

"Magnetico is a rock power trio and we always make sure the songs come first, but as you mentioned, we like stretching ourselves musically, either with really heavy grooves or free form solos. As for the writing, I basically write all of the music. I write most of the lyrics myself and collaborate with friends on others."

== Solo career ==
Rafael released an instrumental album in 2005. "Acid Guitar" features Joey K. on Drums, Corey McCormick on Bass and other guests. The album is a blend of Jazz/Rock with Brazilian undertones-peppered with a ton of shredding guitar solos. Produced by Rafael Moreira and mixed by Grammy and Latin Grammy Award winner Antonio "Moogie" Canazio. You can listen to the tracks or buy the CD at CD Baby: Rafael Moreira. Rafael was also invited to record on the debut project for the group Shapes, produced by Jimmy Haslip, where he performed with two legendary Brazilian artists: drummer Airto Moreira and singer Flora Purim.

Rafael's guitar talents are often seen at the Baked Potato night club in Los Angeles with his current band.

== Notable accomplishments ==
- Guitarist on Paul Stanley's "One Live Kiss" (DVD, 2008) ASIN: B001G7FTB6
- Guitarist on Pink's "Live in Europe" (DVD, 2006) ASIN: B00067BBQO
- Guitarist on Christina Aguilera's "My Reflections" (DVD, 2000) ASIN: B00005IA82
- Performed with Christina Aguilera's at Saturday Night Live 2000 - "Season 25 | Episode 16 Christopher Walken/Christina Aguilera"
- Winner of GIT (Guitar Institute of Technology) Masters Guitar Competition while at Musicians Institute.
- Guitarist on Pink's "I'm Not Dead" (CD, 2006) ASIN: B000EGCITQ
- Guitarist on Koshi Inaba's solo record "Hadou" (CD, 2010) ASIN: B0042RJU6M
- Guitarist on Vasco Rossi's "Il Mondo Che Vorrei" (CD, 2009) ASIN: B00153ZQF0
- Guitarist on Marco Mendoza's "Casa Mendoza" (CD, 2010) ASIN: B003VCIRUO
- Performed with Natasha Bedingfield at VH1's 2010 "Do Something Awards" and The Ellen DeGeneres Show
- Touring guitarist for Utada's "In The Flesh" 2010 US tour and performed with her on The CBS Early Show as well as KTLA Morning News.

== Miscellaneous notes ==
1. Rafael was featured on the October 2009 cover of Guitar Player Magazine online.
2. The audition for Pink actually called for a female guitar player. When Rafael was asked to audition he was the only male there.
3. Rafael – along with Joe Satriani, Steve Lukather, Richie Kotzen and others – was a judge at the Guitar Player magazine's "Guitar Hero ’06" contest.
4. Rafael appeared on the American Idol 09' and played lead guitar for 'Rock week'
5. Rafael appeared in Vasco Rossi's music video for 'Il Mondo Che Vorrei'
6. Rafael wrote and produced a track for Swiss-Italian artist Scilla Siekmann and first season Rockstar: INXS contestant Ty Taylor
7. In 2009, Rafael co-wrote a track recorded especially for the CBS show Cold Case

== Education ==
Rafael attended the Musicians Institute in Hollywood, California (1995–1998).
Graduating in 1996, Rafael was awarded a scholarship to continue his studies.

== Discography ==
Rafael Moreira – Acid Guitar (2005) ASIN: B000GW8PLI

1. Basically Lost (Sentado, Sozinho, Sem Caminho)
2. Paria
3. Deep Space Funk
4. When the Samba Disappears
5. Pornomovie (Um Filme De Sacanagem)
6. Slow Burn
7. Spring Hell
8. Miracle Road

Magnetico – Songs About the World (2009) ASIN: B0026RB3YW

1. The Emperor
2. Invisible
3. Nothingness
4. Indigenous (Radio Edit)
5. Avalanche
6. Psychological Control
7. Letter For A Friend
8. Killer Girl
9. Soldiers of God
10. Santa Claus Is A Lie
11. Dance Song
12. Will You Go

Magnetico – Death Race (2016) ASIN: B01N0AQM64

1. Death Race
2. Lady Friend of Mine
3. Hunter
4. Beautiful Memories
5. Awaken
6. Sevenfold
7. Ordinary People
