= Dark Matter (Brett Garsed album) =

Studio album by Brett Garsed
- Released: 29 June 2011
- Recorded: Cranky Boy Studios in Thousand Oaks, California
- Genres: Instrumental rock, jazz fusion
- Length: 60:28
- Producers: Brett Garsed, Ric Fierabracci

Brett Garsed chronology
Big Sky (2002)	Dark Matter (2011)

Dark Matter is the second studio album by guitarist Brett Garsed, released independently on 29 June 2011. It was first made available as a digital download on iTunes and CD Baby, followed by a CD release on Garsed's official website.

== Track listing ==
All tracks are written by Brett Garsed.

No.	Title	Length
1.	"Dark Matter"	7:02
2.	"Android"	5:47
3.	"If Only"	5:45
4.	"Avoid the Void"	6:28
5.	"James Bong (License to Chill)"	8:04
6.	"Closure"	5:54
7.	"Poison Dwarf"	5:54
8.	"Be Here Now"	4:50
9.	"Enigma"	10:44
Total length:		60:28

Japanese edition bonus track
No.	Title	Length
10.	"G Force Blues"	3:18

== Personnel ==
- Brett Garsed – guitar, mixing, producer
- Gerry Pantazis – drums (except track 1)
- Virgil Donati – drums (track 1)
- Ric Fierabracci – bass, mixing, producer
- Craig Newman – bass (track 9)
