= Nelson (duo) =

American rock band

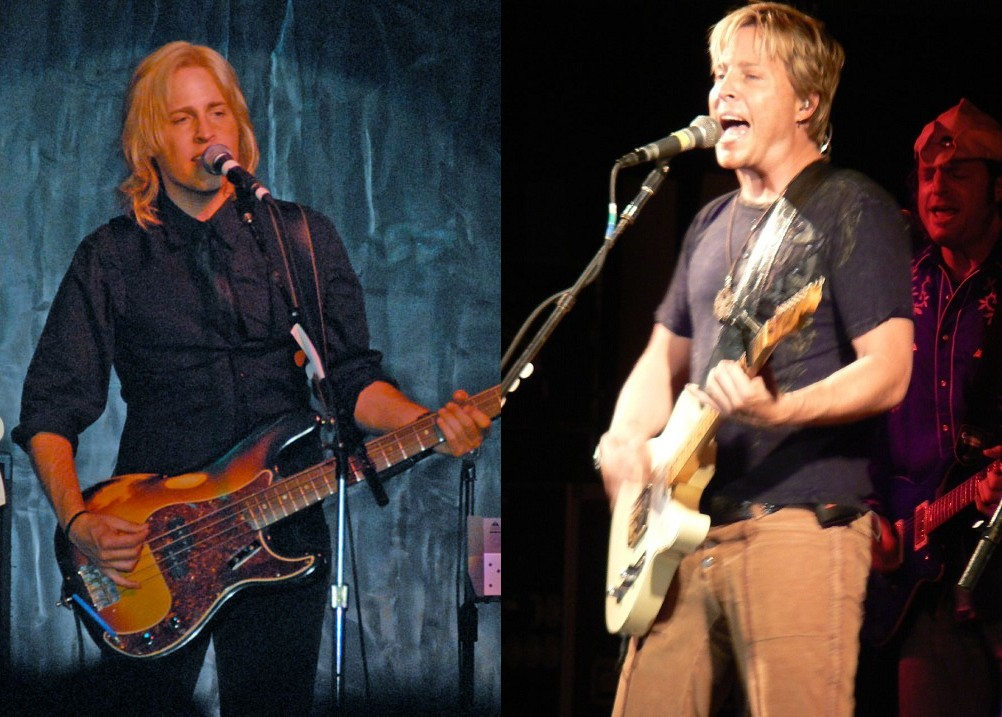
- Matthew Nelson (left) and Gunnar Nelson

Background information
- Origin: Santa Monica, California, U.S.
- Genres: Glam metal, hard rock, pop rock
- Years active: 1986–present
- Labels: DGC, Victor, Fuel 2000, Perris, Stone Canyon, Frontiers
- Members: Matthew Nelson; Gunnar Nelson
- Past members: Brett Garsed; Joey Cathcart; Paul Mirkovich; Bobby Rock
- Website: nelsontwins.com

Nelson is an American rock duo consisting of brothers Matthew and Gunnar Nelson. They are the twin sons of Rick Nelson and Kristin Nelson. The duo achieved success during the early 1990s with their debut album After the Rain, which included "(Can't Live Without Your) Love and Affection".

After the success of their first album, Nelson claimed they experienced conflicts with their record label, lack of support from the media, and the shift in music towards grunge and alternative rock. They eventually split with Geffen Records in 1995. Despite this, the duo has continued to produce and release albums independently under their own label, Stone Canyon Records.

Matthew and Gunnar also perform under the name of Ricky Nelson Remembered, as a tribute to their father. They are listed in the Guinness Book of World Records as the only family to reach number one record status in three successive generations (beginning with grandparents Ozzie and Harriet Nelson).

== History ==
=== Early years ===
Born on September 20, 1967, Matthew and Gunnar Nelson are the twin sons of Rick Nelson and Kristin Nelson, and were involved in music from an early age. In an interview, Gunnar once said that he and Matthew had been writing songs since they were six years old.

During the 1980s, Matthew and Gunnar played as Strange Agents and as The Nelsons, with which they played the Los Angeles club scene. A year after the death of their father in a plane crash, Lorne Michaels agreed to have the Nelsons as a musical guest on Saturday Night Live, at the request of their manager at the time. They became the first unsigned band to play on the show. During this iteration of the band, Matthew was the lead singer and bassist, while Gunnar played the drums. As they returned home from the show, Gunnar claims he had what he called "an epiphany", which he shared with his brother. He told him that they should break up the band as it was and start sharing the front stage together. Gunnar promised to learn to play guitar and did so in a year.

As the band tried to find a record deal, they settled with Geffen Records and began approaching A&R executive John Kalodner. According to Gunnar, they met with Kalodner "every month for a year", during which he filtered the songs they brought him until they had enough for an album. They were also introduced to Marc Tanner, who helped them polish their songwriting skills.

During this time, Nelson was also approached to contribute a song to the film Bill & Ted's Excellent Adventure. Matthew and Gunnar then co-wrote a song with Dweezil Zappa called "Two Heads are Better than One". Since the band was in the process of being signed up to Geffen, Kalodner recommended them not to use their names for the song, so they were billed as Power Tool instead. The song eventually became the film's theme song.

=== Record deal and success with After the Rain ===
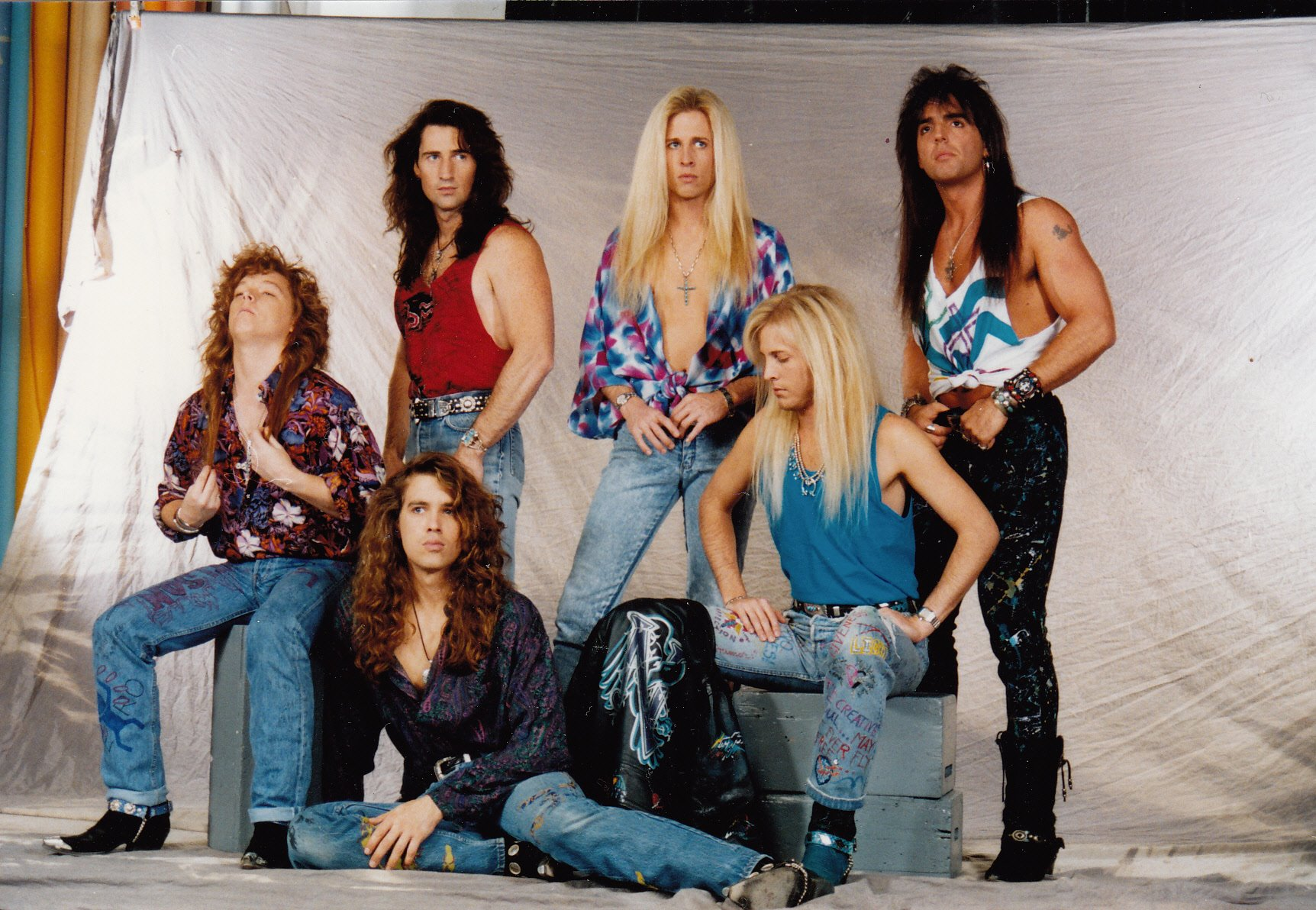
Nelson in 1991

After a year of meeting with Kalodner without being signed, Matthew and Gunnar met with him, against the wishes of their managers, and played an acoustic version of "(Can't Live Without Your) Love and Affection". Kalodner was impressed and the band was signed the next day.

As the Nelsons prepared to go into the studio, they started assembling a band. They met drummer Bobby Rock at the MTV Music Awards, when he was still with Vinnie Vincent Invasion, and kept in touch. After that band broke up, Nelson asked him to join their band. Joey Cathcart had played guitar with the brothers in high school so they decided to approach him. They were introduced to guitarist Brett Garsed by their manager in Australia. Finally, they contacted Paul Mirkovich, who had worked with them during the demo sessions for the album.

The full band headed to the studio where they worked with Marc Tanner. According to the Nelsons, John Kalodner "basically let us do our own thing". After the Rain was released on June 26, 1990, and became an instant success. The album ended up selling more than 3,000,000 copies, eventually being certified double platinum by RIAA. As a result, the band began a World Tour with over 300 concerts. Their first single, "(Can't Live Without Your) Love and Affection" peaked at number 1 on Billboard's Hot 100. Their other songs "After the Rain", "More than Ever", and "Only Time Will Tell" peaked at number 6, number 14, and number 28 respectively. The band started with a headlining club tour before heading out in April/May opening arenas for Cinderella & Lynch Mob. The brothers then finished the summer headlining their own tour with support from Tyketto & Enuff Z'Nuff.

They performed "(Can't Live Without Your) Love and Affection" on the inaugural Billboard Music Awards as it was the number 1 song on the Hot 100 the week of the show. The show's producer, Paul Flattery, and director, Jim Yukich, had also made the music video for the song.

=== Struggles with Geffen and Imaginator ===
After several years of touring, the band went into the studio to record their follow-up. The result of this was a darker and harder concept album titled Imaginator. According to Gunnar "it was about the machine that is the media. That same machine that built us up and was also so ready to tear us down." According to the band, producer John Kalodner was not involved with the recording process because he "was too busy making Aerosmith records". When they presented the album to the executives at Geffen Records, they were not pleased and gave the band the choice to either produce and record another album, more according to what they were expecting, or they would be released from their contract.

I'm proud of that record [Because They Can]. I think it's a great record for what it is. But I was given the mandate by John Kalodner, "You're not allowed to play any crunchy guitar on this record at all. It's got to be acoustic and organic, and that's it!"

— Gunnar Nelson (guitarist/singer)

Gunnar has said that they left "frustrated and helpless", but decided to return to the studio. They began working on a more acoustic-oriented album, which was, according to Gunnar, "180 degrees in the opposite direction of Imaginator". The result was the album Because They Can, which ended up being released in 1995, five years after their first album. Kalodner left Geffen a week before the release of the album, and the label decided to give the album limited promotion.

Shortly after, Geffen released Nelson from their contract. Gunnar refers to this as "one of the best days of my life." Shortly after leaving Geffen, Nelson finally released Imaginator through Victor Entertainment. The band considers the album a representation of their live sound at that time.

=== Independent releases ===
The band then established their own record label, Stone Canyon Records, though they continued to license their albums in Japan through Victor. In 1997, they released their first album under their own label, titled The Silence is Broken. The Nelsons consider it an "experiment" and a "transitional" album.

In 1998, Matthew and Gunnar started compiling a collection of demos with the purpose of doing a joint venture deal in Nashville. The result became a country album, Brother Harmony, in which they are billed as The Nelsons, which was later released in 2000. The next year, they released Life, which was their final album with Victor. Gunnar has referred to this album in interviews as a "take no prisoners pop/rock album".

Matthew and Gunnar followed this with a tribute album to their father, Rick Nelson. The album, titled Like Father, Like Sons, was released in 2000.

In 2003, Gunnar Nelson composed and performed "Team Chaotix", the main theme of the Chaotix team, along with Crush 40's guitarist Jun Senoue, in the video game Sonic Heroes. In 2004, the brothers went out on the road for the summer opening for Styx and Peter Frampton in arenas.

=== Later years ===
In 2010, Nelson reached a record deal with Frontiers Records. They released three albums almost consecutively. The first, Before the Rain, is a collection of demos made during the After the Rain sessions. The second one is Perfect Storm, which is a compilation of live recordings from the After the Rain world tour. This is notable because, despite being such a massive world tour that covered almost 300 dates across the world, no official recording was made of it. The third album was a new studio album called Lightning Strikes Twice (2010), which features new material from the band. It is the first original studio album from the band since Life was released in 1999.

The release of the three albums in 2010 coincided with the band's official anniversary. For it, they organized a 20th Anniversary Tour around several countries. Singer/guitarist Mark Slaughter joined Nelson for the tour, which began at the Firefest in Nottingham, England.

In addition to touring as Nelson, the twin singer-songwriters also perform a separate tribute act for their father, called Ricky Nelson Remembered. Additionally, they perform with celebrity all-star rock band Scrap Metal.

In 2015, the band released their final album with Frontiers, Peace Out. That same year, the brothers released a Christmas album titled This Christmas; it was followed up with a deluxe edition the following year titled This Christmas Too.

In 2025, the band was featured in the finale of season 2 of Peacemaker, playing their song "To Get Back to You". They also released their autobiography 'What Happened To Your Hair?!' in December of that year.

In April 2026, Nelson announced a return to Frontiers Records after a decade hiatus from rock music. A new comeback album is currently in the works; it is their first rock album since 2015 with a full band. They are also expected to make a full band appearance at the next Frontiers Rock Festival, which is due to take place on May 3, 2026, in Italy.

== Band members ==
Current members

- Matthew Nelson – lead vocals, bass, guitars
- Gunnar Nelson – lead vocals, guitars, drums, keyboards

Former members

- Brett Garsed – guitars, backing vocals
- Joey Cathcart – guitars, backing vocals (died: 2021)
- Paul Mirkovich – keyboards, backing vocals
- Bobby Rock – drums

== Discography ==
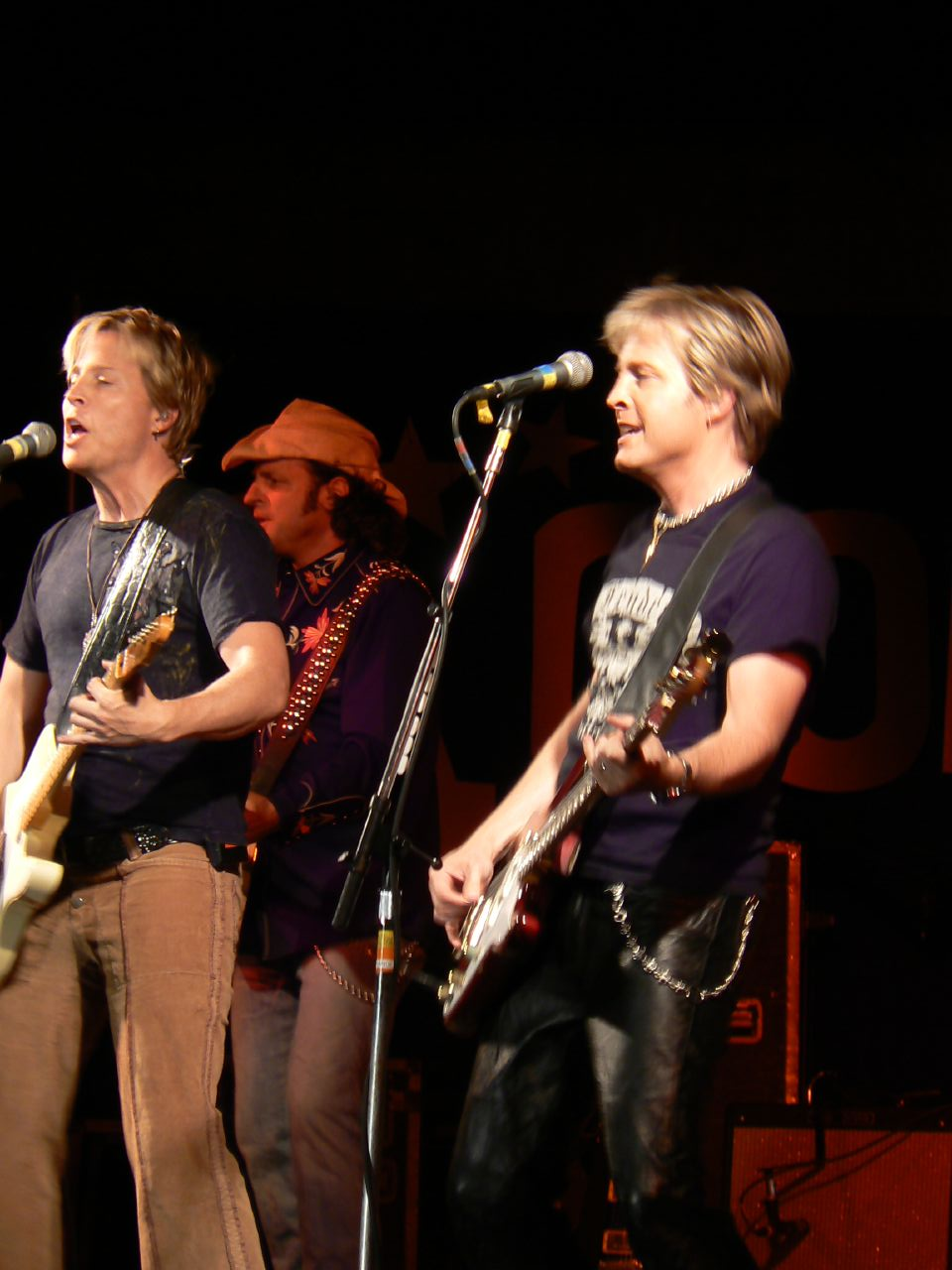
Nelson in 2007

=== Albums ===
- After the Rain (1990) No. 17 US – RIAA: Double Platinum, AUS No. 100
- Because They Can (1995)
- Imaginator (1996; recorded 1992)
- The Silence Is Broken (1997)
- Life (1999)
- Lightning Strikes Twice (2010)
- Peace Out (2015)

=== Other releases ===
==== as The Nelsons ====
- Brother Harmony (2000)

==== as Matthew & Gunnar Nelson ====
- Like Father, Like Sons (2000)
- This Christmas (2015)
- This Christmas Too (2016)

=== Compilations ===
- 20th Century Masters – The Millennium Collection: The Best of Nelson (2004)
- Before the Rain: The Demos 1986-1990 (2010)
- Greatest Hits (And Near Misses) (2022)

=== Live albums ===
- Perfect Storm – After the Rain World Tour 1991 (2010)

=== Singles ===
Year	Song	US	US Rock	CAN	AUS	NZ	UK	Album
1990	"(Can't Live Without Your) Love and Affection"	1	20	11	20	44	54	After the Rain
1990	"After the Rain"	6	39	6	75	—	—	After the Rain
1991	"More Than Ever"	14	44	30	191	—	—	After the Rain
1991	"Only Time Will Tell"	28	—	81	124	—	—	After the Rain
1995	"(You Got Me) All Shook Up"	104	—	—	—	—	—	Because They Can
1995	"Cross My Broken Heart"	—	—	—	—	—	—	Because They Can
1995	"Won't Walk Away"	—	—	—	—	—	—	Because They Can

=== Guest singles ===
Year	Song	Artist	US Hot 100	US AC	Can RPM 100	Album
1991	"Voices That Care"	Various artists	11	6	61	single only

== Music videos ==
Year	Video	Director
1991	"Voices That Care" (Various Artists)	Jim Yukich
