= Brett Garsed =

Australian guitarist (born 1963)

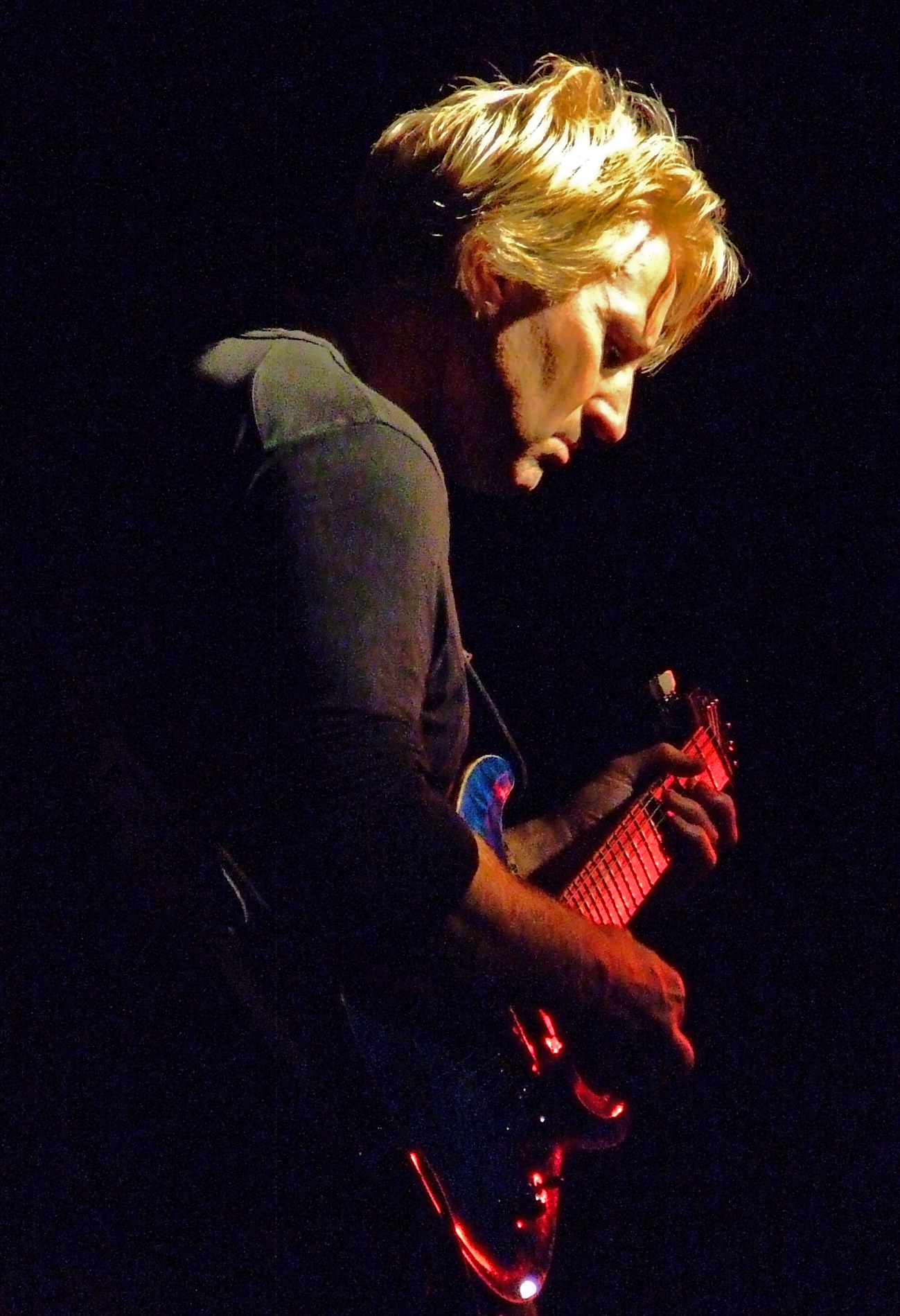
- Garsed in 2007

Background information
- Also known as: Rambo (nickname)
- Born: Brett Edward Garsed; 20 April 1963 (age 63); Victoria, Australia
- Genres: Hard rock; pop rock; glam metal; jazz fusion; instrumental rock; heavy metal; progressive metal
- Occupations: Musician, songwriter
- Instrument: Guitar
- Years active: 1980–present
- Website: brettgarsed.com

Brett Edward Garsed (born 20 April 1963) is an Australian guitarist, best known for his work as a guitarist with John Farnham and T. J. Helmerich, as well as being a former member of the rock band Nelson. He was featured on Derek Sherinian's solo records Planet X (1999) and Planet X's Quantum (2007), and more recently Sherinian's Molecular Heinosity (2010).

== Career ==
=== Early life ===
Garsed was born in rural Victoria, Australia, and began playing guitar at age 12 after hearing Deep Purple's Ritchie Blackmore play "Speed King". After about a month of initial lessons, he continued to teach himself and formed a band composed of his two cousins and a mutual friend and began playing live.

=== 1980s and 1990s ===
In July 1985, Garsed was featured in Guitar Player magazine’s "Spotlight" column, which was devoted to exposing new talent to the rest of the world. This encouraged Garsed to give up his job as a licensed plumber and pursue a career as a professional musician, prompting him to send demo tapes to as many record companies and management companies as he could find. "I wasn’t looking for a record deal. I just wanted to get into a good band." One of the tapes was heard by Ross Fraser of the Wheatley Organization, which led to an audition for a short tour by Australian superstar John Farnham. Farnham, at this time still a member of the Little River Band, was planning a solo album and invited him to be a part of the project. The resulting album, Whispering Jack, went on to become the biggest selling album in Australian history, followed by sellout tours of Australia and Europe.

Garsed continued to tour and record with Farnham until early 1989, when he was invited to the US to audition for Nelson, a band led by Gunnar and Matthew, sons of the late Ricky Nelson. The audition was a success and the resulting album, After the Rain, went on to sell in excess of three million copies and yielded a national No. 1 ('Love and Affection') as well as two Top Ten follow-up singles. In early 1990, Garsed also recorded Centrifugal Funk for Mark Varney's label Legato Records, an intense guitar album featuring Frank Gambale and Shawn Lane.

For most of 1991 Garsed toured the US with Nelson, and spent ‘92 recording Quid Pro Quo with Chicago-born guitarist T J Helmerich after the duo decided to sign to Varney’s label. With Nelson on a seemingly permanent hiatus, Garsed and TJ pursued their career promoting Quid Pro Quo, which featured Bobby Rock on drums, Gary Willis on bass and Paul Mirkovich on keys. Greeted with critical acclaim worldwide, the pair recorded the follow-up album Exempt in 1993. In 1996 Bobby Rock released Out Of Body, a progressive rock album featuring Garsed on guitar.

In 1994 Garsed also filmed an instructional video for REH/Warner titled Rock Fusion which covers, in detail, his unique approach to guitar improvisation.

Garsed’s most recent recording projects include the Uncle Moe’s Space Ranch album featuring TJ Helmerich, Gary Willis, Dennis Chambers and Scott Kinsey, the Tapestry album which was released under the band name Mojo and features Ric Fierabracci on bass and Kofi Baker, son of Ginger Baker on drums, and more recently his debut solo album Big Sky with Fierabracci returning for bass and production duties and Toss Panos behind the drums.

=== 2000s ===
Garsed returned to Australia after 14 years in Los Angeles and completed the seven-month-long "Last Time" tour with John Farnham. His first solo album, Big Sky, was released in 2002. After nearly a decade, he followed this up with Dark Matter in 2011. In 2004, Rock Guitar Improvisation, his second instructional DVD was released covering many aspects of his technique. This DVD also included some live footage.

In 2007, Garsed toured with Paul Stanley on his Live to Win tour. Garsed played rhythm guitar and provided backing vocals.

In 2011, Garsed took part in the John Farnham "Whispering Jack - 25th Anniversary" tour around Australia, revisiting the parts he created on Australia's highest selling locally made album. Garsed also released his solo album Dark Matter in 2011.

== Influences and style ==
Garsed is mainly an improvisational guitarist, renowned for his legato and hybrid picking technique, a combination that provides him with an extremely fluid sound to his playing. He has also mastered a distinctive slide guitar sound, specially noticeable in his latest releases.

Rather than relying on scale patterns and figures, he plays with a relative pitch approach, which allows him to play the melodies in his mind. A fundamental component of his music is the use of wide intervals and chromatic passing tones.

His early influences were Ritchie Blackmore, Jeff Beck, Jimmy Page, David Gilmour and Jimi Hendrix. This later expanded to more diverse styles such as Leo Kottke, Allan Holdsworth, Rory Gallagher, Scott Henderson, and Edward Van Halen.

== Discography ==
=== Solo ===
- Big Sky (2002)
- Dark Matter (2011)

=== Adrian's Wall ===
- "Caught In The Web"

=== John Farnham ===
- Whispering Jack
- Age of Reason
- Chain Reaction
- Full House
- Romeo's Heart
- John Farnham & Tom Jones - Together In Concert
- I Remember When I Was Young
- The Acoustic Chapel Sessions

=== Nelson ===
- After the Rain
- Because They Can
- Imaginator
- Perfect Storm - After The Rain World Tour 1991

=== Garsed/Helmerich ===
- Quid Pro Quo
- Exempt
- Under the Lash of Gravity
- Uncle Moe's Space Ranch
- Uncle Moe's Space Ranch, Moe's Town
- Inedits

=== Derek Sherinian/Planet X ===
- Planet X
- Quantum
- Molecular Heinosity

=== The Mark Varney Project ===
- Centrifugal Funk

=== Other appearances ===
- The Alchemists (various artists), 2002, Liquid Note Records
- Richard Hallebeek Project, with Shawn Lane, 2004, Liquid Note Records
- Progasaurus, with Chris Buck, 2008, Early Boy Records
- The World's Greatest Fusion Guitarists, with Shawn Lane, 2009, Tone Centre
- Gianluca Russo - Sedecim (2005, 2021 - Prosonic Records)
- The Feckers - Courage Of Conviction Part II: Live And Learn (2026 - The Feckers Productions)
- The Feckers - Courage Of Conviction Part III: In The Face Of Adversity (2028 - The Feckers Productions)

=== Bobby Rock ===
- Out Of Body

== Instructional videos ==
- Rock Fusion
- Rock Guitar Improvisation
