= Dark matter (economics) =

Dark matter is a term coined by Federico Sturzenegger and Ricardo Hausmann to refer to the 'invisible' assets that explain the difference between official estimates of the U.S. current account, and estimates based on the actual return on the U.S. net financial position. Specifically, the U.S. Bureau of Economic Analysis (BEA) estimated the net U.S. current account deficit to be 2.5 trillion in 2004. However, according to Sturzenegger and his colleague Ricardo Hausmann, the U.S. current account deficit cannot in reality be as high as it is estimated to be: otherwise, the U.S. would be paying large amounts of interests on its debt. This does not seem to be the case: net income in 2004 was still a positive 30 billion, which is not lower than it was in 1980, before the U.S. built up its current account deficit. Thus, the authors argue that the "real" cumulative current account between 1980 and 2004 had in fact been positive, and that somehow a large amount of (foreign) assets are being left out of the calculations.

The suggested source of this "missing wealth" is dark matter, resulting from the unaccounted export of ideas and other services (such as insurance or liquidity) from the U.S. to other economies. The two authors claim that the U.S. has significant exports, mainly of business know-how bundled with its Foreign direct investment, that do not show up in official trade statistics. These exports increase the real value of its foreign assets, and thus lower the real size of the deficit. Therefore, they argue, there is less reason to worry about the U.S. financial position than is usually assumed. In addition, this dark matter in the U.S. current account also has implications for the accounts of other countries, which have been inadvertently accruing liabilities by importing know-how.

The idea of dark matter has not gone without criticism. First, Willem Buiter has argued that dark matter should result in a higher rate of return on U.S. external assets than on U.S. external liabilities. However, he claims, there is no convincing evidence that this is the case. Second, the U.S. income from dark matter seems to vary enormously from year to year, even though it stems from permanent characteristics of the U.S. economy like the export of know-how. Lastly, Mathew Higgins, Thomas Klitgaard, and Cedric Tille agree with the assertion that U.S. foreign assets are currently undervalued. However, they argue that more important, U.S. foreign liabilities are overvalued. Thus, The U.S. has fewer foreign liabilities than is currently assumed; this fact (rather than dark matter) explains the unexpectedly high net income. In a 2007 article, Hausmann and Sturzenegger respond to some of these critiques, defending the existence and function of dark matter.
