= Paul Stanley =

American musician and songwriter (born 1952)

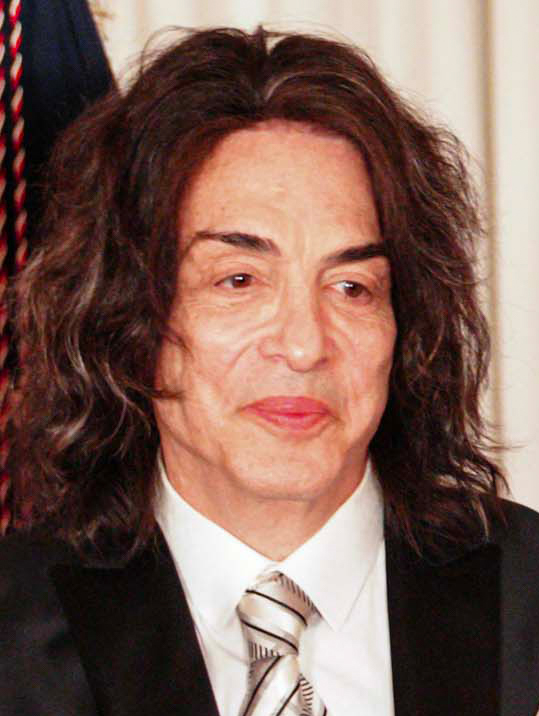
- Stanley at the Kennedy Center Honors in 2025
- Born: Stanley Bert Eisen; January 20, 1952 (age 74); New York City, U.S.
- Other name: The Starchild
- Occupations: Musician; singer; songwriter; record producer
- Years active: 1970–present
- Spouses: Pamela Bowen (m. 1992; div. 2001); Erin Sutton (m. 2005)
- Children: 4
- Musical career
- Genres: Hard rock; heavy metal
- Instruments: Vocals; guitar
- Member of: Paul Stanley's Soul Station
- Formerly of: Kiss; Wicked Lester
- Website: paulstanley.com

Paul Stanley (born Stanley Bert Eisen; January 20, 1952) is an American musician and songwriter. He was the lead vocalist, rhythm guitarist, and a founding member of the hard rock band Kiss, which was active from 1973 to 2023. He was the writer or co-writer of many of the band's most popular songs. Stanley established the Starchild character as his Kiss persona.

In 2006, Hit Parader ranked Stanley 18th on their list of the Top 100 Metal Vocalists of All Time. A Gibson.com readers' poll in 2010 named him 13th on a list of Top 25 Frontmen. He was inducted into the Rock and Roll Hall of Fame in 2014 as a member of Kiss.

== Early life and education ==
Stanley Bert Eisen was raised in the neighborhood of Inwood, Manhattan in New York City. Both his parents were Jewish. He was the younger of two children; his sister Julia is two years older. Stanley's mother, Eva Jontof-Hutter, was born in Berlin, Germany to German-Jewish parents; their family fled from Nazi Germany to Amsterdam in the Netherlands before heading to New York City. His father William Eisen's parents Rebecca and Harry Eisenhandler were both of Polish-Jewish origins. Stanley was raised Jewish, although he did not consider his family very observant and did not celebrate his bar mitzvah; he continued to consider himself Jewish in adulthood.

Since Stanley's right ear was misshapen from a birth defect called microtia and he was unable to hear on that side, he found it difficult to determine the direction of a sound, and was unable to understand speech in a noisy environment. Attending PS 98, he was taunted by other children for his deformed ear.

Despite his hearing problem, Stanley enjoyed listening to music, and he watched American Bandstand on television. His favorite musical artists included Eddie Cochran, Dion and the Belmonts, Jerry Lee Lewis, and Little Richard. Stanley learned to sing harmony with his family, and he was given a child's guitar at age seven.

Stanley's family relocated to the Kew Gardens Hills neighborhood in Queens in 1960. He listened to a lot of doo-wop music, but when the Beatles and the Rolling Stones played on U.S. television he was inspired by the performance aspect, which he thought was not out of his reach. Stanley received his first real guitar at the age of 13; an acoustic one that he would have preferred to be electric. He played tunes by Bob Dylan, the Byrds, the Lovin' Spoonful and more.

All through his childhood Stanley had been recognized for his talent in graphic arts. He attended the High School of Music & Art in New York City, graduating in 1970.

== Kiss ==
Stanley's Starchild makeup

Before Kiss, Stanley was in a local band, Rainbow, and was a member of Uncle Joe and Post War Baby Boom. Through a mutual friend of Gene Simmons, Stanley joined Simmons' band Wicked Lester in the early 1970s. The band recorded an album in 1972, but it was never officially released. Wicked Lester fell apart and Stanley and Simmons answered Peter Criss's advertisement in Rolling Stone. Soon after recruiting Criss, they held auditions for a lead guitarist, with Stanley placing an ad in the Village Voice. Ace Frehley won the group over with his playing, and was nearly a perfect fit to the group's sound. Kiss released their self-titled debut album in February 1974.

At this point, Stanley had the idea of changing his name not only for marketing purposes but also the fact he had always hated his birth name. Inspired by Paul McCartney and Paul Rodgers, he legally changed his name to Paul Stanley.

Stanley's persona in Kiss was "the Starchild" displaying one star over his right eye. For a brief time, Stanley tried out a new character "the Bandit", with a "Lone Ranger" style mask design make-up pattern. This make-up design was used during a few 1973–74 shows and photo-shoots, some of which he was photographed with both designs in the same session. "I even tried painting my face all red", he admitted. "I looked like a long-haired tomato! Before settling on the star, I'd just paint a black ring around my eye... Each of us wears something that reflects who we are. I always loved stars and always identified with them - so, when it came time to put something on my face, I knew it would be a star."

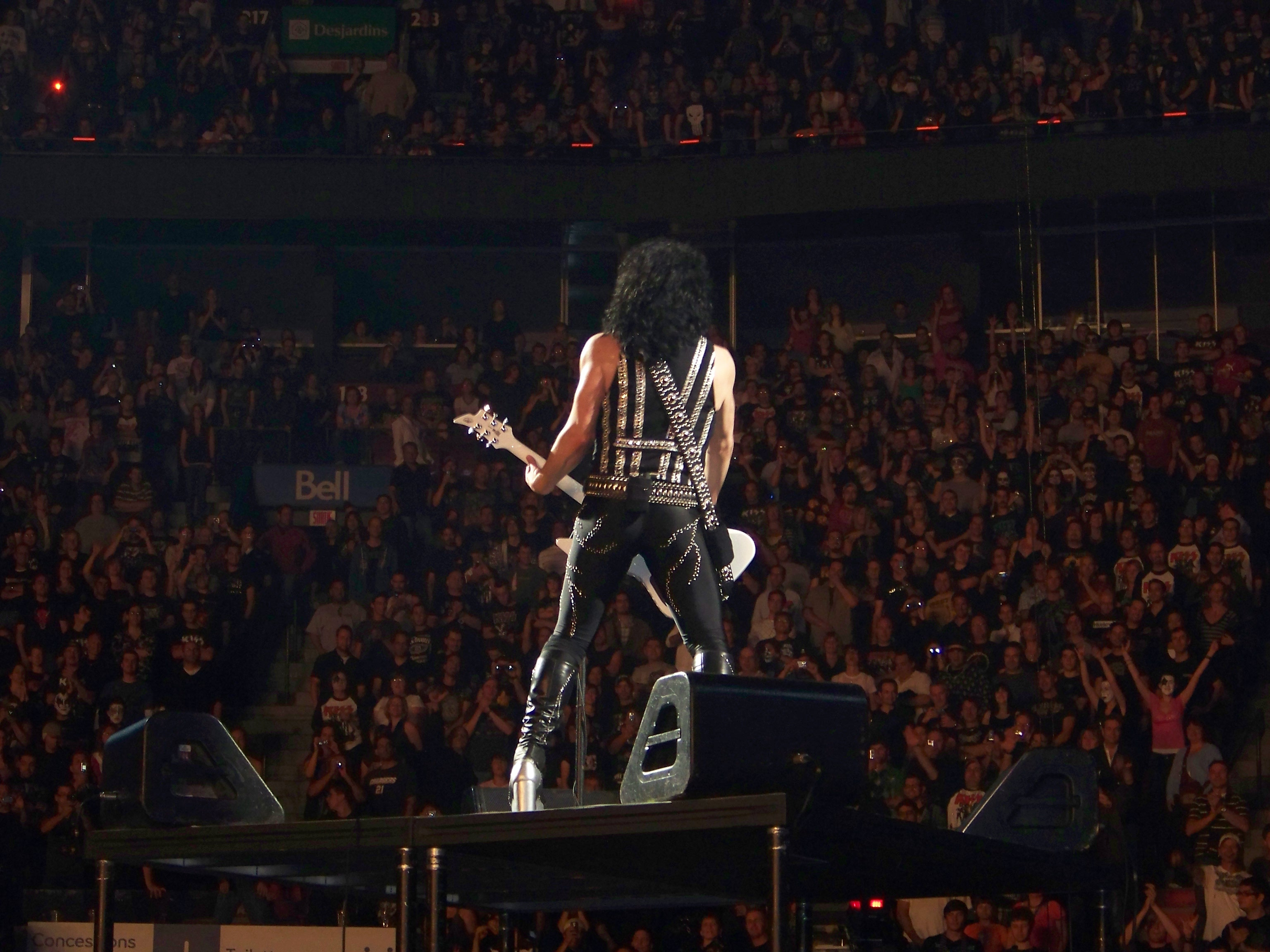
Stanley performing and singing "Love Gun" in Montreal, Quebec, August 2009

In his book Sex Money Kiss, Gene Simmons says Stanley was the driving force for Kiss during the period in the 1980s when the band performed without makeup. Those years, Stanley noted, "were fine for me. I found them very satisfying because I got a chance to be out there without makeup, which I craved at that point. I think it was easier for me [than for Simmons] because my persona was one that wasn't really defined by the makeup... The makeup was just reinforcing what you were seeing and who I was".

In 2007, Stanley was hospitalized with tachycardia. In his absence, Kiss performed live as a trio for the first time in decades. The concert was the first Kiss performance Stanley missed.

During the first leg of the band's final tour, Stanley was accused by fans of lip syncing and using backing tracks. In response to the allegations, Stanley did not confirm nor deny that he lip syncs on stage, saying he is taking care of his voice. Accusations were later revived by fans following the band's performance in Belgium on June 6, 2022, when a slip-up occurred with the fireworks and drum cues a measure late on the opening song, "Detroit Rock City". Doc McGhee, the band's manager, later confirmed simultaneously that Stanley did sing fully, but will sing to tracks, denying that he was lip-syncing.

== Solo career ==
Stanley released his first solo album Paul Stanley as part of the four simultaneously released Kiss solo albums, but he has rarely recorded or performed outside of Kiss. He wrote and recorded material for another album in 1987-88, but it was shelved in favor of the Kiss compilation Smashes, Thrashes & Hits. While never officially released, songs such as "Don't Let Go" and "When Two Hearts Collide" have circulated as bootleg recordings. One song from the project, "Time Traveler", was released as part of Kiss's 2001 box set.

In 1989, Stanley embarked on a brief club tour. His touring band included guitarist Bob Kulick and future Kiss drummer Eric Singer. In the same year, Stanley shared lead vocals with Desmond Child on the title track for the soundtrack of the Wes Craven horror film Shocker.

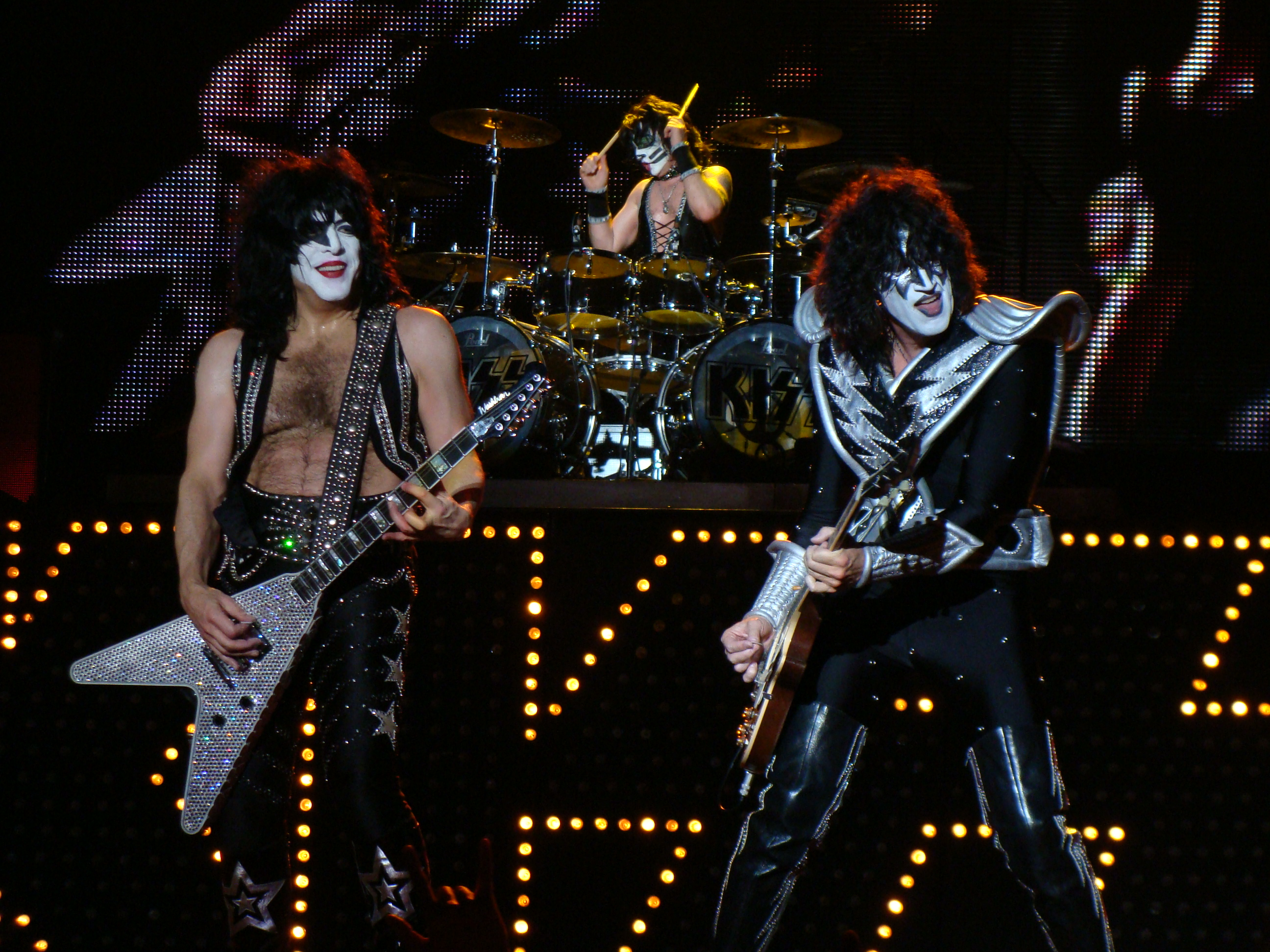
L–R: Stanley, Eric Singer and Tommy Thayer performing at the Azkena Rock Festival, June 2010

Twenty-eight years after releasing his first solo album, Stanley released a second album, Live to Win, on October 24, 2006. Its title song "Live to Win" appears in the South Park episode "Make Love, Not Warcraft". In October and November 2006, Stanley embarked on a theater tour in support of Live to Win. His touring band was the house band from the CBS TV show Rock Star, composed of Paul Mirkovich (keyboards), Jim McGorman (guitar), Rafael Moreira (lead guitar), Nate Morton (drums), and Sasha Krivtsov (bass). In April 2007, Stanley extended the tour to include Australia, playing in Coolangatta, Wollongong, Newcastle, Sydney, Melbourne, Perth and Adelaide. Portions of the tour were filmed for a documentary titled Paul Stanley: Live to dream by the Chicago-based Film Foetus. The band's performance at the House of Blues in Chicago was captured on film and released in 2008 on DVD and digital audio download formats as One Live Kiss.

In 2008, Stanley sang a duet with Sarah Brightman, "I Will Be with You", on her Symphony album. In 2016, he guested on Ace Frehley's covers album Origins, Vol. 1, singing "Fire and Water" by Free.

In 2015, Stanley established Paul Stanley's Soul Station, a tribute band playing a mix of soul oldies from the 1960s and 1970s with original songs in the same style. Paul Stanley's Soul Station released its first album in 2021, along with its lead single, the original "I, Oh I".

== Vocals and playing style ==
Possessing a tenor vocal range, Stanley tends to sing in the high registers and is known for his falsetto. Stanley uses Ibanez guitars (with various signature models currently available), Seymour Duncan pickups, Ernie Ball strings, and ENGL amplifiers, as well as custom-made Kiss signature picks. He has also used various other makes of guitar over the years, including Washburn (with which he also had a signature model), Gibson, B.C. Rich, Ampeg, and Ovation among others. He has also previously used amplifiers by Marshall, Fender and later Randall.

== Other projects ==
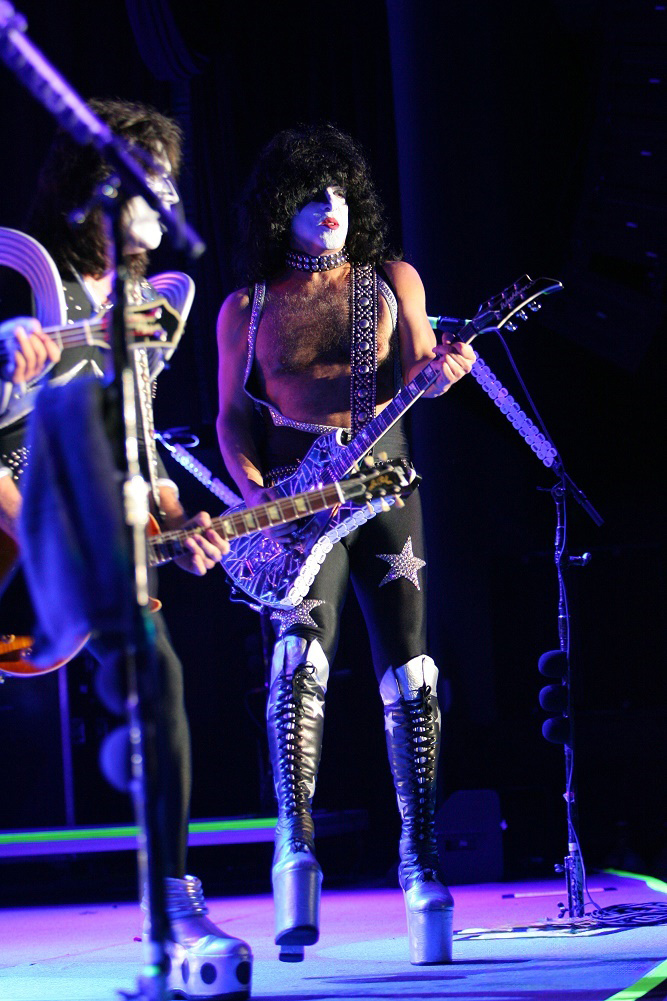
Stanley and Thayer in concert with Kiss at the Chumash Casino Resort in Santa Ynez, California in July 2006

In 1999, Stanley starred in a Toronto production of The Phantom of the Opera, in which he played the role of the Phantom. He appeared in the musical from May 25 to August 1, and again that year from September 30 to October 31, 1999, closing the show's ten-year run in Toronto. Stanley originally saw the show in London in 1987, and remarked how due to his own facial difference with microtia, he could relate to the main character on a more profound level.

Stanley made his debut as a painter in 2006, exhibiting and selling original works of art. Stanley collaborated with Boston-based power pop group Click Five on their hit single, "Angel to You (Devil to Me)".

Stanley produced a debut album for the band New England. Their first single from that album in 1978 "Don't Ever Wanna Lose Ya" reached the Top 40 in 1979.

In 2012, Stanley partnered with Gene Simmons and three other investors to form the restaurant franchise Rock & Brews.

On August 15, 2013, Stanley, Gene Simmons, and manager Doc McGhee became a part of the ownership group that created the L.A. Kiss Arena Football League team, which played their home games at the Honda Center in Anaheim, California. The team folded in 2016.

In April 2014, Stanley published his memoir, Face the Music: A Life Exposed (ISBN 978-0-06-211404-4). In the memoir, Stanley accused former bandmates Ace Frehley and Peter Criss of antisemitism.

An unreleased song written by Stanley along with Jean Beauvoir, titled "Like a Bee to the Honey", was recorded and released by the Finnish hard rock band Lordi for their album Killection.

== Personal life ==
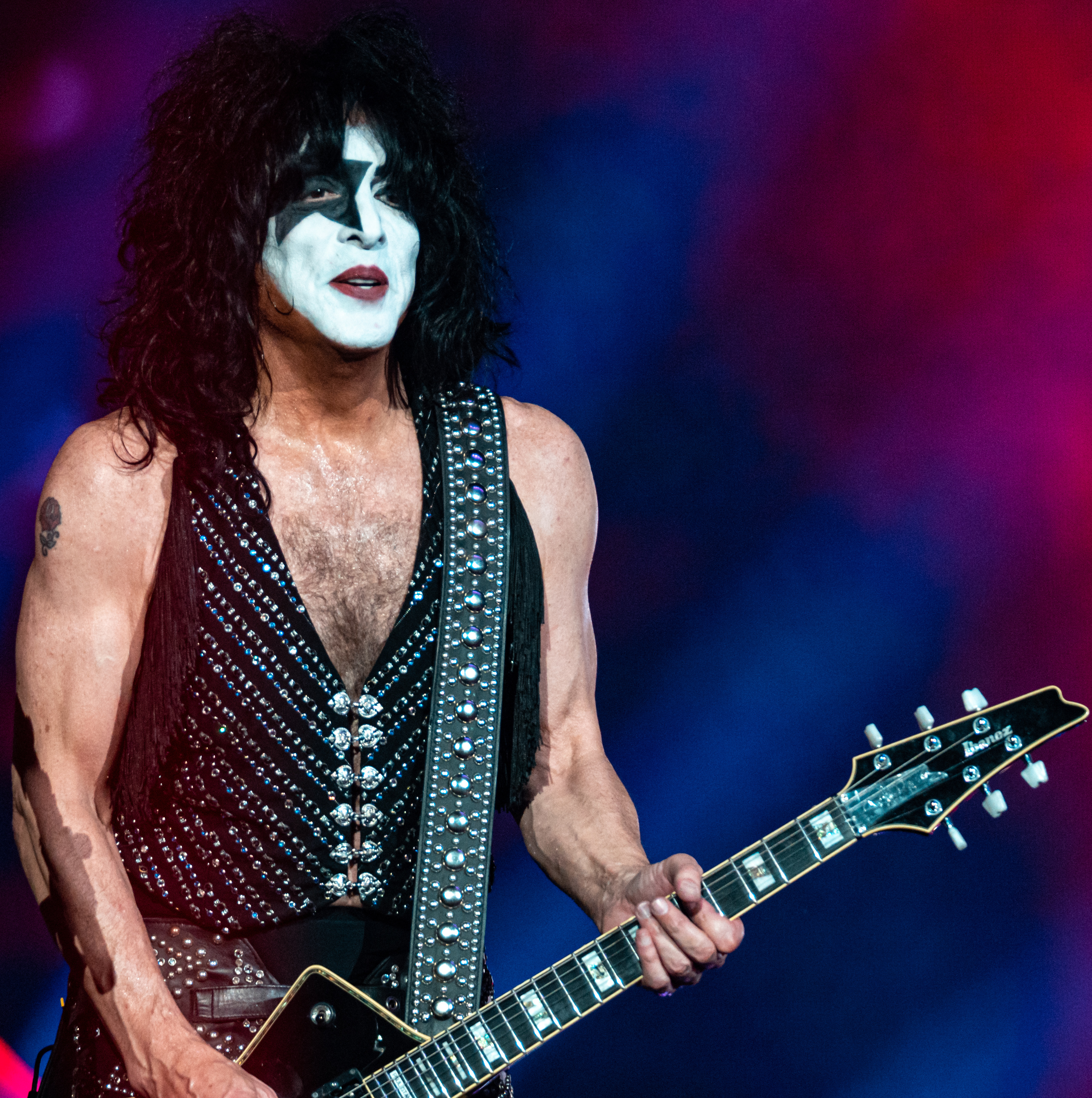
Stanley performing with Kiss at the O2 Arena in London, July 2019

In 1982, after he turned 30 years old, Stanley had reconstructive surgery for the microtia in his right ear. The new ear was formed from cartilage from one of his ribs, with skin grafts put over it. Stanley said the surgery had given him "a new lease on life" and was so grateful to the surgeon that he gave him a Rolex watch upon his retirement. Because of this birth-defect, Stanley is an ambassador for the charitable organization AboutFace, an organization that provides support and information to people with facial differences. He has appeared at fundraising events and in videos to raise awareness. Stanley became involved with AboutFace after a representative saw his performance in the Phantom of the Opera in 1999.

On July 3, 1990, Stanley was involved in a near fatal car accident on his way from New York, after a KISS show in Springfield, Massachusetts. That same year he had relocated to Los Angeles full-time and has lived there ever since.

In 2001, Stanley's first wife, actress Pamela Bowen, filed for divorce after nine years of marriage. They have one son. On November 19, 2005, Stanley married long-time girlfriend Erin Sutton at the Ritz-Carlton Hotel in Pasadena, California. The couple had a son in September 2006, a daughter in January 2009, and a daughter in August 2011. Stanley considers his children Jewish but as Sutton is Catholic they raised them "100 percent Jewish and 100 percent Catholic".

Stanley has had two hip-replacement surgeries: One after the "Rock the Nation" tour in October 2004, and a second in December 2004 after complications arose from the first surgery. He had announced in 2005 that he will require a third hip surgery in the future. He regards the degeneration of his left hip as partly the product of thousands of shows performed in platform boots since the early 1970s.

In October 2011, Stanley had surgery on his vocal cords. He said, "I hold myself to a higher standard than others do. With that in mind, I wanted to remedy a few minor issues that come with 40 years of preaching rock 'n' roll".

== Awards ==
- Inducted into the Long Island Music Hall of Fame in 2006
- Showman of the Year award of the Classic Rock Awards for 2008
- Classic Gold Telly Award for his concert film One Live Kiss in 2009
- Sound Partners Lifetime Achievement Award from the House Research Institute
- Gibson.com's Reader's Poll listed Stanley among rock and roll's 25 top frontmen and -women.
- Stanley was inducted into the Rock and Roll Hall of Fame in 2014, along with original Kiss members Gene Simmons, Peter Criss, and Ace Frehley.
- In 2025, Stanley and three other Kiss members, Gene Simmons, Peter Criss, and Ace Frehley, were among the recipients of the 2025 Kennedy Center Honors.

== Discography ==
=== Studio albums ===
==== Solo ====
- Paul Stanley (1978)
- Live to Win (2006)

==== Paul Stanley's Soul Station ====
- Now and Then (2021)

==== with Kiss ====
- Kiss (1974)
- Hotter than Hell (1974)
- Dressed to Kill (1975)
- Destroyer (1976)
- Rock and Roll Over (1976)
- Love Gun (1977)
- Dynasty (1979)
- Unmasked (1980)
- Music from "The Elder" (1981)
- Creatures of the Night (1982)
- Lick It Up (1983)
- Animalize (1984)
- Asylum (1985)
- Crazy Nights (1987)
- Hot in the Shade (1989)
- Revenge (1992)
- Carnival of Souls: The Final Sessions (1997)
- Psycho Circus (1998)
- Sonic Boom (2009)
- Monster (2012)

=== Live albums ===
- Alive! (1975)
- Alive II (1977)
- Alive III (1993)
- Kiss Unplugged (1996)
- Kiss Symphony: Alive IV (2003)
- One Live Kiss (2008) (DVD and digital download)

=== Guest appearances ===
- "Fire and Water" - Lead Vocals & Producer (from the Ace Frehley album Origins, Vol. 1) (2016)
