= Neve (American band) =

- Origin: Los Angeles, California
- Genres: Alternative rock Pop rock
- Years active: 1997–2001, 2004–2005
- Labels: Columbia Records
- Website: no website

Neve was a pop rock band based out of Los Angeles, California. The band released two albums on Columbia Records, and scored one hit single in 1999, "It's Over Now."

== History ==
Neve formed in 1997, and within a year were signed to Columbia Records. Their first album was released in 1998 under the title Identify Yourself, and featured the hit single "It's Over Now," which was also included on the soundtrack to the movie The Faculty. "It's Over Now" peaked on the Billboard Modern Rock Tracks chart at No. 30 in 1999 and reached No. 25 on the Adult Top 40 chart in 2000. A second track, "Skyfall," was included in the soundtrack to the film Here on Earth. After recording two new studio tracks, Identify Yourself was reissued and rereleased as Neve in 2000, and garnered stylistic comparisons to Matchbox 20 and Nine Days. However, due to the long lag between the single's popularity and the album release, and other problems with the band's promotion, the album did not sell well, and the band was soon dropped from the label. The band parted ways in 2001.

== Post-breakup ==
After Neve's breakup in 2001, some members continued in a band called Genius. A one-off show was given in 2004; a reunion was announced in 2005 and a new album was slated for release in 2006, but this material was never released. In 2006, Genius changed its name to Stars Align due to legal issues. Stars Align re-recorded Neve's song "Absent," and recorded a 5-song EP, which was produced by Joe Don Rooney of Rascal Flatts. The self-titled EP was released but with little commercial success. As of 2010, the members of Stars Align have chosen to pursue other interests.

== Members ==
- John Stephens - Vocals, Guitar, Keyboards
- Michael Raphael - Guitar
- Tommy Gruber - Bass
- Brian Burwell - Drums

== Discography ==
Title	Album details
Neve	Released: June 13, 2000; Genres: Alternative rock, pop rock; Length: 48:21; Labels: Sony; Producers: Don Gilmore, Matt Serletic; Track listing: 1. "Digital On" - 3:18; 2. "Six Feet Under" - 3:21; 3. "It's Over Now" - 4:02; 4. "Motor" - 3:11; 5. "Same Old Story" - 3:06; 6. "Absent" - 4:26; 7. "Freeform" - 3:21; 8. "Skyfall" - 3:20; 9. "Trip and Glide" - 4:48; 10. "3 Years" - 4:12; 11. "Anything" - 2:52; 12. "Step Up" - 3:12; 13. "Drift" - 5:12
