= Nate Morton =

American drummer

Nate Morton is an American drummer. He is the drummer for the house band on NBC's TV show The Voice.

In an interview, Morton said his parents supported his interest in drumming from a very young age and bought him a drumming kit. He began formal music lessons "just before high school" with Grant Menfee of Baltimore, Maryland and eventually graduated from the Berklee College of Music.

He was the drummer for singer-songwriter Vanessa Carlton and spent two years as the drummer for Natalie Cole, toured with Chaka Khan, The Hippos, and Poe and performed with Madonna at the 2002 Grammy Awards. In 2004, Morton completed a national tour as drummer with the American Idol band.

In 2005 and 2006 Morton appeared on the Mark Burnett's Rock Star: INXS and Rock Star: Supernova reality shows, as drummer for the House Band, whose members include: guitarist Rafael Moreira, bassist Sasha Krivtsov, multi-instrumentalist Jim McGorman and keyboard player Paul Mirkovich, who is also the music director. During that time he has also appeared on two CDs, Rock Star: A Night at the Mayan Theatre, and Dark Horse, released by Ryan Star. In 2006, Morton also released a solo album, Playground Philosophy. Morton and the House Band toured the United States with Paul Stanley (from Kiss) in October/November 2006 as well as Australia in April 2007.

In 2008 Morton performed on MTV's Rock The Cradle with Rock Star (TV series) House Band members Moreira and Mirkovich. Outside of the studio he has also performed with Miley Cyrus and Morieira's band, Magnetico. Morton is also the drummer for the house band on the Bonnie Hunt Show.

Morton is endorsed by Pearl Drums, hardware and pedals and as of 2015 percussion formally endorsed by RhythmTech, as well as Zildjian drumsticks and cymbals, Roland electronics and V-Drums and Remo drumheads.
