= Sasha Krivtsov =

Russian bassist

Alexander "Sasha" Krivtsov (Russian: Александр Кривцов, romanized: Aleksandr Kryvtsov; born June 6, 1967) is a Russian bassist, best known as the bass player for the house band on the TV reality shows Rock Star: INXS, Rock Star: Supernova and The Voice. He has played with singer-songwriter Vanessa Carlton. He toured and recorded as bassist with Taylor Swift [Starlight (Taylor’s Version)], Cher, Tina Turner, James Blunt, Shakira, Christina Aguilera, Billy Idol, Badly Drawn Boy, and New Radicals. Krivtsov and the House Band (Rafael Moreira (lead guitar), Paul Mirkovich (keyboards), Jim McGorman (rhythm guitar) and Nate Morton (drums)) toured the United States and Australia with Paul Stanley (from Kiss) in October/November 2006 and April 2007, respectively.

Before immigrating to the United States, Krivtsov was a band member of the number one rock band in the Soviet Union, Zemlyane, with whom he frequently performed before crowds of more than 10,000 fans and sold 20 million records. Now living in Los Angeles with his wife and two children, Krivtsov is also an accomplished visual artist and sculptor.

Krivtsov is currently the bass player on NBC's The Voice (US) and has held that position since the show's first season. He is seasoned on the electric bass, upright bass, acoustic bass and bass synthesizer.
