= John Kalodner =

American music executive

John David Kalodner is a retired American A&R (artists and repertoire) executive.

== History ==
John David Kalodner was born in Philadelphia; he was a writer and photographer at Concert magazine. Then by 1972 he became a photographer for various record labels, as well as becoming a freelance music writer and photographer for The Philadelphia Inquirer. He wanted to be in the record industry; he was first noticed and hired as a publicist in 1974 by Atlantic Records executive Earl McGrath. His initial role at Atlantic was as a writer and photographer continuing to review concerts on the weekend for the Inquirer and commuting from New York.

Kalodner was headhunted as the first A&R executive for David Geffen's new label Geffen Records in 1980, where he worked with Asia, White Zombie, Madness, XTC, Whitesnake, Wang Chung, Nelson, and Aerosmith. Kalodner brought Jimmy Page and Sammy Hagar to success as solo artists and was responsible for the musical collaboration Coverdale•Page as well as the formation of supergroup Damn Yankees. Kalodner also placed songs on soundtracks of films including Top Gun and Footloose. He followed Aerosmith to Columbia Records in the 1990s, where he also worked with Cher, Santana, Journey, Manowar, Chicago, Heart, Iron Maiden, Joe Satriani, Steve Vai, Ted Nugent, REO Speedwagon, Mars Electric, and the Black Crowes, among others.

Kalodner considered that the best example of his contribution to an artist's success was his role in Aerosmith's album Get a Grip (1993), for the reasons that "... first of all, I made them rerecord the whole record completely. Second of all, I made them write with all these different people. They were very resistant. The record is an interesting eclectic record with... five hit singles, very rare in music, and Bruce Fairbairn produced it... I got Brendan O'Brien to mix it, who became a giant producer... for all those reasons... of course, it sold like twenty million copies worldwide." Kalodner's unique role was underlined by the fact that he is usually credited on albums for simply being himself. The phrase "John Kalodner: John Kalodner" originated with Foreigner's album Double Vision (1978), when the album's producer, Keith Olsen, was wondering how to credit Kalodner's involvement with the band and the album. In keeping with the double vision theme, Foreigner guitarist Mick Jones came up with idea of doubling Kalodner's name.

Kalodner retired from the music business in 2006. Until late 2005, he had been the senior vice-president of A&R at Sanctuary Records Group. He then sold most of his industry awards and RIAA record plaques to Scott Roderick, the president of Rock-N-Roll Warehouse, donating the proceeds to the City of Hope cancer research center. In 2014, he was inducted into the Rock Radio Hall of Fame, in the "Visionary" category.

== In other media ==
- Kalodner briefly appeared in a few Aerosmith music videos including the videos for "Let the Music Do the Talking", "Dude (Looks Like a Lady)", "The Other Side", "Eat the Rich", "Blind Man", and "Pink". He was dressed as a bride in the "Dude (Looks Like a Lady)" video as a private joke, because he almost always dresses entirely in white.
- Kalodner can be seen in Aerosmith's The Making of Pump, giving criticism and advice on the material the group presented to him for the album.
- Kalodner appeared in the "Flaming Moe's" episode of The Simpsons, which featured Aerosmith.
- Kalodner also made a cameo appearance in the video game Revolution X as the face of the sphinx in the Middle East level. Interestingly, the main characters in Revolution X are none other than Aerosmith themselves and at the time, Aerosmith was still with Geffen Records during their Get a Grip tour.
- Kalodner appeared in videos for the band Jackyl with whom he worked in the early 1990s.
- Kalodner appeared as the judge in Sammy Hagar's music video "I Can't Drive 55".
- Kalodner is credited for an edit of the Boston song "Higher Power" on Boston's Greatest Hits album.
- Kalodner appeared on the cover of GPS' (a band featuring ex-Asia band members) album Windows to the Soul (2006) as sitting in front of a TV.
- Kalodner appeared in the Wang Chung music video for "To Live and Die in L.A.".
- Kalodner appeared in the 2012 American Masters PBS television documentary entitled Inventing David Geffen.
- Kalodner was mentioned in the Korean series Twinkling Watermelon (2023).
