= Paul Mirkovich =

American musician

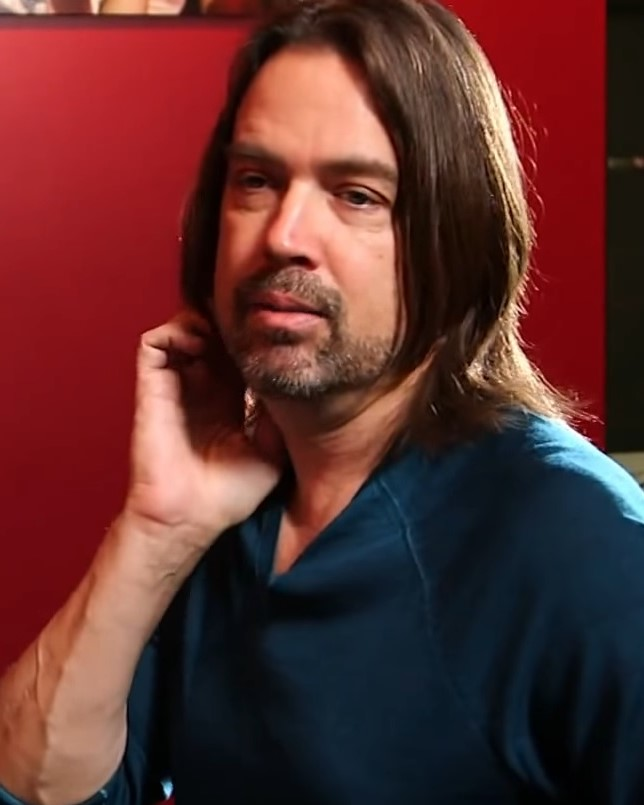
Mirkovich in 2014

Paul Mirkovich (born March 20, 1963) is an American musician, keyboardist, and musical director from Los Angeles. He has worked with artists including Cher and Janet Jackson, and was a member of the rock bands Whitesnake and Nelson. He also contributed to Brett Garsed and T. J. Helmerich's albums Quid pro quo (1992) and Exempt (1993).

Mirkovich served as musical director and keyboardist for the house band on the television series Rock Star. In 2006, he toured the United States with Paul Stanley of Kiss, followed by performances in Australia in April 2007.

Mirkovich has also served as musical director for NBC's singing competition The Voice.

In 2021, Mirkovich was credited as an executive producer on three tracks from Taylor Swift's album Red (Taylor's Version): "Sad Beautiful Tragic", "Starlight", and "The Moment I Knew". He also performed keyboards and synthesizers on the recordings.

== Musical director of the Rock Star house band ==
Mirkovich received a call from the music producer of Rock Star, Clyde Lieberman, and was asked to audition for the role of musical director for the show. He competed against 11 other musical directors who had also put bands together (a total of 75–80 musicians auditioned). Mirkovich was hired; and two of his band members, Rafael Moreira (lead guitar) and Sasha Krivtsov (bass), were also hired. Jim McGorman (rhythm guitar, keyboards) and Nate Morton (drums, percussion) were hired from the other auditioning bands. Mirkovich has also served as musical director/keyboardist for Pink from 2006 till the present. Besides Cher and Pink he has served as musical director for Janet Jackson, Christina Aguilera, Hilary Duff and others.

In a profile published by Roland, writer Greg Rule described Mirkovich's work as musical director and keyboardist for the Rock Star: INXS house band, including the demands of preparing musical arrangements for the television broadcasts.

== Early influences ==
Mirkovich developed an interest in music at an early age. He recalled beginning to play the piano at age four after hearing a cartoon theme song and later studying bebop and jazz.

== Education ==
Mirkovich graduated from Providence High School in Burbank, California, in 1981 and later attended the Dick Grove School of Music. He is of Croatian descent.
