= Men Without Hats discography =

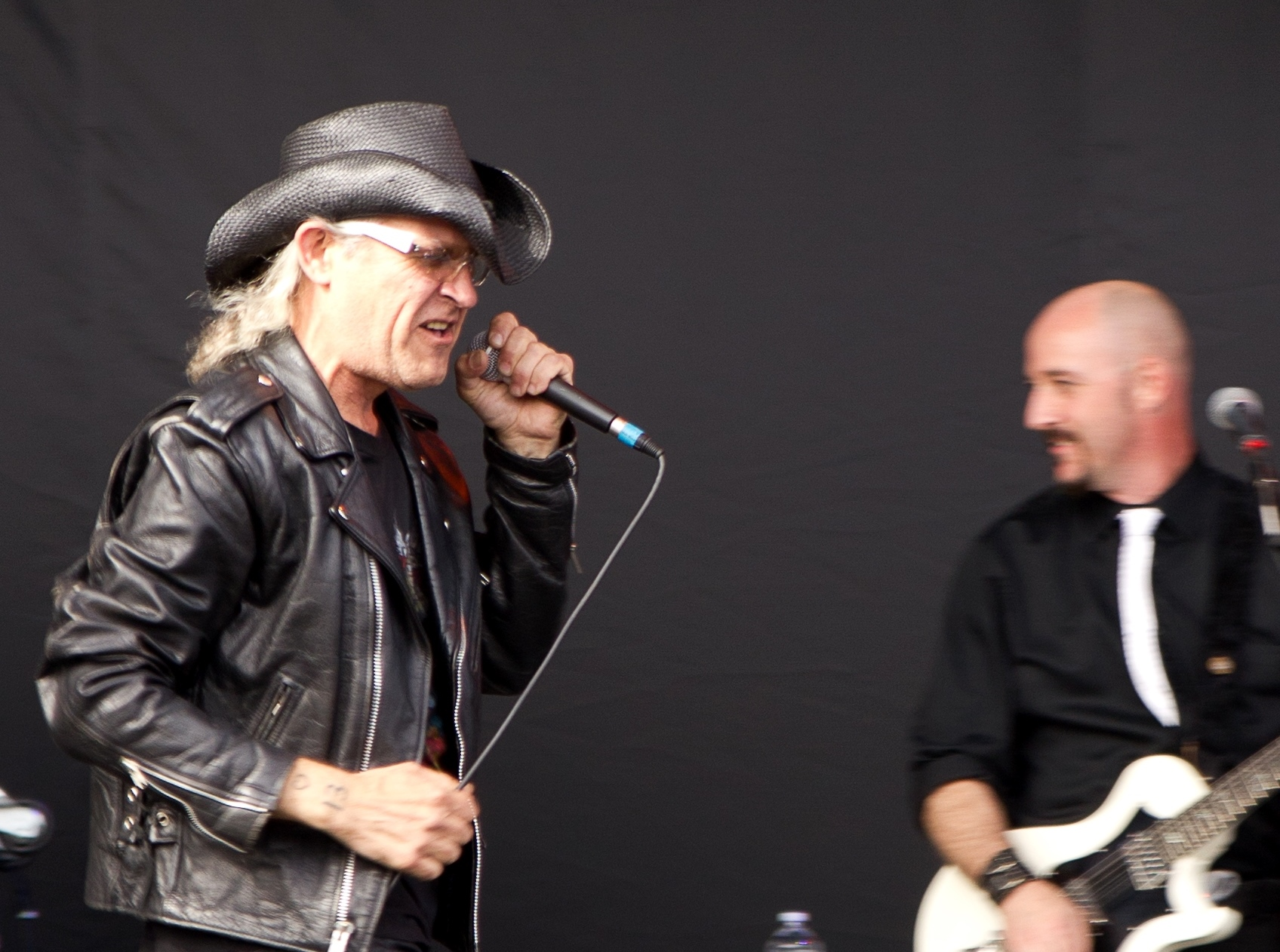
- Men Without Hats performing in 2011 (Ivan Doroschuk, vocals; James Love, guitar)
- Studio albums: 9
- EPs: 2
- Compilation albums: 5
- Singles: 11
- Video albums: 1
- Music videos: 11

This article presents a full discography of the Canadian band Men Without Hats.

== Albums ==
=== Studio albums ===
Title	Release	Peak chart positions					Certifications (sales threshold)
Title	Release	CAN	AUS	GER	UK	US	Certifications (sales threshold)
Rhythm of Youth	Release date: April 1982; Label: Statik/Backstreet/Sire	15	56	9	96	13	MC: Platinum; RIAA: Gold
Folk of the 80's (Part III)	Release date: September 1984; Label: MCA	42	—	—	—	127	
Pop Goes the World	Release date: 29 June 1987; Label: Mercury	8	—	—	—	73	MC: Platinum
The Adventures of Women & Men Without Hate in the 21st Century	Release date: October 1989; Label: Mercury	41	—	—	—	—	MC: Gold
Sideways	Release date: 30 April 1991; Label: Polygram	—	—	—	—	—	
No Hats Beyond This Point	Release date: 4 November 2003; Label: Cloud 9 Records	—	—	—	—	—	
Love in the Age of War	Release date: 22 May 2012; Label: Cobraside	—	—	—	—	—	
Again, (Part 2)	Release date: 11 March 2022; Label: Sonic Envy	—	—	—	—	—	
On the Moon	Release date: 14 November 2025; Label: Shocore/MWH	—	—	—	—	—	
"—" denotes releases that did not chart.

=== Compilation albums ===
- Collection (1996)
- Greatest Hats (1997)
- The Very Best of Men Without Hats (1997)
- My Hats Collection (2006)
- The Silver Collection (2008)

== Extended plays ==
- Folk of the 80's (1980)
- Freeways (1985)
- Again (Part 1) (2021)

== Singles ==
Year	Single	Peak chart positions									Certifications (sales thresholds)	Album
Year	Single	CAN	AUS	AUT	GER	NZ	UK	US	US Dance	US Main	Certifications (sales thresholds)	Album
1982	"I Like"	—	—	—	—	—	—	84	—	—		Rhythm of Youth
1982	"The Safety Dance"	11	5	7	2	2	6	3	1	21	MC: Gold; BPI: Gold	Rhythm of Youth
1982	"Antarctica"	—	—	—	—	—	—	—	—	—		Rhythm of Youth
1982	"I Got the Message"	—	—	—	—	—	99	—	—	—		Rhythm of Youth
1982	"Living in China"	—	—	—	—	—	—	—	—	—		Rhythm of Youth
1984	"Where Do the Boys Go?"	30	—	—	—	—	—	—	39	—		Folk of the 80's (Part III)
1984	"Messiahs Die Young"	—	—	—	—	—	—	—	—	—		Folk of the 80's (Part III)
1987	"Pop Goes the World"	2	66	1	—	15	—	20	27	—	MC: Gold	Pop Goes the World
1987	"Moonbeam"	23	—	—	—	—	—	—	46	—		Pop Goes the World
1987	"O Sole Mio"	—	—	—	—	—	—	—	—	—		Pop Goes the World
1989	"Hey Men"	8	—	—	—	—	—	—	—	—		The Adventures of Woman & Men; Without Hate in the 21st Century
1989	"In the 21st Century"	35	—	—	—	—	—	—	—	—		The Adventures of Woman & Men; Without Hate in the 21st Century
1991	"Sideways"	50	—	—	—	—	—	—	—	—		Sideways
2012	"Head Above Water"	—	—	—	—	—	—	—	—	—		Love in the Age of War
2025	"I Love the '80s"	—	—	—	—	—	—	—	—	—		On the Moon
2025	"In Glorious Days"	—	—	—	—	—	—	—	—	—		On the Moon
"—" denotes releases that did not chart

== Videography ==
=== Music videos ===
- "Security" (1980)
- "Antarctica" (1980)
- "Nationale 7" (1981)
- "The Safety Dance" (1982)
- "I Got the Message" (1982)
- "I Like" (1982)
- "Where Do the Boys Go?" (1984)
- "Pop Goes the World" (1987)
- "Moonbeam" (1987)
- "Hey Men" (1989)
- "In the 21st Century" (1989)
- "Sideways" (1991)
- "I Love the '80s" (2025)
- "In Glorious Days" (2025)

=== Video releases ===
- Live Hats (2006) - DVD

== Covers ==
- The Adventures of Women & Men Without Hate in the 21st Century featured a cover of ABBA's "SOS"
- Sideways featured a cover of The Beatles' "I Am the Walrus" (subtitled "'No You're Not', Said Little Nicola").
- The Collection and Greatest Hats compilations featured a cover of Roxy Music's "Editions of You"
- Again (Part 1) is composed entirely of covers: "Satellite of Love" by Lou Reed, "All the Young Dudes", written by David Bowie for Mott the Hoople, "Blow at High Dough" by The Tragically Hip, "2000 Light Years from Home" by The Rolling Stones, and a re-working of their own "The Safety Dance" titled "No Friends of Mine".
