= Greatest Hats =

Greatest hits album by Men Without Hats
- Released: 1996
- Recorded: 1979–1990 (GH); 1979–1988 (Collection)
- Genre: Synth-pop
- Length: 55:33 (GH); 59:24 (Collection)
- Label: Aquarius; Oglio (US)
- Producer: Ivan Doroschuk

Men Without Hats chronology
Sideways (1991)	Greatest Hats (1996)	The Spell (1997)

Alternative cover
- The US release of the album

Professional ratings
Review scores
Source	Rating
AllMusic	4.5/5 stars

Greatest Hats is the first compilation album by the Canadian new wave/synthpop group Men Without Hats, released in 1996.

A slightly modified version of the album was released in the US in 1996, entitled Collection. It dropped the tracks "Freeways (Euromix)", "On Tuesday" and "Sideways" in favor of "Messiahs Die Young", "Moonbeam", "Hey Men" and an extended version of "I Got the Message".

The two compilations have ten tracks in common, these being "The Safety Dance", "Living in China", "Antarctica", "I Got the Message", "I Like", "Where Do the Boys Go", "Pop Goes the World", "Editions of You" and the club mixes of "The Safety Dance" and "Where Do the Boys Go?". The Canadian version adds "Freeways", "On Tuesday" and "Sideways", while the US version includes "Messiahs Die Young", "Moonbeam", "Hey Men" and the club mix of "I Got the Message".

"Editions of You" was recorded in March 1985 and had not been previously released. A different version of the track was recorded in 1983, during the Folk of the 80's (Part III) sessions.

== Track listing ==
1. "The Safety Dance" - 2:43
2. "Living in China" - 3:01
3. "Antarctica" - 3:25
4. "I Got the Message" - 4:39
5. "I Like" - 4:12
6. "Where Do the Boys Go?" - 3:53
7. "Freeways" (Euromix) - 5:45
8. "Pop Goes the World" - 3:44
9. "On Tuesday" - 4:08
10. "Sideways" - 4:53
11. "Editions of You" - 3:53
12. "The Safety Dance" (Extended version) - 4:32
13. "Where Do the Boys Go?" (Extended version) - 6:17

=== Collection ===
1. "The Safety Dance"
2. "Living in China"
3. "Antarctica"
4. "I Got the Message"
5. "I Like"
6. "Where Do the Boys Go?"
7. "Messiahs Die Young"
8. "Pop Goes the World"
9. "Moonbeam"
10. "Hey Men"
11. "Editions of You"
12. "The Safety Dance" (Extended Club Mix)
13. "I Got the Message" (Dance version)
14. "Where Do the Boys Go?" (Extended version)
