= My Hats Collection =

Compilation album by Men Without Hats
- Released: 6 June 2006
- Recorded: 1978–1986
- Genre: Synthpop
- Length: 57:57
- Label: Trilogie Musique (MHC); Unidisc (TSC)
- Producer: Marc Durand

Men Without Hats chronology
No Hats Beyond This Point (2003)	My Hats Collection (2006)	Love in the Age of War (2012)

My Hats Collection is a compilation album by Canadian new wave/synthpop group Men Without Hats, released in 2006. The compilation is notable for including "Tomorrow Today", a song by a pre-Men Without Hats band called Heaven 17 (unrelated to the British band of the same name), which featured Ivan Doroschuk on keyboards, and "Gravity is My Enemy", a song from the original demo tape that got the group signed to Statik.

== Track listing ==
1. "The Safety Dance" - 2:45
2. "Living in China" - 3:04
3. "Antarctica" - 3:27
4. "I Got the Message" - 4:41
5. "I Like" - 4:13
6. "Where Do the Boys Go?" - 3:46
7. "Freeways" (Euromix) - 5:47
8. "Editions of You" - 3:56
9. "Pop Goes the World" - 3:46
10. "Tomorrow Today" - 3:56
11. "Gravity Is My Enemy" - 3:42
12. "Heaven" - 3:43
13. "The Safety Dance" (extended version) - 4:34
14. "Where Do the Boys Go?" (extended version) - 6:17

== The Silver Collection ==
In 2008, the album was reissued as The Silver Collection, a CD/DVD pack which replaced "Gravity Is My Enemy" with an extended New Wave version of "Ban the Game" (the short piano intro to Rhythm of Youth), "Rhythm of Youth" and "Treblinka" (all three come from the same demo tape) and also included a bonus DVD containing five music videos and an interview.

1. "The Safety Dance"
2. "Nationale 7"
3. "I Like"
4. "Where Do the Boys Go?"
5. "Pop Goes the World"
6. The Jeannie Becker interview (1983)
