= Sideways (Men Without Hats album) =

Studio album by Men Without Hats
- Released: 30 April 1991 (Canada); 25 January 1992 (Japan)
- Recorded: Fall 1990
- Studio: Hudson Studios (Briarcliff Manor, New York)
- Genre: Alternative rock, hard rock, country rock
- Length: 50:08
- Label: PolyGram
- Producer: Stefan Doroschuk, Mike Scott

Men Without Hats chronology
The Adventures of Women & Men Without Hate in the 21st Century (1989)	Sideways (1991)	Greatest Hats (1996)

Singles from Sideways
- 1. "Sideways" Released: April 1991; 2. "Kenbarbielove" Released: 1991; 3. "Fall Down Gently" Released: 1992

Sideways is the fifth studio album by Canadian synth-pop band Men Without Hats. Released on 30 April 1991, it featured a new sound based on electric guitars instead of the group's normal use of synthesizers. It was the second album to be recorded at Hudson Studios in New York and produced by bassist Stefan Doroschuk, with Mike Scott as co-producer.

The album was officially released only in Canada and Japan, but many imports made their way to American, European and Australian shelves.

Professional ratings
Review scores
Source	Rating
Allmusic	2/5 stars

== History ==
In December 1989, during The Adventures of Women & Men Without Hate in the 21st Century tour, guitarist Stefan Doroschuk was involved in a car accident in which both his legs and one of his arms were broken, necessitating the postponement of the tour. To pass the time, bandleader Ivan Doroschuk began jamming with Voivod drummer Michel Langevin and Doughboys member John Kastner and listening to Bleach by Nirvana, which would shape the sound of the album. According to Doroschuk, he was tired of being pressured by his record label to come up with another "Safety Dance", and instead wanted to take the album in a very different direction than anything the band had done in the past. A few months later, Stefan rejoined the band, this time switching to bass, and the new band began to tour. On 6 September 1990, Men Without Hats debuted the new image and sound in a surprise appearance at Les Foufounes Electriques in Montreal, with Mitsou Gelinas as a guest. The group performed many of their hits, rearranged in their new hard rock style, and most of the tracks that would become Sideways. The band eschewed the use of either of their logos (the crossed-out man wearing a hat and the heart with the number 21 in it) for this release, instead opting to use a simple font (MENWITHOUTHATS). They also abandoned the left-wing politics that had defined Pop Goes the World and In the 21st Century, instead writing simple non-political songs about life.

The band returned to Briarcliff Manor, where they had recorded ...In the 21st Century two years prior, to record the album. It was released in May 1991 on PolyGram/Mercury. The album was not commercially successful, which led to the group's dissolution in 1993. On 25 January 1992, Polydor released the album in Japan. The band would not release new material until No Hats Beyond This Point twelve years later.

Two singles were released to promote the album: "Sideways" (which also had an accompanying music video), and "In the Meadow". "Kenbarbielove" was also released as a promo single. The song title "Kenbarbielove" was derived from a longtime running joke between Ivan Doroschuk and Langevin; as a francophone who was not fluent in English in childhood, Langevin misunderstood the Beatles song "Can't Buy Me Love" as "Ken Barbie Love" the first time he heard it.

Due to Langevin's participation on the album, Doroschuk recorded keyboards for Voivod's album Angel Rat, which was recorded concurrently with Sideways.

On the concert tour to support the album, even the band's older hits, including "The Safety Dance," "Pop Goes the World" and "Hey Men", were readapted to fit the rock-oriented sound.

The font used for the "Sideways" wordmark on the album cover is similar to the one used on the Genesis albums Nursery Cryme and Foxtrot for that band's logo.

"Love (All Over the World)" was written for Colin Doroschuk's daughter Sahara Sloan, who had been born the year prior, and who would later join her father and uncle on the group's 2021–22 albums Men Without Hats Again.

Due to being recorded in the United States, the album does not qualify for the "P" (performance) element of MAPL Canadian content certification. The CD indicates that the album is 75% Canadian content (CanCon) except for "I Am the Walrus", which is 25% CanCon.

== Critical response ==
Evelyn Erskine of the Ottawa Citizen wrote that "All that is apparent here is that the Men have given up on sappy electro-pop. They have plugged in the heavy guitars to kick butt and wail. But their pop songcraft has not been thrown into the compost heap. The Men still have an ear for a melody and a hook which give the screaming guitars and turbo drumming their sonic direction," while Ted Shaw of the Windsor Star wrote that the album "harkens back to the late-1960s and early-'70s when rock was moving towards heavy metal but still grounded in the blues."

== Track listing ==
All tracks are written by Ivan and Stefan Doroschuk except "I Am the Walrus" by Lennon-McCartney.

No.	Title	Length
1.	"Sideways"	5:01
2.	"Fall Down Gently"	3:00
3.	"In the Meadow"	3:43
4.	"The Van der Graaf Generation Blues"	2:17
5.	"Nadine"	3:44
6.	"Everybody Wants to Know"	5:24
7.	"I Am the Walrus ("No You're Not", Said Little Nicola)"	5:05
8.	"Kenbarbielove"	4:13
9.	"Lost Forever"	6:11
10.	"Life After Diamond Head"	2:29
11.	"Love (All Over the World)"	3:47
12.	"Harry Crews"	5:14

== Singles ==
- "Sideways" (1991)
- "Kenbarbielove" (1991)
- "In the Meadow" (1992)

== Personnel ==
- Ivan Doroschuk – vocals, guitar
- Félix Matte – lead guitar
- John Kastner – rhythm guitar
- Stefan Doroschuk – bass, backing vocals
- Michel Langevin – drums (except "I Am the Walrus")
- Colin Doroschuk – keyboards, backing vocals, guitar
- Greg Martin – guitar on "I Am the Walrus"
- Corky Laing – drums on "I Am the Walrus"

== Production ==
- Produced by Stefan Doroschuk and Mike Scott
- Recorded by Mike Scott at Hudson Studios (Briarcliffe Manor), New York, 1990
- Mixed by Tom Soares and Joe Pires at Normandy Sound, Warren, Rhode Island, 1990
