= The Very Best of Men Without Hats =

Greatest hits album by Men Without Hats
- Released: 1997
- Genre: Synthpop
- Length: 59:36
- Label: CMC Entertainment

Men Without Hats chronology
The Spell (1997)	The Very Best of Men Without Hats (1997)	No Hats Beyond This Point (2003)

The Very Best of Men Without Hats is a compilation album released by Canadian new wave/synthpop group Men Without Hats, released in 1997. It is basically a compilation of most of the tracks from the group's first two albums, Rhythm of Youth and Folk of the 80's (Part III), excluding four tracks, "Ban the Game", "Ideas for Walls", "The Great Ones Remember (reprise)" and "Mother's Opinion".

The album was only released in Europe.

== Track listing ==
1. "The Safety Dance" - 2:45
2. "Living in China" - 3:04
3. "I Got the Message" - 4:50
4. "Where Do the Boys Go?" - 3:58
5. "Antarctica" - 3:33
6. "Folk of the 80's" - 4:24
7. "I Like" - 4:22
8. "No Dancing" - 2:17
9. "The Great Ones Remember" - 4:48
10. "Eurotheme" - 2:43
11. "Unsatisfaction" - 3:13
12. "Cocoricci (Le Tango des Voleurs)" - 3:24
13. "Things in My Life" - 5:05
14. "Messiahs Die Young" - 4:19
15. "I Know Their Name" - 4:01
16. "I Sing Last/Not for Tears" - 3:13
