= Angel Rat =

Studio album by Voivod
- Released: November 12, 1991
- Recorded: 1991
- Studio: Metalworks Studios, Toronto
- Genre: Progressive metal; alternative metal
- Length: 44:00
- Label: Mechanic/MCA
- Producer: Terry Brown, Steve Sinclair

Voivod chronology
Nothingface (1989)	Angel Rat (1991)	The Outer Limits (1993)

Professional ratings
Review scores
Source	Rating
AllMusic	4/5 stars
Collector's Guide to Heavy Metal	8/10
Rock Hard	9.0/10
Select	3/5
Sputnikmusic	3.5/5

Angel Rat is the sixth studio album by Canadian heavy metal band Voivod. Produced by Terry Brown of Rush fame, it was released in 1991 by Mechanic/MCA Records and is the follow-up to their critically acclaimed 1989 release Nothingface. On Angel Rat, Voivod adopted a more alternative metal sound compared to previous releases. A music video was made for the song "Clouds in My House".

While Angel Rat was released on a major record label, the album initially received mixed reviews and was not as successful as Nothingface, though it has since gained a strong cult following. Before the release of the album, bassist Jean-Yves Thériault (Blacky) departed from the group, but rejoined in 2008 (he would later leave again in 2014).

Men Without Hats bandleader Ivan Doroschuk performs keyboards on "The Outcast". This was done in return for drummer Michel Langevin recording the drums for Men Without Hats' album Sideways, recorded around the same time, and participating in the tour to promote that album.

The master tapes for the album, as well as Nothingface and The Outer Limits, were lost in the 2008 Universal Studios fire.

== Track listing ==
All songs written by Voivod

No.	Title	Length
1.	"Shortwave Intro"	0:25
2.	"Panorama"	3:13
3.	"Clouds in My House"	4:48
4.	"The Prow"	3:50
5.	"Best Regards"	3:51
6.	"Twin Dummy"	3:05
7.	"Angel Rat"	3:47
8.	"Golem"	4:46
9.	"The Outcast"	3:18
10.	"Nuage Fractal"	4:00
11.	"Freedoom"	4:42
12.	"None of the Above"	4:15
Total length:		44:00

== Personnel ==
Voivod

- Denis Bélanger – vocals
- Denis D'Amour – guitar, keyboards
- Michel Langevin – drums, cover concept
- Jean-Yves Thériault – bass guitar, keyboards

Additional musicians

- Ray Coburn – keyboards
- Ivan Doroschuk – additional keyboards on track 9

Production

- Terry Brown – producer, engineer, mixing
- John Bailey, L. Stu Young – assistant engineers
- Pierre Jasmin – computer programming
- Kiisti Matsuo – lyrical consultant
- Steve Sinclair – executive producer
