= Folk of the 80's =

EP by Men Without Hats
- Released: 1980
- Recorded: 1980
- Genre: Synth-pop
- Length: 15:19
- Label: Trend
- Producer: Marc Durand

Men Without Hats chronology
Folk of the 80's (1980)	Rhythm of Youth (1982)

Professional ratings
Review scores
Source	Rating
AllMusic	Folk of the 80's at AllMusic

Folk of the 80's is an extended play (EP) released by Canadian synth-pop group Men Without Hats. Recorded in the summer of 1980 at Studio A in Montreal, Quebec, Canada and released later that year, it was their first release.

The song "Antarctica" is featured here in its original length with an extra instrumental break and verse that does not appear in the edit used on the album Rhythm of Youth and future compilation albums. The song "Modern(e) Dancing" proved to be a minor club hit in the local Montreal alternative club scene at the time of the initial release of the EP.

The original 1984 UK CD release of Rhythm of Youth contained this EP and the extended club remix of "The Safety Dance" as bonus tracks; however, the version of "Antarctica" used there was edited.

All four songs on the record later appeared on the band's Freeways EP in 1985. In 2014, the album was reissued as a digital download; however, it used the single version of "Antarctica".

This EP is not to be confused with Folk of the 80's (Part III), the band's second studio album.

Music videos were filmed for "Antarctica" and "Security". The former features Ivan and Arrobas playing the song against a white background, with Ivan on bass and Arrobas on synths.

== Track listing ==
No.	Title	Length
1.	"Modern(e) Dancing"	4:16
2.	"Utter Space"	2:47
3.	"Antarctica"	4:33
4.	"Security (Everybody Feels Better With)"	4:00

== Personnel ==
- Ivan Doroschuk - vocals, electronics
- Jeremie Arrobas - drums, electronics

with:

- Stefan Doroschuk - bass
- Roman Martyn - guitars
- Lysanne Thibodeau - backing vocals, electronics
