= Negatron =

Negatron may refer to:

- Electron, a subatomic particle formerly and occasionally known as negatron
- An antiproton; the antimatter counterpart of the proton, as opposed to a positron
- Negatron (album), a musical album by Canadian metal band Voivod
- Negatron, a four element vacuum tube which displays a negative resistance characteristic
