= Voivod Lives =

Live album by Voivod
- Released: August 22, 2000
- Recorded: Dynamo Open Air, Eindhoven, Netherlands, May 25, 1996 (tracks 1–4); CBGB, New York City, August 11, 1996 (tracks 5–11)
- Genre: Industrial metal; progressive metal; thrash metal
- Length: 59:16
- Label: Century Media (Europe); Metal Blade (US)
- Producer: Voivod

Voivod chronology
Kronik (1998)	Voivod Lives (2000)	Voivod (2003)

Professional ratings
Review scores
Source	Rating
AllMusic	3.5/5 stars
Exclaim!	(favourable)
Rock Hard	(favourable)

Voivod Lives is the first full-length live album, and twelfth album overall, by Canadian heavy metal band Voivod. It was released in 2000 on Century Media Records in Europe and Metal Blade Records in the US. The US edition features two bonus tracks recorded in 1999 for a broadcasting on the Swedish Sveriges Radio.

== Track listing ==
All music is composed by Voivod, except where indicated.

No.	Title	Lyrics	Music	Length
1.	"Insect"	Michel Langevin, Eric Forrest		5:31
2.	"Tribal Convictions"	Voivod		5:37
3.	"Nanoman"	Langevin, Ivan Doroschuk		5:07
4.	"Nuclear War"	Denis Bélanger	Denis D'Amour, Langevin, Jean-Yves Thériault	5:20
5.	"Planet Hell"	Langevin, Forrest		4:17
6.	"Negatron"	Langevin, Kiisti Matsuo		7:26
7.	"Project X"	Langevin, Forrest		4:41
8.	"Cosmic Conspiracy"	Langevin, Forrest		6:55
9.	"Ravenous Medicine"	Bélanger		4:34
10.	"Voivod"	Bélanger	D'Amour, Langevin, Thériault	4:37
11.	"In League with Satan" (Venom cover)	Conrad Lant, Jeffrey Dunn, Tony Bray	Lant, Dunn, Bray	5:11

US edition bonus tracks
No.	Title	Lyrics	Length
12.	"The Prow" (recorded live at Klubben, Stockholm, Sweden on October 14, 1999)	Voivod	4:05
13.	"Forlorn" (recorded live at Klubben, Stockholm, Sweden on October 14, 1999)	Forrest, Langevin, Karyn Crisis Krol	6:51

== Personnel ==
Voivod

- Eric Forrest - bass guitar, vocals
- Denis D'Amour - guitar
- Michel Langevin - drums, artwork

Production

- Pierre Rémillard - mixing on tracks 1–4
- Eric Ranzenhofer - mixing on tracks 5–8
- Bruno Beauregard - mixing assistant on tracks 5–8
- Rod Shearer - mixing on tracks 9–11
- Helena "Nenne" Zetterberg - producer on tracks 12–13
- Jan Waldenmark, Staffan Schoier - engineers on tracks 12–13
