= List of Cash Box Top 100 number-one singles of 1983 =

This is a list of singles that reached number one on the Cash Box Top 100 Singles chart in 1983, presented in chronological order.

Key
†	Indicates best-performing single of 1983

Issue date	Song	Artist
January 1	"Maneater"	Daryl Hall and John Oates
January 8	"Maneater"	Daryl Hall and John Oates
January 15	"Maneater"	Daryl Hall and John Oates
January 22	"Down Under"	Men at Work
January 29	"Down Under"	Men at Work
February 5	"Down Under"	Men at Work
February 12	"Down Under"	Men at Work
February 19	"Down Under"	Men at Work
February 26	"Do You Really Want To Hurt Me"	Culture Club
March 5	"Do You Really Want To Hurt Me"	Culture Club
March 12	"Billie Jean"	Michael Jackson
March 19	"Billie Jean"	Michael Jackson
March 26	"Billie Jean"	Michael Jackson
April 2	"Billie Jean"	Michael Jackson
April 9	"Billie Jean"	Michael Jackson
April 16	"Billie Jean"	Michael Jackson
April 23	"Come on Eileen"	Dexys Midnight Runners
April 30	"Mr. Roboto"	Styx
May 7	"Beat It"	Michael Jackson
May 14	"Beat It"	Michael Jackson
May 21	"Let's Dance"	David Bowie
May 28	"Flashdance... What a Feeling" †	Irene Cara
June 4	"Flashdance... What a Feeling" †	Irene Cara
June 11	"Flashdance... What a Feeling" †	Irene Cara
June 18	"Flashdance... What a Feeling" †	Irene Cara
June 25	"Flashdance... What a Feeling" †	Irene Cara
July 2	"Flashdance... What a Feeling" †	Irene Cara
July 9	"Electric Avenue"	Eddy Grant
July 16	"Every Breath You Take"	The Police
July 23	"Every Breath You Take"	The Police
July 30	"Every Breath You Take"	The Police
August 6	"Every Breath You Take"	The Police
August 13	"Every Breath You Take"	The Police
August 20	"Every Breath You Take"	The Police
August 27	"Every Breath You Take"	The Police
September 3	"Sweet Dreams (Are Made of This)"	Eurythmics
September 10	"Sweet Dreams (Are Made of This)"	Eurythmics
September 17	"Puttin On The Ritz"	Taco
September 24	"Puttin On The Ritz"	Taco
October 1	"The Safety Dance"	Men Without Hats
October 8	"Total Eclipse of the Heart"	Bonnie Tyler
October 15	"Total Eclipse of the Heart"	Bonnie Tyler
October 22	"Total Eclipse of the Heart"	Bonnie Tyler
October 29	"Total Eclipse of the Heart"	Bonnie Tyler
November 5	"Islands in the Stream"	Kenny Rogers with Dolly Parton
November 12	"Islands in the Stream"	Kenny Rogers with Dolly Parton
November 19	"All Night Long (All Night)"	Lionel Richie
November 26	"All Night Long (All Night)"	Lionel Richie
December 3	"All Night Long (All Night)"	Lionel Richie
December 10	"Say Say Say"	Paul McCartney and Michael Jackson
December 17	"Say Say Say"	Paul McCartney and Michael Jackson
December 24	"Say Say Say"	Paul McCartney and Michael Jackson
December 31	"Union of the Snake"	Duran Duran

== See also ==
- 1983 in music
- List of Hot 100 number-one singles of 1983 (U.S.)
