= Phobos (album) =

Studio album by Voivod
- Released: August 12, 1997
- Recorded: March–April, 1997
- Studios: Signal to Noise Studios, Toronto, Canada
- Genres: Progressive metal; industrial metal; avant-garde metal
- Length: 66:30
- Labels: Hypnotic; Slipdisc (US)
- Producers: Voivod and Rob Sanzo

Voivod chronology
Negatron (1995)	Phobos (1997)	Kronik (1998)

Professional ratings
Review scores
Source	Rating
AllMusic	2/5 stars
Chronicles of Chaos	9/10
Collector's Guide to Heavy Metal	8/10
Decibel	(favourable)
Rock Hard	9.5/10
Sputnikmusic	4.5/5

Phobos is the ninth studio album by Canadian heavy metal band Voivod. Released on Hypnotic Records in 1997, it is the second and last studio album to feature bassist and vocalist Eric Forrest.

== Track listing ==
Music by Voivod and lyrics by Eric Forrest and Michel Langevin, except where indicated.

No.	Title	Lyrics	Length
1.	"Catalepsy I"		1:15
2.	"Rise"		4:55
3.	"Mercury"		5:40
4.	"Phobos"		6:57
5.	"Bacteria"		8:08
6.	"Temps mort"		1:49
7.	"The Tower"	Ivan Doroschuk, Langevin	6:10
8.	"Quantum"		6:34
9.	"Neutrino"		7:43
10.	"Forlorn"	Karyn Crisis, Forrest, Langevin	6:01
11.	"Catalepsy II"		1:07
Total length:			56:34

=== 1997 European edition bonus tracks ===
No.	Title	Lyrics	Music	Length
12.	"M-Body"	Newsted	Jason Newsted, Denis D'Amour, Langevin	3:37
13.	"21st Century Schizoid Man" (King Crimson cover)		Robert Fripp, Ian McDonald, Greg Lake, Michael Giles, Peter Sinfield	6:34
Total length:				66:30

== Credits ==
Voivod

- Eric Forrest - bass guitar, vocals
- Denis D'Amour - guitars
- Michel Langevin - drums, electronics, accordion, artwork

Guest musicians

- Karyn Crisis - vocals on track 10
- Jason Newsted - bass guitar and vocals on track 12
- Ivan Doroschuk, James Cavalluzzo - electronics

Production

- Rob Sanzo - production, mixing
- James Cavalluzzo - mixing
- Brett Zilahi - mastering
