= Kronik (album) =

Compilation album of remixes, studio and live recordings by Voivod
- Released: 1998
- Studio: Hypnotic Studios, Toronto, Ontario, Canada (tracks 4–6)
- Genre: Industrial metal; heavy metal; thrash metal
- Length: 60:40
- Label: Hypnotic

Voivod chronology
Phobos (1997)	Kronik (1998)	Voivod Lives (2000)

Professional ratings
Review scores
Source	Rating
AllMusic	3.5/5 stars
Chronicles of Chaos	8/10
Collector's Guide to Heavy Metal	7/10

Kronik is a compilation album released by the Canadian thrash metal/progressive metal band Voivod in 1998 on Hypnotic Records. It is their eleventh release altogether, featuring remixes, previously unreleased songs, and live recordings. The album features the track "Ion", which is played during the opening credits of the Heavy Metal 2000 movie. It was re-released in 2004 by Candlelight Records.

== Track listing ==
All lyrics are written by Michel Langevin and Eric Forrest, except where indicated; all music is composed by Voivod, except where indicated.

No.	Title	Lyrics	Music	Length
1.	"Forlorn" (remix by Foetus)	Langevin, Forrest, Karyn Crisis Krol		6:55
2.	"Nanoman" (remix by Haig V., Bob Eagle, "Pepe" Lopata)	Langevin, Ivan Doroschuk		5:27
3.	"Mercury" (remix by DJ? Acucrack)			5:50
4.	"Vortex" (previously unreleased)			4:39
5.	"Drift" (Negatron)			5:36
6.	"Erosion" (previously unreleased)			4:31
7.	"Ion" (from the Heavy Metal 2000 soundtrack)			4:31
8.	"Project X" (live at Huxleys Neue Welt, Berlin, Germany)			4:45
9.	"Cosmic Conspiracy" (live at Huxleys Neue Welt, Berlin, Germany)			7:30
10.	"Astronomy Domine" (live at Huxleys Neue Welt, Berlin, Germany)	Syd Barrett	Barrett	5:47
11.	"Nuclear War" (live at Huxleys Neue Welt, Berlin, Germany)	Denis Bélanger	Denis D'Amour, Langevin, Jean-Yves Thériault	5:03

== Personnel ==
Voivod

- Eric Forrest - bass guitar, vocals
- Denis D'Amour - guitar
- Michel Langevin - drums, artwork

Production

- Daryn Barry, Alfio Annibalini - engineers on tracks 4–6, mixing on tracks 4–6 and 8–11
- James Cavalluzzo - mixing on track 7
- Eric Poitevin - live recording engineer on tracks 8–11
