= Freeways (EP) =

EP by Men Without Hats
- Released: 1985
- Recorded: August–December 1980
- Studios: Studio Marko, Montreal
- Genre: Synth-pop
- Length: 32:14 (MC); 21:23 (12")
- Label: Statik
- Producer: Marc Durand

Men Without Hats chronology
Folk of the 80's (Part III) (1984)	Freeways (1985)	Pop Goes the World (1987)

Professional ratings
Review scores
Source	Rating
Allmusic	4.5/5 stars

Freeways is the second EP released by Canadian synth-pop group Men Without Hats. It was released in Canada only, and for a limited time. Released in 1985, it contains songs originally released on the group's 1980 EP Folk of the 80's, plus several versions of the song "Freeways".

== History ==
The first release of any version of the song was as a music video filmed for the French version of the song in 1981, premiering that year on Musi-Video in Montreal. "Freeways (Euromix)" first appeared as a B-side track on a European 12" edition of the "I Got the Message" single in 1982. To date, it is the only version of the song to appear on CD, being released on the Greatest Hats compilation in 1996; however, fans created a bootleg CD version of the EP including all four mixes. The version of "Freeways (Euromix)" used on Greatest Hats was ripped from vinyl and donated by a fan.

When the song was initially written in 1979, it was called "Nationale 7" and used wholly English lyrics. The title "Freeways" began being used in reference to the song in 1982, with its release on the "I Got the Message" single, but songwriter Ivan Doroschuk would still refer to it as "Nationale 7" until 1985, when the 12" was released. Ivan would also refer to the song as "Men Without Hats' secret single" (a reference to its use as a B-side), as heard on a recording of a concert in Toronto in December 1982.

The French and German lyrics used in the Euromix are translations of the original lyrics; the English lyrics used in the Euromix were completely rewritten. The original lyrics from 1979 are used in "Super 87".

Footage of the band's 1985–1986 "Freeways" tour was the basis for the 2006 DVD release Live Hats.

== Track listings ==
=== 12" version ===
1. "Modern(e) Dancing" - 4:12
2. "Utter Space" - 2:43
3. "Antarctica" - 4:28
4. "Security (Everybody Feels Better With)" - 3:56
5. "Freeways (Euromix)" - 5:45 (trilingual extended mix)

=== 7" version ===
1. "Freeways (Nationale 7)" - 3:37 (French version)
2. "Freeways (Super 87)" - 3:37 (English version)

=== Cassette version ===
1. "Modern(e) Dancing" - 4:12
2. "Utter Space" - 2:43
3. "Antarctica" - 4:28
4. "Security (Everybody Feels Better With)" - 3:56
5. "Freeways (Euromix)" - 5:45
6. "Freeways (Super 87)" - 3:37
7. "Freeways (Nationale 7)" - 3:37
8. "Freeways (Europa 8)" - 3:37 (German version)

== Personnel ==
- Ivan Doroschuk - vocals, electronics
- Roman Martyn - guitar on "Folk of the 80's"
- Tracy Howe - guitar on "Freeways"
- Stefan Doroschuk - bass
- Jeremie Arrobas - vocals, electronics
- Lisanne Thibodeau - vocals, electronics
- Recorded by Andre Perry at Le Studio Morin Heights
- "Freeways" mixed by Louis Gauthier
