= On the Moon (Men Without Hats album) =

Studio album by Men Without Hats
- Released: November 14, 2025
- Genre: Synth-pop
- Producer: Brian Howes

Men Without Hats chronology
| Again, Part 2 (2022) | On the Moon (2025) |

Singles from On the Moon
- 1. "I Love the '80s" Released: 2025; 2. "In Glorious Days" Released: 2025

On the Moon is a 2025 synth-pop album by Canadian band Men Without Hats. The debut single from the album was "I Love the '80s".

== Critical reception ==
Parade magazine said in regard to the album's debut single, "Men Without Hats' new single is titled 'I Love the '80s' and it gives music fans 'a hairsprayed wink and a shoulder-padded strut' from the singers of the iconic '80s hit 'The Safety Dance.'"

The Spill magazine called the album's debut single a "Gloriously cheeky synth-soaked anthem."

== Track listing ==
All tracks are written by Ivan Doroschuk, except "I Love the '80s" and "In Glorious Days" (written by Doroschuk and Brian John Howes) and "Jealous Guy" (written by John Lennon).

On the Moon track listing
| No. | Title | Length |
|---|---|---|
| 1. | "I Love the '80s" | 3:42 |
| 2. | "In Glorious Days" | 3:39 |
| 3. | "If You Try" | 3:27 |
| 4. | "Run Away" | 4:23 |
| 5. | "Love Me Tomorrow" | 4:20 |
| 6. | "À Cause De Toi" | 4:34 |
| 7. | "Jealous Guy" | 4:20 |

== Personnel ==
Credits adapted from Tidal.

- Ivan Doroschuk – vocals, keyboards
- Sahara Doroschuk Sloan – keyboards (tracks 1, 2, 6), vocals (1), background vocals (2–7)
- Sho Murray – guitar, production, mixing (3–7)

=== Additional contributors ===
- Brian John Howes – production, guitar (1, 2)
- Mark Needham – mixing (1, 2)
- Howie Weinberg – mastering (1, 2)
- Greg Reely – mastering (3–7)
