= The Spell (Ivan Doroschuk album) =

Studio album by Ivan Doroschuk
- Released: April 25, 1997
- Recorded: 1996–1997
- Genre: Synthpop
- Length: 46:14
- Label: Tox
- Producer: John Punter

Ivan Doroschuk chronology
Greatest Hats (1997)	The Spell (1997)	The Very Best of Men Without Hats (1997)

Professional ratings
Review scores
Source	Rating
AllMusic	2.5/5 stars

The Spell is a 1997 solo album by singer and songwriter Ivan Doroschuk, the leader of Men Without Hats, recording as "Ivan."

== Production ==
The release and songwriting credits for The Spell used only Doroschuk's first name.

The Spell was the only solo album that Doroschuk released. He recorded demos for an intended solo follow-up, Mote in God's Eye, some of which were worked into the 2003 album No Hats Beyond This Point and released under the name of Men Without Hats.

Two singles from the album, "Open Your Eyes" and "Superbadgirls", were released with music videos.

== Critical reception ==
Writing for AllMusic, Aaron Badgley wrote that the album was a "disappointing affair", referring to "Superbadgirls" as "embarrassing." He nevertheless described the title track and "Open Your Eyes" as "highlights."

== Track listing ==
All songs written by Ivan Doroschuk, except as noted.

1. "The Spell"
2. "Superbadgirls"
3. "Chain Reaction"
4. "Open Your Eyes"
5. "1972 (Slippin' Away)"
6. "You" – (Colin Doroschuk)
7. "Forever"
8. "WWW"
9. "Somethin'"
10. "Fly"
11. "Outro"
