= Sideways (Men Without Hats song) =

Single by Men Without Hats

from the album Sideways
- Released: April 1991
- Recorded: 1990, Hudson Studios, Briarcliff Manor, New York
- Genre: Hard rock
- Length: 5:00
- Label: Mercury
- Songwriter(s): Ivan and Stefan Doroschuk
- Producer(s): Stefan Doroschuk

Men Without Hats singles chronology
"Here Come the '90s" (1990)	"Sideways" (1991)	"Kenbarbielove" (1991)

"Sideways" is the first single by Canadian synth-pop band Men Without Hats from the album of the same name, released in 1991.

== History ==
In the press release, bandleader Ivan Doroschuk described "Sideways" as being about how there are other ways of looking at things. In an interview with The Georgia Straight in July 1991, he also described how "Sideways" was originally an ode to early morning sex.

The song itself is a hard rock song in E major.

== Music video ==
A music video was filmed for "Sideways", showing the band playing the song.
