= List of Billboard number-one R&B albums of 1983 =

These are the Billboard magazine R&B albums that have reached number-one in 1983.

| Issue date | Album | Artist(s) |
|---|---|---|
| January 1 | Midnight Love | Marvin Gaye |
| January 8 | Midnight Love | Marvin Gaye |
| January 15 | Midnight Love | Marvin Gaye |
| January 22 | Midnight Love | Marvin Gaye |
| January 29 | Thriller | Michael Jackson |
| February 5 | Thriller | Michael Jackson |
| February 12 | Thriller | Michael Jackson |
| February 19 | Thriller | Michael Jackson |
| February 26 | Thriller | Michael Jackson |
| March 5 | Thriller | Michael Jackson |
| March 12 | Thriller | Michael Jackson |
| March 19 | Thriller | Michael Jackson |
| March 26 | Thriller | Michael Jackson |
| April 2 | Thriller | Michael Jackson |
| April 9 | Thriller | Michael Jackson |
| April 16 | Thriller | Michael Jackson |
| April 23 | Thriller | Michael Jackson |
| April 30 | Thriller | Michael Jackson |
| May 7 | Thriller | Michael Jackson |
| May 14 | Thriller | Michael Jackson |
| May 21 | Thriller | Michael Jackson |
| May 28 | Thriller | Michael Jackson |
| June 4 | Thriller | Michael Jackson |
| June 11 | Thriller | Michael Jackson |
| June 18 | Thriller | Michael Jackson |
| June 25 | Thriller | Michael Jackson |
| July 2 | Thriller | Michael Jackson |
| July 9 | Thriller | Michael Jackson |
| July 16 | Thriller | Michael Jackson |
| July 23 | Between the Sheets | The Isley Brothers |
| July 30 | Thriller | Michael Jackson |
| August 6 | Thriller | Michael Jackson |
| August 13 | Thriller | Michael Jackson |
| August 20 | Thriller | Michael Jackson |
| August 27 | Thriller | Michael Jackson |
| September 3 | Thriller | Michael Jackson |
| September 10 | Thriller | Michael Jackson |
| September 17 | Cold Blooded | Rick James |
| September 24 | Cold Blooded | Rick James |
| October 1 | Cold Blooded | Rick James |
| October 8 | Cold Blooded | Rick James |
| October 15 | Cold Blooded | Rick James |
| October 22 | Cold Blooded | Rick James |
| October 29 | Cold Blooded | Rick James |
| November 5 | Cold Blooded | Rick James |
| November 12 | Cold Blooded | Rick James |
| November 19 | Cold Blooded | Rick James |
| November 26 | Can't Slow Down | Lionel Richie |
| December 3 | Can't Slow Down | Lionel Richie |
| December 10 | Can't Slow Down | Lionel Richie |
| December 17 | Can't Slow Down | Lionel Richie |
| December 24 | Can't Slow Down | Lionel Richie |
| December 31 | Can't Slow Down | Lionel Richie |

== See also ==
- 1983 in music
- List of number-one R&B singles of 1983 (U.S.)
- Hot 100 number-one hits of 1983 (United States)
