= Negatron (album) =

Studio album by Voivod
- Released: November 21, 1995
- Studio: Hypnotic (Toronto)
- Genre: Avant-garde metal
- Length: 51:39
- Label: Hypnotic; Mausoleum/BMG (US)
- Producer: Daryn Barry, Alfio Annibalini & Voivod

Voivod chronology
The Outer Limits (1993)	Negatron (1995)	Phobos (1997)

Professional ratings
Review scores
Source	Rating
AllMusic	2.5/5 stars
Chronicles of Chaos	8/10
Collector's Guide to Heavy Metal	8/10
Rock Hard	8.5/10
Sputnikmusic	3.5/5

Negatron is the eighth studio album by Canadian heavy metal band Voivod, released on November 21, 1995, through Hypnotic Records worldwide and Mausoleum Records in the United States. It is the first studio album not to feature original singer Denis "Snake" Bélanger, who temporarily left the band in 1994, with bass player Eric Forrest assuming vocal duties for the recording. The album also features Foetus frontman JG Thirlwell as a guest vocalist on the final track "D.N.A. (Don't No Anything)".

== Album information ==
The album is considered a departure from Voivod's previous progressive metal style, with the band adopting elements of industrial metal while "they pollute their avant-garde punk metal" and death metal growls within a heavy metal framework.

The CD release is notable for including multimedia tracks in CD-ROM format, which was a novelty at the time.

== Track listing ==
All music by Voivod. All lyrics by Michel Langevin and Eric Forrest, except where indicated.

No.	Title	Writer(s)	Length
1.	"Insect"		5:41
2.	"Project X"		4:49
3.	"Nanoman"	Langevin, Ivan Doroschuk	5:11
4.	"Reality?"		4:21
5.	"Negatron"	Langevin, Kiisti Matsuo	7:08
6.	"Planet Hell"		4:34
7.	"Meteor"		4:14
8.	"Cosmic Conspiracy"		6:10
9.	"Bio-TV"		4:55
10.	"Drift"		5:41
11.	"D.N.A. (Don't No Anything)"	JG Thirlwell	4:36

- A limited edition of 750 copies was available with the same track listing. This limited edition came in a tin box with a Negatron sticker.

== Personnel ==
Voivod

- Eric Forrest - vocals, bass guitar
- Denis D'Amour - guitars, effects
- Michel Langevin - drums, percussion, artwork

Additional musicians

- JG Thirlwell - vocals & FX on "D.N.A. (Don't No Anything)"

Production

- Daryn Barry, Alfio Annibalini - producers, engineers, mixing
- Bruce Longman, Michael Zarich - assistant engineers
- Rob Fischer, Joe Melo - digital editing
- Eddy Schreyer - mastering
