= Louise Court =

British journalist and magazine editor

Louise Court (born 1960) is a British journalist and former editor of the UK edition of Cosmopolitan, best known for her appearance in the video for Men Without Hats' song "The Safety Dance".

== Early life ==
Court was born in south-west London. Her father was news editor on the Daily Mail and Sunday Mirror. In 1983, she appeared in the videos for the singles "The Safety Dance" and "I Like" by Men Without Hats, credited as "Jenny", but her identity was unknown until 2013.

== Career ==
Court's early journalism career included work as an entertainment writer at Express Newspapers, deputy editor of Prima, and assistant editor of Woman's Own. In 1994, she joined Best magazine as deputy editor, becoming editor in 1998. In 2005, she worked for ACP-NatMag, overseeing Best, Reveal and Real People.

She became the editor of Cosmopolitan (UK) in November 2006. She was editor of Cosmopolitan until July 2015. As of 2018, she was consultant director of commercial content for Time, Inc.

== Personal life ==
She has two sons.

Media offices
Preceded by	Editor of Cosmopolitan (UK); November 2006 - July 2015	Succeeded by
Preceded by	Editor of Best; 1998 - 2005	Succeeded by
