= Eric Forrest =

Canadian heavy metal musician

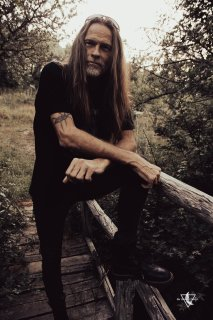

Background information
- Born: February 13, 1970 (age 56); Toronto, Ontario, Canada
- Genres: Heavy metal, thrash metal
- Occupations: Musician, songwriter
- Instruments: Bass, vocals
- Years active: 1988–present
- Formerly of: Voivod

Eric Forrest (born 1970) is a Canadian heavy metal musician. Active since 1988, Forrest is best known for playing in a number of metal bands, including Voivod, E-Force, and Project Failing Flesh.

== Career ==
During the late 1980s and early 1990s, Forrest was a member of the bands Liquid Indian and Thunder Circus. He joined Voivod in early 1994 as bassist and vocalist, picking up the nickname "E-Force". He recorded two studio albums with Voivod, Negatron (1995) and Phobos (1997), and the live album Voivod Lives (2000), before departing in 2001 when original singer Denis "Snake" Bélanger returned.

Upon his departure from Voivod, Forrest formed his own band called E-Force. In 2003, he formed the band Project: Failing Flesh in Vienna, Virginia, which released three albums up to 2012. In 2017, Forrest conducted a European tour in which he performed songs from the Negatron and Phobos albums by Voivod. The band assembled for that tour, operating under the name E-Force Performing Voivod, continued touring and played at the Brutal Assault festival in 2018.

In 2020, Forrest announced the forthcoming album called Mindbender.

In 2021, the band signed with the Danish label Mighty Music: Mindbender was released on September 19, 2021.

Forrest will perform with Voivod for the first time in 25 years for their summer 2026 European tour as a fill-in for Snake, who was unable to perform due to a "family matter".

== Health ==
In February 2026, Forrest revealed that he was diagnosed with stage 3 prostate cancer in 2024. He opened a GoFundMe campaign to help to his treatment.

== Discography ==
=== Voivod ===
- Negatron (1995)
- Phobos (1997)
- Kronik (1998)
- Voivod Lives (2000)

=== E-Force ===
- Evil Forces (2003)
- Modified Poison (2008)
- The Curse (2014)
- Demonikhol (2015)
- Mindbender (2021)

=== Project: Failing Flesh ===
- A Beautiful Sickness (2004)
- The Conjoined (2007)
- Count Back from Ten (2010)
