= The Adventures of Women & Men Without Hate in the 21st Century =

Studio album by Men Without Hats
- Released: October 1989
- Recorded: 1988
- Studio: Hudson Studios (Briarcliff Manor, New York)
- Genre: Synth-pop; pop rock
- Length: 51:17
- Label: Mercury
- Producer: Stefan Doroschuk

Men Without Hats chronology
Pop Goes the World (1987)	The Adventures of Women & Men Without Hate in the 21st Century (1989)	Sideways (1991)

Singles from The Adventures of Women & Men Without Hate in the 21st Century
- 1. "Hey Men" Released: 1989; 2. "In the 21st Century" Released: 1989

Professional ratings
Review scores
Source	Rating
AllMusic	2/5 stars

The Adventures of Women & Men Without Hate in the 21st Century, often shortened to In the 21st Century, is the fourth studio album by Canadian synth-pop group Men Without Hats, released in 1989. It was the second and last album to be released with the lineup of Ivan Doroschuk (vocals), Stefan Doroschuk (guitar), Marika Tjelios (bass), Heidi Garcia (backing vocals), Richard Samson (drums) and Bruce Murphy (keyboards), which was also the lineup that toured to promote the previous album Pop Goes the World.

== Recording history ==
The lineup that recorded the album was essentially the touring band from Pop Goes the World.

Ivan Doroschuk, in an interview released on a promotional disc around the time of the album, stated that the original title of the album was The Adventures of Men Without Hats in the 21st Century, but the title went through several revisions, including The Adventures of Men and Women Without Hats in the 21st Century before swapping the order of "Men and Women" around and changing the word "Hats" to "Hate". In the same interview, Ivan also explained that the band decided to omit their crossed-out-man-with-hat logo due to Ivan hearing about a Jamaican bar prohibiting Rastafarians from entering, which was indicated using a sign that looked similar to the group's logo. A new logo, a heart with the number 21 in it, was devised for the album, being used for all artwork related to the record.

The album was recorded in 1988 at Wizard Studios in Briarcliff Manor, New York. The group would return in 1990 to record the followup, Sideways.

The album is much more serious than the group's previous work, with lyrics focusing on subjects such as environmentalism ("In the 21st Century"), domestic violence ("Hey Men") and commercialism ("Everybody's Selling Something", "I'm in Love"). There are also simple songs about love and life ("You and Me", "All We Do", "Eloise and I", "Underneath the Rainbow"). Musically, it is a pop rock album with slight synthpop influence.

"All We Do", one of three ballads on the album, was written in 1986 and performed on the tour to promote Pop Goes the World. The other two ballads are "You and Me" and "Underneath the Rainbow".

The final track, "21st Century Safety Dance", was described by Ivan in the press release for the album as a "warning" track, explaining his beliefs that all music would sound like it unless people "got [their] act together".

Due to being recorded in the United States, the album does not qualify for the "P" (performance) element of MAPL Canadian content certification. The CD indicates that the album is 75% Canadian content (CanCon) except for "S.O.S.", which is 25% CanCon.

== Singles ==
The initial track of this album and "Hey Men" both became singles with corresponding music videos. "Here Come the '90s" and "You and Me" were also released as promo singles.

The music video to "In the 21st Century", filmed in early 1990, shows the band performing against a starry backdrop while imagery from the album cover flashes by. Guitarist Stefan Doroschuk appears in a wheelchair, having been involved in a car accident in which both of his legs and one of his arms were broken a month prior.

In addition, the vocals of the children speaking and laughing on the track "In the 21st Century" were performed by the Studio owner's children: Elton & Risa who were present at the time of recording and having such fun banter that they were sampled for the track.

== Charts ==
The album was certified gold by Music Canada in October 1989, for Canadian sales of over 50,000 units.

== Track listing ==
All tracks are written by Ivan and Stefan Doroschuk except "S.O.S." by Björn Ulvaeus, Benny Andersson and Stig Anderson.

No.	Title	Length
1.	"In the 21st Century"	6:16
2.	"Hey Men"	5:04
3.	"You & Me"	5:44
4.	"Everybody's Selling Something"	2:54
5.	"Here Come the '90s"	4:52
6.	"S.O.S."	3:58
7.	"All We Do"	4:47
8.	"I'm in Love"	4:58
9.	"Eloise and I"	4:15
10.	"Underneath the Rainbow"	3:28
11.	"21st Century Safety Dance"	5:03

On CD copies of the album, the intro to "Eloise and I" is indexed as a separate track running 1:10 (listed on some copies as "Intro: Eloise"), while the song itself runs 3:05. The intro is omitted from South African LP copies of the album. "You and Me" is preceded by an unlisted piano intro, which is entitled "Isle of You" according to the BMI database.

== Personnel ==
- Ivan Doroschuk – vocals
- Stefan Doroschuk – guitars, bass, keyboards
- Marika Tjellos – keyboard bass
- Lenny Pinkas – keyboards, programming
- Bruce Murphy – keyboards
- Richard Samson – drums
- Heidi Garcia, Colin Doroschuk – backing vocals
