= Nothingface (Voivod album) =

Studio album by Voivod
- Released: October 13, 1989
- Recorded: 1989
- Studios: Victor Studio (Montreal, Canada)
- Genres: Thrash metal, progressive metal, space rock
- Length: 44:27
- Labels: Mechanic/MCA; Noise (Germany)
- Producers: Glen Robinson, Steve Sinclair

Voivod chronology
Dimension Hatröss (1988)	Nothingface (1989)	Angel Rat (1991)

Nothingface is the fifth studio album by Canadian heavy metal band Voivod. It was released by Mechanic/MCA Records on 1989. The album marked a change for the band, expanding their music into a more progressive rock/metal sound. Several riffs are heavily influenced by Igor Stravinsky's "The Rite of Spring", specifically the centre section of "Pre-Ignition".

A music video made for the album's third track, a cover of Pink Floyd's "Astronomy Domine", received airplay on MTV's Headbangers Ball.

== Music and lyrics ==
The sound on Nothingface is rooted in progressive rock, and incorporates elements of thrash metal and space rock. Vocal melody is heavily emphasized on the album. Greg Prato of AllMusic stated that "although the album's roots are in progressive rock, the group knows when to lay off the virtuosic overkill and play it straight." Eduardo Rivadavia of Loudwire said the band "reinvigorated the late ‘80s thrash scene with exciting new dimensions, like Snake’s cybernetic voice, Blacky’s vine-like bass, Away’s clinical percussion, and Piggy’s melodic sensibility and jazz-like guitar work."

The album's lyrics explore themes such as science fiction, and have been described as "paint[ing] unsettling pictures." According to Rivadavia: "Canada’s Voivod flirted with technology – albeit the cartoonish, apocalyptic variety – from day one, before embracing it, and finally conquering it with [...] Nothingface."

== Reception and legacy ==
Professional ratings
Review scores
Source	Rating
AllMusic	4.5/5 stars
Collector's Guide to Heavy Metal	7/10
NME	9/10
Rock Hard	9.5/10
Sputnikmusic	5/5

Nothingface is Voivod's most successful album to date, and their only album to enter the Billboard 200 charts, where it peaked at number 114.

In 2005, Nothingface was ranked number 350 in Rock Hard magazine's book The 500 Greatest Rock & Metal Albums of All Time. Loudwire named the album at number 23 in their list "Top 25 Progressive Metal Albums of All Time". Kerrang! described the album as a "prog-thrash masterpiece".

Greg Prato of AllMusic gave the album four-and-a-half-stars out of five, saying: "Arguably the best of the Denis Belanger-era Voivod albums, Nothingface is highly recommended to just about any aficionado of twisted, original heavy metal or prog rock. Jason Newsted, [formerly] of Metallica has praised Voivod as one of his favorite metal bands on numerous occasions, and after hearing Nothingface, it's easy to understand why."

== Track listing ==
All music written by Denis D'Amour, Jean-Yves Thériault and Michel Langevin, all lyrics by Denis Bélanger, except "Astronomy Domine" written by Syd Barrett.

No.	Title	Length
1.	"The Unknown Knows"	5:56
2.	"Nothingface"	4:14
3.	"Astronomy Domine" (Pink Floyd cover)	5:30
4.	"Missing Sequences"	5:49
5.	"X-Ray Mirror"	4:28
6.	"Inner Combustion"	3:48
7.	"Pre-Ignition"	5:11
8.	"Into My Hypercube"	5:03
9.	"Sub-Effect"	4:29

Note: The original version combined the intro track and "The Unknown Knows" into one track. On later versions, both tracks were separated, with the intro track being either the first track or a pre-gap hidden track, which is followed by "The Unknown Knows".

== Personnel ==
Voivod

- Snake (Denis Bélanger) – vocals
- Piggy (Denis D'Amour) – guitar
- Blacky (Jean-Yves Thériault) – bass
- Away (Michel Langevin) – drums, artwork

Production

- Glen Robinson – producer, engineer, mixing
- Benoit Lavallée, Rob Sutton – assistant engineers
- Steve Sinclair – executive producer
