= Hey Men =

Single by Men Without Hats

from the album The Adventures of Women & Men Without Hate in the 21st Century
- B-side: "Underneath the Rainbow"; "21st Century Safety Dance"
- Released: 1989
- Recorded: 1988, Hudson Studios, Briarcliff Manor, New York
- Genre: Pop rock
- Length: 5:00; 3:39 (single edit)
- Label: Mercury
- Songwriters: Ivan and Stefan Doroschuk
- Producer: Stefan Doroschuk

Men Without Hats singles chronology
"O Sole Mio" (1987)	"Hey Men" (1989)	"In the 21st Century" (1989)

"Hey Men" is a song from Canadian new wave/synthpop band Men Without Hats' fourth album, The Adventures of Women & Men Without Hate in the 21st Century, released as the album's first single in 1989.

== History ==
The song is based on experiences bandleader Ivan Doroschuk had during his teenage years and is an anti-domestic violence song; the chorus implores men to "stop pushing your women down" and "quit knocking your children around". In later interviews, however, Doroschuk acknowledged that he had received some criticism for the lyrics, because "your women" implied possession rather than partnership.

In early reviews of the album, Mark Lepage of the Montreal Gazette singled the song out for praise as "a round-edged Chuck Berry thing with a winning chorus and a feminist nudge", while Helen Metella of the Edmonton Journal called it a "snappy put-down of a male-dominated globe" and singled it out as one of the high points of the album.

In early December while the song was still in the midst of its chart run, band member Stefan Doroschuk was struck by a car in Montreal, breaking both legs and his hand and forcing the band to postpone its concert tour to support the album.

== Chart performance ==
The song entered the RPM100 singles chart in October 1989, debuting at #72 in the week of October 16. Initially, the song was only modestly successful, and appeared to have stalled out on the charts by December; however, following the École Polytechnique massacre on December 6, the song suddenly jumped into the Top 10 in the week of December 16, 1989 on the basis of increased radio airplay because of its anti-violence stand.
