= Pop Goes the World =

Studio album by Men Without Hats
- Released: June 29, 1987
- Recorded: 1986–1987
- Genre: New wave; synth-pop; dance-rock
- Length: 41:34
- Label: Mercury
- Producer: Zeus B. Held; Men Without Hats

Men Without Hats chronology
Freeways (1985)	Pop Goes the World (1987)	The Adventures of Women & Men Without Hate in the 21st Century (1989)

Singles from Pop Goes the World
- 1. "Pop Goes the World" Released: October 1987; 2. "Moonbeam" Released: 1987; 3. "O Sole Mio" Released: 1987 (Canada only)

Professional ratings
Review scores
Source	Rating
AllMusic	4/5 stars

Pop Goes the World is the third studio album by Canadian new wave and synth-pop band Men Without Hats, released on June 29, 1987, by Mercury Records. It features the single "Pop Goes the World", which reached the Top 20 in Canada (achieving gold status) and the United States. The album went platinum in Canada.

Ian Anderson of Jethro Tull performs flute on the song "On Tuesday".

== Other songs ==
Early in the recording sessions, a song called "The Same Halo" was recorded by the band for the album but was ultimately replaced by "Lose My Way" on the album.

"Jenny Wore Black" was first performed live in 1985 during the "Freeways" tour. Another song from the era, "Heaven", was never released until 2022, when it was included on the band's eighth studio album, Again, Pt. 2. "All We Do", which was performed on the Pop Goes the World tour, was instead released on the followup, The Adventures of Women & Men Without Hate in the 21st Century (1989).

In 1990, Doroschuk wrote the song "A Funny Place (The World Is)", which reused part of the lyrics from "The Real World". It was recorded with Mitsou on her second studio album, Terre des hommes (1990); Doroschuk sang backing vocals, played various instruments and produced the recording.

A French-language demo called "Pyjamarama" was recorded the following year.

== Singles ==
Along with the title track, two other singles from this album were released, but neither got much notice. These singles were "Moonbeam", which featured a complementing music video, and "O Sole Mio" that was backed by "Lose My Way" as a promo single.

== Track listing ==
All tracks written by Ivan Doroschuk.

Side one

1. "Intro" – 1:49
2. "Pop Goes the World" – 3:43
3. "On Tuesday" – 4:08
4. "Bright Side of the Sun" – 0:42
5. "O Sole Mio" – 3:57
6. "Lose My Way" – 3:10
7. "The Real World" – 4:24

Side two

8. "Moonbeam" – 3:37
9. "In the Name of Angels" – 3:49
10. "La Valse d'Eugénie" – 1:28
11. "Jenny Wore Black" – 2:57
12. "Intro/Walk on Water" – 5:43
13. "The End (Of the World)" – 3:23

== Personnel ==
Men Without Hats

- Ivan Doroschuk — vocals, guitar, keyboards, drum programming
- Stefan Doroschuk — vocals, guitar, bass, keyboards
- Lenny Pinkas — keyboards

Special guest

- Ian Anderson — flute on "On Tuesday"

== Concept ==
The album artwork, however, lists the following:

- Ivan — vocals
- Johnny — guitar
- Jenny — bass
- J. Bonhomme — drums
- and a little baby on keyboards

Johnny, Jenny, J. Bonhomme and the baby were actually characters from the opening song "Pop Goes the World"—the album graphics were designed to reference their roles in the song, which opens with the line "Johnny played gee-tar, Jenny played bass".

The album follows a loose conceptual thread, and Johnny and Jenny go on to appear as characters in numerous other songs on the disc, being mentioned by name in "In the Name of Angels" "Jenny Wore Black" and "The End (Of The World)". The role of "Johnny" on the album cover (and in videos) was played by Stefan Doroschuk, the band's actual guitarist. The actress who played Jenny is unknown, although she is often believed to be Louise Court. Bonhomme is also referenced in the song "Pop Goes The World" (as "a big bonhomme"). A Bonhomme de neige is a snowman; a character known as "Bonhomme Carnaval" (a man in a stylized snowman costume with a stocking cap or a top hat) is a common mascot at Quebec winter carnivals. The album cover shows the character Bonhomme as the band's drummer. The initial J. would seem to be a bilingual pun, referencing both the French phrase "Joyeux bonhomme" and the English rock drummer John Bonham. Furthermore, a potential early version of J. Bonhomme can be seen in the band's 1984 single, "Where Do The Boys Go?"

The only credited musician aside from the Doroschuks and Pinkas is Ian Anderson of the rock group Jethro Tull. Anderson plays flute on track 3, "On Tuesday".

The Pop Goes the World touring band between 1987 and 1988 consisted of:

- Ivan Doroschuk — vocals, guitar, keyboards
- Stefan Doroschuk — guitar
- Marika Tjelios — bass
- Richard Samson — drums
- Lenny Pinkas, Heidi Garcia, Bruce Murphy — keyboards

== Certifications ==
Certifications for Pop Goes the World
Region	Certification	Certified units/sales
Canada (Music Canada)	Platinum	100,000^{^}
^{^} Shipments figures based on certification alone.
