= Love in the Age of War =

Studio album by Men Without Hats
- Released: May 22, 2012 (CAN); June 5, 2012 (US)
- Recorded: December 2011–February 2012, Mushroom and Hipposonic Studios, Vancouver, British Columbia
- Genre: New wave, synthpop
- Length: 41:28
- Label: Cobraside
- Producer: Dave "Rave" Ogilvie

Men Without Hats chronology
My Hats Collection (2006)	Love in the Age of War (2012)	Men Without Hats Again, Parts 1 and 2 (2021–2022)

Singles from Love in the Age of War
- 1. "Head Above Water" Released: April 20, 2012

Professional ratings
Review scores
Source	Rating
AllMusic	3/5 stars

Love in the Age of War, released in 2012, is the seventh studio album by Canadian new wave group Men Without Hats.

== Production ==
Love in the Age of War, originally expected to be titled Folk of the 80's (Part IV), was the first studio album by Men Without Hats after a hiatus of over eight years. It featured ten original songs written by Ivan Doroschuk.

It is the group's only album to feature guitarist James Love, who was replaced by Sho Murray in late 2016. It is also the only album to feature keyboardists Mark Olexson, who was replaced by Rachel Ashmore after the album was released, and Louise Dawson.

The songs were written by Doroschuk "in the back of the bus" while touring in the summer of 2011 with The Human League, and were recorded from December 2011 to February 2012.

Produced by Dave "Rave" Ogilvie of Skinny Puppy fame, the album was released on May 22, 2012 in Canada, and worldwide on June 5, 2012.

== Track listing ==
1. "Devil Come Round" (4:05)
2. "Head Above Water" (3:36)
3. "Everybody Knows" (3:43)
4. "The Girl with the Silicon Eyes" (3:59)
5. "This War Intro" (0:27)
6. "This War" (4:02)
7. "Your Beautiful Heart" (5:04)
8. "Live and Learn" (4:12)
9. "Close to the Sun" (4:36)
10. "Love’s Epiphany" (4:05)
11. "Love in the Age of War" (3:40)

== Personnel ==
Members

- Ivan Doroschuk - voice and electronics
- Lou Dawson - vocals and live keyboards
- James Love - guitars
- Colin Doroschuk - vocals
- Mark Olexson - live keyboards and programming.

== Singles ==
"Head Above Water"

Single by Men Without Hats

from the album Love in the Age of War
- Released: April 20, 2012
- Recorded: 2012
- Genre: New wave, post-punk
- Length: 3:36
- Label: Cobraside
- Songwriter(s): Ivan Doroschuk
- Producer(s): Dave "Rave" Ogilvie

Men Without Hats singles chronology
"In the Meadow" (1992)	"Head Above Water" (2012)

"Head Above Water", the first and only single from Love in the Age of War, premiered on Montreal's CHOM-FM on April 20, 2012, the day of its release by Cobraside Records. The single was written by Ivan Doroschuk and produced by Dave Ogilvie.
