= Folk of the 80's (Part III) =

Folk Of the 80's (Part III)

Studio album by Men Without Hats
- Released: 3 April 1984 (Canada); 21 September 1984 (Japan)
- Recorded: 1983
- Studio: Listen Audio (Montreal)
- Genre: Synth-pop
- Length: 36:38; 41:58 (2010 remaster)
- Label: MCA
- Producer: Marc Durand

Men Without Hats chronology
Rhythm of Youth (1982)	Folk Of the 80's (Part III) (1984)	Freeways (1985)

Singles from Folk of the 80's (Part III)
- 1. "Where Do the Boys Go?" Released: 1984

Professional ratings
Review scores
Source	Rating
AllMusic	link
Number One	1/5 stars

Folk of the 80's (Part III) is the second studio album by Canadian synth-pop band Men Without Hats, released on 3 April 1984 by MCA Records. The album reached No. 127 on the U.S. Billboard 200 albums chart. It was the band's final album with the line-up of Ivan Doroschuk (vocals), Stefan Doroschuk (guitar), Colin Doroschuk (keyboards) and Allan McCarthy (keyboards).

During the recording process, "The Safety Dance" became big in America, requiring the band to put recording on hold and do a tour.

This album was re-released on CD in Canada in 1997 by Oglio Records as part of a "two-fer" including Rhythm of Youth (1982).

It was also remastered and re-released in Canada in 2010 by Bulldog Brothers and Unidisc Music. In addition to the tracks on the LP, it contains an extended version of "Where Do the Boys Go?". The extended version of "Where Do the Boys Go?" was listed on the sleeve of the original CD release by Statik in 1984, but was left off the disc.

== Track listing ==
For all songs: lyrics by Ivan Doroschuk, music by Ivan Doroschuk, Colin Doroschuk, Stefan Doroschuk and Allan McCarthy

1. "No Dancing" – 2:09
2. "Unsatisfaction" – 3:15
3. "Where Do the Boys Go?" – 3:55
4. "Mother's Opinion" – 8:48 (7:48 without false fade)
5. "Eurotheme" – 2:40
6. "Messiahs Die Young" – 4:20
7. "I Know Their Name" – 3:55
8. "Folk of the 80's" – 4:17
9. "I Sing Last/Not for Tears" – 3:15

2010 remaster bonus track

1. "Where Do the Boys Go?" (extended mix) – 6:20
- On the original 1984 release and the 1997 two-fer, "Mother's Opinion" faded out, then faded back in with a flange effect, a reference to Roxy Music (one of Ivan Doroschuk's favorite bands) having done something similar with the track "In Every Dream Home a Heartache" from their second studio album, For Your Pleasure (1973). This section was removed from the 2010 remaster and did not appear on some international releases of the original LP release.

== Personnel ==
Men Without Hats

- Ivan Doroschuk – voice, electronics, guitars, percussion, piano
- Allan McCarthy – electronics, percussion, harmonica, backing vocals
- Stefan Doroschuk – guitars, electronics, backing vocals
- Colin Doroschuk – electronics, voices

Additional musicians

- Dixon Van Winkle – snare drum on "No Dancing"
- Anne Dussault – backing vocals on "Where Do the Boys Go?"
