= Pop Goes the World (song) =

1987 single by Men Without Hats

Single by Men Without Hats

from the album Pop Goes the World
- B-side: "The End (Of the World)"
- Released: October 1987
- Length: 3:43
- Label: Mercury
- Songwriter: Ivan Doroschuk
- Producers: Men Without Hats, Zeus B. Held

Men Without Hats singles chronology
"Nationale 7" (1985)	"Pop Goes the World" (1987)	"Moonbeam" (1987)

"Pop Goes the World" is a song by Canadian new wave and synth-pop band Men Without Hats. It was released in October 1987 as the lead single from their third studio album Pop Goes the World. The song reached No. 1 in Austria and Canada as well as No. 3 in South Africa. It was originally written as an electronic instrumental. The song has been inducted into the Canadian Songwriters Hall of Fame.

== Content ==
Ivan Doroschuk wrote the song as a light-hearted instrumental tune like "Popcorn" and tagged it at the end of a 10-12 track demo he sent his producer. The producer urged him to discard the other songs, put lyrics to the instrumental, and write 10-12 more songs in the same vein as the instrumental. The instrumental became "Pop Goes the World", and the other new songs turned into the rest of the album.

The song tells the story of "Johnny" and "Jenny", the two members of a musical group called "the Human Race" on their quest for fame in the industry. However, at one point the lyrics note that they come to the realization that they could make "more money on a movie screen". The members' instruments of choice vary throughout the song, though Johnny is primarily a guitarist and Jenny is a bassist.

== Music video ==
The music video for the song features lead singer Ivan Doroschuk who tells the story of "Johnny", played by guitarist Stefan Doroschuk (impersonating Elvis Presley), and "Jenny", portrayed by an unknown actress (Note: Although one source identifies the actress as Louise Court, others indicate that this appears to be a case of mistaken identity. Court had previously appeared in the band's videos for "I Like" and "Safety Dance".) playing a left-handed Höfner 500/1 bass. The two are seen dancing around a bubble-filled stage along with numerous other characters including a keyboard-playing baby and Bonhomme Carnaval (with a different hat). The word "Pop!", in writing reminiscent of a comic book, appears periodically on-screen in time with popping noises that punctuate the song. The video was released in 1988 in the CD Video format.

== Charts ==
=== Weekly charts ===
Weekly chart performance for "Pop Goes the World"
Chart (1987–1988)	Peak position
Australia (Kent Music Report)	66
Austria (Ö3 Austria Top 40)	1
Canada Retail Singles (The Record)	1
Canada Top Singles (RPM)	2
Italy Airplay (Music & Media)	6
New Zealand (Recorded Music NZ)	15
South Africa (Springbok Radio)	3
Spain (AFYVE)	11
US Billboard Hot 100	20
US 12-inch Singles Sales (Billboard)	24
US Dance Club Play (Billboard)	27

=== Year-end charts ===
1987 year-end chart performance for "Pop Goes the World"
Chart (1987)	Position
Canada Top Singles (RPM)	80

1988 year-end chart performance for "Pop Goes the World"
Chart (1988)	Position
Austria (Ö3 Austria Top 40)	25
Canada Top Singles (RPM)	42
South Africa (Springbok Radio)	15

== Certifications ==
Certifications for "Pop Goes the World"
Region	Certification	Certified units/sales
Canada (Music Canada)	Gold	50,000^{^}
^{^} Shipments figures based on certification alone.

== 2012 version ==
The song was re-recorded and released as a digital single in 2012.
