= No Hats Beyond This Point =

Studio album by Men Without Hats
- Released: November 4, 2003
- Recorded: 2002
- Genre: Synthpop
- Length: 37:03
- Label: Cloud 9 Records
- Producer: Stefan Doroschuk

Men Without Hats chronology
The Very Best of Men Without Hats (1997)	No Hats Beyond This Point (2003)	My Hats Collection (2006)

Professional ratings
Review scores
Source	Rating
Allmusic	1.5/5 stars

No Hats Beyond this Point is the sixth studio album by Canadian synthpop group Men Without Hats. Released in 2003, it was their first album in twelve years. After the release of the album, the group broke up. It was the group's third and final album to be produced by Stefan Doroschuk.

== Style and availability ==
The album's music consisted almost entirely of synthesizers, reverting to the group's previous sound.

"How Does it Feel", the fourth track on the album, dates back to 2000, having been written for Ivan Doroschuk's putative second solo album. It is considered an "underground" album, a rarity that was not released to any record stores. In 2011, however, Stefan released the album commercially on several platforms for digital streaming and download.

All instruments were played by brothers Ivan and Stefan Doroschuk, with Ivan as lead singer. Female background vocals were provided by Stefan's wife Mary-Lou Deehy, joined on one track by Stefan's daughters Mary-Lynn and Emmy-Lou Doroschuk. (Note: Mary-Lynn and Emmy-Lou Doroschuk would later form country rock band Wave 21, taking the group's name from the original name of Men Without Hats, and releasing two albums with their father Stefan as producer and later as Wave 21's bass guitarist.)

== Critical reception ==
AllMusic's David Jeffries noted the return of the band's iconic graphic symbol and synthesizer sound, in a negative review that contrasted "the wry songwriting and catchy melodies of the early days" with unsatisfying "juvenile instrumental backing" and "insipid melodies" on the new album. The review criticized the album's social commentary as excessive, "simplistic and filled with clichés," and added, "It's hard not to cringe when main man Ivan Doroschuk delivers such sophomoric lyrics so sternly."

== Track listing ==
All tracks are written by Ivan Doroschuk and Stefan Doroschuk.

No.	Title	Length
1.	"Dancing in the Moonlight"	3:44
2.	"Christina's World"	4:14
3.	"Telepathy"	3:20
4.	"How Does It Feel"	3:27
5.	"In California"	3:50
6.	"Dreaming"	3:54
7.	"Body"	3:21
8.	"Roses"	4:24
9.	"Hey Superstar"	4:31
10.	"Today Tomorrow Yesterday"	2:25

== Personnel ==
- Ivan Doroschuk – vocals, guitar, synthesizer
- Stefan Doroschuk – vocals, guitar, violin
- Emmy-Lou Doroschuk, Mary-Lynn Doroschuk – backing vocals
- Mary-Lou Deehy – backing vocals
