= Rhythm of Youth =

Studio album by Men Without Hats
- Released: April 1982
- Recorded: January–March 1982
- Studios: Listen Audio (Montreal, Quebec)
- Genres: Synth-pop; new wave
- Length: 34:05 (original Canada LP release); 36:18 (original US LP release); 42:08 (original US MC release); 53:11 (original UK CD release); 57:45 (2010 CD remaster)
- Labels: Statik (Europe); Backstreet (US); Sire/Virgin (Canada)
- Producer: Marc Durand

Men Without Hats chronology
| Folk of the 80's (1980) | Rhythm of Youth (1982) | Folk of the 80s (Part III) (1984) |

Singles from Rhythm of Youth
- 1. "I Like" Released: January 24, 1982; 2. "The Safety Dance" Released: 1982; 3. "I Got the Message" Released: May 27, 1982; 4. "Living in China" Released: July 29, 1982

Professional ratings
Review scores
| Source | Rating |
|---|---|
| AllMusic | 4.5/5 stars |
| The Village Voice | C+ |

Rhythm of Youth is the debut studio album by Canadian new wave and synth-pop band Men Without Hats, released in April 1982 by Statik Records in Europe and Canada and in 1983 by Backstreet Records in the US. It propelled them to fame with its second single, "The Safety Dance". It was released under the Statik Records label in Canada, distributed by Warner Music Canada (then called WEA Canada), where it achieved Platinum status for sales of 100,000 units. The album entered the Canadian Top 100 on the 5th of March, 1983 and reached number 15 on the 11th of June, 1983.

== Release history ==
The US releases of this album featured a different track listing, replacing "Living in China" with an edited version of "Antarctica" (the full version of which appeared on the Folk of the 80's EP) and including an extended version of "The Safety Dance".

In 1984, the album was released on CD in Europe by Statik Records, featuring Folk of the 80's (albeit including the single edit of "Antarctica") and the extended mix of "The Safety Dance" as bonus tracks. It was re-released on CD in Canada in 1997 by Oglio Records as part of a "two-fer" including Folk of the 80's (Part III) and the single edit of "Antarctica".

In 2010, the album was remastered and reissued in Canada by the band's label, Bulldog Brothers, featuring the original US track list (with "Antarctica" replaced with "Living in China") and including all the tracks from both the US and UK LP releases, plus a demo version of "Ban the Game" (known as "Ban the Game II"), an extended mix of "I Got the Message" and a club mix of "The Safety Dance".

== Critical reception ==
Cashbox called the single "I Like" "a forceful performance, grounded...on songwriter Ivan Doroschuk’s sardonic vocal" and particularly praised the production.

== Track listing ==
=== 1982 Canada/UK LP/CD ===
All tracks are written by Ivan Doroschuk unless otherwise noted.

| No. | Title | Writer(s) | Length |
|---|---|---|---|
| 1. | "Ban the Game" | | 0:48 |
| 2. | "Living in China" | | 3:04 |
| 3. | "The Great Ones Remember" | I. Doroschuk; Allan McCarthy | 4:41 |
| 4. | "I Got the Message" | | 4:44 |
| 5. | "Cocoricci (Le tango des voleurs)" | I. Doroschuk; McCarthy | 3:24 |
| 6. | "The Safety Dance" | | 2:44 |
| 7. | "Ideas for Walls" | | 2:59 |
| 8. | "Things in My Life" | I. Doroschuk; Jeremie Arrobas | 4:56 |
| 9. | "I Like" | | 4:19 |
| 10. | "The Great Ones Remember" (Reprise) | I. Doroschuk; Stefan Doroschuk | 1:59 |

1984 UK CD bonus tracks
| No. | Title | Notes | Length |
|---|---|---|---|
| 11. | "Antarctica" | Single edit | 3:29 |
| 12. | "Modern Dancing" | Also known as "Modern(e) Dancing" | 4:13 |
| 13. | "Utter Space" | | 2:45 |
| 14. | "Security (Everybody Feels Better With)" | | 4:01 |
| 15. | "The Safety Dance" (Club Mix) | Also known as "Extended Dance Version" | 4:32 |

=== 1983 US LP ===
| No. | Title | Writer(s) | Notes | Length |
|---|---|---|---|---|
| 1. | "Ban the Game" | | | 0:48 |
| 2. | "The Safety Dance" | | "Extended Dance Version" | 4:32 |
| 3. | "Antarctica" | | | 3:29 |
| 4. | "The Great Ones Remember" | I. Doroschuk; Allan McCarthy | | 4:41 |
| 5. | "I Got the Message" | | | 4:44 |
| 6. | "I Like" | | | 4:19 |
| 7. | "Ideas for Walls" | | | 2:59 |
| 8. | "Things in My Life" | I. Doroschuk; Jeremie Arrobas | | 4:56 |
| 9. | "Cocoricci (Le tango des voleurs)" | I. Doroschuk; McCarthy | | 3:24 |
| 10. | "The Great Ones Remember" (Reprise) | I. Doroschuk; Stefan Doroschuk | | 1:59 |

=== 1983 US cassette ===
| No. | Title | Writer(s) | Notes | Length |
|---|---|---|---|---|
| 1. | "Ban the Game" | | | 0:48 |
| 2. | "The Safety Dance" (Extended Dance Version) | | | 4:32 |
| 3. | "Antarctica" | | | 3:29 |
| 4. | "The Great Ones Remember" | I. Doroschuk; Allan McCarthy | | 4:41 |
| 5. | "Ideas for Walls" | | | 2:59 |
| 6. | "Living in China" | | Bonus track | 3:04 |
| 7. | "I Like" | | | 4:19 |
| 8. | "I Got the Message" | | | 4:44 |
| 9. | "Things in My Life" | I. Doroschuk; Jeremie Arrobas | | 4:56 |
| 10. | "Cocoricci (Le tango des voleurs)" | I. Doroschuk; McCarthy | | 3:24 |
| 11. | "The Safety Dance" (Short Version) | | Bonus track | 2:44 |
| 12. | "The Great Ones Remember" (Reprise) | I. Doroschuk; Stefan Doroschuk | | 1:59 |

=== 2010 Canadian CD remaster ===
| No. | Title | Writer(s) | Length |
|---|---|---|---|
| 1. | "Ban the Game" | | 0:48 |
| 2. | "The Safety Dance" | | 4:32 |
| 3. | "Living in China" | | 3:04 |
| 4. | "The Great Ones Remember" | I. Doroschuk; Allan McCarthy | 4:41 |
| 5. | "I Got the Message" | | 4:44 |
| 6. | "I Like" | | 4:19 |
| 7. | "Ideas for Walls" | | 2:59 |
| 8. | "Things in My Life" | I. Doroschuk; Jeremie Arrobas | 4:56 |
| 9. | "Cocoricci (Le tango des voleurs)" | I. Doroschuk; McCarthy | 3:24 |
| 10. | "The Great Ones Remember" (Reprise) | I. Doroschuk; Stefan Doroschuk | 1:59 |
| 11. | "Antarctica" | | 3:29 |

Bonus tracks
| No. | Title | Notes | Length |
|---|---|---|---|
| 12. | "Ban the Game" (Full Version) | | 3:49 |
| 13. | "I Got the Message" (Long Version) | | 5:57 |
| 14. | "The Safety Dance" (Video Version) | Also known as "Short Version" | 2:44 |
| 15. | "The Safety Dance" (Club Mix) | Different than "Club Mix" on original 1985 CD | 5:50 |

== Personnel ==
Musicians

- Ivan Doroschuk – vocals, guitars, piano, percussion, electronics
- Allan McCarthy – keyboards, piano, electronics, percussion
- Stefan Doroschuk – guitars, violin
- Martin Cartier – percussion
- Colin Doroschuk – additional guitars
- Anne Dussault – female vocals
- Michel Jermone – castanets
- Daniel A. Vermette – acoustic guitars

Production

- Marc Durand – producer
- Dixon Van Winkle – recording and engineering

== Charts ==
| Chart (1982) | Peak Position |
|---|---|
| Canadian Albums Chart | 15 |
| Australia (Kent Music Report) | 56 |
| US Billboard Chart | 13 |
| UK Albums Chart | 96 |
| German Albums Chart | 9 |

== Certifications ==
| Region | Certification | Certified units/sales |
|---|---|---|
| Canada (Music Canada) | 2× Platinum | 200,000^{^} |
| United States (RIAA) | Gold | 500,000^{^} |
^{^} Shipments figures based on certification alone.
