= The Safety Dance =

1982 single by Men Without Hats

Single by Men Without Hats

from the album Rhythm of Youth
- B-side: "Security" (UK); "Living in China" (US)
- Released: 1982
- Genre: New wave; synth-pop
- Length: 2:47 (single/video/original album version); 4:36 ("Extended Dance Mix"/US album version)
- Label: Statik; Sire; Backstreet; Virgin
- Songwriter: Ivan Doroschuk
- Producer: Marc Durand

Men Without Hats singles chronology
"I Like" (1982)	"The Safety Dance" (1982)	"I Got the Message" (1983)

Music video
- "The Safety Dance" on YouTube

"The Safety Dance" is a song by Canadian new wave and synth-pop band Men Without Hats, released in Canada in 1982 as the second single from Rhythm of Youth. The song was written by lead singer Ivan Doroschuk after he had been ejected from a club for pogo dancing.

The song entered the Canadian top 50 on February 19, 1983, peaking at No. 11 on May 14. In the meantime, "The Safety Dance" was released in the US on March 16, but did not enter the US chart until June 25. It became a bigger hit than in Canada, spending four weeks at No. 3 on the Billboard Hot 100 in September and October 1983. It also reached number 1 the week of October 1, 1983 on Cash Box, as well as number 1 on the Billboard Dance Chart. "The Safety Dance" found similar success in other parts of the world, entering the UK chart in August and peaking at No. 6 in early November, and entering the New Zealand chart in November, eventually peaking at No. 2 in early 1984. The song was also a massive success in South Africa, reaching No. 1 on the Springbok chart. The song has been inducted into the Canadian Songwriters Hall of Fame.

In 2021, the band released a recording of a new version of the song, reimagined as a mid-tempo ballad, under the title "No Friends of Mine." The track is included on their 2022 EP Again (Part 1).

== Meaning of the song ==
The writer and lead singer Ivan Doroschuk has explained that "The Safety Dance" is a protest against bouncers prohibiting dancers from pogoing to 1980s new wave music in clubs when disco was declining and new wave was beginning its popularity. Unlike disco dancing, which is done with partners, new wave dancing is done individually and involves holding the torso rigid while thrashing about; pogoing involves jumping up and down (the more deliberately violent evolution of pogoing is slamdancing). Clubgoers doing the newer pogo dance were perceived as posing a danger to disco dancers on the dance floor, and so club bouncers would tell pogoers to stop or be kicked out of the club. Thus, the song is a protest and a call for freedom of expression.

In 2003, on an episode of VH1's True Spin, Doroschuk responded to two common interpretations of the song. Firstly, he explained "The Safety Dance" is not a call for safe sex, and that this interpretation is "people reading into it a bit too much". Secondly, he explained that it is not an anti-nuclear protest song per se despite the nuclear imagery at the end of the video. Doroschuk stated that "it wasn't a question of just being anti-nuclear, it was a question of being anti-establishment."

== Music video ==
The music video for the song (which uses the shorter single version), directed by Tim Pope, is notable for its British folk revival imagery, featuring Morris dancers, Mummers, Punch and Judy and a maypole. It was filmed in the village of West Kington in Wiltshire, England. Ivan Doroschuk is the only member of the band actually to perform in the video. Doroschuk, and others in the video, can be seen repeatedly forming an "S" sign by jerking both arms into a stiff pose, one arm in an upward curve and the other in a downward curve, apparently referring to the first letter in "safety". The Morris dancers seen in the video were the Chippenham Town Morris Men. The little person actor is Mike Edmonds, whose T-shirt in the video shows the Rhythm of Youth album cover. The identity of the blonde-haired woman by the name of Jenny seen dancing in the video remained unknown until 2013 when she was identified as Louise Court, a journalist who was editor-in-chief at Cosmopolitan and became a director at Hearst Magazines UK in 2015.

== Charts ==
=== Weekly charts ===
Chart (1983)	Peak position
Australia (Kent Music Report)	5
Austria (Ö3 Austria Top 40)	7
Belgium (Ultratop 50 Flanders)	10
Canada Top Singles (RPM)	11
Denmark (Hitlisten)	1
France (IFOP)	64
Ireland (IRMA)	3
Netherlands (Dutch Top 40)	29
Netherlands (Single Top 100)	23
New Zealand (Recorded Music NZ)	2
Norway (VG-lista)	3
Portugal (AFP)	1
South Africa (Springbok Radio)	1
Sweden (Sverigetopplistan)	3
Switzerland (Schweizer Hitparade)	4
UK Singles (Official Charts)	6
US Billboard Hot 100	3
US Dance/Disco Top 80 (Billboard)	1
US Rock Top Tracks (Billboard)	21
US Cash Box Top 100	1
West Germany (GfK)	2

=== Year-end charts ===
Chart (1983)	Position
Australia (Kent Music Report)	23
Canada Top Singles (RPM)	77
South Africa (Springbok Radio)	11
US Billboard Hot 100	35
US Cash Box Top 100	15
West Germany (Media Control)	20

=== All-time charts ===
Chart (1964–1996)	Position
Canada Top 100 Cancon Tracks (RPM)	26

== Certifications ==
Region	Certification	Certified units/sales
Canada (Music Canada)	Gold	50,000^{^}
New Zealand (RMNZ)	Platinum	30,000^{‡}
United Kingdom (BPI)	Gold	400,000^{‡}
^{^} Shipments figures based on certification alone.^{‡} Sales+streaming figures based on certification alone.

== In popular culture ==
In 1984, "Weird Al" Yankovic released a parody of "The Safety Dance" titled "The Brady Bunch" on his album In 3-D, about The Brady Bunch TV series.

In 1996, Status Quo released a cover of the song featuring Tessa Niles on their album Don't Stop.

The song is performed in "Dream On", an episode of the TV series Glee. In the episode, wheelchair user Artie Abrams (Kevin McHale) fantasizes about being able to dance and lead a flash mob performance of the song in a shopping mall. Ivan Doroschuk credited this version with "reaching a whole other section of people" to appreciate the song.

Saturday Night Safety Dance is a 1980s-themed program on Sirius XM's 1st Wave channel.

In 2021, Angel Olsen released a cover of the song on her EP of 1980s covers Aisles.

== See also ==
- List of Cash Box Top 100 number-one singles of 1983
- List of number-one dance singles of 1983 (U.S.)
