= Men Without Hats =

Canadian synthpop and new wave band

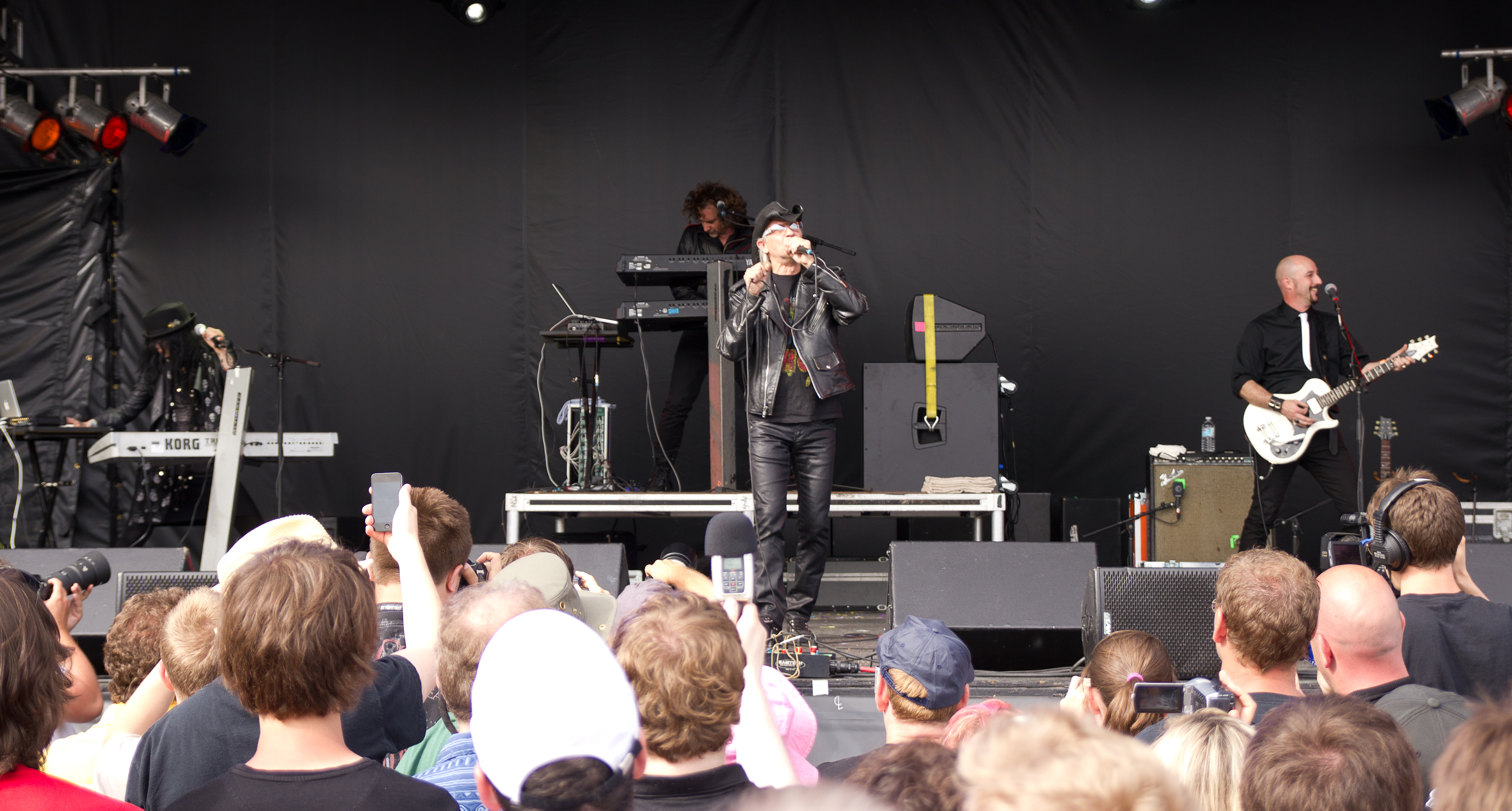
- Men Without Hats performing in 2011

Background information
- Origin: Montreal, Quebec, Canada
- Genres: New wave; synth-pop
- Years active: 1977–1993, 2002–2003, 2010–present
- Labels: Virgin; MCA; Mercury; Sire; Statik; PolyGram
- Members: Ivan Doroschuk; Sho Murray; Adrian White; Sahara Sloan
- Past members: See former members
- Website: safetydance.com

Men Without Hats are a Canadian new wave and synth-pop band, originally from Montreal, Quebec. Their music is characterized by the baritone voice of their lead singer Ivan Doroschuk, as well as their elaborate use of synthesizers and electronic processing. The band achieved their greatest popularity in the 1980s with "The Safety Dance", a worldwide top ten hit (No. 3 in the United States), and "Pop Goes the World".

After a hiatus for most of the 1990s and 2000s, Doroschuk reformed the band in 2010, and released Love in the Age of War (2012). The group, based in Vancouver, has continued to perform, including tour dates in support of their Again (Part 1) EP and Again (Part 2) LP, in 2021 and 2022, respectively.

== History ==
=== Early days ===
Men Without Hats was founded in Montreal in 1978, initially as a punk rock band featuring Ivan Doroschuk (vocals), Pete Seabrooke (guitar), Dave Hill (bass), and John Gurrin (drums). In 1980, Doroschuk restarted Men Without Hats, giving the name to a new synthesizer-based group that he formed with Jérémie Arrobas (vocals, keyboards) and his brothers Stefan Doroschuk (bass) and Colin Doroschuk (guitar). Influences on this electronic outfit included Gary Numan, OMD, and Ultravox. Years earlier, while in high school, Arrobas and the Doroschuk brothers had played together in a short-lived band called Wave 21, along with drummer Igor Krichevsky. Many years later, Stefan would re-use the Wave 21 name for a country-pop band founded in the late 2010s with his daughters Mary-Lynn and Emmy-Lou.

The Doroschuk brothers, all three of whom are classically trained musicians, were born in Urbana, Illinois while their father, a Canadian, was earning a doctoral degree at the University of Illinois. They moved to Montreal as young children when their parents returned to Canada. The group's name came about because the brothers, following a self-described principle of "style before comfort", refused to wear hats during Montreal's cold winters, calling themselves "the men without hats".

In addition to the Doroschuks, the group has also included numerous additional members and guest or touring performers, many of whom quickly came and left during the first five years. Frontman and songwriter Ivan Doroschuk was the only constant member, while Stefan and Colin Doroschuk as well as Arrobas remained as relatively steady members through the early 1980s.

Their first recording to be released was the 1980 EP Folk of the 80's. At this point, the band had changed styles from punk to new wave and officially consisted of Ivan (vocals, bass) and Arrobas (keyboards); also appearing on the EP were auxiliary members Stefan Doroschuk (bass), Roman Martyn (guitars), and Lysanne Thibodeau (backing vocals).

Shortly after the release of the debut EP, Martyn left and was replaced by Jean-Marc Pisapia, who stayed only a short time before leaving, and later founded The Box. Pisapia was replaced briefly by Tracy Howe, who also left in short order, co-founding Rational Youth shortly after his departure. Howe was replaced by keyboardist Mike Gabriel. Arrobas and Gabriel left the group just before the recording of the next album.

=== International success ===
Ivan and Stefan subsequently recruited Allan McCarthy (percussion, electronics) to join the group, and recorded their 1982 full-length debut album Rhythm of Youth. With the addition of Colin Doroschuk, guitar synth and background vocals on the album, the quartet subsequently enjoyed a hit in Canada with "The Safety Dance", which peaked at No. 11 in May 1983. The song soon charted in the United States, spending four weeks at No. 3 on the Billboard Hot 100, and was a major hit on the UK Singles Chart, peaking at No. 6. The song also reached the top ten in various other European countries, and peaked at No. 2 in New Zealand and No. 1 in South Africa, where it was the 11th highest-selling single of 1983.

Men Without Hats then released the album Folk of the 80's (Part III) in 1984. While lead single "Where Do The Boys Go?" was a top 40 hit in Canada, the album failed to match the international success of Rhythm of Youth.

In 1985, the band released the EP Freeways, consisting of multiple (and multilingual) remixes of one of their earliest efforts, Ivan and Arrobas's 1980 song "Freeways" (which had previously been released as a B-side in 1982). To support the EP, the group undertook a related tour, footage from which would later (in 2006) be released on DVD as Live Hats.

Reshuffling the lineup again, the band released the album Pop Goes the World in 1987 with Ivan, Stefan, and Lenny Pinkas. The song "Pop Goes the World" reached No. 20 on the Billboard Hot 100, No. 2 on the Canadian Singles Chart, and was No. 1 in Austria. The song was featured in the 1987 film Date with an Angel, and became the fifteenth biggest selling single in South Africa for 1988.

The group's next album, The Adventures of Women & Men Without Hate in the 21st Century, released in 1989, featured a cover of ABBA's song "SOS". The musicians on the album were essentially the touring band from Pop Goes the World, which included Bruce Murphy on keyboards and guitar, Marika Tjelios on bass, Richard Sampson on drums, and Heidi Garcia on vocals and keyboards.

The 1991 album Sideways, dominated by electric guitars instead of keyboards, revealed a dramatically different sound for the band, based in part on Ivan's exposure to Nirvana. Ivan said "We had a contractual obligation for one more album with PolyGram so I said to them, we'll take half of the allotted budget if they would allow us to do the record I wanted...so we did this guitar-oriented record but PolyGram were horrified. 'Men Without Hats without keyboards aren't going to work,' they claimed and that was the end of the story with PolyGram." The lineup on the album was Ivan on vocals, Félix Matte on lead guitar, John Kastner on rhythm guitar, Stefan on bass, Michel Langevin on drums and Colin on keyboards and lead guitar.

The group officially disbanded in 1993, after the career setback of failing to attract another American label as a result of the negative reception to Sideways. The band's final concert was a benefit to support a women's shelter in Montreal, with guitarist Denis D'Amour of Voivod replacing Matte and Kastner, who both had left the band in 1992.

They had 7 songs in the Canadian top 50 and 3 in the US top 100.

=== Projects during the 1990s and 2000s ===
After disbanding, lead singer Ivan and keyboardist Bruce Murphy went on to record several demos in 1993 for a concept album tentatively titled UFO's Are Real, which was never released. Ivan recorded and released the solo album The Spell in 1997. Former band member Allan McCarthy died due to AIDS complications in 1995. Under the name MacKenzie-Parker Gang, Stefan and Mack MacKenzie (of the Canadian alt-country band Three O'Clock Train) released Ride for Glory (1999), a post-modern Western-themed album.

After a 10-year hiatus, No Hats Beyond This Point was released in November 2003, returning the band to their early new wave style. In interviews around the time of the release, the band had mentioned a tour to support the release and a box set dedicated to the band's early years, which included the Folk of the 80's and Freeways EPs, the band's first two albums, a concert that was televised in 1985, unreleased demos and remixes of "The Safety Dance". None of this came to fruition, though, and the band split up once again in early 2004. This was the end of Stefan's involvement with Men Without Hats.

Colin released two albums with his side solo project "Centrifugal Force" ["Matter", "Excerpts from Matter"], then focused on opera and classical music, first serving as Artistic Director of Montreal's Northern Opera Theatre (85-91) and later as composer-in-residence at British Columbia's Ballet Victoria. His works include the ballets "Peter Pan", "Alice in Wonderland", operas "Medea Metamorphoses", an opera-dance project with the Victoria Symphony & the Coast-Saalish First Nation dancers "Heaven"; A full production of his opera Evangeline, based on a Longfellow poem, was produced by L'Opera de Rimouski in 2014, and was conducted by Doroschuk.

In 2006, the Trilogie Musique label released a DVD titled Live Hats, featuring a 1985 live concert at Le Spectrum theater in Montreal on August 8, 1985 that had been televised. The release was unauthorized by the band, and it was pulled out of print.

=== Reformation in 2010–present ===
Ivan Doroschuk reformed Men Without Hats in 2010 as the frontman and lead vocalist, and was joined by musicians Derek Mansfield (synths), James Love (guitar), and Lou Dawson (synths). The band returned on September 24, 2010, at the Rifflandia Music Festival in Victoria, British Columbia, performing ten songs and hits from the Men Without Hats back catalogue. The revived band was described by the Austin American-Statesman as "simply singer Ivan Doroschuk and hired guns" and by Stefan as a "tribute band". Despite these initial reactions, the band's Dance If You Want Tour opened in March 2011 with a well-attended and positively received performance at Austin's South by Southwest event.

In June 2011, Doroschuk told a festival audience that the group would record a new studio album, announcing the news at North by Northeast in Toronto. The album was originally to be titled Folk of the 80's (Part IV), but in March 2012, the band posted on Facebook that it would be called Love in the Age of War and would be released that summer.

Love in the Age of War, produced by Dave Ogilvie of Skinny Puppy, was released in June 2012 and received mostly favorable reviews. Ogilvie and Doroschuk set out to faithfully reproduce and update the group's classic synthesizer sound of the 1980s, intentionally making a follow-up album to 1982's Rhythm of Youth. According to Doroschuk, they pretended to be "working on a 24-track machine, for example, and not the virtual, infinity-plus-one number of tracks that you can get today. We went out and got the old synths that we used back then... the identical instruments, so it wasn't soft synths, it was really real synthesizers."

By 2011, Doroschuk had taken on three of his touring musicians as full band members: James Love on guitar and backing vocals, Louise (Lou) Dawson on keyboards and backing vocals, and Mark Olexson on keyboards and backing vocals, all of whom performed on Love in the Age of War. Colin Doroschuk also appeared on the album as a vocalist. After the album was recorded, Doroschuk doubled down on the band's synthesizer-heavy sound by replacing Olexson with Vancouver musician Rachel Ashmore on keyboards and backing vocals, as the group's second synthesist.

Men Without Hats again toured the United States in 2013, as part of the 1980s-themed Regeneration Tour, with contemporaries such as Howard Jones, Andy Bell of Erasure, and Berlin. The band's continuing activity has included tours in Europe in 2015 and 2016.

As part of a Totally '80s show that toured Australia in July 2016, Doroschuk performed as Men Without Hats without other band members, "singing with the house band...[to] set the stage for a proper visit with the full band". This would not eventuate for another eleven years, however. In October 2016, prior to a European tour, Sho Murray replaced Love as guitarist.

On January 28, 2020, Doroschuk announced that he was working on a follow-up to Love in the Age of War, to be titled Again (Parts 1 and 2). A new lineup of the band recorded the two studio albums in Vancouver between July 2020 and January 2021, to be released separately in 2021 and 2022 on the band's new label, Sonic Envy. Twelve new original songs were recorded for Again (Part 2), which included "Heaven", a song written in 1985 and performed on the Freeways tour but never recorded in the studio. The five-song Again (Part 1) EP includes a collection of cover songs and a "re-invention" of "Safety Dance" titled "No Friends of Mine". The band announced tour dates beginning in June 2021, with a lineup consisting of Ivan on lead vocals and electronics, Colin Doroschuk on vocals, guitar and keyboards, and Sho Murray on guitar. Colin's daughter, soprano Sahara Sloan, provided additional vocals on the recording.

In 2024, Men Without Hats toured as part of the Abducted by the 80's tour across the US and Canada with fellow 1980s acts Wang Chung, the Motels, and Naked Eyes, as well as the Totally Tubular Festival with Tom Bailey, Thomas Dolby, and others.

On November 14, 2025, Men Without Hats released a new album called On The Moon. The album included "I Love The 80s", released in June as a single, and a cover of John Lennon's "Jealous Guy".

Former bass guitarist Al Gunn died on April 8, 2026, aged 65.

On 28 September 2026, the band announced its first Australian tour, to take place between May and June 2027.

== Band members ==
=== Current ===
- Ivan Doroschuk – vocals, guitar, bass, keyboards, synths, drum programming (1977–1993, 2002–2003, 2010–present)
- Sho Murray – guitar (2016–present)
- Adrian White – drums (2018–present)
- Sahara Sloan – vocals, keyboards (2023–present)

=== Former ===
This listing may include a number of touring and session musicians for whom actual membership in the band cannot be confirmed.

- Pete Seabrooke – guitar (1977–1979)
- Dave Hill – bass (1977–1979)
- John Gurrin – drums (1977–1979)
- Stefan Doroschuk – vocals, guitar, violin, bass, keyboards (1979–1993, 2002–2003)
- Colin Doroschuk – vocals, keyboards, guitar, bass (1979–1986, 1990–1993, 2020–2023)
- Jérémie Arrobas – keyboards, drums (1979–1980)
- Lysanne Thibodeau – backing vocals (1980)
- Roman Martyn – guitar (1980)
- Jean-Marc Pisapia – guitar, vocals (1980)
- Tracy Howe – guitar (1980)
- Pierre Taillefer – keyboards (1980–1982)
- Allan McCarthy – keyboards (1981–1986; died 1995)
- Al Gunn – bass (1984–1986; died 2026)
- Denis Toupin – drums (1984–1986)
- Lenny Pinkas – keyboards (1984–1990)
- Bruce Murphy – keyboards, guitar, backing vocals (1986–1994)
- Marika Tjelios – bass, backing vocals (1986–1990)
- Richard Samson – drums (1986–1990)
- Heidi Garcia – keyboards, vocals (1986–1990)
- Félix Matte – lead guitar (1990–1993)
- John Kastner – rhythm guitar (1990–1993)
- Michel Langevin – drums (1990–1993)
- Johnny Souranis (Sideways Live Tour) – bass, guitar (1992)
- Derek Mansfield – synths, programming (2009–2010)
- Mark Olexson – keyboards (2010–2012)
- James Love – guitar, bass (2010–2016)
- Louise Dawson – keyboards (2010–2020)
- Rachel Ashmore – keyboards (2012–2020)

== Discography ==
=== Studio albums ===
- Rhythm of Youth (1982)
- Folk of the 80's (Part III) (1984)
- Pop Goes the World (1987)
- The Adventures of Women & Men Without Hate in the 21st Century (1989)
- Sideways (1991)
- No Hats Beyond This Point (2003)
- Love in the Age of War (2012)
- Again, Part 2 (2022)
- Men Without Hats - Live (2025)
- On the Moon (2025)
