= Ivan Doroschuk =

Canadian musician

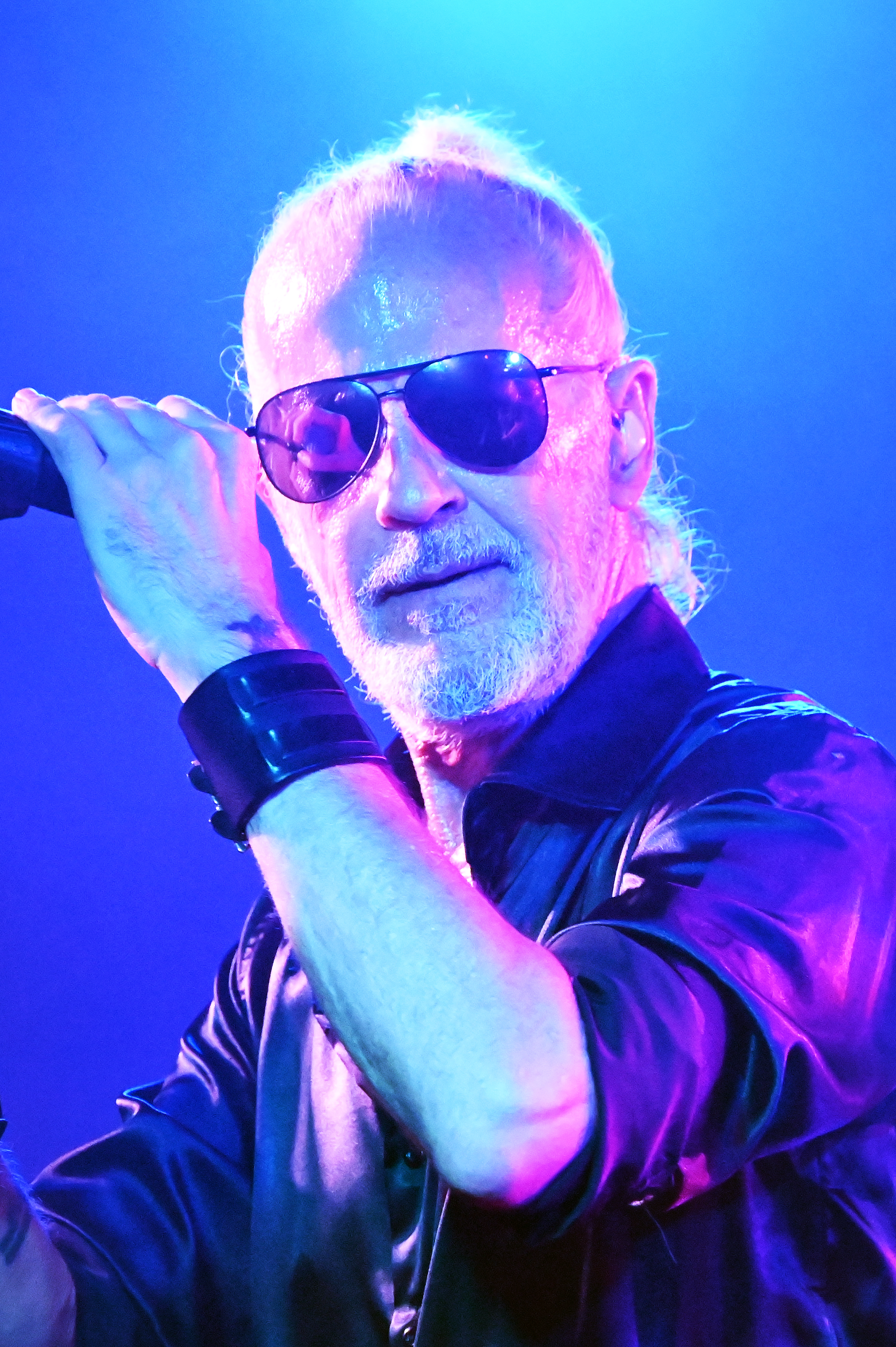
- Doroschuk performing in 2025

Background information
- Born: Ivan Eugene Doroschuk; 9 October 1957 (age 69); Champaign, Illinois, U.S.
- Origin: Montreal, Quebec, Canada
- Genres: New wave; synth-pop
- Occupations: Singer; songwriter; musician
- Instruments: Vocals; guitar; bass guitar; drums; keyboards; synthesizers
- Years active: 1977–2004; 2010–present
- Member of: Men Without Hats
- Website: safetydance.com

Ivan Eugene Doroschuk (/ˈdɒrəstʃʌk, ˈdɒrəʃʌk/, French pronunciation: [ivɑ̃ øʒɛn dɔʁɔʃyk]) (born 9 October 1957) is an American-born Canadian singer, songwriter and musician. He is the lead vocalist and founding member of the new wave and synth-pop band Men Without Hats, best known for their songs "The Safety Dance" (1982) and "Pop Goes the World" (1987).

== Early life ==
Ivan Doroschuk was born on 9 October 1957 in Champaign, Illinois, to Ukrainian-Canadian parents Eugene and Betty Doroschuk.

Doroschuk and his younger brothers Stefan and Colin were born in the United States while their father was pursuing a doctorate at the University of Illinois at Urbana–Champaign. Eugene Doroschuk received his PhD in 1962, and accepted a teaching position at the Université de Montréal. Betty Doroschuk became a member of the music faculty at Montreal's McGill University, teaching classical voice. The three brothers, all classically trained musicians, grew up in the Montreal borough of Snowdon.

In 1976, at the age of 18, Doroschuk briefly studied law in the south of France, returning to Montreal in 1977. At McGill University, he was a student in the Film and Communications program.

== Musical career ==
Doroschuk formed the Canadian new wave/synthpop group Men Without Hats in 1978, earning worldwide success with "The Safety Dance" in 1983 and "Pop Goes the World" in 1987. Men Without Hats started out as a new wave band, but the band's sound changed throughout the 1980s, adding more rock influence and transitioning to hard rock by the end of 1990.

In 1997, recording under the name Ivan, he released a solo album, The Spell, followed by a 1999 tour to promote the album.

Doroschuk provided the music for the 1997 TV movie "Platinum" and for the 1998 made-for-television science fiction films "Universal Soldier II: Brothers in Arms" and "Universal Soldier III: Unfinished Business" (with his name misspelled in the credits of both, lacking the letter "s").

Doroschuk attempted to revive Men Without Hats in 2003 with his release of the band's comeback album No Hats Beyond This Point, but did not reform the group for a tour or live performances. The studio album used material originally intended for Doroschuk's unreleased second solo album Mote in God's Eye. Apart from a 2003 interview on VH1's True Spin, and a 2008 SOCAN Awards Gala where he was presented with an award for "The Safety Dance", Doroschuk made few public appearances during the 2000s.

In 2010, a full revival and reformation of the group Men Without Hats took place, with Doroschuk recruiting three new members. In 2012, they released the album Love in the Age of War, in which Doroschuk returned the band to its early-1980s synthpop sound by creating an intentional follow-up album to 1982's Rhythm of Youth.

== Personal life ==
Doroschuk married in the late 1990s but later divorced. He has one son and was a stay-at-home father before reforming Men Without Hats. He resides in Victoria, British Columbia.
