= Australian Crawl discography =

- Studio albums: 4
- Extended plays: 1
- Live albums: 3
- Compilation albums: 7
- Singles: 17
- Video albums: 3

Australian Crawl was an Australian surf / pop rock band. The band released four studio albums, three live albums, six compilations, seventeen singles, one extended play, and three video albums. These include releases credited to Australian Crawl, Australian Crawl and James Reyne (but not his solo material), and 'Members of Australian Crawl'. The band was founded by James Reyne (lead vocals/piano), his younger brother David Reyne (drums), Brad Robinson (rhythm guitar), Paul Williams (bass guitar) and Simon Binks (lead guitar) in 1978. David Reyne left in 1979 and was replaced by Bill McDonough (drums, percussion), and in October 1980 the band was joined by his younger brother Guy McDonough (vocals, rhythm guitar). In 1979, Australian Crawl recorded their first single, "Beautiful People", produced by Little River Band's guitarist David Briggs. Briggs helped them gain a recording contract with EMI Records; he also produced their debut album The Boys Light Up in 1980, which peaked at number four on the Australian Kent Music Report album charts and remained on the charts for 101 consecutive weeks from 1981 to 1982.

The band's second album, Sirocco, was released in 1981 and achieved number one on the albums charts. On the 1981 Australian End of Year Album Charts, Sirocco is number two, behind Double Fantasy by John Lennon and ahead of AC/DC's Back in Black, making it the best-charting album by an Australian act for the year. Their third album, Sons of Beaches, was released in 1982; it also reached number one. Bill McDonough left before they recorded their extended play, Semantics, in 1983, which achieved number one on the Kent Music Report singles chart. Bill McDonough was replaced on drums, temporarily by Graham Bidstrup and permanently by John Watson. Semantics contained the track "Reckless (Don't Be So)", which is described as a number one-single in Music Australia's profile on James Reyne. The live album Phalanx was a stop-gap measure between studio albums; nevertheless, it reached number four on the albums charts during December 1983. In early 1984, the band signed with Geffen Records for international release of their material.

In 1984, the band released the best of their early material as a compilation titled Crawl File, which peaked at number two on the albums charts. Geffen released Semantics, internationally, as a long play album with six newly re-recorded tracks compiled from their first three studio albums. Promotion of the album and the subsequent tour was stalled when Guy McDonough died in June of viral pneumonia. Before Guy's death, he had recorded demos with his brother Bill McDonough, and ex-members of their earlier band, The Flatheads. Bill McDonough assembled the tapes and produced Guy McDonough's posthumous album My Place on Wheatley Records in April 1985. Tracks from these sessions were re-mastered and released on Lost & Found in 1996, credited under the 'Members of Australian Crawl' name. Meanwhile, remaining Australian Crawl members had recorded their fourth studio album, Between a Rock and a Hard Place, which was released in 1985 and achieved number 11 on the albums charts. This was followed by the announcement that they would disband after another tour. The live album, The Final Wave recorded their performance on 27 January 1986; it was released in October and peaked at number 16 on the albums charts.

Australian Crawl were inducted into the Australian Recording Industry Association (ARIA) Hall of Fame on 30 September 1996. Two weeks later, on 13 October 1996, Robinson died of lymphoma. After Lost & Found, another compilation was released, More Wharf: Their Greatest Hits in 1998. This was followed by the compilation Reckless: 1979–1995, released in 2000 and credited to Australian Crawl and James Reyne. This was followed by the compilation Australian Crawl and James Reyne: The Definitive Collection, released in 2002.

== Albums ==
=== Studio albums ===
List of albums, with selected chart positions and certifications
Title	Album details	Peak chart positions		Certifications
Title	Album details	AUS	NZ	Certifications
The Boys Light Up	Released: April 1980; Label: EMI (EMX102); Format: LP	4	14	ARIA: 4× Platinum
Sirocco	Released: July 1981; Label: EMI (EMX108); Format: LP	1	—	ARIA: 4× Platinum
Sons of Beaches	Released: July 1982; Label: EMI (EMI 3423); Format: LP	1	29	ARIA: 2× Platinum
Between a Rock and a Hard Place	Released: July 1985; Label: EMI, Freestyle (SFL1-0134); Format: LP	11	—	
"—" denotes releases that did not chart and/or did not receive certification.

=== Live albums ===
List of albums, with selected chart positions and certifications
Title	Album details	Peak chart positions	
Title	Album details	AUS	NZ
Phalanx	Released: December 1983; Label: EMI (EMI P-4000); Format: LP	4	13
The Final Wave	Released: September 1986; Label: EMI, Freestyle (SFL1-0142); Format: LP	16	—
Live at Billboard 1981	Released: 1 July 2020; Label: Australian Crawl, Black Box, MGM Distribution; Format: CD (limited), DD, streaming	—	—
"—" denotes releases that did not chart.

=== Compilation albums ===
List of albums, with selected chart positions and certifications
Title	Album details	Peak chart positions	Certifications
Title	Album details	AUS	Certifications
Semantics (Note: Semantics was released as a four-track EP in 1983 in Australia. It peaked at number 1 on the Australian Kent Music Report singles chart - there was no separate EP chart. The track, "Reckless (Don't Be So)", was the main one played on radio stations. Some sources describe "Reckless" as a number 1 single. Semantics was released by Geffen Records as a ten-track LP in 1984 for the international markets, by the addition of six re-recorded tracks from their first three studio albums.)	Released: 1983; Label: Geffen (GHS 4028); Format: LP	—N/a	
Crawl File	Released: November 1984; Label: EMI (EMC245); Format: CD, LP	2	
Lost & Found (Note: Lost & Found is credited to 'Members of Australian Crawl'. Seven tracks on this album had originally appeared on Australian Crawl's guitarist and songwriter Guy McDonough's posthumously released solo album, My Place in 1985. Both My Place and Lost & Found were produced by Bill McDonough (ex-Australian Crawl drummer and percussionist), Guy's older brother.)	Released: 1996; Label: EMI, Global (GRCD 0001); Format: CD	—	
More Wharf: Greatest Hits	Released: 16 October 1998; Label: Virgin, EMI (EMI 4973272); Format: CD	—	
Reckless: 1979–1995 (Note: Reckless: 1979–1995 and Australian Crawl and James Reyne: The Definitive Collection are credited to both Australian Crawl and to James Reyne. They contain material from Australian Crawl's performances, and James Reyne's subsequent solo performances.)	Released: 26 May 2000; Label: EMI, Raven (RVCD-83); Format: CD	—	
The Definitive Collection	Released: 14 October 2002; Label: EMI (5423512); Format: 2CD	—	
The Greatest Hits	Released: 24 January 2014; Label: Universal (3766933); Format: CD	4	ARIA: Platinum
"—" denotes releases that did not chart.

=== Video albums ===
List of video albums, with selected details
Title	Video details
The Crawl Video File	Released: 1985; Label: EMI; Format: VHS
More Wharf: Their Greatest Video Hits	Released: 9 November 1998; Label: EMI 152302 (EMIVIDEO); Format: VHS
Australian Crawl and James Reyne: The Definitive Collection (Note: Australian Crawl and James Reyne: The Definitive Collection was a 2 disc DVD; the first disc featured 15 video clips of Australian Crawl songs, two live appearances, two television appearances and a number of extras including a rare recorded performance by Spiff Rouch (the earliest incarnation of Australian Crawl). The second disc features videos and live recordings of James Reyne, as a solo artist.)	Released: May 2004 (Note: The DVD was pulled from shelves by the distributor shortly after its release.); Label: EMI 724359 9292 9 3; Format: 2DVD

== Extended plays ==
List of EPs, with selected chart positions and certifications
Title	Album details	Peak chart positions	Certifications
Title	Album details	AUS	Certifications
Semantics	Released: 10 October 1983; Label: EMI (BUG-3); Format: 12" vinyl	1	ARIA: Gold

== Singles ==
List of singles, with selected chart positions
Year	Title	Peak chart positions		Certifications	Album
Year	Title	AUS	NZ	Certifications	Album
1979	"Beautiful People"	22	—		The Boys Light Up
1980	"The Boys Light Up"	22	—	RMNZ: 2× Platinum	The Boys Light Up
1980	"Downhearted"	12	25	RMNZ: Gold	The Boys Light Up
1981	"Things Don't Seem"	11	—		Sirocco
1981	"Errol"	18	—		Sirocco
1981	"Oh No Not You Again"	58	—	RMNZ: Gold	Sirocco
1982	"Shut Down"	17	—		Sons of Beaches
1982	"Daughters of the Northern Coast"	76	—		Sons of Beaches
1982	"Runaway Girls"	88	—		Sons of Beaches
1983	"Reckless (Don't Be So)"	1	8	RMNZ: 2× Platinum	Semantics EP
1984	"Louie Louie"	81	—		Phalanx
1984	"Unpublished Critics"	—	—		Crawl File
1985	"Two Can Play"	44	—		Between a Rock and a Hard Place
1985	"If This Is Love"	87	—		Between a Rock and a Hard Place
1985	"Trouble Spot Rock"	69	—		Between a Rock and a Hard Place
1986	"Two Hearts"	—	—		Between a Rock and a Hard Place
"—" denotes releases that did not chart.

== Other appearances ==
Year	Song contributed	Album
1982	"Six Days on the Road" (Dave Dudley cover)	Rocking Australia Live
1982	"Unpublished Critics" (live version)	Rocking Australia Live
