= The Greatest Hits (Australian Crawl album) =

Compilation album by Australian Crawl
- Released: 24 January 2014
- Recorded: 1979–1986
- Genre: Rock
- Label: Universal Music Australia

Australian Crawl chronology
The Definitive Collection (2002)	The Greatest Hits (2014)

The Greatest Hits is a compilation album of songs by the Australian rock band Australian Crawl, taken from their four studio albums (The Boys Light Up, Sirocco, Sons of Beaches and Between a Rock and a Hard Place) and their EP, Semantics.

The Greatest Hits peaked at number 4 on the ARIA Charts and was certified platinum in November 2019. The album was released on vinyl in 2016, with a bonus live track.

== Track listing ==
No.	Title	Writer(s)	Album	Length
1.	"Beautiful People"	Mark Hudson; James Reyne	The Boys Light Up	2:54
2.	"The Boys Light Up"	J. Reyne	The Boys Light Up	4:40
3.	"Downhearted"	Sean Higgins; Bill McDonough; Guy McDonough	The Boys Light Up	4:10
4.	"Hoochie Gucci Fiorucci Mama"	David Briggs; J. Reyne	The Boys Light Up	2:30
5.	"Indisposed"	B. McDonough; G. McDonough; Brad Robinson; J. Reyne	The Boys Light Up	4:03
6.	"Things Don't Seem"	Higgins; G. McDonough	Sirocco	3:57
7.	"Errol"	G. McDonough; J. Reyne	Sirocco	3:30
8.	"Oh No Not You Again"	G. McDonough; Walker	Sirocco	5:07
9.	"Lakeside"	Reyne	Sirocco	4:49
10.	"Unpublished Critics"	J. Reyne; Paul Williams)	Sirocco	5:15
11.	"Easy On Your Own"	Kerry Armstrong; Simon Binks; Robinson	Sirocco	3:49
12.	"Shut Down"	B. McDonough	Sons of Beaches	4:07
13.	"Daughters of the Northern Coast"	G. McDonough; J. Reyne	Sons of Beaches	4:38
14.	"Runaway Girls"	G. McDonough	Sons of Beaches	4:04
15.	"Waiting"	B. McDonough; G. McDonough	Sons of Beaches	3:51
16.	"Reckless (Don't Be So)"	J. Reyne	Semantics	3:16
17.	"White Limbo"	Binks	Semantics	4:03
18.	"Two Can Play"	Simon Hussey; J. Reyne	Between a Rock and a Hard Place	3:49
19.	"Trouble Spot Rock"	J. Reyne	Between a Rock and a Hard Place	4:45
20.	"Louis Louis (live) " (Vinyl only bonus track)	Richard Berry	Phalanx	2:50

== Charts ==
=== Weekly charts ===
Chart (2014)	Peak position
Australian Albums (ARIA)	4

=== Year-end charts ===
Chart (2014)	Position
Australian Artist Albums Chart	40
Chart (2019)	Position
Australian Artist Albums (ARIA)	31
Chart (2020)	Position
Australian Artist Albums (ARIA)	26
Chart (2021)	Position
Australian Artist Albums (ARIA)	15
Chart (2022)	Position
Australian Artist Albums (ARIA)	12
Chart (2023)	Position
Australian Artist Albums (ARIA)	9

== Certifications ==
Region	Certification	Certified units/sales
Australia (ARIA)	Platinum	70,000^{‡}
^{‡} Sales+streaming figures based on certification alone.

== Release history ==
Region	Date	Format	Label	Catalogue
Australia	24 January 2014	Digital download, Compact Disc	Universal Music Australia	3766933
Australia	16 May 2016	2x Vinyl	Universal Music Australia	3775598
