= More Wharf =

More Wharf: Greatest Hits

Compilation album by Australian Crawl
- Released: 16 October 1998
- Genre: Rock
- Label: EMI Music Australia

Australian Crawl chronology
Lost & Found (1996)	More Wharf: Greatest Hits (1998)	Reckless: 1979-1995 (2000)

More Wharf: Greatest Hits is a compilation album of songs by Australian rock band Australian Crawl taken from their four studio albums (The Boys Light Up, Sirocco, Sons of Beaches, and Between a Rock and a Hard Place) and their EP, Semantics.

The album is dedicated to the band's rhythm guitarist, Brad Robinson who died of lymphoma in 1996.

The album features a slightly different mix of Reckless (Don't Be So), with the bass being more audible and more guitar added in the last section of the song. This version is only available on this compilation.

== Track listing ==
1. "Beautiful People" (James Reyne, Mark Hudson) – 2:56
2. "The Boys Light Up (Reyne) – 4:41
3. "Downhearted" (Sean Higgins, Guy McDonough, William 'Bill' McDonough) – 2:56
4. "Hoochie Gucci Fiorucci Mama" (Reyne, David Briggs)
5. "Indisposed" (Brad Robinson, James Robinson, Reyne, W McDonough) – 4:04
6. "Things Don't Seem" (G McDonough, Higgins) – 3:57
7. "Errol" (Reyne, G McDonough) – 3:30
8. "Oh No Not You Again" (G McDonough) – 5:08
9. "Lakeside" (Reyne) – 4:49
10. "Shut Down" (W McDonough) – 4:11
11. "Daughters of the Northern Coast" (Reyne, G McDonough) – 4:42
12. "Reckless (Don't Be So)" (Reyne) – 5:23
13. "White Limbo" (Simon Binks) – 4:04
14. "Two Can Play" (Simon Hussey, Reyne) – 3:48
15. "Trouble Spot Rock" (Reyne) – 4:46
16. "Always the Way" (Hussey, Reyne) – 5:37
17. "Unpublished Critics" (Reyne, Paul Williams) – 5:20

Songwriting credits from Australasian Performing Right Association (APRA).
