= Crawl File =

Compilation album by Australian Crawl
- Released: November 1984
- Genre: Rock
- Length: 56:44
- Label: EMI Music Australia
- Producers: David Briggs, Peter Dawkins, Mike Chapman, Mark Opitz

Australian Crawl chronology
Phalanx (1983)	Crawl File (1984)	Between a Rock and a Hard Place (1986)

Professional ratings
Review scores
Source	Rating
Allmusic	4.5/5 stars

Crawl File is the first compilation album of songs released by Australian rock band Australian Crawl. The songs were taken from their first three studio albums The Boys Light Up, Sirocco, and Sons of Beaches together with their EP, Semantics. The album was released in November 1984 on cassette and vinyl initially. In 1985 it was issued on CD. Then re-released again on CD in 1994. It was re-released on vinyl in October 2023.

== Track listing ==
No.	Title	Writer(s)	Original Album	Length
1.	"Beautiful People"	James Reyne	The Boys Light Up	2:56
2.	"Indisposed"	Guy McDonough, Reyne, Brad Robinson	The Boys Light Up	4:04
3.	"Errol"	G. McDonough, Reyne	Sirocco	3:30
4.	"Shutdown"	Bill McDonough	Sons of Beaches	4:11
5.	"Oh No Not You Again"	G. McDonough	Sirocco	5:08
6.	"Lakeside"	Reyne	Sirocco	4:49
7.	"Downhearted"	G. McDonough, B. McDonough, Sean Higgins	The Boys Light Up	3:09
8.	"Things Don't Seem"	G. McDonough, Higgins	Sirocco	4:00
9.	"Unpublished Critics"	Reyne, Paul Williams	Sirocco	5:20
10.	"White Limbo"	Simon Binks	Semantics	4:07
11.	"Letter from Zimbabwe"	Reyne	Sons of Beaches	2:49
12.	"Reckless (Don't You Be So...)"	Reyne	Semantics	5:27
13.	"Hoochie Gucci Fiorucci Mama"	Reyne, David Briggs	The Boys Light Up	2:33
14.	"The Boys Light Up"	Reyne	The Boys Light Up	4:41
Total length:				56:44

== Charts ==
Chart (1984/85)	Peak position
Australian (Kent Music Report)	2
