= Reckless: 1979–1995 =

Compilation album by Australian Crawl / James Reyne
- Released: 26 May 2000
- Genre: Rock
- Label: Raven Records

Australian Crawl albums chronology
| More Wharf: Their Greatest Hits (1998) | Reckless: 1979–1995 (2000) | The Definitive Collection (2002) |

James Reyne chronology
| Design for Living (1999) | Reckless: 1979–1995 (2000) | The Definitive Collection (2002) |

Professional ratings
Review scores
| Source | Rating |
|---|---|
| Allmusic | 4/5 stars |

Reckless: 1979–1995 is a compilation album of songs by Australian rock band Australian Crawl and the band's lead singer, James Reyne, from his solo career. It was released in May 2000 by Raven Records, and included a twelve-page colour booklet with extensive liner notes and various images.

== Track listing ==
1. "Beautiful People" (James Reyne, Mark Hudson) – 2:53
2. "The Boys Light Up" (James Reyne) – 4:39
3. "Downhearted" (Sean Higgins, Guy McDonough, William 'Bill' McDonough) – 3:06
4. "Hoochie Gucci Fiorucci Mama" (James Reyne, David Briggs) – 2:28
5. "Indisposed" (Brad Robinson, James Robinson, James Reyne, William McDonough) – 4:02
6. "Errol" (James Reyne, Guy McDonough) – 3:30
7. "Things Don't Seem" (Guy McDonough, Sean Higgins) – 3:57
8. "Shut Down" (William McDonough) – 4:06
9. "Reckless (Don't Be So)" (James Reyne) – 5:22
10. "Daughters of the Northern Coast" (James Reyne, Guy McDonough) – 4:41
11. "Fall of Rome" (James Reyne) – 4:57
12. "Hammerhead" (James Reyne, Simon Hussey) – 4:46
13. "Motor's Too Fast" (James Reyne, Simon Hussey) – 4:12
14. "House of Cards" (James Reyne, Simon Hussey) – 4:27
15. "One More River" (James Reyne) – 3:56
16. "Slave" (James Reyne, J. Vallance) – 4:14
17. "Way Out West" (John Lee, John Du Bois, Broderick Smith, Chris Stockley, Kerryn Tolhurst) – 4:01
18. "Oh No Not You Again" (live) (Guy McDonough) – 4:09
19. "Sweet Love" (James Reyne) – 4:37

Songwriting credits from Australasian Performing Right Association (APRA).
