= The Definitive Collection (Australian Crawl & James Reyne album) =

Compilation album by Australian Crawl / James Reyne
- Released: 14 October 2002
- Genre: Rock
- Label: EMI Music

Australian Crawl albums chronology
Reckless: 1979–1995 (2000)	The Definitive Collection (2002)	The Greatest Hits (2014)

James Reyne chronology
Reckless: 1979–1995 (2000)	The Definitive Collection (2002)	Speedboats for Breakfast (2004)

The Definitive Collection is a double CD compilation album of songs credited to Australian rock band Australian Crawl and the band's lead singer, James Reyne. The album was released in October 2002. The versions of "Lakeside", "Unpublished Critics" and "Things Don't Seem" are all previously unreleased versions.

The release follows the Australian Performing Right Association (APRA) naming "Reckless (Don't Be So)" at number nineteen as part of its 75th Anniversary celebrations, where they compiled the top 30 Australian songs.

A 2-DVD set was released under the same title in May 2004. The first disc featured 15 video clips of Australian Crawl songs, two live appearances, two television appearances and a number of extras including a rare recorded performance by Spiff Rouch (the earliest incarnation of Australian Crawl). The second disc features videos and live recordings of James Reyne, as a solo artist.

== Track listing ==
CD 1: Australian Crawl

1. "Downhearted"
2. "Beautiful People"
3. "Indisposed"
4. "The Boys Light Up"
5. "Hoochie Gucci Fiorucci Mama"
6. "Love Beats Me Up"
7. "Oh No Not You Again"
8. "Errol"
9. "Daughters of the Northern Coast"
10. "Shut Down"
11. "King Sap (And the Princess Sag)"
12. "Reckless (Don't Be So)"
13. "White Limbo"
14. "Lakeside"
15. "Unpublished Critics"
16. "Things Don't Seem"
17. "Louie Louie" (live)
18. "Two Can Play"
19. "My Day at the Beach"

CD 2: James Reyne

1. "Fall of Rome"
2. "Hammerhead"
3. "Always the Way"
4. "Motor's Too Fast"
5. "Heaven on a Stick"
6. "Rip It Up"
7. "House of Cards"
8. "One More River"
9. "Harvest Moon"
10. "Some People"
11. "Slave"
12. "Any Day Above Ground"
13. "Water, Water"
14. "Way Out West" (with James Blundell)
15. "Motor City (I Get Lost)" (credited as Company of Strangers)
16. "Bug"
17. "Rainbows Dead End"
