= The Final Wave =

Live album by Australian Crawl
- Released: September 1986
- Recorded: 27 January 1986
- Genre: Rock
- Label: Freestyle Records / EMI
- Producer: John French

Australian Crawl chronology
Between A Rock and a Hard Place (1985)	The Final Wave (1986)	Lost & Found (1996)

Professional ratings
Review scores
Source	Rating
Allmusic	2.5/5 stars

The Final Wave is the second live album released by Australian rock band Australian Crawl. It is a recording of the band's final Melbourne concert on 27 January 1986. The album reached #16 on the Australian album charts upon its release.

The album cover features a copy of Japanese artist Katsushika Hokusai's best known woodblock print, The Great Wave off Kanagawa. It was first published in 1832 (Edo period) and is Hokusai's most famous work. It depicts an enormous wave threatening boats near the Japanese prefecture of Kanagawa; Mount Fuji can be seen in the background. The wave is probably not intended to be a tsunami, but a normal ocean wave created by the wind.

== Track listing ==
1. "Beautiful People" (James Reyne, Mark Hudson) – 3:37
2. "Unpublished Critics" (Reyne, Paul Williams) – 5:46
3. "Lakeside" (Reyne) – 4:25
4. "Love (Beats Me Up)" (Reyne) – 4:39
5. "White Limbo" (Simon Binks) – 3:27
6. "Two Can Play" (Simon Hussey, Reyne) – 2:35
7. "Errol" (Guy McDonough, Reyne) – 3:18
8. "Downhearted" (Sean Higgins, G McDonough, William 'Bill' McDonough) – 4:44
9. "Daughters of the Northern Coast" (G McDonough, Reyne) – 3:31
10. "The Boys Light Up" (Reyne) – 4:13
11. "Indisposed" (Brad Robinson, James Robinson, James Reyne, W McDonough) – 3:04
12. "Things Don't Seem" (G McDonough, Higgins) – 3:01
13. "Reckless (Don't Be So)" (Reyne) – 5:14
14. "(The Last) Louie Louie" (Richard Berry) – 5:17

Songwriting credits from Australasian Performing Right Association (APRA).

== Personnel ==
Credits:

- Mark Greig – guitar, vocals
- John Watson – drums
- Simon Binks – guitar, vocals
- Harry Brus – bass, vocals
- Brad Robinson – guitars, keyboards
- James Reyne – vocals

== Charts ==
Chart (1986)	Peak position
Australian (Kent Music Report)	16
