= I Remember When I Was Young =

I Remember When I Was Young: Songs from The Great Australian Songbook

Studio album by John Farnham
- Released: 6 November 2005 (Australia)
- Recorded: April–August 2005
- Genres: Pop; rock
- Length: 53:08
- Labels: Sony BMG, RCA, Gotham
- Producers: Ross Fraser, John Farnham

John Farnham chronology
John Farnham & Tom Jones - Together In Concert (2005)	I Remember When I Was Young: Songs from The Great Australian Songbook (2005)	The Essential (2009)

I Remember When I Was Young (subtitled Songs from The Great Australian Songbook) is an album by Australian vocalist John Farnham, released on 6 November 2005. It consists of cover versions of songs written or recorded by prominent Australian artists and bands from the 1970s through to the 1990s, including Daddy Cool, Mondo Rock, Cold Chisel, Men At Work, Renee Geyer, Australian Crawl, Richard Clapton, The Badloves, Leonardo's Bride and The Whitlams. The album's title track was written and performed by blues musician Matt Taylor of the band Chain.

== Chart ==
The album debuted on the ARIA charts at #2 and soon after its release it peaked at #1. To promote the album, Farnham appeared on the Australian version of Dancing with the Starsto perform "Downhearted" and "Come Said The Boy", and the morning television show Sunrise to perform "Downhearted" and "I Remember When I Was Young". Farnham also performed the title track during his 4-song set at the conclusion of the 2026 Commonwealth Games closing ceremony.

== Track listing ==
Title	Writer/s	Running Time	Original Artist
"Come Back Again"	(Ross Wilson)	3:40	Daddy Cool
"Heading in the Right Direction"	(M. Punch, G. Paige) –	3:48	Renee Geyer
"One Perfect Day"	. (R. Wells)	3:42	Little Heroes
I Remember When I Was Young	(M. Taylor)	4:31	Chain
"Downhearted"	(B. McDonough, G. McDonough, S. Higgins)	3:30	Australian Crawl
"Even When I'm Sleeping"	(D. Manning)	4:35	Leonardo's Bride
"Green Limousine"	(M. Spiby)	3:43	The Badloves
"Girls on the Avenue"	(R. Clapton)	4:14	Richard Clapton
"Forever Now"	(S. Prestwich)	4:06	Cold Chisel
"Reckless"	(J. Reyne)	3:56	Australian Crawl
"Come Said the Boy"	(E. McCusker)	4:31	Mondo Rock
"No Aphrodisiac"	(T. Freedman, G. Dormand, M. Ford)	5:12	The Whitlams
"Overkill"	(C. Hay)	3:42	Men at Work

== Personnel ==
- John Farnham - vocals
- Chong Lim - keyboards, arrangements
- Lindsay Field - vocals
- Lisa Edwards - vocals
- Dannielle Gaha - vocals
- Joe Creighton - double bass
- Brett Garsed - guitars
- Stuart Fraser - guitars
- Angus Burchall - drums
- Ian Cooper - violin

== Charts ==
=== Weekly charts ===
Chart (2005/06)	Peak position
Australian Albums (ARIA)	2

=== Year-end charts ===
Chart (2005)	Position
Australian Albums (ARIA)	45

== Certifications ==
Region	Certification	Certified units/sales
Australia (ARIA)	Platinum	70,000^{^}
^{^} Shipments figures based on certification alone.
