= Phalanx (album) =

Live album by Australian Crawl
- Released: December 1983
- Genre: Rock
- Length: 45:27
- Label: EMI Music Australia; Geffen Records
- Producer: Simon Binks, Ross Cockle

Australian Crawl chronology
Semantics (1983)	Phalanx (1983)	Crawl File (1984)

Singles from Phalanx
- 1. "Louie Louie" Released: December 1983

European release (1983)
- Australian Crawl: Live 1983 European cover

Professional ratings
Review scores
Source	Rating
Allmusic	3/5 stars

Phalanx is the first live album released by Australian surf rock band Australian Crawl. It was recorded live at concerts at Bombay Rock Gold Coast, Queensland and at the Sydney Entertainment Centre in October, 1983, during the 'Semantics' tour. The album was initially released on vinyl in December 1983 and was re-released on CD in May 1995. The album reached #4 on the National Album Charts being released by EMI.

The title of the album is derived from the name for the ancient Greek battle formation where long spears were presented from behind a wall of overlapping shields. The title can also refer more generally to a close-knit group of people, in this case the audience.

The cover features distinctive cartoon images by Michael Leunig with the front depicting five sharks swimming towards a lone wader – they are revealed to be five other swimmers with shark fin hair (see infobox). The back cover cartoon depicts a stage manager warning "Five Minutes Mr. Reyne" at the dressing room door. Meanwhile, Reyne is combing his hair backwards with Brylcream liberally applied, a guitar and a half-full bottle are nearby.

Phalanx was also released by Geffen Records in Europe but under a different title, Australian Crawl: Live, and with a different cover.

"Phalanx was the Crawl's fourth album... It yielded a rollicking single, in the form of the band's raucous cover of The Kingsmen's "Louie Louie"... As this album lodged itself at the top of the charts, the Crawl were off to England for some pre-Christmas shows with Duran Duran." – Glen A. Baker, 1983.

== Track listing ==
1. "Unpublished Critics" (James Reyne, Paul Williams) – 5:51
2. "The Night" (Brad Robinson) – 3:50
3. "La Califusa (Reyne) – 3:01
4. "Love Beats Me Up" (Reyne) – 4:33
5. "Things Don't Seem" (Sean Higgins, Guy McDonough) – 3:58
6. "White Limbo" (Simon Binks) – 3:43
7. "Louie Louie" (Richard Berry) – 5:48
8. "Errol" (McDonough, Reyne) – 3:32
9. "Reckless (Don't Be So)" (Reyne) – 5:41
10. "The Boys Light Up" (Reyne) – 5:30

Songwriting credits from Australasian Performing Right Association (APRA).

== Personnel ==
Credits:

- James Reyne — lead vocals, keyboards, guitar
- Simon Binks — lead guitar
- Guy McDonough — co-lead vocals, rhythm guitar
- Brad Robinson — rhythm guitar
- Paul Williams — bass guitar
- John Watson — drums
- Engineer — John Sayers

== Charts ==
Chart (1983/84)	Peak position
Australian (Kent Music Report)	4
