= Semantics (album) =

- 1983 Australian EP release by EMI

EP by Australian Crawl
- Released: 19 September 1983
- Studios: Rhinoceros Studios (Sydney); AAV studios (Melbourne)
- Genre: Surf rock
- Length: 17:53 (EP); 44:09 (LP)
- Labels: EMI Australia (Australia); Geffen (US)
- Producer: Mark Opitz

Australian Crawl chronology
Sons of Beaches (1982)	Semantics (1983)	Phalanx (1983)

Singles from Semantics
- 1. "Reckless (Don't Be So)" Released: 1983

Semantics
- 1984 UK release (Geffen Records)

Professional ratings
Review scores
Source	Rating
Allmusic	4.5/5 stars

Semantics was a 1983 EP by Australian surf rock band Australian Crawl. The album marked a change in the line-up of the band as Bill McDonough (drums) was replaced first by Graham Bidstrup (ex-The Angels, The Party Boys with Crawl member James Reyne) to record the EP. The more permanent replacement, after the EP, was John Watson (Kevin Borich Express).

The EP contains their best known song and only number 1 single, "Reckless (Don't Be So)" (aka "She Don't Like That") which was written by lead singer Reyne. Listeners of Triple M voted "Reckless" the 39th best song of all time in 2007, it was the highest placed Australian Crawl song.

In North America, Europe, Japan and South Africa Semantics was released in 1984 by Geffen Records as an expanded version LP featuring the EP's four original tracks plus re-recorded versions of six earlier Australian Crawl songs. The original EP was also re-released as a CD-EP in 1996.

Australian Crawl performed "Reckless" as one of their three songs for the Oz for Africa concert (1985). This was the Australian leg of the global Live Aid show organised by Midge Ure and Bob Geldof. The "Oz for Africa" concert was broadcast on MTV, but only performances by Australian band INXS were placed on the 20th Anniversary DVD collection.

== Background ==
Australian Crawl was founded in Melbourne, Australia by James Reyne (lead vocals/piano), his younger brother David Reyne (drums), Brad Robinson (rhythm guitar), Paul Williams (bass guitar) and Simon Binks (lead guitar) in 1978. David Reyne soon left and was replaced by Bill McDonough (drums, percussion), and the band was later joined by his younger brother Guy McDonough (vocals, rhythm guitar).

Their third studio album, Sons of Beaches was released in 1982 and reached number 1 on the albums chart. Bill McDonough left before they recorded their extended play, Semantics in 1983, which achieved number 1 on the Kent Music Report singles chart. Bill McDonough was replaced on drums, temporarily by Graham Bidstrup for the EP recording, and more permanently by John Watson. Semantics contained the track "Reckless (Don't Be So)", which some sources list as a number 1 single. A live album Phalanx was released in December 1983, and the band signed with Geffen Records for international release of their material.

In 1984, the band released the best of their early material as a compilation titled Crawl File, which peaked at number 2. Geffen released Semantics, internationally, as a long play album with six newly re-recorded tracks compiled from their first two studio albums. Promotion of the album and the subsequent tour was stalled when Guy McDonough died in June of viral pneumonia. Meanwhile, remaining Australian Crawl members had recorded their fourth studio album, Between a Rock and a Hard Place which was released in 1985 and achieved number 11. This was followed by the announcement that they would disband after another tour, the live album, The Final Wave recorded their last performance on 27 January 1986, which was released in October and peaked at number 16.

During his solo career, James Reyne recorded a different version of "Reckless" for Electric Digger Dandy (aka Any Day Above Ground) in 1991. He performs the song during live concerts.

== Track listing ==
=== Semantics EP ===
1. "Reckless (Don't Be So)" (James Reyne) – 5:20 ^
2. "The Night" (Brad Robinson) – 4:11 ^
3. "White Limbo" (Simon Binks) – 4:03 ^
4. "Looking for Cool" (Reyne) – 4:15 ^

=== Semantics LP ===
The international LP included the four tracks from the EP, as well as six newly recorded versions of the songs from the band's earlier albums. "The Boys Light Up" and "Indisposed" are re-recorded versions of tracks from their debut album The Boys Light Up (1980), while "Errol", "Lakeside", "Things Don't Seem" and "Unpublished Critics" are re-recorded versions of tracks from their second album Sirocco (1981).

1. "The Boys Light Up" (Reyne) – 4:41
2. "Errol" (Reyne, Guy McDonough) – 3:30
3. "Indisposed" (B Robinson, James Robinson, Reyne, William 'Bill' McDonough) – 4:05
4. "Looking for Cool" (Reyne) – 4:13 ^
5. "Reckless (Don't Be So)" (Reyne) – 5:23 ^
6. "Lakeside" (Reyne) – 4:49
7. "White Limbo" (Binks) – 4:04 ^
8. "Things Don't Seem" (G McDonough, Sean Higgins) – 3:57
9. "The Night" (B Robinson) – 4:13 ^
10. "Unpublished Critics" (Reyne, Paul Williams) – 5:14

=== Semantics Cassette ===
The cassette includes an additional song, "Love (Beats Me Up)", which was not included on the original release or the US release. It is a re-recording of a song from the band's 1981 album, Sirocco.

== Personnel ==
Australian Crawl

- James Reyne – lead vocals, keyboards, guitar
- Simon Binks – lead guitar
- Paul "Tubbs" Williams – bass guitar
- Guy McDonough – co-lead vocals, rhythm guitar
- Brad Robinson – rhythm guitar
- Graham "Buzz" Bidstrup – drums, keyboards (on original EP tracks, marked with ^)
- John Watson – drums (on re-recorded LP tracks, unmarked)

Additional musicians

- Andrew Thompson – saxophone
- Rosemary Westbrook – double bass on "Reckless"

Production

- David Nicholas – engineer
- Mark Opitz – producer
- Don Bartley – remastering (1996)

== Charts ==
Chart (1983)	Peak position
Australian (Kent Music Report)	1

== Certifications ==
Region	Certification	Certified units/sales
Australia (ARIA)	Gold	35,000^{^}
^{^} Shipments figures based on certification alone.

== Release history ==
Country	Date	Label
Australia	10 October 1983	EMI Australia
United States and Europe	1984	Geffen
Australia	22 October 1996	EMI Australia
