= Little Heroes =

(The) Little Heroes may refer to:

== Music ==
- Little Heroes (band), an Australian band
  - Little Heroes (album), a 1981 album by Australian band The Little Heroes
- The Little Heroes, an American rock band

== Other uses ==
- Little Heroes (film), a 1999 American TV film
- Little Heroes (novel), a 1987 science fiction novel
- Little Heroes Foundation, an Australian charity
