= Watch the World (disambiguation) =

Watch the World is an album by Little Heroes, or the title song.

Watch the World may also refer to:

- "Watch the World", a song from the 2002 album Box Car Racer
- Watch the World, a 2016 album by Markus Schulz
- Watch the World, a 1950-1951 magazine-style television documentary show on American network NBC hosted by Don Goddard
