= One Perfect Day (Little Heroes song) =

1982 song performed by Little Heroes

Single by Little Heroes

from the album Play by Numbers
- Released: March 1982
- Studio: Studios 301, Sydney, New South Wales
- Genre: New wave, pop rock
- Length: 3:30
- Label: EMI
- Songwriter: Roger Hart-Wells
- Producer: Dave Marett

Little Heroes singles chronology
"India Was Calling Me" (1981)	"One Perfect Day" (1982)	"Young Hearts" (1982)

"One Perfect Day" is a song written and sung by Roger Hart-Wells and performed by the Australian band Little Heroes. It was released in March 1982 as the lead single from their second studio album, Play by Numbers (1982). The single entered the Australian Kent Music Report Singles Chart in April 1982 and peaked at No. 12.

In June 1982, Hart-Wells said, "If this single had not succeeded, we probably would have gone off the road and had a long look at ourselves."

== Background ==
In August 2012, Roger Hart-Wells said "One Perfect Day" came to him one night as he was watching coverage of the 1979 United Kingdom general election, thinking about a beloved girlfriend who had died several months earlier, and had just finished reading a science-fiction novel This Perfect Day by Ira Levin. Hart-Wells said the song came together "very quickly".

In February 2017 Roger Hart-Wells explained how "One Perfect Day" was written about Byron Shire comedian, Sandy Gandhi (1959–2017), and a friend, Carrie Hall. He told Javier Encalada of The Northern Star, that he was watching the election of Margaret Thatcher in 1979 and thought of how Gandhi and Hall were in the United Kingdom.

== Track listings ==
7" single (EMI-679)

- Side A "One Perfect Day" - 3:30
- Side B "Just Can't Wait" - 3:20

== Charts ==
Chart (1982)	Peak position
Australian Kent Music Report	12

== Cover versions ==
- A version by Weddings Parties Anything appears as the fourth track on their Monday's Experts EP released in 1993.
- Australian country music star Sara Storer recorded a version of in 2004. The song appeared on the compilation album Crossing the tracks released on the ABC Country label, and also appears on Sara's 2010 'best of' album. Roger Hart-Wells said "Sara’s strong Aussie accent took the song into her world and she made it her own. I loved it".
- John Farnham recorded a version which appeared on his 2005 album of cover songs I Remember When I Was Young
- Shaylee Wilde recorded a version which appears on her 2021 album One Perfect Day - Live songs by request.
