= Bon Voyage (The Little Heroes song) =

Single by Little Heroes

from the album Watch the World
- Released: November 1983
- Studio: Farmyard Studios, England
- Genre: Pop rock, rock music
- Length: 3:37
- Label: EMI
- Songwriter(s): Roger Hart-Wells
- Producer(s): Rupert Hine

Little Heroes singles chronology
"Watch the World" (1983)	"Bon Voyage" (1983)	"Modern Times" (1984)

"Bon Voyage" is a song written by Roger Hart-Wells and recorded by Australian band Little Heroes. The song was released in November 1983 as the second single from the band's third studio album, Watch the World (1983). The single peaked on the Australian Kent Music Report at #51.

== Track listings ==
7" Single (EMI-1135)

- Side A "Bon Voyage" - 3:37
- Side B "Let It Go" - 4:12

== Charts ==
Chart (1983/84)	Peak position
Australian Kent Music Report	51
