= Play by Numbers =

Studio album by Little Heroes
- Released: August 1982
- Recorded: February & June–July 1982
- Studio: Studios 301, Sydney
- Genre: Rock, pop, new wave
- Label: EMI Music
- Producer: David Marett

Little Heroes chronology
Little Heroes (1981)	Play by Numbers (1982)	Watch the World (1983)

Singles from Play by Numbers
- 1. "One Perfect Day" Released: March 1982; 2. "Young Hearts" Released: July 1982; 3. "Saturday (Afternoon Inside)" Released: September 1982

Play by Numbers is the second studio album by Australian rock and pop band Little Heroes. The album was released in August 1982 and peaked at number 37.

== Reception ==
The T.V Scene Mag said "The Little Heroes are capable of provoking a blitting party mood at the twirl of a synthesiser knob" and said "the strategy is straight beat, bent words and slurred vocals" A Newspaper reviewer said "...all [the songs] seem to suffer from a deep loneliness, an alienation where all their actions are meaningless in the face of this isolation." adding "The elegane simplicity of the songs and their similarity tends to make the album pale after a while. Basically none of the songs are spectacular, but given the craftsmanship of Dave Marett's production and Hart's voice, they are certainly appealing enough."

== Track listing ==
Vinyl/cassette (EMX-114) Side one
No.	Title	Writer(s)	Length
1.	"Melbourne's Just Not New York"	Roger Hart-Wells	4:08
2.	"Saturday Afternoon Inside"	Hart-Wells	3:30
3.	"Something's Got to Happen"	Hart-Wells	4:24
4.	"Running Round in Circles"	Hart-Wells	3:41
5.	"Ophelia"	Hart-Wells	3:55
6.	"One Perfect Day"	Hart-Wells	3:30

Side two
No.	Title	Writer(s)	Length
1.	"Sound and Vision"	Hart-Wells	3:25
2.	"Pretty Shadow"	Hart-Wells	3:48
3.	"Young Hearts"	Hart-Wells, David Crosbie	3:38
4.	"To Be Her Cat"	Hart-Wells	3:42
5.	"Stay Away from Sarah"	Hart-Wells	4:26
6.	"Dusseldorf"	Hart-Wells	4:10

== Charts ==
Chart (1982)	Peak position
Australian Kent Music Report	37
