= Oliver Hayes-Brown =

Australian basketball and football player

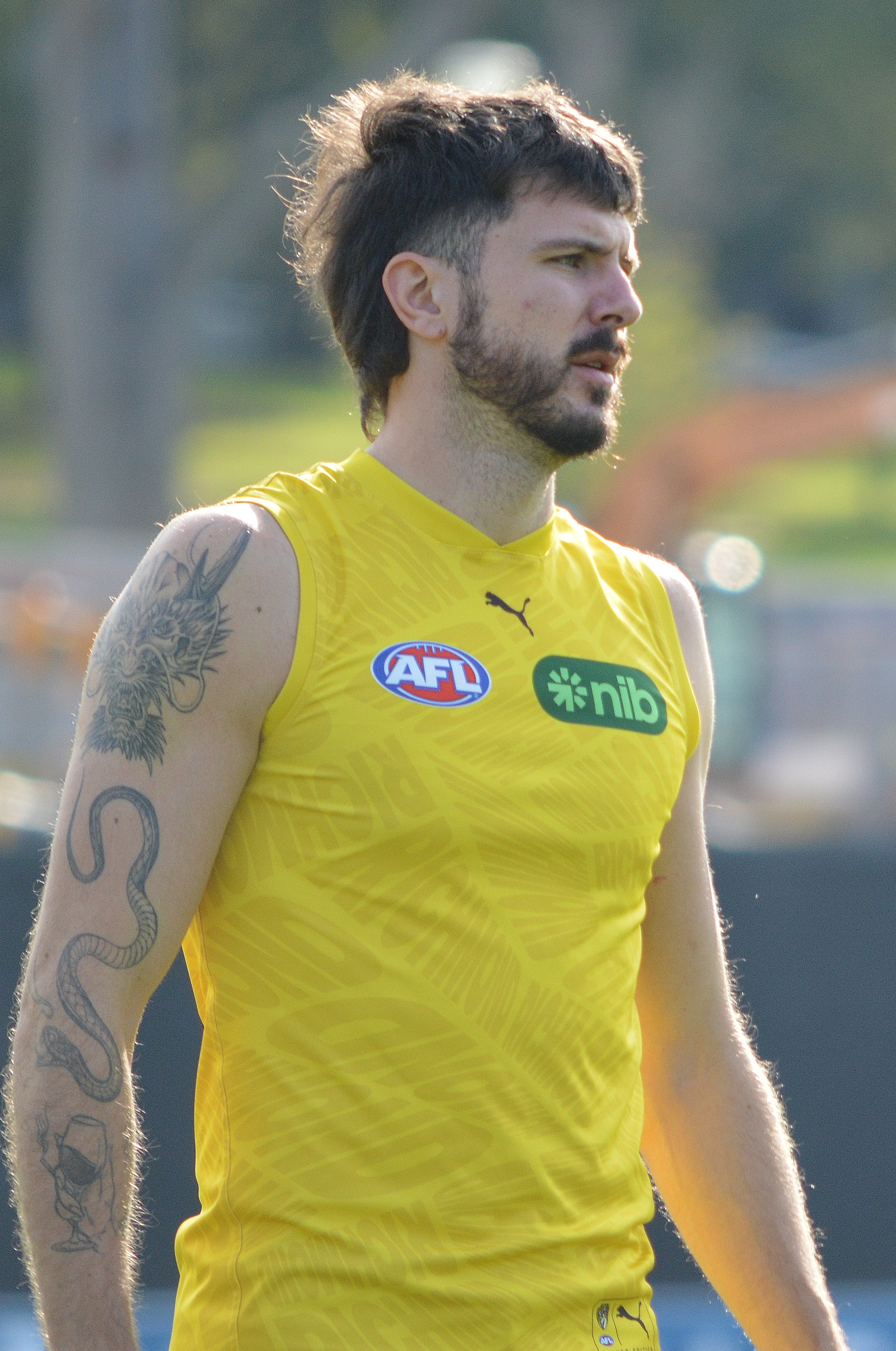
- Hayes-Brown in May 2026

Personal information
- Full name: Oliver Harry Hayes-Brown
- Nickname: Ollie
- Born: 28 April 2000 (age 26); London, England, United Kingdom
- Draft: 2024 Category B rookie
- Debut: Round 5, 2026, Richmond vs. Greater Western Sydney, at Barossa Park
- Height: 208 cm (6 ft 10 in)
- Weight: 114 kg (251 lb)
- Position: Ruck

Club information
- Current club: Richmond
- Number: 47

Playing career^{1}
Years	Club	Games (Goals)
2024–2026	Richmond	7 (1)
- ^{1} Playing statistics correct to the end of 2026.

Oliver Harry Hayes-Brown (born 28 April 2000) is an Australian sportsman who last played Australian rules football for the Richmond Football Club. He previously played basketball, playing one season of college basketball for the UC Riverside Highlanders before spending two seasons as a development player with the Perth Wildcats of the National Basketball League (NBL). In 2023, he changed codes and joined the Richmond Football Club of the Australian Football League (AFL) as a category B rookie.

== Early life ==
Hayes-Brown was born in London while his parents were both working there. One year later, the family moved to Hong Kong, where he lived for roughly five years. After moving to Melbourne, Victoria, he played under-12s football for the Mount Eliza Redlegs for a year, and then eventually had to stop because of his basketball commitments. He played basketball for the Dandenong Rangers as a junior and was a member of an Australian U19 national team. He attended Peninsula Grammar.

== Basketball career ==
Oliver Hayes-Brown
Career information
- High school: Peninsula Grammar (Melbourne, Victoria)
- College: UC Riverside (2020–2021)
- NBA draft: 2022: undrafted
- Playing career: 2017–2023
- Position: Center

Career history
- 2017: Frankston Blues
- 2018–2019; 2021: Dandenong Rangers
- 2021–2023: Perth Wildcats
- 2022: Willetton Tigers
- 2023: Keilor Thunder

=== Early years ===
Hayes-Brown played in the South East Australian Basketball League (SEABL) in 2017 with the Frankston Blues and in 2018 with the Dandenong Rangers. In 2019, he played for the Rangers in the NBL1 during the league's inaugural season.

=== College ===
After redshirting the 2019–20 season, Hayes-Brown made his college basketball debut for the UC Riverside Highlanders in the 2020–21 season. In 20 games, he averaged 3.2 points and 3.6 rebounds per game.

=== NBL1 and Perth Wildcats ===
After returning to Australia, Hayes-Brown played for the Dandenong Rangers in the NBL1 South during the 2021 NBL1 season, where he averaged 19.6 points and 13.3 rebounds in 12 games.

In October 2021, Hayes-Brown signed with the Perth Wildcats of the National Basketball League (NBL) as a development player for two seasons. In the 2021–22 NBL season, he totalled eight points and twelve rebounds in eight games.

Hayes-Brown joined the Willetton Tigers of the NBL1 West for the 2022 season. In seven games, he averaged 23.0 points, 15.1 rebounds, 2.1 assists and 1.4 steals per game.

Hayes-Brown re-joined the Wildcats for the 2022–23 NBL season as a development player. He totalled eight points and seven rebounds in five games.

Hayes-Brown joined the Keilor Thunder for the 2023 NBL1 South season. In 22 games, he averaged 14.59 points, 8.23 rebounds and 1.09 assists per game.

== Football career ==
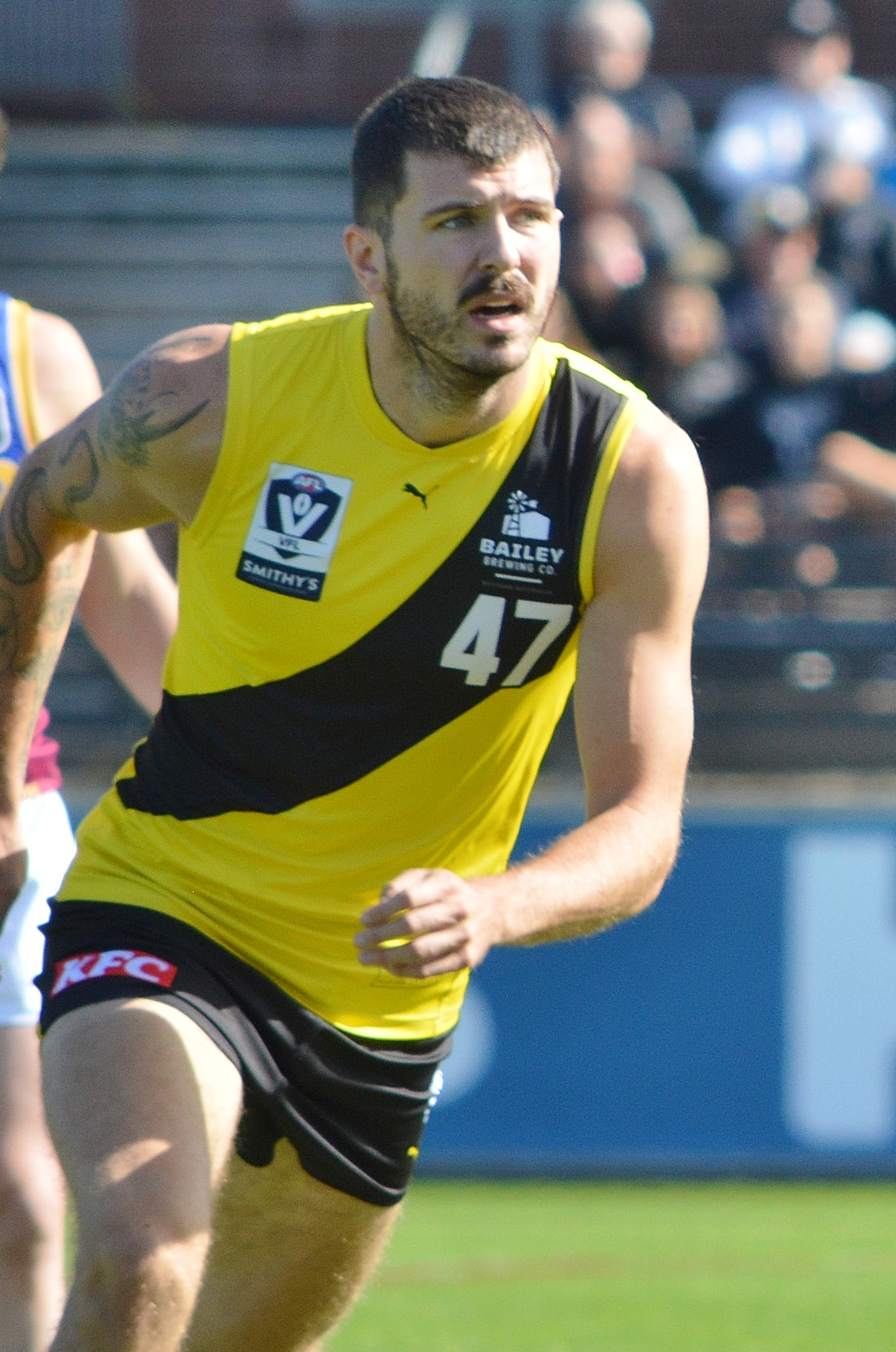
Hayes-Brown playing for Richmond VFL in 2025

On 6 September 2023, Hayes-Brown signed with the Richmond Football Club in the Australian Football League (AFL) as a category B rookie.

He made his first appearance for Richmond in a Victorian Football League (VFL) practice match against Box Hill on 9 March 2024, wearing the number 39 and kicking one goal.

Richmond allowed him to develop his ruck craft at the local level instead of the VFL, initially playing in the Victorian Amateur Football Association (VAFA) for Old Ivanhoe in the Premier B division. In June 2024, he was recalled from the VAFA and debuted for Richmond's VFL side against Port Melbourne.

In 2025, he played 16 VFL games, becoming the VFL number one ruck position while averaging 12 disposals and 21 hit-outs per game. This included a standout performance in Round 14 against the Northern Bullants where he had 26 disposals, 36 hitouts and a goal. At season's end, Hayes-Brown signed a one year contract extension.

After a strong start to the 2026 VFL season, Hayes-Brown was selected by the Tigers to make his AFL debut in round 5 against Greater Western Sydney at Barossa Park. He played seven AFL games in 2026, averaging 9.8 disposals and 11 hit-outs per game. Following the 2026 season, he was not offered a contract for the 2027 season.

== Personal life ==
Hayes-Brown knows sign language due to having a sister who is non-verbal.

== Statistics ==
Updated to the end of round 22, 2026.

Legend
G	Goals	K	Kicks	D	Disposals	T	Tackles
B	Behinds	H	Handballs	M	Marks	H/O	Hit-outs

Season	Team	No.	Games	Totals								Averages (per game)								Votes
Season	Team	No.	Games	G	B	K	H	D	M	T	H/O	G	B	K	H	D	M	T	H/O	Votes
2024	Richmond	47	0	—	—	—	—	—	—	—	—	—	—	—	—	—	—	—	—	0
2025	Richmond	47	0	—	—	—	—	—	—	—	—	—	—	—	—	—	—	—	—	0
2026	Richmond	47	7	1	0	19	50	69	6	5	83	0.1	0.0	2.7	7.1	9.9	0.9	0.7	11.9	0
Career			7	1	0	19	50	69	6	5	83	0.1	0.0	2.7	7.1	9.9	0.9	0.7	11.9	0
