= Lost & Found (Australian Crawl album) =

Compilation album by Australian Crawl
- Released: 1996
- Genre: Rock
- Label: EMI
- Producer: Peter Blyton; Bill McDonough

Australian Crawl chronology
The Final Wave (1986)	Lost & Found (1996)	More Wharf: Their Greatest Hits (1998)

Lost & Found is a compilation album of recording studio sessions credited to members of Australian Crawl and other artists; it includes tracks originally recorded with Guy McDonough and released on his 1985 posthumous solo album My Place. Guy McDonough had been Australian Crawl's guitarist, vocalist and songwriter from late 1980 until his death in 1984. Former Australian Crawl drummer Bill McDonough (Guy's older brother) and producer Peter Blyton compiled, produced and mixed the tracks for Lost & Found.

== Background ==
In mid 1996, former Australian Crawl drummer Bill McDonough and producer Peter Blyton uncovered some lost 24 track master recordings, some of which were to become Lost & Found. Copyrights that McDonough had collected and archived resulted in six reel to reel tapes containing a collection of about 17 original songs by Crawl songwriters.

The tapes had suffered slight damage due to poor storage so McDonough and Blyton traveled to Germany where the tapes were restored and transferred onto new tape stock at the EMI studios in Cologne. Next stop, Peak Studios in Düsseldorf where, for two weeks they sifted through the tapes and digitally re-mixed and re-mastered as many songs as possible, resulting in thirteen re-mastered tracks.

=== My Place sampler ===
Seven of the tracks were from Guy McDonough's album My Place, which had been produced by Bill McDonough. Musicians joining Guy McDonough included Bill McDonough (drums), Sean Higgins (keyboards) and Nigel Spencer (bass) (all former bandmates in The Flatheads), Mick Hauser (saxophone) and Michael Bright (guitar). My Place tracks include "Too Many People" a duet sung by Guy McDonough with Colin Hay of Men at Work. Some My Place tracks have Crawl's James Reyne singing backing vocals.

== Track listing ==
1. "Things Don't Seem" (Guy McDonough, Sean Higgins) – 3:48^
2. "Too Many People" (Nigel Spencer, William "Bill" McDonough) – 3:41^
3. "My Place" (G McDonough, W McDonough) – 3:13^
4. "Without You" (G McDonough, J McDonough, W McDonough) – 3:46^
5. "Oh Boy" (Higgins, Spencer, W McDonough) – 3:45
6. "Who Said" (G McDonough, W McDonough) – 2:56^
7. "Don't Go" (McDonough) – 3:32
8. "Yesterday" (W McDonough) – 3:28
9. "What's in It for Me" (G McDonough, Michael Bright, W McDonough) – 3:55^
10. "Never Said" (Higgins, W McDonough) – 3:52
11. "Lies & Kisses" (Higgins, W McDonough) – 3:51
12. "Footsteps" (Higgins, Spencer, McDonough) – 3:28
13. "Memory" (Higgins, W McDonough) – 4:11^

Songwriting credits are from Australasian Performing Right Association (APRA) except tracks 7 and 12 from album insert.

^ Indicates track also on Guy McDonough's album My Place.

"Things Don't Seem" was also a 1981 Australian Crawl single from Sirocco.
