= Young Hearts (song) =

Single by Little Heroes

from the album Play by Numbers
- Released: July 1982
- Studio: Studios 301, Sydney
- Genre: Pop rock, rock music
- Length: 3:20
- Label: EMI
- Songwriter(s): Roger Hart-Wells, David Crosbie
- Producer(s): Dave Marett

Little Heroes singles chronology
"One Perfect Day" (1982)	"Young Hearts" (1982)	"Saturday (Afternoon Inside)" (1982)

"Young Hearts" is a song written by Roger Hart-Wells and David Crosbie and recorded by Australian band Little Heroes. The song was released in July 1982 as the second single from the band's second studio album, Play by Numbers (1982). The single peaked on the Australian Kent Music Report at #42.

== Track listings ==
7" Single (EMI-765)

- Side A "Young Hearts" - 3:20
- Side B "Please Don't Wear That Hat" - 3:15

== Charts ==
Chart (1982)	Peak position
Australian Kent Music Report	42
