= John C. J. Taylor =

Australian musician and film producer

- Born: John Charles James Taylor; 1951 (age 74–75); Sydney, New South Wales, Australia
- Genres: Rock
- Occupations: Musician, graphics designer, animator, filmmaker
- Instruments: Bass guitar, vocals; acoustic rhythm
- Years active: 1968–present
- Website: John Taylor website

John Charles James Taylor (born 1951) is a musician, illustrator, animator and filmmaker from Australia. He was a founding member of Melbourne band Little Heroes in the early 1980s who achieved success in Australia with their single "One Perfect Day".

== Biography ==
John Charles James Taylor was born in 1951 and began performing in Sydney bands including Soap (1968–1969), Llama (1970–1971), Hot Rocket (1972–1973) and Uncle Bob's Band (1973–1976).

As a member of Uncle Bob's Band he produced the original artwork for many of the band's promotional posters, that placed him among street artists of the day including Chips MacInolty from the Sydney University who gave technical assistance in the Tin Sheds (Sydney University). Uncle Bob's Band moved to Melbourne and Taylor established himself as a musician and artist when the band broke up in 1976. He produced art for the Tiger Room which later transformed into the Tiger Lounge and a comic strip Gigs of our Lives for the TAGG Gig Guide in Melbourne and Sydney. He also produced art for many Melbourne venues, radio stations, bands, record covers and concerts including Bananas, Hearts, 3RRR Radio Station, Phil Manning, Suicide Records, RMIT Storey Hall, the Astor Theatre, and others.

Other Melbourne bands include "Phones" (1977–1978), "Secret Police" (1978–1979), "Little Heroes" (1979–1982) and "Routinos" (1982) before concentrating on his illustration work. Whilst with Little Heroes he produced most of the art including their debut self-titled album.

Taylor completed a Post Graduate Diploma (Animation) Course at the Swinburne Film & Television School in 1985, his student film The Huge Adventures of Trevor, a Cat, won a number of awards including an AFI Award for 'Best Animated Film' in 1986. He went on to produce many documentary films and videos including You're Fired (fire safety) and Here's Your Bike, Ed (bike education) both of which won Australian Teachers of Media (ATOM) awards and an Australian Writers' Guild (AWGIE) scriptwriting award in 1992.

Taylor now writes and records his original songs, as well as prose, screenplays and for the stage.
