= Watch the World =

Studio album by Little Heroes
- Released: September 1983
- Recorded: June 1983
- Studios: Farmyard Studios, English
- Genres: Rock, pop, new wave
- Label: EMI Music
- Producer: Rupert Hine

Little Heroes chronology
Play by Numbers (1982)	Watch the World (1983)	Live Bootleg 1980 (2015)

Singles from Watch the World
- 1. "Watch the World" Released: August 1983; 2. "Bon Voyage" Released: November 1983; 3. "Modern Times" Released: April 1984

Watch the World is the third and final studio album by Australian rock and pop band Little Heroes. The album was released in September 1983 and peaked at number 50.

== Reception ==
A Perth newspaper in 1984 said "Watch the World set the standards for Australian albums last year through its fine production and engineering. The band suddenly found itself being watched by the world as the heroes became more than your average Oz pub band."

Robert Vella said "Watch the World is an album of greater substance and less obvious commercial intent. It's not that the accessibility is missing, it's just that it is more strategically placed."

== Track listing ==
Vinyl/cassette (EMX-114) Side one
No.	Title	Writer(s)	Length
1.	"Watch the World"	Roger Hart-Wells	5:01
2.	"Bon Voyage"	Hart-Wells	3:37
3.	"Modern Times"	Hart-Wells, Paul Bell	3:53
4.	"Memories"	Hart-Wells	3:40
5.	"Seventh Heaven"	Hart-Wells, Paul Brickhill, Anthony Tavasz	4:08

Side two
No.	Title	Writer(s)	Length
1.	"Painting Pictures"	Hart-Wells	3:55
2.	"Beating Drums"	Hart-Wells	3:30
3.	"Waiting"	Hart-Wells,	4:14
4.	"Whose Turn To Cry"	Bell, Brickhill, Tavasz	3:41
5.	"Castles in the Air"	Hart-Wells	4:50

== Charts ==
Chart (1983)	Peak position
Australian Kent Music Report	50
