= Music Australia (online resource) =

Australian free online music service

Music Australia was a free national online service hosted by the National Library of Australia, launched on 14 March 2005, covering all types, styles, and genres of Australian music. It was integrated into Trove in 2012.

== History of development ==
Developing and delivering the systems to make the service possible posed enormous challenges to music librarians and information professionals across Australia. When the first ideas for a service were floated in 2001, Australia’s music was scattered across many different institutions, libraries, archives, museums and arts and specialists music organizations, and there was no way for users or researchers to find and access them. There were no collections of digitized printed music and although some national institutions had been digitally preserving their sound collections, none were available online.

As part of the content generation the National Library developed a cooperative plan with the state libraries to digitize Australian sheet music within their emerging digitization programs. Some state libraries, such as Queensland and Western Australia, also developed arts initiatives to perform and record hitherto unknown historic musical works pertaining to their regions, and others, such as the State Library of South Australia, commenced programs to digitally preserve and deliver sound recordings.

=== Music Australia 1.0 ===
Music Australia 1.0 was launched in March 2005 with a wide and substantial range of content from major and minor contributing institutions. Soon after release the service faced more challenges and changes, motivated by the need for sustainability amidst rapidly changing digital information business models and in response to external demands and user feedback.

Changes in the music industry related to technology and delivery models have affected the service's efforts to provide access to Australian music resources for research or recreation. The organization sought to increase access to Australian digital music, including historical and contemporary printed music and digital audio downloads.

=== Music Australia 2.0 ===
A new Business to Government (B2G) partnership with an Australian digital music supplier provided the opportunity for the service to offer to users access to a database of Australian contemporary online tracks and albums, with 30 second sound samples and pathways for legal digital downloads through e-commerce, while protecting the rights of artists and performers with digital rights management processes.

This B2G, together with identified service enhancements and bug fixes, combined with recommendations from a user and web usability survey commissioned in 2006, drove the changes to Music Australia 1.0. and resulted in the release of Music Australia 2.0 in April 2007.

=== Integration with Trove ===
In 2012, Music Australia was integrated with Trove, and ceased to exist as a separate entity.

== Content ==
The collection includes music scores, sound recordings, websites, pictures, films, multimedia, kits, objects, archival collections and other music-related material held in libraries, archives, museums, universities, and specialist music and research organisations in Australia. The service contains information about Australian music, including books and theses, information created by Australians about non-Australian music, and biographical entries for Australian musicians, performers, composers, groups and ensembles, festivals, and organizations.

Music Australia uses various permalinks to ensure permanent links and access to its resources.
