= Things Don't Seem =

Single by Australian Crawl

from the album Sirocco
- A-side: "Things Don't Seem"
- B-side: "Big Fish"
- Released: May 1981
- Genre: Pop/rock
- Length: 3:55
- Label: EMI
- Songwriters: Guy McDonough, Sean Higgins
- Producer: Peter Dawkins

Australian Crawl singles chronology
"Downhearted" (1980)	"Things Don't Seem" (1981)	"Errol" (1981)

"Things Don't Seem" is the first single by Australian surf rock band Australian Crawl from their 1981 album Sirocco. It was produced by Peter Dawkins The song features one of the band's most complex pieces of lead guitar work, thanks to the skills of guitarist Simon Binks.

"Things Don't Seem" was released in May 1981 and reached #11 on the Australian Singles Charts.

Guy McDonough re-recorded the song for his solo album, My Place, which was released posthumously in 1985, by his brother, Bill McDonough. It was also included as the 'B' side to the first single, "My Place", taken from the album. The original Australian Crawl version featured James Reyne on vocals.

In January 2018, as part of Triple M's "Ozzest 100", the 'most Australian' songs of all time, "Things Don't Seem" was ranked number 78.

== Track listing ==
1. "Things Don't Seem" (Guy McDonough, Sean Higgins) - 3:55
2. "Big Fish" (James Reyne) - 2:42

== Personnel ==
Credits:

Band members

- James Reyne — lead vocals, piano
- Simon Binks – lead guitar, slide guitar, acoustic guitar
- Guy McDonough — rhythm guitar
- Bill McDonough — drums, percussion
- Paul Williams — bass guitar
- Brad Robinson — rhythm guitar

Recording process

- Engineer – Dave Marett ("Things Don't Seem"), Ross Cockle ("Big Fish")
- Producer – Peter Dawkins ("Things Don't Seem"), David Briggs ("Big Fish")

== Charts ==
=== Weekly charts ===
Chart (1981)	Peak position
Australian (Kent Music Report)	11

=== Year-end charts ===
Year-end chart performance for "Things Don't Seem"
Chart (1981)	Position
Australia (Kent Music Report)	78
