= Little Heroes (album) =

Studio album by Little Heroes
- Released: August 1981
- Recorded: January 1981
- Studio: Studios 301, Paradise Studios - Sydney
- Genre: Rock, pop
- Label: Giant Recording Company
- Producer: Peter Dawkins

Little Heroes chronology
Little Heroes (1981)	Play by Numbers (1982)

Singles from Little Heroes
- 1. "For a Bleeding Heart" Released: March 1981; 2. "Last Number One" Released: June 1981; 3. "India Was Calling Me" Released: November 1981

Little Heroes is the debut studio album by Australian rock and pop band Little Heroes. The album was released in August 1981 and peaked at number 81.

== Background and release ==
Little Heroes were formed with the remnants of a band called The Secret Police, following some personnel changes in 1979. In 1980, Little Heroes competed in the Victorian State heat of the 1980 Battle of the Sounds, finishing second, progressing to the national final which they ultimately won, winning $5000 in prize money. This led to the recording of the band's debut self-titled debut album.

== Track listing ==
Vinyl/cassette (GIANT 02) Side one
No.	Title	Writer(s)	Length
1.	"For a Bleeding Heart"	Roger Hart-Wells
2.	"India Was Calling Me"	Hart-Wells
3.	"The Last Number One"	Hart-Wells
4.	"Catch Me"	Hart-Wells
5.	"At Zorba's"	Hart-Wells

Side two
No.	Title	Writer(s)	Length
1.	"That Girl"	Hart-Wells
2.	"Pretty Shadow"	Hart-Wells
3.	"She Says"	Hart-Wells
4.	"That’s Me"	Hart-Wells
5.	"Coming Home"	Hart-Wells

== Charts ==
Chart (1981)	Peak position
Australian Kent Music Report	81
