= Peninsula Grammar =

Location
- 20 Wooralla Drive; Mount Eliza, Victoria 3930; Australia; 38°11′55″S 145°5′27″E

Information
- Type: Private school, co-educational, Anglican, day and boarding school
- Motto: Latin: Quod Bonum Tenete (Hold fast that which is good)
- Denomination: Anglican
- Established: 1961
- Principal: Leandra Turner
- Chaplain: Malcolm Woolrich
- Years offered: K–12
- Gender: Co-educational
- Enrolment: 1,400 (K–12) (approximately) (2026)
- Colours: Blue, red and gold
- Slogan: Learn. Grow. Flourish!
- Affiliation: Associated Grammar Schools of Victoria
- Alumni: Old Peninsula Grammarians
- Website: http://peninsulagrammar.vic.edu.au

Peninsula Grammar, formerly The Peninsula School, is an Australian private, co-educational, Anglican, day and boarding school located in Mount Eliza, Victoria.

== History ==
Founded in 1961, originally as a boys-only school, Peninsula Grammar began enrolling girls from 1994. It is a member of the Associated Grammar Schools of Victoria. The school has a non-selective enrolment policy and caters for approximately 1,190 students from Kindergarten to Year 12. Co-educational from 1994 and an Anglican school, Peninsula's chaplain for twenty-four years (1974–1998) – the Rev. John Leaver – initiated the founding of several other similar Anglican or Ecumenical co-educational schools in Victoria.

== International program ==
In addition to catering for the boarding of international students (notably from China, South Korea and Vietnam), Peninsula Grammar operates multiple overseas campuses, largely in South East Asia.

== Houses ==
- Ansett, royal purple
- Carr, navy blue
- Clarke, red
- Country, gold
- Newton, green
- Town, sky blue

== Sport ==
Peninsula Grammar is a member of the Associated Grammar Schools of Victoria (AGSV).

=== AGSV and AGSV/APS premierships ===
Peninsula Grammar has won the following AGSV and AGSV/APS premierships.

Boys:

- Athletics (4) – 2004, 2005, 2006, 2007
- Badminton (2) – 1994, 1995
- Basketball – 2007
- Cricket (5) – 1976, 1989, 1990, 1992, 2016
- Cross Country – 1990
- Golf (2) – 1994, 1995
- Hockey – 1991
- Squash – 1994
- Tennis (13) – 1977, 1980, 1985, 1987, 1992, 1993, 1996, 1998, 2004, 2008, 2009, 2010, 2020
- Volleyball (3) – 1999, 2004, 2011

Girls:

- Athletics (12) – 2002, 2003, 2004, 2005, 2006, 2007, 2008, 2010, 2011, 2012, 2013, 2015
- Basketball – 2013
- Cross Country (12) – 2004, 2005, 2006, 2007, 2008, 2010, 2011, 2012, 2013, 2014, 2015, 2016
- Netball – 2007
- Swimming (3) – 2006, 2007, 2008
- Tennis (2) – 2003, 2004

== Notable alumni ==
- Simon Binks – musician
- Belle Brockhoff – Olympic Athlete
- Ryan Broekhoff – basketball player
- Andrew Daddo – actor
- Cameron Daddo – actor
- Lochie Daddo – actor
- Jarrad Grant – Western Bulldogs AFL footballer
- Billy Hartung – Hawthorn AFL footballer (Number 23 AFL Draft Pick for the 2014 season)
- Oliver Hayes-Brown – basketball player
- David Hille – Essendon AFL footballer
- Rob Hulls – Victorian Attorney General
- Greg Hunt – Liberal member for Flinders from 2001 until his retirement in May 2022
- Simon Hussey – ARIA award composer/recording producer for James Reyne and Daryl Braithwaite
- Sammy J (Samuel J. McMillan) – comedian
- Nathan Jones – Melbourne AFL footballer
- Matson Lawson – Australian representative to the 2012 Olympics in swimming
- Stewart Loewe – former St Kilda AFL footballer
- John McCarthy – Port Adelaide AFL footballer
- Bryce McGain – Australian cricketer
- Peter Mitchell – Channel 7 News presenter
- Mick Molloy – comedian
- Grace O'Sullivan – actress, known for her role as Olivia Lane on Neighbours
- James Rees – entertainer and host of Giggle and Hoot
- David Reyne – musician and actor
- James Reyne – musician
- Brad Robinson – musician
- Tim Ross – comedian/radio presenter for Nova 100.3fm
- Jackie Sannia – musician and producer (finalist on The Voice Australia 2013 season)
- James Sorensen – actor
- Dale Stevenson – Australian representative to the 2012 Olympics in athletics
- Matt Tilley – radio presenter
- Jacob Weitering – Carlton AFL footballer (number 1 draft pick for the 2015 season)
- Eliza West - Hawthorn AFLW player
- Lachie Whitfield – Greater Western Sydney AFL footballer (Number 1 AFL Draft Pick for the 2013 season)
- Claudia Whitfort – St Kilda AFLW footballer
- Tim Wilson – MP for Goldstein for the Liberal Party and former Australian Human Rights Commissioner
- Sam Sturt – Fremantle Dockers AFL footballer

== See also ==
- List of schools in Victoria
- List of high schools in Victoria
