= Little Heroes (band) =

Australian band (1980–1984)

The Little Heroes
- Origin: Melbourne, Victoria, Australia
- Genres: New wave, pop rock, soft rock
- Years active: 1980–1984
- Labels: Giant/CBS, EMI, Capitol
- Past members: see Members list

Little Heroes were an Australian band formed in 1980, by founding mainstay Roger Hart (aka Roger Wells or Roger Hart-Wells, ex-Secret Police) on lead vocals and guitar. They released three studio albums, Little Heroes (August 1981), Play by Numbers (August 1982) and Watch the World (September 1983). Their highest charting hit, "One Perfect Day", which was released in 1982, reached No. 12 on the Kent Music Report Singles Chart. Their other charting singles are "Young Hearts" (1982), "Watch the World" and "Bon Voyage" (both 1983). They disbanded in June 1984.

== History ==
In 1980, Little Heroes were formed in Melbourne from the remnants of pub rockers Secret Police. Secret Police had formed in 1978, with Roger Hart (aka Roger Wells or Roger Hart-Wells, ex-The Cruisers) as singer-songwriter and guitarist, Bruce Pumpa on drums, and Neil Walker on bass guitar. Walker died in 1979 from leukaemia and was replaced by John Taylor (ex-Soap, Llama, Hot Rocket and Uncle Bob's Band). They were soon joined by Andrew Callender on guitar and backing vocals, and Peter Linley on saxophone. The Secret Police did not issue any records, although they posthumously contributed "Emotion" and "Everybody Looks Lonely at Night" to Missing Link Records' various artists compilation album The Melbourne Club (1981). In 1980 Hart, Pumpa and Taylor joined with David Crosbie on keyboards to start an indie pop band, The Little Heroes.

The Little Heroes competed in the Victorian state heat of the 1980 Battle of the Sounds, finishing second; however upon progressing they won the national final in Sydney, earning $5000. In November that year they released their debut single, "She Says". Huk Treloar (ex-Bleeding Hearts, High Rise Bombers, Living Legends, Sneakers) replaced Pumpa on drums. The group signed with Giant Records/CBS to record their debut self-titled album, with production by Peter Dawkins (Matt Finish), which was released in August 1981. It reached No. 81 on the Australian Kent Music Report albums Chart and provided three singles, "For a Bleeding Heart" (March 1981), "Last Number One" (June), and "India Was Calling Me" (September). Later that year Alan 'Clutch' Robertson replaced Treloar on drums.

By early 1982, the group had signed to EMI Records and started recording their second album, Play by Numbers, with Dave Marrett producing. The first single from these sessions, "One Perfect Day", was released in March, which reached No. 12. Their second single, "Young Hearts" (July), which reached No. 42. By mid-82, Martin Fisher (ex-Breakers) had replaced Crosbie on keyboards, and Peter Leslie replaced Taylor on bass guitar. The new line up completed Play by Numbers at 301 Studios in Sydney in July with Marrett. The album was released in August and peaked at No. 37. In October it yielded a third single, "Saturday (Afternoon) Inside", which failed to chart.

At the end of 1982, Fisher and Leslie left to join fellow indie pop band, Dear Enemy, and were replaced by Paul Brickhill (ex-MEO-245) on keyboards and bass guitarist, Rick Loriot (ex-Inserts). Loriot left after four weeks and was replaced on bass guitar by Anthony Tavasz (ex-Modesty). The group added Paul Bell on guitar which allowed Hart more freedom as lead vocalist.

In June 1983, The group travelled to the United Kingdom to record their third album, Watch the World, with UK producer, Rupert Hine (The Fixx, Howard Jones). The album was issued in Australia in September and reached No. 50.

The lead single, "Watch the World", was released in August and reached No. 73, while the second single "Bon Voyage" (November) peaked at No. 51. Both are written by Hart (as Roger Galtier Wells). A third single "Modern Times", co-written by Hart and Bell, appeared in March the following year but it failed to chart. Also that month Hart announced he was leaving the group and by June The Little Heroes had disbanded.

== Post Heroes ==
After The Little Heroes had broken up, Roger Hart (as Roger Wells) became a writer and meditation trainer. His books on meditation include: Happy to Burn: Meditation to Energise Your Spirit (Lothian 1997) and Love & Imagination. His first novel, Levin's God (2004), was published by Fremantle Arts Centre Press. The Sydney Morning Herald's reviewer, Juliette Hughes, felt the book was "like the reminiscences of an old rock-dog" and his writing was "prolific and specific and sometimes tells more than some of us want to know, but keeps us turning those hundreds of pages just to find out what happens to everyone". John Taylor became a film maker and graphics designer. He won an AFI award for The Huge Adventures of Trevor, a Cat in the category of Best Short Animation in 1986.

As of September 2013 Paul Brickhill was the Head of Music/Audio Visual Coordinator at the Australian Ballet School. As of December 2000 David Crosbie was the Chief Executive of Melbourne's Odyssey House, a drug and alcohol treatment centre, and was on the National Expert Advisory Committee on Drugs. By 2007 he was the Chief Executive of the Mental Health Council of Australia and a member of Australian National Council on Drugs.

Alan 'Clutch' Robertson worked for Warner Music for sixteen years in Australia, Malaysia and Singapore. He then established Alan Robertson Management, representing various bands: Magic Dirt, Taxiride and Juke Kartel. Robertson later worked in the mobile advertising and publishing industry.

Martin Fisher became a Crown Prosecutor in the Northern Territory and by October 2010 was Acting Director, Legal Policy for the Department of Justice. He played keyboards in popular Darwin band The Fabulous Baker Brothers. Peter McCaughley (ex-Ready Rubbed) was a drummer for The Secret Police from 1979 to 1980. After leaving The Secret Police he joined Danger Dancer and died in 1986 of a brain haemorrhage at the age of 32.

In December 2015 a previously unreleased live album, recorded at RMIT Storey Hall and broadcast live on Melbourne radio station 3RRR, was released digitally. The album was called 'Live Bootleg 1980'.

== Members ==
- David Crosbie – keyboards (1980–1982)
- Roger Hart (aka Roger Wells or Roger Hart-Wells) – lead vocals, guitar (1980–1984)
- Bruce Pumpa – drums (1980)
- John C. J. Taylor – bass guitar, backing vocals (1980–1982)
- Huk Treloar – drums (1980–1981)
- Alan 'Clutch' Robertson – drums, percussion (1981–1984)
- Martin Fisher – keyboards (1982)
- Peter Leslie – bass guitar (1982)
- Paul Bell – lead guitar, vocals (1983–1984)
- Paul Brickhill - keyboards, vocals (1983–1984)
- Ric Loriot - bass (1983)
- Anthony Tavasz - bass, synthesiser (1983–1984)

== Discography ==
=== Studio albums ===
List of studio albums, with selected chart positions.
Title	Album details	Peak chart positions
Title	Album details	AUS KMR
Little Heroes	Released: August 1981; Label: Giant Recording Company(GIANT 02); Formats: LP	81
Play by Numbers	Released: August 1982; Label: EMI Records (EMX-114); Formats: LP	37
Watch the World	Released: September 1983; Label: EMI Records (EMX-126); Formats: LP	50

=== Live albums ===
List of studio albums, with selected chart positions.
Title	Album details
Live Bootleg 1980	Released: 8 December 2015; Label: Laneway Music; Format: Digital Download

=== Singles ===
List of singles, with selected chart positions, showing year released and album name.
Title	Year	Peak chart positions	Album
Title	Year	AUS KMR	Album
"She Says"	1980	—	Non-album single
"For a Bleeding Heart"	1981	—	The Little Heroes
"Last Number One"	1981	—	The Little Heroes
"India Was Calling Me"	1981	—	The Little Heroes
"One Perfect Day"	1982	12	Play by Numbers
"Young Hearts"	1982	42	Play by Numbers
"Saturday (Afternoon Inside)"	1982	-	Play by Numbers
"Watch the World"	1983	73	Watch the World
"Bon Voyage"	1983	51	Watch the World
"Modern Times"	1984	—	Watch the World
"—" denotes a recording that did not chart or was not released in that territory.
