= Australian Crawl =

Australian rock band

- Australian Crawl performing live

Background information
- Also known as: Clutch Cargo
- Origin: Mornington Peninsula, Victoria, Australia
- Genres: Pop; rock; pub rock
- Years active: 1978–1986, 2026
- Labels: EMI; Geffen; Virgin
- Members: James Reyne; David Reyne; John Watson; Brett Kingman; Josh Owen; Andrew McIvor; Sean Johnson; Melinda Jackson; Nicole Kurta
- Past members: Brad Robinson; Paul Williams; Bill McDonough; Guy McDonough; Graham "Buzz" Bidstrup; Mark Greig; Harry Brus; Simon Binks

Australian Crawl (often called Aussie Crawl or The Crawl by fans) are an Australian rock band founded by James Reyne (lead vocals/piano/harmonica), Brad Robinson (rhythm guitar), Paul Williams (bass), Simon Binks (lead guitar) and David Reyne (drums) in Melbourne in 1978. David Reyne soon left and was replaced by Bill McDonough (drums, percussion). They were later joined by his brother Guy McDonough (vocals, rhythm guitar). The band was named after the front crawl swimming style also known as the Australian crawl.

Australian Crawl was associated with surf music and sponsored a surfing competition in 1984. However, the band also handled broader social issues such as shallow materialism, alcoholism, car accidents, and cautionary tales of romance.

After its 1980 debut album, The Boys Light Up, reached No. 4, Australian Crawl had two No. 1 albums; 1981's Sirocco and 1982's Sons of Beaches. The early singles reached the top 25 but none broke into the Top Ten; the best performing single was No. 1 hit "Reckless" which came from the 1983 Semantics EP.

Upheaval within the band occurred from 1983 onwards. First, Bill McDonough left in 1983, then his brother Guy McDonough died in 1984, and finally, Paul Williams departed in 1985. The 1985 release Between a Rock and a Hard Place was produced at an exceptionally high cost of $400,000 AUD, but sales were disappointing. They disbanded in early 1986. The band's status as an icon on the Australian music scene was acknowledged by induction into the 1996 Australian Recording Industry Association (ARIA) Hall of Fame. Hospitalised with lymphoma, founding guitarist Brad Robinson was unable to attend the Hall of Fame induction in person. He died two weeks later.

== Biography ==
=== 1975–1979: formation and "Beautiful People" ===
The band Spiff Rouch formed in 1976 in the Mornington Peninsula suburb of Mount Eliza on the outskirts of Melbourne. The group lineup featured James Reyne, brothers Bill and Guy McDonough, Paul Williams, Robert Walker and Simon Binks. Reyne had previously played drums for Archie Slammit and the Doors.

By early 1978 Spiff Rouch had separated into two groups: The Flatheads (including the McDonough brothers and Walker, along with Sean Higgins and Nigel Spencer) and Australian Crawl. The original lineup for the latter was Reyne as vocalist, Binks on lead guitar, Williams on bass guitar, along with Reyne's younger brother David Reyne on drums and schoolmate Brad Robinson on rhythm guitar. Australian Crawl performed their first live gig in October 1978 and toured the pub circuit.

David Reyne left the group in 1979 to finish his acting course, later becoming an actor and TV presenter as well as drumming for Cats Under Pressure and the Chantoozies (1986–1990). He was replaced in Australian Crawl by Bill McDonough. The group's popularity in the Mornington Peninsula area increased with further pub gigs, then they gained audiences with university students and inner city residents.

Once the band's escalating popularity brought them into Melbourne they caught the attention of Little River Band's guitarist David Briggs, who helped them gain a recording contract with EMI and he produced their first single. "Beautiful People" (1979) reached No. 22 on the national charts. Reyne had co-written the song with guitarist Mark Hudson in 1975. The track included references to the shallow materialism of residents of Toorak and to the Bombay Rock night club in Brunswick.

Just days before recording "Beautiful People" Reyne had been hit by a car on Swanston Street, Melbourne, breaking bones in both wrists, an episode later chronicled in the track "Indisposed". Australian Crawl made one of the most memorable debuts on Australian Broadcasting Corporation (ABC) TV series Countdown performing "Beautiful People" as Reyne still had both arms encased in plaster. "Beautiful People" remains one of their most popular songs according to listeners of Triple M in 2007.

=== 1980 The Boys Light Up ===
Australian Crawl's debut album, The Boys Light Up (1980), also produced by Briggs for EMI, had a number of hit singles with songwriting shared around the group and beyond. Tracks from this album included the previously released single "Beautiful People", the title track (written by Reyne and Mark Hudson); "Indisposed" (Brad Robinson, James Robinson, Reyne, Bill McDonough) and "Downhearted" (Sean Higgins, Guy McDonough, Bill McDonough) (from The Flatheads).

"The Boys Light Up", their second single, was almost banned from radio play due to its explicit lyrics. Many listeners believed the chorus lyrics were about smoking marijuana but Reyne has stated that it was about smoking tobacco cigarettes at school. It also reached No. 22 on the National charts and became their signature song and their most popular track especially live. Their third single "Downhearted" charted higher at #12 and was a cautionary tale of romance gone wrong.

The Boys Light Up reached No. 4 on the Australian album charts and remained in the charts for an unbroken 101 weeks. It sold five times platinum: over 280,000 copies, and became one of the biggest Australian albums of the 1980s.

Singer/guitarist/songwriter Guy McDonough (ex-The Flatheads and Bill's younger brother) joined the group in October 1980.

Rock journalist and commentator Glenn A. Baker compared Australian Crawl with various fellow Australian bands:

Australian Crawl seemed to step out of a tourism poster... Spruce, lean, tanned and young... They swam, they surfed, they radiated a healthy, wholly Australian aura... If Skyhooks has personified the bodgie larrikin and Cold Chisel the hard drinking working class man, Australian Crawl turned the bronzed lifesaver into a pop idol... Crawl songs seemed to eulogise hedonism, adventure and the great outdoors for an audience that couldn't be bothered with Midnight Oil's politics.

— Glenn A. Baker, 1983

However, according to James Reyne some people accused them of being demonic. He said whenever you bumped into the member of Little River Band who had found God, he'd tell him "you shouldn't be playing that, it's demonic".

=== 1981–1982: Sirocco and Sons of Beaches ===
In 1981, Australian Crawl recorded their second album, Sirocco, with producer Peter Dawkins in Sydney. Named for Errol Flynn's yacht, the album peaked at No. 1 on the Australian album chart on 3 August and remained there for six weeks. At about this time Robinson was married to actress Kerry Armstrong, later an Australian Film Institute Award winner, who co-wrote a track "Easy on Your Own" for the album.

Sirocco spawned the hit singles "Things Don't Seem" (May, No. 11 National charts) and "Errol" (August, #18). It also included "Oh No Not You Again" (November). Of these, "Errol" about womanising Tasmanian-born actor Flynn is the band's third most popular song of all. Another track from the album, "Lakeside", became a popular radio inclusion. 1981 Australian End of Year Album Charts has Sirocco at No. 2 behind Double Fantasy by John Lennon and ahead of AC/DC's Back in Black making it the best charting album by an Australian act.

Another track on this album, "Unpublished Critics" has been compared several times to the later song "Sweet Child o' Mine" by US band Guns N' Roses, as acknowledged by the writer of "Unpublished Critics", James Reyne. He was responding to media comments in May 2015 about the possibility of plagiarism by the American band. Duff McKagan, who was bass player with Guns N' Roses when "Sweet Child o' Mine" was written and recorded, found the similarities between the songs "stunning," but said he had not previously heard "Unpublished Critics."

On the wave of popularity the band toured extensively playing to huge crowds at Melbourne's Myer Music Bowl (10,000), Sydney's Domain (90,000), the Narara Rock festival (70,000), smashing attendance records at indoor venues in Brisbane and Perth. They were voted Countdown 1981 Most Popular Group, and James Reyne was voted 1980 and 1981 Most Popular Male Performer.

Sons of Beaches (1982) was recorded in Hawaii with expatriate Australian Mike Chapman producing. The album had a rougher, rock 'n' roll edge than its glossy pop rock predecessors and featured the No. 17 hit "Shut Down" (June). It also included a re-recorded version of "Downhearted" and became their second album to reach No. 1 on the Australian albums chart and remained there for five weeks. EMI issued the album in the USA. Two further singles, "Daughters of the Northern Coast" (August) and "Runaway Girls" (November) failed to reach the Australian Top 40.

Over 1982 and 1983, Reyne was filmed with Australian actresses Rebecca Gilling and Wendy Hughes in the television miniseries Return to Eden, which was screened in September 1983. For Reyne's role of playboy tennis professional Greg Marsden, he was given the 1984 "Most Popular New Talent Award" at the TV Week Logie Awards. Reyne later declared he was not very good in the part, declining many acting offers since. During breaks in filming, the singer accepted an offer from Paul Christie (Mondo Rock) and Kevin Borich to join their part-time band The Party Boys with Harvey James from Sherbet and Graham Bidstrup from The Angels. The group played a short run of shows around Sydney venues and played covers exclusively. The resultant album, Live at Several 21sts, peaked at No. 9 on the national chart.

=== 1983–1984: "Reckless", Semantics and Phalanx ===
Soon after Reyne finished acting for Return to Eden, Bill McDonough left due to tensions within the band. The remaining members then recorded the EP Semantics (1983) with Bidstrup (from The Party Boys, later a founder of GANGgajang) on drums. The four track EP contained their best-known song, "Reckless" (aka "Don't Be So Reckless", "She Don't Like That") which was written by Reyne, and went to No. 1 on the Australian singles chart on 28 November. John Watson (Kevin Borich Express) then came in as a permanent replacement for McDonough. The live album Phalanx was something of a stop-gap measure between studio albums, nevertheless it reached No. 4 during December. The band's biggest overseas break came when Duran Duran took the band as support on certain legs of their "Sing Blue Silver" tour of the UK.

US label Geffen Records signed Australian Crawl and issued Semantics (1984) as an album (with the four songs from the EP and re-recordings of tracks from past Australian records) for the international market. In April 1984 Australian Crawl became the first Australian band to sponsor an ASP surfing competition. The Rip Curl/Australian Crawl Bell's Beach Surfing Festival was won by Australian surfer, Cheyne Horan.

In June 1984 the band was forced off the road when Guy McDonough was admitted to hospital in Melbourne; he died soon after of viral pneumonia. Australian Crawl regrouped with Mark Greig on guitar (ex-Runners) for a series of live performances in late 1984. Prior to Guy's death, he had recorded demos with his brother Bill McDonough (drums, percussion), Sean Higgins (synthesisers) and Nigel Spencer (bass, synthesisers), (all former The Flatheads); and Mick Hauser (saxophone) and Michael Bright (guitar). Bill McDonough assembled the tapes and produced Guy McDonough's posthumous album My Place on Wheatley Records in April 1985. Singles "My Place" / "Things Don't Seem" and "What's in it For Me" / "Hook, Line and Sinker" were also released. "Things Don't Seem" written by Guy McDonough and Sean Higgins, had been released as an Australian Crawl single in 1981 off Sirocco. Tracks from these sessions were re-mastered and released on Lost & Found in 1996.

=== 1985–1986: Between a Rock and a Hard Place, The Final Wave and split ===
By 1985 the group recorded their last studio album, Between a Rock and a Hard Place, with English producer Adam Kidron. It was released in Australia on Australian Crawl's own label Freestyle Records. The album, which allegedly cost $400,000 to record, was a mishmash of styles and -- considering the expectations placed on the LP's sales -- a commercial disaster. (It peaked at No. 11 in August 1985 but slipped out of the Top 40 two weeks later; their previous two albums had hit #1, and received multi-platinum certifications.) None of the singles had any Top 40 chart success. Harry Brus (Kevin Borich Express) replaced long-standing bass player Paul Williams in May 1985. The band performed three songs for the July 1985 Oz for Africa concert—part of the global Live Aid program—"Reckless (Don't Be So)", "Two Can Play" and "The Boys Light Up". It was broadcast in Australia (on both Seven Network and Nine Network) and on MTV in the US.

When the album virtually failed to chart, the band was ready to split but had to go out on tour to pay off its debts. On 27 January 1986, their final Melbourne concert was recorded and released as the live album The Final Wave in October. The band performed its final concert on 1 February at the Perth Entertainment Centre.

We really enjoy Perth, and have a lot of friends there, so it was a conscious decision to play our final show there. Besides, everybody expected us to play the last show back in Melbourne, so stuff 'em.

— James Reyne

In seven years, Australian Crawl had sold over one million records in Australia, with five of its albums and an EP reaching the Australian Top 5 Album Charts, two of which had been No. 1 hits. A cumulative total of eleven weeks at Number 1 on the Albums Charts places them equal fourth for Australian groups behind Skyhooks, The Seekers and Midnight Oil.

=== 1986–1995: Solo careers ===
In 1985, Lin Buckfield (Electric Pandas) and Reyne released a duet single "R.O.C.K." / "Under My Thumb". After Australian Crawl disbanded, Reyne went on to a solo career. His first few singles failed to chart but 1987's "Fall of Rome" and the self-titled album that followed were the beginning of a string of hits that lasted until the early 1990s. In 1992 he and James Blundell had a hit with a cover of The Dingoes' "Way Out West" (#2, May 1992). Reyne also formed Company of Strangers that year with former Sherbet lead singer Daryl Braithwaite, Simon Hussey and Jef Scott. Company of Strangers only released one self-titled album, Company of Strangers in 1992, which produced the hits "Motor City (I Get Lost)" (#26, September 1992), "Sweet Love" (#21, January 1993) and "Daddy's Gonna Make You a Star" (#35, March 1993).

In 1993 Reyne appeared as Tina Turner's manager Roger Davies in What's Love Got to do With It?. He featured in twelve episodes of State Coroner during 1998 and in 2003's The Postcard Bandit. Reyne lives on the Mornington Peninsula with his partner, Tina, and a daughter. He has released his eighth solo studio album, Every Man a King (2007) and still performs occasionally.

Almost immediately after the split Robinson became manager of Chantoozies (with early Crawl drummer David Reyne). Their first single, "The Witch Queen of New Orleans" (1986), a cover of Redbone's song, reached No. 4 on the National charts. Robinson then moved into a career in television (with Network Ten's Page One) and as a co-producer of documentaries. In the 1990s he became the manager for the Reyne brothers and worked as an agent for the Advantage Sports Management Group. This included managing Australian tennis player Mark Philippoussis. Three years after being diagnosed with lymphoma, Robinson died on 13 October 1996.

Paul Williams, who had left the band in 1985, played in the Broderick Smith Band in 1987 and has worked in music-related retail. Simon Binks and Mark Greig both played in the Broderick Smith Band in 1988. Simon Binks was injured in a 1995 car crash at a council roadworks that left him slightly brain-damaged. A court in 2006 awarded him $330,253 in damages, down from an estimated $750,000 because he was said to be over the legal limit. Binks later disputed the alcohol reading as belonging to another driver and stated the remuneration mostly went to his lawyers. A 2007 appeal by the council, saw amount awarded further reduced to $304,750.

=== 1996–present: ARIA Hall of Fame, compilations and reunion ===
In 1996, a compilation titled Lost & Found was released. It contained seven of the tracks from Guy McDonough's solo album My Place which were remastered. Compilers and producers of Lost & Found were Bill McDonough and Peter Blyton. Lost & Found tracks from My Place include "Too Many People" a duet sung by Guy McDonough with Colin Hay of Men at Work. Some My Place tracks used on Lost & Found have Reyne singing backing vocals. As of 2001, Bill McDonough left the music industry and began working in the construction industry and continues to own and operate his building and demolition companies in 2017.

The band was inducted into the ARIA Hall of Fame in September 1996. Three weeks later, Robinson died.

Additional compilation albums were released; More Wharf in 1998, Reckless: 1979–1995 in 2000 and The Definitive Collection in 2002. The Definitive Collection contained songs from the band and from James Reyne's solo career.

In 2001, as part of its 75th Anniversary celebrations, the Australian Performing Right Association (APRA) compiled a list of the Top 30 Australian songs, with "Reckless (Don't Be So)" coming in at number nineteen.

In October 2007, eleven Australian Crawl tracks were featured in the Triple M Essential 2007 Countdown of songs (positions are voted by listeners out of the best 2007 songs of all time). They were "Hoochie Gucci Fiorucci Mama" #1673; "Lakeside" #1354; "Indisposed" #956; "Downhearted" #728; "Oh No Not You Again" #587; "Shut Down" #415; "Things Don't Seem" #371; "Boys Light Up" #305; "Errol" #227; "Beautiful People" #153; and "Reckless" #39.

In January 2014, Universal Music Australia celebrated the 35th anniversary of the release of "Beautiful People" by releasing The Greatest Hits, which peaked at number 4 and was the 40th best selling album in Australian in 2014.

In October 2016, Australian Crawl released a seven album vinyl collection, titled The Album Collection. The collection included the band's four studio albums, two live albums and the US-expanded version of the Semantics album which had previously been unavailable to Australian audiences.

On 16 June 2026, the Reyne brothers and Simon Binks announced the band would reform to headline the Red Hot Summer Tour in October and November 2026. The touring festival also features Men At Work, Birds of Tokyo, Vika & Linda, Eskimo Joe, Boom Crash Opera, and Ella Hooper. In September 2026, however, Binks confirmed that while he had attended rehearsals he would not be participating in the tour.

== Members ==
Current members

- James Reyne – lead vocals, harmonica (1978–1986, 2026–present), keyboards (1981–1986), rhythm guitar (1985–1986)
- David Reyne – percussion (2026–present), drums (1978–1979)
- John Watson – drums (1983–1986, 2026–present)
- Brett Kingman – lead guitar, backing vocals (2026–present)
- Josh Owen – rhythm guitar, backing vocals (2026–present)
- Andrew McIvor – bass, backing vocals (2026–present)
- Sean Johnson – keyboards, backing vocals (2026–present)
- Melinda Jackson – backing vocals (2026–present)
- Nicole Kurta – backing vocals (2026–present)

Former members

- Brad Robinson – rhythm guitar, keyboards, backing vocals (1978–1986; died 1996)
- Paul Williams – bass guitar, backing vocals (1978–1985)
- Bill McDonough – drums, backing vocals (1979–1983)
- Guy McDonough – rhythm guitar, backing and occasional lead vocals (1980–1984; his death)
- Graham "Buzz" Bidstrup – drums (1983)
- Mark Greig – rhythm guitar (1984–1986)
- Harry Brus – bass guitar (1985–1986)
- Simon Binks – lead guitar, backing vocals (1978–1986, 2026)

== Discography ==
- The Boys Light Up (1980)
- Sirocco (1981)
- Sons of Beaches (1982)
- Semantics (1983 EP / 1984 LP)
- Phalanx (1983)
- Between a Rock and a Hard Place (1985)
- The Final Wave (1986)

== Awards and nominations ==
=== ARIA Music Awards ===
The ARIA Music Awards is an annual awards ceremony that recognises excellence, innovation, and achievement across all genres of Australian music. They commenced in 1987. Australian Crawl were inducted into the Hall of Fame in 1996.

Year	Nominee / work	Award	Result
1987	Art Scarff for The Final Wave by Australian Crawl	Best Cover Art	Nominated
1996	Australian Crawl	ARIA Hall of Fame	inductee

=== TV Week / Countdown Awards ===
Countdown was an Australian pop music TV series on national broadcaster ABC-TV from 1974–1987, it presented music awards from 1979–1987, initially in conjunction with magazine TV Week. The TV Week / Countdown Awards were a combination of popular-voted and peer-voted awards.

Year	Nominee / work	Award	Result
1980	"Downhearted"	Best Single Record	Nominated
1980	The Boys Light Up	Best Australian Record Cover Design	Nominated
1980	The Boys Light Up	Most Popular Record	Nominated
1980	Themselves	Most Popular Group	Nominated
1980	James Reyne (Australian Crawl)	Most Popular Male Performer	Won
1981	Sirocco	Best Australian Album	Nominated
1981	Themselves	Most Popular Group	Won
1981	James Reyne (Australian Crawl)	Most Popular Male Performer	Won
1982	Themselves	Most Popular Group	Nominated
1983	Mark Opitz for work with Australian Crawl	Best Record Producer of the Year	Nominated
1983	Themselves	Most Popular Group	Won
1983	James Reyne (Australian Crawl)	Most Popular Male Performer	Nominated
