= Simon Binks =

Australian rock musician (born 1956)

- Binks performing with Australian Crawl

Background information
- Born: Simon John Binks; 27 November 1956 (age 69); Mount Eliza, Victoria, Australia
- Genre: Rock
- Occupations: Musician, singer, songwriter, record producer
- Instrument: Guitar
- Years active: 1976–present
- Labels: EMI, Geffen, Virgin, Blue Pie
- Website: simon-binks.com

Simon John Binks (born 27 November 1956) is an Australian rock musician who was a guitarist and singer-songwriter for Australian Crawl from its founding in 1978 to the groups disbanding in 1986.

== Biography ==
=== Early career ===
Binks was raised in the Mornington Peninsula suburb of Mount Eliza on the outskirts of Melbourne and educated at The Peninsula School.

Spiff Rouch was a band formed in 1976, it included Binks and fellow locals James Reyne, Bill McDonough, Guy McDonough, Paul Williams, and Robert Walker. By early 1978, Spiff Rouch had separated and Australian Crawl was formed with Binks (lead guitar), Reyne (lead vocals, piano, harmonica), and Williams (bass guitar), they were joined by James Reyne's younger brother David Reyne (drums) and schoolmate Brad Robinson (rhythm guitar, backing vocals).

=== Australian Crawl ===
Australian Crawl performed their first live gig in October 1978. Bill McDonough (drums) replaced David Reyne within the first year.

Binks wrote or co-wrote four tracks for Australian Crawl's 1980 debut album The Boys Light Up as well as guitars (lead, slide, acoustic) and vocals. Bill's brother, Guy McDonough (guitars, singer-songwriting) joined Australian Crawl later that year. For their second album Sirocco in 1981, Binks supplied two tracks, and guitar work; the third album, Sons of Beaches in 1982, had Binks providing guitars but no songwriting credits.

Drummer Bill McDonough left early in 1983, the Crawl recorded an EP Semantics with Graham Bidstrup on drums. Of the four tracks, Binks wrote "White Limbo" which was also the B-side of the European single release "Reckless". Mountain climber, Lincoln Hall, quotes lyrics from Binks' song in his book, White Limbo: The first Australian climb of Mt Everest (1985). The EP Semantics charted on the Australian Singles Charts to reach No. 1 and consequently some sources list "Reckless" as a No. 1 single. After the EP, John Watson replaced Bidstrup as drummer.

Phalanx released late in 1983 was a live album which saw Binks and sound engineer Ross Cockle as producers. Australian Crawl toured England supporting Duran Duran in late 1983 but they returned to Australia with Guy McDonough seriously ill and subsequently dying in June 1984. During recording sessions for Between a Rock and a Hard Place, Mark Greig (ex-Runners), shared guitar duties with Binks. Between a Rock and a Hard Place was expensive and had less chart success than previous albums. A final national tour resulted in the live album, The Final Wave, which was released in 1986.

=== Later career ===
Binks played guitar in the Broderick Smith Band in 1988. He signed with Blue Pie Productions, in July 2004 but didn't produce any recorded materials and subsequently left.

An injury in a 1995 car crash at a North Sydney Council roadworks left Binks slightly brain-damaged with some sensory loss and restriction of finer movements of his right hand, which had prevented him from regaining the high level of skill he had previously shown. A court in 2006 awarded him $330,253 in damages, down from an estimated $750,000 because lawyers for North Sydney Council provided evidence that Binks was speeding and over the legal alcohol limit. Binks later disputed the alcohol reading as belonging to another driver and stated the remuneration mostly went to his lawyers. During the court case media also reported that he fell out with Crawl co-founder James Reyne after claiming to have written "The Boys Light Up", one of Australian Crawl's early hits. Binks denied this also, claiming that although he wrote the introductory musical theme from "The Boys Light Up" such work was not usually credited, and that the basic chords and lyrics were written by Reyne. After an appeal by the Council, in September 2007, the amount Binks was awarded was reduced to $304,750.

=== Personal life ===
By November 1993 Binks was married and they had a child. During his court case v North Sydney Council, evidence was presented that he suffered from migraines most of his life and had been prescribed injections of pethidine by his doctor to combat the pain. Evidence from the court cases reported that Binks was due to separate from his wife Sharon in 2006. He lives with his daughter, Elizabeth, and continues to perform and write music.

== Discography ==
- Spiff Rouch (1976–1978)
  - "Wangaratta Bay" on The Definitive Collection (13 May 2004, 2×DVD) (by Australian Crawl and James Reyne) EMI (724359 9292 9 3)
- Australian Crawl (1978–1986)
- The Boys Light Up (1980)
- Sirocco (1981)
- Sons of Beaches (1982)
- Semantics (1983 EP, 1984 LP)
- Phalanx (1983)
- Between a Rock and a Hard Place (1985)
- The Final Wave (1986)
- Broderick Smith Band (1988)
  - No known recorded output
