= Sons of Beaches =

Studio album by Australian Crawl
- Released: July 1982
- Recorded: March–May 1982
- Studio: Sea West, Hawaii and United Western, Hollywood; Music Farm Studio, near Byron Bay, Australia
- Genre: Rock
- Length: 47:44
- Label: EMI
- Producer: Mike Chapman

Australian Crawl chronology
Sirocco (1981)	Sons of Beaches (1982)	Semantics (1983)

Singles from Sons of Beaches
- 1. "Shut Down" Released: June 1982; 2. "Daughters of the Northern Coast" Released: August 1982; 3. "Runaway Girls" / "Santa Claus is Back in Town" Released: December 1982

Professional ratings
Review scores
Source	Rating
Allmusic	2/5 stars

Sons of Beaches is the third studio album from Australian rock band Australian Crawl, released in July 1982. It became the band's second #1 in the Australian albums charts (for 5 weeks). The album was recorded in Hawaii with ex-pat Mike Chapman, who had also produced Blondie and The Knack.

== Reception ==
Cash Box magazine said "Recorded in Hawaii with studio mastermind Mike Chapman, the Aussie sextet can boomerang from brooding songs about 'Daughters of the Northern Coast' to a silly bop tune like 'King Sap (and Princess Sag)' with ease."

== Track listing ==
1. "Runaway Girls" (Guy McDonough)
2. "Daughters of the Northern Coast" (James Reyne, G McDonough)
3. "Mid-Life Crisis" (Reyne)
4. "Shut Down" (William "Bill" McDonough)
5. "King Sap (and Princess Sag)" (Reyne)
6. "Letter from Zimbabwe" (Reyne)
7. "Downhearted" (Sean Higgins, G McDonough, W McDonough)
8. "Live Now, Pay Later" (Reyne)
9. "Dianne" (G McDonough)
10. "Grinning Bellhops" (Reyne)
11. "Waiting" (Brad Robinson, G McDonough)
12. "(Not So) Happy Song for Problem Children" (Reyne)

Songwriting credits from Australasian Performing Right Association (APRA).

== Charts ==
=== Weekly charts ===
Chart (1982)	Peak Position
Australia (Kent Music Report)	1

=== Year-end charts ===
Chart (1982)	Peak position
Australia (Kent Music Report)	11

== Certifications and sales ==
Region	Certification	Certified units/sales
Australia (ARIA)	Platinum	50,000^{^}
^{^} Shipments figures based on certification alone.

== Personnel ==
Credited to:

- James Reyne – lead vocals
- Simon Binks – lead guitar, slide guitar
- Guy McDonough – rhythm guitar, backing vocals; lead vocals on "Runaway Girls", "Dianne" and "Waiting"
- Brad Robinson – rhythm guitar
- Paul Williams – bass
- Bill McDonough – drums, backing vocals, percussion
- Producer — Mike Chapman
