= The Boys Light Up =

Studio album by Australian Crawl
- Released: April 1980
- Recorded: August 1979 – February 1980
- Studio: AAV Studios (Melbourne, Victoria)
- Genres: Pop, rock
- Length: 38:25
- Label: EMI
- Producer: David Briggs

Australian Crawl chronology
The Boys Light Up (1980)	Sirocco (1981)

Singles from The Boys Light Up
- 1. "Beautiful People" Released: August 1979; 2. "The Boys Light Up" Released: March 1980; 3. "Downhearted" Released: May 1980

The Boys Light Up 1992 Re-release
- The Boys Light Up 1992 CD cover

Professional ratings
Review scores
Source	Rating
Allmusic	4/5 stars

The Boys Light Up is the debut album from Australian pub rock band Australian Crawl, which was released in 1980 and contains the title track, "The Boys Light Up", "Indisposed", "Downhearted" and their previously released debut single "Beautiful People". The album reached #4 on the Australian album charts and remained in the charts for an unbroken 101 weeks, eventually selling over 280 000 copies (five times platinum).

Various band members were involved in songwriting, often with relatives or former bandmates. Rhythm guitarist Brad Robinson's father James Robinson was a Federal Arbitration Court Justice and co-wrote two songs for this album. Reyne's bandmate from Spiff Rouch, Mark Hudson co-wrote their first single, "Beautiful People" (1979). "Downhearted" was written by Bill McDonough and his bandmates from The Flatheads, Guy McDonough (his brother, who later joined the Crawl) and Sean Higgins. Producer, David Briggs (Little River Band guitarist), co-wrote "Hoochie Gucci Fiorucci Mama" with Reyne.

The album was re-released in 1992 in CD format (see cover right below), and as a 2-CD set with follow-up album Sirocco in 1996. In October 2010, Boys Light Up was listed in the top 50 in the book, 100 Best Australian Albums.

== Track listing ==
1. "My Coffee's Gone Cold" (Simon Binks) – 3:29
2. "Man Crazy" (James Reyne) – 3:39
3. "Way I've Been" (Brad Robinson, James Robinson) – 2:17
4. "Chinese Eyes" (James Reyne, Simon Binks) – 3:01
5. "Downhearted" (Sean Higgins, Guy McDonough, William 'Bill' McDonough) – 3:09
6. "Beautiful People" (James Reyne, Mark Hudson) – 2:56
7. "Indisposed" (Brad Robinson, James Robinson, James Reyne, William 'Bill' McDonough) – 4:04
8. "Walk My Way" (James Reyne, Brad Robinson) – 2:44
9. "The Boys Light Up" (James Reyne) – 4:41
10. "Boot Hill" (James Reyne, Simon Binks) – 2:36
11. "Red Guitar" (Simon Binks) – 3:19
12. "Hoochie Gucci Fiorucci Mama" (James Reyne, David Briggs) – 2:30

Songwriting credits from Australasian Performing Right Association (APRA).

== Personnel ==
Credited to:

=== Australian Crawl ===
- James Reyne – lead vocals, harmonica
- Simon Binks – lead and slide guitar, vocals
- Bill McDonough – drums, percussion, vocals
- Brad Robinson – rhythm guitar, vocals
- Paul Williams – bass, vocals

=== Additional musicians ===
- Mal Logan, Eddie Rayner, Peter Jones, Keith McKay – keyboards
- Bill Harrower – saxophone
- Derek Pellicci – percussion
- Mal Stainton – backing vocals

=== Additional credits ===
- Ross Cockle — engineer
- David Briggs — producer

== Charts ==
=== Weekly charts ===
Chart (1980)	Peak position
Australia (Kent Music Report)	4

=== Year-end charts ===
Chart (1980)	Peak position
Australia (Kent Music Report)	8

== Certifications ==
Region	Certification	Certified units/sales
Australia (ARIA)	Platinum	50,000^{^}
^{^} Shipments figures based on certification alone.
