= Sirocco (album) =

Studio album by Australian Crawl
- Released: July 1981
- Recorded: March–April 1981
- Studio: EMI Studios 301
- Genre: Pop rock
- Length: 46:07
- Label: EMI Australia
- Producer: Peter Dawkins

Australian Crawl chronology
The Boys Light Up (1980)	Sirocco (1981)	Sons of Beaches (1982)

Singles from Sirocco
- 1. "Things Don't Seem" Released: May 1981; 2. "Errol" Released: September 1981; 3. "Oh No Not You Again" Released: November 1981

Professional ratings
Review scores
Source	Rating
Allmusic	4.5/5 stars

Sirocco is the second album from Australian rock band Australian Crawl. It was released in July 1981 and on 3 August, it topped the Australian charts where it remained for six weeks, the band's first of two albums to hit #1. It was released a year after their successful debut The Boys Light Up which had reached No. 4.

The album was recorded in March–April 1981 in Sydney and produced by Peter Dawkins (Air Supply, Billy Thorpe, Dragon, John Farnham).

"I was approached by Australian Crawl, who were about to do their second album, Sirocco. They’d been tortured to death by David Briggs, or at least by his studio style, and needed a change. We got along incredibly well, it was all so comfortable. They played me twenty new songs, I gave them a list of the eleven I liked and we just said let’s go."

Sirocco spent eight months in the Top 20 and was their most successful album. 1981 Australian End of Year Album Charts has Sirocco at No. 2 behind Double Fantasy by John Lennon and Yoko Ono, and ahead of AC/DC's Back in Black making it the best charting album by an Australian act.

The album was named after Australian born actor Errol Flynn's yacht and included the second single from the album, a lyrical biography, called "Errol". Sirocco was the Crawl's first US and European release.

Drummer Bill McDonough's younger brother Guy McDonough (co-lead vocals, rhythm guitar) had joined as their sixth member. Guy had already co-written tracks for their first album and now wrote or co-wrote five of Sirocco's eleven tracks, including all three singles, also providing lead vocals on "Errol", "Oh No Not You Again", and "Resort Girls". "Errol" was voted their third most popular song by listeners of Triple M in 2007. The other single from the album was "Things Don't Seem" which reached No. 11 and was their fifth most popular song in the 2007 poll.

Sean Higgins was a bandmate with the McDonough brothers in an earlier band, The Flatheads, and had co-written "Downhearted" for Boys Light Up; Higgins co-wrote "Things Don't Seem" for Sirocco. At about this time guitarist Brad Robinson was married to actress Kerry Armstrong, later an Australian Film Institute Award winner, and they co-wrote "Easy on Your Own", which was also the B-side to "Errol".

At the 1981 Countdown Music Awards, the album was nominated for Best Australian Album.

== Track listing ==
1. "Things Don't Seem" (Guy McDonough, Sean Higgins) – 3:57
2. "Unpublished Critics" (James Reyne, Paul Williams) – 5:14
3. "Love (Beats Me Up)" (Reyne) – 4:35
4. "Oh No Not You Again" (G McDonough) – 5:08
5. "Lakeside" (Reyne) – 4:49
6. "Trusting You" (William "Bill" McDonough, G McDonough) – 3:09
7. "Errol" (Reyne, G McDonough) – 3:30
8. "Can I Be Sure" (Simon Binks) – 3:37
9. "Easy on Your Own" (Binks, Brad Robinson, Kerry Armstrong) – 3:48
10. "Love Boys" (W McDonough) – 3:41
11. "Resort Girls" (G McDonough) – 4:36

Songwriting credits from Australasian Performing Right Association (APRA).

== Personnel ==
Adapted from AllMusic.

- James Reyne – lead vocals, piano
- Simon Binks – lead guitar, slide guitar, acoustic guitar
- Guy McDonough – co-lead vocals, rhythm guitar
- Bill McDonough – drums, percussion
- Paul Williams – bass guitar
- Brad Robinson – rhythm guitar
- Engineer – Dave Marett
- Photography – Jamie Morgan
- Producer – Peter Dawkins

== Charts ==
=== Weekly charts ===
Chart (1981)	Peak position
Australian (Kent Music Report)	1

=== Year-end charts ===
Chart (1981)	Peak position
Australia (Kent Music Report)	2
