= Brad Robinson =

Australian rock musician (1958–1996)

- Born: Bradford Leigh Robinson; 28 January 1958; Adelaide, South Australia, Australia
- Died: 13 October 1996 (aged 38) Melbourne, Victoria, Australia
- Genre: Rock
- Occupations: Singer; songwriter; guitarist
- Years active: 1976–1996
- Labels: EMI; Geffen; Virgin

Bradford Leigh Robinson (28 January 1958 – 13 October 1996) was an Australian rock musician best known as lead and rhythm guitarist with the 1980s band Australian Crawl. He had a later career as a manager for musicians and sports personalities.

In 1993 Robinson was diagnosed with lymphoma and, in October 1996 when Australian Crawl were inducted into the Australian Record Industry Association (ARIA) Hall of Fame, he was hospitalised with the disease and unable to attend. He died two weeks later, aged 38.

== Early life ==
Born in Adelaide, South Australia, Robinson was a son of Federal Arbitration Court Justice James Robinson. He was raised in Frankston South on the outskirts of Melbourne and educated at The Peninsula School.

== Career ==
Spiff Rouch formed in 1976 in the Mornington Peninsula suburb of Mount Eliza. The line-up featured James Reyne, brothers Bill and Guy McDonough, Paul Williams, Robert Walker and Simon Binks. By early 1978, Spiff Rouch had separated and a new band was formed with Robinson, Reyne, Binks and Williams. They were joined by James Reyne's younger brother, David Reyne on drums.

=== Australian Crawl ===
The band members went through various band names, including Clutch Cargo, before they settled on Australian Crawl. They performed their first live gig in October 1978. Bill McDonough replaced David Reyne within the first year. Besides guitars, Robinson also supplied keyboards, backing vocals and song writing for the group. Robinson co-wrote Australian Crawl's early song "Indisposed" with his father, and bandmates James Reyne and Bill McDonough. It appeared on the band's debut 1980 album, The Boys Light Up. The song describes the car accident which resulted in Reyne breaking both wrists immediately before they recorded their first single "Beautiful People" (1979). His father also helped Robinson write "Way I've Been" for the album, which was the B-side of their fourth single, "Downhearted". Crawl's second album was 1981's Sirocco, which reached #1 on the Australian Albums Chart and became the best selling Australian album for the year.

The Crawl's 1982 release Sons of Beaches also reached #1 on the albums charts. This was followed by 1983's Semantics EP which topped the Australian Singles Charts, containing the song "Reckless". Upheaval occurred within the band, with Bill McDonough leaving in 1983 and his brother Guy McDonough dying of viral pneumonia. Other members left subsequently with the only mainstays, Robinson, Binks and James Reyne, remaining until Binks' resignation forced Crawl to disband in early 1986.

=== Later career ===
After Australian Crawl disbanded, Robinson moved into a career in television (with Network Ten's Page One) and as a co-producer of documentaries. Robinson was an award presenter on Countdown Music & Video Awards broadcast on 20 April 1986. He was the manager for Chantoozies (which included David Reyne) in the late 1980s. In the 1990s he managed both Reyne brothers and worked as an agent for the Advantage Sports Management Group, including managing tennis player Mark Philippoussis.

Robinson was a member of the Challenge Board of Management, which assists children with cancer. Australian Crawl had been inducted into the Australian Record Industry Association (ARIA) Hall of Fame two weeks before Robinson died.

== Personal life and death ==
During 1981, Robinson was briefly married to actress, Kerry Armstrong, later an Australian Film Institute Award winner, and they co-wrote "Easy on Your Own", which was also B-side of the single, "Errol". In 2003, Armstrong reflected, "I met Braddy at that time and he was the first person who absolutely, implicitly understood me and who loved me for every aspect of what I did and who I loved. I had a complete... a resting place finally."

Armstrong received a scholarship to study at the Herbert Berghof acting school in New York City and wanted to emigrate to the US. In order to work and obtain residency, Armstrong and Robinson agreed she should marry a US citizen, so the couple divorced and she married Alexander Bernstein, a friend and fellow actor. Armstrong only had a professional arrangement with Bernstein, but her long-distance from Robinson dissolved their relationship. In early 2018, she described the relationship with Robinson, "I think everyone should hold on to their first great love and be grateful... [but] I know there are no accidents because I have come out of it with these three absolutely gorgeous young men as sons."

Robinson died in Melbourne on 13 October 1996, three years after being diagnosed with lymphoma. His memorial service was held in Melbourne's Botanical Gardens.

== Discography ==
Australian Crawl studio albums with Robinson:

- The Boys Light Up (1980)
- Sirocco (1981)
- Sons of Beaches (1982)
- Semantics (1983 EP, 1984 LP)
- Between a Rock and a Hard Place (1985)
