= Guy McDonough =

Australian rock musician (1955–1984)

- Born: Guy Gillis McDonough; 17 October 1955; Mount Eliza, Victoria, Australia
- Died: 26 June 1984 (aged 28) Melbourne, Victoria, Australia
- Genres: Rock
- Occupations: Singer; songwriter; guitarist
- Instrument: Guitar
- Years active: 1976–1984
- Labels: EMI; Geffen; Virgin

Guy Gillis McDonough (17 October 1955 – 26 June 1984) was an Australian rock musician best known for rhythm guitar and singer-songwriter with the iconic band Australian Crawl. He provided rhythm guitar and lead vocals on two of their well-known songs, "Oh No Not You Again" and "Errol". McDonough's solo 1985 release, My Place, was produced by his brother, Bill McDonough.

== Biography ==
=== Early years ===
Guy McDonough's parents were William Morris (1929–1966) and June-Eva (née Sturzaker) McDonough (c. 1931–2013). Together with his elder brother Bill McDonough, he grew up in Mount Eliza on Mornington Peninsula south east of central Melbourne. McDonough attended The Peninsula School and formed Spiff Rouch in 1976 with Bill McDonough (drums) and other locals James Reyne (vocals, guitars, keyboards), Brad Robinson (guitars, keyboards), Paul Williams (bass guitar), Robert Walker, Mark Hudson (guitars) and Simon Binks.

By early 1978 Spiff Rouch had separated into two groups: The Flatheads and Clutch Cargo. The Flatheads had Guy and Bill McDonough, and Walker, who were joined by Sean Higgins (synthesisers) and Nigel Spencer (bass guitars, synthesisers). Clutch Cargo was renamed Australian Crawl and David Reyne (drums) soon left to be replaced by Bill McDonough. Guy McDonough had co-written "Downhearted", with Higgins and Bill McDonough, for the Crawl's third single from debut 1980 album The Boys Light Up.

=== Australian Crawl ===
Guy McDonough joined Australian Crawl in October 1980, supplying rhythm guitar, vocals, and songwriting. The Crawl released their second album Sirocco in 1981, which became a No. 1 album on the National charts. McDonough wrote or co-wrote five of its eleven tracks including two singles "Errol" and "Oh No Not You Again". He sang lead on "Oh No Not You Again" and on "Errol". "Errol" reached #18 on the Australian Singles Chart and was voted their third most popular song by listeners of Triple M in 2007.

1982 saw the release of Sons of Beaches with McDonough again writing or co-writing five of its tracks. This album also reached No. 1 but the singles had less success. After its release, Bill McDonough left the Crawl. He was briefly replaced by Graham Bidstrup on drums for the 1983 EP release Semantics. This four-track EP contained no tracks written by McDonough but did feature the No. 1 Australian Singles Chart success "Reckless (Don't Be So)". The live album Phalanx released later that same year saw drummer John Watson replacing Bidstrup. The Crawl's biggest overseas break came when Duran Duran took the band as support on an international tour.

=== Death ===
In the early months of 1984, McDonough decided to detox in an attempt to break away from alcohol and heroin addiction. McDonough booked into rehab with family support but then decided to not finish his program and returned home to follow a naturopathic procedure provided by a 'qualified' friend. Unfortunately this was an error of judgment as this treatment exacerbated his health situation rather than improve it, leading him to contract viral pneumonia and to be admitted to hospital in Melbourne, forcing Australian Crawl off the road. McDonough was in the Intensive Care Unit for many weeks, and improved enough to return home; but due to extreme physical deterioration from months in hospital and a weakened immune system, he contracted a secondary infection and was placed back into the Intensive Care Unit. Despite intense medical intervention, on 26 June 1984, he died at the age of 28.

=== Solo release/legacy ===
Prior to his death, Guy McDonough recorded a series of demos with his brother, Bill McDonough (drums), Sean Higgins (keyboards) and Nigel Spencer (bass) (all former bandmates in The Flatheads), Mick Hauser (saxophone) and Michael Bright (guitar). Bill McDonough then assembled the tapes and Wheatley Records issued Guy McDonough's posthumous album, My Place, in April 1985. The singles were "My Place" / "Things Don't Seem" and "What's in it For Me" / "Hook, Line and Sinker". Seven of the tracks from My Place were later remastered and released in 1996 as part of the Australian Crawl compilation Lost & Found. Compilers and producers of Lost & Found were Bill McDonough and Peter Blyton.

== Discography ==
=== Studio albums ===
List of albums, with Australian chart positions
Title	Album details	Peak chart positions
Title	Album details	AUS
My Place	Released: April 1985; Format: LP, Cassette; Label: Wheatley Records (WRLP 1010)	52

=== Singles ===
List of singles, with Australian chart positions
Year	Title	Peak chart positions	Album
Year	Title	AUS	Album
1985	"My Place"	76	My Place
1985	"What's in It for Me?"	–	My Place
