= Between a Rock and a Hard Place (Australian Crawl album) =

Studio album by Australian Crawl
- Released: July 1985
- Genre: Rock
- Length: 43:24
- Label: Freestyle, EMI
- Producer: Adam Kidron

Australian Crawl chronology
Crawl File (1984)	Between a Rock and a Hard Place (1985)	The Final Wave (1986)

Singles from Between a Rock and a Hard Place
- 1. "Two Can Play" Released: June 1985; 2. "If This Is Love" Released: September 1985; 3. "Trouble Spot Rock" Released: November 1985; 4. "Two Hearts" Released: January 1986

Between a Rock and a Hard Place was the final studio album from Australian rock band Australian Crawl. It was produced by English producer Adam Kidron (Ian Dury, Cabaret Voltaire, Aztec Camera).

Disappointed with sales, the band was ready to split but had to go out on tour for the next year to pay off the enormous $400,000 cost of producing the album.

== Track listing ==
All songs were written by James Reyne, except where otherwise noted.

1. "Two Can Play" (Simon Hussey, James Reyne) – 3:48
2. "I'd Do It" – 3:33
3. "Divers Down" – 3:07
4. "If This Is Love" – 3:26
5. "Two Hearts" (Simon Hussey, James Reyne) – 3:55
6. "Trouble Spot Rock" – 4:46
7. "You Told Me" (Simon Hussey, James Reyne) – 3:06
8. "My Day at the Beach" – 3:51
9. "Always the Way" (Simon Hussey, James Reyne) – 5:37
10. "Newly Weds in the Morning" – 3:07
11. "Land of Hope and Glory" – 5:08

== Personnel ==
Credits (taken from album's back cover and liner notes):

=== Australian Crawl ===
- James Reyne – vocals, rhythm guitars (tracks 1, 3–4 and 7–8), guitars (tracks 2 and 10), acoustic guitars (tracks 3–4 and 6), marimba (track 1), harp (track 10), saxophones (track 10)
- Brad Robinson – keyboards (tracks 1, 3–9 and 11), clavinet (track 2), synthesizer (track 10), backing vocals (track 6)
- Simon Binks – guitars (tracks 1–9 and 11), guitar solo (track 10)
- John Watson – drums, timbales (track 7), marimba (track 11)

=== Additional musicians ===
- Harry Brus – bass, guitar (track 7)
- Mark Greig – guitars (tracks 2–3, 6, 9 and 11)
- John Barrett – saxophone
- John Courtney – trombone
- Rahmlee Michael Davis – trumpet
- Ric Formosa – guitar, brass arrangement
- Cheryl Freeman – background vocals
- Michael Harris – trumpet
- Bill Harrower – saxophone
- Chelli Jackson – background vocals
- Keith Johnson – saxophone
- Don Lock – trombone
- Peter Martin – saxophone
- Don Myrick – saxophone (alto)
- Mick O'Connor – organ (Hammond)
- Phenix Horns – brass
- Eddie Rayner – keyboards
- Pete Salt – trumpet
- Lui Lui Satterfield – trombone
- Bob Venier – trumpet
- Zan – background vocals
- Allan Zavod – piano
- Robert Price – background vocals

== Charts ==
Chart (1985)	Peak position
Australian (Kent Music Report)	11
