= Oh No Not You Again =

Single by Australian Crawl

from the album Sirocco
- A-side: "Oh No Not You Again"
- B-side: "Lakeside"
- Released: November 1981
- Genre: Pop/rock
- Label: EMI
- Songwriter: Guy McDonough
- Producer: Peter Dawkins

Australian Crawl singles chronology
"Errol" (1981)	"Oh No Not You Again" (1981)	"Shut Down" (1982)

"Oh No, Not You Again" is the third single by Australian rock band Australian Crawl from their 1981 studio album Sirocco. The song was written and sung by Guy McDonough, the band's rhythm guitarist, and was about "two young lovers who lived on the coast" whose relationship is disrupted by the man spending his nights "out on the town". It was produced by Peter Dawkins.

"Oh No Not You Again" was released in November, 1981 and featured a double A-side with "Lakeside". Despite the song's popularity, it was not featured on either of Australian Crawl's live albums. However, James Reyne did record an acoustic version with a more forlorn tone for his 2005 album And the Horse You Rode in On. The single reached #58 on the Australian Singles Charts in October, 1981.

== Track listing ==
1. "Oh No Not You Again" (Guy McDonough)
2. "Lakeside" (James Reyne)

== Charts ==
Chart (1981)	Peak position
Australian (Kent Music Report)	58

== Certifications ==
Certifications for "Oh No Not You Again"
Region	Certification	Certified units/sales
New Zealand (RMNZ)	Gold	15,000^{‡}
^{‡} Sales+streaming figures based on certification alone.
