= Reckless (Australian Crawl song) =

"Reckless (Don't Be So)"

Single by Australian Crawl

from the album Semantics
- Released: 19 September 1983
- Recorded: Rhinoceros Studios (Sydney)
- Genre: Rock
- Length: 5:23
- Label: EMI, Geffen
- Songwriter: James Reyne
- Producer: Mark Opitz

Australian Crawl singles chronology
"Runaway Girls" (1982)	"Reckless (Don't Be So)" (1983)	"Louie Louie" (1984)

"Reckless" (a.k.a. "Reckless (Don't Be So)" or "Reckless (Don't You Be So)") was a 1983 song from the EP Semantics by Australian band Australian Crawl. The song showed a change in the line-up of the band, with drummer Bill McDonough temporarily replaced by Graham Bidstrup (also on keyboards). After the EP was released, Bidstrup was replaced by John Watson (drums).

The EP Semantics charted on the Australian Singles Charts to reach No. 1, and consequently some sources list "Reckless" as a No. 1 single. It was written by lead singer and guitarist James Reyne. Listeners of Triple M voted "Reckless" the 39th best song of all time in 2007; it was the highest-placed Australian Crawl song. In 2025, it placed 39 in the Triple J Hottest 100 of Australian Songs.

The song's lyrics refer to locations in Sydney such as Manly and Circular Quay.

In Europe (including the United Kingdom) "Reckless" was released by Geffen Records as a single backed with "White Limbo"; it was also a track on the 1984 expanded LP version of Semantics.

Australian Crawl performed "Reckless" as one of their three songs for the Oz for Africa concert (1985). This was the Australian leg of the global Live Aid show organised by Midge Ure and Bob Geldof. The "Oz for Africa" concert was broadcast on MTV, but only performances by Australian band INXS were placed on the 20th Anniversary DVD collection.

== Cover versions ==
Fellow Australian artists Paul Kelly and the Coloured Girls performed "Reckless" for their 1988 double single EP release of Dumb Things, it was later credited to Paul Kelly and the Messengers for the 1992 CD Hidden Things.

During his solo career, Reyne recorded a different version of "Reckless" for Electric Digger Dandy (a.k.a. Any Day Above Ground) in 1991. He still performs the song during live concerts.

John Farnham covered the song for his 2005 covers album I Remember When I Was Young; he also covered the Crawl's song "Downhearted".

Melbourne-based DJs and producers Smash N Grab released "She Don't Like That" in 2005 with re-recorded vocals by James Reyne. The CD single had three versions: a radio edit, an extended edit and a club mix.

== Misheard lyric ==
Readers of lyrics websites have suggested the line in the song about "A Russian sub beneath the Arctic" is a mondegreen in which "sub" has often been transcribed wrongly as "sun".

== Track listing ==
European Single

1. "Reckless (Don't You Be So)" (James Reyne) – 5:23
2. "White Limbo" (Simon Binks) – 4:03

== Personnel ==
=== Australian Crawl ===
- James Reyne – lead vocals, keyboards, guitar
- Simon Binks – lead guitar
- Paul "Tubbs" Williams – bass guitar
- Guy McDonough – backing vocals, rhythm guitar
- Brad Robinson – rhythm guitar
- Graham "Buzz" Bidstrup – drums, keyboards

=== Additional credits ===
- Andrew Thompson – saxophone
- Rosemary Westbrook – double bass on "Reckless"
- Engineer – David Nicholas
- Producer – Mark Opitz

== Charts ==
=== Weekly charts ===
Weekly chart performance for "Reckless"
Chart (1983)	Peak position
Australia (Kent Music Report)	1

=== Year-end charts ===
Year-end chart performance for "Reckless"
Chart (1983)	Position
Australia (Kent Music Report)	12

== Certifications ==
Region	Certification	Certified units/sales
Australia (ARIA)	Gold	35,000^{^}
New Zealand (RMNZ)	2× Platinum	60,000^{‡}
^{^} Shipments figures based on certification alone.^{‡} Sales+streaming figures based on certification alone.
