= Shut Down (Australian Crawl song) =

Single by Australian Crawl

from the album Sons of Beaches
- A-side: "Shut Down"
- B-side: "Creating Monsters"
- Released: June 1982
- Genre: Pop/Rock
- Length: 4:11
- Label: EMI
- Songwriter(s): Bill McDonough
- Producer(s): Mike Chapman

Australian Crawl singles chronology
"Oh No Not You Again" (1981)	"Shut Down" (1982)	"Daughters of the Northern Coast" (1982)

"Shut Down" is the first single released by Australian rock band Australian Crawl from their third studio album Sons of Beaches. The song was written by drummer Bill McDonough and features lead vocals by James Reyne. The B-side was the non-album track "Creating Monsters". It was produced by Mike Chapman.

"Shut Down" was released in June 1982 and reached #17 on the Australian Singles Chart in 1982.

== Track listing ==
1. "Shut Down" (Bill McDonough) - 4:11
2. "Creating Monsters" (James Reyne)

== Charts ==
Chart (1982)	Peak position
Australian (Kent Music Report)	17
