= Beautiful People (Australian Crawl song) =

Single by Australian Crawl

from the album The Boys Light Up
- A-side: "Beautiful People"
- B-side: "Man Crazy"
- Released: August 1979
- Recorded: AAV Studios (Melbourne, Victoria)
- Genre: Pop/rock
- Length: 2:56
- Label: EMI
- Songwriters: James Reyne, Mark Hudson
- Producer: David Briggs

Australian Crawl singles chronology
"Beautiful People" (1979)	"The Boys Light Up" (1980)

"Beautiful People" is the 1979 debut single released by Australian rock band Australian Crawl and the song later appeared on their debut album The Boys Light Up (1980). It was written by James Reyne and Mark Hudson, former bandmates.

The music video for "Beautiful People" was filmed in 1979 at the then dilapidated and graffitied (but now renovated and heritage-listed) Bellevue House, Glebe.

== Background ==
Australian Crawl caught the attention of Little River Band’s guitarist David Briggs, who helped them to a recording contract with EMI and produced their first single. "Beautiful People" was released in August, 1979 and peaked at No. 22 on the Australian Singles Chart.

The song satirised the vacuous elite of mid-1970s Melbourne's Toorak society:

I was just looking around at people who were putting on airs... It's pretension. It's everywhere, probably even more now. There's a complete culture surrounding it now, magazines devoted to it. It was a much simpler time, 1975.

— James Reyne,

In 1975, Reyne was living in South Yarra, whilst attending Monash University and playing drums for Archie Slammit and the Doors.

The Making of "Beautiful People" (1979) was a mini-documentary broadcast on Australian Broadcasting Corporation (ABC) TV pop show Countdown. The film featured Geoff Cox (who later hosted Coxy's Big Break) guiding viewers from the studio sessions to the pressing of the 7" vinyl, finishing with Australian Crawl's performance of the song on Countdown.

The Crawl made a memorable debut on Countdown performing "Beautiful People" because Reyne appeared with both arms encased in plaster. He was also shown in the official music video with his arms in plaster. He had been hit by a car in Swanston Street, Melbourne, breaking bones in both wrists, an episode chronicled in the song "Indisposed". Although "Beautiful People" only reached No. 22, it remains one of their most popular songs.

== Track listing ==
1. "Beautiful People" (James Reyne, Mark Hudson) – 2:56
2. "Man Crazy" (Reyne) – 3:40

== Charts ==
Chart (1979/80)	Peak position
Australian (Kent Music Report)	22
