= Errol (song) =

Single by Australian Crawl

from the album Sirocco
- A-side: "Errol"
- B-side: "Easy On Your Own"
- Released: September 1981
- Recorded: Studios 301 (Sydney, Australia)
- Genre: Pop/rock
- Length: 3:30
- Label: EMI
- Songwriter(s): James Reyne, Guy McDonough
- Producer(s): Peter Dawkins

Australian Crawl singles chronology
| "Things Don't Seem" (1981) | "Errol" (1981) | "Oh No Not You Again" (1981) |

"Errol" is the second single by Australian surf rock band Australian Crawl taken from their 1981 album Sirocco. The song was written by James Reyne and Guy McDonough and sung by McDonough instead of regular lead-vocalist Reyne, and is a lyrical biography about Australian-born actor Errol Flynn. It was produced by Peter Dawkins.

The music video was filmed on the Gold Coast, Queensland.

"Errol" was released in September 1981 and reached #18 on the Australian Singles Charts in October 1981. It was voted their third-most-popular song by listeners of Triple M in 2007.

B-side "Easy on Your Own" was written by Simon Binks and Brad Robinson of The Crawl together with Australian actress Kerry Armstrong. Robinson and Armstrong were married; Armstrong was later an Australian Film Institute Award winner.

In December 1982, the then-nascent Australian new wave band This Is Serious Mum parodied the song as "Yassa Ara-Thin-A-Go-Go". The recording would be released on 29 July 2002.

In January 2018, as part of Triple M's "Ozzest 100", the 'most Australian' songs of all time, "Errol" was ranked number 52.

== Track listing ==
1. "Errol" (James Reyne, Guy McDonough) – 3:30
2. "Easy on Your Own" (Simon Binks, Brad Robinson, Kerry Armstrong) – 3:49

== Charts ==
| Chart (1981) | Peak position |
|---|---|
| Australian (Kent Music Report) | 18 |
