= The Boys Light Up (song) =

Single by Australian Crawl

from the album The Boys Light Up
- A-side: "The Boys Light Up"
- B-side: "Boot Hill"
- Released: April 1980
- Genre: Australian pub rock
- Length: 4:41
- Label: EMI
- Songwriter: James Reyne
- Producer: David Briggs

Australian Crawl singles chronology
"Beautiful People" (1979)	"The Boys Light Up" (1980)	"Downhearted" (1980)

"The Boys Light Up" is the second single and title track released by Australian rock band Australian Crawl from their debut album The Boys Light Up (1980). The song was written by lead singer James Reyne

Australian Crawl's producer David Briggs was the Little River Band's guitarist, and had helped them to a recording contract with EMI. "The Boys Light Up" peaked at #22 on the Australian Singles Chart.

The song contains the neologism "dorseted", to rhyme with "corseted".

"People aren't used to hearing 'Dorseted', and it's not actually a word - it's from the Dorset Gardens - I'm trying to be as suburban as possible, and it rhymed with 'corseted'." - James Reyne, 2003

The single was almost banned from radio play and some TV shows due to its explicit lyrics. Reyne makes observations about cocktail parties that his parents attended, including where one of his teachers was caught in the garden with someone else's wife. Many listeners believe the chorus lyrics are about smoking marijuana but Reyne has stated that it was about smoking tobacco cigarettes when he was in Form Four at The Peninsula School.

In an interview with Peter Thompson on the ABC Television program Talking Heads, broadcast on 31 May 2010, Reyne answered a question on what the song was about, "Well, really? It's about fellatio, but[...] it was also about the sort of burgeoning, you know, kind of... new middle class, the new money and the new money aspirational... uh... class."

== Track listing ==
1. "The Boys Light Up" (James Reyne) - 4:41
2. "Boot Hill" (Reyne) - 2:36

== Charts ==
Chart (1980)	Peak position
Australian (Kent Music Report)	22

== Certifications ==
Certifications for "The Boys Light Up"
Region	Certification	Certified units/sales
New Zealand (RMNZ)	3× Platinum	90,000^{‡}
^{‡} Sales+streaming figures based on certification alone.

== Pop Culture ==
In September 2023, Australian rapper ChillinIT released a track titled "Boys Light Up" for his mixtape 420DNA. The song heavily samples and features backing vocals from the original Australian Crawl song. The track debuted at #6 on the Aria Hip Hop and R&B Singles Chart.
