= Downhearted =

Single by Australian Crawl

from the album The Boys Light Up
- B-side: "Way I've Been"
- Released: June 1980
- Genre: Pop rock
- Length: 3:09
- Label: EMI
- Songwriters: Sean Higgins, Guy McDonough, Bill McDonough
- Producer: David Briggs

Australian Crawl singles chronology
"The Boys Light Up" (1980)	"Downhearted" (1980)	"Things Don't Seem" (1981)

"Downhearted" is the third single released by Australian surf rock band Australian Crawl from their debut album The Boys Light Up. The song was written by Sean Higgins, Guy McDonough and Bill McDonough. All three songwriters had been bandmates in the Flatheads, but at the time only Bill McDonough was a member of Australian Crawl. It was produced by David Briggs.

"Downhearted" was released in June 1980 and reached number 12 on the Australian Singles Chart in July 1980.

Different B-sides were released in different markets. Australian B-side was "Way I've Been" written by Australian Crawl member Brad Robinson and his father James Robinson. James Robinson was a Federal Arbitration Court Justice. Canadian B-side was "Indisposed" was co-written by the Robinsons with James Reyne and Bill McDonough. The song describes the car accident which resulted in Reyne breaking both wrists immediately before they recorded their first single "Beautiful People" (1979). The B-side for the UK release was "Letter From Zimbabwe" (Reyne).

== Covers ==
"Downhearted" was covered by Dutch prog rock band Solution and appeared on their 1982 album Runaway with an added bridge to the song. Australian pop singer John Farnham sang it on his 2005 covers album I Remember When I Was Young.

== Track listing ==
1. "Downhearted" (Sean Higgins, Guy McDonough, Bill McDonough) – 3:09
2. "Way I've Been" (Brad Robinson, James Robinson) – 2:17

== Charts ==
=== Weekly charts ===
Chart (1980)	Peak position
Australian (Kent Music Report)	12

=== Year-end charts ===
Chart (1980)	Position
Australia (Kent Music Report)	96

== Certifications ==
Certifications for "Downhearted"
Region	Certification	Certified units/sales
New Zealand (RMNZ)	Gold	15,000^{‡}
^{‡} Sales+streaming figures based on certification alone.
