= Daryl Braithwaite discography =

- Studio albums: 7
- Compilation albums: 6
- Singles: 26

The discography of Australian rock and pop singer-songwriter Daryl Braithwaite.

== Albums ==
=== Studio albums ===
List of albums, with selected chart positions and certifications
Title	Album details	Peak chart positions	Certifications
Title	Album details	AUS	Certifications
Out on the Fringe	Released: 1979; Format: LP, cassette; Label: Infinity	—	
Edge	Released: 4 November 1988; Format: LP, CD, cassette; Label: CBS	1	ARIA: 4× Platinum
Rise	Released: 23 November 1990; Format: LP, CD, cassette; Label: CBS	3	ARIA: 4× Platinum
Taste the Salt	Released: 8 November 1993; Format: CD, cassette; Label: CBS	13	
Snapshot	Released: 2005; Format: CD, DD; Label: Daryl Braithwaite	—	
The Lemon Tree	Released: 4 October 2008; Format: CD, DD; Label: Liberation	71	
Forever the Tourist	Released: 4 October 2013; Format: CD, DD; Label: Sony Music Australia	47	
"—" denotes releases that did not chart, or have no reliable sources of charting information.

=== Compilation albums ===
List of compilation albums, with selected chart positions
Title	Album details	Peak chart positions
Title	Album details	AUS
Daryl Braithwaite... Best Of	Released: 1978; Format: LP, cassette; Label: Razzle	—
Higher Than Hope	Released: 1991; Format: LP, cassette; US and Europe release; Label: Epic	—N/a
Six Moons: The Best of 1988–1994	Released: 11 November 1994; Format: CD, cassette; Label: Columbia	31
Afterglow: The Essential Collection 1971–1994	Released: 22 July 2002; Format: CD, digital download; Label: Raven	—
The Essential Daryl Braithwaite	Released: 23 July 2007; Format: CD, digital download; Label: Sony BMG	—
Days Go By	Released: 24 November 2017; Format: CD, digital download; Label: Sony Music Australia (88985496912)	5
"—" denotes releases that did not chart, or have no reliable sources of charting information.

== Singles ==
Year	Title	Chart positions						Certifications	Album
Year	Title	AUS	NOR	NZ	SWE	UK	US	Certifications	Album
1974	"You're My World"	1	—	—	—	—	—	AUS: Gold	Daryl Braithwaite... Best Of
1975	"Cavalry"	13	—	—	—	—	—		Daryl Braithwaite... Best Of
1976	"Old Sid"	9	—	—	—	—	—		Daryl Braithwaite... Best Of
1977	"Love Has No Pride" / "Fly Away" (double A-side)	5	—	—	—	—	—		Daryl Braithwaite... Best Of
1977	"Afterglow (Of Your Love)"	37	—	—	—	—	—		Daryl Braithwaite... Best Of
1978	"If You Walked Away"	14	—	—	—	—	—		Daryl Braithwaite... Best Of
1979	"Why Do I Break It Up?"	35	—	—	—	—	—		Daryl Braithwaite... Best Of
1979	"Love Like a Child"	69	—	—	—	—	—		Out on the Fringe
1980	"Prove Your Love"	—	—	—	—	—	—		Out on the Fringe
1988	"As the Days Go By"	11	—	49	—	144	—		Edge
1988	"All I Do"	23	—	—	—	—	—		Edge
1989	"One Summer"	8	5	—	4	—	—	ARIA: Gold	Edge
1989	"Let Me Be"	26	—	—	—	—	—		Edge
1989	"Sugar Train"	75	—	—	—	—	—		Edge
1990	"Rise"	23	—	—	—	—	—		Rise
1991	"The Horses"	1	—	—	—	—	—	ARIA: 10× Platinum	Rise
1991	"Higher Than Hope"	28	—	—	—	—	47		Rise
1991	"Don't Hold Back Your Love"	55	—	—	—	—	—		Rise
1992	"Nothing to Lose"	100	—	—	—	—	—		Rise
1993	"The World as It Is"	35	—	—	—	—	—		Taste the Salt
1994	"Barren Ground"	61	—	—	—	—	—		Taste the Salt
1994	"Breaking the Rules"	—	—	—	—	—	—		Taste the Salt
1994	"How Can I Be Sure?"	55	—	—	—	—	—		Six Moons
1996	"When That Flame Burns" (featuring Lisa Bade)	—	—	—	—	—	—		Singles only
2010	"Beautiful Feeling"	—	—	—	—	—	—		Singles only
2013	"Not Too Late"	—	—	—	—	—	—		Forever the Tourist
2020	"Love Songs"	43	—	—	—	—	—	ARIA: Gold	Non-album singles
2024	"It's You"	—	—	—	—	—	—		Non-album singles
"—" denotes the single did not chart or was not released in that country

=== Other singles ===
List of singles as featured artist, with selected chart positions and certifications
Year	Title	Peak chart positions
Year	Title	AUS
1977	"Rock Around the Clock" (Released to commemorate the 21st Anniversary of the release of "Rock Around the Clock") (with Glenn Shorrock, Frankie J. Holden, John Paul Young, Daryl Braithwaite and Graeme Strachan)	—
1988	"You're Not Alone" (As Australian Olympians)	18
2017	"With a Little Help from My Friends" (Various artists - as Sony Music All-Stars)	—

== Other songs ==
Non-album/single songs on various artists albums.
Year	Song	Album
1984	No Angels Tonight	Street Hero Soundtrack
1994	Golden Miles	Earth Music
1995	Once in Royal David's City	The Spirit of Christmas 1995
2000	Duende (Original Version)+	Olympic Record
2002	We Care	NBN Telethon 2002
2006	The Little Drummer Boy	The Spirit of Christmas 2006
2017	Up On The Roof	Beautiful - A Tribute To Carole King

+Duende was re-recorded for the Snapshot album

== See also ==
- Sherbet
  - Sherbet discography
- Company of Strangers
