= Six Moons: The Best of 1988–1994 =

Greatest hits album by Daryl Braithwaite
- Released: 11 November 1994
- Recorded: 1988–1994
- Genre: Pop rock, Soft rock
- Label: Columbia Records
- Producer: Simon Hussey, Robyn Smith, Ross Fraser

Daryl Braithwaite chronology
Taste the Salt (1993)	Six Moons: The Best of 1988–1994 (1994)	The Lemon Tree (album) (2002)

"Six Moons: The Best of 1988–1994" is a greatest hits album by Australian singer-songwriter Daryl Braithwaite. The album includes tracks taken from taken albums Edge, Rise and Taste the Salt and three new tracks, "How Can I Be Sure", "Blue Hills" and "Escape From Reality" all recorded in July and August 1994. The album peaked at number 31 in Australia.

== Track listing ==
No.	Title	Writer(s)	Album	Length
1.	"As the Days Go By (Extended Mix) "	Ian Thomas (Canadian musician); Ian Thomas	Edge	5:07
2.	"All I Do"	Thomas	Edge	4:05
3.	"One Summer"	Daryl Braithwaite	Edge	3:42
4.	"Let Me Be"	David Reyne; Simon Hussey	Edge	5:35
5.	"Sugar Train"	Jef Scott	Edge	3:42
6.	"Rise"	Paul Read; Danny McCarthy	Rise	3:56
7.	"The Horses"	Rickie Lee Jones; Walter Becker	Rise	4:15
8.	"Higher Than Hope" (Single Mix) "	Braithwaite; Hussey	Rise	4:26
9.	"Don't Hold Back Your Love"	David Tyson; Richard Page; Gerald O'Brien	Rise	5:07
10.	"Nothing To Lose"	Mike Caen; Steve Bull	Rise	4:08
11.	"The World as It Is"	Tina Harris; Daniel O'Brien	Taste the Salt	3:51
12.	"Barren Ground"	Bruce Hornsby; John Hornsby	Taste the Salt	5:14
13.	"How Can I Be Sure"	Felix Cavaliere; Edward Brigati Jr.	new recording	3:33
14.	"Blue Hills"	Tim Finn	new recording	4:38
15.	"Escape From Reality"	Roger Mason	new recording	5:02

== Charts ==
Chart (1994)	Peak position
Australian Albums (ARIA)	31

== Musicians ==
Simon Hussey, Jeff Scott, David Hussey, John Farnham, Glenn Braithwaite, John Watson, Scott Griffiths Chuck Hargreaves, John Corniola, Andy Cichon, Brett Kingman, Laurence Maddy, Margaret Urlich, The Brasstards, Alex Pertout, Jeremy Alsop, Tommy Emmanuel, Stuart Fraser, Lisa Edwards, Nikki Nicoles, Richard Pleasance, Willie Zygier, Nicky Karawana.
