= Days Go By (Daryl Braithwaite album) =

Greatest hits album by Daryl Braithwaite
- Released: 24 November 2017
- Recorded: 1974–2017
- Genres: Pop rock, Soft rock
- Label: Sony Music Australia

Daryl Braithwaite chronology
Forever the Tourist (2015)	Days Go By (2017)

Days Go By (subtitled The Definitive Greatest Hits Collection) is a compilation album by Australian rock and pop singer Daryl Braithwaite, released in November 2017 through Sony Music Australia to coincide with Braithwaite's induction into the ARIA Hall of Fame.

The album spans Braithwaite's career highlights including his debut solo single, "You're My World" and features brand new music.

== Track listing ==
CD1

No.	Title	Writer(s)	Album	Length
1.	"As the Days Go By"	Ian Thomas (Canadian musician); Ian Thomas	Edge	4:03
2.	"The Horses"	Rickie Lee Jones; Walter Becker	Rise	4:16
3.	"When We Were Kings" (with Melinda Jackson)	Andrew Marvell; Arnold Roman; Amy Powers	new recording	3:48
4.	"Up On the Roof"	Gerry Goffin; Carole King	Beautiful - A Tribute to Carole King	3:10
5.	"If You Leave Me Now"	Peter Cetera	new recording	3:59
6.	"In Your Eyes"	Peter Gabriel	new recording	4:15
7.	"Motor's Too Fast" (with James Reyne)	James Reyne; Simon Hussey	new recording	3:57
8.	"One Summer"	Braithwaite	Edge	3:45
9.	"Let Me Be"	David Reyne; Hussey	Edge	5:37
10.	"Not Too Late"	Braithwaite; Lindsay Rimes; Simon Shapiro	Forever the Tourist	3:46
11.	"Rise"	P. Read; D. McCarthy	Rise	3:56
12.	"Higher Than Hope"	Braithwaite; Hussey	Rise	4:59
13.	"All I Do"	Thomas	Edge	4:07
14.	"Ain't No Angels" (credited to Company of Strangers)	Jef Scott; Hussey	Company of Strangers	4:03

CD2

No.	Title	Writer(s)	Album	Length
1.	"You're My World"	Umberto Bindi; Gino Paoli; Carl Sigman	Daryl Braithwaite... Best Of	3:09
2.	"If You Walked Away"	David Pomeranz	Daryl Braithwaite... Best Of	3:46
3.	"Old Sid"	Warren Morgan	Daryl Braithwaite... Best Of	3:25
4.	"Love Like a Child"	Stephen Halter	Out on the Fringe	3:59
5.	"Princess"	Braithwaite	B-side to "You're My World"	3:28
6.	"Beautiful Feeling"	Braithwaite; Oliver Jones	Forever the Tourist	3:31
7.	"Don't Hold Back Your Love"	David Tyson; Richard Page; G. O'Brien	Rise	5:09
8.	"Time"	Braithwaite	B-side to "Old Sid"	2:45
9.	"Afterglow (of Your Love)"	Steve Marriott; Ronnie Lane	Daryl Braithwaite... Best Of	3:29
10.	"Cavalry"	Braithwaite; Tony Mitchell	Daryl Braithwaite... Best Of	3:35
11.	"Love Has No Pride"	Eric Kaz; Libby Titus	Daryl Braithwaite... Best Of	3:23
12.	"Sugar Train"	Jef Scott	Edge	3:43
13.	"Where the Poor Boys Dance"	Lulu; Billy Lawrie; David Tyson	Snapshot	4:24
14.	"Duende"	Braithwaite; Andrew Gibbs	Snapshot	4:37

== Charts ==
=== Weekly charts ===
Chart (2017)	Peak position
Australian Albums (ARIA)	5

=== Year-end charts ===
Chart (2017)	Position
Australian Albums (ARIA)	66

== Release history ==
Region	Date	Format	Label	Catalogue
Australia	24 November 2017	CD; digital download	Sony Music Australia	88985496912
