= Higher Than Hope (album) =

Compilation album by Daryl Braithwaite
- Released: April 5, 1991
- Recorded: 1988−90
- Studios: Metropolis Audio, Melbourne, Australia
- Genres: Pop rock, Soft rock
- Label: Epic Records
- Producer: Simon Hussey

Daryl Braithwaite chronology
Rise (1990)	Higher Than Hope (1991)	Taste The Salt (1993)

Professional ratings
Review scores
Source	Rating
Allmusic	2/5 stars

Higher Than Hope is a compilation album by Australian singer-songwriter, Daryl Braithwaite released in United States of America and Europe in April 1991. The album includes the track "Higher Than Hope", which reached number 47 on the Billboard Hot 100.

== Track listing ==
1. "Higher Than Hope" (Simon Hussey, Daryl Braithwaite) - 4:26
2. "Nothing to Lose" (Mike Caen, Steve Bull) - 4:09
3. "As the Days Go By" (Ian Thomas) – 4:04
4. "Waters Rising" (Simon Hussey) - 4:25
5. "All I Do" (Ian Thomas) – 4:06
6. "One Summer" (Daryl Braithwaite) – 3:43
7. "Don't Hold Back Your Love" (David Tyson, Richard Page, Gerald O'Brien) - 5:09
8. "The Horses" (Rickie Lee Jones, Walter Becker) - 4:15
9. "I Can See Higher Than Before" (Daryl Braithwaite) - 3:49
10. "Goodbye Blue Sky" (Simon Hussey, James Reyne) - 3:53
- Note: tracks 1,2,4, 7-10 are taken from the album Rise.
- Note: tracks 3,5,6 are taken from the album Edge.

== Release history ==
Country	Date	Label	Format	Catalog
United States / Europe	1991	Epic Records	CD	468295 1
