= Don't Hold Back Your Love =

1990 single by Hall & Oates

- European picture sleeve

Single by Hall & Oates

from the album Change of Season
- B-side: "Change of Season"
- Released: December 1990
- Recorded: 1990
- Genre: Acoustic rock; pop rock; soft rock
- Length: 5:14 (album version); 4:39 (single edit)
- Label: Arista
- Songwriters: David Tyson; Richard Page; Gerald O'Brien
- Producer: David Tyson

Hall & Oates singles chronology
"So Close" (1990)	"Don't Hold Back Your Love" (1990)	"Everywhere I Look" (1991)

"Don't Hold Back Your Love" is a song by the American pop duo Hall & Oates. It was released in December 1990 by Arista Records as the second single from their fourteenth studio album, Change of Season (1990). It was written and produced by Canadian music producer David Tyson, alongside co-writers Richard Page and Gerald O'Brien. Daryl Hall performed the lead vocals of the song. It was the only song on the album to be produced by Tyson.

"Don't Hold Back Your Love" peaked at No. 41 on the Billboard Hot 100 and No. 4 on the Adult Contemporary chart. In Canada, it peaked at No. 10 on the RPM Top Singles chart and No. 3 on the Adult Contemporary chart. It ranked 78th and 44th on the respective year-end Canadian charts.

The producer, Tyson, won the Juno Award for Songwriter of the Year for his composition on the song. SOCAN named "Don't Hold Back Your Love" as one of the most played songs in Canada.

== Track listing ==
1. "Don't Hold Back Your Love" - 4:39
2. "Change of Season" - 5:42

== Personnel ==
=== Hall & Oates ===
- Daryl Hall – lead vocals, backing vocals, acoustic piano, synthesizers, electric guitar, acoustic guitar, mandolin, mandola, tambourine
- John Oates – backing vocals, electric guitar, acoustic guitar, bongos, clay drum

=== Guests ===
- Bob Mayo – keyboards, Hammond B3 organ, backing vocals
- Mike Klvana – additional synthesizer programming
- Pete Moshay – programming, sequencing, tambourine
- Tom "T-Bone" Wolk – Wurlitzer electric piano, electric guitar, acoustic guitar, bass guitar, percussion, tambourine, backing vocals
- Jimmy Rip – electric guitar, acoustic guitar
- Mike Braun – drums, percussion
- Jimmy Bralower – Akai MPC60 drum programming
- Charlie DeChant – saxophone
- David Tyson – keyboards, bass guitar
- Buzz Feiten – guitars
- Michael Thompson – guitars
- Pat Mastelotto – drums
- Wendy Fraser – backing vocals
- Portia Griffin – backing vocals

== Charts ==
=== Weekly charts ===
Chart (1990–1991)	Peak position
Canada Top Singles (RPM)	10
Canada Adult Contemporary (RPM)	3
US Billboard Hot 100	41
US Adult Contemporary (Billboard)	4
US Cash Box Top 100	33

=== Year-end charts ===
Chart (1991)	Peak position
Canada Top Singles (RPM)	78
Canada Adult Contemporary (RPM)	44

== Daryl Braithwaite cover ==
"Don't Hold Back Your Love"

Single by Daryl Braithwaite

from the album Rise
- B-side: "One Summer" (live); "Sugar Train" (live)
- Released: August 19, 1991
- Recorded: 1990
- Length: 5:09
- Label: Columbia
- Songwriters: David Tyson; Richard Page; Gerald O'Brien
- Producer: Simon Hussey

Daryl Braithwaite singles chronology
"Higher Than Hope" (1991)	"Don't Hold Back Your Love" (1991)	"Nothing to Lose" (1992)

Australian singer Daryl Braithwaite recorded a cover of "Don't Hold Back Your Love" and released it on his third studio album, Rise (1990). It was released on August 19, 1991, as the fourth single from the album. It was produced by Simon Hussey. Braithwaite's cover was issued on Columbia Records. It peaked at No. 55 on the ARIA Charts.

=== Track listing ===
1. "Don't Hold Back Your Love"
2. "One Summer" (live)
3. "Sugar Train" (live)

=== Personnel ===
- Daryl Braithwaite – vocals
- Simon Hussey – keyboards, electric piano, drum machine
- Jef Scott – acoustic guitars, electric guitars, resonator guitar
- Andy Cichon – bass guitar
- John Watson – drums
- Scott Griffiths – keyboards, piano, Hammond organ
- Alex Pertout – percussion

=== Charts ===
Chart (1991)	Peak position
Australia (ARIA)	55
