= The Lemon Tree (album) =

2008 album by Daryl Braithwaite

Live album by Daryl Braithwaite
- Released: October 4, 2008
- Recorded: June 2008
- Genres: Pop rock, Soft rock
- Length: 46:59
- Label: Liberation Music

Daryl Braithwaite chronology
| The Essential Daryl Braithwaite (2007) | The Lemon Tree (2008) | Forever the Tourist (2013) |

The Lemon Tree is an acoustic live album by Daryl Braithwaite recorded in June 2008 and released in October 2008 as part of the Liberation Music "Blue Acoustic" series. It peaked at number 71 in Australia in November 2008. The album includes tracks from Braithwaite's entire career. The album was re-released in 2012 under the title Greatest Hits Acoustic.

== Review ==
"The Lemon Tree sparkles with the energy and immediacy of a unique and very intimate live performance.", mentions JB Hi-Fi.

According to the ABC, The Lemon Tree was "devoid of clutter", with Braithwaite's "striking voice" demonstrating "the ease with which he communicates in song."

== Track listing ==
1. "As the Days Go By" - 4:05
2. "Rise" - 3:45
3. "Free The People" - 2:20
4. "Higher Than Hope" - 3:19
5. "These Days" - 4:02
6. "Howzat" - 3:50
7. "The Horses" - 3:56
8. "You're My World" - 3:01
9. "My Man" (vocals by Dale Kruse) - 3:21
10. "One Summer"
11. "I Haven't Met You Yet" (vocals by David Campbell) - 3:30
12. "Old Sid" - 3:17
13. "Waters Rising" - 501

== Charts ==
| Chart (2008) | Position |
|---|---|
| Australian (ARIA Charts) | 71 |
