= Forever the Tourist =

Studio album by Daryl Braithwaite
- Released: 4 October 2013
- Genre: Pop rock; soft rock
- Length: 30:33
- Label: Sony Music Australia
- Producer: Oliver Jones; Lindsay Ryan

Daryl Braithwaite chronology
The Lemon Tree (2008)	Forever the Tourist (2013)	Days Go By (2017)

Forever the Tourist is a studio album by Daryl Braithwaite released in October 2013. It was his first album of original material since Snapshot in 2005. It was released through Sony Music Australia who had re-signed Braithwaite after releasing the multi-platinum albums Edge (1988) and Rise (1990). He promoted the album was a number of concerts throughout October 2013.

== Background ==
In 2008, Braithwaite began a songwriting collaboration with Oliver Jones (brother of Savage Garden's Daniel Jones). Braithwaite explained, "We met through mutual friends, and hit it off quickly." By mid-2012, the new songs reached Denis Handlin, chairman and CEO of Sony Music Australia, who signed Braithwaite.

== Track listing ==
1. "Forever the Tourist" (Oliver Jones) – 4:25
2. "Not Too Late" (Daryl Braithwaite, Lindsay Rimes, Simon Shapiro) – 3:44
3. "Beautiful Feeling" (Daryl Braithwaite, Oliver Jones) – 3:27
4. "Good People" (Oliver Jones) – 3:31
5. "Is This Love" (Daryl Braithwaite, Scott Kingman) – 3:34
6. "Perfect Day" (Daryl Braithwaite, Oliver Jones) – 3:59
7. "See You Smile" (Daryl Braithwaite, Oliver Jones) – 3:47
8. "Mountain" (Daryl Braithwaite, Oliver Jones) – 4:06

== Charts ==
Chart (2013)	Peak position
Australian Albums (ARIA)	47

== Release history ==
Region	Date	Format	Label	Catalogue
Australia	4 October 2013	CD; digital download	Sony Music Australia	88883779032
