= Change of Season =

1990 studio album by Hall & Oates

Studio album by Daryl Hall & John Oates
- Released: October 9, 1990
- Recorded: Summer 1989–1990
- Studios: Various: A-Pawling Studio (Dutchess County); The Hit Factory (New York City); Studio 55 (Los Angeles); Summa Sound (Los Angeles); Cove City Sound Studios (Glen Cove); New River Studios (Fort Lauderdale); The Music Palace (West Hempstead); Sunset Sound Factory (Los Angeles); Westlake Audio (Los Angeles); Conway Recording Studios (Los Angeles); Orca Studios (Los Angeles); Chapel Studio (Los Angeles)
- Genre: Pop rock
- Length: 56:42
- Label: Arista
- Producers: Daryl Hall; John Oates; Tom "T-Bone" Wolk; Danny Kortchmar; Jon Bon Jovi; David Tyson; Dave Stewart; Ric Wake

Daryl Hall & John Oates chronology
Ooh Yeah! (1988)	Change of Season (1990)	Looking Back – The Best of Daryl Hall + John Oates (1991)

Singles from Change of Season
- 1. "So Close" Released: September 1990; 2. "Don't Hold Back Your Love" Released: December 1990; 3. "Everywhere I Look" Released: January 14, 1991; 4. "Starting All Over Again" Released: 1991

Change of Season is the fourteenth studio album by American pop rock duo Daryl Hall & John Oates. The album was released on October 9, 1990 by Arista Records. The lead single "So Close", which was produced by Bon Jovi singer Jon Bon Jovi, peaked at No. 11 on the Billboard Hot 100 and was their last Top 40 hit, while the second single "Don't Hold Back Your Love" just missed the Top 40, reaching No. 41. It was their second and final album for Arista.

Professional ratings
Review scores
Source	Rating
AllMusic	2/5 stars
The Rolling Stone Album Guide	2.5/5 stars
People	(favourable)

== Track listing ==
All tracks are produced by Daryl Hall, John Oates, and Tom "T-Bone" Wolk, except where noted.

Side one
No.	Title	Writer(s)	Producer(s)	Length
1.	"So Close"	Hall; George Green; Jon Bon Jovi; Danny Kortchmar	Kortchmar; Bon Jovi	4:40
2.	"Starting All Over Again"	Phillip Mitchell		4:06
3.	"Sometimes a Mind Changes"	Hall		4:09
4.	"Change of Season"	Oates; Bobby Mayo		5:43
5.	"I Ain't Gonna Take It This Time"	Hall		3:55
6.	"Everywhere I Look"	Hall		4:24

Side two
No.	Title	Writer(s)	Producer(s)	Length
7.	"Give It Up (Old Habits)"	Terry Britten; Graham Lyle	Ric Wake	4:02
8.	"Don't Hold Back Your Love"	Richard Page; Gerald O'Brien; David Tyson	Tyson	5:14
9.	"Halfway There"	Hall		5:31
10.	"Only Love"	Oates; Jo Cang		4:37
11.	"Heavy Rain"	David A. Stewart	Hall; Stewart	5:26
12.	"So Close (Unplugged version)"	Hall; Green; Bon Jovi; Kortchmar		4:54

== Personnel ==
=== The Band ===
- Daryl Hall – lead vocals (1–9, 11, 12), backing vocals, keyboards, synthesizers, electric guitar, acoustic guitar, mandolin, mandola, tambourine, arrangements
- John Oates – lead vocals (2, 4, 10), backing vocals, electric guitar, acoustic guitar, bongos, clay drum, arrangements
- Tom "T-Bone" Wolk – electric guitar, acoustic guitar, bass (2–6, 8–10), Wurlitzer piano, percussion, tambourine, backing vocals, arrangements
- Jimmy Rip – electric guitar, acoustic guitar
- Bobby Mayo – Hammond B-3 organ, synthesizers, backing vocals
- Mike Braun – drums (2–6, 9–12), percussion
- Charlie DeChant – saxophone
- Jimmy Bralower – Akai MPC-60 drum programming
- Mike Klvana – additional synthesizer programming
- Pete Moshay – sequencing, programming, tambourine
- Arif Mardin – string arrangements (2, 4), conductor (2, 4)

==== Additional musicians ====
- Benmont Tench – keyboards (1)
- Rich Tancredi – keyboards (7)
- Dean Kraus – keyboards (7)
- David Tyson – keyboards (8), bass (8)
- Danny Kortchmar – guitar (1)
- Waddy Wachtel – guitar (1)
- Bob Cadway – guitar (7)
- Buzz Feiten – guitar (8)
- Michael Thompson – guitar (8)
- David A. Stewart – guitar (11)
- Randy Jackson – bass (1)
- Doug Stegmeyer – bass (7)
- Bob Glaub – bass (11)
- Kenny Aronoff – drums (1), percussion (1)
- Joey Franco – drums (7)
- Pat Mastelotto – drums (8)
- Jesse Levy – cello (2, 4)
- Olivia Koppell – viola (2, 4)
- Regis Iandorio – violin (2, 4)
- Eileen Ivers – violin (9, 10)
- Susie Davis – backing vocals (2)
- Wendy Fraser – backing vocals (8)
- Portia Griffin – backing vocals (8)
- Siobhan Fahey – backing vocals (11)
- Marcella Detroit – backing vocals (11)
- Mary Cassidy – backing vocals (11)
- Toni Halliday – backing vocals (11)
- Nan Vernon – backing vocals (11)
- Ric Wake – arrangements (7)

=== Technical ===
- Produced by Daryl Hall (2–6, 9, 10–12), John Oates (2–6, 9, 10, 12), and Tom "T-Bone" Wolk (2–6, 9, 10, 12)
- Additional producers – Danny Kortchmar (1), Jon Bon Jovi (1), Ric Wake (7), David Tyson (8), and David A. Stewart (11)
- Production coordinators – Pete Moshay (2–6, 9, 10, 12), David Barratt (7), Shari Sutcliffe (8)
- Engineered by Ross Hogarth (1), Larry Alexander (2–6, 9, 10), Bob Cadway (7), Kevin Doyle (8), Duane Seykora (11)
- Additional engineers – David Knight and Greg Dromin (8)
- Assistant engineers – Pete Moshay (2–6, 9, 10) and Joe Pirrera (2–6, 9, 10); Dan Hetzel and Tom Yezzi (7); Tom Nellen, Charley Pollard, Andrew Raffi, Craig Porteils, and Bill Molina (8); Pat McDougal (11)
- Mixed by Paul Lani (1), Larry Alexander (2–6, 9, 10), Bob Cadway (7), Kevin Doyle (8), Brian Malouf (11)
- Mastered by Bob Ludwig at Masterdisk (New York, NY)
- Guitar technician – Mel Terpos
- Art direction and photography – Prudence Whittlesey
- Management – Champion Entertainment Organization, Inc.

== Charts ==
Chart (1990–1991)	Peak position
Australian (ARIA Charts)	137
Canada Top Albums/CDs (RPM)	39
Japanese Albums (Oricon)	13
Swedish Albums (Sverigetopplistan)	38
UK Albums (Official Charts)	44
US Billboard 200	60
