= Stormcellar =

Australian blues and roots band

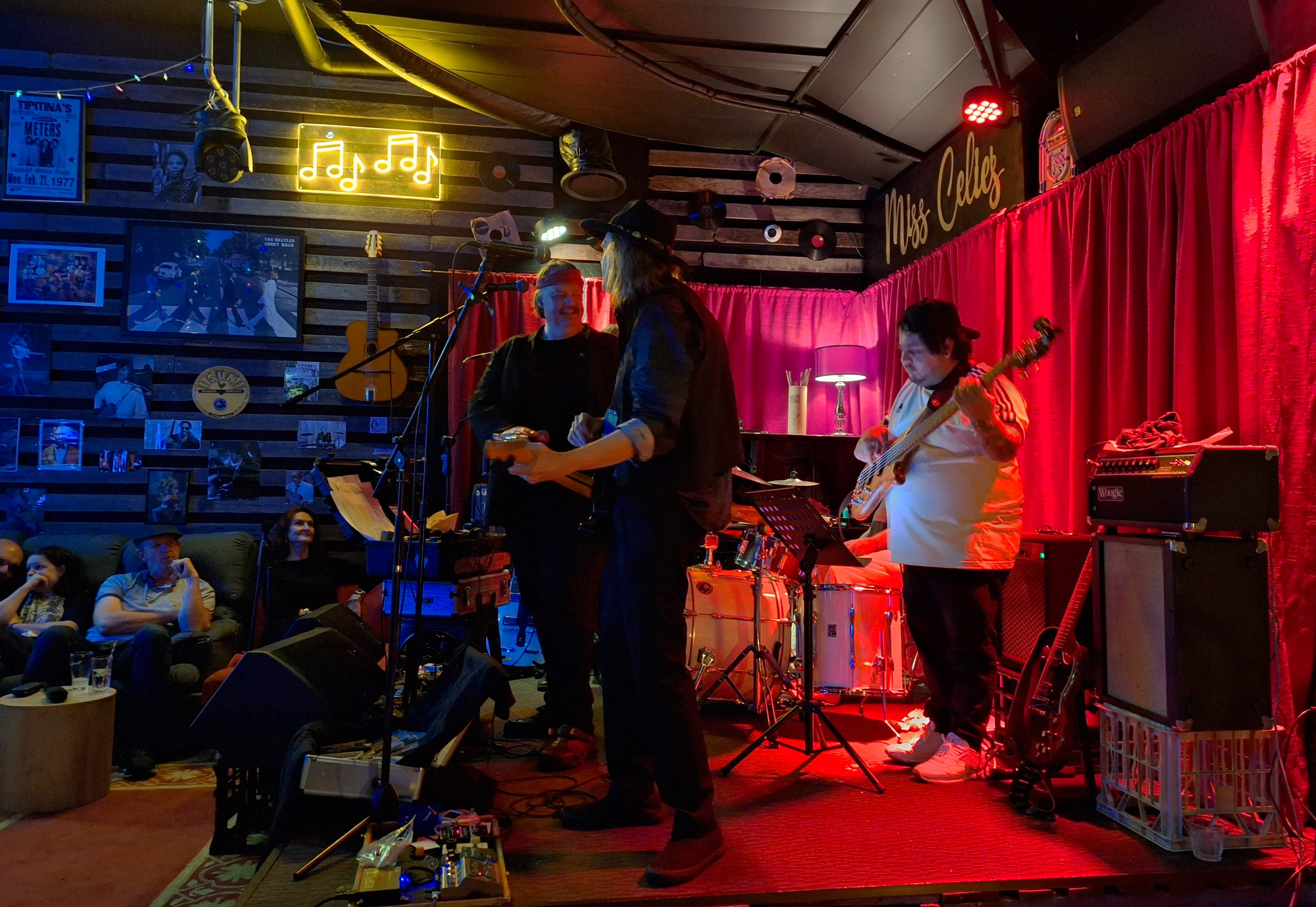
- Stormcellar in Sydney in 2025

Background information
- Origin: Sydney, Australia
- Genres: Blues, roots, rock, country, folk
- Years active: 2008–present
- Awards: Sydney Blues Band of the Year, Sydney Blues Challenge, 2019; Members' Choice Award, Sydney Blues Society, 2019, 2020
- Members: Michael Barry; Paul Read; Theo Wanders
- Past members: Michael Coggins; Mark Graeber; Jo Fitzgerald; Mihret 'Fox' Focic; Ben Halin; Mal Forrester; Noel Little; Michael Rosenthal; Paul Surany; Bill Williams
- Website: www.stormcellar.com.au

Stormcellar are an Australian blues, roots and rock band from Sydney, active since 2008. In 2019, the band won Sydney Blues Band of the Year at the Sydney Blues Challenge, and represented the Sydney Blues Society at the International Blues Challenge in Memphis, Tennessee in January 2020.

As at December 2025, Stormcellar have released 13 studio albums, two EPs, one double album, one live album and four compilation albums.

The band hosted six annual Country, Roots & Blues (CRAB) Festivals in Cooma, New South Wales, from 2018 to 2023. (Note: The 2024 CRAB Festival was planned but did not go ahead.)

== History ==
Stormcellar was formed in 2008 by Paul Read (guitar, slide guitar, mandolin) and Michael Barry (vocals, harmonica). Theo Wanders (drums) joined in 2009.

Read was previously a member of Sydney band Chosen Few and co-wrote their song 'Rise', which was recorded by Daryl Braithwaite in 1990 and reached number 23 on the Australian Singles Chart.

Since 2008, Stormcellar have released 13 studio albums, one double album, one live album, two EPs, and four compilations by genre (blues, rock, country and folk, and instrumental). In a 2015 interview with Steve Flack for Australian Guitar Magazine, Read explained the band's mix of genres from its earliest days, noting that they "wanted to cross each song with a different genre, and make sure that the feels were different, and we just weren’t playing shuffles or swings all night ... and to have slide guitar and harmonica play the melody lines." Barry told the Illawarra Mercury in 2009 that "We're doing modern blues and modern roots. We're telling new ideas, using forms that are classic."

Three of their albums have reached number 1 on the Australian Blues & Roots Airplay Charts: Nuevo Retro (2010), Hired Guns & Borrowed Glory (2012) and Defiance (2017).

Stormcellar play regularly in Sydney and regional New South Wales, and have toured multiple times in the US, including the 2014 All Colours Blues Tour during which they performed at the Crossroads Blues Festival in Rockford, Illinois.

In 2014–15, the band recorded and toured with Kansas City-based blues singer and guitarist D.C. Bellamy, Curtis Mayfield's half-brother. During their joint tour in Australia in 2015, Bellamy told the Sydney Blues Society's Ceinwen Brown that Stormcellar were "definitely my 'Blues Brothers'. We are having a great time together on the tour. The people here are just so receptive it's unbelievable."

On their 2020 US tour, Stormcellar organised a benefit concert for Australian bushfire relief with Kansas City musicians, including Bellamy and Danny Cox, at Knuckleheads Saloon, Kansas City.

Steve Jones of Blues Blast Magazine called the band's fifth album The Curious Assembly "cool, slick and fun", noting that Stormcellar's sound was "not completely blues, adding folk and country to the mix to make a unique and eclectic sound". His review of 2024's Basilisk also pointed out the mixing of genres in Stormcellar's style: "All the cuts are eclectically mixed and produced as one would expect from Stormcellar. Is it blues? Hard to tell. It’s a little bit of everything. It’s very much Stormcellar at their best."

Reviewing Kansas City Gold in 2017, Peter B. Lowry of Living Blues observed "a harder edge" to the band's blues style and noted that "the genre is not damaged one iota ... It’s successfully right in the pocket throughout."

== Members ==
In addition to Read, Barry and Wanders, other recording and touring members of the Stormcellar collective since the band's inception have included:

- Mark Graeber (drums)
- Mal Forrester (bass)
- Michael Rosenthal (guitar)
- Bill Williams (guitar)
- Jo Fitzgerald (vocals)
- Michael Coggins (guitar)
- Mihret 'Fox' Focic (bass)
- Paul Surany (guitar)
- Noel Little (bass)
- Ben Halin (bass).

In Australian Guitar Magazine, Read noted that by the time of Stormcellar's second album, Nuevo Retro (2009), he and Barry had found "regular players", however "the bass players came and went. We couldn’t find anyone crazy enough to actually join the band."

== Discography ==
=== Studio albums ===
- Whiskey Talkin’ (2008)
- Nuevo Retro (2009)
- Carl’s Chair (2010)
- Hired Guns & Borrowed Glory (2011)
- The Curious Assembly (2014)
- Everywhere Feels Like Home (2015)
- Kansas City Gold (2016)
- Defiance (2017)
- Safe Harbour (2018)
- Rogue State (2018)
- Signposts (2022)
- Basilisk (2024)
- Juggernaut (2025)

=== Double albums ===
- Safe Harbour / Rogue State (2018)

=== EPs ===
- Spacejunk (2009)
- Sweet Grace of Mercy (2021)

=== Live albums ===
- The Best of Downtime, Vol. 1 (2021)

=== Compilation albums ===
- Stormcellar Blues Collection, Vol. 1 (2021)
- Stormcellar Rock Collection, Vol. 1 (2021)
- Stormcellar Country & Folk Collection, Vol. 1 (2022)
- Stormcellar Instrumental Collection, Vol. 1 (2025)
