= The Chosen Few (1980s Australian band) =

Australian rock band

The Chosen Few were an Australian rock band active between 1985 and 1992. Signed to Mushroom Records and managed by Stuart Coupe, the Chosen Few released four singles and a lone album, Friends, Foes and Firewood (1990). Despite constant national touring (including opening for major touring acts like Jerry Harrison, Cheap Trick and Billy Joel on their respective Australian tours) and receiving support from the country's most influential radio stations, chart success eluded the Chosen Few. A cover version of the band's song "Rise", with some lyrical alterations, became a hit for popular Australian singer Daryl Braithwaite.

== Biography ==
The Chosen Few was formed in 1985 in Sydney by Abe Elshaikh (lead guitar, vocals) with Danny McCarthy (guitar, vocals), Paul Read (bass, backing vocals) and Rex Mansfield (drums, percussion, backing vocals). Elshaikh and McCarthy had previously played in a cover band called the Dead Bodgies before recruiting Read and Mansfield. Initially called the Rainmakers, they changed their name when they realised another band shared the name. As Elshaikh told The Sydney Morning Herald in 1989, "I had a song called 'The Chosen Few', and we thought, 'Why not?'".

After numerous months rehearsing, writing and cutting demos, the band was taken up by rock writer and manager Stuart Coupe, who at the time was enjoying commercial success as manager for Paul Kelly, and signed to Mushroom Records in 1988.

The band's debut single "Get It Right", written by McCarthy and Read, was released in November 1988 and was met with enthusiasm in the Australian rock music media. Music critic Jon Casimir called it "a guitar-based pop workout with a serious hookline", writing that it struck "a note of resilient optimism". The band's follow-up single, "Rise", written by Read and McCarthy, was released in April 1989 and was critically praised. "Love", written by Elshaikh, was released in November 1989. Two further singles, "Days Like These" and "When the Boat Comes In (Lifeboat)", both written by McCarthy, were released in 1990.

The band's debut album Friends, Foes and Firewood was released in 1990 and peaked at number 128 on the Australian album charts in July 1990.

In 1994, the band formerly known as The Chosen Few (without Elshaikh) re-emerged as The Dreamseed with addition of guitarist Steve Barnes and vocalist Darren Bulmer, and relocated to Germany.

Paul Read is currently a member of Stormcellar.

== Band members ==
- Danny McCarthy (guitar, vocals)
- Abe Elshaikh (lead guitar, vocals)
- Paul Read (bass, backing vocals)
- Rex Mansfield (drums, percussion, backing vocals)

== Discography ==
=== Studio albums ===
List of albums with Australian chart positions
Title	Details	Peak chart positions
Title	Details	AUS
Friends, Foes and Firewood	Released: July 1990; Label: Mushroom Records (D30248); Formats: CD, LP	128

=== Singles ===
Title	Year	Chart positions	Album
Title	Year	AUS	Album
"Get It Right"	1988	-	non album single
"Rise"	1989	120	Friends, Foes & Firewood
"Love"	1989	122	Friends, Foes & Firewood
"Days Like These"	1990	-	Friends, Foes & Firewood
"When the Boat Comes in (Lifeboat)"	1990	126	Friends, Foes & Firewood
