= Manor House Publishing =

Coordinates: 43.2063°N 79.9896°W

Manor House Publishing Incorporated
- Founded: 1998; 27 years ago
- Country of origin: Canada
- Headquarters location: Ancaster, Hamilton, Ontario
- Distribution: Fitzhenry & Whiteside
- Publication types: Books
- Fiction genres: Non-fiction, fiction, biography, business, New-age and poetry
- Official website: manor-house.biz

Manor House Publishing Incorporated is a small Canadian publishing company, established in 1998 and based in the Ancaster neighborhood of Hamilton Ontario.

== History and operations ==
It publishes mostly in soft-cover books by Canadian authors. These books vary in subjects, including non-fiction, fiction, biography, business, New Age and poetry. Authors whose works they produced include Ian Thomas and Pat MacAdam.

== See also ==
- Canadian literature
- Culture of Hamilton, Ontario
- List of English-language book publishing companies
- List of head offices in Hamilton, Ontario
