= Painted Ladies (song) =

1973 single by Ian Thomas

Song by Ian Thomas

from the album Ian Thomas
- B-side: "Will You Still Love Me"
- Released: October 1973
- Studio: RCA, Toronto
- Genre: Pop rock; Soft rock
- Length: 3:34
- Label: GRT; Janus
- Songwriter: Ian Thomas
- Producer: John Lombardo

"Painted Ladies" is a hit song recorded by Canadian singer-songwriter Ian Thomas. It was released in 1973 as a single from his first solo album, Ian Thomas. The song reached #4 on the Canadian charts and peaked at #34 on the U.S. Billboard Hot 100 the week of January 12, 1974.

Recorded at RCA Studios in Toronto, "Painted Ladies" was written about Thomas's stay at a nightclub in Ontario, Canada, which had a strip club on a different level and rooms above. The painted ladies referenced in the song are about the dancers in the club. The streetcars and airplanes reference the area of Toronto and Mississauga with the Toronto International Airport, another area famous for its strip clubs.

John Lombardo produced "Painted Ladies", and the distinctive Clavinet was played by musician, songwriter and producer John Capek.

== Charts ==
Weekly Charts
Charts (1973-1974)	Peak Position
Canada Top Singles (RPM)	4
US Billboard Hot 100	34
