= So Close (Hall & Oates song) =

Single by Hall & Oates

from the album Change of Season
- Released: September 17, 1990
- Recorded: 1990
- Genre: Pop rock, soul
- Length: 4:39 (album version); 4:11 (single version)
- Label: Arista
- Songwriters: Daryl Hall, George Green, Jon Bon Jovi, Danny Kortchmar
- Producers: Danny Kortchmar, Jon Bon Jovi

Hall & Oates singles chronology
"Love Train" (1989)	"So Close" (1990)	"Don't Hold Back Your Love" (1990)

Music video
- "So Close" on YouTube

"So Close" is a 1990 song by American pop duo Hall & Oates. It was written by Daryl Hall and George Green, and produced by Danny Kortchmar and Jon Bon Jovi. The song was released as the lead single from their fourteenth studio album, Change of Season (1990), and peaked at number 11 in the United States and number four in Canada. An acoustic version of the song also appears on the album and as a B-side of the single.

== Release and reception ==
"So Close" was released as a single in September 1990, and it debuted on the U.S. Billboard Hot 100 chart the same month. It peaked at number 11 in December and spent 19 weeks on the chart. "So Close" was Hall & Oates' 29th and most recent single to reach the Top 40 section of the chart, although they've had songs appear outside of the Top 40 since then. The song also reached number 11 on the Hot 100 Airplay chart, number 14 on the Singles Sales chart, and number six on the Adult Contemporary chart. The single peaked at number four in Canada and ranked number 36 on RPM magazine's year-end chart. It was less commercially successful in the United Kingdom, where it spent a sole week on the UK Singles Chart at number 69.

== Critical response ==
"So Close" received generally mixed reviews from music critics. In the January 1991 issue of Spin magazine, writer Ted Friedman described the single as "overproduced" and "butchered", but added, "To hear what a gorgeous song it really is, check out the acoustic version that ends the album." The Virgin Encyclopedia of 70s Music, edited by Colin Larkin, stated that producers Bon Jovi and Kortchmar "added a strong rock flavour to [Hall & Oates'] sound". Stephen Thomas Erlewine of AllMusic wrote that the song was the exception on an album that he felt was "largely undistinguished, relying more on sound than songcraft". A previously unreleased live version of "So Close", which appears on the 2009 box set Do What You Want, Be What You Are: The Music of Daryl Hall and John Oates, was called "impressive" by Ben Ratliff of The New York Times.

== Track listing ==
7" vinyl

No.	Title	Writer(s)	Length
1.	"So Close"	Daryl Hall & George Green; co-written by Jon Bon Jovi & Danny Kortchmar	4:11
2.	"So Close (Unplugged)"	Hall, Green, Jovi, Kortchmar	4:15

12" vinyl, CD

No.	Title	Writer(s)	Length
1.	"So Close"	Daryl Hall, George Green	4:11
2.	"She's Gone (Unplugged; live performance from BBC Radio 1's "Into The Night" on 3 May 1990)"	Daryl Hall, John Oates	4:25
3.	"Can't Help Falling in Love"	George Weiss, Hugo Peretti, Luigi Creatore	4:17
4.	"So Close (Unplugged)"	Daryl Hall, George Green	4:15

=== Notes ===
On 12" version of the single:

- Track 3: "Can't Help Falling in Love" as featured on NME compilation "The Last Temptation Of Elvis."

== Chart performance ==
=== Weekly charts ===
Chart (1990)	Peak position
Australia (ARIA)	106
Canada Top Singles (RPM)	4
UK Singles (OCC)	69
US Billboard Hot 100	11
US Adult Contemporary (Billboard)	6
US Cash Box Top 100	12
US Radio & Records CHR/Pop Airplay Chart	9

=== Year-end charts ===
Chart (1990)	Position
Canada Top Singles (RPM)	36

Chart (1991)	Position
US Adult Contemporary (Billboard)	44

== Personnel ==
- Daryl Hall – lead vocals, backing vocals
- John Oates – backing vocals
- Benmont Tench – keyboards
- Waddy Wachtel – guitars
- Danny Kortchmar – guitars
- Randy Jackson – bass
- Kenny Aronoff – drums, percussion
