= Let Me Be =

Single by Daryl Braithwaite

from the album Edge
- B-side: "It's All About the Music"
- Released: 28 April 1989
- Genre: Pop
- Length: 5:36
- Label: CBS
- Songwriters: Simon Hussey, David Reyne
- Producer: Simon Hussey

Daryl Braithwaite singles chronology
"'One Summer'" (1989)	"Let Me Be" (1989)	"'Sugar Train'" (1989)

"Let Me Be" is a song by Daryl Braithwaite, released as a single from his 1988 album Edge. It was released in April 1989 and peaked at number 26 in June 1989.

== Track listing ==
CD single

- Side 1 "Let Me Be" – 5:36
- Side 2 "It's All in the Music" – 3:40

== Charts ==
Chart performance for "Let Me Be"
Chart (1989)	Peak position
Australia (ARIA)	26
