= The Universal (Small Faces song) =

- Dutch picture sleeve

Single by Small Faces
- B-side: "Donkey Rides, A Penny, A Glass"
- Released: 28 June 1968
- Recorded: May – 5 June 1968
- Genre: Psychedelic folk
- Label: Immediate
- Songwriter: Marriott/Lane
- Producer: Marriott/Lane

Small Faces singles chronology
"Lazy Sunday" (1968)	"The Universal" (1968)	"Afterglow (Of Your Love)" (1969)

"The Universal" is a song by the English band Small Faces, released as a single on 28 June 1968. It reached number 16 in the UK, staying in the top 40 for a total of 10 weeks.

== Background ==
"The Universal" was originally titled by composer Steve Marriott as "Hello the Universal", but because of an error early in the single's production and manufacture the title was instead printed as the shorter "The Universal". Due to the costs involved in doing so, the error was never corrected.

A densely-lyrical song largely performed in an acoustic 'busking' style, the basic track of Marriott alone with an acoustic guitar was originally recorded by him 'on-the-fly' onto a portable tape machine, outdoors in the garden of his Essex home, Beehive Cottage. The lo-fi recording also picked up various ambient background noise such as birdsong, distant voices and car horns, and even the sound of the wind rumbling through the microphone. Marriott's dogs can also clearly be heard barking in the background (one of Marriott's dogs, Seamus, was also recorded howling in the studio for the Pink Floyd track of the same name, from their 1971 album Meddle). The Universal's lyrics involved complex wordplay, and the vocal was delivered by Marriott in an uncharacteristically offhand but still tuneful singing style. The basic track was enhanced later in the recording studio with various overdubbed instruments that slowly gain prominence as the song progresses, particularly a loud bass drum and percussion whose persistent thud and crash during the latter half of the song add to the recording's 'one-man-band' atmosphere.

Unusually for a Small Faces song of the period, keyboardist Ian McLagan was absent from the recording, having briefly fallen out with Marriott before the session.

Following the success of the Small Faces' previous chart-topping single "Lazy Sunday", a song Marriott himself was dismissive of, he was especially disappointed that The Universal only reached number 16 in the UK Singles Chart, Marriott was quoted at the time as saying that he thought "The Universal" was the best song he had ever written. He said of the song:

People keep saying that "Universal" is a send-up of Dylan or the one-man band – they don't seem to realize that it's a serious record. This proves that they don't really listen to it because if they did they'd understand what it's all about. It's about getting up in the morning and going outside and saying hello to the Universe

"The Universal" was the final authorized single released by Small Faces before they disbanded in 1969. Almost a year later, their record label Immediate would release a version of "Afterglow of Your Love" as the unauthorised final single by the group.

It has been suggested that Britpop band Blur's song of the same name was so titled in homage to this track. The band were said to also have been influenced by the Small Faces' "Lazy Sunday" with their song, "Parklife", further adding to the speculation.

== Personnel ==
Small Faces

- Steve Marriott – acoustic and electric guitars, lead vocals
- Ronnie Lane – bass guitar
- Kenney Jones – drums, spoons, percussion

Other musicians

- Don Fay – clarinet
- Derek Wadsworth – trombone

== Charts ==
Weekly chart performance for "The Universal"
Chart (1968)	Peak position
Austria (Disc Parade)	15
Netherlands (Dutch Top 40)	14
Netherlands (Single Top 100)	12
New Zealand (Listener)	18
UK (Melody Maker)	16
UK (New Musical Express)	16
UK (Record Retailer)	16
West Germany (Media Control)	35

== See also ==
- Small Faces discography
