= Love Songs (Daryl Braithwaite song) =

Single by Daryl Braithwaite
- Released: 5 June 2020
- Genre: Pop rock
- Length: 3:13
- Label: Mangco; Sony Music Australia
- Songwriters: Michael Fatkin; Rozzi Crane; Charlie Snyder
- Producer: Michael Fatkin

Daryl Braithwaite singles chronology
"Not Too Late" (2013)	"Love Songs" (2020)

Music video
- "Love Songs" on YouTube

Daryl Braithwaite performing 'Love Songs' in 2020.

"Love Songs" is a song by Australian singer-songwriter Daryl Braithwaite. It was released on 5 June 2020. The song was certified gold in Australia in October 2020.

At the APRA Music Awards of 2021, the song was shortlisted for Song of the Year.

== Background and release ==
Braithwaite was sent "Love Songs" by songwriter and old friend Michael Fatkin, who had worked on the track with Los Angeles–based writers Rozzi Crane and Charlie Snyder. Fatkin had wanted Braithwaite to forward the song to Roger Davies, the manager of Pink. Braithwaite said: "I sent it to Roger on my phone and didn't hear back. Weeks turned into a couple of months and eventually we ended up having lunch together – I asked what he thought of the song and he said he'd never received it." After hearing it, Davies told Braithwaite that it suited him better than P!nk. Braithwaite confesses "I was relieved, so, we went ahead and recorded it."

The week following its release, Braithwaite said: "I'm so thrilled to have new music out there and that people like it. I wouldn't have ever dreamed I would have such a long career in music."

== Chart performance ==
"Love Songs" debuted on the ARIA Top 100 Singles Chart at number 80 for the chart dated 20 July 2020. The following week, the song rose 37 positions, peaking at number 43. This became Braithwaite's first top 50 chart appearance in 27 years; his first since "The World as It Is" in November 1993.

== Charts ==
=== Weekly charts ===
Chart (2020)	Peak position
Australia (ARIA)	43

=== Year-end charts ===
Chart (2020)	Position
Australian Artist (ARIA)	44

== Certification ==
Region	Certification	Certified units/sales
Australia (ARIA)	Gold	35,000^{‡}
^{‡} Sales+streaming figures based on certification alone.

== Release history ==
Release formats for "Love Songs"
Region	Date	Format	Label	Catalogue	Ref.
Australia	5 June 2020	Digital download; streaming; contemporary hit radio	Sony Music Australia	G010004281056J	
Australia	17 July 2020	CD single	Sony Music Australia	19439793112	
