= List of head offices in Hamilton, Ontario =

Companies with head offices located in Hamilton, Ontario and Area include:

- Hamilton Health Sciences
- Stelco Inc.
- Arcelor Mittal Dofasco Inc.
- Femtotech Engineering
- National Steel Car
- Hamilton Port Authority
- Orlick Industries Limited
- Robbinex Inc.
- Siemens Canada Ltd.
- Coppley Apparel Group
- Fluke Transportation Group
- Fox 40 International Inc.
- Taylor Steel
- AIC Limited
- Hamilton Specialty Bar Corp.
- John Deere Ltd.
- Horizon Utilities Corporation
- Fortinos Supermarket Limited
- Arcor Windows & Doors
- Nelson Steel
- Oakrun Farm Bakery Ltd.
- E.D. Smith & Sons Ltd.
- Baffin Technology
- Tiercon Industries Inc.
- Stelwire Ltd.
- Turkstra Windows (Industries)
- Regional Die Casting Ltd.
- Stryker Canada
- Lewisfoods Inc.
- Samuel Plate Sales
- Universal Handling Equipment Co. Ltd.
- McKeil Marine Ltd.
- Sobotec Ltd.
- Robertson Building Systems
- Intermetco Ltd.
- Dell Pharmacy
- First Ontario Credit Union
- BDO Dunwoody
- Pioneer Petroleum
- CARSTAR Automotive Canada Inc
- NetAccess Systems Inc
- Clearcable Networks
- Metro Loop
