= Daryl Braithwaite... Best Of =

Daryl Braithwaite… Best Of

Compilation album by Daryl Braithwaite
- Released: 1978
- Recorded: 1974–1978
- Genre: Pop rock, Soft rock
- Label: Razzle Records
- Producer: Daryl Braithwaite, Bruce Brown, Russell Dunlop, Tweed Harris, Richard Lush, Tony Mitchell, Warren Morgan, Garth Porter

Daryl Braithwaite chronology
Daryl Braithwaite… Best Of (1978)	Out on the Fringe (1979)

Daryl Braithwaite... Best Of is a compilation album – and also the debut solo album – by Australian singer-songwriter, and Sherbet lead-singer, Daryl Braithwaite. It comprised solo singles released to date, including the Australian number-one hit "You're My World". Both A-sides and B-sides of all seven of his solo singles from 1974 through to 1978 are included. It peaked at No. 32 on the Kent Music Report Albums Chart.

== Track listing ==
Side one
No.	Title	Writer(s)	Producer(s)	Length
1.	"Why Do I Break It Up"	Dunlop, Punch, Wilson	Bruce Brown, Russell Dunlop	3:16
2.	"Cavalry"	Daryl Braithwaite, Tony Mitchell	Warren Morgan, Tony Mitchell, Brown, Daryl Braithwaite	3:32
3.	"Fly Away"	Warren Morgan, Braithwaite	Richard Lush, Morgan, Mitchell, Braithwaite	3:18
4.	"I'm Feeling Lonely"	Garth Porter, Braithwaite	Garth Porter	3:17
5.	"Let's Go Dancin'"	Tony Mitchell	Mitchell, Braithwaite	2:57
6.	"See"	Felix Cavaliere	Brown, Dunlop	4:00
7.	"Afterglow (Of Your Love)"	Steve Marriott, Ronnie Lane	Mitchell, Braithwaite	3:28

Side two
No.	Title	Writer(s)	Producer(s)	Length
8.	"You're My World"	Umberto Bindi, Gino Paoli, Carl Sigman	Tweed Harris	3:05
9.	"Time"	Braithwaite	Brown, Braithwaite	2:45
10.	"Old Sid"	Morgan	Brown, Braithwaite	3:21
11.	"If You Walked Away"	David Pomeranz	Porter	3:44
12.	"Princess"	Braithwaite	Harris	3:30
13.	"Love Has No Pride"	Eric Kaz, Libby Titus	Lush, Morgan, Mitchell, Braithwaite	3:15
14.	"A Simple Song"	Braithwaite, Mitchell, Morgan, Gibley	Morgan, Mitchell, Brown, Braithwaite	3:02
