= Barren Ground (song) =

1990 song written by Bruce and John Hornsby

"Barren Ground" is a song written by Bruce Hornsby and John Hornsby for the 1990 album A Night on the Town by Bruce Hornsby and the Range.

== Daryl Braithwaite version ==
"Barren Ground"

Single by Daryl Braithwaite

from the album Taste the Salt
- B-side: "The Other Side"
- Released: 10 January 1994
- Length: 4:42
- Label: Columbia
- Songwriter(s): Bruce Hornsby; John Hornsby
- Producer(s): Simon Hussey

Daryl Braithwaite singles chronology
"The World as It Is" (1993)	"Barren Ground" (1994)	"Breaking the Rules" (1994)

"Barren Ground" was covered by Australian singer-songwriter Daryl Braithwaite and released as the second single from his fourth studio album, Taste the Salt in January 1994. Producer Simon Hussey won the ARIA award for Engineer of the Year for his work on this track and Braithwaite's "The World as It Is" at the ARIA Music Awards of 1994.

=== Track listing ===
CD single

1. "Barren Ground" – 4:42
2. "The Other Side" – 4:10
3. "The Horses" (acoustic) – 4:17

=== Charts ===
Weekly chart performance for "Barren Ground"
Chart (1994)	Peak position
Australia (ARIA)	61
