= As the Days Go By =

Single by Daryl Braithwaite

from the album Edge
- B-side: "In My Life"
- Released: August 19, 1988
- Studio: Platinum Studios, Melbourne
- Genre: Rock, pop
- Length: 4:04; 5:07 (extended mix)
- Label: CBS
- Songwriter(s): Ian Thomas
- Producer(s): Simon Hussey

Daryl Braithwaite singles chronology
"Prove Your Love" (1980)	"As the Days Go By" (1988)	"All I Do" (1988)

"As the Days Go By" is a song written by Ian Thomas and recorded by Australian singer Daryl Braithwaite as the first single from his second studio album, Edge, in 1988. It features singer John Farnham as a backing vocalist in the chorus. The song was also released in the UK.

The track is one of Braithwaite's most popular recordings, and was included on his compilation albums The Essential Daryl Braithwaite (2007) and Days Go By (2017). An extended mix features in the 1994 compilation album Six Moons: The Best of Daryl Braithwaite 1988–1994 and an acoustic version opens the 2008 live album The Lemon Tree. The song was also included on the soundtrack to the 1992 British comedy film Peter's Friends.

== Track listing ==
CD single (1988)

1. "As The Days Go By" – 4:04
2. "In My Life" – 5:07

== Personnel ==
- Daryl Braithwaite – vocals
- Andy Cichon – bass
- Jef Scott – guitars, keyboards, backing vocals, additional drumming
- Simon Hussey – keyboards, drum machine, producer
- John Farnham – backing vocals

== Charts ==
=== Weekly charts ===
Chart (1988)	Peak position
Australia (ARIA)	11
New Zealand (Recorded Music NZ)	49

=== Year-end charts ===
(1988)	Position
Australia (ARIA Charts)	70
