= Taste the Salt =

Studio album by Daryl Braithwaite
- Released: 5 November 1993
- Recorded: July–August 1993, Platinum Australia, Melbourne, Australia
- Genre: Pop rock, Soft rock
- Label: Columbia
- Producer: Simon Hussey

Daryl Braithwaite chronology
Higher Than Hope (1991)	Taste the Salt (1993)	Six Moons: The Best of 1988-1994 (1994)

Taste the Salt is an album by Daryl Braithwaite released in November 1993. The album reached No. 13 on the Australian ARIA Charts.

Braithwaite undertook the Taste the Salt Tour, nationally from 1 March to 18 April 1994.

== Track listing ==
1. "In the Distance" (Daryl Braithwaite, Ricky Edwards, Simon Hussey)
2. "Barren Ground" (Bruce Hornsby, John Hornsby)
3. "Breakin' the Rules" (Robbie Robertson)
4. "The World as It Is" (Tina Harris, Daniel O'Brien)
5. "Wind and Sea" (Ricky Edwards, Daryl Braithwaite)
6. "Reflection of Me" (P. Bowman, A. McSweeney)
7. "Look What Your Love Has Done to Me" (John Capek, Marc Jordan)
8. "Gonna Be Somebody" (John Waite, Jonathan Cain, Anthony Brock)
9. "Trust Somebody" (Marc Jordan, Richard Page, Patrick Leonard)
10. "Hundreds of Tears" (Sheryl Crow, Robert Marlette)
11. "Shout" (Lawrence Maddy, Daryl Braithwaite)

== Personnel ==
- Daryl Braithwaite – vocals
- Stuart Fraser – guitar, bass
- Scott Griffiths – piano, keyboards, string arrangement
- Simon Hussey – keyboards, drum machine, additional drums, producer
- John Watson – drums, percussion
- John Corniola – additional drums

== Charts ==
Chart (1993–94)	Peak position
Australian Albums (ARIA)	13

== Singles ==
Release date	Single	Peak chart positions
Release date	Single	Australia
11 October 1993	"The World as It Is"	35
4 January 1994	"Barren Ground"	61
22 March 1994	"Breaking the Rules"	—

== Release history ==
Country	Date	Label	Format	Catalog
Australia	8 November 1993	Columbia/Sony Music Australia	CD	474864.2
