= Ian Thomas (Canadian musician) =

Canadian singer, songwriter, actor and author (born 1950)

- Born: Ian Campbell Thomas; 23 July 1950 (age 76); Hamilton, Ontario, Canada
- Genre: Rock
- Occupations: Singer, songwriter, actor, author
- Instruments: Vocals, Guitar, Keyboards
- Years active: 1970–present
- Labels: Anthem, GRT, Chrysalis, Atlantic, Alma Records
- Website: http://www.ianthomas.ca

Ian Campbell Thomas (born 23 July 1950) is a Juno Award-winning Canadian singer-songwriter, actor and author. Best known for his 1973 hit "Painted Ladies" and his role on The Red Green Show as Dougie Franklin, he is the younger brother of comedian and actor Dave Thomas.

== Early life ==
Thomas was born in Hamilton, Ontario, to Moreen Duff Muir (1928–2022), a church organist for thirty years originally from Glasgow, Scotland, and composer of church music, and John E. Thomas (1926–1996), a medical ethicist from Merthyr Tydfil, Wales, who was head of the Philosophy Department at McMaster University, and the author of several books.

The family moved temporarily to Durham, North Carolina, where Thomas's father attended Duke University and earned a PhD in philosophy. The family moved back to Dundas, Ontario, in 1961.

== Career ==
Thomas began his music career with the folk group Tranquillity Base before joining the CBC as a producer. He launched a solo career that peaked in the 1970s, most notably with the 1973 hit "Painted Ladies". While he achieved acclaim in Canada, maintaining a long-term presence in the U.S. remained a challenge; "Painted Ladies" remains his only U.S. Top 40 hit. Thomas has also composed scores for around a dozen films and television shows.

In 1974, Thomas won the Juno Award for "Most Promising Male Vocalist of the Year" and toured Eastern Canada with April Wine. He later signed with Chrysalis Records in 1976.

In 1981, Thomas made a cameo appearance on SCTV alongside his older brother, Dave Thomas, during a "The Great White North" sketch. Appearing as himself, he performed the songs "Pilot" and "Hold On". He also wrote and recorded the theme song for his brother's 1983 comedy film, Strange Brew. Additionally, Thomas appeared as a musical guest on the 1979 CTV children's show Whatever Turns You On, a short-lived spinoff of You Can't Do That on Television.

Many of his songs have been covered by popular artists, including "Hold On" (Santana, 1982), "Chains" (Chicago, 1982), "The Runner" (Manfred Mann's Earth Band, 1984), and "Right Before Your Eyes" (America, 1983). In 1988, Daryl Braithwaite had hits in Australia with two Thomas compositions: "As the Days Go By" (which peaked at No. 10), and "All I Do" (a No. 12 chart hit). Bette Midler also covered his song "To Comfort You" on her Bette of Roses album.

He is also known for the portrayal of the character "Dougie Franklin" on the Canadian comedy series The Red Green Show.

Thomas was music producer on films including Care Bears: Journey to Joke-A-Lot (2004) and The Care Bears' Big Wish Movie (2005).

In 2009, Thomas provided the music for the animated series Bob & Doug, based on the SCTV characters of the same name.

He has written two books, Bequest (2006), A Canadian bestseller, and The Lost Chord (2008), both through Manor House Publishing.

In 2010, Wounded Bird Records re-issued "Still Here" on CD.

On 16 June 2014, Thomas was awarded the National Achievement Award by SOCAN at the 2014 SOCAN Awards in Toronto.

In 2015, he performed with Darcy Hepner and the Hamilton Philharmonic Orchestra, and recorded with them for a CD.

During the summer of 2016, Thomas was touring Ontario, Canada, with singers Murray McLauchlan, Cindy Church, and Marc Jordan, in the group Lunch At Allen's. The tour was continuing in late 2018 with a series of dates in Ontario.

Thomas is a member of the Canadian charity Artists Against Racism.

== Personal life ==
His son Jake Thomas, a director of adventure sports documentaries, was injured in a snowmobiling accident in 2017.

== Discography ==
=== Singles ===
==== With Tranquillity Base (1970–71) ====
Year	Title	Chart positions			Album
Year	Title	Canada RPM 100	Canada A/C	US Hot 100	Album
1970	"If You're Lookin'"	24	47	-	Non-LP singles
1970	"In the Rain"	-	-	-	Non-LP singles

==== Ian Thomas solo career (1973–2016) ====
Year	Title	Chart positions			Album
Year	Title	Canada RPM 100	Canada A/C	US Hot 100	Album
1973	"Painted Ladies"	4	5	34	Ian Thomas
1973	"Come the Sun"	41	84	-	Ian Thomas
1974	"Long Long Way"	85	39	-	Long Long Way
1975	"Mother Earth"	41	-	-	Re-recorded single version: Original version from Long Long Way
1975	"Julie"	69	-	-	Delights
1975	"The Good Life"	91	-	-	Delights
1976	"Liars"	25	-	-	Calabash
1976	"Mary Jane"	-	-	-	Calabash
1977	"Right Before Your Eyes"	57	-	-	Calabash
1978	"Coming Home"	40	33	-	Still Here
1978	"Sally"	-	-	-	Still Here
1978	"I Really Love You"	-	-	-	Still Here
1979	"Time is the Keeper"	71	-	-	Glider
1979	"Pilot"	83	-	-	Glider
1980	"Tear Down the Wall"	-	-	-	The Best of Ian Thomas
1981	"The Runner"	-	-	-	The Runner
1981	"Hold On"	28	20	-	The Runner
1981	"Borrowed Time"	-	-	-	The Runner
1981	"Chains"	29	-	-	The Runner
1983	"Strange Brew"	-	-	-	Strange Brew soundtrack
1984	"Do You Right"	65	-	-	Riders on Dark Horses
1984	"Picking Up the Pieces"	-	-	-	Riders on Dark Horses
1985	"Endless Emotion"	-	-	-	Add Water
1985	"Harmony"	-	-	-	Add Water
1985	"Touch Me"	-	-	-	Add Water
1988	"Levity"	25	-	-	Levity
1989	"Back to Square One"	33	-	-	Levity

==== With The Boomers (1991–2002) ====
Year	Title	Chart positions			Album
Year	Title	Canada RPM 100	Canada A/C	US Hot 100	Album
1991	"Love You Too Much"	41	32	-	What We Do
1991	"One Little Word"	49	29	-	What We Do
1991	"Wishes"	68	28	-	What We Do
1993	"You've Got to Know"	20	26	-	Art of Living
1993	"Art of Living"	41	-	-	Art of Living
1994	"Good Again"	68	-	-	Art of Living
1996	"I Feel a Change Coming"	17	15	-	25 Thousand Days
1997	"Saving Face"	18	24	-	25 Thousand Days
2002	"I Want to Believe in Something"	-	-	-	Midway

==== With Lunch at Allen's (2004–present) ====
Year	Title	Chart positions			Album
Year	Title	Canada RPM 100	Canada A/C	US Hot 100	Album
2004	"Perfect World"	-	-	-	Lunch at Allen's
2007	"What Kind of Love"	-	-	-	Catch the Moon

=== Solo albums ===
- 1973 - Ian Thomas; #30 CAN (10 weeks in Top 100)
- 1974 - Long Long Way
- 1975 - Delights
- 1976 - Calabash (aka Goodnight Mrs. Calabash) (as Ian Thomas Band); #62 CAN (20 weeks in Top 100)
- 1978 - Still Here (as Ian Thomas Band); #60 CAN (10 weeks in Top 100)
- 1979 - Glider (as Ian Thomas Band); #77 CAN (8 weeks in Top 100)
- 1980 - The Best of Ian Thomas
- 1981 - The Runner
- 1984 - Riders on Dark Horses; #91 CAN (6 weeks in Top 100)
- 1985 - Add Water
- 1988 - Levity; #74 CAN (6 weeks in Top 100)
- 1993 - Looking Back
- 2012 - Little Dreams
- 2016 - A Life in Song
- 2024 - How We Roll

=== Albums with The Boomers ===
- 1991 - What We Do
- 1993 - Art of Living
- 1996 - 25 Thousand Days
- 2002 - Midway

=== Albums with Lunch at Allen's ===
- 2004 - Lunch at Allen's
- 2007 - Catch the Moon
- 2010 - More Lunch at Allen's
- 2012 - Zuzu's Petals
- 2017 - If It Feels Right

=== Comedy Album with the Air Pirates ===
- 1990 - Volume Two
