= Clay drum =

Musical percussion drum instrument

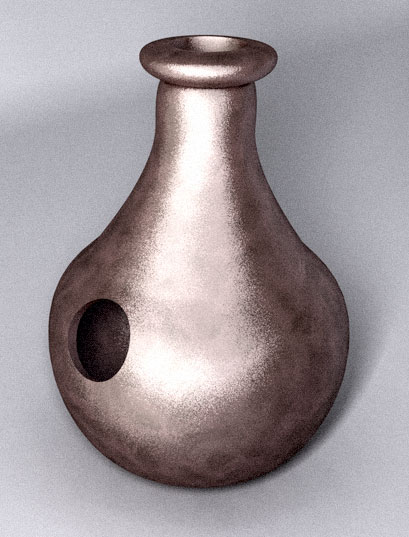
An udu

A clay drum is a variety of percussion instrument found in various parts of the world. It may refer to:

== Idiophones ==
- Ghatam, from India
- Udu, from Nigeria

== Membranophones ==
- Alligator drum once used in Neolithic China, made from clay and alligator hides
- Goblet drum, from the Middle East
- Khol, from India
- Kus, from Iran
- Madal, from Nepal
- Mrdanga, from India
- Naqareh, from the Middle East, Central Asia, and India
- Tassa, used by Indo-Caribbeans
- Tumdak', from India
