= Out on the Fringe =

1979 album by Daryl Braithwaite

Studio album by Daryl Braithwaite
- Released: October 5, 1979
- Recorded: 1979
- Genre: Pop rock, Soft rock
- Label: Infinity
- Producer: Terry Shaddick; Steve Kipner (tracks 3 & 4)

Daryl Braithwaite chronology
Daryl Braithwaite... Best Of (1978)	Out on the Fringe (1979)	Edge (1988)

Out On The Fringe is the debut solo studio album by Australian singer Daryl Braithwaite released in 1979. "Prove Your Love" and "Like a Child" were released as singles from the album.

== Track listing ==
Side one
No.	Title	Writer(s)	Producer(s)	Length
1.	"Out On The Fringe"	Gregg Sutton, Vince Malamed	Terry Shaddick	1:05
2.	"I Thought It Was You"	Terry Shaddick, Bruce Donnelly	Shaddick	3:41
3.	"Hit Onto Something Good"	Steve Kipner, Ronald Leigh, C. Christian	Steve Kipner	3:26
4.	"Love Like A Child"	Steve Halter	Kipner	3:57
5.	"Bandits"	Shaddick, Tony Craig	Shaddick	3:34
6.	"See"	Sutton	Shaddick	3:37

Side two
No.	Title	Writer(s)	Producer(s)	Length
7.	"They Don't See What I Do"	Shaddick, Donnelly	Shaddick	2:14
8.	"Prove Your Love"	Shaddick, Donnelly	Shaddick	2:51
9.	"Lips That Taste Of Wine"	Shaddick, Donnelly	Shaddick	4:33
10.	"That's Right"	Shaddick, Donnelly	Shaddick	2:41
11.	"Out On The Fringe (Reprise)"	Sutton, Malamed	Shaddick	4:22

== Personnel ==
- Daryl Braithwaite - vocals
- Joey Harris - guitars
- Terry Shaddick - guitars and backing vocals
- Bruce Donnelly, Steve Halter - keyboards
- Mark Browne - bass guitar
- Mark Shulman - sitar
- Mike Botts, Guy Shiffman, John Dick, Art Wood - drums
- Johnny Conga - percussion
- Steve Kipner, Peter Beckett - backing vocals

== Release history ==
Country	Date	Label	Format	Catalog
Australia	1979	Infinity	LP/CD	CD- D19286
