= All I Do =

Single by Daryl Braithwaite

from the album Edge
- B-side: "The Promise Land"
- Released: October 28, 1988
- Genre: Pop
- Length: 4:06
- Label: CBS
- Songwriter: Ian Thomas
- Producer: Simon Hussey

Daryl Braithwaite singles chronology
"As the Days Go By" (1988)	"All I Do" (1988)	"One Summer" (1989)

"All I Do" is a song written and performed by Ian Thomas. It was later recorded by Daryl Braithwaite as the second single from his second studio album, Edge.

Reviewing the single, Music & Media called "All I Do" a "strong number", but believed that the chorus was "stolen" from "All I Want Is You" by Roxy Music.

== Track listing ==
CD single

1. "All I Do"
2. "The Promise Land"

CD Maxi single

1. "All I Do"
2. "Up-Out" (Andy Cichin, Daryl Braithwaite, Jef Scott, John Watson, Scott Griffiths, Simon Hussey)
3. "The Promise Land" (Scott)

== Charts ==
Chart performance for "All I Do"
Chart (1988)	Peak position
Australia (ARIA)	23
