= Snapshot (Daryl Braithwaite album) =

Studio album by Daryl Braithwaite
- Released: April 22, 2005
- Recorded: 2004
- Studio: Hobby Horse Studio
- Genre: Pop rock, Soft rock
- Label: Daryl Braithwaite
- Producer: Scott Kingman

Daryl Braithwaite chronology
| Afterglow: The Essential Collection 1971–1994 (2002) | Snapshot (2005) | The Essential Daryl Braithwaite (2007) |

Snapshot is an album by Daryl Braithwaite released in 2005. It was his first studio album since Taste the Salt in 1993.

== Track listing ==
1. "Where the Poor Boys Dance" (D. Tyson, W. Lawrie, C. Kennedy)
2. "This Love" (Scott Kingman, Daryl Braithwaite)
3. "On Love's Ocean" (Andrew Gibbs)
4. "See You Around Sometime" (Mark Seymour, Daryl Braithwaite)
5. "Duende" (Daryl Braithwaite, Andrew Gibbs)
6. "Start All Over Again" (J. Harris)
7. "S.M.T.A.M." (Andrew Gibbs)
8. "Walkin' Away" (Daryl Braithwaite, Andrew Gibbs)
9. "Lullaby" (Andrew Gibbs)
10. "Nobody's Side" (Benny Andersson, Björn Ulvaeus, Tim Rice)

== Personnel ==
- David Campbell – acoustic guitars
- John Corniola – drums
- Geoffrey Wells – electric guitar
- Michael Caruana – keyboard bass
- Rex Fernandez – bass guitar
- Andrew Gibbs – acoustic guitar
- Scott Griffiths – keyboards
- Brett Kingman – electric guitar
- Scott Kingman – guitars, bass, percussion, programming, keyboards
- Cam McKenzie – bass guitar
- Adam Quaife – additional piano
- Kim Webster – string arrangement and recording
- Adoration on the Gospel Train - vocal group (Janine Maunder, Michelle Serret, Troy McMillin, Annette Roche)
