= Gerald O'Brien (composer) =

Canadian-born composer

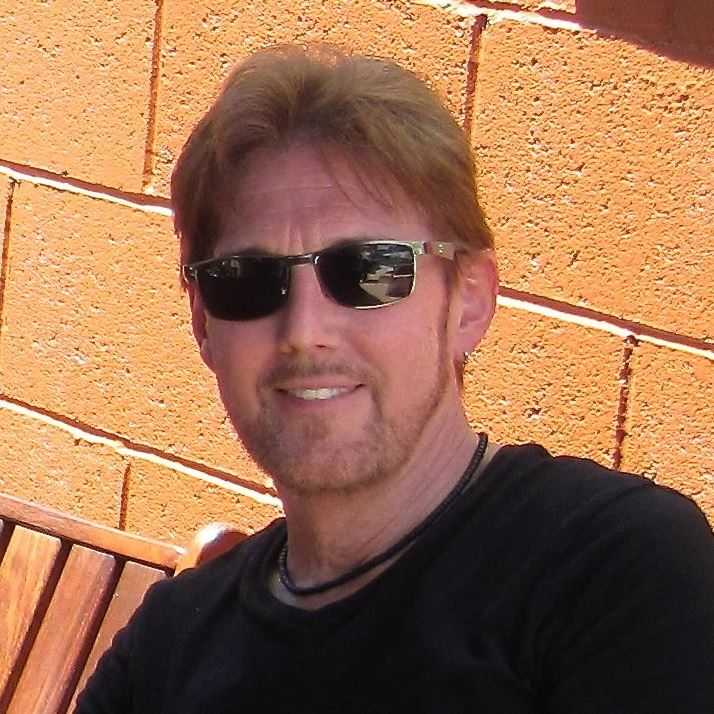

Gerald O'Brien is a Canadian-born songwriter and composer.

== Music ==
In 1988, O’Brien and friend/keyboardist Steve Sexton teamed up to form the instrumental duo "Exchange", as they share an interest in instrumental music and TV and film scoring. Their first album Into The Night was released in 1989 on Passport Records in New York and remains one of their most successful albums.

Their second album, Between Places, appeared on Billboard's Top 10 World Music Charts. They released four more albums in the 1990s. Their song "Til the Last Teardrop Falls" featuring Marc Jordan and Amy Sky was also cut and released by David Hasselhoff and seen on the TV series Baywatch. Another song, "Her Body Makes Vows", was featured in the film Never Talk to Strangers, and was later recorded by Rick Springfield.

== Awards and nominations ==
- JUNO Awards - Best Instrumental Artist - nominee
- SOCAN's Classic Song Award
