= The World as It Is (song) =

1993 single by Daryl Braithwaite

Single by Daryl Braithwaite

from the album Taste the Salt
- B-side: "In the Distance (Getting Closer)"
- Released: 11 October 1993
- Length: 3:53
- Label: Columbia
- Songwriter(s): Tina Harris, Daniel O'Brien
- Producer(s): Simon Hussey

Daryl Braithwaite singles chronology
"Nothing to Lose" (1992)	"The World as It Is" (1993)	"Barren Ground" (1994)

"The World as It Is" is a song by Australian singer-song writer Daryl Braithwaite, released in October 1993 as the lead single from his fourth studio album, Taste the Salt. Producer Simon Hussey won an ARIA award for Engineer of the Year for his work on this track and Braithwaite's "Barren Ground" at the ARIA Music Awards of 1994.

== Track listing ==
CD single

1. "The World as It Is" – 3:52
2. "In the Distance (Getting Closer)" – 5:21

== Charts ==
Chart (1993)	Peak position
Australia (ARIA)	35
