= Afterglow of Your Love =

- Dutch picture sleeve

Single by Small Faces

from the album Ogdens' Nut Gone Flake
- B-side: "Wham Bam Thank You Mam"
- Released: 7 March 1969
- Recorded: March 1968
- Studio: Olympic, London
- Genre: Hard rock; psychedelic rock
- Length: 3:24
- Label: Immediate
- Songwriters: Marriott, Lane
- Producer: Marriott/Lane

Small Faces singles chronology
"The Universal" (1968)	"Afterglow of Your Love" (1969)	"Mad John" (1969)

"Afterglow of Your Love" is a song by the English rock group Small Faces. The song was originally simply titled "Afterglow" on the album on which it first appeared in May 1968, Ogdens' Nut Gone Flake. Without authorisation from the band, the song was released as a single in 1969 and reached no. 36 on the UK Singles Chart.

In March 1969 the Small Faces officially disbanded, with Steve Marriott going on to form Humble Pie with Peter Frampton and Greg Ridley. Andrew Loog Oldham, Small Faces' manager and proprietor of their record label, then rush-released "Afterglow"—a song which by this point was over a year old—as a final 'farewell' single without the group's permission. Radically remixed and now called "Afterglow of Your Love", this soulful power ballad was released in a noticeably different, slightly sped-up mix from the version that originally appeared on Ogdens, removing the LP version's acoustic introduction and fading out the recording at a much later point, which in effect added a long instrumental coda.

The song was coupled with a contrasting hard rock number on the B-side, which was mis-titled on both cover and label as "Wham Bam Thank You Man" (the song's actual title is "Wham Bam Thank You Mam"—or, even more correctly—"Ma'am"). To this day, some of the less well-researched Small Faces reissues still carry this incorrect title for the song. One of the final few tracks the Small Faces completed in September 1968, the hard-rocking sound of "Wham Bam Thank You Ma'am" strongly indicated the musical direction Marriott would soon continue to pursue with Humble Pie. Several different mixes of this version of the song exist. Some "Best of" compilations contain a slower, but clearer mix of the song that highlights certain instruments to create a different, slightly bluesier feel. Some initial foreign pressings of the single also mistakenly substituted another, even more markedly different version of the song, which is a completely different, much earlier take from June 1968 that features Nicky Hopkins in place of regular keyboardist Ian McLagan. This embryonic version of the song is at a lighter, faster tempo and has completely different lyrics, and it has also been regularly included in various compilations under the title "Me, You And Us Too".

Both songs are credited to Steve Marriott and Ronnie Lane in a publishing arrangement similar to that between John Lennon and Paul McCartney of The Beatles. Marriott later expressed great frustration at this situation and reclaimed sole credit for composing 'Afterglow' and a number of other Small Faces hits such as Tin Soldier (indeed, this frustration was later claimed to be one of the factors that affected Marriott's decision to eventually leave the group). 'Wham Bam Thank You Ma'am' is likely another of Marriott's solo compositions, given that Lane reportedly expressed dissatisfaction with the 'heavy' mood of the song (for his own part, it was later revealed that Lane had written the bulk of their 1967 hit Itchycoo Park and a number of other Small Faces songs by himself). Marriott was at the time an avid listener to Dr. John the Night Tripper's new 'Gris Gris' LP, and the lyric of 'Wham Bam' openly referenced the phraseology of that album. Marriott's next band, Humble Pie, continued to perform a portion of 'Wham Bam' live during 1969 and 1970, as part of a lengthy medley built around their cover of Dr. John's 'Walk On Gilded Splinters'.

"Afterglow" was recorded during March 1968 at Olympic Studios, London. "Wham Bam Thank You Ma'am" was recorded during September 1968 at Olympic Studios, London. Both tracks were produced by Steve Marriott and Ronnie Lane and engineered by Glyn Johns.

The release was officially designated as a double A-side, although most radio playlisters favoured 'Afterglow'.

In November 1969, Immediate released a final unauthorised Small Faces double album, entitled The Autumn Stone. It featured the majority of their hits for both Immediate and their previous label Decca Records, different stereo mixes of both sides of the 'Afterglow' single, a handful of unreleased tracks, and three live tracks recorded at Newcastle City Hall in November 1968.

The various versions of 'Afterglow' and 'Wham Bam Thank You Ma'am' (plus new remixes of both songs) and 'Me You And Us Too' were eventually compiled together on the box set "Here Come The Nice: The Immediate Years" in 2013.

Due to Rod Stewart's later association with the band as the Faces, the 'bluesy' mix of "Wham Bam Thank You Ma'am" has also been released under the title "Sparky Rides" or "Sparky Riders", erroneously credited to Stewart, on several budget CD compilations and other unofficial grey market releases that contain other similarly mistitled and miscredited Small Faces tracks.

== Cover versions ==
- Australian singer-songwriter Daryl Braithwaite covered the song in October 1977. The single peaked at number 37 on the Kent Music Report.
- Quiet Riot covered the song on their second album Quiet Riot II (1978), and released a remixed acoustic version on The Randy Rhoads Years (1993).
- Great White covered the song on their 1991 album Hooked
- Flo & Eddie covered the song on the album Flo & Eddie (1973).

== Song references ==
- "Wham Bam Thank You Ma'am": In 1972 David Bowie, an avowed fan of the Small Faces, referenced the song by using the phrase in his own song, Suffragette City. However, while it is true that Bowie was indeed a fan of the band and his use of the term very likely is a nod of appreciation to them, it should be pointed out that the phrase itself was already a recognised slang term (especially in the US) even before the Small Faces had used it.

== Charts ==
Weekly chart performance for "Afterglow of Your Love"
Chart (1969)	Peak position
Austria (Disc Parade)	14
Denmark (DR Top 10)	7
Malaysia (Radio Malaysia)	7
Netherlands (Dutch Top 40)	19
Netherlands (Single Top 100)	19
New Zealand (Listener)	14
UK (BMRB)	36

== See also ==
- Small Faces discography
