= Rise (Daryl Braithwaite album) =

Studio album by Daryl Braithwaite
- Released: 23 November 1990
- Recorded: July–October 1990
- Studio: Metropolis Audio (Melbourne, Australia)
- Label: CBS
- Producer: Simon Hussey

Daryl Braithwaite chronology
Edge (1988)	Rise (1990)	Higher Than Hope (1991)

Singles from Rise
- 1. "Rise" Released: 5 November 1990; 2. "The Horses" Released: 28 January 1991; 3. "Higher Than Hope" Released: 27 May 1991; 4. "Don't Hold Back Your Love" Released: 19 August 1991; 5. "Nothing to Lose" Released: 27 January 1992

Rise is an album by Daryl Braithwaite released in November 1990. The album reached No. 3 on the Australian ARIA Charts. It was the best-selling album in Australia in 1991. The album sold over 300,000 copies in Australia.

Braithwaite was nominated for Best Male Artist at the ARIA Music Awards of 1991 for Rise, but lost to Chain Reaction by John Farnham.

Braithwaite commenced a national tour on 26 December 1990 in Warrnambool.

Although this album was not officially released in the U.S., it includes what would become Braithwaite's biggest stateside hit, "Higher Than Hope", which reached number 47 on the Billboard Hot 100. The tune appeared as the title track for a compilation album, Higher Than Hope, which was released to the American market in 1991.

The album was certified 4× platinum in Australia in 2016. It was written based on his travel to China as a tourist in 1989.

== Track listing ==
1. "Rise" (Paul Read, Danny McCarthy) – 3:56
2. "Nothing to Lose" (Mike Caen, Steve Bull) – 4:08
3. "Modern Times" (Roger Hart, Paul Bell) – 5:12
4. "Ghost There Waiting" (Jef Scott) – 2:55
5. "Waters Rising" (Simon Hussey) – 4:24
6. "Higher Than Hope" (Simon Hussey, Daryl Braithwaite) – 4:59
7. "Don't Hold Back Your Love" (David Tyson, Richard Page, Gerald O'Brien) – 5:09
8. "The Horses" (Rickie Lee Jones, Walter Becker) – 4:16
9. "Where the Famous Came Out to Play" (Jef Scott) – 4:28
10. "I Can See Higher Than Before" (Daryl Braithwaite) – 3:49
11. "Poverty Dancing" (Phil Manikiza) – 3:53
12. "Goodbye Blue Sky" (Simon Hussey, James Reyne) – 3:54

== Personnel ==
- Daryl Braithwaite – vocals, harmonica on "Waters Rising", Hammond Leslie organ on "Higher than Hope"
- Simon Hussey – keyboards, electric piano, nylon string acoustic guitar (tracks 5 and 12), drum machine (tracks 5–7, 9, and 12), synth bass (tracks 5 and 6), Hammond organ and brass arrangements on "Higher than Hope" (track 6), producer
- Jef Scott – acoustic guitars, electric guitars; bass (tracks 1, 10–12), mandolin (tracks 1 and 5), Dobro (tracks 5, 7, and 9), backing vocals (track 9)
- Andy Cichon – bass (tracks 2, 3, and 5–7)
- John Watson – drums (all tracks except 9 and 10)
- Scott Griffiths – keyboards (tracks 3, 7, 8, 10, and 11), piano (tracks 7 and 8), Hammond organ (tracks 7, 9, and 10), orchestral introduction (track 11)
- "The Brasstards" (tracks 2 and 6)
  - Mark Dennison – saxophone
  - Kevin Dubber – trumpet
- Tommy Emmanuel – electric guitars (tracks 1 and 8)
- Alex Pertout – percussion (tracks 1, 7, and 8), tuned percussion (tracks 5 and 12), tambourine (track 11)
- Dino Baptiste – harmonica (track 1)
- Jeremy Alsop – bass (track 8)
- Chuck Hargreaves – acoustic guitars (track 12)
- John Farnham – backing vocals (tracks 1, 3, 6, 10, and 12)
- Graeme Strachan – backing vocals (track 2)
- Margaret Urlich – backing vocals (track 8)

== Release history ==
Country	Date	Label	Format	Catalog
Australia	1990	CBS	CD	467675 2

== Chart positions ==
=== Weekly charts ===
Chart (1990–92)	Peak position
Australian Albums (ARIA)	3

=== Year-end charts ===
Chart (1991)	Position
Australian ARIA Albums Chart	1

=== Singles ===
Release date	Single	Peak chart positions	
Release date	Single	AUS	US
November 1990	"Rise"	23	—
January 1991	"The Horses"	1	—
May 1991	"Higher Than Hope"	28	47
August 1991	"Don't Hold Back Your Love"	55	–
January 1992	"Nothing to Lose"	100	–
"—" denotes the single did not chart or was not released in that country

== Certifications ==
Region	Certification	Certified units/sales
Australia (ARIA)	4× Platinum	280,000^{^}
^{^} Shipments figures based on certification alone.
