= Rise (Daryl Braithwaite song) =

Single by Daryl Braithwaite

from the album Rise
- B-side: "Where the Famous Came Out to Play"
- Released: 5 November 1990
- Length: 4:06
- Label: CBS
- Songwriters: Paul Read, Danny McCarthy
- Producer: Simon Hussey

Daryl Braithwaite singles chronology
"Sugar Train" (1989)	"Rise" (1990)	"The Horses" (1991)

"Rise" is a song by Australian singer Daryl Braithwaite, released as the lead single from his third studio album, Rise. The single was released in November 1990 and peaked at number 23 on the Australian Singles Chart. "Rise" was originally written and performed by the Chosen Few.

== Track listing ==
CD single

1. "Rise" – 3:56
2. "Where the Famous Came Out to Play" – 4:28

== Charts ==
Weekly chart performance for "Rise"
Chart (1990)	Peak position
Australia (ARIA)	23
