= Edge (album) =

Studio album by Daryl Braithwaite
- Released: 4 November 1988
- Recorded: May 1988, Platinum Studios, Melbourne, Australia
- Genre: Pop rock, Soft rock
- Length: 54:15
- Label: CBS
- Producer: Simon Hussey

Daryl Braithwaite chronology
Out on the Fringe (1979)	Edge (1988)	Rise (1990)

Professional ratings
Review scores
Source	Rating
AllMusic	4/5 stars

Edge is an album by Daryl Braithwaite. It was recorded between April–September 1988 and released in November 1988. It reached No.1 on the Australian ARIA Charts for 3 weeks in 1989.

Braithwaite toured the album across Australia and New Zealand in 1989 and the album was certified 3× platinum in October 1989. By 1991, the album had sold 100,000 copies in Europe.

Simon Hussey was nominated for Producer of the Year for Edge at the ARIA Music Awards of 1989, but lost to Age of Reason.

== Track listing ==
1. "As the Days Go By" (Ian Thomas) – 4:04
2. "You Could Be Wrong" (Simon Hussey) – 3:22
3. "All I Do" (Thomas) – 4:06
4. "Let Me Be" (Hussey, David Reyne) – 5:36
5. "Sugar Train" (Jef Scott) – 3:42
6. "Down Down" (Scott) – 4:37 {CD/cassette bonus track}
7. "In My Life" (Chris Doheny) – 5:08 {CD/cassette bonus track}
8. "Edge (Instrumental)" (Jef Scott, Simon Hussey) – 0:34
9. "I Don't Remember" (Peter Gabriel) – 4:09 {CD/cassette bonus track}
10. "One Summer" (Daryl Braithwaite) – 3:43
11. "It's All in the Music" (Braithwaite, Garth Porter) – 3:40
12. "All The Same" (Hussey, Lisa Bade, Mark Greig) – 3:57
13. "Up-Out" (Andy Cichon, Braithwaite, Scott, John Watson, Scott Griffiths, Hussey) – 3:58
14. "Pretending to Care" (Todd Rundgren) – 3:39

== Personnel ==
- Daryl Braithwaite – vocals
- Andy Cichon – bass
- Jef Scott – guitars, keyboards, additional backing vocals, additional drumming
- John Watson – drums
- Simon Hussey – keyboards, drum machine, producer
- Scott Griffiths – keyboards
- John Farnham – additional backing vocals
- Glenn Braithwaite – additional backing vocals
- David Hussey – additional drumming
- Brett Kingman – guitar (on track "Up-Out")

== Release history ==
Country	Date	Label	Format	Catalog
Australia	1988	CBS	CD	462625 2
Australia	1988	CBS	LP	462625 1
Australia	1988	CBS	Cassette	462625 4

== Chart positions ==
=== Weekly charts ===
Chart (1988/89)	Peak position
Australian Albums (ARIA)	1
Norwegian Albums (VG-lista)	14
Swedish Albums (Sverigetopplistan)	24

=== Year-end charts ===
Chart (1989)	Position
Australian ARIA Albums Chart	5

=== Singles ===
Release date	Single	Peak chart positions			
Release date	Single	AUS	NZ	NOR	SWE
September 1988	As the Days Go By	11	49	—	—
October 1988	All I Do	23	—	—	—
January 1989	One Summer	8	—	5	4
April 1989	Let Me Be	26	—	—	—
July 1989	Sugar Train	—	—	—	—
"—" denotes the single did not chart or was not released in that country

== Certifications ==
Region	Certification	Certified units/sales
Australia (ARIA)	4× Platinum	280,000^{^}
^{^} Shipments figures based on certification alone.

== See also ==
List of number-one albums in Australia during the 1980s
