= Higher Than Hope =

1991 single by Daryl Braithwaite

Single by Daryl Braithwaite

from the album Rise
- B-side: "You Will Find a Way"
- Released: 27 May 1991
- Genre: Pop
- Length: 4:29
- Label: CBS
- Songwriters: Simon Hussey, Daryl Braithwaite
- Producer: Simon Hussey

Daryl Braithwaite singles chronology
"The Horses" (1991)	"Higher Than Hope" (1991)	"Don't Hold Back Your Love" (1991)

"Higher Than Hope" is the third single released by Australian singer Daryl Braithwaite from his third studio album, Rise (1990). The single was released in May 1991 and peaked at number 28 on the Australian ARIA Singles Chart. The song also peaked at number 47 on the US Billboard Hot 100 and number 73 on the Canadian RPM 100 Hit Tracks chart, becoming his only single to chart in these countries. Braithwaite promoted the single in US from 18 June to 31 July 1990 and the music video was filmed in Los Angeles. It is one of the few songs in Braithwaite's repertoire to feature him playing an instrument in addition to singing. At the APRA Music Awards of 1992 the song won Most Performed Australian Work.

== Background ==
According to an interview conducted shortly after the release of the Rise album, Braithwaite titled the song after the Nelson Mandela biography of the same name, based on lyrical ideas from song co-writer and producer Simon Hussey. Hussey had first drawn inspiration for the tune from watching a newscast showing riots in South Africa. Braithwaite felt that the title "Higher Than Hope" was consistent with the message that both he and Hussey were endeavoring to convey with the song, namely the notion of, as Braithwaite describes, going beyond "just wishing about" the resolution of conflict. He also felt that the song was "very idealistic in a sense."

In May 1991, "Higher Than Hope" was among the most added songs to contemporary hit radio in the United States. For the week ending 1 June 1991, the song debuted at No. 78 on the US Billboard Hot 100. That same month, a music video for the song was added to VH1.

== Track listing ==
CD single

1. "Higher Than Hope" (single edit) – 4:29
2. "You Will Find a Way" – 4:20

== Personnel ==
- Daryl Braithwaite – lead vocals, Hammond Leslie organ
- Simon Hussey – keyboards, Hammond organ, synth bass, drum machine, brass arrangements
- Jef Scott – electric guitar, acoustic guitar
- Andy Cichon – bass guitar
- John Watson – drums
- "The Brasstards":
  - Mark Dennison – saxophone
  - Kevin Dubber – trumpet
- John Farnham – backing vocals

== Charts ==
Weekly chart performance for "Higher Than Hope"
Chart (1991)	Peak position
Australia (ARIA)	28
Canada Top Singles (RPM)	73
US Pop Airplay (Billboard)	32
US Billboard Hot 100	47
US Cash Box Top 100	44
