= One Summer (song) =

Single by Daryl Braithwaite

from the album Edge
- B-side: "Pretending to Care"
- Released: 27 January 1989
- Genre: Acoustic rock, Pop rock, Soft rock
- Length: 3:43
- Label: CBS
- Songwriter: Daryl Braithwaite
- Producer: Simon Hussey

Daryl Braithwaite singles chronology
"All I Do" (1988)	"One Summer" (1989)	"Let Me Be" (1989)

"One Summer" is a single by Daryl Braithwaite from his 1988 album Edge. Braithwaite was inspired to write the song by the British television series One Summer. The single reached No. 8 in Australia, No. 5 in Norway and No. 4 in Sweden. It was certified gold in Australia.

A music video was created for the song. It features footage of various people at the beach mixed with shots of Braithwaite, Chuck Hargreaves (in a red shirt) and John "Jak" Housden (in a yellow shirt) playing the song on the front porch of a rural property.

Braithwaite performed the song live on Hey, Hey, It's Saturday on 16 February 1989.

== Track listing ==
- Side A "One Summer" – 3:42
- Side B "Pretending to Care" – 3:39

== Charts ==
=== Weekly charts ===
Weekly chart performance for "One Summer"
Chart (1988)	Peak position
Australia (ARIA)	8
Norway (VG-lista)	5
Sweden (Sverigetopplistan)	4

=== Year-end charts ===
Year-end chart performance for "One Summer"
Chart (1989)	Position
Australia (ARIA)	45

== Certification ==
Certifications for "One Summer"
Region	Certification	Certified units/sales
Australia (ARIA)	Gold	35,000^{^}
^{^} Shipments figures based on certification alone.
