= The Horses =

1991 single by Daryl Braithwaite

Single by Daryl Braithwaite

from the album Rise
- B-side: "I Can't Wait"
- Released: 28 January 1991
- Genre: Pop
- Length: 4:16
- Label: CBS
- Songwriters: Rickie Lee Jones, Walter Becker
- Producer: Simon Hussey

Daryl Braithwaite singles chronology
"Rise" (1990)	"The Horses" (1991)	"Higher Than Hope" (1991)

"The Horses" is a song written by Rickie Lee Jones and Walter Becker. It was originally performed by Jones on her 1989 album, Flying Cowboys. While not released as a single, the original version did appear in the 1996 film Jerry Maguire and was also included on the film's soundtrack. The song was covered in 1990 by Daryl Braithwaite; his version reached No. 1 in Australia, and by 2022, it had been certified decuple platinum.

== Background and release ==
The song was covered by Daryl Braithwaite on his 1990 album Rise. It was released as a single on 28 January 1991 and reached No. 1 on the Australian Singles Chart in May. "The Horses" has been certified ten-times platinum in Australia by the Australian Recording Industry Association (ARIA). Margaret Urlich provided the female vocals on the recording but chose not to appear in the music video due to other work commitments. A model, Gillian Mather, lip-synced Urlich's voice for the music video.

In May 2016, while celebrating the 25th anniversary of the song peaking at No. 1 in Australia, Braithwaite said: "I would never have thought that 25 years down the track, 'The Horses' – a song that I heard quite by accident and then recorded, would be liked by so many people for so many different reasons. And for this I am eternally grateful. I am sure that Rickie Lee Jones and Walter Becker could never imagine how endearing the song would and has become."

== Reception ==
In January 2018, as part of Triple M's "Ozzest 100", the "most Australian" songs of all time, Daryl Braithwaite's version of "The Horses" was ranked number 14. In 2025, the song placed 30 in the Triple J Hottest 100 of Australian Songs.

== Track listings ==
Australian 7-inch, CD, and cassette single

1. "The Horses" − 4:16
2. "I Can't Wait" − 4:12

European maxi-CD single

1. "The Horses" − 4:16
2. "Let Me Be" − 5:36
3. "You Could Be Wrong" − 3:23
4. "I Can't Wait" − 4:12

== Personnel ==
- Daryl Braithwaite – vocals
- John Watson – drums
- Scott Griffiths – keyboards, piano
- Jef Scott – acoustic and electric guitar
- Tommy Emmanuel – electric guitar
- Alex Pertout – shaker, sleigh bells, vibraslap, tambourine
- Jeremy Alsop – bass
- Simon Hussey – keyboards
- Margaret Urlich – backing vocals

== Charts ==
"The Horses" made its ARIA Top 100 Singles Chart debut at No. 38 on 3 March 1991 before peaking at No. 1 on 19 May 1991. The song spent 23 weeks in the Australian top 50.

=== Weekly charts ===
Chart (1991)	Peak position
Australia (ARIA)	1

=== Year-end charts ===
Chart (1991)	Position
Australia (ARIA)	4

== Certifications ==
Region	Certification	Certified units/sales
Australia (ARIA)	10× Platinum	700,000^{‡}
^{‡} Sales+streaming figures based on certification alone.

== See also ==
- List of best-selling singles in Australia
