= Daryl Braithwaite =

Australian singer (born 1949)

- Braithwaite performing at Caboolture RSL in June 2009

Background information
- Born: 11 January 1949 (age 77); Melbourne, Victoria, Australia
- Origin: Sydney, New South Wales, Australia
- Genre: Pop
- Occupation: Singer
- Instruments: Vocals, guitar, keyboards
- Years active: 1967–present
- Labels: Festival; Sony; independent
- Website: darylbraithwaite.com.au

Braithwaite performing "Love Songs" in 2020.

Daryl Braithwaite (born 11 January 1949) is an Australian singer. He was the lead vocalist of Sherbet (1970–1984 and many subsequent reunions). Braithwaite also has a solo career, placing 15 singles in the Australian top 40, including two number-one hits: "You're My World" (October 1974) and "The Horses" (January 1991). His second studio album, Edge (November 1988), reached No. 1 on the ARIA Albums Chart, No. 14 in Norway and No. 24 in Sweden.

In 2017, Braithwaite was inducted into the ARIA Hall of Fame.

== Biography ==
=== Early years ===
Daryl Braithwaite and his twin brother, Glenn, were born on 11 January 1949 and were raised in a working-class family in Melbourne, Australia. His father, a plumber, worked on the Snowy Mountains Scheme in the mid-1950s. Braithwaite attended Punt Road State School and Christ Church Grammar in South Yarra, where the twins sang in the school choir. He later said: "I will always recall the horror of my first solo in the choir singing 'Hark The Herald Angels Sing' when the choir master, Leonard Fullard, gave me a note and then suddenly I was on my own. It was terrifying." In 1961, Braithwaite was in the same class as Olivia Newton-John.

In 1963, his family moved to the Sydney beach-side suburb of Coogee, where he attended Randwick Boys High School until the end of year 10. He then began a fitter-and-turner apprenticeship, set up by his father, which he completed in 1969, but decided that this was not the career path for him and decided to pursue a musical career instead. As a teenager, he sang in various local pop music groups, first with Bright Lights, in 1967, which included Bruce Worrall on bass guitar. Braithwaite and Worrall were both in House of Bricks and then Samael Lilith.

In March 1970, at the age of 21, he joined Sherbet, a pop band that had already released a single, "Crimson Ships". That group had formed in April 1969 with the line-up of Dennis Laughlin on lead vocals (ex-Sebastian Hardie Blues Band, Clapham Junction), Doug Rea on bass guitar (Downtown Roll Band), Sammy See on organ, guitar and vocals (Clapham Junction), Clive Shakespeare on lead guitar and vocals (Downtown Roll Band), and Danny Taylor on drums (Downtown Roll Band). They secured a residency at Jonathon's Disco, playing seven hours a night, four days a week for eight months. Braithwaite was hired as the group's second lead vocalist, but within a few months Laughlin left, and former bandmate Worrall replaced Rea on bass guitar.

Sherbet's second single, "Can You Feel It, Baby?" (September 1971), featured Braithwaite's gritty-but-polished lead vocals and became the group's first national Top-40 hit, on the Go-Set singles chart. According to Australian musicologist Ian McFarlane, Sherbet were "one of the country's biggest bands over the next ten years", and Braithwaite rose to national fame as their lead singer. His soul-influenced vocals and the group's pop styling was heard on a series of singles and albums throughout the 1970s; they provided an additional 19 hits on the national charts in that decade.

=== Early solo career: 1973–1979 ===
Braithwaite started a parallel solo career alongside his work in Sherbet. In March 1973, he played the lead role in the Australian musical theatre production of the Who's rock opera Tommy. In October of the following year, amidst unfounded rumours that he was leaving Sherbet, he issued his debut single, a cover version of "You're My World", which went to No. 1 for three weeks. The song was certified gold and sold more than 90,000 copies in Australia by mid-1975.

His next single, "Cavalry" (August 1975), was co-written with his Sherbet bandmate Tony Mitchell, which reached No. 13 on the Kent Music Report singles chart. "Cavalry" has been a rarity amongst Braithwaite's hits; like his contemporary John Farnham, most of his charting songs have been interpretations of material written by others. Two more top-20 singles followed, "Old Sid" (written by Warren Morgan) backed with Braithwaite's own song "Time" (April 1976) and "Love Has no Pride" (by Eric Kaz and Libby Titus), backed with "Fly Away" which Braithwaite co-wrote with Morgan (February 1977). His next single was a cover of Ronnie Lane and Steve Marriott's song "Afterglow (Of Your Love)", originally recorded by the Small Faces, in October 1977. At the TV Week King of Pop Awards, he was named King of Pop over the three consecutive years from 1975 to 1977.

Braithwaite's solo recordings from 1974 to 1978 appeared only on 7-inch singles. A compilation album of his singles, Daryl Braithwaite... Best Of, was issued in 1978 on Razzle Records/Festival Records. His debut solo studio album, Out on the Fringe, appeared in the following year, at a time when Sherbet had briefly broken up. He recorded that album in the United States with Steve Kipner and Terry Shaddick producing.

=== Solo career on hold: 1980–1987 ===
By 1980, the members of Sherbet were back together and had renamed themselves The Sherbs. At this point, Braithwaite put his solo career on hold to concentrate on work with his bandmates. However, The Sherbs had only a very few minor hits and broke up in 1984.

=== Comeback: 1988–1999 ===
In April 1988, Braithwaite began recording his comeback album Edge. This LP featured a somewhat more adult contemporary sound than Braithwaite's previous work, and it spawned four hit singles that returned him to the Australian singles charts after an absence of nearly a decade. Two of these hits, "As the Days Go By" and "All I Do", were penned by Canadian songwriter Ian Thomas; a third, "One Summer", was a Braithwaite original.

Braithwaite went on to have a number of solo hits in the early 1990s, including the Australian No. 1 "The Horses", a cover of a Rickie Lee Jones recording written by Jones and Walter Becker. He also made his first US chart appearance as a solo artist at No. 47 with the 1991 single "Higher Than Hope", a song he co-wrote with Simon Hussey. By the end of 1991, Braithwaite's Rise album had become Australia's biggest-selling album of the year, and Edge had become the best-selling album ever released by Sony Music Australia to that time. The album sold more than 300,000 copies in Australia alone.

Braithwaite then worked alongside Jef Scott, Simon Hussey and James Reyne to create the 1992 self-titled album Company of Strangers. Braithwaite sang lead or co-lead vocals on four of the album's tracks, including two Australian top-40 singles: "Motor City (I Get Lost)" (No. 26, 1992) and "Daddy's Gonna Make You a Star" (No. 35, 1993).

His comeback success was somewhat derailed by a 1992 lawsuit, in which his former managers sued Braithwaite for back-payment of fees owing. The suit was successful, and Braithwaite essentially had to give up all the revenue he made from Edge and Rise as well as a portion of the revenue from his next album, 1993's Taste the Salt; and, after a 1994 best-of collection was released, Braithwaite was dropped by his record company. He did not record another album for 12 years.

He was a member of A Current Affair's "Kokoda Challenge" in 1996, where he travelled to Papua New Guinea and did a 100-kilometre, nine-day trek of the Kokoda Trail with other celebrities Angry Anderson, Grant Kenny, Colette Mann and Dermott Brereton to retrace the steps of Australian Diggers to mark the end of World War II, 51 years previously. His own father had served in Papua New Guinea during the war and he wanted to experience something of what he had to endure. He stated that it was the toughest test he had faced: "I was determined to make it, no matter what. But it was really, really hard."

In the interim, Braithwaite toured regularly, and in 1997 he returned to the musical theatre stage in the Melbourne production of Chess. From 1999 onwards, he also resumed occasional touring with a reunited Sherbet.

=== 2005–present ===
After more than a decade away from the recording studio, Braithwaite featured on the track "The Euphonious Whale" from James Reyne's 2005 album, And the Horse You Rode in On. A new studio album from Braithwaite titled Snapshot appeared later in 2005. It included four songs co-written by Braithwaite, including "See You Around Sometime", which was written with Mark Seymour and had been previously recorded by Seymour for his album One Eyed Man.

In 2006, Braithwaite sang on two new Sherbs tracks specially recorded for a greatest-hits compilation, Super Hits; they were The Sherbs' first new recordings in 22 years. Braithwaite then resumed his solo career with the 2008 release of The Lemon Tree, an album of acoustic reworkings of both solo and Sherbet hits, and a few covers.

In 2007, Braithwaite performed "One Summer" on the soap opera Neighbours.

In 2013, Braithwaite was re-signed by Sony Music Australia. CEO Denis Handlin said in a statement: "Daryl is an icon of the Australian music industry and we are delighted to welcome him home to Sony Music." He released his first album of new material since 2005, titled Forever the Tourist. It featured the lead single "Not Too Late". The album peaked at number 47.

At the ARIA Music Awards of 2017, Braithwaite was inducted into the ARIA Hall of Fame by Jimmy Barnes. To coincide, Sony Music Australia released a new compilation, Days Go By, which debuted at No. 5.

In June 2020, Braithwaite released the single "Love Songs", which became his first top-50 single in 27 years.

On 4 March 2023, Braithwaite joined pop-star, Harry Styles, on stage at the Accor Stadium in Sydney, Australia. Together, the artists performed "The Horses" to an audience of 83,000 fans.

In June 2026, Braithwaite announced that he would not play any more live shows due to physical difficulties.

== Discography ==
=== Solo albums ===
- Out on the Fringe (1979)
- Edge (1988)
- Rise (1990)
- Taste the Salt (1993)
- Snapshot (2005)
- The Lemon Tree (2008)
- Forever the Tourist (2013)

=== Compilations ===
- Daryl Braithwaite... Best Of (1978)
- Higher Than Hope (1991) (An international release combining tracks from Rise and Edge)
- Six Moons: The Best of 1988–1994 (1994)
- Afterglow: The Essential Collection 1971–1994 (2002)
- The Essential Daryl Braithwaite (2007)
- Days Go By (2017)

=== Featured on ===
- Company of Strangers (with James Reyne): Company of Strangers (1993).

== Awards and nominations ==
=== APRA Awards ===
The APRA Awards are presented annually from 1982 by the Australasian Performing Right Association (APRA), "honouring composers and songwriters". They commenced in 1982.

Year	Nominee / work	Award	Result	Ref.
2021	"Love Songs" (Michael Fatkin, Rosalind Crane, David Snyder)	Song of the Year	Shortlisted	

=== ARIA Music Awards ===
The ARIA Music Awards is an annual awards ceremony that recognises excellence, innovation, and achievement across all genres of Australian music. They commenced in 1987.

Year	Category	Nominated artist/work	Result
1989	Producer of the Year	Edge	Nominated
1991	Best Male Artist	Rise	Nominated
1992	Best Male Artist	"The Horses"	Nominated
1992	Single of the Year	"The Horses"	Nominated
1992	Highest Selling Single	"The Horses"	Nominated
1992	Producer Of The Year	"The Horses"	Won
1994	Engineer of the Year	"Barren Ground" & "The World as It Is"	Won
2017	ARIA Hall of Fame Inductee	Himself	inductee

=== King of Pop Awards ===
The King of Pop Awards were voted by the readers of TV Week. The King of Pop award started in 1967 and ran through to 1978.

Year	Nominee / work	Award	Result
1975	himself (Sherbet)	King of Pop	Won
1976	himself (Sherbet)	King of Pop	Won
1977	himself (Sherbet)	King of Pop	Won

=== TV Week / Countdown Awards ===
Countdown was an Australian pop music TV series on national broadcaster ABC-TV from 1974 to 1987, it presented music awards from 1979 to 1987, initially in conjunction with magazine TV Week. The TV Week / Countdown Awards were a combination of popular-voted and peer-voted awards.

Year	Nominee / work	Award	Result
1979	himself	Most Popular Male Performer	Nominated
