= Simon Hussey =

Australian musician and producer (born 1960)

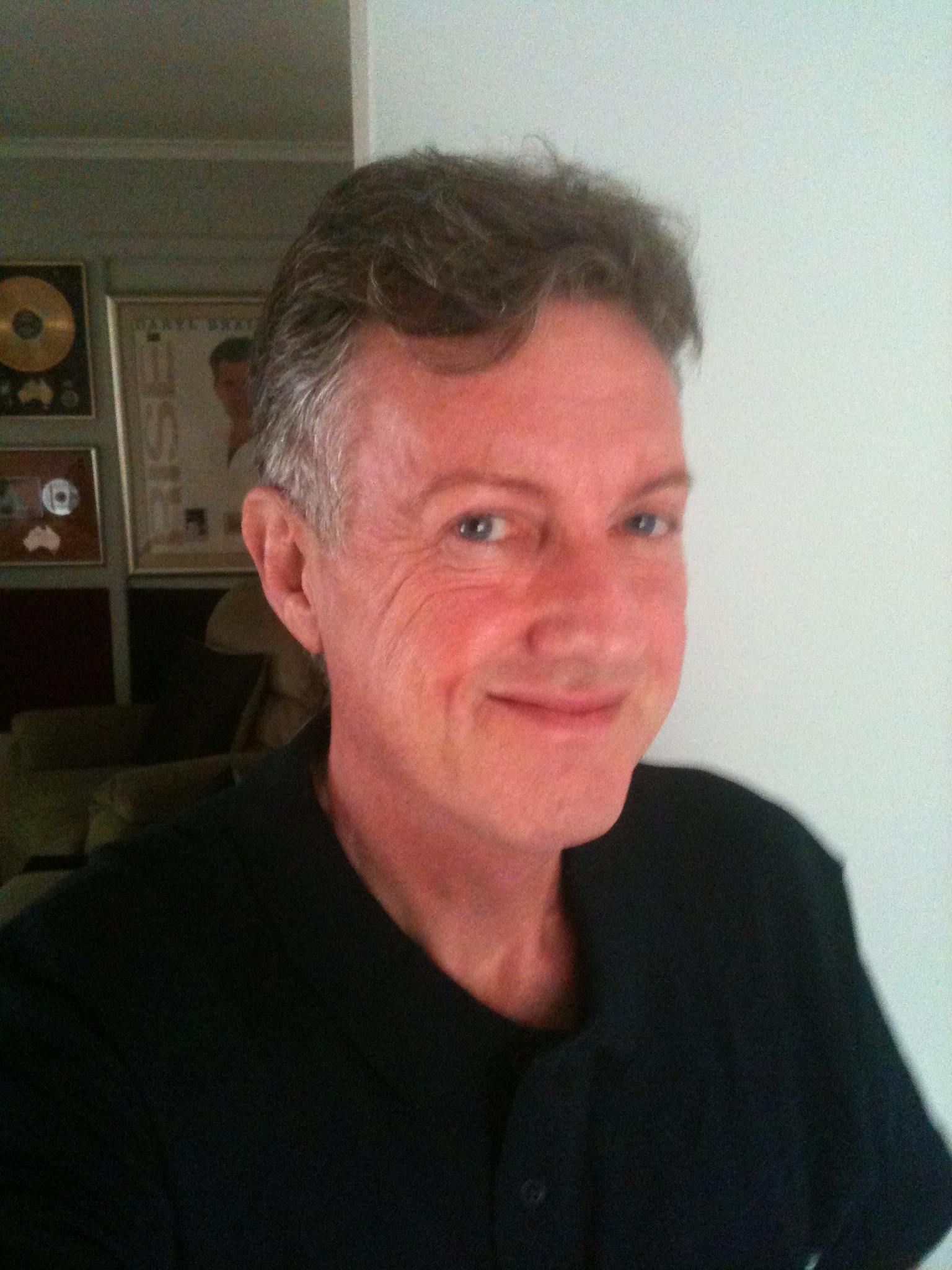

Background information
- Born: Simon Cyril Hussey; 7 July 1960 (age 66); Lismore, Victoria, Australia
- Origin: Mt Eliza, Victoria, Australia
- Genres: Rock; pop; orchestral
- Occupations: Musician; songwriter; record producer; audio engineer
- Instruments: Keyboards; backing vocals; drum machine programming; guitar
- Years active: 1984–2021
- Labels: Freestyle; Sony; Warner Chappell; EMI; Virgin
- Spouse: Elisabeth Reyne (m. 1988; div. 1998)
- Children: 1

Simon Cyril Hussey (born 7 July 1960) is an Australian multi-instrumentalist, songwriter-arranger, record producer and audio engineer. In 1984 he formed Cats Under Pressure on keyboards with David Reyne (ex-Australian Crawl) on vocals and Mark Greig on guitar. On the Australian Crawl album Between a Rock and a Hard Place (August 1985), Hussey co-wrote four tracks with the band's lead singer, James Reyne (David's older brother). In 1987 when James undertook his solo career, Hussey joined his backing band on keyboards, and co-wrote six tracks for James' debut self-titled album including top 10 hit singles, "Hammerhead" (October) and "Motor's Too Fast" (June 1988). In May 1988 Hussey was the producer, and provided keyboards and song writing, for Edge (November), the comeback album by Daryl Braithwaite (ex-Sherbet), which peaked at No. 1 on the ARIA Albums Chart for three weeks in mid-1989.

Hussey worked on further solo material by both Braithwaite and James Reyne. In 1991 Hussey formed Company of Strangers with Braithwaite, Reyne and Jef Scott (backing and session musician for both artists). The group issued a self-titled debut album (November 1992) which peaked at No. 9, and provided three top 40 singles "Sweet Love" (June), "Motor City (I Get Lost)" (September), and "Daddy's Gonna Make You a Star" (January 1993). At the ARIA Music Awards of 1992 Hussey won Producer of the Year for his work on various tracks: Craig McLachlan's "On My Own"; Braithwaite's "The Horses", "Higher Than Hope" and "Don't Hold Back Your Love"; and James Reyne's "Slave". For "The Horses" Margaret Urlich provided backing vocals. Hussey won the same category in 1993 for Braithwaite's "Nothing to Lose"; and Company of Strangers' three singles. In 1994 he won Engineer of the Year for Braithwaite's "Barren Ground" and "The World as It Is"; and Company of Strangers' "Baby, You're a Rich Man" and "Daddy's Gonna Make You a Star". He was nominated for five ARIA Music Awards for his production or engineering work. Hussey has received two APRA Music Awards for his song writing.

== Biography ==
Simon Cyril Hussey, was born on 7 July 1960 in Lismore – a town 170 kilometres (106 mi) west of Melbourne and grew up in Mount Eliza and was educated at Peninsula Grammar. During the 1980s and 1990s Hussey was a Supreme Court legal reporter recording and transcribing criminal and civil court cases when not working in the music industry on a full-time basis. In the early 1980s he was the record producer on a single for Lisa Bade, which included Mark Greig (ex-Runners) on guitar.

Cats Under Pressure were a pop band formed in Melbourne in 1984 with Hussey on guitar, keyboards and backing vocals; Greig on guitar and David Reyne (ex-Australian Crawl) on drums and lead vocals. In that year they issued a single - Let me be on Freestyle Records – the label owned by Reyne's former bandmates from Australian Crawl. it was self produced from Hussey's original demo tapes.

In 1985, Greig joined the Australian Crawl demo and writing recording sessions for their next studio album which was engineered by Hussey at Regency Recordings 8 track studio in South Melbourne. The band later employed Adam Kidron to produce their fourth album which was to be become Between a Rock and a Hard Place Hussey co-wrote four of the album's tracks with lead singer, James Reyne. Meanwhile, Cats Under Pressure recorded another single, "On Again Off Again", in September, which was issued later that year. Greig remained with Australian Crawl until they disbanded in 1986.

=== James Reyne and Daryl Braithwaite projects ===
Hussey joined the James Reyne Band and worked on Reyne's self-titled debut solo album (September 1987), co-writing six tracks with the artist. Four of these were issued as singles, "Hammerhead" (October), "Heaven on a Stick" (February 1988), "Motor's Too Fast" (June) and "Always the Way" (November). James later told Debbie Kruger that "['Hammerhead'] was not necessarily about me, but let's say I thought I knew what I was talking about. I wrote it with Simon Hussey; the music Simon and I wrote together and I wrote the lyrics. From memory it seemed to come quite easily". The album peaked at No. 4 on the Australian Kent Music Report Albums Chart, while "Hammerhead" reached No. 8 and "Motor's Too Fast" at No. 4 on the related Kent Music Report Singles Chart. "Motor's Too Fast" also reached No. 6 on the ARIA Singles Chart.

Hussey at piano, recording Daryl Braithwaite's solo album, Edge, during May 1988

During May 1988 Hussey was the record producer and arranger on Daryl Braithwaite's comeback solo album, Edge, which was issued in November. He also played keyboards, programmed the drum machine and wrote or co-wrote four tracks: "You Could Be Wrong" (by Hussey), "Let Me Be" (from Cats Under Pressure, by Hussey and David Reyne), "All the Same" (by Hussey, Bade and Greig) and "Edge" (by Hussey and Jef Scott). Edge peaked at No. 1 on the ARIA Albums Chart for three weeks in mid-1989. Kathryn Whitfield of The Canberra Times felt the album was "Verging on noddy-land, this piece of plastic is soft-sell. Easy listening, inoffensive, palatable, commercial pop music." She explained that "Hussey (keyboards) appears to have been the one to roll up his sleeves and get to work on material for this offering." Australian musicologist, Ian McFarlane, opined that the album and singles had "captured a wonderful summer-filled mood, and a sense of freedom and happiness". Four tracks on Edge had John Farnham on backing vocals.

In May 1991 Braithwaite told The Canberra Times' Bevan Hannan that he had met Hussey about two years before they worked on Edge. Braithwaite had heard some demos of Hussey's work and "in 1987 I approached him to produce the album and after quite a lot of hassling he said yes". In the following year Clinton Porteous of Rolling Stone described how "Braithwaite was trying to make a comeback... [and] record companies urged [him] to use a name producer... he insisted on the untried Hussey. 'I saw someone who was a little bit hesitant... a little shy but who was really talented ... he really did seem to care about the music... he doesn't do things half heartedly.' Braithwaite's instincts paid off: Edge went to Number One, relaunching his career."

By February 1989 Hussey was in London working on James' second solo album, Hard Reyne, he co-produced the album with John Hudson. By April that year Hussey was married to Elisabeth Reyne, younger sister of the Reyne brothers. Besides song writing Hussey also provided keyboards and programming. Whitfield described how "[the] lyrics (once you can understand them) are not exactly brilliant and lack much of the depth which Reyne displayed in his Crawl days" nevertheless Hussey made a "big contribution" to the album. The album peaked at No. 7 in June while Braithwaite's Edge was still at No. 1. Whilst in London, Hussey received his first ARIA Award nomination, in the category of Producer of the Year, at the ARIA Music Awards of 1989 for Edge.

Hussey produced Braithwaite's next album, Rise (November 1990), and provided a range of instrumentation: keyboards, electric piano, acoustic guitar, drum machine, synthesiser bass and Hammond organ. Hussey wrote or co-wrote three tracks including "Higher Than Hope" which was issued as the album's third single in June 1991. Rise peaked at No. 3 in May that year, while "Higher Than Hope" reached the top 30. John Farnham was a backing vocalist on that track. In June 1991, for United States and European markets, Braithwaite issued a compilation album, Higher Than Hope, which included tracks from Edge and Rise. Hussey was credited as a multi-instrumentalist, composer and producer. "Higher Than Hope" was reissued as a single for the US market and peaked at No. 47 on the Billboard Hot 100.

In June 1991 the Billboard magazine's singles reviewer of "Higher Than Hope" declared that "this pop/rock gem is so catchy that it should be an immediate top 40 add... slick production and offers an inspirational message of salvation." Fellow music journalist Glenn A. Baker described how "Hussey's man-of-all-trades reputation has soared over the past year with two major albums... Again, and in both cases, his involvement was almost equal to that of the artist... Braithwaite's recent U.S. charting single (Billboard top 40), "Higher than Hope", featured Hussey as producer, writer, and musician."

Also in that month Reyne released his next solo album, Electric Digger Dandy, with Hussey on keyboards; Hussey co-produced it with Jim Scott, Tony Joe White and Chris Lord-Alge; and co-wrote two tracks, "Take a Giant Step" and "Company of Strangers", with Reyne. In that year Hussey co-produced an album, Hands Free (March 1992), for actor-musician, Craig McLachlan. Hussey co-wrote six of its tracks with McLachlan including the lead single, "On My Own" (November 1991).

At the ARIA Music Awards of 1992 Hussey won his first award as Producer of the Year for his work on various tracks: McLachlan's "On My Own"; Braithwaite's "The Horses", "Higher than Hope" and "Don't Hold Back Your Love"; and Reyne's "Slave". The trophy was presented by visiting English artist, Julian Lennon. Hussey and Braithwaite won Most Performed Australian Work at the APRA Awards of 1992 for "Higher Than Hope".

=== Company of Strangers ===
Late in 1991 Hussey started a studio album project, Company of Strangers, with American Jef Scott (backing musician and songwriter for both Braithwaite and Reyne), which developed into a group with Braithwaite and Reyne joining. In December that year they recorded their debut studio album (November 1992) with Hussey on keyboards, drums and backing vocals, Braithwaite on lead vocals, Reyne on lead vocals and lead guitar, Scott on lead vocals, guitar, drums and bass guitar. It was produced by Hussey for Columbia Records and he shared song writing duties with Scott on almost all the tracks. McFarlane felt the album was "commercial rock pop" which provided three singles, "Sweet Love" (June 1992), "Motor City (I Get Lost)" (September) and "Daddy's Gonna Make You a Star" (January 1993).

The album reached No. 9 and all three singles peaked in the top 40. The album included a cover version of the Beatles track, "Baby, You're a Rich Man". According to Hannan "The first two singles from the release, 'Motor City' and 'Sweet Love', would go close to earning the 'most played' title during silly season rotation. And prepare to hear more of the squeaky clean 'made for FM' music because there is plenty more on offer on the album – but that isn't so bad."

Hussey in April 1993

At the ARIA Music Awards of 1993 Hussey won his second Producer of the Year trophy for his work on Braithwaite's "Nothing to Lose" and Company of Strangers' "Daddy's Gonna Make You a Star", "Motor City (I Get Lost)", and "Sweet Love". At the ceremony Company of Strangers were nominated for Breakthrough Artist – Album and "Motor City (I Get Lost)" for Breakthrough Artist – Single. "Daddy's Gonna Make You a Star" won Most Performed Australian Work at the APRA Awards of 1993 for its songwriters Hussey, Reyne and Scott. Also in that year Hussey produced Braithwaite's album, Taste the Salt (November), he provided keyboards and drum machine. It reached No. 13 on the Australian Albums Chart. At the ARIA Music Awards of 1994 Hussey won Engineer of the Year for Braithwaite's "Barren Ground" and "The World as It Is"; and Company of Strangers' "Baby, You're a Rich Man" and "Daddy's Gonna Make You a Star".

In early 1996 Hussey reunited with Reyne to write and record a new album. Hussey used his purpose-built studio for the project, however it was abandoned due to Reyne's record company, RooArt, cancelling funding for all of its artists months into recording without warning. For The Spirit of Christmas 1996, a Christmas-themed album by various artists for charities, Hussey played on and produced Reyne's version of "Silent Night".

In 1998 Hussey co-produced a debut single for a new artist and writer, Danielle Greenwood, "If I Am Cruel", which also appears on her four-track EP of the same name. He also recorded and mixed it, at Dan & Si-Fi's Recital Room, Melbourne. Hussey had been reluctant to produce again but, after recording some demo tracks, he was encouraged to become involved. The single received positive reviews with TV and radio airplay.

Hussey acknowledged his anxiety over public appearances and absence from industry functions in published interviews during the height of his career. Juke Magazine featured a front-page article, "Simon Hussey – The Invisible Man Steps Out", where he provided an extensive interview about his career. He made some TV appearances in interviews and performed as a keyboard player for James Reyne, Company of Strangers and Greenwood.

=== Legacy ===
Daryl Braithwaite's cover version of Rickie Lee Jones' album track, "The Horses", remained popular after 25 years. In May 2016 Braithwaite recalled "I rang Simon Hussey, who was producing Rise, and said, 'Simon, you've gotta listen to this. I'll bring it in tomorrow and I reckon we could do a version in the vein of 'As the Days Go By' from the first album, Edge. Anyway, I brought it in and they had a listen to it." He acknowledged that "you have to give credit to [Hussey], who then took [the original] version and turned it into more accessible pop, maybe. There's no doubt: I love it. I will fight for it, I will stick up for it. I know at the end of the day it's not mine."

Hussey worked as a backing vocal producer with artists during his active years, including, Farnham and Scott on Braithwaite's Edge and Rise albums, Shirley Strachan (ex-Skyhooks), Margaret Urlich and Dale Ryder of Boom Crash Opera on Rise, and Renée Geyer on Electric Digger Dandy by James Reyne.

== Discography ==
Credits adapted from Australian Rock Database and AllMusic:

Cats Under Pressure

- "Let Me Be" (single, 1984) – Freestyle Records (FREE-0001): keyboards
- "On Again Off Again" (single, 1985) – Freestyle Records (FREE-0006): keyboards

Company of Strangers

- Company of Strangers (7 December 1992) – Columbia Records (COL 472081 2): keyboards, drums, backing vocals

Production works

Simon Hussey as producer, co-producer, audio engineer and/or mixer

- Lisa Bade: – single (1984)
- Daryl Braithwaite: – Edge (November 1988), Rise (November 1990), Higher Than Hope (April 1991), Taste the Salt (November 1994), "Golden Miles" (1994)
- James Reyne: – Hard Reyne (May 1989), Electric Digger Dandy (June 1991), "Silent Night" (1996)
- Craig McLachlan: – Hands Free (March 1992)

== Awards and nominations ==
=== APRA Music Awards ===
These awards were established by Australasian Performing Right Association (APRA) in 1982 to honour the achievements of songwriters and music composers, and to recognise their song writing skills, sales and airplay performance, by its members annually. Simon Hussey has won two APRA Music Awards.

Year	Nominee / work	Award	Result
1992	"Higher Than Hope" (Simon Hussey, Daryl Braithwaite)	Most Performed Australian Work	Won
1993	"Daddy's Gonna Make You a Star" (Hussey, Jef Scott, James Reyne)	Most Performed Australian Work	Won

=== ARIA Music Awards ===
These awards have been presented by the Australian Record Industry Association (ARIA) since 1987. Simon Hussey has won three ARIA Music Awards from five nominations.

Year	Nominee / work	Award	Result
1989	Simon Hussey – Daryl Braithwaite's Edge	Producer of the Year	Nominated
1992	Simon Hussey – Craig McLachlan"s "On My Own"; Daryl Braithwaite's "The Horses", "Higher than Hope", "Don't Hold Back Your Love"; James Reyne's "Slave"	Producer of the Year	Won
1993	Simon Hussey – Daryl Braithwaite's "Nothing to Lose"; Company of Strangers' "Daddy's Gonna Make You a Star", "Motor City (I Get Lost)", "Sweet Love"	Producer of the Year	Won
1994	Simon Hussey – Daryl Braithwaite's "Barren Ground", "The World as It Is"; Company of Strangers' "Baby, You're a Rich Man", "Daddy's Gonna Make You a Star"	Engineer of the Year	Won
1994	Simon Hussey – Daryl Braithwaite's "Barren Ground", "The World as It Is"; Company of Strangers' "Baby, You're a Rich Man", "Daddy's Gonna Make You a Star"	Producer of the Year	Nominated
