= James Reyne discography =

- Studio albums: 12
- EPs: 1
- Live albums: 5
- Compilation albums: 5

The discography of Nigerian-born, Australian rock singer-songwriter James Reyne. He achieved fame as the lead singer of Australian Crawl and Company of Strangers. As a solo artist, Reyne has released 12 studio albums.

== Albums ==
=== Studio albums ===
List of studio albums, with selected chart positions and certifications
Title	Album details	Peak chart positions	Certifications (sales thresholds)
Title	Album details	AUS	Certifications (sales thresholds)
James Reyne	Released: September 1987; Format: LP, cassette; Label: Capitol, EMI (ST 746941)	4	ARIA: 2× Platinum
Hard Reyne	Released: May 1989; Format: LP, CD, cassette; Label: Capitol, EMI (ST 791874)	7	ARIA: Platinum
Electric Digger Dandy	Released: June 1991; Format: LP, cassette; Label: Virgin	3	ARIA: Gold
The Whiff of Bedlam	Released: October 1994; Format: CD, cassette; Label: RooArt (4509980932)	20	
Design for Living	Released: 23 February 1999; Format: CD, digital download; Label: Village Roadshow (101890-2 )	153	
Speedboats for Breakfast	Released: 19 April 2004; Format: CD, DD; Label: Liberation (LIBCD60932 )	113	
And the Horse You Rode in On	Released: 14 March 2005; Format: CD, DD; Label: Liberation Blue (BLUE076.5)	86	
Every Man a King	Released: 5 May 2007; Format: CD, DD; Label: Liberation (LIBCD92392)	141	
Ghost Ships	Released: 29 September 2007; Format: CD, digital download; Label: Liberation Blue (BLUE1552)	101	
TCB	Released: 12 April 2010; Format: CD, DD; Label: Liberation (LMCD0094)	32	
Thirteen	Released: 16 March 2012; Format: CD, DD; Label: Hammerhead, MGM (HHR1)	109	
Toon Town Lullaby	Released: 10 July 2020; Format: CD, DD, streaming; Label: Bloodlines	157	
"—" denotes releases that did not chart, or have no reliable sources of charting information.

=== Live albums ===
List of live albums, with selected details and chart positions
Title	Album details	Peak chart positions
Title	Album details	AUS
Live in Rio	Released: April 1996; Format: CD, digital download, cassette; Label: RooArt (74321444072 )	65
One Night in Melbourne	Released: December 2007; Format: CD/DVD; Label: Liberation (LIBDVD1084 / LMCD0063)	—
James Reyne Live 99	Released: 24 March 2015; Format: Digital download; Label: Hammerhead	—
All the Hits Live	Released: 27 November 2015; Format: CD, DD; Label: Liberation (LMCD0282)	124
Live in The Corner Hotel Front Bar	Released: 23 September 2022; Format: DD; Label: Reckless Records	—
"—" denotes releases that did not chart, or have no reliable sources of charting information.

=== Compilation albums ===
List of compilation albums, with selected details, chart positions and certifications
Title	Album details	Peak chart positions	Certifications (sales thresholds)
Title	Album details	AUS	Certifications (sales thresholds)
The Best	Released: 8 November 1992; Format: LP, cassette; Label: Virgin, EMI, Capitol (7807582)	16	ARIA: Gold
Reckless: 1979–1995	Released: 26 May 2000; Format: LP, cassette; Label: Raven	—	
The Definitive Collection	Released: 14 October 2002; Format: CD, cassette; Label: EMI Music	—	
The Essential James Reyne	Released: 2008; Format: CD, digital download; Label: EMI Music	—	
The Anthology	Released: 1 August 2014; Format: CD, digital download; Label: Universal Music Australia (5353276)	103	
"—" denotes releases that did not chart, or have no reliable sources of charting information.

== Extended plays ==
List of extended plays, with selected details and chart positions
Title	EP details	Peak chart positions
Title	EP details	AUS
James Reyne and the Magnificent Few	Released: 3 July 2015; Format: Digital download; Label: Hammerhead (HHR6CD)	78

== Singles ==
Year	Single	Chart positions		Album
Year	Single	AUS	NZ	Album
1985	"R.O.C.K." (with Lin Buckfield)	44	—	
1987	"Fall of Rome"	5	33	James Reyne
1987	"Hammerhead"	8	—	James Reyne
1987	"Rip It Up"	34	—	James Reyne
1988	"Heaven on a Stick"	59	—	James Reyne
1988	"Motor's Too Fast"	6	26	James Reyne
1988	"Always the Way"	94	—	James Reyne
1989	"House of Cards"	17	—	Hard Reyne
1989	"One More River"	22	—	Hard Reyne
1989	"Trouble in Paradise"	75	—	Hard Reyne
1990	"Harvest Moon"	122	—	Hard Reyne
1991	"Slave"	10	—	Electric Digger Dandy
1991	"Any Day Above Ground"	67	—	Electric Digger Dandy
1991	"Some People"	97	—	Electric Digger Dandy
1992	"Way Out West" (with James Blundell)	2	—	The Best
1994	"Red Light Avenue"	32	—	The Whiff of Bedlam
1995	"Day in the Sun"	86	—	The Whiff of Bedlam
1995	"It's Only Natural"	146	—	The Whiff of Bedlam
1996	"Oh No Not You Again" (live edit)	145	—	Live in Rio
1997	"Brand New Emperor's Clothes"	170	—	
1998	"Not Waving, Drowning"	132	—	Design for Living
1998	"Wonderful Today"	190	—	Design for Living
2004	"Bug"	—	—	Speedboats for Breakfast
2004	"The Rainbow's Dead End"	—	—	Speedboats for Breakfast
2005	"She Don't Like That" (with Smash 'n' Grab) (remix of "Reckless")	42	—	
2007	"Light in the Tunnel"	—	—	Every Man a King
2007	"Little Man You've Had a Busy Day"	—	—	Every Man a King
2007	"Mr. International"	—	—	Every Man a King
2011	"English Girls"	—	—	Thirteen
2012	"Capsize"	—	—	Thirteen
2012	"Whatcha Gonna Do About It?"	—	—	Thirteen
2012	"Good Clean Fun"	—	—	Thirteen
2019	"Fearless"	—	—	Palm Beach: Original Motion Picture Soundtrack
2020	"Toon Town Lullaby"	—	—	Toon Town Lullaby
2023	"Way Out West" (with Ella Hooper)	—	—	TBA
2025	"Going Back to Nashville"	—	—	TBA

== See also ==
- Australian Crawl
- Australian Crawl discography
- Company of Strangers (group)
