= The Anthology (James Reyne album) =

Compilation album by James Reyne
- Released: 1 August 2014
- Genre: Rock
- Label: Universal Music Australia

James Reyne albums chronology
Thirteen (2012)	The Anthology (2014)	Live 99 (2015)

The Anthology is a double CD greatest hits album of by Australian singer songwriter James Reyne. The album includes tracks from the last three decades. Reyne said "I've been working as a singer, musician and songwriter for a while now, and feel that it may only be that I've started to grasp how it all works relatively recently. I know I'm a better craftsman now than I was, so welcomed the idea of this Anthology/retrospective of my solo stuff. The first CD includes all the solo "hits" that I've had, but most importantly to me, provides a threshold to the later and more recent songs; tunes that many would never have heard. They are culled from the albums The Whiff of Bedlam, Design for Living, Speedboats for Breakfast, Every Man a King, and Thirteen and I hope, provide an insight into what I've really been up to."

Reyne performed a series of live acoustic shows to showcase ‘'The Anthology'’, in New South Wales, Queensland and Victoria.

== Track listing ==
CD1

No.	Title	Writer(s)	Album	Length
1.	"Fall of Rome"	James Reyne	James Reyne	4:59
2.	"Hammerhead"	Reyne; Simon Hussey	James Reyne	4:46
3.	"Motor's Too Fast"	Reyne; Hussey	James Reyne	4:14
4.	"Always the Way"	Reyne; Hussey	James Reyne	7:23
5.	"One More River"	Reyne	Hard Reyne	3:58
6.	"House of Cards"	John Hiatt	Hard Reyne	4:17
7.	"Harvest Moon"	Reyne; Hussey	Hard Reyne	4:12
8.	"Five Miles Closer to the Sun"	Reyne; Hussey	Hard Reyne	4:39
9.	"Wake Up Deadman"	Reyne; Hussey	Hard Reyne	3:43
10.	"Slave"	Reyne; Jim Vallance	Electric Digger Dandy	4:13
11.	"Any Day Above Ground"	Reyne	Electric Digger Dandy	3:38
12.	"Outback Woman"	Reyne; Tony Joe White	Electric Digger Dandy	3:38
13.	"Water Water"	Reyne	Electric Digger Dandy	5:40
14.	"Some People"	Reyne; Vallace	Electric Digger Dandy	4:11
15.	"Take a Giant Step"	Reyne; Hussey	Electric Digger Dandy	5:01
16.	"Way Out West" (with James Blundell)	The Dingoes	The Best	4:00
17.	"Motor City (I Get Lost)" (by Company of Strangers)	J Scott; Hussey	Company of Strangers	4:41

CD2

No.	Title	Writer(s)	Album	Length
1.	"Red Light Avenue"	Wayne Burt; Stewart Levine	The Whiff of Bedlam	4:28
2.	"Day in the Sun"	Reyne	The Whiff of Bedlam	5:47
3.	"It's Only Natural"	Reyne; Hussey	The Whiff of Bedlam	4:43
4.	"Poor Man in the Penthouse"	Reyne; Neil Larson	The Whiff of Bedlam	5:32
5.	"Design for Living"	Reyne; Flanders and Swan	Design for Living	3:28
6.	"I Don’t Get Out Much Anymore"	Reyne	Design for Living	4:50
7.	"Little Criminals"	Reyne	Design for Living	4:21
8.	"Reno"	Reyne; J. Kimball; G. Hutchinson	Design for Living	5:10
9.	"Nothin’s Too Good for My Baby"	Reyne	Design for Living	4:21
10.	"Reckless" (acoustic)	Reyne	And the Horse You Rode in On	3:04
11.	"Bug"		Speedboats for Breakfast	4:02
12.	"The Rainbow's Dead End"		Speedboats for Breakfast	4:30
13.	"Sammy and Doofus and Our Man in New York"	Reyne; Scott Kingman	Every Man a King	3:27
14.	"Superannuated Idol"	Reyne	Every Man a King	2:27
15.	"Stop Draggin' My Name Around"	Reyne	Every Man a King	4:20
16.	"English Girls"		Thirteen	3:32
17.	"Capsize"		Thirteen	4:21
18.	"Good Clean Fun"		Thirteen	5:02

== Charts ==
Chart performance for The Anthology
Chart (2014)	Peak position
Australian Albums (ARIA)	103

== Release history ==
Country	Date	Format	Label	Catalogue
Australia	1 August 2014	CD, digital download	Universal Music Australia	5353276
