= James Blundell discography =

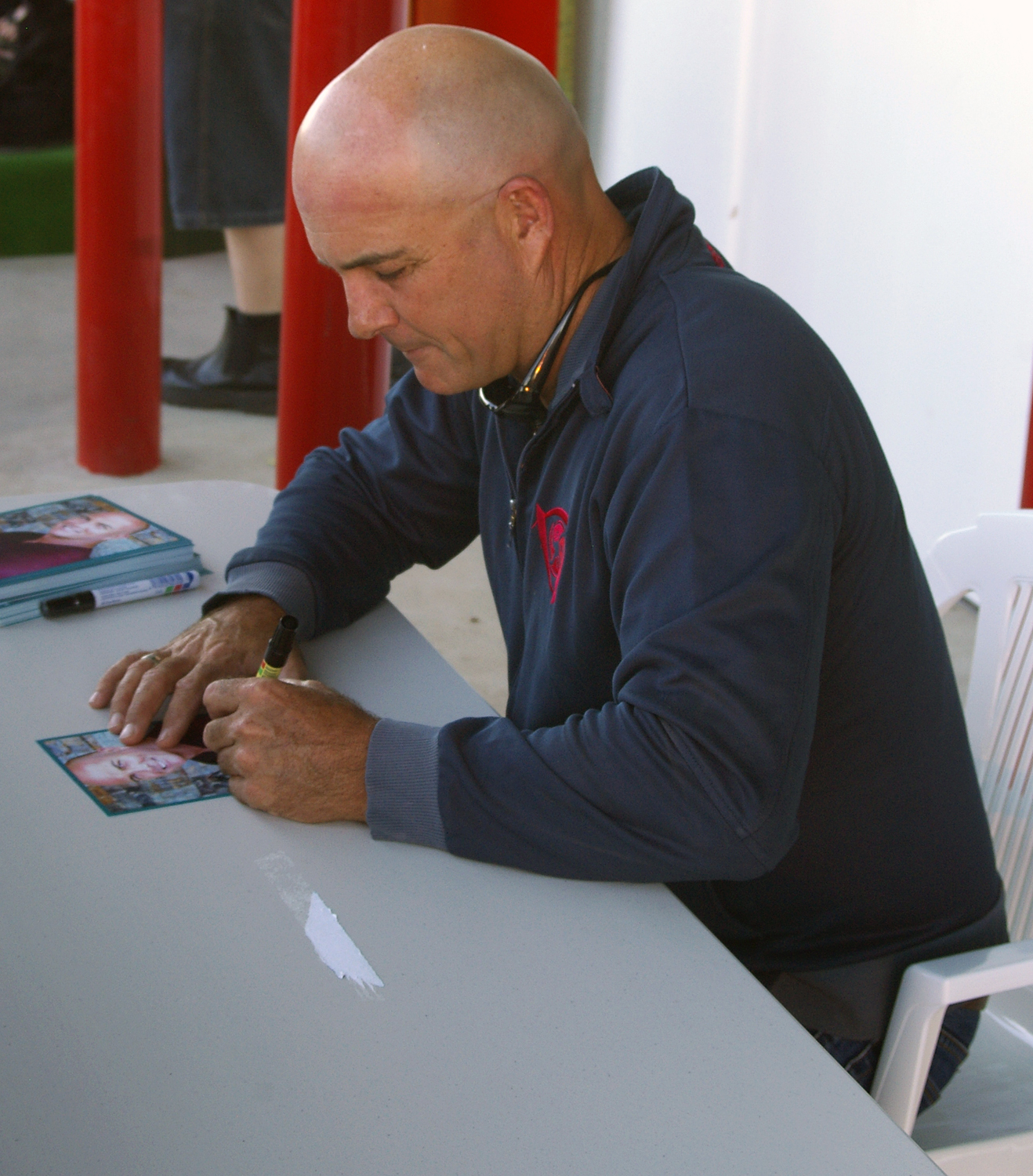
- James Blundell
- Studio albums: 14
- Compilation albums: 2
- Tribute albums: 1

Australian singer James Blundell has released fourteen studio albums and two compilation albums. As of 2010, his albums have sold more than 400,000 copies.

== Studio albums ==
List of albums, with selected chart positions and certifications
Title	Album details	Peak chart positions	Certification
Title	Album details	AUS	Certification
James Blundell	Released: March 1989; Format: LP, cassette; Label: EMI (791816)	68	
Hand It Down	Released: July 1990; Format: LP, CD, cassette; Label: EMI (794791)	50	
This Road	Released: April 1992; Format: LP, CD, cassette; Label: EMI (799329)	4	ARIA: Platinum
Touch of Water	Released: August 1993; Format: CD, cassette; Label: EMI (827122)	11	
Earth & Sea	Released: April 1995; Format: CD, cassette; Label: EMI (833378)	31	
Amsterdam Breakfast	Released: April 1999; Format: CD, cassette; Label: EMI (7243 520129 2 3)	168	
Deluge	Released: May 2005; Format: CD, digital download; Label: Revenge (REVR001)	—	
Ring Around the Moon	Released: 2 April 2007; Format: CD, digital; Label: Compass Brothers (034 CDCB)	138	
Portrait of a Man	Released: late 2008; Format: CD, digital; Label: Compass Brothers (058 CDCB)	229	
Woolshed Creek	Released: 2 April 2011; Format: CD, digital; Label: Revenge (REVR12011)	—	
Come On In	Released: 21 August 2015; Format: CD, digital; Label: Red Rebel Music (RRM020)	—	
Campfire	Released: 3 February 2017; Format: CD, digital; Label: Red Rebel Music / Revenge	58	
World Don't Stop	Released: 2024; Format: digital; Label: James Blundell	—	
Patience Wins	Released: 7 November 2025; Format: CD, digital; Label: James Blundell	25	
"—" denotes releases that did not chart, or have no reliable sources of charting information.

== Compilation albums ==
List of compilation albums, with selected chart positions and certifications
Title	Album details	Peak chart positions
Title	Album details	AUS
I Shall Be Released: The Best of James Blundell	Released: 27 August 2001; Format: CD; Label: EMI (535324 2)	157
Essential	Released: 2007; Format: CD, digital; Label: EMI	—

== Tribute albums ==
List of tribute albums
Title	Album details
30 Years of Pride: A Tribute to James Blundell	Released: 23 February 2018; Format: CD, DD, streaming; Label: Red Rebel Music (RRM027)

== Charting singles ==
List of singles to peak within the ARIA top 200
Year	Title	Peak chart positions	Album
Year	Title	AUS	Album
1990	"The Blue Heeler"	127	Hand It Down
1992	Way Out West" (with James Reyne)	2	This Road
1992	"This Road"	26	This Road
1992	"Down On the Farm"	95	This Road
1993	"Mysterious Ways"	84	Touch of Water
1995	"Pride"	122	Earth & Sea
1995	"Guardian Angel"	168	Earth & Sea
2005	"Postcards from Saigon"	82	Deluge
