= The Essential James Reyne =

The Essential

Greatest hits album by James Reyne
- Released: 2008
- Recorded: 1986–1992
- Genre: Rock, pop, folk
- Label: EMI Music

James Reyne albums chronology
One Night in Melbourne (2007)	The Essential (2008)	TCB (2010)

The Essential is a budget greatest hits album by Australian singer-songwriter, James Reyne. The album was released in 2008 and tracks are taken from the albums, James Reyne, Hard Reyne, Electric Digger Dandy. There are five top 20 singles on the album.

== Track listing ==
CD/ Cassette (EMI 50999 243070 2 4)

1. "Hammerhead" - 4:46
2. "Motor's Too Fast" - 4:20
3. "One More River" - 4:01
4. "Fall of Rome" - 4:57
5. "Slave" - 4:13
6. "Any Day Above Ground" - 3:38
7. "Heaven on a Stick" - 3:24
8. "Some People" - 4:14
9. "Mr. Sandman" - 4:24
10. "Way Out West" (with James Blundell) - 3:59
11. "Rip it Up" - 5:42
12. "Always the Way" - 7:23
