= The Best (James Reyne album) =

Greatest hits album by James Reyne
- Released: 8 November 1992
- Genre: Rock, pop
- Length: 68:17
- Label: Virgin Records, EMI Music, Capitol Records
- Producer: Davitt Sigerson, James Reyne, John Hudson, Simon Hussey, Tony Joe White

James Reyne albums chronology
Electric Digger Dandy (1991)	The Best (1992)	The Whiff of Bedlam (1994)

Singles from The Best
- 1. "Way Out West" Released: March 1992

Professional ratings
Review scores
Source	Rating
Allmusic	3/5 stars

The Best is the first greatest hits album by Australian singer-songwriter, James Reyne. The album peaked at number 16 on the ARIA Charts. It includes the track "Way Out West" with James Blundell which peaked at number 2 in April 1992.

In October 2025, the album was released on vinyl for the first time.

== Track listing ==
CD/ Cassette (Virgin/ EMI/ Capitol Records – 7807582)

1. "Fall of Rome" - 4:57
2. "Hammerhead" - 4:46
3. "Rip it Up" - 5:42
4. "Motor's Too Fast" - 4:20
5. "Outback Woman" - 3:38
6. "One More River" - 4:01
7. "Stood Up" - 4:54
8. "Slave" - 4:13
9. "Any Day Above Ground" - 3:38
10. "Some People" - 4:14
11. "Wake Up Deadman" - 3:43
12. "Way Out West" (with James Blundell) - 3:59
13. "Reckless" - 5:19
14. "Heaven on a Stick" - 3:24
15. "Always the Way" - 7:23
- tracks 1–4, 14-15 taken from the album James Reyne
- tracks 6, 11 taken from the album Hard Reyne
- tracks 5, 7–10, 13 taken from the album Electric Digger Dandy

== Charts ==
=== Weekly charts ===
Chart (1992–93)	Peak position
Australian Albums (ARIA)	16

=== Year-end charts ===
Chart (1992)	Peak position
Australian Albums (ARIA)	67

== Certifications ==
Region	Certification	Certified units/sales
Australia (ARIA)	Gold	35,000^{^}
^{^} Shipments figures based on certification alone.
