= Ghost Ships (album) =

- Australian album cover

Studio album by James Reyne
- Released: September 29, 2007
- Recorded: March, April, May 2007
- Studio: Hobby Horse Studios, East Malvern
- Genre: Rock, pop, acoustic
- Length: 63:39
- Label: Liberation
- Producer: James Reyne, Scott Kingman

James Reyne chronology
Every Man a King (2007)	Ghost Ships (2007)	One Night in Melbourne (2007)

Professional ratings
Review scores
Source	Rating
AllMusic	4/5 stars

Ghost Ships is the ninth solo studio album by Australian singer-songwriter James Reyne released on 29 September 2007. The album is an acoustic recording of songs from his solo career and Australian Crawl and Company of Strangers songs.

It is the second album of acoustic recordings following the 2005 release of And the Horse You Rode in On. Later digital editions renamed this album Greatest Hits Acoustic 2.

== Background ==
During the time of the release of Every Man a King, Reyne reconnected with long time collaborator Scott Kingman to re-record more of his earlier work in an acoustic style. He said he was surprised at the success of the And the Horse You Rode in On album and “it makes sense to continue in that vein."

When discussing the tracks from his albums Design for Living and Speedboats for Breakfast, Reyne said, "I still love the originals and in my heart of hearts I felt a little disappointed those albums were overlooked to some extent, so here's another chance for people to hear them. It might turn them on to the original versions".

== Review ==
Tomas Mureika of All Music said "Volume 2 of James Reyne's acoustic reimaginings of his back catalog is even more satisfying than the first, The song choices are braver and the arrangements are tighter.” Concluding with “this serves as a nice complement to his greatest-hits collection and -- with the combination of singles and rarities that make up this record -- it plays as a great Reyne album all on its own. Proof that an artist can rework their material and still come up with something fresh and new."

== Track listing ==
CD

1. "Beautiful People" - 3:04
2. "Bug" - 4:37
3. "Way Out West" - 2:55
4. "Burning Wood" - 3:31
5. "Always the Way" - 6:01
6. "Little Criminals" - 4:12
7. "The Rainbow's Dead End" - 4:31
8. "The Boys Light Up" - 4:38
9. "Daddy's Gonna Make You a Star" - 4:05
10. "I Don't Get Out Much Anymore" - 4:36
11. "Goin' Fishin'" - 4:10
12. "Fall of Rome" - 4:18
13. "Motor's Too Fast" - 3:49
14. "Red Light Avenue" - 4:03
15. "Water Water" - 5:09

== Credits ==
- Bass, Mandolin – Scott Kingman
- Guitar, Slide Guitar, Drums, Percussion – James Reyne, Scott Kingman
- Keyboards, Harmonica, Vocals – James Reyne

== Charts ==
Chart performance for Ghost Ships
Chart (2007)	Peak position
Australian Albums (ARIA)	101

== Release history ==
Region	Date	Format(s)	Label	Catalogue
Australia	29 September 2007	Compact Disc, Music download	Liberation Records	BLUE1552
