= All the Hits Live (album) =

Live album by James Reyne
- Released: 27 November 2015
- Recorded: Astor Theatre, Perth; 5 September 2015
- Genre: Rock, Australian rock
- Label: Liberation Music

James Reyne chronology
James Reyne and the Magnificent Few (2015)	All the Hits Live (2015)

All the Hits Live is a live album by Australian singer songwriter James Reyne. The album was recorded live in Astor Theatre, Perth on 5 September 2015. The band consisted of Brett Kingman and Phil Ceberano on guitar, Andy McIvor on bass, and former Australian Crawl member John Watson on drums.

Reyne said, "Such a time was had by all, we figured we'd be foolish not to commit it to tape. So herewith the results, recorded one hot September night way out west." The album was announced on 4 November and released on 27 November 2015. Reyne toured with Moving Pictures throughout Australia from October 2015 – February 2016, further promoting the album

== Reception ==
Professional ratings
Review scores
Source	Rating
Renowned for Sound	3.5/5 stars

Lucy Barber-Hancock from Renowned for Sound said: "It's a powerful recording which emphasise's Reyne's sheer talent not only as a vocalist, but as an entertainer." adding "The album is expertly arranged, with a clear sense of rise and fall throughout." Barber-Hancock was critical of "his banter with the audience [which at times] veers into self-indulgence".

== Track listing ==
1. "Daughters of the Northern Coast" (Guy McDonough / James Reyne) – 5:04
2. "Beautiful People" (Mark Hudson / James Reyne) – 3:51
3. "Indisposed" (Bill McDonough / James Reyne / Brad Robinson / James Robinson) – 3:36
4. "Lakeside" (James Reyne) – 5:52
5. "Way Out West" (Michael Bois / John Lee / Broderick Smith / Chris Stockley / Kerryn Tolhurst) – 3:31
6. "Motor's Too Fast" (Simon Hussey / James Reyne) – 4:31
7. "Slave" (James Reyne / James Valance / Jim Vallance) – 4:59
8. "Downhearted" (Sean Higgins / Bill McDonough / Guy McDonough) – 3:33
9. "Reckless" (James Reyne) – 6:57
10. "Hammerhead" (Simon Hussey / James Reyne) – 5:07
11. "Sweet Love" (Simon Hussey / Jeff Scott) – 6:03
12. "Hoochie Gucci Fiorucci Mama" (David Briggs / James Reyne) – 3:19

CD2

1. "Always the Way" (Simon Hussey / James Reyne) – 6:30
2. "La Califusa" (James Reyne) – 4:21
3. "One More River" (James Reyne) – 5:57
4. "Unpublished Critics" (James Reyne / Paul Williams / Paul Williams) – 6:20
5. "Errol" (Guy McDonough / James Reyne) – 5:54
6. "Oh No Not You Again" (Guy McDonough) – 5:05
7. "Fall Of Rome" (James Reyne) – 4:57
8. "Things Don't Seem" (Sean Higgins / Guy McDonough) – 6:05
9. "The Boys Light Up" (James Reyne) – 5:05

== Charts ==
Chart performance for All the Hits Live
Chart (2015)	Peak position
Australian Albums (ARIA)	124
Australia Independent Chart (AIR)	20

== Release history ==
Country	Date	Format	Label	Catalogue
Australia	27 November 2015	CD, digital download	Liberation Music	LMCD0282
