= One Night in Melbourne =

Live album by James Reyne
- Released: December 2007
- Recorded: Esplanade Hotel (Melbourne); September 2007
- Genre: Rock, Australian rock
- Label: Liberation Music

James Reyne chronology
Ghost Ships (2007)	One Night in Melbourne (2007)	The Essential James Reyne (2008)

One Night in Melbourne is a live album by Australian singer songwriter James Reyne. The album was recorded live in Esplanade Hotel (Melbourne) on 5 September 2007, during the promotion of the Ghost Ships album and released as a CD/DVD set.

== Track listing ==
CD

1. "Fall Of Rome" - 5:24
2. "Slave" - 4:08
3. "Hammerhead" - 4:08
4. "Reckless" - 3:15
5. "Reno" - 3:26
6. "Sammy and Doofus and Our Man In New York" - 3:11
7. "Little Criminals" - 4:13
8. "Little Man You've Had a Busy Day" - 4:01
9. "Mr Froggy Went a Courtin'" - 2:57
10. "Broken Romeo" - 2:47
11. "Motor's Too Fast" - 3:42
12. "Water Water" - 4:33
13. "Superannuated Idol" - 2:11
14. "Political Science" - 1:52
15. "Harvest Moon" - 4:25
16. "The Rainbow's Dead End" - 4:18
17. "Errol" - 3:49
18. "Oh No Not You Again" - 5:20
19. "The Boys Light Up" - 3:58

DVD

1. "Fall Of Rome"
2. "Slave"
3. "Mr International"
4. "Hammerhead"
5. "Light In The Tunnel"
6. "Beautiful People"
7. "Reckless"
8. "Reno"
9. "Sammy and Doofus and Our Man In New York"
10. "Little Criminals"
11. "One More River"
12. "Little Man You've Had a Busy Day"
13. "How To Make Gravy"
14. "Way Out West"
15. "The Postman"
16. "Mr Froggy Went a Courtin'"
17. "Broken Romeo"
18. "Motor's Too Fast"
19. "I'm a Man"
20. "Water Water"
21. "Motor City"
22. "Superannuated Idol"
23. "Political Science"
24. "Downhearted"
25. "Harvest Moon"
26. "The Rainbow's Dead End"
27. "Errol"
28. "Oh No Not You Again"
29. "The Boy's Light Up"
30. "Daughters Of The Northern Coast"
- Bonus Feature: Exclusive Interview

== Release history ==
Country	Date	Format	Label	Catalogue
Australia	December 2007	CD/ DVD	Liberation Music	LIBDVD1084 / LMCD0063

== Credits ==
- Bass – Rexx Fernandez
- Drums – John Watson
- Guitar, Vocals – Brett Kingman
- Vocals – Tracy Kingman
