= Live in Rio (James Reyne album) =

Live album by James Reyne
- Released: April 1996
- Recorded: Circo Voador in Rio de Janeiro, Brazil; May 1995
- Genre: Rock, Australian rock
- Label: rooArt
- Producer: Marcello Tobobo, Robert Binder

James Reyne chronology
The Whiff of Bedlam (1994)	Live in Rio (1996)	Design for Living (1999)

Professional ratings
Review scores
Source	Rating
Allmusic	4/5 stars

Live in Rio is a 2-disc live album by Australian singer songwriter James Reyne. The album was recorded live in Circo Voador, Rio de Janeiro, Brazil in May 1995.

== Review ==
Tomas Mureika of All Music said "Presenting the master playing at the top of his game, this two-CD live hits set includes tracks from James Reyne's Australian Crawl days as well as from his lucrative solo career. He fronts a tight band and does a dynamic job capturing the feel of one of his live shows. Most surprising are the standout tracks "Harvest Moon" "Slave" and "Winds of Change"... which really carry a punch live." adding "All in all an impressive live album from one of Australia's greatest superstars".

== Track listing ==
CD1

1. "Things Don't Seem" (Guy McDonough, Sean Higgins)
2. "Lakeside" (Reyne)
3. "Harvest Moon" (Reyne, Simon Hussey)
4. "Slave" (Reyne, Jim Vallance)
5. "Five Miles Closer To The Sun" (Reyne, Hussey)
6. "Winds Of Change" (Brett Goldsmith, Reyne)
7. "Hammerhead" (Reyne, Hussey)
8. "Daughters Of The Northern Coast" (McDonough, Reyne)
9. "One More River" (Reyne)

CD2

1. "Unpublished Critics" (Reyne, Williams)
2. "Motor's Too Fast" (Reyne, Hussey)
3. "Some People" (Reyne, Vallance)
4. "Oh No Not You Again" (McDonough)
5. "The Traveller" (Davitt Sigerson, Reyne, Scott)
6. "Errol" (McDonough, Reyne)
7. "Reckless" (Reyne)
8. "Day In The Sun" (Reyne)
9. "The Boys Light Up" (Reyne)

== Credits ==
- Bass, Backing Vocals – Ron Francois
- Drums – John Watson
- Guitar, Backing Vocals – Michael King
- Keyboards, Backing Vocals – Mark O'Connor
- Keyboards, Guitar, Backing Vocals – Andrew Bett
- Vocals, Guitar – James Reyne

== Charts ==
Chart performance for Live in Rio
Chart (1996)	Peak position
Australian Albums (ARIA)	65

== Release history ==
Country	Date	Format	Label	Catalogue
Australia	April 1996	CD, digital download	rooArt	74321444072
