= James Blundell =

James Blundell may refer to:

- James Blundell (physician) (1790–1878), English obstetrician
- James Blundell (singer) (born 1964), Australian country music singer
  - James Blundell (album), 1989
