= And the Horse You Rode in On =

- Australian album cover

Studio album by James Reyne
- Released: 14 March 2005
- Recorded: Spring 2004
- Studio: Hobby Horse Studios, St Kilda East
- Genre: Rock; pop; acoustic
- Label: Liberation
- Producer: James Reyne, Scott Kingman

James Reyne chronology
Speedboats for Breakfast (2004)	And the Horse You Rode in On (2005)	Every Man a King (2007)

Professional ratings
Review scores
Source	Rating
AllMusic	3.5/5 stars

And the Horse You Rode in On is the seventh solo studio album by Australian singer/songwriter James Reyne released on 14 March 2005. It's an acoustic recording of songs taken from his earlier solo work and Australian Crawl songs. It includes two new tracks. Later digital editions renamed this album as Greatest Hits Acoustic.

== Review ==
Tomas Mureika of AllMusic said "The songs are produced in such a way as to spotlight [Reyne's] inimitable voice. Most of the songs are done strictly acoustically, with just Reyne and a guitar, although some are given different arrangements ("One More River" has been given an almost reggae beat, while "Any Day Above Ground" has an ironically funereal dirge about it). There are a couple of new tracks, "The Euphonious Whale" and "How to Make Gravy". This fascinating reimagining of a fantastic catalog of songs nicely reconnects with an artist who had entered the new century with the aggressiveness of Speedboats for Breakfast. Not your typical 'hits' record, And the Horse You Rode in On is all the more entertaining for it."

== Track listing ==
1. "Errol" (Guy McDonough, J. Reyne)
2. "To Live's to Fly" (Townes Van Zandt)
3. "One More River" (Reyne)
4. "The Euphonious Whale" (featuring Daryl Braithwaite and Evie Von Bibra) (Dan Hicks)
5. "Reckless" (Reyne)
6. "How to Make Gravy" (Paul Kelly)
7. "Oh No Not You Again" (McDonough)
8. "Any Day Above Ground" (Reyne)
9. "Mr Froggy Went a 'Courtin'" (traditional)
10. "Slave" (Reyne, Jim Vallance)
11. "Reno" (George Hutchinson, Reyne, Jennifer Kimball)
12. "Hammerhead" (Reyne, Simon Hussey)
13. "Stood Up" (John Hiatt)
14. "Downhearted" (Bill McDonough, G.McDonough, Sean Higgins)
15. "Stranger Than Fiction" (Reyne)
16. "April Sun in Cuba" (with Mark Seymour) (Marc Hunter, Paul Hewson) (bonus track on reissued versions of the album)

== Credits ==
- James Reyne – vocals, guitar, keyboards, drums
- Brett Kingman – guitar
- Scott Kingman – guitar
- Chris Hawker – guitar

== Charts ==
Chart performance for And the Horse You Rode in On
Chart (2005)	Peak position
Australian Albums (ARIA)	86

== Release history ==
Release history and formats for And the Horse You Rode in On
Region	Date	Format(s)	Label	Catalogue
Australia	14 March 2005	CD, Music download	Liberation	BLUE076.5
