= I Shall Be Released: The Best of James Blundell =

Greatest hits album by James Blundell
- Released: 27 August 2001
- Genre: Country; Pop rock; rock
- Length: 77:37
- Label: EMI

James Blundell chronology
Amsterdam Breakfast (1999)	I Shall Be Released: The Best of James Blundell (2001)	Deluge (2005)

Singles from I Shall Be Released: The Best of James Blundell
- 1. "The Valley " Released: August 2001; 2. "I Shall Be Released" Released: 2001

I Shall Be Released: The Best of James Blundell is the first greatest hits album by Australian recording artist James Blundell, released in August 2001 by EMI; ending his contract with the label. The album has 20 of Blundell's hits and best tracks from the last decade plus 4 brand new tracks "The Valley", "A Moment in Time", "Come Back Soon" and "I Shall Be Released".

== Reception ==
Ron Adsett from Capital News said "If you want a taste of James, this is a great value introduction to the work on his seven other albums to date."

== Track listing ==
1. "Moment in Time" (J. Blundell) - 3:36
2. "The Old Man's Gone" (J. Blundell) - 3:12
3. "Age of Grace" (J. Blundell) - 3:34
4. "Walk On" (G. Barnhill/J. Blundell/V. Melamed) - 3:24
5. "Time On His Hands" (J. Blundell/D. McCumpstie/Garth Porter) - 3:44
6. "Down on the Farm" (J. Blundell/ Billy Dean) - 3:57
7. "Pride" (C. Bailey/J. Blundell) - 4:42
8. "Very Good Song" (J. Blundell/M. King) - 3:54
9. "Mysterious Ways" (J. Blundell/R. Kennedy) - 3:45
10. "Touch of Water" (J. Blundell) - 4:37
11. "Rain on a Tin Roof" (J. Blundell) - 5:04
12. "Kimberely Moon" (J. Blundell/D. Trevor) - 3:44
13. "Cloncurry Cattle Song" (J. Blundell/M. Hickson) - 3:24
14. "Come Back Soon" (J. Blundell) - 2:26
15. "Guardian Angels" (J. Blundell) - 4:40
16. "The Valley" (J. Blundell) - 3:28
17. "Way Out West" (with James Reyne) (The Dingoes) - 4:02
18. "Blue Heeler" (J. Blundell) - 4:16
19. "This Road" (J. Blundell) - 3:47
20. "I Shall Be Released" (Bob Dylan) - 4:21

== Charts ==
Chart (2001)	Peak position
Australian Albums (ARIA)	157
Australian Country Albums (ARIA Charts)	7

== Release history ==
Region	Date	Format	Edition(s)	Label	Catalogue
Australia	27 August 2001	CD	Standard	EMI	5353242
Australia	1 October 2001	Cassette	Standard	EMI	5353244
