= James Reyne Live 99 =

Live 99

Live album by James Reyne
- Released: 24 March 2015
- Recorded: 1991
- Genres: Rock, Australian rock
- Length: 44:24
- Label: Hammerhead Records

James Reyne chronology
The Anthology (2014)	Live 99 (2015)	James Reyne and the Magnificent Few (2015)

Live 99 is a live album by Australian singer songwriter James Reyne. The album was originally included as a bonus disc on the limited edition of the Design for Living album in 1999. Following Reyne receiving the Medal of the Order of Australia (OAM) in 2014, the album was re-issued as a separate album.

Reyne toured the album throughout Victoria, Australia in April 2014.

== Track listing ==
DD

No.	Title	Length
1.	"Fall of Rome"	5:26
2.	"Ferris Wheel"	3:51
3.	"Harvest Moon"	4:20
4.	"Take a Giant Step"	4:59
5.	"Land of Hope and Glory"	4:08
6.	"Any Day Above Ground"	3:28
7.	"Heaven on a Stick"	4:22
8.	"Slave"	3:52
9.	"Some People"	4:53
10.	"Water Water"	5:05

== Release history ==
Country	Date	Format	Label	References
Worldwide	24 March 2015	digital download	Hammerhead Records	
