= This Road =

This Road may refer to:

- This Road (album), a 1992 album by James Blundell
  - "This Road" (James Blundell song), a song by James Blundell from his 1992 album, This Road
- "This Road" (Jars of Clay song), a song by Jars of Clay from their 2000 album, City on a Hill: Songs of Worship and Praise
- "This Road", a song by Ane Brun and Lars Bygdén from the 2005 album, Duets
