= TCB (album) =

Studio album by James Reyne
- Released: 12 April 2010
- Recorded: 2009
- Genres: Rock; pop
- Length: 38:08
- Label: Liberation
- Producer: Charles Fisher

James Reyne chronology
The Essential James Reyne (2008)	TCB (2010)	Thirteen (2012)

Professional ratings
Review scores
Source	Rating
The Sydney Morning Herald	3/5 stars

TCB (an abbreviation for "Taking Care of Business") is the tenth solo studio album by Australian singer/songwriter James Reyne. The album was released on 12 April 2010. The album debuted and peaked at number 32 in Australia. TCB is a tribute album to Reyne's idol Elvis Presley, with Reyne explaining: "Elvis and his guys – his 'inner circle', his bodyguards – they used to give each other these little key rings and badges with TCB on them and they'd say 'Yeah, we're takin' care of business'." TCB was the name of Elvis' band.

== Background and promotion ==
Reyne said choosing songs for this album meant listening to a vast catalogue of Presley tunes. He deliberately avoided the earlier/iconic songs like "Hound Dog"’, "That's All Right" and "Suspicious Minds" and avoided Elvis' gospel records. Reyne said that he wanted to do ‘Kentucky Rain’ and others from the movies "I really wanted Kentucky Rain because it's a brilliantly written song but also quite cheesy, lyrically, but there is something that appeals to me and I think that's it with a lot of the music the tongue is in the cheek."

Reyne celebrated the release of TCB album by performing two special theatre shows in May where he exclusively performed songs from this album along with other 'Elvis' material. The shows featured an 8-piece band and Reyne did not perform any of his own material at these performances. These shows took place on 21 May at Palais Theatre, St Kilda and 22 May at State Theatre, Sydney. Reyne also filmed a special for Music Max that aired in May 2010.

== Critical reception ==
Andrew Murfett of The Sydney Morning Herald gave the album three out of five stars and wrote, "Reyne's oft-maligned voice is routinely excellent; he's rarely put in a better vocal performance. He also knows better than to sing "Are You Lonesome Tonight?" too earnestly. He avoids the gospel-era Elvis, instead opting for some cheese: "Viva Las Vegas", "Return to Sender", "Girls, Girls, Girls" and "Burning Love". What could have been embarrassing is instead a playful lark" adding "It's a heap of fun."

Mark Milan of The Daily Vault gave the album a B+ and felt that "[Reyne's] voice gives so easily to the material here, and while there are no band credits in the liner notes, whoever is playing on this thing did a mighty fine job." Milan said "Are You Lonesome Tonight?" is a negative on the album and “Burning Love” just sounds generic and flat. Milan praises "Kentucky Rain", "Girls Girls Girls" and "Little Egypt" adding "Reyne has definitely Taken Care Of Business and done so with authority."

== Commercial performance ==
TCB debuted at number 32 in Australia for the week commencing 19 April 2010.

== Track listing ==
1. "Viva Las Vegas" (Doc Pomus/Mort Shuman) – 2:16
2. "Such a Night" (Lincoln Chase) – 3:05
3. "Kentucky Rain" (Dick Heard, Eddie Rabbitt) – 3:33
4. "Burning Love" (Dennis Linde) – 3:07
5. "(Marie's the Name) His Latest Flame" (Doc Pomus/Mort Shuman) – 2:36
6. "Good Luck Charm" (Aaron Schroeder/Wally Gold) – 2:50
7. "All Shook Up" (Elvis Presley/Otis Blackwell) – 2:01
8. "Bossa Nova Baby" (Jerry Leiber/Mike Stoller) – 2:29
9. "(You're the) Devil in Disguise" (Bernie Baum/Bill Giant/Florence Kaye) – 2:40
10. "She's Not You" (Doc Pomus/Jerry Leiber/Mike Stoller) – 2:11
11. "Girls, Girls, Girls" (Jerry Leiber/Mike Stoller) – 3:11
12. "Little Egypt" (Jerry Leiber/Mike Stoller) – 2:46
13. "Return to Sender" (Otis Blackwell/Winfield Scott) – 2:25
14. "Are You Lonesome Tonight?" (Lou Handman/Roy Turk) – 3:06

== Charts ==
Chart performance for TCB
Chart (2010)	Peak position
Australian Albums (ARIA)	32

== Release history ==
Release history and formats for TCB
Region	Date	Format(s)	Label	Catalogue
Australia	12 April 2010	CD, digital download	Liberation	LMCD0094
