= This Road (album) =

Studio album by James Blundell
- Released: 3 April 1992
- Studio: Metropolis, Studios 301 (Sydney, Australia)
- Genre: Country
- Length: 53:26
- Label: EMI
- Producer: Garth Porter; James Reyne

James Blundell chronology
Hand It Down (1990)	This Road (1992)	Touch of Water (1993)

Singles from This Road
- 1. "Way Out West" Released: March 1992; 2. "This Road" Released: 1 June 1992; 3. "Down on the Farm" Released: 10 August 1992

This Road is the third studio album by Australian country musician James Blundell, which was released in April 1992 by EMI. The album debuted at number four on the ARIA Albums Chart and became Blundell's highest-charting album. It was certified platinum by the Australian Recording Industry Association for shipments of more than 70,000 copies. This Road provided three singles, a duet with James Reyne for their cover version of "Way Out West" (March 1992), the title track (June) and "Down on the Farm" (August).

At the 1993 ARIA Music Awards, This Road was nominated for Best Country Album. At the 1993 Country Music Awards, it won Top Selling album of the Year.

== Background ==
Australian country musician James Blundell recorded his third studio album, This Road in 1991. Before it appeared he issued a duet single, with James Reyne, covering the Dingoes' song "Way Out West" in March 1992. It peaked at No. 2 on the ARIA Singles chart in April. He reflected on its impact on his career, "I had six or seven years hard work before then. Now the venues are gradually getting bigger and the audience is broadening." The album was released on 3 April via EMI, which was co-produced by Reyne with Garth Porter. It reached No. 4 on the ARIA charts. It was certified platinum by the Australian Recording Industry Association (ARIA) for shipments of more than 70,000 copies by the end of that year. Two further singles appeared from the album, "This Road" (June) and "Down on the Farm" (August). The latter is an ode to Rebecca Williams, whom he had met when he was 16 (c. 1980) and in 2020 they became engaged.

== Track listing ==
All tracks are written by James Blundell, unless otherwise indicated

This Road (1992) – EMI (7993292)
No.	Title	Length
1.	"This Road"	3:47
2.	"Down on the Farm" (Blundell, Billy Dean)	3:56
3.	"Young John Taylor"	3:27
4.	"The Old Man's Gone"	3:10
5.	"Hard Times" / "Way Out West" (Blundell / John Lee, Broderick Smith, John Bois, Kerryn Tolhurst, Chris Stockley)	7:29
6.	"I Don't Fight Anymore"	4:11
7.	"Rain on a Tin Roof"	5:03
8.	"All That I Need"	4:01
9.	"She Won't Let You Down" (Blundell, Lawrie Minson)	4:05
10.	"Cabin Fever"	3:44
11.	"Strokin'"	3:38
12.	"Older Now"	6:55
Total length:		53:26

== Charts ==
=== Weekly charts ===
Chart (1992)	Peak position
Australian Albums (ARIA)	4

=== Year-end charts ===
Chart (1992)	Rank
Australian Albums Chart	28
Australian Artist Albums Chart	7

== Certifications ==
Region	Certification	Certified units/sales
Australia (ARIA)	Platinum	70,000^{^}
^{^} Shipments figures based on certification alone.

== Release history ==
Region	Date	Format	Edition(s)	Label	Catalogue
Australia	April 1992	CD; cassette	Standard	EMI	799329
Australia	16 August 2008	CD	Re-release	EMI	055CDCB
