= This Road (James Blundell song) =

Single by James Blundell

from the album This Road
- B-side: "All That I Need"; "The Old Man's Gone"
- Released: 1 June 1992
- Studio: Studios 301
- Length: 3:48
- Label: EMI
- Songwriter(s): James Blundell
- Producer(s): Garth Porter

James Blundell singles chronology
"Way Out West" (1992)	"This Road" (1992)	"Down on the Farm" (1992)

"This Road" is a song written and recorded by Australian country singer James Blundell. The song was released on 1 June 1992 as the second single from his third studio album, This Road (1992). The song peaked at number 26, becoming Blundell's second top-30 single in Australia.

== Track listing ==
CD single

1. "This Road" – 3:48
2. "All That I Need" – 4:02
3. "The Old Man's Gone" – 3:13

== Weekly charts ==
Chart (1992)	Peak position
Australia (ARIA)	26
