= Design for Living (album) =

- Australian album cover

Studio album by James Reyne
- Released: 23 February 1999
- Recorded: 1998
- Genre: Rock, pop, experimental
- Label: Village Roadshow, Liberation Records
- Producer: James Reyne, Ashley Cadell, Michael Letho

James Reyne chronology
Live in Rio (1996)	Design for Living (1999)	Reckless: 1979–1995 (2000)

Professional ratings
Review scores
Source	Rating
Allmusic	3/5 stars

Design for Living is the fifth solo studio album by Australian singer/songwriter James Reyne released in February 1999. The album follows a four-year hiatus from recording, which saw Reyne's band Australian Crawl inducted into the ARIA Hall of Fame, and Reyne working in theatre (Little Shop of Horrors) and television (State Coroner). The album was recorded with friends and brothers Scott and Brett Kingman and further cemented his position as a unique, witty, thoughtful and challenging songwriter and singer. "Not Waving Drowning" and "Wonderful Today" were released as singles. A limited edition 2CD was released featuring live recordings of Reyne's tracks. The album was re-issued by Liberation Records in 2006

== Review ==
The album has been named a "critically lauded masterwork" and a "classic Australian album by one of Australia's true icons." From the opening track, "Wonderful Today", to the closing track, "Stranger than Fiction" (which looks at the incredibly odd Baptist boycott of the Walt Disney Company), this album covers a huge spectrum of musical styles.

Tomas Mureika of All Music said "Without question, Design for Living is James Reyne's happiest album. After a four-year hiatus from recording, Reyne returned with the dynamite one-two-three punch of "Wonderful Today," "Oh Oh Kimberley," and the title track, and he had never sounded lighter or more enthusiastic. This is not to say Reyne had softened his touch. His lyrics are still enigmatic, his trademark angst-ridden delivery intact but this is an album chock-full of potential radio-friendly singles." adding "A turn-of-the-millennium album that echoes the last of the carefree innocence of the 20th century".

== Track listing ==
CD (4509980932)

1. "Wonderful Today" - 2:59
2. "Oh Oh Kimberley" - 4:16
3. "Design for Living" - 3:31
4. "Poetry in Motion" - 2:50
5. "Nothin's Too Good for My Baby" - 4:27
6. "Reno"- 5:17
7. "Little Criminals" - 4:24
8. "I Don't Get Out Much Anymore" - 4:52
9. "Every Tooth a Tombstone" - 4:24
10. "Sleeping My Way to the Top" - 5:01
11. "After You've Gone" - 4:45
12. "Lizards From Lounges" - 3:58
13. "Not Waving, Drowning" - 2:53
14. "Stranger Than Fiction" - 3:35

Limited Edition Bonus Disc (James Reyne Live 99)

1. "Fall of Rome" - 5:26
2. "Ferris Wheel" - 3:51
3. "Harvest Moon" - 4:20
4. "Take a Giant Step" - 4:59
5. "Land of Hope and Glory"- 4:08
6. "Any Day Above Ground" - 3:28
7. "Heaven on a Stick" - 4:22
8. "Slave" - 3:52
9. "Some People" - 4:53
10. "Water Water" - 5:05

== Credits ==
- Bass – Chris Bekker, Mark Gray (tracks: 1,2,11,13)
- Drums – John Watson (tracks: 1,11,13)
- Electric Piano – Mark O'Connor (tracks: 1,13)
- Guitar, E-bow, Strings, Vocals – Brett Kingman
- Guitar, Vocals, Sequenced By [Programming] – Scott Kingman
- Organ, Piano – Dan Knight (tracks: 8,11)
- Vocals – Lindsay Field (tracks: 1,10), Tracy Kingman (tracks: 7, 8)
- Vocals, Guitar, Piano, Bass, Keyboards, Strings, Percussion – James Reyne

== Charts ==
Chart performance for Design for Living
Chart (1999)	Peak position
Australian Albums (ARIA)	153

== Release history ==
Region	Date	Format(s)	Label	Catalogue
Australia	23 February 1999	Compact Disc	Village Roadshow	101890-2
Australia	24 June 2006	Compact Disc, Music download	Liberation Records	BLUE1222
