= Earth & Sea =

Studio album by James Blundell
- Released: April 1995
- Recorded: Nashville, Tennessee, 1994
- Genre: Country; Contemporary country music
- Length: 86:01
- Label: EMI

James Blundell chronology
Touch of Water (1993)	Earth & Sea (1995)	Amsterdam Breakfast (1999)

Singles from Earth & Sea

Earth & Sea is the sixth studio album by Australian recording artist James Blundell, released in April 1995 by EMI. The album, a double disc set, peaked at number 31 on the ARIA Albums Chart in May 1995.

== Track listing ==
CD 1 (Earth)
No.	Title	Writer(s)	Length
1.	"Dust"		4:35
2.	"Carry a Candle"	James Blundell; Mark Seymour	3:29
3.	"Perpetual Child"	Blundell	3:47
4.	"Touch in Love"	Blundell	4:21
5.	"Forgive and Forget"	Blundell; Robbie Nevil	3:47
6.	"Handshake Deal"	Blundell	3:21
7.	"This Poor Town"	Blundell	3:46
8.	"My Old Friend and General Lee"	Blundell; M. Vaden	6:16
9.	"The Tree"	Blundell	4:23
10.	"Drowning in This Drought"	Blundell; Warren Burt; C. Jones	4:57

CD 2 (Sea)
No.	Title	Writer(s)	Length
1.	"Pride"	Blundell; C. Bailey	4:39
2.	"Hurt Is on the Inside"	Blundell	3:33
3.	"The 7:45"	M. Spiro; T. Pierce	4:26
4.	"Libby"	Blundell	5:24
5.	"Dark Ages"	Blundell	4:40
6.	"Guardian Angels"	Blundell	4:39
7.	"Bad Girl"	Blundell; R. Kennedy	4:16
8.	"Her Sweet Love"	Blundell; C. Jones	3:07
9.	"Walk On"	Blundell; G. Barnhill; V. Melamed	3:24
10.	"Something Sacred"	Blundell; R.Wilson	5:11

== Charts ==
Chart (1995)	Peak position
Australian Albums (ARIA)	31

== Release history ==
Region	Date	Format	Edition(s)	Label	Catalogue
Australia	April 1995	2xCD	Standard	EMI	833378
Australia	16 August 2008	2xCD	Re-release	EMI	057CDCB
