= Speedboats for Breakfast =

- Australian album cover

Studio album by James Reyne
- Released: 19 April 2004
- Recorded: December 2002 – December 2003
- Genre: Rock, pop
- Length: 43:08
- Label: Liberation Records
- Producer: James Reyne, Scott Kingman, Brett Kingman

James Reyne chronology
The Definitive Collection (2002)	Speedboats for Breakfast (2004)	And the Horse You Rode in On (2005)

Professional ratings
Review scores
Source	Rating
Allmusic	3/5 stars

Speedboats for Breakfast is the sixth solo studio album by Australian singer/songwriter James Reyne released on 19 April 2004. The album is Reyne's first studio album since Design for Living in 1999 and features a cover of Olivia Newton-John's "Have You Ever Been Mellow".

On the lead single "Bug" Reyne said: "I wanted to create a song out of playing the same four chords going round and round, building and growing all the time, with things coming in and dropping out. The listener knows there's transition but there's no real point where the change is obvious."

In a 2013 interview, when asked if there is a song he likes playing live, Reyne responded with "Oh usually some of the newer ones, there’s a song of mine called "Rainbow’s Dead End" that I like playing."

== Review ==
Tomas Mureika of All Music said the album was a grungier, heavier sound, unlike anything Reyne had ever done before. "Working with collaborator Scott Kingman, Reyne concocted a terrifying album that includes tracks with titles like "Nail," "Hangman's Wages," and "Pusherman." It all culminates in the album's final track, a remake of Olivia Newton-John's "Have You Ever Been Mellow" that does an almost punk run-through of the original. From the half-submerged clown's head on the album's original cover to the dense lyrics and production within, Reyne made the most frightening album of his career. At least he proved he could still push the envelope with the best of them".

== Track listing ==
CD/DD

1. "Bug" - 4:05
2. "The Rainbow's Dead End" - 4:34
3. "Stagefright" - 2:42
4. "Glamourpuss" - 3:06
5. "Pusherman" - 3:29
6. "Nail" - 3:31
7. "Love in a Strange Strange Land" - 4:41
8. "Hangman's Wages" - 3:58
9. "Hooray and Hallelujah" - 4:25
10. "Lustre" - 6:05
11. "Mellow" - 2:52

== Credits ==
- Bass – Mark Gray, Rex Fernandez
- Drums – John Watson, Max Waugh
- Engineer – Scott Kingman
- Guitar, Bass, Strings, Programmed By – Scott Kingman
- Guitar, Bass, Vocals – Brett Kingman
- Keyboards – Dan Knight
- Vocals, Guitar, Bass, Keyboards, Strings – James Reyne

== Charts ==
Chart performance for Speedboats for Breakfast
Chart (2004)	Peak position
Australian Albums (ARIA)	113

== Release history ==
Region	Date	Format(s)	Label	Catalogue
Australia	19 April 2004	Compact Disc, Music download	Liberation Records	LIBCD60932
