= House of Cards (James Reyne song) =

- CD single cover

Single by James Reyne

from the album Hard Reyne
- A-side: "House of Cards"
- B-side: "Walking In The Dreamtime"
- Released: 8 May 1989
- Genre: Pop/Rock
- Label: Capitol Records
- Songwriter(s): James Reyne, Simon Hussey
- Producer(s): John Hudson, Simon Hussey

James Reyne singles chronology
"Always the Way" (1988)	"House of Cards" (1989)	"One More River" (1989)

"House Of Cards" is the first single from Australian rock musician James Reyne’s second studio album Hard Reyne released in (1989). It peaked at number 17 in Australia.

== Background and Promotion ==
In 1988, Reyne toured Australia, promoting his debut self titled album with Tina Turner. He then returned to the studio to work on new music. "House of Cards" was released as the first single from his second solo album.

== Track listings ==
CD Single/ 7”

1. "House Of Cards" - 3:37
2. "Walking In The Dreamtime” - 5:05

=== Weekly charts ===
Chart (1989)	Peak position
Australia (ARIA)	17
