= Campfire (James Blundell album) =

Studio album by James Blundell
- Released: 3 February 2017
- Recorded: 2016
- Genre: Country; Contemporary country music
- Length: 41:03
- Label: Red Rebel Music, Revenge Music
- Producer

James Blundell chronology
Come On In (2015)	Campfire (2017)

Singles from Beautiful
- 1. "Borderline Summertime" Released: 11 January 2016; 2. "Money Changes Everything" Released: 16 December 2016; 3. "Rain on the Scarecrow" Released: 3 February 2017

Campfire is the twelfth studio album by Australian recording artist James Blundell, released in February 2017. The album peaked at number 58 on the ARIA Albums Chart, becoming Blundell's first album to make the top 100 since Earth & Sea in 1995.

== Background ==
In mid 2016, Blundell started the recording Campfire, following a conversation with collaborator and Red Rebel Music head Karen Waters about Bruce Springsteen's album Nebraska; an album recorded at home and on the cheap. Blundell told Canberra Times "She said to me, "How would you like to forget about the writing and do something just for the joy of singing?" And that sounded wonderful." With that in mind, Blundell and Waters unearthed songs with great stories and telling them the way you would around a campfire, with a beer and great friends.

== Track listing ==
No.	Title	Writer(s)	Length
1.	"Money Changes Everything" (with Bec Lavelle)	Tom Gray	5:59
2.	"Borderline Summertime"		4:26
3.	"6th Avenue Heartache" (with Jonny Taylor)	Jakob Dylan	4:37
4.	"Rain on the Scarecrow" (with The Wolfe Brothers)	John Mellencamp; George M. Green	3:22
5.	"Take It Easy" (with Bec Lavelle)		4:11
6.	"True Blue" (with Tania Kernaghan)	Madonna; Stephen Bray	3:12
7.	"No Surrender" (with Paul Costa)	Bruce Springsteen	4:04
8.	"Forty Miles to Saturday Night" (with Cameron Daddo)	Paul Kelly	3:26
9.	"Breakfast at Sweethearts"	Don Walker	3:26
10.	"Blowin' in the Wind" (with Anne Kirkpatrick, Liam Kennedy-Clark and Abigail Grace)	Bob Dylan	3:21

== Charts ==
Chart (2017)	Rank
Australian Albums Chart	58
Australian Artist Albums Chart	19
Australian Country Albums Chart	19

== Release history ==
Region	Date	Format	Edition(s)	Label	Catalogue
Australia	3 February 2017	CD; DD	Standard	Red Rebel Music, Revenge Music	RRM025
