= Hand It Down =

Studio album by James Blundell
- Released: July 1990
- Studio: Festival; 301; Sussex; (Sydney)
- Genre: Country; contemporary country
- Length: 37:14
- Label: EMI
- Producer: Garth Porter

James Blundell chronology
James Blundell (1989)	Hand It Down (1990)	This Road (1992)

Singles from Hand It Down
- 1. "Age of Grace" Released: July 1990; 2. "The Blue Heeler" Released: October 1990; 3. "Water" Released: 1991; 4. "Time on His Hands" Released: 16 September 1991

Hand It Down is the second studio album by Australian country music singer-songwriter James Blundell, released in July 1990 by EMI. It was produced by Garth Porter The album peaked at number 50 on the ARIA albums chart. It provided four singles "Age of Grace" (July 1990), "The Blue Heeler" (October), "Water" (1991) and "Time on His Hands" (September). At the 1991 ARIA Music Awards Hand It Down won Best Country Album.

== Background ==
Australian country music singer-songwriter James Blundell released his second studio album Hand It Down in July 1990. It was recorded across three studios in Sydney: Festival Studios, Studios 301 and Sussex Studios with Garth Porter (Rockwell T. James, the Sherbs, Sunnyboys) producing for EMI Records. Porter also provided keyboards, percussion and piano and co-wrote three tracks with Blundell. Blundell promoted Hand It Down with tours in Australia, United States and Canada. It provided four singles "Age of Grace" (July 1990), "The Blue Heeler" (October), "Water" (1991) and "Time on His Hands" (September).

== Reception ==
Professional ratings
Review scores
Source	Rating
AllMusic	3/5 stars

Megan Bird of The Canberra Times described Hand It Down as "a philosophical blend of ballads and up-tempo rockers which deal with life and the values of old rural Australia and the new urban world." AllMusic's reviewer rated it at three-out-of-five stars.

It debuted at number 77 on the ARIA Albums Chart for the week commencing 6 August 1990 and peaked at number 50 in October 1991. At the 1991 ARIA Music Awards Hand It Down won the Best Country Album.

== Track listing ==
All tracks are written by James Blundell, unless otherwise noted

No.	Title	Length
1.	"Age of Grace"	3:35
2.	"Time on His Hands" (Blundell, Denise McCumstie, Garth Porter)	3:44
3.	"The Blue Heeler"	4:17
4.	"Water" (Blundell, Zack Turner)	4:32
5.	"Rock Me" (Heather Field, James Gillard)	3:18
6.	"Hand It Down"	3:29
7.	"There Walks a Man"	3:32
8.	"I'm Afraid" (Blundell, Billy Dean)	3:30
9.	"Meanwhile" (Blundell, Porter)	4:16
10.	"Across the Miles" (Blundell, Porter)	3:01
Total length:		37:14

== Personnel ==
Credits:

Musicians

- James Blundell – lead vocals, acoustic guitar, harmonica, backing vocals
- Chris Bailey – backing vocals
- James Gillard – bass guitar, backing vocals
- Mark Meyer – drums
- Larry Muhoberac – piano, piano accordion
- Garth Porter – keyboards, percussion, piano
- Mark Punch – guitars (acoustic, electric), backing vocals
- Ian Simpson – banjo

Artisans

- Ted Howard – audio engineer
- Merran Laginestra – assistant engineer
- Garth Porter – producer

== Charts ==
Chart (1990–91)	Peak position
Australian Albums (ARIA)	50

== Release history ==
Region	Date	Format	Edition(s)	Label	Catalogue
Australia	July 1990	CD; MC	Standard	EMI Records	794791
