= The Magnificent Few =

EP by James Reyne
- Released: 3 July 2015
- Recorded: Woodstock Studios, Melbourne
- Genre: Rock music
- Length: 23:46
- Label: Bloodlines
- Producers: The Magnificent Few, Richard Stolz

James Reyne chronology
Live '99 (2015)	The Magnificent Few (2015)	All the Hits Live (2015)

The Magnificent Few is an extended play (EP) credited to James Reyne. The EP was released independently on 3 July 2015. The EP was funded by fans through PledgeMusic and 20% of all money raised will be donated to the Leukaemia Foundation. The Magnificent Few is Reyne on vocals, Phil Ceberano on guitar, John Watson on drums, Andy McIvor on bass and Brett Kingman on guitar. The cover art is designed by Damian Fulton.

== Background ==
In 2014, Reyne toured the 'James Reyne Plays Australian Crawl'. Reyne said "Everything about it was fun and positive" but decided it was time to record some new music saying that he writes all the time: "I'd like to think that the last six albums have been the best stuff that I’ve ever written in terms of lyrics, I enjoy writing lyrics, I enjoy writing".

Reyne explained the reason for the EP, "As I didn't want us to get ahead of ourselves and we are dipping our collective toe in the water, I figured that it also might be more expedient to record just 6/7 songs and present it as an extended EP or a mini-album. I had quite a few songs written, and lots of bits, so we rehearsed and whittled and blended them to the 7 to which we finally committed".

== Lyrical Content ==
"What A Pain In The Ass It Is..." is a scathing track although Reyne has no intention of unveiling just who might be the song's unnamed protagonist. "When it started off there was someone who inspired it, in the beginning, but not really, It quickly becomes just the usual amalgam of stuff and then you make up stuff, and then it just becomes a matter of playing with the words — you start enjoying yourself just playing with the words to make little twists and turns and rhymes and things like that. But there’s a rough basis in something, although I don’t want to say who it is obviously. And I wouldn’t want to qualify the person."

== Track listing ==
No.	Title	Length
1.	"What a Pain in the Arse It Is..."	3:44
2.	"I Can’t Help Myself"	3:45
3.	"One Little Kiss"	3:39
4.	"Suckerville"	3:43
5.	"I’d Still Be in Love with You" (featuring Mia Dyson)	4:33
6.	"Tryin’ to Catch The Wind"	4:22

== Charts ==
Chart (2015)	Peak position
Australian Albums (ARIA)	78
Australian Independent Albums (AIR)	16

== Release history ==
Region	Date	Format(s)	Label	Catalogue
Australia	3 July 2015	Digital download	Hammerhead Records	HHR6CD
