= Thirteen (James Reyne album) =

- Australian album cover

Studio album by James Reyne
- Released: 16 March 2012
- Studios: Hobbyhorse Studios & Supersonic Studios, Victoria, Australia
- Genres: Rock music, pop
- Labels: Hammerhead Records, MGM Records
- Producers: James Reyne, Tim Henwood, Scott Kingman

James Reyne chronology
TCB (2010)	Thirteen (2012)	The Anthology (2014)

Thirteen is the thirteenth solo album by Australian singer/songwriter James Reyne. (11 studio albums and 2 live albums). released on 16 March 2012. Reyne co-wrote tracks with producer Scott Kingman and Tim Henwood (from The Androids). The album covers a range of musical styles.

Reyne toured the album to positive reviews.

== Themes ==
Thirteen shares something with novelists such as John Cheever and Richard Ford, the notion that middle age, not youth, is when a person can make the most dangerous, destructive decisions in their life. Reyne said, "There's a desperation that comes with middle age, and there are things that can go wrong. The record is autobiographical - there's a song called "The Drone" that's written about me. It's a joke, but kind of true. I'm a big fan of Warren Zevon and Randy Newman, and they've always been frank in what they sang about while having fun with the phrases."

== Review ==
Stack Records gave the album 4.5 out of 5, saying "Thirteen could have been a self-indulgent mess. Instead, it’s perhaps Reyne’s finest solo album and one of the year’s best." adding "[it] is the sound of an artist coming to terms with his past."

== Track listing ==
CD/DD

1. "English Girls"
2. "Capsize"
3. "Whatcha Gonna Do About It?"
4. "Good Clean Fun"
5. "Stop"
6. "Mitterrand's Last Meal"
7. "The Drone"
8. "Digging a Hole in the Pines"
9. "The P.A.'s P.A."
10. "I Could Have Been Your Dad, Son"
11. "Tijuana Bibles"

== Charts ==
Chart performance for Thirteen
Chart (2012)	Peak position
Australian Albums (ARIA)	109

== Release history ==
Region	Date	Format(s)	Label	Catalogue
Australia	16 March 2012	Compact Disc, Music download	Hammerhead Records, MGM Records	HHR1
