= Touch of Water =

Studio album by James Blundell
- Released: August 1993
- Recorded: Studios 301, Sydney, Australia
- Genre: Country; Contemporary country music; rock
- Length: 67:16
- Label: EMI

James Blundell chronology
This Road (1992)	Touch of Water (1993)	Earth & Sea (1995)

Singles from Touch of Water
- 1. "Mysterious Ways" Released: August 1993

Touch of Water is the fourth studio album by Australian recording artist James Blundell, released in August 1993 by EMI. The album debuted and peaked at number eleven on the ARIA Albums Chart.

At the 1994 ARIA Music Awards, the album was nominated for Best Adult Contemporary Album. At the 1994 Country Music Awards, the album won Top Selling album of the Year.

== Track listing ==
No.	Title	Writer(s)	Length
1.	"Touch of Water"	James Blundell	4:39
2.	"Brilliant Man"	Blundell; K. Welsh	4:43
3.	"Walking Away"	Blundell	4:09
4.	"Mysterious Ways"	Blundell; R. Kennedy	3:44
5.	"So Close to Home"	Blundell	3:47
6.	"The Load"	Blundell; K. Looney	3:32
7.	"In Your Eyes"	Blundell; M. Punch	3:51
8.	"Fast Train"	Blundell	4:43
9.	"Doctor's Daughter"	Blundell	5:50
10.	"Can't Love Alone"	Blundell; G. Barnhill; V. Melamed	5:40
11.	"Better Get Used to It"	Blundell	4:47
12.	"Dream Ride"	Blundell	4:12
13.	"Song for a Hero"	Blundell	5:01
14.	"Two to One"	Lawrie Minson; P. Wookey	4:55
15.	"Weary of This World"	Blundell; T. Barnes	3:43

== Charts ==
Chart (1993)	Peak position
Australian Albums (ARIA)	11

== Release history ==
Region	Date	Format	Edition(s)	Label	Catalogue
Australia	August 1993	CD; cassette	Standard	EMI	827122
Australia	16 August 2008	CD	Re-release	EMI	056CDCB
