= Palm Beach (soundtrack) =

Palm Beach: Original Motion Picture Soundtrack

Soundtrack album by Various artists
- Released: 19 July 2019
- Label: Universal

Singles from Palm Beach: Original Motion Picture Soundtrack
- 1. "Fearless" Released: 5 July 2019

Palm Beach: Original Motion Picture Soundtrack is a soundtrack album for the Australian comedy drama film, Palm Beach (2019), released on 19 July 2019 by Universal Music Australia. The album has peaked at number 37 on the ARIA Charts.

== Singles ==
An original James Reyne song, "Fearless", written by Joanna Murray-Smith, Rachel Ward and Reyne was released as the soundtrack's lead single on 5 July 2019. A music video featuring excerpts from the film was released on YouTube on 1 August 2019.

== Track listing ==
| No. | Title | Performer(s) | Length |
|---|---|---|---|
| 1. | "Friday on My Mind" | The Easybeats | 2:44 |
| 2. | "Wild Thing" | The Troggs | 2:36 |
| 3. | "It's a Man's Man's Man's World" | Renée Geyer | 3:32 |
| 4. | "You Make Me Feel So Young" | Frank Sinatra | 2:57 |
| 5. | "Fearless" | James Reyne | 3:05 |
| 6. | "Feel Like Makin' Love" | Roberta Flack | 2:56 |
| 7. | "Let the Good Times Roll" | Louis Jordan & His Tympany Five | 2:51 |
| 8. | "Born to Be Wild" | Steppenwolf | 3:31 |
| 9. | "I've Been Loving You Too Long" | Otis Redding | 3:15 |
| 10. | "Catch the Wind" | Donovan | 2:55 |
| 11. | "(They Long to Be) Close to You" | Dami Im | 3:43 |
| 12. | "Soul Kind of Feeling" | Dynamic Hepnotics | 3:51 |
| 13. | "Let's Get it On" | Marvin Gaye | 4:54 |
| 14. | "This Old Heart of Mine (Is Weak for You)" | The Isley Brothers | 2:51 |
| 15. | "At Last" | Etta James | 3:02 |
| 16. | "Dancing in the Street" | Martha Reeves & The Vandellas | 2:36 |
| 17. | "Summertime" | Ella Fitzgerald | 5:00 |
| 18. | "Pain and Misery" | The Teskey Brothers | 4:00 |
| 19. | "Those Were the Days" | The Teskey Brothers | 1:21 |
| 20. | "Gardiner's Lament" | The Teskey Brothers | 2:29 |
| 21. | "The Albatross" | The Teskey Brothers | 0:48 |
| 22. | "Loomings" | The Teskey Brothers | 0:59 |
| 23. | "Fedallah's Prophecy" | The Teskey Brothers | 2:15 |
| 24. | "Get Me Outta the Rain" | The Teskey Brothers | 3:27 |
| 25. | "Fearless" (featuring Jess Ribeiro) | James Reyne | 3:05 |

== Charts ==
| Chart (2019) | Peak position |
|---|---|
| Australian Albums (ARIA) | 33 |

== Release history ==
| Region | Date | Format | Label |
|---|---|---|---|
| Australia | 19 July 2019 | CD, digital download, streaming | Universal Music Australia |
