= Postcards from Saigon =

Single by James Blundell

from the album Deluge
- Released: April 2005
- Recorded: The Warehouse and Monkeydoo Studios, Sydney
- Label: Revenge Records
- Songwriter(s): Terry McArthur, James Blundell
- Producer(s): Phil Rigger

"Postcards from Saigon" is a song by Australian singer-songwriter James Blundell. The song was written in 2003 as a tribute to the 48,000 Australian surviving Vietnam War veterans. The song also speaks out against the 2003 Iraq War.

In the song, the character's best friend dies in his arms in battle, later suffers a divorce and shares tragedy with a new wife who miscarries twice. In February 2005 Blundell told Nu Country "That wasn't my brother, it's more metaphoric. I have been intrigued by the Australian role in war service. My grandfather and father were in World War I and World War II".

In 2005, the song won Australian Independent Country Music Single of the Year and Independent Country Music Male Vocalist of the Year and was commended by Kris Kristofferson.

The single was released in April 2005 as the lead single from Blundell's eighth studio album Deluge (2005), with royalties donated to the Vietnam Veterans Association of Australia and the James Blundell Scholarship for the children of Vietnam Veterans. The song peaked at number 82 on the ARIA Charts in June 2005. The song remained in the Country Top 30 for four months and peaked at number 2 on the Australian Independent Singles Chart.

== Track listing ==
CD Single

1. "Postcards from Saigon"
2. "Nature's Gentleman" (with Feral Swing Katz - recorded live at Frankston Arts Centre on 24 February 2015)
3. "Postcards from Saigon" (with Feral Swing Katz - recorded live at Frankston Arts Centre on 24 February 2015)

== Charts ==
| Chart (2005) | Peak position |
|---|---|
| Australia (ARIA) | 82 |
