= James Blundell (album) =

Studio album by James Blundell
- Released: March 1989
- Recorded: Rich Music Studios, Sydney, Australia
- Genre: Country; Contemporary country music
- Label: EMI
- Producer: Garth Porter

James Blundell chronology
| James Blundell (1989) | Hand It Down (1990) |

Singles from James Blundell
- 1. "Cloncurry Cattle Song" Released: November 1988; 2. "Kimberly Moon" Released: July 1989

James Blundell is the debut studio album by Australian country music recording artist James Blundell, released in March 1989 by EMI. The album peaked at number 68 on the ARIA Albums Chart. The album includes the singles "Cloncurry Cattle Song" and "Kimberly Moon" which won Blundell the Male Vocalist of the Year award at the Country Music Awards of Australia in 1989 and 1990.

== Track listing ==
| No. | Title | Writer(s) | Length |
|---|---|---|---|
| 1. | "Dancers" | Ana Christensen | 3:51 |
| 2. | "Rainbows" | Allan Caswell | 2:55 |
| 3. | "Another Saturday Night" | Sam Cooke | 3:18 |
| 4. | "Kimberley Moon" | James Blundell; Doug Trevor | 3:44 |
| 5. | "Bandy" | Heather Field; James Gillard | 2:32 |
| 6. | "A Fool Such As I" | Bill Trader | 3:09 |
| 7. | "The Great Divide" | Porter; Blundell | 2:46 |
| 8. | "Texas" | Trevor; Blundell | 3:11 |
| 9. | "Cloncurry Cattle Song" | Blundell | 3:24 |
| 10. | "Perfect World" (featuring Donna Fisk) | Chris Stockley | 3:30 |

== Charts ==
| Chart (1989) | Peak position |
|---|---|
| Australian Albums (ARIA) | 68 |

== Release history ==
| Region | Date | Format | Edition(s) | Label | Catalogue |
|---|---|---|---|---|---|
| Australia | March 1989 | CD; cassette; vinyl | Standard | EMI | 791816 |
