= The Whiff of Bedlam =

- Australian album cover

Studio album by James Reyne
- Released: October 1994
- Recorded: 1994
- Genre: Rock music
- Label: rooArt
- Producer: Stuart Lavine

James Reyne chronology
The Best (1992)	The Whiff of Bedlam (1994)	Live in Rio (1996)

Singles from The Whiff of Bedlam
- 1. "Red Light Avenue" Released: September 1994; 2. "Day in the Sun" Released: January 1995; 3. "It's Only Natural" Released: 1995

Professional ratings
Review scores
Source	Rating
AllMusic	4.5/5 stars

The Whiff of Bedlam is the fourth solo studio album by Australian singer/songwriter James Reyne released in October 1994 and peaked at number 20 in Australia. The album was preceded by lead single "Red Light Avenue" in September 1994. It was his first album released under label rooArt.

== Review ==
Tomas Mureika of AllMusic said "An astonishingly mature album by any artist's rights, The Whiff of Bedlam delves into territory many would never even dare to approach, all the while remaining cloaked in some of the most gorgeous melodies Reyne has ever crafted. The opening "Who The Hell Do You Think You Are?" sets the agenda - from a wispy electric piano intro, Reyne launches into an enigmatically vicious attack against someone, yet does so simply through the dynamics of his voice, avoiding the high-pitched intensity that earmarked his earlier works. From then on, there are twelve achingly soulful confessionals through which Reyne seems constantly on the verge of tears. The devastating "It's Only Natural" moves from an organ intro through irresistable [sic] hook after hook, as Reyne seems to resign himself to his new discoveries as he has aged, only to immediately counter the downfall with the more upbeat melancholy of "Winds Of Change". With the harrowing possibilities unleashed by The Whiff of Bedlam, it is certain to say that Reyne has found his own day in the sun... and it keeps getting gloriously darker."

== Track listing ==
1. "Who the Hell Do You Think You Are?" (James Reyne)
2. "Red Light Avenue" (Wayne Burt)
3. "Lion in the Winter" (Reyne, Neil Larsen)
4. "Uptown Ruler" (Reyne, Larsen)
5. "Goin' Fishin'" (Reyne)
6. "It's Only Natural" (Reyne, Simon Hussey)
7. "Winds of Change" (Reyne, Brett Goldsmith)
8. "Only a Fool Would Say That" (Walter Becker, Donald Fagen)
9. "Walking in the Dreamtime" (Reyne, Hussey)
10. "Poor Man in the Penthouse" (Reyne, Larsen)
11. "No Secrets" (Reyne)
12. "Day in the Sun" (Reyne)

== Personnel ==
- James Reyne – vocals, acoustic guitar
- Bunny Hull – backing vocals
- Bob Glaub – bass
- Freddie Washington – bass
- John Patitucci – bass
- Vinnie Colaiuta – drums
- Daren Klein – engineering, mixing
- Mike Landau – guitar
- Lennie Castro – percussion
- Neil Larsen – piano, electric piano, organ
- Bill Payne – piano, organ
- Joel Peskin – saxophone
- Oscar Brashear – trumpet

== Charts ==
Chart performance for The Whiff of Bedlam
Chart (1994)	Peak position
Australian Albums (ARIA)	20
