= Electric Digger Dandy =

1991 album by James Reyne

- Australian album cover

Studio album by James Reyne
- Released: June 10, 1991
- Recorded: 1990–1991
- Genre: Rock
- Length: 47:00
- Label: Free City Music/ Virgin (Australia); Charisma (US)
- Producer: Simon Hussey

James Reyne chronology
| Hard Reyne (1989) | Electric Digger Dandy (1991) | The Best (1992) |

Singles from Electric Digger Dandy
- 1. "Slave" Released: May 1991; 2. "Any Day Above Ground" Released: July 1991; 3. "Some People" Released: November 1991

Alternative cover
- US album cover

Professional ratings
Review scores
| Source | Rating |
|---|---|
| AllMusic | 3/5 stars |

Electric Digger Dandy is the third solo studio album by Australian singer/songwriter James Reyne released in June 1991. The album was released in the United States as Any Day Above Ground. The album peaked at number 3 on the ARIA Charts and remains Reyne's highest-charting album.

The album saw Reyne's return to a more electric sound. It features the singles "Slave", "Any Day Above Ground" and "Some People", as well as a new, acoustic rendition of the Australian Crawl song "Reckless".

== Reception ==
Tomas Mureika of AllMusic wrote that on "Electric Digger Dandy Reyne expanded his musical boundaries with collaborations with Jim Vallance and Tony Joe White. The result is an invigorated Reyne, who seems to be having a great time winding his voice around gorgeous melodies and intense rants alike. Despite its nutty had-to-be-changed-for-America title, Digger Dandy finds a more introspective experimental Reyne, one content to play the music at a lower level and let his words and stiletto voice speak for itself."

== Track listing ==
1. "Some People" (J. Reyne, J. Vallance) – 4:13
2. "Slave" (J. Reyne, J. Vallance) – 4:13
3. "Reckless" (J. Reyne) – 5:19
4. "Any Day Above Ground" (J. Reyne) – 3:38
5. "Take a Giant Step" (J. Reyne, S. Hussey) – 5:10
6. "Company of Strangers" (J. Reyne, S. Hussey) – 4:05
7. "Black and Blue World" (J. Reyne, B. Goldsmith) – 4:06
8. "Stood Up" (J. Hiatt) – 4:52
9. "Outback Woman" (J. Reyne, T. J. White) – 3:38
10. "Water, Water" (J. Reyne) – 5:40
11. "Lay Your Weary Head Down" (J. Reyne) – 2:34

== Personnel ==
- James Reyne – vocals, guitar
- Jef Scott – guitars, bass, vocals
- Simon Hussey – keyboards, producer
- John Watson – drums

=== Guests ===
- Mick O'Connor – Hammond organ
- Renee Geyer – backing vocals
- Gene Black – guitar
- C. J. Vanston – keyboards
- Scott Griffiths – piano, Hammond organ, keyboards
- Steve Housden – guitar solo on "Slave"
- Richard Pleasance – mandolin
- Brett Kingman – electric guitar
- Mark Goldenberg – guitars, keyboards
- Kenny Aronoff – drums, percussion
- Jimmie Wood – harmonica
- Eric Lowen – backing vocals, acoustic guitar
- Dan Navarro – backing vocals, acoustic guitar
- Tony Joe White – electric guitar, harmonica, bass, drums
- John Pierce – bass
- Byron Berline – fiddle
- Jim McMains – backing vocals

== Charts ==
=== Weekly charts ===
| Chart (1991) | Peak position |
|---|---|
| Australian Albums (ARIA) | 3 |

=== Year-end charts ===
| Chart (1991) | Peak position |
|---|---|
| Australian Albums (ARIA) | 83 |

== Certifications ==
| Region | Certification | Certified units/sales |
|---|---|---|
| Australia (ARIA) | Gold | 35,000^{^} |
^{^} Shipments figures based on certification alone.
