= Red Light Avenue =

1994 single by James Reyne

- CD cover

Single by James Reyne

from the album The Whiff of Bedlam
- B-side: "Field Hippy"; "Log Rollin"
- Released: 19 September 1994
- Label: rooArt
- Songwriter: Wayne Burt
- Producer: Stewart Levine

James Reyne singles chronology
| "Way Out West" (1992) | "Red Light Avenue" (1994) | "Day in the Sun" (1995) |

"Red Light Avenue" is the first single from Australian rock musician James Reyne's fourth solo album, The Whiff of Bedlam.

== Track listing ==
CD single

1. "Red Light Avenue" (Wayne Burt)
2. "Field Hippy" (James Reyne)
3. "Red Light Avenue" (acoustic)
4. "Log Rollin'" (James Reyne)

== Charts ==
| Chart (1994) | Peak position |
|---|---|
| Australia (ARIA) | 32 |
