= Rip It Up (James Reyne song) =

"Rip it Up"
- CD single cover

Single by James Reyne

from the album James Reyne
- A-side: "Rip it Up"
- B-side: "Love Will Find a Way"
- Released: 7 December 1987
- Genre: Pop/Rock
- Label: Capitol Records
- Songwriter(s): James Reyne, Davitt Sigerson, Jef Scott
- Producer(s): Davitt Sigerson

James Reyne singles chronology
"Hammerhead" (1987)	"Rip it Up" (1987)	"Heaven on a Stick" (1988)

"Rip it Up" is the third single from Australian rock musician James Reyne’s debut self titled solo studio album in (1987).

== Background and promotion ==
Reyne was the lead singer of Australian rock band Australian Crawl who played their final show is at the Perth Entertainment Centre on 1 February 1986. Following this, Reyne began work on his solo career. Reyne's 1987/88 tour was called the "Rip it Up Tour" after this track.

== Track listings ==
CD Single/ 7”

1. "Rip it Up" - 3:34
2. "Love Will Find a Way" -

Vinyl / 12"

- A1 "Rip It Up" (Cuttin' The Rug Version) - 6:37
- A2 "Rip It Up" (Bonus Beats) - 1:57
- B1 "Rip It Up" (Dub Mix) - 5:21
- B2 "Rip It Up" (Alternate Dub Mix) - 5:24

== Chart positions ==
Chart (1987–1988)	Peak position
Australia (Australian Music Report)	34
