= James Reyne =

Australian musician (born 1957)

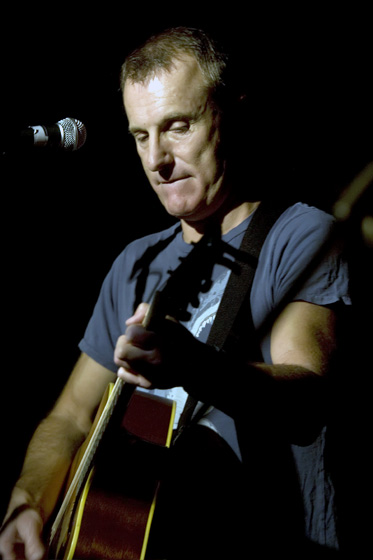
- James Reyne in 2008

Background information
- Born: James Michael Nugent Reyne; 19 May 1957 (age 69); Lagos, Nigeria
- Origin: Mount Eliza, Victoria, Australia
- Genres: Rock, folk rock
- Occupations: Musician, singer-songwriter
- Instruments: Guitar; vocals; piano; harmonica
- Years active: 1975–present
- Labels: Geffen, Virgin, Liberation
- Website: jamesreyne.com.au

James Michael Nugent Reyne OAM (born 19 May 1957) is an Australian musician. He achieved fame as the lead singer of Australian Crawl and Company of Strangers and subsequently went on to a successful solo career.

== Biography ==
=== Early years ===
Reyne was born in Lagos, Nigeria. His father, Rodney Michael Reyne, was an English-born former Royal Marine who served as aide-de-camp to the governor of the state of Victoria, Sir Dallas Brooks, and subsequently worked for British Petroleum. His paternal grandfather, Cecil Nugent Reyne, was an English rear admiral. His mother, Judith Graham, née Leask, was a teacher. His younger brother, David Reyne, was also born in Nigeria. The family moved to Victoria in late 1959, where a younger sister Elisabeth was born.

Reyne lived in Mount Eliza, Victoria, was educated at the Peninsula School and studied drama at the Victorian College of Arts. He formed a band called Spiff Rouch containing fellow locals Bill McDonough, Guy McDonough, Brad Robinson, Paul Williams, Robert Walker, Mark Hudson and Simon Binks. By early 1978, Spiff Rouch had split and Reyne formed Clutch Cargo services with Binks, Robinson, Williams and his younger brother David Reyne.

=== Australian Crawl ===
In late 1978, Clutch Cargo was renamed Australian Crawl and started to gain popularity on the pub circuit. David Reyne left to continue an acting course and was replaced by Bill McDonough. Australian Crawl made a memorable debut on the Countdown TV show. Reyne performed with both arms in plaster casts, a result of injuries sustained after being hit by a car. The band went on to sell more than one million albums in Australia in the 1980s. Their most popular songs are "Reckless", "Beautiful People", "Errol", "The Boys Light Up", "Things Don't Seem", "Oh No Not You Again" and "Downhearted". They were voted Countdown 1981 Most Popular Group, and Reyne was 1980 and 1981 Most Popular Male Performer. After the band split up in 1986, Reyne went on to a successful solo career.

=== Solo career ===
==== 1985–1999 ====
While still with Australian Crawl, Reyne teamed with Lin Buckfield of Electric Pandas to release a 1985 single, "R.O.C.K." / "Under My Thumb".

In 1987, Reyne released his self titled debut solo album and started the "Rip it Up" tour. The first two singles released from the album, "Fall of Rome" and "Hammerhead", were top-10 hits in Australia, followed by the less-successful "Rip It Up" and "Heaven On a Stick". The album was re-packaged in 1988 to include a further top 10 single, "Motor's Too Fast" (peaking at #6 on the ARIA chart), replacing "Coin in a Plate", which had appeared on the original 1987 release. "Always The Way" was released as the sixth and final single from the album, but peaked outside the top 50.

His debut was followed in May 1989 by his next solo release, Hard Reyne, which featured the hits "House of Cards" (#17 ARIA Charts) and "One More River" (#22 ARIA Charts). The album was produced By Simon Hussey. The project was launched with a live televised performance on Australia's MTV program on the Nine Network and an Australian tour in late 1989. A further two singles, "Trouble in Paradise" (Oct 1989) and "Harvest Moon" (Jan 1990), were released from the album.

In 1991, Electric Digger Dandy was released. Mindful of the American market (where the album was released under the title of Any Day Above Ground), Electric Digger Dandy included a revamped version of the Australian Crawl hit "Reckless" as well as a cover of John Hiatt's "Stood Up", a duet with American singer-songwriter Tony Joe White. Single releases from the album included "Slave" (#10 ARIA Charts), "Any Day Above Ground" and "Some People". It remains Reyne's highest-charting album in Australia, reaching No. 3 on the ARIA albums chart.

In 1992, he recorded a duet with country singer James Blundell (a cover of The Dingoes' song, Way Out West). It hit No. 2 on the Australian charts, Reyne's highest charting solo single. Later that year he joined former Sherbet frontman Daryl Braithwaite, Jef Scott and Simon Hussey to create the album Company of Strangers, which spawned three Australian top 50 singles: "Motor City (I Get Lost)", "Sweet Love", "Daddy's Gonna Make You a Star". A fourth single released from the album, "Baby, You're a Rich Man", failed to enter the top 100.

October 1994 saw the release of his fourth album, on the RooArt label, The Whiff of Bedlam, recorded in Los Angeles with Stewart Levine. The singles released from the album were "Red Light Avenue", "Day in the Sun" (Dec 1994) and "It's Only Natural" (April 1995).

Reyne and his band continued overseas to Europe, UK and South America. Recorded live in South America, the double-album "Live in Rio" was released in April 1996. A single edit of "Oh No, Not You Again (live)" was released to coincide with the album. In September 1996, Reyne took to the Enmore Theatre stage in a David Atkins production of the musical Little Shop of Horrors.

Reyne returned to the studio in 1997 to work with producer Ashley Caddell. Now signed to Village Roadshow Music, the first release was "Brand New Emperor's Clothes" in October 1997. Reyne continued to write and record new material throughout 1998–1999. In 1999, the Design For Living album was released. In 1999, he was a guest performer on John Farnham's "I Can't Believe He's 50 Tour". His duet with Farnham, "Don't You Know It's Magic", is included in John Farnham's album Live at the Regent Theatre.

==== 2004–2007 ====
After a few years' break between studio albums, Reyne signed with Liberation Music in Australia. In 2004 he released Speedboats for Breakfast, which included the singles "Bug" and "The Rainbow's Dead End". Of "Bug" James said: "I wanted to create a song out of playing the same four chords going round and round, building and growing all the time, with things coming in and dropping out. The listener knows there's transition but there's no real point where the change is obvious". This was followed in March 2005 by the album ...And The Horse You Rode In On, which contained acoustic reworkings of some of his best-known solo and Australian Crawl compositions.

In February 2005, Australian dance producers Smash 'n' Grab remixed Australian Crawl's "Reckless", which peaked at #42 in Australia.

Reyne hosted Dig, a music show on ABC2 (2006–2007), and made an appearance on The AFL Footy Show in Melbourne in 2006. In May 2007, he released a new studio album, Every Man a King, which features the singles "Light in the Tunnel" and "Little Man You've Had a Busy Day". A second acoustic album, Ghost Ships, was released in September 2007.

==== 2010–present ====
In April 2010 Reyne released, TCB (Taking Care of Business), a collection of Elvis Presley covers. The album debuted at number 32 on the ARIA Albums chart. In November 2011, he released a single, "English Girls", followed by his most autobiographical song, "Capsize", in January 2012. Both songs feature on Reyne's album Thirteen (March 2012). Two more singles were released; "Whatcha Gonna Do About It?" and "Good Clean Fun".

In the Australia Day Honours of 2014, Reyne was recognised with a Medal of the Order of Australia in the General Division "for service to the performing arts as a singer/songwriter, and through support for a range of charitable organisations".

Universal Records released a two-CD set, The Anthology, on 1 August 2014. The double album featured all of Reyne's earlier hits on Disc 1 and a collection of his more recent material and radio singles on Disc 2. In late 2014, Reyne launched a "James Reyne Plays Australian Crawl" series of shows across Australia. Performing only songs from the Australian Crawl catalogue, Reyne stated it was the closest thing to a reunion as fans were ever to get.

In July 2019, Reyne released an original song titled "Fearless" for the Australian film Palm Beach soundtrack.

In April 2020, Reyne announced the release of his twelfth studio album, Toon Town Lullaby, alongside the album's lead single of the same name.

== Acting career ==
Reyne appeared in the 1983 TV drama miniseries Return to Eden as Greg Marsden. He also played Tina Turner's manager Roger Davies in the 1993 bio-movie about Turner's life, What's Love Got to Do with It. In 2005 he appeared as a guest actor in the telemovie The Postcard Bandit, which used music by Australian Crawl on its soundtrack.

== Personal life ==
Reyne is the older brother of drummer and TV presenter David Reyne. Their younger sister, Elisabeth, was married to Simon Hussey. They co-produced Daryl Braithwaite's 1991 album Higher Than Hope. Hussey produced and engineered Reyne's early albums and both were bandmates in Company of Strangers, with Braithwaite, for the 1992 album of the same name and related singles.

Reyne is the father of a daughter, and a son: Neighbours actor Jaime-Robbie Reyne. He lives on the Mornington Peninsula.

== Discography ==
=== Albums (solo) ===
Studio

- James Reyne (1987)
- Hard Reyne (1989)
- Electric Digger Dandy (1991)
- The Whiff of Bedlam (1994)
- Design for Living (1999)
- Speedboats for Breakfast (2004)
- ...And the Horse You Rode In On (2005)
- Every Man a King (2007)
- Ghost Ships (2007)
- TCB (2010)
- Thirteen (2012)
- Toon Town Lullaby (2020)

EP

- James Reyne and the Magnificent Few (2015)

Live albums

- Live in Rio (1996)
- One Night in Melbourne (2007)
- Live '99 (2015)
- All the Hits Live (2015)
- Live in The Corner Hotel Front Bar (2022)

Compilations

- The Best (1992)
- Reckless: 1979–1995 (2000)
- The Definitive Collection (2002)
- The Essential James Reyne (2008)
- The Anthology (2014)

=== Albums (Company of Strangers) ===
- Company of Strangers (1993)

== Awards and nominations ==
=== APRA Music Awards ===
The APRA Music Awards were established by Australasian Performing Right Association (APRA) in 1982 to honour the achievements of songwriters and music composers, and to recognise their song writing skills, sales and airplay performance, by its members annually.

Year	Nominee / work	Award	Result	Ref.
2025	"Boys Light Up" by ChillinIT (Blake Turnell, James Reyne, Malik Sanders)	Most Performed Hip Hop / Rap Work	Nominated	

=== ARIA Music Awards ===
The ARIA Music Awards is an annual awards ceremony that recognises excellence, innovation, and achievement across all genres of Australian music. They commenced in 1987.

Year	Nominee / work	Award	Result
1988	himself	Best New Talent	Nominated
1989	"Motor's Too Fast"	Best Male Artist	Nominated
1996	(as part of) Australian Crawl	ARIA Hall of Fame	inductee

=== Country Music Awards of Australia ===
The Country Music Awards of Australia (CMAA) (also known as the Golden Guitar Awards) is an annual awards night held in January during the Tamworth Country Music Festival, celebrating recording excellence in the Australian country music industry. They have been held annually since 1973.

Year	Nominee / work	Award	Result
1993	"Way out West" (with James James Blundell)	Vocal Group or Duo of the Year	Won

=== TV Week / Countdown Awards ===
Countdown was an Australian pop music TV series on national broadcaster ABC-TV from 1974 to 1987, it presented music awards from 1979 to 1987, initially in conjunction with magazine TV Week. The TV Week / Countdown Awards were a combination of popular-voted and peer-voted awards.

Year	Nominee / work	Award	Result
1980	James Reyne (Australian Crawl)	Most Popular Male Performer	Won
1981	James Reyne (Australian Crawl)	Most Popular Male Performer	Won
1983	James Reyne (Australian Crawl)	Most Popular Male Performer	Nominated
