= Hard Reyne =

1989 album by James Reyne

Studio album by James Reyne
- Released: May 1989
- Recorded: 1988–1989
- Studio: Mayfair Mews Residential
- Genre: Rock
- Label: Capitol, EMI
- Producer: John Hudson, Simon Hussey

James Reyne chronology
James Reyne (1987)	Hard Reyne (1989)	Electric Digger Dandy (1991)

Singles from Hard Reyne
- 1. "House of Cards" Released: May 1989; 2. "One More River" Released: July 1989; 3. "Trouble In Paradise" Released: 28 August 1989; 4. "Harvest Moon" Released: 1990

Professional ratings
Review scores
Source	Rating
AllMusic	3/5 stars

Hard Reyne is the second solo album by Australian singer/songwriter James Reyne. It was released in May 1989 and peaked at number 7 on the ARIA Charts. The album produced four singles, "House of Cards", "One More River", "Trouble in Paradise" and "Harvest Moon".

== Review ==
Tomas Mureika of AllMusic said; "Further collaboration with Simon Hussey finds Reyne treading water to some degree, trying to replicate the success of his debut, while lacking the fury and energy that made that album so utterly compelling. "One More River" and "Wake Up Deadman" share a more traditionally bluesy feel, while "House Of Cards" tries to echo the intensity of earlier classics. A mellower, less surprising effort. Hard Reyne is not a bad album by any means, there is just nothing here to render it great."

== Track listing ==
1. "House of Cards" (James Reyne, Simon Hussey) – 4:26
2. "Rumour" (Reyne, Hussey) – 3:32
3. "No Such Thing as Love" (Reyne, Hussey) – 4:32
4. "One More River" (Reyne) – 4:01
5. "Shine On" (Reyne, Hussey) – 5:39
6. "Harvest Moon" (Reyne, Hussey) – 4:14
7. "Lamp of Heaven" (Reyne, Hussey) – 3:19
8. "Drifting Away (Confusion of Slow Novas)" (Reyne, Hussey) – 3:37
9. "Trouble in Paradise" (Reyne, Mark Grieg) – 4:08
10. "Five Miles Closer to the Sun" (Reyne, Hussey) – 4:37
11. "Wake Up Dead Man" (Reyne, Hussey) – 3:43

== Personnel ==
- Judy Cheeks – backing vocals (track 4)
- Sonny Southon – backing vocals (tracks 5, 7 and 9)
- Andy Cichon – bass
- John Watson – drums
- James Ralston – guitar (tracks: 1 to 5, 9)
- Simon Hussey – keyboards, sequencer programming, congas
- Ollie Marland – piano (track 6)
- Gary Barnacle – saxophone (tracks 1 and 4)
- John Thirkell – trumpet (track 1)

== Charts ==
=== Weekly charts ===
Chart (1989)	Peak position
Australian Albums (ARIA)	7

=== Year-end charts ===
Chart (1989)	Position
Australian Albums (ARIA)	34

== Certification ==
Region	Certification	Certified units/sales
Australia (ARIA)	Platinum	70,000^{^}
^{^} Shipments figures based on certification alone.
