= Any Day Above Ground =

1991 single by James Reyne

- CD single cover

Single by James Reyne

from the album Electric Digger Dandy
- B-side: "Ferris Wheel"
- Released: 22 July 1991
- Length: 3:34
- Label: Virgin
- Songwriter(s): James Reyne
- Producer(s): Simon Hussey

James Reyne singles chronology
"Slave" (1989)	"Any Day Above Ground" (1991)	"Some People" (1991)

"Any Day Above Ground" is the second single from Australian rock musician James Reyne's third studio album, Electric Digger Dandy. Released in July 1991, the song peaked at number 67 on the Australian Singles Chart.

== Track listings ==
CD single and 7-inch

1. "Any Day Above Ground" (album mix)
2. "Any Day Above Ground" (7-inch mix)
3. "Ferris Wheel"

CD maxi

1. "Any Day Above Ground" (album mix) – 3:41
2. "Fall of Rome" recorded live at The Palais, Melbourne, Australia, July 12, 1991) – 5:58
3. "One More River" (recorded live at The Palais, Melbourne, Australia, July 12, 1991) – 4:55
4. "Ferris Wheel" – 4:09

== Charts ==
Weekly Chart performance for "Any Day Above Ground"
Chart (1991)	Peak position
Australia (ARIA)	67
