= James Reyne (album) =

Studio album by James Reyne
- Released: September 1987
- Recorded: 1987
- Genre: Rock
- Length: 50:39
- Label: Capitol, EMI
- Producer: Davitt Sigerson

James Reyne chronology
James Reyne (1987)	Hard Reyne (1989)

Singles from James Reyne
- 1. "Fall of Rome" Released: July 1987; 2. "Hammerhead" Released: September 1987; 3. "Rip It Up" Released: December 1987; 4. "Heaven on a Stick" Released: February 1988; 5. "Motor's Too Fast" Released: June 1988; 6. "Always the Way" Released: November 1988

Professional ratings
Review scores
Source	Rating
AllMusic	4/5 stars

James Reyne is the debut studio album by Australian singer-songwriter James Reyne, released in September 1987. It was the singer's first solo venture since the break-up of the band Australian Crawl in 1986.

Six singles were released from the album: "Fall of Rome", "Hammerhead", "Rip it Up", "Heaven on a Stick", "Motor's Too Fast" and "Always The Way".

The album was re-released on vinyl in January 2017 to celebrate its 30th anniversary.

The Chantoozies, of which Reyne's brother David was a member, covered "Motor's Too Fast" under the title "Slightest Notion" for their 1988 self-titled debut.

== Review ==
Tomas Mureika of AllMusic said, "Reyne uses his voice as an instrument, leaping wildly across complex melody lines littered with irresistable [sic] hooks" adding the album is "one of the most striking albums of the late-eighties".

In a Cash Box review, they said "Australian musician's American debut showcasing accessible and intelligent pop/rock and should garner healthy AOR attention immediately."

== Track listing ==
1. "Fall of Rome" (Reyne) – 4:57
2. "Hammerhead" (Reyne / Hussey) – 4:46
3. "Mr. Sandman" (Reyne / Hussey) – 4:25
4. "Counting on Me" (Reyne / Sigerson) – 4:29
5. "Always the Way" (Reyne / Hussey) – 7:23
6. "Land of Hope and Glory" (Reyne) – 4:18
7. "Heaven on a Stick" (Reyne / Hussey) – 3:24
8. "Motor's Too Fast" (Reyne / Hussey) – 4:13 (US & European release and 1988 Australian re-release)
9. "Rip it Up" (Reyne / Scott / Sigerson) – 5:42
10. "Burning Wood" (Reyne) – 2:43
11. "The Traveller" (Reyne / Scott / Sigerson) – 4:18
12. "Coin in a Plate" (Reyne / Hussey) (1987 Australian release only) – 4:14

== Personnel ==
- James Reyne – vocals, guitar
- Jef Scott – guitars, bass, vocals
- Davey Faragher – bass
- John Watson – drums and percussion

=== Guests ===
- Phil Shenale – keyboards
- David Baerwald – guitar
- David Lindley – lap steel and Hawaiian guitars
- Paulinho Da Costa – percussion
- Olivia Newton-John – backing vocals on "Hammerhead"
- Bill Payne – piano
- David Ricketts – guitar, keyboards
- Peter Snell – guitar
- Lee Curreri – keyboards
- Bob Thiele – keyboards

== Charts ==
=== Weekly charts ===
Chart (1987)	Peak position
Australian Albums (Australian Music Report)	4

=== Year-end charts ===
Chart (1987)	Position
Australian Albums (Kent Music Report)	25

== Certification ==
Region	Certification	Certified units/sales
Australia (ARIA)	2× Platinum	140,000^{^}
^{^} Shipments figures based on certification alone.

== See also ==
- List of Top 25 albums for 1987 in Australia
