= James Blundell (singer) =

Australian country singer

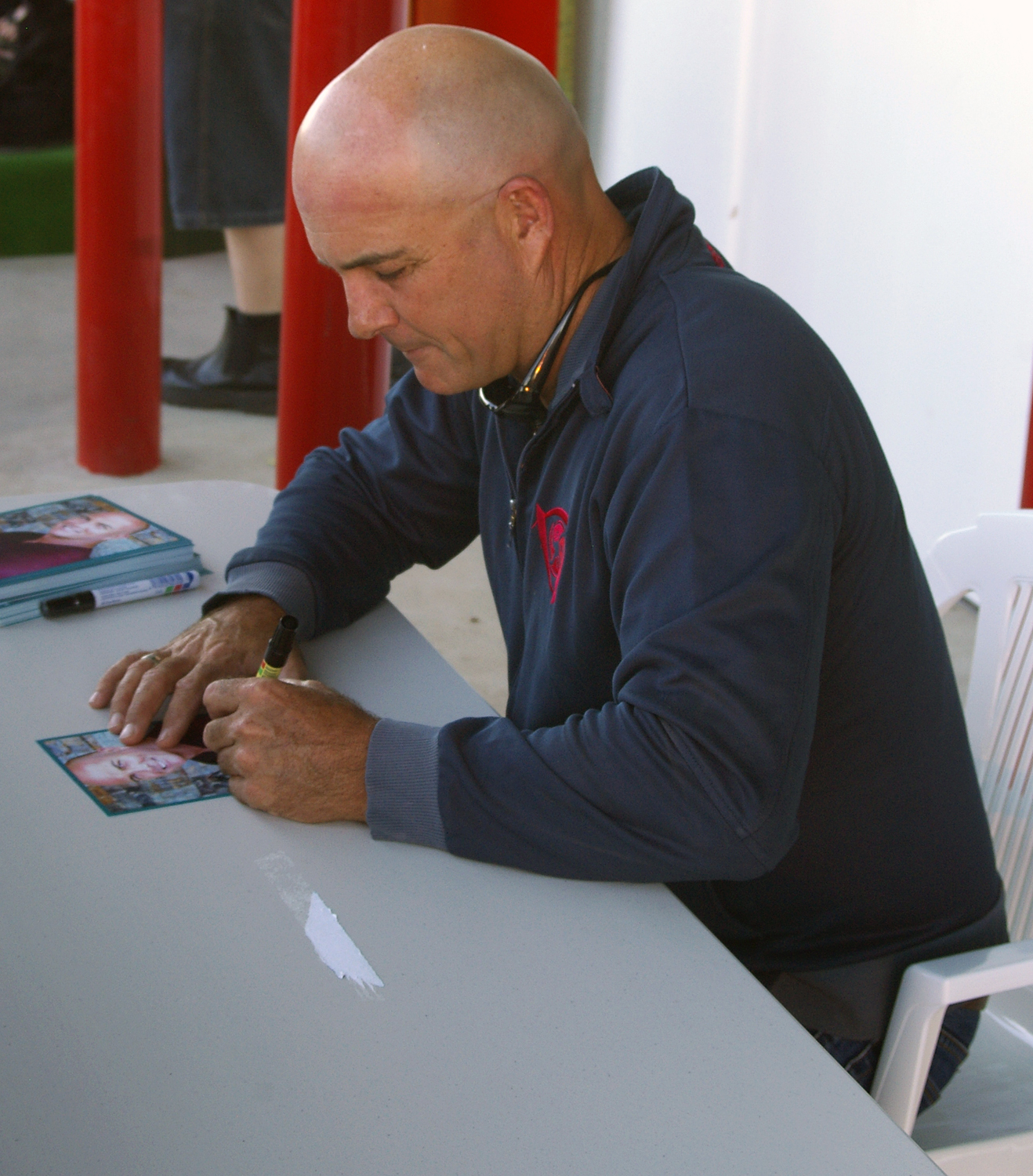
- Blundell in 2009

Background information
- Born: 8 December 1964 (age 61)
- Origin: Stanthorpe, Queensland, Australia
- Genres: Country, country rock
- Occupation: Singer-songwriter
- Instruments: Vocals, guitar
- Years active: 1987–present
- Labels: EMI, ABC, Compass Brothers, Revenge, Red Rebel
- Website: jamesblundell.com.au

James Blundell (born 8 December 1964) is an Australian country music singer. Born in Stanthorpe, Queensland, Blundell first rose to prominence after being named "best new talent" at the 1987 Country Music Awards of Australia. Blundell has since released several albums in both Australia and the United States, with his most successful album This Road (released in 1992) selling more than 145,000 copies in Australia. Blundell was an unsuccessful candidate for the Senate in Queensland at the 2013 federal election, running for Katter's Australian Party. At the 2019 Country Music Awards of Australia, Blundell was inducted into the Hall of Fame.

== Early life ==
Blundell was born in Queensland town of Stanthorpe, and was brought up on a sheep and cattle station near the town. As an adult he worked as a station hand across various locations in northern Australia. After a back injury sustained while working on a farm in Papua New Guinea he turned to music.

== Music career ==
=== 1987–1991: Career beginnings ===
In 1987, Blundell won the Australia's Starker Quest at the Country Music Awards of Australia (CMAA) and won a recording contract with RCA Victor Australia where he released "Gidgee Bug Pub Song". In 1988, Blundell won the Golden Guitar Award for the "Best New Talent". Blundell signed with EMI released his eponymous debut studio album in 1989. The album spawned the singles "Cloncurry Cattle Song" and "Kimberley Moon"; both of which won him Male Vocalist of the Year awards at the CMAA in 1989 and 1990. In 1990, Blundell contributed "Until the Next Big Dry" for the 1990 compilation album Breaking Ground - New Directions in Country Music. Late in 1990, Blundell released his second studio album Hand It Down which peaked at number 50 on the ARIA charts in 1991 and won him his first ARIA Award in 1991 for Best Country Album. The single "Age of Grace" won Blundell his third consecutive Male Vocalist of the Year awards at the CMAA in 1991.

=== 1992–2002: Commercial Success with EMI ===
In March 1992, Blundell released a cover of The Dingoes' song "Way Out West" with James Reyne. The song was a commercial success peaking at number 2 on the ARIA Charts and was certified gold. It won Blundell his first APRA Award for Country Song of the Year. In April, Blundell released his third studio album This Road which peaked at number 4 on the ARIA Charts, was certified platinum and has sold more than 145,000 copies in Australia. Additional singles "This Road" and "Down on the Farm" were released in 1992 and Blundell won two more Golden Guitar awards at the 1993 CMAA, including Top Selling album of the Year. In August 1993, Blundell released Touch of Water which peaked at number 11 on the ARIA Charts. Blundell continued to play regularly at folk and country music festivals around Australia. In April 1995, Blundell released his fifth studio album Earth & Sea which peaked at number 31. In 1996, disillusioned with the music industry, around Europe in a van, earning money by busking. In 1997, Blundell featured in a Qantas commercial, singing "I Still Call Australia Home", and in the lead-up to the 1999 Australian republic referendum, Blundell recorded the official song for the "No" campaign, despite being in favour of a republic. In 1999, Blundell released his sixth studio album Amsterdam Breakfast which sold 8,000 copies. In August 2001, EMI released his first greatest hits album, I Shall Be Released: The Best of James Blundell, which concluded his record deal.

=== 2003–2012: Independent Artist, CMAA Hands of Fame and CMC Hall of Fame ===
As an independent artist, Blundell garnered media attention for his 2003 song "Postcards from Saigon", speaking out against the war in Iraq. In 2005, the song won Australian Independent Country Music Single of the Year and Independent Country Music Male Vocalist of the Year. In 2005, Blundell released Deluge, followed by Ring Around the Moon in 2007 and Portrait of a Man in 2008.

In 2007, Blundell was inducted into the Australia Country Music Hands of Fame. In October 2010 Blundell was the narrator for Network Ten's television show, Keeping up with the Joneses and for four months from November 2010, Blundell performed in a musical theatre show, The Ultimate Rock 'n' Roll Jam Session, with Nick Barker, Dave Larkin, Ezra Lee and Doug Parkinson. Blundell released his tenth studio album Woolshed Creek in April 2011. In March 2012, Blundell was the inaugural inductee into the Country Music Channel's Hall of Fame.

=== 2013–present: politics and music ===
In June 2013, Blundell became a candidate in the 2013 Australian federal election. In August 2015, Blundell released Come on In and in February 2017, his twelfth studio album Campfire which became his first charting album in over 20 years, peaking at number 58. In February 2018, a tribute album 30 Years of Pride: A Tribute to James Blundell was released.

== Politics ==
In June 2013, Blundell was selected as Katter's Australian Party's lead Senate candidate for Queensland in the 2013 federal election. This was largely at the urging of Bob Katter, the party's founder and only federal member of parliament. Blundell had previously been approached to stand in elections by the Liberal National Party (LNP), but declined. His selection was controversial within the party, in part because he had not been a party member before his candidacy was announced, and contributed to a former vice-president, Kevin Brown, resigning his membership. Some of Blundell's political positions have been controversial within the party, notably his support for same-sex marriage and the abolition of penalty rates.

== Personal life ==
Blundell has been married twice—first to Louise, a former manager, and second to Lidia, with whom he had two sons. He left his second wife in August 2007 for Jesse Curran, a singer who he had met at one of his concerts and while she was a contestant on Australian Idol. He and Curran have since had two children together, Fian Blundell and Ria Blundell.

Blundell was engaged to Kristal Padget in 2017. In March 2020 he announced his engagement to Rebecca Williams, 28 years after she inspired his 1992 hit "Down on the Farm".

In May 2010, Blundell filed for bankruptcy, having gone into debt attempting to finance his albums, as well as having lost money on the sale of an investment property the previous year. The bankruptcy was discharged in April 2013—had it not been, he would have ineligible to stand as a candidate for election.

Blundell's brother, Peter Blundell, died on 24 December 2021. He was a former mayor of the Stanthorpe Shire and the Southern Downs Region as well as the LNP candidate for Keppel in the 2017 Queensland state election.

== Discography ==
- James Blundell (1989)
- Hand It Down (1990)
- This Road (1992
- Touch of Water (1993)
- Earth & Sea (1995)
- Amsterdam Breakfast (1999)
- Deluge (2005)
- Ring Around the Moon (2007)
- Portrait of a Man (2008)
- Woolshed Creek (2011)
- Come on In (2015)
- Campfire(2017)
- World Don't Stop (2023)
- Patience Wins (2025)

== Awards ==
=== AIR Awards ===
The Australian Independent Record Awards (commonly known informally as AIR Awards) is an annual awards night to recognise, promote and celebrate the success of Australia's Independent Music sector.

Year	Nominee / work	Award	Result
2009	Portrait of a Man	Best Independent Country Album	Nominated

=== ARIA Music Awards ===
The ARIA Music Awards are a set of annual ceremonies presented by Australian Recording Industry Association (ARIA), which recognise excellence, innovation, and achievement across all genres of the music of Australia. They commenced in 1987. Blundell had been nominated for five ARIA Music Awards and has won one.

Year	Nominee / work	Award	Result
1991	Hand it Down	Best Country Album	Won
1992	"Time on His Hands"	Best Country Album	Nominated
1993	This Road	Best Country Album	Nominated
1994	Touch of Water	Best Adult Contemporary Album	Nominated
2007	Ring Around the Moon	Best Country Album	Nominated

=== APRA Awards ===
The APRA Awards are held in Australia and New Zealand by the Australasian Performing Right Association to recognise songwriting skills, sales and airplay performance by its members annually. Blundell has been nominated for three awards and has won one.

Year	Nominee / work	Award	Result
1992	"Way Out West" (with James Reyne)	Country Song of the Year	Won
1999	"Goondiwindi Moon" (with Lee Kernaghan and Garth Porter)	Most Performed Country Work	Nominated
2008	"Higher Than Heavan"	Country Work of the Year	Nominated

=== Country Music Awards (CMAA) ===
Blundell has won ten Golden guitar awards at the Tamworth Country Music Awards of Australia. In 2019, Blundell was inducted into the Australian Roll of Renown, which honours Australian and New Zealander musicians who have shaped the music industry by making a significant and lasting contribution to Country Music.

Year	Nominee / work	Award	Result (wins only)
1987	himself	Star Maker	Won
1988	"Song for Louise"	New Talent of the Year	Won
1989	"Cloncurry Cattle Song"	Male Vocalist of the Year	Won
1990	"Kimberley Moon"	APRA Song of the Year	Won
1990	"Kimberley Moon"	Male Vocalist of the Year	Won
1991	"Blue Heeler"	APRA Song of the Year	Won
1991	"Age of Grace"	Male Vocalist of the Year	Won
1993	This Road	Top Selling album of the Year	Won
1993	"Way Out West" (with James Reyne)	Vocal Group or Duo of the Year	Won
1994	Touch of Water	Top Selling album of the Year	Won
2007	himself	Hands of Fame Inductee	imprint
2019	himself	Australian Roll of Renown	inducted

=== Mo Awards ===
The Australian Entertainment Mo Awards (commonly known informally as the Mo Awards), were annual Australian entertainment industry awards. They recognise achievements in live entertainment in Australia from 1975 to 2016. James Blundell won one award in that time.

Year	Nominee / work	Award	Result (wins only)
1989	James Blundell	Male Country Entertainer of the Year	Won

=== Queensland Music Awards ===
The Queensland Music Awards (previously known as Q Song Awards) are annual awards celebrating Queensland, Australia's brightest emerging artists and established legends. They commenced in 2006.

Year	Nominee / work	Award	Result (wins only)
2011	"Move into the City"	Country Song of the Year	Won
2024	James Blundell	Grant McLennan Lifetime Achievement Award	awarded

=== Tamworth Songwriters Awards ===
The Tamworth Songwriters Association (TSA) is an annual songwriting contest for original country songs, awarded in January at the Tamworth Country Music Festival. They commenced in 1986.

Year	Nominee / work	Award	Result (wins only)
1988	"Gidgee Pub Song" by James Blundell	Comedy/Novelty Song of the Year	Won
