= Motor's Too Fast =

1988 single by James Reyne

- CD single cover

Single by James Reyne

from the album James Reyne
- B-side: "Counting On Me"
- Released: June 1988
- Genre: Pop rock
- Label: Capitol
- Songwriters: James Reyne, Simon Hussey
- Producer: John Hudson

James Reyne singles chronology
"Heaven on a Stick" (1988)	"Motor's Too Fast" (1988)	"Always the Way" (1988)

"Motor's Too Fast" is a single from the Australian rock musician James Reyne. It was included on the international and Australian 1988 re-release of his debut self titled solo studio album. It was the fifth single taken from the album overall.

"Motor's Too Fast" provided Reyne a nomination for Best Male Artist at the ARIA Music Awards of 1989. It lost to Barnestorming by Jimmy Barnes. The Chantoozies covered the song on their self-titled debut album but titled their cover "Slightest Notion".

== Track listings ==
CD Single/ 7”

1. "Motor's Too Fast" - 3:34
2. "Counting on Me" -

Vinyl / 12"

- A1 Motor's Too Fast
- A2 Mr. Sandman (Live)
- B1 Heaven On A Stick (Live)
- B2 Counting On Me (Live)

== Charts ==
=== Weekly charts ===
Chart (1988)	Peak position
Australia (ARIA)	6
New Zealand (Recorded Music NZ)	26

=== Year-end chart ===
Chart (1988)	Position
Australian Singles (ARIA)	48
Australian Artist Singles (ARIA)	8

== Credits ==
- Bass – Andy Cichon
- Drums – John Watson
- Guitar – Brett Kingman, Jef Scott
- Keyboards – Simon Hussey
