= One More River (song) =

- CD single cover

Single by James Reyne

from the album Hard Reyne
- A-side: "One More River"
- B-side: "Jim Dandy"
- Released: 10 July 1989
- Genre: Pop/Rock
- Label: Capitol Records
- Songwriter(s): James Reyne,
- Producer(s): John Hudson, Simon Hussey

James Reyne singles chronology
"House of Cards" (1989)	"One More River" (1989)	"Trouble in Paradise" (1989)

"One More River" is the second single from Australian rock musician James Reyne’s second studio album Hard Reyne, released in 1989. It peaked at number 22 in Australia in August 1989.

== Track listings ==
Cassette Single/ 7”

1. "One More River" - 4:01
2. "Jim Dandy”

CD Single

1. "One More River"
2. "Jim Dandy"
3. "Wake Up Deadman"

== Charts ==
Chart (1989)	Peak position
Australia (ARIA)	22
