= Way Out West (song) =

1973 song by the Dingoes

Single by the Dingoes

from the album The Dingoes
- Released: October 1973
- Length: 3:15
- Label: Mushroom
- Songwriter(s): The Dingoes
- Producer(s): The Dingoes; John French

The Dingoes singles chronology
"Way Out West" (1973)	"Boy on the Run" (1974)

"Way Out West" is the debut single by Australian band the Dingoes. It was released in October 1973 and peaked in the top 40 of the Australian Kent Music Report singles chart, reaching number 26 in Melbourne. The song became the band's signature tune.

== Lyrics ==
The song explains the life of mining in Australia, telling the story of a man who has left his job and wife in the city to work for a company drilling for oil and enjoys "living and a working on the land".

== Charts ==
Chart (1973)	Peak position
Australia (Kent Music Report)	40

== James Blundell and James Reyne version ==
"Way Out West"

Single by James Blundell and James Reyne

from the album This Road and The Best
- Released: March 1992
- Studio: Metropolis (Melbourne, Australia)
- Length: 4:03
- Label: EMI
- Songwriter(s): The Dingoes
- Producer(s): James Reyne

James Reyne singles chronology
"Some People" (1992)	"Way Out West" (1992)	"Red Light Avenue" (1994)

Australian country artists James Blundell and James Reyne covered the song and released it as a single in 1992. Their version became a hit in Australia the same year, peaking at number two on the ARIA Singles Chart. It was the highest-charting single for both singers. Their version set in the key of G. At the APRA Music Awards of 1992, the song won Country Song of the Year.

=== Chart performance ===
"Way Out West" debuted at number 28 on 29 March 1992. The next week, it entered the top 10, then reached its peak of number two on 26 April. It remained in the top 10 for four more weeks and the top 50 for a further three weeks.

=== Track listing ===
CD and cassette single

1. James Blundell and James Reyne – "Way Out West" (3:59)
2. James Blundell – "She Won't Let You Down" (3:08)
3. James Reyne – "Long Yard Rider" (1:54)

=== Credits and personnel ===
Credits are lifted from the Australian CD single and The Best liner notes.

Studios

- Recorded at Metropolis Studios (Melbourne, Australia)
- Mixed at Studios 301 (Sydney, Australia)

Personnel

- The Dingoes – writing
- James Blundell – vocals
- James Reyne – vocals, acoustic guitar, production, arrangement
- Paul Gildea – guitars
- Mark Punch – additional guitar
- Brett Goldsmith – bass
- Lee Borkman – keyboards
- Davey Porter – drums
- Justin Brady – harmonica
- Garth Porter – mixing
- Ted Howard – mixing
- Doug Brady – engineering

=== Charts ===
==== Weekly charts ====
Chart (1992)	Peak position
Australia (ARIA)	2

==== Year-end charts ====
Chart (1992)	Position
Australia (ARIA)	22

=== Certifications ===
Region	Certification	Certified units/sales
Australia (ARIA)	Gold	35,000^{^}
^{^} Shipments figures based on certification alone.

== Other versions ==
Adam Brand and the Outlaws covered the song on the 2016 album Adam Brand and the Outlaws.

James Reyne and Ella Hooper released a version in 2023.
