= Liberation Records =

American record company

Liberation Records is an American record company based in the Los Angeles area known for do it yourself ethos and pioneering guerrilla marketing strategies. It was formed by then 16-year-old underground rock music fanzine publisher David Taba in 1994 out of his residence, simply as a hobby.

The label notably discovered and released the debut album of Home Grown but was best known for releasing compilation albums credited with advancing the careers of several young artists. The most memorable of the compilations, Punk Sucks and Ska Sucks, included tracks from then little known punk, pop-punk, and ska artists who would soon rise to fame internationally, including Sublime, Blink 182, Dance Hall Crashers, Less Than Jake, Hepcat, Millencolin, The Pietasters, Good Riddance, 88 Fingers Louie, The Bouncing Souls and Pennywise. The label has also released the cult classic "When Pregnasaurs Ruled the Earth" by Donuts N' Glory and reissued albums from Less Than Jake, The Queers, Screeching Weasel, The Vindictives, and Frenzal Rhomb, among others.

In the late 1990s, the label also spun off the indie rock and post-hardcore imprint New American Dream, which released music by the Icarus Line, Discount, Kind of Like Spitting, and Ink & Dagger.

== See also ==
- List of record labels
