= Hammerhead (James Reyne song) =

- CD single cover

Single by James Reyne

from the album James Reyne
- A-side: "Hammerhead"
- B-side: "Coin in a Plate” / "Burning Wood"
- Released: September 1987
- Genre: Pop/Rock
- Label: Capitol Records
- Songwriters: James Reyne, Simon Hussey
- Producers: Davitt Sigerson, John Hudson

James Reyne singles chronology
"Fall of Rome" (1987)	"Hammerhead" (1987)	"Rip it Up" (1987)

"Hammerhead" is the second single from Australian rock musician James Reyne’s debut self-titled solo studio album, released in 1987. The track featured uncredited backing vocals by Olivia Newton-John.

Reyne reflected on the song saying: ""Hammerhead" was not necessarily about me, but let's say I thought I knew what I was talking about. I wrote it with Simon Hussey; the music Simon and I wrote together and I wrote the lyrics. From memory it seemed to come quite easily. I shouldn't make too much about the fact that it's about drugs. It can be taken many ways. It was an exercise in trying to write a song about that subject but to also make it that it could be about a relationship. It's a song about a relationship. And whether that relationship is with a substance or a person, it's an obsessive relationship".

== Track listings ==
CD / Cassette Single

1. "Hammerhead" - 4:46
2. "Coin in a Plate" - 4:14

7" Promo Single

1. "Hammerhead" (7" Edit) - 4:19
2. "Burning Wood" - 2:43

== Charts ==
=== Weekly charts ===
Chart (1987)	Peak position
Australia (Australian Music Report)	8

=== Year-end charts ===
Chart (1987)	Position
Australia (Australian Music Report)	71
