= Slave (James Reyne song) =

1991 single by James Reyne

- CD single cover

Single by James Reyne

from the album Electric Digger Dandy
- B-side: "Outback Woman"; "I Will Walk Beside You"
- Released: 29 April 1991
- Length: 4:09
- Label: Virgin
- Songwriters: James Reyne; Jim Vallance
- Producer: Simon Hussey

James Reyne singles chronology
"Trouble in Paradise" (1989)	"Slave" (1991)	"Any Day Above Ground" (1991)

"Slave" is the first single from Australian rock musician James Reyne's third studio album, Electric Digger Dandy. Released in April 1991, the song peaked at number 10 in Australia that June.

== Track listings ==
CD and 7-inch single

1. "Slave" (James Reyne, Jim Vallance)
2. "Outback Woman"

12-inch single

A1. "Slave"
B1. "Outback Woman" (Reyne, Tony Joe White)
B2. "I Will Walk Beside You" (Reyne, Simon Hussey)

== Weekly charts ==
Chart (1991)	Peak position
Australia (ARIA)	10
