= Fall of Rome (song) =

1987 single by James Reyne

Single by James Reyne

from the album James Reyne
- B-side: "The Traveller"
- Released: August 1987
- Label: Capitol
- Songwriter(s): James Reyne
- Producer(s): Davitt Sigerson

James Reyne singles chronology
"R.O.C.K." (1985)	"Fall of Rome" (1987)	"Hammerhead" (1987)

"Fall of Rome" is the first single from Australian rock musician James Reyne's self-titled debut solo studio album (1987).

== Background and promotion ==
Reyne was the lead singer of Australian rock band Australian Crawl, who played their final show at the Perth Entertainment Centre on 1 February 1986. Following this, Reyne began work on his solo career. Reyne performed "Fall of Rome" on the final episode of iconic TV series Countdown on 19 July 1987.

== Track listings ==
7-inch and CD single

1. "Fall of Rome" (edit) – 3:44
2. "The Traveller" – 4:18

12-inch single

A1. "Fall of Rome" (rock mix by Mike Ging) – 5:52
A2. "The Traveller" – 4:18
B1. "Fall of Rome" (edited version) – 3:42
B2. "Fall of Rome" (instrumental) – 5:25

== Charts ==
=== Weekly charts ===
Chart (1987)	Peak position
Australia (Australian Music Report)	5
New Zealand (Recorded Music NZ)	33

=== Year-end charts ===
Chart (1987)	Position
Australia (Australian Music Report)	30
