= Celebrity Dog School =

Australian Reality Series

- Starring: Larry Emdur (host)
- Country of origin: Australia
- No. of episodes: 3

Production
- Executive producer: Paul Leadon
- Running time: 60 minutes (including commercials)

Original release
- Network: Network Ten
- Release: 18 February – 3 March 2007

Celebrity Dog School was a short-lived Australian reality series which aired on Network Ten. It was based on the original version aired in the UK. The show was hosted by Larry Emdur, who also hosted The Price is Right on the Nine Network, and Wheel of Fortune on the Seven Network. It was a Pett Productions format for BBC Worldwide, produced by Freehand Group Pty Limited.

== Format ==
The show involved six celebrities and their dogs given an obedience task, an agility task, and they must train them throughout the week. At the end of the week, they would perform these tasks in front of the other celebrities and the expert judges.

Home viewers had the option to vote for their favourite celebrity and dog pair via text message, with proceeds from each vote going to the RSPCA.

Towards the end of the series, there was to be a 'Grand Final Best in Show Spectacular' where they were to perform in front of a live audience. The most popular couple who was not eliminated would have won the 'Best in Series'. Bootsie scored a perfect score from all three judges; sadly, no such thing happened. After only three episodes, Network Ten placed the show on 'hiatus', and although the network ran trailers indicating the show was 'returning soon', it ended up never returning at all.

== Celebrities ==
The six celebrities in the show included:

- Kim Watkins – Co-host of 9am with David and Kim and host of Saving Babies, which both aired on Network Ten
- Robert 'Dipper' DiPierdomenico – AFL legend
- Ajay Rochester – Host of The Biggest Loser, which also aired on Network Ten
- Adam Richard – Comedian
- Michael Bevan – Ex Australian Cricketer
- Bianca Dye – Nova 96.9 radio host

== Expert Judges ==
The expert judges on Celebrity Dog School were Steve Austin, who is Australia's premier dog trainer, and Dr Julie Summerfield, who is a qualified veterinarian and is currently the resident vet in the program 9am with David and Kim.

== See also ==
- Pooch Perfect
