= Ally Fowler =

Australian actress and singer

- Born: Alexandra Fowler; 6 December 1961 (age 64); Adelaide, South Australia, Australia
- Occupations: Actress, singer
- Years active: 1982–present
- Known for: Sons and Daughters as Angela Hamilton Palmer Keegan (327 episodes)
- Musical career
- Genre: Pop music
- Instrument: Vocalist
- Formerly of: Chantoozies

Alexandra Fowler (born 6 December 1961) is an Australian actress and singer. She is known for her roles as Angela Hamilton in Sons and Daughters (1982–1984), Zoe Davis in Neighbours (1986) and Lauren Allen in Big Sky (1997). She was also a member of 1980s Australian pop group, Chantoozies.

== Career ==
Fowler was born in Adelaide in 1961, her father was a television executive, who served with the production firm the Grundy Organisation

She had small roles in The Young Doctors and Sara Dane,.

She was working at an Adelaide vegetarian restaurant as a waitress whilst playing a golfer in the film Bondi Blue, hoping to break into showbiz, when a year later she was given the role and rose to prominence playing Angela Hamilton (later Palmer Keegan) in the Grundy series Sons and Daughters from 1982 and 1984, through 327 episodes.

She joined the cast of Neighbours as Zoe Davis in 1986, after being approached by the Grundy Organisation. After deciding not to extend her contract with the serial, Fowler departed in September 1986. She also played a regular role in another Grundy soap Possession (1985) just before it was cancelled. She also appeared in The Flying Doctors and Frankie's House. From 1997, she was a regular lead in Big Sky, alongside actor Gary Sweet.

On 24 August 2001, she appeared on the Australian-American science fiction series Farscape in the episode "Fractures", as the voice of Orrhn. From 15 November 2005 to 2007, she played the recurring role of Eve Ballantyne on the Australian drama series All Saints.

From June 2013, Fowler began appearing in the first season of Wentworth as Simone "Simmo" Slater and continued in the role through to season 2, episode 6. She reappeared as Slater in season 3, episode 12 in a cameo role. Fowler rejoined the cast of Neighbours in late 2015 as Nene Williams.

In 2022, Fowler joined the cast of miniseries Riptide. Fowler in 2024 gave an extensive interview with the podcast Talking Prisoner, talking about her time on Wentworth, Sons and Daughters and All Saints.

=== Music ===
As a singer, Fowler is known as one of the four female vocalists of the band Chantoozies (1986–1991), which also included David Reyne. The other three females were Tottie Goldsmith, Eve von Bibra and Angelica La Bozzetta.

Their first single was a number four hit with a cover version of "Witch Queen" in March 1987. The group had continued success with further singles, including a number six hit with "Wanna Be Up" (May 1988), and top 40 peaks for "He's Gonna Step on You Again" (June 1987, No. 36), "Kiss 'n' Tell" (August 1988, No. 25) and "Love the One You're With" (March 1991, No. 21).

Their debut self-titled album Chantoozies, reached number 8 on the ARIA Albums Chart in September 1988. Their follow-up album Gild the Lily peaked at number 71 in April 1991.

After the group disbanded Fowler returned to acting, with roles in Big Sky (1997), All Saints (2005–2007) and Wentworth (2013–2014). From 2012 she has also participated in reunion gigs with Chantoozies. They released a single, "Baby It's You", in April 2014.

== Filmography ==
=== Television ===
Year	Title	Role	Notes
1982–1984	Sons and Daughters	Angela Hamilton	327 episodes
1985	Possession	Nicola Shannon	3 episodes
1986	Neighbours	Zoe Davis	Regular role, 163 episodes
1988	The Flying Doctors	Josie	1 episode
1991	G.P.	Mischa	1 episode
1992	Frankie's House	Kate	TV movie
1994	Law of the Land	Jacqui Rushcutter	13 episodes
1996	Cody: The Burnout	Stella	TV movie
1997	Big Sky	Lauren Allen	40 episodes
1999	Die Millennium-Katastrophe – Computer-Crash 2000		TV movie
1999	Heartbreak High	Katherine	2 episodes
2001	Farscape	Orrhn	1 episode
2001	Head Start	Felice	2 episodes
2001–2002	Backberner	Julie	2 episodes
2005	The Secret Life of Us	Susie	1 episode
2005–2007	All Saints	Eve Ballantyne / Juliette	29 episodes
2006	Stepfather of the Bride	Pamela	TV movie
2008	Scorched	Kate Langmore	TV movie
2013–2015	Wentworth	Simone Slater	9 episodes
2016	Neighbours	Nene Williams	18 episodes
2022	Riptide	Rachel Weston	4 episodes
2024	White Fever	Llewellyn	2 episodes

=== Film ===
Year	Title	Role	Notes
2004	Love in the First Degree	Jill	Film

== Stage ==
Year	Title	Role	Notes
1996	The Rocky Horror Show	Janet	Burswood Showroom, Perth
2002	The Vagina Monologues	Various	Adrian Bohm Productions
2009	The Little Dog Laughed	Diane	Ensemble Theatre, Sydney
2012	Let the Sunshine	Natasha	Riverside Theatres Parramatta, Nautilus Theatre, Port Lincoln, Middleback Theatre, Whyalla, Northern Festival Centre, Port Pirie, Hopgood Theatre, Noarlunga Centre, Sir Robert Helpmann Theatre, Mt Gambier, Chaffey Theatre, Renmark with HIT Productions
2012	Rhinestone Rex	Monica	Ensemble Theatre, Sydney
2014	Face to Face	Maureen	The Concourse, Sydney with Ensemble Theatre, Sydney
2014	A Conversation	Lorin	The Concourse, Sydney with Ensemble Theatre, Sydney
2014	Charitable Intent	Stella	The Concourse, Sydney with Ensemble Theatre, Sydney
2017	Shrine	Mary	Fortyfivedownstairs, Melbourne with The Kin Collective
2018	Lottie in the Late Afternoon	Anne	Fortyfivedownstairs, Melbourne
2019	Boojum!	Winter School	Dunstan Playhouse, Adelaide with State Opera of South Australia

== Music videos ==
Year	Artist	Title
1987	Chantoozies	"Witch Queen"
1987	Chantoozies	"He's Gonna Step On You Again"
1988	Chantoozies	"Wanna Be Up"
1988	Chantoozies	"Kiss 'n'Tell"
1989	Chantoozies	"Come Back to Me"
1990	Chantoozies	"Walk On"
1991	Chantoozies	"Love the One You’re With"
1991	Chantoozies	"I'll Be There"
2014	Chantoozies	"Baby It's You"
2015	Chantoozies	"Black and Blue"
2016	Client Liaison	"Wild Life"
