= Chantoozies =

Australian pop group

- Origin: Melbourne, Victoria, Australia
- Genre: Pop
- Years active: 1986–1992; 1998; 2006; 2012–present
- Label: Mushroom
- Members: Ally Fowler; Eve von Bibra; Tim Henwood; Vashti Sivell; Will Dickens
- Past members: Angelica La Bozzetta; Brett Goldsmith; David Reyne; Frank McCoy; Scott Griffiths; Tottie Goldsmith
- Website: thechantoozies.com

Chantoozies are an Australian pop band, formed in 1986. The group featured four female vocalists: Eve von Bibra, Angie La Bozzetta, Ally Fowler and Tottie Goldsmith, and four male musicians: Brett Goldsmith (bass guitars, keyboards, programming), Scott Griffiths (keyboards, programming), Frank McCoy (guitars, vocals) and David Reyne (drums, backing vocals). Their name is an intentional mispronunciation of the French word for a female singer, "chanteuse".

Chantoozies' first single, "Witch Queen", was released on Mushroom Records in January 1987 and peaked at number 4 on the Australian singles chart. The group went on to sell 300,000 records, achieving Gold and Platinum status throughout the '80s and '90s in Australia.

In early 2014, the Chantoozies released their first single in 23 years, a cover of Promises' "Baby It's You". It was produced by Pseudo Echo frontman Brian Canham. The video co-starred Australian actors Hugh Jackman, Anthony LaPaglia and Eric Bana.

== History ==
=== Pre Chantoozies ===
- David Reyne had been drummer for Clutch Cargo (included his brother James Reyne), which became Australian Crawl in late 1978. David Reyne had left before they recorded any material, and continued his acting education. He was also drummer for Cats Under Pressure with Simon Hussey (guitars, keyboards) and Mark Grieg (guitars) in 1984. Reyne also acted on the 1980s television series, Sweet and Sour and Possession.
- Frank McCoy had played in a number of bands, including The Stockings (with Bernie Lynch and Boris Falovic), rockabilly outfits The Crackajacs and El Prezzos, country bands the Chaff Bandits, Crummy Cowboys and Hang em High (with Ed Bates, Quentin Frayne and Andrew Forrer). Also the Bitch Magnets with Brett Goldsmith and the Reyne brothers and The Real McCoys.
- Brett Goldsmith had been in Wayback 5 during 1986, which included Kate Ceberano as a vocalist.
- Ally Fowler and Eve von Bibra were actors in a 1980s television soap opera, Sons and Daughters; Fowler also appeared on Neighbours, All Saints and Big Sky.
- Tottie Goldsmith acted in the television soap operas/dramas The Henderson Kids, The Young Doctors, Starting Out, Neighbours and Prisoner.
- Angelica ('Angie') Arnott (née La Bozzetta) appeared on the television series Special Squad.

=== 1986–1992: Chantoozies to Gild the Lily ===
Chantoozies formed as a good-time covers band to play at Tottie Goldsmith's 24th birthday party. The band's debut club gig attracted 600 people, which was encouragement enough for the musicians to continue and the group signed a record deal with Mushroom Records. In January 1987, the group released their debut single: a cover of Redbone's "Witch Queen", which peaked at number 4 on the national singles chart. The second single was a cover of John Kongos' "He's Gonna Step on You Again" and was released in June 1987, vying with The Party Boys' hard rock version of the same song for a place on the charts simultaneously. The Chantoozies' version peaked at number No. 36. Chantoozies' third single, "Wanna Be Up", written by Brett Goldsmith and von Bibra, was released in May 1988 and peaked at number 6 on the national singles chart in July 1988. "Kiss'n' Tell", was released in September 1988 and peaked at No. 25 in November. By that time, Greg Millikan had replaced Griffiths on keyboards. Chantoozies toured with James Reyne and Daryl Braithwaite, supporting their self-titled, top ten debut studio album released in August 1988.

In 1989, Griffiths and Tottie Goldsmith left the band. Griffiths was replaced by Greg Millikan. That November, the group released "Come Back to Me". In October 1990, the group released "Walk On", and their version of The Angels' "My Boyfriend's Back" was included on the soundtrack of the 1990 film The Crossing.

In February 1991, The Chantoozies released a cover of Stephen Stills' "Love the One You're With" as the second single from their second studio album. The song peaked at number 21 on the singles chart. In April, The Chantoozies released their sophomore album, Gild the Lily. A cover of Jackson 5's "I'll Be There" was released later in 1991, before the group disbanded.

=== Post Chantoozies ===
- Eve von Bibra returned to acting with roles on mid-1990s TV with Time Trax and The Damnation of Harvey McHugh; and more recently as Jackie in the 2006 film Kenny. She has also worked on TV shows as an artist co-ordinator for RocKwiz (2007–2012) and assisting production for Angry Boys (2011) and Outland (2012). In November 2008 on RocKwiz, von Bibra appeared as a guest contestant and performed her solo rendition of "Love the One You're With" and a duet with Jed Kurzel (The Mess Hall) for a cover of Bee Gees hit "To Love Somebody".
- Angelica La Bozzetta was the first actress to play Natalie Nash in Home and Away, and also appeared on 1990s episodes of Blue Heelers and Big Sky; and more recently in 2003 film The Rage in Placid Lake.
- Ally Fowler also returned to TV with 1990s Cody and Big Sky; and since 2005 as a regular on All Saints.
- Brett Goldsmith continued as a singer-songwriter and performer; also as a hospitality venue developer and more recently as a fashion photographer.
- Tottie Goldsmith left Chantoozies in 1989, before the recording of their second album, and undertook a solo singing career. She then returned to TV as host of Sex/Life in the mid-1990s; acting during the 2000s included Stingers, Blue Heelers and Life. As of January 2022, Goldsmith appears on I'm a Celebrity Australia.
- David Reyne left early in 1990 and continued with his acting on television on Bony (1990), The Flying Doctors (1988–1994), and then as a presenter on Getaway (1992–2006) and 9am with David and Kim (2006–2009).
- Scott Griffiths supplied keyboards and synthesisers for Sir Piers' 2003 release "Don't You Love Me".
- Frank McCoy continued playing around Melbourne and fronted The Real McCoys (Tony Thornton, drums, Mark Ferrie, bass, Justin Brady, harp and Mark Frayne, guitar), most remembered for their late-night gig at Inflation Nightclub where a host of local and international musicians regularly sat in with the band. He formed a duo, Cheese and Greens, a guitaroke outfit with BBQ Bob Wilson.

In 1998, Fowler, von Bibra and LaBozzetta performed "Wanna Be Up" as the Chantoozies at the Mushroom 25 concert, to celebrate the 25th anniversary of Mushroom Records.

All four female lead vocalists briefly re-formed Chantoozies for the June to August 2006 Countdown Spectacular Tour, where they performed "Wanna Be Up".

=== 2012–present: Reformation ===
In 2012 the Chantoozies traveled to Adelaide to perform alongside Leo Sayer, Mondo Rock, Uncanny X-Men and Pseudo Echo at the Adelaide Clipsal 500. They played alongside Rick Astley on his Australian Tour and also performed at the 2012 Carols by Candlelight at the Myer Music Bowl as part of the ‘Legends of Rock’. On 25 April 2014, The Chantoozies released their first new recording in 23 years, a cover of the Promises hit "Baby It's You". In May 2015 the group became a trio after the departure of LaBozzetta (now Angela Arnott) due to family reasons. On 17 July 2019 they performed on the second day of the Big Red Bash at Birdsville, Queensland.

Tottie Goldsmith left the Chantoozies for the second time in February 2020, reducing the group to a duo of Fowler and von Bibra. Later that year, they released Compilation, a compilation of most of the singles from their albums (excluding "Come Back"), album track "Slightest Notion", the non-album track "I'll Be There" and most of their post-reformation non-album singles (sans "Black and Blue"), as well as a new song entitled "No Fool for You", which would be released as a single on its own the following year. This was followed up with "Every Night" in early 2023.

On 26 July 2025, Tottie returned to the Chantoozies to fill in for Fowler, who was busy with other commitments, at a gig at the Sandstone Point Hotel on the Sunshine Coast.

== Discography ==
=== Albums ===
List of studio albums, with selected chart positions
Title	Album details	Peak chart positions
Title	Album details	AUS
Chantoozies	Released: 22 August 1988; Label: Mushroom Records (93279); Format(s): Vinyl, CD, Cassette	8
Gild the Lily	Released: 15 April 1991; Label: Mushroom Records (L 30249); Format(s): Vinyl, CD, Cassette	71

=== Compilation albums ===
List of compilation albums
Title	Details
The Chantoozies Compilation	Released: 19 June 2023; Label: The Chantoozies; Format: CD, digital

=== Singles ===
List of singles with selected chart positions
Year	Title	Peak chart positions	Album
Year	Title	AUS	Album
1987	"Witch Queen"	4	Chantoozies
1987	"He's Gonna Step on You Again"	36	Chantoozies
1988	"Wanna Be Up"	6	Chantoozies
1988	"Kiss 'n' Tell"	25	Chantoozies
1989	"Come Back to Me"	72	Gild the Lily
1990	"Walk On"	96	Gild the Lily
1991	"Love the One You're With"	21	Gild the Lily
1991	"I'll Be There"	167	Non-album singles
2014	"Baby It's You"	—	Non-album singles
2015	"Black and Blue"	—	Non-album singles
2019	"Take Me in Your Arms"	—	Non-album singles
2021	"No Fool for You"	—	Compilation
2023	"Every Night"	—	Non-album single
