= Kiss 'n' Tell (Chantoozies song) =

- 7" single cover

Single by Chantoozies

from the album Chantoozies
- B-side: "Want to Go"
- Released: 26 September 1988
- Studio: Platinum Studios, Melbourne
- Genre: Synth pop, electronic, pop
- Length: 4:05
- Label: Mushroom
- Songwriters: Eve von Bibra; Brett Goldsmith
- Producer: Ian McKenzie

Chantoozies singles chronology
"Wanna Be Up" (1988)	"Kiss 'n' Tell" (1988)	"Come Back to Me" (1989)

Music video
- "Kiss 'n' Tell" on YouTube

"Kiss 'n' Tell" is a song written by Eve von Bibra and Brett Goldsmith and recorded by Australian pop group the Chantoozies. The song was released in September 1988 as the fourth and final single from their self-titled debut album (1988). The song peaked at number 25 in Australia, becoming the group's fourth consecutive top 40 single.

== Track listings ==
7" single (K 620)

- Side A "Kiss 'n' Tell" - 4:05
- Side B "Want to Go"

12" single (X 13332)

- Side A "Kiss 'n' Tell" (12" version)
- Side B "Want to Go"

== Charts ==
Chart (1988)	Peak position
Australia (ARIA)	25
