= Tottie Goldsmith =

Australian actress, singer (born 1962)

Tottie Goldsmith OAM
- Goldsmith in 2025
- Born: Caroline Goldsmith; 27 August 1962 (age 64); Melbourne, Victoria, Australia
- Occupations: Actress; singer
- Years active: 1982–present
- Spouse: Steven Lee (divorced)
- Children: 1
- Relatives: Olivia Newton-John (aunt); Brett Goldsmith (brother); Emerson Newton-John (half-brother)
- Website: tottiegoldsmith.com.au

Caroline "Tottie" Goldsmith OAM (born 27 August 1962) is an Australian actress and singer, known for her roles as Trixie Sheldon in Starting Out, Toni Sheffield in The Young Doctors, Marilyn "Tex" Perez in Fire, and Cassandra Freedman in Neighbours. She hosted the Network Ten program Sex/Life in 1996, and was a contestant on I'm a Celebrity...Get Me Out of Here! in 2022. In addition to her film and television work, Goldsmith is a founding member of the Chantoozies, a pop group formed in 1986.

== Early life ==
Goldsmith was born Caroline Goldsmith, but her family dubbed her Tottie or Totty when she was around eight months old. Goldsmith is the daughter of Melbourne restaurateur and nightclub owner Brian Goldsmith and British-born actress Rona Newton-John (1941–2013). Her great-grandfather, the father of her grandmother Irene, was German-British physicist, mathematician and Nobel Prize winner Max Born.

Olivia Newton-John was her maternal aunt, while bassist Brett Goldsmith is her elder brother and racecar driver Emerson Newton-John her half brother. She has six other siblings.

Goldsmith was not sure she wanted to pursue an acting career. She attended a couple of acting schools, but she said that she "never really got settled." However, she felt able to be herself and really enjoyed her appearance in the Playbox Theatre production of When Lips Collide, saying "that was when the bug hit me."

== Career ==
=== Television ===
In the early 1980s, Goldsmith acted in the Australian television series The Young Doctors as Toni Sheffield, Starting Out as Trixie Sheldon, Prisoner, Saturdee, and The Henderson Kids . She made a guest appearance on a 1989 episode of Mission: Impossible, which was filmed in Australia. She also guested in G.P. and Embassy.

During 1996, Goldsmith starred as Marilyn "Tex" Perez in the second season of drama series Fire. She also hosted Sex/Life, a Network Ten program about sexual health, and appeared in Twisted Tales and soap spoof Shark Bay. She was also a panellist on such programs as Beauty and the Beast and All-Star Squares.

Goldsmith made various guest appearances on Australian TV shows in the 2000s, including The Secret Life of Us, Bert's Family Feud, Big Questions, Surprise Surprise Gotcha, Pizza and Celebrity Singing Bee, and had a three episode run on Blue Heelers. Goldsmith appeared in a 2001 episode of Stingers, followed by another appearance in 2004.

In 2009, Goldsmith appeared in the television soap opera Neighbours for three months as Cassandra Freedman. She acted in two episodes of the Australian television show Swift and Shift Couriers. She appeared in the 2010 Australian film, Ricky! The Movie, as the ex-girlfriend of Ricky T, and as a gangster's girlfriend in the 2011 television film Underbelly Files: Infiltration. She also had a supporting role in the 2012 Jack Irish telefilm Bad Debts.

In 2022, Goldsmith appeared on the 8th season of the Australian version of I'm a Celebrity...Get Me Out of Here!

=== Music ===
From 1986 Goldsmith was one of four female lead vocalists of the Australian band the Chantoozies. They released four singles: "Witch Queen", "He's Gonna Step On You Again", "Wanna Be Up", "Kiss and Tell", and an album, Chantoozies. Goldsmith left the Chantoozies to pursue a solo singing career before the band released their second album, Gild the Lily in 1991. She later rejoined when the group temporarily reformed in 2006 for the Countdown Spectacular concert series, and more permanently in 2012. She again left the band in 2020.

With Chantoozies member Eve von Bibra, Goldsmith also performed in the duo the Toozies. The Toozies performed the opening act at the 2010 Antenna Awards.

On 8 January 2023, Goldsmith returned to music after a 3-year break, performing in St. Kilda with the "3XY Allstars". 30 July that year would also see her invite former Chantoozies bandmate Ally Fowler to the stage to cover her aunt Olivia Newton-John's "You're the One That I Want", her first performance with a Chantoozie since leaving the band. She would also return to the Chantoozies at a concert at the Sandstone Point Hotel on the Sunshine Coast on 26 July, filling in for Fowler.

=== Other work ===
In the late 1990s, Goldsmith co-hosted a breakfast program on Melbourne radio station TTFM, replacing Nicky Buckley. She played Janet in a season of the New Rocky Horror Show, and participated in an arena version of the musical Grease.

Goldsmith works as a marriage celebrant and has released two meditation and relaxation albums, Unwind Your Mind (2004) and Falling Asleep (2005). After having a bout of chronic fatigue syndrome and struggling for years with sleep issues, Goldsmith used her meditation skills in partnership with sleep specialist Chris Bunney to record Falling Asleep, which has since been prescribed by doctors. In 2007, she collaborated with a child psychologist on A Sleep Story, which is aimed at children.

She was known as a sex symbol early in her career, and posed nude for art magazine Black+White in August 1996.

== Personal life ==
Goldsmith was married to skier Steven Lee and they have one child together, a daughter. She became engaged to businessman James Mayo in January 2008.

== Honours ==
In the 2020 Queen's Birthday Honours, Goldsmith was awarded the Medal of the Order of Australia (OAM) for "service to the community, and to the performing arts".

== Filmography ==
=== Film ===
Year	Title	Role	Notes
1994	The Intruder	Vicki	
2002	Signs of Life	Susan	
2003	Visitors	Casey	
2003	House of Bulger		
2010	Ricky! The Movie	Ricky's ex-girlfriend	
2011	The Fat Lady Swings	Scarlett	Short film
2014	Start Opinions Exit	The Oracle	
2014	Fat Pizza vs. Housos	Dino's Girlfriend	
2020	The Taverna	Rebecca	
2021	Rage	Elizabeth Bennett	

=== Television ===
Year	Title	Role	Notes
1983	The Young Doctors	Toni Sheffield	Series regular
1983	Starting Out	Trixie Sheldon	Series regular
1983	The Daryl Somers Show	Nurse	Guest
1984	Prisoner	Gloria Payne	Recurring
1984	Special Squad	Fiona	Episode: "Same Time Friday"
1985	The Henderson Kids	Glynnis Wheeler	Recurring
1986	Prime Time	Jamie	
1986	Saturdee	Maggie	10 episodes
1989	Mission: Impossible	Princess Elaine	Episode: "The Princess"
1990	G.P.	Bernadette Wentworth	Episode: "Border of the Heart"
1991	All Together Now	Charlie	Episode: "Look What They've Done to My Song"
1991	Pugwall	Miss Arnott	Episode: "Orange Crush"
1996	Fire	Firefighter Marilyn 'Tex' Perez	Series regular
1996	Sex/Life	Host	
1996	Twisted Tales	Vanessa Condor	Episode: "Bonus Mileage"
1996	Shark Bay		
1999	Law of the Land	Sarah	Episode: "Winner Take All"
2001	Stingers	Olivia Gibson	Episode: "Reunion"
2001–2003	Pizza	Kinky	2 episodes: "Melbourne Pizza", "Road Trip Pizza"
2004	Stingers	Rowena Wylie	Episode: "The Contract"
2004	Blue Heelers	Fay Tudor	3 episodes: "One of the Boys", "A Helping Hand", "Tit for Tat"
2005	The Secret Life of Us	Mrs Corman	Episode: "Rocks and Chameleons"
2005	Life	Anita	TV movie
2008	Canal Road	Natalie Banks	Episode: "1.4"
2008	Swift and Shift Couriers	Fashion Woman / Andrea Walsh	2 episodes: "Welcome to Swift and Shift, "The Safety Inspector"
2009	Neighbours	Cassandra Freedman	Recurring
2010	Satisfaction	Ava	Episode: "Staples, Guns and Roses"
2011	Underbelly Files: Infiltration	Sara Herlihy	TV movie
2011	Housos	Janelle	Episode: "Melbourne"
2012	Jack Irish: Bad Debts	Jackie Pixley	TV movie
2015	The Doctor Blake Mysteries	Jacqueline Maddern	Episode: "A Night to Remember"
2022	I'm a Celebrity...Get Me Out of Here!	Contestant	Season 8

== Theatre ==
Year	Title	Role	Notes
1981	When Lips Collide	Tanya	Playbox Theatre, Melbourne with St Martins Youth Arts Centre
1998	Grease	Miss Lynch	Adelaide, Melbourne Park, Sydney Entertainment Centre, Brisbane Entertainment Centre, Derwent Entertainment Centre, Tasmania, Mount Smart Stadium, New Zealand with Queensland Performing Arts Trust
2001	The Vagina Monologues		Melbourne Athenaeum
2013	Next Fall		Chapel Off Chapel, Melbourne with Fly on the Wall Theatre for Midsumma Festival
