= Larry Emdur =

Australian television personality

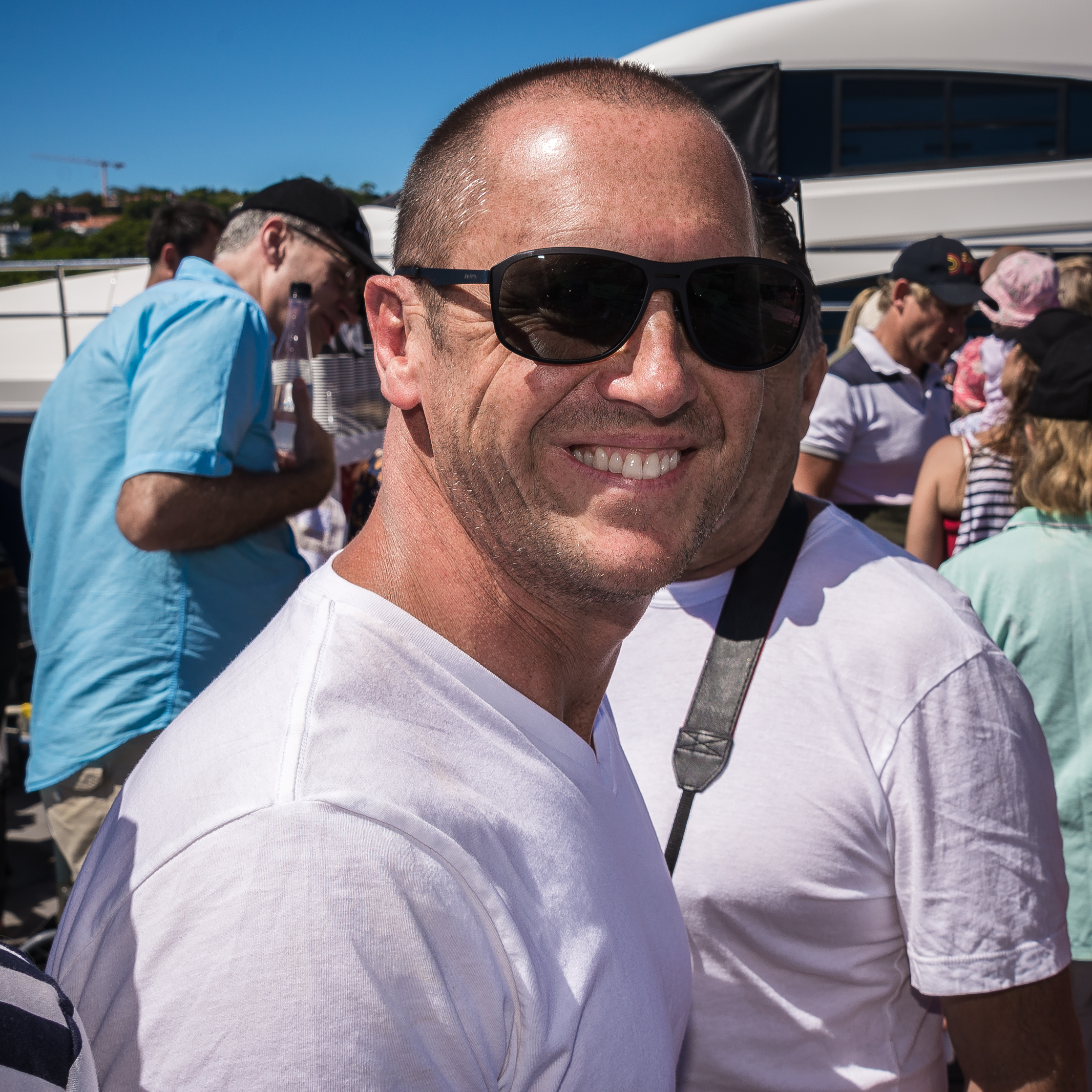
- Emdur in 2014
- Born: 9 December 1964 (age 61); Sydney, New South Wales, Australia
- Occupation: Television presenter
- Years active: 1979−present
- Employer: Seven Network
- Known for: The Morning Show (2007–present); The Chase Australia (2021–present)
- Notable credits: Good Morning Australia; The Price Is Right; Wheel of Fortune
- Spouse: Sylvie Emdur (m. 1994)
- Children: 2

Larry Emdur (born 9 December 1964) is an Australian Gold Logie award-winning television presenter.

Emdur is currently co-host of The Morning Show alongside Kylie Gillies, and host of The Chase Australia.

The duo also hosted the Australian version of Celebrity Splash!. Emdur hosted the Australian version of game show The Price Is Right on the Nine Network from 1993 to 1998, and from 2003 to 2005 and, then again, when the show returned to the Seven Network on 7 May 2012. The show was cancelled later that year.

Emdur is known to Australian audiences for hosting several other game shows, including Cash Bonanza (Nine Network), and Wheel of Fortune (Seven Network). Emdur hosted Hey Hey it's Saturday five times, once in 1994, twice in 1998, and twice, consecutively, in 1999, and substituted as host of It Takes Two, once in 2006 and again in 2007. He has also hosted Celebrity Dog School on Network Ten.

== Biography ==
=== Early life and career ===
Emdur grew up in a Jewish family near the beach in Bondi, New South Wales, and developed a keen interest in surfing from an early age. Dropping out of school at 15, Emdur began working as a copy boy at The Sydney Morning Herald, before moving into television, where, at the age of 19, he became Australia's youngest national newsreader, presenting the overnight news for Seven Network in Australia.

After some time as a reporter and newsreader in news and current affairs, and a presenter on Good Morning Australia, Emdur switched to hosting game shows and variety television.

== TV host career ==
Emdur debuted as host of a national primetime television show in 1989, aged 24, fronting 10 TV Australia's Family Double Dare. The show was an Australian version of the Nickelodeon franchise.

Emdur hosted of the local version The Price Is Right on the Nine Network, from 1993 to 1998, before its cancellation. It was revived on 23 June 2003 and ran until 24 November 2005, when it was again cancelled due to declining ratings and the high cost of production.

To commemorate the 40th season of the United States version in 2011–12, on a July 2011 trip to the United States, Emdur called down a contestant and served as a guest host for Cliff Hangers, under recommendation of host Drew Carey. Emdur also modelled a trip to Australia in one of the two showcases that are presented on the United States version. Emdur was one of numerous people who have hosted the format to appear as part of the 40th anniversary celebration.

Emdur filled in for Daryl Somers on the family show Hey Hey It's Saturday. After being "rested" by the Nine Network following the cancellation of The Price Is Right, Emdur became host of the Seven Network's Wheel of Fortune. His contract with Seven was signed hours after his deal with the Nine Network expired. While in the first few weeks of his run with Seven's Wheel in the 5:00 pm weekday timeslot, Emdur continued to appear simultaneously on Nine in re-runs of The Price Is Right, until Bert's Family Feud took over the 5:30 pm timeslot on Nine in mid-February 2006. On 19 June 2006, news emerged that Wheel of Fortune was to be cancelled at the end of the 2006 season. Channel 10's Rove Live then started a campaign to "Save Larry Emdur", although Seven soon put an end to Rove's jokes by issuing a statement that Emdur would be staying with the Seven Network.

Emdur has also been a fill-in host for It Takes Two and has filled in for Andrew O'Keefe on Weekend Sunrise and David Koch on Sunrise.

Emdur signed up with Network Ten in 2007. He had joined up to host a new show Celebrity Dog School, which began airing in February.

Emdur is currently co-hosting The Morning Show with Kylie Gillies, a morning talk show airing on the Seven Network, which began in mid-2007.

Emdur was invited to participate in the 2009 Sydney to Hobart Yacht Race by finance commentator Anthony Bell. Upon reaching Hobart, Emdur said on The Morning Show that he might never set foot on a boat again. However, in 2010, Emdur signed on to participate in the Sydney to Hobart again. His crew on the yacht Investec LOYAL finished second. On 4 February 2011, Emdur renewed his contract with the Seven Network, reportedly worth in excess of $800,000 a year. That contract stopped him from defecting to the Nine Network to co-host Today. The contract allowed him to stay on as co-host of The Morning Show and "other opportunities".

In February 2010, Seven announced that Emdur would co-host Weekend Sunrise on Saturday mornings, alongside Samantha Armytage, and he held that position until the end of 2010. Emdur has also been a regular fill-in co-host on Sunrise and Weekend Sunrise.

In September 2013, Emdur produced and hosted a pilot for a late night talk show titled Larry on Late in Sydney, which featured guests Guy Sebastian, Samantha Armytage and Manon Youdale. The Seven Network passed on the show after viewing the pilot.

In December 2013, Emdur was a crew member aboard racing supermaxi yacht Perpetual Loyal in the 2013 Sydney to Hobart Yacht Race, with other celebrity crew members, Karl Stefanovic, Guillaume Brahimi, Tom Slingsby, Phil Waugh and Jude Bolton.

In 2014, Emdur, and co-host of The Morning Show, Kylie Gillies, whose studio is across from the Sydney Lindt Cafe, were able to view and report on the events of the Martin Place siege as it unfolded, before transmission was handed over to the Seven Network Melbourne studios.

Emdur appeared in the fifteenth season of Dancing with the Stars.

In 2021, Seven Network announced that Emdur would be the new host of The Chase Australia, replacing Andrew O'Keefe, after the latter's contract was not renewed at the end of 2020, prior to his being charged over domestic violence in January 2021. However, according to reports, he was close to not renewing his contract with the Seven Network at the end of the previous year and was offered The Chase hosting role in a bid to keep him at the network. The episodes with Emdur as a host began airing on 26 July 2021, after the final episode of Andrew O'Keefe had aired on 20 July 2021.

In 2024, Emdur won the 2024 TV Week Gold Logie for Most Popular Personality on Australian Television

== Personal life ==
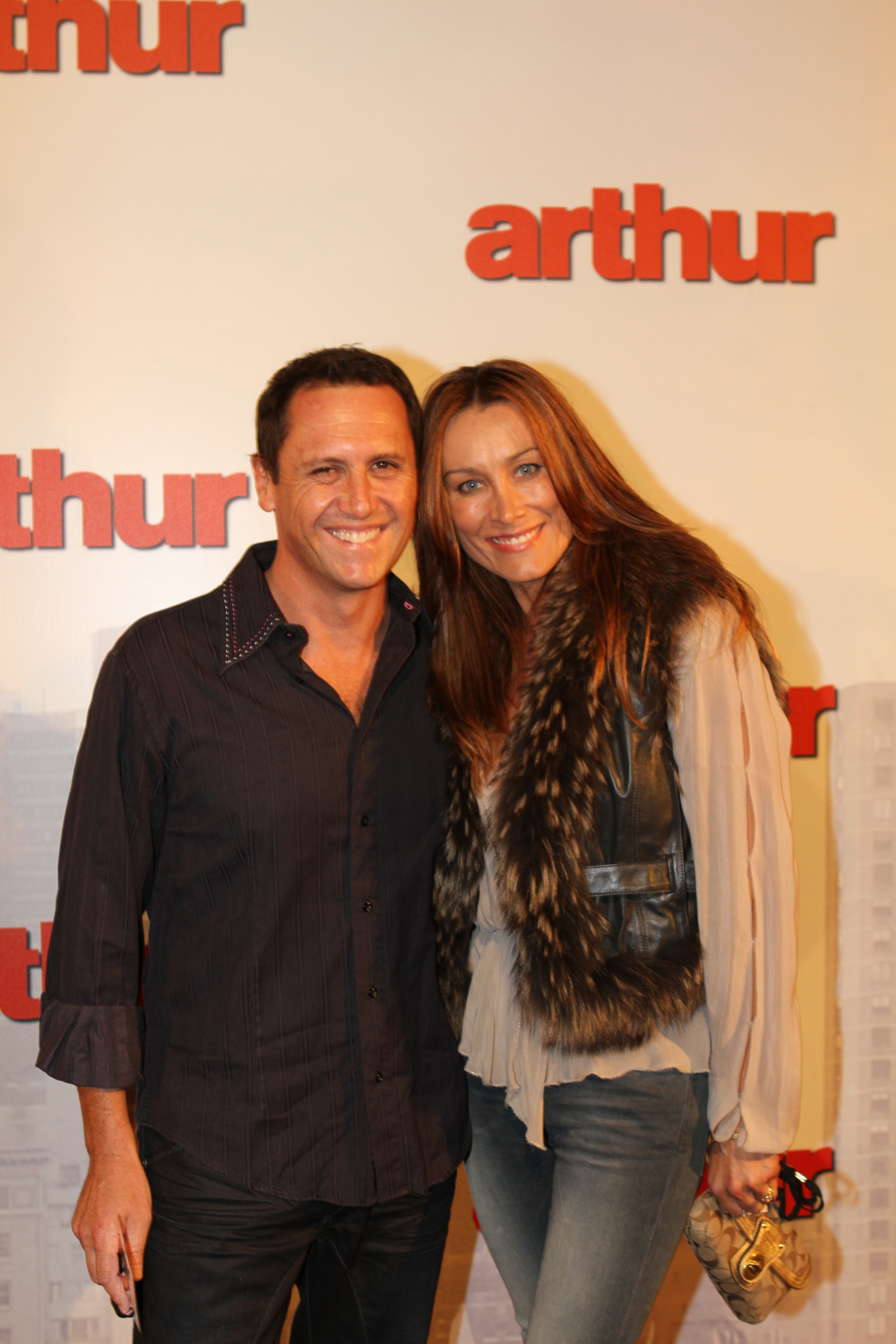
Larry Emdur and wife Sylvie

Emdur married his wife Sylvie on 5 December 1994. They have two children. He enjoys listening to music such as Neil Diamond who he is a big fan of.

== Filmography ==
Title	Year	Role
Family Double Dare (TV series)	1989	Host
The Main Event	1991	Host
The Price Is Right	1993–1998, 2003–2005, 2012	Host
Breaking News (TV series)	1994	Self
The Castle	1997	as Himself
Hey Hey, It's Saturday	1998	Host
Russell Gilbert Live (TV series)	2000	as Himself
Cash Bonanza (TV series)	2001	Host
Merrick and Rosso Unexplained	2003	Self - Voice
Australia Unites: Reach Out to Asia (TV special)	2005	as Himself
Good Morning Australia (TV series)	2005	Host
Rove Live (TV series)	2006	as Himself
Wheel of Fortune	2006	Host
Good as Gold!	2006	Host
9am with David and Kim (TV series)	2007	as Himself
Celebrity Dog School (TV series)	2007	Host
It Takes Two (TV series)	2006–2007	Guest host
Weekend Sunrise	2006–2012	Host
Celebrity Splash! Australia (TV series)	2013	Host
Sunrise (TV series)	2006–2015	Host/Guest Host
The Morning Show	2007–	Presenter
Dancing With the Stars (TV series)	2009–2015	Contestant/as Himself (3 guest)/Audience Member
The Weekly with Charlie Pickering (TV series)	2015	as Himself
Behave Yourself (TV series)	2017	as Himself
LCJ Q&A Podcast	2022	Podcast series
Telethon (TV series)	2007–2022	
The Chase Australia	2021–	Host
