= David Reyne =

Australian actor

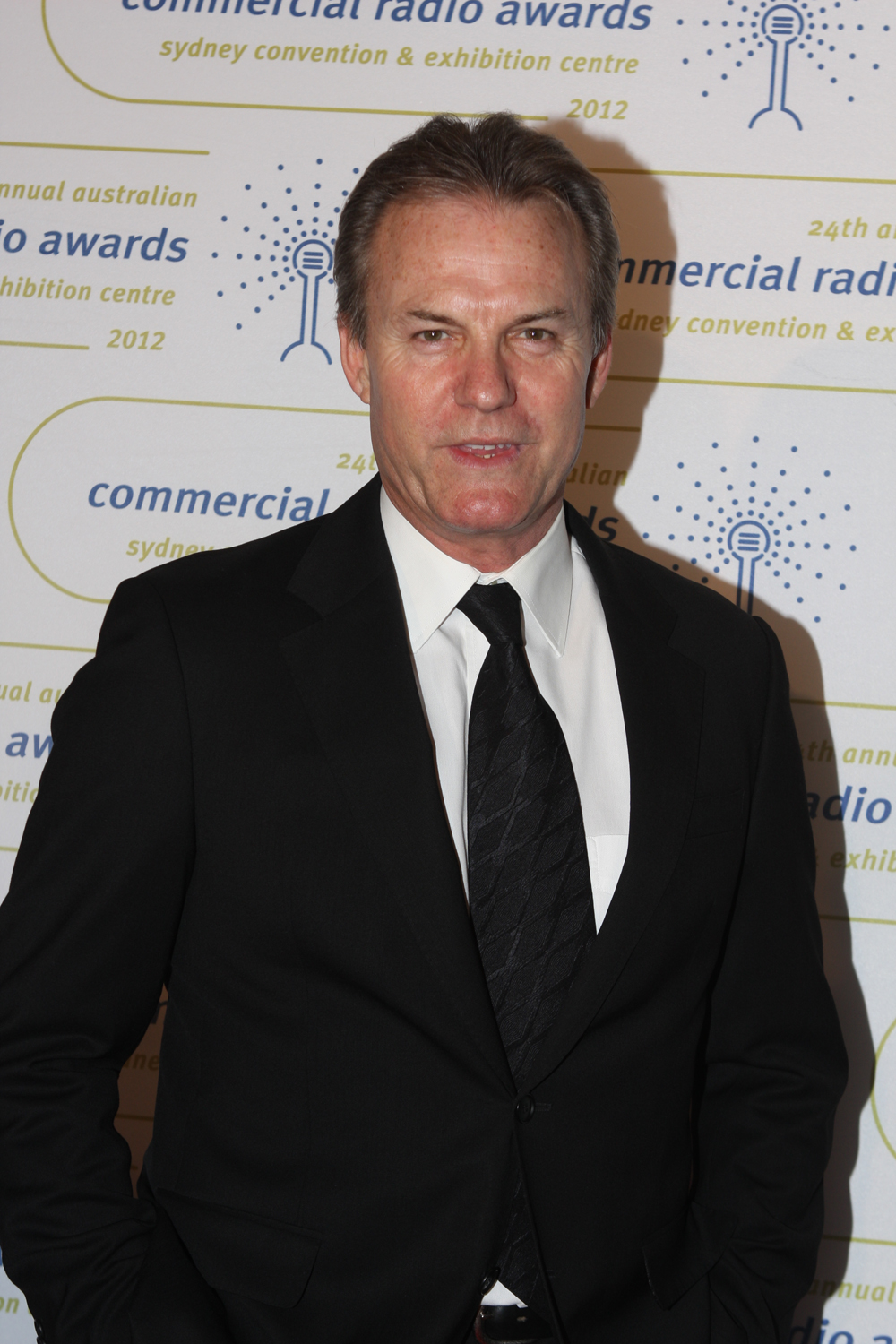
- Reyne in 2012
- Born: 14 May 1959 (age 67); Lagos, Nigeria
- Years active: 1978–present
- Spouse: Karina Loscher (m. 1994)
- Children: 2
- Family: James Reyne (brother)

David Nicholas Reyne (born 14 May 1959) is an Australian actor, musician, television and radio presenter.

== Early life and education ==
Reyne was born in Lagos, Nigeria to an Australian mother, Judith Leask and English diplomat father, Captain Rodney Michael Reyne. His father was an aide-de-camp (ADC) to the Queen of England, the Governor of Malta, and then Sir Dallas Brooks, the Governor of Victoria, Australia), before leaving the Royal Marines to take a post in Nigeria, where Reyne and his older brother James Reyne were both born.

When Reyne was six months old, the family relocated to Australia, where his younger sister, Elisabeth was born and his mother became the headmistress of a girls' school. Reyne was educated at The Peninsula School in Mount Eliza, on the Mornington Peninsula.

Reyne went on to study an acting course at Swinburne Film Institute, graduating in 1980 (leaving Australian Crawl in 1979 to do so).

== Career ==
=== Music ===
In 1978 when Clutch Cargo became the band Australian Crawl, Reyne, younger brother of lead singer James, continued as drummer. He filled this role for ten months before leaving to continue his acting education. He was later a vocalist for Cats Under Pressure (1984) and Chantoozies (1986–1990). Reyne co-wrote "Polar Notch" and "Let Me Be" (with Simon Hussey) for Cats Under Pressure, the latter of which was covered by Daryl Braithwaite. Whilst with Chantoozies, Reyne also sang backing vocals. Chantoozies most popular tracks were covers of Redbone's "Witch Queen", John Kongos' "He's Gonna Step on You Again" and Stephen Stills' "Love the One You're With". Fellow members included Ally Fowler, Tottie Goldsmith and Eve von Bibra.

=== Acting ===
Reyne began his acting career with a minor role in the 1983 film, Skin Deep. At the April 1985 TV Week Logie Awards ceremony, he won the 1984 Best New Talent Logie for his work in the ongoing role of Martin Kabel in the ABC series Sweet and Sour. Reyne's role as Kabel, "The Takeaways" guitarist/vocalist was shared with John Clifforth of the Australian pop music band Deckchairs Overboard who performed the on-screen vocals. Reyne followed this in 1985 with the ongoing role of Detective Vince Bailey in Nine Network soap opera Possession. Reyne also played lothario Dr. Guy Reid in the final two seasons of the Australian drama series, The Flying Doctors. In 2012, Reyne made a guest appearance in an episode of Neighbours, playing Dale Madden.

=== Presenting ===
Reyne has also worked as a television presenter. He briefly hosted Midday in 1995 with Tracy Grimshaw and has also worked as a reporter for the travel show Getaway between 1992 and 2005. After leaving Getaway at the end of 2005, Reyne signed with Network Ten to co-host with Kim Watkins the new morning show 9am with David and Kim which began 30 January 2006 and finished at the end of 2009. He rejoined Getaway again in 2010.

=== Radio ===
In May 2012, Reyne joined smoothFM in Sydney and Melbourne to host Wind Down from 8pm to 12am on weeknights. He remained with the station until his contract ended in March 2013.

=== Writing ===
As a writer, David contributed a regular column for Melbourne's Herald Sun, called 'Reyne’s World'. He has been a regular contributor to the 'Traveller' section for The Age.

== Awards ==
Year	Work	Award	Category	Result
1984	Sweet and Sour	Logie Awards	Logie Award for Most Popular New Talent	Won

== Filmography ==
=== Film ===
Year	Title	Role	Type
1982	Desolation Angels	2nd Apprentice	Feature film
1983	Skin Deep	Grant Johnson	Feature film
1986	Frenchman's Farm	Barry Norden	Feature film

=== Television ===
Year	Title	Role	Type
1984	Sweet and Sour	Martin Kabel	
1985	Possession	Detective Vince Bailey	
1986	Shark's Paradise	Rod Palmer	TV movie
1990	Bony		TV pilot
1990	Flair	Mark Tupper	Miniseries
1990–1992	The Flying Doctors	Dr Guy Reid	Seasons 8 & 9
1992–2006; 2010	Getaway	Reporter	
1994	Golden Fiddles	Jack Greville	Miniseries
1995	Midday	Co-host	
2005	20 to One	Narrator	Season 1
2006–2009	9am with David and Kim	Co-host	
2012	Neighbours	Dale Madden	1 episode
2012–2015	The Celebrity Apprentice Australia	Narrator	Seasons 2-4
2015	Darren & Brose	Guest	2 episodes

== Personal life ==
In 1987, Reyne began dating interior designer Karina Loscher, before marrying in 1994. They have two children – a son, born in 1995 and a daughter, born in 1999. Both of their children are musicians.

Reyne went on to work full time in property in Mount Eliza, Victoria. Loscher subsequently worked in a flower shop, before going on to work in the wine industry.

After Reyne's job on Getaway ended due to the COVID pandemic, he opened wine and cheese bar 'Plonk and Stink' in Flinders on the Mornington Peninsula together with his wife.

In 2026, he succcessfully underwent surgery to remove prostate cancer.

Preceded by Good Morning Australia with Bert Newton	9am with David and Kim; Co-host with Kim Watkins; January 2006 – 11 December 2009	Succeeded by The Circle
