= Christi Malthouse =

Australian journalist

- Born: Australia
- Occupation: Journalist

Christi Malthouse (born 1976) is an Australian journalist.

== Career ==
Malthouse was a journalist for Network Ten and is the daughter of Mick Malthouse, former Australian rules football player and the former coach of the Western Bulldogs, West Coast Eagles, Collingwood and Carlton Football Clubs in the AFL. In addition to her boundary-riding role for Ten's Australian Football League coverage, Christi has also been a sports presenter for Ten News and appeared on shows such as 9am with David and Kim as a health and fitness reporter, and Before The Game. She also hosted the football lifestyle show Beyond the Boundary.

Malthouse went on maternity leave in late 2008. She returned in 2009, but didn't return to Ten's AFL coverage. She remained the main fill-in for Stephen Quartermain on Ten News Melbourne Sport.

In May 2010, Malthouse left and joined the Nine Network and became a presenter on the Sunday AFL Footy Show. Malthouse has also provided the commentary for the AFL video game series.

== Publishing ==
In 2012, Malthouse wrote a biography of her father, Malthouse: A Football Life.

== Personal life ==
On 18 November 2007, Malthouse married personal trainer Dean Casamento. Together they have three children, Zac, Lillia and Grace
