= Gild the Lily =

Studio album by Chantoozies
- Released: 15 April 1991
- Recorded: 1989–1990
- Studio: Rhinoceros Studios, Sydney; Metropolis Audio, Melbourne; Gotham Audio, Melbourne
- Genre: Pop, electronic, synthpop
- Length: 48:29
- Label: Mushroom
- Producer: John Van Tongeren

Chantoozies chronology
Chantoozies (1988)	Gild the Lily (1991)	The Chantoozies Compilation (2023)

Singles from Gild the Lily
- 1. "Come Back to Me" Released: October 1989; 2. "Walk On" Released: October 1990; 3. "Love the One You're With" Released: February 1991

Gild the Lily is the second and to date final studio album by Australian pop group Chantoozies. The album was released in April 1991 by Mushroom Records and peaked at number 71 on the ARIA Charts.

== Track listing ==
=== LP (L 30249) ===
Side A
No.	Title	Writer(s)	Length
1.	"Love the One You're With"	Stephen Stills	3:49
2.	"Walk On"	Eve von Bibra, Brett Goldsmith, John Van Tongeren	3:47
3.	"Moonchild"	Goldsmith	4:01
4.	"Love Comes"	Goldsmith, David Reyne	4:42
5.	"Mystery"	Goldsmith, Reyne	4:39
6.	"Come Back"	von Bibra, Goldsmith	4:21

Side B
No.	Title	Writer(s)	Length
1.	"Love Someone"	von Bibra, Goldsmith	4:03
2.	"Kiss Him Goodbye"	Frank McCoy, Van Tongeren	3:34
3.	"Babe in the Woods"	von Bibra, Goldsmith	3:46
4.	"Who Cares"	Reyne, Goldsmith, von Bibra	3:51
5.	"Baby Blue"	von Bibra, Goldsmith	3:50
6.	"Take My Lovin'"	Reyne, Goldsmith, von Bibra	3:59

A cover of the Jackson 5's "I'll Be There", was released as a single on 23 September 1991, with "Who Cares" as the B-side. This was the Chantoozies' final release during their original run. A cover of The Angels' "My Boyfriend's Back" was also included on the soundtrack to the 1990 film The Crossing.

The album would later be reissued with a modified tracklist, where "Mystery" and "Baby Blue" were removed and replaced by "Wanna Be Up" and "Kiss 'n' Tell" from the debut album. Digital reissues of the album, however, contain the original tracklist.

== Charts ==
Chart (1991)	Peak position
Australian Albums (ARIA)	71
