= Chantoozies (album) =

Studio album by Chantoozies
- Released: 22 August 1988
- Recorded: November 1986–May 1988
- Studio: Metropolis Audio, Platinum Studios, Rhinoceros Studios
- Genre: Pop, electronic, synthpop
- Label: Mushroom
- Producer: Brett Goldsmith, David Courtney, Ian McKenzie, Mark S. Berry

Chantoozies chronology
Chantoozies (1988)	Gild the Lily (1991)

Singles from Chantoozies
- 1. "Witch Queen" Released: 12 January 1987; 2. "He's Gonna Step on You Again" Released: 8 June 1987; 3. "Wanna Be Up" Released: 2 May 1988; 4. "Kiss 'n' Tell" Released: 26 September 1988

Chantoozies is the self-titled debut studio album by Australian pop group the Chantoozies. The album was released in August 1988 by Mushroom Records and peaked at number 6 on the ARIA Charts. It is the only full-length studio album to feature founding member Tottie Goldsmith.

== Track listing ==
LP (L 93279)

Side A
No.	Title	Writer(s)	Length
1.	"Wanna Be Up"	Eve von Bibra, Brett Goldsmith	3:39
2.	"Kiss 'n' Tell"	von Bibra, Goldsmith	4:04
3.	"Bang Bang"	James Reyne, von Bibra	4:02
4.	"Slightest Notion"	J. Reyne, Simon Hussey	4:26
5.	"Weatherman"	Goldsmith, J. Reyne, J. Scott	4:21
6.	"He's Gonna Step on You Again"	John Kongos, Christos Demetriou	3:40

Side B
No.	Title	Writer(s)	Length
7.	"Hey Lord"	von Bibra, Goldsmith	5:31
8.	"Shakin' Up the Ground"	Goldsmith	5:32
9.	"Witch Queen"	Lolly Vegas, Pat Vegas	4:18
10.	"Little Boy Blue"	J. Reyne, B. Goldsmith	4:45

== Charts ==
=== Weekly charts ===
Chart (1988–1989)	Peak position
Australian Albums (ARIA)	8

=== Year-end Charts ===
Chart (1988)	Peak position
Australian (ARIA) Albums Chart	41
Australian Artist Albums Chart	17

== Certifications ==
Region	Certification	Certified units/sales
Australia (ARIA)	Platinum	70,000^{^}
^{^} Shipments figures based on certification alone.

== Release history ==
Release dates and formats for "Chantoozies"
Country	Date	Format	Label	Ref.
Australia	22 August 1988	LP and cassette	Mushroom	
Australia	12 September 1988	CD	Mushroom	
