= Saving Kids =

Australian television series

- Genre: Medical
- Presented by: Damien Leith
- Country of origin: Australia
- Original language: English
- No. of seasons: 1
- No. of episodes: 8

Original release
- Network: Network Ten
- Release: 2008 – 2008

Related
- Saving Babies

Saving Kids is an Australian medical documentary television series that screened on Network Ten on Thursdays in 2008, was filmed at the Sydney Children's Hospital and is presented by singer Damien Leith. In half-hour episodes, it tells the stories of children and their families during medical examinations and treatments.
