= Emerson Newton-John =

American racing driver

- Born: September 26, 1974 (age 52) Los Angeles, California, U.S.
- Relatives: Olivia Newton-John (aunt); Brett Goldsmith (half-brother); Tottie Goldsmith (half-sister); Jeff Conaway (step-father)
- Debut season: 2014
- Starts: 3
- Wins: 0
- Poles: 0
- Best finish: 121st in 2014

Previous series
- 2012 2002 2000–2001 1998: Firestone Indy Lights; NASCAR Craftsman Truck Series; Formula Holden; Renault Megane Cup

NASCAR FedEx Freight Truck Series career
- 1 race run over 1 year
- Best finish: 94th (2002)
- First race: 2002 New England 200 (Loudon)
Wins	Top tens	Poles
0	0	0
- Statistics up to date as of April 10, 2026.

Emerson Newton-John (born September 26, 1974) is an American professional racing driver. The nephew of Olivia Newton-John, he has competed in NASCAR, the ARCA Racing Series, and the Indy Lights Series.

== Racing career ==
Newton-John competed in the Formula Holden Tasman Cup in 2000–2001, nearly winning his inaugural event in the series, and the Formula Holden Australian Drivers' Championship in 2001, finishing fifth, with a best result of second; he also competed in the French Renault Megane Cup, and tested a Formula Three car. His final Formula Holden race was on September 10, 2001; the September 11 attacks resulted in financial backing for his open-wheel career drying up, and Newton-John switched to stock cars.

Newton-John made his debut in stock car racing in November 2001, competing in the ARCA Re/MAX Series at Atlanta Motor Speedway where he ran as high as twelfth after starting from the back of the field. He ended up fifteenth. In 2002, he competed in his first NASCAR event, a Craftsman Truck Series race at New Hampshire Motor Speedway; he finished 31st in the event, following a weekend that Newton-John described as "disastrous".

In 2012, Newton-John returned to professional racing, driving an open-wheel formula car for the first time in almost eleven years in a test at Iowa Speedway. Passing a refresher test, he went on to compete in the Freedom 100 Firestone Indy Lights race, driving for Tyce Carlson's Fan Force United team. He was 6th fastest in practice and qualified in 8th position. He was involved in a multi-car incident on the fifth lap of the event, and was credited with a seventeenth place finish. He ran again in Indy Lights later in the year at the Grand Prix of Baltimore; he crashed twice due to faulty rear suspension, first in qualifying for the event, and then in the race, finishing 12th of 13 cars.

In 2014, Newton-John returned to the ARCA Racing Series, driving for Carter 2 Motorsports at Madison International Speedway; running as a start-and-park, he finished 23rd.

== Personal life ==
A native of Los Angeles, California, Newton-John is the son of Graeme Hall and Rona Newton-John (1941–2013), stepson of Jeff Conaway, half-brother of Fiona Goldsmith, Brett Goldsmith and Tottie Goldsmith, and the nephew of Olivia Newton-John. He is named after two-time Indianapolis 500 winner Emerson Fittipaldi.

Newton-John is the founder of the charitable organization Pink and Blue for Two, focused on breast and prostate cancer awareness.

== Motorsports career results ==
=== American open–wheel racing results ===
(key)

==== Indy Lights ====
Year	Team	1	2	3	4	5	6	7	8	9	10	11	12	Rank	Points
2012	Fan Force United	STP	BBR	LBH	INDY; 17	DET	MLW	IOW	TOR	EDM	TRV	BAL; 12	CAL	22nd	31

=== NASCAR ===
(key) (Bold − Pole position awarded by qualifying time. Italics − Pole position earned by points standings or practice time. * – Most laps led.)

==== Craftsman Truck Series ====
NASCAR Craftsman Truck Series results
Year	Team	No.	Make	1	2	3	4	5	6	7	8	9	10	11	12	13	14	15	16	17	18	19	20	21	22	NCTSC	Pts	Ref
2002	Team Racing	23	Chevy	DAY	DAR	MAR	GTY	PPR	DOV	TEX	MEM	MLW	KAN	KEN	NHA; 31	MCH	IRP	NSH	RCH	TEX	SBO	LVS	CAL	PHO	HOM	94th	70	

^{*} Season still in progress
^{1} Ineligible for series points

=== ARCA Racing Series ===
(key) (Bold – Pole position awarded by qualifying time. Italics – Pole position earned by points standings or practice time. * – Most laps led.)

ARCA Racing Series results
Year	Team	No.	Make	1	2	3	4	5	6	7	8	9	10	11	12	13	14	15	16	17	18	19	20	21	22	23	24	25	ARSC	Pts	Ref
2001		35	Chevy	DAY	NSH	WIN	SLM	GTY	KEN	CLT	KAN	MCH	POC	MEM	GLN	KEN	MCH	POC	NSH	ISF	CHI	DSF	SLM	TOL	BLN	CLT	TAL	ATL; 17	142nd	145	
2014	Carter 2 Motorsports	97	Dodge	DAY	MOB	SLM	TAL	TOL	NJE	POC	MCH	ELK	WIN	CHI	IRP	POC	BLN	ISF	MAD; 23	DSF	SLM	KEN	KAN						121st	115	
2015	Carter 2 Motorsports	95	Dodge	DAY	MOB	NSH	SLM	TAL	TOL	NJE; 24	POC	MCH	CHI	WIN	IOW	IRP	POC	BLN	ISF	DSF	SLM	KEN	KAN						122nd	110	
