= Hotel Sessions (Olivia Newton-John EP) =

EP by Olivia Newton-John
- Released: 8 April 2014
- Recorded: 2002–2011; Melbourne, Australia
- Genre: Pop; dance-pop
- Length: 30:15
- Label: ONJ Productions
- Producer: Brett Goldsmith; Mark Hartley (exec.); David Hornos Esteve

Olivia Newton-John chronology
This Christmas (2012)	Hotel Sessions (2014)	Two Strong Hearts Live (2015)

Hotel Sessions is an extended play (EP) recording by British-Australian recording artist Olivia Newton-John, released on 8 April 2014. It is her first EP focusing on unreleased songs and was released independently by ONJ Productions, Newton-John's own production company. It was also Newton-John's last album released by that company, before she signed with Sony Music Australia.

Hotel Sessions was first available at Summer Nights, Newton-John's nineteenth concert tour. Physical copies were later available from her official website, together with digital download versions at online shops. The EP is dedicated to Rona Newton-John, Olivia's sister and Brett Goldsmith's mother, who passed on in 2013.

== Background and development ==
The songs featured on Hotel Sessions were recorded over a period of nine years, at hotel rooms which Newton-John stayed during her concert tours. All five songs were produced by Brett Goldsmith, her nephew. Goldsmith previously released a version of "Ordinary Life" on his YouTube account in 2008. Long before Hotel Sessions was released, he also leaked Newton-John's recordings of "Best of My Love", a demo which features a different production of the final track, a Mr. Mister cover "Broken Wings". "Bow River" is another cover song, originally released by Australian band Cold Chisel. Hotel Sessions also features dances remixes of "Broken Wings" and "Best of My Love", made by remixer DayBeat.

== Track listing ==
All songs produced by Brett Goldsmith.

No.	Title	Writer(s)	Length
1.	"Ordinary Life"	Brett Goldsmith	4:28
2.	"Best of My Love"	Goldsmith	4:45
3.	"End in Peace"	Olivia Newton-John, Goldsmith	4:33
4.	"Bow River"	Ian Moss	4:18
5.	"Broken Wings"	Richard Page, Steve George, John Lang	4:33

Bonus tracks
No.	Title	Length
6.	"Broken Wings" (dance remix by DayBeat)	5:03
7.	"Best of My Love" (dance remix by DayBeat)	3:55
Total length:		30:15

== Credits and personnel ==
- Joe Creighton – bass
- Lu Lu Foster – typography
- Steve George – songwriter
- Brett Goldsmith – artwork, producer, songwriter
- Mark Hartley – executive producer
- David Hornos Esteve – remix
- Keith Johnston – booklet art
- John Lang – songwriter
- Danny McKenna – drums
- Natalie Miller – background vocals
- Ian Moss – songwriter
- Olivia Newton-John – songwriter, vocals
- Richard Page – songwriter

Credits adapted from the album's liner notes.
