= Shawn Cosgrove =

Australian actor, voiceover artist and television announcer (born 1955)

- Born: 2 December 1955 (age 70); Toowoomba, Queensland
- Occupations: Actor, voice over artist, television announcer
- Years active: 1973–present

Shawn Cosgrove (born 2 December 1955) is an Australian actor, voice-over artist and television announcer based in Melbourne, Victoria.

== Early life ==
Cosgrove was born on 2 December 1955 and grew up in Toowoomba, Queensland.

== Biography ==
He is most known for his work as the announcer on The Price Is Right, where he shouts "Come on Down!" to the contestants chosen to play.

Cosgrove has also been a radio host on 104.3 Gold FM and has appeared in a range of television and radio commercials. He is also the chief voiceover announcer on SEN 1116. Until March 2010, he also worked as a radio personality host on 3MP on weekdays from 3-7pm.

Before he announced The Price is Right for the Nine Network, he was the announcer on a Seven Network kids' game show pilot called Inter-Stellar Patrol (hosted by Tony Gordon). However, he's never actually heard of this show which became apparent when his son quizzed him about it. Furthermore, Cosgrove has never worked for Channel 7 on a consistent basis, which this show suggests he did.

"Cossie" as he is affectionately known can be heard on Sky Sports Radio which is heard across New South Wales. His keen interest across the three codes of racing is apparent with his quick wit and broad knowledge he portrays. "Racing HQ", which Cosgrove and Andrew Bensley share hosting, is the main program from which he can be heard- airs from 9:30 am weekdays. Regular segments include the popular "Chinwag with Cossie" on Tuesdays, where many of racing's true characters are regularly interviewed.

Cosgrove is also part of the National Racing Service team.

Cosgrove can also be seen as an announcer at the Winner's Club at Moonee Valley Racecourse on race day meetings.
