= Starting Out =

- Genre: Soap opera
- Created by: Reg Watson
- Country of origin: Australia
- Original language: English
- No. of seasons: 1
- No. of episodes: 85

Production
- Producer: Sue Masters
- Production company: Reg Grundy Organisation

Original release
- Network: Nine Network
- Release: 5 April 1983 – 1983

Related
- The Young Doctors

Starting Out is an Australian television soap opera made for the Nine Network by the Reg Grundy Organisation in 1983.

== Background ==
The five-night-a-week series was created by Reg Watson as the network's replacement for the long-running serial The Young Doctors. It was produced by Sue Masters who had also been the producer of The Young Doctors.

It was set at a medical college with an emphasis on young people getting their first experience of living away from home and leading independent lives. Starting Out debuted on 5 April 1983 in Melbourne and 18 April 1983 in Sydney. It aired in an early evening slot of 6pm week night's before the network's news service.

== Cast ==
- Leander Brett as Aggie Dean
- Antoinette Byron as Laurel Adams
- David Clencie as Ben McNamara
- Nikki Coghill as Margot Fallon-Smith
- Tottie Goldsmith as Trixie Sheldon
- Alexander Sebastian as Simon Hamilton
- Rowena Mohr as Michelle Rivers
- Julie Nihill as Tessa Staples
- Peter O'Brien as Craig Holt
- David Reyne as Paul Harding
- Yves Stenning as Will Brodie
- Gary Sweet as Rod Turner
- Paul Williams as Peter Nolan
- Maurie Fields as Mac Rankin
- Suzy Gashler as Yvonne Rivers
- Caroline Gillmer as Eleannor Harris
- John Grant as Dr. Greg Munro
- Jill Forster as Dr. Judith Holt
- John Hamblin as Dr. James Holt
- Gerard Maguire as Dr. John Rivers
- Anne Phelan as Mrs. De Soosa
- Marie Redshaw as Mrs. Lynch
- Colin Vancao as Russell Dean

== Cancellation ==
The series failed to gain sufficient ratings and was quickly cancelled and removed from network schedules by 20 May 1983. Some of the unaired episodes were screened sporadically out-of-ratings in late 1983. Not until a late night repeat run during the later half of 1989 several years after production did all of the 85 produced episodes go to air.

== Reception ==
Robert Fidgeon of the Herald Sun named Starting Out as one of "Australia's All-time Top 50 TV Turkeys". He stated "For some reason Peter O'Brien said yes to this dumb soap about dumb teen medical students living in a boarding house. Planned 17-week run lasted three." Fidgeon's colleague Fiona Byrne included Starting Out in her feature about "long forgotten Australian TV dramas that made viewers switch off." Summing it up, she wrote "It debuted on Channel 9 in April 1983 with little fanfare. It was pulled from the network's schedule after little more than a month and naturally there was not a second season."
