= Pooch Perfect =

- Genre: Reality; Dog grooming
- Directed by: Mark Adamson
- Presented by: Rebel Wilson
- Judges: Amber Lewin; Colin Taylor; Jorge Bendersky
- Country of origin: Australia
- Original language: English
- No. of seasons: 1
- No. of episodes: 8

Original release
- Network: Seven Network
- Release: 27 February – 16 April 2020

Pooch Perfect is a dog grooming reality competition television program created by Seven Studios UK (now Beyond Productions UK) and first broadcast on the Seven Network in Australia. The program is hosted by Rebel Wilson, and began airing on 27 February 2020. The series features ten professional dog stylists competing in a series of themed challenges which sees the transformation of beloved pets, with a judging panel including international styling experts Amber Lewin and Colin Taylor determining the winner of $100,000 in prize money. The title is a play-on-words of the film Pitch Perfect, in which Wilson starred.

Despite the high profile of host Wilson and significant promotion by Seven prior to broadcast, the show struggled in the ratings, and the series was absent at Seven's upfronts for 2021. Despite this, local adaptations of the show aired in the United Kingdom and the United States in 2021, with Wilson reprising her role as host for the latter version.

== Contestants ==
- Davina Dewar
- Natasha Fox
- Brad Broadway
- Prue Hammond
- Monique Finch
- Annie
- Alicia
- Sue Wright
- Lee Wright

== Episodes ==
No.	Original release date	Australian viewers
1	27 February 2020	697,000
2	5 March 2020	490,000
3	12 March 2020	430,000
4	19 March 2020	265,000^{[a]}
5	26 March 2020	387,000
6	2 April 2020	299,000
7	9 April 2020	259,000
8	16 April 2020	316,000

== International adaptations ==
Country	Network	Host	Episodes	Premiere date	Finale date
UK	BBC One	Sheridan Smith	8	7 January 2021	4 March 2021
USA	ABC	Rebel Wilson	8	30 March 2021	18 May 2021

The format was sold in February 2020 to the BBC. The UK series is hosted by Sheridan Smith and filmed at dock10 studios. Beyond Productions UK produced the series with Damon Pattison and Susanne Rock as executive producer. It was cancelled after one season.

ABC announced a US version of the series in January 2021 with Wilson as host and Lisa Vanderpump, Jorge Bendersky and Callie Harris as judges. An eight-episode run was ordered, which premiered on 30 March 2021. It ended on May 18, 2021, and was canceled on January 20, 2022.

== See also ==
- Celebrity Dog School

== Notes ==
- ^{a} This episode aired on 7TWO in Victoria and South Australia due to coverage of the AFL.
