= Steve Austin (dog trainer) =

Australian dog trainer

Steve Austin is an Australian dog trainer, who has been training dogs for over 30 years. He is renowned as one of Australia's top animal trainers, with a particular skill in dog behaviour and training. His lifetime in dog training has seen him train animals for quarantine, search and rescue, police work, and wildlife preservation, among other roles. He has also travelled internationally lecturing and training dogs.

== Personal life ==
Steve Austin, as a 12-year-old, was given a puppy. This dog was called "Sooty", and he taught the dog to balance a schooner of beer on its head.

Austin and his wife, Vicki, previously owned Pet Resorts Australia in Dural and Terrigal, NSW, where they offered dog boarding and training.

== Career ==
Austin was notably the National Detector Dog Trainer with the Australian Quarantine and Inspection Service for 10 years (1996–2006) where he pioneered training dogs to indicate materials that were potentially dangerous to Australia, particularly food products. He has also worked with state-branches of quarantine in several states.

Much of Austin's work has been around training dogs for scent detection and many of the dogs used for this work are rescued from shelter situations. He is recognized as being the trainer of Australia's first truffle detector dog in Tasmania. He has also been involved in training termite detector dogs. He has worked with the Californian Narcotic Drug Association and California Narcotic and Explosive Detector Dog Association on training dogs for narcotic detection. He has been involved in training dogs internationally, including New Caledonia Agricultural Detector Dog Unit.

In Australia, he has often trained dogs for environmental roles, including training dogs to locate cats and foxes in the Kimberley, WA, Australia, to locate rabbits and rodents, on Macquarie Island, Australia, and also to locate cane toads. He also trained fox detection dogs for Lane Cove Council, NSW. Fox detecting dogs have also been trained by Austin for use in Manly, New South Wales, and these dogs have also been trained to alert to little penguins, for conservation purposes. Similarly, he has trained dogs to alert to Murray River turtles. In Namibia, Africa, he has trained dogs to track cheetah scats.

Additionally, Austin has lectured to international audiences, including: American law enforcement agencies, at Sydney's Taronga Zoo, Mt Everest Kennel Club in Kathmandu, colleges throughout Japan, and Czech Republic Customs Detector Dog Unit. He has been involved with temperament assessing dogs in a variety of contexts, both in Australia and California.

Austin has owned and trained an Australian Obedience Champion and two field trial Champions, and also is licensed and active as a judge with the Australian National Kennel Club (ANKC) for these events. He once won the Sydney Royal Dog Obedience Utility Dog Section.

== Television appearances ==
He has made a number of television appearances on including ABC's Catalyst and other current affairs programs, Celebrity Dog School, Harry's Practice, 60 Minutes and The 7:30 Report. In 2011 he received much television exposure for his work in training rabbit and rodent indicating dogs for seabird preservation on Macquarie Island.
