= Cash Bonanza =

Australian game show

- Presented by: Larry Emdur
- Voices of: Steve Andrews
- Country of origin: Australia
- Original language: English
- No. of seasons: 1
- No. of episodes: 18

Production
- Production locations: Warner Bros. Movie World, Gold Coast, Queensland
- Running time: Approx 30 minutes (including commercials)
- Production company: Grundy Television

Original release
- Network: Nine Network
- Release: 3 March – 30 June 2001

Cash Bonanza is an Australian game show hosted by Larry Emdur, which was broadcast on the Nine Network in 2001. Filmed at Warner Bros. Movie World on the Gold Coast, Queensland, Australia, Cash Bonanza was a joint initiative between all five Australian lottery agencies.

== Format ==
=== Overview ===
At the start of each show, a shot of the contestants going down the famous splash drop at the end of the Wild West Falls Adventure Ride also at Movie World was shown.

Three contestants participated in each game, selected at random from the 15 contestants, who were already drawn from those who had eligible winning scratch-it tickets.

If on any game when the contestant did not win the full $5000, the part of the $5000 that they did not win will be given to a lucky home viewer. For example, if the contestant won $3000, the home viewer will get the other $2000.

=== Round 1 – Gold Diggers Derby ===
The contestants, seated in mine carts, competed in getting their minecart to the end of the track. They took turns in picking numbers from a board of 15. Each number concealed either a red, yellow or blue coloured screen, which moves that coloured cart forward one space. The first contestant to reach the end of their track won an amount up to $5,000. The runners up got $500 each.

=== Round 2 – Double Quick Draw ===
Three new contestants played Rock, Paper, Scissors. This game is played over nine rounds. In the first round they play for $30 and this amount increases progressively for each round until the final round where it is $2000. If each contestant selected the same item as each other, the round is considered a draw and the cash up for grabs will be added onto the next round. In cases where all three items appear by one of three contestants, it is also a draw. Whenever two players select the item that beats the other player, the two winners will get the amounts up on offer each. If one player beats the other two, they will get double amount they were playing for. At the end of the last round, the player with the highest amount of cash will win that amount of cash up to $5000 and the runners get $500 each regardless of how high their score was.

=== Round 3 – Drop The Silver Dollar ===
The contestants take turns of dropping "silver dollars", or giant coins into a giant Pachinko machine, which have movable, rotatable parts. Each contestant has three drops each and at the bottom of the Pachinko board there are five pockets, each with a different cash amount each. The amounts increase after each round of drops. After all contestants have dropped three coins into the machine, the contestant who got the highest cash amount will get to drop another coin. This time each pocket will be given either the word 'WIN' or 'LOSE' randomly. If the coin lands in a 'WIN' pocket, that player wins $5000 and the other two players will get $500 each regardless of their score. If however, the coin lands in a 'LOSE' pocket, the person who dropped it will only get $500 and the next highest scorer will win whatever their cash amount was. The lowest scoring player will also get $500 in this case.

=== Round 4 ===
The contestant who won the highest amount of money from the previous rounds will play for $100,000. A lucky home viewer who entered the draw will be randomly selected to play for the $100,000 against the contestant. The contestant on the show will get to pick one of twelve celebrities on a giant screen. Each celebrity conceals a very brief video of themselves. Six celebrities say that contestant in the studio will get to pick first while the other six celebrities will say that the home viewer will go first. The home-viewer is not in the actual studio but will do their selections over the phone. In the second part of this round the contestant and the home viewer took turns in selecting celebrities. One celebrity has a big $100,000 cheque. Another celebrity has a dynamite and the other ten celebrities will reveal $500 if selected, which will be added to a player's prize money. This round ends when either player has selected the person with either the cheque or the dynamite. If the player selects the celebrity who has the cheque, they will instantly win the $100,000. If the player selects the one with the dynamite, their opponent will get the $100,000. If the home player missed out on the $100,000, they got a trip to the Gold Coast.

== Reception ==
This game show did not rate very well because it lacked the elements such as skills, knowledge, risk taking (unlike the much more successful Deal or No Deal, which also requires a great deal of luck) and variety which makes a gameshow exciting. Winning on this game involves very little else other than luck. Another flaw in this gameshow was the lack of variety; the same games were played at the same time in each show, unlike The Price is Right (the Australian version was also hosted by Larry Emdur), where there were dozens of games that seemed to appear randomly on each show.
