= Saving Babies =

Australian television series

- Genre: Medical
- Presented by: Kim Watkins
- Country of origin: Australia
- Original language: English
- No. of seasons: 1
- No. of episodes: 7

Production
- Running time: 30 Minutes

Original release
- Network: Network Ten
- Release: 15 February – 29 March 2007

Related
- Saving Kids

Saving Babies is an Australian medical documentary television series that screened on Network Ten from 15 February 2007 to 29 March 2007; airing seven episodes. The show was filmed at Sydney's Royal Hospital for Women and presented by former newsreader, Kim Watkins.

The show follows the stories of unwell newborn infants and their families as they go through numerous medical examinations and treatments. Each half-hour show follows three families and their stories while in the hospital. The program was broadcast on Thursday nights.

The shows presenter, Kim Watkins, has had her own experience with the Royal Hospital for Women after giving birth to premature twin girls.

== Spin-Off ==
While the show did not eventually return for a second season, a spin-off series, Saving Kids, aired on Network Ten in 2008. Watkins did not reprise her role as host, with Damien Leith taking over.
