= The Price Is Right (Australian game show) =

- Logo (2012)
- Also known as: The New Price Is Right (1981–1985)
- Created by: Bob Stewart
- Presented by: Bruce Beeby; Geoff Manion; Keith Walshe; Horrie Dargie; Garry Meadows; Ian Turpie; Larry Emdur
- Announcer: Keith Livingston; John Deeks; Gavin Wood; Shawn Cosgrove; Brodie Young
- Theme music composer: Jack Grimsley (1981–1985); Tweed Harris (1989, 1993–1998, 2003–2005)
- Country of origin: Australia
- Original language: English
- No. of episodes: 1,623

Production
- Producer: Michael Pope (2003–2005)
- Production locations: HSV-7 Studios, South Melbourne (1981–1985); ATV-10 Studios, Melbourne, Victoria (1973-1974, 1989); GTV-9 Studios Melbourne (1993–1998, 2003–2005); Global Television Studios, Eveleigh (2012)
- Running time: 30 minutes (1973–1974, 1981–1985, 1993–1998, 2003–2005, 2012); 60 minutes (1989, 2004–2005)
- Production companies: Grundy Productions (1973–2005); FremantleMedia Australia (2012)

Original release
- Network: ATN-7; GTV-9; Seven Network
- Release: 1957 – 1963
- Network: Network 10
- Release: 5 February 1973 – 13 December 1974
- Network: Seven Network
- Release: 7 September 1981 – 14 June 1985
- Network: Network 10
- Release: 29 July – 14 October 1989
- Network: Nine Network
- Release: 13 December 1993 – 24 November 2005
- Network: Seven Network
- Release: 7 May – 19 December 2012

Related
- The Price Is Right (1957–1963); The Price Is Right

The Price Is Right is an Australian television game show that has been produced in a number of different formats, based on the American concept of the same title. The most recent of these formats began airing on 7 May 2012 on Seven Network. Larry Emdur, who hosted the program on two occasions prior to 2012, was the presenter for the 2012 revival.

== Original version ==
Two regional versions based on the original 1950s US format aired nearly concurrently – one aired on ATN-7 in Sydney, hosted by Bruce Beeby and later Keith Walshe from 1957 to 1959; the other was on GTV-9 in Melbourne and hosted by Geoff Manion in 1958. The latter version debuted 10 August 1958, airing for 16 episodes on Sundays at 5:30PM. After it ended, the timeslot was taken up by panel discussion series Face the Nation (based on the US series of the same name), which had previously aired at 5:00PM.

In 1963, the Seven Network aired a nationwide version hosted by Horrie Dargie.

== Garry Meadows era (1973–74) ==
The first version of the modern The Price Is Right format first aired in Australia on the 0-10 Network from 1973 to 1974; this version was hosted by Garry Meadows and announcer Keith Livingston. At this time, Reg Grundy Organisation was copying many shows from Goodson-Todman Productions in the U.S.; they had a flair for making detailed copies of sets, and The Price Is Right was no exception. Grundy staffer Bill Mason went to the United States to research the show in detail.

The show started in an hour-long daytime slot on 5 February 1973 (a mere five months after the original first aired in the States), and was later given a half-hour, primetime slot on the network (premiering on 30 April 1973). This version established a completely different Showcase round. In it, the day's two top winners first bid on the price of one showcase in the "Showcase Playoff", played in the style of the short-lived U.S. pricing game Double Bullseye. Both players would be given a A$50 range to bid within. After one player bid, the other player would be told whether to bid higher or lower than the other player's bid. The first contestant to bid the correct price then attempted to place the prizes in order from least to most expensive on a pricing board in the Showcase itself, similar to the later U.S. pricing game Eazy az 1 2 3. This contestant would become one of the first four contestants on the next show as a "carry-over" contestant.

== First Ian Turpie era (1981–85) ==
The Price Is Right later aired on Seven Network from 1981 to 1985 with host Ian Turpie and announcer John Deeks as The New Price Is Right. This version featured returning champions, reviving the carry-over contestant format previously used during the Garry Meadows era. At first, the format of the show consisted of three pricing games, the Showcase Playoff, and the Showcase for a showcase of seven prizes and the biggest winner competed against the champion in the Showcase Payoff. In 1984, a new format replaced the third game with the Showcase Showdown from the American version, with $1.00 earning a bonus prize and the winner facing the champion in the Showcase Playoff. Both players alternated bidding within a $100 range and the winner advanced to the Showcase. It is not known if there was a limit as to how many times champions could return; any shows where there wasn't a returning champion involved did use a third pricing game.

During the Turpie era, an exact bid on a prize up for bids won a $50 bonus.

=== Pricing game lineup ===
The following pricing games were played on the Seven Network version from 1981 to 1985:

- Any Number
- Bargain Game
- Bonus Game
- Bullseye
- Card Game
- Check Game
- Check Out
- Cliff Hangers
- Clock Game
- Danger Price
- Dice Game
- Double Prices
- Five Price Tags
- Give Or Keep
- Grocery Game
- It's Optional
- Hi-Lo
- Hit Me
- Hole in One
- Lucky $even
- Make Your Move
- Money Game
- Most Expensive
- Mystery Price
- Penny Ante
- Pick a Pair
- Poker Game
- Race Game
- Range Game
- Safe Crackers
- Shell Game
- Squeeze Play
- Switcheroo
- Take Two
- Trader Bob
- Temptation
- Ten Chances
- Three Strikes

== Second Ian Turpie era (1989) ==
The show returned on 29 July 1989 until 14 October 1989 for an hour-long version, again hosted by Turpie airing Saturday nights on 10 TV Australia as part of Network Ten's attempted revamp that year; however, it only lasted 12 episodes. The format resembled the US version to some extent, with two pricing games (as opposed to three on the US version), then a Showcase Showdown, then repeat. The two Showdown winners then competed in the Showcase Playoff, with the winner advancing to the Showcase.

=== Pricing game lineup ===
The following pricing games were played on the Network Ten version in 1989:

- Any Number
- Cliff Hangers
- Clock Game
- Credit Card
- Dice Game
- Double Prices
- Five Price Tags
- Grocery Game
- Hole in One
- Lucky $even
- Money Game
- Pathfinder
- Race Game
- Range Game
- Safe Crackers
- Squeeze Play
- Switcheroo
- Temptation

== First Larry Emdur era (1993–98) ==
The Price Is Right was revived again from 13 December 1993 until 2 October 1998 on Nine Network, hosted by Larry Emdur with announcer Shawn Cosgrove. The show used the same format as the 1981–85 edition, except that an exact bid on a prize up for bids earned a $100 bonus.

Cars given away on the mid-'90s version of the program were provided by Daihatsu until 1994, SEAT from 1995 to 1997 and Mazda for the 1998 run. In 1998, the show was cancelled and replaced for a period of one week with a daily version of Who Wants To Be A Millionaire? in 1999.

It was also once aired on Singapore's Channel 5 for 13 episodes in July and August 2000.

=== Pricing game lineup ===
The following pricing games were played during the Nine Network's first run:

- Any Number
- Bump
- Buy or Sell
- Cliff Hangers
- Clock Game
- Cover Up
- Dice Game
- Five Price Tags
- Grocery Game (range to win is $10–$10.50)
- Hole in One
- Magic #
- Make Your Move
- Money Game
- One Away
- One Dollar Deal (Lucky $even)
- Race Game
- Range Game
- Safe Crackers
- Side by Side
- Squeeze Play
- Switch?
- Switcheroo
- Temptation
- 2 for the Price of 1
- Two Price Tags (Double Prices)

== Second Larry Emdur era (2003–05) ==
The show returned on 23 June 2003 on the Nine Network, again with Emdur (earlier news reports had speculated that former A*mazing host James Sherry would be the star, but he was replaced after the previously unavailable Emdur was freed up, following the cancellation of Cash Bonanza). The series carried on the same format until 2004, when it was made a one-hour programme to combat the Seven Network's hit Deal or No Deal, in the hopes that people would stay tuned to Nine for the news after watching the first half-hour. This format was similar to the 1989 Turpie run in that it involved four pricing games; after the second and fourth games, a Showcase Showdown was played, with a $1,000 bonus for achieving a total score of $1. The two Showdown winners then competed in the Showcase Playoff, with the winner advancing to the Showcase. Starting with the expansion to a full hour, before certain prices were revealed, the contestants were tempted with a "cash buyout" of between $1,000 and $50,000. Early in the 2003 run, Suzuki cars were used for both the pricing games and the Showcase; once the Mega Showcase was introduced, Citroën cars were used for the pricing games, while Alfa Romeo cars were used for the Showcase. Holden replaced Citroen in 2005.

The Showcase at this time also added a prize of a $499,000 condominium on the Sunshine Coast in addition to eight other prizes, making the showcase worth between $500,000 and $600,000, and making it known as the "Mega Showcase". Three people won the "Mega Showcase": Marisa Tamboro (15 September 2004), Laurie Dennis (22 September 2004), and Joanne Segeviano (3 March 2005, during a special "Celebrity Week"). Another contestant did get all eight Mega Showcase prizes in correct order, but he took the cash buyout of $50,000.

Segeviano's Mega Showcase win of $664,667 (about US$612,000) was a world record for the Price franchise that stood until almost exactly three years later, in February 2008, when Adam Rose won US$1,153,908 on the U.S. primetime version of the show.

In May 2005 the show returned to a half-hour, albeit with a new format. Only two pricing games were played each day, followed by a single Showcase Showdown whose winner advanced immediately to the prize-ordering part of the Showcase. The Showcase dropped the condominium as the top prize, but a cash jackpot of over $100,000 was added to the boot of the car to entice the bidder. It was then renamed the "Monster Showcase". It was won in an episode filmed in July 2005 by Carolyn Hornsby.

On 2 July 2005 it was reported that The Price Is Right had been axed. The show ended on 24 November 2005, and Larry Emdur then signed with the Seven Network to revive the ailing Wheel of Fortune, which was cancelled after only a few months.

=== Pricing game lineup ===
The following pricing games were played during the Nine Network's second run:

- Any Number
- Bump
- Buy or Sell
- Cliff Hangers
- Clock Game
- Cover Up
- Dice Game
- Five Price Tags
- Flip Flop
- Grocery Game (range to win is $10–$10.50)
- Hole in One
- Line em Up
- Magic #
- Make Your Move
- Money Game
- One Away
- One Dollar Deal (Lucky $even)
- Race Game
- Range Game
- Safe Crackers
- Side by Side
- Squeeze Play
- Switch?
- Switcheroo
- Temptation
- 2 for the Price of 1
- Two Price Tags (Double Prices)

== Third Larry Emdur era (2012) ==
The Price Is Right was revived again in 2012 on Seven Network, hosted by Larry Emdur with announcer Brodie Young. The show used the logo and look of the 2009 French version called Le Juste Prix (The Right Price). This version premiered on 7 May 2012.

The first episode of the revamp briefly paid tribute to original host Ian Turpie, who had died of cancer earlier that month.

The Cars in Showcase is supplied by Nissan.

Speculation of an Australian revival started when Emdur, during a winter 2011 trip to Los Angeles (July), visited CBS Television City, where US version host Drew Carey had Emdur call down a contestant and host Cliff Hangers during a taping in July for an episode that aired in December 2011. Furthermore, US version announcer George Gray appeared on Rove LA, an Australian chat show also taped at CBS Television City (Studio 56) and has featured a Price prop on the show often.

In 2012, it was reported in various local newspapers in Melbourne and Sydney that the Seven Network were looking at reviving the franchise. On 28 March 2012, the Seven Network confirmed that the show would return with host Larry Emdur.

On 4 April 2012, production on the game show began at Global Television Studios in Eveleigh, Sydney with its début scheduled for 7 May at 5:00pm, leading into Deal or No Deal, which remains at 5:30pm. However, the cash and prizes featured were much lower in value than the previous versions (sponsored by Big W), which disappointed many viewers. A scandal was also alleged in this version.

On 22 October 2012, HSV7 (7 Melbourne) moved The Price Is Right to 3pm, with Melbourne travel show Coxy's Big Break taking over its 5pm timeslot. This move was made in an attempt to boost 7 News Melbourne ratings, but was unsuccessful. The move led to speculation that the show would be axed, as it wasn't mentioned in 7's 2013 programming launch, and Emdur made comments on The Morning Show about "needing a new job".

The format was similar to the short-lived United States syndicated version hosted by Doug Davidson in 1994. After all three pricing games have been played, the two contestants with the highest winnings would go through to the Showcase Play-off. Only in the event where two or all three contestants are tied in value (mainly due to them losing in their pricing game), a one-bid round would be played (although with a current item, not based on a historical item, as was the case in the 1994 US version in question).

The basic Showcase format was used, but with a few changes. At first, the range was $1,000 (e.g. between $24,000 and $25,000) for the first three weeks before decreasing to its standard $100 (e.g. between $24,500 and $24,600). The Showcase itself decreased the items down to six; the car, as always, locked in last. The winner also now had 40 seconds to make all the decisions and if time expires, any item(s) left over are automatically locked in.

Its last episode aired on 7 December 2012. On 30 January 2013, the Seven Network officially cancelled the show, and has no plans to renew it.

Since 2017, Network Ten holds exclusive rights to the show because of an agreement between network owner Paramount Global and show owner Fremantle. This agreement is part of an agreement in the United States between the two parties, as Paramount's broadcast network in the United States has broadcast the American version since 1972.

=== Pricing Game lineup ===
The 2012 series had 17 games on rotation, including:

- 3 Strikes
- Check-Out
- Cliff Hangers
- Danger Price
- Hi-Lo
- Hole in One
- It's in the Bag
- One Away
- Pick a Pair
- Plinko (free chip and a chance to earn up to two more chips. Amounts were $50, $100, $250, $0, and $1,000, for up to $3,000)
- Push Over (based on Bump)
- Safe Crackers
- Secret X
- Squeeze Play
- Take Two
- Walk the Line (based on the grocery product portion of the US "Let 'em Roll" game)
- Wonder Wall (Australia's version of the US "Punch a Bunch" game with three small prizes and six each of $50, $100, $250, and $500, three $500 slips, and one each of $1,000, $2,000, and $5,000, and two-second chances.)

== Models ==
The models of The Price Is Right often drew as much interest as the show itself. Many of the models have become celebrities in their own right. Some of these models include:

- Angelica Binos
- Anne Maree Cooksley
- Chris Frankish
- Daryl Keeley
- Elise May
- Frank Raco
- Jacqee Saunders
- Kahli Sneddon
- Kellie Johns
- Roz Roy
- Susan Thorne
- Susy Irvine
- Danielle Atkins
- Jason Fincher
- Kathy Lloyd
- Kimberley Chen
- Samantha Steele
- Sarita Stella
- Cameron Davis
- James Nicholson
- Renee Slansky
- Sarah Pope
- Jenny Hoyle

== In popular culture ==
Fictional scenes from The Price Is Right were featured in the 1997 comedy film The Castle, showing the narrator's sister appearing on the show and almost winning the showcase, but leaving with the amount of $1,234 ("If only she knew the price of the luggage!").

The Australian consumer affairs program The Checkout spoofed The Price Is Right as The Consumer Price Is Right, based on the 2003 Emdur version, in 2015.

== See also ==
- List of longest-running Australian television series
- List of Australian television series
