= Kim Watkins =

American television presenter

- Born: 22 September 1967 (age 58); Sydney, Australia
- Occupation: Television presenter
- Years active: 1979–2009
- Known for: National Nine Morning News; 1992 Olympic Games; Australia's Most Wanted; 1998 Commonwealth Games; 9am with David and Kim (2006–2009); Saving Babies (2007); Sydney New Year's Eve (2007–08), (2008–09)
- Children: three daughters

Kim Watkins (born 22 September 1967) is an Australian television and news presenter.

== Career ==
Watkins began her career in 1979, aged 12 as the co-host of the Nine Network's children's show You Asked For It.

In 1989, Kim began a six-year stint at the Seven Network in Brisbane working as a news reporter, weekend news presenter and a morning show host. While at Seven, she also worked on the 1992 Olympic Games.

In 1995, Watkins joined the Nine Network, working as a reporter on many shows including Good Medicine, Australia's Most Wanted, Money, and giving updates for the Wide World of Sports telecast of the 1998 Commonwealth Games in Kuala Lumpur. Watkins also presented National Nine Morning News and was a fill-in presenter on other National Nine News bulletins.

In April 2005, Watkins took the Nine Network to the Human Rights and Equal Opportunity Commission, following a maternity leave dispute in which Watkins was reported to be "unhappy with the work she was assigned when she returned from maternity leave after giving birth to her third child." Watkins and the Nine Network reached an agreement, and she left the Network.

In September 2005, Kim rejoined Seven Network as a reporter on Beyond Tomorrow. She stayed with the network until the end of the year.

In January 2006, Watkins joined Network Ten to co-host a new morning show 9am with David and Kim with David Reyne. The show replaced long running Good Morning Australia. She also hosted Saving Babies and was a regular fill-presenter for Carrie Bickmore on Network Ten's panel show The Project.

Kim was an avid amateur motor racing driver and has driven in a number of celebrity events, including the celebrity race before the 2006 Australian Grand Prix. Starting from second on the grid, behind three-time Australian Superbike champion Shawn Giles, Watkins finished in third place behind winner, Giles, and AFL footballer Alastair Lynch. Watkins said, "I am absolutely ecstatic with third...this is one for all the mummies out there".

Kim turned down the opportunity to audition for co-host Breakfast. The position was later given to Kathryn Robinson.

== Personal life ==
Watkins has three children, including identical mono-amniotic mono-chorionic twin girls.

Preceded by Good Morning Australia with Bert Newton	9am with David & Kim; Co-host with David Reyne; January 2006 – 11 December 2009	Succeeded by The Circle
Preceded by Gretel Killeen and Daniel MacPherson	Sydney New Year's Eve; Co-host with Andrew Günsberg; 2007–08 – 2008–09	Succeeded by Leila McKinnon and Cameron Williams
