= Possession (TV series) =

- Genre: Drama; Soap opera
- Created by: Reg Watson
- Ending theme: "There's More To Me"
- Composer: Mike Harvey
- Country of origin: Australia
- Original language: English
- No. of seasons: 1
- No. of episodes: 52

Production
- Executive producer: Don Battye
- Production company: Reg Grundy Organisation

Original release
- Network: Nine Network
- Release: 14 January 1985 – 1985

Possession is an Australian television soap opera made by the Reg Grundy Organisation for the Nine Network in 1985. It was the brainchild of the television producer, Reg Watson. The pilot was written by Bevan Lee and executive produced by Don Battye.

== Premise ==
The series began with a convoluted espionage incident that uncovered the interpersonal dramas and family secrets of several wealthy, powerful and glamorous women, their handsome young lovers, and long-lost children.

== Production ==
Originally created as a two hour telemovie it was picked up as a series after the network viewed the pilot. It premiered with the two hour show on 14 January 1985 after which it was first broadcast as one hour episodes at 7:30 on Monday and Thursday nights. It was very soon changed to Thursday and Friday nights. It was not a popular success and only ran to 52 episodes. Production was cancelled in May 1985. Director of publicity for Nine, Sue Ward said "We did a complete series. We just didn't take up the option of a second series because it didn't rate."

The later episodes played out in a late-night time slot due to low ratings. Nine asked the Australian Broadcasting Tribunal to extend the local drama quota time past 10.00 pm to allow the network to move the low-rated series out of prime time and still have the episodes count toward their local drama content. When the tribunal agreed Nine moved Possession to a graveyard slot.

== Cast ==
=== Original cast members ===
- Bruce Barry as David Macarthur, a wealthy tycoon killed off by ASIS agents in the show's premiere
- Lou Brown as Alan Morton
- Tracey Callander as Kathleen Dawson, Greg's fiancée
- Anne Charleston as Elizabeth Macarthur, David's wife
- Lyn Collingwood as Iris Dawson
- Maggie Millar as Claudia Valenti, Louise's business partner
- Lloyd Morris as Greg Macarthur, David's son
- Eric Oldfield as Gerry Foster
- Tamasin Ramsay as Jane Andrews, illegitimate daughter of David and Louise
- David Reyne as Detective Vince Bailey, investigating David's murder
- Darien Takle as Louise Carpenter, David's former mistress
- Norman Yemm as John Andrews, Jane's adopted father

=== Later additions ===
- Briony Behets as Eve Cambridge
- Max Cullen as Harry Keane, an intelligence agent
- Maggie Dence as Lady Shannon
- Ally Fowler as Nicola Shannon
- Bryan Marshall as Oliver Hearst

== Reception ==
Elizabeth Riddell of The Sydney Morning Herald said of the first episode "The script echoes the plot and production of innumerable cop series, hospital series, legal series, country town series and any big cast movie you can recall with a bit of class war thrown in." Maria McNamara of The Age writes "Initially Possession offers more action than the typical soap but it soon becomes preoccupied with relationships and general 'angst'." She added "If more Care is taken Possession has potential. It has some likable characters and enough mystery to keep it afloat."

In 2020, Fiona Byrne of the Herald Sun included Possession in her feature about "long forgotten Australian TV dramas that made viewers switch off." Summing up the show, Byrne stated: "In 1985 Channel 9 launched Possession, a soap about rich, conniving, scheming women, toy boys, love children, infidelity, plastic surgery, fights over inheritance, a secret agent and an assassination. It was promoted as a super soap, although its stars felt they were part of a high quality drama. The audience found it confusing and switched off. Highly-hyped it eventually limped to the end of its first and only season."
