= Brett Goldsmith =

Australian songwriter and music producer

- Born: Brett Hugh Goldsmith; 4 June 1961 (age 65); Melbourne, Victoria, Australia
- Occupations: Songwriter; record producer; musician; photographer
- Years active: 1980s–present
- Relatives: Olivia Newton-John (aunt); Tottie Goldsmith (sister); Emerson Newton-John (half-brother); Max Born (Great-Grandfather)

Brett Hugh Goldsmith (born 4 June 1961) is an Australian songwriter, music programmer, producer and photographer.

== Career ==
=== Music ===
In the mid 1980s Goldsmith programmed (and played bass guitar & keyboards on) the album Chantoozies for the band Chantoozies, a top ten album which was released through Mushroom Records.

Goldsmith co-wrote the singles "Wanna Be Up" & "Kiss n Tell" with fellow band member Eve von Bibra. "Wanna Be Up" peaked at no. 8 on the ARIA singles charts. He was also one of the original male members of the band.

After leaving Chantoozies, Goldsmith toured with James Reyne as his bass guitarist. They co-wrote the song Black and Blue World on Reyne's 1991 album Electric Digger Dandy. In 2013 Goldsmith released a solo album, Ordinary Life though MGM Distribution (Australia).

The title track was covered by Olivia Newton-John in 2014 on her EP Hotel Sessions, also co-written & produced by Goldsmith.

=== Photography ===
Goldsmith is also a photographer.

== Personal life ==
Goldsmith is the son of British-born actress Rona Newton-John (1941–2013) and Melbourne nightclub owner Brian Goldsmith. His grandfather was University of Melbourne professor Brinley ("Bryn") Newton-John. His great-grandfather was German-Jewish physicist and Nobel Prize winner Max Born.

Olivia Newton-John was his aunt, while singer and actress Tottie Goldsmith is his younger sister and race car driver Emerson Newton-John his younger half-brother.
