= Big Sky (Australian TV series) =

- Genre: Drama
- Starring: Gary Sweet; Ally Fowler; Rhys Muldoon; Martin Henderson
- Country of origin: Australia
- Original language: English
- No. of seasons: 2
- No. of episodes: 53

Production
- Producer: John Edwards
- Running time: 50 mins x 43 episodes
- Production company: Southern Star Xanadu

Original release
- Network: Network Ten
- Release: 17 February 1997 – 1 May 1999

Big Sky is an Australian television drama series produced by John Edwards that ran for two seasons on Network Ten from 1997 to 1999.

The show centred on the adventures of the pilots of a small aviation company in Australia called "Big Sky Aviation" and the battles of the owner to keep the company running. Chief pilot Chris Manning (Gary Sweet) is determined to look after his team, even if that conflicts with the new boss, Lauren Allen (Ally Fowler), who has inherited the company following the death of her father.

== Cast ==
=== Main / recurring ===
- Gary Sweet as Chris Manning
- Ally Fowler as Lauren Allen
- Rhys Muldoon as Jimbo James
- Martin Henderson as Scotty Gibbs
- Lisa Baumwol as Lexie Ciani (season 1)
- Robyn Cruze as Shay McWilliam
- Bille Brown as Lightfoot (season 2)
- Danielle Nuss as Paula Niessen (season 2)
- Tim Campbell as Blake Wallace (season 2)
- Peta Brady as Rosie Day (season 2)
- Sheila Kennelly as Betty (season 1)
- John Clayton as Roland 'Riley' Watson (16 episodes)
- Roxane Wilson as Robbie Manning (season 1, 13 episodes)
- Sharyn Hodgson as Jodie Turner (season 1–2, 6 episodes)

=== Guests ===
| Actor | Role | Eps |
|---|---|---|
| Anna Lise Phillips | Melanie | 1 |
| Brian Rooney | Jigger | 1 |
| Bryan Marshall | Harry | 1 |
| Christine Stephen-Daly | Simone MacIntosh | 1 |
| Christopher Mayer | Businessman #1 | 1 |
| Damian de Montemas | Spike | 1 |
| Daniel Roberts | Johnny | 2 |
| Felicity Price | Kirstie | 1 |
| Garry Who | Ivan | |
| Gennie Nevinson | Mrs Webster | 1 |
| Graham Harvey | Price | 1 |
| Harold Hopkins | Minister | 1 |
| Helen Scott | Pam McWilliam | 3 |
| Helen Thomson | Tessa Coburn | 1 |
| Ian Bliss | James McCourt | 1 |
| Inge Hornstra | Debbie | - |
| Jodie Dry | Detective Gemma Hall | 1 |
| Joel Edgerton | Pierce Bateman | 1 |
| John Noble | Graham James | 1 |
| Justin Monjo | Dave Brock | 1 |
| Kelly Dingwall | Mac McLoughlin | 1 |
| Kieran Darcy-Smith | Cooly | 2 |
| Laurie Foell | Pauline Davies | 1 |
| Leeanna Walsman | Rachel | 1 |
| Leslie Dayman | Phillip | |
| Ling-Hsueh Tang | Clarie | 1 |
| Lewis Fitz-Gerald | Tom | 1 |
| Malcolm Kennard | Larsen | 1 |
| Melissa Jaffer | Lily Bateman | 1 |
| Nina Liu | Jasmina | 1 |
| Noel Hodda | Doug Matthews | 1 |
| Noeline Brown | Patricia | 1 |
| Paul Goddard | Jeff | 1 |
| Peter Fisher | Detective Darren Taylor | 1 |
| Peter Kowitz | Warwick | 1 |
| Rachel Gordon | Tara Brown / Lisa | 1 |
| Roy Billing | Bob the Bookie / Barman | 1 |
| Russell Kiefel | Detective #1 / Roberts | 2 |
| Scott Johnson | Nick | 1 |
| Scott McGregor | Owner | 1 |
| Sheila Kennelly | Betty | 1 |
| Simon Chilvers | Rex | |
| Simon Westaway | Luke | 1 |
| Steve Le Marquand | Bill Madigan | 1 |
| Susie Porter | Tracy | 1 |
| Tara Morice | Linda | 1 |
| Tina Thomsen | Jen | 1 |
| Vanessa Downing | Danielle Morgan | 1 |
| Wendy Playfair | Mrs. Twohey | 1 |
| Wynn Roberts | Fred Morgan | 1 |

== Locations ==
- Sydney Airport

== Episodes ==
=== Season One (1997) ===
| No. overall | No. in season | Title | Directed by | Written by | Original release date |
|---|---|---|---|---|---|
| 1 | 1 | "The Principal" | Unknown | Unknown | 17 February 1997 |
| 2 | 2 | "Navstar" | Unknown | Unknown | 17 February 1997 |
| 3 | 3 | "The McCourt Family" | Unknown | Unknown | 24 February 1997 |
| 4 | 4 | "It Only Takes One" | Unknown | Unknown | 3 March 1997 |
| 5 | 5 | "Growing Pains" | Unknown | Unknown | 10 March 1997 |
| 6 | 6 | "Good Luck Baby" | Unknown | Unknown | 17 March 1997 |
| 7 | 7 | "No Turning Back" | Unknown | Unknown | 24 March 1997 |
| 8 | 8 | "Lost & Found" | Unknown | Unknown | 1 April 1997 |
| 9 | 9 | "Coming to Terms" | Unknown | Unknown | 1 April 1997 |
| 10 | 10 | "Balloon Girl" | Unknown | Unknown | 8 April 1997 |
| 11 | 11 | "Great Expectations" | Unknown | Unknown | 13 April 1997 |
| 12 | 12 | "Sweet Revenge" | Unknown | Unknown | 22 April 1997 |
| 13 | 13 | "Mortal Stakes" | Unknown | Unknown | 29 April 1997 |
| 14 | 14 | "The Sky is Calling" | Unknown | Unknown | 29 April 1997 |
| 15 | 15 | "The Duke of Yarrigul" | TBD | TBD | 1997 |
| 16 | 16 | "Simple Twist of Fate" | Unknown | Unknown | 20 May 1997 |
| 17 | 17 | "Mile Low Club" | Unknown | Unknown | 27 June 1997 |
| 18 | 18 | "Triskadelaphobia" | Unknown | Unknown | 3 June 1997 |
| 19 | 19 | "Mac's Time" | Unknown | Unknown | 10 June 1997 |
| 20 | 20 | "Boxed In" | Unknown | Unknown | 17 June 1997 |
| 21 | 21 | "Paradise" | Unknown | Unknown | 24 June 1997 |
| 22 | 22 | "It's No Secret" | Unknown | Unknown | 1 July 1997 |
| 23 | 23 | "The Return of Jimbo Jones" | Unknown | Unknown | 8 July 1997 |
| 24 | 24 | "Fly Me to the Moon" | Unknown | Unknown | 15 July 1997 |
| 25 | 25 | "Future, Past & Present" | Unknown | Unknown | 22 July 1997 |
| 26 | 26 | "The Ticking Croc" | Unknown | Unknown | 29 July 1997 |
| 27 | 27 | "Down the Slot" | Unknown | Unknown | 5 August 1997 |
| 28 | 28 | "Have a Little Faith" | Unknown | Unknown | 12 August 1997 |
| 29 | 29 | "You Must Remember This" | Unknown | Unknown | 19 August 1997 |
| 30 | 30 | "The Right Thing" | Unknown | Unknown | 26 September 1997 |
| 31 | 31 | "Fade to Black" | Unknown | Unknown | 2 September 1997 |
| 32 | 32 | "Blind Spot" | Unknown | Unknown | 9 September 1997 |
| 33 | 33 | "Getting Warmer" | Unknown | Unknown | 16 September 1997 |
| 34 | 34 | "Searching for You" | Unknown | Unknown | 23 September 1997 |
| 35 | 35 | "Wishing & Hoping" | Unknown | Unknown | 30 September 1997 |
| 36 | 36 | "The Choice" | Unknown | Unknown | 7 October 1997 |
| 37 | 37 | "Dark Horses" | Unknown | Unknown | 14 October 1997 |
| 38 | 38 | "Edge of Reality" | Unknown | Unknown | 21 October 1997 |
| 39 | 39 | "Just Between Us" | Unknown | Unknown | 4 November 1997 |
| 40 | 40 | "Phase Five" | Unknown | Unknown | 4 November 1997 |

=== Season Two (1998) ===
| No. overall | No. in season | Title | Directed by | Written by | Original release date |
|---|---|---|---|---|---|
| 1 | 41 | "Lightfoot" | Unknown | Unknown | 2 January 1999 |
| 2 | 42 | "The Price of Freedom" | Unknown | Unknown | 9 January 1999 |
| 3 | 43 | "Stand by Your Man" | Unknown | Unknown | 16 January 1999 |
| 4 | 44 | "The Things We Do for Love" | Unknown | Unknown | 23 January 1999 |
| 5 | 45 | "A Family Affair" | Unknown | Unknown | 30 January 1999 |
| 6 | 46 | "The Wrong Box" | Unknown | Unknown | 6 February 1999 |
| 7 | 47 | "Friends in High Places" | Unknown | Unknown | 13 February 1999 |
| 8 | 48 | "Shadow Chasers" | Unknown | Unknown | 20 February 1999 |
| 9 | 49 | "The Heart of the Matter" | Unknown | Unknown | 27 February 1999 |
| 10 | 50 | "Secrets and Lies" | Unknown | Unknown | 6 March 1999 |
| 11 | 51 | "Desperate Measures" | Unknown | Unknown | 20 March 1999 |
| 12 | 52 | "Missing in Action" | Unknown | Unknown | 24 April 1999 |
| 13 | 53 | "Ultimate Commitments" | Tony Tilse | Alexa Wyatt | 1 May 1999 |

== Home media ==
It was announced by Via Vision Entertainment in March 2019 that they would be releasing the complete collection of Big Sky on DVD in three Collections.

| Title | Format | Ep # | Discs | Region 4 (Australia) | Special features | Distributors |
|---|---|---|---|---|---|---|
| Big Sky Collection 01 | DVD | 16 | 4 | 22 May 2019 | None | Via Vision Entertainment |
| Big Sky Collection 02 | DVD | 17 | 5 | 7 August 2019 | None | Via Vision Entertainment |
| Big Sky Collection 03 | DVD | 20 | 5 | 9 October 2019 | None | Via Vision Entertainment |
| Big Sky Complete Collection | DVD | 53 | 14 | 7 October 2020 | None | Via Vision Entertainment |

== See also ==
- List of Australian television series
