= Wanna Be Up =

- 7" single cover

Single by Chantoozies

from the album Chantoozies
- B-side: "Little Woman"
- Released: 2 May 1988
- Studio: Platinum Studios, Melbourne
- Genre: Synth pop, electronic
- Length: 3:39
- Label: Mushroom
- Songwriters: Eve von Bibra; Brett Goldsmith
- Producers: Stewart Day; Mark S. Berry

Chantoozies singles chronology
"He's Gonna Step On You Again" (1987)	"Wanna Be Up" (1988)	"Kiss 'n' Tell" (1988)

Music video
- "Wanna Be Up" on YouTube

"Wanna Be Up" is a song written by Eve von Bibra and Brett Goldsmith and recorded by Australia group Chantoozies. The song was released in May 1988 as the third single from their self-titled debut album (1988). The song peaked at number 6 in Australia, becoming the group's second top ten single.

== Track listings ==
7" single (K 492)

- Side A "Wanna Be Up" - 3:39
- Side B "Little Woman" - 4:06

12" single (X 14596)

- Side A "Wanna Be Up" (12" version) - 5:20
- Side B1 "Wanna Be Up" (7" version) - 3:39
- Side B2 "Little Woman" - 4:06

== Charts ==
=== Weekly charts ===
Chart (1988)	Peak position
Australia (ARIA)	6

=== Year-end charts ===
Chart (1988)	Peak position
Australia (ARIA Charts)	23
Australian Artist (ARIA Charts)	5
