= 9am with David & Kim =

2006–2009 Australian TV series

- Also known as: 9am
- Genre: Morning Show
- Presented by: Kim Watkins; David Reyne
- Country of origin: Australia
- Original language: English
- No. of seasons: 4
- No. of episodes: 938

Production
- Production locations: Melbourne, Victoria
- Running time: 120 minutes per episode (inc. commercials)

Original release
- Network: Network Ten
- Release: 30 January 2006 – 11 December 2009

9am with David & Kim is an Australian morning show which premiered on Monday 30 January 2006 on Network Ten. It aired live from 9 am - 11 am weekdays, and was hosted by musician and former Getaway reporter David Reyne and former National Nine News presenter and journalist Kim Watkins. Fill in presenters have included Ann-Maree Biggar, Christi Malthouse, Corinne Grant, Kathryn Robinson, Stephen Quartermain and music mogul Ian Dickson.

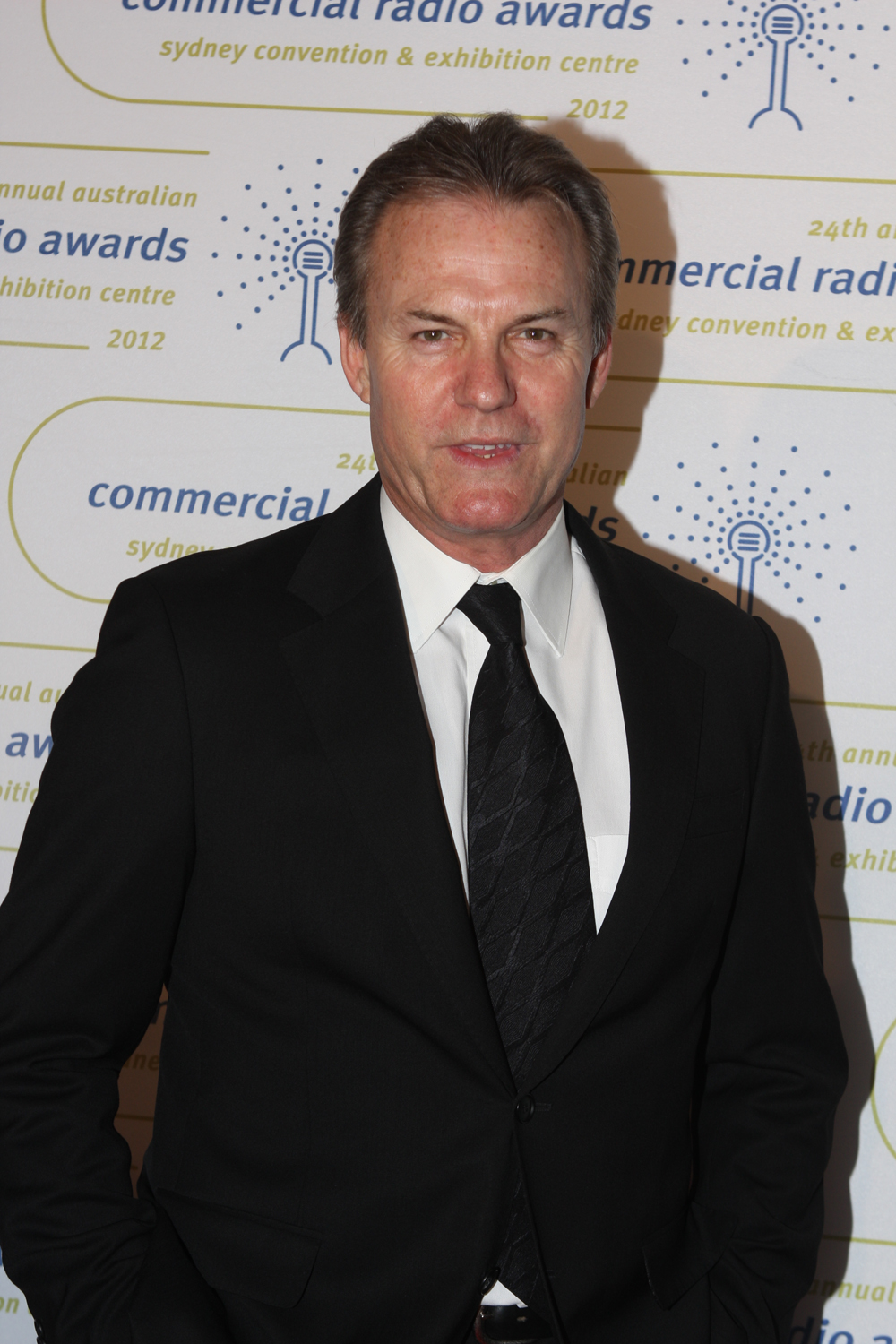
Presenter David Reyne, who was a presenter of the program with Kim Watkins

The program replaced long time morning program Good Morning Australia with Bert Newton, which finished in late 2005, after Bert Newton returned to the Nine Network. Sandy Paterson was the executive producer of the program. Throughout its run the show had struggled behind competing programs The Morning Show and Mornings with Kerri-Anne, averaging around 50,000 viewers an episode.

== Demise ==
In August 2009, Reyne announced that he will be leaving 9am at the end of the year, after 4 years with the show and Ten. On 7 December 2009 Watkins also confirmed she had also quit the show, with Ten programmer David Mott announcing a brand new concept for the timeslot next year. It is unclear whether Watkins has left the network altogether. The final ever show aired on Friday 11 December 2009 due to a strong competition with Seven's The Morning Show. 9am Summertime concluded on 5 February 2010. The following week after the demise the 9am website was removed.

On 16 January 2010, it was announced The Circle would be the replacement show, which started on 9 February 10 am-12 pm following the new time slot for the Ten Morning News hour 9 am-10 am.

== Segments ==
9am included a mix of lifestyle, cooking and interview segments along with advertorials. The advertorials were for products from home-shopping companies such as Danoz Direct and Global Shop Direct, and were mostly presented by Marianne van Dorslar & Ann-Maree Biggar.

Regular segments and their hosts included:

1. Family Matters: John Irvine
2. Your Garden: David Kirkpatrick
3. Fashion, style, beauty and home: Dhav Naidu
4. Health and Fitness: Christi Malthouse and Craig Harper
5. Entertainment: Benjamin Hart
6. Your Pets: Julie Summerfield
7. Your Health: David Spencer
8. Music: Ian Dickson
9. Cooking: Chef Arianne Spratt
10. Your Place: Ann-Maree Biggar
11. Lifestyle Travel: Shannon Watts

At the start of the program Kim Watkins read the news headlines, and at 10.15 am Ten News presenter Natarsha Belling presents a news update. At the end of each show, Reyne used his trademark sign-off - using a different adjective in place of "nice" as in "Have a nice day" (for example, "Have a colossal day").

== Celebrity fill-ins ==
- Martin Short (Monday 25 May 2009)
- Nia Vardalos (Friday 10 July 2009)
- Frank Woodley (Friday 23 October 2009)

== 9am Summertime ==
Over summer Ann-Maree Biggar presented a pre-recorded show of highlights throughout the year.

Although the program was pre-recorded the advertorials shown were live.

== See also ==
- The Circle
- List of programs broadcast by Network Ten
- List of Australian television series

== Notes ==
1. This includes 30 "Summertime" episodes which ran from 18 December 2006 to 26 January 2007.
