= Eve von Bibra =

Australian singer-songwriter and actress (born 1966)

- Born: Eve Sarah von Bibra; 27 June 1966 (age 60); Melbourne, Victoria, Australia
- Genre: Pop
- Occupations: Singer-songwriter, actress
- Years active: 1984–present
- Member of: Chantoozies

Eve Sarah von Bibra (born 27 June 1966) is an Australian singer-songwriter and actress. From 1986 to 1991, she was a member of the pop group, Chantoozies, as one of four female lead vocalists. She co-wrote their hit, "Wanna Be Up", which peaked in the top 10 on the ARIA Singles Chart in July 1988. Von Bibra acted in the 2006 movie Kenny, playing Jackie – a flight attendant and the title character's love interest. She studied at Royal Academy of Dramatic Art and is a member of the Australian branch of the Bibra family.

== Biography ==
Von Bibra was born on 27 June 1966 and grew up in Melbourne. She relocated to London to enrol in the Royal Academy of Dramatic Art. Upon return to Australia, at the age of 18, she joined the Victorian State Opera as a soprano in Gilbert and Sullivan productions and in a Bach Operetta. She acted in a 1980s television soap opera, Sons and Daughters. In 1986 she formed a pop group, Chantoozies, with Ally Fowler on vocals, Tottie Goldsmith on vocals, Angie LaBozzetta on vocals, Scott Griffiths on keyboards, Frank McCoy on guitar and vocals, Brett Goldsmith (Tottie's brother) on bass guitar and guitar, and David Reyne on drums (ex-Australian Crawl, Cats Under Pressure). They released two albums, Chantoozies (1987) and Gild the Lily (1991) before disbanding in 1991. In July 1988 their third single, "Wanna Be Up", which was co-written by Von Bibra and Brett, peaked at No. 6 on the ARIA Singles Chart. The band's fourth single, another Brett and Von Bibra song, "Kiss'n' Tell", was released in August 1988 and peaked at No. 25 in October. One of the group's last singles was a cover version of Stephen Stills' track, "Love the One You're With". After Chantoozies disbanded in late 1991 von Bibra returned to acting with roles on mid-1990s TV including Time Trax (1993) and The Damnation of Harvey McHugh (1994). Aside from acting, von Bibra has also worked on TV shows as an artist co-ordinator for RocKwiz (2007–2012) and assisting production for Angry Boys (2011) and Outland (2012). In November 2008 on RocKwiz, von Bibra appeared as a guest contestant and performed her solo rendition of "Love the One You're With" and a duet with Jed Kurzel (The Mess Hall) for a cover of Bee Gees hit, "To Love Somebody".

=== Kenny and its spin-off ===
Von Bibra acted in the 2006 feature film, Kenny, playing Jackie Sheppard – a flight attendant – the title character's love interest. She appeared in five of nine episodes of the spin-off TV mockumentary series, Kenny – a World Tour of Toilets, in 2008.

== Filmography ==
Film
Year	Film	Role	Notes
1990	The Big Steal	Pam's friend	
1990	Father	Roxy	
2006	Kenny	Jackie Sheppard	Love interest of title character
Television
Year	Title	Role	Notes
1982–1987	Sons and Daughters	Dolly Bird	
1987	Nancy Wake (miniseries)	Claire	
1993	Time Trax	Waitress	"The Prodigy" episode
1994	The Damnation of Harvey McHugh	Morgana	"Little House on the Gold Coast" episode
2007–2012	RocKwiz	Self	Rockstar wrangler, artist co-ordinator: In November 2008, Series 6, Episode 80, guest contestant and performer
2008	Kenny – a World Tour of Toilets	Jackie Sheppard	Continuation of role in related movie, Kenny
2010–2011	The Accident	Mum	
2011	Angry Boys	Self	Assistant to producer
2012	Outland	Self	Executive producer assistant
